= Ballando con le Stelle series 12 =

Ballando con le Stelle
- Season 12
- Celebrity winner: Oney Tapia
- Professional winner: Veera Kinnunen

Release
- Original network: RAI 1
- Original release: 25 February – 29 April 2017

Series chronology
- ← Previous; Series 11 Next → Series 13

The twelfth series of Ballando con le Stelle was broadcast from 25 February 2017 to 29 April 2017 on RAI 1 and was presented by Milly Carlucci with Paolo Belli and his Big Band.

== Couples ==
Celebrity	Age	Occupation	Professional partner	Status
Anna La Rosa	61	Political journalist & television presenter	Stefano Oradei	Eliminated 1st on 4 March 2017
Anna Galiena	62	Stage & screen actress	Simone Di Pasquale	Eliminated 2nd on 11 March 2017
Fausto Leali	72	Singer-songwriter	Ornella Boccafoschi	Eliminated 3rd on 18 March 2017
Christopher Leoni	30	Model & actor	Ekaterina Vaganova	Eliminated 4th on 15 March 2017
Martín Castrogiovanni	35	Former Rugby player	Sara Di Vaira	Eliminated 8th on 8 April 2017
Giuliana De Sio	59	Stage & screen actress	Maykel Fonts	Eliminated 7th on 8 April 2017; Voted back on 15 April 2017; Eliminated 10th on 22 April 2017
Alba Parietti	55	Showgirl & television presenter	Marcello Nuzio	Eliminated 11th on 22 April 2017
Antonio Palmese	33	Stage & screen actor	Samanta Togni	Eliminated 9th on 8 April 2017; Voted back on 15 April 2017; Fourth place on 29 April 2017
Simone Montedoro	43	Stage & screen actor	Alessandra Tripoli	Eliminated 6th on 8 April 2017; Voted back on 15 April 2017; Fourth place on 29 April 2017
Xenya	30	Fashion model	Raimondo Todaro	Third place on 29 April 2017
Martina Stella	32	Film & television actress	Samuel Peron	Eliminated 5th on 1 April 2017; Voted back on 8 April 2017; Third place on 29 April 2017
Fabio Basile	23	Olympic judoka	Anastasia Kuzmina	Second place on 29 April 2017
Oney Tapia	40	Paralympic athlete	Veera Kinnunen	Winners on 29 April 2017

== Scoring chart ==
Couple	Place	1	2	3	4	5	6	7	8	9	10
Oney & Veera	1	38	47	50	52 + 50 = 102	47	49 + 50 = 99	46	-	50 + 50 = 100	50
Fabio & Anastasia	2	39	39 + 20= 59	43	33	52	44	47		46 + 100 = 146	44
Martina & Samuel	3	36	41 + 48 = 89	45	43	30	36	37%	-	44 + 50 = 94	66
Xenya & Raimondo	3	32	40	26 + 36 = 62	49	42	38 + 30 = 68	45 + 49 = 94	-	35	57
Simone & Alessandra	4	33	34 + 40 = 74	33	39	30	34	33	79	34 + 50 = 84	37
Antonio & Samanta	4	21	24	37	25	28	43 + 20 = 63	34	78	41 + 48 = 89	53
Alba & Marcello	7	29	33	36	17	22	33	39	-	28 + 50 = 78	
Giuliana & Maykel	8	12	25	32	20	22 + 50 = 72	27	21	78	26	
Martín & Sara	9	22 + 35 = 57	34	34	44	29	28 + 10 + 47 = 95	29	78		
Christopher & Ekaterina	10	22	25	26	37	36			18		
Fausto & Ornella	11	20	22	18	36				20		
Anna & Simone	12	16	21	21					21		
Anna & Stefano	13	15	16						29		

Red numbers indicate the lowest score for each week.
Green numbers indicate the highest score for each week.
indicates the couple eliminated that week.
indicates the returning couples that finished in the bottom two/three was saved by a second public vote.
indicates the returning couples that finished in the top position and received a bonus for the next week.
indicates the returning couples that finished in the bottom position and received a malus for the next week.
indicates the returning couple that received a bonus.
indicates the couple who quit the competition.
indicates the couple who was ejected from the competition.
indicates the couple was voted back into the competition.
indicates the couple was voted back into the competition but then re-eliminated.
indicates the winning couple.
indicates the runner-up couple.
indicates the third-place couple.
