= Ballando con le Stelle series 14 =

Ballando con le Stelle
- Season 14
- Celebrity winner: Lasse Matberg
- Professional winner: Sara Di Vaira

Release
- Original network: RAI 1
- Original release: 30 March – 31 May 2019

Series chronology
- ← Previous; Series 13 Next → Series 15

The fourteenth series of Ballando con le Stelle was broadcast from 30 March 2019 to 31 May 2019 on RAI 1 and was presented by Milly Carlucci with Paolo Belli and his Big Band.

== Couples ==
Celebrity	Age	Occupation	Professional partner	Status
Kevin and Jonathan Sampaio	32	Twin models	Lucrezia Lando	Eliminated 1st on 6 April 2019
Marco Leonardi	17	YouTube personality	Mia Gabusi	Eliminated 2nd on 13 April 2019
Antonio Razzi	71	Former Forza Italia politician & senator	Ornella Boccafoschi	Eliminated 3rd on 20 April 2019
Marzia Roncacci	56	Journalist & TG2 newsreader	Samuel Peron	Eliminated 4th on 27 April 2019; Voted back on 4 May 2019; Eliminated 7th on 11 May 2019
Manuela Arcuri	42	Film & television actress	Luca Favilla	Eliminated 5th on 4 May 2019
Sister Cristina	30	Nun & singer	Stefano Oradei, Jessica De Bona and Giulia Antonelli	Eliminated 8th on 24 May 2019
Enrico Lo Verso	55	Stage & screen actor	Samanta Togni	Eliminated 6th on 4 May 2019; Voted back on 11 May 2019; Eliminated 9th on 25 May 2019
Angelo Russo	57	Il commissario Montalbano actor & comedian	Anastasia Kuzmina	Fourth place on 31 May 2019
Nunzia De Girolamo	43	Former Forza Italia politician & journalist	Raimondo Todaro	Fourth place on 31 May 2019
Dani Osvaldo	33	Former footballer	Veera Kinnunen	Third place on 31 May 2019
Milena Vukotic	83	Film & television actress	Simone Di Pasquale	Third place on 31 May 2019
Ettore Bassi	48	FIlm & television actor	Alessandra Tripoli	Second place on 31 May 2019
Lasse Matberg	33	Social media personality	Sara Di Vaira	Winners on 31 May 2019

== Scoring chart ==
Couple	Place	1	2	3	4	5	6	7	8	9	10
Lasse & Sara	1	24	30 - 10 = 20	41	39	34 + 8 = 42	43 + 15 = 58	47 + 20 + 15 = 82	70	37 + 15 + 10 = 62	50
Ettore & Alessandra	2	33	48	47	50 + 10 = 60	47 + 4 + 15 = 66	40 + 10 + 10 = 60	47	60	49 + 10 + 20 = 79	49
Milena & Simone	3	38	44 + 10 = 54	48 + 10 = 58	46	31 + 9 + 20 = 60	47 + 50 = 97	47 + 25 = 72	90	46 + 9 + 25 = 78	46
Dani & Veera	3	42	45	47	48	48 + 8 = 56	48	47 + 15 + 10 = 71	25	38 + 10 = 48	49
Nunzia & Raimondo	4	32	14	27	34	31 + 3 - 1 + 49 = 82	34	33 + 10 + 20 = 63	50	31 + 8 + 10 = 49	37
Angelo & Anastasia	4	20	39	30	35	47 + 5 + 10 = 62	40 + 20 + 20 = 80	42 + 25 = 67	50	35 + 10 + 25 = 70	38
Enrico & Samanta	7	19	23 - 10 + 24 = 37	15	26	39 + 8 = 47	45 + 15 = 60	89%	0	31 + 9 = 40	
Sister Cristina & Stefano Oradei Team	8	43	46	37	28	32 + 7 = 39	43	42	0		
Manuela & Luca	9	34	31	32 + 50 = 82	22 + 25 = 47	27 + 3 = 30	28	21%			
Marzia & Samuel	10	26	9	31	21	21 + 6 = 27	6	47%			
Antonio & Ornella	11	9	14 + 23 = 37	20 + 43 = 63	10 + 25 = 35			39%			
Marco & Mia	12	12 + 10 + 50 = 72	15 + 10 = 25	27				43%			
Kevin, Jonathan & Lucrezia	13	20	24					11%			

Red numbers indicate the lowest score for each week.
Green numbers indicate the highest score for each week.
indicates the couple eliminated that week.
indicates the returning couples that finished in the bottom two/three was saved by a second public vote.
indicates the returning couples that finished in the top position and received a bonus for the next week.
indicates the returning couples that finished in the bottom position and received a malus for the next week.
indicates the returning couple that received a bonus.
indicates the couple who quit the competition.
indicates the couple who was ejected from the competition.
indicates the couple was voted back into the competition.
indicates the couple was voted back into the competition but then re-eliminated.
indicates the winning couple.
indicates the runner-up couple.
indicates the third-place couple.
