= Ballando con le Stelle series 13 =

Ballando con le Stelle
- Season 13
- Celebrity winner: Cesare Bocci
- Professional winner: Alessandra Tripoli

Release
- Original network: RAI 1
- Original release: 10 March – 19 May 2018

Series chronology
- ← Previous; Series 12 Next → Series 14

The thirteenth series of Ballando con le Stelle was broadcast from 10 March 2018 to 19 March 2018 on RAI 1 and was presented by Milly Carlucci with Paolo Belli and his Big Band.

== Couples ==
| Celebrity | Age | Occupation | Professional partner | Status |
|---|---|---|---|---|
| Don Diamont | 55 | The Bold and the Beautiful actor | Hanna Karttunen | Eliminated 1st on 17 March 2018 |
| Stefania Rocca | 46 | Stage & screen actress | Marcello Nuzio | Eliminated 2nd on 24 March 2018 |
| Eleonora Giorgi | 64 | Stage & screen actress | Samuel Peron | Eliminated 3rd on 31 March 2018 |
| Cristina Ich | 31 | Model & social media personality | Luca Favilla | Eliminated 4th on 7 April 2018 |
| Amedeo Minghi | 70 | Singer-songwriter | Samanta Togni | Eliminated 5th on 14 April 2018 |
| Massimiliano Morra | 31 | Film & television actor | Sara Di Vaira | Eliminated 6th on 21 April 2018; Voted back on 28 April 2018; Eliminated 7th on 5 May 2018 |
| Akash Kumar | 26 | Model | Veera Kinnunen | Eliminated 8th on 5 May 2018 |
| Giovanni Ciacci | 46 | Stylist & television personality | Raimondo Todaro | Fourth place on 19 May 2018 |
| Nathalie Guetta | 59 | Don Matteo actress & sister of David Guetta | Simone Di Pasquale | Fourth place on 19 May 2018 |
| Giaro Giarratana | 25 | Model & social media personality | Lucrezia Lando | Third place on 19 May 2018 |
| Gessica Notaro | 28 | Television & media personality | Stefano Oradei | Third place on 19 May 2018 |
| Francisco Porcella | 31 | Surfer | Anastasia Kuzmina | Second place on 19 May 2018 |
| Cesare Bocci | 60 | Film & television actor | Alessandra Tripoli | Winners on 19 May 2018 |

== Scoring chart ==
| Couple | Place | 1 | 2 | 3 | 4 | 5 | 6 | 7 | 8 | 9 | 10 |
|---|---|---|---|---|---|---|---|---|---|---|---|
| Cesare & Alessandra | 1 | 41 | 43 | 41 | 27 | 33 | 40 | 40 + 30 + 50 = 120 | 39 | 32 | 58 |
| Francisco & Anastasia | 2 | 39 | 46 | 46 | 48 + 5 = 53 | 39 | 35 | 43 + 30 = 73 | 43 + 50 = 93 | 46 | 59 |
| Gessica & Stefano | 3 | 42 | 47 | 48 | 45 + 48 = 93 | 50 + 5 = 55 | 47 | 49 | 37 | 46 + 15 = 63 | 58 |
| Giaro & Lucrezia | 3 | 32 | 44 + 5 = 49 | 38 | 39 | 41 | 34 + 20 = 54 | 44 + 30 = 74 | 43 | 39 + 10 = 49 | 59 |
| Nathalie & Simone | 4 | 24 | 21 + 50 = 71 | 19 | 39 | 38 +5 = 43 | 30 + 50 = 80 | 11 | 16 | 5 + 50 = 55 | 38 |
| Giovanni & Raimondo | 4 | 32 | 28 | 28 | 33 | 35 + 5 = 40 | 33 + 5 = 38 | 48 + 30 + 10 = 88 | 38 + 10 = 48 | 43 + 10 = 53 | 51 |
| Akash & Veera | 7 | 24 | 30 | 42 | 29 | 35 | 39 | 36 | 26 | 28 | |
| Massimiliano & Sara | 8 | 34 | 34 | 0 + 5 = 5 | 18 | 22 + 48 = 70 | 24 | 41 | 63% | 9 | |
| Amedeo & Samanta | 9 | 25 | 22 | 23 | 29 | 33 + 15 = 48 | 33 + 5 = 38 | - | 21% | | |
| Cristina & Luca | 10 | 36 | 35 | 20 | 35 | 25 | | 7% | 30% | | |
| Eleonora & Samuel | 11 | 18 | 18 - 10 = 8 | 25 + 50 = 75 | 25 | | | - | 16% | | |
| Stefania & Marcello | 12 | 20 + 40 = 60 | 35 | 26 | | | | - | 37% | | |
| Don & Hanna | 13 | 30 | 29 | | | | | - | 32% | | |

Red numbers indicate the lowest score for each week.
Green numbers indicate the highest score for each week.
indicates the couple eliminated that week.
indicates the returning couples that finished in the bottom two/three was saved by a second public vote.
indicates the returning couples that finished in the top position and received a bonus for the next week.
indicates the returning couples that finished in the bottom position and received a malus for the next week.
indicates the returning couple that received a bonus.
indicates the couple who quit the competition.
indicates the couple who was ejected from the competition.
indicates the couple was voted back into the competition.
indicates the couple was voted back into the competition but then re-eliminated.
indicates the winning couple.
indicates the runner-up couple.
indicates the third-place couple.
