= Ballando con le Stelle series 15 =

Ballando con le Stelle
- Season 15
- Celebrity winner: Gilles Rocca
- Professional winner: Lucrezia Lando

Release
- Original network: RAI 1
- Original release: 19 September 2020

Series chronology
- ← Previous; Series 14 Next → Series 16

The fifteenth series of Ballando con le Stelle was broadcast from 19 September 2020 to 21 November 2020 on RAI 1 and was presented by Milly Carlucci with Paolo Belli and his Big Band.

== Couples ==
Celebrity	Age	Occupation	Professional partner	Status
Barbara Bouchet	77	Film & television actress	Stefano Oradei	Eliminated 1st on 26 September 2020
Ninetto Davoli	71	FIlm & television actor	Ornella Boccafoschi	Eliminated 2nd on 3 October 2020
Antonio Catalani	32	Painter & model	Tove Villför	Eliminated 3rd on 10 October 2020
Lina Sastri	65	Film & television actress	Simone Di Pasquale	Eliminated 4th on 17 October 2020
Rosalinda Celentano	52	Actress & daughter of Adriano Celentano	Tinna Hoffman	Eliminated 5th on 24 October 2020
Vittoria Schisano	36	Actress & model	Marco De Angelis	Eliminated 7th on 14 November 2020
Tullio Solenghi	72	Comedian & actor	Maria Ermachkova	Seventh Place on 21 November 2020
Costantino della Gherardesca	43	Television presenter	Sara Di Vaira	Fourth Place on 21 November 2020
Daniele Scardina	28	Professional boxer	Anastasia Kuzmina	Fourth Place on 21 November 2020
Elisa Isoardi	36	Television presenter	Raimondo Todaro	Fourth Place on 21 November 2020
Alessandra Mussolini	56	Former politician & television personality	Maykel Fonts	Third Place on 21 November 2020
Paolo Conticini	51	Film & television actor	Veera Kinnunen	Second Place on 21 November 2020
Gilles Rocca	37	Model, actor & producer	Lucrezia Lando	Winners on 21 November 2020
