= Ballando con le Stelle series 21 =

Ballando con le Stelle
- Season 21
- No. of episodes: 12

Release
- Original network: Rai 1
- Original release: 3 October – 19 December 2026

Series chronology
- ← Previous; Series 20

The twenty-first series of Ballando con le Stelle is currently broadcasting from 3 October 2026 to 19 December 2026 on Rai 1 and is presented by Milly Carlucci with Simone Di Pasquale and the Big Band.

This edition sees the number of competing couples return to thirteen, with a consequent reduction in the number of episodes to twelve.

The dancer Simone Di Pasquale, who had held the role of tribune and master, is replacing Massimiliano Rosolino as co-host for this season.

Choreographer Matteo Addino and former master of the program Sara Di Vaira are reconfirmed as tribune. As in the previous four editions, both have the possibility of drawing a pair eliminated each thanks to the mechanism called "wild card".

The program airs from 9.30 pm, after Affari Tuoi.

As with the previous four editions, the program is accompanied by its spin-off Ballando Segreto, broadcast in streaming on RaiPlay from 2 October 2026 and focused on unpublished and "behind the scenes" content of the edition.

== Couples and jury ==
Celebrity	Age	Occupation	Professional partner	Status
Massimo Ghini	71	Actor	Valentina Fiorini	Eliminated 1st 24 October 2026
Eugenio Finardi	74	Singer & songwriter	Rebecca Gabrielli	Eliminated 2nd 31 October 2026
Jimmy Ghione	62	TV personality & former actor	Anastasia Kuzmina	Eliminated 3rd 14 November 2026
Riccardo Rossi	63	Actor & comedian	Elisa Terrasi	Eliminated 4th 21 November 2026
Alberto Ravagnani	33	Former priest & influencer	Erica Martinelli	
Alessandro Matri	42	Former footballer	Giada Lini	
Andy Díaz	30	Olympic triple jumper	Gioia Giovanatti	
Anna Safroncik	45	Actress	Leonardo Lini	
Aurora Ramazzotti	29	Television presenter	Nikita Perotti	
Manuela Moreno	60	Journalist & anchorwoman	Carlo Aloia	
Monica Guerritore	68	Actress	Luca Urso	
Noemi Bocchi	38	Partner of Francesco Totti	Giovanni Pernice	
Ornella Muti	71	Actress	Pasquale La Rocca	

=== Jury ===
- Ivan Zazzaroni
- Alberto Matano
- Carolyn Smith (Jury's president)
- Barbara D'Urso
- Guillermo Mariotto

=== Opinionist ===
- Simona Ventura
- Francesca Fialdini

=== Popular tribunes ===
- Rossella Erra
- Matteo Addino
- Sara di Vaira

== Scoring chart ==
Couple	Place	1	2	3	4	5	6	7	8	9	10	11	12
Alberto & Erica		32	33	42+30=72	40	41	38	45	38				
Alessandro & Giada		36	36+20=56	38	43+30=73	46+20=66	46	46+30=76	49				
Andy & Gioia		43	44	44+30=74	44	40+20=60	36	45	47				
Anna & Leonardo		42	45	22	37	33	47	46	47+20=67				
Aurora & Nikita		43	32+20=52	46	36	42	44	40+30=70	50+20=70				
Manuela & Carlo		36	31	44	41	34	40+20=60	32	35				
Monica & Luca		41+16=57	45+20=65	42+20=62	48	36+20=56	48	50+30=80	48+20=68				
Noemi & Giovanni		42+16=58	38	42	49	47+20=67	45+20=65	47+20=67	48				
Ornella & Pasquale		40	41+20=61	48+30=78	46+20+30=76	46	30	45	44+20=64				
Riccardo & Elisa	10	12	21	22	34	36	37+20=57	32	39				
Jimmy & Anastasia	11	16	21	25	26	34	34+20=54	33-20=13					
Eugenio & Rebecca	12	21+16=37	27	28	34+30=64	18							
Massimo & Valentina	13	16	14	19	18								

Red numbers indicate the lowest score for each week.
Green numbers indicate the highest score for each week.
indicates the couple eliminated that week.
indicates the returning couples that finished in the bottom two/three was saved by a second public vote.
indicates the returning couples that finished in the top position and received a bonus for the next week.
indicates the returning couples that finished in the bottom position and received a malus for the next week.
indicates the returning couple that received a bonus.
indicates the couple who quit the competition.
indicates the couple who does not compete in the episode.
indicates the couple who was ejected from the competition.
indicates the couple was voted back into the competition.
indicates the couple was eliminated but was voted back into the competition by "wild card".
indicates the couple was voted back into the competition but then re-eliminated.
indicates the winning couple.
indicates the runner-up couple.
indicates the third-place couple.
