= Ballando con le Stelle series 16 =

Ballando con le Stelle
- Season 16
- Celebrity winner: Arisa
- Professional winner: Vito Coppola

Release
- Original network: RAI 1
- Original release: 16 October 2021

Series chronology
- ← Previous; Series 15 Next → Series 17

The sixteenth series of Ballando con le Stelle was broadcast from 16 October 2021 to 18 December 2021 on RAI 1 and was presented by Milly Carlucci with Paolo Belli and his Big Band.

== Couples ==
Celebrity	Age	Occupation	Professional partner	Status
Valerio Rossi Albertini	57	Physicist & science communicator	Sara Di Vaira	Eliminated 1st on 23 October 2021
Al Bano	78	Singer-songwriter	Oxana Lebedew	Withdrew on 30 October 2021
Fabio Galante	46	Former footballer & sport manager	Giada Lini	Eliminated 2nd on 6 November 2021
Mietta	51	Singer-songwriter	Maykel Fonts	Eliminated 3rd on 13 November 2021
Memo Remigi	83	Singer & television personality	Maria Ermachkova	Eliminated 4th on 27 November 2021
Andrea Iannone	32	Former Moto GP racer	Lucrezia Lando	Eliminated 5th on 4 December 2021
Alvise Rigo	28	Former rugby player & model	Tove Villför	Eliminated 6th on 11 December 2021
Federico Lauri	32	Hairstylist & Il Salone Delle Meraviglie star	Anastasia Kuzmina	Fifth place on 18 December 2021
Valeria Fabrizi	84	Film & television actress	Giordano Filippo	Fifth place on 18 December 2021
Morgan	47	Former Bluvertigo singer & musician	Alessandra Tripoli	Third place on 18 December 2021
Sabrina Salerno	53	Singer & showgirl	Samuel Peron	Third place on 18 December 2021
Bianca Gascoigne	34	Daughter of Paul Gascoigne, influencer & model	Simone Di Pasquale	Second place on 18 December 2021
Arisa	39	Singer-songwriter	Vito Coppola	Winners on 18 December 2021

== Scoring Chart ==
Couples	1	2	3	4	5	6	7	8	9	10
Arisa & Vito	85	54	40	42	47		73			67
Bianca & S										
S&S										
M&										
V&										
F&										
A&										
A&										
MM&										
MM&										
FG&										
AO&										
VS&										
