= Ballando con le Stelle series 11 =

Ballando con le Stelle
- Season 11
- Celebrity winner: Iago García
- Professional winner: Samanta Togni

Release
- Original network: RAI 1
- Original release: 20 February – 23 April 2016

Series chronology
- ← Previous; Series 10 Next → Series 12

The eleventh series of Ballando con le Stelle was broadcast from 20 February 2016 to 23 April 2016 on RAI 1 and was presented by Milly Carlucci with Paolo Belli and his Big Band.

== Couples ==
Celebrity	Age	Occupation	Professional partner	Status
Lando Buzzanca	80	Actor	Sara Mardegan	Eliminated 1st on 27 February 2016
Pierre Cosso	54	Actor	Maria Ermachkova	Eliminated 2nd on 5 March 2016
Enrico Papi	50	Television presenter	Ornella Boccafoschi	Eliminated 3rd on 12 March 2016
Salvo Sottile	43	Journalist and anchorman	Alessandra Tripoli	Eliminated 4th on 19 March 2016
Margareth Madè	33	Actress	Samuel Peron	Eliminated 5th on 26 March 2016; Voted back on 2 April 2016; Eliminated 8th on 9 April 2016
Asia Argento	40	Actress, daughter of Dario Argento	Maykel Fonts	Eliminated 6th on 2 April 2016
Platinette	60	Drag queen, television personality	Raimondo Todaro	Eliminated 9th on 16 April 2016
Daniel Nilsson	36	Model	Valeriia Belozerova	Fifth place on 23 April 2016
Nicole Orlando	22	Paralympic athlete	Stefano Oradei	Fifth place on 23 April 2016
Luca Sguazzini	27	Model and travel vlogger	Veera Kinnunen	Third place on 23 April 2016
Rita Pavone	70	Singer	Simone Di Pasquale	Third place on 23 April 2016
Michele Morrone	25	Actor	Ekaterina Vaganova	Eliminated 7th on 2 April 2016; Voted back on 9 April 2016; Second place on 23 April 2016
Iago García	36	Soap opera actor	Samanta Togni	Winners on 23 April 2016

== Scoring chart ==
Couple	Place	1	2	3	4	5	6	7	8	9	10
Iago & Samanta	1	27	25 + 30 = 55	26	34 + 20 = 54		28 + 20 = 48	30	20	48 + 20 = 68	50 + 10 = 60
Michele & Ekaterina	2	28	31	39 + 10 = 49	47	44 + 20 = 64	47	0	78	43	48 + 10 = 58
Rita & Simone	3	34	40	30	40		48	0	-	41 + 50 = 91	49
Luca & Veera	3	17	27	28	45		44	45	20	49 + 20 = 69	50
Nicole & Stefano	4	28	33 + 10 = 43	24	36		44	30	-	40	42
Daniel & Valeriia	4	16	29	29	42	44	45	30	82%	47 + 20 = 67	48
Platinette & Raimondo	7	26	26	18	20	21	28	30	-	30	
Asia & Maykel	8	26	18 + 10 = 28	21	40		30	0	39%		
Margareth & Samuel	9	18	26	27	36	42	35	8	18%		
Salvo & Alessandra	10	14	19	15	15	15		6			
Enrico & Ornella	11	20 + 10 = 30	20	18	35			9			
Pierre & Maria	12	28	19	17				7			
Lando & Sara	13	11	8					4			

Red numbers indicate the lowest score for each week.
Green numbers indicate the highest score for each week.
indicates the couple eliminated that week.
indicates the returning couples that finished in the bottom two/three was saved by a second public vote.
indicates the returning couples that finished in the top position and received a bonus for the next week.
indicates the returning couples that finished in the bottom position and received a malus for the next week.
indicates the returning couple that received a bonus.
indicates the couple who quit the competition.
indicates the couple who was ejected from the competition.
indicates the couple was voted back into the competition.
indicates the couple was voted back into the competition but then re-eliminated.
indicates the winning couple.
indicates the runner-up couple.
indicates the third-place couple.
