= Ballando con le Stelle series 10 =

Ballando con le Stelle
- Season 10
- Celebrity winner: Giusy Versace
- Professional winner: Raimondo Todaro

Release
- Original network: RAI 1
- Original release: 4 October 2014

Series chronology
- ← Previous; Series 9 Next → Series 11

The tenth series of Ballando con le Stelle was broadcast from 4 October 2014 to 6 December 2014 on RAI 1 and was presented by Milly Carlucci with Paolo Belli and his Big Band.

== Couples ==
Celebrity	Age	Occupation	Professional partner	Status
Vincent Candela	40	Footballer	Erell Niane	Eliminated 2nd on 11 October 2014
Teo Teocoli	69	Actor	Natalia Titova	Withdrew on 18 October 2014
Giorgio Albertazzi	91	Actor and Film director	Elena Coniglio	Withdrew on 18 October 2014
Katherine Kelly Lang	53	Actress and Fotomodel	Simone Di Pasquale	Eliminated 3rd on 18 October 2014
Marisa Laurito	63	Actress	Stefano Oradei	Eliminated 1st on 4 October 2014; Eliminated 4th on 1 November 2014
Tony Colombo	28	Singer	Anastasia Kuzmina	Eliminated 5th on 8 November 2014
Roberto Cammarelle	34	Boxer	Natalia Titova	Eliminated 6th on 8 November 2014
Joe Maska	40	Actor	Vera Kinnunen	Eliminated 7th on 15 November 2014
Dayane Mello	25	Model	Samuel Peron	Eliminated 8th on 29 November 2014
Enzo Miccio	43	TV Presenter	Alessandra Tripoli	Withdrew on 29 November 2014
Valerio Aspromonte	27	Fencer	Ekaterina Vaganova	Fifth place on 6 December 2014
Giorgia Surina	39	TV Host and actress	Maykel Fonts	Third place on 6 December 2014
Giulio Berruti	30	Actor	Samanta Togni	Third place on 6 December 2014
Andrew Howe	29	Pole vaulter	Sara Di Vaira	Second place on 6 December 2014
Giusy Versace	37	Paralympic athlete	Raimondo Todaro	Winners on 6 December 2014

== Scoring chart ==
Couple	Place	1	2	3	4	5	6	7	8	9	10
Giusy & Raimondo	1	44	40	41	50	IM	44	39	—	97	50
Andrew & Sara	2	31	46	42	34	IM	IM	85	—	96	70
Giulio & Samanta	3	32	45	44	34	IM	33	46	—	103	47
Giorgia & Maykel	3	22	26	45	35	92	IM	—	68	48	96
Valerio & Ekaterina	5	26	37	47	92	38	IM	40	—	78	50
Dayane & Samuel	6	26	41	45	36	IM	IM	36	32	53	
Enzo & Alessandra	7	23	30	35	28	IM	30	32	—	—	
Joe & Veera	8	75	32	80	22		IM	—	18		
Roberto & Natalia	9					27	91		26		
Tony & Anastasia	10				29	34	33		22		
Marisa & Stefano	11	20			34	27			25		
Katherine & Simone	12	25	23	18					31		
Giorgio & Elena	13	45	80	39							
Teo & Natalia	14	18	27	—							
Vincent & Erell	15	25	24						79		

== Bottom 3/4 ==
=== Week 1 ===
	Couple	First Dance	Dance-off Dance	% Votes
Saved by judges	Vincent & Erell	Charleston (25)	N/A	N/A
Saved by public	Giorgia & Maykel	Salsa (22)	Rumba	84%
Eliminated	Marisa & Stefano	Paso Doble (20)	Cha-Cha-Cha	16%

== Call-out order ==
The table below lists the order in which the contestants' fates were revealed. The order of the safe couples doesn't reflect the viewer voting results.

Order	1	2	3	4	5	6	7	8	9	10
1	Giorgio & Elena									
2	Giulio & Samanta									
3	Valerio & Ekaterina									
4	Dayane & Samuel									
5	Giusy & Raimondo									
6	Andrew & Sara									
7	Enzo & Alessandra									
8	Katherine & Simone									
9	Teo & Natalia									
10	Joe & Vera									
11	Vincent & Erell									
12	Giorgia & Maykel									
13	Marisa & Stefano									

This couple came in first place with the judges.
This couple came in last place with the judges.
This couple came in last place with the judges and was eliminated.
This couple came in first place with the judges and was eliminated.
This couple was eliminated.
This couple was voted back into the competition.
This couple was voted back into the competition but then re-eliminated.
This couple passed to the next round automatically.
This couple won the competition.
This couple came second in the competition.
This couple came third in the competition.
