= Ballando con le Stelle series 20 =

Ballando con le Stelle
- Season 20
- No. of episodes: 13

Release
- Original network: Rai 1
- Original release: 27 September – 20 December 2025

Series chronology
- ← Previous; Series 19

The twentieth series of Ballando con le Stelle was broadcast from 27 September 2025 to 20 December 2025 on Rai 1 and was presented by Milly Carlucci with Massimiliano Rosolino and the Big Band.

The edition once again sees the reduction of the competing couples to twelve, after the return to thirteen couples which occurred during the previous edition, and the further increase in the episodes from 12 to 13, becoming the edition with the longest duration in the history of the program.

The dancer Simone Di Pasquale, who had held the role of tribune during the previous three editions, returns to the competition as master, being replaced as tribune by the choreographer Matteo Addino, supported by the reconfirmed former master of the program Sara Di Vaira. As in the previous three editions, both have the possibility of drawing a pair eliminated each thanks to the mechanism called "wild card".

The first episode aired from 8.45pm, while starting from the second episode, the program airs from 9.30 pm to make room for Affari Tuoi.

Given the coincidence with Italy's qualifying match for the 2026 World Cup broadcast by Rai 1, the third episode on 11 October was exceptionally broadcast in the late evening starting from 10.50 pm.

As with the previous three editions, the program is accompanied by two spin-offs: Ballando Segreto, broadcast in streaming on RaiPlay from 26 September 2025 and focused on unpublished and "behind the scenes" content of the edition, and the eighth edition of Ballando on the Road, broadcast from 18 October 2025 as a preview on RaiPlay and in the late evening on Rai 1 at the end of the episode of Ballando con le Stelle.

== Couples and jury ==
Celebrity	Age	Occupation	Professional partner	Status
Beppe Convertini	54	Television presenter & actor	Veera Kinnunen	Eliminated 1st 1 November 2025
Mrs. Coriandoli	72	Drag queen & comedian	Simone Di Pasquale	Eliminated 2nd 8 November 2025
Marcella Bella	73	Singer	Chiquito	Eliminated 3rd 15 November 2025
Nancy Brilli	61	Actress	Carlo Aloia	Eliminated 4th 22 November 2025
Nancy Brilli	61	Actress	Filippo Zara	Eliminated 4th 22 November 2025
Paolo Belli	63	Singer & television presenter	Anastasia Kuzmina	Eliminated 5th 29 November 2025; Voted back 6 December 2025; Eliminated 6th 20 December 2025
Rosa Chemical	27	Rapper & songwriter	Erica Martinelli	Fifth place 20 December 2025
Martina Colombari	50	Actress & television presenter, former Miss Italia	Luca Favilla	Fifth place 20 December 2025
Filippo Magnini	43	Former Olympic swimmer	Alessandra Tripoli	Fifth place 20 December 2025
Fabio Fognini	38	Former tennis player	Giada Lini	Third place 20 December 2025
Barbara D'Urso	68	Television presenter & actress	Pasquale La Rocca	Third place 20 December 2025
Francesca Fialdini	45	Television presenter	Giovanni Pernice	Withdrew; 15 November 2025; Voted back 6 December 2025; Second place 20 December 2025
Andrea Delogu	43	Television & radio presenter	Nikita Perotti	Winners; 20 December 2025

=== Jury ===
- Ivan Zazzaroni
- Fabio Canino
- Carolyn Smith (Jury's president)
- Selvaggia Lucarelli
- Guillermo Mariotto

=== Opinionist ===
- Alberto Matano

=== Popular tribunes ===
- Rossella Erra
- Matteo Addino
- Sara di Vaira

== Scoring chart ==
Couple	Place	1	2	3	4	5	6	7	8	9	10	11	12	13
Andrea & Nikita	1	38	42	41	43+25=68	44	—		46	43+30=73	50+25=75	41	43	49
Francesca & Giovanni	2	43	46+30=76	46+30=76	48+10=58	49	2	44+25=69	—			50+25=75	49	50
Barbara & Pasquale	3	39	37	47	46+10+25=81	37+10=47	47	47+10=57	38+50=88	45+10+20=75	47+10=57	40	47+30=77	47
Fabio & Giada	3	26	28	36	44	42	49+25=74	48+10=58	48	37+25=62	41+25=66	43	43	42
Filippo & Alessandra	5	38	27+25=52	41	41	48	47	42	47	47+10+25=82	48	39	44	45
Martina & Luca	5	35	34	37+25=62	41	47+25=72	48	48+3=51	49	46+20=66	48	48	47+30=77	41
Rosa & Erica	5	42	40	36	45	40	40	40	45	38	40	44	45	50-20=30
Paolo & Anastasia	8	40	37	34	38	26	40	46+5+25=76	34	45+30=75	39	40	37	
Nancy & Carlo/Filippo	9	22+25=47	23	34	38	36	39	43	25	22		40		
Marcella & Chiquito	10	31	27+25=52	29	33-10=23	14+25=39	28+25=53	37				34		
Mrs. Coriandoli & Simone	11	12	26	25	22-10=12	22	27-20=7					20+25=45		
Beppe & Veera	12	10+25=35	10	10+25=35	26	26	13					19		

Red numbers indicate the lowest score for each week.
Green numbers indicate the highest score for each week.
indicates the couple eliminated that week.
indicates the returning couples that finished in the bottom two/three was saved by a second public vote.
indicates the returning couples that finished in the top position and received a bonus for the next week.
indicates the returning couples that finished in the bottom position and received a malus for the next week.
indicates the returning couple that received a bonus.
indicates the couple who quit the competition.
indicates the couple who does not compete in the episode.
indicates the couple who was ejected from the competition.
indicates the couple was voted back into the competition.
indicates the couple was eliminated but was voted back into the competition by "wild card".
indicates the couple was voted back into the competition but then re-eliminated.
indicates the winning couple.
indicates the runner-up couple.
indicates the third-place couple.
