= Ballando con le Stelle series 19 =

Ballando con le Stelle
- Season 19
- Celebrity winner: Bianca Guaccero
- Professional winner: Giovanni Pernice

Release
- Original network: RAI 1
- Original release: 28 September – 21 December 2024

Series chronology
- ← Previous; Series 18 Next → Series 20

The nineteenth series of Ballando con le Stelle was broadcast from 28 September 2024 to 21 December 2024 on RAI 1 and was presented by Milly Carlucci with Paolo Belli and his Big Band.

== Couples ==
Celebrity	Age	Occupation	Professional partner	Status
I Cugini di Campagna	Various	Pop band	Rebecca Gabrielli	Eliminated 1st 19 October 2024
Nina Zilli	44	Singer-songwriter & Eurovision star	Pasquale La Rocca	Withdrew; 2 November 2024
Alan Friedman	68	Journalist & author	Giada Lini	Eliminated 2nd 2 November 2024
Furkan Palalı	37	Actor	Erica Martinelli	Eliminated 3rd 9 November 2024
Sonia Bruganelli	50	TV personality & entrepreneur	Carlo Aloia	Eliminated 4th 23 November 2024
Massimiliano Ossini	45	Television presenter	Veera Kinnunen	Eliminated 6th 23 November 2024
Francesco Paolantoni	68	Actor & comedian	Anastasia Kuzmina	Eliminated 5th 23 November 2024; Voted back 30 November 2024; Eliminated 7th 14 December 2024
Luca Barbareschi	68	Actor, producer & television presenter	Alessandra Tripoli	Fourth place 21 December 2024
Anna Lou Castoldi	23	Actress & DJ	Nikita Perotti	Fourth place 21 December 2024
Tommaso Marini	24	Olympic fencer	Sophia Berto	Fourth place 21 December 2024
Federica Nargi	34	Model & showgirl	Luca Favilla	Third place 21 December 2024
Federica Pellegrini	36	Former Olympic swimmer	Angelo Madonia	Second place 21 December 2024
Federica Pellegrini	36	Former Olympic swimmer	Samuel Peron	Second place 21 December 2024
Federica Pellegrini	36	Former Olympic swimmer	Pasquale La Rocca	Second place 21 December 2024
Bianca Guaccero	43	Television presenter & actress	Giovanni Pernice	Winners; 21 December 2024

== Scoring chart ==
Couple	Place	1	2	3	4	5	6	7	8	9	10	11	12
Bianca & Giovanni	1	37	48+30=78	50+20+25=95	47	45	50+25=75	44+25=69	47+20=67	46	38	50+10+90=150	40+30=70
Federica & Angelo/Pasquale	2	24+30=54	32	35	39	42	38	45	39+30=69	48+20+25=93	37+25=62	50+30=80	39
Federica & Luca	3	33	37	46	47	44+25=69	50	50+25=75	50+30=80	50+30+25=105	39	50	40
Tommaso & Sophia	4	35	29	41	32	42	44	48	46	41	35+25=60	39	35
Anna Lou & Nikita	4	34	38+24=62	43	48	49+25=74	47+30=77	44	29	47	36	46	36
Luca & Alessandra	4	38+30=68	45	48+25=73	40	45	49	44	44+30=74	45+10=55	34	44	31-20=11
Francesco & Anastasia	7	24	23	12	19	33	32	35	30	31	62	30	
Massimiliano & Veera	8	23	23	22	39	32	31+25=56	27	44+10=54	43	71		
Sonia & Carlo	9	22	18	27	31-20=11	32	25	33	21		31		
Furkan & Erica	10	17	17	20	30	36	41	25			34		
Alan & Giada	11	26	31	29	19+25=44	16	24				27		
Nina & Pasquale	12	41	47+25=72	38+20=58	43+25=68	34	—						
Cugini & Rebecca	13	21	22	33	20						32		

Red numbers indicate the lowest score for each week.
Green numbers indicate the highest score for each week.
indicates the couple eliminated that week.
indicates the returning couples that finished in the bottom two/three was saved by a second public vote.
indicates the returning couples that finished in the top position and received a bonus for the next week.
indicates the returning couples that finished in the bottom position and received a malus for the next week.
indicates the returning couple that received a bonus.
indicates the couple who quit the competition.
indicates the couple who was ejected from the competition.
indicates the couple was voted back into the competition.
indicates the couple was eliminated but was voted back into the competition by "wild card".
indicates the couple was voted back into the competition but then re-eliminated.
indicates the winning couple.
indicates the runner-up couple.
indicates the third-place couple.
