= Alex Belli =

Italian model, media personality and actor (born 1982)

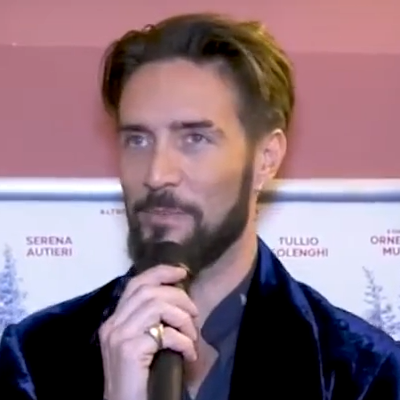
- Belli in 2022
- Born: Alessandro Gabelli; 22 December 1982 (age 43); Parma, Italy
- Occupations: Model; actor; television personality; musician
- Years active: 2009–present
- Partner(s): Hellen Scopel; Katarina Raniakova; Cristina Buccino; Mila Suarez; Delia Duran; Soleil Sorge
- Website: http://www.alexbelli.it/

Alex Belli (born 22 December 1982) is an Italian model, actor and television personality.

== Biography ==
Alessandro Gabelli, birthname of Alex Belli, is the first of four sons: he is best known for his role Jacopo Castelli from 2010 to 2016 in the daytime soap opera CentoVetrine. In 2005 he started his career as a model in London, Paris, New York City and Milan. In the winter of 2012 he took part (with Bobo Vieri, Andrés Gil, Anna Tatangelo, Ria Antoniou, Ariadna Romero and other contestant) in the eighth series of the Italian talent show Ballando con le Stelle hosted on Rai 1 by Milly Carlucci with Paolo Belli and his Big Band.

After his love story with the Italian model Hellen Scopel, Belli in February 2013 married the Slovakian model Katarina Raniakova: in March 2017 they divorced and shortly after the media scandal he participated (together with Stefano De Martino and others) in Selfie - Le cose cambiano, a television production of Maria De Filippi's Fascino PGT in the prime time of Canale 5 and hosted by Simona Ventura. In the winter of 2015 Belli took part (with Cecilia Rodriguez, Charlotte Caniggia, Cristina Buccino, Fanny Neguesha and other contestant) in the tenth series of the Italian reality show L'isola dei famosi hosted by Alessia Marcuzzi with Alvin in the prime time of Canale 5 and won by Le Donatella.

From 2017 to 2019 Belli had a love relationship, often at the center of the Italian gossip news, with the Moroccan model Mila Suarez; in June 2021 he married, after two years of love relationship, the Venezuelan model and actress Delia Duran, with whom Belli had participated in the second series of the Italian dating-love show Temptation Island VIP, a television production of the Maria De Filippi's agency Fascino PGT that was aired in late 2019 (September–October) in the prime time of Canale 5 and hosted by Alessia Marcuzzi.

Belli in late 2021, from September to December, took part (with Kabir Bedi, Katia Ricciarelli, Manila Nazzaro, Ainett Stephens, Jo Squillo, Aldo Montano, Carmen Russo, Francesca Cipriani, Raffaella Fico and other contestant) in the sixth series of Grande Fratello VIP hosted by Alfonso Signorini and aired on Canale 5; in this reality show the sentimental story between Belli and fellow contestant Soleil Stasi (pseudonym of Soleil Anastasia Sorge) caused a stir in the Italian media, but this is not his first "love scandal" during his roles in television: in 2015, during his participation in L'isola dei famosi 10, he caused a stir due to an alleged liaison with Cristina Buccino.

== Filmography ==
=== Films ===
Year	Title	Role(s)	Notes
2013	Un'insolita vendemmia	Alessandro	
2017	The Broken Key	Snake	
2019	Dagli occhi dell'amore	Daniel	Direct-to-video

=== Television ===
Year	Title	Role(s)	Notes
2010–2016	CentoVetrine	Jacopo Castelli	Main role (seasons 10–15)
2012	Ballando con le Stelle	Contestant	8th place (season 8)
2015	L'isola dei famosi	Contestant	Reality show
2017–2018	Sacrificio d'amore	Livio Farnesi	Recurring role
2018	Furore	Luigi Grollero	Main role (season 2)
2021	Grande Fratello VIP	Contestant	27th place (season 6)
