= Veronica Olivier =

Italian actress and television personality

- Born: 1 February 1990 (age 36); Velletri, Italy
- Occupation: Actress
- Website: http://www.veronicaolivier.it

Veronica Olivier (born 1 February 1990) is an Italian actress and television personality.

== Career ==
Olivier first became well known for her starring role in the 2009 Italian film Amore 14. In 2010 she participated in the sixth season of Ballando con le stelle, the Italian version of Dancing with the Stars. Paired with Raimondo Todaro, Olivier won the competition.

== Filmography ==
=== Cinema ===
Year	Film	Role	Other notes
2009	Amore 14	Carolina	Directed by Federico Moccia

=== Television ===
Year	Film	Role	Other notes
2010	Ballando con le stelle	Reality show contestant	Won the competition with partner Raimondo Todaro
2011	Attenti a quei due		
