= Ria Antoniou =

Greek fashion model

Ria Antoniou Ρία Αντωνίου
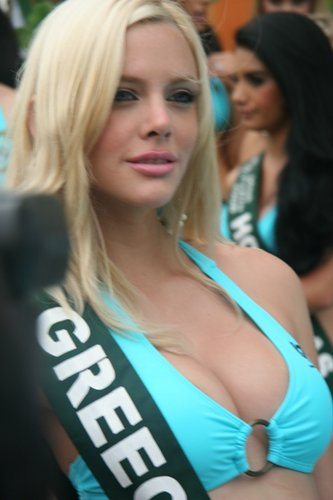
- Ria Antoniou at the Miss Earth 2008 press presentation (28 November 2008)
- Born: Georgia Antoniou; 14 July 1988 (age 38); Athens, Greece
- Modeling information
- Height: 1.76 m (5 ft 9.5 in)
- Hair color: Blond
- Eye color: Blue

Ria Antoniou (Greek: Ρία Αντωνίου, [ˈria adoˈniu]; born 14 July 1988) is a Greek model and beauty pageant titleholder. In her career she became the winner of Miss Peloponnese 2007 and of Star Hellas – Miss Earth Greece 2008, the runner-up in Sexiest Woman Alive 2008, the 2nd runner-up in Miss Model of the World 2007. She was also the "official Greek representative from Star Hellas" in Miss Earth 2008. She is also a singer, actress, television personality, internet celebrity and model. She has become a sex symbol of the 2000s and 2010s.

== Biography ==
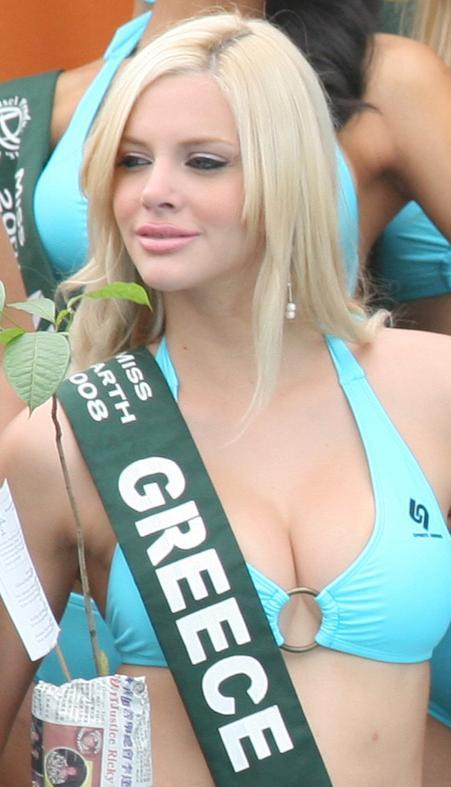
Ria Antoniou, Star Hellas 2008

Being half Peloponnesian, in 2007 Ria entered and won the Miss Peloponnese pageant and represented Greece in the Model of the World pageant and placed 2nd runner-up. Antoniou, after that pageant, was appointed by the Star Hellas Organization to represent Greece in Miss Earth 2008 on 9 November 2008, in Angeles City, Philippines. Antoniou posed many times for Nitro, Playboy, Esquire, and others. From 7 January 2012 to 17 March 2012 Ria took part (with Bobo Vieri, Alex Belli, Andrés Gil, Anna Tatangelo, Ariadna Romero and others contestants) on the 8th series of Ballando con le Stelle, the Italian version of Dancing with the Stars hosted by Milly Carlucci with Paolo Belli and his Big Band and aired by Rai 1 in the prime time of saturday, the most important time slot in the Italian television: in this talent show Ria was paired with Raimondo Todaro and they finished at the third place in the final episode.

From 24 March 2012 to 7 April 2012 Antoniou hosted with Paolo Belli and Milly Carlucci the first season of Ballando con te, a program of dance aired by Rai 1; on 8 December 2012 Ria was the host of the 2012 edition of The Look of the Year Fashion Awards with Nino Graziano Luca. Ria in April 2016 recited, together with Massimo Boldi and Max Tortora, in the movie La coppia dei campioni, directed by Giulio Base. Antoniou in September 2016 became the new primadonna – flanked by four dancers – of the 18th edition, hosted by the comic duo Luca e Paolo, of the comedy show Colorado aired on Italia 1, the network in which Ria holds since September 2013 the role of showgirl and opinonist in the sports talk show Tiki Taka - Il calcio è il nostro gioco hosted by Pierluigi Pardo with Melissa Satta: in August 2018, Satta (as Pardo's co-host) and Antoniou as showgirl and opinionist were replaced by Wanda Nara.

Ria Antoniou in November 2016 recited as female lead in the movie Non si ruba a casa dei ladri, directed by Carlo Vanzina. Ria in August 2017 posed naked for the 2018 nude calendar of For Men Magazine. Antoniou at the end of 2017 was announced as the Sexiest Greek model for the year 2017 among other 143 contestants on the Greek men's magazine Kafto. During the 2017–2018 season Ria took part in the late-night variety show of Rai 2 Sbandati, hosted by the comic duo Gigi e Ross, with the role of "stable commentator" (opinionista fissa) with various people. In the summer of 2018 Antoniou was the only female commentator and showgirl in the sports talk show, hosted by Pierluigi Pardo and aired by Italia 1, Tiki Taka Russia.

| Preceded by Eugenia Lattou (2006); None in 2007 | Star Hellas – Miss Earth Greece; Greek Representative from Star Hellas; 2008 | Succeeded by Triantafyllia Sarantinou (2009); Miss Earth Greece / Model Agency |
