= Dancesport at the 2005 World Games – Latin =

Dancesport latin at the 2005 World Games
- Venue: König Pilsener Arena
- Date: 16 July 2001
- Competitors: 50 from 25 nations

Medalists
1st place, gold medalist(s)		Eugene Katsevman; Maria Manusova	United States
2nd place, silver medalist(s)		Peter Stokkebroe; Kristina Juel Stokkebroe	Denmark
3rd place, bronze medalist(s)		Stefano Di Filippo; Annalisa Di Filippo	Italy

The Latin competition in dancesport at the 2005 World Games took place on 16 July 2005 at the König Pilsener Arena in Oberhausen, Germany.

== Competition format ==
A total of 25 were registered for the competition. Best ten pairs from round one qualifies directly to the semifinal. In redance additional four pairs qualifies to the semifinal. From semifinal the best six pairs qualifies to the final. Two pairs didn't enter the competition.

== Results ==
Rank	Athletes	Nation	Round 1	Redance	Semifinal	Final
1st place, gold medalist(s)	Eugene Katsevman/Maria Manusova	United States	Q		Q	1
2nd place, silver medalist(s)	Peter Stokkebroe/Kristina Juel Stokkebroe	Denmark	Q		Q	2
3rd place, bronze medalist(s)	Stefano Di Filippo/Annalisa Di Filippo	Italy	Q		Q	3
4	Denis Kuznetsov/Mariya Tzaptashvili	Russia	Q		Q	4
5	Zoran Plohl/Tatsiana Lahvinovich	Slovenia	Q		Q	5
6	Andrius Kandelis/Eglė Visockaitė-Kandelis	Lithuania	Q		Q	6
7	Andrej Mosejcuk/Susanne Miscenko	Germany	Q			
8	Ojars Bacis/Santa Lodina	Latvia	Q			
9	Masaki Seko/Chiaki Seko	Japan	Q			
9	Dorin Frecautanu/Elena Rabinovici	Moldova	Q			
11	Iban Salgado/Adriana Torrebadella	Spain		Q		
12	Natan Meyers/Karina Schembri	Australia		Q		
12	Alexander Leivikov/Yulia Lesokhina	Israel		Q		
12	Dmytro Vlokh/Olga Uromova	Ukraine		Q		
15	Jakub Davidek/Michaela Gatěková	Czech Republic				
16	Guy Rosen/Viktorya Fadina	Luxembourg				
17	Trendafil Sarmov/Radosrina Ivanova	Bulgaria				
18	Toni Touminen/Soile Näsänen	Finland				
19	Mark-Bruce Sasnovski/Liezi Jooste	South Africa				
20	Cedric Meyer/Angelique Meyer	France				
21	Michael Mendoza/Belinda Adora	Philippines				
21	Watcharakom Susasuebpan/Warapa Jumbaia	Thailand				
23	Charles Wang/Janet Hsiao	Chinese Taipei				
	Sonny Zhang/Cher Luo	China	DNS			
	Marcin Hakiel/Magdalena Soszyńska	Poland	DNS			
