= Barbara Capponi =

Italian journalist

Barbara Capponi (born 13 January 1968) is an Italian journalist and television presenter.

== Biography ==
Raised in Pedaso, in 1985 she participated in the Miss Italia beauty contest, winning the title of Miss Marche. She graduated in law from the University of Macerata, but she has never practiced the profession of lawyer despite having passed the state exam.

After her first journalistic experiences on Il Messaggero and Corriere Adriatico and television on local broadcasters, she began collaborating with Raiuno in 1997, hosting a TG1 column for a few months. Later, after being an editor on the show Donne al bivio she joined Unomattina as a collaborator on the texts and correspondent. Since 2000 she has been one of the correspondents of La vita in diretta. In 2004, she joined the editorial team of the morning news of Tg1 and since 2008 she has been in the editorial team of TG1 economy. In May 2010 she became one of the presenters of the morning editions of TG1. Since 2010 he has collaborated on TG1 first hosting the 8:00 edition, and then, since 2016 the 4.30 pm edition. In 2011, she participated in Ballando con le stelle as a contestant, paired with the dancer Samuel Peron. In 2013, she made her debut as a presenter in Estate in diretta (broadcast from 3 June to 6 September on Rai 1)alongside Marco Liorni.

In the summer of 2018, she led the Notte della Taranta on Rai 5. In 2019 and 2020 she sporadically hosted the 1:30 PM edition of TG1. In December of 2019 she replaced Valentina Bisti as host of Unomattina. In summer 2020 she hosted Unomattina Estate with Alessandro Baracchini. Also in 2020, she received the Premio la Moda Veste la Pace for her social commitment on the proposal of African Fashion Gate ApS, the recognition whose ceremony was celebrated at the European Parliament of Brussels with its high patronage. From 10 to 12 March 2021, she replaced Marco Frittella as host of Unomattina. In the summer of 2021, she returned to hosting Unomattina Estate, this time supported by Gianmarco Sicuro.

== Television ==
- Miss Italia (Canale 5, 1985) contestant
- TG1 (Rai 1, dal 2010)
- Ballando con le stelle (Rai 1, 2011) contestant
- Estate in diretta (Rai 1, 2013)
- Notte della Taranta (Rai 5, 2018)
- Senato & Cultura (Rai 5, 2019)
- Unomattina (Rai 1, 2019, 2021)
- Unomattina Estate (Rai 1, 2020-2021)
- #OnePeopleOnePlanet - Earth Day 2021 (RaiPlay, 2021)
