= Sara Santostasi =

Italian actress, singer and dancer

- Born: 24 January 1993 (age 33); Anzio, Italy
- Occupations: Actress; singer; dancer; dance teacher
- Years active: 2000–present

Sara Santostasi (born 24 January 1993) is an Italian actress, singer and dancer. She was one of the contestants in seventh series of Ballando con le Stelle, the Italian version of Dancing with the Stars.

== Filmography ==
=== Films ===
Year	Title	Role	Notes
2000	Ali	The Girl	Short film
2003	Uomini & Donne, Amori & Bugie	Little Girl	Cameo appearance
2003	The Lizzie McGuire Movie	Fan #1	Uncredited
2005	I giorni dell'abbandono	Ilaria	
2011	Balla con noi	Antonella	
2016	La vincita	Sofia	Short film
2017	Inferno	Natalia	Short film

=== Television ===
Year	Title	Role	Notes
2004	Don Matteo	Camilla	Main role (season 4); 24 episodes
2005–2006	Incantesimo	Sara	Main role (season 8); 27 episodes
2007–2010	Donna Detective	Ludovica Mattei	Main role; 22 episodes
2009	Il commissario Manara	Nelly	Episode: "Le verità nascoste"
2009	Chiamatemi Giò	Giorgina "Giò" Manzi	Lead role; 35 episodes
2011	Ballando con le Stelle	Herself	Contestant (season 7)
2011	Cenerentola	Young Lucia	Miniseries

=== Stage ===
Year	Title	Role	Notes
2014–2018	Dirty Dancing: The Classic Story on Stage	Frances "Baby" Houseman	Lead actress
