= L'altra domenica =

- Country of origin: Italy
- Original language: Italian
- No. of seasons: 3

Original release
- Network: Rai 2
- Release: March 28, 1976 – May 27, 1979

L’altra domenica ("Another Side of Sunday") is an Italian Sunday afternoon variety show, broadcast on Rai 2 between 1976 and 1979. It is regarded as one of the most innovative shows in Italian television. This show saw Milly Carlucci make her debut.

== Background ==
Created and hosted by Renzo Arbore, it was inspired by Arbore's radio program Alto gradimento. During its first season, the program alternated serious football reports with variety show. Starting its second season, it focused on humor. Its cast included Roberto Benigni playing a surrealistic cinematographic critic, Andy Luotto, Maurizio Nichetti (who also cured with Guido Manuli some animated segments), the transgender musical group Sorelle Bandiera, whose song "Fatti più in là" they launched in the show became a hit, Giorgio Bracardi and Milly Carlucci. Isabella Rossellini, Mario Marenco and Michel Pergolani cured semi-serious live reports from New York City, Rome and London. The show was the first Italian live program to use telephone to interact with its audience, in this case through a humorous quiz. It has been referred to as "a breath of fresh air for the intelligent and the curious" and "a monument in Italian television history".
