= Giorgia Surina =

Italian television personality

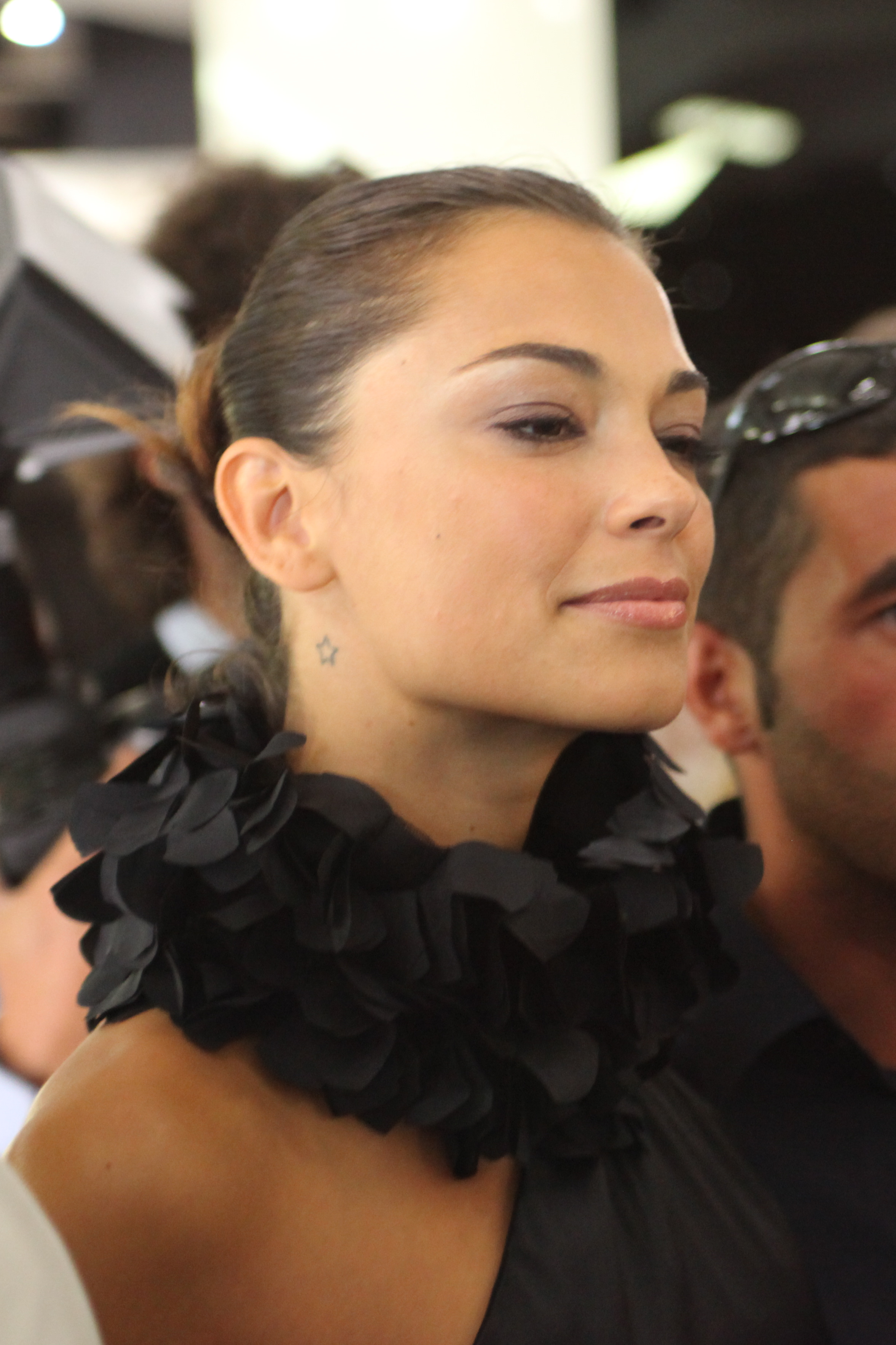
Giorgia Surina in 2009

Giorgia Surina (born 8 March 1975, in Milan) is an Italian television personality known for presenting TRL Italy, the Italian version of Total Request Live broadcast by MTV Italia. She has also starred in some movies, such as Una talpa al bioparco and the TV series RIS Delitti Imperfetti and the third season of Love Bugs.

== Filmography ==
=== Films ===
Year	Title	Role	Notes
2002	Come se fosse amore	Amalia	
2004	Una talpa al bioparco	Giorgia	
2010	Somewhere	TV Reporter	Cameo
2011	Lezioni di cioccolato 2	Giorgia	
2011	Come trovare nel modo giusto l'uomo sbagliato	Alice	
2013	Sono un pirata, sono un signore	Mirella	
2020	Néo Kosmo	Alessia	Short

=== Television ===
Year	Title	Role	Notes
2007	Love Bugs	Giorgia / Various	Main role (season 3)
2008	RIS Delitti Imperfetti	Michela Riva	Recurring role; 3 episodes
2011	Un medico in famiglia	Virginia Battaglia	Recurring role; 5 episodes
2012	6 passi nel giallo	Isabella Leoni	Episode: "Souvenirs"
2012	Inspector Nardone	Eliana	Main role
2012	Il misteri di Villa Sabrini	Cosima Bertone	Television film
2014	Ballando con le Stelle	Contestant	Third place (season 10)
2014–2020	Don Matteo	Bianca Venezia	Recurring role; 14 episodes
2016	Non dirlo al mio capo	Marta Castelli	Main role (season 1)
