= Pamela Camassa =

Italian television presenter, actress and model

- Born: 22 April 1984 (age 42); Prato
- Height: 1.79 m (5 ft and 10 in)
- Beauty pageant titleholder
- Hair color: Light brown
- Eye color: Green
- Major competition: Miss World Italy

Pamela Camassa (born April 1984) is an Italian television presenter, actress and model.

== Biography ==
Pamela Camassa was born in Prato, where she graduated in economy at ITC Dagomari.

== Career ==
In 2000 she participated in the film Via del Corso of Adolfo Lippi, where she played the role of the protagonist together with Laura Chiatti and Ilaria Spada. In the summer of 2002 she won the title of "Miss World Italy" obtaining the opportunity to represent Italy at Miss World 2002, but she gave up as a sign of protest towards the treatment towards women of the host country, Nigeria: in her place Susanne Zuber went as representative of Italy. In September 2005 she ranked third in the Miss Italy 2005 contest, an edition later won by Edelfa Chiara Masciotta. In spring 2006 she made her debut on television, as showgirl for Carlo Conti in the show I raccomandati aired on Rai 1, together with Laura Barriales and Natalia Bush. In autumn 2006, paired with the dancer Angelo Madonia, she participated in the talent show Ballando con le Stelle and ranked second: in 2007 he repeated the experience by taking part in the Ukrainian edition of the same program.

In autumn 2012 she participated as a competitor in the second edition of Tale e Quale show, the Rai 1 program conducted by Carlo Conti, becoming one of the revelation characters according to critics and therefore participated in the spin-off Torneo dei Campioni and in the special episode I Duetti. In the winter of 2013 she was co-host of the sixth edition of I migliori anni on Rai 1.

== Personal life ==
She is in a relationship with actor Filippo Bisciglia.
