= Ladri di Biciclette (band) =

Italian band

Ladri di Biciclette is an Italian funky-R&B band, mainly successful between late 1980s and early 1990s.

== Career ==
The group formed in 1984 in Carpi by some students of the Verona Conservatory as a revivalist band, inspired by The Blues Brothers. They held their first concerts in 1986, and after focusing on black music classics starting from 1987 they began producing original songs, generally composed by band members Paolo Belli and Enrico Prandi.

In 1989 the band was put under contract by EMI, and entered the newcomer competition at the 39th edition of the Sanremo Music Festival with the manifesto song "Ladri di Biciclette", being eliminated. In spite of the rejection, the song got a large success, as well as the summer single "Dr. Jazz & Mr. Funk", which won the newcomer section of the Festivalbar, and their debut album Ladri di Biciclette, which was certified gold and sold over 150,000 copies.

In 1990, after touring with Vasco Rossi as opening act, the group won the Festivalbar competition and peaked the Italian hit parade with the song "Sotto questo sole", a duet with singer-songwriter Francesco Baccini. In 1991 they returned to compete at the Sanremo Music Festival, this time in the big artists section, with "Sbatti ben su del be-bop", then, at the end of the year, the frontman Paolo Belli left the band to pursue a solo career.

In 1993 the band participated to their last Sanremo Music Festival with "Cambiamo Musica", a duet with Tony Esposito, being eliminated from the finals. In 1994, they released their last album, Tre.

== Discography ==
Albums

- 1989 – Ladri di biciclette
- 1991 – Figli di un do minore
- 1994 – Tre
