= Alessandro Egger =

Italian-Serbian male model and actor

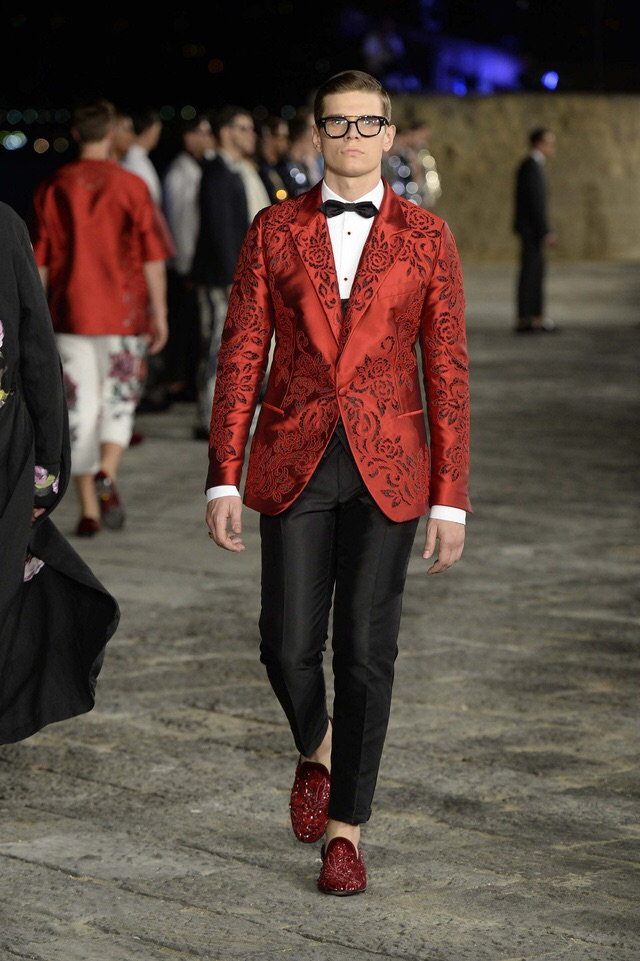
Alessandro Egger

Alessandro Egger (born September 6, 1991) is an Italian-Serbian male model and actor. He is recognised as Nick in the teen-drama situation comedy called The Band. He is known for being present in most of the Dolce & Gabbana fashion shows since the beginning of his career.

== Personal life ==
Egger was born in Belgrade, Republic of Serbia, and moved to Como, Italy, when he was 6 years old. He lives in Milan.

== Career ==
Egger's career started at age 13 with a TV commercial.

Throughout his actor career, Egger has worked with in series like Un medico in famiglia with Lino Banfi and films like Shades of Truth with Christopher Lambert and Giancarlo Giannini.

In 2017 he joined the adventure game Pechino Express hosted by Costantino della Gherardesca.

In 2022 he has taken part in the Italian dancing show Ballando con le stelle.

In 2024 he has won the Italian reality game show La talpa (De Mol).
