= Bruno Cabrerizo =

Brazilian footballer, model, and actor (born 1979)

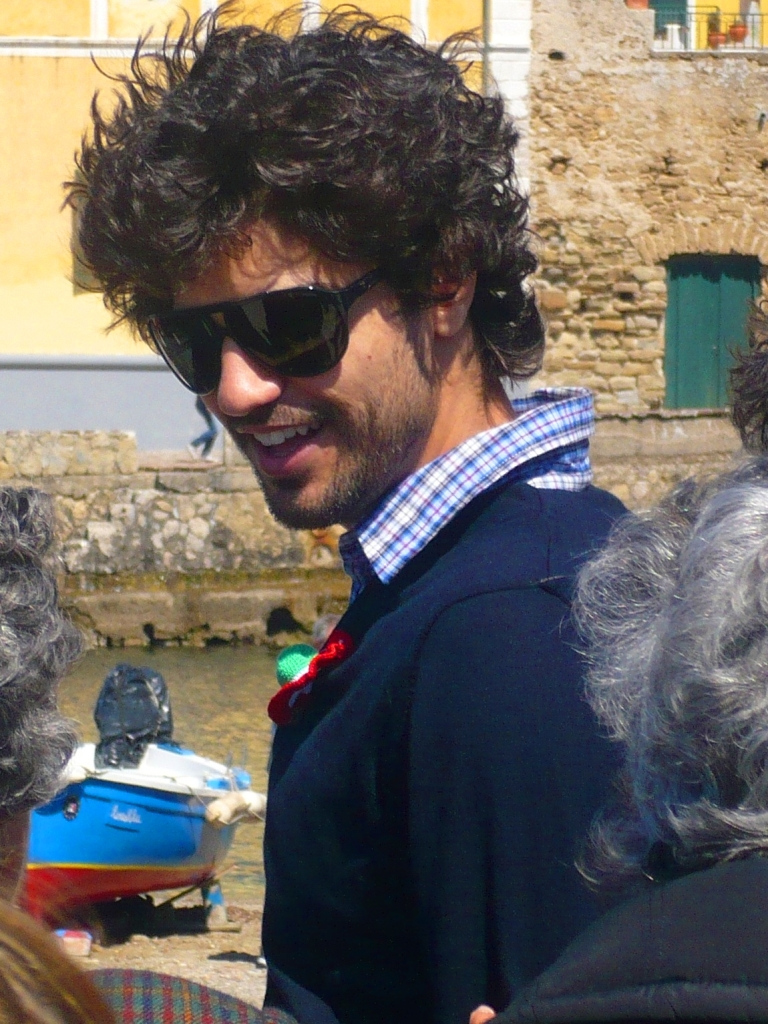

Personal information
- Full name: Bruno Cabrerizo
- Date of birth: July 19, 1979 (age 47)
- Place of birth: Rio de Janeiro, Brazil
- Height: 1.85 m (6 ft 1 in)
- Position: Defender

Senior career*
Years	Team	Apps	(Gls)
2003	Sagan Tosu	13	(1)
- * Club domestic league appearances and goals

Bruno Cabrerizo (born July 19, 1979) is a former Brazilian football player, model and actor.

== Career ==
Cabrerizo joined Japanese J2 League club Sagan Tosu in 2003. He debuted as defensive midfielder in J2 against Shonan Bellmare on April 9. He played many matches as defensive midfielder and center back after the debut. He left Sagan in July.

== Club statistics ==
Club performance			League		Cup		Total	
Season	Club	League	Apps	Goals	Apps	Goals	Apps	Goals
Japan			League		Emperor's Cup		Total	
2003	Sagan Tosu	J2 League	13	1			13	1
Total			13	1	0	0	13	1

== Filmography ==
Year	Program	Format	Role	Channel
2009	Cosi fan tutte	TV series		Italia 1
2010	Salsa Rosa	Television program	Presenter	Comedy Central
2011	Don Matteo	TV series		RAI 1
2011	Ballando con le stelle		Participation	RAI 1
2011	TRL Awards		Presenter	MTV
2014	Centovetrine	Soap opera		Canale 5
2015	A Única Mulher	Soap opera	Santiago Ortiz	TVI
2017	Ouro Verde	Telenovela	Laurentino da Silva	TVI
2017	Tempo de Amar	Telenovela	Inácio	Rede Globo
2019	Órfãos da Terra	Telenovela	Hussein Zarif	Rede Globo
2021	A Máscara	Music competition	Banana (contestant)	SIC
2021	Quanto Mais Vida, Melhor!	Telenovela	Marcelo	Rede Globo
