= Ballando con le Stelle =

Italian edition of Dancing with the Stars

- Created by: Richard Hopkins; Fenia Vardanis
- Based on: Dancing with the Stars; Strictly Come Dancing
- Presented by: Milly Carlucci; Paolo Belli
- Judges: Guillermo Mariotto; Amanda Lear; Roberto Flemack; Heather Parisi; Ivan Zazzaroni; Lina Wertmüller; Espen Salberg; Carolyn Smith; Fabio Canino; Lamberto Sposini; Rafael Amargo; Selvaggia Lucarelli; Barbara D'Urso; Alberto Matano
- Country of origin: Italy
- No. of seasons: 21
- No. of episodes: 205

Original release
- Network: Rai 1
- Release: 8 January 2005 – present

Ballando con le Stelle is the Italian version of the British reality TV competition Strictly Come Dancing and is part of the Dancing with the Stars franchise.

It was first broadcast on 8 January 2005 on TV station Rai 1. The show is aired in prime time, typically on Saturday evenings, and is hosted by Milly Carlucci with Paolo Belli and his orchestra. It is one of RAI's most important and successful programmes.

== Overview ==
Season	Year(s)	Broadcast dates	No. of episodes	No. of couples	Winners	Runners-up	Third place
1	2005	8 January – 26 February	8	8	Hoara Borselli & Simone Di Pasquale	Francesco Salvi & Natalia Titova	Gianni Ippoliti & Valentina Vincenzi
2	2005-6	17 September – 6 January	11 (+4 special)	12 (+8 special)	Cristina Chiabotto & Raimondo Todaro	Loredana Cannata & Samuel Peron	Vincenzo Peluso & Natalia Titova
3	2006-7	16 September – 6 January	11 (+4 special)	14 (+8 special)	Fiona May & Raimondo Todaro	Pamela Camassa & Angelo Madonia	Antonio Cupo & Giada Giacomoni
4	2007	28 September – 23 November	9	12	Maria Elena Vandone & Samuel Peron	Anna Falchi & Stefano Di Filippo	Ivan Zazzaroni & Natalia Titova
5	2009	10 January – 21 March	10	12	Emanuele Filiberto of Savoy & Natalia Titova	Andrea Montovoli & Ola Karieva	Alessio Di Clemente & Alessandra Mason
6	2010	9 January – 20 March	10	12	Veronica Olivier & Raimondo Todaro	Ronn Moss & Sara Di Vaira	Barbara De Rossi & Simone Di Pasquale
7	2011	26 February – 30 April	10	12	Kaspar Capparoni & Yulia Musikhina	Sara Santostasi & Umberto Gaudino	Vittoria Belvedere & Stefano Di Filippo; Bruno Cabrerizo & Ola Karieva (Joint third place)
8	2012	7 January – 17 March	10	13	Andrés Gil & Anastasia Kuzmina	Marco Delvecchio & Sara Di Vaira	Ria Antoniou & Raimondo Todaro; Anna Tatangelo & Stefano Di Filippo (Joint third place)
9	2013	5 October – 7 December	10	13	Elisa Di Francisca & Raimondo Todaro	Amaurys Pérez & Veera Kinnunen	Francesca Testasecca & Stefano Oradei
10	2014	4 October – 6 December	10	15	Giusy Versace & Raimondo Todaro	Andrew Howe & Sara Di Vaira	Giulio Berruti & Samanta Togni; Giorgia Surina & Maykel Fonts (Joint third place)
11	2016	20 February – 23 April	10	13	Iago García & Samanta Togni	Michele Morrone & Ekaterina Vaganova	Rita Pavone & Simone Di Pasquale; Luca Sguazzini & Veera Kinnunen (Joint third place)
12	2017	25 February – 29 April	10	13	Oney Tapia & Veera Kinnunen	Fabio Basile & Anastasia Kuzmina	Xenya & Raimondo Todaro; Martina Stella & Samuel Peron (Joint third place)
13	2018	10 March – 19 May	10	13	Cesare Bocci & Alessandra Tripoli	Francisco Porcella & Anastasia Kuzmina	Giaro Giarratana & Lucrezia Lando; Gessica Notaro & Stefano Oradei (Joint third place)
14	2019	30 March – 31 May	10	13	Lasse Matberg & Sara Di Vaira	Ettore Bassi & Alessandra Tripoli	Milena Vukotic & Simone Di Pasquale; Dani Osvaldo & Veera Kinnunen (Joint third place)
15	2020	19 September – 21 November	10	13	Gilles Rocca & Lucrezia Lando	Paolo Conticini & Veera Kinnuen	Alessandra Mussolini & Maykel Fonts
16	2021	16 October – 18 December	10	13	Arisa & Vito Coppola	Bianca Gascoigne & Simone Di Pasquale	Morgan & Alessandra Tripoli; Sabrina Salerno & Samuel Peron (Joint third place)
17	2022	8 October – 23 December	11	13	Luisella Costamagna & Pasquale La Rocca	Alessandro Egger & Tove Villför	Ema Stokholma & Angelo Madonia
18	2023	21 October – 23 December	10	12	Wanda Nara & Pasquale La Rocca	Simona Ventura & Samuel Peron	Teo Mammucari & Anastasia Kuzmina; Lorenzo Tano & Lucrezia Lando (Joint third place)
19	2024	28 September – 21 December	12	13	Bianca Guaccero & Giovanni Pernice	Federica Pellegrini & Pasquale La Rocca	Federica Nargi & Luca Favilla
20	2025	27 September – 20 December	13	12	Andrea Delogu & Nikita Perotti	Francesca Fialdini & Giovanni Pernice	Barbara D'Urso & Pasquale La Rocca; Fabio Fognini & Giada Lini (Joint third place)
