= Ballando con le Stelle series 8 =

Ballando con le Stelle
- Season 8
- Celebrity winner: Andrés Gil
- Professional winner: Anastasia Kuzmina

Release
- Original network: RAI 1
- Original release: 7 January – 17 March 2012

Series chronology
- ← Previous; Series 7 Next → Series 9

The eighth series of Ballando con le Stelle was broadcast from 7 January 2012 to 17 March 2012 on RAI 1 and was presented by Milly Carlucci, along with Paolo Belli and his Big Band.

== Couples ==
Celebrity	Age	Occupation	Professional partner	Status
Thomas Degasperi	30	Water Skier	Natalia Maidiuk	Out; Did not enter
Stefano Campagna	49	Journalist & Weather Presenter	Natalia Maidiuk	Eliminated 1st on 7 January 2012
Ariadna Romero	25	Model & Actress	Mirko Sciolan	Eliminated 2nd on 21 January 2012
Gianni Rivera	68	Football Legend & Former MEP	Yulia Musikhina	Eliminated 3rd on 21 January 2012
Claudia Andreatti	24	Television Presenter & Miss Italia 2006	Samuel Peron	Eliminated 4th on 28 January 2012
Alex Belli	29	Actor & Model	Samanta Togni	Eliminated 5th on 11 February 2012
Sergio Assisi	39	Golden Globe Nominated Actor	Ekaterina Vaganova	Eliminated 6th on 10 March 2012
Lucrezia Lante Della Rovere	45	Film & Television Actress	Simone Di Pasquale	Sixth place on 17 March 2012
Christian Vieri	38	Former International footballer	Natalia Titova	Fifth place on 17 March 2012
Ria Antoniou	23	Model & Beauty Pageant Titleholder	Raimondo Todaro	Joint Third place on 17 March 2012
Anna Tatangelo	25	Singer & Former The X Factor Judge	Stefano Di Filippo	Joint Third place on 17 March 2012
Marco Delvecchio	38	Former International footballer	Sara Di Vaira	Second place on 17 March 2012
Andrés Gil	21	Singer & Actor	Anastasia Kuzmina	Series Winners on 17 March 2012

== Scoring chart ==
Couple	Place	1	2	3	4	5	6	7	8	9	10
Andrés & Anastasia	1	18	24+4=28	29	18	10+7=17	10+8=18	38	37	36+0+12=48	39+9=48
Marco & Sara	2	22	33+4=37	33	34	10+5=15	10+6=16	30	—	34+30+15=79	39+9=48
Anna & Stefano	3	18	30+3=33	34	36	10+8=18	0+7=7	30	—	40+5+21=66	40+9=49
Ria & Raimondo	3	12	18+2=20	19	24	10+6=16	0+6=6	31	—	32+30+18=80	27+7=34
Christian & Natalia	5	21	21+4=25	24	25	0+5=5	10+7=17	27	—	35+30+3=68	35+8=43
Lucrezia & Simone	6	30	32+3=35	24	25	0+10=10	10+6=16	29	36	28+0+9=37	30
Sergio & Ekaterina	7	26	30+4=34	21	—	WD		—	—	32+10+6=48	
Alex & Samanta	8	11	18+4=22	15	17	0+6=6	0+6=6		29		
Claudia & Samuel	9	15	21+3=24	28	19				32		
Gianni & Yulia	10	23	21+2=23	19					27		
Ariadna & Mirko	11	14	22+4=26			0+6=6			33		
Stefano & Natalia	12	12									
Thomas & Natalia	13						0+5=5		26		

Red numbers indicate the lowest score for each week.
Green numbers indicate the highest score for each week.
indicates the couple eliminated that week.
indicates the returning couples that finished in the bottom two/three was saved by a second public vote.
indicates the returning couple that finished in the bottom three/four and was saved by the judges.
indicates the couple who quit the competition.
indicates the couple was voted back into the competition.
indicates the couple was voted back into the competition but then re-eliminated.
indicates the couple passed to the next round automatically.
indicates the winning couple.
indicates the runner-up couple.
indicates the third-place couple.

=== Highest and lowest scoring performances of the series ===
The best and worst performances in each dance according to the judges' marks are as follows:

Dance	Best dancer	Best score	Worst dancer	Worst score
Boogie Woogie	Andrés Gil	38	Christian Vieri	21
Cha Cha Cha	Andrés Gil	37	Ariadna Romero	22
Charleston	Marco Delvecchio	39	Claudia Andreatti	15
Jive	Lucrezia Lante della Rovere	36	Alex Belli	15
Merengue	Lucrezia Lante della Rovere	29	Andrés Gil	18
Paso Doble	Anna Tatangelo	40	Alex Belli	11
Quickstep	Marco Delvecchio	34	Gianni Rivera	23
Rumba	Andrés Gil	39	Alex Belli	17
Salsa	Anna Tatangelo; Lucrezia Lante della Rovere	30	Ria Antoniou	12
Samba	Anna Tatangelo	40	Stefano Campagna	12
Tango	Anna Tatangelo	36	Alex Belli	18
Waltz	Claudia Andreatti	32	Andrés Gil	18

== Average chart ==
Rank by average	Place	Couple	Total	Number of dances	Average
1	=3	Anna & Stefano	228	7	32.6
2	2	Marco & Sara	225	7	32.1
3	1	Andrés & Anastasia	239	8	29.9
4	6	Lucrezia & Simone	234	8	29.3
5	7	Sergio & Ekaterina	109	4	27.3
6	5	Christian & Natalia	188	7	26.9
7	13	Thomas & Natalia	26	1	26.0
8	=3	Ria & Raimondo	163	7	23.3
9	9	Claudia & Samuel	115	5	23.0
9	11	Ariadna & Mirko	69	3	23.0
11	10	Gianni & Yulia	90	4	22.5
12	8	Alex & Samanta	90	5	18.0
13	12	Stefano & Natalia	12	1	12.0

== Average dance chart ==
Couples	Averages	Best Dances	Worst Dances
Andrés & Anastasia	29.9	Rumba (39)	Merengue & Waltz (18)
Marco & Sara	32.1	Charleston (39)	Samba (22)
Anna & Stefano	32.6	Samba & Paso Doble (40)	Jive (18)
Ria & Raimondo	23.3	Quickstep (32)	Salsa (12)
Christian & Natalia	26.9	Samba & Rumba (35)	Boogie Woogie & Salsa (21)
Lucrezia & Simone	29.3	Jive (36)	Salsa (24)
Sergio & Ekaterina	27.3	Boogie Woogie (32)	Rumba (21)
Alex & Samanta	18.0	Charleston (29)	Paso Doble (11)
Claudia & Samuel	23.0	Waltz (32)	Charleston (15)
Gianni & Yulia	22.5	Tango (27)	Waltz (19)
Ariadna & Mirko	23.0	Tango (33)	Salsa (14)
Stefano & Natalia	12.0	Samba (12)	Samba (12)
Thomas & Natalia	26.0	Cha-Cha-Cha (26)	Cha-Cha-Cha (26)

== Special guest ==
Individual judges scores in charts below (given in parentheses) are listed in this order from left to right: Ivan Zazzaroni, Fabio Canino, Carolyn Smith and Guillermo Mariotto.

Week	Couple	Score	Dance	Music
1	Oscar Pistorius & Annalisa Longo	40 (10,10,10,10)	Tango	"The Winner Takes It All – ABBA
2	Giancarlo Fisichella & Annalisa Longo	32 (8,8,8,8)	Boogie Woogie	"Andavo a 100 all'ora" – Gianni Morandi
3	Laura Natalia Esquivel & Ferdinando Iannaccone	40 (10,10,10,10)	Salsa	"No me ames" – Jennifer Lopez, Marc Anthony
4	Stefania Sandrelli & Roberto Imperatori	40 (10,10,10,10)	Tango	
5	Claudia Gerini & Roberto Imperatori	40 (10,10,10,10)	Paso Doble	
6	Max Giusti & Vicky Martin	29 (5,9,5,10)	Tango	
7	Nino Frassica & Annalisa Longo	38 (10,9,10,9)	Cha-Cha-Cha	"Sì, la vita è tutta un quiz" – Renzo Arbore
8	Loredana Bertè & Roo Imperatori; Gigi D'Alessio & Annalisa Longo	40 (10,10,10,10); 40 (10,10,10,10)	Tango; Waltz	
9	Emma Marrone & Roberto Imperatori	40 (10,10,10,10)	Tango	

== Dance order ==
=== Week 1 ===
Individual judges scores in charts below (given in parentheses) are listed in this order from left to right: Ivan Zazzaroni, Fabio Canino, Carolyn Smith and Guillermo Mariotto.

Couple	Score	Dance	Music
Anna & Stefano	18 (5,5,4,4)	Jive	"Mamma Mia" – ABBA
Stefano & Natalia	12 (3,4,3,2)	Samba	
Claudia & Samuel	15 (4,4,4,3)	Charleston	"Sing, Sing, Sing (With a Swing)" – Louis Prima
Sergio & Ekaterina	26 (6,6,6,8)	Tango	
Ariadna & Mirko	14 (4,4,3,3)	Salsa	"Baila morena" – Zucchero
Marco & Sara	22 (6,6,5,5)	Samba	"L'ombelico del mondo" – Jovanotti
Lucrezia & Simone	30 (7,7,8,8)	Tango	"Acqua e sale" – Adriano Celentano, Mina
Alex & Samanta	11 (4,4,3,0)	Paso Doble	"Domani" – L'Aura
Gianni & Yulia	23 (6,6,6,5)	Quickstep	"Fly Me to the Moon" – Nat King Cole
Ria & Raimondo	12 (3,4,3,2)	Salsa	"Diamonds Are a Girl's Best Friend" – Marilyn Monroe
Christian & Natalia	21 (6,5,6,4)	Boogie Woogie	"Everybody Needs Somebody to Love" – The Blues Brothers
Andrés & Anastasia	18 (5,5,4,4)	Merengue	"Il più grande spettacolo dopo il Big Bang" – Jovanotti

=== Week 2 ===
Individual judges scores in charts below (given in parentheses) are listed in this order from left to right: Ivan Zazzaroni, Fabio Canino, Carolyn Smith and Guillermo Mariotto.

Couple	Score	Dance	Music
Claudia & Samuel	21 (5,5,4,7)	Jive	"Vedo nero" – Zucchero
Sergio & Ekaterina	30 (6,7,9,8)	Paso Doble	"Nata per me" – Adriano Celentano
Anna & Stefano	30 (7,6,7,10)	Salsa	"Let's Get Loud" – Jennifer Lopez
Alex & Samanta	18 (5,5,5,3)	Tango	"Fino alla fine del mondo" – Gianni Morandi
Ariadna & Mirko	22 (5,6,6,5)	Cha-Cha-Cha	"Poker Face" – Lady Gaga
Gianni & Yulia	21 (5,5,6,5)	Charleston	"Che bambola!" – Fred Buscaglione
Lucrezia & Simone	32 (7,8,9,8)	Paso Doble	"La musica continuerà per sempre" – Kraftwerk
Marco & Sara	33 (8,8,9,8)	Boogie Woogie	"Il Gatto e la Volpe" – Edoardo Bennato
Andrés & Anastasia	24 (6,6,6,6)	Samba	"Fuori dal tunnel" – Caparezza
Ria & Raimondo	18 (4,5,5,4)	Jive	"Candyman" – Christina Aguilera
Christian & Natalia	21 (5,6,6,4)	Salsa	"Thriller" – Michael Jackson

=== Week 3 ===
Individual judges scores in charts below (given in parentheses) are listed in this order from left to right: Ivan Zazzaroni, Fabio Canino, Carolyn Smith and Guillermo Mariotto.

Couple	Score	Dance	Music
Lucrezia & Simone	24 (7,6,4,7)	Salsa	"Giorni nuovi" – Alberto Fortis
Gianni & Yulia	19 (6,7,3,3)	Waltz	"We Are the Champions" – Queen
Sergio & Ekaterina	21 (6,6,4,5)	Rumba	"Se qui" – Toto Cutugno
Andrés & Anastasia	29 (7,8,6,8)	Jive	"Oh Happy Day" – Lauryn Hill
Claudia & Samuel	28 (8,8,5,7)	Tango	"Mi sono innamorato di te" – Luigi Tenco
Marco & Sara	33 (9,9,7,8)	Paso Doble	"Le nozze di Nore" – Jovanotti
Ria & Raimondo	19 (5,7,3,4)	Rumba	"I Wanna Be Loved by You" – Marilyn Monroe
Christian & Natalia	24 (8,7,4,5)	Tango	"El Tango de Roxanne" – Moulin Rouge!
Alex & Samanta	15 (5,4,2,4)	Jive	"Great Balls of Fire" – Jerry Lee Lewis
Anna & Stefano	34 (10,9,7,8)	Cha-Cha-Cha	"Into the Groove" – Madonna

=== Week 4 ===
Individual judges scores in charts below (given in parentheses) are listed in this order from left to right: Ivan Zazzaroni, Fabio Canino, Carolyn Smith and Guillermo Mariotto.

Couple	Score	Dance	Music
Claudia & Samuel	19 (5,6,4,4)	Paso Doble	"She Bangs" – Ricky Martin
Anna & Stefano	36 (9,9,8,10)	Tango	"Libertango" – Ástor Piazzolla
Andrés & Anastasia	18 (5,6,3,4)	Waltz	
Marco & Sara	34 (8,9,9,8)	Quickstep	"When The Saints Go Marching In" – Louis Armstrong
Ria & Raimondo	24 (6,8,4,6)	Waltz	"A New Day Has Come" – Celine Dion
Alex & Samanta	17 (5,6,4,2)	Rumba	"The Look of Love" – Diana Krall
Sergio & Ekaterina	N/A	Waltz	"Moon River" – Louis Armstrong
Lucrezia & Simone	25 (6,6,6,7)	Charleston	"Life Is a Cabaret" – Liza Minnelli
Christian & Natalia	25 (7,7,6,5)	Jive	"Tutti Frutti" – Little Richard

=== Week 5 ===
Couple	Winner	Dance	Music
Alex & Samanta	Marco & Sara	Samba	"Bello e impossibile" – Gianna Nannini
Marco & Sara	Marco & Sara	Jive	"You're the One That I Want" – John Travolta, Olivia Newton-John
Andrés & Anastasia	Andrés & Anastasia	Quickstep	"Calma e sangue freddo" – Luca Dirisio
Christian & Natalia	Andrés & Anastasia	Paso Doble	"Eye of the Tiger" – Survivor
Ria & Raimondo	Ria & Raimondo	Tango	
Lucrezia & Simone	Ria & Raimondo	Waltz	"Unchained Melody" – The Righteous Brothers
Anna & Stefano	Anna & Stefano	Boogie Woogie	"Over the Rainbow" – Judy Garland
Ariadna & Mirko	Anna & Stefano	Rumba	"Killing Me Softly" – Roberta Flack

=== Week 6 ===
Couple	Winner	Dance	Music
Alex & Samanta	Christian & Natalia	Salsa	"Cercami" – Renato Zero
Christian & Natalia	Christian & Natalia	Quickstep	"Il tuo bacio è come il rock" – Adriano Celentano
Andrés & Anastasia	Andrés & Anastasia	Tango	"Questo piccolo grande amore" – Claudio Baglioni
Ria & Raimondo	Andrés & Anastasia	Cha-Cha-Cha	"Like a Virgin" – Madonna
Anna & Stefano	Marco & Sara	Rumba	"E non finisce mica il cielo" – Mia Martini
Marco & Sara	Marco & Sara	Waltz	"I migliori anni della nostra vita" – Renato Zero
Lucrezia & Simone	Lucrezia & Simone	Samba	"La voglia, la pazzia" – Ornella Vanoni
Thomas & Natalia	Lucrezia & Simone	Jive	"Surfin' U.S.A." – The Beach Boys

=== Week 7 ===
Individual judges scores in charts below (given in parentheses) are listed in this order from left to right: Ivan Zazzaroni, Fabio Canino, Carolyn Smith and Guillermo Mariotto.

Couple	Score	Dance	Music
Anna & Stefano	30 (8,7,7,8)	Quickstep	"You Can't Hurry Love" – The Supremes
Marco & Sara	30 (7,9,8,6)	Tango	
Lucrezia & Simone	29 (7,7,6,9)	Merengue	"Con le mani" – Zucchero
Christian & Natalia	27 (7,7,7,6)	Waltz	"Smile" – Charlie Chaplin
Ria & Raimondo	31 (7,9,7,8)	Samba	"Sex Bomb" – Tom Jones
Andrés & Anastasia	38 (8,10,10,10)	Boogie Woogie	"L'amore è una cosa meravigliosa" – Neil Sedaka

=== Week 8 ===
Individual judges scores in charts below (given in parentheses) are listed in this order from left to right: Ivan Zazzaroni, Fabio Canino, Carolyn Smith and Guillermo Mariotto.

Couple	Score	Dance	Music
Alex & Samanta	29 (7,7,7,8)	Charleston	
Claudia & Samuel	32 (8,8,8,8)	Waltz	
Gianni & Yulia	27 (7,7,7,6)	Tango	"Luci a San Siro" – Roo Vecchioni
Thomas & Natalia	26 (7,5,7,7)	Cha-Cha-Cha	"Billie Jean" – Michael Jackson
Ariadna & Mirko	33 (8,9,8,8)	Tango	
Andrés & Anastasia	37 (9,9,9,10)	Cha-Cha-Cha	"Ragazzo fortunato" – Jovanotti
Lucrezia & Simone	36 (8,9,9,10)	Jive	

=== Week 9 ===
Individual judges scores in charts below (given in parentheses) are listed in this order from left to right: Ivan Zazzaroni, Fabio Canino, Carolyn Smith and Guillermo Mariotto.

Couple	Score	Dance	Music
Lucrezia & Simone	28 (7,7,6,8)	Boogie Woogie	
Anna & Stefano	40 (10,10,10,10)	Samba	"I Will Survive" – Gloria Gaynor
Marco & Sara	34 (8,9,9,8)	Rumba	
Ria & Raimondo	32 (8,8,8,8)	Quickstep	"L-O-V-E" – Nat King Cole
Sergio & Ekaterina	32 (8,8,8,8)	Boogie Woogie	"Tu vuò fà l'americano" – Renato Carosone
Christian & Natalia	35 (9,9,9,8)	Samba	"Help!" – The Beatles
Andrés & Anastasia	36 (9,10,9,8)	Paso Doble	"Albachiara" – Vasco Rossi

=== Week 10 ===
Individual judges scores in charts below (given in parentheses) are listed in this order from left to right: Ivan Zazzaroni, Fabio Canino, Carolyn Smith and Guillermo Mariotto.

Couple	Score	Dance	Music
Ria & Raimondo	27 (7,7,6,7)	Paso Doble	"La bambola" – Patty Pravo
Christian & Natalia	35 (9,9,9,8)	Rumba	
Marco & Sara	39 (10,10,10,9)	Charleston	"Puttin on the Ritz" – Irving Berlin
Lucrezia & Simone	30 (7,8,7,8)	Salsa	
Andrés & Anastasia	39 (9,10,10,10)	Rumba	"Non me lo so spiegare" – Tiziano Ferro
Anna & Stefano	40 (10,10,10,10)	Paso Doble	"I giardini di marzo" – Lucio Battisti

== Bottom 3/4 ==
=== Week 1 ===
	Couple	First Dance	Dance-off Dance	% Votes
Saved by judges	Ariadna & Mirko	Salsa (14)	Samba	Safe
Saved by public	Claudia & Samuel	Charleston (15)	Merengue	66%
Eliminated	Stefano & Natalia	Samba (12)	Cha-Cha-Cha	34%

=== Week 2 ===
	Couple	First Dance	Dance-off Dance	% Votes
Saved by judges	Gianni & Yulia	Charleston (21)	Salsa	Safe
Saved by public	Alex & Samanta	Tango (18)	Merengue	73%
Eliminated	Ariadna & Mirko	Cha-Cha-Cha (22)	Merengue	27%

=== Week 3 ===
	Couple	First Dance	Dance-off Dance	% Votes
Saved by judges	Lucrezia & Simone	Salsa (24)	Rumba	N/A
Saved by public	Claudia & Samuel	Tango (28)	Salsa	75%
Eliminated	Gianni & Yulia	Waltz (19)	Jive	25%

=== Week 4 ===
	Couple	First Dance	Dance-off Dance	% Votes
Saved by judges	Marco & Sara	Quickstep (34)	Cha-Cha-Cha	N/A
Saved by public	Lucrezia & Simone	Charleston (25)	Cha-Cha-Cha	69%
Eliminated	Claudia & Samuel	Paso Doble (19)	Quickstep	31%

=== Week 5 ===
	Couple	First Dance	Dance-off Dance	% Votes
Saved by judges	Christian & Natalia	Paso Doble (0)	Cha-Cha-Cha	N/A
Saved by public	Alex & Samanta	Samba (0)	Boogie Woogie	64%
Eliminated	Ariadna & Mirko	Rumba (0)	Jive	36%

=== Week 6 ===
	Couple	First Dance	Dance-off Dance	% Votes
Saved by judges	Marco & Sara	Waltz (10)	Merengue	N/A
Saved by public	Ria & Raimondo	Cha-Cha-Cha (0)	Merengue	41%
Eliminated	Alex & Samanta	Salsa (0)	Waltz	28%
Eliminated	Thomas & Natalia	Jive (0)	Salsa	31%

=== Week 7 ===
	Couple	First Dance	Dance-off Dance	% Votes
Saved by judges	Anna & Stefano	Quickstep (30)	Tango	N/A
Saved by public	Marco & Sara	Tango (30)	Tango	?/55%
Eliminated	Andrés & Anastasia	Boogie Woogie (38)	Tango	31%
Eliminated	Lucrezia & Simone	Merengue (29)	Tango	?/45%

=== Week 9 ===
	Couple	First Dance	Dance-off Dance	% Votes
Saved by judges	Marco & Sara	Rumba (34)	Apache	N/A
Saved by public	Andrés & Anastasia	Paso Doble (36)	Apache	75%
Eliminated	Sergio & Ekaterina	Boogie Woogie (32)	Apache	25%

== Call-out order ==
The table below lists the order in which the contestants' fates were revealed. The order of the safe couples doesn't reflect the viewer voting results.

Order	1	2	3	4	5	6	7	8	9	10			
1	Sergio & Ekaterina	Sergio & Ekaterina	Marco & Sara	Sergio & Ekaterina	Sergio & Ekaterina	Lucrezia & Simone	Sergio & Ekaterina	Anna & Stefano	Ria & Raimondo	Marco & Sara	Andrés & Anastasia	Marco & Sara	Andrés & Anastasia
2	Lucrezia & Simone	Marco & Sara	Sergio & Ekaterina	Anna & Stefano	Andrés & Anastasia	Andrés & Anastasia	Ria & Raimondo	Christian & Natalia	Anna & Stefano	Anna & Stefano	Anna & Stefano	Andrés & Anastasia	Marco & Sara
3	Marco & Sara	Anna & Stefano	Anna & Stefano	Christian & Natalia	Anna & Stefano	Christian & Natalia	Christian & Natalia	Ria & Raimondo	Christian & Natalia	Andrés & Anastasia	Ria & Raimondo	Anna & Stefano	
4	Andrés & Anastasia	Lucrezia & Simone	Andrés & Anastasia	Alex & Samanta	Lucrezia & Simone	Anna & Stefano	Anna & Stefano	Sergio & Ekaterina	Lucrezia & Simone	Ria & Raimondo	Marco & Sara	Ria & Raimondo	
5	Alex & Samanta	Andrés & Anastasia	Christian & Natalia	Ria & Raimondo	Marco & Sara	Marco & Sara	Marco & Sara	Marco & Sara	Marco & Sara	Christian & Natalia	Christian & Natalia		
6	Gianni & Yulia	Claudia & Samuel	Alex & Samanta	Andrés & Anastasia	Ria & Raimondo	Ria & Raimondo	Lucrezia & Simone	Andrés & Anastasia	Andrés & Anastasia	Lucrezia & Simone			
7	Ria & Raimondo	Christian & Natalia	Ria & Raimondo	Marco & Sara	Christian & Natalia	Alex & Samanta	Andrés & Anastasia	Lucrezia & Simone	Sergio & Ekaterina				
8	Anna & Stefano	Ria & Raimondo	Lucrezia & Simone	Lucrezia & Simone	Alex & Samanta	Thomas & Natalia							
9	Christian & Natalia	Gianni & Yulia	Claudia & Samuel	Claudia & Samuel	Ariadna & Mirko								
10	Ariadna & Mirko	Alex & Samanta	Gianni & Yulia										
11	Claudia & Samuel	Ariadna & Mirko											
12	Stefano & Natalia												

This couple came in first place with the judges.
This couple came in last place with the judges.
This couple came in last place with the judges and was eliminated.
This couple came in first place with the judges and was eliminated.
This couple was eliminated.
This couple was voted back into the competition.
This couple was voted back into the competition but then re-eliminated.
This couple passed to the next round automatically.
This couple won the competition.
This couple came second in the competition.
This couple came third in the competition.

== Dance chart ==
Couple	1	2	3	4	5	6	7	8	9	10
Andrés & Anastasia	Merengue	Samba	Jive	Waltz	Quickstep	Tango	Boogie Woogie	Cha-Cha-Cha	Paso Doble	Rumba
Marco & Sara	Samba	Boogie Woogie	Paso Doble	Quickstep	Jive	Waltz	Tango	Marathon	Rumba	Charleston
Anna & Stefano	Jive	Salsa	Cha-Cha-Cha	Tango	Boogie Woogie	Rumba	Quickstep	Marathon	Samba	Paso Doble
Ria & Raimondo	Salsa	Jive	Rumba	Waltz	Tango	Cha-Cha-Cha	Samba	Marathon	Quickstep	Paso Doble
Christian & Natalia	Boogie Woogie	Salsa	Tango	Jive	Paso Doble	Quickstep	Waltz	Marathon	Samba	Rumba
Lucrezia & Simone	Tango	Paso Doble	Salsa	Charleston	Waltz	Samba	Merengue	Jive	Boogie Woogie	Salsa
Sergio & Ekaterina	Tango	Paso Doble	Rumba	Waltz	—		Waltz	Marathon	Boogie Woogie	
Alex & Samanta	Paso Doble	Tango	Jive	Rumba	Samba	Salsa		Charleston		
Claudia & Samuel	Charleston	Jive	Tango	Paso Doble	Salsa	Salsa	Jive	Waltz		
Gianni & Yulia	Quickstep	Charleston	Waltz		Jive	Waltz	Quickstep	Tango		
Ariadna & Mirko	Salsa	Cha-Cha-Cha			Rumba	Samba	Cha-Cha-Cha	Tango		
Stefano & Natalia	Samba									
Thomas & Natalia						Jive	Salsa	Cha-Cha-Cha		

Highest Scoring Dance
Lowest Scoring Dance
