= Anastasia Kuzmina =

Ukrainian dancer and media personality (born 1993)

- Born: 21 March 1993 (age 32); Kyiv, Ukraine
- Occupations: Dancer; actress; television personality
- Years active: 2001–present
- Relatives: Nikita Kuzmin (brother)

Anastasia Kuzmina (born 21 March 1993 in Kyiv) is a Ukrainian dancer and media personality.

== Biography ==
A professional dancer since 2001, Kuzmina is best known for her participation with model and actor Andrés Gil in three Italian reality shows. In January 2012, the Argentinian media personality Gil took part (with Bobo Vieri, Alex Belli, Anna Tatangelo, Ria Antoniou, Ariadna Romero and other contestants) in the eighth series of the Italian reality show Ballando con le Stelle hosted on Rai 1 by Milly Carlucci with Paolo Belli and his Big Band. In that series, the couple Gil-Kuzmina won the first place; they won, in April 2012, the third place in the contest of champions, named Ballando con te, against some past champions of the past editions of Ballando con le Stelle. In September 2012, Kuzmina and Gil took part in the first season, aired on Rai 2 with Emanuele Filiberto di Savoia as host, of Pechino Express, the Italian version of the international reality show Peking Express. In October 2014 Kuzmina took part in the tenth season of Ballando con le Stelle with Tony Colombo. In March 2019 Kuzmina became the host (with Lorenzo Branchetti) of Happy Dance, a children's dance program aired by Rai Gulp. In February 2021 Kuzmina started a stage with PMI in Switzerland.

== Filmography ==
=== Television ===
Year	Title	Role	Notes
2012–present	Ballando con le Stelle	Herself/Dancer	Talent show (seasons 8–present)
2012	Pechino Express	Herself/ Contestant	Reality show (season 1)
2013–2014	Anastasia Love Dance	Anastasia	Acting debut, lead role (12 episodes)
2017	Ballando on the Road	Herself/Dancer	Talent show (season 1)
2017	Dance Battle	Herself/Dancer	Videoclip
2019	Happy Dance	Herself/host	Children's dance program
