= Ekaterina Vaganova =

Russian dancer (born 1988)

- Born: January 9, 1988; Vilyuchinsk (Kamchatka), Russia
- Occupations: Ballroom, Latin American dancer and coach
- Website: www.vaganova.info

Ekaterina Vaganova (born January 9, 1988; Russian: Екатерина Юрьевна Ваганова) is a Russian dancer. She is the World champion on the Ballroom and Latin American dances. She was two-time Champion of Russia, four-time Champion of Italy, two-time vice-champion of the World in Youth Latin, IDSF, finalist of the World and European championships in IDSF, champion of the World 2009 in IDSA and IDU versions and champion of the Europe WDC Latin 2009.

== Biography ==
Vaganova began dancing when she was two and a half years old, in the dance school in the town of Vilyuchinsk, Kamchatka, Russia. At the age of six, she started ballroom dancing. When she was 11 years old, her family moved to Moscow.

Two years later, when dancing with Alexander Ermachenkov, Vaganova became a World Champion in juniors in the program of ten dances. Ekaterina and Alexander were awarded the Exercise Prize in 2001 for their contribution of the development of dance sports in Russia.

From 2004 to 2006, Vaganova danced with Gabriel Goffredo and represented Italy. Vaganova and Goffredo were two time vice-champions of the world in youth Latin.

From 2006 to 2008 Ekaterina Vaganova performed with Andrea De Angelis. After dancing together for six months, they came fourth at the World and European Championships-2007 in the program of 10 dances. They were also finalists in the International Championship Under 21, the Dutch Open Champions 2006 Under 21, and came seventh in the Blackpool Dance Festival Under 21 Latin.

In March 2009 Ekaterina participated in the TV program "Dancing with the Stars" in Russia in couple with Kirill Pletnev and Yuri Askarov.

In addition to sports performances, Ekaterina teaches dance in Russia, Italy, Spain, Austria and Ukraine. Many of her students became champions of the national championships, World Championship finalists and finalists of the Blackpool Dance Festival.

Ekaterina speaks Italian, Spanish, English and Russian. Her hobbies include classical music, ballet, theater and literature about art.

On February 12, 2015, she and Russian ballet dancer Artem Yachmennikov were married.

It's impossible to be always on top. Success means maximum quantity of returnings. [...] Never give up and believe in yourself! Good luck!

— Ekaterina Vaganova
