= Simone Di Pasquale =

Italian dancer

Simone Di Pasquale (Rome, 27 February 1978) is an Italian dancer, television personality, and dance teacher.

== Biography ==
His artistic training began with dance sport.

From 2000 to 2008, paired with the ballerina Natalia Titova, he successfully participated in numerous competitions. In 2004, the couple took:

- fifth place in the competition World Master of Innsbruck
- third place in the competition Rising Stars of Blackpool
- first place in the competition Rising Stars UK.

In 2005 he started to appear in the TV show Dancing With The Stars, conducted by Milly Carlucci and broadcast on Saturday evening on RAI 1. He won the first edition paired with Hoara Borselli and continued to participate from 2006 to 2014.

Between 2006 and 2009, he was a guest on several television programs of RAI 1:

- Il treno dei desideri;
- Miss Italia, as an arbiter and the protagonist of the institutional spot for the promotion of the territory;
- Miss Italy in the World, in the role of principal dancer;
- Don Matteo, sixth edition, in the role of co-star in an episode of the series

Simone also performed on Italy’s most famous stage, participating in renowned shows:

- Between 2006 and 2008, starring in the role of Tony Manero in the national tour of Saturday Night Fever, directed by Massimo Romeo Piparo
- In 2008, in the role of Link Larkin in the musical Hairspray - Fat is Beautiful!, directed by Massimo Romeo Piparo, which was performed in several Italian cities including Rome, Milan, Florence, Verona, Bologna, Naples, and Catania.

After dancing for many years, Simone launched a teaching activity to transfer to the younger generation's passion and professionalism.

In 2000, he opened his dance school Klassic Dance Studio in Eome, which in 2008 became Star Dance Academy. In 2011, Simone founded the company Twister Entertainment Srl, which he currently holds. The company deals with the organization of events and initiatives aimed at dance and entertainment, addressed both at public events and for private and business events.

In 2012, Simone started a training program, Latin Up – a combination of Latin American dance steps with an aerobic workout – and the Latin American dance class founded on the formula Personal Dancer. The course includes individual lessons taught by teachers and dancer competitors with students of all ages and levels, associated with group lessons aimed at deepening the technique and practice.

In July 2013, he presented the final of the European Championship of Tango at the Capitol Club of Rome, with the show Galatango, broadcast on RAI 1.

In July 2014, he participated with Milly Carlucci and other dancers from Dancing with the Stars in the Canadian tour Dances with Milly.

== Private life ==
Simone Di Pasquale currently lives with Maria Di Stolfo and has one son. He's an atheist.

== Television ==
Year	Title	Role	Notes
2005–present	Ballando con le stelle	Himself/ Dancer	Winner with Hoara Borselli (season 1)
2007	Miss Italia	Himself/ Judge	Annual beauty contest
2009	Don Matteo	Victor Suarez	Guest role; episode: "Tango"
2017	Ballando on the Road	Himself/ Guest	Season 1
2021	Il cantante mascherato	Himself/ Co-host	Season 2
2022	Il cantante mascherato	Himself/ Contestant	Season 3
