= Ballando con le Stelle series 7 =

Season of television series

Ballando con le Stelle
- Season 7
- Celebrity winner: Kaspar Capparoni
- Professional winner: Yulia Musikhina

Release
- Original network: RAI 1
- Original release: 26 February – 30 April 2011

Series chronology
- Next → Series 8

The seventh series of Ballando con le Stelle was broadcast from 26 February to 30 April 2011 on RAI 1 and was presented by Milly Carlucci with Paolo Belli and his 'Big Band'.

== Couples ==
Celebrity	Age	Occupation	Professional partner	Status
Alessandro Di Pietro	65	Writer & TV Presenter	Annalisa Longo	Eliminated 1st on 26 February 2011
Alessia Filippi	23	Olympic Silver Medalist Swimmer	Raimondo Todaro	Eliminated 2nd on 5 March 2011
Giuseppe Povia	38	Singer	Nuria Santalucia	Eliminated 3rd on 12 March 2011
Mădălina Diana Ghenea	23	Model	Simone Di Pasquale	Eliminated 4th on 19 March 2011
Paolo Rossi	54	International Football Legend	Vicky Martin	Eliminated 5th on 2 April 2011
Barbara Capponi	43	Journalist & Newsreader	Samuel Peron	Eliminated 6th on 23 April 2011
Gedeon Burkhard	41	Il Commissario Rex Actor	Samanta Togni	Sixth Place on 30 April 2011
Christian Panucci	37	Former International Footballer	Agnese Junkure	Fifth Place on 30 April 2011
Vittoria Belvedere	39	Television Actress	Stefano Di Filippo	Joint Third Place on 30 April 2011
Bruno Cabrerizo	31	Model	Ola Karieva	Joint Third Place on 30 April 2011
Sara Santostasi	18	Actress & Singer	Umberto Gaudino	Second Place on 30 April 2011
Kaspar Capparoni	46	Il Commissario Rex Actor	Yulia Musikhina	Series Winners on 30 April 2011

== Scoring Chart ==
Couple	Place	1	2	3	4	5	6	7	8	9	6+9	10
Kaspar & Yulia	1	32	36	38+5=43	32+0=32	38+15=53	44+6=50	45+30=75	—	43+8=51	101	35+8=43
Sara & Umberto	2	29	33	48+10=58	39+10=49	40+10=50	41+7=48	41+25=66	—	34+10=44	92	35+10=45
Bruno & Ola	3	11	31	31+5=36	25+0=25	26+10=36	25+6=31	34+0=34	39	37+8=45	76	38+8=46
Vittoria & Stefano	3	25	33	41+10=51	38+5=43	35+15=50	35+2=37	—	—	45+39=84	121	40+8=48
Christian & Agnese	5	21	30	35+5=40	24+15=39	30+10=40	30+5=35	31+0=31	29	33+8=41	76	30+7=37
Gedeon & Samanta	6	27	0	33+5=38	29+0=29	31+15=46	39+2=41	41+30=71	—	44+7=51	92	29
Barbara & Samuel	7	22	22	27+5=32	30+0=30	27+15=42	36-3=33	32+5=37	—	28+6=34	67	
Paolo & Vicky	8	20	25	34+5=39	25+15=40	21+10=31			42			
Madalina & Simone	9	19	25	33+0=33	32+0=32	—	—		37			
Giuseppe & Nuria	10	16	20	26+0=26					37			
Alessia & Raimondo	11	13	19						29			
Alessandro & Annalisa	12	9							26			

Red numbers indicate the lowest score for each week.
Green numbers indicate the highest score for each week.
indicates the couple eliminated that week.
indicates the returning couples that finished in the bottom two/three was saved by a second public vote.
indicates the returning couple that finished in the bottom three/four and was saved by the judges.
indicates the couple was voted back into the competition.
indicates the couple was voted back into the competition but then re-eliminated.
indicates the couple passed to the next round automatically.
indicates the winning couple.
indicates the runner-up couple.
indicates the third-place couple.

=== Highest and lowest scoring performances of the series ===
The best and worst performances in each dance according to the judges' marks are as follows:

Dance	Best dancer	Best score	Worst dancer	Worst score
Boogie Woogie	Kaspar Capparoni	44	Barbara Capponi	27
Cha Cha Cha	Kaspar Capparoni	45	Paolo Rossi	21
Charleston	Kaspar Capparoni	43	Giuseppe Povia	26
Colombian Salsa	Bruno Cabrerizo	37	Bruno Cabrerizo	37
Jive	Bruno Cabrerizo	48	Alessia Filippi	19
Merengue	Gedeon Burkhard	36	Paolo Rossi	25
Paso Doble	Christian Panucci	38	Gedeon Burkhard	0
Quickstep	Kaspar Capparoni	44	Alessandro Di Pietro	9
Rumba	Vittoria Belvedere	45	Bruno Cabrerizo	26
Salsa	Sara Santostasi	48	Giuseppe Povia	16
Samba	Gedeon Burkhard	39	Giuseppe Povia	20
Tango	Sara Santostasi	40	Gedeon Burkhard	27
Waltz	Vittoria Belvedere	50	Bruno Cabrerizo	25

== Average Chart ==
- Bonus points are not included

Rank by average	Place	Couple	Total	Number of dances	Average
1	1	Kaspar & Yulia	351.75	9	39.1
2	2	Sara & Umberto	348.75	9	38.8
3	=3	Vittoria & Stefano	302	8	37.8
4	6	Gedeon & Samanta	280.25	9	31.1
5	5	Christian & Agnese	271.5	9	30.2
6	=3	Bruno & Ola	269.5	9	29.9
7	7	Barbara & Samuel	224	8	28.0
8	9	Madalina & Simone	109	4	27.3
9	8	Paolo & Vicky	125	5	25.0
10	10	Giuseppe & Nuria	62	3	20.8
11	11	Alessia & Raimondo	32	2	16.0
12	12	Alessandro & Annalisa	9	1	9.0

== Average Dance Chart ==
Couples	Averages	Best Dances	Worst Dances
Kaspar & Yulia	39.1	Cha-Cha-Cha (45)	Rumba & Paso Doble (32)
Sara & Umberto	38.8	Salsa (48)	Samba (29)
Bruno & Ola	29.9	Jive (48)	Paso Doble (11)
Vittoria & Stefano	37.8	Waltz (50)	Jive (25)
Christian & Agnese	30.2	Paso Doble (38)	Paso Doble (21)
Gedeon & Samanta	31.1	Waltz (44)	Paso Doble (0)
Barbara & Samuel	28.0	Tango (36)	Cha-Cha-Cha & Salsa (22)
Paolo & Vicky	25.0	Charleston (34)	Jive (20)
Madalina & Simone	27.3	Cha-Cha-Cha (33)	Salsa (19)
Giuseppe & Nuria	20.7	Charleston (26)	Salsa (16)
Alessia & Raimondo	16.0	Jive (19)	Quickstep (13)
Alessandro & Annalisa	9.0	Quickstep (9)	Quickstep (9)

== Dance order ==
=== Week 1 ===
Individual judges scores in charts below (given in parentheses) are listed in this order from left to right: Ivan Zazzaroni, Fabio Canino, Carolyn Smith, Lamberto Sposini and Guillermo Mariotto.

Running order

Couple	Score	Dance
Vittoria & Stefano	25 (5,5,4,5,6)	Jive
Bruno & Ola	11 (2,2,4,3,0)	Paso Doble
Alessandro & Annalisa	9 (2,4,0,2,1)	Quickstep
Giuseppe & Nuria	16 (3,4,2,4,3)	Salsa
Gedeon & Samanta	27 (5,5,4,6,7)	Tango
Alessia & Raimondo	13 (4,4,0,3,2)	Quickstep
Kaspar & Yulia	32 (7,6,5,7,7)	Rumba
Madalina & Simone	19 (5,4,2,5,3)	Salsa
Christian & Agnese	21 (4,5,3,5,4)	Paso Doble
Barbara & Samuel	22 (4,4,3,4,7)	Cha-Cha-Cha
Paolo & Vicky	20 (5,4,3,4,4)	Jive
Sara & Umberto	29 (6,6,5,6,6)	Samba
Couple	Results	Dance-off Dance
Christian & Agnese	Saved	Salsa
Bruno & Ola	Not saved	Merengue
Alessia & Raimondo	Not saved	Paso Doble
Alessandro & Annalisa	Not Saved	Samba
Couple	Results	First dance reproposed
Bruno & Ola	45%	Paso Doble
Alessia & Raimondo	41%	Quickstep
Alessandro & Annalisa	14%	Quickstep

=== Week 2 ===
Individual judges scores in charts below (given in parentheses) are listed in this order from left to right: Ivan Zazzaroni, Fabio Canino, Carolyn Smith, Lamberto Sposini and Guillermo Mariotto.

Running order

Couple	Score	Dance
Giuseppe & Nuria	20 (4,4,3,5,4)	Samba
Vittoria & Stefano	33 (7,6,6,7,7)	Paso Doble
Bruno & Ola	31 (8,6,5,5,7)	Salsa
Barbara & Samuel	22 (5,4,4,5,4)	Salsa
Kaspar & Yulia	36 (7,7,7,7,8)	Tango
Alessia & Raimondo	19 (4,4,2,4,5)	Jive
Gedeon & Samanta	0 (0,0,0,0,0)	Paso Doble
Sara & Umberto	33 (5,7,7,6,8)	Merengue
Madalina & Simone	25 (5,5,4,5,6)	Jive
Christian & Agnese	30 (6,6,6,6,6)	Tango
Paolo & Vicky	25 (5,6,5,5,4)	Merengue

=== Week 3 ===
Individual judges scores in charts below (given in parentheses) are listed in this order from left to right: Ivan Zazzaroni, Fabio Canino, Carolyn Smith, Lamberto Sposini and Guillermo Mariotto.

Running order

Couple	Score	Dance
Giuseppe & Nuria	26 (5,5,5,5,6)	Charleston
Barbara & Samuel	27 (6,5,5,6,5)	Rumba
Kaspar & Yulia	38 (7,7,8,8,8)	Jive
Vittoria & Stefano	41 (7,8,8,8,10)	Charleston
Gedeon & Samanta	33 (6,6,8,7,6)	Rumba
Bruno & Ola	31 (7,7,6,6,5)	Tango
Paolo & Vicky	34 (6,7,7,7,7)	Charleston
Christian & Agnese	35 (7,7,7,7,7)	Rumba
Madalina & Simone	33 (8,7,4,7,7)	Cha-Cha-Cha
Sara & Umberto	48 (10,9,10,9,10)	Salsa

=== Week 4 ===
Individual judges scores in charts below (given in parentheses) are listed in this order from left to right: Ivan Zazzaroni, Fabio Canino, Carolyn Smith, Lamberto Sposini and Guillermo Mariotto.

Running order

Couple	Score	Dance
Gedeon & Samanta	29 (6,6,5,5,7)	Quickstep
Vittoria & Stefano	38 (8,9,6,8,7)	Tango
Bruno & Ola	25 (5,6,4,5,5)	Cha-Cha-Cha
Kaspar & Yulia	32 (6,7,5,7,7)	Paso Doble
Christian & Agnese	24 (4,5,5,5,5)	Jive
Barbara & Samuel	30 (7,7,5,6,5)	Waltz
Madalina & Simone	32 (7,7,5,6,7)	Rumba
Paolo & Vicky	25 (5,6,5,5,4)	Salsa
Sara & Umberto	39 (8,8,7,8,8)	Jive

=== Week 5 ===
Individual judges scores in charts below (given in parentheses) are listed in this order from left to right: Ivan Zazzaroni, Fabio Canino, Carolyn Smith, Lamberto Sposini and Guillermo Mariotto.

Running order

Couple	Score	Dance
Barbara & Samuel	27 (6,6,5,6,4)	Boogie Woogie
Christian & Agnese	30 (6,6,6,7,5)	Waltz
Vittoria & Stefano	35 (7,7,6,7,8)	Salsa
Bruno & Ola	26 (5,6,5,5,5)	Rumba
Kaspar & Yulia	38 (7,6,9,8,8)	Samba
Sara & Umberto	40 (8,8,8,8,8)	Tango
Paolo & Vicky	21 (4,4,3,5,5)	Cha-Cha-Cha
Gedeon & Samanta	31 (5,5,8,6,7)	Boogie Woogie

=== Week 6 ===
Individual judges scores in charts below (given in parentheses) are listed in this order from left to right: Ivan Zazzaroni, Fabio Canino, Carolyn Smith, Lamberto Sposini and Guillermo Mariotto.

Running order

Couple	Score	Dance
Vittoria & Stefano	35 (6,7,7,7,8)	Quickstep
Gedeon & Samanta	39 (8,7,8,7,9)	Samba
Bruno & Ola	25 (5,5,6,5,4)	Waltz
Kaspar & Yulia	44 (9,8,10,9,8)	Boogie Woogie
Barbara & Samuel	36 (7,8,7,7,7)	Tango
Sara & Umberto	41 (7,9,8,8,9)	Cha-Cha-Cha
Christian & Agnese	30 (6,6,6,6,6)	Samba

=== Week 7 ===
Individual judges scores in charts below (given in parentheses) are listed in this order from left to right: Ivan Zazzaroni, Fabio Canino, Carolyn Smith, Lamberto Sposini and Guillermo Mariotto.

Running order

Couple	Score	Dance
Kaspar & Yulia	45 (8,9,9,9,10)	Cha-Cha-Cha
Bruno & Ola	34 (6,7,7,6,8)	Charleston
Sara & Umberto	41 (9,10,9,7,6)	Waltz
Barbara & Samuel	32 (7,7,6,6,6)	Paso Doble
Gedeon & Samanta	41 (7,7,9,8,10)	Jive
Christian & Agnese	31 (6,6,7,6,6)	Charleston

=== Week 8 ===
Individual judges scores in charts below (given in parentheses) are listed in this order from left to right: Ivan Zazzaroni, Fabio Canino, Carolyn Smith, Lamberto Sposini and Guillermo Mariotto.

Running order

Couple	Score	Dance
Bruno & Ola	39 (7,8,8,7,9)	Boogie Woogie
Alessandro & Annalisa	26 (6,5,5,6,4)	Tango
Madalina & Simone	37 (7,7,8,7,8)	Samba
Christian & Agnese	29 (6,6,6,6,5)	Quickstep
Alessia & Raimondo	29 (6,6,5,7,5)	Salsa
Paolo & Vicky	42 (8,8,8,8,10)	Tango
Giuseppe & Nuria	37 (7,6,9,7,8)	Boogie Woogie

=== Week 9 ===
Individual judges scores in charts below (given in parentheses) are listed in this order from left to right: Stefano Pantano, Fabio Canino, Carolyn Smith, Lamberto Sposini and Guillermo Mariotto.

Running order

Couple	Score	Dance
Barbara & Samuel	28 (5,6,5,6,6)	Quickstep
Vittoria & Stefano	45 (7,9,10,9,10)	Rumba
Kaspar & Yulia	43 (8,8,10,8,9)	Charleston
Christian & Agnese	33 (6,7,7,7,6)	Tango
Gedeon & Samanta	44 (8,8,10,8,10)	Waltz
Sara & Umberto	34 (6,6,8,7,7)	Paso Doble
Bruno & Ola	37 (7,8,7,7,8)	Colombian Salsa

=== Week 10 ===
Individual judges scores in charts below (given in parentheses) are listed in this order from left to right: Ivan Zazzaroni, Fabio Canino, Carolyn Smith and Guillermo Mariotto.

Running order

Couple	Score	Dance
Kaspar & Yulia	35 (9,10,8,8)	Quickstep
Sara & Umberto	35 (9,10,8,8)	Rumba
Gedeon & Samanta	29 (7,8,7,7)	Merengue
Christian & Agnese	30 (7,8,8,7)	Paso Doble
Vittoria & Stefano	40 (10,10,10,10)	Waltz
Bruno & Ola	38 (9,9,10,10)	Jive

== Bottom 3/4 ==
=== Week 1 ===
	Couple	First Dance	Dance-off Dance	% Votes
Saved by judges	Christian & Agnese	Paso Doble (21)	Salsa	N/A
Saved by public	Bruno & Ola	Paso Doble (13)	Merengue	45%
Saved by public	Alessia & Raimondo	Quickstep (13)	Paso Doble	41%
Eliminated	Alessandro & Annalisa	Quickstep (9)	Samba	14%

=== Week 2 ===
	Couple	First Dance	Dance-off Dance	% Votes
Saved by judges	Madalina & Simone	Jive (25)	Merengue	N/A
Saved by public	Barbara & Samuel	Salsa (22)	Jive	69%
Eliminated	Alessia & Raimondo	Jive (19)	Waltz	31%

=== Week 3 ===
	Couple	First Dance	Dance-off Dance	% Votes
Saved by judges	Bruno & Ola	Tango (31)	Samba	N/A
Saved by public	Barbara & Samuel	Rumba (27)	Samba	52%
Eliminated	Giuseppe & Nuria	Charleston (26)	Merengue	48%

=== Week 4 ===
	Couple	First Dance	Dance-off Dance	% Votes
Saved by judges	Christian & Agnese	Jive (24)	Boogie Woogie	N/A
Saved by public	Bruno & Ola	Cha-Cha-Cha (25)	Boogie Woogie	69%
Eliminated	Madalina & Simone	Rumba (32)	Boogie Woogie	31%

=== Week 5 ===
	Couple	First Dance	Dance-off Dance	% Votes
Saved by judges	Bruno & Ola	Rumba (26)	Jive	N/A
Saved by public	Christian & Agnese	Waltz (30)	Merengue	67%/71%
Eliminated	Paolo & Vicky	Cha-Cha-Cha (21)	Boogie Woogie	33%
Re-eliminated	Madalina & Simone	N/A	Jive	29%

=== Week 6 ===
	Couple	First Dance	Dance-off Dance	% Votes
Saved by judges	Christian & Agnese	Samba (30)	Paso Doble	N/A
Saved by public	Bruno & Ola	Waltz (25)	Samba	54%/77%
Eliminated	Vittoria & Stefano	Quickstep (35)	Samba	46%
Re-eliminated	Madalina & Simone	N/A	Paso Doble	23%

=== Week 7 ===
	Couple	First Dance	Dance-off Dance	% Votes
Saved by judges	Sara & Umberto	Waltz (41)	Charleston	N/A
Saved by public	Vittoria & Stefano	N/A	Paso Doble	52%
Eliminated	Bruno & Ola	Charleston (34)	Quickstep	49%
Eliminated	Christian & Agnese	Charleston (31)	Cha-Cha-Cha	51%/48%

=== Week 9 ===
	Couple	First Dance	Dance-off Dance	% Votes
Saved by judges	Bruno & Ola	Colombian Salsa (37)	Tango	N/A
Saved by public	Christian & Agnese	Tango (33)	Rumba	53%
Eliminated	Barbara & Samuel	Quickstep (28)	Merengue	47%

== Call-out order ==
The table below lists the order in which the contestants' fates were revealed. The order of the safe couples doesn't reflect the viewer voting results.

Order	1	2	3	4	5	6	7	8	9	10			
1	Sara & Umberto	Sara & Umberto	Sara & Umberto	Vittoria & Stefano	Barbara & Samuel	Sara & Umberto	Gedeon & Samanta	Barbara & Samuel	Gedeon & Samanta	Sara & Umberto	Sara & Umberto	Sara & Umberto	Kaspar & Yulia
2	Barbara & Samuel	Vittoria & Stefano	Gedeon & Samanta	Sara & Umberto	Vittoria & Stefano	Kaspar & Yulia	Kaspar & Yulia	Gedeon & Samanta	Vittoria & Stefano	Vittoria & Stefano	Vittoria & Stefano	Kaspar & Yulia	Sara & Umberto
3	Madalina & Simone	Bruno & Ola	Vittoria & Stefano	Barbara & Samuel	Kaspar & Yulia	Gedeon & Samanta	Barbara & Samuel	Kaspar & Yulia	Kaspar & Yulia	Kaspar & Yulia	Bruno & Ola	Bruno & Ola	
4	Kaspar & Yulia	Christian & Agnese	Madalina & Simone	Gedeon & Samanta	Sara & Umberto	Barbara & Samuel	Sara & Umberto	Sara & Umberto	Sara & Umberto	Bruno & Ola	Kaspar & Yulia	Vittoria & Stefano	
5	Vittoria & Stefano	Kaspar & Yulia	Christian & Agnese	Paolo & Vicky	Gedeon & Samanta	Christian & Agnese	Vittoria & Stefano	Vittoria & Stefano	Bruno & Ola	Christian & Agnese	Christian & Agnese		
6	Gedeon & Samanta	Paolo & Vicky	Kaspar & Yulia	Kaspar & Yulia	Bruno & Ola	Bruno & Ola	Bruno & Ola	Bruno & Ola	Christian & Agnese	Gedeon & Samanta			
7	Giuseppe & Nuria	Giuseppe & Nuria	Paolo & Vicky	Christian & Agnese	Christian & Agnese	Vittoria & Stefano	Christian & Agnese	Christian & Agnese	Barbara & Samuel				
8	Paolo & Vicky	Gedeon & Samanta	Bruno & Ola	Bruno & Ola	Paolo & Vicky	Madalina & Simone							
9	Christian & Agnese	Madalina & Simone	Barbara & Samuel	Madalina & Simone	Madalina & Simone								
10	Bruno & Ola	Barbara & Samuel	Giuseppe & Nuria										
11	Alessia & Raimondo	Alessia & Raimondo											
12	Alessandro & Annalisa												

This couple came in first place with the judges.
This couple came in last place with the judges.
This couple came in last place with the judges and was eliminated.
This couple was eliminated.
This couple was voted back into the competition.
This couple was voted back into the competition but then re-eliminated.
This couple passed to the next round automatically.
This couple won the competition.
This couple came second in the competition.
This couple came third in the competition.

== Dance Chart ==
Couple	1	2	3	4	5	6	7	8	9	10	
Kaspar & Yulia	Rumba	Tango	Jive	Paso Doble	Samba	Boogie Woogie	Cha-Cha-Cha	Disco	Charleston	Quickstep	Dance Medley
Sara & Umberto	Samba	Merengue	Salsa	Jive	Tango	Cha-Cha-Cha	Waltz	Disco	Paso Doble	Rumba	Dance Medley
Bruno & Ola	Paso Doble	Salsa	Tango	Cha-Cha-Cha	Rumba	Waltz	Charleston	Boogie Woogie	Colombian Salsa	Jive	Dance Medley
Vittoria & Stefano	Jive	Paso Doble	Charleston	Tango	Salsa	Quickstep	Paso Doble	Disco	Rumba	Waltz	Dance Medley
Christian & Agnese	Paso Doble	Tango	Rumba	Jive	Waltz	Samba	Charleston	Quickstep	Tango	Paso Doble	Dance Medley
Gedeon & Samanta	Tango	Paso Doble	Rumba	Quickstep	Boogie Woogie	Samba	Jive	Disco	Waltz	Merengue	
Barbara & Samuel	Cha-Cha-Cha	Salsa	Rumba	Waltz	Boogie Woogie	Tango	Paso Doble	Disco	Quickstep		
Paolo & Vicky	Jive	Merengue	Charleston	Salsa	Cha-Cha-Cha	Jive	Merengue	Tango		Tango	
Madalina & Simone	Salsa	Jive	Cha-Cha-Cha	Rumba	Jive	Paso Doble	Salsa	Samba			
Giuseppe & Nuria	Salsa	Samba	Charleston		Salsa	Samba	Samba	Boogie Woogie			
Alessia & Raimondo	Quickstep	Jive			Quickstep	Salsa	Waltz	Salsa			
Alessandro & Annalisa	Quickstep				Samba	Jive	Quickstep	Tango			

Highest scoring dance
Lowest scoring dance
