= Paolo Belli =

Italian singer and television presenter

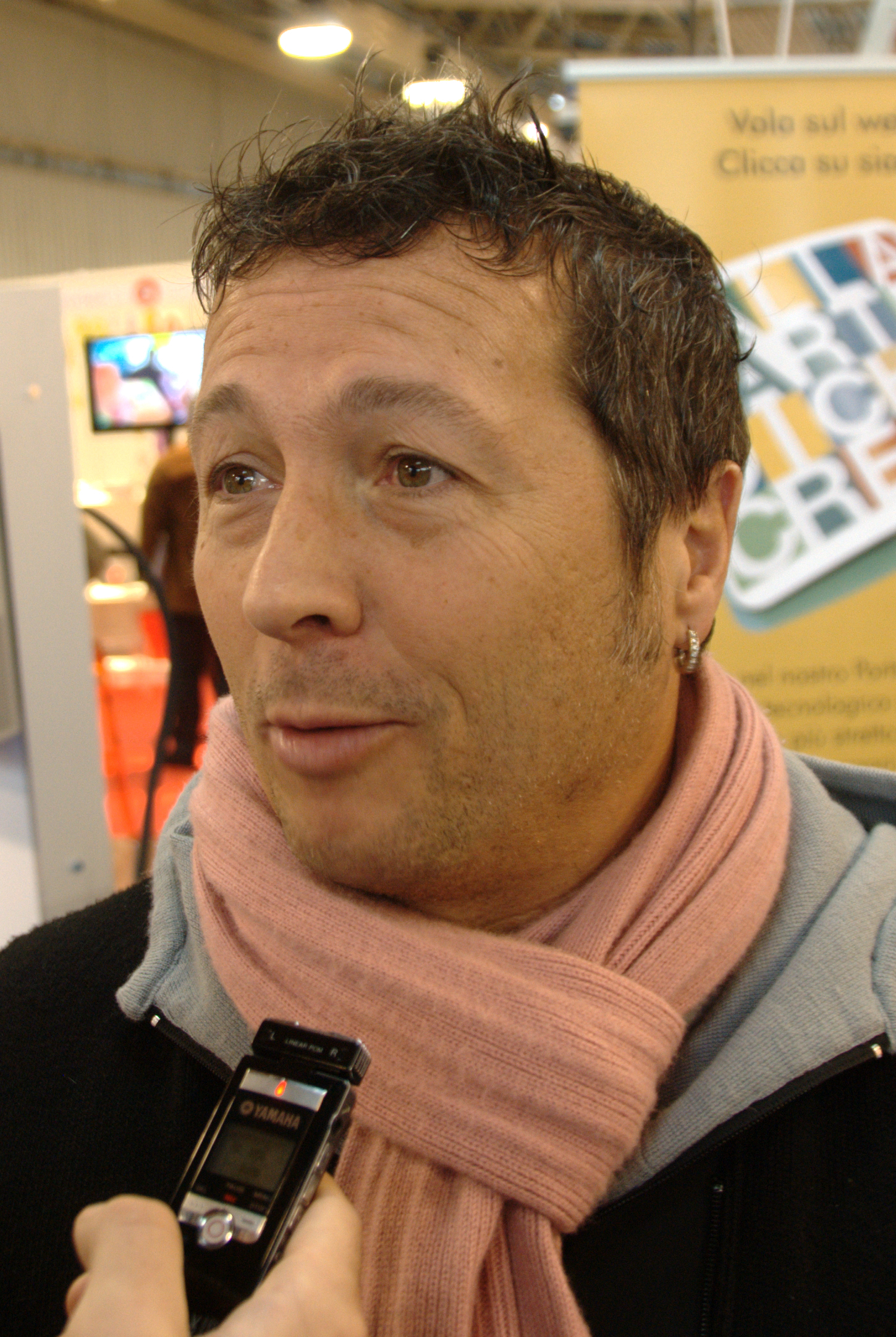
- Paolo Belli in 2009
- Born: Paolo Belli; 21 March 1962 (age 64); Formigine, Modena, Italy
- Occupations: Singer, television host
- Years active: 1989–present
- Website: http://www.paolobelli.it/

Paolo Belli (born 21 March 1962, in Formigine) is an Italian singer and television presenter.

== Biography ==
Singer since 1984, first with Ladri di Biciclette and then as a solo artist, Paolo Belli is best known for his co-host, with his Big Band, of the Italian version of the international reality show Strictly Come Dancing, hosted by Milly Carlucci and aired on Rai 1 with the name of Ballando con le Stelle from September 2005. In 2012, Belli hosted from 24 March to 7 April, with Ria Antoniou and Milly Carlucci, the race of champions named Ballando con te with past champions of the past editions of Ballando con le Stelle. In 2013, Paolo Belli along with Arianna Ciampoli and Fabrizio Frizzi, hosted the Italian version of Telethon aired on Rai 1. In 2014 Paolo Belli hosted the new edition, aired on Rai 2, of Telethon with Amadeus, Arianna Ciampoli, Fabrizio Frizzi, Caterina Balivo and Camila Raznovich. The professional couple Carlucci-Belli hosted many street events of Ballando and two editions of Telethon (in 2002 with Walter Santillo and Antonio Lubrano as co-hosts, in 2007 with Alessia Mancini as co-host) aired by Rai 1.

In 2016 he was part of the Italian jury at the Eurovision Song Contest.

In 2020 he sang Come gira il mondo in a duet with its author Franco Simone.

== Discography ==
=== With Ladri di Biciclette ===
- 1989 – Ladri di Biciclette
- 1991 – Figli di un DO minore

=== As a soloist ===
- 1993 – Paolo Belli & Rhythm Machine
- 1994 – Solo
- 1997 – Negro
- 1999 – A me mi piace... lo swing – live
- 2000 – Belli dentro
- 2001 – Belli... e pupe
- 2003 – I+Belli di... Paolo
- 2003 – Sorridi... e va avanti
- 2005 – Belli... in smoking
- 2006 – Più Belli di così
- 2009 – 20 anni
- 2011 – Giovani e Belli
- 2013 – Sangue Blues

== Singles ==
- 1989 – Ladri di Biciclette
- 1989 – Dr Jazz e Mr.Funk
- 1990 – Sotto questo sole con Francesco Baccini
- 2007 – Juve (storia di un grande amore)
- 2008 – Io sono un gigolò
- 2009 – L'opportunità con Pupo ed Youssou N'Dour
- 2009 – Una piccola bestia di razza di cane
- 2011 – Storie con il Trio Medusa
- 2011 – Faccio festa – Official theme song of the programme of 2011 Giro d'Italia
- 2020 - Come gira il mondo in duet with its author Franco Simone.
