= Milly Carlucci =

Italian television presenter (born 1954)

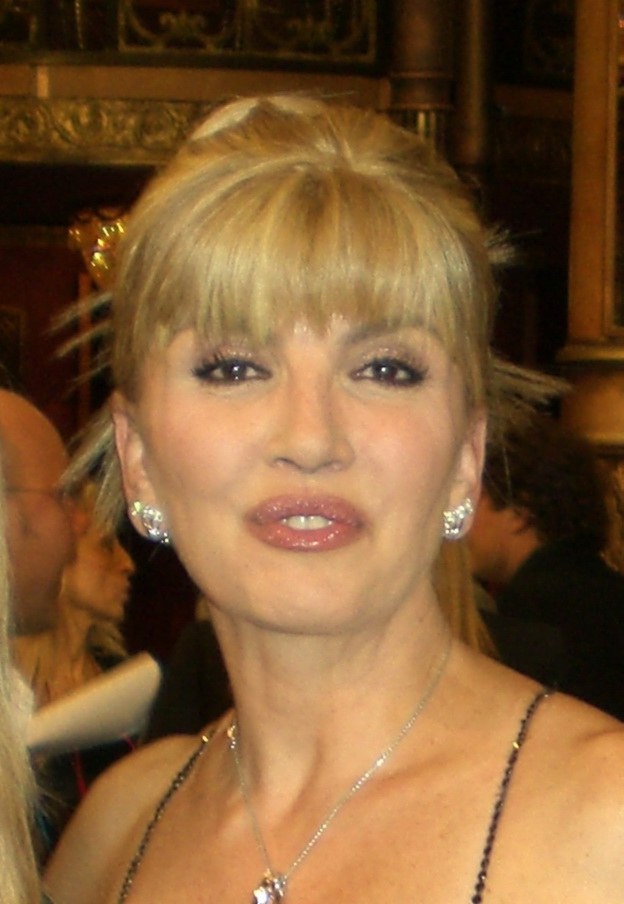
- Milly Carlucci in 2007
- Born: Camilla Patrizia Carlucci; 1 October 1954 (age 72); Sulmona, L'Aquila, Italy
- Occupations: Television presenter; actress; singer
- Years active: 1976–present
- Known for: Ballando con le Stelle; Scommettiamo che...?; L'altra domenica; Il cantante mascherato
- Spouse: Angelo Donati (m. 1985)
- Children: 2
- Relatives: Gabriella Carlucci (sister)

Camilla Patrizia "Milly" Carlucci (born 1 October 1954) is an Italian television presenter, actress and singer. Carlucci played the role of Urania in the 1985 film The Adventures of Hercules. In 1996 she became a Goodwill ambassador for UNICEF. Since 2005 she has been the sole host of Ballando con le Stelle ("Dancing with the Stars"), the Italian version of Strictly Come Dancing. In 2009 she became the first woman to host the Miss Italia beauty pageant. A top presenter of national broadcaster Rai 1, Carlucci is considered one of the most important women in Italian television.

== Biography ==
Born in Sulmona (AQ), she is the daughter of Luigi Carlucci, a general in the Italian Army, and Maria Caracciolo. She spent her childhood in Udine, before moving to Rome during her teenage years. While still a student at the Terenzio Mamiani State High School in Rome, she developed a Artistic roller skating and, with the Skating Folgore Roma team, won the Italian Championship in the club rankings.

In 1972, she won the Miss Teenager beauty contest, but her parents were not very supportive of young Milly's artistic aspirations, so they persuaded her to enroll in the Faculty (division) of Architecture. Milly will never feel suited to those studies, which she abandons without regret, having convinced her parents of her aspirations. She began her career at the television station GBR TV, where she appeared as a presenter alongside other very young debutantes such as Mimma Nocelli, Stefania Mecchia, and Viviana Antonini, all of whom later ended up at Rai or Mediaset with varying degrees of success.

== Filmography ==
=== Acting roles ===
| Year | Title | Role | Notes |
|---|---|---|---|
| 1980 | In the Pope's Eye | TV Announcing Nun | Cameo |
| 1980 | The Taming of the Scoundrel | Renata | |
| 1983 | Pappa e ciccia | Rosina Calore | |
| 1984 | Domani mi sposo | Simona | |
| 1985 | The Adventures of Hercules | Urania | |
| 1987 | La voglia di vincere | Fabrizia | Miniseries |
| 1988 | Arrivederci e grazie | Sandra | |
| 1994 | Tiempos mejores | Amelia "Mely" | |
| 1996 | Positano | Luisa | Miniseries |
| 2005 | L'isola degli smemorati | Greta | Voice role |

=== Television hosting ===
| Year | Title | Notes |
|---|---|---|
| 1976–1979 | L'altra domenica | Variety show |
| 1978–1981 | Jeux sans frontières | Game show |
| 1980–1981 | Crazy Bus | Variety show |
| 1981–1982 | Il sistemone | Game show (season 1) |
| 1981–1982 | Blitz | Variety show |
| 1983–1985; 1989 | Azzurro | Annual music event |
| 1983; 2009–2010 | Miss Italia | Annual beauty contest |
| 1984 | Risatissima | Variety show |
| 1986–1987 | Ciak d'oro | Annual award ceremony |
| 1986–1999 | Telegatto | Annual award ceremony |
| 1987–1989 | Vota la voce | Music competition show |
| 1988 | Ewiva | Variety show |
| 1989 | Bellezze al bagno | Game show (season 1) |
| 1991 | Sorrisi 40 anni vissuti insieme | Special |
| 1991–1996 | Scommettiamo che...? | Game show (seasons 1–6) |
| 1992 | Sanremo Music Festival 1992 | Annual music festival |
| 1992 | Donna sotto le stelle | Fashion show |
| 1994–1997 | Luna Park | Game show |
| 1995 | Papaveri e papere | Variety show |
| 1995–2003 | Pavarotti & Friends | Annual music concert event |
| 1998–2000 | Zecchino d'Oro | Children's talent competition series |
| 2001–2008 | Premio Regia Televisiva | Annual award ceremony |
| 2003 | Nel nome del cuore | Music show |
| 2004; 2010 | La Partita del Cuore | Special |
| 2005–present | Ballando con le Stelle | Dance competition series; also creator and executive producer |
| 2006–2007; 2015 | Notti sul ghiaccio | Talent show |
| 2010–2011 | 24mila voci | Talent show |
| 2012 | Ballando con te | Ballando con le Stelle's spin-off |
| 2014–present | Ballando on the Road | Ballando con le Stelle's spin-off |
| 2020–present | Il cantante mascherato | Talent show; also creator and executive producer |
| 2026 | Canzonissima | Variety and music show (season 13) |

== Accolades ==
| Year | Award | Category | Nominated work | Result | Ref. |
|---|---|---|---|---|---|
| 1984 | Telegatto | Best Variety Programme | Risatissima | Won | |
| 1987 | Telegatto | Best Made-For-TV Movie | La voglia di vincere | Won | |
| 1990 | Premio DonnaRoma | Miss Sympathy | Herself | Won | |
| 1992 | Telegatto | Best Variety Programme | Scommettiamo che…? | Won | |
| 1992 | Premio Regia Televisiva | Best Game/Quiz Show | Scommettiamo che…? | Won | |
| 1993 | Premio Regia Televisiva | Best Entertainment Programme | Scommettiamo che…? | Won | |
| 1995 | Premio Regia Televisiva | Best Game/Quiz Show | Luna Park | Won | |
| 1996 | UNICEF | Goodwill Ambassador | Herself | Honoured | |
| 1996 | Premio Regia Televisiva | Best Ratings | Scommettiamo che…? | Won | |
| 1996 | Telegatto | Best Quiz | Luna Park | Won | |
| 2001 | Goccia d'Oro | | Herself | Won | |
| 2003 | Premio Regia Televisiva | Telethon Award | Herself | Won | |
| 2003 | Premio Minerva | | Herself | Won | |
| 2005 | Premio Gino Tani | | Herself | Won | |
| 2005 | Premio Regia Televisiva | Top Ten | Ballando con le Stelle | Won | |
| 2006 | Premio Regia Televisiva | Top Ten | Ballando con le Stelle | Won | |
| 2006 | Premio Regia Televisiva | Best Competition Programme | Ballando con le Stelle | Won | |
| 2006 | Premio Roma per il Ballo | | Ballando con le Stelle | Won | |
| 2006 | Premio Barocco | | Herself | Won | |
| 2007 | Telegatto | Special Award | Ballando con le Stelle | Won | |
| 2007 | Premio Regia Televisiva | Top Ten | Ballando con le Stelle | Won | |
| 2009 | Premio Regia Televisiva | Top Ten | Ballando con le Stelle | Won | |
| 2009 | Premio Regia Televisiva | TV Programme of the Year | Ballando con le Stelle | Won | |
| 2009 | Premio Donne Eccellenti | | Herself | Won | |
| 2010 | Premio Regia Televisiva | Top Ten | Ballando con le Stelle | Won | |
| 2010 | Premio Regia Televisiva | TV Programme of the Year | Ballando con le Stelle | Won | |
| 2010 | Premio Alberto Sordi | | Herself | Won | |
| 2012 | Premio Regia Televisiva | Top Ten | Ballando con le Stelle | Won | |
| 2014 | Premio Regia Televisiva | Top Ten | Ballando con le Stelle | Won | |
| 2015 | Premio Regia Televisiva | Top Ten | Ballando con le Stelle | Won | |
| 2018 | Premio Biagio Agnes | Honorary Award | Herself | Won | |
| 2019 | Premio Marisa Bellisario | Golden Apple | Herself | Won | |

== Awards ==
| Order of Merit of the Italian Republic (Officer), 2004 |
