= Pechino Express =

Reality game show

- Genre: Reality
- Created by: Ludo Poppe
- Based on: Peking Express
- Presented by: Emanuele Filiberto of Savoy (2012); Costantino della Gherardesca (2013-present)
- Country of origin: Italy
- Original language: Italian
- No. of seasons: 13
- No. of episodes: 130

Production
- Producer: Banijay Italy
- Production location: Various
- Running time: 110-120 minutes (seasons 1-3, 9-present); 150 minutes (seasons 4-8)

Original release
- Network: Rai 2 (2012-2020); Sky Uno, Now and TV8 (2022-present)
- Release: 13 September 2012 – present

Pechino Express (lit. 'Beijing Express') is the Italian TV version of the Dutch-Belgian reality show Peking Express created by Ludo Poppe. It has been broadcast on Rai 2 from 2012 to 2020 and on Sky Uno, Now (live streaming) and TV8 (reruns) since 2022.

== Format ==
The show features a race between couples made of famous and unknown people, who compete along a route of 10 legs through various countries to reach a specific destination over a multi-day journey. Each competitor is provided with a minimum amount of supplies, contained in a backpack, and one euro per day in local currency with which to cover their basic needs. Couples cannot use the money to pay for transportation or a stay, although they can ask local residents to pay for them. In order to get around, couples have to hitchhike, whilst to find a place to stay for the night, they have to rely on local hospitality.

On the various paths there are small "quests" which the couples must complete in order to advance in the game. Halfway along the route, there is a destination where the couples will find the Red Book of Pechino Express, which they must sign to certify their arrival. Here, the most important challenge of each leg takes place between the first 2, 3 or 4 couples to arrive: the challenge for immunity or the challenge for the advantage. Starting from season 4, this challenge has not been offered in some episodes; in these cases, the couple which receives the immunity or the advantage is the first to reach the Red Book of Pechino Express. If the leg features a challenge for immunity, the couple winning it automatically qualifies for the following leg, doesn't have to complete the leg and usually gets to spend the night in a comfortable place, while if a challenge for advantage is offered, the couple winning it still has to finish the race and risks being eliminated, but starts the second part of the leg with a bonus which can be decisive to be able to win the leg and advance. In both cases, the couple winning the challenge also has to decide which of the remaining couples gets a malus, which can slow down the race and increase the chances of ending last.

At the finish line there is a red mat, onto which the couples have to jump in order to complete the leg. The winning couple of each leg is awarded a medal worth €5,000 to be donated to a charity working in the countries visited throughout the race. During the awards ceremony, the host announces the order of arrival of all the couples and afterwards the winners have to decide which of the last two couples to finish will be eliminated. The chosen couple has to face the verdict of the Black Envelope of Pechino Express, which says if the leg is eliminatory or not. Starting from season 10, the winning couple of each leg also has to choose which of remaining couples starts the following leg with a malus.

In the final episode of the show, the three or four remaining couples compete in a final sprint to reach the finish line. The first part of this final leg decides the two finalist couples, while the second part determines the winning couple. The winners receive a medal worth €10,000 to be donated to a charity working in the countries visited throughout the race.

== Series overview ==
Season	Season's subtitle	Hosting		Channel	Premiere	Finale	Continent	Route	Visited countries	Winning couple
Season	Season's subtitle	Main host	Co-host	Channel	Premiere	Finale	Continent	Route	Visited countries	Winning couple
1	Avventura in Oriente (Adventure in the East)	Emanuele Filiberto of Savoy	—N/a	Rai 2	September 13, 2012	November 15, 2012	Asia	Haridwar to Beijing	India; Nepal; China	Alessandro Sampaoli & Debora Villa (Gli attori)
2	Obiettivo Bangkok (Goal: Bangkok)	Costantino della Gherardesca	—N/a	Rai 2	September 8, 2013	November 4, 2013	Asia	Hanoi to Bangkok	Vietnam; Cambodia; Laos; Thailand	Massimiliano Rosolino & Marco Maddaloni (Gli sportivi)
3	Ai confini dell'Asia (At the boundaries of Asia)	Costantino della Gherardesca	—N/a	Rai 2	September 7, 2014	November 3, 2014	Asia	Mandalay to Bali	Myanmar; Malaysia; Singapore; Indonesia	Stefano Corti & Alessandro Onnis (I coinquilini)
4	Il nuovo mondo (The new world)	Costantino della Gherardesca	—N/a	Rai 2	September 7, 2015	November 2, 2015	America	Quito to Rio de Janeiro	Ecuador; Peru; Brazil	Antonio Andrea Pinna & Roberto Bertolini (Gli antipodi)
5	Le civiltà perdute (The lost civilizations)	Costantino della Gherardesca	—N/a	Rai 2	September 12, 2016	November 14, 2016	America	Bogotá to Mexico City	Colombia; Guatemala; Mexico	Alessio Stigliano & Alessandro Tenace (I socialisti)
6	Verso il Sol Levante (Towards the Rising Sun)	Costantino della Gherardesca	—N/a	Rai 2	September 13, 2017	November 15, 2017	Asia	Padre Burgos to Tokyo	Philippines; Taiwan; Japan	Ema Stokholma & Valentina Pegorer (Le clubber)
7	Avventura in Africa (Adventure in Africa)	Costantino della Gherardesca	—N/a	Rai 2	September 20, 2018	November 22, 2018	Africa	Tangier to Cape Town	Morocco; Tanzania; South Africa	Patrizia Rossetti & Maria Teresa Ruta (Le signore della TV)
8	Le stagioni dell'Oriente (The seasons of the East)	Costantino della Gherardesca	—N/a	Rai 2	February 11, 2020	April 14, 2020	Asia	Ko Phra Thong to Seoul	Thailand; China; South Korea	Nicole Rossi & Jennifer Poni (Le collegiali)
9	La rotta dei sultani (The route of the sultans)	Costantino della Gherardesca	Enzo Miccio	Sky Uno; Now; TV8	March 10, 2022	May 12, 2022	Asia	Uçhisar to Dubai	Turkey; Uzbekistan; Jordan; United Arab Emirates	Victoria Cabello & Paride Vitale (I pazzeschi)
10	La via delle Indie (The route of the Indies)	Costantino della Gherardesca	Enzo Miccio	Sky Uno; Now; TV8	March 9, 2023	May 11, 2023	Asia	Mumbai to Angkor	India; Malaysia; Cambodia	Joe Bastianich & Andrea Belfiore (Gli italoamericani)
11	La rotta del dragone (The route of the dragon)	Costantino della Gherardesca	Gianluca Fru	Sky Uno; Now; TV8	March 7, 2024	May 9, 2024	Asia	Tam Cốc to Sigiriya	Vietnam; Laos; Sri Lanka	Damiano Carrara & Massimiliano Carrara (I pasticceri)
12	Fino al tetto del mondo (Up to the Roof of the World)	Costantino della Gherardesca	Gianluca Fru	Sky Uno; Now; TV8	March 6, 2025	May 8, 2025	Asia	El Nido to Kathmandu	Philippines; Thailand; Nepal	Jury Chechi & Antonio Rossi (I medagliati)
13	L'Estremo Oriente (The Far East)	Costantino della Gherardesca	Lillo, Giulia Salemi and Guido Meda	Sky Uno; Now; TV8	March 12, 2026	May 14, 2026	Asia	Bali to Kyoto	Indonesia; China; Japan	Chanel Totti & Filippo Laurino (I raccomandati)
14	La rotta dei due oceani (The route of the two oceans)	Costantino della Gherardesca	—N/a	Sky Uno; Now; TV8	2027	2027	America	Iquique to Rio de Janeiro	Chile; Argentina; Brazil	TBD

== Season 1: Pechino Express - Avventura in Oriente (2012) ==
Visited countries: India - Nepal - China

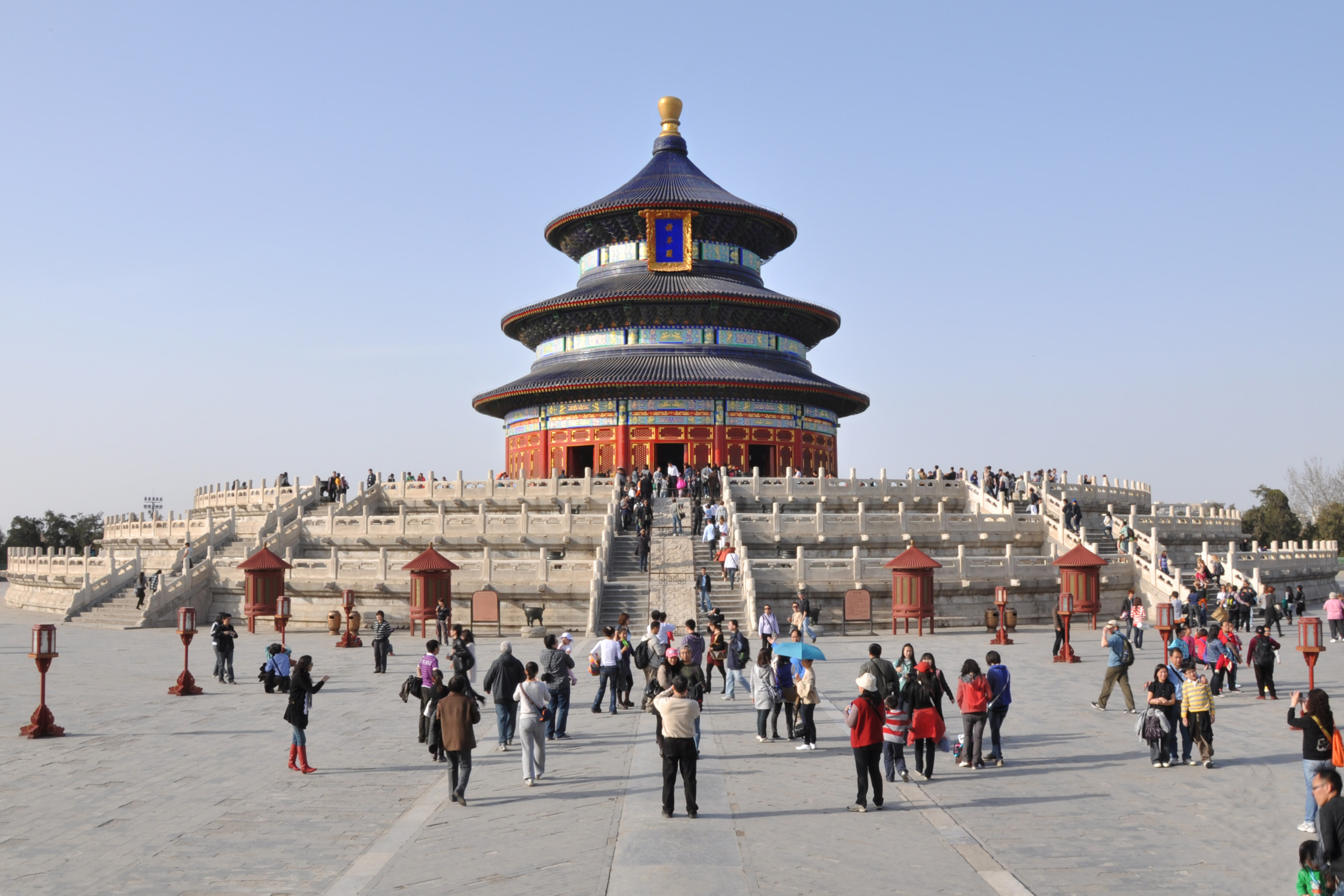
The Temple of Heaven in Beijing, final destination of season 1.

Season 1 of Pechino Express was presented by Emanuele Filiberto of Savoy and was broadcast on Rai 2 from September 13 to November 15, 2012. The subtitle of the season was Avventura in Oriente (Adventure in the East) and the route started in India, Haridwar, and continued through Nepal and China, finishing at the Temple of Heaven in Beijing. The winners of the season were actors Alessandro Sampaoli and Debora Villa, Gli attori (the actors).

Route

Leg	Country	Departure	Intermediate stop	Arrival	Distance
1	India	Haridwar	Haldaur	Delhi	333 km
2	India	Delhi	Jaipur	Agra	490 km
3	India	Agra	Orchha	Khajuraho	417 km
4	India	Khajuraho	Varanasi	Gorakhpur	616 km
T	Gorakhpur - Lumbini				80 km (in beeline)
5	Nepal	Lumbini	Sauraha	Pokhara	300 km
6	Nepal	Pokhara	Thankot	Kathmandu	200 km
T	Kathmandu - Shanghai				3 500 km (in beeline)
7	China	Shanghai	Wuzhen	Qufu	890 km
8	China	Qufu	Tai'an	Weifang	340 km
9	China	Weifang	Cangzhou	Tianjin	500 km
10	China	Haidian	Beijing	Beijing	170 km
Total					ca. 7 800 km

Contestants

Place	Couple	Members	Status
1	Gli Attori (The actors)	Alessandro Sampaoli & Debora Villa	Winners
2	I ballerini (The dancers)	Andrés Gil & Anastasia Kuzmina	Runners-up
3	Zio e nipote (Uncle and nephew)	Costantino della Gherardesca & Barù	Eliminated (leg 10)
4	I fidanzati (The lovers)	Simone Rugiati & Malvina Seferi	Eliminated (leg 9)
5	Padre e figlio (Father and son)	Antonio & Marco Pizza	Eliminated (leg 8)
6	Le veline (The veline)	Costanza Caracciolo & Federica Nargi	Eliminated (leg 6)
7	Gli sportivi (The sportsmen)	Giorgio Rocca & Niccolò Comi	Eliminated (leg 5)
8	Madre e figlio (Mother and son)	Simona Izzo & Francesco Venditti	Eliminated (leg 4)
9	Marito e moglie (Husband and wife)	Massimiliano Lanza & Letizia Soldatelli	Eliminated (leg 2)
10	I fratelli (The brothers)	Alarico & Armando Salaroli	Eliminated (leg 1)
11	I promessi sposi (The betrothed)	Carla Carlesi & Riccardo Corsi	Withdrawn (leg 1)

== Season 2: Pechino Express - Obiettivo Bangkok (2013) ==
Visited countries: Vietnam - Cambodia - Laos - Thailand

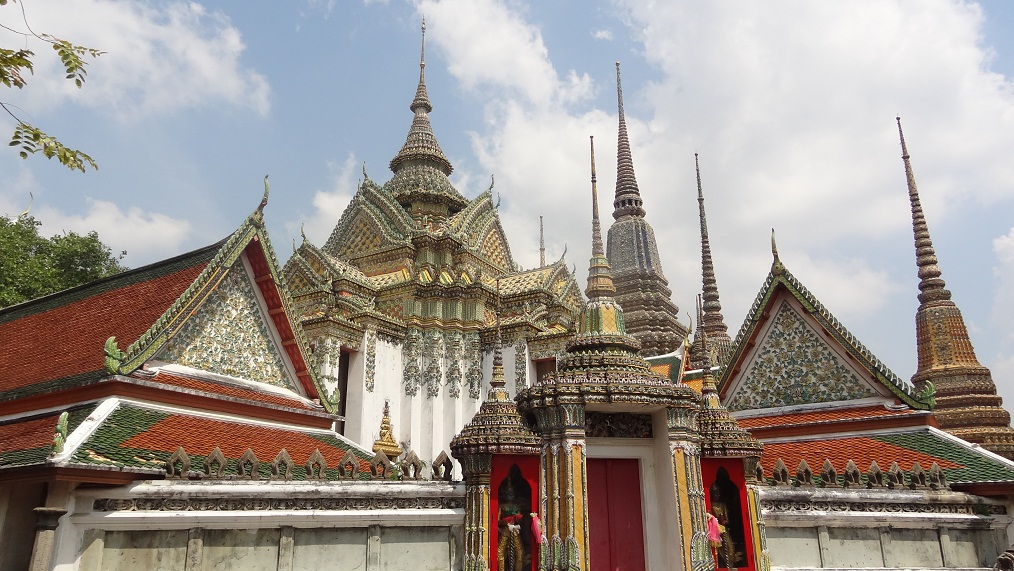
The Wat Pho temple complex in Bangkok, final destination of season 2.

Season 2 of Pechino Express was presented by Costantino della Gherardesca and was broadcast on Rai 2 from September 8 to November 4, 2013. The subtitle of the season was Obiettivo Bangkok (Goal: Bangkok) and the route started in Vietnam, at the Ba Đình Square in Hanoi, and continued through Cambodia, Laos and Thailand, finishing at the Wat Pho temple complex in Bangkok. The winners of the season were athletes Massimiliano Rosolino and Marco Maddaloni, Gli sportivi (The sportsmen).

Route

Leg	Country	Departure	Intermediate stop	Arrival	Distance
1	Vietnam	Hanoi	Hạ Long Bay	Vinh	530 km
2	Vietnam	Đồng Hới	Huế	Plei Kân	450 km
3	Vietnam	Kon Tum	Buôn Ma Thuột	Đà Lạt	460 km
4	Vietnam	Đà Lạt	Bảo Lộc	Ho Chi Minh City	330 km
T	Ho Chi Minh City - Phnom Penh				210 km (in beeline)
5	Cambodia	Phnom Penh	Siem Reap	Ko Koh	650 km
6	Cambodia	Ko Koh	Kouk Char	Stung Treng	360 km
T	Stung Treng - Vientiane				600 km (in beeline)
7	Laos	Vientiane	Vang Vieng	Luang Prabang	450 km
8	Laos	Luang Prabang	Chaleunsouk	Houayxay	580 km
T	Houayxay - Chiang Mai				540 km (in beeline)
9	Thailand	Chiang Mai	Si Satchanalai	Ayutthaya	650 km
10	Thailand	Damnoen Saduak	Kanchanaburi	Bangkok	310 km
Total					ca. 6 000 km

Contestants

Place	Couple	Members	Status
1	Gli sportivi (The sportsmen)	Massimiliano Rosolino & Marco Maddaloni	Winners
2	Le modelle (The models)	Francesca Fioretti & Ariadna Romero	Runners-up
3	I laureati (The graduated)	Laura Caratelli & Daniel Moreno Mendoza	Eliminated (leg 10)
4	I figli di (The nepo babies)	Costantino "Costia" & Giovanni Teodori	Eliminated (leg 9)
5	Padre e figlio (Father and son)	Massimo & Paolo Ciavarro	Eliminated (leg 8)
6	Marchesa e maggiordomo (Marchioness and butler)	Daniela del Secco d'Aragona & Gregory Jayasena Sangapala Arachchinge Don	Eliminated (leg 7)
7	I fidanzati (The lovers)	Corinne Cléry & Angelo Costabile	Eliminated (leg 5)
8	Gli olimpionici (The olympians)	Massimiliano Rosolino & Alessandra Sensini	Withdrawn (leg 5)
9	Gli amici (The friends)	Alessio Sakara & Stefano Venturini	Eliminated (leg 4)
10	Gli attori (The actors)	Micol Olivieri & Niccolò Centioni	Eliminated (leg 2)

== Season 3: Pechino Express - Ai confini dell'Asia (2014) ==
Visited countries: Myanmar - Malaysia - Singapore - Indonesia

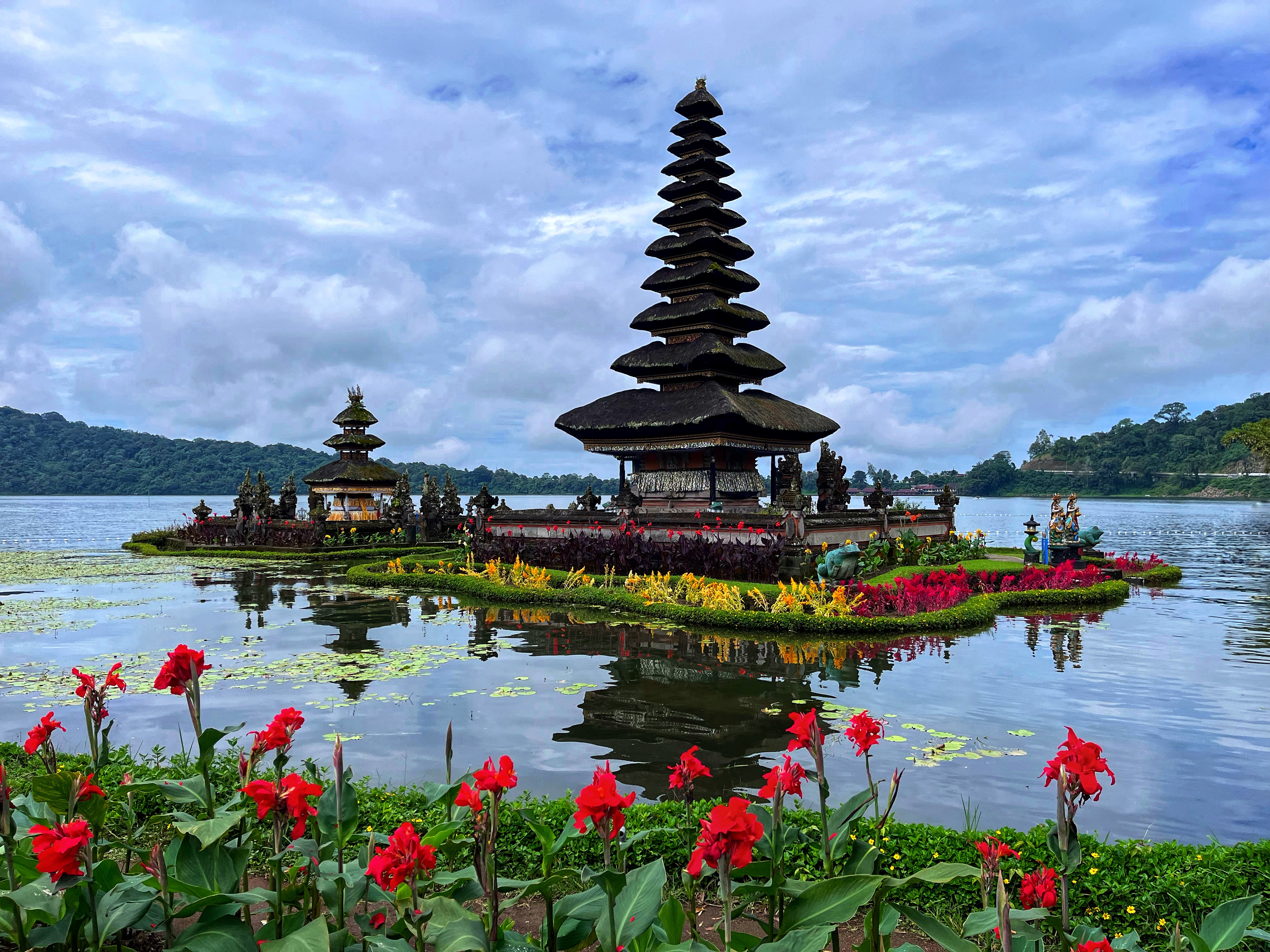
Bali, final destination of season 3.

Season 3 of Pechino Express was presented by Costantino della Gherardesca and was broadcast on Rai 2 from September 7 to November 3, 2014. The subtitle of the season was Ai confini dell'Asia (At the boundaries of Asia) and the route started in Myanmar, at the royal palace in Mandalay, amd continued through Malaysia, Singapore and Indonesia, finishing at the Lotus Garden in Ubud, on the island of Bali. The winners of the season were comicians and TV personalities Stefano Corti and Alessandro Onnis, I coinquilini (The flatmates).

Route

Leg	Country	Departure	Intermediate stop	Arrival	Distance
1	Myanmar	Mandalay	Bagan	Meiktila	400 km
2	Myanmar	Oo Yin	Kalaw	Taunggyi	240 km
3	Myanmar	Nyaung Shwe	Namphan	Yamethin	290 km
4	Myanmar	Yamethin	Thar Ga Ya	Yangon	450 km
T	Yangon - George Town				1 308 km (in beeline)
5	Malaysia	George Town	Cameron Highlands	Kuala Lumpur	570 km
6	Malaysia; Singapore	Kuala Lumpur	Johor Bahru	Singapore	230 km
T	Singapore - Kampung Naga				1 000 km (in beeline)
7	Indonesia	Kampung Naga	Cilacap	Yogyakarta	400 km
8	Indonesia	Yogyakarta	Borobudur	Trowulan	400 km
9	Indonesia	Kampong Winong	Merapi	Banyuwangi	410 km
10	Indonesia	Menjangan	Bedugul	Ubud	210 km
Total					ca. 6 000 km.

Contestants

Place	Couple	Members	Status
1	I coinquilini (The flatmates)	Stefano Corti & Alessandro Onnis	Winners
2	I Pérez (The Pérez)	Amaurys Pérez & Angela Rende	Runners-up
3	Le cougar (The cougars)	Eva Grimaldi & Roberta Garzia	Eliminated (leg 10)
4	Le cattive (The evil)	Alessandra "Angelina" Angeli & Antonella Ventura	Eliminated (leg 9)
5	Gli sposini (The newlyweds)	La Pina & Emiliano Pepe	Eliminated (leg 8)
6	Le immigrate (The immigrants)	Romina Giamminelli & Mariana Rodríguez	Eliminated (leg 7)
7	I coreografi (The choreographers)	Alessandra Celentano & Corrado Giordani	Eliminated (leg 6)
8	I fratelli (The brothers)	Clementino & Paolo Maccaro	Eliminated (leg 5)
9	Gli eterosessuali (The heterosexual)	Luca Betti & Michael Lewis	Eliminated (leg 4)
10	I benestanti (The wealthy)	Sofia Odescalchi & Uberto Marchesi	Eliminated (leg 2)

== Season 4: Pechino Express - Il nuovo mondo (2015) ==
Visited countries: Ecuador - Peru - Brazil

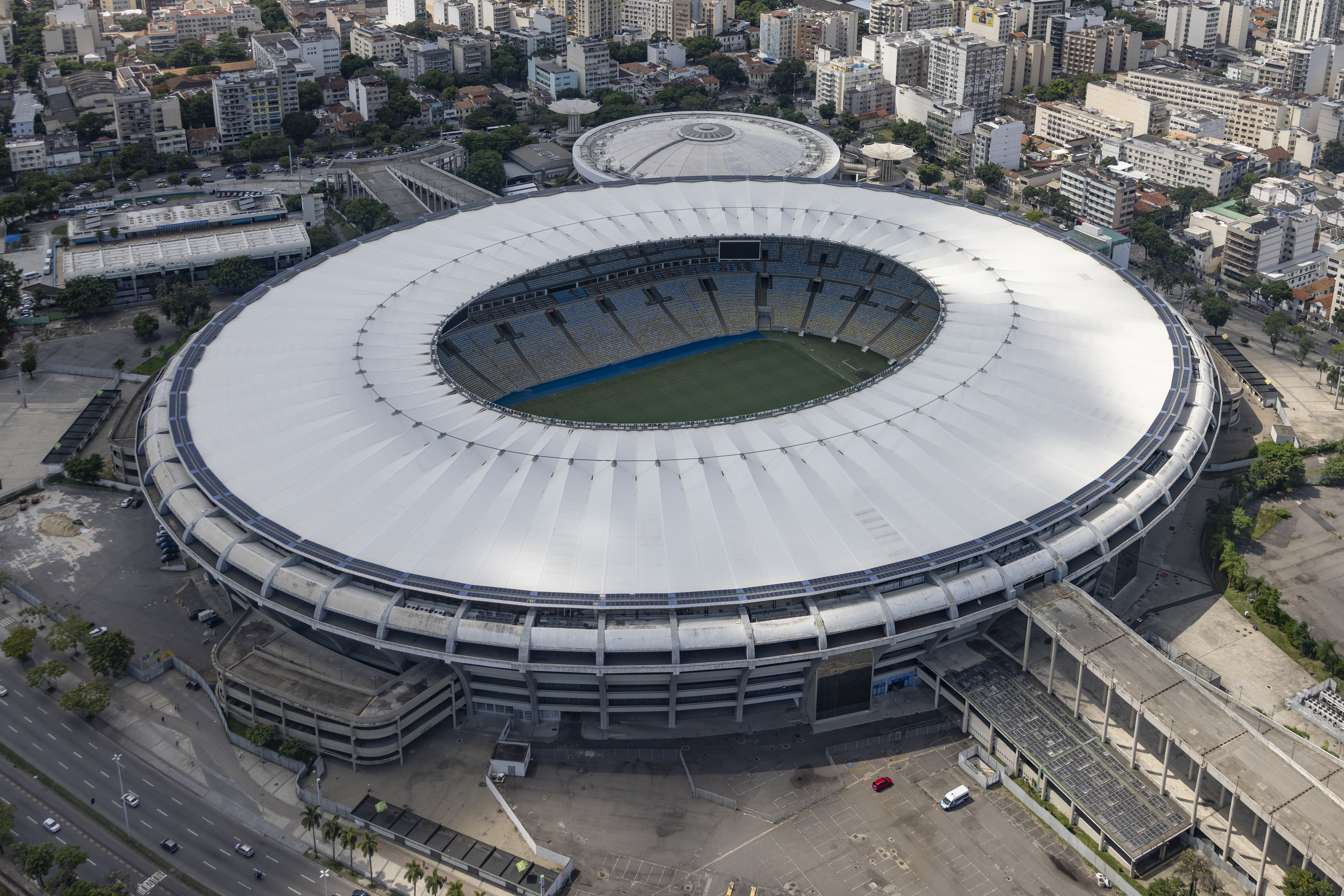
The Maracanã Stadium in Rio de Janeiro, final destination of season 4.

Season 4 of Pechino Express was presented by Costantino della Gherardesca and was broadcast on Rai 2 from September 7 to November 2, 2015. The subtitle of the season was Il nuovo mondo (The new world) and it was the first season in America. The route started in Ecuador, at the Plaza de San Francisco in Quito, and continued through Peru and Brazil, finishing at the Maracanã Stadium in Rio de Janeiro. The winners of the season were web and TV personality Antonio Andrea Pinna and his personal trainer and friend Roberto Bertolini, Gli antipodi (The antipodes).

Route

Leg	Country	Departure	Intermediate stop	Arrival	Distance
1	Ecuador	Quito	Pichincha	San José de Aguarico	230 km
2	Ecuador	Rumicucho	Zumbahua	Baños	380 km
3	Ecuador	Baños	Urbina	Cuenca	350 km
4	Ecuador	Cuenca	Machala	Salinas	510 km
T	Salinas - Lima				1 000 km (in beeline)
5	Peru	Lima	Lunahuaná	Huacachina	400 km
6	Peru	Huacachina	Nazca	Puquio	320 km
7	Peru	Abancay	Ollantaytambo	Cusco	300 km
8	Peru	Cusco	Abra la Raya	Puno	410 km
T	Puno - São Paulo				2 500 km (in beeline)
9	Brazil	São Paulo	Nossa Senhora dos Remédios	Paraty	330 km
10	Brazil	Paraty	Rio de Janeiro	Rio de Janeiro	300 km
Total					ca. 7000 km

Contestants

Place	Couple	Members	Status
1	Gli antipodi (The antipodes)	Antonio Andrea Pinna & Roberto Bertolini	Winners
2	Gli espatriati (The expats)	Christian "Kang" Bachini & Son Pascal	Runners-up
3	Le persiane (The Persians)	Giulia Salemi & Fariba Tehrani	Eliminated (leg 10)
4	Le professoresse (The professors)	Laura Forgia & Eleonora Cortini	Eliminated (leg 10)
5	Gli artisti (The artists)	Paola Barale & Piero Filoni	Eliminated (leg 8)
6	Fratello e sorella (Brother and sister)	Naike Rivelli & Andrea Fachinetti	Withdrawn (leg 7)
7	Gli stellati (The star-rated)	Philippe Léveillé & Ciccio Sultano	Eliminated (leg 6)
8	Gli artisti (The artists)	Paola Barale & Luca Tommassini	Withdrawn (leg 4)
9	I compagni (The boyfriends)	Scialpi & Roberto Blasi	Eliminated (leg 4)
10	Gli illuminati (The enlightened)	Yari Carrisi & Pico Rama	Eliminated (leg 3)

== Season 5: Pechino Express - Le civiltà perdute (2016) ==
Visited countries: Colombia - Guatemala - Mexico

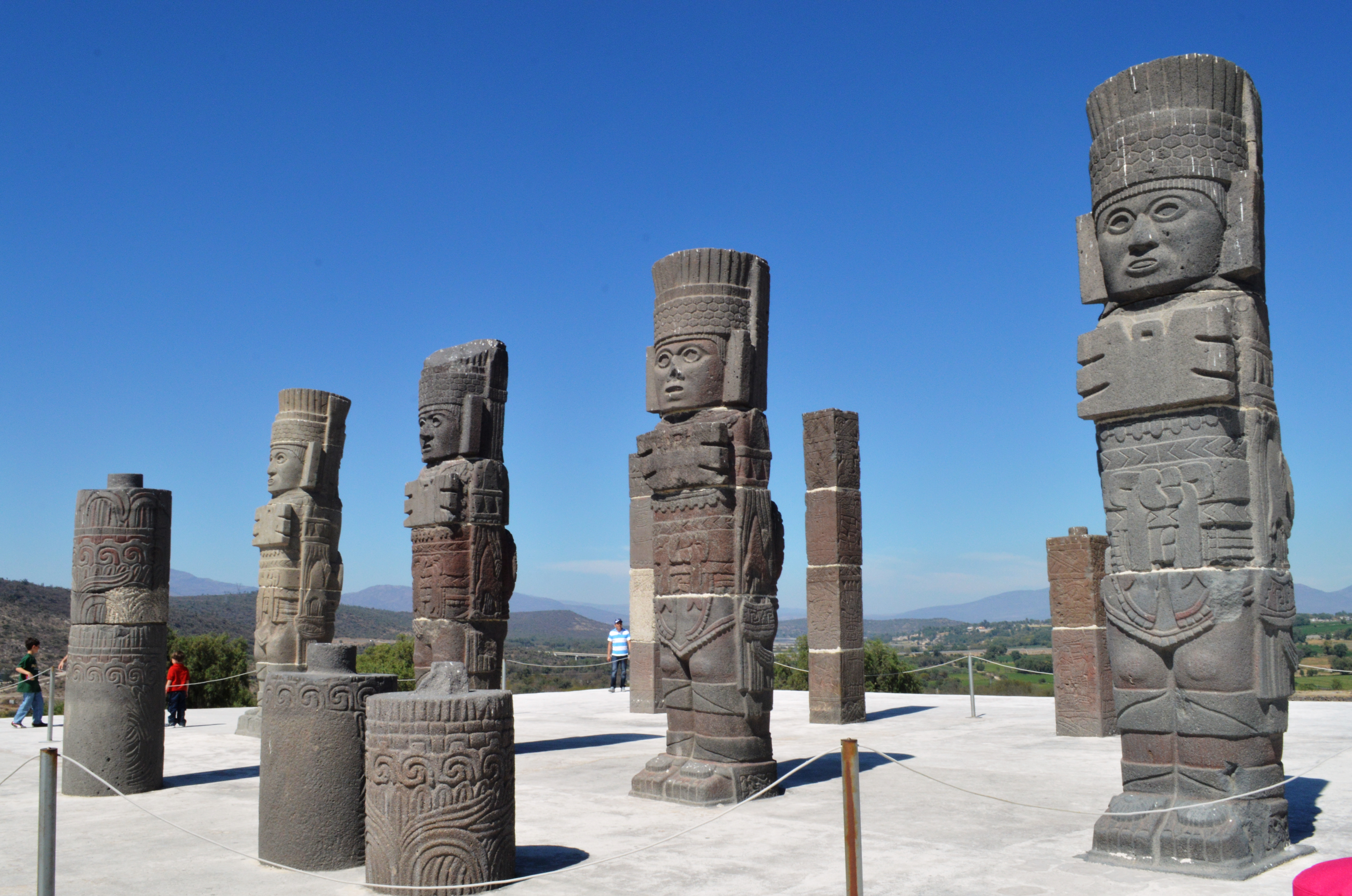
The archaeological complex of Tula, final destination of season 5.

Season 5 of Pechino Express was presented by Costantino della Gherardesca and was broadcast on Rai 2 from September 12 to November 14, 2016. The subtitle of the season was Le civiltà perdute (The lost civilizations) and the route started in Colombia, at the Caracol Televisión studios in Bogotá, and continued through Guatemala and Mexico, finishing at the archaeological site of Tula. The winners of the season were YouTube duo theShow, consisting of Alessio Stigliano and Alessandro Tenace, I socialisti (The socialists).

Route

Leg	Country	Departure	Intermediate stop	Arrival	Distance
1	Colombia	Bogotá	Filandia	Puerto Alejandría	400 km
2	Colombia	Manizales	Santa Fe de Antioquia	Medellín	400 km
3	Colombia	Santa Rosa de Osos	Planeta Rica	Tolú	430 km
4	Colombia	Tolú	Cartagena de Indias	Santa Marta	420 km
T	Santa Marta - Tikal				1 800 km (in beeline)
5	Guatemala	Tikal	Río Dulce	Quiriguá	330 km
6	Guatemala	Quiriguá	Antigua Guatemala	Chichicastenango	510 km
7	Guatemala	Chichicastenango	San Juan La Laguna	Huehuetenango	230 km
T	Huehuetenango - Orizaba				1 800 km (in beeline)
8	Mexico	Orizaba	Zapotitlán Salinas	Puebla de Zaragoza	300 km
9	Mexico	Puebla de Zaragoza	San Pedro Cholula	Tepoztlán	250 km
10	Mexico	San Pedro Atocpan	Mexico City	Tula	130 km
Total					ca. 7 000 km

Contestants

Place	Couple	Members	Status
1	I socialisti (The socialists)	Alessio Stigliano & Alessandro Tenace	Winners
2	I contribuenti (The taxpayers)	Diego Passoni & Cristina Bugatty	Runners-up
3	Gli innamorati (The lovers)	Lory Del Santo & Marco Cucolo	Eliminated (leg 10)
4	Gli spostati (The screwed up)	Tina Cipollari & Simone Di Matteo	Eliminated (leg 10)
5	Gli estranei (The strangers)	Silvia Farina & Marco Cubeddu	Eliminated (leg 9)
6	I coniugi (The spouses)	Francesco Sarcina & Clizia Incorvaia	Eliminated (leg 7)
7	Gli emiliani (The Emilians)	Xu Ruichi & Carlos Kamizele Kahunga	Eliminated (leg 6)
8	Le naturali (The natural)	Benedetta Mazza & Raffaella Modugno	Eliminated (leg 3)

== Season 6: Pechino Express - Verso il Sol Levante (2017) ==
Visited countries: Philippines - Taiwan - Japan

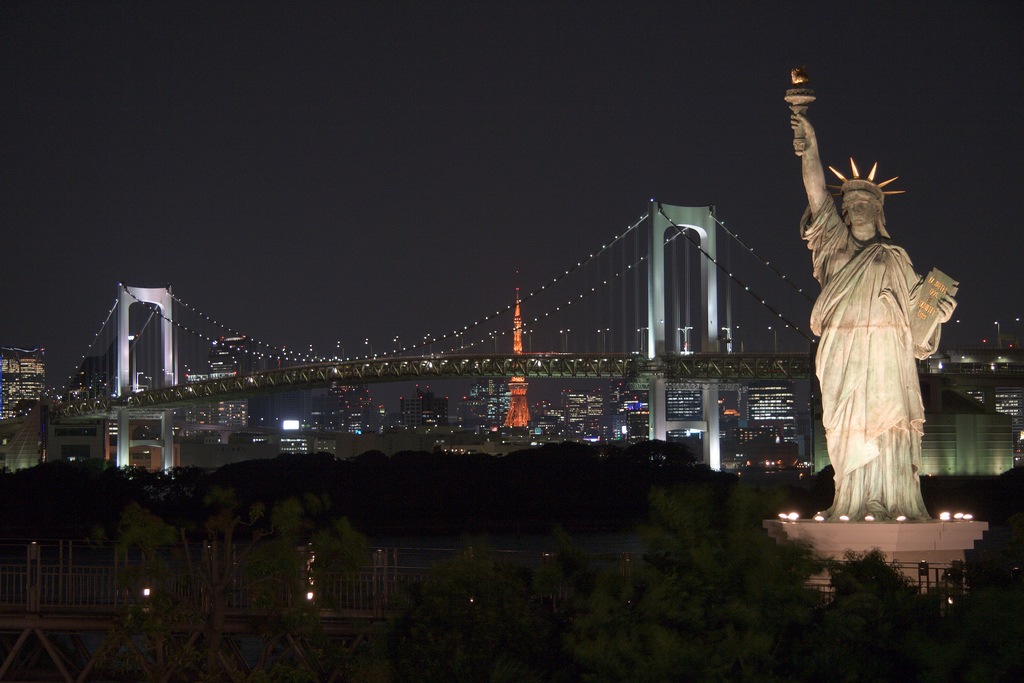
Tokyo, final destination of season 6.

Season 6 of Pechino Express was presented by Costantino della Gherardesca and was broadcast on Rai 2 from September 13 to November 8, 2017. The subtitle of the season was Verso il Sol Levante (Towards the Rising Sun) and the show was back to Asia. The route started in the Philippines, in Padre Burgos, and continued through Taiwan and Japan, finishing at the West Park Bridge in Tokyo.The winners of the season were TV and radio presenter Ema Stokholma and TV personality Valentina Pegorer, Le clubber (The clubbers). They were the first female couple to win the show.

Route

Leg	Country	Departure	Intermediate stop	Arrival	Distance
1	Philippines	Padre Burgos	Mabini	Manila	330 km
2	Philippines	Manila	Pulilan	Bagac	200 km
3	Philippines	Bagac	Bolinao	Baguio	420 km
4	Philippines	Baguio	Sagada	Muñoz	400 km
5	Philippines	Muñoz	Santa Juliana	Angeles	250 km
5	Taiwan	Kaohsiung	-	Tainan	250 km
6	Taiwan	Tainan	Sun Moon Lake	Lukang	260 km
7	Taiwan	Changhua	Tian-Mei	Taipei	300 km
T	Taipei - Himeji				1 800 km (in beeline)
8	Japan	Himeji	Osaka	Nara	400 km
9	Japan	Nara	Nagahama	Fujiyoshida	410 km
10	Japan	Yokohama	Tokyo	Tokyo	130 km
Total					ca. 5 000 km

Contestants

Place	Couple	Members	Status
1	Le clubber (The clubbers)	Ema Stokholma & Valentina Pegorer	Winners
2	Le caporali (The corporals)	Antonella Elia & Jill Cooper	Runners-up
3	I compositori (The composers)	Achille Lauro & Edoardo Manozzi	Eliminated (leg 10)
4	I maschi (The boys)	Francesco Arca & Rocco Giusti	Eliminated (leg 9)
5	I modaioli (The fashionable)	Marcelo Burlon & Michele Lamanna	Withdrawn (leg 7)
6	Gli amici (The friends)	Guglielmo Scilla & Alice Venturi	Eliminated (leg 7)
7	Figlia e matrigna (Daughter and stepmother)	Eugenia Costantini & Agata Cannizzaro	Eliminated (leg 5)
8	Las estrellas (The stars)	Olfo Bosé & Rafael Amargo	Eliminated (leg 3)
9	Gli Egger (The Eggers)	Cristina Vittoria Egger Bertotti & Alessandro Egger	Eliminated (leg 2)

== Season 7: Pechino Express - Avventura in Africa (2018) ==
Visited countries: Morocco - Tanzania - South Africa

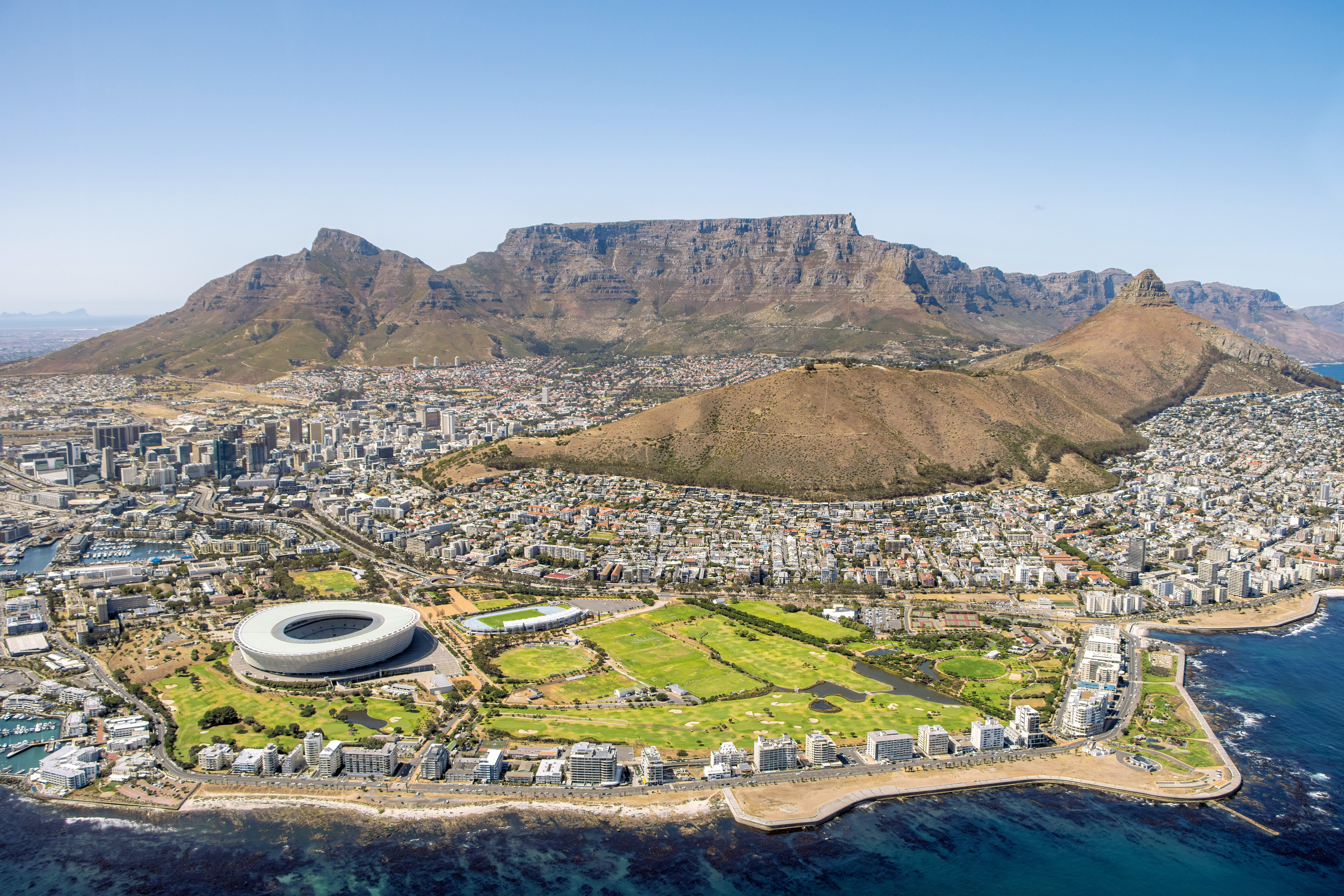
Cape Town, final destination of season 7.

Season 7 of Pechino Express was presented by Costantino della Gherardesca and was broadcast on Rai 2 from September 20 to November 22, 2018. The subtitle of the season was Avventura in Africa (Adventure in Africa) and it was the first (and so far only) season in Africa. The route started in Morocco, at the Detroit Palace in Tangier, and continued through Tanzania and South Africa, at the St. John's Church in Cape Town. The winners of the season were TV presenters Patrizia Rossetti and Maria Teresa Ruta, Le signore della TV (The ladies of TV).

Route

Leg	Country	Departure	Intermediate stop	Arrival	Distance
1	Morocco	Tangier	Azrou	Midelt	549 km
2	Morocco	Midelt	Merzouga	Skoura	491 km
3	Morocco	Ouarzazate	Marrakesh	Oualidia	394 km
4	Morocco	Oualidia	El Jadida	Casablanca	220 km
4	Tanzania	Moshi	-	Swala Boma	48 km
5	Tanzania	Fuka	Mto wa Mbu	Babati	323 km
6	Tanzania	Babati	Katesh	Dodoma	278 km
7	Tanzania	Dodoma	Morogoro	Dar es Salaam	515 km
8	Tanzania	Stone Town	Nungwi	Stone Town	266 km
T	Zanzibar - Tsitsikamma				3 172 km (in beeline)
9	South Africa	Tsitsikamma	Oudtshoorn	Cape Agulhas	623 km
10	South Africa	Paarl	Cape Town	Cape Town	171 km
Total					ca. 15 000 km

Contestants

Place	Couple	Members	Status
1	Le signore della TV (The ladies of TV)	Patrizia Rossetti & Maria Teresa Ruta	Winners
2	Gli scoppiati (The depaired)	Fabrizio Colica & Tommy Kuti	Runners-up
3	Le mannequin (The models)	Linda Morselli & Rachele Fogar	Eliminated (leg 10)
4	I surfisti (The surfers)	Francisco Porcella & Andrea Montovoli	Eliminated (leg 9)
5	Le Sare (The Saras)	Sara Ventura & Sara Balivo	Eliminated (leg 8)
6	I ridanciani (The jovial)	Paola Caruso & Tommaso Zorzi	Withdrawn (leg 8)
7	Gli alieni (The aliens)	Roberto Meloni & Simone Morandi	Eliminated (leg 7)
8	I promessi sposi (The betrothed)	Roberta Giarrusso & Riccardo Di Pasquale	Eliminated (leg 5)
9	I mattutini (The morning ones)	Adriana Volpe & Marcello Cirillo	Eliminated (leg 4)
10	I poeti (The poeticians)	Mirko Frezza & Tommy Kuti	Withdrawn (leg 1)
11	Le Coliche (The Colics)	Claudio Colica & Fabrizio Colica	Withdrawn (leg 1)

== Season 8: Pechino Express - Le stagioni dell'Oriente (2020) ==
Visited countries: Thailand - China - South Korea

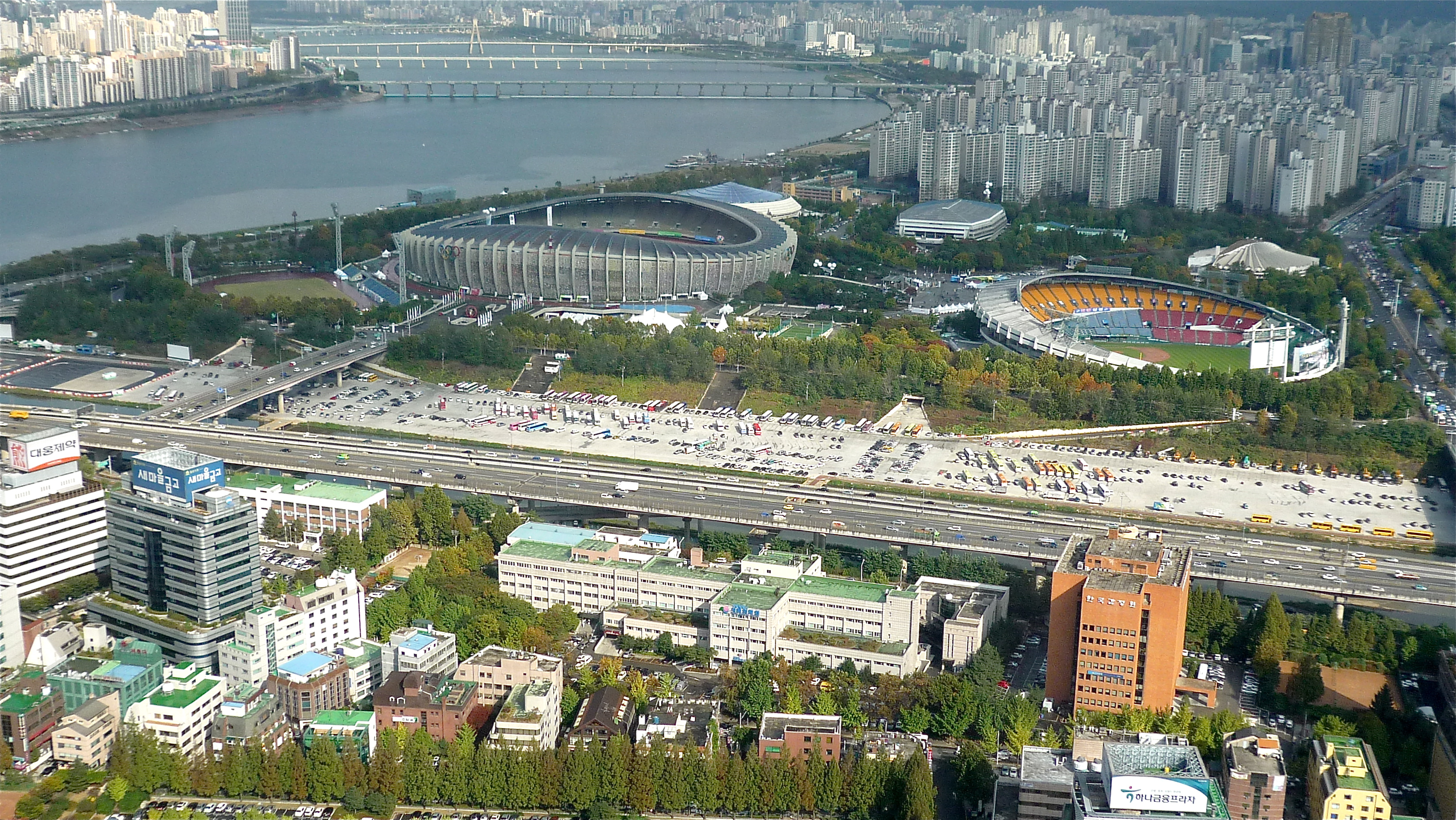
The Seoul Olympic Park, final destination of season 8.

Season 8 of Pechino Express was presented by Costantino della Gherardesca and was broadcast on Rai 2 from February 11 to April 14, 2020. The subtitle of the season was Le stagioni dell'Oriente (The seasons of the East) and the show was back to Asia. The route started in Thailand, at the Golden Buddha Beach on the Ko Phra Thong island, and continued through China and South Korea, finishing at the Olympic Park in Seoul. For the first time ever, the race went through countries that had been visited in previous seasons: Thailand in season 2 and China in season 1. The winners of the season were web personalities Nicole Rossi and Jennifer Poni, Le collegiali (The boarders).

Route

Leg	Country	Departure	Intermediate stop		Arrival	Distance
1	Thailand	Ko Phra Thong	Thamma Park		Surat Thani	277 km
2	Thailand	Surat Thani	Prachuap Khiri Khan		Hua Hin	486 km
3	Thailand	Hua Hin	Nam Tok		Bangkok	532 km
4	Thailand	Bangkok	Bangkok		Bangkok	25 km
T	Bangkok - Dali					1 316 km (in beeline)
5	China	Dali	Shilin		Shitouzhai	556 km
6	China	Kaili	Basha		Longsheng	456 km
7	China	Dongchashan	Yangshuo		Wuzhou	384 km
8	China	Wuzhou	Zhaoqing	Guangzhou	Shenzhen	395 km
T	Shenzhen - Busan					2 015 km (in beeline)
9	South Korea	Busan	Namwon		Muju	352 km
10	South Korea	Suwon	Seoul		Seoul	84 km
Total						ca. 7 000 km

Contestants

Place	Couple	Members	Status
1	Le collegiali (The boarders)	Nicole Rossi & Jennifer Poni	Winners
2	I wedding planner (The wedding planners)	Enzo Miccio & Carolina Giannuzzi	Runners-up
3	Le top (The best)	Dayane Mello & Ema Kovač	Eliminated (leg 10)
4	I gladiatori (The gladiators)	Max Giusti & Marco Mazzocchi	Eliminated (leg 9)
5	Mamma e figlia (Mum and daughter)	Soleil Sorge & Wendy Kay	Eliminated (leg 7)
6	I sopravvissuti (The survivors)	Gennaro Lillio & Vera Gemma	Eliminated (leg 6)
7	Gli inseparabili (The inseparable)	Valerio Salvatori & Fabrizio Salvatori	Eliminated (leg 4)
8	I palermitani (The Palermitans)	Annandrea Vitrano & Claudio Casisa	Eliminated (leg 3)
9	I guaglioni (The boys)	Gennaro Lillio & Luciano Punzo	Eliminated (leg 2)
10	Le figlie d'arte (The daughters of artists)	Asia Argento & Vera Gemma	Withdrawn (leg 2)
11	Padre e figlia (Father and daughter)	Marco Berry & Ludovica Marchisio	Eliminated (leg 1)

== Season 9: Pechino Express - La rotta dei sultani (2022) ==
Visited countries: Turkey - Uzbekistan - Jordan - United Arab Emirates

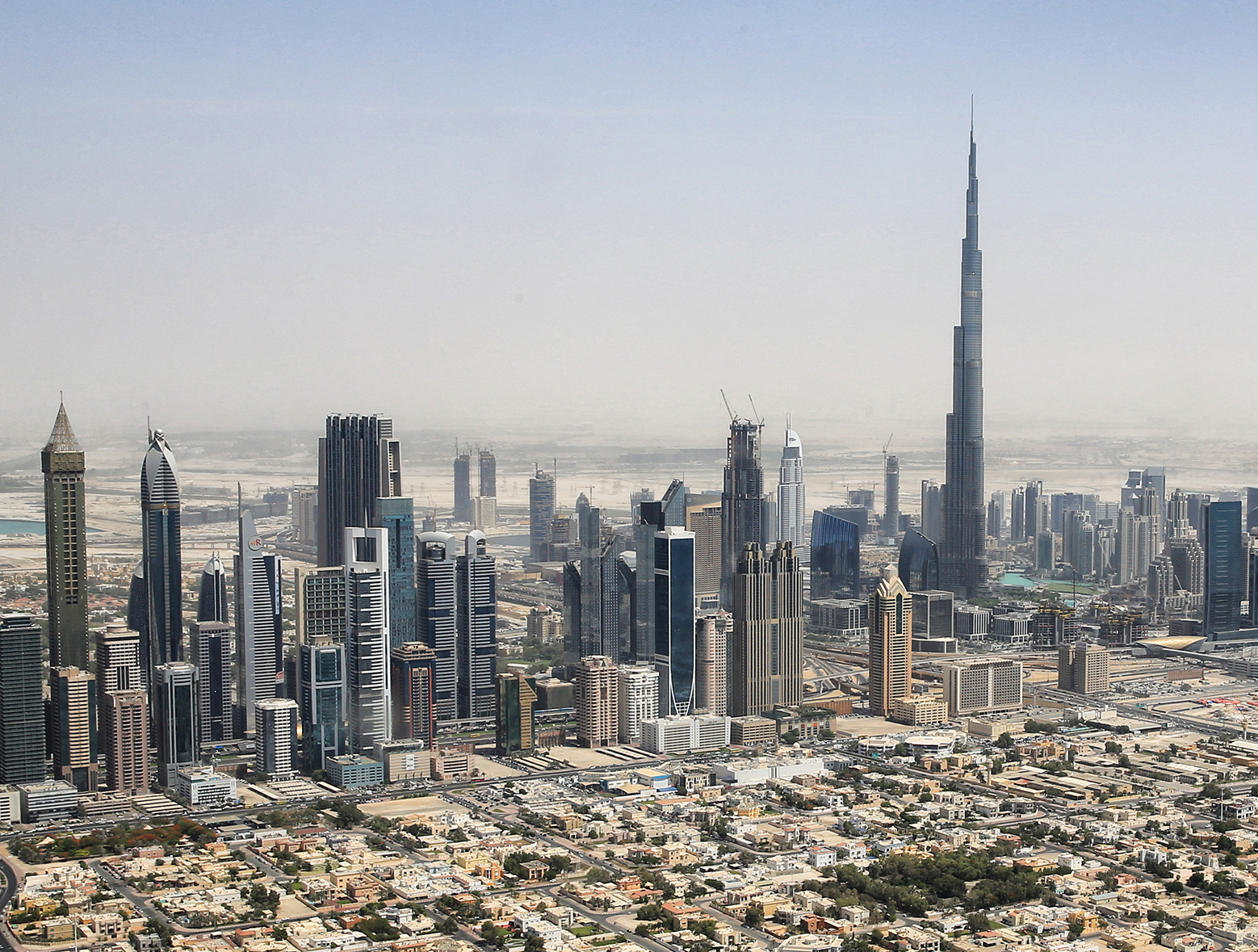
Dubai, final destination of season 9.

Season 9 of Pechino Express was presented by Costantino della Gherardesca together with Enzo Miccio and was broadcast for the first time on Sky Uno and Now from March 10 to May 12, 2022. The subtitle of the season was La rotta dei sultani (The route of the sultans) and the route started in Turkey, at the Uçhisar castle, and continued through Uzbekistan, Jordan and the United Arab Emirates, finishing at the Grand Hotel in Dubai. The winners of the season were TV presenter Victoria Cabello and her friend Paride Vitale, I pazzeschi (The incredible).

Route

Leg	Country	Departure	Intermediate stop		Arrival	Distance
1	Turkey	Uçhisar	Mazı		Sultanhani	226 km
2	Turkey	Konya	Eğirdir		Pamukkale	446 km
3	Turkey	Pamukkale	Belevi		Ayvalık	399 km
4	Turkey	Istanbul	Istanbul		Istanbul	103 km
T	Istanbul – Ayaz-Kala					2 655 km (in beeline)
5	Uzbekistan	Ayaz-Kala	Khiva		Khiva	100 km
6	Uzbekistan	Bukhara	Samarkand		Tashkent	643 km
T	Tashkent – Aqaba					3 335 km (in beeline)
7	Jordan	Aqaba	Aqaba		Petra	253 km
8	Jordan	Petra	Al-Karak		Amman	287 km
T	Amman – Ras Al Khaimah					2 060 km (in beeline)
9	United Arab Emirates	Ras Al Khaimah	Al Ain	Abu Dhabi	Abu Dhabi	493 km
10	United Arab Emirates	Dubai	Dubai		Dubai	—N/a
Total						ca. 11 000 km

Contestants

Place	Couple	Members	Status
1	I pazzeschi (The incredible)	Victoria Cabello & Paride Vitale	Winners
2	Mamma e figlia (Mum and daughter)	Natasha Stefanenko & Sasha Sabbioni	Runners-up
3	Gli sciacalli (The jackals)	Gianluca "Fru" Colucci & Aurora Leone	Eliminated (leg 10)
4	Italia-Brasile (Italy-Brazil)	Nikita Pelizon & Helena Prestes	Eliminated (leg 9)
5	Gli indipendenti (The independent)	Bugo & Cristian Dondoni	Eliminated (leg 8)
6	I fidanzatini (The sweethearts)	Rita Rusić & Cristiano Di Luzio	Eliminated (leg 6)
7	Gli scienziati (The scientists)	Barbascura X & Andrea Boscherini	Eliminated (leg 5)
8	Padre e figlio (Father and son)	Ciro & Giovanbattista Ferrara	Eliminated (leg 4)
9	Gli atletici (The athletic)	Alex Schwazer & Bruno Fabbri	Eliminated (leg 2)
10	Le tiktoker (The tiktokers)	Anna Ciati & Giulia Paglianiti	Eliminated (leg 1)

== Season 10: Pechino Express - La via delle Indie (2023) ==
Visited countries: India - Malaysia - Cambodia

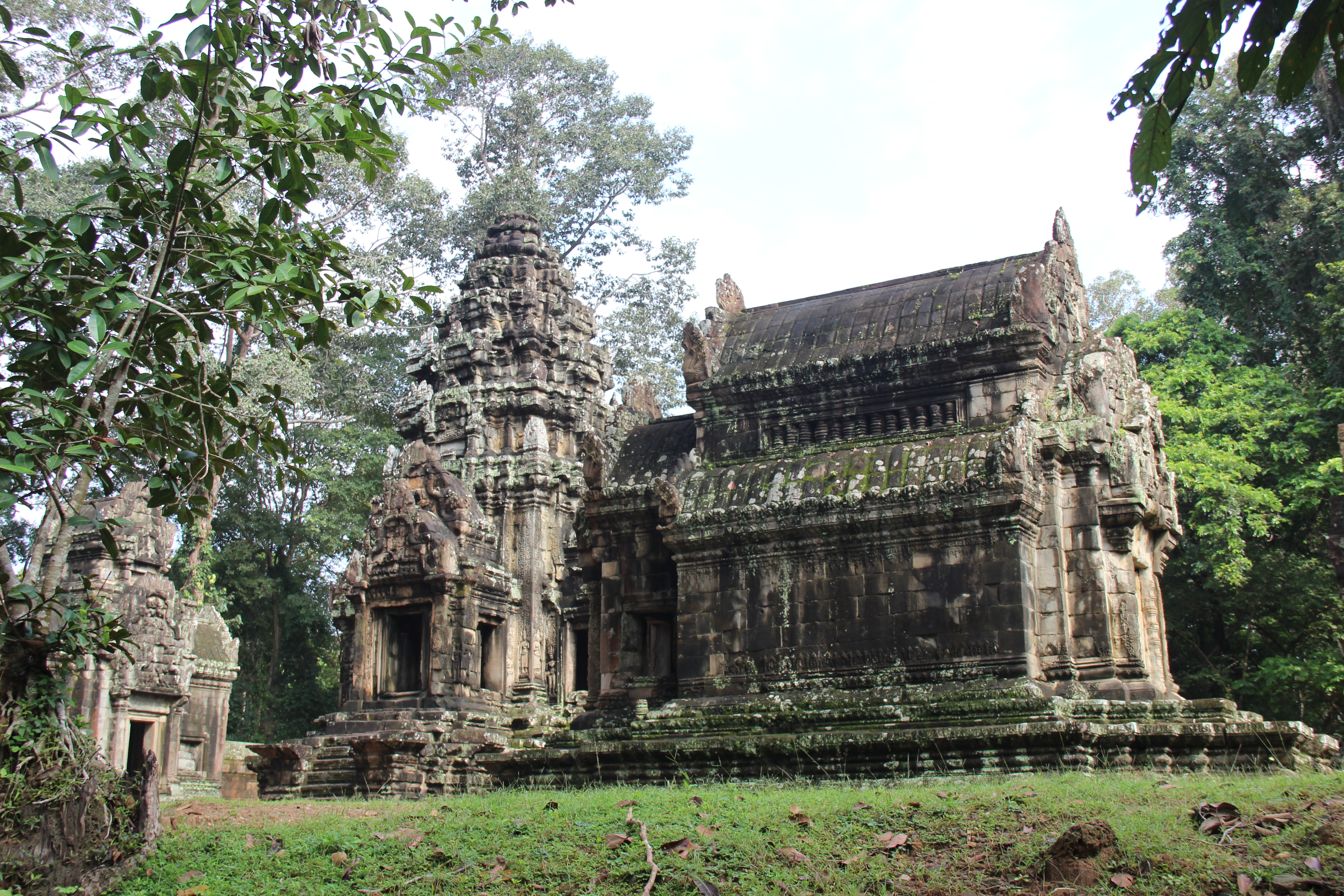
The Thommanon temple in Angkor, final destination of season 10.

Season 10 of Pechino Express was presented by Costantino della Gherardesca together with Enzo Miccio and was broadcast on Sky Uno and Now from March 9 to May 11, 2023. The subtitle of the season was La via delle Indie (The route of the Indies) and the route started in India, at the Gateway of India in Mumbai, and continued through Malaysia and Cambodia, finishing at the Thommanon temple in Angkor. For the first time ever, the whole race went through countries that had been visited in different previous seasons: India in season 1, Malaysia in season 3 and Cambodia in season 2. The winners of the season were American restaurateur and TV celebrity Joe Bastianich and restaurateur and TV personality Andrea Belfiore, Gli italoamericani (The Italian Americans).

Route

Leg	Country	Departure	Intermediate stop	Arrival	Distance
1	India	Mumbai	Wai	Satara	372 km
2	India	Kolhapur	Badami	Hampi	435 km
3	India	Hampi	Chitradurga	Mysore	438 km
4	India	Mysore	Thrissur	Kumarakom	504 km
T	Kumarakom - Kampung Giam				3 854 km (in beeline)
5	Malaysia	Kampung Giam	Lubok Antu	Sibu	494 km
6	Malaysia	Sibu	Mukah	Miri	545 km
7	Malaysia	Awat Awat	Mari Mari Cultural Village	Kota Kinabalu	341 km
T	Kota Kinabalu - Phnom Penh				1 380 km (in beeline)
8	Cambodia	Phnom Penh	Phuom Suos Ney	Oudong	386 km
9	Cambodia	Oudong	Kompong Luong	Battambang	349 km
10	Cambodia	Battambang	Siem Reap	Angkor	172 km
Total					ca. 9 270 km

Contestants

Place	Couple	Members	Status
1	Gli italoamericani (The Italian Americans)	Joe Bastianich & Andrea Belfiore	Winners
2	I novelli sposi (The newlyweds)	Federica Pellegrini & Matteo Giunta	Runners-up
3	Le mediterranee (The Mediterraneans)	Carolina Stramare & Barbara Prezja	Eliminated (leg 10)
4	I siculi (The Sicilians)	Salvatore Schillaci & Barbara Lombardo	Eliminated (leg 9)
5	Le attiviste (The activists)	Giorgia Soleri & Federica "Federippi" Fabrizio	Eliminated (leg 8)
6	Mamma e figlio (Mum and son)	Martina Colombari & Achille Costacurta	Eliminated (leg 6)
7	Gli avvocati (The lawyers)	Alessandra De Michelis & Laura Picardi	Eliminated (leg 4)
8	Gli istruiti (The educated)	Maria Rosa Petolicchio & Andrea Di Piero	Eliminated (leg 3)
9	Gli ipocondriaci (The hypochondriacs)	Dario Vergassola & Caterina Vergassola	Eliminated (leg 2)

== Season 11: Pechino Express - La rotta del dragone (2024) ==
Visited countries: Vietnam - Laos - Sri Lanka

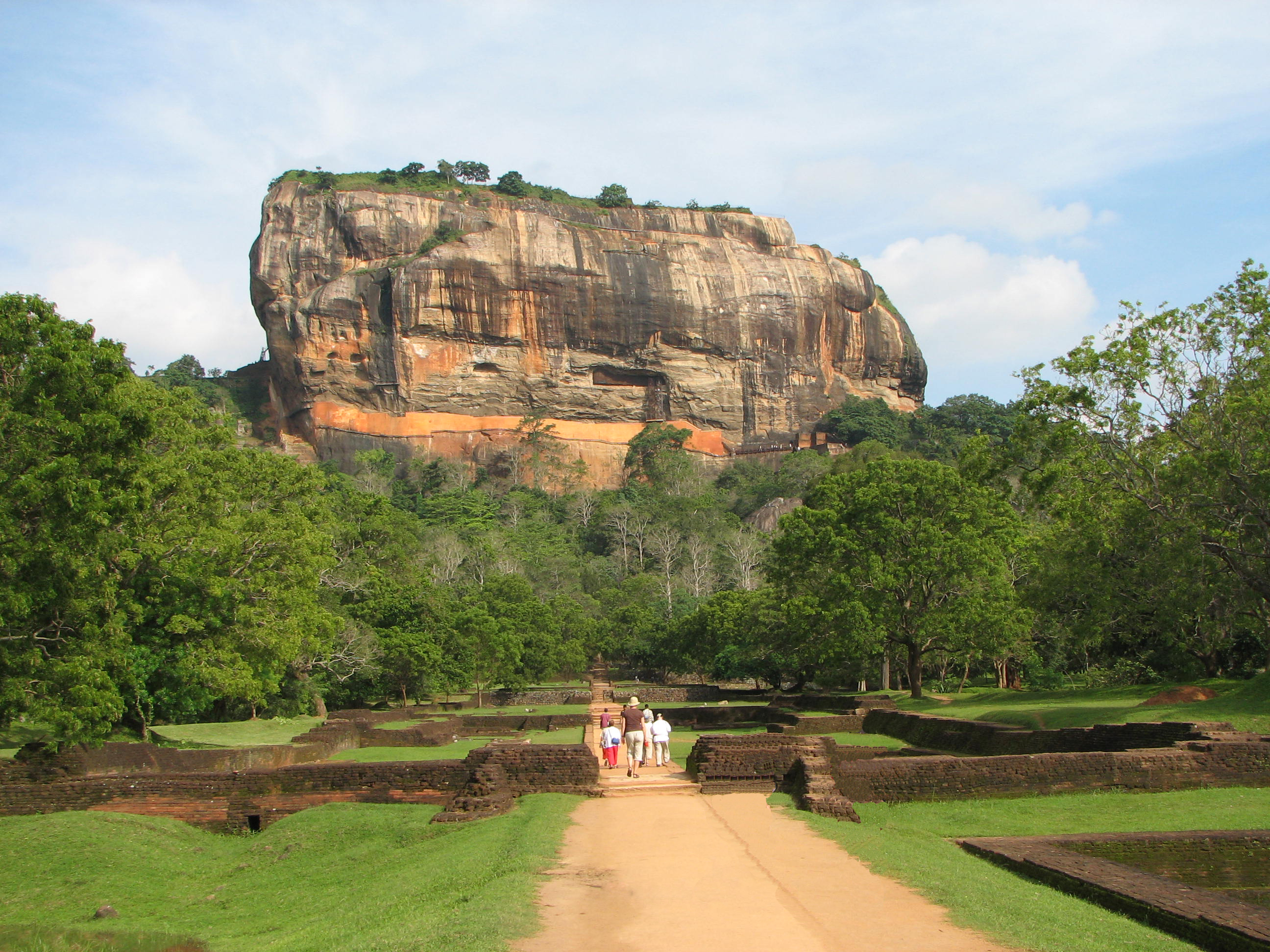
The Sigiriya Rock, final destination of season 11.

Season 11 of Pechino Express was presented by Costantino della Gherardesca together with Gianluca Fru and was broadcast on Sky Uno and Now from March 7 to May 9, 2024. The subtitle of the season was La rotta del dragone (The route of the dragon) and the route started in Vietnam, at the Thai Vi temple in Tam Cốc, and continued through Laos and Sri Lanka, finishing at the Pidurangala Rock in Sigiriya. The winners of the season were pastry chef and TV personality Damiano Carrara and his brother and fellow pastry chef Massimiliano, I pasticceri (The pastry chefs).

Route

Leg	Country	Departure	Intermediate stop		Arrival	Distance
1	Vietnam	Tam Cốc	Hanoi		Lạng Sơn	288 km
2	Vietnam	Lạng Sơn	Phúc Sen		Cao Bằng	180 km
3	Vietnam	Cao Bằng	Cao Kỳ		Lao Cai	526 km
4	Vietnam	Lao Cai	Ta Van	Mường Chà	Điện Biên Phủ	454 km
T	Điện Biên Phủ - Muang Xay					132 km (in beeline)
5	Laos	Muang Xay	Nasiengdy		Luang Prabang	263 km
6	Laos	Luang Prabang	Vang Vieng		Vientiane	420
T	Vientiane - Negombo					2 743 km (in beeline)
7	Sri Lanka	Negombo	Ambalangoda		Galle	170 km
8	Sri Lanka	Galle	Udawalawa		Kandy	387 km
9	Sri Lanka	Kandy	Polonnaruwa		Mihintale	233 km
10	Sri Lanka	Anuradhapura	Dambulla		Sigiriya	119 km
Total						ca. 5 915 km

Contestants

Place	Couple	Members	Status
1	I pasticceri (The pastry chefs)	Damiano Carrara & Massimiliano Carrara	Winners
2	Italia Argentina (Italy Argentina)	Antonella Fiordelisi & Estefanía Bernal	Runners-up
3	Le amiche (The friends)	Maddalena Corvaglia & Barbara Petrillo	Eliminated (leg 10)
4	Le ballerine (The dancers)	Maddalena Svevi & Megan Ria	Eliminated (leg 9)
5	I fratm (The best friends)	Artem Tkachuk & Antonio Orefice	Eliminated (leg 8)
6	I Caressa (The Caressas)	Fabio & Eleonora Caressa	Eliminated (leg 6)
7	I giganti (The giants)	Kristian Ghedina & Francesca Piccinini	Eliminated (leg 5)
8	I brillanti (The brilliant)	Nancy Brilli & Pierluigi Iorio	Eliminated (leg 4)
9	I romagnoli (The Romagnols)	Paolo Cevoli & Elisabetta Garuffi	Eliminated (leg 2)

== Season 12: Pechino Express - Fino al tetto del mondo (2025) ==
Visited countries: Philippines - Thailand - Nepal

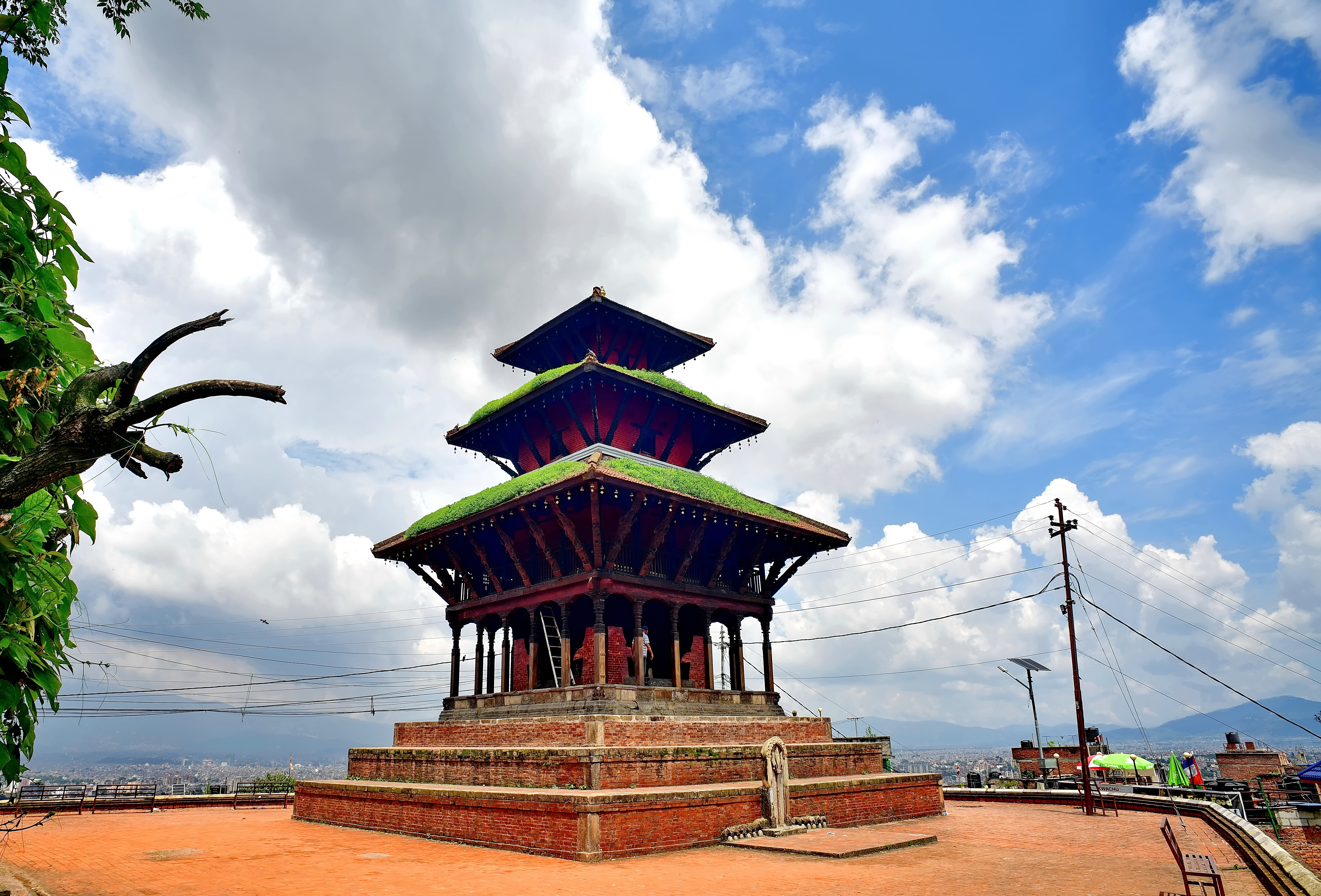
The Uma Maheshwor temple in Kirtipur, final destination of season 12.

Season 12 of Pechino Express was presented by Costantino della Gherardesca together with Gianluca Fru and was broadcast on Sky Uno and Now from March 6 to May 8, 2025. The subtitle of the season was Fino al tetto del mondo (Up to the roof of the world) and the route started in the Philippines, on the Pinagbuyatan Island, and continued through Thailand and Nepal, finishing at the Uma Maheshwor temple in Kirtipur. The winners of the season were retired gymnast Jury Chechi and retired sprint canoer Antonio Rossi, I medagliati (The medalists).

Route

Leg	Country	Departure	Intermediate stop		Arrival	Distance
1	Philippines	Pinagbuyutan Island	Pularaquen		Taytay	140 km
2	Philippines	San Vicente	San Rafael		Sabang	187 km
3	Philippines	Sabang	Puerto Princesa		Puerto Princesa	105 km
T	Puerto Princesa - Khon Kaen					1 903 km (in beeline)
4	Thailand	Khon Kaen	Khao Kho		Phitsanulok	450 km
5	Thailand	Sukhothai	Lampang		Chiang Mai	374 km
6	Thailand	Chiang Mai	Doi Saket	Mae Rim	Tha Ton	233 km
7	Thailand	Tha Ton	Baan Jator		Chiang Rai	228 km
T	Chiang Rai - Kathmandu					1 706 km (in beeline)
8	Nepal	Kathmandu	Pokhara		Pokhara	430 km
9	Nepal	Pokhara	Sauraha		Kathmandu	305 km
10	Nepal	Kathmandu	Kathmandu		Kirtipur	—N/a
Total						ca. 6 061 km

Contestants

Place	Couple	Members	Status
1	I medagliati (The medalists)	Jury Chechi & Antonio Rossi	Winners
2	I complici (The conspiratorial)	Dolcenera & Gigi Campanile	Runners-up
3	Gli estetici (The aesthetic)	Giulio Berruti & Nicolò Maltese	Eliminated (leg 10)
4	Le atlantiche (The atlantic)	Ivana Mrázová & Sofia Giaele De Donà	Eliminated (leg 9)
5	Le sorelle (The sisters)	Samanta & Debora Togni	Eliminated (leg 8)
6	I cineasti (The filmmakers)	Nathalie Guetta & Vito Bucci	Eliminated (leg 7)
7	I magici (The magical)	Jay & Checco Lillo	Eliminated (leg 5)
8	I primi ballerini (The principal dancers)	Virna Toppi & Nicola Del Freo	Eliminated (leg 3)
9	Gli spettacolari (The spectacular)	Gianluca Fubelli & Federica Camba	Eliminated (leg 2)

== Season 13: Pechino Express - L'Estremo Oriente (2026) ==
Visited countries: Indonesia - China - Japan

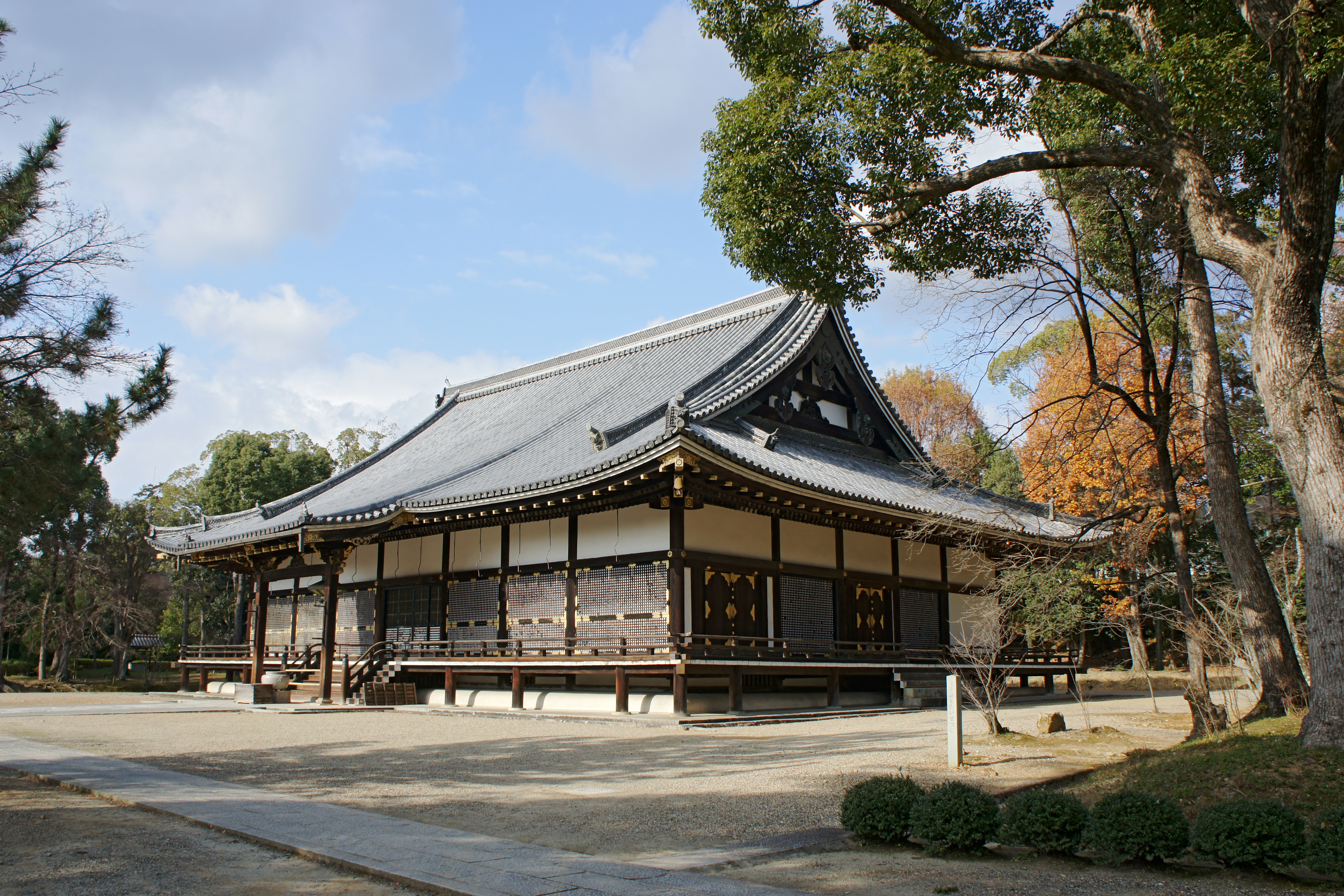
The Ninna-ji temple in Kyoto, final destination of season 13.

Season 13 of Pechino Express was presented by Costantino della Gherardesca together with Lillo in Indonesia, Giulia Salemi in China and Guido Meda in Japan and was broadcast on Sky Uno and Now from March 12 to May 14, 2026. The subtitle of the season was L'Estremo Oriente (The Far East) and the route started in Indonesia, at the Pura Dalem temple in Ubud, on the island of Bali, and continued through China and Japan, finishing at the Ninna-ji temple in Kyoto. The winners of the season were influencer Chanel Totti and her friend Filippo Laurino, I raccomandati (The ones with connections).

Route

Leg	Country	Departure	Intermediate stop	Arrival	Distance
1	Indonesia	Ubud	Mengwi	Gilimanuk	221 km
2	Indonesia	Ketapang	Lumajang	Tumpak Sewu Waterfall	238 km
3	Indonesia	Malang	Mount Bromo	Madiun	329 km
4	Indonesia	Madiun	Surakarta	Yogyakarta	190 km
T	Yogyakarta - Shanghai				4 519 km (in beeline)
5	China	Shanghai	Hangzhou	Yuliang	519 km
6	China	Huizhou	Maren Qifeng	Nanjing	355 km
7	China	Nanjing	Shouchunzhen	Dengfeng	804 km
8	China	Dengfeng	Luoyang	Xi'an	509 km
T	Xi'an - Tokyo				2 795 km (in beeline)
9	Japan	Tokyo	Kuwana	Nara	627 km
10	Japan	Nara	Osaka	Kyoto	167 km
Total					ca. 11 273 km

Contestants

Place	Couple	Members	Status
1	I raccomandati (The ones with connections)	Chanel Totti & Filippo Laurino	Winners
2	Le DJ (The DJs)	Jo Squillo & Michelle Masullo	Runners-up
3	I veloci (The fast)	Fiona May & Patrick Stevens	Eliminated (leg 10)
4	Le albiceleste (The albiceleste)	Camila & Candelaria Solórzano	Eliminated (leg 9)
5	I rapper (The rappers)	Dani Faiv & Tony 2Milli	Eliminated (leg 8)
6	Gli spassusi (The funny)	Biagio Izzo & Francesco Paolantoni	Eliminated (leg 6)
7	Le biondine (The blondies)	Gaia De Laurentiis & Agnese Catalani	Eliminated (leg 5)
8	I comedian (The comedians)	Tay Vines & Assane Diop	Eliminated (leg 4)
9	Gli ex (The exes)	Steven Basalari & Viviana Vizzini	Eliminated (leg 3)
10	I creator (The content creators)	Mattia Stanga & Elisa Maino	Eliminated (leg 2)

== Season 14: Pechino Express - La rotta dei due oceani (2027) ==
Visited countries: Chile - Argentina - Brazil

Season 14 of Pechino Express will be presented by Costantino della Gherardesca and will be broadcast on Sky Uno and Now in the first half of 2027. The subtitle of the season will be La rotta dei due oceani (The route of the two oceans) and the show will go back to America for the first time since 2016 and will change continent after six consecutive seasons in Asia. The route will start in Chile, in Iquique, and will continue through Argentina and Brazil, finishing in Rio de Janeiro.

Route

Leg	Country	Departure	Intermediate stop	Arrival	Distance
1	Chile	Iquique			
2	Chile				
3					
4					
5					
6					
7					
8					
9	Brazil				
10	Brazil			Rio de Janeiro	
Total					ca. km

Contestants

Place	Couple	Members	Status
		Rocco Siffredi & Rózsa Tassi	
		Franceska Nuredini & Ginevra Festa	
		Benji & Fede	
		Alessia Lanza & Andrea Fratino	
		Andrew Howe & Tommaso Marino	
		Cleo Ungarelli & Dani Piccirillo	
		Angela "Bella Fisica" Lin & Alessandro Zhu	
		Danilo da Fiumicino & Alessandro Pieravanti	
		Riccardo De Marco & Maria Bosco	
		Elisabetta & Marzia Gregoraci	

== Ratings ==
Season	Channel	Timeslot	Premiere			Finale			Average	
Season	Channel	Timeslot	Viewers	Share	Source	Viewers	Share	Source	Viewers	Share
1	Rai 2	Thursday 21:10	1.669.000	6.88%		2.418.000	9.12%		2.039.000	7.81%
2	Rai 2	Sunday 21:10 (Premiere) Monday 21:10	1.922.000	9.44%		2.466.000	9.66%		1.955.000	7.92%
3	Rai 2	Sunday 21:10 (Premiere) Monday 21:10	1.876.000	9.57%		2.470.000	9.86%		2.214.500	9.20%
4	Rai 2	Monday 21:10	2.316.000	10.49%		2.501.000	10.21%		2.338.000	9.87%
5	Rai 2	Monday 21:10	2.826.000	13.04%		2.057.000	8.35%		2.086.500	9.00%
6	Rai 2	Wednesday 21:10	1.895.000	8.80%		1.948.000	8.10%		1.831.000	8.04%
7	Rai 2	Thursday 21:10	1.911.000	9.92%		1.331.000	6.30%		1.552.300	7.37%
8	Rai 2	Tuesday 21:20	1.936.000	9.19%		3.045.000	11.50%		2.387.500	9.64%
9	Sky Uno	Thursday 21:15	433.000	1.40%		474.000	2.00%		419.300	1.54%
10	Sky Uno	Thursday 21:15	429.000	1.80%		531.000	2.30%		446.400	1.92%
11	Sky Uno	Thursday 21:15	495.000	2.00%		530.000	2.40%		512.000	2.30%
12	Sky Uno	Thursday 21:15	518.000	2.30%		568.000	2.70%		480.000	2.20%
13	Sky Uno	Thursday 21:15	752.000	3.30%		456.000	2.20%		540.500	2.41%
14	Sky Uno	TBA								

== See also ==
- Peking Express
- Azja Express
- The Amazing Race
