= Enzo Miccio =

Italian television presenter (born 1971)

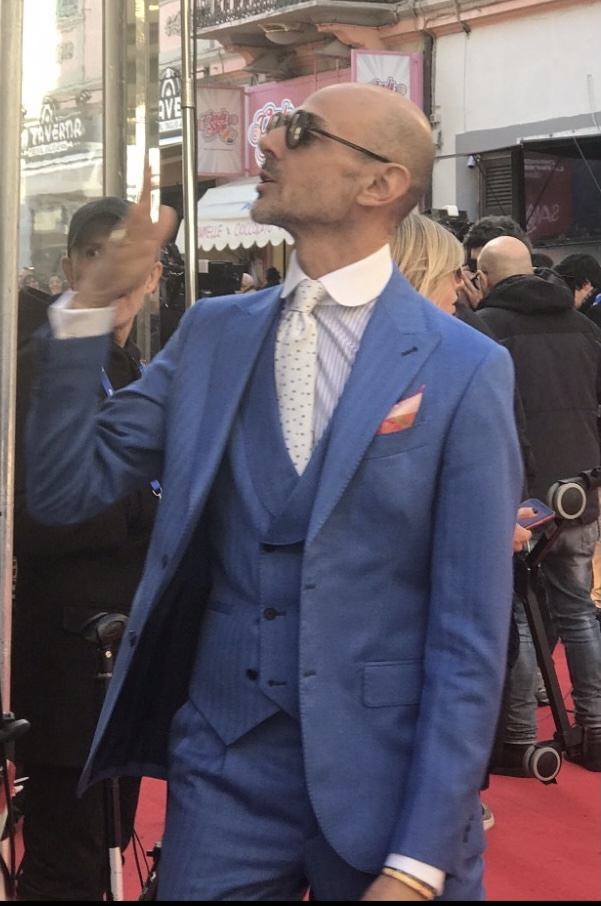
- Miccio at Sanremo in 2020
- Born: 5 May 1971 (age 55); San Giuseppe Vesuviano, Italy
- Occupations: Wedding planner; television personality; fashion stylist
- Years active: 2005–present

Enzo Miccio (pronounced [ˈɛntso ˈmittʃo]; born 5 May 1971) is an Italian television personality, wedding planner, and celebrity fashion stylist, known for his work on Wedding Planners.

== Filmography ==
=== Film ===
Year	Title	Role(s)	Notes
2018	My Big Gay Italian Wedding	Himself	Cameo appearance

=== Television ===
Year	Title	Role(s)	Notes	Ref.
2005–2014	Wedding Planners	Himself / Presenter	Reality show	
2009–2018	Ma come ti vesti?	Himself / Presenter	Reality show; co-hosted with Carla Gozzi	
2011–2015; 2019	Shopping Night	Himself / Presenter	Gamw show; co-hosted with Carla Gozzi	
2011–2012	Mettiamoci all'opera	Himself / Judge	Talent show (season 2)	
2013	L'eleganza del maschio	Himself / Presenter	Reality show	
2014	Ballando con le Stelle	Himself / Contestant	Dance competition show (season 10)	
2014–present	Enzo Missione Spose	Himself / Presenter	Docu-reality series	
2014–2020	Diario di un wedding planner	Himself / Presenter	Wedding Planners spin-off	
2016	Miss Italia	Himself / Judge	Annual beauty contest	
2017	Pequeños gigantes	Himself / Judge	Children's talent show (season 2)	
2018	Royal Wedding: Il matrimonio di Harry e Meghan	Himself / Commentator	Special	
2018	Il matrimonio di Daniele e Filippa: Enzo Miccio wedding planner	Himself / Commentator	Special	
2019	Il matrimonio di Eva ed Imma: Enzo Miccio wedding planner	Himself / Commentator	Special	
2019–2020	Abito da sposa cercasi: Palermo	Himself / Presenter	Reality show	
2020	Pechino Express	Himself / Contestant	Reality/game show (season 8)	
2021	Drag Race Italia	Himself / Guest judge	Episode: "Il giorno più bello"	
2022	Back to School	Himself / Contestant	Game show	
2022	Alessandro Borghese: Celebrity Chef	Himself / Contestant	Episode: "Enzo Miccio vs. Giulia Salemi"	
2022	Cortesie in famiglia	Himself / Mise-en-place judge	Game show	
2022	Trasformazioni incredibili	Himself / Fashion expert	Reality show	
2022–2023	Pechino Express	Himself / Co-host	Reality/game show (season 9-10)	
2025	Radio Italia Live: The Concert!	Himself / Co-host	Annual concert	

== Books ==
- Il matrimonio che vorrei. Progetti di stile ed idee per un giorno indimenticabile. Segrate: Arnoldo Mondadori Editore. 2008. ISBN 9788837061166.
- (with Carla Gozzi) Ma come ti vesti?! Regole, trucchi e suggerimenti per non sbagliare mai il look. Milan: RCS MediaGroup. 2010. ISBN 9788817040839.
- Matrimonio da favola. Stile e sentimento tra sogno e realtà. Milan: RCS MediaGroup. 2011. ISBN 9788817049429.
