= Maria Teresa Ruta =

Italian showgirl and television presenter

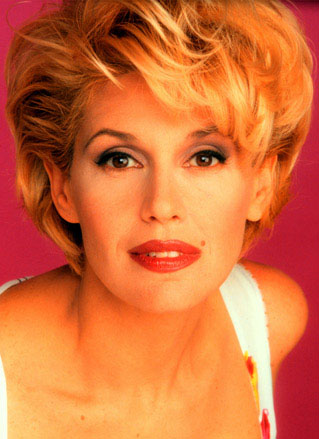
- Ruta in 2000
- Born: 23 April 1960 (age 66); Turin, Italy
- Occupations: Showgirl; television presenter
- Years active: 1979–present
- Spouses: Amedeo Goria (m. 1987; div. 2004) Roberto Zappulla (m. 2015)
- Children: 2

Maria Teresa Ruta (born 23 April 1960) is an Italian television presenter and former showgirl.

== Career ==
Born in Turin, she is the niece of the homonymous Italian television announcer Maria Teresa Ruta. In 1977, aged seventeen, she won the popular Miss Muretto beauty contest (held at the Muretto in Alassio) and began acting in theatre.

In 1981, Ruta debuted on national TV as a showgirl for the RAI working in shows such as Signorine grandi firme with Carmen Russo. Later she became very famous as a sportscaster and presented the famous show La domenica sportiva alongside Sandro Ciotti from 1986 to 1991. Moreover, from 1989 to 1994 she presented the popular children's song competition Zecchino d'Oro alongside Cino Tortorella. In 1992, 1993 and 1997 she was the Italian presenter for Jeux sans frontières. From 1994 to 1996, she presented the most popular Italian morning show, Unomattina, and the game show Sala Giochi.

In 2000, together with Antonella Clerici and Gianfranco Funari, she led the Mediaset talk show A tu per tu but the broadcast had low ratings and it closed after only one season. From the following September she replaced Iva Zanicchi as presenter of the game show OK, il prezzo è giusto!, the Italian version of The Price Is Right.

In 2004, she participated as a contestant in the first edition of the famous reality show L'Isola dei Famosi, finishing in sixth place. In September 2018, she took part, with Patrizia Rossetti, in the seventh season of Pechino Express, the Italian version (aired on Rai 2 and hosted by Costantino della Gherardesca) of the international reality show Peking Express, and in the end the couple won the competition. In September 2020, she participated as a contestant in her third reality show, Grande Fratello VIP, the Italian version of Celebrity Big Brother. She was evicted on 12 February 2021 after spending 148 days in the house.

== Personal life ==
In 1987, Ruta married the journalist Amedeo Goria, with whom she had two children: Guendalina "Guenda" Goria and Gianamedeo Goria. The couple separated in 1999 and divorced in 2004. Since 2006 Maria Teresa Ruta has been romantically linked to the physiotherapist Roberto Zappulla, whom she married in 2015.

She identifies as Roman Catholic.

== Television ==
- Buonasera con Aldo e Carlo Giuffrè (Rete 2, 1981)
- Signorine grandi firme (Rete 3, 1981)
- Musicomio (Rete 3, 1981–1982)
- Gransimpatico (Rai 2, 1983)
- Chewing gum show (Rai 2, 1983)
- Fresco fresco (Rai 1, 1983)
- Caccia al 13 (Rete 4, 1983–1984)
- Sereno Variabile (Rai 2, 1984–1985)
- Calcissimo (Rai 2, 1985)
- Ventimiglia, canzoni tra i fiori (Rai 1, 1985)
- Castrocaro Music Festival (Rai 1, 1985)
- Italia mia (Rai 1, 1986)
- Una canzone per Miss Mondo (Rai 1, 1986)
- Italia sera (Rai 1, 1986–1987)
- La Domenica Sportiva (Rai 1, 1986–1991)
- Le stelle dell'Orsa (Rai 1, 1987)
- Carnevale di Viareggio (Rai 1, 1987)
- A volo d'uccello (Rai 2, 1988)
- Porto Matto (Rai 1, 1988)
- La festa della mamma (Rai 1, 1989)
- Zecchino d'Oro (Rai 1, 1989–1994)
- Hanna e Barbera – 50 anni di carriera (Rai 1, 1989)
- Mare Nostrum – Insieme per l'ambiente (Rai 1, 1989)
- La modella per l'arte (Rai 1, 1990)
- San Valentino – Un anno d'amore (Rai 1, 1990)
- Top '90 (Rai 1, 1990)
- Speciale Sabato dello Zecchino – Libri, televisione e fantasia (Rai 1, 1990)
- Italia...primo amore (Rai 1, 1990)
- Un'estate italiana (Rai 1, 1990)
- Vota la voce (Canale 5, 1990)
- Telethon (Rai 1, 1990–1994)
- Dai lieti calici (Rai 1, 1990)
- 4ª rassegna cinematografica Sangineto (Rai 1, 1991)
- Ciao Italia (Rai 1, 1991)
- Il Processo del Lunedì (Rai 3, 1991–1992)
- Questa pazza pazza neve (Rai 1, 1991–1992)
- Miss Italia (Rai 1, 1991) – Reporter
- Scommettiamo che...? (Rai 1, 1992)
- Giochi senza frontiere (Rai 1, 1992–1993, 1997)
- La grande corsa (Rai 1, 1992)
- Scarpetta d'oro (Rai 2, 1992)
- La notte delle streghe (Rai 1, 1993)
- Trofeo del mare – 3º Primatist Trophy (Rai 2, 1993)
- Uno per tutti (Rai 1, 1993–1994)
- DisneyTime (Rai 1, 1993–1994)
- DisneyTime – Natale con Paperino (Rai 1, 1993)
- Incontri del Mediterraneo (Cinquestelle, 1994)
- 2º Premio giornalistico Pietro Aretino (Rai 1, 1994)
- Canzoni di Primavera – Speciale La Banda dello Zecchino (Rai 1, 1994)
- Tengo famiglia (Odeon 24, 1994)
- Unomattina Estate (Rai 1, 1994, 1995)
- VerdeMattina (Rai 1, 1994)
- Venerdibattito (Rai 1, 1994)
- I Remigini – Speciale La Banda dello Zecchino (Rai 1, 1994)
- Un bambino, una vita (TMC, 1994)
- Sala giochi (Rai 1, 1995)
- Pronto? Sala giochi (Rai 1, 1995–1996)
- Unomattina (Rai 1, 1996)
- Di che segno siamo? – Speciale Unomattina (Rai 1, 1996)
- Giostra di Capodanno (Rai International, 1996)
- Festival di Primavera (Rai 1, 1997)
- Note di Natale (TMC, 1997)
- Vivere bene (Canale 5, 1997–1998)
- Vivere bene – Salute (Canale 5, 1998–1999)
- Vivere bene Estate (Canale 5, 1998)
- Vivere bene – Speciale Medicina (Canale 5, 1998–1999)
- Vivere bene Magazine (Canale 5, 1998–1999)
- Vivere bene con noi (Canale 5, 1999)
- A tu per tu (Canale 5, 2000)
- OK, il prezzo è giusto! (Rete 4, 2000–2001)
- Bravo bravissimo club (Rete 4, 2001–2002)
- Goal Show (Tele A, 2002)
- Quelli che... il Calcio (Rai 2, 2002–2003) – Reporter
- TG Salute (Odeon 24, 2003)
- Unomattina Estate Sabato e domenica (Rai 1, 2003)
- L'Isola dei Famosi (Rai 2, 2003) – Contestant
- Estate sul 2 (Rai 2, 2004)
- Il circo per l'estate (Rete 4, 2005)
- Pomeriggio Cinque (Canale 5, from 2008) – Columnist
- Domenica Win (Betting Channel, 2008–2009)
- Talk show e rubriche (Vero Capri, 2012–2013) – Columnist
- Missione relitti (Acqua, 2014–2018)
- Pechino Express (Rai 2, 2018) – Contestant, winner
- Detto fatto (Rai 2, from 2019) – Columnist
- Chef per Passione (TeleNord, 2019–2020)
- Grande Fratello VIP 5 (Canale 5, 2020–2021) – Contestant

== Filmography ==
- Saturday, Sunday and Friday, directed by Sergio Martino (1979)
- La moglie in vacanza... l'amante in città, directed by Sergio Martino (1980)
- Sciopèn, directed by Luciano Odorisio (1982)
- Giorno dopo giorno – TV soap opera, (1982)
- Il volo di Teo, directed by Walter Santesso (1991)
- Un inviato molto speciale, directed by Vittorio De Sisti – TV series, episode 1x04 (1991)
- Un posto al sole – TV soap opera, (2002)
