= Linda Morselli =

Italian model, television personality and influencer

- Born: November 15, 1988 (age 37); Giussano, Monza and Brianza, Italy
- Occupations: model; television personality; influencer
- Years active: 2006–present
- Partner(s): Fernando Alonso (2016–2021); Benjamín Alfonso (2021–present)
- Modeling information
- Height: 175 cm (5 ft 9 in)
- Hair color: brown
- Eye color: brown

Linda Morselli (born 15 November 1988) is an Italian model, television personality and influencer based in Milan.

== Biography ==
In 2006 Linda Morselli was one of 30 finalists in the Miss Italia and she won the title of Miss Eleganza. For her work she has traveled all over the world. She worked for several leading fashion brands and posed for various photo shoots, editorials, covers and commercials working with internationally renowned photographers.

In 2009 she appeared in the music video for Riaffiora's "French Kiss". In 2010 she appeared in the music video for Marco Carta's "Quello che dai".

In 2017 she worked with Kimoa whose owner is Fernando Alonso.

In 2018, Linda Morselli and her best friend Rachele Fogar competed in the reality television competition show Pechino Express 7 - Avventura in Africa broadcast by Rai 2 in prime time. They came in third place. The two were referred to as "mannequins" on the show. During Pechino Express, with Rachele Fogar, she plays in Il figlio di Spartacus in the role of Rando.

In 2018 Linda Morselli and Rachele Fogar took part in the "White Party" of Atelier Emé.

In 2019 she took part in an episode of Drive Up, a television program broadcast by Italia 1; and, during the Christmas time, with Rachele Fogar, they visited and explored Alta Badia (practicing skiing and snowboarding) and saw the 2019–20 FIS Alpine Ski World Cup.

In 2020 she and Fogar appeared in the TV series Casa Marcello hosted by Marcello Cirillo; they visited and explored Sicily in a tour they nicknamed "Sicilia Express".

In 2020 she had a small role in the Spanish film The Paramedic directed by Carles Torras and in 2021 she had a role in the Italian film Rido perchè ti amo, directed by Paolo Ruffini.

In 2022 Linda Morselli and Rachele Fogar participated in the experiences in "The Island Festival", an experiential festival in Pantelleria.

== Personal life ==
Linda enjoys physical activities including snowboarding, skiing and yoga (including Bikram Yoga). Since 2021 she has been in a relationship with Benjamín Alfonso. Linda was previously in a relationship with Fernando Alonso from 2016 to 2021 and with Valentino Rossi from 2011 to 2016. Her best friend is Rachele Fogar (daughter of Ambrogio Fogar), with whom she often works together.

== Filmography ==
- The Paramedic, directed by Carles Torras (2020)
- Rido perché ti amo, directed by Paolo Ruffini (2021)

== Television ==
- Miss Italia (Rai 1, 2006)
- Pechino Express 7 - Avventura in Africa (Rai 2, 2018)
- Drive Up - 03x08 (Italia 1, 2019)
- Casa Marcello (Teleuniverso/Telemia/Brixia Channel/Calabria Sona, 2020)

== Web television ==
- Casa Marcello (2020)
