= Resta con me =

2026 single by Bambole di pezza

Single by Bambole di pezza
- Language: Italian
- Released: 25 February 2026
- Genre: Pop rock; punk rock
- Length: 3:10
- Label: EMI Records
- Composers: Caterina Alessandra Dolci; Federica Rossi; Daniela Piccirillo; Francesco Tarducci; Simone Borrelli; Andrea Spigaroli
- Lyricists: Martina Ungarelli; Lisa Cerri; Francesco Tarducci; Andrea Spigaroli
- Producer: Andrea Blanc

Music video
- "Resta con me" on YouTube

"Resta con me" is a song by Italian band Bambole di pezza, released on 25 February 2026.

== Background and release ==
On 30 November 2025, Bambole di pezza were announced among the participants of the Sanremo Music Festival 2026, with the title of their competing entry revealed the following 14 December. The song was released during the festival on 25 February 2026.

The song was written by eight authors, including the five band members Martina “Cleo” Ungarelli, Caterina Alessandra “Kaj” Dolci, Lisa “Morgana Blue” Cerri, Federica “Xina” Rossi e Daniela “Dani” Piccirillo. Other authors are Francesco Tarducci, Simone Borrelli e Andrea Spigaroli.

== Music and lyrics ==
"Resta con me" is a rock power ballad. The band described it as "a story of sisterhood, about the value of being together in difficult times". The song is not only autobiographic, but also contains references to the current "times of hatred" and feminist themes. It tells the story of a girl who talks to an ex-boyfriend she hasn't completely forgotten, but seems to want to move on, not caring what others say.

== Charts ==
Chart performance for "Resta con me"
Chart (2026)	Peak position
Italy (FIMI)	15
Italy Airplay (EarOne)	38
