= Benedetta Mazza =

- Born: 22 November 1989 (age 36); Parma
- Height: 1.73 m (5 ft 8 in)
- Beauty pageant titleholder
- Title: Miss Emilia 2008
- Hair color: Blonde
- Eye color: Blue
- Major competition: Miss Italia

Benedetta Mazza (born in Parma on 22 November 1989) is an Italian beauty queen, actress, television presenter, and model, winner of the Miss Italia Emilia 2008 edition.

== Early life and career ==
After the scientific maturity obtained at the Giacomo Ulivi high school in Parma, she attended the fashion course at the Istituto Europeo di Design in Milan for a year, before leaving her studies. In 2008, Benedetta Mazza was noticed by the Miss Italia regional selector, who encouraged her to participate in the beauty contest. She is thus elected Miss Liceo Parma, Miss Parma, Miss Cinema Emilia Romagna, and Miss Emilia. She thus participates in Miss Italia 2008, finishing fifth. After the competition, she poses for Just Simpa's charity calendar, in support of the Associazione Volontari dell'Ospedale dei Bambini, and gets a small part in Federico Moccia's film Amore 14. From 7 September 2009 to 11 June 2011 she is one of the four "professors" of the program L'eredità, together with Enrica Pintore, Cristina Buccino and Serena Gualinetti. In 2010, she is the godmother of the Women's Six Nations Championship tournament in Noceto, she participates as a mysterious character in an episode of the game Identity, as well as being the testimonial of the clothing and accessories of brands Bfly and Gang Cavaliere. Starting from 23 April 2012, she leads the broadcast La TV Ribelle on Rai Gulp, alongside Mario Acampa, and in the same year she appears on the pages of the weekly Intimità in the section dedicated to fashion and plays Chantal, the assistant of Rocco Siffredi, in an episode of I Cesaroni. Since November 2012 she again hosted the television program Gulp Girl on Rai Gulp, also broadcast in subsequent television seasons until February 2016. In the spring of 2013, she hosted two special prime-time episodes of the Zecchino d'Oro on Rai YoYo: March 19 Festa del papà and May 13 La festa della mamma.

In September 2016, she returned to television after 5 years of work on digital channels because she participated as a competitor, paired with Raffaella Modugno, in the fifth edition of Pechino Express, broadcast on Rai 2. In the autumn of 2017, she returned to Rai 1 as a competitor in the seventh edition of the Tale e quale show.

In 2018, she was an official competitor of the third edition of the reality show Grande Fratello VIP, hosted by Ilary Blasi on Canale 5, where she arrived at the final evening, finishing in sixth place.

== Filmography ==
=== Film ===
- Amore 14, directed by Federico Moccia (2009)
- Loro, directed by Paolo Sorrentino (2018)

=== Television ===
- I Cesaroni – TV series, episode 5x19 (2012)

=== Videoclip ===
- Meteorite directed by Alessandro Costa & Stratodasser feat. Mario (2016)
- Secchione Is The New Figo directed by Lorenzo Baglioni (2019)
