= Federica Nargi =

Italian model and television presenter

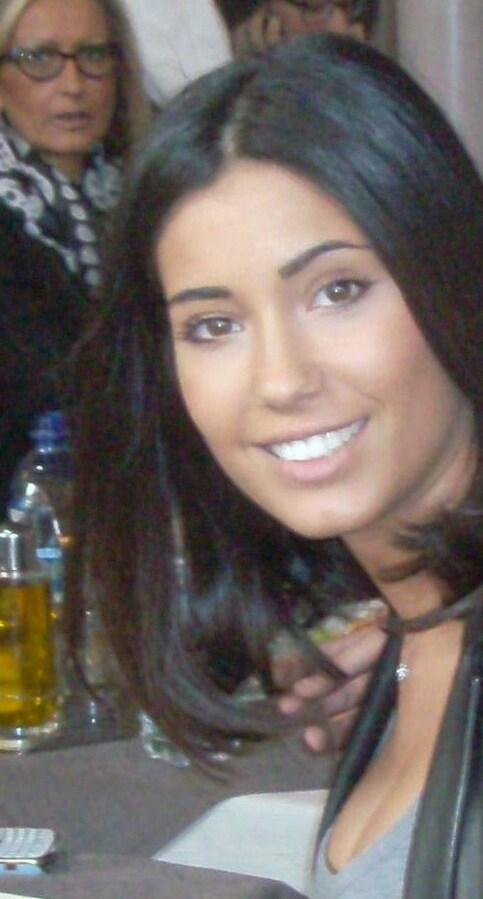
- Federica Nargi in 2012
- Born: 5 February 1990 (age 36); Rome, Italy
- Occupations: Model; showgirl; television presenter; actress
- Modelling information
- Height: 177 cm (5 ft 10 in)
- Hair colour: Brown
- Eye colour: Brown

Federica Nargi (born 5 February 1990, in Rome) is an Italian model, showgirl, television presenter, actress and social media influencer.

== Biography ==
=== Early life-2007 ===
Nargi was born in Rome from Claudio and Concetta, originally from Boscoreale. After having attended a dance school since childhood and having participated in various beauty contests, in 2007 Nargi ranked 11th in the final of Miss Italia after winning the 1st prize of Miss Roma and then the national title of Miss Cotonella.

=== 2008-2014 ===
In the summer of 2008 Nargi participated, in the category of more, in Veline on Canale 5 and won the final of 18 September 2008 paired with the blonde Costanza Caracciolo: the two veline showgirls were on Striscia la notizia for four consecutive editions from 22 September 2008 to 10 June 2012; in the seasons 2010-2011 and 2011-2012 the veline couple presented Le nuove mostre, a comedy show of La5 designed by Antonio Ricci. In the summer of 2011, Nargi debuted at the cinema reciting in the film by Massimo Morini Capitan Basilico 2 - I Fantastici 4+4.

In the summer of 2012, Nargi became a model and testimonial of the Koralline fashion house for the two advertising campaigns of the "autumn-winter 2012-2013 season". In the autumn of 2012 Nargi took part in the first edition of the Rai 2 reality show Pechino Express as the "Le Veline" tandem team together with Costanza Caracciolo. In December 2012 Nargi was paired with Costanza Caracciolo as one of the competitors of the culinary talent show Cuochi e Fiamme Celebrities aired on LA7d and conducted by Simone Rugiati. In the winter of 2013, Nargi became a model and testimonial of the Koralline fashion house for the advertising campaigns of the "spring season 2013", and was one of the vip competitors of the Rai 1 game show Red or Black? - Tutto o niente and became, together with Costanza Caracciolo and Francesca Fioretti, one of the testimonials for a line of bags from the Yamamay fashion house. In spring 2013 Nargi was a model and testimonial of the Golden Point fashion house for the advertising campaigns of the "summer season 2013", and participated, together with Melissa Satta, at Italia 1's Forever Together Summer Show as model of Calzedonia and presented, together with Paolo Ruffini and Fiammetta Cicogna, the comedy series Colorado ... a rotazione! also broadcast on Italia 1; later the Ruffini-Nargi duo presented, with Gianluca Fubelli (an Italian comedian and actor best known as Scintilla), the 19th season of Colorado in the autumn of 2017 (the last episode of this season was aired on 4 January 2018) on Italia 1. In June 2013 she filed at the Glamour Live Show in Milan for the Hip Hop, Tèr de Caractère and Golden Point collections, three fashion houses of which she was a model and testimonial together with Alessia Tedeschi; always for Golden Point, she was the protagonist of the "sea catalogues" of summer 2013 and of the catalogues of the "autumn-winter 2013-2014 season". In September 2013 she conducted the Rai 2 show Facciamo pace together with Niccolò Torielli. In November 2013 Nargi made his debut at the theatre because she played, alongside Roberta Giarrusso and Gabriele Cirilli, in the show Lui e Lei - Istruzioni per la coppia directed by Federico Moccia. In spring 2014 Nargi was one of the competitors of the first edition of Rai 1's talent show Si può fare! in which she obtained the second place. After taking part in the 2013 shoot of the music video Heroes by Ben Dj, in January 2015 she was the protagonist of the music video Il bello d'esser brutti by J-Ax.

=== 2015 ===
Between winter and spring 2015, Nargi became, together with Irene Colzi and Annalisa Scarrone, a model and testimonial of Irene Greco's The Secret Beauty hair products line and later Nargi became a model and witness for Garnier. After marching for Goldenpoint's "Beachwear Line 2015", Nargi in the summer of 2015 became a model and testimonial of "SiSi Beachwear Collection 2015 for Goldenpoint", "GoldenLady Beachwear Collection 2015 for Goldenpoint" and "Philippe Matignon Beachwear Collection 2015 by Goldenpoint".

In May 2015, Nargi became a model and testimonial of the Goldenpoint Swimwear costumes. Also in May 2015 Nargi became a model and testimonial for the Goldenpoint Bikini costumes (previously Nargi had already posed for the same company, precisely for the intimate Goldenpoint Fall-Winter 2013-14).

In September 2015 she became a model and testimonial of the Follow Us clothing line (for this line Nargi had already posed in 2014). Also in September 2015 she took part in the 1st edition of the comedy prime time programme Stasera tutto è possibile conducted on Rai 2 by Amadeus. In the 2015-16 season, Nargi was the host of Premium Magazine, a television rotogravure adapted for the digital channels of Mediaset Premium, similar to the most famous Verissimo. In 2016, with Adua Del Vesco and Claudia Cardinale, Nargi took part in the fiction of Canale 5's Il bello delle donne... alcuni anni dopo with the role of Scilla Manfridi: the fiction directed by Eros Puglielli was aired in the Canale 5's prime time in 2017 between January and March. In the autumn of 2015 Nargi became the testimonial and model of the "Goldenpoint & HUE 2015/2016" pantyhose collection.

In the summer and also in the autumn of 2015,

=== 2016 ===
Nargi became a model and testimonial of the FW15 collection of Follow Us, so in January 2016 she represented this brand at Pitti Uomo. After posing for the cover of Lampoon Magazine, in the spring of 2016 Nargi became a model and testimonial (instead of Elena Santarelli) for Sandro Ferrone's spring / summer 2016 collection; in the same period she became a model and testimonial of the SS16 collection of Follow Us and then Nargi together with Alessandro Matri posed as testimonials for the U.S. Polo Assn. the spring-summer of 2016 collection of clothes.

=== 2017 ===
In the winter of 2017, Nargi represented the Mizuno clothing brand at Pitti Uomo and in the same time she became a model and testimonial for the television advertising campaign of Samsung's WindFree air conditioners. After having participated (together with Alessandro Matri) in the talk-variety show E poi c'è Cattelan conducted by Alessandro Cattelan in the late night of Sky Uno, in the spring of 2017 Nargi became a model and testimonial of Hino cosmetics and participated, along with Moreno and Alessia Macari, at the music game show Bring the Noise conducted by Alvin on Italia 1; in the same period Nargi became a model and testimonial for the Supertokio clothing brand. In October 2017 Nargi participated as a guest star in the Italia 1 programme Big Show conducted by Andrea Pucci.

=== 2018 ===
In February 2018 Nargi became the new model and testimonial, replacing Belén Rodríguez, of the Foreyever glasses.

== Personal life ==
Federica Nargi since March 2009 is engaged to the Italian footballer Alessandro Matri, with whom she had two daughters named Sofia Matri (born on 26 September 2016) and Beatrice Matri (born on 16 March 2019).

== Television programmes ==
- Miss Italia 2007 (Rai 1, 2007)
- Veline (Canale 5, 2008)
- Striscia la notizia (Canale 5, 2008–12)
- Le nuove mostre (La5, 2010–12)
- Pechino Express (Rai 2, 2012)
- Red or Black? - Tutto o niente (Rai 1, 2013)
- Forever Together Summer Show (Italia 1, 2013)
- Colorado ... a rotazione! (Italia 1, 2013)
- Facciamo pace (Rai 2, 2013)
- Si può fare! (Rai 1, 2014)
- Stasera tutto è possibile (Rai 2, 2015)
- Premium Magazine (Mediaset Premium, 2015–16)
- E poi c'è Cattelan (Sky Uno, 2017)
- Bring the Noise (Italia 1, 2017)
- Big Show (Italia 1, 2017)
- Colorado (Italia 1, 2017–18)

== Filmography ==
=== Cinema ===
- Capitan Basilico 2 - I Fantastici 4+4 (2011)
- What's Your Sign? (2014)

=== Television ===
- Il bello delle donne... alcuni anni dopo (Canale 5, 2017)

== Other activities ==
=== Music videos ===
- 2013 – Heroes (Ben Dj)
- 2015 – Il bello d'esser brutti (J-Ax)

=== Advertising ===
- Koralline (2012–13)
- Yamamay bag (2013)
- Goldenpoint (2013–16)
- Follow us (2014–16)
- Garnier (2015)
- Sandro Ferrone P/E (2016)
- U.S. Polo Assn P/E (2016)
- Supertokyo (2016)
- Hino (2017)
- Foreyever (2018)
- Primadonna P/E (2018)
- Netflix (2018) - with Alessandro Matri

=== Theatre ===
- Lui e lei - Istruzioni per la coppia (2013)
