= Giulia Salemi =

Italian televisión presenter and model

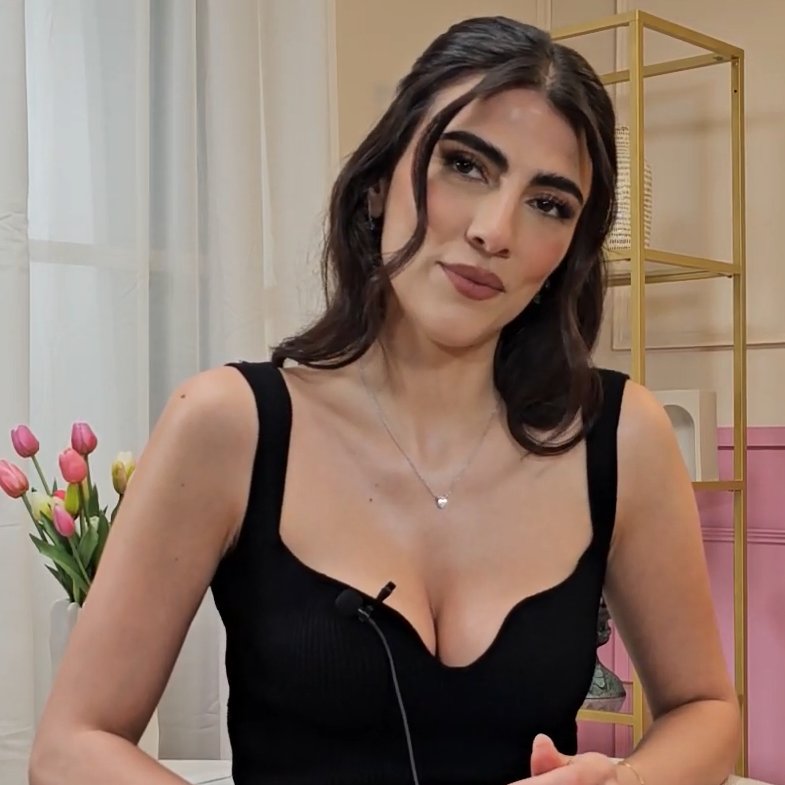
- Giulia Salemi in 2024
- Born: 1 April 1993 (age 33); Piacenza, Emilia-Romagna, Italy
- Occupations: Television presenter; model
- Years active: 2012–present
- Partner: Pierpaolo Pretelli

Giulia Salemi (born 1 April 1993) is an Italian television presenter and model.

== Early life ==
She was born in Piacenza to Italian policeman Mario Salemi and Iranian beautician Fariba Tehrani, who separated in 2009. She studied at the high school of human sciences and pursued a degree in Economics at the Università Cattolica del Sacro Cuore, in the Piacenza branch. She was attracted to the entertainment world from a very young age and made her career debut as a model. She later embarked on a career in television, and left her studies after a year.

== Career ==
Salemi's debut television program was in the summer of 2012, when she participated in the fourth edition of Veline. The following year, she competed and won in the reality TV show Sweet Sardinia on La5. On September 14, 2014, she participated in the finals of Miss Italia, where she came in third place. She has won first place in national bands of Miss Sport Lotto and Miss TV Sorrisi e Canzoni. In February 2015, she joined with Simona Ventura in presenting the football talent show Leyton Orient, broadcast on Agon Channel. In the same year, she participated as a competitor, alongside her mother Fariba, in the fourth edition of Pechino Express, finishing in third place.

== Personal life ==
Salemi dated model Francesco Monte, whom she met during the third edition of the reality TV show Grande Fratello VIP; the couple broke off the relationship in the summer of 2019. From December 2020, she developed a relationship with Pierpaolo Pretelli, a model and ex velino of Striscia la notizia, while inside the house of Big Brother VIP in its fifth edition.

== Filmography ==
=== Films ===
| Year | Title | Role | Notes |
|---|---|---|---|
| 2017 | La verità, vi spiego, sull'amore | Cleopatra | Feature film debut |

=== Television ===
| Year | Title | Role | Notes |
|---|---|---|---|
| 2012 | Veline | Herself/ Contestant | Talent show (season 4) |
| 2013 | Sweet Sardinia | Herself/ Contestant | Reality show (season 1) |
| 2014 | Miss Italia 2014 | Herself/ Contestant | Annual beauty contest |
| 2015 | Pechino Express | Herself/ Contestant | Reality show (season 4) |
| 2016 | Milano-Roma | Herself | Episode: "Giancarlo Magalli e Giulia Salemi" |
| 2016–2018 | Sbandati | Herself/ Recurring guest | Variety show |
| 2017 | Ridiculousness Italia | Herself/ Host | Variety/comedy show |
| 2018 | Grande Fratello VIP 3 | Herself/ Contestant | Reality show |
| 2019 | Giù in 60 secondi - Adrenalina ad alta quota | Herself/ Guest | Adventure program (season 5) |
| 2019 | Miss Italia 2019 | Herself/ Judge | Annual beauty contest |
| 2020 | Adoro! | Herself/ Co-host | Web-talk show |
| 2020 | Disconessi on the road | Herself/ Co-host | Docu-reality series |
| 2020–2021 | Grande Fratello VIP 5 | Herself/ Contestant | Reality show |
| 2021 | Salotto Salemi | Herself/ Host | Web-talk show |
| 2021–2022 | GF VIP Party | Herself/ Host | Variety show |
| 2022–2023 | Grande Fratello VIP 7 | Social sent | Reality show |
