= Bambole di pezza =

Italian all-female band

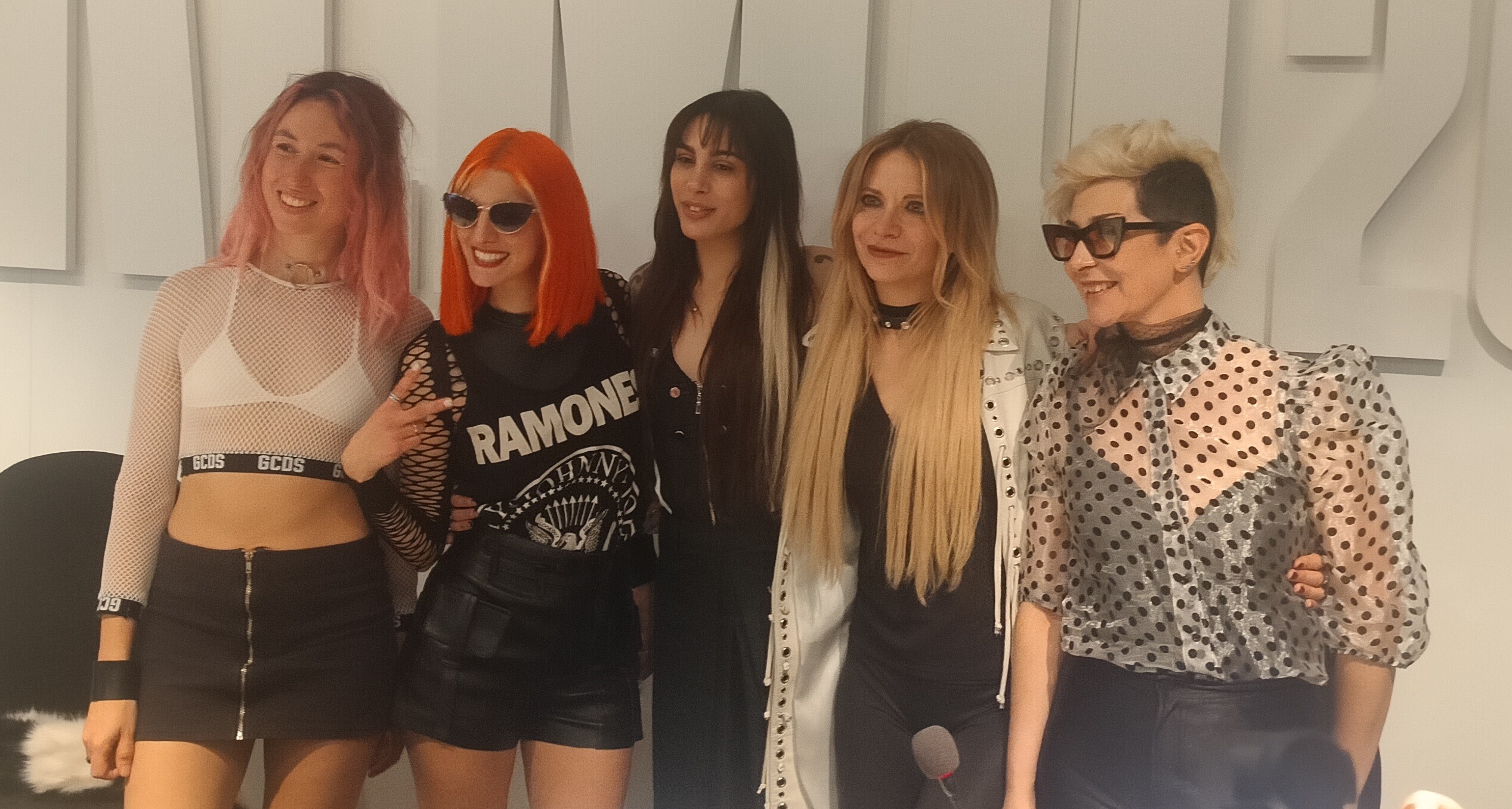
- Bambole di pezza in 2026; L–R: Dolci, Rossi, Ungarelli, Cerri, Piccirillo

Background information
- Origin: Milan, Italy
- Genres: Pop punk; punk rock
- Years active: 2002–2006; 2014; 2021–present
- Labels: Universal; Sony; EMI
- Members: Martina "Cleo" Ungarelli; Daniela "Dani" Piccirillo; Caterina Alessandra "Kaj" Dolci; Lisa "Morgana Blue" Cerri; Federica "Xina" Rossi
- Past members: Aika Ceccarelli; Franka Weird; Micky Paiano; Rox Randisi
- Website: www.bamboledipezza.it

Bambole di pezza (Italian: [ˈbambole di ˈpɛttsa]; English: "Rag Dolls") is an Italian pop punk/punk rock all-female band formed in 2002 in Milan.

They have released five studio albums and perform extensively live. In addition to their musical activities, the band has always been committed to feminist issues, the fight for gender equality, and the fight against gender violence and sexism.

== History ==
=== 2002–2004: Debut and early recordings ===
The band was formed on the initiative of guitarist Lisa Cerri, aka Morgana Blue. In 2002, they signed with Tube Records, with whom they released their debut album, Crash Me. The album featured energetic punk rock inspired by the riot grrrl movement, filtered through a pop sauce inspired by Prozac+, with a wide variety of songs. Two music videos were shot for the singles "Le streghe" and "Rock 'n' Roll" from the album and were played on major Italian music television channels. After the album's release, the band embarked on a long tour, which also saw them supporting the Spanish band Ska-P on their Italian tour, playing in various sports arenas.

Since 2003, the band has performed over 70 live shows a year throughout Italy. Then, in May 2006, the band appeared as guest stars in the Italian series Inspector Coliandro in the episode "The Day of the Wolf" (01x01), playing the part of the band in which Nikita, the main character of the episode, plays, and performing the song "Le streghe".

=== 2005–2006; 2014: Lineup and label changes and the hiatus ===
In 2005, there was a change in the lineup when singer Micky left the band to move to Spain with her new partner José Redin, aka Joxemi from Ska-P, with whom she later formed No-Relax. After Rox Randisi joined the band, they moved to the Alternative Produzioni label, with whom they released the second studio album Strike, which also featured an ironic cover of the song "Freeway" by Bee Hive, the Japanese band from the anime Love Me, My Knight. A music video for the main single "Strike" was filmed, which was played on various music channels such as MTV, Rock TV, and All Music, and in 2005 they appeared as guests on All Music's program I Love Rock 'n' Roll. In the same year, they were guests on the show Markette - Tutto fa brodo in TV, hosted by Piero Chiambretti on La7.

In 2005, Bambole di Pezza organized a festival called Rockgirls, which featured various all-female bands and included a space dedicated to associations dealing with issues related to eating disorders (anorexia nervosa and bulimia) and sexual violence. In 2005 and 2006, they took part in various festivals, both Italian (such as Arezzo Wave and Venerelettrica) and European (Punk Italia in Germany or VenusRock and Nandrinfestival in Belgium).

After a few years' hiatus, the band reunited in 2014 to celebrate the tenth anniversary of the release of Strike, only to go on hiatus again after a few concerts.

=== 2021–present: The restart and Sanremo Music Festival ===
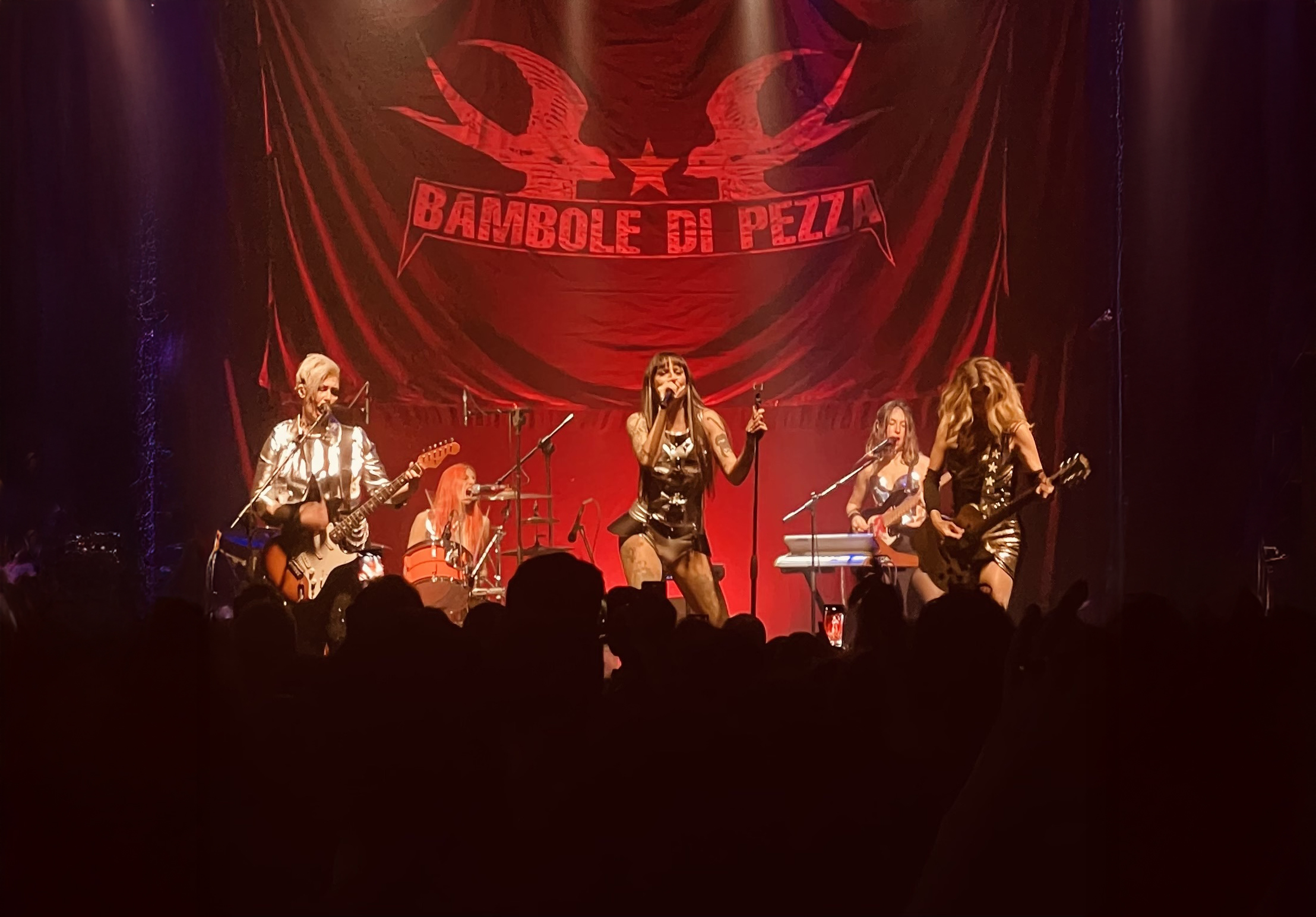
Bambole di pezza performing in 2025

In 2021, the two original guitarists, Morgana Blue and Dani, resumed the project with a new lineup that includes Cleo on vocals, Kaj on bass, and Xina on drums. This lineup made their debut at the 2022 Concerto del Primo Maggio in Piazza della Scala, alongside Rezophonic. In the summer of the same year, they released several singles, including "Favole (mi hai rotto il caxxo)", which reached over 2 million streams on Spotify, followed by a major national tour.

On September 25, they returned to play with Ska-P at Kozel Carroponte (Sesto San Giovanni) in front of a large audience. In October, they released the single "Rumore", a tribute to Italian singer and actress Raffaella Carrà, which was used as the soundtrack for the miniseries dedicated to the artist. On December 17, on the day it was established International Day for the Elimination of Violence Against Women, the band released the single "Non sei sola", which includes a feature by Jo Squillo.

In July 2023, the band released the third studio album Dirty, produced by Andrea Tripodi and distributed by Universal, once again focusing on social issues. A deluxe version of the album was released later, with three additional tracks. That same year, they were the opening act for Def Leppard and Mötley Crüe at the San Siro Hippodrome (Milan).

In 2024, they released further singles, including "Cresciuti male", in collaboration with J-Ax from Articolo 31, and played with Sex Pistols and Editors at the Ama Festival. In 2024, they moved to Nigiri, a label distributed by Sony, and released the singles "Stuntman" and "ZenZero".

On January 24, 2025, the fourth studio album Wanted was released, reaching a wider audience thanks to airplay on Radio Deejay's Summer Camp and Radio 2 Social Club. The album included the previously released singles, as well new releases such as "Superlove" and "Senza permesso". That same year, they were invited to play at the Concerto del Primo Maggio in Rome, followed by a tour throughout the peninsula.

On December 5, 2025, they signed a new record deal with EMI Records, a label of Universal Music. In the same year, Bambole di pezza's participation in the Sanremo Music Festival 2026 with "Resta con me" was announced.

== Members ==
=== Current members ===
- Martina "Cleo" Ungarelli – lead vocals (since 2021)
- Lisa "Morgana Blue" Cerri – lead guitar (since 2002)
- Daniela "Dani" Piccirillo – rhythm guitar, backing vocals (since 2002)
- Federica "Xina" Rossi – drums, backing vocals (since 2021)
- Caterina Alessandra "Kaj" Dolci – bass, keyboards, backing vocals (since 2021)

=== Former members ===
- Michela "Micky" Paiano – lead vocals (2002–2005)
- Rox Randisi – lead vocals (2005–2006; 2014)
- Franca "Franka Weird" Leotta – bass (2002–2006; 2014)
- Aika Ceccarelli – drums (2002–2006; 2014)

== Discography ==
=== Studio albums ===
- 2002 – Crash Me
- 2004 – Strike
- 2023 – Dirty
- 2025 – Wanted
- 2026 – 5

=== Singles ===
- 2002 – "Le streghe"
- 2002 – "Rock 'n' Roll"
- 2004 – "Strike"
- 2004 – "Contropressione"
- 2022 – "Favole (mi hai rotto il caxxo)"
- 2022 – "Rumore"
- 2022 – "Non sei sola" (feat. Jo Squillo)
- 2022 – "Io non sono come te"
- 2023 – "Contare 0"
- 2024 – "Freddy Krueger (Nightmare)"
- 2024 – "Stuntman"
- 2024 – "ZenZero"
- 2024 – "Cresciuti male" (feat. J-Ax)
- 2024 – "Rampicanti"
- 2025 – "Senza permesso"
- 2025 – "Ti amo coglione"
- 2025 – "Wanted"
- 2025 – "Superlove"
- 2025 – "Elettroshock"
- 2026 – "Resta con me"
