= Costantino della Gherardesca =

Italian actor, journalist, and presenter

Count Costantino della Gherardesca
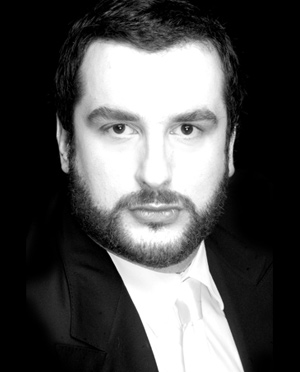
- Costantino della Gherardesca Verecondi Scortecci
- Born: Costantino della Gherardesca Verecondi Scortecci; 29 January 1977 (age 49); Rome, Italy
- Education: King's College London
- Occupations: Actor; journalist; radio presenter; aristocrat

Costantino della Gherardesca Verecondi Scortecci (born 29 January 1977, in Rome), or simply Costantino della Gherardesca, is an Italian actor, journalist, radio presenter, television personality and presenter.

Gherardesca is part of a notable aristocratic family and graduated in philosophy from King's College London, and entered show business at the start of the 2000s. Along with Giorgio Bozzo of P-Nuts he is best known for his participation as a commentator in television shows conducted by Piero Chiambretti, and currently presents Pechino Express and Boss in incognito for RAI and Discovery. Scortecci is the descendant of Count Ugolino della Gherardesca.

He is gay and interested in the preservation of the environment.

== Television ==
Year	Title	Network	Notes
2001	Chiambretti c'è	Rai 2	Opinionist
2003	ProntoChiambretti	La7	Opinionist
2004	Markette - Tutto fa brodo in TV	La7	Opinionist
2007	TG Show	Sky Show	
2008	Il ballo delle debuttanti	Canale 5	Juror
2009	Chiambretti Night	Italia 1	Opinionist
2011	Xtra Factor	Sky Uno	
2012	Eva	Rai 2	
2012	Born to Mix	Deejay TV	
2012	Pechino Express	Rai 2	Competitor in 2012; presenter since 2013
2014	Boss in incognito	Rai 2	
2015	Hair - Sfida all'ultimo taglio	Discovery Real Time	
2015	Best in Town - Il migliore in città	Discovery Real Time	
2015	Tanto vale	NOVE	
2016	Undercover Boss	NOVE	Commentator
2016	Pechino Addicted	Rai 4	Commentator
2017	Secondo Costa	Rai 2	Presenter
2020	Ballando con le Stelle (series 15)	Rai 1	Competitor
2021	Il cantante mascherato	Rai 1	
2021	Four Weddings	Sky Uno	
