= Ludo Poppe =

Ludo Poppe is the president of Eccholine, a line-production company for unscripted television formats founded in 2010. He is also the president of 4mat4, a television format managing company (Peking Express).

From October 2008 to july 2010 Poppe headed the Zodiak Entertainment front office in Los Angeles. From October 2007 to October 2008, Poppe was the vice-president in Continental Europe for Zodiak Television. From March 1993 to April 2008 Poppe was the president at Kanakna, the biggest independent producer of reality television in the Dutch-speaking market. Poppe co-founded the independent television production company with Pascal Decroos and Stef Soetewey. Shows include Survivor (Expeditie Robinson), Temptation Island, The Block, The Bachelor, Popstars, Paradise Hotel, That Will Teach Them, Date Café, Peking Express. In 2007, Swedish Zodiak Television acquired Kanakna.

From 1988 to 1996 Poppe was an executive producer and reporter of documentaries for Belgium's top documentary slot NV De Wereld. He was the executive producer and the reporter for the documentary series Beyond the Veil on political Islam. From 1996 to 2005, he was the executive producer and showrunner of docusoaps series for pubcaster VRT, e.g. Trailer Park, Children's Hospital, Police, Airport, and for reality programming. In 2003, he was creator, executive producer and showrunner of reality race television series Peking Express, broadcast in Italy, France, Spain, Scandinavia, Germany, Holland, Romania, Hungary, Colombia, Mexico, and Morocco.
