= Paola Barale =

Italian TV hostess and actress

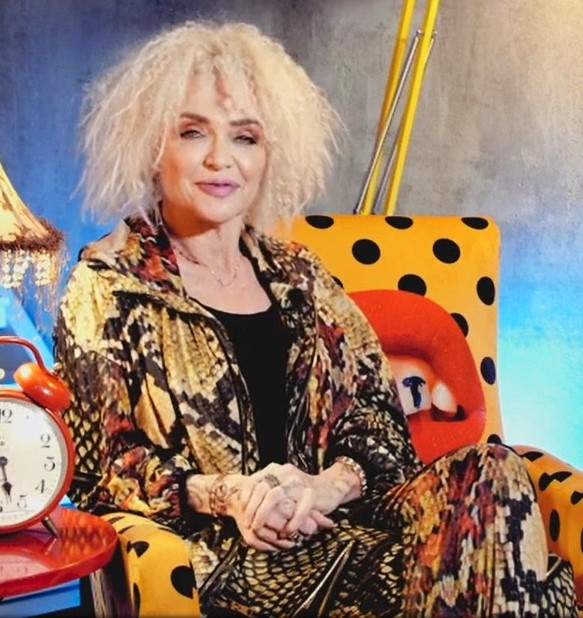
- Barale in 2023
- Born: 28 April 1967 (age 59); Fossano, Piedmont, Italy
- Website: http://www.paolabarale.it/

Paola Barale (born 28 April 1967) is an Italian TV presenter and actress. She was married to Gianni Sperti.

Her television career began by chance, in fact, she desired to become a gymnastics teacher and she had graduated from the former Higher Institute of Physical Education in Turin. Many, however, pointed out that she looked like a Madonna lookalike, referring to the look of the True Blue period, and began working on television. It is hosted for the first time Domenica in the 1986 edition conducted by Mino Damato, just as the lookalike of the American singer. She appeared in the final theme song of the variety show La TV delle ragazze, conducted by Serena Dandini.

Her first official work is that of Littorina in Antonio Ricci's Odiens programme. After an audition in the fall of 1989, she became Mike Bongiorno's official valet in several of his broadcasts, such as The Wheel of Fortune (1989–1995), All x One (1992–1993), Italian Festival (1993) and the two spin-offs of The Wheel of Fortune (1994–1995) and The Mundial Wheel (summer 1994). In the 1994–1995 season, she led in the morning, with Marco Predolin and Natalia Estrada, the first programme dedicated to telesales, entitled Department stores.

In the spring of 1995, she co-hosted the Valentine's Day special One Evening We Met, the special dedicated to the hundred years of cinema The Magnificent Ten, and the evening Four-legged Stars. In the summer of 1995, she conducted with Claudio Cecchetto A record for the summer, while in the autumn she presented an edition of the comic variety The Last? along with Gerry Scotti. In 1996 she brought back the evening Stars on all fours. She also joined Luca Barbareschi in The Great Bluff, and led with Rosario Fiorello A record for the summer.

== Selected filmography ==
- Cascina Vianello (TV-series, 1996)
- Broadcast (TV-Film, 2005)
- Vorrei vederti ballare (2012)
- Virus: Extreme Contamination (2015)
