= Ludovica Caramis =

Italian showgirl

- Born: 27 July 1991 (age 35); Rome, Italy
- Occupations: Model and showgirl
- Spouse: Mattia Destro (2014-present)
- Children: 1 (Leone Destro, b. 2020)
- Modeling information
- Height: 1.73 m (5 ft 8 in)
- Hair color: Brown
- Eye color: Green

Ludovica Caramis (born 27 July 1991) is an Italian model and showgirl.

== Biography ==
Born in Rome to Italian parents, but with a paternal grandfather of Greek origin, her career began in 2009 with the participation in the beauty contest of Miss Italia, where she ranks among the first twenty. From that moment she starts her experience in the entertainment world: on Rai 1 from September 2011 to June 2017, she has participated (with Laura Forgia, Eleonora Cortini and Francesca Fichera) as a "professor" in the television show L'eredità, presented by Carlo Conti until 2014 and by Fabrizio Frizzi from 2014. Caramis took part as showgirl in La Corrida - Dilettanti allo sbaraglio for the first time hosted by Carlo Conti and aired by Rai 1 in the spring of 2018; she was confirmed in the same role also in 2019 and 2020 seasons of Conti's program.

== Personal life ==
She got engaged to footballer Mattia Destro. The couple married on 1 September 2014, after two years of dating, in Ascoli Piceno. They have one son, Leone, born 8 September 2020.
