= Max Giusti =

Italian television presenter and actor (born 1968)

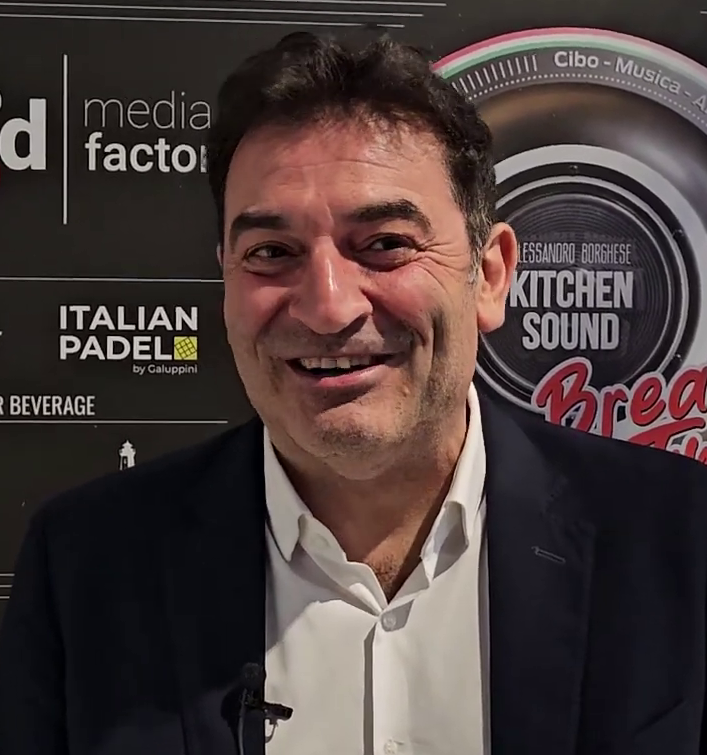
- Giusti in 2024
- Born: Massimiliano Giusti; 28 July 1968 (age 58); Rome, Italy
- Occupations: Comedian; cabaret artist; impersonator; television presenter; radio personality; actor; voice actor; playwright
- Height: 1.80 m (5 ft 11 in)
- Spouse: Benedetta Bellini (m. 2009)
- Children: 2

Massimiliano Giusti (born 28 July 1968), known professionally as Max Giusti, is an Italian comedian, cabaret artist, impersonator, television presenter, radio personality, actor, voice actor and playwright.

== Life and career ==
Of Marche origins on his father's side (Monterubbiano) and Sardinian on his mother's side (Norbello), Massimiliano Giusti was born in Rome in 1968. He grew up in the Portuense neighborhood of Rome, in Casetta Mattei and began his television career at a very young age.

=== Television ===
He made his television debut in 1991, appearing in two Rai 2 programs, Stasera mi butto and Ricomincio da due (the latter with Raffaella Carrà). In 1993, he participated in Mi raccomando alongside Massimo Ranieri, while later he took part in Mio capitano (1996) and the humorous program Seven show (1998–1999).

In 2001, he was one of the hosts of Stracult, a show that also featured Max Tortora and Éva Henger, which gained considerable popularity. He showcased his skills as an impersonator in Quelli che... il calcio, La grande notte del lunedì sera, alongside Gene Gnocchi and Simona Ventura, and in Cocktail d'amore, hosted by Amanda Lear, in which he imitated Cristiano Malgioglio. In 2003, he hosted Gli isolati, a satirical program based on the reality show L'isola dei famosi, which was a success with audiences and critics. In the summer of 2006, he co-hosted the first season of Matinée, broadcast on Rai 2, with Sabrina Nobile. Also in 2006, he was part of the cast of the RAI drama Raccontami, directed by Riccardo Donna and Tiziana Aristarco, where he played Marshal Mollica.

In 2007, he took over the hosting of Stile Libero Max, a show that revives the Libero format made famous by Teo Mammucari. Regular guests include comedian Lucia Ocone and music critic and renowned Italian rock guitarist Richard Benson. In 2007, he co-starred as Inspector Raffaele Marchetti in the cast of Distretto di Polizia 7, directed by Alessandro Capone, and was also present in the eighth season, which aired from September 2008. In the fall of 2008, he was also on air in the second season of the series Raccontami. Since September 2008, he has hosted one of Rai Uno's most important and controversial programs, Affari tuoi, replacing his colleague Flavio Insinna.

In September 2009, he returned to host the prime-time show Affari tuoi on Rai 1, which was part of the 2010 Italian Lottery. On Canale 5, he was once again among the stars of the new season of Distretto di Polizia, directed by Alberto Ferrari. In the 2009–2010 season of Quelli che... il calcio, Max was not part of the cast, but when Affari tuoi wasn't on the air for the Italian national football team, he made cameo appearances. In the spring of 2010, having replaced Fabrizio Frizzi with Soliti ignoti - Identità nascoste, he continued his hosting duties with the show Stasera è la tua sera, which aired for four consecutive Thursdays in prime time. In June 2010, he co-starred with Fabrizio Frizzi in the variety show Attenti a quei due - La sfida.

On 8 December 2010, he hosted the program Il pubblico da casa, a spin-off of the successful Da Da Da program, which relies exclusively on viewers' televoting. Viewers choose which categories of TV personalities, selected from RAI archives, will win the episode. From 13 February 2012 he returned to hosting Affari tuoi on Rai 1. On 2 June 2013 he hosted his final episode of the "Gioco dei pacchi". In five years of hosting, he has opened over 900 packages. Since January 2013, he has hosted the new Rai 1 variety show Riusciranno i nostri eroi, alongside actresses Laura Chiatti and Donatella Finocchiaro and showman Cristiano Malgioglio. In the summer of 2014, he hosted the comedy-sports program Maxinho do Brazil on Rai Sport 1, dedicated to the Brazilian World Cup.

On 31 May 2015, he was a guest, alongside Cristiano Malgioglio, on Quelli che... il calcio, hosted by Nicola Savino. On 2 June he hosted La partita del cuore on Rai 1, alongside Amadeus, Claudio Lippi and Pupo. From 11 September to 20 November 2015, she was a contestant on the program Tale e quale show, hosted by Carlo Conti on Rai 1.

From 29 August 2016, she joined Discovery, hosting the first season of the game show Boom! on Nove, which was later renewed for two more seasons. She later hosted the quiz-upfront Quizzovery for the channel, and in an episode of Cucine da incubo, she even made a crossover with her game show. From 27 August 2018, she hosted another quiz, Chi ti conosce?, which closed due to low ratings after 30 episodes on 5 October and the cooking show C'è posto per 30?.

In 2020, she and Marco Mazzocchi participated in the eighth season of Pechino Express as the Gladiatori duo, eliminated in the semifinals. He then hosted the new season of Boss in Incognito on Rai 2.

In 2021, he participated in the second season of Il cantante mascherato wearing the Wolf Mask, finishing third.

He then made his first move to Sky: from 1 September he hosted Guess My Age - Indovina l'età on TV8, replacing Enrico Papi, but this experience ended in the spring with the definitive closure of the game show. He also hosted the third round of the ninth season of Pechino Express on Sky Uno.

In 2024 and 2025, Giusti appeared on several programs: in the third and fourth editions of Sky's GialappaShow, where he imitated chef Alessandro Borghese in a parody of the program 4 ristoranti; in TV8's Gialappa's Night, where he imitated Aurelio De Laurentiis; as a contestant on Rai 1's game show Chi può batterci?; as the host for the fifth time of Boss in Incognito and the game show 99 da battere on Rai 2; and as a regular guest on Che tempo che fa on Nove as Cristiano Malgioglio. He also appeared as a contestant on the first episode of the eleventh edition of Stasera tutto è possibile.

In June 2025, his move to Mediaset was announced. In September, it was announced that he would host the Canale 5 game show Caduta libera, taking over from longtime host Gerry Scotti on December. He will then move on to host The Wall, Scherzi a parte, and the new prime-time game show The 1% Club.

=== Theater ===
Author and actor of numerous plays with his friend and then-girlfriend Selvaggia Lucarelli, he starred in Ceasefire in 1994, followed by 30 anni, Come un pesce fuor d'acqua and Il grande sfracello. In 2001, at the Palatenda Theater in Rome, he had the opportunity to work with Dario Fo and Enrico Montesano in Rassegna Mostrocomico.

Also in 2001, he directed Il GladiAttore, while the following year he produced Lo scemo del villaggio globale, a play on the theme of globalization, albeit with a touch of sarcasm. Now an established actor, he was directed by Pietro Garinei in Aggiungi un posto a tavola (2002) and Se il tempo fosse un gambero (2005). In 2008, he performed Max Giusti at the PalaLottomatica in Rome on 16 April and 14 July. It will be repeated on 26 July 2008. In 2017 he returns to the stage with Cattivissimo Max and Va tutto bene. From October 2022 to January 2024 he will be at the theatre with Il Marchese del Grillo. It is then the turn of Bollicine.

=== Cinema ===
His career has also branched out into film, where he made his debut in 2000 with Carlo Vanzina's comedy E adesso sesso. He had previously been part of the cast of the television film Ladri si nasce by Pier Francesco Pingitore and its sequel, Ladri si diventa, both aired on Canale 5.

In 2001, he had a role in Tom Tykwer's Heaven, while in 2004, he returned to more congenial genres with The Jokes, again by Vanzina. His latest big-screen roles include Ice on Fire, with Raoul Bova and Donatella Finocchiaro, and Nero bifamiliare, by Federico Zampaglione. On the big screen, he attempted dubbing for the first time in his career, lending his voice to Gru, the protagonist of the Universal Pictures film Despicable Me, a role he would continue in subsequent feature films in the franchise. In 2019 he played one of the protagonists in the film Appena un minuto, directed by Francesco Mandelli.

== Personal life ==
On 4 July 2009, he married Benedetta Bellini, with whom he had two children: Matteo, born on 23 November 2010, and Caterina, born on 9 June 2012.

He runs a tennis club in Rome, as he is a passionate fan of tennis.

On 3 October 2010, on the occasion of the national day for the fight against Amyotrophic Lateral Sclerosis, he participated in a free concert in Arzignano together with Lucio Dalla, Luca Carboni, Giusy Ferreri, Francesco Grollo, Fiorella Mannoia, Marco Mengoni, Ron and Statuto.

== Filmography ==
=== Actor ===
==== Film ====
Year	Title	Role	Notes
1997	Ladri si nasce	Leader of The Dead of Hunger	
2001	Ladri si diventa	Leader of The Dead of Hunger	
2002	E adesso sesso	Cesare	
2002	L'ispettore Derrick... e Harry!		
2002	Heaven	Policeman Chasing Ariel	
2004	The Jokes		
2006	Ice on Fire	Mario	
2007	Nero bifamiliare	Carlo Nobili	
2010	Despicable Me	Gru (voice)	Italian dub
2013	Despicable Me 2	Gru (voice)	Italian dub
2015	Minions	Gru (voice)	Italian dub
2017	Despicable Me 3	Gru / Dru (voice)	Italian dub
2018	Famosi in 7 giorni	Tamerlan	
2019	Appena un minuto	Claudio	
2022	Minions: The Rise of Gru	Gru (voice)	Italian dub
2023	La seconda chance	Max Mancini	
2024	Dicono di te	Giancarlo	
2024	Despicable Me 4	Gru (voice)	Italian dub

==== Television ====
Year	Title	Role	Network	Notes
2006–2008	Raccontami	Marshal Mollica	Rai 1	TV series
2007–2009	Distretto di Polizia	Inspector Raffaele Marchetti	Canale 5	TV series

== Television programs ==
Year	Title	Network	Role
1991	Stasera mi butto	Rai 2	Competitor
1991	Ricomincio da due	Rai 2	Regular guest
1994	Mi raccomando	Rai 1	Host
1996	Mio capitano	Rai 1	Host
1998–1999	Seven Show	Italia 7	Comedian
2001, 2003–2004	Stracult	Rai 2	Host
2001–2008, 2015–2017	Quelli che... il calcio	Rai 2	Comedian
2002–2003	La grande notte del lunedì sera	Rai 2	Host
2003	Gli isolati	Rai 2	Host
2003	Cocktail d'amore	Rai 2	Comedian
2006	Matinée	Rai 2	Host
2007	Stile Libero Max	Rai 2	Host
2008–2013	Affari tuoi	Rai 1	Host
2010	Stasera è la tua sera	Rai 1	Host
2010–2011	Attenti a quei due - La sfida	Rai 1	Host
2010	Il pubblico da casa	Rai 1	Host
2011	Colpo d'occhio - L'apparenza inganna	Rai 1	Host
2011	Un minuto per vincere	Rai 1	Host
2012	Super Club	Rai 2	Host
2012	100% Comico	Rai 2	Host
2013	Riusciranno i nostri eroi	Rai 1	Host
2014	Maxinho do Brazil	Rai Sport 1	Host
2014	SuperMaxTV	Rai 2	Host
2014	La papera non fa l'eco	Rai 2	Host
2014	Concerto di Natale	Rai 2	Host
2015	La partita del cuore	Rai 1	Host
2015	Techetechete'	Rai 1	Narrator of the seventy-fifth episode
2015	Tale e quale show	Rai 1	Contestant
2015	Tale e quale show - Il torneo	Rai 1	Contestant
2016	DopoFestival	Rai 1	Host
2016–2019	Boom!	Nove	Host
2018	C'è posto per 30?	Nove	Host
2018–2019	Chi ti conosce?	Nove	Host
2018–2019	Mai dire Talk	Italia 1	Comedian
2020	Pechino Express	Rai 2	Contestant
2022	Pechino Express	Sky Uno	Co-host
2020–2025	Boss in incognito	Rai 2	Host
2021	Il cantante mascherato	Rai 1	Contestant
2021	Va tutto bene!	Rai 2	Host
2021–2022	Guess My Age - Indovina l'età	TV8	Host
2022	Alessandro Borghese - Celebrity Chef	TV8	Contestant
2023	Fake Show - Diffidate delle imitazioni	Rai 2	Host
2024	Chi può batterci?	Rai 1	Contestant
2024–2025	GialappaShow	TV8	Comedian
2024–2025	Che tempo che fa	Nove	Regular guest
2025	99 da battere	Rai 2	Host
2025–present	Caduta libera	Canale 5	Host
2026–present	The Wall	Canale 5	Host

== Radio ==
Year	Title	Network
2010–2015	Radio 2 SuperMax	Rai Radio 2
2015–2016	Cattive compagnie	Rai Radio 2
