= Marco Liorni =

Italian television presenter and television writer (born 1965)

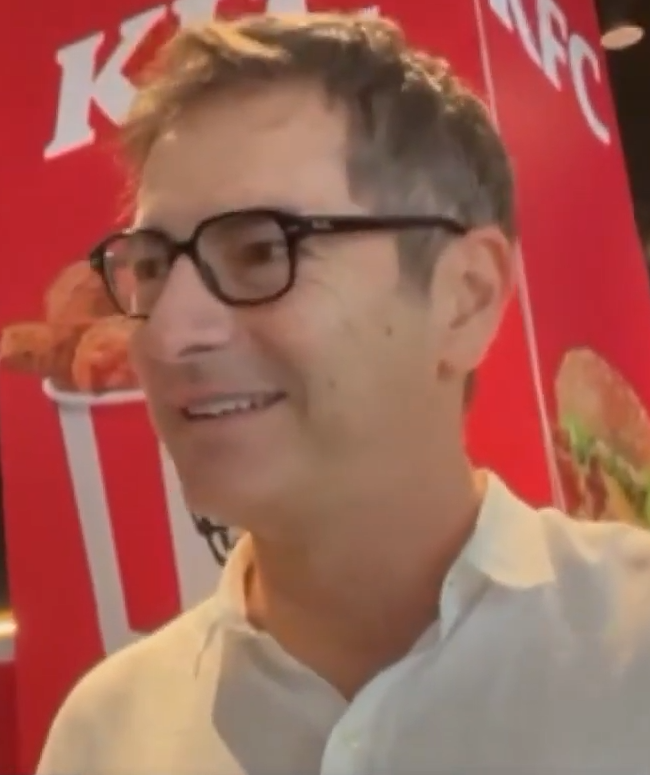
- Liorni in 2023
- Born: Marco Liorni; 6 August 1965 (age 61); Rome, Italy
- Occupations: Television presenter and television writer
- Height: 1.83 m (6 ft 0 in)

Marco Liorni (born 6 August 1965) is an Italian television presenter and television writer.

== Biography ==
Liorni was born in Rome, Italy in 1965 and obtained a classical high school diploma and a degree in humanities.

During his career, he won the Telegatto on three different occasions (for Trenta ore per la vita, Saranno famosi and Grande Fratello) and the TV Award - Premio regia televisione for La vita in diretta. In 2012, he was nominated as a revelation character.

== Career ==
=== Before TV debut ===
He took his first professional steps by hosting programmes for various local radio stations, also with the stage name of Marco Donati, including Tele Radio Domani and Radio Incontro. He later became a face of the television station GBR, with Cronaca near (inspired by Telefono giallo, by Corrado Augias) and Domenica a tutto goal together with Monica Leofreddi and Cristina Bianchino.

=== TV debut (1996) ===
In 1996, he made his debut on Canale 5 in Verissimo as a correspondent. He then replaced Cristina Parodi as host, and then hosted Verissimo on the spot on the flagship Mediaset network. On Italia 1, he hosted special evenings of Real TV and Eroi per caso (a remake of Ultimo minuto broadcast on Rai 3 from 1993 to 1997). From 1997 to 2000, he hosted the television programme, Angeli, an investigation into spirituality through the stories of people who feel they have come into contact with something they cannot explain rationally. From 2003 to 2014, he worked at the radio programme, RDS.

=== Correspondent for Grande Fratello and other projects ===
In 2000, he was a correspondent for the television programme Grande Fratello, the "charon" who ferries people who were previously unknown to TV, then recounting the experiences and the consequences of the sudden fame in the families of the contestants. In the first three editions, he hosted monthly specials of Grande Fratello story and the Sunday episodes within the Buona domenica container. He held this role until the 7th edition, in 2007, when he left the programme and Mediaset.

In 2001, he hosted an unsuccessful experiment on Rete 4, a program created by Anna Fermi entitled Marte & Venere, on the dialogues between the couple. For several years, he also curated Medici - storie di medici e pazienti on Rete 4. Still on Italia 1, he presented the test series of Il protagonista and Diario - Esperimento d'amore.

Other programmes include: Saranno famosi (now Amici di Maria De Filippi), Modamare Capri and Taormina, Thirty hours for life, Padre Pio - Le prove della santità with Giuliano Ferrara and on Sat2000, La fabbrica e il bosco - Seveso 30 anni dopo years later, a documentary directed by Luciano Piscaglia and written with Marco Bergamaschi and Alessandro Zaccuri on the accident of 10 July 1976, in Seveso when a toxic cloud containing dioxin was released from the ICMESA plants in the neighboring municipality of Meda.

In 2003, he hosted Sposami subito! on Canale 5, a reality show in which a man or a woman puts their partner under pressure by asking to be married immediately on live TV. The programme, produced by Endemol Italia, was a success with the public, but the same production company sold it to Rai, where it aired two series hosted by Antonella Clerici.

In 2006, he presented on Mediaset Premium, assisted by Platinette, the programme Il Candidato, which allows the live selection of one of the contestants of the seventh edition of Grande Fratello. In 2008, he presented on Sky Vivo (now Sky Uno) The Singing Office, a programme defined as a "feel-good show" in which the employees of some important companies perform choreographed songs. In the end, Alitalia was the winner, and in a very critical historical phase for the Italian national airline. The programme was broadcast in the first weeks of programming on Cielo, Sky's digital terrestrial channel. The singer and presenter Amanda Lear also appeared in the program hosted by Liorni.

=== Transition to Rai and infotainment (2009–2018) ===
In April 2009, he made his debut on Rai 1 in prime time, taking care of the connections of I sogni son desideri, hosted by Caterina Balivo, a remake of programs such as Sogni and Il treno dei desideri. On Rai 2, he hosted Italia Fan Club Music Awards, assisted by Benedetta Valanzano, and in January 2010 he hosted on Rai 1, together with Arianna Ciampoli, Francesco, il frate piccolino, a special dedicated to Francis of Assisi on the occasion of the inauguration of the Antonianum Auditorium in Rome.

In 2010, he hosted and wrote the sixteen episodes of Tra cielo e terra, a programme dedicated to beautiful abbeys and fascinating monasteries in Europe, broadcast on the Marcopolo satellite channel, which at the time was part of the Sky platform.

In January 2011, he made his debut on Rai 1 as host of a zero number entitled Perfetti innamorati, together with Georgia Luzi, and is co-author with Giorgio Amato of Tutta colpa di Facebook!, a theatrical comedy that ironically tells of some of the changes brought about by social networks in social customs and sentimental relationships, based on the same book by Liorni Facebook. Tutti nel vortice published by Armando Curcio Editore. From 11 July to 5 August 2011, he hosted Estate in diretta on Rai 1 with Lorella Landi, the summer version of La vita in diretta. In the 2011/2012 season, he hosted Buon pomeriggio Italia! with Mara Venier, which aired at 3:15 pm on Rai 1 from Monday to Friday; in the same period, he also hosted La vita in diretta on Rai 1 with Mara Venier. In 2012, with the programme, he won the TV Oscar, Television Direction Award, together with Mara Venier and was nominated as "revelation character" together with Teresa Mannino and Rocco Papaleo, who won the award.

Between 2012 and 2014, he hosted programmes on Rai Premium and Rai Movie dedicated to films, cinema, and television fiction, such as Fictionmania and Roma Daily.

In 2013 he was confirmed for the second edition of Estate in diretta, alongside Barbara Capponi. In 2014 he was the author and host of I love you! Ama e fa' quello che vuoi, on Rai Premium, the series, dedicated to great love stories, is then repeated on Rai 1.

Together with Cristina Parodi, he hosted on Rai 1 the 2014/2015 edition of La vita in diretta. On the same network, since 21 February 2015, he has been a judge on the third edition of the talent show Notti sul ghiaccio, hosted by Milly Carlucci. In the 2015/2016 season, he was once again at the helm of La vita in diretta together with Cristina Parodi, and in prime time on Rai 1, he hosts the entertainment television programme Il dono with Paola Perego.

In 2016, he wrote for the theatre X = Y, a text against gender violence with the company Teatro in movimento, performed in numerous schools in the capital, as well as at the Teatro Sistina in Rome on the International Day against violence against women.

In the summer of 2017, he hosted the 60th edition of the Castrocaro Festival in prime time on Rai 1, paired with Rossella Brescia; while, since 11 September, he hosts her sixth and final edition of La vita in diretta together with Francesca Fialdini.

=== New TV Careers (2018–present) ===
After finishing his career at La vita in diretta, for the 2018/2019 season, he is the creator and host of the programme ItaliaSì!, broadcast on Saturdays, a programme also confirmed in the following seasons.

From 16 November to 7 December 2019, he hosted the semi-finals of Sanremo Giovani 2019 within ItaliaSì!; from 1–26 June 2020, from Monday to Friday, he hosts ItaliaSì! Giorno per giorno, replacing the programme Storie italiane which ended the season early.

With ItaliaSì! he creates numerous specials dedicated to the Corinaldo massacre, the Sanremo Festival, the COVID-19 pandemic and the British monarchy.

From the summer of 2019 to 2024, he hosted the game show Reazione a catena on Rai 1, setting a record for editions and episodes hosted; under his guidance, each edition, except that of 2020, ended with the tournament Reazione a catena - La sfida dei campione between the best teams. On September 30 and October 7, 2023, he hosted the prime time special Tutti giocano a Reazione a catena with famous people as contestants.

Since 2 January 2024, he has hosted the twenty-second edition of L'eredità, replacing Flavio Insinna, after the initial designation of Pino Insegno. On 16 and 23 March, he hosted the prime time specials of L'eredità dedicated to the Sanremo Festival and Rai on Rai 1.

He began the new 2024/2025 television season by hosting the pilot episode of the game show Chi può batterci?, broadcast in prime time on Rai 1 on Saturday, 21 September 2024, while from 3 November, he returns to the helm of the twenty-third edition of L'eredità. In the same year, he made a cameo in an episode of Don Matteo 14 as himself, as host of Reazione a catena. On December 31, he hosted L'anno che verrà, a musical event in anticipation of New Year's Day, most viewed in Italy, taking the place of Amadeus. From 11 January 2025, he has hosted the musical show Ora o mai più.

== Personal life ==
From his first wife, Cristina, whom he married in 1993, he had a son, Niccolò. In 2014, he married his second wife Giovanna Astolfi in the U.S., with whom he had daughters Emma and Viola; the marriage was made official in Italy in 2016.

== Television programmes ==
- Cronaca nera (Gbr, 1995)
- Domenica a tutto goal (Gbr, 1995)
- Verissimo (Canale 5, 1996–1997)
- Verissimo sul posto (Canale 5, 1998)
- Angeli (Italia 1, 1997–1999; Rete 4, 2000)
- Trenta ore per la vita (Canale 5, 1998–1999) – sent (1998); presenter (1999)
- Eroi per caso (Italia 1, 1998)
- Real TV (Italia 1, 1999)
- Padre Pio - Le prove della santità (Canale 5, 1999)
- Modamare a Capri (Canale 5, 2000)
- Grande Fratello (Canale 5, 2000–2007) – sent
- Il diario di Grande Fratello (Canale 5, 2000)
- Medici - Storie di medici e pazienti (Rete 4, 2000–2006)
- Marte e Venere (Rete 4, 2001)
- Modamare a Taormina (Canale 5, 2001)
- Il protagonista (Italia 1, 2002)
- Saranno famosi (Italia 1, 2002)
- Palermo - La notte della moda (Rete 4, 2003)
- Diario - Esperimento d'amore (Italia 1, 2003)
- Sposami subito! (Canale 5, 2003)
- Stelle a quattro zampe (Rete 4, 2005)
- La fabbrica e il bosco - Seveso 30 anni dopo (Sat 2000, 2005)
- Il candidato (Mediaset Premium, 2006)
- Tutti pazzi per i reality (Canale 5, 2006)
- Giffoni Film Festival (Canale 5, 2006)
- Sfilata d'amore e moda (Rete 4, 2006)
- GF Mania (Italia 1, 2007)
- The Singing Office (Sky Vivo, 2008)
- I sogni son desideri (Rai 1, 2009)
- Italia Fan Club Music Awards (Rai 2, 2009)
- Francesco - Il frate piccolino (Rai 1, 2010)
- Tra cielo e terra (Marcopolo, 2010–2011)
- Perfetti innamorati (Rai 1, 2011)
- Estate in diretta (Rai 1, 2011, 2013)
- Buon pomeriggio, Italia! (Rai 1, 2011–2013)
- La vita in diretta (Rai 1, 2011–2013, 2014–2018)
- Telethon (Rai 1, 2011, 2018)
- Fictionmania (Rai Premium, 2012)
- Notte di luce (Rai 1, 2012)
- Roma Daily (Rai Movie, 2013)
- I love you - Ama! ...e fa' ciò che vuoi (Rai Premium, 2013–2014)
- Italia in diretta (Rai 1, 2014–2015)
- Notti sul ghiaccio (Rai 1, 2015) – sworn
- Il dono (Rai 1, 2015–2016)
- Un goal per l'Italia (Rai 1, 2017)
- Festival di Castrocaro (Rai 1, 2017)
- ItaliaSì! (Rai 1, 2018–2024)
- ItaliaSì! alle 15 (Rai 1, 2018)
- Reazione a catena - L'intesa vincente (Rai 1, 2019–2024)
- Reazione a catena - La sfida dei campioni (Rai 1, 2019, 2021–2024)
- Sanremo Giovani a ItaliaSì! (Rai 1, 2019)
- ItaliaSì! Giorno per giorno (Rai 1, 2020)
- #OnePeopleOnePlanet - Earth Day 2021 (RaiPlay, 2021)
- Tutti giocano a Reazione a catena (Rai 1, 2023)
- L'eredità (Rai 1, dal 2024)
- L'eredità - Serata Sanremo (Rai 1, 2024)
- L'eredità - Viva la Rai (Rai 1, 2024)
- Chi può batterci? (Rai 1, 2024)
- L'anno che verrà (Rai 1, 2024)
- Ora o mai più (Rai 1, 2025)
