= Eleonora Cortini =

Italian showgirl, model, actress and television presenter

- Born: 14 January 1992 (age 34); Trieste
- Occupations: Model; actress; television presenter
- Modeling information
- Height: 1.71 m (5 ft 7 in)
- Hair color: Brown
- Eye color: Green

Eleonora Cortini (born 14 January 1992) is an Italian model, actress and television presenter known for her soubrette roles. She was born in Trieste.

== Television ==
Year	Title	Network	Notes	Ref.
2009	Il futuro? È uno show	Regional Tuscany digital networks	Event winner	
2010	Il futuro? È uno show	Regional Tuscany digital networks	Presenter	
2010–11	Balla che ti passa	Regional Tuscany digital networks	Co-presenter	
2011–present	L'eredità	Rai 1	"Professoresse" member	
2011	Soliti ignoti - Identità nascoste	Rai 1	Hidden identity: "professoressa a L'eredità"	
2012	Premio TV - Premio regia televisiva 2012	Rai 1	Received an award with Carlo Conti for her appearances as a "professoresse" in L'eredità	
2013	Premio TV - Premio regia televisiva 2013	Rai 1	Received an award with Carlo Conti for her appearances as a "professoresse" in L'eredità	
2014	Premio TV - Premio regia televisiva 2014	Rai 1	Received an award with Carlo Conti for her appearances as a "professoresse" in L'eredità	
2014	Tale e Quale Show	Rai 1	As Melanie C of the Spice Girls along with the "professoresse" and Gabriele Cirilli	
2015	Pechino Express	Rai 2	Finalist (fourth along with Laura Forgia as "Le professoresse")	
2018	Mezzogiorno in Famiglia	Rai 2	Guest	

== Filmography ==
Year	Title	Role	Notes	Ref.
2011	10 ragazze	Luisa		
2015	Malizia e passione		Short film	

== Others ==
Year	Title	Notes	Ref.
2016	A casa delle proff	ToTape channel co-founded and co-managed with Laura Forgia	
