= Affari tuoi =

Italian TV game show

- Genre: Game show
- Created by: John de Mol; Dick de Ryk
- Inspired by: Deal or No Deal
- Starring: Paolo Bonolis; Pupo; Antonella Clerici; Flavio Insinna; Max Giusti; Carlo Conti; Amadeus; Stefano De Martino
- Country of origin: Italy
- Original language: Italian

Production
- Production company: Endemol Shine Italia

Original release
- Network: Rai Italia
- Release: 13 October 2003 – 17 March 2017
- Release: 16 April 2023 – present

Affari tuoi (pronounced [afˈfaːri ˈtwɔi]; English: "Your Business") is an Italian game show based upon the internationally popular game show Deal or No Deal. It aired on Rai 1 from 13 October 2003 to 17 March 2017 and again from 16 April 2023 in the access prime time range.

The show was hosted by, in chronological order: Paolo Bonolis (October 2003 – May 2005), Pupo (September 2005 – March 2006), Antonella Clerici (March – June 2006), Flavio Insinna (September 2006 – June 2008), Max Giusti (September 2008 – June 2013), and again Flavio Insinna (September 2013 – 17 March 2017). The show was brought back in 2023 and was hosted by the Italian presenter Amadeus (April 2023 - June 2024) and Stefano De Martino (since September 2024).

== Gameplay ==
In this Italian version, there are 20 boxes; each person holding a box lives in and represents one of the twenty regions of Italy.

The highest prize is €300,000. In addition to small money prizes, like €0 or €1, there were three gag prizes, usually items like salami, a year's supply of soap, or stuffed animals like hippos and weasels (from seasons 2006 to 2007, a hippo prize took place instead of the €500 one).

The box named Pacco X, and also a Pacco Y between September 2008 and June 2013 (both meaning "mystery package"), may contain values between €0.02 and €200,000 (see below).

The box named Pacco Matto (crazy box, February 2011 – June 2013) or La Matta (the madwoman, from September 2013 to March 2017) may contain one of the possibilities that may affect the progress of the game, positively or negatively, including doubling the top prize to €1,000,000 or forcing the player to leave the game (see below).

The box named Pacco Nero (the Black Box) is similar to Pacco X and Pacco Y. It was introduced in 2025 and contains a duplicate of any other amount from €0 to €300,000.(see below)

The manager is known as "Il Dottore" (the doctor) and knows the contents of the boxes. Therefore, sometimes his offers can give hints as to whether the contestant's box contains a high amount of money. The manager can also give the contestant an option to change his box.

In order to give himself further chances, the manager sometimes decides to play "Di pacco in pacco" ("step by step") when high prizes are still active.

In Affari tuoi, to refuse an offer, instead of saying "No Deal!", a contestant says, "Rifiuto l'offerta e vado avanti", meaning "I refuse the offer and go on". To accept, a contestant says "Accetto l'offerta", meaning, "I'll take the offer." Unlike the US version of the show, there is no button to push. (In fact, international versions of Deal do not use a button and cover.)

=== Comparison with other versions ===
- The French version of "Deal or No Deal", À prendre ou à laisser, is almost identical to this version, adapting the "box for each region" concept, but 22 boxes are used (later 24).
- The Spanish version, ¡Allá tú!, aired by Mediaset's Telecinco is the same format as the French version, except that the boxes represent 22 of the 50 provinces of Spain.
- The British version does not use the "box for each region" concept, but is still similar in format to the French and Spanish versions, using 22 boxes.

== Top prize winners ==
The first winner of €1 million occurred on 7 April 2006, when Maria Giulia Tullo from Fossalto won €1,000,000. Just ten days later, Vincenzo de Paola from Campobasso won €500,000. They also received the Tapiro d'Oro (Golden Tapir) from the Canale 5 show Striscia la notizia, due to suspected fraud.

On 17 March 2012, another million euro winning occurred to Gabriele Calvello, thanks to picking Raddoppia which doubles the top prize after opening Pacco Matto. Calvello, whose father died of cancer, decided to donate part of his winnings for cancer research.

In addition, thirteen players won €500,000 in their boxes:

- Roberto Pepi (4 February 2004)
- Francesca Madeddu (16 December 2004)
- Clarissa Meneghini (19 December 2007)
- Danilo Anderlini (17 September 2008)
- Francesca Cataldo (22 October 2008)
- Roberto Caterina (23 November 2008)
- Mara Ancelotti (1 January 2009)
- Stefania Menegazzo (22 February 2010)
- Mauro Ghiraldini (21 November 2012)
- Patrizia Montalbano (25 January 2013)
- Pierangela Zaccaria (29 May 2014)
- Alberto Bindi (17 May 2016)
- Alessandro Corona (22 February 2017)

And four players won €300,000 in their boxes

- Luca Sartori (17 May 2024)
- Ornella Falla (26 September 2024)
- Francesca Atorino (2 October 2025)
- Angelo Russo (3 October 2025)

On 16 March 2013, Cristiana Fraccon from Carugate accepted the offer of €500,000, which is the biggest offer in the show's history, with €50 and the doubled top prize of €1,000,000 remaining. She had the latter in her box.

== Controversy ==
In autumn 2006 Codacons, an Italian consumer organisation, pointed out how high-priced boxes ("pacchi") seemed to survive up to the end of the game in many more cases than would be statistically expected.

== Box values ==
=== Box values (current) ===
€0	PACCO NERO
€1	€10,000
€5	€15,000
€10	€20,000
€20	€30,000
€50	€50,000
TOMMASINO	€75,000
€100	€100,000
€200	€200,000
BALLERINA	€300,000

NOTES:

- Tommasino is a dog that appears when his box is opened.
- When the BALLERINA box is opened, dancer Martina Miliddi will perform a choreographed routine (sometimes said routine will include Herbert).

=== Box values (original) ===
Note: Some small values will be replaced with joke prizes.

€0.01	€5,000
€0.20	€10,000
€0.50	€15,000
€1	€20,000
€5	€25,000
€10	€50,000
€50	€75,000
€100	€100,000
€250	€250,000
€500	€500,000

=== Pacco X and Pacco Y ===
Pacco X (and also Pacco Y from September 2008 to June 2013) are unknown content boxes (the mystery packages). At a certain point in the game, the contestant is asked to select one of the ten envelopes (two of twenty until June 2013) contained in a poll and containing a prize from €0.02 to €200,000. Pacco X was discontinued in 2015.

=== Pacco Nero ===
The Pacco Nero (the Black Box) is similar to Pacco X and Pacco Y. It was introduced in 2025 and contains a duplicate of any other amount from €0 to €300,000.

=== Brivido ===
Previously known as Pacco Matto (crazy box) until June 2013, and La Matta (the madwoman) until June 2014 and Sgambetto (trip) until June 2016. If the player has not sold his/her box yet and there are more than two unopened boxes, once Brivido (shiver) is opened, the player is asked to take one of six cards containing each of the following:

- Cambio obbligato (Forced swap): The player is forced to swap his/her box with one of the other unopened boxes.
- Niente special (Nothing special): Special (see below) is no longer effective when the player reveals 3 "blues" in a row.
- Pari o dispari? (Even or odd?): The player has to open either all even- or odd-numbered boxes in play.
- Ci pensa lui (He'll take care of it): The player will temporarily leave the place, and is replaced in the choice of the next 3 boxes with the box holder who opened Brivido. If there are any offers within those 3 box picks, the box holder has to decide whether the player should take it.
- Cambi con due? (Swap with two?): The player can either keep his/her box or swap it with two of the other boxes.
- Paccologia (Parcelology): A screenshot from a past episode of the show with several remaining amounts is shown, and the player is asked to guess which was won. The doctor reveals one of the boxes containing a "blue" amount if the player guessed correctly.

Brivido had a value of €200 if held by the player.

The following once appeared but were later replaced:

- Raddoppia (Double): The biggest unrevealed amount is doubled (except for Pacco X and Pacco Y).
- Apri un blu (Open a blue): The doctor tells the player the number of a box containing a "blue" amount (from €0.01 to €250, except for Pacco X and Pacco Y). It is only effective if there are at least two "blue" amounts remaining.
- Vedo e prevedo (I see and predict): The player is asked to predict the content of the next box. The player wins an extra €1,000 for a correct guess.
- Ci penso io (I'll take care of it): The player will temporarily leave the place, and is replaced in the choice of the next 3 boxes with the box holder who opened the scroll. If there are any offers within those 3 box picks, the box holder has to decide whether the player should take it.
- Provaci (Try it): The player undergoes a skill test (such as quizzes, riddles, etc.) as requested by the doctor. The player wins an extra €1,000 if the test is passed.
- Mangia come parli (Eat what you say): The player tests with a recipe or with the dishes offered in dialect. The player wins an extra €1,000 if the test is passed.
- Chiedo l’aumento (I ask for the raise): The box will increase by 10% of its final payout. (That increase does not include prizes or prizes with the "Game of the 3 boxes")
- Vinci 1.000 euro (Win 1,000 euros): The player additionally wins €1,000.
- Vinci subito 5.000€ (Win 5,000 euros now): The player additionally wins €5,000.
- Non scegli tu (You don't choose): The player chooses one from 19 other box holders, and the chosen one chooses the next box to open. It is not effective if there are only two unopened boxes after Pacco Matto is opened.
- Come non detto (As never said): Nothing happens and the game goes on.
- Proposta indecente (Naughty proposal): The doctor makes a "strategic" proposal, for example, offering to reveal the content of a box, but halving all prizes.
- Scarta (Discard): The player chooses one from the other unopened boxes, and it is kept unopened until the doctor (i.e. the banker) decides to open it. It is only effective if there are at least four unopened boxes after Pacco Matto is opened.
- Oggettino (Small object): The player wins an additional €50 and a small object prize.
- Oggettone (Large object): The player wins an additional €50 and a large object prize.
- Svela la X (Reveal the X): The value of Pacco X is revealed.
- Conta (Count): The player chooses the next box to open through a counting-out game, which starts from the first unopened box except for the one held by the player.
- Vai o resti (Go or stay): The player is asked to choose between going on or quitting the game immediately until the next time he/she is chosen as the player again. This could be useful when the player is in a bad situation, such as when there are only small amounts remaining.
- Arrivederci (Goodbye): The player leaves the game instantly and is replaced by one of the box holders. The new player is chosen by revealing the name of a region hidden in La busta nera (the black envelope).
- Pericolo Pubblico (Audience risk): The player chooses one of the audience members, and the chosen one chooses the next box to open.
- Apri un pacco in più (Open one more box): The player is asked to open one more box before the offer.
- Dimezza (Half): The biggest unrevealed amount is halved (except for Pacco X and Pacco Y).
- Chiama i vicini (Call the neighbours): The player has to open all boxes held by the holders from the player's region of origin (North, Central or South).
- Salvo (Safe): Nothing happens and the game goes on.
- Lucchetto (Lock): The player is asked to "lock" one of the remaining boxes, and the prize contained in it will no longer be won. This box will be opened by the host only after the player has decided whether to accept or reject the offer.

=== Pacco Natale or Pacco Befana ===
During Christmas specials, one of the amounts (€50,000 in 2012, €10,000 in 2013 and 2014) is replaced with Pacco Natale (Christmas box) until Christmas Day or Pacco Befana (Befana box) after Christmas until Epiphany (6 January). Once the box is opened, the player selects one of 10 gift boxes and wins the gift contained within the chosen box.

== Additional games ==
- Gioco dell'indovino (Game of the soothsayer, February – June 2012)

Before opening one of the first six boxes, the player is asked to guess the contents of the box. The player wins an extra €5,000 for a correct guess.

- Gioco del superpacco (Game of the superbox, September 2012 – June 2013)

Before opening one of the first three boxes, the player is asked to guess the contents of the box. If the player guesses correctly, the biggest unrevealed amount other than €500,000 becomes €500,000.

- Gioco dei 3 Pacchi (Game of 3 boxes, September 2013 – June 2015)

The player wins an extra €5,000 if the box containing Pachito is found within the first three picks.

- Che jella sia (May it be bad luck, September 2013 – March 2017)

The player can decide whether to play the game with 5 to 14 boxes remaining. Each of the "blues" remaining (including Brivido) has a value of €10,000. If the player manages to reveal all "reds" with at least one "blue" unrevealed, the player wins €10,000 for each "blue" unrevealed. Otherwise, the player leaves with nothing.

- Special

September 2015 – June 2016: If the player reveals 3 "blues" in a row, the player undergoes a skill test as requested by the doctor. The player wins an extra €3,000 if the test is passed. If the player reveals 3 consecutive "blues" for the second time, the highest amount in play is increased by €100,000. For the third time, the player leaves the game with €10,000. The €3,000 bonus is also withdrawn.
September 2016 – March 2017: If the player reveals 3 "blues" in a row, the highest "pink" amount (from €500 to €32,000) in play is doubled. For the second time, the highest amount in play is increased by €100,000. For the third time, the player leaves the game with €10,000.

- La regione fortunata (The lucky region, from April 2023 onwards)

When there are two boxes left, the player can choose to play this game instead of taking the amount in their box. If they decide to play, they must select the region they think is inside the host's envelope. If they guess right, they will win €100,000. If they guess wrong, they will have a second chance with half of the wrong answers eliminated. If they guess right the second time, they win €50,000. If they guess wrong the second time, they win absolutely nothing.

== Trivia ==
On 5 February 2007, Flavio Insinna appeared with his models on the US version of Deal or No Deal via satellite, to wish a contestant from Sicily luck. The Sicilian, who appeared on the US show with his extended family, was also an avid viewer of Affari tuoi.
