= Ne vedremo delle belle =

Italian talent competition television series

- Title card
- Italian: Ne vedremo delle belle
- Genre: Talent show
- Presented by: Carlo Conti
- Judges: Christian De Sica; Mara Venier; Frank Matano
- Country of origin: Italy
- Original language: Italian
- No. of episodes: 1

Production
- Executive producers: Eleonora Iannelli; Marco Cingoli; Giacomo Gagliardo
- Production companies: Endemol Shine Italy; RAI

Original release
- Network: Rai 1
- Release: 22 March 2025 – present

Ne vedremo dell belle (lit. 'We'll See Some Beautiful Ones') is an Italian talent show competition series on Rai 1. Hosted by Carlo Conti, the show features ten celebrity television "showgirls" from the 1980s, 1990s and 2000s competing against each other, with Christian De Sica, Mara Venier and Frank Matano as judges. It premiered on 22 March 2025, and was produced by Endemol Shine Italy and RAI.

== Format ==
In the series, ten celebrity showgirls, known for their work on television variety shows in the 1980s, 1990s and 2000s, prepare weekly for five tests of their talent (singing, dancing, musical, interview and a surprise challenge called "derby"). During each episode, they compete against each other in one-on-one challenges, not knowing in advance who they will challenge or what the challenge is. They are judged by a jury of three show personalities, and the other eight showgirls.

The sum of the votes obtained by each showgirl during the episodes determines the general ranking, and at the end of the series, the showgirl who obtains the highest score is proclaimed the winner. The cash prize of 20,000 euros will be donated to the charity Una None Centomila.

Ne vedremo dell belle is hosted by Carlo Conti, with Christian De Sica, Mara Venier and Frank Matano as judges.

The program is a format from Endemol Shine Italy and RAI, written by Conti together with Ivana Sabatini, Emanuele Giovannini, Leopoldo Siano and Mario D'Amico with the collaboration of Mattia Bravi. The executive producers are Eleonora Iannelli, Marco Cingoli and Giacomo Gagliardo.

== Contestants ==
Competitor	Ranking
Lorenza Mario	1
Carmen Russo	2
Matilde Brandi	3
Pamela Prati	4
Laura Freddi	4
Angela Melillo	6
Valeria Marini	7
Veronica Maya	7
Adriana Volpe	9
Patrizia Pellegrino	10

== Broadcast ==
Ne vedremo dell belle premiered on Rai 1 on 22 March 2025, and consists of four episodes.
