= Laura Forgia =

Italian actress and model

- Born: Laura Lena Forgia; 9 October 1982 (age 43); Angera
- Other name: Lena Harva (stage name)
- Education: University of Insubria
- Occupations: Showgirl; model; actress; television presenter
- Modeling information
- Height: 1.74 m (5 ft 9 in)
- Hair color: Blond
- Eye color: Blue

Laura Lena Forgia (born 9 October 1982), sometimes known as Lena Harva, is an Italian showgirl, model, actress and television presenter. She was born in Angera to an Italian father and Swedish mother.

== Television ==
Year	Title	Network	Notes	References
2007–08	Talent1	Italia 1	Co-presenter	
2007–08	Talent1 Night, la notte dei talenti	Italia 1	Co-presenter	
2008	Veline	Canale 5	Competitor	
2008	Artù	Rai 2	Assistant	
2009	Documentario in Corea	Sky	Invited	
2009	Scherzi a parte	Italia 1	Acted	
2009–10	Oktagon	Italia 1, Dahlia TV	Invited	
2009–10	Cuork - Viaggio al centro della coppia	La7	Acted	
2010	Sai cosa c'è di nuovo?	Canale 10, Odeon 24	Presenter	
2010–11	L'almanacco del Gene Gnocco	Rai 3	Acted	
2010–11	Le Iene	Italia 1	Acted	
2011	Saturday Night Live from Milano	Italia 1	Acted	
2011–16	L'eredità	Rai 1	"Professoresse" member	
2011	Soliti ignoti - Identità nascoste	Rai 1	Hidden identity: "professoressa a L'eredità"	
2012	Premio TV - Premio regia televisiva 2012	Rai 1	Received an award with Carlo Conti for her appearances as a "professoresse" in L'eredità	
2013	La prova del cuoco	Rai 1	Wins in the green pepper team in the kitchen	
2013	Premio TV - Premio regia televisiva 2013	Rai 1	Received an award with Carlo Conti for her appearances as a "professoresse" in L'eredità	
2014	Premio TV - Premio regia televisiva 2014	Rai 1	Received an award with Carlo Conti for her appearances as a "professoresse" in L'eredità	
2014	Temptation Island	Canale 5	Temptress	
2014	Temptation Island e poi	Canale 5	Temptress	
2014	Tale e Quale Show	Rai 1	As Emma Bunton of the Spice Girls along with the "professoresse" and Gabriele Cirilli	
2015	Pechino Express	Rai 2	Finalist (fourth along with Eleonora Cortini as "Le professoresse")	
2016–17	Cultura moderna	Italia 1, Mediaset Extra	Co-presenter	
2017	Tiki Taka - Il calcio è il nostro gioco	Italia 1	Opinionist	
2017	Sbandati	Rai 2	"Panelist" and special guest	
2017–2018	I fatti vostri	Rai 2	Presenter	
2018–2019	La palestra in casa (tutorial Pomeriggio Cinque)	Canale 5	Protagonist	

== Filmography ==
Year	Title	Role	Notes	Ref.
2008	Medici miei	Patient		
2009	La vita presa a calci			
2010	The Night of the Zombies	Vania	Co-leading role	
2010	Angel of Evil		Minor role	
2011	Agata e Simona	Simona	Short film; Lead role	
2012	Camera Café	Ingrid	Guest	
2016	Maremmamara	Marta		
2016	Il mondo di mezzo	Gaia	Lead role	
2017	Figli randagi		Lead role	

== Music videos ==
Year	Title	Ref.
2016	Jacky Greco feat. Snoop Dogg, Arlissa & JakkCity "Blow"	

== Others ==
Year	Title	Notes	Ref.
2016	A casa delle proff	ToTape channel co-founded and co-managed with Eleonora Cortini	
