= Pietro Pappagallo =

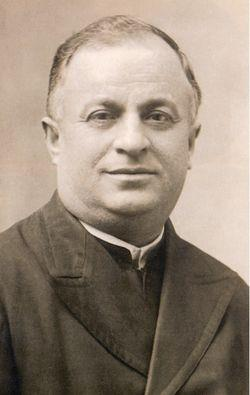
Don Pietro Pappagallo

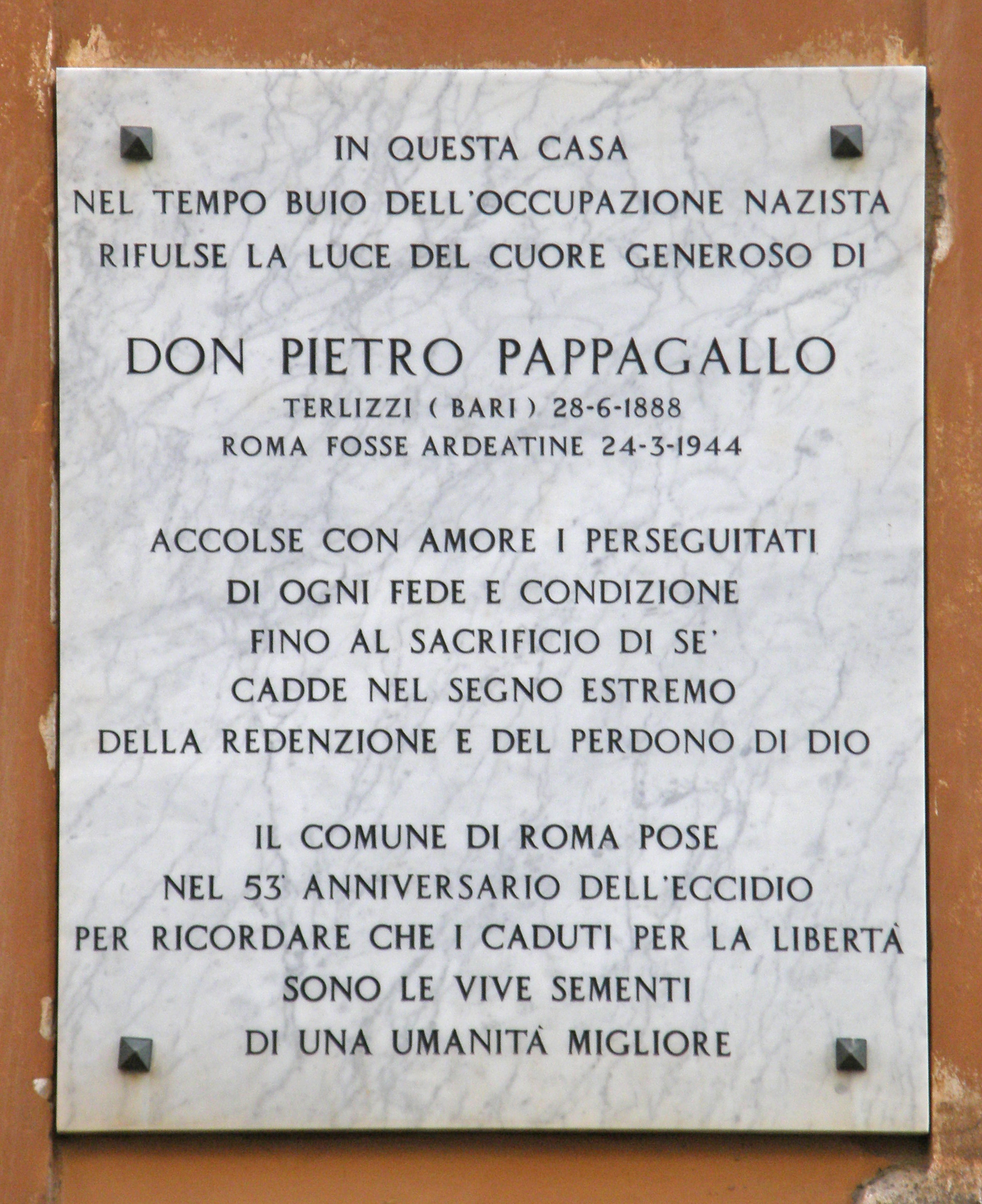
Plaque dedicated to Don Pietro Pappagallo, on the house in which he lived on the Via Urbana, Rome: IN THIS HOUSE IN THE DARK TIME OF THE NAZI OCCUPATION THERE SHONE THE LIGHT OF THE GENEROUS HEART OF DON PIETRO PAPPAGALLO TERLIZZI (BARI) 28·6·1888 ROME ARDEATINE CAVES 24·3·1944 HE RECEIVED WITH LOVE THE PERSECUTED OF EVERY FAITH AND CONDITION UNTO THE SACRIFICE OF HIS OWN SELF HE FELL IN THE ULTIMATE SIGN OF REDEMPTION AND THE FORGIVENESS OF GOD THE CITY OF ROME ON THE 53RD ANNIVERSARY OF THE MASSACRE REMEMBERS THAT THOSE WHO DIED FOR FREEDOM ARE THE LIVING SEEDS OF A BETTER HUMANITY

Pietro Pappagallo (28 June 1888 – 24 March 1944) was a Catholic priest and an Italian anti-fascist who assisted victims of Nazism and Fascism in Rome during World War II.

== Biography ==
Pappagallo was born on 28 June 1888 in Terlizzi, Bari, Italy. After coming to Rome in 1925, he was a member of the College of Beneficed Clergy of the Basilica of Santa Maria Maggiore and chaplain to the Sisters of the Child Jesus on the Via Urbana. He was also assistant pastor of the Basilica of St. John Lateran and had served as secretary to Cardinal Bonaventura Cerretti, the Archpriest of Santa Maria Maggiore.

During the German occupation of Rome, which lasted from September 1943 to June 1944, Pappagallo helped soldiers, partisans, allies, Jews and others wanted by the regime. Betrayed by a German spy Gino Crescentini, Pappagallo was arrested on 29 January 1944 by the SS, as part of a campaign against the Roman resistance. Witnesses reported that Pappagallo shared his meals with fellow prisoners who had not received food. Sentenced to death, he was executed on 24 March 1944 at the Ardeatine Caves, Rome.

== Recognition ==
- Pope John Paul II in Jubilee year of 2000 included Pietro Pappagallo among the Church's twentieth-century martyrs.
- On 13 July 1998 the President of the Italian Republic Carlo Azeglio Ciampi awarded Pappagallo posthumously the Medaglia d'oro al merito civile (Gold medal for civil merit), whose citation stated: "As a priest of the Diocese of Rome, during the German occupation he worked zealously in the clandestine struggle and gave himself generously to aid Jews, deserters, anti-fascists, and allies in flight, helping them hide and refresh themselves. Betrayed, he was handed over to the Germans, sacrificing his life with the serenity of the soul, a sign of the faith that had always lighted his way."
- On May 22, 2018, Yad Vashem recognised Pietro Pappagallo as Righteous Among the Nations.

== Bibliography ==
- Paolo Vallarelli Dove giocano gli Angeli Surico Editore Modugno: Bari 2009.

== Filmography ==
- Roberto Rossellini's seminal neorealist film Rome, Open City (1945) portrayed Don Pietro Pappagallo in the character of Don Pietro Pellegrini, played by Aldo Fabrizi.
- A 2006 RAI television drama La buona battaglia:Don Pietro Pappagallo dramatized his story directly. Pappagallo was played by Flavio Insinna.
