= La buona battaglia – Don Pietro Pappagallo =

2006 television film

- Written by: Stefano Gabrini; Furio Scarpelli
- Directed by: Gianfranco Albano
- Starring: Flavio Insinna; Ana Caterina Morariu; Paolo Briguglia; Paola Tiziana Cruciani; Ignazio Oliva; Max Mazzotta
- Country of origin: Italy
- Original language: Italian
- No. of seasons: 1
- No. of episodes: 2

Original release
- Network: Rai
- Release: 23 April 2006

La buona battaglia – Don Pietro Pappagallo is an Italian television miniseries (two-part TV film) based on the true story of Don Pietro Pappagallo (1888–1944), a Catholic priest and Italian anti-fascist who assisted victims of Nazism and Fascism in Rome during World War II and was arrested and executed in the Ardeatine Caves massacre on March 24, 1944.

It was produced by 11 Marzo Cinematografica and Rai Fiction, directed by Gianfranco Albano, written by Stefano Gabrini and Furio Scarpelli, and stars Flavio Insinna as Don Pietro. It was first released in 2006 and is distributed by Radiotelevisione Italiana and RaiTrade.

== Plot ==
In part one, Don Pietro (Flavio Insinna) gives refuge from the Nazis to Lidia (Ana Caterina Morariu) and Mario (Paolo Briguglia). We meet Teresa (Paola Tiziana Cruciani), Don Pietro's no-nonsense housekeeper; Gioacchino (Ignazio Oliva), a professor, former pupil, and good friend of Don Pietro's; and Oscar (Max Mazzotta), a transient visitor. Don Pietro accompanies a Jewish physician and young mother to San Paolo, a safe haven from the regime.

In part two, Lidia and Mario fall in love and plan to get married. Oscar betrays Don Pietro. The Nazi SS storm the refuge and arrest Don Pietro and friends. Don Pietro and Gioacchino are among the 335 men executed at the Ardeatine Caves.

The overall message of this film is that Don Pietro could have fled to San Paolo when he had the chance, but, like St. Peter, he came back to help any more people from being deported to the Nazi concentration camps. And like Judas betraying Jesus, Oscar betrayed Don Pietro by telling the Nazis where he lived. But Oscar got his rightful punishment when Gioacchino's men found him and threw him off a second floor balcony.

== Cast ==
- Flavio Insinna as Don Pietro
- Ana Caterina Morariu as Lidia
- Paolo Briguglia as Mario
- Paola Tiziana Cruciani as Teresa
- Ignazio Oliva as Gioacchino
- Max Mazzotta as Oscar
