= Francesca Fialdini =

Italian television and radio host (born 1979)

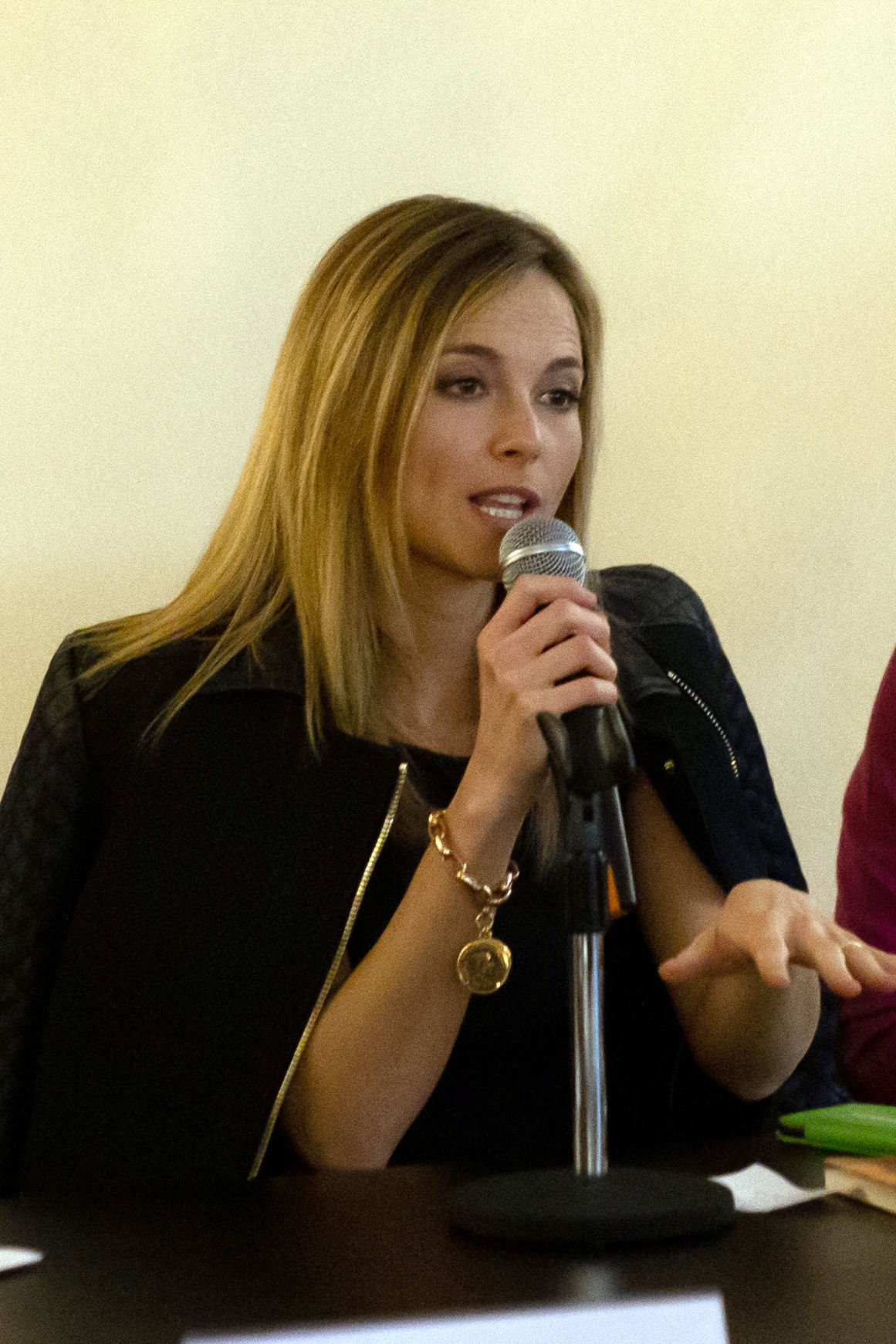
- Born: 11 October 1979 (age 46); Massa, Italy
- Education: Sapienza University of Rome
- Occupation: Television host
- Height: 1.70 m (5 ft 7 in)
- Awards: Knight of the Order of Merit of the Italian Republic (7 March 2019)

Francesca Fialdini Cavaliere OMRI (born 11 October 1979) is an Italian television and radio host.

== Biography ==
After graduating in Communication Sciences from the Sapienza University of Rome, Fialdini began her career working in radio as a collaborator for the foreign editorial staff and as a news anchor on Vatican Radio in 2004. From 2005 to September 2013 she worked as correspondent and anchorwoman for the news in the program A sua immagine, broadcast on Rai 1. From 2008 to 2012 she leads Videozine, column of cinema and TV series on Fox. Since January 2010 she has presented the literary culture program Cultbook - Storie on Rai 2, since July of the same year she has been leading, together with Roberto Zampa, the radio program Un'estate fa on Rai Radio 1. Since November 2012 she has been a correspondent for the weekly program Fictionmania, broadcast on Rai Premium. In July 2012 she presented the Premio Strega alongside Luca Salerno on Rai 1 and in January 2013 she joined Fabio Volo in the conduction of the last 8 episodes of Volo in diretta on Rai 3. On 13 March 2013 she presented the weekly column of cinema Moviextra, aired on Rai Movie. In July that year she presented the first two episodes of Movie Talk, the talk version of the column Movie Drugstore, on Rai Movie.

Since October 2013 she hosted alongside Tiberio Timperi Unomattina in famiglia on Rai 1. In the following season she hosted Unomattina alongside Franco Di Mare for three consecutive seasons. From 2016 to 2018, together with Alberto Matano, she hosted from Sorrento three editions of the Biagio Agnes Award, an award for journalism. In November 2016 she published the novel Il sogno di un venditore di accendini (The dream of a lighter salesman) for the publisher Città Nuova and since the 19th of the same month she hosted the 59th edition of the Zecchino d'Oro together with Giovanni Caccamo, then again in novembre del 2017. Between 2017/2018 she hosted La vita in diretta, alongside Marco Liorni. She is confirmed at the helm of the program also in the 2018/2019 season, alongside Tiberio Timperi. In the summer of 2018 she hosted together with Angela Rafanelli on Rai 3 the program In viaggio con lei, while in November of the same year she is again the hostess of the Zecchino d'Oro, always on air on Rai 1 and now in its 61st edition.

Between 2019/2020 she hosted the special of Rai 1 Tutti a Scuola, as well as Da noi...a ruota libera. In November 2019, due to the italian informational holiday: "Research Week" in favor of AIRC she hosted on Rai 3 with Michele Mirabella the special evening Conta su di Noi. In May 2020 she hosted in the late evening on Rai 3 Fame d'amore, a tv show made up of 4 episodes that follows the daily life of a group of boys with eating disorders and their path of care within a community. In June of the same year she hosted on Rai Storia the itinerant program È l'Italia, Bellezza!, while in July, on Rai 3, she hosted the program Così è la vita!.

Between 2020/2021 she is reconfirmed at the helm of Da noi... a ruota libera, in the Sunday afternoon of Rai 1, and in the second season of Fame d'amore, in the late evening on Rai 3. From 19 September 2020 to 13 December 2020 she hosted on Rai Radio 2 Milledonne e un uomo together with Franz Coriasco on the air on Saturdays from 18:00 to 19:30, while from 9 January 2021 she has been at the helm of Radio 2 a ruota libera together with Max Novaresi on the air on Saturdays from 18:00 to 19:30. On Saturday 13 March 2021, on Rai 3 in prime time, she hosted a special episode of Fame d'amore (on the occasion of the world day dedicated to eating disorders).

In 2021 she was reconfirmed for the third consecutive year at the conduction of Da noi... a ruota libera, in the Sunday afternoon on Rai 1, as the host of the third season of Fame d'amore, in the late evening on Rai 3 and of the radio program Radio 2 A ruota libera (Freewheeling) together with Valerio Scarponi on air on Saturday from 18:00 to 10:30 on RaiRadio2.

== TV shows ==
- A sua immagine (Rai 1, 2005–2013)
- Videozine (Fox, 2008–2012)
- Cultbook – Storie (Rai 2, 2010–2012)
- Fictionmania (Rai Premium, 2012–2014) correspondent
- Premio Strega (Rai 1, 2012)
- Volo in diretta (Rai 3, 2013)
- Moviextra (Rai Movie, 2013–2014)
- Movie Talk (Rai Movie, 2013)
- Cine Talk (Rai Movie, 2013–2014)
- Unomattina in famiglia (Rai 1, 2013–2014)
- Unomattina (Rai 1, 2014–2017)
- Zecchino d'Oro (Rai 1, 2016–2018)
- La partita del cuore (Rai 1, 2016)
- Premio Biagio Agnes (Rai 1, 2016–2018)
- Concerto di Natale dal Senato (Rai 1, 2016–2017)
- La vita in diretta (Rai 1, 2017–2019)
- 60 Zecchini (Rai 1, 2017) oather
- In viaggio con lei (Rai 3, 2018)
- Tutti a scuola (Rai 1, 2019)
- Da noi... a ruota libera (Rai 1, dal 2019)
- Conta su di noi – Speciale AIRC (Rai 3, 2019)
- Telethon (Rai 1, 2019–2020)
- Fame d'amore (Rai 3, dal 2020)
- È l'Italia, Bellezza! (Rai Storia, 2020)
- Così è la vita (Rai 3, 2020)
- Speciale Fame d'amore (Rai 3, 2021)

== Radio ==
- Radiogiornale (Radio Vaticana, 2004)
- Un'estate fa (Rai Radio 1, 2010)
- Milledonne e un uomo (Rai Radio 2, 2020)
- Radio 2 a ruota libera (Rai Radio 2, dal 2021)

== Filmography ==
=== Television ===
- Un passo dal cielo, directed by Riccardo Donna – TV series, episode 5x02 (2019)

== Books ==
- Il sogno di un venditore di accendini, Città Nuova, 2016
- Charlie e l'ocarina, Paoline Editoriale Libri, 2019

== Awards ==
- 2015 – Grand Prix Corallo, Alghero
- 2016 – Premio Internazionale di giornalismo di Ischia, Lacco Ameno
  - Special mention
