= Ice on Fire (2006 film) =

2006 film

- Directed by: Umberto Marino
- Written by: Umberto Marino
- Starring: Raoul Bova; Donatella Finocchiaro
- Cinematography: Alessio Gelsini Torresi
- Release date: 10 March 2006
- Running time: 104 minutes
- Country: Italy
- Language: Italian

Ice on Fire (Italian: La fiamma sul ghiaccio) is a 2006 Italian romantic drama film directed by Umberto Marino. It was entered into the 28th Moscow International Film Festival.

== Cast ==
- Lucia Antonia
- Raoul Bova as Fabrizio
- Paolo Calabresi
- Stefano Corsi
- Donatella Finocchiaro as Caterina
- Max Giusti as Mario
- Simona Nasi
- Francesca Vettori
