= Veronica Maya =

Italian actress and television host (born 1977)

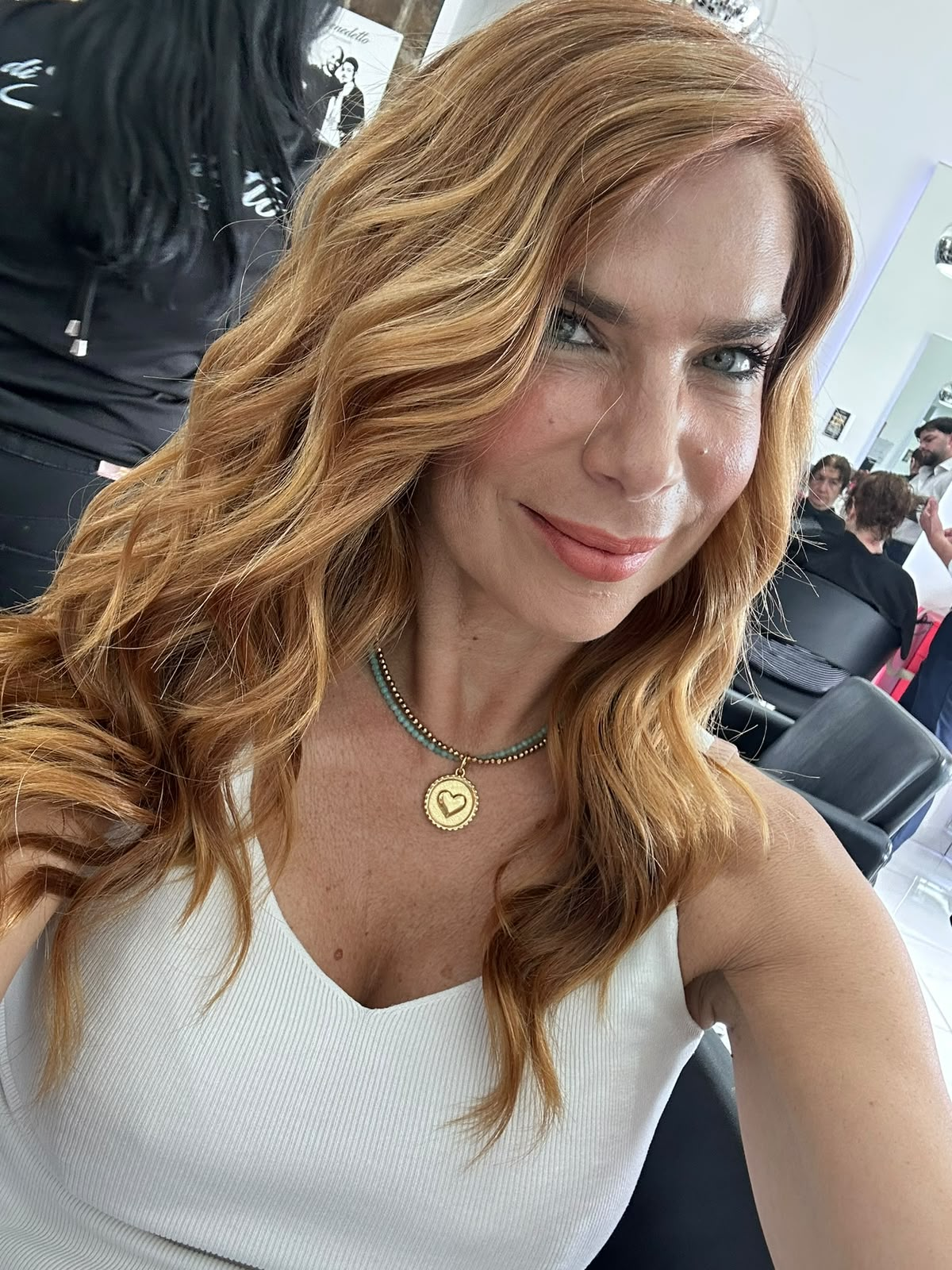
- Born: Veronica Maya Russo; 14 July 1977 (age 48); Paris, France
- Occupations: Actress; TV host; Model
- Years active: 2002–present
- Height: 177 cm (5 ft 10 in)
- Children: 3

Veronica Maya Russo (born 14 July 1977 in Paris) is a French-born Italian actress and television personality best known for her performances in film and television.

== Life and career ==
Veronica Maya Russo was born in Paris in 1977 in the hospital of the Hôtel-Dieu in Paris. She stayed until 1982 in the 4th arrondissement, before settling in Piano di Sorrento where her parents, Raffaele and Eleonora Di Maio (theater director), ran a restaurant. At the age of 20, she graduated and subsequently received a scholarship to the Renato Greco school in Rome, where she made her debut as a stage actress acting in several musicals.

In 2002, she made her theater debut in a play directed by Mario Monicelli inspired by the movie My Friends. His television debut dates back to the early 2000s when he hosted, alongside Guido De Angelis, the show dedicated to the Lazio Sports Society, Lazialità in TV, broadcast by the Roman channel Teleroma 56.

In the summer of 2007, she was invited to film the summer version of Unomattina with Duilio Giammaria. Since June 1, 2020, she is present on Rai, more specifically on Rai 2, and for the whole summer, she hosts the show L'Italia che fa in the afternoon.

== Filmography ==
- Italian Business (2017)
- Passpartù: Operazione Doppiozero (2019)
- Magari resto (2020)
- Ed è subito commedia (2023)
