= Amadeus (presenter) =

Italian television and radio presenter (born 1962)

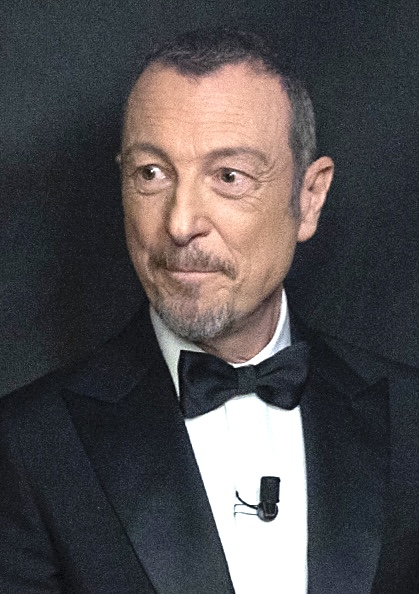
- Sebastiani in 2023
- Born: Amedeo Umberto Rita Sebastiani; 4 September 1962 (age 63); Ravenna, Italy
- Occupations: Television presenter; radio presenter; disc jockey
- Employer(s): Mediaset (2006–2008) RAI (1999–2006; 2009–2024) Warner Bros. Discovery (2024–)

Amedeo Umberto Rita Sebastiani (born 4 September 1962), known professionally as Amadeus (pronounced [amaˈdɛus]), is an Italian television host and radio presenter.

== Life and career ==
Born in Ravenna to Sicilian parents, Sebastiani grew up in Verona. He started his career in 1979 as a deejay for a small radio station in Verona after a successful audition.

One day in 1985, Sebastiani spent six hours outside a hotel to lend Vittorio Salvetti, Italian television producer, a VHS with his audition. Salvetti then got him in touch with talent scout Claudio Cecchetto, to which Sebastiani recorded and sent a demo cassette. The talent scout gave him a chance in 1986 and made him debut for Radio DeeJay with the stage name "Amadeus", basing it off of Rock Me Amadeus, 1985 single by Falco. Over the next two years he became one of the main radio presenters for Radio Capital Music Network, where he co-hosted many programmes with Luca Laurenti among mang others. He made his television debut in 1988, appearing in the Radio DeeJay spin-off DeeJay Television on Italia 1.

His debut on a RAI network was in 1999 as a quality juror for Sanremo Music Festival 1999. In September of that year he became the host of Domenica In for the next season. In October 2000, Quiz Show premiered on Rai 1 with him as the host. The game later rebranded to L'eredità, which he kept hosting until he briefly quit Rai in 2006.

During his career, Amadeus hosted several high-profile programmes, both for RAI and Mediaset, including five editions of Festivalbar, four seasons of L'eredità, the Sanremo Music Festival (2020 to 2024), L'anno che verrà, and several early evening quiz shows.

In April 2024, he left Rai at the end of his contract and signed a four-year deal with Warner Bros. Discovery. His final appearances for Rai included Una. Nessuna. Centomila – in Arena, Viva Rai2! hosted by Fiorello, and Affari tuoi (English: "Your Business"), the Italian version of Deal or No Deal.

On Nove, he launched Suzuki Music Party, the quiz show Chissà chi è and La Corrida – Dilettanti allo sbaraglio, and also hosted the 2024 SIAE Music Awards. In 2025, he joined the jury of Amici di Maria De Filippi on Canale 5 before returning to Nove in May to present Like a Star, the Italian version of Starstruck, which was followed in June by The Cage – Prendi e scappa.

=== Personal life ===
Between 1993 and 2007, Sebastiani was married to Marisa Di Martino. They have a daughter, Alice Vittoria, born in 1997.

In 2003, after separating from his first wife, Sebastiani began a relationship with the showgirl Giovanna Civitillo, whom he had met while working at L'eredità.

In January 2009, Sebastiani and Giovanna had a son, José Alberto, named after José Mourinho, who at the time was coaching Inter Milan – the team Sebastiani supports. The couple married later that year.

== Television ==
Year	Title	Role	Notes
1988–1989	1, 2, 3 Jovanotti	Co-host	Musical programme
1989–1990	Deejay Beach	Presenter	Musical programme (seasons 3–4)
1993	Festivalbar 1993	Co-host	Annual music festival
1994	Festivalbar 1994	Presenter	Annual music festival
1995	Festivalbar 1995	Presenter	Annual music festival
1995–1996	Buona Domenica	Co-host	Variety show (season 8)
1996	Festivalbar 1996	Presenter	Annual music festival
1996–1997	Campioni di ballo	Presenter	Talent show (season 2)
1997	Festivalbar 1997	Presenter	Annual music festival
1997	Matricole	Co-host	Docuseries (season 1)
1998	Il Quizzone	Presenter	Game show (season 5)
1998	Meteore – Alla ricerca delle stelle perdute	Co-host	Variety show (season 1)
1999	Festa di classe	Presenter	Variety show
1999–2000	Domenica in	Presenter	Variety show (season 24)
2000	In bocca al lupo!	Presenter	Game show (season 3)
2000–2002	Quiz Show	Presenter	Game show
2001	Castrocaro Music Festival 2001	Presenter	Annual music festival
2002	Azzardo	Presenter	Game show (season 1)
2002–2006	L'eredità	Presenter	Game show (seasons 1–4)
2003	La partita del cuore	Presenter	Annual charity sports event
2003	Miss Italia nel Mondo	Presenter	Annual beauty contest
2004	Music Farm	Presenter	Talent/reality show (season 1)
2006	Formula segreta	Presenter	Game show
2007–2008	1 contro 100	Presenter	Game show
2007–2008	Canta e Vinci	Co-host	Game show
2009	Fiore e Tinelli	Himself	TV series (episode "Quiz in famiglia")
2009–2016	Mezzogiorno in famiglia	Presenter	Variety show (seasons 17–23)
2010	Cuore di mamma	Presenter	Reality show
2013	Altrimenti ci arrabbiamo	Contestant	Talent show
2013	Tale e quale show	Contestant	Talent show (season 3)
2014–2017	Reazione a catena	Presenter	Game show (seasons 8–11)
2014; 2016	Colors	Presenter	Game show
2015	Techetechetè	Guest	Archive footage/variety show
2015–2018	Stasera tutto è possibile	Presenter	Game show (seasons 1–4)
2015–2023	L'anno che verrà	Presenter	New Year's Eve special (8 specials)
2016	Sanremo Giovani	Judge	Annual music festival
2016–2017	Music Quiz	Presenter	Game show
2017–2023	Soliti ignoti – Il ritorno	Presenter	Game show (seasons 6–12)
2018–2019	Ora o mai più	Presenter	Talent show
2019	Ballata per Genova	Co-host	Special
2019–2024	Sanremo Giovani	Presenter	Talent show
2020	Sanremo Music Festival 2020	Presenter and artistic director	Annual music festival
2021	Sanremo Music Festival 2021	Presenter and artistic director	Annual music festival
2021–2023	Arena Suzuki	Presenter	Music variety show
2022	Sanremo Music Festival 2022	Presenter and artistic director	Annual music festival
2022	Affari tuoi – Formato famiglia	Presenter	Game show
2023	Sanremo Music Festival 2023	Presenter and artistic director	Annual music festival
2023–2024	Affari tuoi	Presenter	Game show (season 15–16)
2024	Sanremo Music Festival 2024	Presenter and artistic director	Annual music festival
2025	Amici di Maria De Filippi	Judge	Talent show (season 24; final stage only)

== Filmography ==
Year	Title	Role	Notes
1993	Laura non-c'è	Doctor	Feature film debut
2003	Il pranzo della domenica	Himself	Cameo appearance
2023	Wish	Valentino	Italian voice-over
