= Flavio Insinna =

Italian actor and television presenter (born 1965)

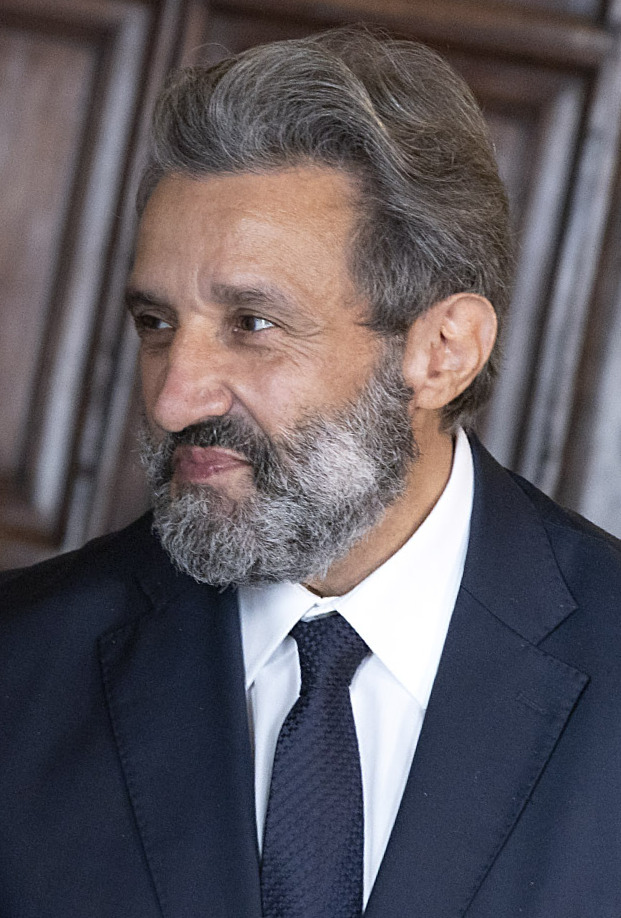
- Insinna in 2022
- Born: Flavio Emanuele Insinna; 3 July 1965 (age 61); Rome, Italy
- Occupations: Actor; television presenter
- Years active: 1990–present
- Television: Don Matteo; Affari tuoi; L'eredità
- Awards: See below

Flavio Insinna (born 3 July 1965) is an Italian actor and television presenter. He is a former host of L'eredità. He is also known for having hosted Affari Tuoi, the Italian version of Deal or No Deal between 2006 and 2008 and then again between 2013 and 2017.

== Biography ==
In 1986, after trying unsuccessfully to join the Carabinieri (the Italian gendarmerie), he enrolled in Alessandro Fersen's drama school. In 1990, he graduated from the "Laboratorio di esercitazioni sceniche" (Italian for "Laboratory of scenic exercises"), run by Gigi Proietti in Rome.

One of his most popular roles was Flavio Anceschi, a captain in the Carabinieri, which he played for five seasons in the hit television series Don Matteo on RAI with Terence Hill and Nino Frassica. He subsequently starred in two other RAI fictions, Don Bosco and Don Pappagallo (one of the 335 victims of the massacre at the Fosse Ardeatine in March 1944).

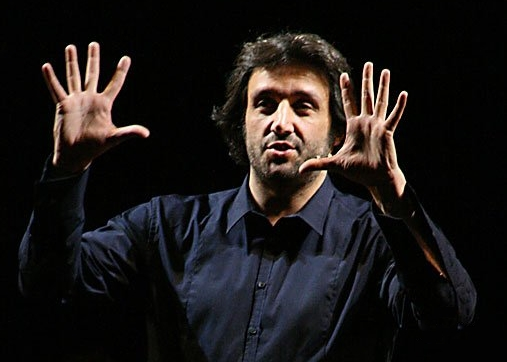
Insinna in 2008

In the summer of 2006, Insinna worked in the sitcom Cotti e mangiati (Italian for "Cooked and eaten"). In September of the same year, he made his debut as the host of the prime-time game show Affari Tuoi (Italian version of the American Deal or No Deal) on RaiUno. The broadcast was highly rated and managed to top the competitor in its time slot Striscia la notizia. This gave a rebirth to the popularity of the show, which had had some audience share issues before Insinna. As a result of this success, he received critical acclaim, thanks to which he was awarded a Telegatto on 27 January 2007 for "Best New Personality" of 2006. Again in 2007, Insinna took part as a guest on the final evening of the Sanremo music festival. After two successful seasons, he left Affari Tuoi in June 2008 to devote himself to the theatre.

In 2008, Insinna started playing the title role in the shoes of Commissioner Santamaria Diego in the TV series RAI Ho sposato uno sbirro, a role he kept for two seasons. In 2009, he starred in Many Kisses Later, directed by Fausto Brizzi. In the same year, he also participated as a dancer for a night in the second episode of the fifth edition of the Rai Uno broadcast Ballando con le Stelle. He also read the lyrics of Mango's song Gli amori son finestre for the realisation of the homonymous CD.

In 2011, Insinna hosted the historic broadcast La Corrida (Italian for "The Bullfighting") on Canale 5, personal debut on Mediaset. In May of that year, after the death of his father, he temporarily retired from the scene because he was not up for making people laugh.

Insinna wrote a book, Neanche con un morso all'orecchio (Italian for "Not even with an ear bite"), released on 21 February 2012, which was reprinted four times in a few weeks. In the same year, he hosted Canale 5's Il braccio e la mente (Italian for "The brains and the brawn"). Since 15 September 2012, he hosted the radio broadcast Per favore parlate al conducente (Italian for "Please talk with the driver"), written by Marco Presta and Franco Bertini, aired on Radiodue on Saturdays and Sundays. On 15 December of that year, he returned to host a RAI broadcast on RAI 1, the charity "marathon" Telethon.

On 8 September 2013, Insinna was back to host Affari Tuoi. The broadcast was able to prevail on Striscia la notizia on a daily basis. On 22 November of the same year, he participated as a juror in the TV broadcast Tale e quale show (Italian for "Spitting images show"). On 30 November 2013, Insinna was again a dancer for one night in Ballando con le Stelle, paired with Elena Coniglio: the duo danced a tango that got huge success, leading the jury to award Insinna and Coniglio with the maximum marks (50 points).

From 2018 to 2023, Insinna hosted L'eredità on Rai Uno.

== Filmography ==
=== Films ===
Film roles showing year released, title, role played, director and notes
Year	Title	Role	Director	Notes
1992	Gole ruggenti	Journalist	Pier Francesco Pingitore	Uncredited cameo
1998	Children of Hannibal	Orfeo	Davide Ferrario	
1998	Un bugiardo in paradiso	Mino	Enrico Oldoini	
1999	Guardami	Flavio	Davide Ferrario	
2000	Johnny the Partisan	Spy	Guido Chiesa	Cameo appearance
2000	Nightwatchman	Salvatore Russo	Francesco Calogero	
2001	The Comeback	Bolognesi	Franco Angeli	
2003	Facing Windows	Baker	Ferzan Özpetek	Cameo appearance
2003	Tutto in quella notte	Giorgio	Franco Bertini	
2006	Basette	Inspector	Gabriele Mainetti	Short film
2009	Many Kisses Later	Father Lorenzo	Fausto Brizzi	
2013	Pazze di me	Andrea's father	Fausto Brizzi	
2013	White as Milk, Red as Blood	Ettore	Giacomo Campiotti	
2014	Big Hero 6	Baymax (voice)	Don Hall, Chris Williams	Italian voice-over role
2015	Il professor Cenerentolo	Prison's officer	Leonardo Pieraccioni	Cameo appearance
2019	Se mi vuoi bene	Edoardo	Fausto Brizzi	

=== Television ===
Television roles showing year released, title, role played, network and notes
Year	Title	Role	Network	Notes
1996	Uno di noi	Young man	Rai 1	Unknown episode
2000	Distretto di Polizia	Luigi Falliero	Canale 5	Guest role (season 1); 2 episodes
2000	Padre Pio: Miracle Man	Padre Paolino	Canale 5	Miniseries
2000–2006; 2021	Don Matteo	Captain Flavio Anceschi	Rai 1	Main role (seasons 1–5), guest (season 13); 97 episodes
2001	Angelo il custode	Robber	Rai 1	Episode: "L'ostaggio"
2001	La crociera	Eros	Rai 1	Miniseries
2003	Maria Goretti	Father Basilio	Rai 1	Television movie
2004	Saint John Bosco: Mission to Love	John Bosco	Rai 1	Miniseries
2005	Meucci: L'italiano che inventò il telefono	Lorenzo Salvi	Rai 1	Miniseries
2005	Imperium: Saint Peter	Davide	Rai 1	Miniseries
2005	Camera Café	Himself	Italia 1	Episode: "L'autista"
2006	La buona battaglia - Don Pietro Pappagallo	Don Pietro	Rai 1	Miniseries
2006–2008	Cotti e mangiati	Franco Mancini	Rai 1	Lead role; 102 episodes
2006–2017	Affari tuoi	Himself/ Host	Rai 1	Game show (seasons 4–5, 11–14)
2008–2010	Ho sposato uno sbirro	Diego	Rai 1	Main role; 34 episodes
2011	La Corrida	Himself/ Host	Canale 5	Talent show (season 19)
2011	Eroi per caso	Cesare Magnozzi	Rai 1	Miniseries
2012	Il braccio e la mente	Himself/ Host	Canale 5	Game show
2014	La pista	Himself/ Host	Rai 1	Talent dance show
2015–2016	Boss in incognito	Himself/ Host	Rai 2	Reality show (season 3)
2016	La classe degli asini	Felice Giuliano	Rai 1	Television movie
2016	Dieci cose	Himself/ Host	Rai 1	Variety show
2016–2017, 2019	Eurovision Song Contest	Himself/ Speaker	YouTube	Annual music contest
2017	Dopo Fiction	Himself/ Co-host	Rai 1	Variety show
2017–2018	Cartabianca	Himself/ Reporter	Rai 3	Talk show (season 2)
2017–2019	Prodigi: La musica è vita	Himself/ Host	Rai 1	Talent show (seasons 2–4)
2018	Il supplente	Himself/ Guest	Rai 2	Episode: "Episode 3"
2018–2023	L'eredità	Himself/ Host	Rai 1	Game show (seasons 17–21)
2019–2020	Una voce per Padre Pio	Himself/ Host	Rai 1	Musical program (seasons 20–21)
2020–2021	Il cantante mascherato	Himself/ Judge	Rai 1	Talent show (seasons 1–2)
2021	A grande richiesta	Himself/ Guest host	Rai 1	Variety show (2nd episode)
2021	Il pranzo è servito	Himself/ Host	Rai 1	Game show (season 12)
2022	A muso duro - Campioni di vita	Antonio Maglio	Rai 1	Television film
2024	Famiglie d'Italia	Himself/ Host	La7	Game show

== Theatre ==
- 1986: Certamen Vaticanum
- 1987: Uccidiamo il chiaro di luna
- 1988: Folli sempre folli fortissimamente folli
- 1990: Il desiderio preso per la coda
- 1990: Che tragedia
- 1990: Lighea
- 1990: Tosca
- 1991: Madre coraggio
- 1992: Rimozioni forzate
- 1992: Il campanile
- 1993: A qualcuno piace caldo
- 1994: Sotterraneo
- 1994: Il tramezzo
- 1995: L'inno dell'ultimo anno
- 1995: Guardiano di porci
- 1995: Radio estetica
- 1996: Rassegna di monologhi inediti
- 1997: Tunnel
- 1997: La banda
- 1997: Fegatelli

== Awards ==
- 2001 - special award: Prima - Italian guide to actors for his part in the film Guardami;
- 2004 - award Telegrolla and Premio per l'Europa for his part in the TV series Don Bosco, awarded at the Salerno Film and Fiction festival and Premio internazionale Sant'Antonio for his part as Capitano Anceschi in Don Matteo;
- 2006 - Premio internazionale Flaiano, Premio di cultura "Città di Marinella" and Telegrolla for the fictional series La buona battaglia - Don Pietro Pappagallo, Cinema and Theatre award Apoxiomeno filippese for the show Don Matteo;
- 2008 - Rome Fiction Festival - Award for best male protagonist for Ho Sposato Uno Sbirro.

== Controversy ==
=== Neanche con un morso all'orecchio ===
In his book Neanche con un morso all'orecchio (Italian for "Not even with an ear bite"), released on 21 February 2012, Insinna blamed the nurse that had prevented him from visiting his dying father during the latter's hospitalisation. Actually, the access had been denied as the hospital regulations require a maximum of two people per ICU room, being Insinna's mother and sister were already in the room. In particular, the author included a chapter entitled "L'infermiera stronza" (Italian for "The bitch nurse"), where he wrote:

[L'infermiera] guarda e parla con l'inevitabile rabbia che hanno a volte in corpo le donne basse, bruttine e con gli occhiali.
(Insinna, Nemmeno con un morso all'orecchio, page 84)

— [The nurse] looks and talks with the inevitable anger that small, ugly women with glasses have sometimes inside.

Besides, Insinna inserted an unfortunate story about what he would have done to that nurse in the following chapter "Vedrai che andrà tutto bene" (Italian for "It'll be fine"):

[L'infermiera] arriva alla sua auto, apre lo sportello e non fa in tempo a salire, arrivo da dietro, la prendo per il collo e le sbatto la faccia contro la sua automobilina nuova nuova, comprata in sedici comode rate. Perde sangue dal naso, ma non è svenuta. La giro verso di me, perché mi guardi dritto in faccia. "Oh, mi senti, mi senti? Allora senti bene brutta testa di cazzo, non ti azzardare mai più a lasciarmi fuori dalla stanza di mio padre. Il regolamento te lo ficchi dritto su per il culo e vedrai che provi anche un po’ di piacere. Mio padre sta male, hai capito? Sta male. Ce l’hai un padre? Ce l'hai o ti hanno creato in laboratorio alla fine di un esperimento poco riuscito? Allora ce l'hai? Rispondi brutta nana stronza! (...) E se provi a denunciarmi io domani torno e ti ammazzo con le mie mani. E giuro che lo faccio!"
(Insinna, Nemmeno con un morso all'orecchio, page 88)

— [The nurse] gets to her car, opens the door and doesn't have the time to get on, I arrive from behind, grab her neck and slam her face into her new new little car, bought in sixteen easy payments. She's bleeding from the nose, but she hasn't fainted. I make her turn to me, so that she can look right at my face. "Oh, you hear me, you hear me? Now listen to me you fucking asshole, don't you dare leave me out of my father's room ever again. Shove the regulations up the ass and you'll see that you can even enjoy it a little bit. My father is sick, you understand? He's sick. Do you have a father? You got one or did someone create you in a laboratory at the end of a failed experiment? You got one? Answer to me ugly bitch dwarf! (...) And if you try to denounce me, I'll come back tomorrow and I'll murder you with my hands. And I swear I'll do it!"

Similar words caused huge controversy. During an interview to the weekly magazine Oggi, Insinna fought back stating "I meant every word".

Later in 2017, Striscia la notizia broadcast a TV report about this topic, underlining the violent and misogynistic tone Insinna used in his book, worsened by the fact that the author had certainly pondered those words, talking about "bullying, a violence against women that goes so far as to femicide".

=== Affari tuoi ===
In 2017 Striscia la notizia broadcast a TV report aimed at exposing Insinna's duplicity, showing the host talking off the air while recording some episodes of Affari tuoi. Insinna was caught blaming, insulting and offending, directly or indirectly, some of his collaborators and some of the contestants.

In a leaked tape of 25 September 2014, a fuming Insinna scurrilously complained about the "box X", a special option of the game, which he considered completely useless.

Fidatevi, senti uno stronzo una volta, la "X" non ci fa vincere le serate! Dai, adesso che mi avete fatto incazzare facciamo la puntata. (...) Non mi rompete più i coglioni con 'sta scatola! Non mi dite più di questa cazzo di scatola! Facciamo "Affari tuoi", la spacco 'sta cazzo di opzione! La brucio! (...) 'Sta scatola, 'sta scatola, 'sta scatola, la spacco! I pacchi sono venti, la "X" è una merda di opzione del cazzo, io adesso la levo! I pacchi, contano i pacchi! Il resto, la "X", ci piscio sopra!

— Trust me, listen to an asshole one time, the "X" cannot attract the evening audience for us! Come on, now that you pissed me off we can record the episode. (...) Don't bust my balls again with that box! Don't talk with me about that fucking box again! We are recording "Affari tuoi", I'll smash this fucking option! I'll burn it down! (...) This box, this box, this box, I'll smash it! There are twenty boxes, the "X" is a fucking shitty option, I'll eliminate it! The boxes, the boxes matter! The rest, the "X", I'll piss on it!

In a leaked tape of 7 February 2015, Insinna complained about the fact that he had no possibility of choosing the contestants of the episodes. In particular, he was furious at the contestant representing Aosta Valley, Maria Rosaria Seracusa.

Con questa rottura di cazzo, la regola, trentasette puntate, ma prendiamo cinque stronzi fatti bene! Cambiano la Costituzione, hanno truccato le votazioni per fare la Repubblica, se no rivotavano 'a Monarchia, non possiamo mettere dentro la busta cinque simpatici? Abbiamo preso cinque simpatici iellati. Una nana che parla con le mani davanti alla bocca, se no sta muta. (...) Quando li ho visti, sei di questi li avrei presi a zampate nel culo, perché c’è un Dio, vinci 20 centesimi perché sei moscio. (...) Cioè questa roba perché la fate tra di voi? Ma perché cazzo la fate tra di voi? Che cosa c'avete nel QI più de me? Ma perché? "Er concorrente, no, non te li famo vede', scegliamo noi", ma che cazzo scegliete? Ma ce devo gioca' io, la merce la lavoro io. Si fa una riunione: tu sei produttore, tu sei quel cazzo del capo del Cristo? Mi dici: "Alle 3 ci vediamo e si guardano quelli delle puntate"; e io te dico: "Questo è una merda, questo è una merda e questo è una merda!" (...) Due/tre fighi e sette dementi! Ma vattela a pija 'nder culo! Attaccate alle bretelle! Per farmici arrivare, ce ne vuole! Perché ti assicuro che io sono un uomo per bene e sono buono! Per farmi girare i coglioni proprio veramente, per farmeli girare, ce ne vuole, ce siete riusciti! (...) Una nana, una nana ha giocato! (...) La si porta di là, la si colpisce al basso ventre e le si dice: “Adesso tu rientri e giochi”, perché è Rai Uno, non è Val d’Aosta news, li mortacci tua! (...) Siamo riusciti a prendere degli stronzi, come sempre, a tutti gli speciali! Il nostro karma che ci insegue! (...) C'era l'orchestra, c'era la simpatia, un po' de bucio del culo, i soldi, i VIP, abbiamo preso una nana de merda che non parla! (...) Metti una foto piccola di quella stronza, così piccola, con scritto gigante che si accontenta presto e perde 150.000 Euro! (...) Poi oh, er programma è de tutti, eh! A me 'sti cazzi, a me 'sti cazzi! Se a voi ve va bene, me va bene pure a me! La mattina me avete rotto talmente er cazzo che va bene pure a me, però stasera avete toppato! (...) Cioè questa che più lunga abbiamo lo stronzo! Per quelle di mezz'ora famo i salti mortali, poi per quella de tre ore 'amo portato i figli del dio minore!

— With this pain in the ass, the rule, thirty-seven episodes, let's choose five proper assholes! [Politicians] change the Constitution, they rigged the vote to found the [Italian] Republic, otherwise Monarchy would have been voted, can't we write the names of five nice contestants in the envelopes? We have chosen five nice losers. A dwarf speaking with her hands over her mouth, otherwise she remains silent. (...) When I saw them, I would have kicked six of those guys' ass, because God exists, you win 20 cents because you're limp. (...) I mean, why do you do this thing you alone? Why do you fucking do this you alone? Do you have a higher IQ than mine? Why? "The contestants, no, we don't show them to you, we choose them ourselves", what the fuck do you choose? I have to play with them, I work with the materials. We should arrange a meeting: are you the producer, are you the fucking boss as Christ was? You tell me: "Let's see at 3 pm, we'll have a look at the contestants"; and I say: "This is shit, this is shit and this is shit!" (...) Two/three cool people and seven demented ones! Take it up the ass! Suck on that! It takes a lot to get me angry! Because I assure you that I'm a decent man and I'm nice! It takes a lot to piss me off seriously, you've succeeded in that! (...) A dwarf, a dwarf played! (...) One should bring her in there, hit her in the lower belly and say: "Now come back and play", because this is Rai Uno, this is not Aosta Valley news, you damn! (...) We managed to choose some bitches, as usual, in every special episode! This is our karma chasing us! There was the orchestra, there were the music, a little bit of fucking luck, the money, some VIP, we chose a shitty dwarf who doesn't speak! (...) Put there a small picture of her, as small as this, with a huge sign saying that she contents early in the game and loses 150.000 Euros! (...) Then the broadcast belongs to each of us! Who gives a shit, who gives a shit! If you're happy with that, I'm happy, too! In the morning you busted my balls so hard that it was fine, but this evening you failed! (...) A scumbag would have been taller than her! We bend over backwards for thirty-minute episodes, then we chose minor god's sons for the three-hour episode!

Following this TV report, Insinna generically apologised to the audience for his behaviour, fighting back that the person who had given the recorded files to Striscia la notizia was a betrayer and talking about "TV pornography to attract a little bit more audience".
Seracusa filed a complaint before the police headquarters of Aosta. After six months, she also stated that neither Insinna nor RAI had apologised directly to her yet.
Co.Ge.Di. International, the society owning Rocchetta, a water brand Insinna was testimonial of, sued the host, asking for more than 2 million Euros for contract violation, as Insinna had behaved contrary to the public morals. The society also fired Insinna, a decision the host appealed but an arbitration panel considered legit.

=== Prodigi: La musica è vita ===
On 14 November 2017, after the press conference held in Rome to present the TV broadcast Prodigi: La musica è vita, a night UNICEF was about to organise and Insinna to host, Insinna himself was caught arguing with the TvBlog journalist Massimo Galanto. In particular, the host accused Galanto to have called him "aged" and "recycled". The journalist denied the use of those words and the episode seemed to end that way. A few moments later, a UNICEF representative asked Galanto to shake hands with Insinna as a sign of reconciliation. After an initial resistance, Insinna accepted, commenting: "This is the last time you interview me but it's fine. Great. Oh, think about what you write because I have lawyers ready for everyone. Look, we've greeted definitively, thank you, forever".

=== L'eredità ===
==== Capital of Israel ====
During the 21 May 2020 episode of L'eredità, Insinna asked the capital of Israel to a contestant. Replying the latter Tel Aviv, Insinna corrected the contestant saying that the right answer was Jerusalem.
The lawyers Fausto Gianelli and Dario Rossi sued RAI on behalf of Associazione Palestinesi in Italia (Association of Palestinians in Italy) and Associazione benefica di solidarietà con il popolo Palestinese (Charity association for solidarity with Palestinian people).
During the 6 June 2020 episode, Insinna tried to take a step back, affirming that "one can unwillingly find himself in the middle of a controversy involving issues a game show shouldn't intervene in" and that "different opinions exist about the topic", specifying that the debated question was to be considered void for the game purposes.
The petitioners complained that there's no debate outside Israel about the fact that most of the international community doesn't consider Jerusalem as the capital of Israel. Consequently, they continued the action before the Court of Rome.
Considering that "it's common knowledge that on 21 December 2017 Italy voted in favour of the United Nations' resolution refusing USA's decision to recognise Jerusalem as the capital of Israel, as well as United Nations themselves repeatedly blamed Israeli occupation of Palestinian territory and East Jerusalem, denying the validity of Israel's decision to turn Jerusalem into their capital", being United Nations' decision directly applicable to Italian legislation, the Court of Rome, Person and Immigration Rights Section, completely agreed with the petitioners with its decision dated 3 August 2020 and registered as RG 31253/2020, forcing RAI to read the following statement during the next episode of L'eredità: "International law doesn't recognise Jerusalem as the capital of the State of Israel".
Notwithstanding, RAI appealed this decision. The Court of Rome, Eighteenth Civil Section, eventually decided that Insinna's rectification of 6 June 2020 was to be considered enough without further clarification with its decision dated 20 October 2020 and registered as RG 40043/2020.

==== Cavour ====
During the Christmas 2020 episode of L'eredità, Insinna read the following question: "In 1869, which sentence did Cavour pronounce to inform the Piedmont ambassador that Garibaldi had entered Neaples?" Many people, including Mario Adinolfi, noticed that the question contained a huge mistake, reacting ironically and polemically. Indeed, Cavour had died in 1861, consequently, the timing of the question was completely wrong. The Italian politician did say the line "I maccheroni sono cotti, e noi li mangeremo" (Italian for "Macaroni are ready, and we'll eat them"), the correct answer to the question, on 7 September 1860. Subsequently, Insinna apologised for that big mistake.

==== Hunting ====
During the 27 December 2020 episode of L'eredità, Insinna voiced opposition to hunting after reading a question about that topic. In particular, the host stated that “hunting is not a sport” and that he was “totally against hunting”.
Subsequently, Federcaccia (the Italian Federation of Hunting) reacted by writing a letter of complaint signed by its Director Massimo Buconi to RAI and to the related Parliament Commission, at the same time threatening to sue Insinna for defamation and inviting the audience to stop watching the TV broadcast.
Social media reaction was in favour of Insinna and people created the hashtag #iostoconflavioinsinna (Italian for “I’m with Flavio Insinna”) to support the host. The ENPA (National Entity for Animal Protection) and Greenpeace also sided with Insinna.

==== Italian military expenditure ====
During the 25 March 2022 episode of L'eredità, Insinna blamed the Parliament's decision to increase Italian military expenditure. Taking a cue from the solution to the final game, the word "Risparmio" ("Saving"), the host stated: "Don't get angry, in my opinion saving should concern military expenditure and we should build schools, hospitals, houses with that money". And again: "Tonight's word is Risparmio. In that case, I'm right. Saving must concern weapons."
Many critics followed Insinna's statements. Fratelli d'Italia senator Giovanbattista Fazzolari said: "The overpaid (with public money) TV host Flavio Insinna states he's contrary to military expenditure. Apparently, his jokes are enough to defend Italian borders and freedom in his opinion. Let's start saving his salary first."
