= L'eredità =

- Genre: Game show
- Created by: Amadeus; Stefano Santucci
- Directed by: Stefano Vicario (2002–2006); Maurizio Pagnussat (2006–2014); Sabrina Busiello (2014–2018); David Marcotulli (2018–2019); Paola Baccini (2019–2022); Luigi Rizza (2022–present); Salvatore Perfetto (L'Eredità Summer)
- Presented by: Amadeus (2002–2006); Carlo Conti (2006–2016; 2017–2018); Fabrizio Frizzi (2014–2018); Flavio Insinna (1 April 2015 episode; 2018–2023); Marco Liorni (2024–present)
- Country of origin: Italy
- Original language: Italian
- No. of seasons: 24 + Summer
- No. of episodes: 5673

Production
- Executive producer: Debora Profazi
- Production locations: Summer 2002, 2006–2012: studio 5, Studi Dear (Rome); Autumn 2002–2006: TV3, Centro di produzione Rai di Milano (Milan); 2012–2015: studio 6, Studi Dear (Rome); 2015–2017: studio 18, Cinecittà (Rome); 2017–present: studio 4, Studi televisivi Fabrizio Frizzi (ex Dear) (Rome)
- Running time: 70 minutes approx including commercials
- Production companies: Magnolia, RAI

Original release
- Network: Rai 1
- Release: 29 July 2002 – present

L'eredità (The inheritance) is an Italian Rai 1 game show currently hosted by Marco Liorni. It premiered on 29 July 2002. From 29 July 2002 to 10 June 2006, it was hosted by Italian presenter Amadeus. He was succeeded by Carlo Conti, who hosted the show until 14 April 2014, when he was replaced by Fabrizio Frizzi. Frizzi hosted until 23 October 2017, when he became ill during the taping of the next show and was taken to the hospital. Carlo Conti substituted for Frizzi from 30 October 2017 to 15 December 2017, and he hosted the special episode in tandem with Fabrizio Frizzi when the latter returned to host the quiz. On 16 December 2017, Fabrizio Frizzi resumed hosting the show by himself until 25 March 2018. The next day, Frizzi died of a brain haemorrhage. Following a hiatus due to Frizzi's death, the game returned from 3 April 2018 until the end of the season with the host Carlo Conti. Flavio Insinna presented the show from 24 September 2018 until 18 June 2023.

The show reached 1,000 episodes on 19 November 2010, and with more than 5,000 episodes, it is the longest-running game show on Italian television. A video game based on the series was developed by Milestone srl and released for the PlayStation 2 and Microsoft Windows in 2003.

In the summer of 2026, from 20 July to 5 September 2026, a special edition entitled L'eredità Summer was aired.

== On-air talent ==
The current on-air talent for L'eredità consists of:

- Marco Liorni, Presenter
- Ofelia Passaponti, Professoressa (Teacher)
- Marta Antonucci, Professoressa (Teacher)

== Gameplay ==
=== Main game ===
Each episode features seven contestants, one being a returning champion, who compete to win a jackpot over the course of seven rounds. Only one contestant is allowed to answer a question at a time; if the contestant answers a question correctly, control is passed to the next contestant in a clockwise fashion. Each round continues until two questions are answered incorrectly by one contestant, after which the contestant who gave a second incorrect answer must challenge another contestant to an elimination duel known as the "Scalata Doppia" ("Double Climb"). For the duration of the duel, each contestant has 45 seconds (60 seconds until 18 December 2022 and from the 2024–2025 season after the fourth round) to correctly identify as many words as possible from a standard list of definitions; the first letter of each word is automatically given (with one letter added to the word every two seconds until a correct response is given or until one letter remains), and the contestant in control can make as many guesses as possible (the round is played in a chess clock format). Correctly identifying a word freezes the contestant's timer and passes control to the other contestant. When a contestant has no time left on their clock, they are eliminated from the game and leave with no money; the eliminated contestant's money sum is transferred to the contestant who won the duel.

"Sbagliando s’impara" (You learn from your mistakes, round 1)

This game exists from 2026–2027 edition in place of "C’è o non c’è?" (Is it there or isn’t it?). In this round, the contestant must correct an erroneous sentence related to a topic provided by the host by identifying the correct phrasing.

Upon committing a second error, the contestant faces the risk of elimination and must single out an opponent to challenge in the Double Climb.

"1, 2, 3... quella!" (1, 2, 3... that one!, round 2)

This game has been offered since 2025, in place of "Chi, Come, Cosa" (Who, How, What). In this round, the six contestants must guess an answer to which the host provides clues, a topic, and three keywords. If the contestant guesses correctly, they pass the game to their opponent. Otherwise, if they guess incorrectly twice in a row, they risk elimination and must go to the Double Climb by pointing their finger at one of the contestants still in the game.

"Le Date" (The Dates, round 3)

In this round, the host shows four years to the five contestants (from 1920 onwards), and they have to match an event to the correct year. The first contestant to give two incorrect answers is at risk of elimination.

"La Scossa" (The Shock, round 4)

This game was introduced from the first to the fourteenth edition and returned in the twenty-third edition on 24 March 2025.

The four remaining contestants are presented with a topic that is the subject of a question with nine answer options, and the contestants must not give the correct answer to avoid getting an electric shock.

Whoever gives the correct answer is at risk of elimination and with one of the opponents challenges each other to the Double Climb where they challenge each other to 60 seconds to go to the next game.

"Il Triello" (round 5)

In this round, the three contestants have to answer seven questions in seven categories. Every question has a value between €10,000 and €30,000. The player has ten seconds to answer a question with four options. If he/she misses or runs out of time, the game passes to another contestant who, if he/she answers correctly, adds the amount of that question to his/her total. At the end of the game, the two contestants with the highest totals advance to the sixth round. In the event of a tie for the last place at the end of this round, the two tied contestants have to face off against each other for the third spot in that round (with the time limit reduced to 30 seconds); a tie between all three competitors for first place must be broken by having two contestants face off against each other at a time, with the loser of the first duel facing off against the contestant who gave the last correct answer in the round during the second duel.

From the 2019–2020 season onwards, a mystery option associated with an unknown category was added (indicated onscreen by a question mark) where the competitor who chooses this option, once the matter has been disclosed, can decide whether to assign a value of €20,000 (two options), €40,000 (three options), or €60,000 (all four options) to the question. Only the contestant who selected the mystery category can play the question; if they answer correctly, they add the value to their jackpot, whereas if they answer incorrectly, the question is discarded, with the value of the question being equally divided between the other two challengers, thus €10,000 each if the question had two answers, €20,000 each if it had three and €30,000 if all four answers were shown. Furthermore, the three competitors who qualify for the "Triello" acquire the right to return for the next episode, with the winner of the next round being immune from the first round of the next game. From the 2022–2023 edition, the two competitors with the highest prize pool qualify for the next game.

In the case of tie between two contestants, there will be a double climb which will last 30 seconds and the one who wins the tie-breaker will go to the next game.

From the 2024–2025 season, are added among the seven subjects, the "Domande Pigliatutto" (Take it all Questions), the contestant who gets this question, has the chance to take the inheritance of one of his challengers if he answers correctly, otherwise, the challenger takes half of his inheritance.

Furthermore, in this edition, one of the seven subjects is worth €50,000 while the question with the unexpected is eliminated.

From the 2025–2026 edition, the questions are six.

"I 100 secondi" (100 seconds, round 6)

In this round, introduced from the 2024 season, replacing the Jab, the two finalist contestants must answer a series of questions in order to access the final game. The contestant with the highest prize pool begins and must answer a barrage of direct response questions in 100 seconds. If the player does not know the answer or makes a mistake, he gives the playing hand to his opponent who, if he gives the correct answer, keeps the playing hand. However, if neither of them answers the question correctly, the answer is revealed by the host and the player keeps the game hand.

At the end of the round, the competitor who has kept the playing hand until the time runs out will go to the final game.

From the 2025–2026 edition, the contestant who has accumulated the highest prize total during the "Triello" round earns a "joker", that is a lifeline that allows them to pause the clock if they are unable to answer a question, enabling them to remain in control of the game.

=== "La Ghigliottina" (The Guillotine, round 7) ===
The final round, which was introduced in the 2005–2006 season, was the idea of Stefano Santucci, the creator of the show. The contestant is presented with five pairs of words (one pair at a time), of which only one in each pair is the correct word. The jackpot is retained for every correct response and is halved for every incorrect response. Once all five pairs are played, the contestant is given 60 seconds to study the five correct words and then must write a word that bears a thematic connection to the other five words. If the word that was written is identical to the word on the host's card, the contestant wins all of the prize money they have retained; if the word does not match the one on the host's card, the contestant leaves empty-handed and returns to the next episode.

== Game history ==
In the table sorted below, the order in which each game is played is denoted by a number, while "P" indicates a game that was played as a preliminary round prior to the start of the main game.

	Season																									
Game	1	2	3	4	5	6	7	8	9	10	11	12	13	14	15	16	17	18	19	20	21	22	23	24	Summer	25
La scalata (The Climb)	—N/a	—N/a	—N/a	—N/a	—N/a	—N/a	—N/a	—N/a	—N/a	P	P	—N/a	—N/a	—N/a	—N/a	—N/a	—N/a	—N/a	—N/a	—N/a	—N/a	—N/a	—N/a	—N/a	—N/a	—N/a
Gli abbinamenti (The Pairings)	—N/a	—N/a	—N/a	—N/a	—N/a	—N/a	—N/a	—N/a	—N/a	—N/a	—N/a	P	P	P	—N/a	—N/a	1	1	1	1	1	—N/a	—N/a	—N/a	—N/a	—N/a
Continua tu (You continue)	—N/a	—N/a	—N/a	—N/a	—N/a	—N/a	—N/a	—N/a	—N/a	—N/a	—N/a	—N/a	—N/a	—N/a	—N/a	—N/a	—N/a	—N/a	—N/a	—N/a	1	—N/a	1	—N/a	—N/a	—N/a
C'è o non c'è? (Is it there or isn't it?)	—N/a	—N/a	—N/a	—N/a	—N/a	—N/a	—N/a	—N/a	—N/a	—N/a	—N/a	—N/a	—N/a	—N/a	—N/a	—N/a	—N/a	—N/a	—N/a	—N/a	—N/a	—N/a	1	1	—N/a	—N/a
Il Cubo (The Cube)	—N/a	—N/a	—N/a	—N/a	—N/a	—N/a	—N/a	—N/a	—N/a	—N/a	—N/a	—N/a	—N/a	P	—N/a	—N/a	—N/a	—N/a	—N/a	—N/a	—N/a	—N/a	—N/a	—N/a	—N/a	—N/a
Il Tris (The Three)	—N/a	—N/a	—N/a	—N/a	—N/a	—N/a	—N/a	—N/a	—N/a	—N/a	—N/a	—N/a	—N/a	—N/a	—N/a	—N/a	—N/a	—N/a	—N/a	—N/a	—N/a	1	—N/a	—N/a	—N/a	—N/a
Fuori il primo (Out the First)	1	1	1	—N/a	—N/a	—N/a	—N/a	—N/a	—N/a	—N/a	—N/a	—N/a	—N/a	—N/a	—N/a	—N/a	—N/a	—N/a	—N/a	—N/a	—N/a	—N/a	—N/a	—N/a	—N/a	—N/a
Usa la testa (Use the Head)	—N/a	—N/a	—N/a	1	—N/a	—N/a	—N/a	—N/a	—N/a	—N/a	—N/a	—N/a	—N/a	—N/a	—N/a	—N/a	—N/a	—N/a	—N/a	—N/a	—N/a	—N/a	—N/a	—N/a	—N/a	—N/a
Prendere o lasciare (Take or Leave)	—N/a	—N/a	2	—N/a	—N/a	—N/a	—N/a	—N/a	—N/a	—N/a	—N/a	—N/a	—N/a	—N/a	—N/a	—N/a	—N/a	—N/a	—N/a	—N/a	—N/a	—N/a	—N/a	—N/a	—N/a	—N/a
Vero o falso (True or False)	2	2	3	2	1	1	1	1	1	1	1	1	1	1	—N/a	—N/a	—N/a	—N/a	—N/a	—N/a	—N/a	—N/a	—N/a	—N/a	—N/a	—N/a
La parola mancante (The Missing Word)	—N/a	—N/a	—N/a	—N/a	1	—N/a	—N/a	—N/a	—N/a	—N/a	—N/a	—N/a	—N/a	—N/a	—N/a	—N/a	—N/a	—N/a	—N/a	—N/a	—N/a	—N/a	—N/a	—N/a	—N/a	—N/a
Il domino musicale (The Musical Domino)	—N/a	—N/a	—N/a	—N/a	—N/a	—N/a	—N/a	—N/a	—N/a	—N/a	—N/a	—N/a	—N/a	—N/a	1	1	—N/a	—N/a	—N/a	—N/a	—N/a	—N/a	—N/a	—N/a	—N/a	—N/a
Chi l'ha detto (Who Said That?)	—N/a	—N/a	—N/a	—N/a	2	—N/a	—N/a	—N/a	—N/a	—N/a	—N/a	—N/a	—N/a	—N/a	—N/a	—N/a	—N/a	—N/a	—N/a	—N/a	—N/a	—N/a	—N/a	—N/a	—N/a	—N/a
Il domino (The Domino)	—N/a	—N/a	—N/a	—N/a	—N/a	2	2	2	—N/a	—N/a	—N/a	—N/a	—N/a	—N/a	—N/a	—N/a	—N/a	—N/a	—N/a	—N/a	—N/a	—N/a	—N/a	—N/a	—N/a	—N/a
L'una o l'altra (One or the Other)	—N/a	—N/a	—N/a	—N/a	—N/a	—N/a	—N/a	—N/a	—N/a	—N/a	—N/a	—N/a	—N/a	—N/a	2	2	2	2	2	—N/a	—N/a	—N/a	—N/a	—N/a	—N/a	—N/a
Cambia-Aggiungi-Leva (Change-Add-Remove)	—N/a	—N/a	—N/a	—N/a	—N/a	—N/a	—N/a	—N/a	—N/a	—N/a	—N/a	—N/a	—N/a	—N/a	—N/a	—N/a	—N/a	—N/a	—N/a	2	—N/a	—N/a	—N/a	—N/a	—N/a	—N/a
Chi, Come, Cosa (Who, How, What)	—N/a	—N/a	—N/a	—N/a	—N/a	—N/a	—N/a	—N/a	—N/a	—N/a	—N/a	—N/a	—N/a	—N/a	—N/a	—N/a	—N/a	—N/a	—N/a	—N/a	2	2	2	—N/a	—N/a	—N/a
Sbagliando s’impara (You learn from your mistakes)	—N/a	—N/a	—N/a	—N/a	—N/a	—N/a	—N/a	—N/a	—N/a	—N/a	—N/a	—N/a	—N/a	—N/a	—N/a	—N/a	—N/a	—N/a	—N/a	—N/a	—N/a	—N/a	—N/a	—N/a	—N/a	1
1, 2, 3... quella! (1, 2, 3... that one!)	—N/a	—N/a	—N/a	—N/a	—N/a	—N/a	—N/a	—N/a	—N/a	—N/a	—N/a	—N/a	—N/a	—N/a	—N/a	—N/a	—N/a	—N/a	—N/a	—N/a	—N/a	—N/a	—N/a	2	—N/a	2
I Fantastici Quattro/Le Date (The Fantastic Four/The Dates)	—N/a	—N/a	—N/a	—N/a	—N/a	—N/a	2	2	2	2	2	2	2	2	3	3	3	3	3	3	3	3	3	3	2	3
Prendilo per la coda (Take it by the Tail)	3	—N/a	—N/a	—N/a	—N/a	—N/a	—N/a	—N/a	—N/a	—N/a	—N/a	—N/a	—N/a	—N/a	—N/a	—N/a	—N/a	—N/a	—N/a	—N/a	—N/a	—N/a	—N/a	—N/a	—N/a	—N/a
La patata bollente (Hot Potato)	—N/a	3	4	—N/a	—N/a	—N/a	—N/a	—N/a	—N/a	—N/a	—N/a	—N/a	—N/a	—N/a	—N/a	—N/a	—N/a	—N/a	—N/a	—N/a	—N/a	—N/a	—N/a	—N/a	—N/a	—N/a
Lei o l'altra (She or the Other)	4	4	—N/a	3	—N/a	—N/a	—N/a	—N/a	—N/a	—N/a	—N/a	—N/a	—N/a	—N/a	—N/a	—N/a	—N/a	—N/a	—N/a	—N/a	—N/a	—N/a	—N/a	—N/a	—N/a	—N/a
La scossa (The Shock)	5	5	5	4	3	3	3	3	3	3	3	3	3	3	—N/a	—N/a	—N/a	—N/a	—N/a	—N/a	—N/a	—N/a	4	4	1	4
L'indiziato (The Suspect)	—N/a	—N/a	—N/a	—N/a	4	—N/a	—N/a	—N/a	—N/a	—N/a	—N/a	—N/a	—N/a	—N/a	—N/a	—N/a	—N/a	—N/a	—N/a	—N/a	—N/a	—N/a	—N/a	—N/a	—N/a	—N/a
L'Identikit (The Identikit)	—N/a	—N/a	—N/a	—N/a	—N/a	4	—N/a	—N/a	—N/a	—N/a	—N/a	—N/a	—N/a	—N/a	—N/a	—N/a	—N/a	—N/a	—N/a	—N/a	—N/a	—N/a	—N/a	—N/a	—N/a	—N/a
Cos'è? (What's This?)	—N/a	—N/a	—N/a	—N/a	—N/a	—N/a	4	4	4	—N/a	—N/a	—N/a	—N/a	—N/a	—N/a	—N/a	—N/a	—N/a	—N/a	—N/a	—N/a	—N/a	—N/a	—N/a	—N/a	—N/a
Hit Parade	—N/a	—N/a	—N/a	—N/a	—N/a	—N/a	—N/a	—N/a	—N/a	4	—N/a	—N/a	—N/a	—N/a	—N/a	—N/a	—N/a	—N/a	—N/a	—N/a	—N/a	—N/a	—N/a	—N/a	—N/a	—N/a
Chi o cosa? (Who or What?)	—N/a	—N/a	—N/a	—N/a	—N/a	—N/a	—N/a	—N/a	—N/a	4	4	—N/a	—N/a	—N/a	—N/a	—N/a	—N/a	—N/a	—N/a	—N/a	—N/a	—N/a	—N/a	—N/a	—N/a	—N/a
Il bivio (The Crossroads)	—N/a	—N/a	—N/a	—N/a	—N/a	—N/a	—N/a	—N/a	—N/a	—N/a	—N/a	4	4	—N/a	—N/a	—N/a	—N/a	—N/a	—N/a	—N/a	—N/a	—N/a	—N/a	—N/a	—N/a	—N/a
Il Duello (The Duel)	—N/a	—N/a	—N/a	5	5	5	5	5	5	5	5	5	5	—N/a	—N/a	—N/a	—N/a	—N/a	—N/a	—N/a	—N/a	—N/a	—N/a	—N/a	—N/a	—N/a
Di cosa stiamo parlando? (What Are We Talking About?)	—N/a	—N/a	—N/a	—N/a	—N/a	—N/a	—N/a	—N/a	—N/a	—N/a	—N/a	—N/a	—N/a	—N/a	4	4	4	—N/a	—N/a	—N/a	—N/a	—N/a	—N/a	—N/a	—N/a	—N/a
I Paroloni (The Big Words)	—N/a	—N/a	—N/a	—N/a	—N/a	—N/a	—N/a	—N/a	—N/a	—N/a	—N/a	—N/a	—N/a	—N/a	—N/a	—N/a	—N/a	4	4	4	4	4	4	—N/a	—N/a	—N/a
Il Triello	—N/a	—N/a	—N/a	—N/a	—N/a	—N/a	—N/a	—N/a	—N/a	—N/a	—N/a	—N/a	—N/a	4	5	5	5	5	5	5	5	5	5	5	—N/a	5
L'ultima sfida (The Final Task)	6	6	6	—N/a	—N/a	—N/a	—N/a	—N/a	—N/a	—N/a	—N/a	—N/a	—N/a	—N/a	—N/a	—N/a	—N/a	—N/a	—N/a	—N/a	—N/a	—N/a	—N/a	—N/a	—N/a	—N/a
I calci di rigore (The Penalties)	—N/a	—N/a	—N/a	—N/a	—N/a	—N/a	—N/a	—N/a	—N/a	—N/a	—N/a	—N/a	—N/a	—N/a	6	6	6	6	—N/a	—N/a	—N/a	—N/a	—N/a	—N/a	—N/a	—N/a
I 2 Passi (The 2 Steps)	—N/a	—N/a	—N/a	—N/a	—N/a	—N/a	—N/a	—N/a	—N/a	—N/a	—N/a	—N/a	—N/a	—N/a	—N/a	—N/a	—N/a	—N/a	6	6	—N/a	—N/a	—N/a	—N/a	—N/a	—N/a
La Stoccata (The Jab)	—N/a	—N/a	—N/a	—N/a	—N/a	—N/a	—N/a	—N/a	—N/a	—N/a	—N/a	—N/a	—N/a	—N/a	—N/a	—N/a	—N/a	—N/a	—N/a	—N/a	6	—N/a	—N/a	—N/a	—N/a	—N/a
Le Sei Porte (The Six Doors)	—N/a	—N/a	—N/a	—N/a	—N/a	—N/a	—N/a	—N/a	—N/a	—N/a	—N/a	—N/a	—N/a	—N/a	—N/a	—N/a	—N/a	—N/a	—N/a	—N/a	—N/a	—N/a	—N/a	—N/a	3	—N/a
I 100 secondi (100 Seconds)	—N/a	—N/a	—N/a	—N/a	—N/a	—N/a	—N/a	—N/a	—N/a	—N/a	—N/a	—N/a	—N/a	—N/a	—N/a	—N/a	—N/a	—N/a	—N/a	—N/a	—N/a	6	6	6	—N/a	6
La Ghigliottina (The Guillotine)	—N/a	—N/a	—N/a	6	6	6	6	6	6	6	6	6	6	5	7	7	7	7	7	7	7	7	7	7	4	7
L'Eredità (The Inheritance)	7	7	7	—N/a	—N/a	—N/a	—N/a	—N/a	—N/a	—N/a	—N/a	—N/a	—N/a	—N/a	—N/a	—N/a	—N/a	—N/a	—N/a	—N/a	—N/a	—N/a	—N/a	—N/a	—N/a	—N/a

== International versions ==
This game is an Italian adaptation of the Argentinian game show El legado created by Marcelo Ferrero aired on Telefe and sold all over the world, particularly in Latin American countries.

All the international versions except the French, the Hungarian, the first Turkish version, the first two Spanish versions and the original are inspired by the Italian version.

- Currently airing
- No longer airing
- Non-broadcast pilot

Country	Title	Network	Host(s)	Date aired
Argentina (original version)	El legado El legado Famosos; El legado Kids	Telefe	Jorge Guinzburg	15 January 2002 – 2003
Argentina (original version)	El legado El legado Famosos; El legado Kids	El Trece	Matías Martin and Luca Martin	8 January 2024 – 3 May 2024
Belgium (Wallonia)	Les Associés	La Une	Sara de Paduwa	24 September 2018 – 27 March 2022
Brazil	O Céu É o Limite	RedeTV!	Marcelo de Carvalho	11 March 2017 – 8 September 2018
France	Crésus	TF1	Vincent Lagaf'	4 July 2005 – 1 September 2006
France	Les 12 Coups de Midi	TF1	Jean-Luc Reichmann	28 June 2010 – present
Hungary	Az örökös	M1	Gábor Gundel Takács	15 October 2007 – 30 May 2008
Italy	L'eredità	Rai 1	Amadeus (2002–2006); Carlo Conti (2006–2016; 2017–2018); Fabrizio Frizzi (2014–2018); Flavio Insinna (1 April 2015 episode; 2018–2023); Marco Liorni (2024–present)	29 July 2002 – present
Mexico	El legado	Azteca Trece	Sergio Sepúlveda	25 April 2015 – 28 November 2015
Poland	Gilotyna	TVP 2	Roman Czejarek	5 October 2009 – 2 June 2011
Portugal	A Herança; A Herança de Verão	RTP1	José Carlos Malato; Tânia Ribas de Oliveira	31 January 2006 – 2007
Spain	El legado	Telecinco	Roberto Kamphoff	8 July 2002 – 27 July 2002
Spain	La quinta esfera	Telecinco	Jorge Fernández	26 May 2003 – 3 November 2003
Spain	La guillotina	Telecinco	Jesús Vázquez	13 March 2010 – 20 June 2010
Spain	El legado	La 1	Ramón García	19 January 2015 – 15 February 2015
Turkey	Miras	TRT 1	Metin Uca (January–April 2005); Gani Müjde (May–June 2005); İbrahim Sadri (September–November 2005)	January 2005 – November 2005
Turkey	Vay Arkadaş	Star TV	Oktay Kaynarca and Ferzan Hekimoğlu	2 July 2014 – 21 March 2015
United States	The Guillotine	?	?	2009 (pilot rejected)

The format was being negotiated by production companies also in Chile, Greece and Romania.
