= Carlo Conti =

Italian TV presenter (born 1961)

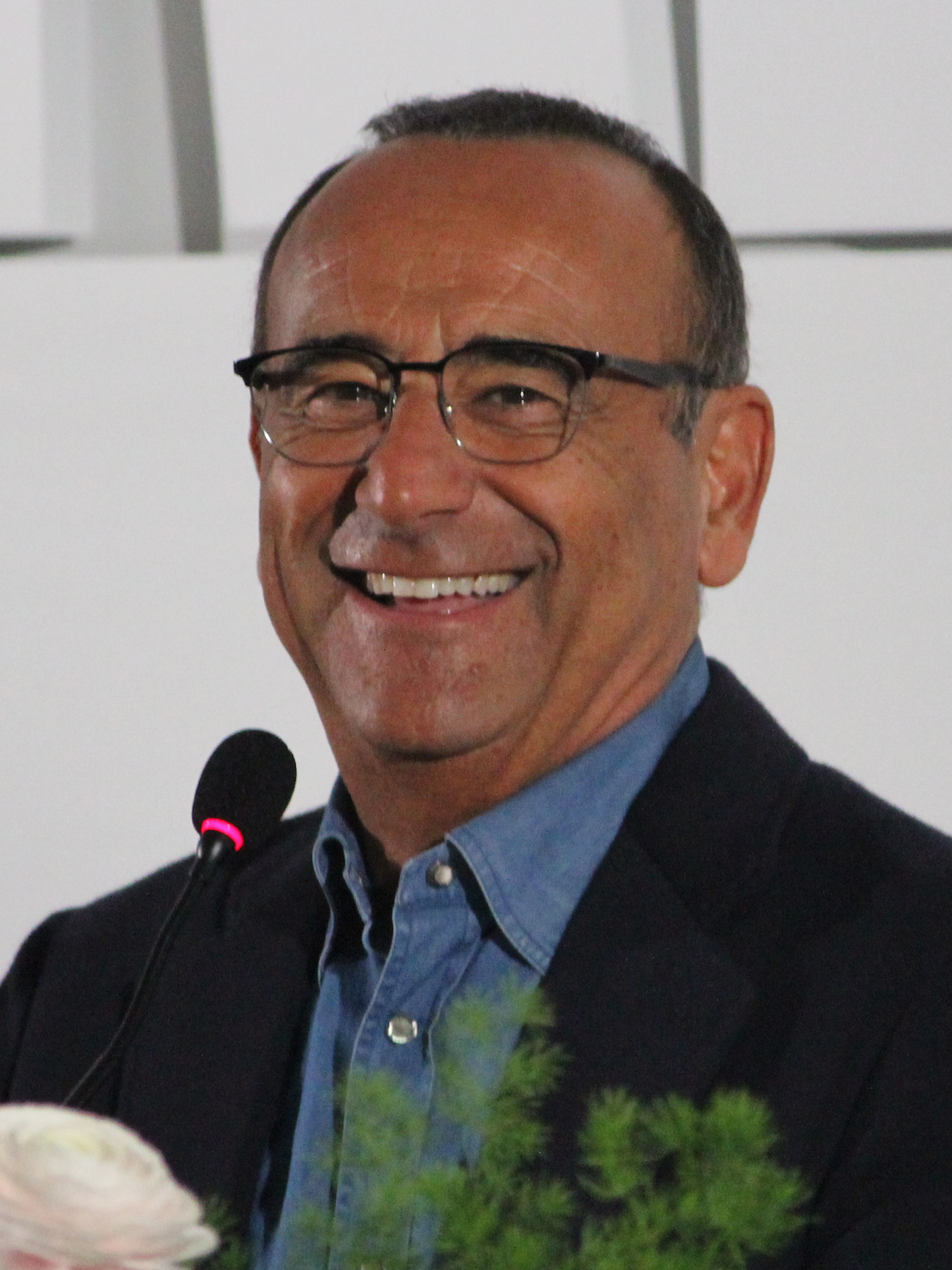
- Conti at the Sanremo Music Festival 2026
- Born: Carlo Natale Marino Conti; 13 March 1961 (age 65); Florence, Italy
- Occupation: Television presenter
- Height: 1.75 m (5 ft 9 in)
- Spouse: Francesca Vaccaro (m. 2012)
- Children: 1

Carlo Natale Marino Conti, simply known as Carlo Conti (born 13 March 1961) is an Italian television presenter.

== Early life and career ==
Born in Florence, Conti graduated in accountancy, then he was a bank teller from 1981 to 1986. After some experiences in radio as a presenter and a DJ, he debuted as a television presenter in 1985, hosting the Rai 1 musical show Discoring.

He later hosted several successful TV programmes, including Aria fresca, L'eredità, I migliori anni, Tale e quale show, Domenica in and five editions of Miss Italia.

In 2014, Conti was named the host and artistic director of the Sanremo Music Festival 2015. He continued in these roles for the 2016 and 2017 editions of the festival, and reprised them for 2025 and 2026.

Conti has been a recurrent host of the TIM Music Awards. In June 2024, he hosted the TIM Summer Hits event alongside Andrea Delogu. In 2025, Conti hosted the Rai 1 talent show competition series Ne vedremo delle belle.

== Personal life ==
Conti is a Roman Catholic. On 16 June 2012, he married at the Pieve di Sant'Andrea in Cercina costume designer Francesca Vaccaro, with whom he had had a past relationship. On 8 February 2014, their son Matteo was born.

On 15 June 2011, the asteroid 78535 Carloconti was named after him.
