= All Together Now (Italian TV series) =

- Genre: Game show; Talent show
- Directed by: Roberto Cenci
- Presented by: Michelle Hunziker
- Country of origin: Italy
- Original language: Italian
- No. of seasons: 4
- No. of episodes: 25

Production
- Running time: 150 minutes
- Production company: EndemolShine Italy

Original release
- Network: Canale 5
- Release: 16 May 2019 – 19 December 2021

Related
- All Together Now (franchise)

All Together Now was an Italian reality television music competition hosted by Michelle Hunziker, based on the reality television singing competition format of the same name.

== Summary ==
Season	Venue	Premiere	Finale	Winner	Viewers	Share	Presenter(s)	Participant artists	Prize
1	Voxson (Rome)	16 May 2019	20 June 2019	Gregorio Rega	2,647,000	15.87%	Michelle Hunziker (presenter) with J-Ax (captain)	49	€50,000
2	Cinecittà (Rome)	4 December 2019	2 January 2020	Sonia Mosca	2,571,000	14.75%	Michelle Hunziker (presenter) with J-Ax (captain)	29	€50,000
3	Cinecittà (Rome)	4 November 2020	12 December 2020	Cahayadi "Eki" Kam	3,284,000	15.86%	Michelle Hunziker (presenter) with four celebrities as judges	12	€50,000
4	Cinecittà (Rome)	31 October 2021	19 December 2021	Giacomo Voli	2,329,000	12.63%	Michelle Hunziker (presenter) with four celebrities as judges	14	€50,000

== Season 1 (2019) ==
=== Episode 1 ===
First heat

Order	Artist	Song	Score	Result
1	Graziana Tafuni	Think (Aretha Franklin)	50	Eliminated
2	Amedeo Raciti	Nessun dolore (Lucio Battisti)	70	Advanced
3	Rosy Messina	Dimmi come... (Alexia)	99	Semifinalist
4	Davide Pezzella	L'ombelico del mondo (Jovanotti)	28	Eliminated
5	Veronica Liberati (Note: Participant in the second edition of Ti lascio una canzone.)	Don't Let the Sun Go Down on Me (Elton John)	93	Advanced
6	Marco Galeotti	La notte vola (Lorella Cuccarini)	41	Eliminated
7	Tanya Davolio	Amoureux solitaires (Lio)	18	Eliminated

Sing-off
Order	Artist	Song	Score	Result
1	Amedeo Raciti	Una donna per amico (Lucio Battisti)	30	To the last sing-off
2	Veronica Liberati	Io fra tanti (Giorgia)	83	Semifinalist

Second heat

Order	Artist	Song	Score	Result
1	Vanessa Catarinelli	I wanna dance with somebody (Whitney Houston)	31	Eliminated
2	Antonio Gerardi	I feel good (James Brown)	80	Advanced
3	Augusta Procesi	La vita (Elio Gandolfi)	99	Semifinalist
4	Frenetiche	It's Raining Men (The Weather Girls)	60	Eliminated
5	Daria Biancardi (Note: Semifinalist of the second edition of The Voice of Italy.)	Gloria (Umberto Tozzi)	94	Advanced
6	Francesco Sanchini	Another One Bites the Dust (Queen)	18	Eliminated

Sing-off
Order	Artist	Song	Score	Result
1	Antonio Gerardi	It's a Man's Man's Man's World (James Brown)	70	To the last sing-off
2	Daria Biancardi	Last Dance (Donna Summer)	98	Semifinalist

Last sing-off

The last sing-off
Order	Artist	Song	Score	Result
1	Amedeo Raciti	Nessun dolore (Lucio Battisti)	45	Eliminated
2	Antonio Gerardi	I feel good (James Brown)	62	Semifinalist

=== Episode 2 ===
First heat

Order	Artist	Song	Score	Result
1	Bruno Gatto	Via (Claudio Baglioni)	61	Eliminated
2	Ladies Big	Survivor (Destiny's Child)	51	Eliminated
3	Mirella Piazza	Domenica lunatica (Vasco Rossi)	74	Eliminated
4	Michele Menta	You make me feel (Sylvester)	90	Advanced
5	Gregorio Rega (Note: Participant in the third edition of The Voice of Italy)	Dedicato a te (Matia Bazar)	91	Semifinalist
6	Samantha Discolpa (Note: Participant in the second edition of Amici di Maria De Filippi.)	One night only (Deborah Burrell, Loretta Devine, Jennifer Holliday, Sheryl Lee Ralph)	89	Advanced

Sing-off
Order	Artist	Song	Score	Result
1	Samantha Discolpa	Mamma Knows Best (Jessie J)	72	Semifinalist
2	Michele Menta	Forget you (CeeLo Green)	59	To the last sing-off

Second heat;

Order	Artist	Song	Score	Result
1	Ubaldo Zambelli	Relax (Frankie Goes to Hollywood)	17	Eliminated
2	Giulia Casagrande	Città vuota (Mina)	78	Eliminated
3	Beppe di Figlia	Celebration (Kool & the Gang)	41	Eliminated
4	Luca Di Stefano	Just the way you are (Billy Joel)	95	Semifinalist
5	Federica Bensi (Note: Participant in the second edition of The Voice of Italy.)	Don't You Worry 'bout a Thing (Stevie Wonder)	84	Advanced
6	Daniela	E la luna bussò (Loredana Bertè)	50	Eliminated
7	Matteo Bigazzi	Great Balls of Fire (Jerry Lee Lewis)	88	Advanced

Sing-off
Order	Artist	Song	Score	Result
1	Federica Bensi	Something's Got a Hold on Me (Etta James)	62	To the last sing-off
2	Matteo Bigazzi	Blue Suede Shoes (Carl Perkins)	69	Semifinalist

Last sing-off

The last sing-off
Order	Artist	Song	Score	Result
1	Michele Menta	You make me feel (Sylvester)	67	Eliminated
2	Federica Bensi	Don't You Worry 'bout a Thing (Stevie Wonder)	76	Semifinalist

=== Episode 3 ===
First heat

Order	Artist	Song	Score	Result
1	Mario Campanile	Se telefonando (Mina)	49	Eliminated
2	Letizia Chimienti	Strong enough (Cher)	71	Advanced
3	Mauro Antonelli	Baila (Zucchero)	68	Eliminated
4	Tania Frison	America (Gianna Nannini)	84	Advanced
5	Manuel Colecchia	True colors (Cyndi Lauper)	99	Semifinalist
6	Zendrin	Can't Take My Eyes Off You (Frankie Valli)	40	Eliminated

Sing-off
Order	Artist	Song	Score	Result
1	Letizia Chimienti	Flashdance... What a Feeling (Irene Cara)	63	To the last sing-off
2	Tania Frison	Don't Leave Me This Way (Harold Melvin & the Blue Notes)	89	Semifinalist

Second heat

Order	Artist	Song	Score	Result
1	Dennis Fantina	All night long (Lionel Richie)	91	Advanced
2	Desirié Bert (Note: Keeniatta Baird, semifinalist of the third edition of The Voice of Italy.)	Proud Mary (Creedence Clearwater Revival)	99	Semifinalist
3	Concilia Morone	Amore e capoeira (Takagi & Ketra feat. Giusy Ferreri, Sean Kingston)	37	Eliminated
4	Francesca Pace	L'incantevole Creamy (Cristina D'Avena)	76	Advanced
5	Marco Vicini	The Lady Is a Tramp (Mitzi Green)	58	Eliminated

Sing-off
Order	Artist	Song	Score	Result
1	Francesca Pace	Kiss me Licia (Cristina D'Avena)	44	To the last sing-off
2	Dennis Fantina	Eppur mi son scordato di te (Formula 3)	84	Semifinalist

Last sing-off

The last sing-off
Order	Artist	Song	Score	Result
1	Letizia Chimienti	Strong enough (Cher)	75	Semifinalist
2	Francesca Pace	L'incantevole Creamy (Cristina D'Avena)	67	Eliminated

=== Episode 4 ===
First heat

Order	Artist	Song	Score	Result
1	Erica Loi	Simply the Best (Bonnie Tyler)	75	Advanced
2	Antonio Toni	Vieni da me (Le Vibrazioni)	70	Advanced
3	Carlo Paradisone	Stand by me (Ben E. King)	95	Semifinalist
4	Martina Maggi (Note: Participant in the Cantagiro 2016.)	If I Ain't Got You (Alicia Keys)	100	Finalist
5	Francesco Misitano	La notte (Modà)	17	Eliminated
6	Sabrina Savarese	Diamonds Are a Girl's Best Friend (Carol Channing)	50	Eliminated

Sing-off
Order	Artist	Song	Score	Result
1	Antonio Toni	All of me (John Legend)	98	Semifinalist
2	Erica Loi	Nutbush City Limits (Tina Turner)	79	To the last sing-off

Second heat

Order	Artist	Song	Score	Result
1	Mauro Pandolfo	Oggi sono io (Alex Britti)	82	Advanced
2	Alessandra Procacci (Note: Participant in the eleventh edition of Amici di Maria De Filippi.)	I Put a Spell on You (Screamin' Jay Hawkins)	100	Finalist
3	Francesca Giaccari (Note: Participant in the eleventh edition of Grande Fratello.)	Il paradiso (La Ragazza 77)	57	Eliminated
4	Thomas Grazioso (Note: Participant in the fourth edition of Amici di Maria De Filippi.)	We Are the Champions (Queen)	40	Eliminated
5	Anna Faragò	Never Can Say Goodbye (The Jackson 5)	78	Advanced
6	Samuele Di Nicolò	Against all odds (Phil Collins)	86	Semifinalist

Sing-off
Order	Artist	Song	Score	Result
1	Anna Faragò	We Are Family (Sister Sledge)	80	Semifinalist
2	Mauro Pandolfo	This Love (Maroon 5)	35	To the last sing-off

Last sing-off

The last sing-off
Order	Artist	Song	Score	Result
1	Erica Loi	Simply the Best (Bonnie Tyler)	97	Semifinalist
2	Mauro Pandolfo	Oggi sono io (Alex Britti)	59	Eliminated

=== Semifinal ===
	Order	Artist	Song	Score	Result
First sing-off
First sing-off	1	Matteo Bigazzi	Crazy Little Thing Called Love (Queen)	56	Eliminated
First sing-off	2	Veronica Liberati	Caruso (Lucio Dalla)	99	Finalist
Second sing-off
Second sing-off	3	Tania Frison	Sei nell'anima (Gianna Nannini)	16	Eliminated
Second sing-off	4	Rosy Messina	No more tears (Barbra Streisand and Donna Summer)	91	Finalist
Third sing-off
Third sing-off	5	Gregorio Rega	Ancora (Eduardo De Crescenzo)	97	Finalist
Third sing-off	6	Samuele Di Nicolò	The final countdown (Europe)	62	Eliminated
Fourth sing-off
Fourth sing-off	7	Desirié Bert	Ain't No Mountain High Enough (Marvin Gaye and Tammi Terrell)	81	Eliminated
Fourth sing-off	8	Carlo Paradisone	Hello (Lionel Richie)	92	Finalist
Fifth sing-off
Fifth sing-off	9	Antonio Gerardi	Il mondo (Jimmy Fontana)	39	Eliminated
Fifth sing-off	10	Samantha Discolpa	Shallow (Bradley Cooper and Lady Gaga)	60	Finalist
Sixth sing-off
Sixth sing-off	11	Daria Biancardi	MacArthur Park (Richard Harris)	99	Finalist
Sixth sing-off	12	Erica Loi	Rolling in the Deep (Adele)	39	Eliminated
Seventh sing-off
Seventh sing-off	13	Federica Bensi	Come saprei (Giorgia)	87	Finalist
Seventh sing-off	14	Antonio Toni	Perfect (Ed Sheeran)	54	Eliminated
Eighth sing-off
Eighth sing-off	15	Anna Faragò	Ti sento (Matia Bazar)	81	Eliminated
Eighth sing-off	16	Manuel Colecchia	Stay (Rihanna feat. Mikky Ekko)	99	Finalist
Ninth sing-off
Ninth sing-off	17	Luca Di Stefano	You're the First, the Last, My Everything (Barry White)	73	Finalist
Ninth sing-off	18	Augusta Procesi	Vorrei che fosse amore (Mina)	72	Eliminated
Tenth sing-off
Tenth sing-off	19	Letizia Chimienti	I'm Outta Love (Anastacia)	50	Eliminated
Tenth sing-off	20	Dennis Fantina	I Don't Want to Miss a Thing (Aerosmith)	94	Finalist

=== Final ===
First heat

	Order	Artist	Song	Score	Result
First sing-off
First sing-off	1	Carlo Paradisone	Se bruciasse la città (Massimo Ranieri)	82	Advanced
First sing-off	2	Daria Biancardi	Think (Aretha Franklin)	75	Eliminated
Second sing-off
Second sing-off	3	Dennis Fantina	Oggi sono io (Alex Britti)	67	Eliminated
Second sing-off	4	Luca Di Stefano	Bella senz'anima (Riccardo Cocciante)	87	Advanced
Terza sing-off
Terza sing-off	5	Rosy Messina	America (Gianna Nannini)	76	Advanced
Terza sing-off	6	Samantha Discolpa	La vita (Elio Gandolfi)	54	Eliminated
Fourth sing-off
Fourth sing-off	7	Manuel Colecchia	...E dimmi che non vuoi morire (Patty Pravo)	48	Eliminated
Fourth sing-off	8	Veronica Liberati	E non finisce mica il cielo (Mia Martini)	95	Advanced
Fifth sing-off
Fifth sing-off	9	Federica Bensi	I Have Nothing (Whitney Houston)	44	Eliminated
Fifth sing-off	10	Martina Maggi	Shallow (Bradley Cooper and Lady Gaga)	73	Advanced
Sixth sing-off
Sixth sing-off	11	Alessandra Procacci	Listen (Beyoncé)	71	Eliminated
Sixth sing-off	12	Gregorio Rega	Yes I Know My Way (Pino Daniele)	99	Advanced

Second heat

	Order	Artist	Song	Score	Result
First sing-off
First sing-off	1	Gregorio Rega	Somebody to love (Queen)	97	Advanced
First sing-off	2	Martina Maggi	Because the Night (Patti Smith Group)	60	Eliminated
Second sing-off
Second sing-off	3	Veronica Liberati	Don't Let the Sun Go Down on Me (Elton John)	98	Advanced
Second sing-off	4	Carlo Paradisone	Stand by me (Ben E. King)	78	Eliminated
Third sing-off
Third sing-off	5	Luca Di Stefano	Just the way you are (Billy Joel)	81	Advanced
Third sing-off	6	Rosy Messina	No more tears (Barbra Streisand and Donna Summer)	80	Eliminated

Duets

Duet
Order	Artist	Song	Score	Result
1	Gregorio Rega and Nek	Se telefonando (Mina)	99	Super finalist
2	Luca Di Stefano and Ron	Futura (Lucio Dalla)	-	Third place
3	Veronica Liberati and Al Bano	È la mia vita (Al Bano)	99	Super finalist

Super final

Super final
Order	Artist	Song	Score	Result
1	Gregorio Rega	Ancora (Eduardo De Crescenzo)	94	Winner
2	Veronica Liberati	Caruso (Lucio Dalla)	76	Runner-up

=== The 100 ===
Members of the 100 include:

Member	Occupation	Place of birth
Ginta	Singer	Switzerland
Sonia Addario	Singer	Italy
Lucya Allocca	Singer-songwriter	Italy
Mariateresa Amato (Note: Participant in the first edition of The Voice of Italy.)	Singer, actress and radio announcer	Italy
Guido Ambrosini alias Bido Bè	Singer	Italy
Sabrina Antonetti alias Chiatta (Palla and Chiatta)	Singer, actress and youtuber	Italy
Simona Bencini (Note: Participant in the Sanremo Music Festival 2006.)	Singer	Italy
Alexa Bennefield alias Alexa Selvaggia	Model	United States
Luca Buttiglieri	Actor and singer	Italy
Brigida Cacciatore (Note: Participant in the fifth edition of Amici di Maria De Filippi.)	Singer	Italy
Carmine Caiazzo	Composer and conductor	Italy
Susanna Caira	Singer	Italy
Sophia Calisti Guidotti	Singer	Italy
Irene Calvia	Singer and chorister	Italy
Alfonso Carbajal Perez alias Quetzalcoatl	Percussionist	Mexico
Benedetta Caretta (Note: Winner of the second edition of Io canto (programma televisivo).)	Singer	Italy
Lanfranco Carnacina (Note: Participant in the Sanremo Music Festival 1985.)	Singer	Italy
Claudia Casciaro	Singer	Italy
Timothy Cavicchini	Singer	Italy
Sara Jane Ceccarelli	Singer-songwriter	Italy
Maria Elisa Cirillo	Singer	Italy
Valeria Colombo	Actress	Italy
Valentina Dallari	Deejay and blogger	Italy
Leonardo Decarli	Singer and youtuber	Italy
Beatrice De Do	Musician	Italy
Fabio Demofonti alias Fabio2U	Singer	Italy
Mirko Dettori alias Mirkaccio	Variety artist and musician	Italy
Andrea Dianetti	Actor, singer and TV presenter	Italy
Claudio Di Cicco (Note: Participant in the fourth edition of The Voice of Italy.)	Singer	Italy
Francesco Di Roberto alias Cizco	Drummer and TV presenter	Italy
Sherrita Duran	Singer	United States
Samantha Fantauzzi (Note: Participant in the third edition of Amici di Maria De Filippi.)	Actress	Italy
Valeria Farinacci	Performer and singer	Italy
Lavinia Fiorani alias LaRomAntica	Singer	Italy
Pamela Gallico alias Alma (Alma and Rueka)	Singer	Italy
Marco Gangi	Singer, performer and entertainer	Italy
Valentina Gatti alias Valentina Shanti	Singer	Italy
Susanna Gecchele	Singer-songwriter and TV host	Italy
Giancarlo Genise	Vocal coach	Italy
Nathalie Giannitrapani	Singer-songwriter	Italy
Anna Guerra	Singer	Italy
Valentina Gullace	Singer, actress and dancer	Italy
Jonathan Heitch	Deejay	Dominican Republic
Vito Iacoviello	Singer	Italy
Valeria Iaquinto	Singer	Italy
Marco Iecher	Lawyer and singer-songwriter	Italy
Fabio Ingrosso	Singer and radio announcer	Italy
Elio Irace	Musician	Italy
Ronnie Jones	Singer and composer	United States
Veronica Kirchmajer	Singer	Italy
Mauro Leonardi (Karma B)	Singer	Italy
Letizia Liberati	Singer	Italy
Marco Ligabue	Singer-songwriter and guitarist	Italy
Antonella Lo Coco (Note: Finalist of the fifth edition of X Factor Italia and judge of the fourth edition of Io canto (programma televisivo).)	Singer	Italy
Alma Manera	Singer, actress and dancer	Italy
Morena Marangi	Singer and vocalist	Italy
Marc Mari	Opera singer	Italy
Leonardo Martera	Deejay, composer and drummer	Italy
Forlenzo Massarone	Singer and actor	Italy
Serena Menarini	Singer	Italy
Lorenzo Menicucci alias Marte	Radio presenter	Italy
Silvia Mezzanotte	Singer	Italy
Mietta alias of Daniela Miglietta	Singer and actress	Italy
Davide Misiano	Latin teacher and singer-songwriter	Italy
Vincenzo Molino	Deejay	Italy
Giorgio Montaldo	Musician	Italy
Leonardo Monteiro	Singer and performer	Italy
Daniele Moretti	Musician	Italy
Antonella Mosetti	Showgirl	Italy
Ylenia Oliviero	Actress and singer	Italy
Serena Ottaviani	Vocal coach	Italy
Marcella Ovani	Singer	Italy
Giulio Pangi	Actor and artistic director	Italy
Davide Papasidero (Note: Participant in the fifth edition of X Factor Italia and winner of the Castrocaro Music Festival in 2013.)	Singer-songwriter and vocal coach	Italy
Carmelo Pappalardo (Karma B)	Singer	Italy
Valentina Parisse	Singer-songwriter	Italy
Pamela Petrarolo	Singer and showgirl	Italy
Carlo Piazza	Model	Italy
David Pironaci	Vocal coach	Italy
Fernando Proce	Radio presenter, journalist and singer	Italy
Giulia Provvedi (Le Donatella)	Singer	Italy
Silvia Provvedi (Le Donatella)	Singer	Italy
Eleonora Puglia	Actress and dancer	Italy
Marica Rotondo alias Marika Voice	Vocalist and singer	Italy
Stefano Rueca alias Rueka (Alma and Rueka)	Singer	Italy
Ludovica Russo	Singer	Italy
Marco Salvati	TV author and musician	Italy
Sara Sartini	Actress	Italy
Serena Savasta	Singer, dancer and actress	Italy
Angelica Sepe	Singer-songwriter and musician	Italy
Silvia Specchio	Dancer, singer and vocalist	Italy
Maruska Starr	Vocalist	Italy
Melissa Sylla	Singer	Italy
Ben Abdallah Taoufik alias Ben Dj	Deejay	Tunisia
Manuela Tasciotti alias Palla (Palla and Chiatta)	Singer, actress and youtuber	Italy
Alessia Tavian	Obstetrician and singer	Italy
Isotta Tomazzoni	Radio host	Italy
Michele Trambusti alias Mikele	Entertainment director and presenter	Italy
Luca Valenti	Singer	Italy
Gabriella Zanchi	Lyrical singer and actress	Italy
Raffa Zanieri	Vocalist	Italy
Sunita Zucca alias Sunymao	Lyrical singer and cosplayer	India

=== Ratings ===
Episode	Date	Viewers	Share	Guests	Note
1	16 May 2019	3,190,000	17.82%	Boomdabash, Gabriele Cirilli, Andrea Pucci, Iva Zanicchi	
2	23 May 2019	2,759,000	15.32%	Gabriele Cirilli, I Legnanesi, Gessica Notaro, Fabio Rovazzi	
3	30 May 2019	2,398,000	13.86%	Paolo Jannacci, Giovanni Vernia	
4	6 June 2019	2,245,000	12.80%	Gianluca Vacchi	
Semifinal	13 June 2019	2,580,000	16.30%	Youma Diakite, Ariadna Romero, Iva Zanicchi	
Final	20 June 2019	2,710,000	19.12%	Al Bano, Ivana Čanović, Gabriele Cirilli, Youma Diakite, Nek, Ariadna Romero, Ron, Renato Zero	
Average		2,647,000	15.87%		

== Season 2 (2019-2020) ==
=== The 100 ===
Members of the 100 include:

Member	Occupation	Place of birth
Ginta	Singer	Switzerland
Sonia Addario	Singer	Italy
Lucya Allocca	Singer	Italy
Mariateresa Amato	Singer, actress, and radio presenter	Italy
Guido Ambrosini alias Bido Bè	Singer	Italy
Sabrina Antonetti alias Chiatta (Palla e Chiatta)	Singer, actress, and YouTube personality	Italy
Simona Bencini	Singer	Italy
Barbara Bonanni	Actress	Italy
Eleonora Bruno	Actress	Italy
Luca Buttiglieri	Singer and actor	Italy
Alessandra Buzzi	TV presnter	Italy
Brigida Cacciatore (Note: Contestant from season 5 of Amici di Maria De Filippi.)	Singer	Italy
Susanna Caira	Singer	Italy
Chiara Canzian	Singer	Italy
Andrea Cardillo	Singer	Italy
Benedetta Caretta (Note: Caretta previously won season 2 of Io canto.)	Singer	Italy
Claudia Casciaro (Note: Contestant from season 11 of Amici di Maria De Filippi.)	Singer	Italy
Timothy Cavicchini	Singer	Italy
Francesca Ceci	Actress	Italy
Titti Cerrone	Actress	Italy
Salvatore Cinquegrana alias Surry	YouTube star	Italy
Valeria Colombo	Actress	Italy
Beatrice De Do	Musician	Italy
Miriam Della Guardia (Note: Contestant from season 1 of Saranno famosi.)	Dancer	Italy
Fabio Demofonti alias Fabio2U	Singer	Italy
Mirkaccio alias di Mirko Dettori	Musician	Italy
Claudio Di Cicco (Note: Contestant from season 4 The Voice of Italy.)	Singer	Italy
Cizco alias from Francesco Di Roberto	TV presenter	Italy
Sherrita Duran	Singer	United States
Alessia Fabiani	Actress and showgirl	Italy
Samantha Fantauzzi (Note: Contest from season 3 of Amici di Maria De Filippi)	Actress	Italy
Lavinia Fiorani alias LaRomAntica	Singer	Italy
Valentina Gatti alias Valentina Shanti	Singer	Italy
Susanna Gecchele	Singer and TV presenter	Italy
Giancarlo Genise	Vocal coach	Italy
Nathalie Giannitrapani	Singer	Italy
Emma Gordon	Cantante	Scotland
Jonathan Heitch	Disc jockey	Domincian Republic
Valeria Iaquinto	Singer	Italy
Marco Iecher	Lawyer and songwriter	Italy
Fabio Ingrosso	Singer and radio presenter	Italy
Ylenia Iorio	Singer	Italy
Elio Irace	Musicista	Italy
Ronnie Jones	Singer-songwriter	United States
Veronica Kirchmajer	Singer	Italy
Mauro Leonardi (Karma B)	Singer	Italy
Letizia Liberati	Singer	Italy
Marco Ligabue	Musician and songwriter	Italy
Antonella Lo Coco (Note: Third place finalist on season 5 of X Factor Italia and judge on season 4 of Io canto.)	Singer	Italy
Irene Lo Cuoco	Singer	Italy
Davide Locatelli	Musician and songwriter	Italy
Davide Lomagno (Akira Manera)	Singer	Italy
Alma Manera	Singer, actress, and dancer	Italy
Morena Marangi	Singer	Italy
Marc Mari	Singer	Italy
Forlenzo Massarone	Singer and actor	Italy
Manuel Meli	Actor	Italy
Serena Menarini	Singer	Italy
Silvia Mezzanotte	Singer	Italy
Mietta alias di Daniela Miglietta	Singer and actress	Italy
Luigi Miseferi	Cabaret performer	Italy
Davide Misiano	Songwriter	Italy
Leonardo Monteiro	Singer	Italy
Marcello Morini	Singer	Italy
Luca Morisco (Akira Manera)	Singer	Italy
Giorgia Moschini	Disc jockey and musician	Italy
Ylenia Oliviero	Singer and actress	Italy
Marcella Ovani	Singer	Italy
Giulio Pangi	Actor and artistic director	Italy
Davide Papasidero (Note: Concorrente della X Factor (Italia) (quinta edizione) di X Factor Italia e vincitore, nel 2013, del Festival di Castrocaro.)	Singer vocal coach	Italy
Carmelo Pappalardo (Karma B)	Singer	Italy
Concetta Passaretta alias Ketty Passa	Singer, musician, and TV presenter	Italy
Valentina Parisse	Singer	Italy
Valeria Parlato	Singer	Italy
Carlo Piazza	Model	Italy
David Pironaci	Vocal coach	Italy
Fernando Proce	Singer, musician, and presenter	Italy
Giulia Provvedi (Le Donatella)	Singer and TV personality	Italy
Silvia Provvedi (Le Donatella)	Singer and TV personality	Italy
Veronica Rega	TV personality	Italy
Mariana Rodríguez	Model and showgirl	Venezuela
Marica Rotondo alias Marika Voice	Singer	Italy
Ludovica Russo	Singer	Italy
Sara Sartini	Actress	Italy
Danila Satragno	Actress	Italy
Serena Savasta	Singer, actress, and dancer	Italy
Andrea Scarcella	Actor	Italy
Elisa Scheffler	Model, showgirl, and journalist	Italy
Piergiorgio Severi alias Space One	Rapper	Italy
Chantal Sisto	Singer and TV personality	Italy
Maruska Starr	Singer	Italy
Melissa Sylla	Singer	Italy
Ben Abdallah Taoufik alias Ben Dj	Disc jockey	Tunisia
Manuela Tasciotti alias Palla (Palla e Chiatta)	Singer, actress, and YouTUbe star	Italy
Alessia Tavian	Singer	Italy
Isotta Tomazzoni	Radio presenter	Italy
Melita Toniolo	Showgirl, model, actress, and TV presenter	Italy
Marta Torre	Dancer, actress, and model	Italy
Luca Valenti (Note: Contestant from season 9 of X Factor Italia.)	Singer	Italy
Giorgio Vanni	Singer	Italy
Sunita Zucca alias Sunymao	Singer and cosplayer	India
Senhit	Singer	Italy

=== Ratings ===
Episode	Date	Viewers	Share	Guests	Note
1	4 December 2019	2,706,000,	16.53%	Cristiano Malgioglio, Raf, Umberto Tozzi, Iva Zanicchi	
2	12 December 2019	2,570,000	14.15%	Benji & Fede, Iva Zanicchi	
3	19 December 2019	2,583,000	14.70%	Cristiano Malgioglio, Anna Tatangelo, Iva Zanicchi	
Semifinal	26 December 2019	2,143,000	12.04%	Cristiano Malgioglio, Grido, Beppe Vessicchio, Iva Zanicchi	
Final	2 January 2020	2,851,000	16.41%	Dodi Battaglia, Gigi D'Alessio, Youma Diakite, Vittorio Grigolo, Cristiano Malgioglio, Ariadna Romero, Marco Salvati, Tony Renis	
Average		2,571,000	14.75%		

== Season 3 (2020) ==
=== The 100 ===
Members of the 100 include:

Member	Occupation	Place of birth
Ginta Biku	Singer	Switzerland
Alessia Fabiani	Actress and showgirl	Italy
Alma Manera	Singer and journalist	Italy
Andrea Cardillo	Singer	Italy
Carola Santopaolo	Actress	Italy
Claudio Di Cicco	Singer and musician	Italy
David Pironaci	Singer, artistic director and vocal coach	Italy
Elisa Riccitelli	Singer	Italy
Elisa Scheffler	Model, showgirl, and journalist	Italy
Fabio Esposito	Entrepreneur and TV presenter	Italy
Fernando Proce	Radio presenter, journalist and singer	Italy
Francesco Di Roberto alias Cizco	Singer and TV presenter	Italy
Francesco Rinaldi	Paleontologist	Italy
Georgia Moss	Disc jockey	Italy
Giada Farano	Dancer	Italy
Giancarlo Genise	Singer and vocal coach	Germany
Giorgio Vanni	Singer	Italy
Giulia Provvedi	Singer and TV presenter	Italy
Giulio Pangi	Actor and artistic director	Italy
Il Cile	Singer and musician	Italy
Irene Antonucci	Actress and comedian	Italy
Irene Lo Cuoco	Singer	Italy
Jonathan Heitch	Disc jockey	Dominican Republic
Leonardo Monteiro	Singer	Switzerland
Lucya Allocca	Singer	Italy
Ludovica Russo	Singer	Italy
Maria Grazia Nazari	Actress	Italy
Marica Rotondo	Singer	Italy
Marta Torre	Actress and dancer	Italy
Melita Toniolo	Showgirl, model, and TV presenter	Italy
Micol Ronchi	Showgirl, model, and radio presenter	Italy
Mietta	Singer and actress	Italy
Miriam Della Guardia	Dancer	Italy
Raffaele Cibelli	Singer	Italy
Roxy Colace	Actress and dancer	Italy
Sara Facciolini	Actress and showgirl	Italy
Senhit	Singer	Italy
Sherrita Duran	Singer	United States
Silvia Mezzanotte	Singer	Italy
Silvia Provvedi	Singer and TV presenter	Italy
Simona Bencini	Singer	Italy
Sonia Addario	Singer	Italy
Space One	Rapper	Italy
Susanna Caira	Singer	Italy
Sylvia Pagni	Musician and conductor	Italy
Timothy Cavicchini	Singer	Italy
Valentina Gullace	Singer	Italy
Valentina Parisse	Singer-songwriter	Italy
Veronica Rega	Actress and TV presenter	Italy

=== Ratings ===
Episode	Date	Viewers	Share	Guests	Note
1	4 November 2020	2,821,000	14.81%	–	
2	11 November 2020	3,289,000	15.97%	–	
3	18 November 2020	3,072,000	14.45%	–	
4	25 November 2020	3,150,000	14.94%	–	
Semifinal	5 December 2020	3,586,000	16.23%	Renato Zero	
Final	12 December 2020	3,784,000	18.73%	–	
Average		3,284,000	15.86%		

== Season 4 (2021) ==
=== The 100 ===
Members of the 100 include:

Member	Occupation	Place of birth
Alessia Fabiani	Actress and showgirl	Italy
Alma Manera	Singer	Italy
Andrea Cardillo	Singer/musician	Italy
Annalisa Minetti	Singer	Italy
Carola Santopaolo	Actress	Italy
Claudio Di Cicco	Singer/musician	Italy
David Pironaci	Singer and vocal coach	Italy
Elisa Riccitelli	Singer	Italy
Elisa Scheffler	Model, showgirl, and journalist	Italy
Fabio Esposito	TV presenter	Italy
Fernando Proce	Journalist and radio presenter	Italy
Francesco Di Roberto, aka Cizco	Singer and TV presenter	Italy
Francesco Rinaldi	Paleontologist	Italy
Georgia Moss	DJ	Italy
Giada Farano	Ballet dancer	Italy
Giancarlo Genise	Singer and vocal coach	Germany
Giorgio Vanni	Singer	Italy
Ginta Biku	Singer	Lithuania
Giulia Provvedi	Singer and TV presenter	Italy
Giulio Pangi	Actor	Italy
Il Cile	Musician/songwriter	Italy
Irene Antonucci	Actress and comedian	Italy
Irene Lo Cuoco	Singer	Italy
Jonathan Heitch	DJ	Domincian Republic
Leonardo Monteiro	Singer	Switzerland
Lucya Allocca	Songwriter	Italy
Ludovica Russo	Singer	Italy
Marc Mari	Opera singer	Italy
Maria Grazia Nazari	Actress	Italy
Marica Rotondo	Singer	Italy
Marta Torre	Actress and dancer	Italy
Martha Rossi	Singer	Italy
Melita Toniolo	Model, showgirl, and TV presenter	Italy
Micol Ronchi	Model, showgirl, and radio host	Italy
Miriam Della Guardia	Dancer	Italy
Raffaele Cibelli	Singer	Italy
Roberto De Rosa	Influencer	Italy
Roxy Colace	Actress and singer	Italy
Sara Facciolini	Dancer	Italy
Senhit Zadik Zadik	Singer	Italy
Sherrita Duran	Singer	United States
Silvia Mezzanotte	Singer	Italy
Silvia Provvedi	TV presenter	Italy
Simona Bencini	Singer	Italy
Sonia Addario	Singer	Italy
Space One	Rapper	Italy
Susanna Caira	Singer	Italy
Sylvia Pagni	Singer/musician	Italy
Timothy Cavicchini	Singer	Italy
Valentina Gullace	Singer/musician	Italy
Valentina Parisse	Songwriter	Italy
Veronica Rega	Actress and TV presenter	Italy
Francesca Ceci	Actress	Italy
Noa Planas	Influencer, previously in season 2 of Il collegio	Italy

=== Ratings ===
Episode	Date	Viewers	Share	Guests	Note
1	31 October 2021	2,378,000	13.50%	–	
2	7 November 2021	2,329,000	12.40%	–	
3	14 November 2021	2,584,000	12.50%	–	
4	21 November 2021	2,407,000	11.90%	–	
4	28 November 2021	2,260,000	11.50%	–	
4	5 December 2021	2,171,000	12.30%	Cristiano Malgioglio	
Semifinal	12 December 2021	2,469,000	13.91%	Nek, Francesco Gabbani, Boomdabash	
Final	19 December 2021	2,031,000	13.00%	Aurora Ramazzotti, Alberto Radaelli, Cahayadi "Eki" Kam	
Average		2,329,000	12.63%		
