= 10th anniversary of the People's Republic of China =

1959 celebrations in China

The 10th Anniversary of the Founding of The People's Republic of China 庆祝中华人民共和国成立10周年大会
- Genre: Military parade, mass pageant, music and dance gala
- Date: 1 October 1959
- Frequency: Select years (Note: Since the founding of the people's republic until 2009, the country has held 14 National Day grand military parades in 1949–1959, 1984, 1999, and 2009.)
- Locations: Chang'an Avenue, Tiananmen Square, Beijing, China
- Coordinates: 39°54′26.4″N 116°23′27.9″E
- Years active: 77
- Inaugurated: 1 October 1949
- Participants: PLA, PAP, the Militia, and other formations
- Leader: Mao Zedong (chairman)
- People: Yang Yong (chief commander of the military parade)

The 10th anniversary celebrations of founding of the People's Republic of China were held on 1 October 1959. The main event was held in Tiananmen Square in Beijing. A grand banquet with many international dignitaries had been organized on the preceding evening.

Celebrations in Beijing

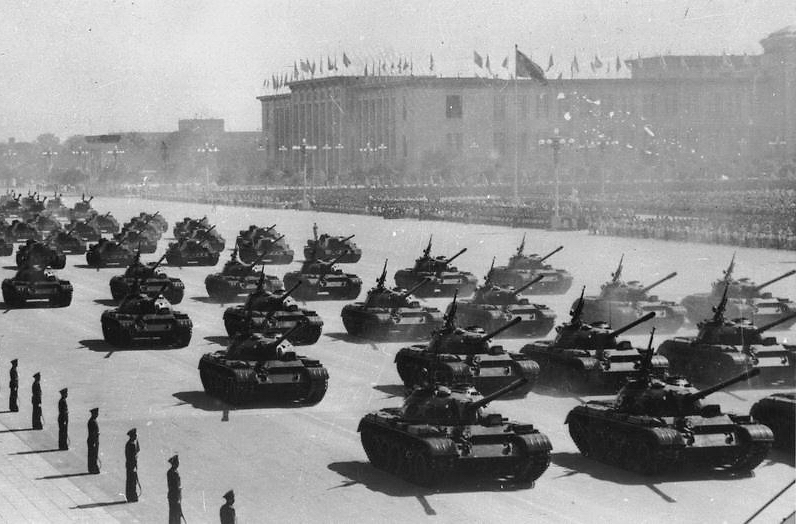
Tank columns on Chang'an Avenue.

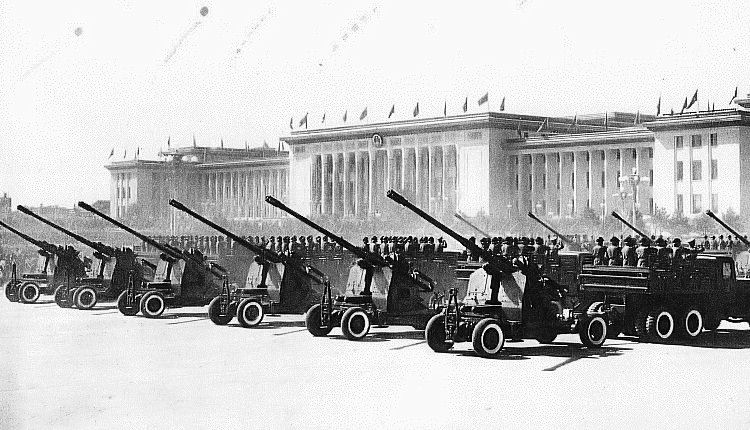
Anti-aircraft guns in the military parade before the Great Hall of the People.

== Celebrations in Beijing ==
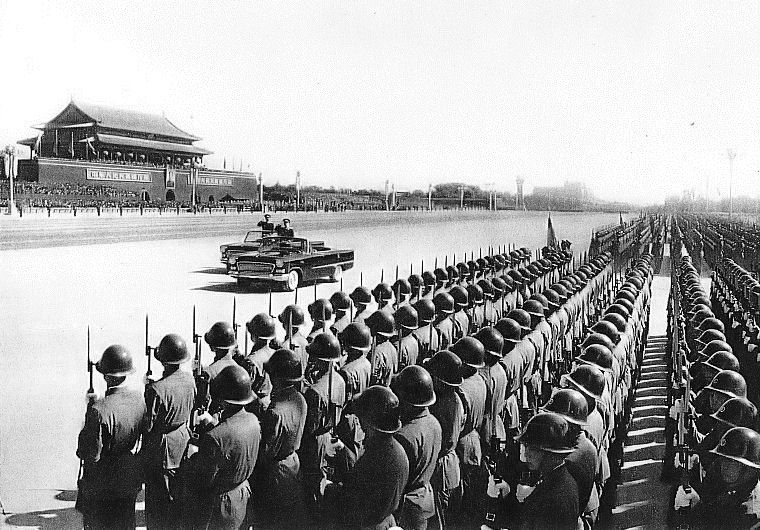
Defense Minister Lin Biao surveys the troops in Tiananmen Square.

=== 28–29 September celebratory meeting ===
On 28 and 29 September 1959 a meeting of more than 10,000 people was held in the Great Hall of the People. Chairman Mao Zedong and President Liu Shaoqi were present at the dias. President Liu Shaoqi held a keynote speech at the meeting. Prominent international guests at the event included Ho Chi Minh, Mikhail Suslov, Emil Bodnăraș, Hermann Matern, Mehmet Shehu, Dimitar Ganev, István Dobi, Aleksander Zawadzki, Yumjaagiin Tsedenbal, Kim Il Sung and Antonín Novotný.

=== 30 September banquet ===
On the evening of 30 September 1959, a jubilee banquet was hosted in the Great Hall of the People. Around 5,000 people attended the banquet, including guests from around 80 countries. Mao Zedong and Soviet Premier Nikita Khrushchev entered the hall together, meeting applause. Chinese Premier Zhou Enlai and Soviet Premier Khrushchev presented their greetings at the banquet. The Soviet Foreign Minister Andrei Gromyko also participated in the banquet.

Khrushchev had arrived directly from a visit to the United States on the same day. He held a short speech upon his arrival at the airport.

=== 1 October Tiananmen Square parade ===
According to Chinese media, the Tiananmen Square event gathered 700,000 people. At Tiananmen Square participants formed a human version of the national emblem of the People's Republic with the numerals '1949' and '1959' on the sides. A band of one thousand musicians with brass instruments and olive-green uniforms opened the event, playing The East is Red at 09.45. At this point Mao Zedong and Nikita Khrushchev entered the dias. Other dignitaries on the dias included Liu Shaoqi, Soong Ching-ling, Lin Biao, Zhu De, Dong Biwu, Deng Xiaoping and various international guests.

Celebrations in other cities

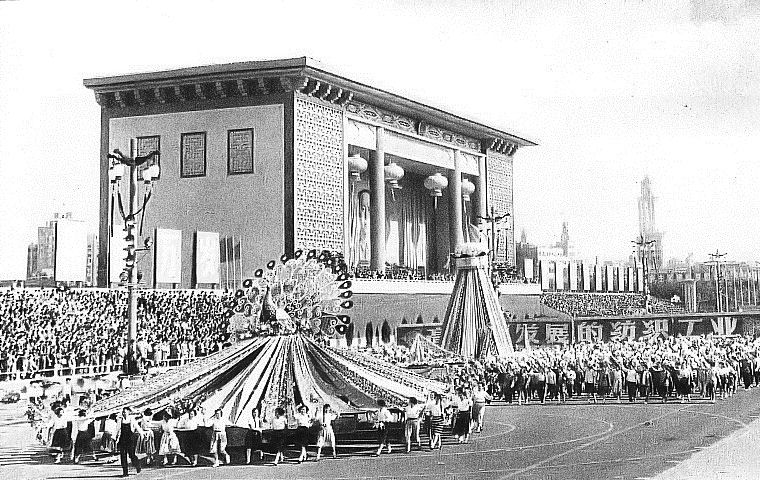
Shanghai

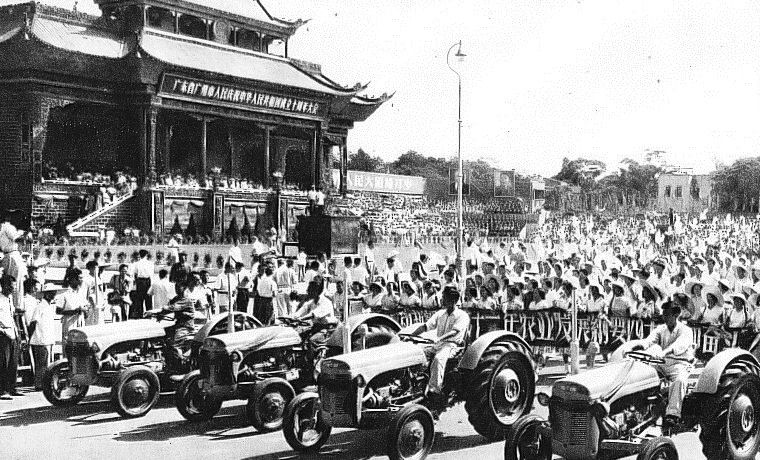
Guangzhou

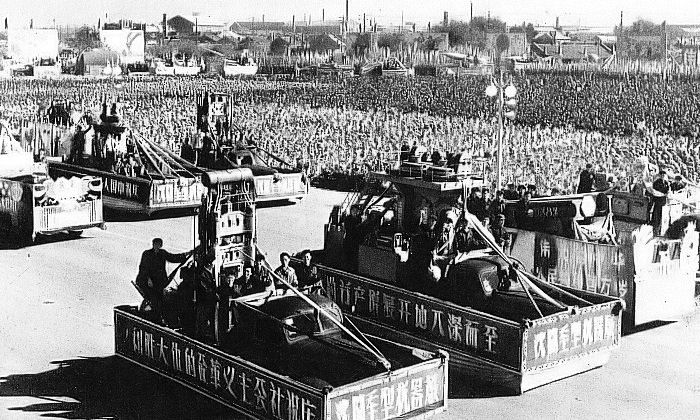
Shenyang

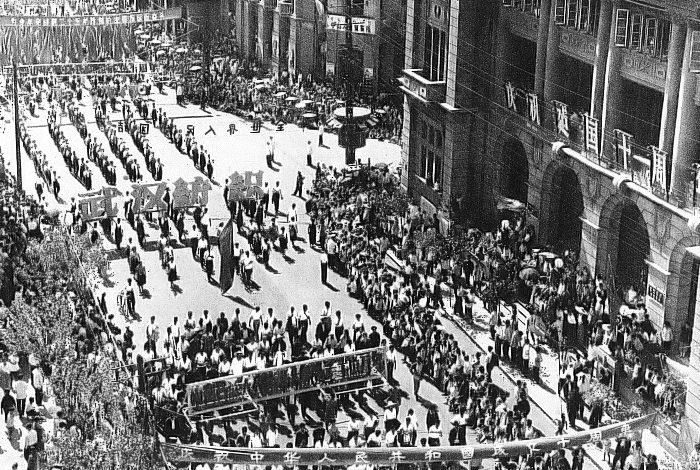
Wuhan

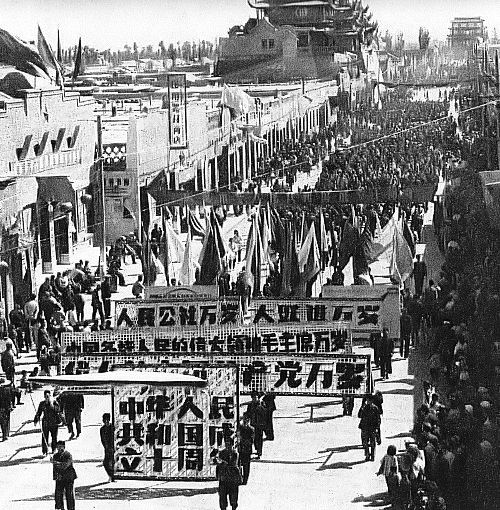
Yinchuan

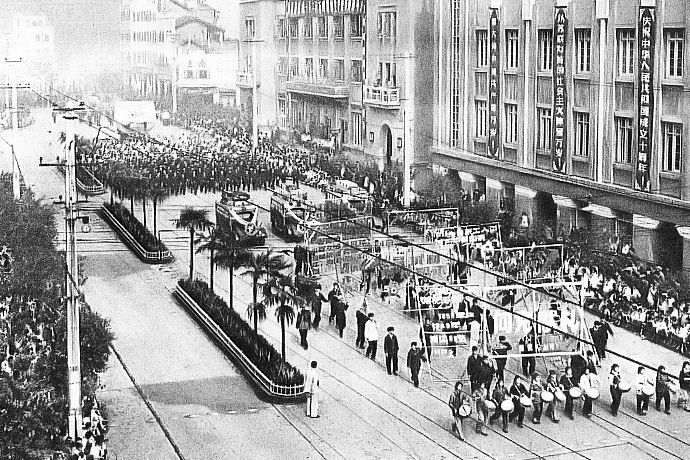
Chongqing.

The mayor of Peking, Peng Zhen, declared the ceremony open at 10.00. The national anthem was played and a delegation of 400 Young Pioneers presented a floral tribute at the People's Heroes Monument.

After a speech by Defense Minister Lin Biao, a military parade began, followed by a parade of workers, peasants, students and athletes.

== International delegations at the main events in Beijing ==
At the 30 September banquet, a number of international delegations assisted, representing communist and workers parties and governments.

=== State delegations ===
Country	Name	Position
Afghanistan	Ghulam Mohammed Sherzad	Minister of Commerce
Albania	Mehmet Shehu	Prime Minister of Albania
Algeria	Benyoucef Benkhedda	Minister of Social Welfare
Bulgaria	Dimitar Ganev	Chairman of the Presidium of the National Assembly
Burma	U Chit Thaung	Minister of Culture
Czechoslovakia	Antonín Novotný	President of Czechoslovakia
East Germany	Hermann Matern	Chairman of the Central Party Control Commission of the Socialist Unity Party
Guinea	Diawadou Barry	Minister of Education
Hungary	István Dobi	Chairman of the Presidential Council
Iraq	Ahmad Muhammed Yahia	Minister for Internal Affairs
Nepal	Dr. Tulsi Giri	Minister for Village Development
North Korea	Kim Il Sung	Premier of North Korea
North Korea	Kim Kwang Hyup	Minister of People's Armed Forces
Mongolia	Yumjaagiin Tsedenbal	Chairman of the Council of Ministers
Poland	Aleksander Zawadzki	Chairman of the State Council
Romania	Emil Bodnăraș	First Vice President of the Council of Ministers
Soviet Union	Nikita Khrushchev	Premier of the Soviet Union
Soviet Union	Mikhail Suslov	Secretary of Ideology of the Communist Party of the Soviet Union
Sudan	A. M. Gubara	Registrar of the University of Khartoum
North Vietnam	Ho Chi Minh	President of the Democratic Republic of Vietnam
North Vietnam	Võ Nguyên Giáp	Commander-in-Chief of the People's Army of Vietnam
Yemen	Sayed Ali Al-Muyyad	Minister of State

=== International organizations ===
Organization	Name	Position
World Federation of Trade Unions	Sugiri	Secretariat Member
World Peace Council	John Desmond Bernal,	Executive President
Women's International Democratic Federation	Marie-Claude Vaillant-Couturier	Vice President
World Federation of Democratic Youth	Christian Echard	General Secretary
Afro-Asian People's Solidarity Organisation	Youssef El-Sebai	General Secretary
International Union of Students	Jiří Pelikán	President
International Association of Democratic Lawyers	Denis Nowell Pritt	President

=== Party delegations ===
- Algerian Communist Party (Larbi Bouhali)
- Communist Party of Argentina (Victorio Codovilla)
- Brazilian Communist Party (Luis Carlos Prestes)
- Communist Party of Bolivia (Jesús Lara)
- Labor-Progressive Party, Canada (Nelson Clarke)
- Communist Party of Chile (José González)
- Colombian Communist Party (Víctor J. Merchán)
- People's Vanguard Party, Costa Rica (Arnoldo Ferreto)
- Popular Socialist Party, Cuba (Anibal Escalante)
- Communist Party of Ecuador (Alejandro Idrovo)
- Guatemalan Party of Labour
- Mexican Communist Party
- Socialist Party of Nicaragua
- Paraguayan Communist Party (Rogelio Espíndola)
- Communist Party of Uruguay (Enrique Rodríguez)
- Communist Party of Venezuela (Jesús Faría)
- Communist Party of Australia (Lance Sharkey)
- Communist Party of Ceylon (K.P. de Silva)
- Communist Party of India (Ajoy Ghosh)
- Communist Party of Indonesia (Njoto)
- Tudeh Party of Iran ('Tubali')
- Iraqi Communist Party (Mohammed Hussein Abu al-Iss)
- Israeli Communist Party (Tzvi Breitstein)
- Japanese Communist Party (Sanzo Nosaka)
- Jordanian Communist Party (Fu'ad Nassar)
- Lebanese Communist Party (Hasan Qraytim)
- Communist Party of Nepal (Keshar Jung Rayamjhi)
- Communist Party of New Zealand (V. G. Wilcox)
- Syrian Communist Party (Khaled Bakdash)
- Communist Party of Austria (Johann Koplenig)
- Communist Party of Belgium (Franz van den Branden)
- Communist Party of Denmark (Robert Sartori)
- Communist Party of Finland (Aimo Aaltonen)
- French Communist Party (Waldeck Rochet)
- Communist Party of Germany ('Karl')
- Communist Party of Great Britain (Harry Pollitt)
- Communist Party of Greece (Apostolos Grozos)
- People's Unity Party – Socialist Party, Iceland (Eggert Þorbjarnarson)
- Italian Communist Party (Girolamo Li Causi)
- Communist Party of Luxembourg (Dominique Urbany)
- Communist Party of the Netherlands (G. Pothoven)
- Communist Party of Norway (Jørgen Vogt)
- Portuguese Communist Party
- Sammarinese Communist Party (Umberto Barulli)
- Communist Party of Spain (Dolores Ibárruri)
- Communist Party of Sweden (Hilding Hagberg)
- Swiss Party of Labour (Guido Cavagna)
- Communist Party of Turkey

== Other commemorations ==
In Beijing, ten "great buildings" were constructed ahead of the celebrations. The most prominent of the ten was the Great Hall of the People. On 26 September 1959, just a few days ahead of the anniversary, oil was discovered at Datongzhen. Datong Town and the oilfields were renamed 'Daqing' ('Great Celebration'), in reference to the tenth anniversary celebrations. Major parades were also organized in Shanghai, Chongqing, Guangzhou, Xi'an, Wuhan, Shenyang and Tianjin.

== See also ==
- History of Beijing
