= Cavagna =

Cavagna is an Italian surname. Notable people with the surname include:

- Angela Cavagna (born 1966), Italian showgirl, model, and television personality
- Giovan Battista Cavagna (c. 1545–1613), Italian architect
- Giovanni Cavagna (born 1934), Italian physiologist
- Giovanni Paolo Cavagna (1550–1627), Italian painter
- Guido Cavagna (born 1917–?), Swiss politician
- Janis Cavagna (born 1995), Italian football player
- Marco Cavagna (1958–2005), Italian astronomer
- Matteo Cavagna (born 1984), Italian footballer
- Matteo Cavagna (born 1985), Italian footballer
- Rémi Cavagna (born 1995), French professional cyclist

== See also ==
- 10149 Cavagna, asteroid
