= Ariadna Romero =

Cuban actress

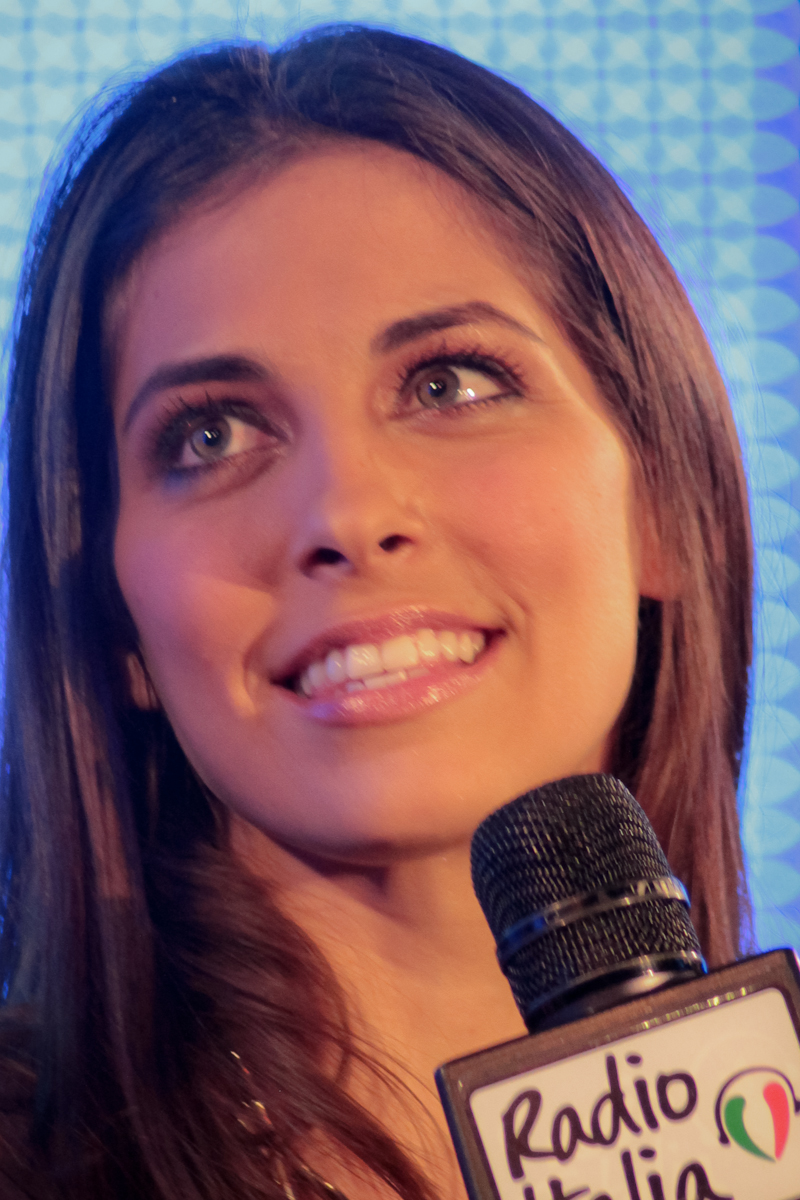
- Ariadna Romero in December 2011
- Born: Ariadna Romero; September 19, 1986 (age 40); Fomento, Cuba
- Occupations: Model, showgirl, actress, television personality
- Years active: 2009 - present
- Spouse: Lorenzo Gergati (m. 2012; div. 2015)
- Partner: Pierpaolo Pretelli (2015–2018)
- Children: 1
- Modeling information
- Height: 172 cm (5 ft 8 in)
- Hair color: Brown
- Eye color: Green
- Website: http://www.ariadnaromero.it/

Ariadna Romero (born 19 September 1986 in Fomento) is a Cuban model and actress.

== Biography ==
Romero started her career as a model in 2009 when a talent scout, during her first photoshoot in Cuba with an Italian troupe, asked her to move to Italy, where she lives between Milan and Turin; in 2011 she debuted as actress becoming the female lead in Leonardo Pieraccioni's feature film Finalmente la felicità. Romero in the winter of 2012 took part (with Bobo Vieri, Alex Belli, Andrés Gil, Anna Tatangelo, Ria Antoniou and other contestant) in the 8th season of the Italian talent show Ballando con le Stelle hosted on Rai 1 by Milly Carlucci with Paolo Belli and his Big Band. Romero in the autumn of 2013 took part, with Francesca Fioretti, in the second season of Pechino Express, the Italian version (aired on Rai 2 and hosted by Costantino della Gherardesca) of the international reality show Peking Express, and in that reality-game the couple Romero-Fioretti obtained good reviews and the second place.

Romero in the autumn of 2014 participated as showgirl, with others, in La papera non fa l'eco, a variety show hosted on Rai 2 by Max Giusti. Romero in 2015 took part, with Fabio Tavelli, Studio EuroBasket, a program aired by Sky Sport Italia, channel of Rupert Murdoch's Sky Italia. During her career over the years, Romero participated as model in many advertising campaigns. Romero won the Italian prize Premio Eilat Diamonds (Eilat Diamonds Award) in July 2016 «per i suoi successi professionali e per il perfetto connubio tra bellezza e talento» («for her professional achievements and the perfect combination of beauty and talent»).

In the same year (2016), Romero was the female lead in the Roberto Capucci's feature film Ovunque tu sarai. Romero in 2017 obtained the role of Nora Segni in The Broken Key, an English-language Italian independent film written and directed by Louis Nero. Romero in the winter of 2019 took part (with Youma Diakite, Jeremias Rodríguez, Riccardo Fogli, Abdelkader Ghezzal, Marco Maddaloni and other contestant) in the 14th season of L'isola dei famosi, the Italian version (aired by Canale 5 and hosted by Alessia Marcuzzi with Alvin) of Celebrity Survivor, an international reality show. Romero took part as showgirl in the 1st season (June 2019) and in the 2nd season (January 2020) of All Together Now, a reality television music competition aired by Canale 5 and hosted by Michelle Hunziker as presenter with J-Ax as captain. Romero in 2019 was also a guest star in two comedy programs of Rai 2, precisely Made in Sud, hosted by Fatima Trotta, and Stasera tutto è possibile, hosted by Stefano De Martino.

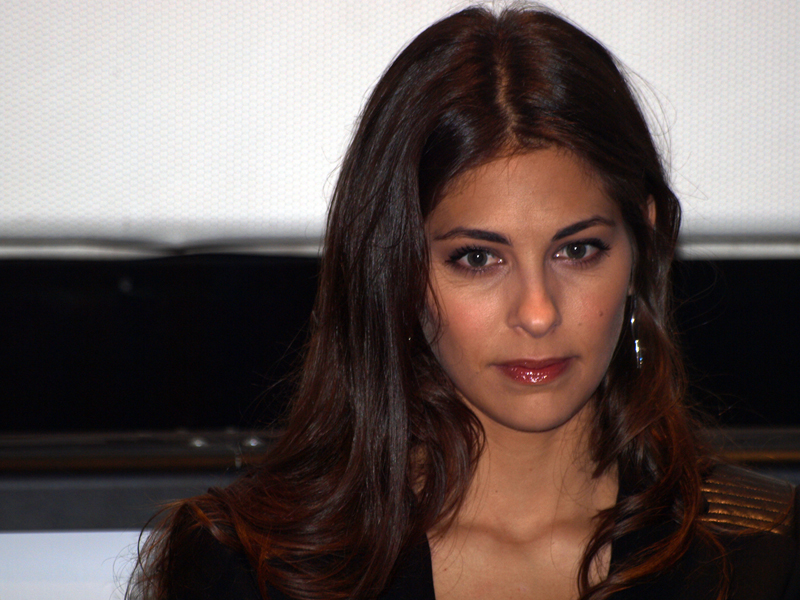
Ariadna Romero (December 2011)

== Personal life ==
Romero married the Italian basketball player Lorenzo Gergati in a civil ceremony in Varese on 20 December 2012; the Catholic ceremony was celebrated on 7 July 2013 in Cuba. Their marriage ended in 2015, when Romero met the model Pierpaolo Petrelli: they have a son together named Leonardo Petrelli who was born on 18 July 2017, but the relationship of Leonardo's parents ended in April 2018. In August 2023, it was revealed that Romero is in a relationship with Julio Iglesias Jr.

== Career ==
=== Filmography ===
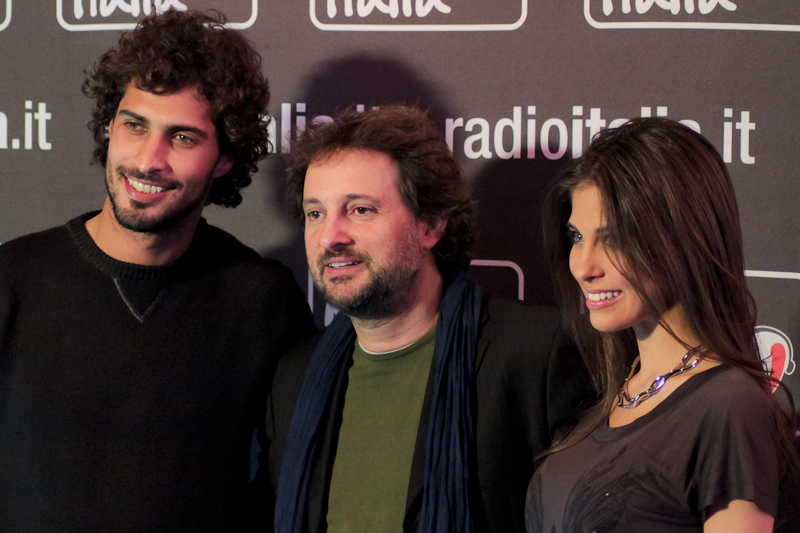
Thyago Alves, Leonardo Pieraccioni and Ariadna Romero at the preview of the film Finalmente la felicità in Cologno Monzese (Milan, Lombardy, Italy) at Radio Italia in 2011

- Finalmente la felicità, directed by Leonardo Pieraccioni (2011)
- Ovunque tu sarai, directed by Roberto Capucci (2016)
- The Broken Key, directed by Louis Nero (2017)

=== Television ===
- Quelli che il calcio (Rai 2, 2009–2010)
- Jukebox (Milan Channel, 2009–2013)
- Ballando con le stelle 8 (Rai 1, 2012)
- Pechino Express - Obiettivo Bangkok (Rai 2, 2013)
- Studio EuroBasket (Sky Sport, 2015)
- L'isola dei famosi (Canale 5, 2019)
- Made in Sud (Rai 2, 2019)
- All Together Now (Canale 5, 2019–2020)
- Stasera tutto è possibile (Rai 2, 2019)

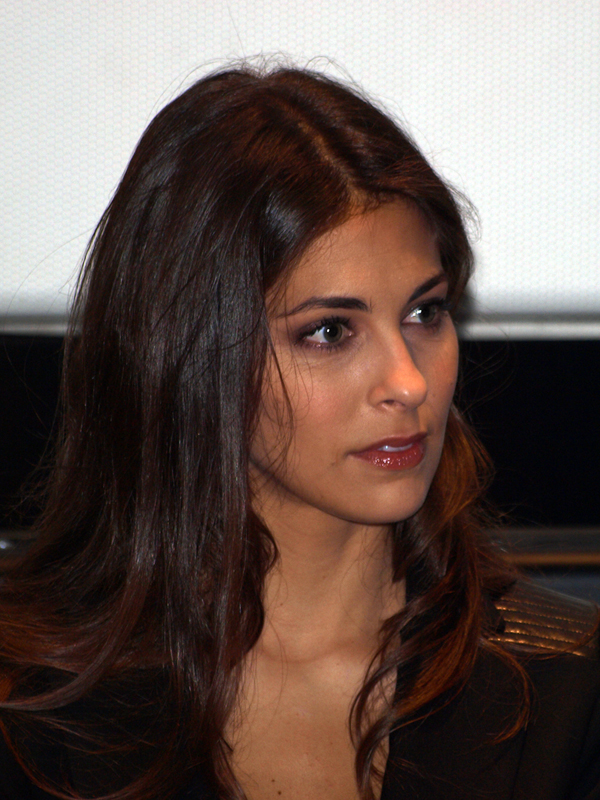
Ariadna Romero (December 2011)

=== Videoclip ===
- 2010 - Boom Boom of Mitch e Squalo

=== Advertising campaigns ===
- Vecchia Romagna (2010-today)
- Sammontana (2010)
- Locman donna (2010)
- Cotril (2011-today)
- Pin Up Stars (2011-2012)
- Testimonial of the charity campaigns of AIL (2013)
- Jeep Compass (2013)
- White le Spose (2014-today)
- TIM (2015)
- Pomodoro Petti (2016-today)
