= Ancora (disambiguation) =

Ancora is a 2005 album by operatic pop group Il Divo.

Ancora may also refer to:

- "Ancora", an ancient anchor-shaped philological sign found on some Papyri
- Ancora, New Jersey, an unincorporated community within Winslow Township, Camden County
  - Ancora Psychiatric Hospital, in the above community
- Ancora String Quartet, based in Madison, Wisconsin
- Ancora (Eduardo de Crescenzo album) 1981
- "Ancora", song from Ancora (Eduardo de Crescenzo album), covered by Mina, Anna Oxa, Ornella Vanoni
- "Ancora", art song by Paolo Tosti
- "Ancora", piano composition by Ludovico Einaudi
- Ancora Holdings Group, a wealth management and advisory firm in Cleveland, Ohio
