= InfoPrice =

- Founders: Paulo Fernandes Garcia Neto; Marcus Roggero; Gustavo Glasser; Leonardo Sierra Monteiro
- Headquarters: São Paulo, Brazil
- Number of employees: 450
- Website: infoprice.co

InfoPrice is a technology and data company, a Brazilian business intelligence startup focused on pricing and dynamic pricing for retail, created to enable its customers, retailers (supermarkets, hypermarkets, pharmacies) and industries, to improve their margins, increase their sales and better define their pricing strategies, collecting data through proprietary patented hardware, facilitating the monitoring of competitors' prices.

One curious fact is that one of its founders, Leonardo Sierra Monteiro, was a child actor in the Disney CRUJ series when he was ten years old, his character was called Guelé, who was transformed into the ultra-young revolutionary Chiclé.

== SmartPrice ==
A patented barcode reproduction device that facilitates collection in physical retail, created by Leonardo when co-founding InfoPrice.

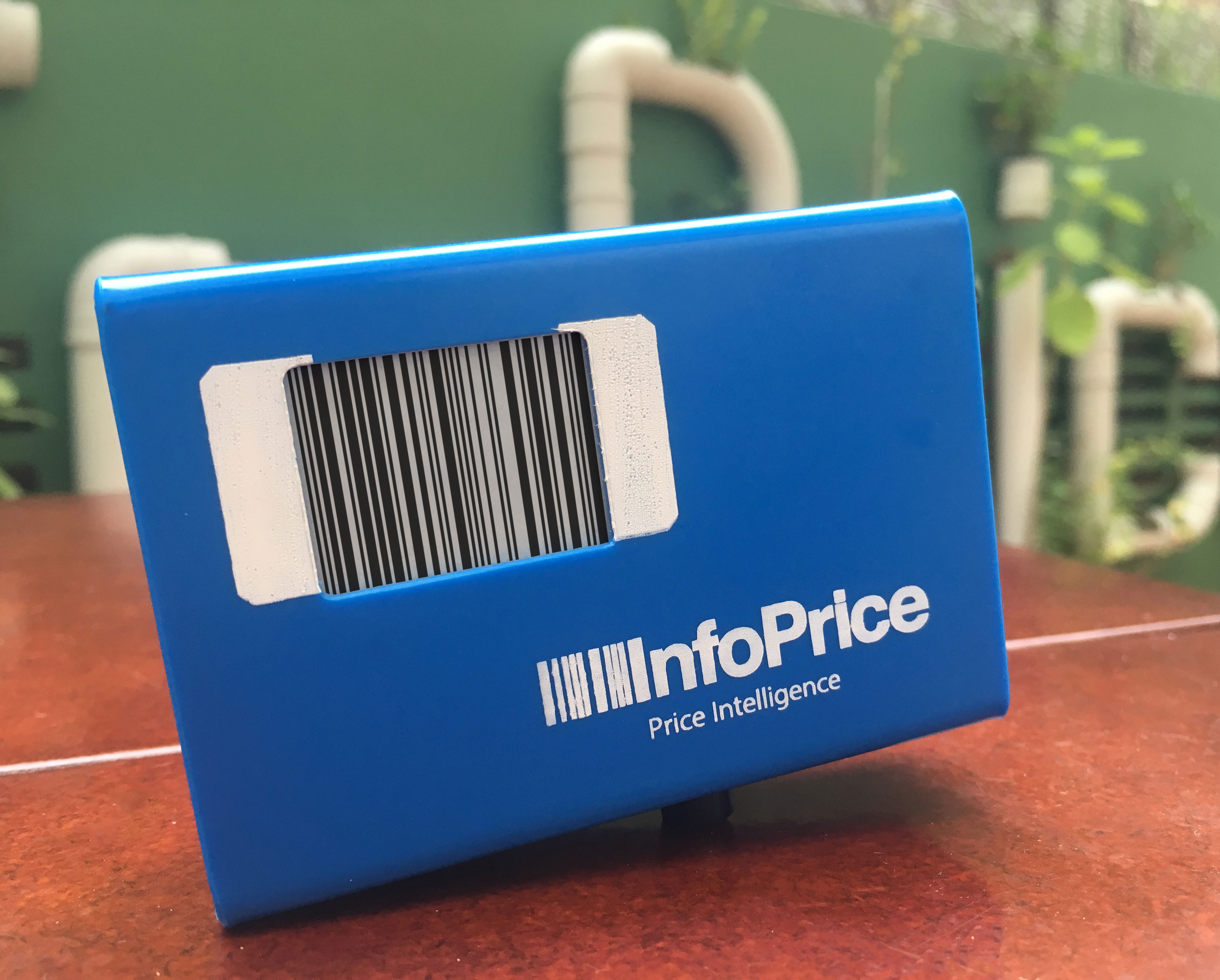
SmartPrice, for price collection assistance

== See also ==
- Revionics
- Ipsos
