= Andrew Sewell =

Andrew Sewell may refer to:

- Andrew K. Sewell, British immunologist
- Andrew Sewell (priest), British Archdeacon of Maidstone
- Andrew Sewell, conductor with the Wisconsin Chamber Orchestra
