= Finalmente la felicità =

- Film poster
- Directed by: Leonardo Pieraccioni
- Written by: Leonardo Pieraccioni; Giovanni Veronesi
- Starring: Leonardo Pieraccioni; Ariadna Romero; Rocco Papaleo; Thyago Alves
- Cinematography: Mark Melville
- Edited by: Stefano Chierchiè
- Music by: Gianluca Sibaldi
- Release date: 16 December 2011
- Running time: 93 minutes
- Country: Italy
- Language: Italian

Finalmente la felicità is a 2011 film directed by and starring Leonardo Pieraccioni.

== Plot ==
Benedetto is a music professor of Lucca, who discovers that his recently died mother adopted a Brazilian girl. The girl is now working as a model and she is coming to Italy to know her brother.

== Cast ==
- Leonardo Pieraccioni as Benedetto Parisi
- Ariadna Romero as Luna Parisi
- Rocco Papaleo as Sandrino Terracciano
- Andrea Buscemi as Argante Buscemi
- Thyago Alves as Jesus
- Shel Shapiro as Albert
- Michela Andreozzi as Mary
- Maurizio Battista as the man on the train
- Fabien Lucciarini as François
- Paola Roberti as Annette
- Maria De Filippi as herself
- Barbara Bouchet as herself
- Massimo Ceccherini as the man in the hospital
