= Alessia Fabiani =

Italian model, showgirl and TV presenter

- Born: 10 December 1976 (age 49); L'Aquila, Italy
- Occupations: Showgirl, model, television personality
- Website: stripesandpois.com/tag/alessia-fabiani-blog/

Alessia Fabiani (born 10 December 1976) is an Italian model, showgirl and TV presenter.

She was born in L'Aquila. After working for some years as model and after performing minor roles in TV shows, she became Letterina ("Letter-carrier") in Canale 5's Passaparola. She later participated in the Italian version of The Farm.

== Biography ==
She was born in L'Aquila in 1976. As a child, she participated in the sit-com Orazio, in which she played the daughter of protagonists Maurizio Costanzo and Simona Izzo. In 1994 she began working in the world of fashion and Television after winning that year's edition of Bellissima (a beauty contest produced by Mediaset as opposed to Miss Italia, then broadcast by RAI). Her victory in the contest brought her a contract with Riccardo Gay's fashion agency and allowed her to host the 1995 edition paired with Alberto Castagna, and to participate in several programs on fashion always for Mediaset networks. In 1997 she was one of the literati on the program The Cat and the Fox, hosted by Paolo Bonolis. In 1999 she sang with Velvet 99 a cover of the song These Boots Are Made for Walkin'. Great fame among television audiences came in 1999, when she joined as "Letterina" in the cast of The Alphabet Game with Gerry Scotti, where she remained until 2002.

In June 2000, together with other former winners of the beauty contest Bellissima, she joined Gerry Scotti on Canale 5 in hosting Bellissima d'Italia. In the same year she has a small part in the film Odd Days, by Dominick Tambasco. In 2003 she was the new truncée of Uomini e Donne and later made her acting debut in the theater, as the lead actress together with Nadia Rinaldi in the Musical theatre Finalmente mi sposo, directed by Marco Lapi. In the same year she starred in the Nude calendar of the monthly Maxim magazine, shot by Photographer Roberto Rocco, and in the following year she again starred without veils in the Controcampo calendar together with Mascia Ferri. She participates as a contestant together with colleague and ex-Letterina Alessia Mancini in the variety show La sai l'ultima? VIP. In 2005, she is a correspondent for the program Lucignolo and, with Alessia Ventura, Mascia Ferri and Giada De Blanck, she is a correspondent in Spain for the Italia 1 docu-reality On the Road.

In the same year she joined Massimo De Luca as host on Pressing Champions League and posed for the 2006 Fapim calendar made by photographer Gaetano Mansi, the year she participated in the reality show La Fattoria season 3, being eliminated during the ninth episode with 65 percent of the vote. In the 2006/2007 TV season, she worked as a showgirl in the program Guida al campionato aired on Italia 1 and made a brief appearance in the TV movie Piper by Carlo Vanzin. She also conducted on Italia 1 the quiz-game Camerino virtuale - The Box Game. In 2008 he graduated in Cultural Heritage Science from the University of Milan, with a thesis entitled Sergiei Diaghilev and the Birth of the Ballets Russes.

Since 2013 she has devoted herself mainly to Theatre, taking part as an actress in several shows. She also ran her own fashion Blog on the Internet. On April 9, 2016 she was awarded at the Avezzano Festival with the "Premio Civiltà dei Marsi" for her activity as a theater actress. In 2018 she is in the cast of the film Loro (film), by Paolo Sorrentino.
