= Ancora String Quartet =

The Ancora String Quartet is a string quartet based in Madison, Wisconsin. The quartet was founded in Madison in 2000. Its musicians studied at some of the leading music schools in the United States, including the New England Conservatory of Music, the Eastman School of Music, the Indiana University School of Music, and the University of Texas-Austin; they also serve as members of the Madison Symphony Orchestra, the Wisconsin Chamber Orchestra, the Madison Bach Musicians, and other groups.

== Members ==
The current members of the Ancora String Quartet are:

- Wes Luke, first violin
- Robin Ryan, second violin
- Marika Fischer Hoyt, viola
- Dr. Benjamin Whitcomb, cello

Former members of the quartet include Leanne Kelso League, Laura Burns, Cynthia Bittar, and Eleanor Bartsch (first violin) and Susan Bestul (cello).

== History ==
The Ancora String Quartet became the String Quartet In Residence at the First Unitarian Society of Madison in 2006. They established a recital season there, garnering praise from music critics. They have also appeared twice on Wisconsin Public Radio's Sunday Afternoon Live From the Chazen series, broadcast live statewide, on Jan. 14, 2007 and April 6, 2008.

In September 2008 the Ancora String Quartet launched its 2008-2009 Critics' Choice Season, featuring recital programs selected especially for the quartet by local music critics.
