= La Fattoria season 3 =

La Fattoria 3 is the third edition of The farm is one that has proved most successful and has had more time, in fact, held from February 15 to May 20, 2006 on Channel 5, for 13 weeks. Barbara D'Urso confirmed to run, now an expert presenter of reality, while on location in Morocco has sent the actor Francesco Salvi. The program ran for a total of 14 episodes plus a finale celebration. Originally broadcast on Wednesday evening, in subsequent episodes have found a permanent place on Saturday evening [1] (with a midweek episode aired Wednesday, May 3). The theme of the program was "Caravan Petrol" by Renato Carosone, which was changed the "Allah Allah Allah" in "Pasha Pasha Pasha" to make the song more consistent with the ironic style of delivery, focusing on the figure of the pasha (leader).

== Contestants ==
1. Rosario Rannisi – TV Collaborator.
2. Clemente Pernarella – Actor.
3. Justine Mattera – Showgirl & Actress.
4. Angela Cavagna – Showgirl.
5. Katia Ricciarelli – Soprano.
6. Selvaggia Lucarelli – TV Host.
7. Francesco Arca – Ex-Uomini e Donne Contestant.
8. Jennipher Rodriguez – Model & Showgirl.
9. Alessia Fabiani – Showgirl
10. Ivano Michetti e Silvano Michetti de I cugini di campagna – Group of Singers.
11. Aldo Montano – Fencer.
12. Leopoldo Mastelloni – Actor.
13. Pamela Petrarolo – Showgirl & Singer.
14. Marcus Schenkenberg – Supermodel.
15. Randi Ingerman – Model & Actress.
16. Alvaro Vitali – Actor.
17. Natalie Kriz – Model & Showgirl.

== Nominations ==
	Round 1	Round 2	Round 3	Round 4	Round 5	Round 6	Round 7	Round 8	Round 9	Round 10	Round 11		Round 12	Final	
Farm Leader	Clemente	Alvaro	Aldo; Montano	Justine	Alessia	Francesco	Jennipher Rodriguez	Katia	Angela	Justine	Clemente	Rosario	Clemente	-	
Rosario									Exempt	Clemente	Selvaggia	Clemente	Justine	Winner (Day 88)	
Rosario									Exempt	Clemente	Selvaggia	Katia	Justine	Winner (Day 88)	
Clemente	Angela	Randi	Marcus	Alessia	Katia	Alessia	Alessia	Alessia	Katia	Rosario	Angela	Angela	Angela	Runner-Up (Day 88)	
Clemente	Selvaggia	Randi	Marcus	Alessia	Katia	Alessia	Alessia	Alessia	Katia	Rosario	Angela	Katia	Angela	Runner-Up (Day 88)	
Justine			Exempt	Cugini di Campagna	Katia	Aldo	Alessia	Alessia	Katia	Francesco	Katia	Angela	Rosario	3rd Place (Day 88)	
Justine			Exempt	Cugini di Campagna	Katia	Aldo	Alessia	Alessia	Katia	Francesco	Katia	Katia	Rosario	3rd Place (Day 88)	
Angela	Evicted (Day 1)			Exempt	Katia	Aldo	Alessia	Alessia	Jennipher	Rosario	Selvaggia	Clemente	Justine	Evicted (Day 81)	
Angela	Evicted (Day 1)			Exempt	Katia	Aldo	Alessia	Alessia	Jennipher	Rosario	Selvaggia	Justine	Justine	Evicted (Day 81)	
Katia	Jennipher	Randi	Marcus	Jennipher	Cugini di Campagna	Aldo	Clemente	Justine	Selvaggia	Rosario	Selvaggia	Angela	Evicted (Day 81)		
Katia	Jennipher	Randi	Marcus	Jennipher	Cugini di Campagna	Aldo	Clemente	Justine	Selvaggia	Rosario	Selvaggia	Clemente	Evicted (Day 81)		
Selvaggia	Francesco	Randi	Francesco	Alessia	Katia	Katia	Alessia	Alessia	Katia	Rosario	Katia	Evicted (Day 78)			
Francesco	Leopoldo	Randi	Clemente	Pamela	Aldo	Justine	Clemente	Clemente	Clemente	Clemente	Evicted (Day 74)				
Jennipher	Natalie	Katia	Pamela	Katia	Katia	Aldo	Cugini di Campagna	Clemente	Clemente	Evicted (Day 67)					
Alessia	Pamela	Pamela	Pamela	Pamela	Leopoldo	Aldo	Clemente	Selvaggia	Evicted (Day 60)						
Cugini di Campagna			Exempt	Pamela	Katia	Katia	Clemente	Evicted (Day 53)							
Aldo	Randi Ingerman	Randi Ingerman	Jennipher Rodriguez	Jennipher Rodriguez	Cugini di Campagna	Clemente Pernarella	Evicted (Day 43)								
Leopoldo	Jennipher	Randi	Marcus	Aldo	Aldo	Evicted (Day 36)									
Pamela	Natalie	Randi	Marcus	Jennipher	Evicted (Day 29)										
Marcus	Pamela	Pamela	Clemente	Evicted (Day 22)											
Randi	Natalie	Katia	Evicted (Day 15)												
Alvaro	Randi	Selvaggia	Walked (Day 15)												
Natalie	Randi	Evicted (Day 8)													
Nominated by Leader	Selvaggia	Selvaggia	Jennipher	Cugini di Campagna	Leopoldo	Justine	Cugini di Campagna	Justine	Jennipher	Francesco	Angela	–	–	-	
Contestant Nominated	Natalie	Randi	Marcus	Pamela	Katia	Aldo	Clemente	Alessia	Katia	Rosario	Selvaggia	Clemente; Katia	Justine; Angela	Clemente; Justine; Rosario	
Walked	None	Alvaro	None												
Eliminati	Angela to evict	Randi 69% to evict	Marcus 54% to evict	Pamela 55% to evict	Leopoldo 52% to evict	Aldo 65% to evict	Cugini di Campagna 68% to evict	Alessia 65% to evict	Jennipher 59% to evict	Francesco 67% to evict	Selvaggia 73% to evict	Katia 54% to evict	Angela 67% to evict	Justine ??% (out of 3)	Clemente; 45% (out of 2)
Eliminati	Natalie; 51% per eliminare	Randi 69% to evict	Marcus 54% to evict	Pamela 55% to evict	Leopoldo 52% to evict	Aldo 65% to evict	Cugini di Campagna 68% to evict	Alessia 65% to evict	Jennipher 59% to evict	Francesco 67% to evict	Selvaggia 73% to evict	Katia 54% to evict	Angela 67% to evict	Rosario; 55% to win	
