= Concerts on the Square =

Annual summertime concert event

Coordinates: 43°4′28″N 89°23′5″W

- Genre: Pops & Classical Orchestra
- Begins: 7 pm Wednesday nights starting the last week of June
- Frequency: Weekly, late June to late July
- Locations: King Street corner of the Capitol Square, Madison, Wisconsin, United States
- Years active: 40
- Inaugurated: 1983
- Attendance: 35,000 per concert in 2019
- Budget: $183,350 per concert
- Organiser: Wisconsin Chamber Orchestra
- Website: wcoconcerts.org/concerts-tickets/concerts-on-the-square

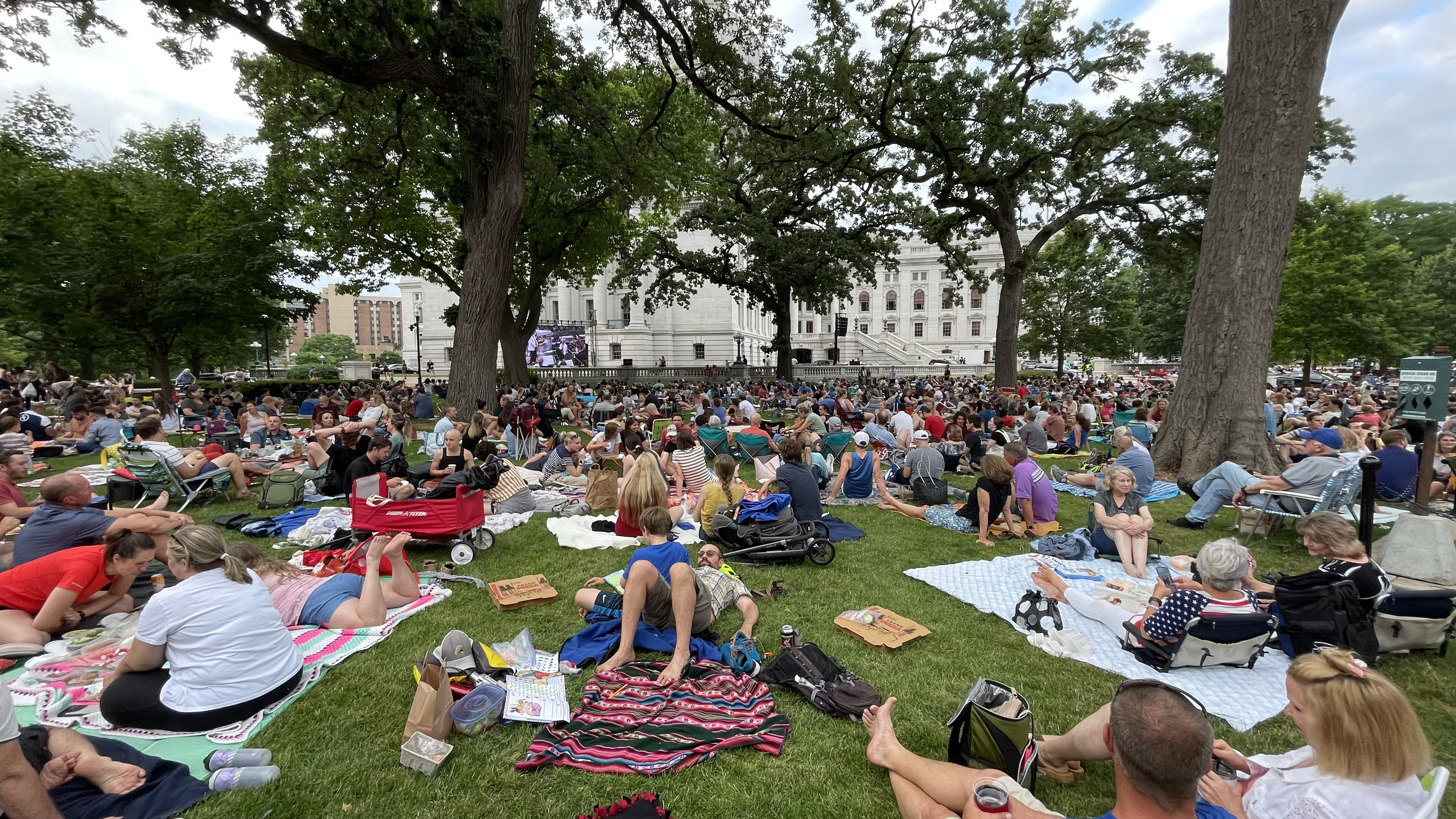

The Wisconsin Chamber Orchestra's Concerts on the Square is a free outdoor concert series held each summer in Madison on the lawn of the Wisconsin State Capitol. The series consists of six concerts on Wednesday evenings with a rain date of Thursday in the case of inclement weather. It has been called "The Biggest Picnic of Summer" and "Quintessential Madison". 2023 marked the 40th season.

Each Wednesday, the street opens at 5 PM and features food, drink, and merchandise vendors.

The series costs approximately $1.1 million to produce and according to an economic impact study performed in 2023, provides over $15 million in economic value to downtown Madison over the course of six weeks in the summer.

Concerts on the Square is funded through corporate and business sponsorships, individual donations, and table reservations. Table reservations can be made by the general public and are tax-deductible contributions.

In 2023, the Wisconsin Chamber Orchestra founded the Volunteer Affiliate program, allowing small local businesses to support the event series through the value of volunteer time. In exchanges, the six selected businesses receive brand recognition leading up to and at the events.

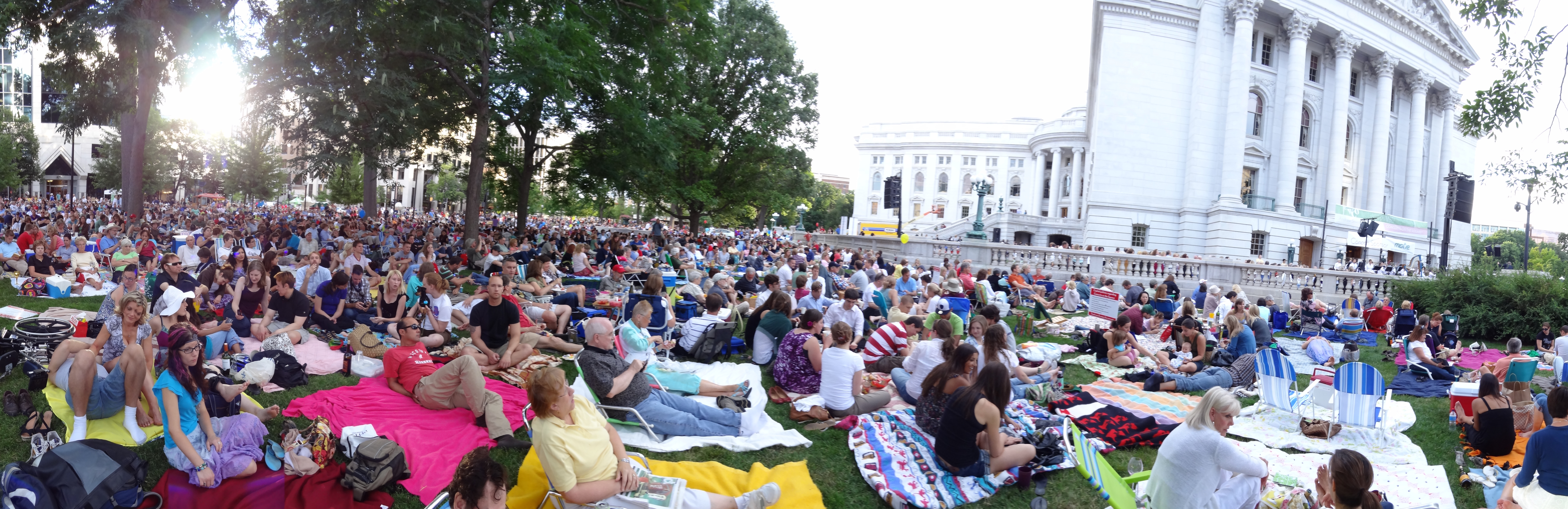
