= Alejandro Idrovo =

Ecuadorian lawyer and politician

René Alejandro Idrovo Rosales (1915-1996) was an Ecuadorian lawyer and politician. He was born on August 17, 1915, in Manglaralto, Guayas.

Idrovo Rosales took part in the May 28, 1944, revolution. He was one of two student deputies in the 1944-1945 Constituent Assembly, representing the Democratic University Union. Idrovo Rosales was a member of the Executive Committee of the Constituent Assembly.

He worked as a teacher at Colegio Vicente Rocafuerte and the University of Guayaquil. He served as editor of the Communist Party organ El Pueblo. He was a member of the Executive Council of the Communist Party. He attended the 1969 International Meeting of Communist and Workers Parties in Moscow. Idrovo Rosales was the vice chairman of the Popular Democratic Union-Broad Left Front (UDP-FADI).

Idrovo Rosales died in Guayaquil on November 21, 1996.
