= Leonardo Sierra Monteiro =

Brazilian actor, engineer and entrepreneur

Leonardo Monteiro
- Born: Leonardo Sierra Monteiro; February 3, 1987 (age 39); São Paulo, Brazil
- Other name: Leonardo Monteiro
- Education: University of São Paulo
- Occupations: Actor; Engineer; Entrepreneur
- Years active: 1997–present
- Known for: Guelé/Chiclê at "Disney CRUJ"

Leonardo Sierra Monteiro (born February 3, 1987) is a Brazilian actor, engineer and entrepreneur.

== Career ==
Monteiro was known nationally as an actor when he was a child, making his debut in Brazilian version of Disney Club in 1997, which later became Disney CRUJ and in 2013 started a startup of price intelligence in physical retail called InfoPrice, that in 2015 part has acquired by B2W an online retail company in Latin America.
