= Battaglia & Miseferi =

Italian comedy duo

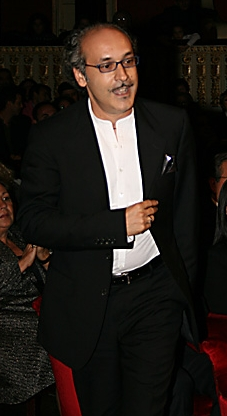
Giacomo Battaglia

Giacomo Battaglia (27 January 1965 – 1 April 2019) and Luigi Miseferi (born 30 April 1966) were an Italian comedy duo.

== Biography ==
Having met casually in Reggio Calabria thanks to a group of friends, they began their artistic partnership in the mid-1980s with a series of successful radio broadcasts on local broadcasters.

In 1990, they participated in the transmission of the networks RAI Stasera mi butto, reserved for young emerging comedians, where they were noticed by Pier Francesco Pingitore, who wrote them for the show "Troppa Trippa" to the Compagnia del Teatro Bagaglino.

They became permanent members of the theater, giving life to comic sketches and imitations including those of Sandro Ciotti and Bruno Vespa.

Fervent fans of Calcio Reggina, the football team of Reggio Calabria, were often guests of the RAI show Quelli che il calcio as guests for the matches of the amaranth formation.

In January 2018, Battaglia was diagnosed with a serious illness but continued to work. On 26 June, at the end of a show with Pippo Franco, he suffered a stroke and was admitted to hospital in Crotone, where he died a year later on 1 April 2019.
