= Víctor J. Merchán =

Víctor Julio Merchán (1909–1980s), known by pseudonyms 'Enrique Andrade', 'Pedro José Abella' and 'Juan García', was a Colombian politician.

Merchán was born 1909 in San Antonio de Jaima, hailing from a peasant family. A brewery worker and union activist at the Bavaria breweries in Bogotá, Merchán became a member of the Revolutionary Socialist Party in 1929 and in 1930 he joined the Colombian Communist Party. He studied at the International Lenin School in Moscow 1930–1934.

In October 1934, he participated in the Third Conference of Communist Parties of South America and the Caribbean. In the same year, Merchán took part in the Preparatory Committee for South and Central America ahead of the Seventh World Congress of the Comintern.

In 1934, back in Colombia, Merchán worked as a union organizer. He led a strike at Bavaria. Merchán settled in Viotá, a town in Cundinamarca Department.

In Viota, he went on to building an agrarian mass movement in the area, organizing some 80-100 cells and founding different union organizations. He organized coffee plantation workers to seize unused lands of larger estates. In 1935 Merchán was elected as an alternate member of the Viotá municipal council. Soon after his arrival, he was arrested after a coffee plantation workers strike and spent a year in jail. In 1936, after his release from prison, the Communist Party leadership sent Merchán back to the Soviet Union for studies and rest.

In 1942, he became a National Committee member of the National Peasants' and Indian Federation. In 1944, he was elected to the Cundinamarca Department Assembly. By the mid-1940s, Merchán had built peasants' leagues in Tierradentro and helped build a Propaganda Committee to defend indigenous interests in the area. He was arrested on April 12, along with other Communist Party leaders, following the Bogotazo events.

In the Viotá area, Merchán built up a communist-dominated enclave during La Violencia. Merchán's enclave around Viotá, spanning some five square miles, and another communist-dominated area in nearby Sumapaz became popularly known as the 'Republic of Tequendama'. Merchán served as the secretary of the Tequendama regional committee of the Communist Party. In 1958, Merchán became a Central Committee member of the Communist Party. As of the early 1960s, Merchán remained the key leader in the Viotá area and managed a party cadre school there.

As of the 1970s, Merchán was the key agrarian leader of the Communist Party, leading the ANUC.
