= Giovanni Cavagna =

Italian physiologist (1934–2025)

- Born: 30 May 1934; Milan, Kingdom of Italy
- Died: 16 January 2025 (aged 90); Milan, Italy
- Education: University of Milan (MD) - 1959
- Known for: Biomechanics of terrestrial locomotion
- Awards: Feltrinelli Prize for Medicine (2000); Honorary Medical Degree from Université Catholique de Louvain (1994)
- Scientific career
- Fields: Physiology
- Workplaces: University of Milan

Giovanni Cavagna (30 May 1934 – 16 January 2025) was an Italian physiologist and Emeritus Professor of Human Physiology at the University of Milan. His research focuses on muscle physiology, biomechanical principles of terrestrial locomotion in humans and other animals, from walking to running. He also studied specialized locomotion styles in Luo and Kikuyu women carrying heavy loads on their head with low metabolic cost, as well as locomotion during parabolic flight simulating Martian gravity. The New Scientist and the Discover magazine covered his discoveries about the mechanisms of imperfect pendular exchange between gravitational potential energy and kinetic energy of the center of body mass. The New York Times reported about his work on backward running, which can potentially improve forward running by allowing greater and safer training. For his work, he received an Honorary Medical Degree from the Université Catholique de Louvain in 1994 and the Feltrinelli Prize for Medicine from the Accademia dei Lincei in 2000. He has published several widely cited papers and the book “Fundamentals of human physiology”.

Cavagna died on 16 January 2025, at the age of 90.

== Selected publications ==
- Cavagna G, Dusman B, Margaria R (1968). "Positive work done by a previously stretched muscle". Journal of Applied Physiology. 24 (1): 21–32. doi:10.1152/jappl.1968.24.1.21. PMID 5635766.
- Cavagna GA, Heglund NC, Taylor CR (1977). "Mechanical work in terrestrial locomotion: two basic mechanisms for minimizing energy expenditure". American Journal of Physiology. 233 (5): R243-261. doi:10.1152/ajpregu.1977.233.5.R243. PMID 411381.
- Cavagna GA, Thys H, Zamboni A (1976). "The sources of external work in level walking and running". The Journal of Physiology. 262 (3): 639–57. doi:10.1113/jphysiol.1976.sp011613. PMC 1307665. PMID 1011078.
- Maloiy GM, Heglund NC, Prager LM, Cavagna GA, Taylor CR (1986). "Energetic cost of carrying loads: have African women discovered an economic way?". Nature. 319 (6055): 668–669. doi:10.1038/319668a0. PMID 3951538.
- Cavagna GA, Willems PA, Heglund NC (1998). "Walking on mars". Nature. 393 (6686): 636. doi:10.1038/31374. PMID 9641676.
- Cavagna GA, Legramandi MA, La Torre A (2011). "Running Backwards: Soft Landing-Hard Takeoff, a Less Efficient Rebound". Proceedings of the Royal Society B: Biological Sciences. 278 (1704): 339–346. doi:10.1098/rspb.2010.1212. PMC 3013407. PMID 20719774.
