= Revionics =

American software company

Revionics Inc
- Type: Private
- Founded: 2002; 24 years ago in Roseville, CA
- Headquarters: Roseville
- Parent: Aptos, LLC
- Website: https://revionics.com/

Revionics (Revionics, Inc.) is an American software company that develops lifecycle price optimization software for retailers. The software is marketed via the software as a service (SaaS) model. The company was acquired in 2020 by Aptos.

== History ==
Revionics was founded in 2002 in Roseville, California. The company acquired Retail Optimization in July 2012, and acquired SkuLoop in November 2012. It was ranked 79th in Deloitte's 2012 Technology Fast 500 rankings.

In September 2013, the company raised $11.2 million in venture financing. In October 2013, Revionics moved its headquarters from Roseville to Austin, Texas.

In December 2014, the company announced an investment from Goldman Sachs’ private capital Investing group, reported at $30 million. In December 2015, it announced the acquisition of Marketyze, based in Tel Aviv.

In August 2020, it was acquired by Aptos, an Atlanta-based retail technology solutions company.
