= Dirotta su Cuba =

- Origin: Florence, Italy
- Genres: Funk, pop jazz
- Years active: 1989–present

Dirotta su Cuba is an Italian funk-pop-jazz group formed in the late 1980s in Florence. They are also referred to as I Dirotta su Cuba.

== History ==
The band was founded in 1989 by Rossano Gentili and Stefano De Donato, joined in 1990 by the singer Simona Bencini. Their record debut happened in 1994, with the single "Gelosia" followed by their debut album Dirotta su Cuba. The group entered the main competition at the 1997 Sanremo Music Festival, with the song "È andata così" for which they were accompanied by the Belgian jazz musician Toots Thielemans. In 2000 De Donato left the band, followed two years later by Simona Bencini, replaced by the vocalist Marquica. After some sporadic appearances, the original line-up officially reunited in 2012.

== Discography ==
Albums

- 1994 - Dirotta su Cuba
- 1996 - Nonostante tutto...
- 1997 - andata così
- 2000 - Dentro ad ogni attimo
- 2002 - Fly
- 2005 - Jaz
