= Gaetano Mansi =

Italian photographer

- Born: Gaetano Mansi; 20 July 1956 (age 70); Ravello, Campania, Italy
- Occupation: Photographer
- Years active: 1976–present

Gaetano Mansi (July 20, 1956) is an Italian fashion and portrait photographer.

== Career ==
He started his career in Salerno, working as an assistant for Studio Segno, advertising agency founded by Pino Grimaldi. In the Seventies his main professional field was reportage. He is coauthor of Missus est Angelus, a photographic essay on John Paul II. The magazine Il Tempo Illustrato publishes his images of Rino Mele's avant-garde theater. In 1978 he contributes to the exhibit "Autodocumentazione". He gets a degree in Art History with a thesis on the history of fashion photography.

In 1980 he contributed to the documentation of the earthquake in Irpinia (November 23, 1980) flying over the disaster area on a helicopter. His reportages are published by the weekly magazine Epoca as well as many international periodicals. He takes part in the recognition of the historical buildings in Campania promoted by the Department of Restoration of Naples University. His works are also published by british Condé Nast House&Garden. With Alessandro Pinto he publishes the books Cilento and La Costa dei Miti.

In the Nineties he starts to work for Il Venerdì di Repubblica with portraits and reportages: among the others a shooting on Eva Herzigova in the Bahamas. While in Jerusalem for Il Venerdì he is assaulted and wounded by a terrorist. He is one of the very few surviving Westerners in the Intifada. He is coauthor of the book on the history of fashion photography La Fotografia di Moda tra Immagine e Rappresentazione.

From the year 2000 on he focuses exclusively on fashion, shooting in Italy and abroad for advertising campaigns and fashion magazines.

He contributed to the volume Corso di Fotografia and prints the books 40 Volte Bianca, PassingThrough, CentoAsaGrana & Pixels. His exhibition "Grana & Pixels" takes places in Rome in 2017. It consists of 300 billboards posted all over the city of Rome linked to an app that geolocalizes every one of them.

From 2018 he is a contributor for Diva e Donna magazine, with Daniela Rosa Cattaneo as fashion director.

== Style ==
Gaetano Mansi's style has been influenced by the different genres he experimented through the years. He prefers to shoot on location, often employing mixed light, natural and artificial. His images are almost always dynamic, never posing, with a particular attention to lighting and composition.

== Books ==
- Missus est Angelus, Il Laboratorio Edizioni, 1978, A day with Pope John Paul II
- Cilento, Comunità Montana Gelbison e Cervati, 1981
- Oltre il Terremoto, Assessorato Pubblica Istruzione e Beni Culturali, 1982, Pictures from Irpinia Earthquake
- La Costa dei Miti, Comunità Montana Lambro Mingardo, 1982
- Styles of living, the best of Casa Vogue, Rizzoli, New York, 1985
- La fotografia di moda tra immagine e rappresentazione, EleaPress, 1992, A short history of fashion photography
- Corso Di Fotografia, National Geographic/Editoriale La Repubblica, 2000, Photography techniques
- 40 Volte Bianca, Marte Editrice, 2008
- Passing Through, Marte Editrice, 2013
- CentoAsa, Marte Editrice, 2017
- Grana & Pixels, Marte Editrice, 2017
- Faces and Souls, Caratteri, 2021
- 40 Volte Bianca, Caratteri-Made in Italy, 2022
- 54x70, Caratteri, 2022
- Volti e Anime, Marte Editrice, 2022
- Zoe Factory, la fabbrica della bellezza, Caratteri, 2024
- Melluso, settanta anni di immagini iconiche, Caratteri-Made in Italy, 2024
- Living Canvas, , Tono Continuo Edizioni, 2025

== Publications ==
- Casa Vogue
  - 1982 : November
  - 1983 : October, November
  - 1984 : July–August, November
  - 1986 : August, November
  - 1987 : May
  - 1988 : January
  - 1990 : November
  - 1991 : May
- Vogue Italia
  - 1986 : December
  - 1987 : December
  - 1988 : September, December
  - 1989 : January, March, September, December
  - 1990 : March
  - 1991 : May
- Vogue Gioiello
  - 1984 : November
- Vogue America
  - 1985 : April
- House&Garden
  - 1985 : May
  - 1986 : January
- Casa Vogue Antiques
  - 1989 : May
  - 1991 : January
- Vogue Uomo Mare
  - 1991 : January
- L’Uomo Vogue
  - 1993 : July
- Il Venerdì
  - 1992 : N.232,
  - 1996 : N.422, 426, 457
  - 1998 : N.622
- Mondo Sposa
  - 1994 : September
  - 1995 : September
- First Class Japan
  - 1994 : March
- Linea Intima
  - 1995 : April
- Linea Sposi
  - 1996 : January
- Sposarsi
  - 1996 : January
- Where Miami
  - 2000 : March
- Zoom
  - 2002 : January
- Stilish Magazine Russia
  - 2005 : April
- FHM Spagna
  - 2006 : April
- Vintage Kazakistan
  - 2014 : N.71
  - 2014 : N.77
- Fotografare
  - 2016 : September

== Exhibitions ==
- 1978 : Autodocumentazione, retrospective exhibition, Sant’Apollonia Church, Salerno, Italy.
- 2015 : Silent print, Well Gallery, London College of Communication, London, United Kingdom.
- 2017 : Grana & Pixels, widespread exhibition, Roma, Italy.
- 2022 : 54x70, Teatro Antonio Ghirelli, Salerno, Italy
- 2022 : Volti e Anime, Treviso, Italy.
