= Guido Cavagna =

Swiss politician

Guido Cavagna (born 1917) was a Swiss politician. Cavagna grew up in a strongly Catholic peasant family in Ticino. Cavagna became a member of the Communist Party of Switzerland. He was a founding member of the Swiss Party of Labour.

Cavagna was part of the triumvirate (along with Gigi Martinoni and Pietro Monetti) that led the Ticino branch of the Swiss Party of Labour between 1944 and 1975. Cavagna joined the Central Committee of the Swiss Party of Labour in the 1950s. He represented the party at the 10th anniversary of the People's Republic of China in Beijing, 1959. Between 1974 and 1978 he was a member of the Politburo of the party.

Cavagna was a member of the municipal council of Minusio 1944–1952, and then a member of the Minusio executive council for another 28 years. He was a deputy in the Grand Council of Ticino 1967-1971 and 1975–1979.
