= Hassan Qraytim =

Lebanese politician

Hassan Qraytim (Arabic: حسن قريطم; 1919 – 21 March 1985 in Beirut) was a Lebanese politician. As of 1960 he was the general secretary of the Lebanese Communist Party. In that year, he participated in the International Meeting of Communist and Workers Parties.

== Personal life ==
He married Salma Al-Bunni and had three children.
