= Locman =

Wristwatch company

Locman Italy
- Company type: Joint-stock company
- Founded: 1986; 40 years ago in Marina di Campo, Tuscany, Italy
- Key people: Marco Mantovani
- Products: Watches
- Website: www.locman.it

Locman Italy, is an Italian wristwatch and leather accessories manufacturing company. The name derives from the founding members’ initials, Locci and Mantovani. The company was founded on the Island of Elba in 1986 in the Tuscan archipelago. In 2006 Locman also founded SIO (the Italian School of Watchmaking) whose headquarters are in Marina di Campo. Locman watches are made of materials, such as titanium, carbon fiber and aluminum.

== History ==
The founder of the company, Maxi, was born on the Tuscan island but spent his childhood and studied in Milan where his father was born and had a leather company. Inspired by this environment, in 1985 he began designing leather goods, first and foremost a leather strap. Together with his friend and partner Fulvio Locci, Marco went to Basel to introduce his strap to the companies taking part in the watchmaking fair.

The brand was founded in 1996 by Mantovani, the same year he decided to return to the island of Elba. Even today, the design and production of Locman watches is still carried out entirely on the island.

By 2020, the Locman company had expanded its market, combining the Locman signature with other products, such as bags and glasses, thanks to the purchase of the Magia Eyewear group in 2016. This debut was promoted by the Italian singer Vasco Rossi.

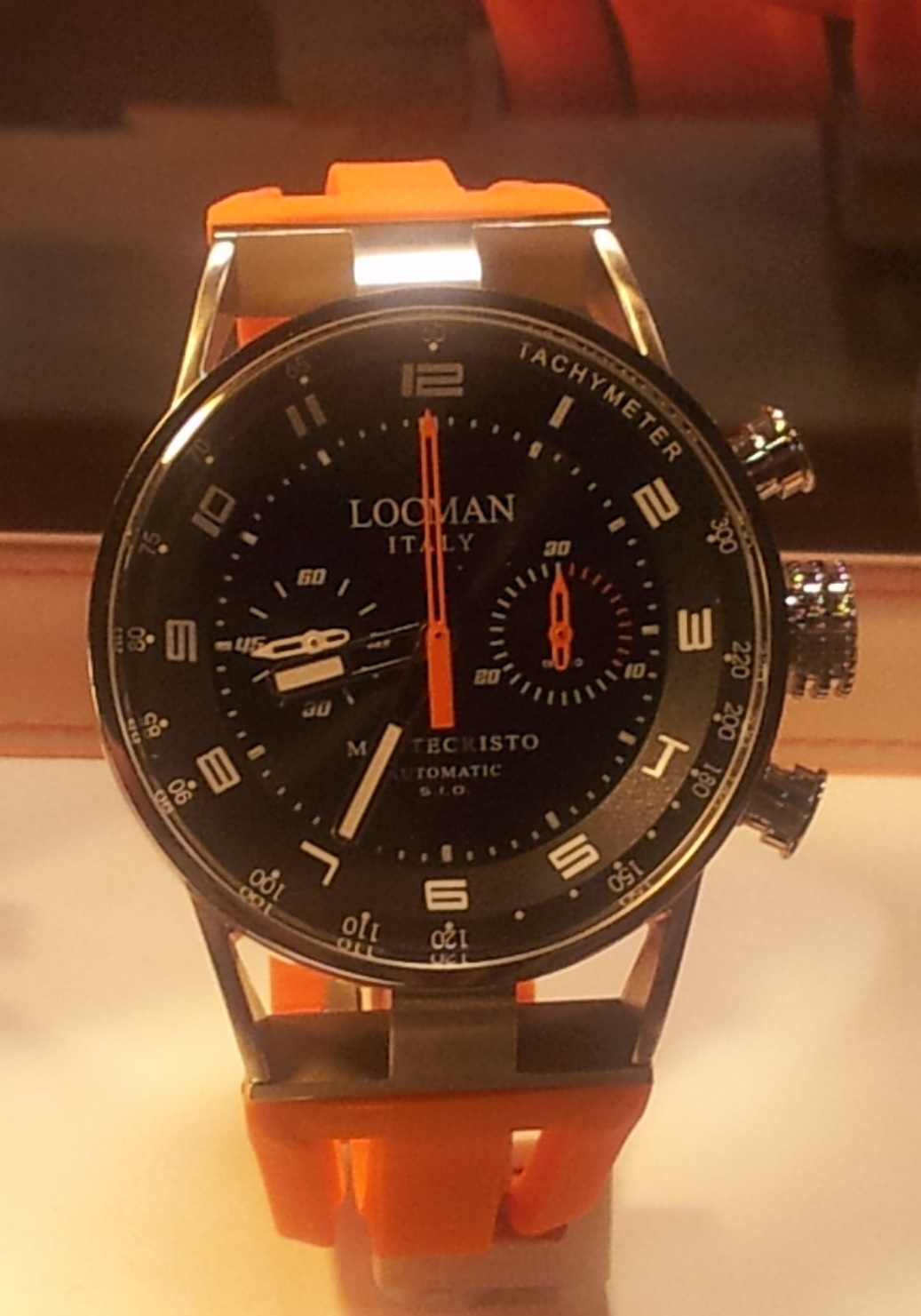
Montecristo Automatic Chronograph with S.I.O. movement

== Production ==
In the early years, Mantovani and Locci designed and produced models for other brands in the Marina di Campo and Milan offices. Starting in the nineties, the two partners decided to create their own brand models, which gained recognition.

In cooperation with the armed forces, models were produced for the Navy and the Air Force. In 2007 on the occasion of the release of the new Fiat 500 on the market, a limited series of 500 watches inspired by this car was produced. Today the company has a turnover of more than 20 million euros, 70 employees and a distribution network in Europe, the United States, the Middle East and Japan. But, in its early years, the company was not well known to the watchmaking market until Hollywood actors like Sharon Stone and Jennifer Lopez along with sport stars like David Beckham started wearing Locmans and brought the company to become well known in the watchmaking field.
