= Eduardo De Crescenzo =

Italian singer-songwriter

- Born: 8 February 1951 (age 75); Naples, Italy
- Occupations: Singer-songwriter; multi-instrumentalist

Eduardo De Crescenzo (born 8 February 1951) is an Italian singer-songwriter and multi-instrumentalist, best known for the songs "Ancora" and "E la musica va".

== Background ==
Born in Naples, De Crescenzo approached music at very young age, as he began playing the accordion at 3 and made his first public exhibition at 5, in Teatro Argentina, Rome.

At 16 he founded a beat group, "Eduardino e i Casanova", with which he recorded the first 45rpm in 1967, "Hai detto no!". After studying classical music and law at the university, in the late seventies De Crescenzo signed a contract with Dischi Ricordi, with whom he published his first single as soloist, "La solitudine" (1978). His career was launched by the song "Ancora", a romantic ballad that he presented at the 1981 Sanremo Music Festival, winning the Critics Award; the song obtained an extraordinary success, selling several millions of copies and being covered by artists such as Mina, Anna Oxa, Ornella Vanoni and Thelma Houston (with the title "I'm Losing").

Despite that large success, in the following years De Crescenzo pursued different routes, exploring musical contaminations between Italian classical melodies, soul, rhythm and blues and folk; he took part at four more editions of the Sanremo Festival, in 1985 ("Via con me"), 1987 ("L'odore del mare"), 1989 ("Come mi vuoi") and in 1991 ("E la musica va"). The song "E la musica va" was covered by Phil Manzanera with the title "The beat goes on". After the 1993 album Danza, danza De Crescenzo devoted himself mainly to the live concerts and charity projects. In 2012, after a four-year hiatus, he returned to live music with the "Essenze Jazz" Tour in which he reinterprets an important part of his repertoire in a jazz style.

== Discography ==
=== Studio albums ===
- 1981 – Ancora
- 1982 – Amico che voli
- 1983 – Decrescenzo
- 1985 – Dove c'è il mare
- 1987 – Nudi
- 1989 – C'è il sole
- 1991 – Cante jondo
- 1993 – Danza danza
- 2002 – La vita è un'altra
- 2013 – Essenze Jazz

=== Live albums ===
- 1995 – Live
- 2006 – Le mani

=== Compilation albums ===
- 1996 – All The Best (1981–1991)
- 1998 – 80 minuti insieme (1981–1993)
- 2007 – Le più belle (1978–1991)
- 2011 – I miei successi (1978–1991)
