= Angela Cavagna =

Italian singer

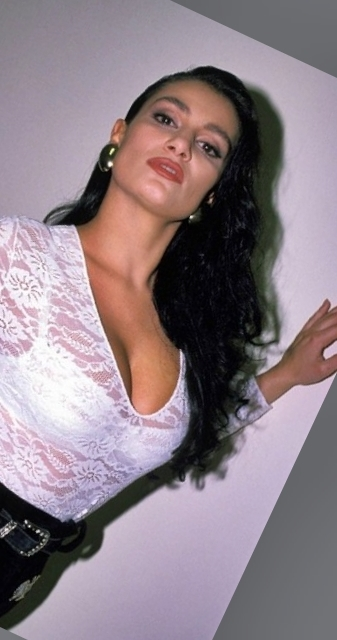
- Born: 6 June 1966 (age 60); Genoa, Italy
- Occupations: Showgirl, model, television personality
- Years active: 1987 – present
- Spouse: Orlando Portento 2005–2009
- Website: angela-cavagna.it

Angela Cavagna (born 6 June 1966) is an Italian showgirl, model, and television personality.

She became known to the general public at the turn of the 1980s and 1990s, with her participation in several programs such as Trisitors and Striscia la notizia, in which she dressed the skimpy role of a sexy nurse being particularly appreciated for her very prosperous breasts.In those years she also recorded a record entitled Io vi curo, released by the Five Record label even outside Italy, achieving success especially in Spain. Her first LP, titled Sex is Movin', reached the top of the charts in Spain, the Netherlands and Germany. She was also portrayed on the covers of men's magazines, such as Playboy.

In the following years, following also the publication of a book collecting some letters sent to her by admirers, she participated in several TV programs such as Guide to the Championship and Unomattina, and in a film, until her participation in 2006 in the third edition of the reality show La fattoria (terza edizione).

== Biography ==
Born in Genoa on June 6, 1966, to a Lombardy father, Carlo, and a Sardinia mother, Maria Josè. She has three brothers, Pierluigi, Stefano and Giancarlo.

Granddaughter of painter Federico Sirigu, as a teenager she Classical ballet at La Scala in Milan in 1980, then moved to Reggio Emilia in 1981 to attend the school of Liliana Cosi and Marinel Stefanescu. The following year she continued her dance courses at the academy in Rome, and in 1983 she returned to Milan to attend Brian & Garrison's classes. On the advice of the same teachers she went abroad until graduating from the Grace Kelly National Academy directed by Marika Bezobrazova in Monte Carlo. She won a scholarship to Doreen Bird College in London and concurrently released her first character dance instructional video, the result of a collaboration with Russian master Mikhail Berkut.

In 1986 he made his theatrical debut, at the "Giardino degli Aranci" in Rome, with the opera Varietà perché sei morto! directed by Ennio Coltorti with the Compagnia TuttaRoma; the stage program was curated by Teresa Gatta. In 1988 she participated in the Italian selections of Miss World.

She made her show business debut as a chorister and dancer for Sabrina Salerno's live performances, while she made her television debut in 1987 on Domani si gioca with Gianni Minà and in 1989 with the program Trisitors, hosted by the group Trettré. She found true popularity by participating in the famous pre-evening program Striscia la notizia, filling in as "sexy nurse" for actress Sonia Grey until January 1992 Some of the letters she received were collected in a book, titled You are more beautiful than my goat. One Hundred Letters to Angela Cavagna and published by Tullio Pironti.

In 1990 he worked in the Iberian Peninsula with appearances in the various TV shows hosted by ventriloquist José Luis Moreno on Telecinco and TVE. He also began the various Tours with live performances on the peninsula. In 1991, her role in Antonio Ricci's evening program aroused several controversies; in fact, there were protests from doctors and nurses who considered the image given by the showgirl during the program and which emphasized her prosperity and sensuality, detrimental - in their opinion - to the image of the category. In the same year, a media fight between Cavagna, supported by her manager and then-husband Orlando Portento, and Sabrina Salerno, a singer with whom she had collaborated in her early days, also caused a stir. The former accused Salerno of having undergone cosmetic surgery to increase the size of her breasts and lips; the clash was widely reported in the media and ended up in the courtroom, where the singer sought damages claiming the authenticity of her breasts and lips.

Following her experience on Striscia la notizia, in June 1992 she also took on the role of valet on the summer vacation TG, hosted by the comedy duo Gigi and Andrea. In 1992 she recorded a record, released first in the rest of Europe and then in Italy entitled Io vi curo and containing nine songs sung in Spanish language and English language.

She often posed in men-only magazines. A number of covers were also dedicated to her, in Italy, such as with Playboy (September 1989, March 1992), Excelsior (periodico)(June 1991, August and January 1992, July 1994), Penthouse (magazine) (July 1995) or Playmen (August 1994, June 1996), and abroad (e.g., the cover of the Dutch edition of Playboy in September 1990). This caused a particular stir because Cavagna had repeatedly defended her virginity, which she would eventually lose at age 29 in 1996, as reported by several newspapers.

== Filmography ==
=== Cinema ===
- Chiavi in mano, director Mariano Laurenti – 1996

=== Television ===
- Trisitors (1988)
- Striscia la notizia (1990–1992)
- Il TG delle vacanze (1991)
- Detto tra noi (1993–1994)
- Guida al campionato (1995–1996)
- Unomattina (2002)
- La Fattoria 3 (2006)
