= Ancora (Eduardo de Crescenzo album) =

Studio album by Eduardo de Crescenzo
- Released: 1981
- Genre: Pop music
- Length: 35:31
- Label: Dischi Ricordi, SMRL 6274

Eduardo de Crescenzo chronology
Ancora (1981)	Amico che voli (1983)

Ancora is the 1981 debut LP of Italian singer Eduardo De Crescenzo following his triumph with the title song "Ancora" at the Festival di Sanremo. All the tracks are compositions with lyrics by Franco Migliacci and music by Claudio Mattone, which are co-published by Jubal/Easy Records Italian which also served as the album's production company. The album was recorded at "Quattro 1" studios in Rome with the automatic mixer MCI JH-542 by sound engineer Luciano Torani, while the master was edited by Pietro Mannucci.

== Track listing ==
1. Al piano bar di Susy – 4:30 (testo: Franco Migliacci – musica: Claudio Mattone)
2. Quando l'amore se ne va – 3:59 (testo: Franco Migliacci – musica: Claudio Mattone)
3. Alle sei di sera – 3:15 (testo: Franco Migliacci – musica: Claudio Mattone)
4. Uomini semplici – 3:36 (testo: Franco Migliacci – musica: Claudio Mattone)
5. Doppia vita – 3:24 (testo: Franco Migliacci – musica: Claudio Mattone)
6. Ancora – 3:27 (testo: Franco Migliacci – musica: Claudio Mattone)
7. Il treno – 3:35 (testo: Franco Migliacci – musica: Claudio Mattone)
8. Chitarra mia – 4:12 (testo: Claudio Mattone e Franco Migliacci – musica: Claudio Mattone)
9. Padre – 4:07 (testo: Franco Migliacci – musica: Claudio Mattone e Piero Pintucci)
10. Uomini semplici ([1]) – 1:20 (testo: Franco Migliacci – musica: Claudio Mattone)
