= Wisconsin Chamber Orchestra =

American chamber orchestra

- Chamber orchestra
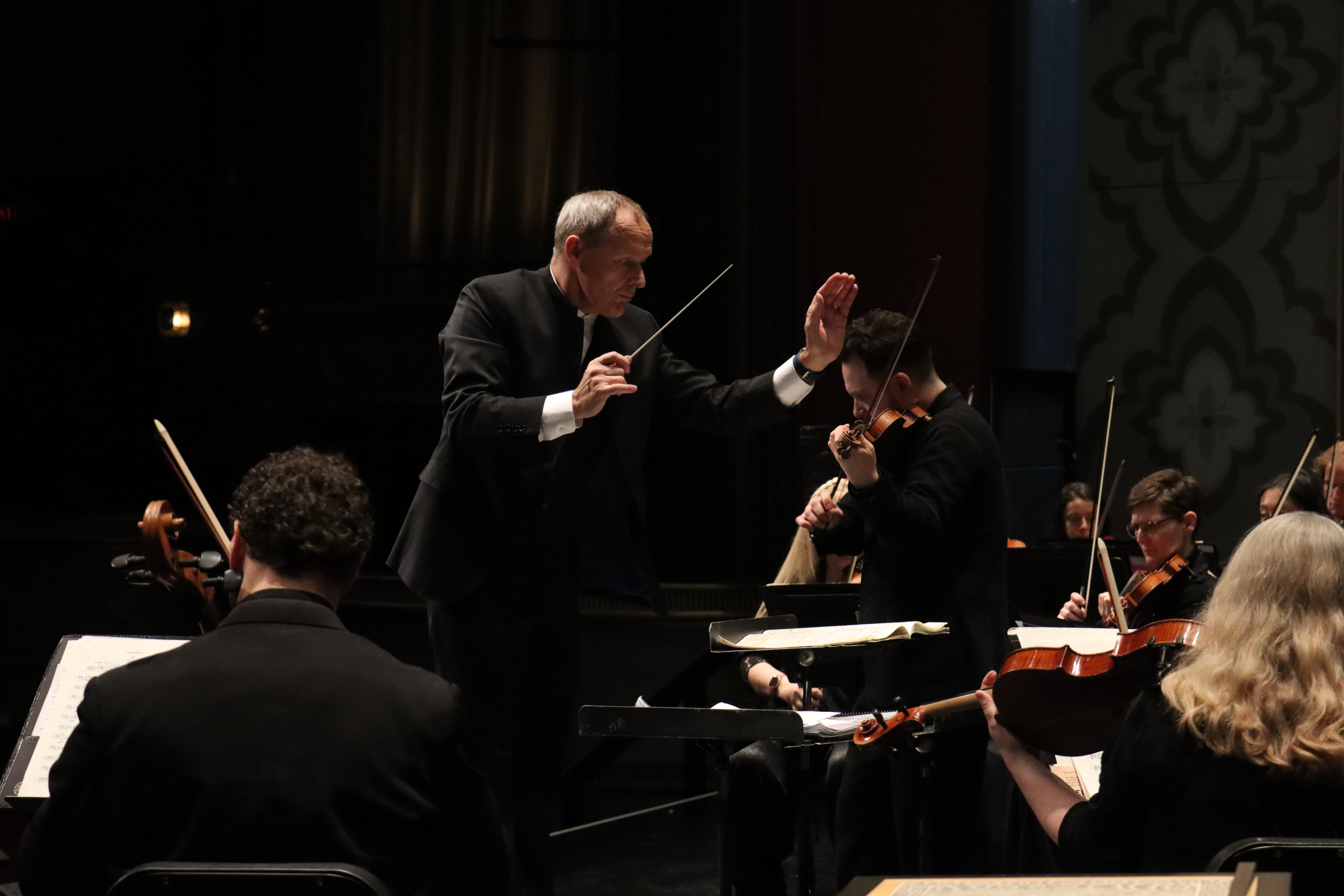
- Andrew Sewell leads the WCO in January 2025
- Founded: 1960
- Location: Madison, Wisconsin
- Concert hall: Overture Center for the Arts
- Principal conductor: Andrew Sewell
- Website: wcoconcerts.org

The Wisconsin Chamber Orchestra (WCO) is an American chamber orchestra based in Madison, Wisconsin. The WCO and the Madison Symphony Orchestra are the city's two professional orchestras.

The WCO holds 29 concerts each year, including five concerts in their Masterworks series, youth concerts, holiday concerts, and six free-to-public outdoor Concerts on the Square held on the grounds of the Wisconsin State Capitol.

== History ==
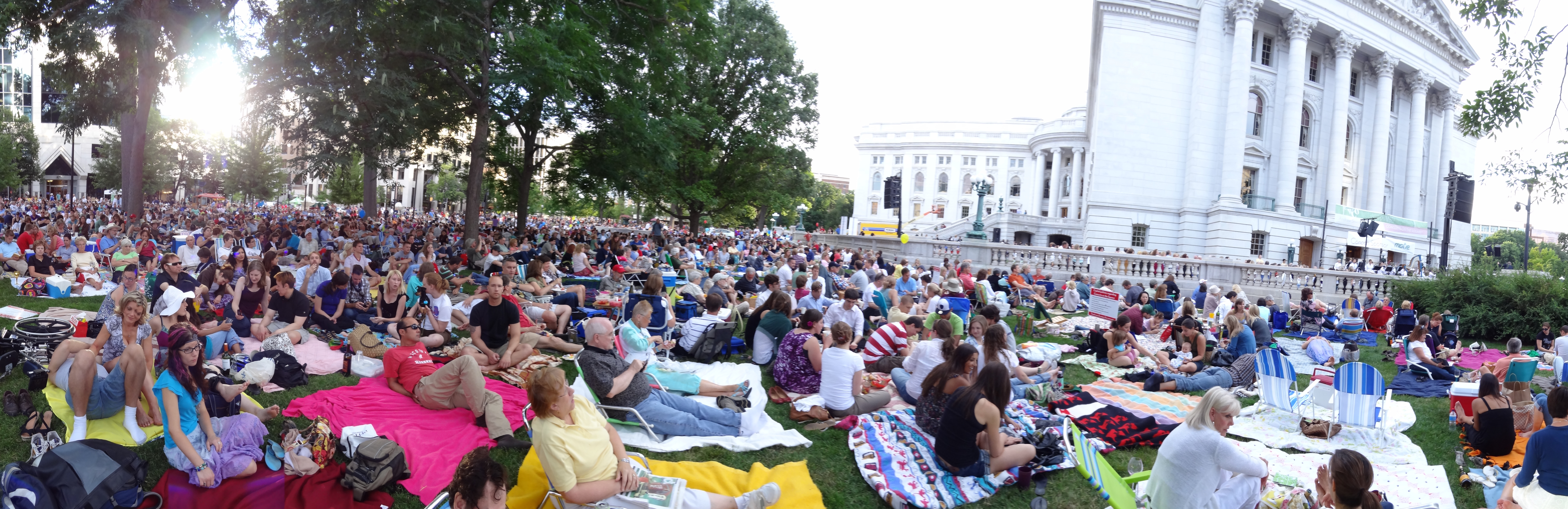
Panorama of Concerts on the Square

It was founded in 1960 by Gordon B. Wright. Its current conductor, Andrew Sewell, began his tenure with the orchestra in 2000.

The orchestra was originally established as the Madison Summer Symphony. In 1969, David Lewis Crosby become the orchestra's director after the Wright's departure. Under Crosby's direction, the Madison Summer Symphony changed its name to the Wisconsin Chamber Orchestra. Crosby inaugurated the popular Concerts on the Square concert series in 1984 and remained the orchestra's conductor until his death in 1998. Andrew Sewell became the orchestra's music director in 2000, a position he has held since.
