= Youma Diakite =

Malian model, actress, television personality and showgirl

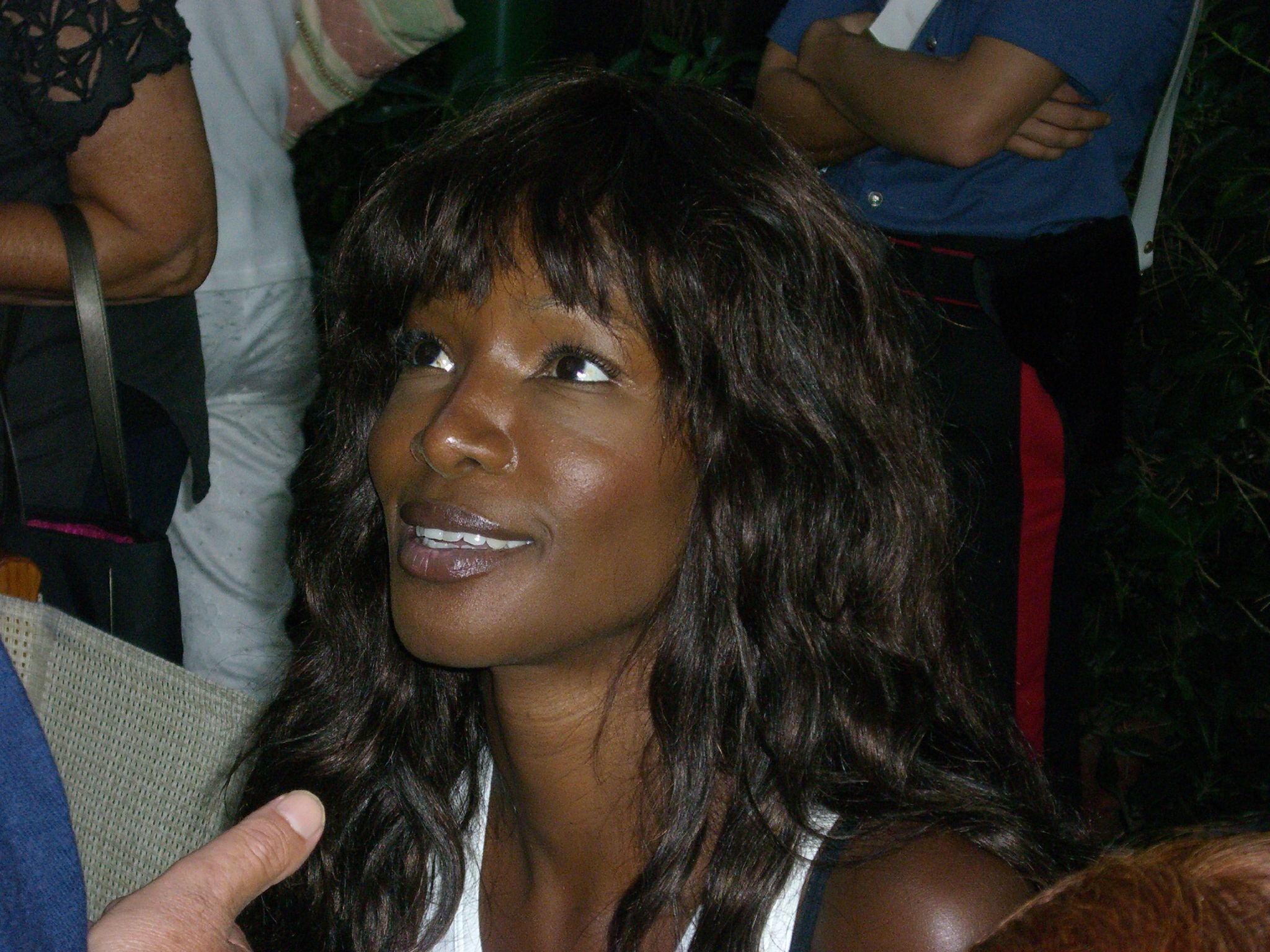
- Born: 1 May 1971 (age 54); Mali
- Occupations: Model, actress, television personality and showgirl

Youma Diakite (born 1 May 1971), also known simply as Youma, is a Malian model, actress, television personality and showgirl, mainly active in Italy. She is internationally known also as "the other Naomi" because of a resemblance to Naomi Campbell.

== Biography ==
Born in Mali and raised in Paris, Diakite became worldwide known at 18 years old when she was chosen by Benetton Group as spokesmodel for an advertising campaign. Moved to Italy in 1998, Diakite was a runway model for notable stylists including Armani, Versace and Dolce & Gabbana. Diakite appeared in several television variety shows. She was also a contestant in the reality-talent show Ballando con le Stelle (Italian version of Dancing with the Stars) aired by Rai Uno and also in the reality-game show L'isola dei famosi (Italian version of Celebrity Survivor) aired by Canale 5. Diakite also appeared in John Wick: Chapter 2, an action film directed by Chad Stahelski in 2017. Diakite is also an international political activist against racism.

== Filmography ==
Films
Year	Title	Role	Notes
2001	E adesso sesso	Brigitte	
2002	Casomai	Youma	
2004	Ocean's Twelve	Toulour Woman #1	Cameo appearance
2005	Fratella e sorello	Nonò	
2007	Oliviero Rising	Karol	
2016	Teen Star Academy	Brenda	
2017	John Wick: Chapter 2	Lucia	
