= Grande Fratello VIP season 7 =

Grande Fratello VIP
- Season 7
- Presented by: Alfonso Signorini
- No. of days: 197
- No. of housemates: 35
- Winner: Nikita Pelizon
- Runner-up: Oriana Marzoli
- No. of episodes: 45

Release
- Original network: Canale 5
- Original release: September 19, 2022 – April 3, 2023

Season chronology
- ← Previous; Season 6 Next → Season 8

Grande Fratello VIP 7 (also known by the acronym GFVIP7) is the seventh celebrity season of the Italian reality television franchise Grande Fratello, and was launched on September 19, 2022, on Canale 5.

Alfonso Signorini returned as the host of the main show, businesswoman Sonia Bruganelli (replaced during New Eve vacation by Soleil Sorge and Pierpaolo Pretelli only in the 25th and 26th live show) returned as opinionist and was joined by singer Orietta Berti (that replaced the opinionist of the previous season Adriana Volpe).

For the first time in Grande Fratello VIP history, it was announced that most of the housemates would be revealed directly during the first live show, with only a few exceptions.

The show was originally scheduled to last 99 days, with the finale on 26 December 2022. However, due to satisfactory ratings, the show was extended by over three months, making it the longest celebrity season and Grande Fratello season of the show at 197 days long and with the finale on 3 April 2023.

== Housemates ==
The age of the housemates refers to the time of entry into the house.

| Housemates | Age | Birthplace | Famous for... | Day entered | Day exited | Status |
|---|---|---|---|---|---|---|
| Nikita Pelizon | 28 | Trieste | Model and influencer | 1 | 197 | Winner |
| Oriana Marzoli | 30 | Caracas, Venezuela | Influencer and reality TV personality | 46 | 197 | Runner-up |
| Alberto De Pisis | 32 | Milan | Influencer | 1 | 197 | 3rd Place |
| Sofia Giaele De Donà | 23 | Conegliano | Model, influencer and businesswoman | 4 | 197 | 4th Place |
| Edoardo Tavassi | 38 | Rome | Video-maker, voice actor and brother of Guendalina Tavassi | 46 | 197 | 5th Place |
| Micol Incorvaia | 29 | Pordenone | Influencer and sister of Clizia Incorvaia | 46 | 197 | 6th Place |
| Milena Miconi | 50 | Rome | TV personality, actress and former model | 85 | 197 | 25th Evicted |
| Luca Onestini | 29 | Castel San Pietro Terme | Model, TV personality, Grande Fratello VIP season 2 housemate | 46 | 190 | 24th Evicted |
| Andrea Maestrelli | 24 | Empoli | Footballer | 92 | 176 | 21st Evicted |
| Andrea Maestrelli | 24 | Empoli | Footballer | 176 | 190 | 23rd Evicted |
| Antonella Fiordelisi | 24 | Salerno | Model and influencer | 1 | 183 | 22nd Evicted |
| Daniele Dal Moro | 32 | Verona | Businessman, model, Grande Fratello season 16 housemate | 4 | 180 | Ejected |
| Davide Donadei | 27 | Parabita | Restaurateur and TV personality | 90 | 172 | 20th Evicted |
| Edoardo Donnamaria | 29 | Rome | Radio host, blogger and TV personality | 4 | 172 | Ejected |
| Sarah Altobello | 34 | Modugno | Model and TV personality | 46 | 155 | 16th Evicted |
| Sarah Altobello | 34 | Modugno | Model and TV personality | 155 | 165 | 19th Evicted |
| Nicole Murgia | 29 | Rome | Actress | 90 | 162 | 18th Evicted |
| Antonino Spinalbese | 27 | Torre del Greco | Hairstylist and former partner of Belen Rodriguez | 1 | 158 | 17th Evicted |
| Attilio Romita | 69 | Bari | Journalist and TV presenter | 1 | 148 | 15th Evicted |
| George Ciupilan | 20 | Huși, Romania | Influencer and TV personality | 1 | 134 | 14th Evicted |
| Wilma Goich | 76 | Cairo Montenotte | Singer and TV personality | 4 | 106 | 11th Evicted |
| Wilma Goich | 76 | Cairo Montenotte | Singer and TV personality | 106 | 127 | 13th Evicted |
| Dana Saber | 29 | Morocco | Model | 92 | 120 | 12th Evicted |
| Patrizia Rossetti | 63 | Montaione | Radio host, actress, singer and TV presenter | 1 | 106 | Walked |
| Luca Salatino | 30 | Rome | Chef and TV personality | 1 | 99 | Walked |
| Charlie Gnocchi | 59 | Fidenza | Radio host, painter and TV personality | 1 | 85 | 9th Evicted |
| Charlie Gnocchi | 59 | Fidenza | Radio host, painter and TV personality | 85 | 92 | 10th Evicted |
| Riccardo Fogli | 75 | Pontedera | Singer-songwriter | 85 | 86 | Ejected |
| Luciano Punzo | 26 | Naples | Model and TV personality | 46 | 78 | 8th Evicted |
| Pamela Prati | 63 | Ozieri | Actress, showgirl, singer, Grande Fratello VIP season 1 housemate | 1 | 53 | 7th Evicted |
| Carolina Marconi | 44 | Caracas, Venezuela | Actress, showgirl, Grande Fratello season 4 housemate | 4 | 46 | 6th Evicted |
| Elenoire Ferruzzi | 46 | Cittiglio | Showgirl and social media personality | 1 | 39 | 5th Evicted |
| Amaurys Pérez | 46 | Camagüey, Cuba | Water polo player | 1 | 39 | 4th Evicted |
| Cristina Quaranta | 50 | Rome | Showgirl, former velina of Striscia la notizia | 1 | 32 | 3rd Evicted |
| Francesca "Gegia" Antonaci | 63 | Galatina | Comedian, actress and TV presenter | 4 | 25 | 2nd Evicted |
| Sara Manfuso | 38 | Cassino | Opinionist, political commentator and former model | 1 | 17 | Walked |
| Giovanni Ciacci | 51 | Siena | Stylist and TV host | 4 | 15 | 1st Evicted |
| Ginevra Lamborghini | 29 | Bologna | Heiress, singer and sister of Elettra Lamborghini | 1 | 15 | Ejected |
| Marco Bellavia | 57 | Milan | Actor and TV presenter | 4 | 13 | Walked |

=== Guests ===
| Name | Birthplace | Famous for... | Duration |
|---|---|---|---|
| Ginevra Lamborghini | Bologna | Heiress, singer, partner of Antonino Spinalbese and sister of Elettra Lamborghini | Day 85 - 92 |
| Carla | Cortina d'Ampezzo | Nanny | Day 92 - 94 |
| Martina Nasoni | Terni | Winner of Grande Fratello 16 and former partner of Daniele Dal Moro | Day 141 - 165 |
| Matteo Diamante | Genova | Model, TV personality and former partner of Nikita Pelizon | Day 141 - 165 |
| Ivana Mrázová | Vimperk, Czech Republic | Model, TV personality and former partner of Luca Onestini | Day 141 - 165 |

== Nominations table ==
=== Week 1 - Week 8 ===
The housemate is immune.
The housemate is nominated by Grande Fratello as a disciplinary measure.

| | Week 1 | | Week 2 | | Week 3 | | Week 4 | | Week 5 | | Week 6 | | Week 7 | | Week 8 | | Nominations received |
| | Day 1 | Day 4 | Day 8 | Day 11 | Day 15 | Day 18 | Day 22 | Day 25 | Day 29 | Day 32 | Day 36 | Day 39 | Day 43 | Day 46 | Day 50 | Day 53 | Nominations received |
|---|---|---|---|---|---|---|---|---|---|---|---|---|---|---|---|---|---|
| Favorites of the House | none | | | Antonino; Carolina; Charlie; Daniele; Gegia; Ginevra; Luca; Wilma | none | Carolina; Charlie; Cristina; Daniele; Elenoire; Luca | Carolina; Daniele; Elenoire; George | Carolina; Daniele; Elenoire; Patrizia; Wilma | Daniele; Elenoire; Luca; Wilma | Antonino; Charlie; Daniele; George; Wilma | Antonella; Charlie; Daniele; Luca; Nikita; Wilma | Attilio; Luca; Patrizia; Wilma | Attilio; Luca; Wilma | Antonino; Charlie; Luca | Antonino; Charlie; Luca; Wilma | Antonella; Daniele; Luca | Nominations received |
| Favorites of the Opinionists | none | | | Elenoire; Patrizia | none | Amaurys; Nikita | Luca; Patrizia | Alberto; Charlie | Charlie; Edoardo | Alberto; Patrizia | Patrizia | Giaele; Edoardo | Giaele; Charlie | Giaele; Antonella | Patrizia | Giaele; Antonino | Nominations received |
| Nikita | Exempt | Antonella | Sara | Sara | No; Nominations | Alberto | Alberto | Antonino | Cristina | Giaele | Elenoire | Pamela | Daniele | Attilio | Giaele | Patrizia | |
| Oriana | Not in House | | | | | | | | | | | | | Exempt | | | |
| Alberto | Exempt | Attilio | Temporarily; Left | Pamela | No; Nominations | Gegia | Nikita | Nikita | Giaele | Amaurys | Pamela | Pamela | Patrizia | Daniele | Daniele | Charlie | |
| Giaele | Not in House | Exempt | Antonella | Marco | No; Nominations | Gegia | Wilma | Luca | Cristina | Carolina | Carolina | Pamela | Carolina | Nikita | George | George | |
| Tavassi | Not in House | | | | | | | | | | | | | Exempt | | | |
| Micol | Not in House | | | | | | | | | | | | | Exempt | | | |
| Onestini | Not in House | | | | | | | | | | | | | Exempt | | | |
| Antonella | Exempt | Pamela | Nikita | Giaele | No; Nominations | Gegia | Nikita | George | George | Giaele | Pamela | George | George | George | George | Wilma | |
| Daniele | Not in House | Exempt | Marco | Marco | No; Nominations | Gegia | Giaele | Pamela | Giaele | Giaele | Giaele | Pamela | Alberto | Alberto | Alberto | Alberto | |
| Edoardo | Not in House | Exempt | Marco | Marco | No; Nominations | Gegia | Amaurys | Antonino | Patrizia | Amaurys | Antonino | Charlie | Antonino | Patrizia | Pamela | Wilma | |
| Sarah | Not in House | | | | | | | | | | | | | Exempt | | | |
| Antonino | Exempt | George | Edoardo | Giovanni | No; Nominations | Gegia | Nikita | Nikita | Amaurys | Edoardo | George | Nikita | Edoardo | Nikita | Edoardo | Nikita | |
| Attilio | Exempt | Alberto | Luca | Marco | No; Nominations | Wilma | Wilma | Pamela | Giaele | Luca | Elenoire | Antonella | Patrizia | Wilma | Pamela | Patrizia | |
| George | Exempt | Alberto | Marco | Marco | No; Nominations | Gegia | Charlie | Antonella | Antonella | Antonella | Giaele | Antonella | Antonella | Patrizia | Giaele | Charlie | |
| Wilma | Not in House | Exempt | Antonella | Giaele | No; Nominations | Giaele | Attilio | Giaele | Giaele | Giaele | George | Antonella | Carolina | George | Pamela | Edoardo | |
| Patrizia | Exempt | Antonella | Temporarily; Left | Marco | Nominated | Pamela | Cristina | Cristina | Attilio | Carolina | Pamela | Daniele | George | George | Pamela | Charlie | |
| Luca | Exempt | George | Edoardo | Marco | No; Nominations | Giaele | Giaele | Giaele | Cristina | Attilio | Giaele | Pamela | Carolina | Attilio | Giaele | George | |
| Charlie | Exempt | Alberto | Daniele | Giaele | No; Nominations | Giaele | Giaele | Amaurys | George | Giaele | Pamela | Antonino | George | Attilio | Giaele | Attilio | |
| Luciano | Not in House | | | | | | | | | | | | | Exempt | | | |
| Pamela | Exempt | Antonella | Antonella | Marco | No; Nominations | Gegia | Charlie | Attilio | Alberto | Giaele | Antonino | Nikita | Carolina | Nikita | Edoardo | Evicted (Day 53) | 21 |
| Carolina | Not in House | Exempt | Giaele | Giaele | No; Nominations | Giaele | Attilio | Attilio | Giaele | Giaele | Pamela | Pamela | Patrizia | Evicted (Day 46) | | | 7 |
| Elenoire | Exempt | Patrizia | Gegia | Nikita | Nominated | Attilio | Attilio | Nikita | Attilio | Attilio | George | Nominated | Evicted (Day 39) | | | | 2 |
| Amaurys | Exempt | Luca | Marco | Marco | No; Nominations | Edoardo | Charlie | Antonino | Alberto | Edoardo | Pamela | Evicted (Day 39) | | | | | 6 |
| Cristina | Exempt | Antonella | Antonella | Marco | No; Nominations | Gegia | Charlie | Giaele | Giaele | Evicted (Day 32) | | | | | | | 6 |
| Gegia | Not in House | Exempt | Antonella | Giaele | Nominated | Antonella | Alberto | Evicted (Day 25) | | | | | | | | | 10 |
| Sara | Exempt | Patrizia | Nikita | Marco | No; Nominations | Walked (Day 17) | | | | | | | | | | | 2 |
| Giovanni | Not in House | Exempt | Marco | Marco | Nominated | Evicted (Day 15) | | | | | | | | | | | 2 |
| Ginevra | Exempt | Cristina | Giaele | Giaele | Ejected (Day 15) | | | | | | | | | | | | 0 |
| Marco | Not in House | Exempt | Daniele | Giovanni | Walked (Day 13) | | | | | | | | | | | | 17 |
| Notes | | | | | | | | | | | | | | | | | |
| Nominated | none | none | Antonella; Daniele; Edoardo; Giaele; Marco; Nikita | Giaele; Giovanni; Marco | Elenoire; Gegia; Giovanni; Patrizia | Alberto; Antonella; Attilio; Edoardo; Gegia; Giaele; Pamela; Wilma | Attilio; Charlie; Gegia; Giaele; Nikita | Antonino; Giaele; Nikita | Alberto; Antonino; Atiilio; Cristina; George; Giaele | Amaurys; Attilio; Carolina; Edoardo; Giaele | Amaurys; George; Giaele; Pamela | Elenoire | Carolina; George; Pamela; Patrizia | Attilio; George; Nikita | Attilio; Giaele; Pamela | Charlie; George; Patrizia; Wilma | |
| Nominated | none | none | Antonella; Daniele; Edoardo; Giaele; Marco; Nikita | Giaele; Giovanni; Marco | Elenoire; Gegia; Giovanni; Patrizia | Alberto; Antonella; Attilio; Edoardo; Gegia; Giaele; Pamela; Wilma | Attilio; Charlie; Gegia; Giaele; Nikita | Antonino; Giaele; Nikita | Alberto; Antonino; Atiilio; Cristina; George; Giaele | Amaurys; Attilio; Carolina; Edoardo; Giaele | Amaurys; George; Giaele; Pamela | Antonella; Nikita; Pamela | Carolina; George; Pamela; Patrizia | Attilio; George; Nikita | Attilio; Giaele; Pamela | Charlie; George; Patrizia; Wilma | |
| Evicted | none | Antonella; 4 of 8 votes to face the consequence | Antonella; 47.8% to be immune | Eviction cancelled | Giovanni; 3.1% to save | Antonella; 42.0% to be immune | Gegia; 8.7% to save | Nikita; 47.9% to be immune | Cristina; 7.6% to save | Edoardo; 39.7% to be immune | Amaurys; 18.9% to save | Elenoire; 90.0% to evict | Carolina; 15.1% to save | Nikita; 51.6% to be immune | Pamela; 27.6% to save | Eviction cancelled | |
| Evicted | none | Alberto; 3 of 7 votes to face the consequence | Antonella; 47.8% to be immune | Eviction cancelled | Giovanni; 3.1% to save | Antonella; 42.0% to be immune | Gegia; 8.7% to save | Nikita; 47.9% to be immune | Cristina; 7.6% to save | Edoardo; 39.7% to be immune | Amaurys; 18.9% to save | Nikita; 54.0% to be immune | Carolina; 15.1% to save | Nikita; 51.6% to be immune | Pamela; 27.6% to save | Eviction cancelled | |
| Saved | none | none | Nikita; 18.8% Marco; 15.4% Daniele; 8.0% Edoardo; 7.9% Giaele; 2.1% | Eviction cancelled | Patrizia; 79.5% Elenoire; 13.6% Gegia; 3.8% | Edoardo; 14.5% Alberto; 14.4% Pamela; 13.9% Attilio; 5.5% Wilma; 3.7% Giaele; 3.3% Gegia; 2.7% | Nikita; 48.1% Giaele; 16.1% Attilio; 15.0% Charlie; 12.1% | Antonino; 45.7% Giaele; 6.4% | George; 28.0% Antonino; 26.7% Giaele; 14.7% Attilio; 12.9% Alberto; 10.1% | Giaele; 28.3% Amaurys; 11.9% Attilio; 10.1% Carolina; 10.0% | George; 38.0% Giaele; 21.6% Pamela; 21.5% | Elenoire; 10.0% to save | George; 41.7% Patrizia; 25.1% Pamela; 18.1% | George; 33.0% Attilio; 15.4% | Giaele; 37.6% Attilio; 34.8% | Eviction cancelled | |
| Saved | none | none | Nikita; 18.8% Marco; 15.4% Daniele; 8.0% Edoardo; 7.9% Giaele; 2.1% | Eviction cancelled | Patrizia; 79.5% Elenoire; 13.6% Gegia; 3.8% | Edoardo; 14.5% Alberto; 14.4% Pamela; 13.9% Attilio; 5.5% Wilma; 3.7% Giaele; 3.3% Gegia; 2.7% | Nikita; 48.1% Giaele; 16.1% Attilio; 15.0% Charlie; 12.1% | Antonino; 45.7% Giaele; 6.4% | George; 28.0% Antonino; 26.7% Giaele; 14.7% Attilio; 12.9% Alberto; 10.1% | Giaele; 28.3% Amaurys; 11.9% Attilio; 10.1% Carolina; 10.0% | George; 38.0% Giaele; 21.6% Pamela; 21.5% | Antonella; 38.0% Pamela; 8.0% | George; 41.7% Patrizia; 25.1% Pamela; 18.1% | George; 33.0% Attilio; 15.4% | Giaele; 37.6% Attilio; 34.8% | Eviction cancelled | |
| Walked | none | | | Marco | Sara | none | | | | | | | | | | | |
| Ejected | none | | | | Ginevra | none | | | | | | | | | | | |

=== Week 9 - Week 24 ===
The contestant is immune.
The contestant is not save and is nominated automatically.
The contestant is evicted, returns to the game with ticket of return.
The housemate is nominated by Grande Fratello as a disciplinary measure.

| | Week 9 | Week 10 | Week 11 | Week 12 | | Week 13 | | Week 14 | Week 15 | Week 16 | Week 17 | Week 18 | Week 19 | Week 20 | Week 21 | | Week 22 | | Week 23 | | Week 24 | | Nominations received |
| | Day 57 | Day 64 | Day 71 | Day 78 | Day 83 | Day 85 | Day 90 | Day 92 | Day 99 | Day 106 | Day 113 | Day 120 | Day 127 | Day 134 | Day 141 | Day 144 | Day 148 | Day 151 | Day 155 | Day 158 | Day 162 | Day 165 | Nominations received |
|---|---|---|---|---|---|---|---|---|---|---|---|---|---|---|---|---|---|---|---|---|---|---|---|
| Favorites of the House | none | | Daniele; Luca; Onestini | Antonino; Luca | Onestini | Antonino; Nikita; Onestini; Patrizia | Luca; Onestini; Tavassi | Daniele; Nikita; Onestini; Patrizia | Daniele; Onestini; Tavassi | Antonella; Daniele; Micol; Onestini | Antonella; Davide; Micol; Tavassi | Antonino; Attilio; Davide; Onestini | Andrea; Attilio; Daniele; Davide; Micol; Onestini | Daniele; Onestini; Oriana; Sarah; Tavassi | Davide; Giaele; Oriana; Tavassi | Andrea; Sarah; Tavassi | Davide; Micol; Tavassi | Edoardo; Micol; Tavassi | Davide; Oriana; Tavassi | none | | | Nominations received |
| Favorites of the Opinionists | none | | Oriana; Antonino | none | Antonino | Oriana; Antonella | Oriana; Antonella | Giaele; Attilio | Antonino; Patrizia | Giaele; Nikita | Onestini; Attilio | Oriana; Antonella | Antonino; Antonella | Edoardo; Attilio | Murgia; Antonella | Onestini; Antonella | Giaele; Daniele | Onestini; Antonella | Onestini; Edoardo | none | | | Nominations received |
| Nikita | Antonino to not save | Saved | Patrizia | Alberto | Attilio | Attilio | Antonino | Antonella | Giaele | Oriana | Wilma | Alberto | Oriana | Alberto | Antonino | Antonino | Oriana | Murgia | Murgia | Onestini | Tavassi | Micol | |
| Oriana | Micol to not save | Daniele to not save | Giaele | Daniele | Attilio | Attilio | Antonino | Antonella | Wilma | Dana | Nikita | Nikita | Nikita | Davide | Antonino | Davide | Antonino | Andrea | Antonino | Andrea | Davide | Andrea | |
| Alberto | Not saved | Attilio; Charlie to be immune | Temporarily; Left | Daniele | Attilio | Daniele | Antonino | Antonino | Attilio | Dana | Wilma | Milena | Nikita | Antonella | Daniele | Daniele | Nikita | Daniele | Nikita | Antonella | Nikita | Davide | |
| Giaele | Daniele to not save | Saved | Patrizia | Charlie | Luca | Sarah | Patrizia | Antonella | Nikita | Dana | Nikita | George | Nikita | Davide | Attilio | Davide | Antonella | Sarah | Antonella | Antonella | Sarah | Antonella | |
| Tavassi | Saved | Exempt | Daniele | Charlie | George | Sarah | George | Antonella | Sarah | Davide | Sarah | Sarah | Sarah | Nikita | Attilio | Davide | Antonella | Andrea | Antonella | Antonella | Antonella | Davide | |
| Micol | Alberto to not save | Oriana to not save | Wilma | Charlie | Alberto | Sarah | Charlie | Antonella | Sarah | Davide | George | George | George | Antonella | Attilio | Davide | Antonella | Sarah | Antonella | Antonella | Antonella | Antonella | |
| Milena | Not in House | | | | | Exempt | | | | Andrea | Alberto | Daniele | Nikita | Antonella | Temporarily; Left | | Antonino | Antonino | Giaele | Oriana | Sarah | Davide | |
| Onestini | Attilio to be immune | Attilio; Charlie to be immune | Luciano | Daniele | Luca | Daniele | Antonino | Antonino | Nikita | Davide | Nikita | Nikita | Nikita | Nikita | Antonino | Antonino | Nikita | Antonino | Antonella | Nikita | Nikita | Nikita | |
| Andrea | Not in House | | | | | | | Exempt | | Murgia | Murgia | Sarah | Oriana | Nikita | Sarah | Oriana | Oriana | Sarah | Nikita | Oriana | Oriana | Oriana | |
| Antonella | Wilma to not save | Micol to not save | George | Daniele | Attilio | Micol | Micol | Micol | Micol | Oriana | Murgia | Oriana | Oriana | Murgia | Micol | Micol | Oriana | Daniele | Micol | Giaele | Micol | Tavassi | |
| Daniele | Oriana to not save | Not saved | Patrizia | Alberto | Alberto | Alberto | Patrizia | Sarah | Sarah | Dana | Murgia | Murgia | Milena | Alberto | Onestini | Murgia | Antonella | Murgia | Antonella | Antonella | Edoardo | Antonella | |
| Davide | Not in House | | | | | | Exempt | | | Oriana | Murgia | Giaele | Oriana | Giaele | Onestini | Oriana | Oriana | Giaele | Micol | Oriana | Edoardo | Tavassi | |
| Edoardo | Luciano to not save | Sarah to not save | Wilma | Charlie | Attilio | Attilio | Antonino | Antonino | Wilma | Dana | Wilma | Wilma | Oriana | Antonino | Attilio | Antonino | Antonino | Antonino | Antonino | Nikita | Nikita | Davide | |
| Sarah | Saved | George to not save | Edoardo | Daniele | Tavassi | Attilio | Giaele | Tavassi | Nikita | George | Nikita | Tavassi | George | Andrea | Andrea | Murgia | Andrea | Andrea | Exempt | Giaele | Tavassi | Re-evicted (Day 165) | 24 |
| Murgia | Not in House | | | | | | Exempt | | | Dana | Andrea | George | George | Antonella | Sarah | Daniele | Nikita | Sarah | Nikita | Nikita | Evicted (Day 162) | | 13 |
| Antonino | Edoardo to not save | Luciano to not save | Luciano | Charlie | Edoardo | Edoardo | Edoardo | Edoardo | Edoardo | Temporarily; Left | | Edoardo | Oriana | Nikita | Edoardo | Edoardo | Edoardo | Sarah | Nikita | Evicted (Day 158) | | | 34 |
| Attilio | Onestini to be immune | Charlie; Onestini to be immune | Micol | Alberto | Edoardo | Edoardo | Charlie | Wilma | Wilma | Milena | Wilma | Wilma | Edoardo | Micol | Edoardo | Edoardo | Evicted (Day 148) | | | | | | 38 |
| George | Antonella to not save | Antonella to not save | Antonella | Tavassi | Tavassi | Tavassi | Antonino | Antonella | Sarah | Davide | Murgia | Wilma | Sarah | Evicted (Day 134) | | | | | | | | | 28 |
| Wilma | Nikita to not save | Charlie; Patrizia to be immune | Charlie | Edoardo | Edoardo | Attilio | Attilio | Oriana | Nikita | Exempt | Nikita | Alberto | Re-evicted (Day 127) | | | | | | | | | | 21 |
| Dana | Not in House | | | | | | | Exempt | | Oriana | Giaele | Evicted (Day 120) | | | | | | | | | | | 6 |
| Patrizia | Charlie to be immune | Charlie; Wilma to be immune | Micol | Daniele | Attilio | Giaele | Giaele | Oriana | Wilma | Walked (Day 106) | | | | | | | | | | | | | 18 |
| Luca | Saved | Saved | Luciano | Alberto | Alberto | Attilio | Alberto | Sarah | Walked (Day 99) | | | | | | | | | | | | | | 6 |
| Charlie | Patrizia to be immune | Onestini; Patrizia to be immune | Micol | Edoardo | Tavassi | Exempt | Attilio | Re-evicted (Day 92) | | | | | | | | | | | | | | | 16 |
| Riccardo | Not in House | | | | | Exempt | Ejected (Day 86) | | | | | | | | | | | | | | | | 0 |
| Luciano | Giaele to not save | Edoardo to not save | Attilio | Evicted (Day 78) | | | | | | | | | | | | | | | | | | | 3 |
| Notes | | | | All women immune | All women immune | | | | | | | | | | | | | | | | | | |
| Nominated | Attilio; Charlie; Luca; Onestini; Patrizia; Sarah; Tavassi | Charlie; Giaele; Luca; Nikita | Micol; Luciano; Patrizia | Charlie; Daniele | Attilio; Charlie | Attilio; Daniele; Edoardo; Sarah | Antonino; Attilio; Charlie; Giaele; Patrizia; Sarah | Antonella; Antonino; Oriana; Sarah | Nikita; Oriana; Sarah; Wilma | Dana; Davide; Oriana | Dana; Murgia; Nikita | Alberto; George; Giaele; Nikita; Sarah; Wilma | George; Nikita; Oriana | Alberto; Antonella; Davide; Nikita | Antonino; Attilio; Edoardo; Onestini; Sarah | Antonino; Attilio; Daniele; Davide; Edoardo; Murgia; Nikita; Oriana | Antonella; Antonino; Nikita; Oriana | Andrea; Antonino; Daniele; Murgia; Nikita; Sarah | Antonella; Antonino; Micol; Nikita | Antonella; Edoardo; Micol; Murgia; Nikita; Oriana; Tavassi | Antonella; Edoardo; Nikita; Sarah; Tavassi | Andrea; Antonella; Davide; Micol; Nikita; Oriana; Tavassi | |
| Evicted | Tavassi; 48.6% to be immune | Nikita; 41.3% to be immune | Luciano; 13.7% to save | Charlie; 27.3% to be immune | Charlie; 40.0% to save | Daniele; 44.7% to be immune | Charlie; 7.8% to save | Antonella; 45.0% to be immune | Wilma; 11.0% to save | Oriana; 57.4% to be immune | Dana; 27.6% to save | Wilma; 2.5% to save | George; 22.1% to save | Alberto; 38.9% to be immune | Attilio; 6.1% to save | Attilio; 5.0% to save | Oriana; 43.5% to be immune | Sarah; 9.4% to save | Antonino; 12.1% to save | Murgia; 7.3% to save | Sarah; 11.8% to save | Oriana; 28.3% to be finalist | |
| Saved | Luca; 20.7% Patrizia; 13.1% Onestini; 8.6% Attilio; 4.3% Sarah; 3.7% Charlie; 1.0% | Luca; 28.2% Giaele; 27.7% Charlie; 2.8% | Micol; 59.9% Patrizia; 26.4% | Daniele; 72.7% to be immune | Attilio; 60.0% | Edoardo; 39.9% Sarah; 10.7% Attilio; 4.6% | Giaele; 29.7% Antonino; 25.3% Patrizia; 13.2% Attilio; 12.1% Sarah; 11.9% | Oriana; 36.7% Antonino; 12.9% Sarah; 5.4% | Oriana; 35.2% Nikita; 34.5% Sarah; 19.3% | Davide; 22.2% Dana; 20.4% | Nikita; 42.9% Murgia; 29.5% | Nikita; 34.5% Giaele; 23.4% Alberto; 15.8% George; 12.7% Sarah; 11.1% | Oriana; 40.1% Nikita; 37.8% | Antonella; 29.9% Nikita; 26.9% Davide; 4.3% | Edoardo; 43.0% Onestini; 26.1% Antonino; 15.9% Sarah; 8.9% | Edoardo; 26.1% Nikita; 21.4% Oriana; 20.2% Murgia; 7.8% Daniele; 7.4% Antonino; 6.2% Davide; 5.9% | Antonella; 28.7% Nikita; 22.5% Antonino; 5.3% | Daniele; 23.9% Nikita; 22.5% Murgia; 18.6% Andrea; 16.1% Antonino; 9.5% | Micol; 33.5% Antonella; 30.1% Nikita; 24.3% | Oriana; 19.5% Nikita; 19.3% Antonella; 15.9% Edoardo; 13.6% Micol; 12.4% Tavassi; 12.0% | Tavassi; 33.8% Nikita; 18.7% Antonella; 18.1% Edoardo; 17.6% | Tavassi; 26.5% Antonella; 24.2% Nikita; 17.7% Micol; 1.2% Andrea; 1.1% Davide; 1.0% | |
| Walked | none | | | | | | | | Luca | Patrizia | none | | | | | | | | | | | | |
| Ejected | none | | | | | Riccardo | none | | | | | | | | | | | | | | | | |

=== Week 25 - Finale ===
The contestant is immune.
The contestant is evicted, returns to the game with ticket of return.

| | Week 25 | | | Week 26 | | | Week 27 | Week 28 | | Week 29 - Finale | | | | | Nominations received |
| | Day 169 | | Day 172 | Day 176 | Day 179 | | Day 183 | Day 190 | | Day 197 | | | | | Nominations received |
|---|---|---|---|---|---|---|---|---|---|---|---|---|---|---|---|
| Favorites of the House | none | | | | | | | | | | | | | | Nominations received |
| Favorites of the Opinionists | none | | | | | | | | | | | | | | Nominations received |
| Nikita | Davide to save | Giaele | Andrea | Giaele | Saved | Giaele | Andrea | Alberto; Alberto | Finalist | Nominated | Exempt | | Nominated | Winner (Day 197) | 75 |
| Oriana | Tavassi | Nikita | Andrea | Nikita | Exempt | Nikita | Tavassi | Nikita | Finalist | Exempt | Nominated | Exempt | Nominated | Runner-up (Day 197) | 23 |
| Alberto | Edoardo to save | Davide | Andrea | Giaele | Onestini to save | Andrea | Andrea | Nikita; Onestini | Nominated | Exempt | | Nominated | Nominated | Third Place (Day 197) | 31 |
| Giaele | Onestini to save | Nikita | Nikita | Daniele | Tavassi to save | Nikita | Tavassi | Nikita | Finalist | Exempt | | Nominated | Fourth Place (Day 197) | | 57 |
| Tavassi | Micol to save | Nikita | Nikita | Nikita | Daniele to save | Nikita | Nikita | Nikita | Finalist | Exempt | Nominated | Fifth Place (Day 197) | | | 13 |
| Micol | Giaele to save | Nikita | Nikita | Antonella | Alberto | Nikita | Tavassi | Nikita | Finalist | Nominated | Sixth Place (Day 197) | | | | 15 |
| Milena | Not saved | Onestini | Nikita | Onestini | Nikita to save | Giaele | Onestini | Onestini; Saved | Nominated | Evicted (Day 197) | | | | | 8 |
| Onestini | Alberto to save | Nikita | Nikita | Nikita | Giaele to save | Milena | Milena | Milena; Nominated | Evicted (Day 190) | | | | | | 8 |
| Andrea | Daniele to save | Nikita | Nikita | Exempt | Milena to save | Alberto | Alberto | Re-evicted (Day 190) | | | | | | | 15 |
| Antonella | Nikita to save | Alberto | Daniele | Micol | Not saved | Tavassi | Evicted (Day 183) | | | | | | | | 49 |
| Daniele | Saved | Antonella | Giaele | Milena | Andrea to save | Milena | Ejected (Day 180) | | | | | | | | 22 |
| Davide | Andrea to save | Giaele | Evicted (Day 172) | | | | | | | | | | | | 16 |
| Edoardo | Antonella to save | Nikita | Ejected (Day 172) | | | | | | | | | | | | 28 |
| Notes | | | | | | | | | | | | | | | |
| Nominated | Alberto; Antonella; Davide; Giaele; Milena; Nikita; Onestini | | Andrea; Daniele; Giaele; Nikita | Antonella; Daniele; Giaele; Micol; Milena; Nikita; Onestini | Antonella; Giaele; Milena; Nikita | | Alberto; Andrea; Milena; Nikita; Onestini; Tavassi | Alberto; Nikita; Onestini | Alberto; Milena | Micol; Nikita | Oriana; Tavassi | Alberto; Giaele | Alberto; Nikita; Oriana | Nikita; Oriana | |
| Evicted | Davide; 4.6% to save | | Andrea; 11.2% to save | Micol; 33.2% to be finalist | Giaele; 48.2% to be finalist | | Tavassi; 54.7% to be finalist | Nikita; 47.6% to be finalist | Milena; 48.5% to be finalist | Micol; 45.4% to save | Tavassi; 40.2% to save | Giaele; 45.4% to save | Alberto; 5.5% to win | Oriana; 47.2% to win | |
| Evicted | Davide; 4.6% to save | | Andrea; 11.2% to save | Micol; 33.2% to be finalist | Antonella; 8.1% to be finalist | | Andrea; 0.9% to be finalist | Onestini; 24.0% to be finalist | Milena; 48.5% to be finalist | Micol; 45.4% to save | Tavassi; 40.2% to save | Giaele; 45.4% to save | Alberto; 5.5% to win | Oriana; 47.2% to win | |
| Saved | Antonella; 30.2% Nikita; 24.7% Giaele; 11.9% Alberto; 10.9% Onestini; 10.3% Milena; 7.4% | | Nikita; 33.7% Daniele; 33.0% Giaele; 22.1% | Antonella; 21.5% Daniele; 21.1% Nikita; 19.4% Onestini; 3.2% Milena; 1.1% Giaele; 0.5% | Nikita; 24.7% Milena; 19.0% | | Nikita; 36.0% Alberto; 3.7% Onestini; 3.4% Milena; 1.3% | Alberto; 28.4% | Alberto; 51.5% to be finalist | Nikita; 54.6% | Oriana; 59.8% | Alberto; 54.6% | Nikita; 51.0% Oriana; 43.5% | Nikita; 52.8% to win | |
| Walked | none | | | | | | | | | | | | | | |
| Ejected | none | | Edoardo | none | Daniele | | none | | | | | | | | |

=== Notes ===
- ^Note 1:
- ^Note 2:
- ^Note 3:

== TV Ratings and guests ==
Live shows

| Week | Episode | Date | Viewers | Share | Guest |
|---|---|---|---|---|---|
| 1 | 1 | September 19, 2022 | 2,636,000 | 21.73% | Pierpaolo Pretelli, Soleil Sorge |
| 1 | 2 | September 22, 2022 | 2,266,000 | 19.48% | Carmen Russo |
| 2 | 3 | September 26, 2022 | 2,447,000 | 17.84% | Giucas Casella, Soraia Allam Cerruti |
| 2 | 4 | September 29, 2021 | 2,297,000 | 19.48% | Adriana Volpe, Andrea Gori, Carmen Russo |
| 3 | 5 | October 3, 2022 | 3,313,000 | 25.10% | none |
| 3 | 6 | October 6, 2022 | 2,761,000 | 21.30% | Carmen, Russo, Giovanna Arfil, Marilena Ciupilan |
| 4 | 7 | October 10, 2022 | 2,730,000 | 20.86% | Angela Rende |
| 4 | 8 | October 13, 2022 | 2,541,000 | 19.50% | Aurora De Stefani, Carmen Russo, Rita Papa |
| 5 | 9 | October 17, 2022 | 2,652,000 | 20.80% | Alessandro Tulli |
| 5 | 10 | October 20, 2022 | 2,391,000 | 19.30% | Carmen Russo |
| 6 | 11 | October 24, 2022 | 2,501,000 | 19.70% | Jessica Pelizon, Raffaele Pelizon |
| 6 | 12 | October 27, 2022 | 2,602,000 | 20.60% | Carmen Russo, Emanuela Folliero, Giuseppe Pireddu, Sebastiana Pireddu |
| 7 | 13 | October 31, 2022 | 2,395,000 | 20.30% | Carolina Ghiozzi, Stefano Fiordelisi |
| 7 | 14 | November 3, 2022 | 2,659,000 | 20.80% | Carmen Russo |
| 8 | 15 | November 7, 2022 | 2,611,000 | 21.50% | Gianluca Benincasa, Manuela Donda |
| 8 | 16 | November 10, 2022 | 2,596,000 | 20.70% | Andrea De Donà, Carmen Russo, Soraia Allam Cerruti |
| 9 | 17 | November 14, 2022 | 2,770,000 | 21.90% | Carmen Russo, Guendalina Tavassi, Paolo Ciavarro |
| 10 | 18 | November 21, 2022 | 2,881,000 | 23.10% | Carmen Russo, Clarissa Hailé Selassié, Jessica Hailé Selassié, Lucrezia Hailé Selassié, Marilena Ciupilan, Taylor Mega |
| 11 | 19 | November 28, 2022 | 2,811,000 | 22.83% | Carmen Russo, Clizia Incorvaia |
| 12 | 20 | December 5, 2022 | 2,892,000 | 22.92% | Carmen Russo, Assunta & Lucia Spinalbese, Mehmet Bozkurt |
| 12 | 21 | December 10, 2022 | 2,482,000 | 20.73% | Carmen Russo, Chicca Bianco, Crista Donnamaria |
| 13 | 22 | December 12, 2022 | 2,854,000 | 22.79% | Carmen Russo, Alessandro Rossi, Francesca Cipriani, Katia Ricciarelli, Michela Dal Moro |
| 13 | 23 | December 17, 2022 | 2,104,000 | 16.30% | Carmen Russo, Emanuela Fuin, Gianlorenzo Fabbri, Ugo Goich |
| 14 | 24 | December 19, 2022 | 2,819,000 | 23.20% | Antonio Salatino, Rita Papa, Samara Tramontana, Alessandro Basciano, Sophie Codegoni |
| 15 | 25 | December 26, 2022 | 2,416,000 | 19.10% | Carmen Russo, Matthias De Donà, Soraia Allam Cerruti |
| 16 | 26 | January 2, 2023 | 2,951,000 | 21.90% | Carmen Russo, Mariolina Legrottaglie, Soraia Allam Cerruti |
| 17 | 27 | January 9, 2023 | 2,682,000 | 20.10% | Carmen Russo, Salvatore and Clizia Incorvaia, Cristina Marzoli |
| 18 | 28 | January 16, 2023 | 2,570,000 | 19.70% | Carmen Russo, Valerio Tremiterra, Le Deva |
| 19 | 29 | January 23, 2023 | 2,639,000 | 19.10% | Carmen Russo, Carla Onestini |
| 20 | 30 | January 30, 2023 | 2,698,000 | 20.60% | Carmen Russo, Ivana Mrázová, Gian Pietro Dal Moro, Vincenzo Donnamaria |
| 21 | 31 | February 6, 2023 | 2,780,000 | 20.60% | Carmen Russo |
| 21 | 32 | February 9, 2023 | 1,790,000 | 10.88% | none |
| 22 | 33 | February 13, 2023 | 2,676,000 | 19.80% | Carmen Russo, Emanuela Fuin, Monia Maestrelli, Tony Toscano |
| 22 | 34 | February 16, 2023 | 2,480,000 | 18.64% | none |
| 23 | 35 | February 20, 2023 | 2,709,000 | 20.30% | Carmen Russo, Raffaello Tonon, Giusy Altobello |
| 23 | 36 | February 23, 2023 | 2,759,000 | 21.10% | Carmen Russo, Sofia Graiani |
| 24 | 37 | February 27, 2023 | 2,899,000 | 21.40% | Carmen Russo, Ilenia Virno, Pierpaolo Pretelli |
| 24 | 38 | March 2, 2023 | 2,574,000 | 19.40% | Tony Toscano, Vincenzo Donnamaria |
| 25 | 39 | March 6, 2023 | 2,915,000 | 22.60% | Giulia Logozzo |
| 25 | 40 | March 9, 2023 | 2,719,000 | 20.40% | Ivana Mrázová, Manila Nazzaro |
| 26 | 41 | March 13, 2023 | 2,862,000 | 22.50% | Stefano Fiordelisi, Marco Giro |
| 26 | 42 | March 16, 2023 | 2,472,000 | 19.07% | Matteo Materazzi |
| 27 | 43 | March 20, 2023 | 2,671,000 | 21.64% | Marilena and Tatiana De Donà |
| 28 | Semifinal | March 27, 2023 | 2,857,000 | 20.72% | Agnese, Sofia and Mauro Graiani, Gianmarco Onestini |
| 29 | Final | April 3, 2023 | 2,871,000 | 24.00% | Sabrina, Jessica, Raffaele and Mauro Pelizon, Clizia, Mattia and Salvatore Incorvaia, Mauro Graiani, Federico, Alessandro and Luciano Tavassi, Cristina Marzoli, Brad Ford, Pierpaolo Pretelli, Soleil Sorge, Manuela Donda |
| Average | | | 2,649,000 | 20.58% | |
