= Grande Fratello VIP season 6 =

Grande Fratello VIP
- Season 6
- Presented by: Alfonso Signorini
- No. of days: 183
- No. of housemates: 38
- Winner: Jessica Hailé Selassié
- Runner-up: Davide Silvestri
- No. of episodes: 49

Release
- Original network: Canale 5
- Original release: September 13, 2021 – March 14, 2022

Season chronology
- ← Previous; Season 5 Next → Season 7

Grande Fratello VIP 6 (also known by the acronym GFVIP6) is the sixth celebrity season of the Italian reality television franchise Grande Fratello.

It's the second season to air in 2021, and was launched on September 13 on Canale 5.

Alfonso Signorini returned as the host of the main show, with season 4 housemate Adriana Volpe and businesswoman Sonia Bruganelli as opinionists. In the fourth and fifth live shows sisters, Adriana Maria e Rosella Rota took the role of the "Popular" opinionists, and in the thirty-first and thirty-second live shows season 1 housemate Laura Freddi replaced Sonia Bruganelli who was temporarily away to celebrate New Year's Day.

On November 12, 2021, Signorini announced that the season would last until March 14, 2022, making it at the time the longest Italian celebrity season and tying Grande Fratello 11 making it the longest celebrity season at the time, being later surpassed by Grande Fratello VIP 7.

Tommaso Zorzi was announced as the winner of the season.

== Housemates ==
The age of the housemates refers to the time of entry into the house.

Housemates	Age	Birthplace	Famous for...	Day entered	Day exited	Status
Jessica Hailé Selassié	27	Rome	Descendant of Hailé Selassié	1	183	Winner
Davide Silvestri	40	Milan	Actor	5	183	Runner-up
Gherardo "Barù" Gaetani Dell'Aquila D'Aragona	40	Bolgheri	Chef, TV personality, nephew of Costantino della Gherardesca	99	183	3rd Place
Delia Duran	33	Mérida, Venezuela	Actress and model	124	183	4th Place
Lucrezia "Lulù" Hailé Selassié	23	Rome	Descendant of Hailé Selassié	1	183	5th Place
Giucas Casella	71	Termini Imerese	Illusionist	5	172	23rd Evicted
Giucas Casella	71	Termini Imerese	Illusionist	172	183	29th Evicted
Sophie Codegoni	19	Riccione	TV personality	5	179	28th Evicted
Manila Nazzaro	43	Foggia	TV host, Miss Italia 1999	1	179	27th Evicted
Soleil Sorge	27	Los Angeles, USA	Influencer and TV personality	1	176	26th Evicted
Miriana Trevisan	48	Naples	Showgirl	5	68	9th Evicted
Miriana Trevisan	48	Naples	Showgirl	68	176	25th Evicted
Antonio Medugno	23	Naples	Teacher and influencer	138	172	24th Evicted
Alessandro Basciano	32	Genoa	Businessman and TV personality	96	169	22nd Evicted
Nathaly Caldonazzo	52	Rome	Actress and showgirl	99	169	21st Evicted
Katia Ricciarelli	75	Rovigo	Soprano	1	165	20th Evicted
Kabir Bedi	75	Lahore, Pakistan	Actor	113	162	19th Evicted
Gianluca Costantino	33	Naples	Model and personal trainer	138	155	18th Evicted
Gianmaria Antinolfi	36	Naples	Entrepreneur	1	141	Walked
Federica Calemme	25	Casalnuovo di Napoli	Influencer and model	96	138	17th Evicted
Manuel Bortuzzo	22	Trieste	Swimmer	1	134	Walked
Giacomo Urtis	44	Caracas, Venezuela	Medical doctor, TV personality, Grande Fratello VIP season 5 housemate	78	131	16th Evicted
Valeria Marini	54	Rome	Showgirl, TV personality, Grande Fratello VIP season 1 and season 4 housemate	78	131	16th Evicted
Carmen Russo	61	Genoa	Tv dancer, showgirl, Grande Fratello VIP season 2 housemate	1	124	15th Evicted
Eva Grimaldi	60	Nogarole Rocca	Actress and model	96	113	14th Evicted
Biagio D'Anelli	38	Rodi Garganico	TV personality, Grande Fratello season 11 housemate	78	106	13th Evicted
Aldo Montano	42	Livorno	Olympic fencing medalist	1	96	Walked
Francesca Cipriani	37	Popoli	TV personality, Grande Fratello season 6 housemate	1	92	Walked
Alex Belli	38	Parma	Actor	1	92	Ejected
Maria Monsè	47	Castel di Iudica	TV personality, Grande Fratello VIP season 3 housemate	71	92	12th Evicted
Patrizia Pellegrino	59	Torre Annunziata	Actress, singer and TV personality	71	85	11th Evicted
Clarissa Hailé Selassié	19	Rome	Descendant of Hailé Selassié	1	78	10th Evicted
Nicola Pisu	32	Trento	Patrizia Mirigliani's son	5	61	8th Evicted
Jo Squillo	59	Milan	Songwriter and TV host	5	54	7th Evicted
Ainett Stephens	39	Ciudad Guayana, Venezuela	TV personality	1	47	6th Evicted
Raffaella Fico	33	Cercola	Showgirl, Grande Fratello season 8 housemate	1	40	5th Evicted
Amedeo Goria	67	Turin	Sports journalist	1	33	4th Evicted
Samy Youssef	26	Sharm El Sheikh, Egypt	Model	5	26	3rd Evicted
Andrea Casalino	38	Brindisi	Actor and model	5	19	2nd Evicted
Tommaso Eletti	21	Rome	TV personality	1	12	1st Evicted

=== Guests ===
Name	Age	Birthplace	Famous for...	Duration
Alessandro Rossi	30	Cesenatico	Entrepreneur; Boyfriend of Francesca Cipriani	Day 40 - 43
Alex Belli	39	Parma	Actor	Day 155 - 162

== Nominations table ==
=== Week 1 - Week 8 ===
3-in-1 housemate called 'The Selassiés', their nominations counted as one (Week 1 - 10).
The contestant is immune.

	Week 1		Week 2		Week 3		Week 4		Week 5		Week 6		Week 7			Week 8		Nominations received
	Day 1	Day 5	Day 8	Day 12	Day 15	Day 19	Day 22	Day 26	Day 29	Day 33	Day 36	Day 40	Day 43	Day 47		Day 50	Day 54	Nominations received
Favorites of the House	none	Aldo; Alex; Katia; Manila; Manuel	Giucas; Miriana	Alex; Carmen; Jo; Manila; Manuel; Raffaella; The Selassiés	Ainett; Alex; Carmen; Giucas; Jo; Katia; Manila; Manuel; Miriana	Ainett; Alex; Jo; Katia; Manila; Manuel; Raffaella	Ainett; Aldo; Alex; Carmen; Davide; Manuel; Raffaella; ~~Samy~~	Aldo; Alex; Francesca; Katia; Manila; Manuel	Ainett; Aldo; Alex; Katia; Manila; Manuel; Miriana; ~~Raffaella~~	Carmen; Manila	Katia; Soleil; Sophie	Katia; Miriana	Miriana; Soleil; Sophie	none	Aldo; Manila; Manuel	Aldo; Alex; Carmen; Giucas; Katia; Manila; Manuel	Aldo; Giucas; Katia; Manila; Manuel; The Selassiés	Nominations received
Favorites of the Opinionists	none	Soleil; The Selassiés	Jo; Sophie	Katia; Soleil	Soleil; Sophie	Gianmaria; Soleil	Katia; Soleil	Davide; Nicola	Nicola; Soleil	Francesca; The Selassiés	The Selassiés	Manila	Katia	none	Davide; Giucas	Francesca	Miriana	Nominations received
Jessica	Francesca	Amedeo	Exempt	Samy	Andrea	Nicola	Nicola	Raffaella	Amedeo	Raffaella	Miriana	Jo	Francesca	Saved	Gianmaria	Soleil	Alex	
Davide	Not in House	Exempt	Nicola	Andrea	Andrea	Francesca	The Selassiés	Raffaella	Francesca	Raffaella	Ainett	Ainett	Ainett	Katia to save	Francesca	Sophie	Gianmaria	
Lulù	Francesca	Amedeo	Exempt	Samy	Andrea	Nicola	Nicola	Raffaella	Amedeo	Raffaella	Miriana	Jo	Francesca	Saved	Gianmaria	Soleil	Alex	
Giucas	Not in House	Exempt	Nicola	Amedeo	Andrea	Amedeo	Amedeo	Amedeo	Amedeo	Miriana	Miriana	Soleil	Ainett	Francesca to save	Gianmaria	Miriana	Gianmaria	
Sophie	Not in House	Exempt	Davide	Gianmaria	Andrea	Amedeo	Amedeo	Jo	Amedeo	Soleil	Francesca	Soleil	Francesca	Saved	Soleil	Soleil	Gianmaria	
Manila	The Selassiés	Tommaso	Exempt	Miriana	Andrea	Amedeo	Amedeo	Gianmaria	Amedeo	Raffaella	Carmen	Carmen	The Selassiés	Saved	Sophie	Nicola	Alex	
Soleil	Raffaella	Tommaso	Exempt	Gianmaria	The Selassiés	Samy	The Selassiés	Miriana	Gianmaria	Sophie	Ainett	Sophie	The Selassiés	Saved	Sophie	Jo	Gianmaria	
Miriana	Not in House	Exempt	Nicola	Amedeo	Raffaella	Amedeo	Giucas	Raffaella	Amedeo	Raffaella	Francesca	Carmen	Francesca	Saved	Francesca	Sophie	Soleil	
Katia	Manila	Raffaella	Exempt	Gianmaria	Andrea	Davide	Nicola	Raffaella	Gianmaria	Jo	Carmen	Jo	Jo	Saved	Francesca	Nicola	Gianmaria	
Gianmaria	Exempt	Francesca	Davide	Nicola	Raffaella	Nicola	Nicola	Raffaella	Jo	Soleil	Manila	Francesca	Francesca	Sophie to save	Soleil	Jo	Alex	
Manuel	Exempt	Ainett	Andrea	Miriana	Andrea	Miriana	Miriana	Miriana	Amedeo	Miriana	Miriana	Carmen	Ainett	Jo to save	Miriana	Miriana	Carmen	
Carmen	The Selassiés	Tommaso	Exempt	Gianmaria	Nicola	Davide	Amedeo	Gianmaria	Amedeo	Ainett	Miriana	Ainett	Manila	Nominated	Nicola	Soleil	Alex	
Aldo	Exempt	Raffaella	Andrea	Temporarily; Left		Giucas	Nicola	Soleil	Davide	Soleil	Miriana	Soleil	Jo	Manila to save	Soleil	Soleil	Alex	
Francesca	The Selassiés	Tommaso	Exempt	Davide	Davide	Davide	Miriana	Gianmaria	Davide	Soleil	Miriana	Sophie	Jo	Saved	Gianmaria	Nicola	Gianmaria	
Alex	Exempt	Ainett	Exempt	Andrea	Andrea	Samy	Miriana	Ainett	Gianmaria	Raffaella	Ainett	Ainett	Ainett	Soleil to save	Gianmaria	Jo	Gianmaria	
Clarissa	Francesca	Amedeo	Exempt	Samy	Andrea	Nicola	Nicola	Raffaella	Amedeo	Raffaella	Miriana	Jo	Francesca	Saved	Gianmaria	Soleil	Alex	
Nicola	Not in House	Exempt	Davide	Ainett	Samy	Carmen	The Selassiés	Ainett	Carmen	Raffaella	Carmen	Carmen	Ainett	Miriana to save	Francesca	Davide	Gianmaria	
Jo	Not in House	Exempt	Davide	Nicola	Nicola	Amedeo	Amedeo	Gianmaria	Amedeo	Sophie	Francesca	Francesca	Francesca	Saved	Gianmaria	Soleil	Evicted (Day 54)	11
Ainett	The Selassiés	Tommaso	Exempt	Miriana	Nicola	Davide	Nicola	Raffaella	Davide	Soleil	Carmen	Carmen	Jo	The Selassiés to save	Evicted (Day 47)			17
Raffaella	Manila	Tommaso	Davide	Miriana	Nicola	Davide	Miriana	Miriana	Davide	Soleil	Miriana	Evicted (Day 40)						17
Amedeo	Exempt	Francesca	Exempt	Andrea	Andrea	Davide	Giucas	Sophie	Davide	Evicted (Day 33)								22
Samy	Not in House	Exempt	Davide	Nicola	Nicola	Davide	Nicola	Evicted (Day 26)										4
Andrea	Not in House	Exempt	Davide	Davide	Davide	Evicted (Day 19)												14
Tommaso	Exempt	Francesca	Nominated	Evicted (Day 12)														6
Notes	1	2	3, 4	5, 6	7	8, 9	10	11, 12	13	14, 15, 16	14, 17	14, 18, 19	14	20				
Nominated	none	Francesca; Tommaso	Davide; Tommaso	Andrea; Gianmaria; Miriana; Nicola	Andrea; Gianmaria; Nicola	Amedeo; Davide; Nicola; Samy	Amedeo; Nicola; Samy	Gianmaria; Miriana; Raffaella	Amedeo; Davide; Raffaella	Miriana; Raffaella; Soleil; Sophie	Carmen; Miriana; Raffaella	Ainett; Carmen; Soleil	Ainett; Carmen; Francesca	Carmen; Francesca; Gianmaria		Gianmaria; Jo; Nicola; Soleil	Alex; Carmen; Davide; Gianmaria; Soleil	
Evicted	The Selassiés; 4 of 8 votes to face the consequence	Tommaso; 16.5% to save	Tommaso; 27.6% to save	Miriana; 33.41% to be immune	Andrea; 24.0% to save	Davide; 43.2% to be immune	Samy; 18.1% to save	Miriana; 46.5% to be immune	Amedeo; 15.2% to save	Soleil; 42.9% to be immune	Raffaella; 23.1% to save	Soleil; 51.1% to be immune	Ainett; 24.9% to save	Carmen; 44.8% to be immune		Jo; 17.5% to save	Soleil; 35.9% to be immune	
Saved	none	Francesca; 83.5%	Davide; 72.4%	Gianmaria; 32.95% Nicola; 19.94% Andrea; 13.70%	Gianmaria; 43.0% Nicola; 33.0%	Nicola; 30.0% Samy; 17.7% Amedeo; 9.1%	Nicola; 62.5% Amedeo; 19.4%	Gianmaria; 30.7% Raffaella; 22.8%	Davide; 57.4% Raffaella; 27.4%	Miriana; 22.3% Sophie; 21.2% Raffaella; 13.6%	Miriana; 43.4% Carmen; 33.5%	Carmen; 27.3% Ainett; 21.6%	Carmen; 45.7% Francesca; 29.4%	Francesca; 29.3% Gianmaria; 25.9%		Soleil; 40.2% Gianmaria; 21.8% Nicola; 20.5%	Carmen; 25.0% Gianmaria; 22.1% Davide; 12.5% Alex; 4.5%	

=== Week 9 - Week 18 ===
3-in-1 housemate called 'The Selassiés', their nominations counted as one (Week 1 - 10).
The contestant is immune.

	Week 9		Week 10		Week 11		Week 12		Week 13		Week 14		Week 15	Week 16	Week 17		Week 18		Nominations received
	Day 57	Day 61	Day 64	Day 68	Day 71	Day 75	Day 78	Day 82	Day 85	Day 89	Day 92	Day 96	Week 15	Week 16	Day 113	Day 117	Day 120	Day 124	Nominations received
Favorites of the House	Aldo; Katia; Manila; Manuel; Soleil; The Selassiés	Aldo; Alex; Giucas; Manuel; Miriana	Aldo; Francesca; Giucas; Manuel; Soleil	Aldo; Giucas; Katia; Manuel	none	Katia; Miriana	Katia; Manila; Manuel	Gianmaria; Katia; Manila	Aldo; Katia; Giacomo & Valeria	Aldo; Giucas; Soleil	none	Jessica; Katia; Sophie	Jessica; Katia; Lulù; Sophie	Jessica; Katia; Lulù; Manila	Alessandro; Davide; Giucas; Katia; Manila	Alessandro; Gianmaria; Jessica; Katia; Lulù		Katia; Manila; Manuel; Soleil	Nominations received
Favorites of the Opinionists	Alex	Gianmaria	Alex	Sophie	Soleil	Francesca	Davide; Miriana	Alex; Maria	Gianmaria; Lulù	Giacomo & Valeria; Katia	none	Giucas; Soleil	Carmen	Giacomo & Valeria; Nathaly	Barù	none		Davide; Nathaly	Nominations received
Jessica	Nicola	Manila	Davide	Davide	Sophie	Manila	Gianmaria	Manuel	Maria	Maria	No; Nominations	Miriana	Giacomo & Valeria	Alessandro	Soleil	Lulù to be immune	Soleil	Giacomo & Valeria	
Davide	Nicola	The Selassiés	The Selassiés	Francesca	Miriana	Lulù	Lulù	Lulù	Maria	Maria	No; Nominations	Lulù	Giacomo & Valeria	Eva	Nathaly	Katia to be immune	Federica	Federica	
Barù	Not in House												Exempt	Miriana	Nathaly	Davide to be immune	Federica	Sophie	
Delia	Not in House																	Exempt	
Lulù	Nicola	Manila	Davide	Davide	No; Nomination	Manila	Alex	Aldo	Maria	Maria	No; Nominations	Biagio	Davide	Davide	Soleil	Jessica to be immune	Soleil	Giacomo & Valeria	
Giucas	Nicola	Davide	Gianmaria	Gianmaria	Miriana	Clarissa	Patrizia	Jessica	Maria	Maria	No; Nominations	Biagio	Gianmaria	Barù	Nathaly	Katia to be immune	Manila	Federica	
Sophie	Nicola	Soleil	Manila	Manila	Katia	Manila	Gianmaria	Carmen	Maria	Maria	No; Nominations	Biagio	Davide	Barù	Soleil	Alessandro to be immune	Manuel	Kabir	
Manila	Nicola	Sophie	The Selassiés	Carmen	Carmen	Sophie	Jessica	Jessica	Maria	Maria	No; Nominations	Biagio	Giucas	Giucas	Jessica	Katia to be immune	Federica	Federica	
Soleil	Miriana	Sophie	Gianmaria	Gianmaria	Sophie	Sophie	Patrizia	Miriana	Miriana	Gianmaria	No; Nominations	Miriana	Miriana	Miriana	Gianmaria	Katia to be immune	Miriana	Miriana	
Miriana	Nicola	Soleil	Davide	Evicted (Day 68)	Katia	Soleil	Soleil	Soleil	Soleil	Maria	No; Nominations	Manuel	Soleil	Barù	Soleil	Jessica to be immune	Soleil	Giacomo & Valeria	
Alessandro	Not in House											Exempt		Eva	Lulù	Gianmaria to be immune	Federica	Kabir	
Nathaly	Not in House												Exempt	Davide	Carmen	Gianmaria to be immune	Manila	Giacomo & Valeria	
Katia	Nicola	Sophie	Miriana	Soleil	Sophie	Lulù	Jessica	Jessica	Maria	Maria	No; Nominations	Biagio	Miriana	Federica	Nathaly	Manila to be immune	Federica	Federica	
Kabir	Not in House														Exempt			Gianmaria	
Gianmaria	Davide	Sophie	Carmen	Soleil	Carmen	Soleil	Lulù	Jessica	Maria	Maria	No; Nominations	Carmen	Giacomo & Valeria	Alessandro	Giacomo & Valeria	Alessandro to be immune	Soleil	Kabir	
Federica	Not in House											Exempt		Alessandro	Carmen	Nathaly to be immune	No; Nomination	Kabir	
Manuel	Carmen	The Selassiés	Miriana	Carmen	Carmen	Clarissa	Lulù	Lulù	Maria	Miriana	No; Nominations	Miriana	Miriana	Eva	Soleil	Lulù to be immune	Soleil	Federica	
Giacomo & Valeria	Not in House						Exempt		Biagio	Maria	No; Nominations	Gianmaria	Miriana	Alessandro	Miriana	Katia to be immune	Davide	Federica	
Carmen	Nicola	Sophie	Gianmaria	Gianmaria	Miriana	Manila	Maria	Lulù	Maria	Maria	No; Nominations	Biagio	Gianmaria	Federica	Nathaly	Giacomo & Valeria to be immune	Federica	Evicted (Day 124)	25
Eva	Not in House											Exempt		Federica	Evicted (Day 113)				3
Biagio	Not in House						Exempt		Maria	Maria	No; Nominations	Giacomo & Valeria	Manila	Evicted (Day 106)					7
Aldo	Davide	Soleil	Miriana	Soleil	Miriana	Soleil	Lulù	Lulù	Maria	Maria	No; Nominations	Walked (Day 96)							1
Francesca	Nicola	Davide	Gianmaria	Gianmaria	Katia	Clarissa	Jessica	Sophie	Jessica	Maria	Walked (Day 92)								23
Alex	Miriana	The Selassiés	Miriana	Gianmaria	Carmen	Lulù	Patrizia	Lulù	Maria	Francesca	Ejected (Day 92)								6
Maria	Not in House				Exempt		Gianmaria	Lulù	Sophie	Carmen	Evicted (Day 92)								29
Patrizia	Not in House				Exempt		Maria	Giucas	Evicted (Day 85)										3
Clarissa	Nicola	Manila	Davide	Davide	Francesca	Manila	Evicted (Day 78)												18
Nicola	Miriana	Evicted (Day 61)																	32
Notes				21	22, 23						24, 25, 26					27	28		
Nominated	Gianmaria; Miriana; Nicola	Soleil; Sophie; The Selassiés	Gianmaria; Miriana; Sophie	Carmen; Gianmaria; Soleil	Carmen; Katia; Miriana; Sophie	Carmen; Clarissa; Lulù; Manila; Soleil	Gianmaria; Jessica; Lulù; Patrizia	Jessica; Lulù; Patrizia	Biagio; Jessica; Maria; Miriana; Soleil; Sophie	Carmen; Francesca; Gianmaria; Maria; Miriana; Sophie	Nominations cancelled	Biagio; Carmen; Giacomo & Valeria; Gianmaria; Lulù; Manuel; Miriana	Biagio; Giacomo & Valeria; Miriana	Alessandro; Barù; Eva; Federica	Carmen; Nathaly; Soleil		Carmen; Federica; Soleil	Federica; Giacomo & Valeria; Kabir	
Evicted	Nicola; 31.5% to save	Soleil; 47.4% to be immune	Miriana; 29.0% to save	Soleil; 44.1% to be immune	Miriana; 37.0% to be immune	Clarissa; 15.4% to save	Gianmaria; 38.9% to be immune	Patrizia; 29.4% to save	Soleil; 29.6% to be immune	Maria; 13.5% to save	Nominations cancelled	Lulù; 26.2% to be immune	Biagio; 20.2% to save	Eva; 21.9% to save	Nathaly; 63.4% to be immune		Carmen; 22.0% to save	Kabir; 40.3% to be immune	
Saved	Miriana; 36.1% Gianmaria; 32.4%	The Selassiés; 31.2% Sophie; 21.4%	Gianmaria; 37.8% Sophie; 33.2%	Gianmaria; 34.1% Carmen; 21.8%	Sophie; 26.7% Carmen; 19.8% Katia; 16.5%	Soleil; 30.2% Manila; 20.2% Carmen; 18.0% Lulù; 16.2%	Jessica; 27.1% Lulù; 27.0% Patrizia; 7.0%	Lulù; 35.3% Jessica; 35.3%	Jessica; 27.4% Miriana; 17.5% Sophie; 17.0% Biagio; 5.1% Maria; 3.4%	Sophie; 23.4% Miriana; 18.9% Gianmaria; 16.6% Carmen; 14.0% Francesca; 13.6%	Nominations cancelled	Miriana; 16.9% Gianmaria; 16.8% Manuel; 16.5% Carmen; 9.7% Giacomo & Valeria; 8.0% Biagio; 5.9%	Miriana; 41.7% Giacomo & Valeria; 38.1%	Barù; 28.7% Federica; 26.8% Alessandro; 22.6%	Soleil; 22.5% Carmen; 14.1%		Soleil; 43.3% Federica; 34.7%	Federica; 33.3% Giacomo & Valeria; 26.4%	
Walked	none										Francesca	Aldo	none						
Ejected	none										Alex	none							

=== Week 19 - Finale ===
The contestant is immune.
Housemate nominated by Grande Fratello as a disciplinary measure.

	Week 19		Week 20		Week 21	Week 22	Week 23		Week 24		Week 25				Week 26				Final				Nominations received
	Day 127	Day 131	Day 134	Day 138	Week 21	Week 22	Day 155	Day 158	Day 162	Day 165	Day 169		Day 172		Day 176		Day 179		Final				Nominations received
Favorites of the House	Alessandro; Barù; Kabir; Manuel	Barù; Katia; Lulù; Manila	Katia; Manila; Sophie	none		Barù; Jessica; Katia	none																Nominations received
Favorites of the Opinionists	Giucas; Soleil	Jessica; Sophie	Delia; Soleil	none		Nathaly; Soleil	none																Nominations received
Jessica	Sophie	Soleil	Barù	Giucas	Lulù to be finalist	Gianluca	Lulù to be finalist	Nathaly	Nathaly	Nathaly	Sophie to save	Giucas	Miriana to save	Davide	Soleil to be finalist	Manila	Saved	Nominated	Exempt	Nominated	Nominated	Winner (Day 183)	31
Davide	Nathaly	Federica	Lulù	Delia	Katia to be finalist	Antonio	Katia to be finalist	Nathaly	Nathaly	Nathaly	Barù to save	Antonio	Giucas to save Antonio	Sophie	Soleil to be finalist	Jessica	Giucas to save	Finalist	Lulù	Exempt	Nominated	Runner-up (Day 183)	49
Barù	Lulù	Delia	Miriana	Delia	Davide to be finalist	Antonio	Davide to be finalist	Nathaly	Nathaly	Nathaly	Manila to save	Antonio	Jessica to save	Miriana	Davide to be finalist	Manila	Sophie	Finalist	Davide	Exempt	Nominated	Third Place (Day 183)	13
Delia	Exempt	Alessandro	Nathaly	Soleil	Manila to be finalist	Gianluca	Manila to be finalist	Barù	Soleil	Miriana	Exempt	Miriana	Exempt	Miriana	Exempt	Barù	Jessica to save	Finalist	Exempt	Nominated	Fourth Place (Day 183)		8
Lulù	Davide	Soleil	Barù	Giucas	Jessica to be finalist	Kabir	Jessica to be finalist	Nathaly	Katia	Nathaly	Exempt	Davide	Exempt	Davide	Exempt	Giucas	Sophie to save	Finalist	Nominated	Fifth Place (Day 183)			32
Giucas	Nathaly	Nathaly	Nathaly	Nathaly	Katia to be finalist	No; Nomination	Soleil to be finalist	Antonio	Antonio	Nathaly	Davide to save	Antonio	Barù to save	Jessica	Davide to be finalist	Manila	Saved	Nominated	Evicted (Day 183)				14
Sophie	Jessica	Gianmaria	Gianmaria	Delia	Alessandro to be finalist	Antonio	Alessandro to be finalist	Kabir	Antonio	Nathaly	Alessandro to save	Antonio	Davide	Miriana	Giucas to be finalist	Barù	Saved	Evicted (Day 179)					28
Manila	Jessica	Federica	Giucas	Soleil	Miriana to be finalist	Kabir	Lulù to be finalist	Kabir	Katia	Antonio	Saved	Antonio	Saved	Barù	Soleil to be finalist	Barù	Evicted (Day 179)						21
Soleil	Jessica	Delia	Nathaly	Delia	Katia to be finalist	Manila	Barù to be finalist	Miriana	Davide	Davide	Giucas to save	Miriana	Davide to save	Jessica	Sophie to be finalist	Evicted (Day 176)							51
Miriana	Giacomo & Valeria	Soleil	Barù	Katia	Manila to be finalist	Kabir	Lulù to be finalist	Katia	Katia	Soleil	Alessandro	Antonio	Manila to save	Soleil	Evicted (Day 176)								60
Antonio	Not in House			Exempt		Sophie	Nathaly to be finalist	Barù	Davide	Miriana	Sophie	Sophie	Soleil to save	Evicted (Day 172)									16
Alessandro	Giacomo & Valeria	Kabir	Nathaly	Delia	Sophie to be finalist	Antonio	Sophie to be finalist	Nominated	Katia	Antonio	Soleil to save	Evicted (Day 169)											9
Nathaly	Davide	Soleil	Barù	Giucas	Kabir to be finalist	Davide	Miriana to be finalist	Jessica	Davide	Miriana	Evicted (Day 169)												26
Katia	Miriana	Federica	Alessandro	Delia	Davide to be finalist	Giucas	Soleil to be finalist	Sophie	Manila	Evicted (Day 165)													9
Kabir	Gianmaria	Federica	Alessandro	Alessandro	Barù to be finalist	Alessandro	Katia to be finalist	Manila	Evicted (Day 162)														12
Gianluca	Not in House			Exempt		Antonio	Evicted (Day 155)																2
Gianmaria	Giacomo & Valeria	Kabir	Giucas	No; Nomination	Walked (Day 141)																		45
Federica	Davide	Kabir	Davide	Evicted (Day 138)																			19
Manuel	Sophie	No; Nomination	Walked (Day 134)																				3
Giacomo & Valeria	Gianmaria	Evicted (Day 131)																					12
Notes		29		30, 31		32		33			34	35	36		37		38	39	40, 41				
Nominated	Davide; Federica; Giacomo & Valeria; Jessica	Federica; Kabir; Soleil	Barù; Federica; Nathaly	Delia; Giucas; Soleil	Davide; Delia; Katia; Manila	Antonio; Gianluca; Kabir	Katia; Lulù; Soleil	Alessandro; Barù; Kabir; Nathaly	Davide; Katia; Nathaly	Antonio; Miriana; Nathaly	Alessandro; Antonio; Miriana; Sophie	Antonio; Davide; Giucas; Miriana; Sophie	Antonio; Davide; Sophie	Davide; Jessica; Miriana	Davide; Soleil	Barù; Manila	Barù; Sophie	Giucas; Jessica	Davide; Lulù	Delia; Jessica	Barù; Davide; Jessica	Davide; Jessica	
Evicted	Giacomo & Valeria; 14.8% to save	Kabir; 65.5% to be immune	Federica; 13.8% to save	Delia; 52.3% to be immune	Delia; 36.2% to be finalist	Gianluca; 16.0% to save	Lulù; 57.0% to be finalist	Kabir; 13.1% to save	Katia; 23.6% to save	Nathaly; 19.3% to save	Alessandro; 11.1% to save	Giucas; 13.5% to save	Antonio; 25.7% to save	Miriana; 25.3% to save	Soleil; 42.4% to be finalist	Manila; 38.2% to save	Sophie; 38.9% to be finalist	Giucas; 30.0% to be finalist	Lulù; 39.0% to save	Delia; 26.6% to save	Barù; 9.1% to win	Davide; 37.9% to win	
Saved	Jessica; 40.8% Davide; 24.5% Federica; 19.9%	Soleil; 24.5% Federica; 10.0%	Barù; 53.4% Nathaly; 32.8%	Soleil; 35.5% Giucas; 12.2%	Davide; 32.7% Manila; 27.2% Katia; 3.9%	Kabir; 51.0% Antonio; 33.0%	Soleil; 40.0% Katia; 3.0%	Barù; 44.8% Nathaly; 21.5% Alessandro; 20.6%	Davide; 50.4% Nathaly; 26.0%	Miriana; 50.8% Antonio; 29.9%	Antonio; 40.6% Miriana; 32.0% Sophie; 16.3%	Miriana; 28.7% Antonio; 23.8% Sophie; 19.5% Davide; 14.5%	Sophie; 43.7% Davide; 30.6%	Jessica; 45.2% Davide; 29.5%	Davide; 57.6% to be finalist	Barù; 61.8%	Barù; 61.1% to be finalist	Jessica; 70.0% to be finalist	Davide; 61.0%	Jessica; 73.4%	Jessica; 57.1% Davide; 33.8%	Jessica; 62.1% to win	
Walked	none		Manuel	none	Gianmaria	none																	

=== Notes ===
- ^Note 1 : On Day 1, only female housemates could vote for another female houseguest based on first impressions. Clarissa, Jessica & Lucrezia (The Selassiés) ended up having the most votes, therefore they had to face the consequence: spend the night in the beaten-down section of the house. They also had to pick a male houseguest to join them, they chose Alex.
- ^Note 2 : On Day 5, only housemates that had entered the House on Day 1 could vote for another houseguest. Furthermore, two ways to get immunity were introduced: the recurring 'Favorites of the House' immunity, given to the houseguests that received more positive votes during the previous days, and the brand new 'Favorites of the Opinionists' immunity, given by Adriana Volpe and Sonia Bruganelli to one houseguest each.
- ^Note 3 : The public did not vote to evict a housemate but the one who received the fewest votes would be the first nominated on Day 8. Tommaso received the fewest votes, therefore being the first nominated for the next nomination, and face the public vote with Davide.
- ^Note 4 : On Day 8, only housemates that had entered the House on Day 5 could vote for another houseguest. However, each of the 4 housemates that entered on Day 5 but was not given immunity (either by the House or by the Opinionists) had to pick a contestant that entered the House on Day 1 to give them the right to vote, while everyone else would be exempted. Andrea chose Gianmaria, Davide chose Manuel, Nicola chose Aldo, Samy chose Raffaella.
- ^Note 5 : Alex, Carmen, The Selassiés, Jo, Manila, Manuel, Raffaella were immuned since they are voted as the favorite of the week, while Katia and Soleil were immuned as the favorites of the opinionists. Immuned housemates nominated in confessional, and the housemates at risk for being nominated nominate in public.
- ^Note 6 : The public did not vote to evict a housemate but the one who received the most vote will receive a secret advantage on Day 15.
- ^Note 7 : As the most voted housemate by the public, Miriana was immune and had to pick one of the other three (Andrea, Gianmaria, and Nicola) to be nominated. She chose Gianmaria.
- ^Note 8 : Ainett, Alex, Jo, Katia, Manila, Manuel, Raffaella were immuned since they are voted as the favorite of the week, while Gianmaria and Soleil were immuned as the favorites of the opinionists. Immuned housemates nominated in confessional, and the housemates at risk for being nominated nominate in public.
- ^Note 9 : The public did not vote to evict a housemate but the one who received the most vote will receive a secret advantage on Day 22.
- ^Note 10 : As the most voted housemate by the public, Davide was immune and had to pick one of the other three (Amedeo, Nicola, and Samy) to be nominated. He chose Samy.
- ^Note 11 : Aldo, Alex Francesca, Katia, Manila, Manuel were immuned since they are voted as the favorite of the week, while Davide and Nicola were immuned as the favorites of the opinionists. Immuned housemates nominated in confessional, and the housemates at risk for being nominated nominate in public.
- ^Note 12 : The public did not vote to evict a housemate but the one who received the most vote will receive a secret advantage on Day 29.
- ^Note 13 : As the most voted housemate by the public, Miriana was immune and had to pick one of the other two (Gianmaria and Raffaella) to be nominated. She chose Raffaella.
- ^Note 14 : As the first four housemates were all men, the remaining male housemates were given immunity, and only the female housemates could be nominated.
- ^Note 15 : Carmen and Manila were immuned since they are voted as the favorite of the week, while The Selassiés and Francesca were immuned as the favorites of the opinionists. Male housemate nominated in confessional, and the female housemates at risk for being nominated nominate in public.
- ^Note 16 : The public did not vote to evict a housemate but the one who received the most vote will receive a secret advantage on Day 36.
- ^Note 17 : As the most voted housemate by the public, Soleil was immune and had to pick one of the other three (Miriana, Raffaella, and Sophie) to be nominated. She chose Raffaella.
- ^Note 18 : Katia and Miriana were immuned since they are voted as the favorite of the week, while Manila was immuned as the favorite of the opinionists. Male housemates nominated in confessional, and the female housemates were at risk for being nominated nominate in public.
- ^Note 19 : The public did not vote to evict a housemate but the one who received the most vote will receive a secret advantage on Day 43.
- ^Note 20 : The nominees were chosen in two different steps: first, the male housemates (plus the latest evicted contestant, Ainett) had to save one female housemate each through a saving chain (going alphabetically). Carmen was the last woman standing as she was not saved, and she became the first nominee.
- ^Note 21 : Miriana was evicted by the public, but she was revealed to have picked the Return Ticket for the women, therefore she went back into the House, skipping the nomination round.
- ^Note 22 : Soleil was voted as the favorite by the public, and she had the choice to either keep immunity for herself or give it to another female housemate (as only the women could be nominated), she decided to give her immunity to Manila.
- ^Note 23 : During the public nominations, Lulù hadn't picked a nomination card during the designated time period, therefore she was not allowed to vote.
- ^Note 24 : For not respecting the containment provisions for COVID-19, Alex is ejected from the House.
- ^Note 25 : Due to Alex's ejection and the remaining houseguests having to decide whether they wanted to continue their journey in the game, nominations were canceled.
- ^Note 26 : The houseguests that entered the House on either Day 1 or Day 5, after being informed that the season would end in March on Day 89, had to decide whether they wanted to continue to compete or leave the House. Carmen, Francesca, Gianmaria, Giucas, Katia, Lulù, Manuel, and Miriana all had to state their decisions on Day 92, while Aldo, Davide, Jessica, Manila, Soleil, and Sophie on Day 96.
- ^Note 27 : On Day 117, as there was not originally supposed to be a live show, the public vote was not closed and there was no nomination. Instead, the contestants had to pick one person publicly to be the Favorite of the House, rather than the usual mechanism of voting privately in the confessional. The most voted contestants would become the Favorites of the House for the following nomination round, on Day 120.
- ^Note 28 : Federica nominated Carmen as she didn't realize the latter had already been chosen to face the public vote by Nathaly, so her nomination was deemed null.
- ^Note 29 : Manuel had been considering abandoning the game for a few days, therefore he was exempt from nominations while finalizing his decisions or whether or not he would stay.
- ^Note 30 : Similarly to Manuel, Gianmaria had been considering abandoning the game for a few days, therefore he was exempt from nominations while finalizing his decisions or whether or not he would stay.
- ^Note 31 : The contestants that received the most votes from the public became the first candidate for a spot in the finals.
- ^Note 32 : During the public nominations, Giucas hadn't picked a nomination card during the designated time period, therefore he was not allowed to vote.
- ^Note 33 : Due to his aggressive behavior towards some of his fellow housemates and breaking the rules of the game by refusing to wear a microphone multiple times, Alessandro was punished and was automatically nominated for eviction.
- ^Note 34 : On Day 169 there was a second eviction, with the following mechanism: the contestants (excluding the finalists) were called in alphabetical order to pick a pyramid-shape (the confessional wall pieces), with one of the pyramids having a golden bottom. Jessica picked the lucky pyramid and started a saving chain in which two houseguests would be left unsaved and would go to a public vote. The two houseguests were Antonio and Miriana. The two then had the chance to get their 'revenge' by picking one person each to join them in the public vote, for a total of four contestants up for eviction. Antonio picked Sophie while Miriana picked Alessandro.
- ^Note 35 : Giucas was evicted by the public, but he was revealed to have picked the Return Ticket for the men, therefore he went back into the House.
- ^Note 36 : On Day 172 there was a second eviction, with the following mechanism: the contestants (excluding the finalists) were called in alphabetical order to pick a pyramid-shape (the confessional wall pieces), with one of the pyramids having a golden bottom. Antonio picked the lucky pyramid and started a saving chain in which one houseguest would be left unsaved and would go to a public vote. The houseguest was Sophie, who then had the chance to get her 'revenge' by picking one person to join her in the public vote, picking Davide. Davide then also had the chance to pick another person to join them, for a total of three contestants up for eviction. He picked Antonio.
- ^Note 37 : On Day 176 there was a second eviction, which simultaneously lead to the election of the third finalist. The contestants (except the previously named two finalists) were informed that they had to vote for one person to potentially become the new finalist, but that the public vote would lead to the eviction of the contestant that received the fewest votes. Because of this, while the nomination was technically 'to be finalist', the contestants could strategically vote for the person they wanted to evict.
- ^Note 38 : On Day 179 there was a second eviction, which simultaneously lead to the election of the fourth finalist. The previously named three finalists each had to pick one contestant among the other four to save (Delia went first as she was named the first finalist, then Lulù and finally Davide). The only contestant that was not saved, Barù, was automatically nominated and had to pick someone to join him in the public vote: he chose Sophie. The contestants were not aware while making their decisions that the public vote would also lead to the election of the fourth finalist, and were only told that the mechanism would cause an eviction.
- ^Note 39 : As the only two houseguests that had not yet been voted as finalists by the public, Giucas and Jessica were automatically nominated. While the results of the vote would be known on Day 183, the day of the finale, only the winner would actually be considered a finalist, while the loser would be the last evictee before the official start of the final.
- ^Note 40 : Once the five finalists were named, they each had to pick a pyramid-shaped confessional piece: the lucky contestant to pick the one with a golden bottom would be safe from the first two audience votes, directly reaching the Final 3. Barù picked the gold piece. Together with safety, Barù also had the duty of picking one of the other finalists: this person would be able to choose who to challenge in the first public vote duel: Barù chose Davide, who in turn chose Lulù, leaving Delia and Jessica to face off in the second duel.
- ^Note 41 : After Davide and Jessica won their respective public votes, they joined Barù and the final three was formed. A public vote with all three contestants was opened, and when it ended the housemate with the fewest votes (Barù) was eliminated. After that, a new public vote was opened, involving only the final two houseguests, where the votes accumulated in the previous vote were summed with the ones from the new one.

== TV Ratings and guests ==
Live shows

Week	Episode	Date	Viewers	Share	Guest
1	1	September 13, 2021	2,860,000	20.70%	Tommaso Zorzi
1	2	September 17, 2021	2,001,000	14.70%	Franco Bortuzzo
2	3	September 20, 2021	2,578,000	17.50%	Enzo Paolo Turchi
2	4	September 24, 2021	2,297,000	15.80%	Guenda Goria, Valentina Nulli Augusti
3	5	September 27, 2021	2,828,000	19.20%	Greta Giulia Mastroianni, Valentina Nulli Augusti, Valeria Pasciuti
3	6	October 1, 2021	2,487,000	16.90%	Patrizia Mirigiliani, Piero Neri
4	7	October 4, 2021	3,131,000	21.60%	Alessandro Rossi
4	8	October 8, 2021	2,641,000	17.00%	Maria Teresa Ruta
5	9	October 11, 2021	3,181,000	20.70%	Pacifico "Pago" Settembre, Vera Miales
5	10	October 15, 2021	2,449,000	15.70%	Filippo Magnini, Guenda Goria, Massimiliano Rosolino, Mirko Gancitano, Vera Miales
6	11	October 18, 2021	2,967,000	19.00%	Olga Plachina
6	12	October 22, 2021	2,678,000	18.20%	Paolo Bonolis
7	13	October 25, 2021	3,013,000	20.40%	Francesco Perillo, Patrizia Mirigiliani
7	14	October 29, 2021	2,630,000	17.20%	Ernest Sifontes, Michelle Masullo, Yinel Sifontes
8	15	November 1, 2021	2,811,000	18.90%	Iva Zanicchi, Stefano Codegoni
8	16	November 5, 2021	3,098,000	19.61%	Delia Duran, Iva Zanicchi
9	17	November 8, 2021	3,239,000	21.30%	Lorenzo Amoruso, Orietta Berti
9	18	November 12, 2021	3,102,000	19.33%	Delia Duran
10	19	November 15, 2021	3,103,000	19.00%	James Casella, Mara Venier, Mirko Gancitano
10	20	November 19, 2021	2,717,000	17.70%	Alberta Antinolfi
11	21	November 22, 2021	3,138,000	20.60%	Alessandro Rossi, Lorenzo Amoruso
11	22	November 26, 2021	2,915,000	19.30%	Delia Duran, Rita De Michele
12	23	November 29, 2021	3,266,000	21.48%	Nicolas Marselli, Patrizia De Blanck
12	24	December 3, 2021	2,945,000	19.06%	Teresa Nazzaro
13	25	December 6, 2021	3,414,000	22.60%	Enzo Paolo Turchi, Olga Plachina
13	26	December 10, 2021	2,979,000	19.20%	Kekko Silvestre
14	27	December 13, 2021	3,694,000	23.50%	Delia Duran
14	28	December 17, 2021	2,989,000	19.60%	Alessandro Rossi
15	29	December 20, 2021	3,017,000	20.30%	Franco Bortuzzo, Wendy Kay
16	30	December 27, 2021	3,423,000	21.50%	Christian Hailé Selassié
17	31	January 3, 2022	3,322,000	21.10%	Imma Battaglia
17	32	January 7, 2022	3,459,000	21.00%	Dayane Mello, Kevin Bortuzzo
18	33	January 10, 2022	3,375,000	21.38%	Enzo Paolo Turchi, Valeria Perilli
18	34	January 14, 2022	3,343,000	20.80%	Esmeralda Vetromile
19	35	January 17, 2022	3,230,000	21.36%	Leontine Snell, Parveen Dosanjh, Pupi Avati, Valeria Pasciuti
19	36	January 21, 2022	3,373,000	20.60%	Lorenzo Amoruso
20	37	January 24, 2022	3,719,000	23.60%	Andrea Silvestri, Antonio Silvestri, Franco, Jennifer and Kevin Bortuzzo, Rossella Corona
20	38	January 28, 2022	3,448,000	21.80%	Daniela Sorge
21	39	January 31, 2022	3,581,000	23.00%	Alberta Antinolfi, Esmeralda Vetromile, Francesco Perillo
22	40	February 7, 2022	3,269,000	21.50%	Claudio Napolitano, Giorgia Nicole Basciano, Mia Sangiuliano
23	41	February 14, 2022	3,347,000	22.55%	Andrea Ippoliti, Clizia Incorvaia, Paolo Ciavarro
23	42	February 17, 2022	2,990,000	19.18%	Riccardo Pasciuti
24	43	February 21, 2022	3,551,000	22.87%	Fedra Gaetani Dell'Aquila D'Aragona
24	44	February 24, 2022	3,095,000	20.10%	Juliana Silvestri
25	45	February 28, 2022	3,539,000	23.00%	Clementina Deriu, Nicolò Basciano
25	46	March 3, 2022	2,797,000	17.40%	Valeria Graci
26	47	March 7, 2022	3,551,000	24.25%	Nicola Settembre, Pacifico "Pago" Settembre
26	Semifinal	March 10, 2022	3,169,000	20.50%	Enzo Paolo Turchi
27	Final	March 14, 2022	3,659,000	26.06%	Ana Pérez, Andrea Silvestri, Barbara D'Urso, Gaia Zorzi, Giulia Salemi, Ilary Blasi, James Casella, Pina Silvestri, Valeria Pasciuti
Average			3,090,000	20.20%	
