= Ivana Mrázová =

Czech-born Italian model and television personality

- Born: Ivana Mrázová; 1 July 1992 (age 34); Vimperk, Czechoslovakia
- Occupations: Model; television personality
- Partner: Luca Onestini

Ivana Mrázová (born 1 July 1992) is a Czech-born Italian model and television personality.

== Biography ==
Ivana Mrázová was born on 1 July 1992 in Vimperk in what is now the Czech Republic.

At the age of fifteen, she left her hometown to start a modeling career in Milan with the 2morrow Model agency. After having paraded for Italian and European haute couture, in 2012 she made her TV debut as Gianni Morandi's valet at the Sanremo Festival. In February, during the Milan fashion week, she closed the Rocco Barocco fashion show and was chosen as testimonial for various brands such as Cotton Club and Katia G.

In autumn 2017, she participated as a competitor in the second edition of Grande Fratello VIP, broadcast on Canale 5 with the conduction of Ilary Blasi, where she finished third, behind the former tronista Luca Onestini and the winner Daniele Bossari. In 2018, she joined Nicola Savino, Katia Follesa and Cristiano Malgioglio in the new Italia 1 90 Special programme. In the same year, Tata Italia, for P / E 2018, chose her as her new testimonial.

== Television programs ==
Year	Title	Network	Role
2012	62º Festival di Sanremo	Rai 1	Co-Conductor
2017	Grande Fratello VIP 2	Canale 5	Herself / Contestant
2018	90 Special	Italia 1	Co-Conductor
2018	Giù in 60 secondi - Adrenalina ad alta quota	Italia 1	Herself / Contestant
2022	Avanti un altro! Pure di sera	Canale 5	Herself / Contestant
2023	Grande Fratello VIP 7	Canale 5	Guest star

== Web TV ==
Year	Title	Platform	Role	
2012	Casa Chi	361tv	Opinionist	Sent
