= Grande Fratello VIP season 5 =

Grande Fratello VIP
- Season 5
- Presented by: Alfonso Signorini
- No. of days: 169
- No. of housemates: 34
- Winner: Tommaso Zorzi
- Runner-up: Pierpaolo Pretelli

Release
- Original network: Canale 5
- Original release: 14 September 2020 – 1 March 2021

Season chronology
- ← Previous; Season 4 Next → Season 6

Grande Fratello VIP 5 (as known by the acronym GFVIP5) is the fifth celebrity season of the Italian reality television franchise Grande Fratello.

This season was confirmed by Alfonso Signorini on 11 May 2020. It's the second season to air in 2020, and was launched on 14 September on Canale 5.

Alfonso Signorini, again, as presenter of the main show, with season 4 housemate Antonella Elia and the singer Pupo as opinionists.

The live stream is broadcast on Mediaset Extra and Grande Fratello official website, also La 5 broadcast several times per day. Daily recaps are broadcast on Canale 5 and Italia 1. This season also features two live shows per week.

The show was originally scheduled to last 82 days, with the finale on 4 December 2020. However, due to satisfactory ratings, the show was extended by over two months, making it 148 days long and with the finale on 8 February 2021. Due to this season being extended into February 2021, Grande Fratello 17, which was originally planned to air in Spring 2021, would be postponed indefinitely. On 27 November 2020, Mediaset decided to extend the season for another week, making the show 155 days with the finale on 15 February 2021. On December 27, 2020, Mediaset extended the show for the third time by eleven days, making the show 166 days and the finale on 26 February 2021. On 25 January 2021, Alfonso Signorini announced that for the fourth time (and to the discouragement of the original housemates), the show would be extended by three days, with the finale happening on 1 March 2021. In the end, the show lasted 169 days, making it the longest celebrity season at the time, being later surpassed by Grande Fratello VIP 6.

Tommaso Zorzi was announced as the winner of the season.

== Housemates ==
The age of the housemates refers to the time of entry into the house.

Housemates	Age	Birthplace	Famous for...	Day entered	Day exited	Status
Tommaso Zorzi	25	Milan	Influencer, TV Host	1	169	Winner
Pierpaolo Pretelli	30	Maratea	TV personality	1	169	Runner-up
Stefania Orlando	53	Rome	TV host, singer	5	169	3rd Place
Dayane Mello	31	Joinville, Brazil	Model	1	169	4th Place
Andrea Zelletta	27	Taranto	TV personality	1	169	22nd Evicted
Samantha de Grenet	50	Rome	Showgirl, TV host, former model	89	166	21st Evicted
Rosalinda Cannavò	27	Messina	Actress	1	166	20th Evicted
Andrea Zenga	27	Milan	Personal trainer, model, former footballer; son of Walter Zenga	96	162	19th Evicted
Giulia Salemi	27	Piacenza	Showgirl, Grande Fratello VIP season 3 housemate	54	159	18th Evicted
Maria Teresa Ruta	60	Turin	Showgirl and TV host	5	152	17th Evicted
Alda D'Eusanio	70	Tollo	Journalist and TV personality	138	146	Ejected
Carlotta Dell'Isola	27	Anzio	Manager and TV personality	96	141	16th Evicted
Cecilia Capriotti	44	Ascoli Piceno	TV personality, actress and former model	96	127	15th Evicted
Mario Ermito	29	Brindisi	Actor and model, Grande Fratello season 12 housemate	96	120	14th Evicted
Giacomo Urtis	43	Caracas, Venezuela	Medical doctor, singer and TV personality	82	113	13th Evicted
Sonia Lorenzini	31	Asola	Model and influencer	89	106	12th Evicted
Cristiano Malgioglio	75	Ramacca	Singer and TV personality, Grande Fratello VIP season 2 housemate	78	96	11th Evicted
Filippo Nardi	51	London, United Kingdom	Disc jockey and TV host, Grande Fratello season 2 housemate	89	96	Ejected
Selvaggia Roma	31	Rome	Model, influencer and radio speaker	61	89	10th Evicted
Elisabetta Gregoraci	40	Soverato	TV personality and model	5	85	Walked
Francesco Oppini	38	Turin	Sports commentator, son of Alba Parietti and Franco Oppini	5	82	Walked
Enock Barwuah	27	Brescia	Football player, brother of Mario Balotelli	1	78	9th Evicted
Patrizia De Blanck	79	Rome	Countess and TV personality	1	71	8th Evicted
Massimiliano Morra	34	Naples	Actor and former model	1	64	7th Evicted
Paolo Brosio	64	Asti	Writer, journalist and TV host	47	57	6th Evicted
Stefano Bettarini	48	Forlì	Former footballer, Grande Fratello VIP season 1 housemate	54	57	Ejected
Guenda Goria	31	Rome	Theatre actress, daughter of Maria Teresa Ruta	5	47	5th Evicted
Matilde Brandi	51	Rome	Dancer, showgirl and TV host	1	36	4th Evicted
Myriam Catania	40	Rome	Actress	5	29	3rd Evicted
Franceska Pepe	28	Sarzana	Influencer and model	5	22	2nd Evicted
Denis Dosio	19	Forlì	Influencer	5	19	Ejected
Fulvio Abbate	63	Palermo	Writer	5	15	1st Evicted
Fausto Leali	75	Nuvolento	Singer	1	8	Ejected
Flavia Vento	43	Rome	Showgirl and actress	1	3	Walked

=== Guests ===
Name	Age	Birthplace	Famous for...	Duration
Giacomo Urtis	43	Caracas, Venezuela	Medical doctor, singer and TV personality	Day 64 - 82

== Future Appearances ==
In 2021, Dayane Mello competed in A Fazenda 13 (brazilian reality show), she finished the competition in 10th place.

In 2021, Giacomo Urtis once again competed on the show in Grande Fratello VIP 6, entering as a 2-in-1 contestant with Valeria Marini.

On January 7, 2022, Dayane made a cameo in Grande Fratello VIP 6, visiting contestant Soleil Sorge, one of her best friends.

== Nominations table ==
2-in-1 housemate, their nominations counted as one. (Week 1 - 3)
Housemate nominated by Grande Fratello for disciplinary measure.

=== Week 1 - Week 8 ===
	Week 1		Week 2		Week 3		Week 4		Week 5		Week 6		Week 7		Week 8		Nominations total received
	Day 1	Day 5	Day 8	Day 12	Day 15	Day 19	Day 22	Day 26	Day 29	Day 33	Day 36	Day 40	Day 43	Day 47	Day 50	Day 54	Nominations total received
Favorite of the House	none	Andrea; Enock; Matilde; Patrizia; Tommaso	Denis; Elisabetta	none				Andrea; Elisabetta; Enock; Matilde; Patrizia; Pierpaolo	Andrea; Maria Teresa; Massimiliano; Pierpaolo; Tommaso	Dayane; Elisabetta; Enock; ~~Matilde~~; ~~Pierpaolo~~	Guenda; Pierpaolo; Stefania; Tommaso	Patrizia; Rosalinda; Tommaso	none	Enock; Pierpaolo; Tommaso	none		Nominations total received
Tommaso	Nominated	Fausto	Massimiliano	Massimiliano	Denis	Rosalinda	Rosalinda	Massimiliano	Matilde	Andrea	Elisabetta	Francesco	Guenda to save	Massimiliano	Rosalinda	Stefania to save	
Pierpaolo	Nominated	Fausto	Massimiliano	Massimiliano	Massimiliano	Franceska	Myriam	Maria Teresa	Guenda	Guenda	Maria Teresa	Guenda	No; Nominations	Maria Teresa	Maria Teresa	Andrea to save	
Stefania	Not in House	Exempt	Franceska	Myriam	Guenda & Maria Teresa	Enock	Myriam	Dayane	Enock	Andrea	Elisabetta	Francesco	No; Nominations	Elisabetta	Enock	Nominated	
Dayane	Massimiliano	Fausto	Massimiliano	Franceska	Guenda & Maria Teresa	Andrea	Maria Teresa	Stefania	Guenda	Guenda	Patrizia	Stefania	Maria Teresa to save	Francesco	Maria Teresa	Massimiliano to save	
Andrea	Nominated	Massimiliano	Massimiliano	Massimiliano	Massimiliano	Franceska	Maria Teresa	Maria Teresa	Guenda	Guenda	Maria Teresa	Stefania	Pierpaolo to save	Temporarily; Left	Stefania	Nominated	
Rosalinda	Massimiliano	Massimiliano	Massimiliano	Franceska	Guenda & Maria Teresa	Tommaso	Tommaso	Maria Teresa	Stefania	Stefania	Francesco	Francesco	Pierpaolo to save	Francesco	Patrizia	Massimiliano to save	
Giulia	Not in House															Exempt	
Maria Teresa	Not in House	Exempt	Franceska	Rosalinda	Dayane	Andrea	Massimiliano	Massimiliano	Francesco	Andrea	Massimiliano	Francesco	No; Nominations	Massimiliano	Pierpaolo	Nominated	
Elisabetta	Not in House	Exempt	Franceska	Myriam	Guenda & Maria Teresa	Tommaso	Myriam	Maria Teresa	Guenda	Guenda	Maria Teresa	Stefania	No; Nominations	Maria Teresa	Stefania	Paolo to save	
Francesco	Not in House	Exempt	Fulvio	Massimiliano	Massimiliano	Rosalinda	Myriam	Maria Teresa	Guenda	Maria Teresa	Maria Teresa	Stefania	No; Nominations	Dayane	Dayane	Nominated	
Enock	Nominated	Rosalinda	Rosalinda	Massimiliano	Massimiliano	Maria Teresa	Myriam	Stefania	Guenda	Guenda	Maria Teresa	Stefania	Francesco to save	Maria Teresa	Stefania	Francesco to save	
Patrizia	Tommaso	Fausto	Matilde	Rosalinda	Rosalinda	Tommaso	Myriam	Stefania	Dayane	Rosalinda	Dayane	Stefania	Elisabetta to save	Rosalinda	Rosalinda	Maria Teresa to save	
Massimiliano	Nominated	Dayane	Matilde	Tommaso	Francesco	Myriam	Myriam	Maria Teresa	Stefania	Guenda	Maria Teresa	Maria Teresa	Pierpaolo to save	Francesco	Maria Teresa	Nominated	
Paolo	Not in House													Exempt	Nominated	Nominated	0
Stefano	Not in House															Exempt	N/A
Guenda	Not in House	Exempt	Franceska	Rosalinda	Dayane	Francesco	Massimiliano	Dayane	Matilde	Francesco	Dayane	Pierpaolo	No; Nominations	Evicted (Day 47)			20
Matilde	Massimiliano	Massimiliano	Patrizia	Franceska	Guenda & Maria Teresa	Tommaso	Maria Teresa	Maria Teresa	Guenda	Maria Teresa	Evicted (Day 36)						4
Myriam	Not in House	Exempt	Stefania	Rosalinda	Rosalinda	Enock	Massimiliano	Stefania	Evicted (Day 29)								10
Franceska	Not in House	Exempt	Fulvio	Stefania	Dayane	Andrea	Evicted (Day 22)										9
Denis	Not in House	Exempt	Franceska	Massimiliano	Tommaso	Ejected (Day 19)											1
Fulvio	Not in House	Exempt	Guenda & Maria Teresa	Tommaso	Evicted (Day 15)												2
Fausto	Nominated	Rosalinda	Ejected (Day 8)														4
Flavia	Andrea	Walked (Day 3)															0
Notes	1	2, 3, 4	4, 5, 6	7	8, 9, 10	10, 11, 12	13, 14	15	16, 17	18, 19	20	21	22	23, 24, 25	26, 27, 28	29, 30	
Nominated	Andrea; Enock; Fausto; Massimiliano; Pierpaolo; Tommaso	Fausto; Massimiliano	Franceska; Fulvio; Massimiliano; Matilde	Franceska; Fulvio; Massimiliano; Rosalinda	Dayane; Denis; Francesco; Guenda & Maria Teresa; Massimiliano; Rosalinda; Tommaso	Andrea; Franceska; Rosalinda; Tommaso	Maria Teresa; Massimiliano; Myriam	Maria Teresa; Myriam; Stefania	Guenda; Matilde; Stefania	Andrea; Guenda; Maria Teresa; Matilde	Dayane; Elisabetta; Maria Teresa	Elisabetta; Francesco; Guenda; Maria Teresa; Pierpaolo; Stefania		Francesco; Maria Teresa; Massimiliano	Francesco; Maria Teresa; Massimiliano; Paolo; Stefania	Andrea; Francesco; Maria Teresa; Massimiliano; Paolo; Stefania	
Walked	none	Flavia	none														
Ejected	none		Fausto	none		Denis	none										
Evicted	Massimiliano; 3 of 5 votes to face the consequence	Eviction cancelled	Fulvio; 8.0% to save	Fulvio; 7.3% to save	Eviction cancelled	Franceska; 17.8% to save	Myriam; 25.6% to save	Myriam; 31.5% to save	Matilde; 20.7% to save	Matilde; 15.9% to save	Elisabetta; 25.2% to save	Guenda; 13.1% to save		Massimiliano; 19.9% to save	Eviction cancelled	Paolo; 2.6% to save	
Evicted	Massimiliano; 3 of 5 votes to face the consequence	Eviction cancelled	Fulvio; 8.0% to save	Fulvio; 7.3% to save	Eviction cancelled	Franceska; 17.8% to save	Myriam; 25.6% to save	Myriam; 31.5% to save	Matilde; 20.7% to save	Matilde; 15.9% to save	Elisabetta; 25.2% to save	Guenda; 13.1% to save		Francesco; 22.9% to save	Eviction cancelled	Paolo; 2.6% to save	
Saved	Andrea; 1 of 5 votes Tommaso; 1 of 5 votes Enock; 0 of 5 votes Fausto; 0 of 5 votes Pierpaolo; 0 of 5 votes	Eviction cancelled	Matilde; 45.8% Massimiliano; 32.3% Franceska; 13.9%	Rosalinda; 45.4% Massimiliano; 30.2% Franceska; 17.1%	Eviction cancelled	Tommaso; 39.3% Andrea; 25.0% Rosalinda; 17.9%	Massimiliano; 40.9% Maria Teresa; 33.6%	Stefania; 36.4% Maria Teresa; 32.1%	Guenda; 39.7% Stefania; 39.6%	Guenda; 35.0% Maria Teresa; 30.2% Andrea; 18.9%	Maria Teresa; 46.4% Dayane; 28.4%	Pierpaolo; 19.6% Stefania; 18.5% Elisabetta; 17.4% Francesco; 16.6% Maria Teresa; 14.8%		Maria Teresa; 57.2%	Eviction cancelled	Stefania; 28.6% Maria Teresa; 26.5% Francesco; 17.6% Massimiliano; 14.1% Andrea; 10.7%	

=== Week 9 - Week 18 ===
	Week 9			Week 10		Week 11	Week 12		Week 13		Week 14		Week 15	Week 16		Week 17	Week 18	Nominations total received
	Day 57	Day 61		Day 64	Day 68	Week 11	Day 78	Day 82	Day 85	Day 89	Day 92	Day 96	Week 15	Day 106	Day 109	Week 17	Week 18	Nominations total received
Favorite of the House	none				Elisabetta; Tommaso	none		Dayane	Rosalinda	none								Nominations total received
Tommaso	Andrea	Elisabetta to save	Patrizia	Enock	Rosalinda	Andrea	Elisabetta	Rosalinda	Giacomo	Dayane	Stefania	Dayane	Andrea	Mario	No; Nominations	Mario	Carlotta	
Pierpaolo	Massimiliano	Patrizia to save	Maria Teresa	Francesco	Dayane	Selvaggia	Dayane	Selvaggia	Maria Teresa	Maria Teresa	Cristiano	Giacomo	Sonia	Carlotta	No; Nominations	Dayane	Carlotta	
Stefania	Dayane	Francesco to save	Dayane	Patrizia	Rosalinda	Dayane	Dayane	Rosalinda	Giacomo	Dayane	Giacomo	Giacomo	Samantha	Mario	No; Nominations	Dayane	Dayane	
Dayane	Stefania	Maria Teresa to save	Elisabetta	Stefania	Stefania	Enock	Pierpaolo	Stefania	Andrea	Tommaso	Tommaso	Tommaso	Tommaso	Giulia	No; Nominations	Stefania	Stefania	
Andrea	Massimiliano	Nominated	Dayane	Tommaso	Dayane	Selvaggia	Tommaso	Selvaggia	Dayane	Dayane	Giacomo	Giacomo	Maria Teresa	Giacomo	No; Nominations	Dayane	Dayane	
Samantha	Not in House									Exempt			Stefania	Giacomo	No; Nominations	Giulia	Maria Teresa	
Rosalinda	Stefania	Dayane to save	Francesco	Patrizia	Francesco	Francesco	Stefania	Stefania	Stefania	Stefania	Tommaso	Giacomo	Sonia	Mario	No; Nominations	Zenga	Stefania	
Zenga	Not in House											Exempt		Giulia	Nominated	Rosalinda	Cecilia	
Giulia	Exempt			Patrizia	Francesco	Elisabetta	Elisabetta	Pierpaolo	Andrea	Maria Teresa	Cristiano	Maria Teresa	Sonia	Zenga	Nominated	Samantha	Samantha	
Maria Teresa	Elisabetta	Stefania to save	Francesco	Elisabetta	Pierpaolo	Selvaggia	Pierpaolo	Pierpaolo	Giacomo	Pierpaolo	Giacomo	Giulia	Sonia	Samantha	No; Nominations	Dayane	Cecilia	
Carlotta	Not in House											Exempt		Mario	No; Nominations	Maria Teresa	Giulia	
Cecilia	Not in House											Exempt		Mario	No; Nominations	Mario	Rosalinda	3
Mario	Not in House											Exempt		Cecilia	Nominated	Tommaso	Evicted (Day 120)	7
Giacomo	Not in House			Guest				Stefania	Stefania	Maria Teresa	Cristiano	Andrea	Samantha	Zenga	Nominated	Evicted (Day 113)		12
Sonia	Not in House									Exempt			Maria Teresa	Evicted (Day 106)				4
Cristiano	Not in House						Exempt			Pierpaolo	Giulia	Evicted (Day 96)						3
Filippo	Not in House									Exempt		Ejected (Day 96)						N/A
Selvaggia	Not in House	Exempt				Enock	Elisabetta	Pierpaolo	Pierpaolo	Evicted (Day 89)								7
Elisabetta	Stefania	Pierpaolo to save	Dayane	Dayane	Dayane	Selvaggia	Giulia	Not; Eligible	Walked (Day 85)									10
Francesco	Massimiliano	Tommaso to save	Dayane	Pierpaolo	Dayane	Rosalinda	Dayane	Walked (Day 82)										21
Enock	Massimiliano	Saved	Stefania	Francesco	Dayane	Selvaggia	Evicted (Day 78)											7
Patrizia	Stefania	Enock to save	Tommaso	Dayane	Giulia	Evicted (Day 71)												7
Massimiliano	Francesco	Rosalinda to save	Francesco	Evicted (Day 64)														32
Paolo	Evicted (Day 57)																	0
Stefano	Ejected (Day 57)																	0
Notes	31, 32	33, 34		35	36, 37	38	39	40, 41	42	43	44, 45	46, 47	48, 49	50		51	52	
Nominated	Massimiliano; Stefania	Andrea; Dayane; Massimiliano		Francesco; Patrizia	Dayane; Francesco; Patrizia; Rosalinda	Andrea; Dayane; Elisabetta; Enock; Francesco; Rosalinda; Selvaggia	Dayane; Elisabetta; Giulia; Pierpaolo; Stefania; Tommaso	Pierpaolo; Rosalinda; Selvaggia; Stefania	Andrea; Giacomo; Selvaggia; Stefania	Dayane; Maria Teresa; Pierpaolo	Cristiano; Giacomo; Maria Teresa; Tommaso	Andrea; Dayane; Giacomo; Giulia; Maria Teresa; Tommaso	Giacomo; Maria Teresa; Samantha; Sonia	Giacomo; Giulia; Mario; Zenga		Dayane; Giulia; Maria Teresa; Mario; Rosalinda; Samantha; Stefania; Tommaso; Zenga	Carlotta; Cecilia; Dayane; Stefania	
Walked	none							Francesco	Elisabetta	none								
Ejected	Stefano	none										Filippo	none					
Evicted	Massimiliano; 22.3% to save	Massimiliano; 29.6% to save		Patrizia; 14.7% to save	Patrizia; 6.4% to save	Enock; 5.3% to save	Dayane; 37.8% to be immune	Rosalinda; 35.6% to save	Selvaggia; 15.0% to save	Maria Teresa; 26.6% to save	Cristiano; 6.2% to save	Giacomo; 5.4% to save	Sonia; 9.7% to save	Giacomo; 11.7% to save		Mario; 1.8% to save	Cecilia; 2.8% to save	
Evicted	Massimiliano; 22.3% to save	Massimiliano; 29.6% to save		Patrizia; 14.7% to save	Patrizia; 6.4% to save	Enock; 5.3% to save	Dayane; 37.8% to be immune	Selvaggia; 5.3% to save	Selvaggia; 15.0% to save	Maria Teresa; 26.6% to save	Cristiano; 6.2% to save	Giacomo; 5.4% to save	Sonia; 9.7% to save	Giacomo; 11.7% to save		Mario; 1.8% to save	Cecilia; 2.8% to save	
Saved	Stefania; 77.7%	Dayane; 36.8% Andrea; 33.6%		Francesco; 85.3%	Francesco; 38.5% Dayane; 32.5% Rosalinda; 22.6%	Dayane; 22.3% Francesco; 19.7% Rosalinda; 17.7% Elisabetta; 17.5% Selvaggia; 9.5% Andrea; 8.0%	Tommaso; 25.7% Pierpaolo; 17.5% Stefania; 7.4% Elisabetta; 6.1% Giulia; 5.5%	Pierpaolo; 31.6% Stefania; 27.6%	Stefania; 45.3% Giacomo; 22.3% Andrea; 17.4%	Pierpaolo; 37.9% Dayane; 35.5%	Tommaso; 55.0% Maria Teresa; 32.0% Giacomo; 6.8%	Dayane; 29.4% Tommaso; 28.9% Giulia; 15.7% Maria Teresa; 12.0% Andrea; 8.6%	Maria Teresa; 55.3% Samantha; 17.7% Giacomo; 17.3%	Giulia; 56.5% Zenga; 17.7% Mario; 14.2%		Dayane; 21.6% Giulia; 19.4% Rosalinda; 18.8% Tommaso; 15.8% Maria Teresa; 8.8% Stefania; 8.3% Zenga; 3.0% Samantha; 2.5%	Dayane; 60.0% Stefania; 31.6% Carlotta; 5.7%	

=== Week 19 - Finale ===
	Week 19	Week 20		Week 21		Week 22				Week 23		Week 24			Final			Nominations total received
	Week 19	Day 134	Day 138	Day 141	Day 145	Day 148		Day 152		Day 155	Day 159	Day 162	Day 166		Final			Nominations total received
Tommaso	Carlotta	Pierpaolo to be finalist	Giulia	Giulia	Giulia	Stefania to save	Maria Teresa	Stefania to be finalist	Exempt	Samantha	Zenga	Andrea; Samantha	Samantha	Nominated	Finalist	Nominated	Winner (Day 169)	21
Pierpaolo	Maria Teresa	Zenga to be finalist	Samantha	Samantha	Giulia to save	Exempt	Stefania	Exempt		Stefania	Rosalinda	Rosalinda; Stefania	Samantha	Finalist	Nominated	Finalist	Runner-up (Day 169)	11
Stefania	Maria Teresa to be finalist	Pierpaolo	Samantha	Samantha	Giulia	Maria Teresa to save	Giulia	Zenga	Nominated	Giulia	Samantha	Nominated	Samantha	Finalist		Nominated	Third Place (Day 169)	44
Dayane	Samantha to be finalist	Tommaso to be finalist	Giulia	Maria Teresa	Giulia to save	Exempt	Stefania	Exempt		Zenga	Stefania	Rosalinda; Stefania	Stefania	Finalist	Pierpaolo	Fourth Place (Day 169)		37
Andrea	Dayane	Pierpaolo to be finalist	Maria Teresa	Maria Teresa	Alda	Rosalinda to save	Maria Teresa	Rosalinda to be finalist	Exempt	Giulia	Samantha	Saved	Samantha	Tommaso	Evicted (Day 169)			14
Samantha	Dayane to be finalist	Zenga	Maria Teresa	Stefania	Maria Teresa	Nominated	Giulia	Exempt	Rosalinda to save	Giulia	Zenga	Saved	Stefania	Evicted (Day 166)				19
Rosalinda	Dayane to be finalist	Exempt	Maria Teresa	Zenga	Alda	Tommaso to save	Maria Teresa	Stefania	Nominated	Giulia	Stefania	Nominated	Evicted (Day 166)					24
Zenga	Samantha	Pierpaolo to be finalist	Carlotta	Rosalinda	Alda	Nominated	Maria Teresa	Giulia	Stefania to save	Giulia	Samantha	Evicted (Day 162)						8
Giulia	Maria Teresa to be finalist	Tommaso	Carlotta	Tommaso	Tommaso	Saved	Tommaso	Samantha	Rosalinda to save	Stefania	Evicted (Day 159)							20
Maria Teresa	Dayane to be finalist	Pierpaolo	Samantha	Samantha	Andrea	Giulia to save	Andrea	Evicted (Day 152)										46
Alda	Not in House		Exempt	Nominated	Zenga	Ejected (Day 146)												3
Carlotta	Dayane to be finalist	Zenga	Tommaso	Evicted (Day 141)														5
Cecilia	Evicted (Day 127)																	3
Notes	53	54	55	56										57				
Nominated	Dayane; Giulia; Rosalinda; Stefania	Andrea; Pierpaolo	Carlotta; Giulia; Maria Teresa; Samantha	Alda	Alda; Samantha	Maria Teresa; Samantha; Zenga		Andrea; Rosalinda; Tommaso		Giulia; Stefania	Samantha; Stefania; Zenga	Rosalinda; Stefania	Samantha; Stefania	Andrea; Tommaso	Dayane; Pierpaolo	Stefania; Tommaso	Pierpaolo; Tommaso	
Nominated	Dayane; Giulia; Rosalinda; Stefania	Andrea; Pierpaolo	Carlotta; Giulia; Maria Teresa; Samantha	Maria Teresa; Samantha	Alda; Samantha	Maria Teresa; Samantha; Zenga		Andrea; Rosalinda; Tommaso		Giulia; Stefania	Samantha; Stefania; Zenga	Rosalinda; Stefania	Samantha; Stefania	Andrea; Tommaso	Dayane; Pierpaolo	Stefania; Tommaso	Pierpaolo; Tommaso	
Walked	none																	
Ejected	none				Alda	none												
Evicted	Dayane; 45.5% to be finalist	Pierpaolo; 56.1% to be finalist	Carlotta; 6.4% to save	Alda; 54.5% to save	Eviction cancelled	Maria Teresa; 28.3% to save		Tommaso; 61.4% to be finalist		Giulia; 46.6% to save	Zenga; 7.2% to save	Rosalinda; 42.7% to save	Samantha; 20.7% to be finalist	Andrea; 83.8% to evict	Dayane; 67.8% to evict	Stefania; 66.6% to evict	Pierpaolo; 31.7% to win	
Evicted	Dayane; 45.5% to be finalist	Pierpaolo; 56.1% to be finalist	Carlotta; 6.4% to save	Samantha; 21.7% to save	Eviction cancelled	Maria Teresa; 28.3% to save		Tommaso; 61.4% to be finalist		Giulia; 46.6% to save	Zenga; 7.2% to save	Rosalinda; 42.7% to save	Samantha; 20.7% to be finalist	Andrea; 83.8% to evict	Dayane; 67.8% to evict	Stefania; 66.6% to evict	Pierpaolo; 31.7% to win	
Saved	Giulia; 27.2% Stefania; 24.9% Rosalinda; 2.4%	Andrea; 43.9%	Giulia; 54.4% Maria Teresa; 28.0% Samantha; 11.2%	Alda; 45.5% to evict	Eviction cancelled	Samantha; 39.7% Zenga; 32.0%		Rosalinda; 35.6% Andrea; 3.0%		Stefania; 53.4%	Samantha; 47.5% Stefania; 45.3%	Stefania; 57.3%	Stefania; 79.3% to be finalist	Tommaso; 16.2%	Pierpaolo; 32.2%	Tommaso; 33.4%	Tommaso; 68.3% to win	
Saved	Giulia; 27.2% Stefania; 24.9% Rosalinda; 2.4%	Andrea; 43.9%	Giulia; 54.4% Maria Teresa; 28.0% Samantha; 11.2%	Maria Teresa; 78.3%	Eviction cancelled	Samantha; 39.7% Zenga; 32.0%		Rosalinda; 35.6% Andrea; 3.0%		Stefania; 53.4%	Samantha; 47.5% Stefania; 45.3%	Stefania; 57.3%	Stefania; 79.3% to be finalist	Tommaso; 16.2%	Pierpaolo; 32.2%	Tommaso; 33.4%	Tommaso; 68.3% to win	

=== Notes ===
- ^Note 1 : During the first live show, only female housemates could vote for which male housemate to face the consequence. Massimiliano received the most votes, he must stay in a washing machine for the night for a week.
- ^Note 2 : On Day 2 afternoon, Tommaso Zorzi temporarily left the house to the hospital and he back to the house on Day 3 morning. Flavia Vento decided to quit for personal reasons, and she left the house at midnight on Day 2 and Day 3.
- ^Note 3 : Andrea, Enock, Matilde, Patrizia and Tommaso were immuned since they are voted as the favorite of the week. New housemates were also can't be nominated. The public did not vote to evict a housemate but the one who received the least vote would be the first nominated on Day 8.
- ^Note 4 : The televoting which involved Fausto and Massimiliano was cancelled due to a disciplinary measure against a housemate. Fausto was ejected during the third live show for making offensive comments.
- ^Note 5 : The housemates that entered the house on Day 1 had to vote for one of the housemates that entered on Day 5 to be immune, the 2 most voted housemates were Denis and Elisabetta. The two then had to give immunity for a housemate entered on Day 5, they chose Francesco.
- ^Note 6 : Denis, Elisabetta and Francesco were immuned. Housemates are divided into groups by the day of their entry. Housemates who entered Day 5 would nominate in the confessional, while housemates who entered Day 1 would nominate in public. The public did not vote to evict a housemate but the one who received the least vote would be the first nominated on Day 12. Fulvio received the least vote, therefore being the first nominated for the next nomination, and face the public vote with Franceska, Massimiliano and Rosalinda.
- ^Note 7 : On Day 12, housemates could only nominate one housemate of their own gender. Female housemates would nominate in public while male housemates would nominate in the confessional.
- ^Note 8 : A surprise nomination was made for female housemates. Through a lottery mechanism, Franceska and Myriam obtained immunities. Subsequently, both of them were asked to name a housemate each of who must be evicted from the house immediately, but in fact, the housemates chosen will move to the "Cucurio" room. The two housemates they choose are Massimiliano and Tommaso. Massimiliano and Tommaso were asked to choose to remove the immunity of one of Franceska and Myriam, they chose Myriam and she will also have to move to the "Cucurio" room.
- ^Note 9 : Housemates could only nominate one housemate of their own gender (except Franceska). Female housemates would nominate in confessional while male housemates would nominate in the public. The public did not vote to evict a housemate but the one who received the least vote would be the first nominated on Day 19.
- ^Note 10 : The televoting which involved Dayane, Denis, Francesco, Guenda & Maria Teresa, Massimiliano, Rosalinda and Tommaso was cancelled due to a disciplinary measure against a housemate. Denis was ejected during the sixth live show for cursing in the night.
- ^Note 11 : A surprise nomination was made for male housemates. Through a lottery mechanism, Enock and Massimiliano obtained immunities. Subsequently, both of them were asked to name a female housemate to give immunity, they chose Matilde. Matilde was asked to choose to remove the immunity of one of Enock and Massimiliano, she chose Enock.
- ^Note 12 : The duo made up of Maria Teresa and Guenda were split and become two individual housemates.
- ^Note 13 : A surprise nomination was made for housemates. Franceska, the evicted housemate of the night, was asked to name a housemate who does not deserve to stay, she chose Myriam. Subsequently, Myriam was asked to choose who she does not want to obtain immunity, starting a chain of voting. Only the five housemates excluded from the chain will obtain immunity from the nomination.
- ^Note 14 : The public did not vote to evict a housemate but the one who received the least vote would be the first nominated on Day 26. Myriam received the least vote, therefore being the first nominated for the next nomination, and face the public vote with Maria Teresa and Stefania.
- ^Note 15 : Andrea, Enock, Elisabetta, Matilde, Patrizia and Pierpaolo were immuned since they are voted as the favorite of the week, and Myriam was already nominated for eviction. Immuned housemates nominated in confessional, and the housemates at risk for being nominated nominate in public.
- ^Note 16 : A surprise nomination was made for housemates. Maria Teresa and Stefania, the two housemates saved from the previous eviction, were asked to choose a housemate to save, they chose Tommaso. Then, Tommaso was asked to choose who he wants to save and starting a rescue chain. Guenda and Massimiliano were excluded from the rescue chain, must leave the house immediately and move to the "Cucurio" room, and subsequently, they were asked to choose two housemates to move with them, they chose Adua and Elisabetta.
- ^Note 17 : Andrea, Maria Teresa, Massimiliano, Pierpaolo and Tommaso were immune since they are voted as the favorite of the week. The housemates in the "Cucurio" room would nominate in the confessional. While in the housemates in the Main House, through a lottery mechanism to choose they would nominate in the confessional or in public. The public did not vote to evict a housemate but the one who received the least vote would be the first nominated on Day 33. Matilde received the least vote, therefore being the first nominated for the next nomination, and face the public vote with Andrea, Guenda and Maria Teresa.
- ^Note 18 : A surprise nomination was made for housemates. The favorites of the house (except Matilde because she was already nominated for eviction), unlike the previous rounds, were not automatically immune. In fact, they would gambling by chance. Dayane, the lucky one receives immunity and was asked to choose to remove the immunity of one of the favorites of the house, she chose Pierpaolo.
- ^Note 19 : Dayane, Elisabetta and Enock were immuned since they are voted as the favorite of the week, and Matilde was already nominated for eviction. Immuned housemates nominated in confessional, and the housemates at risk, through a lottery mechanism to choose they would nominate in the confessional or in public.
- ^Note 20 : Guenda, Pierpaolo, Stefania and Tommaso were immuned since they are voted as the favorite of the week. Immuned housemates nominated in confessional, and the housemates at risk for being nominated nominate in public. The public did not vote to evict a housemate but the one who received the least vote would be the first nominated on Day 40. Elisabetta received the least vote, therefore being the first nominated for the next nomination, and face the public vote with Francesco, Guenda, Maria Teresa, Pierpaolo and Stefania.
- ^Note 21 : Patrizia, Rosalinda and Tommaso were immuned since they are voted as the favorite of the week, and Elisabetta was already nominated for eviction. Immuned housemates nominated in confessional, and the housemates at risk for being nominated nominate in public. This week's televoting will be open for a week and will be closed on Day 47.
- ^Note 22 : A surprise voting was made for housemates. Since televoting for eviction is still active, no new nominations were made. In fact, the housemates who are not nominated have the opportunity to influence the result of the televoting. They must name one of the nominated housemates they want to save.
- ^Note 23 : On Day 47 afternoon, Andrea Zelletta temporarily left the house for family reasons and he back to the house on Day 48 morning.
- ^Note 24 : A surprise nomination was made for housemates. The favorites of the house would be gambling by chance. Tommaso, the lucky one was asked to give immunity to one of the female housemates, he chose Stefania.
- ^Note 25 : Enock, Pierpaolo and Tommaso were immuned since they are voted as the favorite of the week, also Stefania is immuned by choice of Tommaso and Paolo as a new housemate. Immuned housemates nominated in confessional, and the housemates at risk for being nominated nominate in public. The public did not vote to evict a housemate but the two who received the least vote would be the first nominated on Day 50. Francesco and Massimiliano received the least vote, therefore being the first nominated for the next nomination, and face the public vote with Maria Teresa, Stefania and Paolo.
- ^Note 26 : Paolo was nominated by Grande Fratello for revealing some external details inside the house.
- ^Note 27 : Francesco, Massimiliano and Paolo were already nominated for eviction. The housemates already in nomination nominated in confessional and the housemates at risk for being nominated nominate in public. This week's televoting will be open for a week and will be closed on Day 57.
- ^Note 28 : The week-long televoting which involved Francesco, Maria Teresa, Massimiliano, Stefania and Paolo was cancelled after 4 days due to a disciplinary measure against a housemate.
- ^Note 29 : The previously cancelled televoting is reopened with the addition of Andrea among the nominated for revealing some external details inside the house.
- ^Note 30 : A surprise voting was made for housemates. Since televoting for eviction is still active, no new nominations were made. In fact, the housemates who are not nominated have the opportunity to influence the result of the televoting. They must name one of the nominated housemates they want to save.
- ^Note 31 : Stefano was ejected during the seventeenth live show for cursing in the night.
- ^Note 32 : Giulia was immuned as a new housemate. On Day 57, housemates could only nominate one housemate of their own gender. Female housemates would nominate in public while male housemates would nominate in the confessional. The public did not vote to evict a housemate but the one who received the least vote would be the first nominated on Day 61. Massimiliano received the least vote, therefore being the first nominated for the next nomination, and face the public vote with Andrea and Dayane.
- ^Note 33 : A surprise nomination was made for housemates. Massimiliano, the nominated housemate of the night, was asked to name a housemate who wants to save, she chose Rosalinda. Subsequently, Rosalinda was asked to choose who she does want to save, starting a rescue chain. The housemate excluded from the chain was Andrea, who goes directly to the nomination.
- ^Note 34 : Giulia and Selvaggia were immuned as new housemates while Andrea and Massimiliano were already nominated for eviction. The housemates at risk, through a lottery mechanism, chose they would nominate in the confessional or in public.
- ^Note 35 : Selvaggia was immuned as a new housemate while Giacomo was a guest in the house. Male housemates would nominate in public while female housemates would nominate in the confessional. The public did not vote to evict a housemate but the one who received the least vote would be the first nominated on Day 68. Patrizia received the least vote, therefore being the first nominated for the next nomination, and face the public vote with Dayane, Francesco and Rosalinda.
- ^Note 36 : A surprise voting was made for housemates. The favorites of the house were asked to choose to give the immunity of one of the "runner-up" favorites of the house (Andrea and Stefania), they chose Andrea.
- ^Note 37 : Elisabetta and Tommaso were immuned since they are voted as the favorite of the week, also Andrea is immuned by choice of Elisabetta and Tommaso, Selvaggia was immuned as a new housemate while Patrizia was already nominated and Giacomo was a guest inside the house. The housemates at risk, through a lottery mechanism, chose they would nominate in the confessional or in public.
- ^note 38 : For this round of nomination, the housemates at risk, through a lottery mechanism to choose who they would nominate in the confessional or in public.
- ^note 39 : Cristiano was immuned as new housemates. For this round of nominations, the housemates at risk, through a lottery mechanism to choose who they would nominate in the confessional or in public. The public did not vote to evict a housemate but the one who received the most vote would be exempt from nominations on Day 82. Dayane received the most vote, therefore being immuned for the next nomination.
- ^note 40 : Following the two-month extension of the show, Grande Fratello offered housemates the opportunity to decide whether to immediately quit the game or to continue and stay in the house. Following the decisions made by the housemates, Francesco decides to leave the house immediately, while Elisabetta will remain in the house until Day 85.
- ^note 41 : Dayane was immuned since she is voted as the favorite of the week, also Cristiano is immuned as new housemates. By officially becoming a housemate, Giacomo will be able to make the nominations. For this round of nominations, the housemates at risk would nominate in public. The public did not vote to evict a housemate but the one who received the most vote would be exempt from nominations, while the one who received the least vote would be the first nominated on Day 85. Rosalinda received the most vote, therefore being immuned for the next nomination, while Selvaggia received the least vote, therefore being the first nominated for the next nomination, and face the public vote with Andrea, Giacomo and Stefania.
- ^note 42 : Rosalinda was immuned since she is voted as the favorite of the week, Cristiano is immuned as new housemates and while Selvaggia was already nominated. For this round of nominations, the housemates at risk would nominate in public.
- ^note 43 : Filippo, Samantha and Sonia were immuned as new housemates. For this round of nominations, the housemates at risk would nominate in public. The public did not vote to evict a housemate but the one who received the least vote would be the first nominated on Day 92. Maria Teresa received the least vote, therefore being the first nominated for the next nomination, and face the public vote with Cristiano, Giacomo and Tommaso.
- ^note 44 : A surprise nomination was made for housemates. The last six housemates entered the house, were asked to choose who among the "original" housemates do not want to obtain immunity, starting a chain of voting. The housemate excluded from the chain was Rosalinda, who will be exempt from nomination.
- ^note 45 : Filippo, Samantha and Sonia were immuned as new housemates, Rosalinda is immuned by choice of the chain while Maria Teresa was already nominated. For this round of nominations, the housemates at risk, through a lottery mechanism to choose whothey would nominate in the confessional or in public.
- ^Note 46 : Filippo was ejected during the twenty-seventh live show following repeated sexist sentences addressed to some female housemates.
- ^Note 47 : Carlotta, Cecilia, Mario, Samantha, Sonia and Zenga were immuned as new housemates. For this round of nominations, the housemates at risk, through a lottery mechanism to choose whothey would nominate in the confessional or in public. The public did not vote to evict a housemate but the one who received the least vote would be the first nominated on Day 99. Giacomo received the least vote, therefore being the first nominated for the next nomination, and face the public vote with Maria Teresa, Samantha and Sonia.
- ^Note 48 : A surprise nomination was made for housemates. The last four housemates entered the house, were asked to choose who among the housemates, divided in couples, do not want to obtain immunity, starting a chain of voting. The housemate excluded from the chain were Dayane and Rosalinda, who subsequently faces the choice of Giacomo, the housemate already nominated. The housemate excluded from the chain was Dayane, who will be exempt from nomination.
- ^Note 49 : Carlotta, Cecilia, Mario and Zenga were immuned as new housemates, Dayane is immuned by choice of the chain while Giacomo was already nominated. For this round of nominations, the housemates at risk, through a lottery mechanism to choose whothey would nominate in the confessional or in public.
- ^Note 50 : The group of housemates that entered the game during the first week, either on Day 1 or on Day 5, were immuned, and only the housemates that entered the House subsequently were eligible to be nominated. Immuned housemates nominated in confessional, and the housemates at risk for being nominated nominate in public. This week's televoting will be open for a week, due to the following episode being a New Year's Day special, and will be closed on Day 113.
- ^Note 51 : For this round of nominations, the housemates, through a lottery mechanism to choose who they would nominate in the confessional or in public.
- ^Note 52 : For this round of nominations, only female housemates are at risk, due to outnumbered male housemates in the house. Female housemates will nominate in public, while the male housemates could choose to do so either in the confessional or in public.
- ^Note 53 : For this round of nominations, the male housemates voted for the female housemate that they don't want in the final. The three female housemates who were not nominated were up for nomination to win a place in the final. Then another round to choose the fourth nominee was held among all the female housemates, who voted for the housemate they want in the final, with the possibility of self-voting.
- ^Note 54 : For this round of nominations, the female housemates (without Dayane) voted, in pairs, for the male housemate that they don't want in the final (the pairs were Carlotta-Samantha, Giulia-Rosalinda and Stefania-Maria Teresa). In case of disagreement between the members of the pair, the first elected finalist Dayane would choose which member would get to decide. She chose Giulia for the Giulia-Rosalinda pair. The remaining male housemate who was not nominated was up for nomination to win a place in the final. Then another round to choose the second nominee was held among all the male housemates plus Dayane, who voted for the housemate they want in the final, with the possibility of self-voting.
- ^Note 55 : For this round of nominations, the housemates voted publicly for who they wanted to nominate. The two contestants elected finalists, Dayane and Pierpaolo, voted in the confessional and had the advantage of knowing the number of votes each housemate had received before making their vote.
- ^Note 56 : Following a disciplinary measure, a flash televoting is opened which determines whether Alda will be able to stay in the House.
- ^Note 57 : Alfonso Signorini announced that the first round of the finals would officially start at the end of Day 166. The last remaining housemate not to be named a finalist through the public vote, Andrea, had to choose one of the four other contestants to face in a televoting that would be closed on Day 169.

== Favorite of the House ==
The public has the opportunity to vote for their favorite housemate, the result would affect the nominations. The housemates received the majority votes receive immunity. Only the housemates who received the minority votes would be available to be nominated.

No.	Week 1 Day 5	Week 5 Day 29	Week 6 Day 36
1	Tommaso; 29.4%	Tommaso; 40.5%	Tommaso; 35.8%
2	Andrea; 15.7%	Maria Teresa; 8.9%	Stefania; 13.5%
3	Patrizia; 12.1%	Pierpaolo; 6.6%	Guenda; 12.1%
4	Enock; 10.7%	Massimiliano; 6.6%	Pierpaolo; 5.9%
5	Matilde; 8.0%	Andrea; 6.5%	Andrea; 5.6%
6	Rosalinda; 6.6%	Rosalinda; 6.0%	Rosalinda; 5.5%
7	Pierpaolo; 6.4%	Stefania; 5.4%	Maria Teresa; 5.3%
8	Massimiliano; 4.4%	Guenda; 3.6%	Massimiliano; 4.4%
9	Dayane; 4.2%	Enock; 3.1%	Francesco; 3.7%
10	Fausto; 2.4%	Francesco; 3.0%	Elisabetta; 2.7%
11	Flavia -	Patrizia; 2.8%	Dayane; 2.4%
12		Elisabetta; 2.7%	Patrizia; 1.8%
13		Matilde; 2.5%	Enock; 1.3%
14		Dayane; 2.0%	

== TV Ratings and guests ==
Live shows

Week	Episode	Date	Viewers	Share	Guest
1	1	September 14, 2020	2,833,000	18.99%	none
1	2	September 18, 2020	2,440,000	14.77%	Alba Parietti
2	3	September 21, 2020	3,000,000	18.10%	Mario Balotelli, Amedeo Goria
2	4	September 25, 2020	2,877,000	16.76%	Gabriel Garko
3	5	September 28, 2020	3,130,000	19.76%	none
3	6	October 2, 2020	3,037,000	18.17%	none
4	7	October 5, 2020	3,390,000	20.56%	none
4	8	October 9, 2020	2,754,000	16.50%	Daniela del Secco d'Aragona
5	9	October 12, 2020	3,120,000	18.70%	Mario Balotelli
5	10	October 16, 2020	3,039,000	17.40%	none
6	11	October 19, 2020	3,429,000	20.70%	Antonio Zequila
6	12	October 23, 2020	3,398,000	19.20%	Alice Fabbrica, Mario Balotelli
7	13	October 26, 2020	3,114,000	19.20%	none
7	14	October 30, 2020	3,188,000	18.70%	Amedeo Goria, Alba Parietti
8	15	November 2, 2020	3,279,000	19.40%	Barbara D'Urso
8	16	November 6, 2020	3,379,000	18.70%	none
9	17	November 9, 2020	3,485,000	20.10%	Alba Parietti, Giada De Blanck
9	18	November 13, 2020	3,150,000	17.70%	none
10	19	November 16, 2020	3,501,000	19.65%	none
10	20	November 20, 2020	3,566,000	19.70%	none
11	21	November 23, 2020	3,497,000	20.20%	Giada De Blanck
12	22	November 30, 2020	3,560,000	20.50%	none
12	23	December 4, 2020	3,369,000	18.52%	none
13	24	December 7, 2020	3,649,000	19.82%	none
13	25	December 11, 2020	3,184,000	17.30%	Iva Zanicchi
14	26	December 14, 2020	3,356,000	20.00%	Ariadna Romero
14	27	December 18, 2020	3,379,000	18.70%	none
15	28	December 21, 2020	3,383,000	20.60%	Arisa, Alberto Urso
16	29	December 28, 2020	3,663,000	20.20%	Maria De Filippi
16	30; Happy New Year	December 31, 2020	2,899,000	12.90%	Rita Rusić, Valeria Marini, Ada Alberti, The Kolors
17	31	January 4, 2021	3,491,000	19.60%	none
18	32	January 11, 2021	3,290,000	19.60%	Roberta Termali
19	33	January 18, 2021	3,215,000	19.00%	Andrea Pucci
20	34	January 25, 2021	3,393,000	19.50%	none
20	35	January 29, 2021	3,232,000	18.20%	Walter Zenga, Alba Parietti
21	36	February 1, 2021	3,432,000	20.30%	none
21	37	February 5, 2021	2,965,000	16.80%	none
22	38	February 8, 2021	3,692,000	21.20%	Francesco Baccini
22	39	February 12, 2021	3,264,000	17.70%	Ariadna Romero, Walter Zenga
23	40	February 15, 2021	3,483,000	20.00%	none
23	41	February 19, 2021	3,491,000	19.00%	Giada De Blanck
24	42	February 22, 2021	3,572,000	20.78%	Roberta Termali
24	Semifinal	February 26, 2021	3,593,000	19.30%	none
25	Final	March 1, 2021	4,298,000	25.40%	Ariadna Romero
Average			3,306,000	19.04%	
