= Giucas Casella =

Italian hypnotist (born 1949)

- Born: Giuseppe Casella; 15 November 1949 (age 76); Termini Imerese, Italy
- Occupations: Illusionist; hypnotis

Giucas Casella (Italian pronunciation: [ˈdʒuːkas kaˈzɛlla]; born Giuseppe Casella on 15 November 1949) is an Italian illusionist, hypnotist and television personality.

== Life and career ==
Born in Termini Imerese, Palermo, he started his career at 17 years old, performing in a disco in Alassio. After about 10 years of shows in European casinos, the presenter Pippo Baudo, who had noticed him during an exhibition in an Antenna Sicilia TV-show, launched his career casting him in the 1980 edition of the popular show Domenica in. He is best known for his experiments of hypnotism to people and animals.

In 2004, Casella participated to the Rai 1 reality show Il ristorante, ranking fourth, and in 2008 he was a contestant in L'Isola dei famosi (the Italian version of Celebrity Survivor), retiring for health problems. In 2018 he was once again a contestant in L'Isola dei famosi, retiring once again for health problems. In 2021 he competed on the sixth season of Grande Fratello VIP (the Italian version of Celebrity Big Brother) getting evicted on Day 183, finishing in the 6th position.

== Personal life ==
Giucas Casella lives with actress Valeria Perilli and has a son from another relationship. He considers himself Catholic.
