= Grande Fratello VIP =

- Genre: Reality show
- Created by: John de Mol Jr.
- Directed by: Sergio Colabona (2016–2017); Marco Fuortes (2016–2026); Alessio Pollacci (2017–2026)
- Presented by: Ilary Blasi (2016–2018, 2026–); Alfonso Signorini (2020–2023)
- Country of origin: Italy
- Original language: Italian
- No. of series: 8

Production
- Producer: Endemol
- Running time: 185–225 min (main show); 1440 min (live)

Original release
- Network: Canale 5 (main show); Italia 1 (day-time); La5 (live); Mediaset Extra (live); Mediaset Infinity (live)
- Release: 19 September 2016 – present

Related
- Grande Fratello

Grande Fratello VIP is the celebrity version of Grande Fratello, the Italian version of the reality television franchise Big Brother.

== Format ==
Based on the original Dutch version created by Endemol, the show sees a number of "housemates", often selected from diverse genders, social backgrounds and geographical locations, living together in a house under constant surveillance, where the viewing public can often watch them around the clock, and vote them out of the house as they choose.

The housemates can visit the "confessional" at any time during the day, either to speak privately to the producers or 'Big Brother', or to nominate.

The title is inspired by the George Orwell novel Nineteen Eighty-Four. The novel tells of a Big Brother, head of the totalitarian state of Oceania that constantly monitors its inhabitants by camera in an attempt to suppress their free will. The tag line of the novel is "Big Brother is watching you", which inspired the show, as it is Big Brother who now has total control over the situation in the house.

The housemates live in a house 24 hours a day, bugged by numerous cameras and microphones which capture their every move. Every week the housemates participate in tasks that determine their food budget for that week, or could even affect that week's nominations. The overall goal is to be the final surviving housemate and claim the prize fund.

== Series details ==
| Seasons | Launch date | Finale date | Days | Housemates | Winner | Host | Opinionist | | | | Guest | Social room | | | Direction | | Grand prize | Average viewers (in millions) | Average share |
| Seasons | Launch date | Finale date | Days | Housemates | Winner | Host | In studio | | | | In connection | Social reporter | Radio broadcaster | Internet company | Studio | Home | Grand prize | Average viewers (in millions) | Average share |
|---|---|---|---|---|---|---|---|---|---|---|---|---|---|---|---|---|---|---|---|
| 1 | 19 September 2016 | 7 November 2016 | 50 | 14 | Alessia Macari | Ilary Blasi | Alfonso Signorini | | | | none | Alessandro Sansone | R101 | none | Sergio Colabona | Marco Fuortes | €100,000 | 4,19 | 21.73% |
| 2 | 11 September 2017 | 4 December 2017 | 85 | 20 | Daniele Bossari | Ilary Blasi | Alfonso Signorini | | | | Gialappa's Band | Alessandro Sansone | R101 | none | Alessio Pollacci | Marco Fuortes | €100,000 | 4,86 | 25.65% |
| 3 | 24 September 2018 | 10 December 2018 | 78 | 23 | Walter Nudo | Ilary Blasi | Alfonso Signorini | | | | Gialappa's Band | none | none | none | Alessio Pollacci | Marco Fuortes | €100,000 | 3,41 | 20.04% |
| 4 | 8 January 2020 | 8 April 2020 | 92 | 29 | Paola Di Benedetto | Alfonso Signorini | Pupo | | | Wanda Nara | none | none | none | none | Alessio Pollacci | Marco Fuortes | €100,000 | 3,41 | 18.83% |
| 5 | 14 September 2020 | 1 March 2021 | 169 | 34 | Tommaso Zorzi | Alfonso Signorini | Pupo | | | Antonella Elia | none | none | none | none | Alessio Pollacci | Marco Fuortes | €100,000 | 3,30 | 19.04% |
| 6 | 13 September 2021 | 14 March 2022 | 183 | 38 | Jessica Hailé Selassié | Alfonso Signorini | Sonia Bruganelli | Adriana Volpe | Laura Freddi | Adriana&Rossella Rota | none | none | none | Linkem | Alessio Pollacci | Marco Fuortes | €100,000 | 3,09 | 20.20% |
| 7 | 19 September 2022 | 3 April 2023 | 197 | 35 | Nikita Pelizon | Alfonso Signorini | Sonia Bruganelli | Orietta Berti | Soleil Sorge | Pierpaolo Pretelli | none | Giulia Salemi | none | Linkem | Alessio Pollacci | Marco Fuortes | €100,000 | 2,65 | 20.58% |
| 8 | 17 March 2026 | 19 May 2026 | 64 | 16 | Alessandra Mussolini | Ilary Blasi | Cesara Buonamici | | | Selvaggia Lucarelli | none | none | none | none | Alessio Pollacci | Marco Fuortes | €100,000 | 1,96 | 16.93% |
| 9 | 17 September 2026 | TBA | TBA | 18 | | Ilary Blasi | Cesara Buonamici | | | Selvaggia Lucarelli | none | none | none | none | Alessio Pollacci | Marco Fuortes | €100,000 | | |
