= Adriana Volpe =

Italian television presenter, model and actress

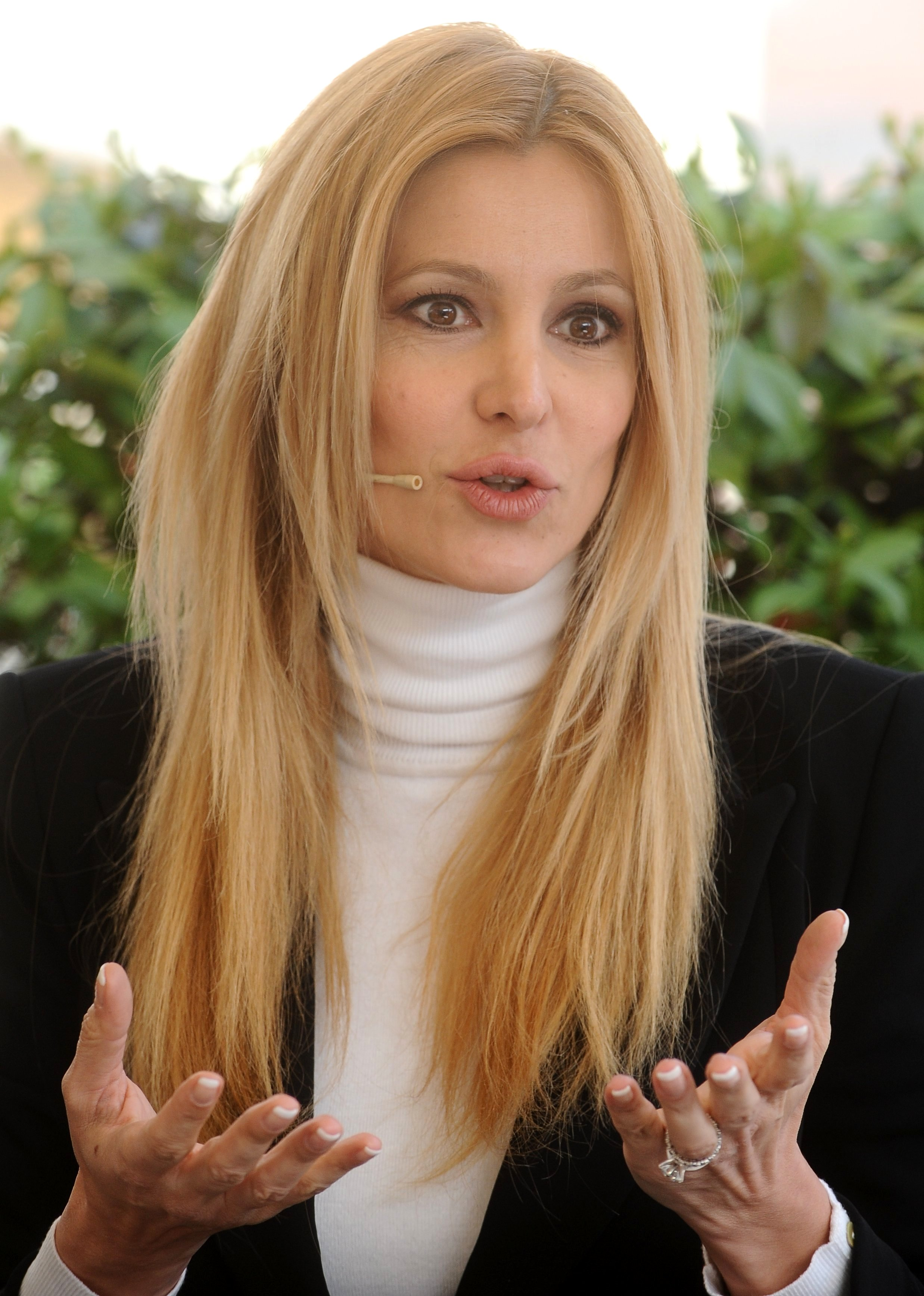
- Born: May 31, 1973 (age 53); Trento, Italy
- Spouse(s): Chicco Cangini (m. 2000–2000) Roberto Parli (m. 2008–present; 1 child)
- Website: http://www.adrianavolpe.it/

Adriana Volpe (born 31 May 1973) is an Italian television presenter, model and actress.

== Biography ==
After graduating from scientific high school she moved to Rome. In 1990 she began the modeling profession, walking on the catwalks of various fashion capitals: Milan, Paris, Zürich, Tokyo. In 1992 she was engaged by RAI as the showgirl for the programme Scommettiamo che... (Italian version of the popular German programme Wetten, dass..?), hosted by Fabrizio Frizzi, going on until 1995. She also supported Frizzi in Prove e provini a Scommettiamo che...?, daily programme related to the Lotteria Italia (Italian Lottery) and appendix of Scommettiamo che...?. In 1995 she made her film debut in Viaggi di nozze by Carlo Verdone, playing the role of Marcella, and Croce e delizia, directed by Luciano De Crescenzo, in the role of Barbara.

In 1996 she joined TMC 2 where until 1999 she hosted in the early fringe the youth programme The Lion Trophy Show, renamed in 1997 as Lion Network due to some changes in the structure of the programme. In 1999 she came back in Rai to take part in the weekend programme Mezzogiorno in famiglia, aired on Rai 2, that she hosted till 2009. In 2001 she acted in the first episode of the second season of the TV series Non lasciamoci più. From 2003 to June 2009 in addition to Mezzogiorno in famiglia she hosted the programme Mattina in famiglia. She was the author and presenter of In forma Rimini Fitness, a reportage from the Festival of Fitness in Rimini broadcast in 2004 on Rai 2, in the same year she made a glamour calendar for the weekly Panorama and she entered the Albo dei giornalisti (Journalists Association).

During the summer of 2006 she hosted two programmes in the prime time of Rai 2: the fashion show La notte delle sirene, supported by Sasà Salvaggio, and the variety show in four episodes Notte Mediterranea, together with the Roman showman Max Tortora. In the spring of 2007 she was one of the competitors in the second edition of the talent show Notti sul ghiaccio, broadcast on Rai 1.

In September 2009 she began to host the programme I fatti vostri, from Monday to Friday morning on Rai 2, together with Giancarlo Magalli and Marcello Cirillo. She has been confirmed in hosting the programme I fatti vostri also for the further television seasons until season 2016/17.

In 2012 she graduated in literature from Università degli Studi eCampus.

From September 2017, together with Massimiliano Ossini and Sergio Friscia, she hosts Mezzogiorno in famiglia, on air every Saturday and Sunday on Rai 2 from 11 a.m to 1 p.m.

== Personal ==
In 2000 she married Chicco Cangini, but the union lasted only four months. In July 2008 Volpe married the businessman Roberto Parli, after being engaged for a little more than a year.

== Filmography ==
Films
Year	Title	Role
1995	Viaggi di nozze	Marcella
1995	Croce e delizia	Barbara
2000	Arresti domiciliari	Sabrina
2016	Teen Star Academy	Patty

Television
Year	Title	Role	Notes
1993–1996	Scommettiamo che...?	Herself	Regular guest
1999–2019	Mezzogiorno in famiglia	Herself	Host (seasons 7-16; 25-26)
2001	Non lasciamoci più	Maria	Italian TV Series; episode: "Un figlio in comune"
2007	Notti sul ghiaccio	Herself	Contestant
2009–2017	I fatti vostri	Herself	Host
2018	Pechino Express	Herself	Contestant
2020–2021	Grande Fratello VIP	Herself	Contestant, Opinionist
