= Alessia Mancini =

Italian television host, television personality, actress and showgirl

- Born: 25 June 1978 (age 48); Marino, Lazio, Italy
- Education: IULM University of Milan
- Occupations: Television host; television personality; actress; showgirl
- Years active: 1994–present
- Height: 175 cm (5 ft 9 in)
- Spouse: Flavio Montrucchio (m. 2003)
- Children: 2
- Website: www.alessiamancini.it

Alessia Mancini (born 25 June 1978) is an Italian television host, television personality, actress and showgirl.

== Biography ==
Mancini made her television debut in 1994, she took part in Non è la RAI on Italia 1. After this experience, she appeared in the Canale 5 show Striscia la notizia, where she acted in the role of "Velina"; she took part also to the Canale 5 show Doppio lustro.

In 1997, Mancini appeared in the music video Born to Be Abramo of Elio e le Storie Tese. In 1998 she took part in Simpaticissima on Rete 4, and the next year in La ruota della fortunaon Rete 4 and Scherzi a parte on Canale 5.

From 1999 to 2002 she was a co-protagonist in Passaparola, Italian version of The Alphabet Game, quiz hosted by Gerry Scotti. In 2000 Alessia Mancini co-hosted, with Gerry Scotti, Un disco per l'estate on Canale 5; the next year sho co-hosted Facce da quiz on Canale 5. In 2000 and in 2002 she took part in La sai l'ultima? on Canale 5.

Mancini made her music debut in 2001 with Angel Bahia. In 2002 Alessia Mancini hosted Bande sonore on Italia 1. In 2002 she played a role (Ada) in Gian Burrasca directed by Maurizio Pagnussat. From 2002 to 2003, she was in the cast of Mezzogiorno in famiglia, television show on Rai 2. In 2003 she played a role (Giulia Ferri) in Tutti i sogni del mondo, television series directed by Paolo Poeti.

In 2004, she took part in La sai l'ultima? VIP on Canale 5 and il gioco dei 9, the Italian TV version of the American game show Hollywood Squares, on Italia 1 network. The next year she was a contestant of La talpa 2, reality show on Italia 1.

From 2006 to 2007, she was a co-protagonist in Stranamore television program on Rete 4 In 2007 Alessia Mancini co-hosted Telethon on Rai 2 and she played a role (Anna) in the film Natale in crociera directed by Neri Parenti. The next year she played a role (Martha Arcuati) in television series Don Matteo (episode 6x04 La stanza di un angelo).

From 2009 to 2010, Mancini hosted Tendenza casa on Leonardo. In 2013 she hosted a reportage on Sì Sposaitalia - Reality in passerella on La sposa TV.

From 2006 to 2018, Mancini took part in Caduta libera, the Italian television version of Who's Still Standing? on Canale 5. In 2018 she was semifinalist of L'isola dei famosi 13, reality show on Canale 5 In this year she took part in Avanti un altro! pure di sera on Canale 5.

In 2019, Mancini she took part in Guess My Age - Indovina l'età on TV8 and she hosted In salotto on TV8.

In 2023, She participated on Rai 1 show " E Sempre Mezzogiorno "

== Personal life ==
Mancini is married to actor Flavio Montrucchio who appeared as a contestant and won on the second edition of Italian Big Brother, the Italian version of the American television reality series Big Brother. Montrucchio also appears on the Italian TV soap opera series CentoVetrine. The couple, who married on 11 October 2003 in Rome, have two children.

== Television ==
- Non è la RAI (Italia 1, 1994–1995)
- Striscia la notizia (Canale 5, 1997–1998)
- Doppio lustro (Canale 5, 1998)
- Simpaticissima (Rete 4, 1998)
- La ruota della fortuna (Rete 4, 1999)
- Scherzi a parte (Canale 5, 1999)
- Passaparola (Canale 5, 1999–2002)
- Un disco per l'estate (Canale 5, 2000)
- La sai l'ultima? (Canale 5, 2000–2002)
- Facce da quiz (Canale 5, 2001)
- Bande sonore (Italia 1, 2002)
- Mezzogiorno in famiglia (Rai 2, 2002–2003)
- La sai l'ultima? VIP (Canale 5, 2004)
- Il gioco dei 9 (Italia 1, 2004)
- La talpa 2 (Italia 1, 2005)
- Stranamore (Rete 4, 2006–2007)
- Telethon (Rai 2, 2007)
- Tendenze casa (Leonardo, 2009–2010)
- Sì Sposaitalia - Reality in passerella (La sposa TV, 2013)
- Caduta libera (Canale 5, 2016–2018)
- L'isola dei famosi 13 (Canale 5, 2018)
- Avanti un altro! pure di sera (Canale 5, 2018)
- Guess My Age - Indovina l'età (TV8, 2019)
- In salotto (TV8, 2019)
- E Sempre Mezzogiorno (RAI 1 (Italian TV channel), 2023)

== Filmography ==
=== Cinema ===
- Natale in crociera, directed by Neri Parenti (2007)

=== Television ===
- Gian Burrasca, directed by Maurizio Pagnussat (2002)
- Tutti i sogni del mondo, directed by Paolo Poeti (2003)
- Don Matteo, episode 6x04 (2008)

=== Music videos ===
- Born to Be Abramo by Elio e le Storie Tese (1997)

== Discography ==
- 2001 - Angel Bahia

== Advertising campaigns ==
- Bon Bons of Malizia
- Boccadamo Gioielli
- Fairy Active Caps
- Acqua Sant'Anna
- Widiba
- Chateau d'Ax
- Auricchio
- Acqua & Sapone
- Rigoni di Asiago
- Balocco
- Optima
- Permaflex
- Guam
- Postepay 2019
- And others for Mediaset
