= 2006 in Italian television =

This is a list of Italian television related events from 2006.

== Events ==
- 6 January – The 2004 Miss Italia Cristina Chiabotto and her partner Raimondo Todaro win the second season of Ballando con le stelle.
- 27 April – Augusto De Megni wins the sixth season of Grande Fratello.

== Debuts ==
=== Miniseries ===
- Raccontami ("Tell me the story") – by Riccardo Donna and Tiziana Aristarco, with Massimo Ghini and Lunetta Savino; 2 seasons. Italian version of the Spanish Cuéntame cómo pasó.

==== Serials ====
- L’ispettore Coliandro ("Inspector Coliandro") – by the Manetti bros, with Giampaolo Morelli; 7 seasons. The series has for protagonist Marco Coliandro (created by Carlo Lucarelli), a young police inspector in Bologna, seemingly a "tough guy" but actually naïve and bungling.

=== International ===
- 2 October – (United States) / (Canada) Get Ed (Rai 2) (2005–2006)
- (United Kingdom) / (Canada) / (France) The Baskervilles (Boing) (2000)

== Television shows ==
=== Drama ===
- Bartali: The iron man, by Alberto Negrin, with Pierfrancesco Favino in the title role and Simone Gandolfo as Fausto Coppi; 2 episodes.

=== Variety ===
- Ballando con le stelle (2005–present)

=== Mediaset ===
- Grande Fratello (2000–present)

== Networks and services ==
=== Launches ===
| Network | Type | Launch date | Notes | Source |
|---|---|---|---|---|
| Repubblica TV | Cable and satellite | 10 April | | |
| FX | Cable and satellite | 21 May | | |
| E! | Cable and satellite | Summer | | |
| Next:HD | Cable and satellite | 10 July | | |
| Sky Sport Arena HD | Cable and satellite | 10 July | | |
| Sky Sport Football HD | Cable and satellite | 10 July | | |
| Sky Show | Cable and satellite | 12 December | | |

=== Closures ===
| Network | Type | Closure date | Notes | Source |
|---|---|---|---|---|
| Happy Channel | Cable and satellite | 1 January | | |

== See also ==
- List of Italian films of 2006
