= Antonella Mosetti =

- Born: Antonella Mosetti; January 8, 1975 (age 51); Rome, Italy
- Occupations: Showgirl; television personality; model
- Years active: 1993 - present
- Spouse: Alessandro Nuccetelli (1995-?)
- Children: Asia Nuccetelli (b. 10-9-1996)

Antonella Mosetti (born 1 August 1975, in Rome) is an Italian showgirl, model and television presenter.

== Biography ==
Mosetti debuted in 1993 acting in the movie Le donne non vogliono più, directed by Pino Quartullo. In September of the same year started working in Non è la RAI, an afternoon show aired by Italia 1 where she danced and sang with other girls. Mosetti remained in that show until June 1995, when it ends; in the same month Mosetti married Alessandro Nuccetelli, with whom she had her daughter Asia Nuccetelli (born on 10 September 1996) before separating themselves. Their marriage was aired by Italia 1 in June 1995 in the television event Fiori d'arancio a Non è la Rai. In 1997 Mosetti acted in the TV movie Mamma per caso, with Raffaella Carrà, and in the autumn of 1998 Mosetti came back in Mediaset as main dancer of the primetime show Ciao Darwin, hosted by Paolo Bonolis. In 2000 Mosetti recited in the film C'era un cinese in coma, directed by Carlo Verdone, and in the summer of 2001 Mosetti debuted as television host in the Canale 5 show Paperissima Sprint, with Mike Bongiorno. In the season 2001/2002 Mosetti was in the cast of Quelli che... aspettano, hosted by Simona Ventura and aired on Rai 2. In the season 2002/2003 Mosetti hosted with Massimo Giletti the Rai 1 afternoon show Casa Raiuno.

In 2004 Mosetti presented with Pino Insegno and Giulia Montanarini Compagni di squola on Rai 2.

During the season 2004/2005 has presented the Sunday morning show La domenica del villaggio, with Davide Mengacci, aired by Retequattro, and the year after started hosting the magazine Sipario del TG4. In September 2005 has participated to the event show Non è la Rai - Speciale, produced by Happy Channel.

In 2006/2007 season was the main dancer of Quelli che... il calcio, until April 2007, when she was replaced by Federica Ridolfi after a dispute with the presenter of the show, Simona Ventura. In the same season hosted also the Castrocaro Music Festival.

In 2009 joined the theatrical comedy troupe Bagaglino as primadonna; the show, titled Bellissima - Cabaret anticrisi, was also aired by Canale 5 in the primetime of Saturday.

=== Personal life ===
From 2007 to 2012 Antonella Mosetti was engaged to the fencer Aldo Montano.

== Filmography ==
=== As an actress ===
Year	Title	Role	Notes
1993	Un vampiro a Miami	Young woman	Cameo appearance
1993	Women Don't Want To	Brunette girl	Cameo appearance
1997	Mamma per caso	Margherita	Miniseries (4 episodes)
2000	A Chinese in a Coma	Female driver	Cameo appearance
2001	Prigionieri di un incubo	Antonella	
2006	Yo-Rhad - Un amico dallo spazio	Bernice (voice)	Voice role

=== As herself ===
Year	Title	Role	Notes
1993–1995	Non è la RAI	Herself	Variety show (seasons 3–4)
1998–2000	Ciao Darwin	Herself/ Dancer	Variety show (seasons 1–3)
2001	Paperissima Sprint	Herself/ Co-host	Comedy show (season 5)
2002–2003	Casa Raiuno	Herself/ Host	Variety show (season 1)
2004	Compagni di squola	Herself/ Co-host	Game show
2006–2007	Quelli che... il Calcio	Herself/ Dancer	Variety show (season 13)
2016	Grande Fratello VIP	Herself	Contestant (season 1)
2019	All Together Now	Herself/ Judge	Talent show (season 1)
2019–2021	Live - Non è la D'Urso	Herself/ Recurring guest	Talk show
