= Grande Fratello VIP season 1 =

Grande Fratello VIP
- Season 1
- Presented by: Ilary Blasi
- No. of days: 50
- No. of housemates: 14
- Winner: Alessia Macari
- Runner-up: Gabriele Rossi

Release
- Original network: Canale 5
- Original release: 19 September – 7 November 2016

Season chronology
- Next → Season 2

Grande Fratello VIP (as known by the acronym GFVIP) is the celebrity version of the Italian reality television franchise Big Brother. It's the first season of the show, it was launched on September 19, 2016 on Canale 5, with Ilary Blasi as presentator of the grand gala show on air every Monday evening, and Alfonso Signorini as opinionist. The 24h live was broadcast on Mediaset Extra and Mediaset Premium, daily pillows were broadcast on Canale 5 and La5. The show was scheduled to air for 8 weeks. The winner was Alessia Macari.

== Housemates ==
The age of the housemates refers to the time of entry into the house.

Housemates	Age	Birthplace	Famous for...	Day entered	Day exited	Status
Alessia Macari	22	Dublin, Ireland	Television personality	1	50	Winner
Gabriele Rossi	28	Alatri	Actor and Dancer	1	50	Runner-up
Valeria Marini	49	Rome	Model, Actress, Showgirl, Fashion designer	1	50	3rd Place
Stefano Bettarini	44	Forlì	Former footballer	1	50	4th Place
Laura Freddi	44	Rome	Showgirl, Presenter and Actress	1	50	8th Evicted
Andrea Damante	26	Gela	Personality (tronista) of Uomini e Donne	1	43	7th Evicted
Elenoire Casalegno	40	Savona	Television presenter	1	43	6th Evicted
Mariana Rodriguez	25	Caracas, Venezuela	Model, Showgirl and Actress	1	43	5th Evicted
Bosco Cobos	29	Málaga, Spain	Actor and Commentator	1	36	4th Evicted
Antonella Mosetti	41	Rome	Showgirl, Model and Television presenter	1	36	3rd Evicted
Asia Nuccetelli	20	Rome	TV Personality; Antonella Mosetti's daughter	1	29	2nd Evicted
Pamela Prati	58	Ozieri	Actress, Showgirl, Model, Singer and Television hostess	1	22	Ejected
Clemente Russo	34	Caserta	Amateur boxing	1	15	Ejected
Costantino Vitagliano	42	Milan	TV personality and Actor	1	8	1st Evicted

== Nominations table ==
Blue team (Week 1 - 2)
Red team (Week 1 - 2)

	Week 1	Week 2	Week 3	Week 4	Week 5		Week 6		Week 7	Final		Nominations received
	Week 1	Week 2	Week 3	Week 4	Day 29	Day 36	Day 36	Day 43	Week 7	Final		Nominations received
Alessia	Stefano	Antonella & Asia	Laura	Asia	Valeria; Antonella	Exempt	Laura; Valeria	Exempt	Valeria	Valeria	Winner (Day 50)	6
Gabriele	Costantino	Clemente	Antonella & Asia	Asia	Antonella; Bosco	Bosco	Stefano; Valeria	Andrea	Valeria	Stefano	Runner-Up (Day 50)	6
Valeria	Mariana	Mariana	Pamela	Antonella; Mariana	Antonella; Mariana	Nominated	Stefano; Mariana	Andrea	Gabriele	Stefano	Third Place (Day 50)	14
Stefano	Pamela	Alessia	Gabriele	Asia	Antonella; Gabriele	Valeria	Valeria; Ganriele	Andrea	Valeria	Valeria	Fourth Place (Day 50)	4
Laura	Mariana	Clemente	Antonella & Asia	Asia	Mariana; Antonella	Saved	Valeria; Mariana	Andrea	Valeria	Evicted (Day 50)		12
Andrea	Alessia	Pamela	Pamela	Asia	Mariana; Antonella	Saved	Valeria; Mariana	Stefano	Evicted (Day 43)			1
Elenoire	Pamela	Alessia	Antonella & Asia	Asia	Antonella; Mariana	Valeria	Valeria; Laura	Evicted (Day 43)				0
Mariana	Costantino	Laura	Valeria	Valeria	Valeria; Laura	Valeria	Gabriele; Valeria	Evicted (Day 43)				13
Bosco	Pamela	Antonella & Asia	Laura	Gabriele	Antonella; Laura	Nominated	Evicted (Day 36)					2
Antonella	Pamela	Alessia	Stefano	Laura	Andrea; Laura	Evicted (Day 36)						9
Asia	Pamela	Alessia	Stefano	Laura	Evicted (Day 29)							6
Pamela	Alessia	Alessia	Laura	Ejected (Day 22)								7
Clemente	Mariana	Mariana	Ejected (Day 15)									2
Costantino	Gabriele	Evicted (Day 8)										2
Notes	1	1, 2, 3	4,5	6	7,8	9	none	10,11,12	13	14	15	
Nominated For Eviction	Alessia; Costantino; Mariana; Pamela	Alessia; ~~Antonella & Asia~~; Clemente; Mariana	Antonella & Asia; Laura; Pamela	Antonella; Asia	Alessia; Antonella; Bosco; Gabriele; Laura; Valeria	Bosco; Valeria	Mariana; Valeria	Elenoire; Stefano	Gabriele; Laura	Stefano; Gabriele	Alessia; Gabriele	
Nominated For Eviction	Alessia; Costantino; Mariana; Pamela	Alessia; ~~Antonella & Asia~~; Clemente; Mariana	Antonella & Asia; Laura; Pamela	Antonella; Asia	Antonella; Laura; Mariana	Bosco; Valeria	Mariana; Valeria	Andrea; Stefano	Gabriele; Laura	Gabriele; Valeria	Alessia; Gabriele	
Ejected	none	Clemente	Pamela	none								
Evicted	Costantino; 41.8% to evict	Eviction cancelled	Eviction cancelled	Asia; 82.2% to evict	Alessia; 38.7% to be finalist	Bosco; 51.1% to evict	Mariana; 56.6% to evict	Elenoire; 56.9% to evict	Laura; 32.6% to be finalist	Stefano; 63.1% to evict	Gabriele; 47.54% to win	
Evicted	Costantino; 41.8% to evict	Eviction cancelled	Eviction cancelled	Asia; 82.2% to evict	Antonella; 51.9% to evict	Bosco; 51.1% to evict	Mariana; 56.6% to evict	Andrea; 48.4% to be finalist	Laura; 32.6% to be finalist	Valeria; 58.3% to evict	Gabriele; 47.54% to win	
Survived	Pamela; 30.0% Mariana; 23.9% Alessia; 4.3%	Eviction cancelled	Eviction cancelled	Antonella; 17.8%	Bosco; 21.6% Gabriele; 15.4% Valeria; 15.2% Antonella; 6.1% Laura; 3.0% to be finalist	Valeria; 48.9%	Valeria; 43.4%	Stefano; 43.1% to evict	Gabriele; 67.4% to be finalist	Gabriele; 36.9%	Alessia; 52.46% to win	
Survived	Pamela; 30.0% Mariana; 23.9% Alessia; 4.3%	Eviction cancelled	Eviction cancelled	Antonella; 17.8%	Mariana; 25.3% Laura; 22.8%	Valeria; 48.9%	Valeria; 43.4%	Stefano; 51.6% to be finalist	Gabriele; 67.4% to be finalist	Gabriele; 41.7%	Alessia; 52.46% to win	

=== Note ===
- ^Note 1 : Housemates are divided into two teams. Red team: Clemente, Costantino, Gabriele, Laura, Valeria and Mariana; Blue team: Alessia, Andrea, Antonella & Asia, Bosco, Elenoire, Pamela and Stefano. Housemates only able to nominate one housemate from their team.
- ^Note 2 : Andrea is the winner of the challenge, he got the power to save one housemate from eviction. He chose to save Antonella & Asia. Alessia, Clemente and Mariana are still nominated.
- ^Note 3 : Clemente was ejected due to his homophobic and misogynistic sentences.
- ^Note 4 : Alessia is the winner of the challenge. Mariana got the immunity.
- ^Note 5 : Pamela was ejected because she does not observed the rules shared by the program.
- ^Note 6 : Valeria is the winner of the challenge. Housemates got the power to save one housemate from elimination: Antonella, Asia and Laura were at risk. Valeria chose Antonella as the first nominated of the week.
- ^Note 7 : Housemates nominated a housemate each one: Alessia, Antonella, Bosco, Gabriele, Laura, Valeria were the most nominated and both went to the televoting. The first who got most votes was chosen as a finalist.
- ^Note 8 : Bosco is the winner of the challenge. He got a power: his nominations worth 2 votes each one.
- ^Note 9 : As a group, four male housemates had to nominate two female housemates. As a group, four female housemates had to nominate two male housemates. Andrea, Bosco, Laura and Valeria were the four potential nominees. The four housemates not nominated had to make a nomination, they could only choose one of the nominees. Valeria and Bosco received the most nominations therefore facing public vote.
- ^Note 10 : Andrea, Elenoire, Gabriele, Laura have chosen to side with Valeria, while Stefano with Mariana. Valeria, as winner of the televoting against Mariana, nominated Elenoire. Both Eleonoire and Stefano facing public vote.
- ^Note 11 : Andrea was the most nominated by the housemates: he got the right to be a finalist. Andrea chosen another housemate to fight for the title. Andrea and Stefano facing public vote.
- ^Note 12 : Housemates chosen the third finalist: Valeria was the most nominated.
- ^Note 13 : Gabriele and Laura facing the public vote: who receives most votes is the fourth finalist.
- ^Note 14 : Alessia and Stefano nominated Valeria. Valeria and Gabriele nominated Stefano. Both Stefano and Valeria picked a card, Stefano went to televoting, but he chosen to go with Gabriele. Gabriele won the televoting, he chosen to go in a further televoting against Valeria.
- ^Note 15 : At the final round, the public were voting to win rather than to evict.

== TV Ratings ==
The live show was broadcast on Canale 5 every Monday evening for about 4 hours.

Episode	Date	Viewers	Share
1	19 September 2016	3.844.000	21.62%
2	26 September 2016	3.209.000	17.69%
3	3 October 2016	4.157.000	21.62%
4	10 October 2016	4.461.000	23.26%
5	17 October 2016	4.060.000	21.12%
6	24 October 2016	4.462.000	22.30%
Semifinal	31 October 2016	3.711.000	19.90%
Final	7 November 2016	5.050.000	26.36%
Average		4.119.250	21.73%
