= Sky Show =

- Country: Italy

Programming
- Picture format: 4:3 SDTV

Ownership
- Owner: Sky Italia

History
- Launched: 12 December 2006
- Replaced: MTV.it
- Closed: 21 April 2009

Sky Show was a channel on satellite TV, owned by Sky Italia and broadcast on channel 116.

The channel mainly had comedic content, including the show Shake It (produced by the channel itself), and Scherzi a parte taken from the Happy Channel. Channel also featured sitcoms and international programs. Its slogan was Si fa per ridere (It makes for a laugh). On 21 April 2009 the channel was closed down after Sky Vivo was relaunched as Sky Uno. By 1 August 2015 they replaced the channel by a relaunched version of MTV Italy called MTV.it.

== TV series ==
- Aída
- H
- Rodney
- Crumb
- Radio Sex
- Moonlighting
- Tre cuori in affitto
- Absolutely Fabulous
- Green Wing
- Sport Night
- Weeds
- Cuori senza età
- Birra e patatine
- Samantha Oups!

== Show ==
- Shake It
- Geppi Hour
- Scherzi a parte Remix
- Seven Show

== Films ==
- Funny and Gay movies (every Friday evening at 9 pm - 2007)

== Reality shows ==
- Since 12 January 2009 it has been broadcasting Grande Fratello 9 live 24 hours a day
