= Seven and a Half =

Seven and a Half may refer to:

- Seven and a half, a card game
- Seven and a Half (2006 film), a Serbian dark comedy film
- Seven and a Half (2019 film), an Iranian drama film
