= Non è la Rai =

Italian variety television show, 1991–1995

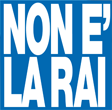
- Created by: Gianni Boncompagni
- Presented by: Enrica Bonaccorti; Paolo Bonolis; Ambra Angiolini
- Country of origin: Italy

Production
- Executive producers: Mariella Meloni; Luca Del Buono; Marco Palenga
- Producer: Corrado Grego
- Running time: 60–90 minutes

Original release
- Network: Canale 5 (1991–92); Italia 1 (1993–95)
- Release: 9 September 1991 – 30 June 1995

Non è la Rai ('It's not Rai') is an Italian variety television series that aired from 9 September 1991 to 30 June 1995. Initially broadcast by Canale 5, it was moved to Italia 1 in January 1993. The show was presented by Enrica Bonaccorti in its first season, Paolo Bonolis in the second and Ambra Angiolini in the third and fourth.

Produced by Gianni Boncompagni, the show was broadcast every day in the afternoon, starring 100 girls between 14 and 22 years old who sang, danced and presented some telephone competitions. The show created scandal in Italy due to the girls' age and some political declarations by Angiolini, who was 17 years old in 1994. The show was presented by Enrica Bonaccorti in its first season, Paolo Bonolis in the second and Ambra Angiolini in the third and fourth.

From the show came many Italian television, music and theatre stars such as Angiolini, Pamela Petrarolo, Claudia Gerini, Romina Mondello, Nicole Grimaudo, Antonella Elia, Yvonne Sciò, Alessia Merz, Alessia Mancini, Antonella Mosetti, Emanuela Panatta, Laura Freddi, Miriana Trevisan, Gloria Scotti, Cristina Quaranta, Sabrina Impacciatore, Barbara Lelli and Letizia Catinari.

The program was rebroadcast on the Happy Channel on satellite TV some years after its end and in the digital channel Mediaset Extra from 2011.

== History ==
=== First edition ===
The program was created in 1991 and the first edition aired throughout the 1991/1992 season on Canale 5 starting on 9 September at 12:40, immediately after Il pranzo è servito, hosted by Enrica Bonaccorti with the participation of Antonella Elia and Yvonne Sciò. The program marked the debut of director Gianni Boncompagni (who had already directed Bonaccorti in Pronto, chi gioca?) on the television networks of the Fininvest group. Regarding the title, he denied any polemical intent and stated that he had been inspired by the song No, non è la BBC from his old radio program Alto gradimento.

The set design of the variety show represented the four seasons (one for each side of the studio, with a swimming pool placed on the summer side) and was enriched by the presence of a large group of girls, initially about eighty, almost all of whom came from the editions of Domenica in directed by the same director in previous years. At first they were relegated to the role of chorus or at most performed small musical interludes and dance routines between one game and another, such as the contest More contro Bionde in which two small groups composed of some of them, precisely brunettes and blondes (captained respectively by Yvonne Sciò and Antonella Elia), competed in songs and choreographies. During the first phase of the program some girls were highlighted and were given the opportunity to perform by interpreting some songs or medleys using their own voice, in playback, namely Elena Moretti, Sabrina Marinangeli, Valentina Ducros and, occasionally, the trio of twin sisters Desi, Monia and Tania Medda. Finally, the cast was completed by two child assistants: Martina Melli, who remained for the entire season, and Micaela Ilardo, who instead left the program after a few months.

Another distinctive element of the studio was the aforementioned swimming pool, where some telephone games took place and where some girls, during the episode, dived and bathed; starting from the third edition, however, it was used less and less until it remained only as a mere scenic decoration in the fourth and final edition, also due to protests concerning the clothing worn by the girls (in the case of the pool scenes they were in swimsuits).

A few months after the start of the broadcast, some changes were made to the structure of the show: Yvonne Sciò, who initially hosted a section dedicated to children, left the program to devote herself exclusively to cinema, while Antonella Elia and Miriana Trevisan were entrusted with animating the Cruciverbone (also a game already used by Boncompagni in the editions of Domenica in he directed), in which the viewer at home, on the phone with Bonaccorti, had to fill in horizontal and vertical words by answering the questions asked. Later the authors decided to highlight other girls, who thus increasingly became the central characters of the program, as happened with Laura Freddi, who was brought to the public's attention because of her resemblance to actress Kim Basinger and who was made to perform a chaste striptease inspired by the one performed by Basinger in the famous film 9½ Weeks. Freddi later replaced the Elia-Trevisan pair during the Cruciverbone segment. At the same time, Francesca Pettinelli, Claudia Gerini, Antonella Elia and Freddi herself were given the opportunity to perform by interpreting some songs or medleys using their own voice in playback, unlike other girls who were given the same opportunity but were dubbed by some backing vocalists because they did not excel in singing.

Much of the show consisted of telephone games, which often accompanied the moments of telepromotions; among the most remembered games was that of Sette e mezzo, with Antonella Elia assisted by Martina Melli, during which 40 girls held as many playing cards with which the contestant at home had to attempt to win. Other girls were also given speaking roles to assist Bonaccorti in some telephone games: Giorgia Ghezzi in the game Il soprannome di Giorgia, and Anne May Montonen in the game linked to the sponsor of a fruit juice brand. Trevisan herself had the opportunity to host the game of Sette e mezzo in some episodes in which Elia was absent because she was busy with rehearsals for the 1992 edition of the Telegatti.

The program continued, with a reduction of 30 minutes, starting at 13:20 immediately after the newly launched TG5 (from 13 January 1992), giving increasing importance to the girls, who thus became the real protagonists of the show to the detriment of the official host, who by the end of the season was relegated to hosting only some games. Bonaccorti herself, after not being confirmed as host for the following edition, announced a temporary retirement from television. In addition, the cast was characterized by the presence of only two men: the fake lifeguard Bob (real name Roberto Tron), who arrived on the program through participation in a televendita advertising a shoe brand and remained until the last season, and Davide Mengacci, who presented the mail segment.

At the end of the season, which concluded on 27 June, it became evident that the target audience of the broadcast, initially identified as housewives (Non è la Rai had initially been conceived as a Fininvest version of famous successful programs of the Rai such as Pronto, Raffaella? and Pronto, chi gioca?), had gradually shifted to a decidedly younger audience.

Several spin-offs were also derived during this edition, such as Primadonna, broadcast on Italia 1 in the early evening slot, hosted by Eva Robin's and Antonello Piroso with the participation of Claudia Gerini, which was interrupted after just two months due to low ratings, some prime-time specials, the New Year's Eve celebrations of Canale 5, and Bulli e pupe, hosted in prime time by Paolo Bonolis in the summer of 1992, in which several new girls were introduced (including Ambra Angiolini, Lucia Ocone, Annalisa Mandolini, Romina Mondello, Francesca Gollini, Emanuela Panatta, Daniela Giagheddu, Alessia Gioffi and Roberta Modigliani) who would then participate in the subsequent edition of the parent program; also during the summer of 1992 a "best of" of the just-concluded edition was broadcast, titled Non è la Rai estate and proposed on Canale 5 in the same time slot.

The theme song of the first edition, also reused for the first part of the second, particularly remained memorable. It had the same title as the program and was written by Cristiano Minellono and Gianni Boncompagni with music by Paolo Ormi.

=== Second edition ===
On 14 September 1992 the second season began, hosted by Paolo Bonolis, who replaced Bonaccorti after the summer experience of Bulli e pupe. In addition to the presenter, the set design was also taken from the summer show and, instead of the four seasons, only summer was represented, characterized by a blue background, light-blue sky, sand, fake palm trees and a new swimming pool, much larger than the one of the previous year. The program returned to air on Canale 5, after a summer in which the channel had broadcast the best moments of the just-finished edition under the title Non è la Rai - Estate.

One of the main novelties was the initial participation in the program, in an active role, of the director and creator Boncompagni, who occupied a segment of the episode interacting with an improbable Cinderella played by a very young Riccardo Rossi in some comic sketches. Otherwise, the show continued following the model of the previous season, with many telephone games but leaving more space for the girls' singing performances. In this first phase of the program two girls were given the opportunity to host two telephone games linked to sponsors: Tiziana Sensi and a debuting Annalisa Mandolini.

On 16 November 1992 the broadcast was struck by a tragic event: one of the young protagonists of the program, Marina Musti, who had joined the cast only a few months earlier, was killed in a car accident while returning from a night at a disco with some friends. The broadcast did not air the following day nor on the day of her funeral as a sign of respect and to allow the girls to attend the funeral of their colleague.

On 11 January 1993 the program underwent a drastic change and moved to Italia 1, increasing its duration and occupying the time slot between 14:15 and 16:00, while before the change of channel the average share had been 17%, with peaks of about 3 million viewers.

The presence of Bonolis on screen, which among other things was attracting attention because at that time the host had begun a romantic relationship with Laura Freddi, one of the protagonists of the program, became, by choice of the director, increasingly limited: in the last months of the broadcast Bonolis was effectively confined to hosting only the spaces of some advertisements, and during the season some girls obtained the hosting of entire blocks of the program. Among them the most prominent were:

- Ambra Angiolini, who, seated on a white armchair, hosted il gioco dello zainetto, in which the viewer who called had to guess ten objects contained in Ambra's backpack, remembering those already guessed by previous players; later she was also entrusted with il gioco dei cassetti musicali, assisted by Romina Mondello.
- Francesca Gollini, who presented both il gioco della metamorfosi, in which contestants had to understand into which character a photograph was transforming through morphing, and il gioco delle secchiate (initially linked to the sponsor Dietorelle) in which viewers had to choose which of four randomly selected girls should pull a handle at the top of which was placed a bucket, expecting either a shower of candies (later replaced by flowers) or, more frequently, icy water.
- Roberta Modigliani, who hosted a quiz on anagrams with living letters formed by about ten girls from the program (a game already proposed in the previous edition with Bonaccorti).
- Mary Patti – already Miss Linea Sprint Roma 1990 at the Miss Italia finals (as Maria Patti) – who, perched on a very high stool, played the role of the femme fatale while hosting il gioco del nome della nonna (whose answer, after months of attempts, turned out to be the improbable name "Mosqu").

Later other girls were also highlighted, such as Alessia Merz, with il gioco del desiderio espresso il giorno del suo diciottesimo compleanno, and Miriana Trevisan and Ilaria Galassi, both already very active in the first edition, respectively in the game with the philosophical question perché viviamo? and in the gioco del walkman, in which viewers had to guess which song Galassi was listening to. Laura Freddi and Micaela Bernardoni hosted two telephone games linked to sponsors.

During this edition the number of singing performances increased and a fake permanent orchestra composed of about twenty girls was introduced. The program also became a commercial phenomenon: the first two records connected with the show were released, the first reaching second place in the Italian album chart. Notebooks and T-shirts featuring the faces of the most popular girls were also sold.

Entire blocks of the broadcast featured the cast dancing to Please Don't Go, a song by the Eurodance group Double You, which had been a major summer hit of 1992.

As in the previous year, the countdown to 1993 on Canale 5 was entrusted to the afternoon program with a special late-night episode, while from January to April 1993 the early evening slot of Italia 1 hosted Rock 'n' Roll, hosted by Orietta Berti. Initially conceived as an acrobatic rock-and-roll competition, it later became an evening offshoot of Non è la Rai hosted by the girls themselves without Berti. Only in this edition did Valentino Palmentieri participate, a fake policeman particularly skilled at acrobatic dancing.

=== Third edition ===
Starting with the third edition, broadcast between 1993 and 1994, the program was no longer hosted by a presenter with previous experience: Boncompagni decided to entrust the program to the girls themselves, who in the previous two years had increasingly taken center stage, relegating Bonaccorti and later Bonolis to the background. In particular, the choice fell on Ambra Angiolini, actually guided through an earpiece by the director himself, who suggested word for word what she had to repeat. Boncompagni appreciated her spontaneity and ability to quickly rework what was dictated to her during the live broadcast.

Much of the attention of the mass media during this third season focused precisely on the fifteen-year-old Ambra (actually sixteen, but the production declared her a year younger), who, following the director's constant suggestions, played the role of a diva during the broadcast, leading a large group of girls who were also given the opportunity to perform in games, songs and sketches within the ninety-minute broadcast (from 14:30 to 16:00). Alongside Ambra Angiolini, who that television season won the Telegatto as breakthrough personality of the year, another notable success was Pamela Petrarolo, nicknamed The voice. Petrarolo, present since the first edition (she was one of the girls coming from Domenica in), after one season singing dubbed by the program's vocalists began recording songs presented on the show with her own voice and also had the opportunity to release a first solo album for the record label RTI Music, Io non vivo senza te, published in February 1994. The same opportunity was also given to Francesca Pettinelli, who at the end of the season released Dance with Francesca.

The edition was rich in humorous moments thanks to the sketches of the debuting comedian Lucia Ocone, who imitated various characters, and to Sabrina Impacciatore, who, in addition to reading the program's mail as she had already done in the previous edition, staged comic scenes and moderated il dibattito, a segment in which the girls discussed various topics, both light and serious. The sketches by Impacciatore also involved Tatiana Donati, Alessia Barela and Michela Andreozzi, who at the time was part of the program's editorial staff (as well as one of the vocalists who lent their voices to the various girls) and would later become a successful comedic actress.

This edition, however, also received many criticisms: the first heated controversies arose over the nature of the program and its content, involving even feminist movements. In response, on 8 March 1994, International Women's Day, the program aired an episode exceptionally recorded the day before instead of live, in which the protagonists wore wedding dresses.

This edition was the last rich in games, which in the following season would be almost completely eliminated. Among the most followed was the springtime gioco delle secchiate, already present in the previous edition, hosted by Ambra Angiolini assisted by Gu Shen. Other recurring games included il diario di Ambra, in which contestants from home had to guess what the host had done on 15 August 1993, and il gioco dei bambini ("The kid's game"), essentially an opportunity for very young viewers to talk with Ambra (a segment already present in the first edition, hosted by Yvonne Sciò). Only during the first weeks of the edition were other girls also given the opportunity to host some games, both telephone games and those with contestants in the studio, including Roberta Carrano, Marzia Aquilani, Tatiana Donati, Cristina Riccioti and a very young Valentina Abitini. Other girls were entrusted with hosting games linked to sponsors: Miriana Trevisan, Sabrina Impacciatore, Lucia Ocone, Francesca Gollini and the pair composed of Ilaria Galassi and Antonella Mosetti. Pamela Petrarolo hosted the gara di barzellette (joke contest); she also had the opportunity to replace Angiolini as host for a few episodes broadcast at the end of December 1993 when Angiolini was ill, and she was also the protagonist (in this season and the next) of some comic sketches imitating the singing performances of the other girls.

Also memorable was Batuca Gum, a musical piece to which the girls danced for several minutes just as they had done the previous year with Please Don't Go.

Particular scandal was caused by statements made by Ambra (again prompted by Boncompagni) during her daily chats with a virtual little devil (who communicated only through gestures) during the heated climate of the 1994 Italian general election in the spring of 1994, when she stated that according to the devil Satan supported Achille Occhetto while God supported Silvio Berlusconi.

This season also featured many famous guests, including Pippo Baudo, Bruno Vespa, Giuliano Ferrara, Fiorello, Vittorio Sgarbi and Maurizio Costanzo, all interviewed by the very young but outspoken Ambra. Several artists and musical groups performed in Studio 1 of the Centro Palatino, including Take That, New Kids on the Block, and Giorgia, who performed a duet with Pamela Petrarolo.

As reported by the media the following year, the success of the second and third editions allowed Italia 1 to more than triple the advertising rates requested for the 14:15–16:00 time slot, rising from 5.5 million lire in 1992 to 18 million lire in 1993 (for 30 seconds of advertising). The program's ratings during those seasons averaged between 13% and 14% share.

=== Fourth edition ===
The fourth and final edition of Non è la Rai aired between 1994 and 1995 and was again hosted by Ambra Angiolini, who had become the undisputed face of the program. The format underwent significant changes compared with previous years: the number of games was drastically reduced and greater emphasis was placed on musical performances and choreographies by the girls.

During this season Ambra Angiolini further consolidated her role as the central figure of the program, often opening and closing episodes with monologues and interacting with the group of girls, who had by then become a sort of permanent ensemble. The girls frequently performed choreographed dance routines and lip-synced songs, many of which were later released in compilation albums associated with the show.

The producers eventually decided to conclude the program after four seasons. The final episode aired in 1995, marking the end of a television phenomenon that had strongly influenced Italian popular culture in the early 1990s.

== Editions ==
Edition	Season	Host	Network	Time slot
1	1991–1992	Enrica Bonaccorti	Canale 5	12:40–14:00
2	1992–1993	Paolo Bonolis	Canale 5 / Italia 1	12:40–14:00 / 14:15–16:00
3	1993–1994	Ambra Angiolini	Italia 1	14:30–16:00
4	1994–1995	Ambra Angiolini	Italia 1	14:30–16:00

== The girls ==
Over the course of its four seasons, Non è la Rai featured a very large number of young performers, many of whom later pursued careers in entertainment. Among the most notable participants were:

- Ambra Angiolini
- Claudia Gerini
- Antonella Mosetti
- Laura Freddi
- Miriana Trevisan
- Alessia Merz
- Ilaria Galassi
- Pamela Petrarolo
- Romina Mondello
- Sabrina Impacciatore
- Lucia Ocone
- Roberta Carrano
- Francesca Pettinelli
- Francesca Gollini

Many other girls also took part in the program, often appearing in musical numbers, dance routines, and various segments of the broadcast.

== Singing performances ==
One of the most recognizable elements of the program consisted of the musical performances staged by the girls. These usually involved lip-syncing to popular songs or medleys, accompanied by choreographed dance routines. In some cases the girls sang with their own voices, although it later emerged that several performances had been dubbed by professional vocalists.

== Controversies ==
From its earliest seasons the program attracted significant criticism. Supporters emphasized its energetic format and its ability to launch the careers of many young entertainers, while the broadcast attracted criticism from commentators and cultural observers who questioned what they considered the excessive presence of numerous very young girls showcased on television in ways considered inappropriate. Feminist groups and cultural commentators occasionally criticized the show for what they saw as the objectification of minors. According to Cuter, on the show "half-naked underage girls naively played games, lip-synced to popular songs and danced on the studio set". The producers and creators defended the program by describing it as a playful and harmless entertainment show aimed primarily at young audiences.

== Foreign version ==
The concept of Non è la Rai inspired the Brazilian television network SBT, which produced a local version called Fantasia, aired between 1997 and 2000 and again between 2007 and 2008.
