= 2012 European Track Championships – Men's team pursuit =

Pursuit event

UEC European Champion jersey

The Men's team pursuit was held on 19 October 2012. 8 nations participated.

== Medalists ==
Gold	Russia; Artur Ershov; Alexei Markov; Alexander Serov; Valery Kaykov
Silver	Germany; Lucas Liss; Henning Bommel; Theo Reinhardt; Maximilian Beyer
Bronze	Italy; Elia Viviani; Paolo Simion; Liam Bertazzo; Ignazio Moser; Michele Scartezzini

== Results ==
Fastest 2 teams raced for gold and 3rd and 4th teams raced for bronze.

=== Qualifying ===
It was held at 13:35.

Rank	Name	Nation	Time	Notes
1	Artur Ershov; Alexei Markov; Alexander Serov; Valery Kaykov	Russia	4:01.802	Q
2	Lucas Liss; Henning Bommel; Theo Reinhardt; Maximilian Beyer	Germany	4:08.520	Q
3	Elia Viviani; Michele Scartezzini; Liam Bertazzo; Ignazio Moser	Italy	4:08.930	q
4	Silvan Dillier; Olivier Beer; Gabriel Chavanne; Théry Schir	Switzerland	4:10.729	q
5	Vitaliy Popkov; Maksym Polishchuk; Oleksandr Martynenko; Maksym Vasylyev	Ukraine	4:11.729	
6	Roman Furst; Ondrej Vendolsky; Jan Kaduch; František Sisr	Czech Republic	4:14.600	
7	Raman Tsishkou; Andrei Snitko; Aleh Ahiyevich; Anton Muzychkin	Belarus	4:17.531	
8	Mateusz Nowak; Mateusz Nowaczek; Wojciech Pszczolarski; Mateusz Mukulicz	Poland	4:17.730	

=== Finals ===
The finals were held at 19:45.

Rank	Name	Nation	Time
Gold Medal Race
1st place, gold medalist(s)	Artur Ershov; Alexei Markov; Alexander Serov; Valery Kaykov	Russia	4:00.641
2nd place, silver medalist(s)	Lucas Liss; Henning Bommel; Theo Reinhardt; Maximilian Beyer	Germany	OVL
Bronze Medal Race
3rd place, bronze medalist(s)	Elia Viviani; Paolo Simion; Liam Bertazzo; Ignazio Moser	Italy	4:06.380
4	Silvan Dillier; Olivier Beer; Gabriel Chavanne; Théry Schir	Switzerland	4:11.063
