= Ignazio Moser =

Italian cyclist

Personal information
- Born: 14 July 1992 (age 34) Trento, Italia
- Height: 194 cm (6 ft 4 in)
- Weight: 88 kg (194 lb)

Cycling career
- Sport: Cycling
- Current team: Retired
- Disciplines: Road; Track
- Role: Rider
- Rider type: Pursuitist (track)

Amateur teams
- 2012: Lucchini Maniva Ski
- 2012: U.C. Trevigiani–Dynamon–Bottoli
- 2013–2014: BMC Development Team
Medal record
Men's track cycling
Representing Italy
European Championships
Bronze medal – third place	2012 Panevėžys	Team pursuit

Ignazio Moser (born 14 July 1992) is an Italian former road and track cyclist.

== Biography ==
=== Career as entertainer ===
Best known as cyclist, after his retirement from competition in September 2014 Moser became an entertainer in the Italian showbusiness. Before entering in Mediaset Italia, in early 2017 Moser made his debut to comment the Giro d'Italia 2017 on Rai 1; in the same period Moser participated in the Rai 2 sport program La grande corsa as a commentator.

In the autumn of 2017 Moser appeared in the second season of the Grande Fratello VIP, the Italian adaptation (hosted by Ilary Blasi with Alfonso Signorini and aired on Canale 5) of the international franchise Celebrity Big Brother.

Moser appeared, in the spring of 2021, in the 15th season of the L'isola dei famosi, the Italian adaptation (hosted by Ilary Blasi, from the studio, with Massimiliano Rosolino, from the island) of the international franchise Survivor and aired on Canale 5.

Ignazio Moser, with his girlfriend Cecilia Rodriguez, took part, as a "special guest", in the sport program of Italia 1 Giù in 60 secondi - Adrenalina ad alta quota in late 2018 and the couple Ignazio-Cecilia also hosted the reality show of MTV Italia Ex on the Beach Italia in early 2020 (II season), in late 2021 (III season) and in late 2022 (IV season).

=== Career as cyclist ===
Moser was Italian junior individual pursuit champion and runner up in the Italian junior road race championships in 2010. Moser won the bronze medal at the 2012 European Track Championships in the men's team pursuit. Moser competed in the team pursuit event at the 2013 UCI Track Cycling World Championships. Moser announced in September 2014 his retirement from competition, following a final victory in a stage at the Tour de Guadeloupe the previous month (August 2014), citing a lack of motivation to continue, and indicating that he would look to gain some work experience before working in his family's vineyards and winery.

=== Personal life ===
Ignazio Moser is part of the Moser family of racing cyclists: he is the son of Francesco Moser, the nephew of Aldo Moser, Diego Moser and Enzo Moser, and the cousin of Leonardo Moser, Matteo Moser and Moreno Moser. During the second season of the reality show Grande Fratello VIP aired on Canale 5 in the autumn of 2017, Ignazio Moser started a relationship with fellow contestant Cecilia Rodríguez, model and sister of Belén Rodríguez, and this relationship created a stir in the Italian media.

== Television ==
- Giro d'Italia 2017 (Rai 1, 2017)
- La grande corsa (Rai 2, 2017)
- Grande Fratello VIP (Canale 5, 2017)
- Giù in 60 secondi - Adrenalina ad alta quota (Italia 1, 2018)
- Ex on the Beach Italia (MTV, 2020–2022)
- L'isola dei famosi (Canale 5, 2021)

== Major results ==
2010
2nd Road race, National Junior Road Championships
2011
1st Piccola Coppa Agostoni
2012
1st Gran Premio Polverini Arredamenti
3rd Team pursuit, European Track Championships
2013
1st Shimano Suzuka Road Race
2014
1st Memorial Lorenzo Mola
1st Stage 6 Tour de Guadeloupe
