= Grande Fratello VIP season 2 =

Grande Fratello VIP
- Season 2
- Presented by: Ilary Blasi
- No. of days: 85
- No. of housemates: 20
- Winner: Daniele Bossari
- Runner-up: Luca Onestini

Release
- Original network: Canale 5
- Original release: 11 September – 4 December 2017

Season chronology
- ← Previous; Season 1 Next → Season 3

Grande Fratello VIP 2 (as known by the acronym GFVIP2) is the second celebrity season of the Italian reality television franchise Grande Fratello.

It was launched on Monday 11 September 2017 on Canale 5, with Ilary Blasi as presentator of the grand gala show on air every week, and Alfonso Signorini as opinionist, and Gialappa's Band. It was ended on Monday 4 December 2017 and the winner was Daniele Bossari. The 24h live is broadcast on Mediaset Extra, daily pillows are broadcast on Canale 5, Italia 1 and La 5. The show was scheduled to air for 12 weeks.

== Housemates ==
The age of the housemates refers to the time of entry into the house.

Housemates	Age	Birthplace	Famous for...	Day entered	Day exited	Status
Daniele Bossari	42	Milan	TV presenter and Radio speaker	1	85	Winner
Luca Onestini	24	Castel San Pietro Terme	Model, Personality of Uomini e Donne	1	85	Runner-up
Ivana Mrázová	25	Vimperk, Czech Republic	Model, Sanremo Music Festival 2012 formerly co-presenter	1	85	3rd Place
Giulia De Lellis	21	Rome	Personality of Uomini e Donne	1	85	4th Place
Aída Yéspica	35	Barquisimeto, Venezuela	Showgirl, Model and Actress	1	85	5th Place
Raffaello Tonon	38	Milan	TV personality	36	85	14th Evicted
Cristiano Malgioglio	72	Ramacca	Singer and TV celebrity	1	78	13th Evicted
Lorenzo Flaherty	49	Rome	Actor	1	36	5th Evicted
Lorenzo Flaherty	49	Rome	Actor	36	78	12th Evicted
Ignazio Moser	25	Trento	Former Road and Track cyclist	1	78	11th Evicted
Cecilia Rodríguez	27	Pilar, Argentina	Model and showgirl, sister of Belén Rodríguez	1	71	10th Evicted
Jeremías Rodríguez	29	Pilar, Argentina	Model, brother of Belén Rodríguez	1	64	9th Evicted
Corinne Cléry	67	Paris, France	Actress	36	57	8th Evicted
Carmen Russo	58	Genoa	Showgirl	36	50	7th Evicted
Veronica Angeloni	31	Massa	Volleyball player	1	43	6th Evicted
Gianluca Impastato	45	Milan	Actor and Comedian	1	36	Ejected
Simona Izzo	64	Rome	Actress, Director, Screenwriter and Voice Actress	1	29	4th Evicted
Marco Predolin	66	Borgo Val di Taro	TV presenter and Radio speaker	1	22	Ejected
Carmen Di Pietro	52	Potenza	Showgirl	1	22	3rd Evicted
Serena Grandi	59	Bologna	Actress and TV celebrity	1	15	2nd Evicted
Carla Cruz	24	Quito, Ecuador	Model	1	8	1st Evicted

== Future Appearances ==
- In 2020, Cristiano Malgioglio returned for the fifth season of Grande Fratello VIP, where he placed 17th.
- In 2021, Carmen Russo returned for the sixth season of Grande Fratello VIP, where she placed 22nd.
- In 2021, Luca Onestini appeared as a contestant on the first season of the Spanish version of Secret Story, where he placed 1st. In 2022, he returned for the seventh season of Grande Fratello VIP, he's currently competing.

== Nominations table ==
Blue team (Week 1 - 3)
Red team (Week 1 - 3)
Immune

	Week 1	Week 2	Week 3	Week 4	Week 5	Week 6	Week 7	Week 8	Week 9	Week 10		Week 11		Week 12			Final				Nominations received
House Captain	none	Aída	Marco	Luca	Ignazio	Daniele	Cristiano	Cristiano	Raffaello		Giulia		none								Nominations received
Daniele	Ivana	Aída	Ignazio	Giulia	Aída	Exempt	Carmen R.	Raffaello	Giulia	Giulia	Cecilia; Ivana	Aída	Exempt				Nominated	Nominated	Winner (Day 85)		6
Luca	Carla	Lorenzo	Carmen D.	Exempt	Aída	Veronica	Carmen R.	Aída	Jeremias	Lorenzo	Aída; Cecilia	Raffaello	Cristiano; Ignazio	Nominated	Saved	Nominated	Finalist		Runner-up (Day 85)		11
Ivana	Gianluca	Serena	Daniele	Simona	Lorenzo	Jeremias	Carmen R.	Raffaello	Cristiano	Giulia	Cristiano; Lorenzo	Luca	Cristiano; Lorenzo	Saved	Nominated	Exempt	Finalist		Third Place (Day 85)		13
Giulia	Ivana	Serena	Daniele	Daniele	Lorenzo	Jeremias	Raffaello	Corinne	Daniele	Ignazio	Exempt	Ignazio; Daniele	Exempt				Finalist	Nominated	Fourth Place (Day 85)		2
Aída	Ignazio	Serena (x2)	Daniele	Simona	Lorenzo	Jeremias	Corinne	Corinne	Raffaello	Saved	Cristiano; Luca	Cristiano	Exempt				Nominated	Fifth place (Day 85)			12
Raffaello	Not in House					Exempt	Aída	Aída	Jeremias	Luca	Ignazio; Cecilia	Saved	Ignazio; Ivana	Saved	Saved	Nominated	Evicted (Day 85)				9
Cristiano	Ivana	Ivana	Gianluca	Lorenzo	Gianluca	Ivana	Exempt	Exempt	Ignazio	Aída	Ivana; Ignazio	Raffaello	Ignazio; Luca	Luca; Raffaello	Nominated	Evicted (Day 78)					10
Lorenzo	Luca	Marco	Simona	Simona	Veronica	Veronica	Aída	Corinne	Giulia	Saved	Ignazio; Ivana	Saved	Ignazio; Ivana	Nominated	Evicted (Day 78)						15
Ignazio	Gianluca	Serena	Daniele	Simona	Exempt	Veronica	Carmen R.	Raffaello	Cristiano	Cecilia	Raffaello; Cristiano	Aída	Cristiano; Lorenzo; Raffaello	Luca; Raffaello	Evicted (Day 78)						11
Cecilia	Carla	Marco	Simona	Simona	Lorenzo	Luca	Carmen R.	Lorenzo	Luca	Aída	Luca; Raffaello	Evicted (Day 71)									4
Jeremias	Carla	Marco	Simona	Simona	Aída	Ivana	Carmen R.	Luca	Luca; Raffaello	Evicted (Day 64)											4
Corinne	Not in House					Exempt	Aída	Aída	Evicted (Day 57)												4
Carmen R.	Not in House					Exempt	Aída	Evicted (Day 50)													6
Veronica	Carla	Lorenzo	Carmen	Simona	Lorenzo	Luca	Evicted (Day 43)														5
Gianluca	Ignazio	Serena	Cristiano	Cristiano	Lorenzo	Ejected (Day 36)															4
Simona	Carla	Lorenzo	Carmen D.	Lorenzo	Evicted (Day 29)																9
Carmen D.	Carla	Luca	Veronica	Evicted (Day 22)																	3
Marco	Carla	Cecilia & Jeremias	Exempt	Ejected (Day 22)																	2
Serena	Ivana	Ivana	Evicted (Day 15)																		6
Carla	Luca	Evicted (Day 8)																			6
Notes	1	1,2,3	1,4,5,6	7	8,9,10																
Nominated For Eviction	Carla; Gianluca; Ignazio; Ivana; Luca	Lorenzo; Serena	Carmen D. Daniele	Lorenzo; Simona	Aida; Lorenzo	Jeremias; Veronica	Aida; Carmen R.	Aida; Corinne; Raffaello	Cristiano; Giulia; Jeremias; Luca; Raffaello	Aida; Cristiano; Daniele; Giulia	Cecilia; Cristiano; Ignazio; Ivana	Aida; Daniele; Ignazio	Cristiano; Ignazio	Lorenzo; Luca	Cristiano; Ivana	Luca; Raffaello	Aída; Daniele	Daniele; Giulia	Daniele; Ivana; Luca		
Nominated For Eviction	Carla; Gianluca; Ignazio; Ivana; Luca	Lorenzo; Serena	Carmen D. Daniele	Lorenzo; Simona	Aida; Lorenzo	Jeremias; Veronica	Aida; Carmen R.	Jeremias	Cristiano; Giulia; Jeremias; Luca; Raffaello	Aida; Cristiano; Daniele; Giulia	Cecilia; Cristiano; Ignazio; Ivana	Aida; Daniele; Ignazio	Cristiano; Ignazio	Lorenzo; Luca	Cristiano; Ivana	Luca; Raffaello	Aída; Daniele	Daniele; Giulia	Daniele; Ivana; Luca		
Ejected	none		Marco	none	Gianluca	none															
Evicted	Carla; 46.23% to evict	Serena; 50.8% to evict	Carmen D. 68.4% to evict	Simona; 63.9% to evict	Lorenzo; 52.5% to evict	Veronica; 50.5% to evict	Carmen R. 66.2% to evict	Corinne; 41% to evict	Jeremias; 30.3% to evict	Giulia; 44.7% to be finalist	Cecilia; 48.6% to evict	Daniele; 56.7% to be finalist	Ignazio; 56.7% to evict	Lorenzo; 88.1% to evict	Cristiano; 23.8% to be finalist	Raffaello; 37.3% to be finalist	Aída; 62.1% to evict	Giulia; 53.5% to evict	Ivana; 15.4% (out of 3)	Luca; 47.6% (out of 2)	
Evicted	Carla; 46.23% to evict	Serena; 50.8% to evict	Carmen D. 68.4% to evict	Simona; 63.9% to evict	Lorenzo; 52.5% to evict	Veronica; 50.5% to evict	Carmen R. 66.2% to evict	Jeremias; 66.97% to save	Jeremias; 30.3% to evict	Giulia; 44.7% to be finalist	Cecilia; 48.6% to evict	Aida; 24.5% to be finalist	Ignazio; 56.7% to evict	Lorenzo; 88.1% to evict	Cristiano; 23.8% to be finalist	Raffaello; 37.3% to be finalist	Aída; 62.1% to evict	Giulia; 53.5% to evict	Ivana; 15.4% (out of 3)	Luca; 47.6% (out of 2)	
Survived	Luca; 36.53% Ivana; 9.62% Gianluca; 3.93% Ignazio; 3.69%	Lorenzo; 49.2%	Daniele; 31.6%	Lorenzo; 36.1%	Aida; 47.5%	Jeremias; 49.5%	Aida; 33.8%	Aida; 30% Raffaello; 29%	Cristiano; 29.2% Giulia; 26.9% Luca; 6.9% Raffaello; 6.7%	Daniele; 33.1% Cristiano; 14.4% Aida; 7.8%	Ignazio; 23.2% Cristiano; 23.1% Ivana; 5.2%	Ignazio; 18.9%	Cristiano; 43.3%	Luca; 11.9%	Ivana; 76.2% to be finalist	Luca; 62.7% to be finalist	Daniele; 37.9%	Daniele; 46.5%	Daniele; 52.4% to win		
Survived	Luca; 36.53% Ivana; 9.62% Gianluca; 3.93% Ignazio; 3.69%	Lorenzo; 49.2%	Daniele; 31.6%	Lorenzo; 36.1%	Aida; 47.5%	Jeremias; 49.5%	Aida; 33.8%	Jeremias; 33.03% to evict	Cristiano; 29.2% Giulia; 26.9% Luca; 6.9% Raffaello; 6.7%	Daniele; 33.1% Cristiano; 14.4% Aida; 7.8%	Ignazio; 23.2% Cristiano; 23.1% Ivana; 5.2%	Ignazio; 18.9%	Cristiano; 43.3%	Luca; 11.9%	Ivana; 76.2% to be finalist	Luca; 62.7% to be finalist	Daniele; 37.9%	Daniele; 46.5%	Daniele; 52.4% to win		

=== Note ===
- ^Note 1 : Housemates are divided into two teams. They are only able to nominate one housemate from their team.
- ^Note 2 : Aida won the week's challenge. Her vote worths double.
- ^Note 3 : In Week 2 the red team could only nominate males and Cecilia & Jeremias; the blue team could only nominate females. Housemate with most nominations from each team facing public vote.
- ^Note 4 : In Week 3 the red team could only nominate females; the blue team could only nominate males. Housemate with most nominations from each team facing public vote.
- ^Note 5 : Marco won the week's challenge. He can't vote but he can use immunity for the following week (to save himself or another player).
- ^Note 6 : Marco was ejected due to his blasphemous behaviour.
- ^Note 7 : Cecilia & Jeremias (who entered in the house as a single contestant because they are the respectively the sister and the brother of Belen Rodriguez) were divided since Week 4.
- ^Note 8 : Ignazio won the week's challenge. He can't vote but he can use immunity (to save himself or another player).
- ^Note 9 : Gianluca was ejected due to his blasphemous behaviour.
- ^Note 10 : Lorenzo re-entered in the house because he had the jolly card.

== TV Ratings ==
Episode	Date	Viewers	Share
1	September 11, 2017	4,490,000	24.53%
2	September 18, 2017	4,304,000	23.80%
3	September 25, 2017	4,124,000	22.20%
4	October 2, 2017	4,768,000	24.77%
5	October 9, 2017	4,692,000	25.22%
6	October 16, 2017	4,531,000	23.83%
7	October 23, 2017	4,386,000	22.92%
8	October 30, 2017	4,762,000	25.20%
9	November 6, 2017	5,494,000	27.90%
10	November 13, 2017	5,211,000	24.41%
11	November 20, 2017	5,508,000	29.10%
Semifinal	November 27, 2017	5,375,000	28.70%
Final	December 5, 2017	5,569,000	30.92%
Average		4,865,000	25.65%
