= Daniele Persegani =

Italian cook and television personality (born 1972)

Daniele Persegani (born 29 October 1972 in Cremona) is an Italian cook and television personality, who became known as the cook of the television programs Casa Alice on Alice (Italy) and Alice Kochen on Alice Kochen (Germany). Since 2020, he has been appearing on the program È sempre mezzogiorno, presented by Antonella Clerici on Rai 1.

He was also the chef of the Italy national football team in the 2014 FIFA World Cup in Brazil.

== Biography ==
In 1991, Persegani graduated from the hotel management institute in Salsomaggiore Terme. He began working as a student, and once he finished his studies, he became a chef and cooking teacher at the same hotel institute where he graduated from high school. He also serves as a consultant for a multinational manufacturer of catering equipment.

Since 2010, he has participated in several cooking programs on Alice and RAI, also editing a culinary column in the monthly Alice Magazine.

Since 2012, he has been a food consultant and chef at Casa Azzurri, and in 2014 he was the chef of the Italy national football team during the 2014 FIFA World Cup in Brazil.

In April 2024, he suffered Bell's palsy, which was judged not serious and curable.

Persegani lives in Castelvetro Piacentino.
