= Deathline =

- DVD cover
- Directed by: Tibor Takács
- Written by: Tibor Takács; Brian Irving
- Produced by: Brian Irving
- Starring: Rutger Hauer; Mark Dacascos; Yvonne Sciò
- Cinematography: Zoltán David
- Edited by: Neil Grieve
- Music by: Guy Zerafa
- Production company: Millennium Films
- Distributed by: Cinefear
- Release date: 22 December 1997 (Russia)
- Running time: 92 minutes
- Countries: Canada; Netherlands; Hungary
- Language: English

Deathline (also known as Redline) is a 1997 science fiction, action film starring Rutger Hauer and Yvonne Sciò. It was also released under the title Armageddon. A Canadian-Dutch-Hungarian co-production it was filmed mainly in Hungary.

== Reception ==
Video Business characterized the film as "an extended chase-and-shoot piece set in a bizarre retro-Soviet Moscow of the near future", noting that it had a few full-frontal sex scenes. Film critic Randy Myers called it "a diverting and entertaining bit of futuristic phooey" that was "cheap and tawdry" but "so gonzo and entertaining that you can't help but enjoy it".

== Plot ==
Wade, his girlfiend Marina, and Merrick smuggle bio-cyber microchips in from America to a decadent high tech Russia. On his last job, Wade is double-crossed and murdered by Merrick.

Realizing he might have some worth, Wade is resurrected by a secret Russian military organisation. He later escapes from a hospital and, helped by Katya who is a double of Marina, goes after Merrick.

However Merrick used the money he stole to buy himself powerful new friends. It also turns out that Merrick is just a pawn in a bigger game with a group that plans on taking Russia over.

== Cast ==
- Rutger Hauer as John Anderson Wade
- Mark Dacascos as Merrick
- Yvonne Scio as Marina K / Katya
- Patrick Dreikauss as Mishka
- Randall William Cook as Special Prosecutor Vanya Dzerzhinsky
- Michael Mehlman as Serge
- Ildiko Szucs as Antonia
- Istvan Kanizsai as Assistant Prosecutor
- John Thompson as Minister of Defence Udo
- Gabor Peter Vincze as Lieutenant Lo
- Scott Athea as Brat
- Atilla Apra as Yamoto
- Jak Osmond as Assassin
- Roger La Page as Beggar
- Ágnes Bánfalvy as Russian President
- Gábor Nagy as Priest
