= Commediasexi =

- Directed by: Alessandro D'Alatri
- Written by: Gennaro Nunziante; Alessandro D'Alatri
- Produced by: 01 Distribution
- Starring: Sergio Rubini; Paolo Bonolis; Margherita Buy; Stefania Rocca; Elena Santarelli; Rocco Papaleo; Michele Placido
- Cinematography: Agostino Castiglioni
- Edited by: Osvaldo Bargero
- Distributed by: 01 Distribution
- Release date: December 15, 2006
- Running time: 102 minutes
- Country: Italy
- Language: Italian

Commediasexi is a 2006 Italian comedy film directed by Alessandro d'Alatri.

Cineuropa reviewed the film.

== Plot ==
Starring Paolo Bonolis, Sergio Rubini and Stefania Rocca, the film mocks the Italian political class and its hypocrisy. The zealot politician Massimo (Paolo Bonolis), proponent of a law about the defense of family, has a secret love affair with Martina, a young emerging actress (Elena Santarelli). To divert any suspicions, he brings his family on holiday to Paris and tasks his driver, Mariano (Sergio Rubini), with looking after his beloved. After photos portraying Mariano and Martina as lovers are published in local gossip magazines, Mariano's wife faints, is hospitalized and leaves him. Massimo comes back to Rome thinking to be out of danger, but Mariona and Martina take revenge on him. The happy ending comes on Christmas's eve when the truth surfaces.

== Cast ==
- Sergio Rubini: Mariano
- Paolo Bonolis: Massimo Bonfili
- Margherita Buy: Dora
- Rocco Papaleo: Tony
- Michele Placido: Salvatore
- Stefania Rocca: Pia
- Elena Santarelli: Martina
- Marco Cocci: Mino
- Paola Tiziana Cruciani: Sister Giulia
- Fabio De Luigi: Nardi
- Massimo Wertmuller: Onorevole Nappi
- Maurizio Micheli: The Stage Actor

== Reception ==
Giancarlo Zappoli, in his review for MYMovies.it, gave the film 3 stars out of 5.
