= Alice Kochen =

- Country: Germany; Italy
- Broadcast area: Germany

Programming
- Language: German
- Picture format: 16:9

Ownership
- Owner: LT Multimedia

History
- Launched: December 16, 2013; 12 years ago

Alice Kochen ('Alice Cooking') was a privately owned German-language TV cooking channel operated by the Italian network LT Multimedia. The concept was based on the Italian-language channel Alice TV. Alice Kochen was broadcast from 16 December 2013 to 25 September 2015 by Astra 19.2° East.

The German version was freely available by satellite throughout Germany, Austria and Switzerland. In addition to a website, there was also an Alice Kochen magazine, which was sold in newsagents.

On 25 September 2015, the German service ceased broadcasting on Astra. The German-language magazine had ceased publication; the website redirected to the Italian one.

== See also ==
- Daniele Persegani
- Alice TV
