= Case Design Stili =

- Country: Italy

Programming
- Picture format: 576i (SDTV)

Ownership
- Owner: LT Multimedia (2000-2015), Alma Media (2017-2019)

History
- Launched: October 2000
- Former names: Leonardo (2000–2015)

Links
- Website: http://almamediaitalia.it/televisione/

Availability

Terrestrial
- Digital: LCN 223

Case Design Stili, (formerly called Leonardo until 2015), is an Italian television channel owned by Alma Media reopened since 6 February 2017 (channel 223). The channel broadcasts programmes related to fashion and the arts.

On 1 January 2014 Leonardo left the Sky Italia platform and transmits on Tivùsat and digital terrestrial instead of Nuvolari, which is removed, then reopened and moved on channels 224 and 62.

On 13 March 2015 Leonardo, Nuvolari, Marcopolo and Alice leaving the platform Tivùsat and remains visible only on digital terrestrial. From 15 June 2015 Leonardo is visible only on channel 222.

On 25 August 2015 Alma Media declares the closure since 31 August 2015, stating that the contents will be moved in October to Alice channel even with new productions and the historic library will be made available on Smart Italy and since 6 February 2017 the channel returns renamed Case Design Stili.

== Sister channels ==
- Alice – cooking channel
- Marcopolo – travel channel
- Nuvolari – motors and sport channel
