= Stasera a casa di Alice =

- Directed by: Carlo Verdone
- Written by: Leonardo Benvenuti; Piero De Bernardi; Filippo Ascione; Carlo Verdone
- Produced by: Tonino Cervi; Mario Cecchi Gori; Vittorio Cecchi Gori
- Starring: Carlo Verdone; Ornella Muti; Sergio Castellitto
- Cinematography: Danilo Desideri
- Edited by: Antonio Siciliano
- Music by: Vasco Rossi
- Release date: 1990
- Running time: 125 min
- Country: Italy
- Language: Italian

Stasera a casa di Alice (Italian: Tonight at Alice's) is a 1990 Italian comedy film directed by Carlo Verdone.

== Plot ==
Saverio and Filippo are two friends who manage together the religious travel agency owned by their wives in Rome. However, Filippo's wife has discovered that he has been having an affair with Alice, a beautiful and outgoing girl. Filippo is kicked out of the household, but Saverio manages to convince his friend to abandon Alice and return home and his to duties as a family man. However, upon meeting Alice Saverio too falls deeply in love with the girl, and for a while continues to see her behind both his family and Filippo's back, and ignoring his freshly adopted grown up child who had just arrived to Rome from a war zone.

Filippo as well misses Alice terribly. Eventually he finds out about the double betrayal of Saverio. After a public quarrel, the two men agree to take turns in courting and trying to bed her, but that plan also fails when Alice finds out and even offers a threesome, which the two men are unable to consume. To get rid of the rival, Filippo denounces Saverio to his wife, who throws him out. But then Filippo denounces himself as well, not to leave his ex friend able to pursue the affair with Alice undisturbed. Meanwhile they are fired from their job, while Alice keeps struggling to support her catatonic sister and to find a serious job as an actress.

When her sister commits suicide, Alice decides to leave everything behind. She vanishes from Saverio's and Filippo's life, leaving just a recorded message in which she claims to have been offered at last a big role abroad, as a soap-opera actress. The movie ends with the duo deciding to try once more a return to their family and normal life, although preserving Alice's home as she left it, just in case she will return.

== Cast ==
- Carlo Verdone as Saverio
- Ornella Muti as Alice
- Sergio Castellitto as Filippo
- Yvonne Sciò as Valentina
- Cinzia Leone as Gigliola
- Paolo Paoloni as Monsignore
- Francesca D'Aloja as Chicca
