= Avanti un altro! =

Italian game show

- Genre: Game show
- Created by: Paolo Bonolis; Stefano Santucci
- Directed by: Stefano Vicario; (2011–2024): Francesca Leprini; (2025–)
- Presented by: Paolo Bonolis (2011–); Luca Laurenti (2011–); Gerry Scotti (2014–15)
- Country of origin: Italy
- Original language: Italian
- No. of seasons: 15
- No. of episodes: 1785

Production
- Executive producer: Antonella Carbone
- Production location: Rome
- Cinematography: Massimo Pascucci
- Running time: 50 minutes approx including commercials
- Production companies: RTI and Endemol Shine Group

Original release
- Network: Canale 5
- Release: 5 September 2011 – present

Avanti un altro! is an Italian game show hosted by Paolo Bonolis and Luca Laurenti. It premiered on 5 September 2011, hosted by Paolo Bonolis and Luca Laurenti. The international distribution name for the show is "Next One!" and it is owned and distributed by Endemol Shine Group.

== First phase ==
Avanti un altro! is a daily game show where players queue up on stage one by one to take part in a high-speed game of knowledge. The host begins the game by calling up the first contestant in line. In most rounds, the host asks the contestant four questions in a given category, each of which has two options for the correct answer. The contestant must answer three of the four questions correctly. If the contestant answers two questions incorrectly, they are eliminated from the game and the host calls the next contestant forward.

If the contestant answers three questions correctly, however, he or she is allowed to select a scroll ("pidigozzo") from a rotating table ("pidigozzaro"). Most of the scrolls contain cash amounts ranging from €1,000 to €200,000, which are added to the contestant's score. There are also several special scrolls in the game:

- La pariglia ("The duel"): If there is another person in the champion's chair (see below), the contestant's score is raised to match that of the current champion, and the contestant and the current champion face off on one question, on the buzzers. A correct answer wins the duel and gets or keeps that player the champion's chair, while an incorrect answer loses the duel and eliminates that player automatically. In addition, if neither player buzzes in within 10 seconds after the question is asked, the current champion wins the duel automatically. (If a contestant selects La Pariglia with nobody in the champion's chair, the contestant's score is reset to zero.) If there is a champion the duel is mandatory, unless the contestant is able to reject it due to a special question (see below).
- Lo iettatore ("The jinx"): The contestant's score is reset to zero, and the contestant is asked a question by an actor dressed similarly to an undertaker. The question usually relates to death or misfortune of some sort (for instance, a question about music might relate to a deceased artist in some way). If the contestant fails to answer the question correctly, he or she is eliminated.
- Avanti un altro! ("Next one!"): The contestant is eliminated from the game immediately.
- Il fato benevolo ("The good fairy"), later renamed La bona sorte ("Good luck"): Added in the 2014 season. The contestant is asked a single question by a male actor dressed as a fairy or a female actress dressed as an angel. From the 2017 season the scroll is renamed La bona sorte and the question is asked by the same fairy. If the contestant answers correctly, his or her score is immediately increased to €300,000 and he automatically becomes champion; if answered incorrectly, the game simply continues normally.

Some rounds feature special questions, usually presented by or featuring a costumed performer (Until 2015 the performers were part of "Minimondo" Little World while from 2017 it's called "Salottino" Sitting Room and the contestant can choose the question and performer). In general, these rounds consist of a single question, which may be open-ended or multiple choice. If the question is answered incorrectly, the contestant is eliminated. A contestant who succeeds on a special question (including a Lo iettatore question) may choose to reject his or her first scroll and choose another and accept that result, except that a selection of Lo iettatore or Avanti un altro cannot be rejected in this way. In addition, this is the only way a contestant may decline to participate in La pariglia (assuming it is chosen first; if it is chosen following a rejection of another scroll, the contestant must face the duel).

One or two rounds during the show are designated as "bonus" rounds. A bonus round is indicated by a model of the contestant's preferred gender (dubbed Mr./Ms. Bonus) going on stage and standing with the contestant while the contestant plays a normal round (usually, the model also massages the contestant while the round is in progress). If the contestant succeeds in that round and selects a money amount on the resulting scroll selection, the amount is doubled.

After any successful round, the contestant may choose to close his or her game and take a seat in the champion's chair. All subsequent contestants on that show must beat the current champion's score (ties go in favour of the current champion except if both contestants have 300.000 the contestant becomes champion) in order to be able to close their respective games and take over the champion's chair. A displaced champion is eliminated from the game.

Multiple rounds are played according to available time; an alarm sounds when the final round is about to begin. At that point, the contestant must successfully complete the round and attain a higher score than the champion on the resulting scroll selection (or selections, if the final round is a special question) in order to win the game. If the contestant fails to complete the round, or fails to overtake the champion, the champion wins. The winner plays the final for his or her total score, plus €100,000.

== Final game ==
In the final stage, the last person sitting in the chair plays to win his entire jackpot plus €100,000. The contestant has 150 seconds to answer 21 questions incorrectly. Each question has two choices, and the contestant must select the incorrect option. Choosing the incorrect answer allows the contestant to move on to the next question; if the contestant chooses the correct answer, he or she must start over from the beginning of the list. In addition, the contestant must answer each question within two seconds (they may interrupt the question); failure to answer within that time also forces the contestant to start over. (Starting in 2015, the contestant does not have to answer within any specific time limit.) If the contestant can successfully answer all 21 questions incorrectly within 150 seconds, he or she wins all the money built up during the game, plus an additional €100,000.

If time runs out, the score money from the game is out of play, and the contestant continues to play for a jackpot that starts at €100,000 and decreases by €1,000 for each second beyond the initial time limit. Once the jackpot reaches €50,000 (reduced to €30,000 from 2015 to 2023), a light beam (the "freeze ray") is activated, and the contestant may place his or her hand into the beam, thus "freezing" the jackpot and stopping it from counting down further. Once the jackpot is frozen, the contestant is given one last chance to answer all the questions from the beginning. If the contestant makes a mistake at any point during his or her final run (whether by choosing the correct answer at any point, or taking too long to respond - two seconds prior to 2015, or 10 seconds from 2015 on) the jackpot is lost and their game is over. The game also ends in failure if a further 100 seconds elapse beyond the initial time limit, allowing the money to count down to €0.

== International versions ==
Country	Title	Network	Host	Date aired
Albania	Tjetri!	Top Channel	Eduart Manushi	15 October 2012 – 6 March 2015
Brazil	Tem gente atrás (part of Domingão do Faustão)	Rede Globo	Fausto Silva	22 September 2013 – 8 June 2014
Bulgaria	Следващият, моля Sledvashtijat, molja	TV7	Bashar Rahal	5 October 2013 – 30 June 2014
Canada	Au suivant!	Ici Radio-Canada Télé	Stéphane Bellavance	16 September 2016 – 29 November 2024
Chile	Avanti ¡que pase el siguiente!	La Red	Leo Caprile	22 September 2014 – 24 March 2015
Hungary	A következő!	M1	Gábor Gundel Takács	2 September 2013 – 31 May 2014
Italy (original version)	Avanti un altro!	Canale 5	Paolo Bonolis and Luca Laurenti; Gerry Scotti (2014–2015)	5 September 2011 – present
Paraguay	Avanti ¡que pase el siguiente!	Telefuturo	Palo Rubín	15 April 2015 – 27 December 2015
Poland	Następny proszę!	TV Puls	Marcin Wójcik	30 September 2018 – 2 December 2018
Romania	Tu urmezi!	Kanal D	Dan Negru	3 September 2022 – 25 August 2024
Spain	Avanti ¡que pase el siguiente!	Antena 3	Carlos Sobera	27 April 2012 – 3 August 2012
Turkey	Sıradaki Gelsin	Fox	Emre Karayel	5 January 2017 – 4 May 2017
Vietnam	Người kế tiếp	VTV6, HTV7	Thanh Bạch; Đại Nghĩa	19 September 2013 – 25 May 2015
