= Romina Mondello =

Italian actress and television personality

- Born: 1 March 1974 (age 52); Rome, Italy
- Occupation: Actress
- Children: 1

Romina Mondello (born 1 March 1974) is an Italian actress and television personality.

== Life and career ==
Born in Rome, Italy, at young age Mondello attended a theater workshop under the stage director Candido Coppetelli and studied singing and classical and modern dance. After entering the Miss Italia selections in 1992, the same year she was cast in the variety shows Bulli e pupe and Non è la RAI. She made her acting debut in 1993, in the film Estasi, alongside Ornella Muti. The notoriety came in 1995 with the TV series La piovra in season 7, which was immediately followed by the successful action film Palermo – Milan One Way by Claudio Fragasso. Active in films, television and on stage, Mondello is married to a publisher of art books and has a son, Lupo.
