= Yvonne Sciò =

Italian model and actress (born 1969)

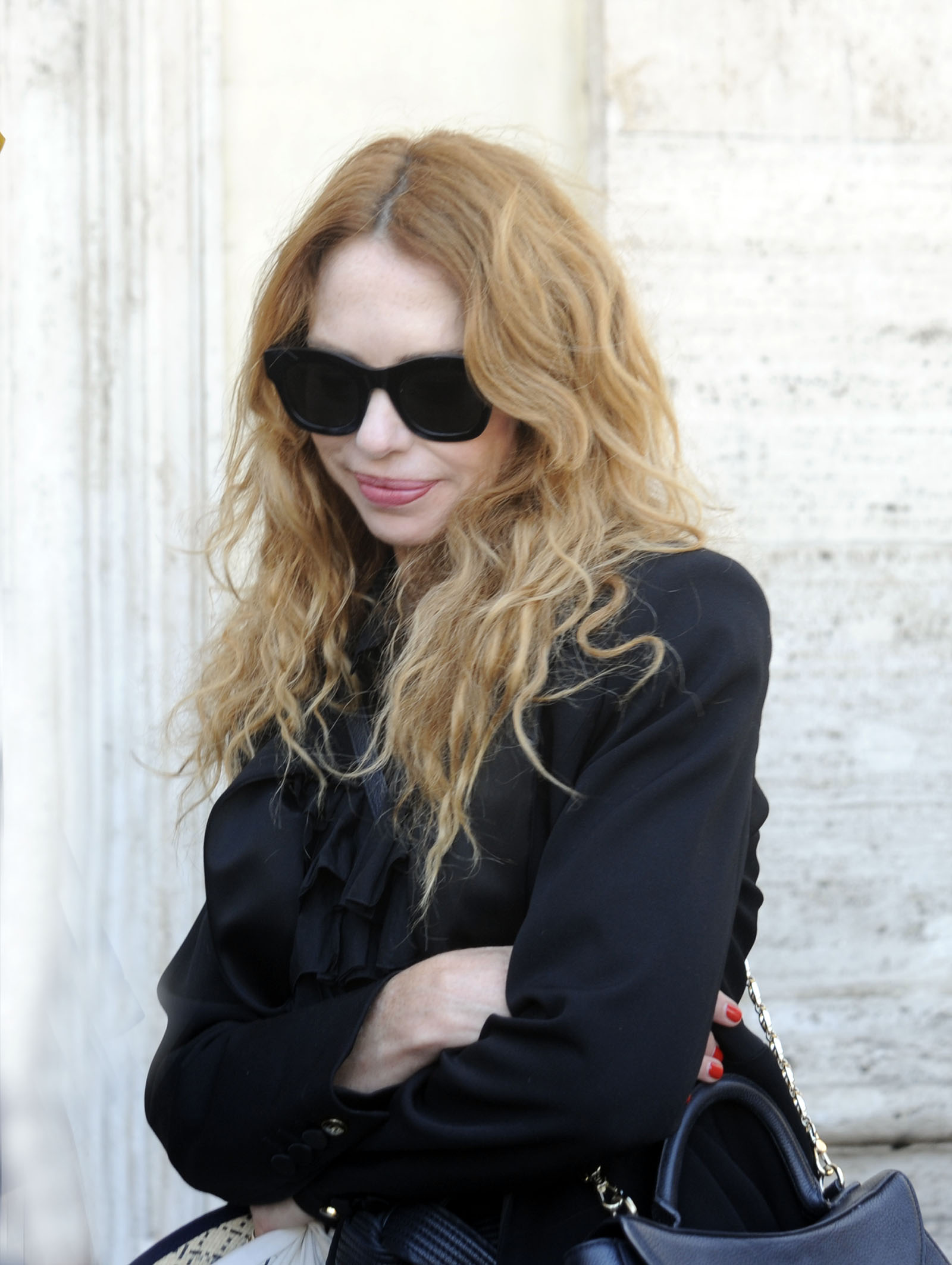
Yvonne Sciò in Rome (2024)

Yvonne Brulatour Sciò (born 25 July 1969) is an Italian model and actress.

== Biography ==
Born in Rome, Sciò was educated at St. George's British International School. She started her career as a runway model in the late 1980s. Following her acting debut in the Sergio Martino's TV-series Rally in 1988, she became first known for a series of Sip commercials broadcast between 1989 and the early 1990s.

In 1990 she had her first significant film role in Carlo Verdone's Stasera a casa di Alice, then, in 1991 she was hosted a segment in the successful variety show Non è la Rai. After several TV and film appearances, in the mid-1990s Sciò moved in the US, where she worked mainly on television, appearing in the TV-series La Femme Nikita, in the miniseries Rose Red, and playing investigator Elyssa Collins in the soap opera One Life to Live. She also appeared in the music video for Tal Bachman's song "She's So High" in 1999.

In 2005 she claimed to have been physically attacked by Naomi Campbell.

Sciò married the film producer Stefano Dammicco on November 12, 2005.

== Filmography ==
Year	Title	Role	Notes
1988	Dinner with a Vampire		
1990	Stasera a casa di Alice	Valentina	
1991	Strepitosamente... flop	Sara	
1992	Zuppa di pesce		
1992	Sabato italiano	Violante	episode No. 3
1992	Infelici e contenti	Sara	
1994	Jacob	Judith	television movie
1997–98	The Nanny	Geneviève / Arianna Levine	2 episodes
1997–98	La Femme Nikita	Lisa Fanning	2 episodes
1997	Deathline	Marina K. / Katya	
1997	Boy Meets World	Versailles	
1998	Welcome to Hollywood	Girlfriend at Audition	
1998	L'âme soeur	Valentina	
1999	Milonga	Marlene	
1999	Passport to Paris	Brigitte	
1999	She's So High	Girl	music video
2000	Primetime Murder	Claudia	
2001	La Vérité si je mens ! 2	Annabella	
2001	Layover	Vickie Dennis	
2002	Stephen King's Rose Red	Deanna Petrie	television miniseries
2002	Sorority Boys	Frederique	
2005	Torrente 3: El protector	Giannina	
2006	The Pink Panther	Casino Waitress	
2006	The Nativity Story	Thief's Accomplice	
2007	The Lark Farm	Livia	
2007	Scrivilo sui muri	Caterina	
2007	The Hideout	Ella Murray	
2008	Brothel	Katie	
2008	K. Il bandito	Bianca	
2010	The Museum of Wonders	Yvonne	
2013	H.P. Lovecraft: Two Left Arms	Emma Galliani	
