= Scherzi a parte =

Television program

- Genre: Hidden camera; Practical joke
- Country of origin: Italy
- Original language: Italian
- No. of seasons: 15
- No. of episodes: 144

Original release
- Network: Italia 1 Canale 5
- Release: 9 February 1992 – present

Scherzi a parte is a hidden camera-practical joke television series aired in prime time from 9 February 1992, first on Italia 1 and then on Canale 5.

The show is characterized by having national and international celebrities as victims. Over the years the show was criticized as some of the pranks appeared to be arranged with the victims. Several practical jokes, including Adriano Celentano's, Giancarlo Giannini's, Claudio Cecchetto's and Alessandro Benvenuti's, were never broadcast because the victims did not sign any agreement for the airing.

== Editions ==
#	Year	Presenters
1	1992	Teo Teocoli, Gene Gnocchi and Angela Melillo
2	1993	Teo Teocoli, Gene Gnocchi and Angela Melillo
3	1994	Teo Teocoli, Massimo Boldi and Pamela Prati
4	1995	Teo Teocoli, Massimo Lopez and Simona Ventura
5	1997	Massimo Lopez, Lello Arena and Elenoire Casalegno
6	1999	Simona Ventura and Marco Columbro
7	2002	Teo Teocoli, Massimo Boldi and Michelle Hunziker
8	2003	Teo Teocoli, Anna Maria Barbera and Manuela Arcuri
9	2005	Diego Abatantuono, Massimo Boldi and Alessia Marcuzzi
10	2007	Claudio Amendola, Valeria Marini, Cristina Chiabotto and Katia & Valeria
11	2009	Claudio Amendola, Teo Mammucari and Belén Rodríguez
12	2012	Luca e Paolo
13	2015	Paolo Bonolis
14	2018	Paolo Bonolis
15	2021	Enrico Papi
16	2022	Enrico Papi
17	2026	Max Giusti

== Victims ==
- Giorgio Faletti
- Enrica Bonaccorti
- Enrico Brignano
- Iva Zanicchi
- Claudio Amendola
- Daniele Formica
- Cristina D'Avena
- Evaristo Beccalossi
- Claudia Mori
- Vittorio Sgarbi
- Lamberto Sposini
- Alessandro Gassmann
- Diego Abatantuono
- Enrico Mentana
- Leo Gullotta
- Anita Ekberg
- Brigitte Nielsen
- Moana Pozzi
- Faye Dunaway
- Gigi Sabani
- Valeria Marini
- Katia Ricciarelli
- Lina Wertmuller
- Fiorella Pierobon
- Roberto Vecchioni
- Ottaviano Del Turco
- Sergio Vastano
- Maurizio Fondriest
- Raimondo Vianello
- Sandra Mondaini
- Carol Alt
- George Weah
- Anna Falchi
- Santi Licheri
- Maria Grazia Cucinotta
- Alain Delon
- Emilio Fede
- Gene Gnocchi
- Alessandro Cecchi Paone
- Carlo Verdone
- Mara Venier
- Bud Spencer
- Fabrizio Ravanelli
- Elenoire Casalegno
- Raz Degan
- Wendy Windham
- Raoul Bova
- Gianluigi Buffon
- Marco Liorni
- Eddie Irvine
- Claudio Bisio
- Jean-Claude Van Damme
- Fabio Cannavaro
- Ellen Hidding
- Natasha Stefanenko
- Didi Leoni
- Barbara De Rossi
- Antonella Clerici
- Pippo Franco
- Laura Pausini
- Elena Sofia Ricci
- Walter Zenga
- Nancy Brilli
- Fiona May
- Luca Laurenti
- Nathalie Caldonazzo
- Kristian Ghedina
- Gabriel Garko
- Paola Barale
- Demo Morelli
- Ivana Trump
- Al Bano
- Max Biaggi
- Cesare Cremonini
- Flavio Briatore
- Manuela Arcuri
- Nina Moric
- Giovanni Rana
- Alba Parietti
- Massimo Boldi
- Carlton Myers
- Irene Grandi
- Flavia Vento
- Pino Insegno
- Natalia Estrada
- Vincenzo Salemme
- Tosca D'Aquino
- Mohammed Kallon
- Simona Ventura
- Daniele Bossari
- Amanda Lear
- Arrigo Sacchi
- Eva Grimaldi
- Francesca Rettondini
- Miriana Trevisan
- Afef
- Alberto Castagna
- Jury Chechi
- Pietro Taricone
- Stefania Orlando
- Maddalena Corvaglia
- Gigi D'Alessio
- Alessandro Preziosi
- Isolde Kostner
- Gennaro Gattuso
- Cristina Parodi
- Laura Freddi
- Serse Cosmi
- Samantha de Grenet
- Randi Ingerman
- Gary Dourdan
- Martina Stella
- Maria De Filippi
- Luca Barbareschi
- Anna Valle
- Adriana Volpe
- Rocco Siffredi
- Giuliana De Sio
- Joaquin Cortes
- Paolo Brosio
- Dario Vergassola
- Federica Panicucci
- Marcus Schenkenberg
- Stefano Bettarini
- Elisabetta Canalis
- Megan Gale
- Kevin Costner
- Rossella Brescia
- Dustin Hoffman
- Selen
- Jane Alexander
- Daniel Ducruet
- Emanuela Folliero
- Katherine Kelly Lang
- Walter Nudo
- Ilary Blasi
- Federica Fontana
- Aida Yespica
- Alessia Marcuzzi
- Alena Seredova
- Anna Tatangelo
- Monica Vanali
- Roberta Capua
- Ainett Stephens
- Alessandra Mussolini
- Victoria Silvstedt
- Sabrina Ferilli
- Vladimir Luxuria
- Ilaria D'Amico
- Vanessa Incontrada
- Asia Argento
- Mickey Rourke
- Gerard Depardieu
- Clemente Russo
- Andrew Howe
- Barbara D'Urso
- Gioele Dix
- Dejan Stankovic
- Kaspar Capparoni
- Laura Torrisi
- Ezequiel Lavezzi
- Edwige Fenech
- Rupert Everett
- Serena Autieri
- Sergio Assisi
- Juliana Moreira
- Fabrizio Corona
- Ronn Moss
- Lory Del Santo
- Antonio Razzi
- Francesca Cipriani
- Mario Giordano
- Dayane Mello
- Giulia Salemi
- Paola Di Benedetto
- Antonio Zequila
- Elettra Lamborghini
- Nicola Porro
- Veronica Gentili
- Diletta Leotta
- Rocco Siffredi
- Massimo Giletti
- Giorgio Mastrota
- Nicolas Vaporidis
- Enzo Miccio
- Ricky Tognazzi
- Simona Izzo
- Elisabetta Gregoraci
- Drusilla Gucci
- Simona Branchetti
- Deborah Compagnoni
- Giucas Casella
- Marcell Jacobs
- Sabrina Salerno
