= Paolo Bonolis =

Italian television host

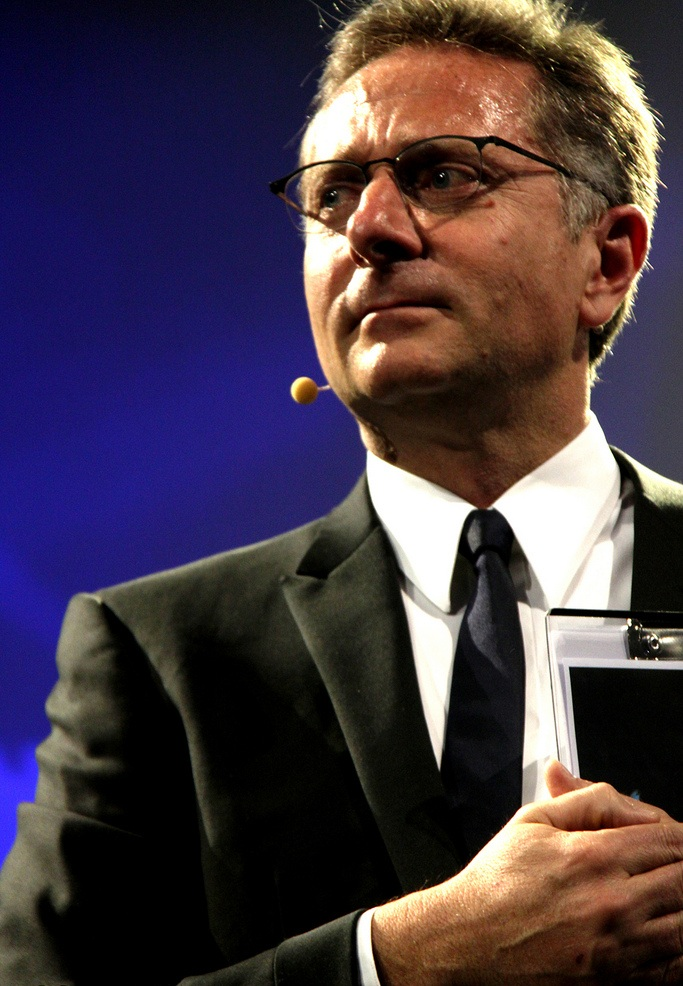
- Bonolis in 2010
- Born: 14 June 1961 (age 65); Rome, Italy
- Occupations: Television presenter; television writer; producer
- Years active: 1980–present
- Height: 1.79 m (5 ft 10 in)
- Spouses: Diane Zoeller (m. 1983; div. 1988) Sonia Bruganelli (m. 2002; sep. 2023)
- Children: Stefano Bonolis; Martina Bonolis; Silvia Bonolis; Davide Bonolis; Adele Bonolis

Paolo Bonolis (Italian: [ˈpaːolo boˈnɔːlis]; born 14 June 1961) is an Italian television presenter, television writer and producer. He made his debut in 1981 on 3, 2, 1... contatto!, a programme for children that aired on Italian national broadcaster Rai.

== Biography ==
In 1982, he moved to Italia 1 where he hosted Bim bum bam, still a programme for children. He anchored Bim Bum Bam until 1990 and then he hosted some variety shows such as Urka!, Bulli & pupe, Non è la Rai and Belli freschi. After that, he signed back with Rai and hosted a few prime-time shows such as I cervelloni, Beato tra le donne and the quiz show Luna park, on air in the evening in Rai.

In 1996 he went back to Mediaset, where he successfully hosted Tira & molla and the prime time shows Ciao Darwin and Chi ha incastrato Peter Pan?. Beginning in the same year he also hosted on Canale 5 the satirical news programme Striscia la notizia. The programme was anchored along with Bonolis's longstanding collaborator, the singer and comic actor Luca Laurenti.

He returned to Rai in 2003, when he presented Domenica in and, later, Affari tuoi, the Italian version of Deal or No Deal, one of Rai's most fondly-remembered game shows. After that, he presented the Sanremo Music Festival 2005, the most important Italian music festival, with great success. He repeated this experience in 2009 with Ivan Olita.

In the second part of the 2000s (decade), he hosted, for Canale 5, programmes such as Il senso della vita and some new editions of the successful shows Ciao Darwin and Chi ha incastrato Peter Pan?.

In 2006, he debuted in the movie industry with the film Commediasexi.

As of 2023, Paolo Bonolis' net worth is estimated to be around $30 million. Most of his wealth comes from his work in television and other entertainment businesses.

== World records ==
Paolo Bonolis has pronounced 335 words in one minute. The words are a part of the first chapter of The Betrothed (Italian: I Promessi Sposi).

== Advertising ==
From 2000 to 2011, together with Luca Laurenti, he took part in 30 adverts for Lavazza coffee, replacing Tullio Solenghi in the advertising campaign "Paradise", created in 1995.

== Personal life ==
Bonolis, who has Romanian roots, is a devoted fan of Inter Milan. In an interview with the TV Show 'Oggi', his daughter Anna Carollo claimed that Bonolis turned into a 'kid' whenever Inter played, due to his strong passion. Bonolis took part in Inter's official party celebrating the club's fifteenth scudetto and as the speaker for the Inter-Siena match on 17 May 2009, a game in which the Nerazzurri lifted their seventeenth Serie A trophy (Italian: scudetto).

== Filmography ==
=== Film ===
Year	Title	Role(s)	Notes
1996	Classe mista 3ª A	Tony Costa	
1999	Stuart Little	Snowbell	Italian voice-over role
2006	Commediasexi	Massimo Bonfili	
2007	Earth	Narrator	Italian version
2021	Tom & Jerry	Real Estate Rat	Italian voice-over role
2025	Smurfs	Papa Smurf	Italian voice-over role

=== Television ===
Year	Title	Role(s)	Notes
1980–1981	3, 2, 1… contatto!	Himself (host)	Variety show (season 2)
1982–1990	Bim Bum Bam	Himself (host)	Children's and teens variety show (season 1–9)
1985	I cartonissimi	Himself (host)	Children's comedy show (season 1)
1989–1990	Sabato al circo	Himself (performer)	Variety show (season 1)
1990	Speciale Bim Bum Bam	Himself (host)	Special
1990	Doppio slalom	Himself (host)	Game show (season 6)
1991	Urka!	Himself (host)	Game show
1991	Sei un fenomeno	Himself (host)	Variety show
1991	Evviva l'allegria	Himself (host)	Variety show (season 2)
1992	Bulli e pupe	Himself (host)	Variety show
1992–1993	Non è la Rai	Himself (host)	Variety show (season 2)
1992–1994	Occhio allo specchio!	Himself (host)	Sketch comedy show
1993	Belli freschi	Himself (host)	Variety show
1994	Sabato notte Live	Himself (host)	Italian version of Saturday Night Live
1994–1996	I cervelloni	Himself (host)	Variety show (season 1–3)
1994–1996	Miss Italia nel Mondo	Himself (host)	Annual beauty contest
1994–1997	Beato tra le donne	Himself (host)	Variety show (season 1–4)
1995–1996	Luna Park	Himself (host; only on Fridays)	Game show (season 2)
1995–1996	Fantastica italiana	Himself (host)	Talent show (season 1)
1996	Castrocaro Music Festival 1996	Himself (host)	Annual music festival
1996–1998	Tira & Molla	Himself (host)	Game show (season 1–2)
1997	Il gatto e la volpe	Himself (host)	Variety show
1997	The Simpsons	Lionel Hutz (voice)	Italian voice; episode: "Realty Bites"
1997–1999	Un disco per l'estate	Himself (host)	Annual music festival
1998–present	Ciao Darwin	Himself (host)	Variety competition program; also co-creator
1999–2017	Chi ha incastrato Peter Pan?	Himself (host)	Children's variety show
2000	Miss Italia 2000	Himself (head of jury)	Annual beauty contest
2000	2000's Telegattos	Himself (host)	Awards ceremony
2000	Ricomincio da 20	Himself (co-host)	Special
2000–2003	Striscia la notizia	Himself (host)	Satirical program (season 12–15)
2001	Italiani	Himself (host)	Game show
2003–2004	Domenica in	Himself (host)	Talk show (season 28)
2003–2005	Affari tuoi	Himself (host)	Game show (season 1–2)
2005	Sanremo Music Festival 2005	Himself (host and artistic director)	Annual music festival
2005–2011	Il senso della vita	Himself (host)	Talk show
2006	Fattore C	Himself (host)	Game show
2009	Sanremo Music Festival 2009	Himself (host and artistic director)	Annual music festival
2011–present	Avanti un altro!	Himself (host)	Game show; also co-creator and producer
2013	Jump! Stasera mi tuffo	Himself (judge)	Game show
2015–2018	Scherzi a parte	Himself (host)	Hidden camera prank program (season 13–14)
2015	Expo Milano 2015: The Opening	Himself (host)	Special
2015	Arena di Verona, lo spettacolo sta per iniziare	Himself (host)	Special
2017–2022	Avanti un altro! Pure di sera	Himself (host)	Primetime version of Avanti un altro!
2018	Romolo + Giuly	Himself	Guest star; episode: "C'eravamo tanto odiati"
2025	Tú sí que vales	Himself (judge)	Talent show (season 12)
2026	I Cesaroni	Himself	Episode: "Nel nome del padre del padre di mio padre"
