= Federica Ridolfi =

Federica Ridolfi (born 2 March 1974 in Rome) is an Italian dancer and a hostess on television.

== Biography ==
Federica Ridolfi appeared in various TV shows in Italy. She is a daughter of an actor Gianni Ridolfi and is engaged to a soccer player Giuliano Giannichedda. Federica Ridolfi starred in Quelli che... il calcio, live sport, comedy and music TV show that announces in real time goal of Italian Soccer Championship, with Simona Ventura.
