= Alice (TV channel) =

- Country: Italy
- Broadcast area: Italy

Programming
- Language: Italian
- Picture format: 16:9

Ownership
- Owner: Alma Media

History
- Launched: 1999
- Closed: 1 May 2020
- Replaced by: Alma TV

Links
- Website: http://www.alice.tv

Availability

Terrestrial
- Digital: LCN 221

Alice is a thematic television channel, dedicated to cooking. Broadcasting began in 2000, both on digital terrestrial television and on satellite with the satellite platform Tivù Sat, both on channel 41.

== See also ==
- Daniele Persegani
- Alice Kochen
- Tivù Sat
