= Dejan Stankovic =

Dejan Stanković or Stankovic can refer to:

- Dejan Stanković (born 1957) (born 1957), former footballer and current football manager
- Dejan Vuk Stanković (born 1973), Serbian university professor, political analyst and politician
- Dejan Stanković (born 1978), Serbian professional football manager and former player
- Dejan Stankovic (beach soccer) (born 1985), Swiss beach soccer player
