= Andrei Snitko =

Belarusian male track cyclist

Personal information
- Born: 25 March 1991 (age 35)

Cycling career
- Sport: Cycling
- Discipline: Track cycling
- Role: Rider
- Rider type: team pursuit

Andrei Snitko (born 25 March 1991) is a Belarusian male track cyclist. He competed in the team pursuit event at the 2013 UCI Track Cycling World Championships.
