= Auricchio =

Italian cheesemaker

- Company type: Private
- Industry: Dairy products
- Founded: 1877
- Founder: Gennaro Auricchio
- Headquarters: Cremona, Italy
- Products: Cheese
- Owner: Auricchio family
- Number of employees: 350
- Website: Auricchio.it

Auricchio is an Italian cheese-making company, based in Cremona, Italy.

== History ==
The company was founded in 1877 at San Giuseppe Vesuviano in the province of Naples. Gennaro Auricchio was the creator of a special rennet to produce provolone.

By the 1880s it was exporting cheese to the United States, for stocking in Little Italy's shops. This growth created the need for new facilities, with a dairy added in Cremona before 1900.

Over time, the company acquired other brands and companies to expand its product line beyond its original focus on provolone cheese. As of 2016, they produced approximately 50% of all provolone sold in Italy. The Italian Ministry of Economic Development released a 95-cent stamp in 2017 in honor of the 140th anniversary of the company.

== Modern production ==
Today, Auricchio also has plants in:

- Macomer (Nuoro) for pecorino romano DOP and other fresh and mature sheep cheeses
- Scandiano (Reggio Emilia) for production of caciotta (roundish small soft cheese) and ricotta
- Solignano (Parma) specialized in the production of Parmigiano Reggiano

== Products ==
The company is the largest producer of provolone cheese in Italy, and offers a significant range of dairy products:

- Provolone (sharp, mild and smoked)
- Parmigiano Reggiano
- Grana Padano
- Pecorino romano (protected designation of origin)
- A large assortment of fresh and seasoned pecorino cheeses

== See also ==
- List of companies of Italy
