= Enrica Bonaccorti =

Italian television presenter and actress (1949–2026)

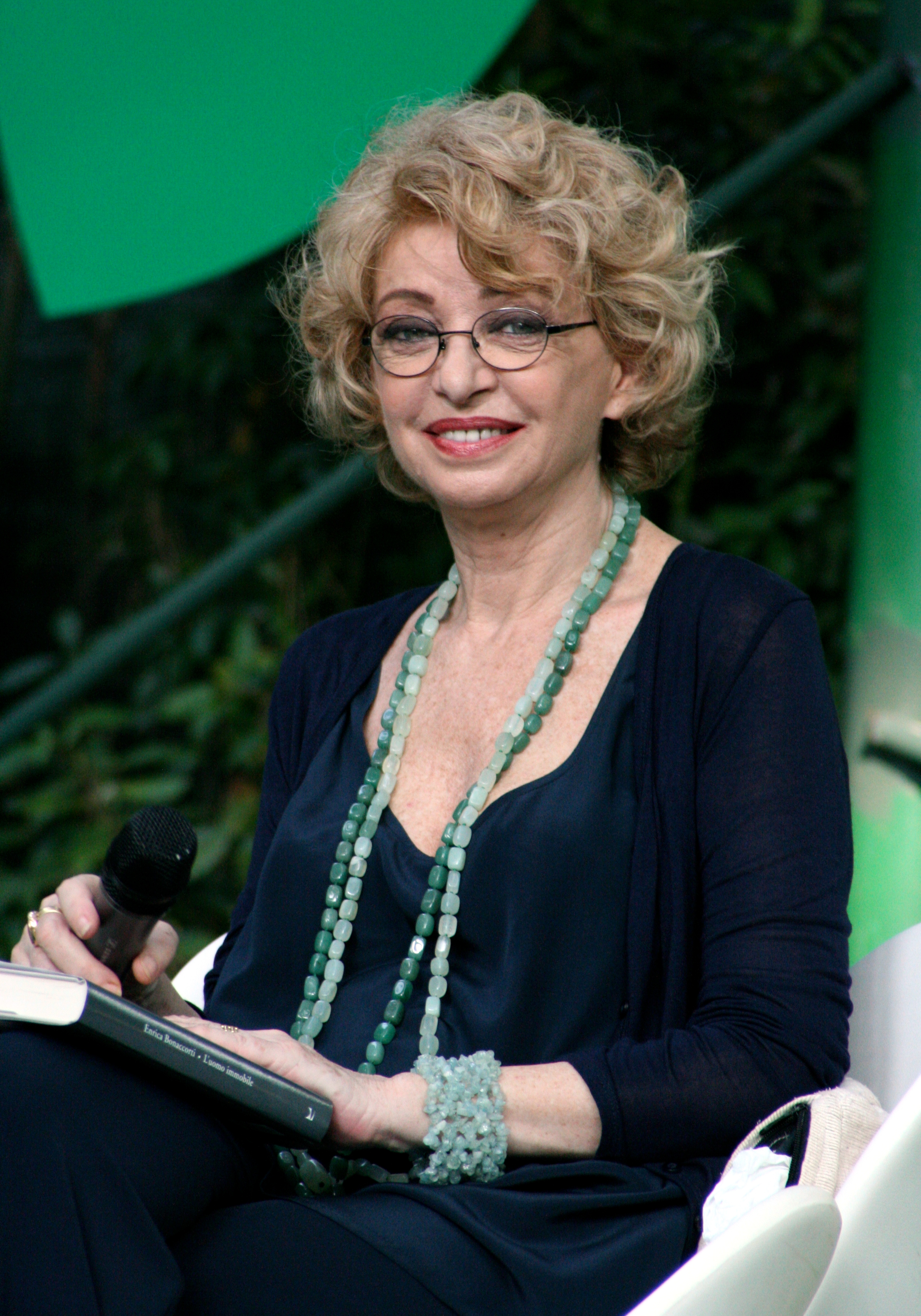
- Bonaccorti in 2010
- Born: 18 November 1949; Savona, Italy
- Died: 12 March 2026 (aged 76); Rome, Italy
- Occupations: Television presenter; actress; lyricist

Enrica Bonaccorti (18 November 1949 – 12 March 2026) was an Italian television presenter, actress and song lyricist.

== Early life ==
Enrica Bonaccorti was born on 18 November 1949 in Savona, Liguria, to Ettore, a police colonel and former partisan, and Tiziana, a Neapolitan teacher. Bonaccorti spent her adolescence in several cities, including Genoa and Sassari, following her father's professional postings.

== Career ==
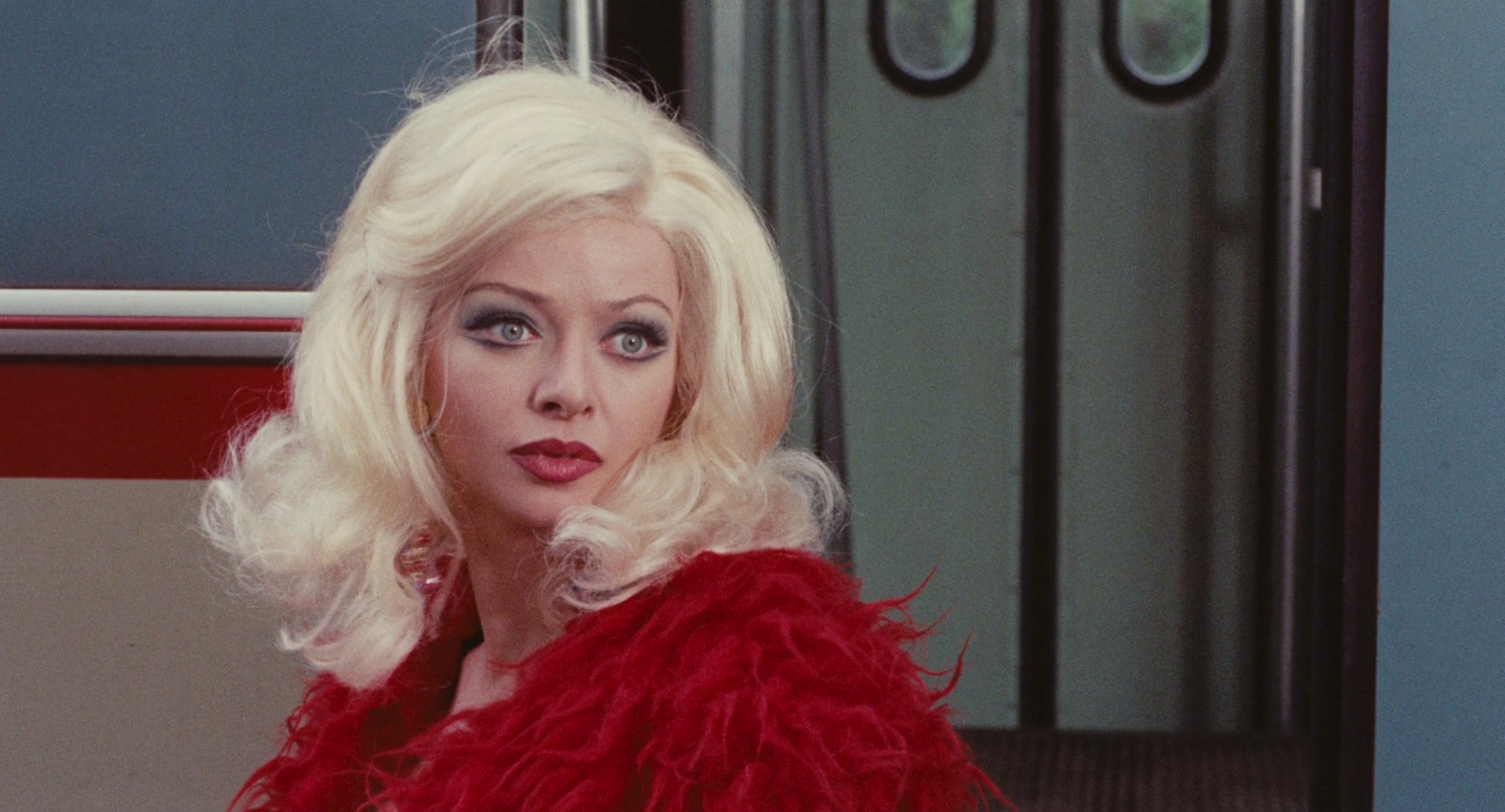
Bonaccorti in Your Vice Is a Locked Room and Only I Have the Key (1972)

Bonaccorti started her career on stage, debuting in the play Alla ringhiera and later joining the stage company held by Domenico Modugno and Paola Quattrini. She also collaborated with Modugno composing the lyrics of several songs, notably Modugno's hits "La lontananza" and "Amara terra mia". During the 1970s she appeared in films and television series.

She debuted as radio presenter in 1974, with the program L'uomo della notte, which she hosted alongside the poet Alfonso Gatto, and as television presenter in 1978 with the quiz show Il sesso forte, which she co-hosted with Michele Gammino. She had the peak of her career between the mid-1980s and the early 1990s, when she hosted the successful quiz shows Pronto, chi gioca? (1985–1987), Cari genitori (1988–1991), and the first season of the variety show Non è la Rai (1991–1992).

== Personal life and death ==
Bonaccorti was an atheist. She died of pancreatic cancer on 12 March 2026, at the age of 76.

== Filmography ==
=== Film ===
Year	Title	Role	Notes
1969	Metti, una sera a cena	Actress playing "Pirandello"	Cameo appearance
1970	Belle d'amore	Prostitute	Cameo appearance
1972	Jus primae noctis	Diciassettesima	
1972	Your Vice Is a Locked Room and Only I Have the Key	Giovanna	
1972	Beati i ricchi	Adele	
1973	The Sensual Man	Mariella	
1973	Il maschio ruspante	Pamela	
1973	Love and Anarchy	Hooker	Cameo appearance
1975	Cagliostro	None	Only writer
1980	The Precarious Bank Teller	Esmeralda	
1980	Prima della lunga notte	Hulde Vernar	
1991	Faccione	Herself	Cameo appearance
2021	With or Without You	Laura	

=== Television ===
Year	Title	Role	Notes
1972	La pietra di Luna	Penelope Betteredge	Main role (5 episodes)
1973	Eleonora	Olga	Television film
1975	L'amaro caso della baronessa di Carini	Cristina	Main role (4 episodes)
1975	Ella si umilia per vincere ovvero gli equivoci di una notte	Constance Neville	Television film
1976	A casa, una sera…	Maggie Howard	Two-parts television film
1978	Il sesso forte	Herself / Host	Game show
1979	Vienna New Year's Concert	Herself / Host	Concert special
1980	Chiamata urbana urgente per il numero...	Herself / Host	Variety show
1983–1985	Italia sera	Herself / Host	Variety show
1985–1987	Pronto, chi gioca?	Herself / Host	Game show
1987–1988	Ciao Enrica	Herself / Host	Talk show
1988–1991	Cari genitori	Herself / Host	Game show (season 1-3)
1991–1992	Non è la RAI	Herself / Host	Variety show (season 1)
1993	Seratissima	Herself / Host	Special
1993–1994	Canzoni spericolate	Herself / Host	Talent show (season 1)
1995	Cuori d'oro	Herself / Host	Variety show
1997	Partita del cuore	Herself / Host	Annual event
1998	Strada facendo	Herself / Co-host	Variety show
1999–2001	Festival di Napoli	Herself / Host	Annual event
2000–2006	Buona Domenica	Herself / Opinionist	Variety show (season 13-18)
2001–2006	Il mio migliore amico	Herself / Host	Talk show
2018–2020	La vita in diretta	Herself / Opinionist	Talk show
2019	Live - Non è la D'Urso	Herself / Opinionist	Variety show
2019–2020	Ho qualcosa da dirti	Herself / Host	Talk show
