= Dan Negru =

Romanian TV shows host

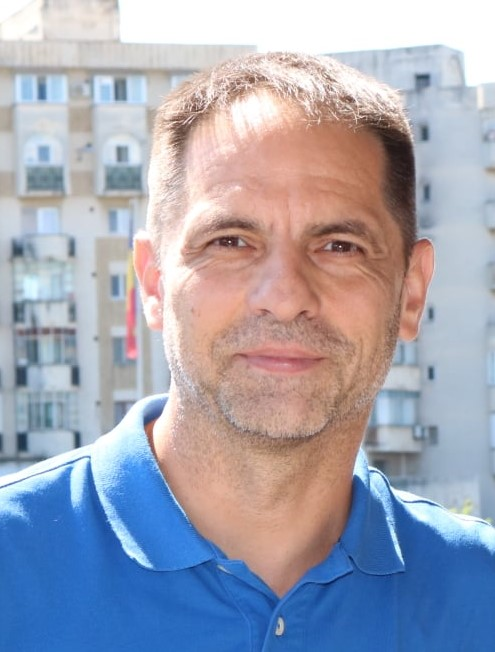
Dan Negru in 2021

Dan Negru (born 23 February 1971) is a Romanian TV presenter and host of the Romanian version of Star Factory.

== Host ==
He has hosted the following TV shows:

- "Academia Vedetelor"
- "Next Star"
- "Plasa de stele"
- "Beat the Blondes" (Te pui cu blondele?)
- "Demascarea"
- "Let's Make a Deal" (Batem Palma)
- "Ciao Darwin"
- "Ziua Judecății"
- "Competitia"
- "Genialii"
- "Money Drop" (Cu banii jos)
- "Minute to Win It" (Castigi in 60 de minute)
- "Jeux sans frontiers/Saint Tropez Games" (Jocuri la Saint Tropez)
- Festivals: Mamaia (1999, with Andreea Marin), Callatis (with Gabriel Cotabita)
- "Vreau sa fiu mare vedeta"
- "Vreau sa fiu stewardesa"
- "Divizia-Gazeta Sporturilor"
- "O seara de vis" (with Mihaela Radulescu)
- "Serifi de Romania"
- "Echipa Fantastica"
- Teledon (2001-2009), Teledon "Colectiv"(2015, with Mihai Gadea)
- Revelioane (1999–present)
- Guess my age (Ghiceste-mi varsta, 2018)
- "Who Wants to Be a Millionaire?" ("Vrei sa fii milionar?)
- "Star Academy" (Fabrica de Staruri)
- "Deal or No Deal" (Da sau Nu)
- "Wheel of Fortune" (Roata Norocului by Prime)

== Notes ==
- Un dobitoc!(dex-animal patruped)
