= Cristina Chiabotto =

Italian TV presenter, model and showgirl

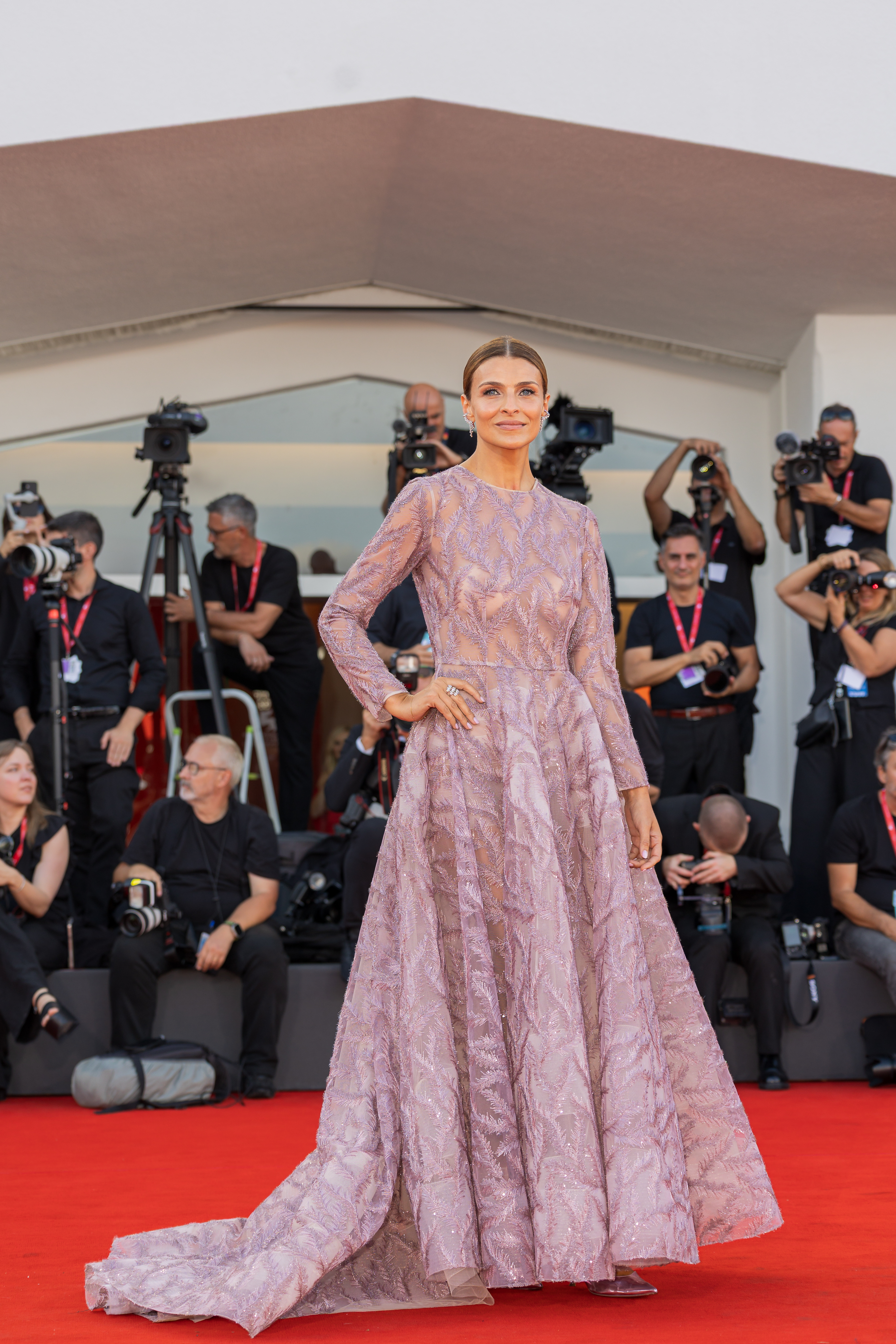
Cristina Chiabotto

Cristina Chiabotto (born 15 September 1986) is an Italian TV presenter, model and showgirl. She works as TV presenter for Juventus Channel.

Chiabotto was born in Moncalieri, in the province of Turin (Piedmont). She has a younger sister, Serena.

In 2004 she won Miss Italia and started working for RAI. After appearing on Zecchino d'Oro, a TV program for children in which she had a small role, she won the second series of the reality TV dance competition Ballando con le Stelle (the Italian version of Dancing With the Stars).

In 2006 she replaced Alessia Marcuzzi for Mediaset's program Le Iene and later worked on Festivalbar with Ilary Blasi. In 2008 she hosted Real TV, the Italian version of Real TV, on Italia 1.

She lives in Turin and supports Juventus; she also appeared with Alessandro Del Piero in a popular advertisement. She is 182 cm (6 ft 0 in) tall.

== Personal life ==
Chiabotto dated her Ballando con le Stelle co-star Fabio Fulco until 2017. On 21 September 2019, after a year of engagement, she married the entrepreneur Marco Roscio.

Cristina Chiabotto has had an operation for breast augmentation.

== TV programs ==
- Zecchino d'Oro – Rai 1 (2004)
- Miss Italia – Rai 1 (2005)
- Ballando con le Stelle – Rai 1 (2005-6, series 2)
- Le Iene – Italia 1 (2006)
- Festivalbar – Italia 1 (2006)
- Festival internazionale del Circo di Monte Carlo – Rai 3 (2006, 2010–11)
- Scherzi a parte – Canale 5 (2007)
- Wind Music Awards – Italia 1 (2007-8)
- Real TV – Italia 1 (2008)
- Controcampo – Rete 4 (2008-9)
- The Look of the Year – Italia 1 (2009)
- Fico+Fico Christmas Show – Italia 1 (2009–10)
- Ice Christmas galà – Italia 1 (2009–12)
- Ciak... si canta! – Rai 1 (2010)
- Miss Italia nel mondo – Rai 1 (2010)
- Tutti a scuola – Rai 1 (2010)
- Comedy Tour Risollevante – Comedy Central (2011–12)
- Juventus – Speciali stadi – SKY sport (2011)
- Capodanno on ice – Italia 1 (2012)
- Bau Boys – Italia 1 (2012)
- Soundtrack – Rai Movie (2013)

== Radio ==
- Pronto chi sei? – Radio Kiss Kiss (2011, 2013)

== Theater ==
- Ti ricordi il varietà? (2012)

== Advertising campaigns ==
Cristina has been the face of several advertising campaigns, such as those for Facco Corporation, Chateau d'Ax, Deborah, Rocchetta, Lotto and Cotonella. In 2007, during the twentieth edition of the Italian Grand Prix organized by Advertising, won the special prize show and Communication.

- Cotonella (2006)
- Rocchetta (2007-2011)
- Chateau d'Ax (2009-2011)
- Deborah (2009)
- Superenalotto (2010)
