= Sette e mezzo =

Italian comparing card game similar to blackjack

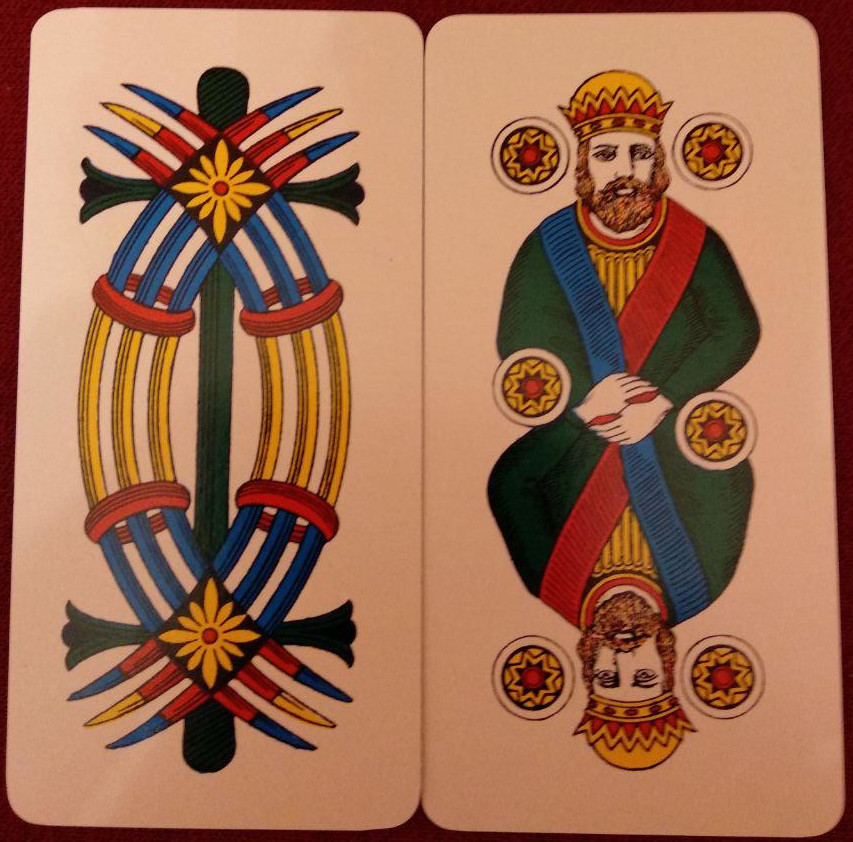
- A sette e mezzo reale
- Alternative names: Seven and a half
- Type: Comparing
- Players: 2–12, usually 4–6
- Skills: Probability
- Cards: 40
- Deck: Italian
- Play: Counterclockwise
- Chance: High

Sette e mezzo (Italian for 'seven and a half') is an Italian comparing card game similar to blackjack. In Spanish it is known as siete y media. It is traditionally played in Italy during Christmas holidays. The game is also known in English as seven and a half.

== Rules ==
Sette e mezzo is played with a 40-card deck, a standard deck with eights, nines, and tens removed. The value of cards ace through seven is their pip value (1 through 7), face cards are worth 1/2 point each. Players compete against the dealer, but not against each other. The objective of the game is to beat the dealer in one of the following ways:

- Get 7 1/2 points on the player's first two cards (called a reale or natural), without a dealer natural 7 1/2;
- Reach a final score higher than the dealer without exceeding 7 1/2; or
- Let the dealer draw additional cards until their hand exceeds 7 1/2.

The score of each player’s hand is calculated by adding the points of their cards.

Players must bet before receiving their first card, which is dealt face down. After receiving it, they must decide whether to stand (end their turn) or hit (receive another card). Players may stand or hit as long as they do not go bust (exceed 7 1/2). When a player goes bust they must show their face down card and immediately lose their bet, regardless of whether the dealer goes bust later. When a player achieves 7 1/2 they must announce it and show their face down card.

After all players had their turn, the dealer shows their face down card, then plays with the same rules as the other players. If the dealer goes bust, they must match the bet of all players who didn’t go bust. If the dealer doesn’t go bust, all players must show their face down card. The dealer wins against all players who scored lower or tied, collecting their bets, and loses against all players who scored higher paying them back 1:1. Whether a player with a natural 7 1/2 beats a dealer with a regular 7 1/2 depends on the variant being played.

If the role of dealer is not fixed, it is handed over in the direction of play after each hand. The new dealer shuffles the cards before dealing them.

=== Variants ===
- Wild card (Italian): the king of coins (or, if playing with French-suited cards, the queen of hearts) is a wild card and may take the value of any other card at the discretion of the owning player, as long as the player has at least another card in their hand. If it is the only card in the player’s hand, it is only worth 1/2. When playing with this variant, it is usually required to shuffle the cards at the end of the hand the wild card was dealt in.
- Royal 7: the 7 of coins overpowers all 7s even if the bank has 7 and the person gets paid.
- Royal 7 1/2: a natural 7 1/2 is paid 2:1 and the player who made it becomes the dealer (skipping the regular rotation). If two or more players make 7 1/2 at the same time with only two cards, the player closest to the dealer's right becomes the new dealer. If the dealer makes a natural 7 1/2, they’ll keep being the dealer for the next hand as well, and players might be required to pay double their bet (unless they obtained a natural 7 1/2 themselves).
- Triple 7 1/2: a certain hand is paid 3:1 (with the same rules as for the royal variant), this hand is either
  - a hand containing two 7s
  - a natural 7 1/2 with the face card being the wild card
- Burning: players whose first card is a 4 (or sometimes a 3) are allowed to burn it: the card is discarded it and the player receives a new (face-down) card from the dealer.
- Pot-play: the dealer putting an ante in the pot and then playing a single hand against each player in turn. The amount of money currently in the pot is the betting limit for the current hand. If a player wins, they collect their winnings from the pot, if they lose the bet stays in the pot, therefore the limit will be different for each player. After all players had their turn, the dealer collects the amount left in the pot.
- Splitting (Spanish): players are allowed to split their hand when they have a face card as their first (face down) card and are dealt another face card as their second hand. To do that, they must double down on their bet; they may then play each hand separately.
