= Happy Channel (Italy) =

Former Italian TV Channel

- Country: Italy

Programming
- Picture format: 4:3 SDTV

Ownership
- Owner: Sky Italia / Mediadigit

History
- Launched: 8 March 1998; 28 years ago
- Closed: 1 January 2006; 20 years ago

Happy Channel was an entertainment satellite TV owned by Mediadigit (created by Mediaset), on air from 8 March 1998 until 1 January 2006.

Happy Channel ran on the Tele + platform till 30 July 2003, when SKY Italia took the place of Tele + and Stream TV, another Italian satellitar platform. The channel was based on comic films, old American films and cabaret shows and often reran old shows and sitcom produced by Mediaset in the past for its three free on air channels, Canale 5, Italia 1 and Retequattro. Shows such as Non è la RAI, Ciao Darwin, Drive In and Colpo grosso were rerun. Some programs were produced expressly for the channel such as Space Girls or I Caruso - Sitshow a Little Italy.

The channel was directed by Carlo Vetrugno, who previously directed Italia 1 and Retequattro.
