= Ciao Darwin =

- Genre: Variety game show Comedy
- Created by: Paolo Bonolis; Stefano Magnaghi
- Directed by: Beppe Recchia (1998–03); Roberto Cenci (2007–24)
- Presented by: Paolo Bonolis and Luca Laurenti
- Theme music composer: Renato Zero; Renato Serio
- Opening theme: "Matti", performed by Renato Zero
- Composer: Danilo Aielli
- Country of origin: Italy
- Original language: Italian
- No. of seasons: 9

Production
- Executive producers: Mariella Meloni (1998-1999); Massimiliano Lancellotti (2000); Francesca Lucente (2003); Roberto Pizzi (2007); Antonella Carbone (2010–19, 2023–24)
- Producers: Giorgio Chessari (1998-2000, 2007); Walter H. Splait (2003); Bernardo De Lucchi (2010–19, 2023–24)
- Production locations: Rome; Cologno Monzese (S04 only)
- Cinematography: Corrado Bartoloni (1998); Gianni Mastropietro (1999-2000); Franco Fratus (2003); Massimo Pascucci (2007–10, 2019, 2023–24); Francesco De Cave (2016)
- Running time: 190 minutes approx.
- Production company: RTI

Original release
- Network: Canale 5
- Release: October 3, 1998 – February 23, 2024

Ciao Darwin is a variety game show format created and hosted by Paolo Bonolis (Stefano Magnaghi is the co-creator), and produced by the Italian mass media company Mediaset.

There are two competing teams of 50 people each, usually made up of people who fit certain opposing stereotypes. In each game, two members of the audience are selected at random, one from each team, indicated by a light in front of them which remains illuminated when all the other team members' lights have gone off. The games involve contestants competing in acts of skill, intelligence and general knowledge, with deliberately ridiculous results, trying to mimic the mechanism of natural selection theorized by Charles Darwin. Some of the games are designed to humiliate the contestants, especially an assault course which was introduced with the Italian version in 2010, and the Finale which is a water tank game.

At each round a score by a vote in the studio by the audience consisting of 300 people. The sum of points at the end of the various tests determines the team in the lead for the Finale.

== Original italian version ==
In Italy it was aired on Canale 5 from 1998 until 2000, hosted by Italian celebrities Paolo Bonolis and Luca Laurenti, and it returned again in 2003, 2007, 2010, 2016, 2019 and 2023–2024.

== Format ==
=== Early rounds ===
The early round in the show consists of singing a song, a debate between the two teams, an intelligence test and a test of courage.

=== The Obstacle Course (Italian version from 2010) ===
In the Obstacle Course round, officially called Genodrome, five or six randomly selected contestants from each team have to make their way around an assault course consisting mainly of:

- Crawling under nets, through cloth tubes or through elastic strings
- Climbing over a slippery slope and slide
- Crossing a pool by jumping onto unstable floating pontoons (series 6 & 7) or trying to dodge men in inflatable tubes (series 8)
- Crossing another pool by leaping along padded horizontal rotating rollers (series 6 to 8) or jumping in and squeezing between vertical rollers (series 9)
- Being carried across the pool by four further teammates (series 9)

Some contestants cannot make it up the slippery slope and are eliminated from the round. Points are awarded for each competitor who successfully gets to the end of the course, and further points are awarded if a further competitor who slides down a rope manages to attach themselves with Velcro to a target on a vertical wall.

In the Italian version in 2016, one variation is that fire hoses were played on the competitors as they try to cross the pontoons, and another variation involves them having to jump into the pool fully clothed and swim past the pontoons using inflatable rubber sharks as buoyancy aids.

The contestants are given trainer shoes, and elbow, knee and head protection. In series 6 to 8, they wore the outer garments they were wearing to the show over a short swimskin. In series 9, they are given a lifejacket for the pool-based part of the course but no swimskin, and remain fully dressed in the clothes they arrived in.

Almost all contestants get totally soaked in garments ranging from casual wear or fancy dress to expensive dresses or suits which are ruined by the water. The pools are approximately 1.3m deep and filled with cold water, and falling from the rollers resulted in total immersion.

=== The Fashion Show ===
This round consists of a fashion show featuring a number of competitors from each team dressed for different contexts: "daytime", "evening", "disco", "intimate male" and "intimate female".

=== The Finale ===
In the Finale, the two selected contestants sit in tanks that are filled with more water each time an incorrect answer is given (and, in the case of the Italian and Polish versions, each time the other contestant gives a correct answer). There are variations between the rules in the Italian, Romanian, Hungarian, Polish and Greek versions. The tank is cylindrical in shape in all but the Polish version, where it has flat sides. The tank is entered through a door in the back or side which is sealed when the game begins. The water rises by increments that are marked on the side of the tank (except in Poland). The number of these varies:

- Italy – six – the loser is the first tank to be filled to the sixth level
- Romania – ten – the loser is the first who cannot remain seated and hold their breath underwater, which usually happens after level 8 or 9
- Hungary – nine – the loser is the first who cannot remain seated and hold their breath underwater, which usually happens after level 8
- Poland and Greece – five - the loser is the first who cannot remain seated and hold their breath underwater, which usually happens after level 4

As with the Obstacle Course round, the contestants remain fully dressed and participate in the clothes that they were already wearing to the show, although they are allowed to take off their shoes (except in the Romanian version) and their jewellery (except in the Italian version).

The tanks are filled with an initial amount of water determined by the relative scores of the competing teams (usually one increment for every 50 points difference). Normally this is between one and three increments. In theory, it would be possible to answer all questions correctly and go away with just wet feet. In practice, however, the water level rises to at least chest height.

There have been some other strange variations, such as two people from the same team sitting together in the tank, contestants blindfolded, creatures like toads, snakes and ducks added, and dyed or foamy water being used. In all but the Hungarian version, contestants are given a snorkel to help them breathe, although this is seldom used. In the Hungarian and Polish versions, the rule about remaining seated is strictly enforced, and this often leads to the fully clothed contestants being totally under the water by the end.

The voice commentary in the official promotional video for the Ciao Darwin franchise states "each week a winner emerges triumphant, and the loser is left all wet", suggesting that they are not offered a dry change of clothes to go home.

== International versions ==
The format created in Italy has been sold in various countries around the world. The international rights are distributed by Distraction Formats.

Country	Name	TV channel	Year aired	Presenter(s)
China	你好达尔文; Nǐ hǎo Darwin	Liaoning TV	2011	Guo Degang
Greece	Γεια σου Δαρβίνε; Geia sou Darvine	ANT1	2008	Vangelis Perris
Hungary	Csaó Darwin!	TV2	2004–2006	Gábor Bochkor
Poland	Ciao Darwin	TVN	2004–2005	Piotr Szwedes
Romania	Ciao, Darwin!	Antena 1	2003–2005	Dan Negru
Serbia	Ćao Darvine	RTV Pink	2007–2008	Marinko Madžgalj and Ognjen Amidžić
Vietnam	Hội ngộ bất ngờ	HTV7	2007–2009	Thanh Bạch
