= Ilary Blasi =

Italian television host (born 1981)

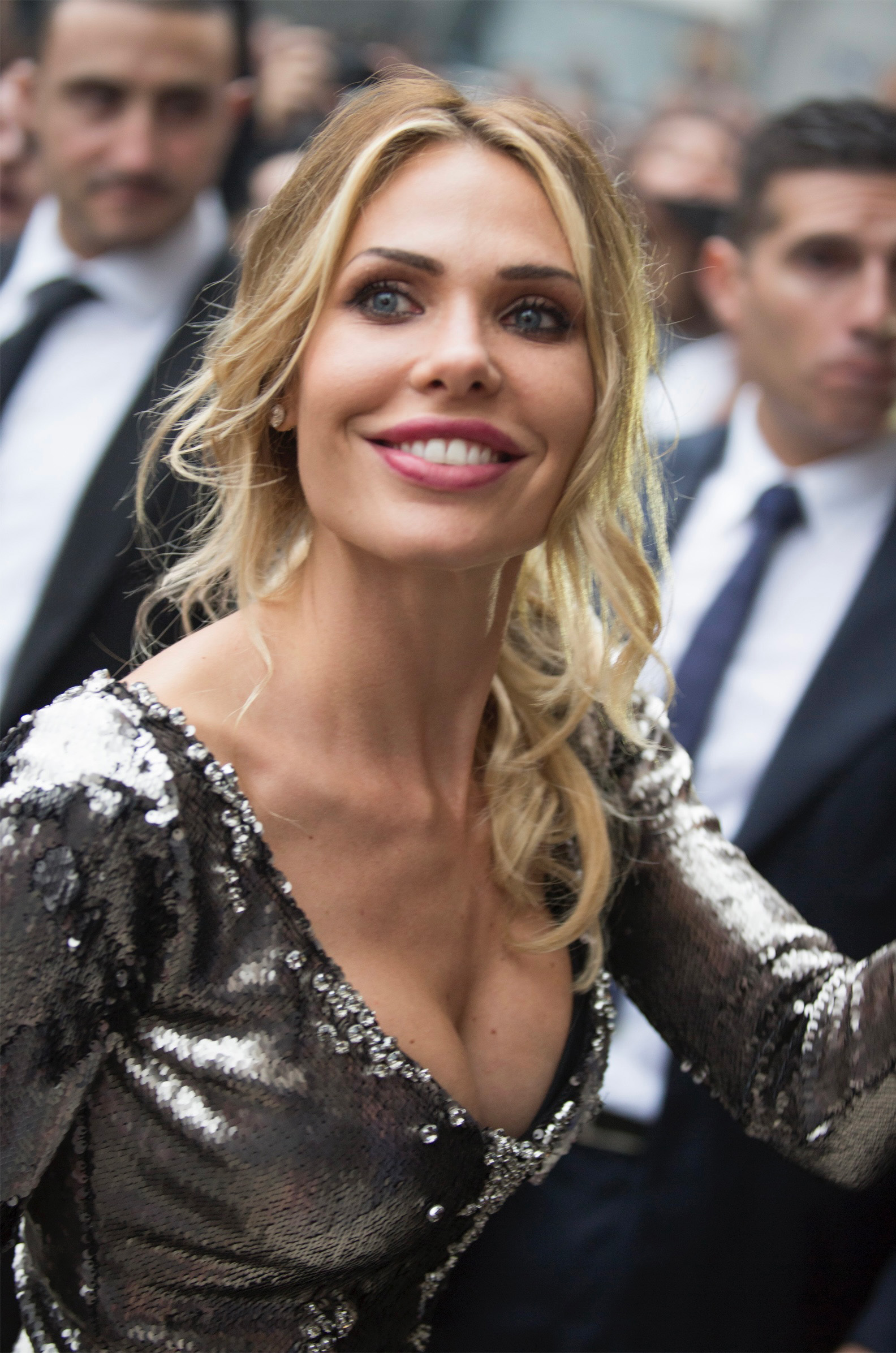
- Blasi in 2014
- Born: 28 April 1981 (age 45); Rome, Italy
- Occupation: Television host
- Spouse: Francesco Totti (m. 2005; sep. 2022)
- Children: 3

Ilary Blasi (Italian pronunciation: [ˈiːlari ˈblaːzi]; born 28 April 1981) is an Italian television host, former model and former child actress.

== Early life ==
Ilary was born in Rome, daughter of Roberto and Daniela. Her mother named her after one of her favourite Western movie heroines. Blasi has two sisters, Melory and Silvia. Blasi was introduced to showbusiness by her mother. As she declared in an interview, a neighbour told her mother that an agency was recruiting a blonde child with blue eyes for an advertisement of the "Panettone Galbusera"; Daniela brought Blasi to the casting, and she was selected for her first job.

== Career ==
=== Early career ===
She joined showbusiness very early. At the age of 3, Blasi shot her first TV ad; at 5 she debuted in the cinema with a little role in the film "David & David" directed by Giorgio Capitani; at 6 she was in the cast of "Da grande" of Franco Amurri (accredited as "Hilary Blasi") and "Vizio di vivere" by Dino Risi. Later she appeared in the film "Fiori di zucca" (1988) by Stefano Pomilia and "La dolce casa degli orrori" (1989) by Lucio Fulci. In that period she did testimonials for various advertisers, like the one for the oil "Cuore" with her whole family, "Cicciobello" doll, "Renault" cars and "Barilla Group", "Galbusera", "Findus", "Balocco" and "Sanson" (food).

=== In search of success ===
At the end of the 1990s Blasi tried different approaches to get back into show business; she worked as a model for the photo stories done by the "Lancio" publishing house, she posed nude for a few photoshoots and walked the runways for some of the fashion agencies in Rome, she joined a comedy at the Testaccio theatre in Rome, and competed in the Miss Italia pageant in 1998, with the number 22 at the age of 17 wearing the belt of "Miss Cinema Lazio". She had her first TV role, although it would not influence the course of her career, by joining the cast of the 1999 edition of Scherzi a parte. As Blasi wanted to continue to work in TV, after two years spent participating in many castings, all with a negative response, she decided to make a last attempt. She applied to the casting for the pre-dinner quiz game of Canale 5 Passaparola hosted by Gerry Scotti and she was recruited for the 2001/2002 edition.

=== Fame ===
==== Regular presence on TV ====
Ilary Blasi finally began her real TV career on 10 September 2001, debuting in Passaparola as one of the six members of the dance troupe, called "Letterine" (which means "little letters" as the show is about word games). To complete the dancing cast there were the veterans Daniela Bello, Silvia Toffanin and Alessia Fabiani and the newly hired Alessia Ventura and Ludmilla Radtchenko. During the 2002/2003 edition Blasi was in her second season as a Letterina as was Alessia Ventura, and they were joined by Federica Villani, Cosmanna Ardillo, Francesca Lodo and Morena Salvino.

Once the experience as a Letterina was over in June 2003, moved to the channel "Rai2" to host the summer edition of the musical format "Top of the pop" together with Alvin, touring between the cities of Diamante, Cagliari and Tempio Pausania and presenting two shows per week (Saturday at 2pm and Thursday at 10:40 pm).

In September 2003 Blasi was beside Fabio Fazio in his new show Che tempo che fa (How's the weather), broadcast on "Rai3" until May 2004. In the show, on-air from Friday to Sunday, Blasi was committed to introducing the connection with the various correspondents, presenting the special guests in the studio and reading the weather forecast at the end of the episode. From January 2004, to celebrate 50 years of the Italian public broadcaster "Rai", Blasi made a little runway every Saturday wearing a dress used in TV shows that are considered to be milestones in the history of Rai.

On 8 March 2004, as part of the Italian women's day, she hosted a special episode of "Le Iene show", joining Luca Bizzarri and Paolo Kessisoglu (who normally host the show) together with Elisabetta Canalis and Kasia Smutniak.

From 18 September 2004, she came back to host again with Alvin, for the Italian edition of "Cd:Live" on Rai 2. Meanwhile, she continued her experience beside Fabio Fazio in the new season of "Che tempo che fa" on Rai3, till 9 April 2005. On that day she was interviewed live by Fazio and she admitted in public to being pregnant. At the 3rd month she let the audience know to expect the baby by the end of October and her boyfriend confirmed the news with a phone call while on air. Blasi was to be replaced by the Swedish show-girl Filippa Lagerback. Instead her last episode of "CD:Live" was broadcast on 4 June with her showing a curvier silhouette and she introduced the girl who would play her role: Giorgia Palmas.

Still, in 2006, she hosted the edition of Festivalbar with Mago Forest and Cristina Chiabotto.

From 15 January 2007 she once again joined the duo of comedians "Luca e Paolo" (Bizzarri and Kessisoglu) to host "Le Iene" and at the end of the season, May 2007, she was at the end of her second pregnancy.

In September 2007 she hosted a show from the "Gialappa's band" with Forest "Mai dire candid". The show was on air during peak time before "Le Iene", broadcast at late night always with Blasi and "Luca e Paolo".

In September 2008 she was joined by Fabio De Luigi, who replaces Luca e Paolo for the autumn edition of "le Iene". In 2009 the duo went back with Blasi and they kept on hosting "Le Iene" until spring 2011. After the summer of 2011 Ilary hosted the show with actor Luca Argentero and comedian Enrico Brignano until November 2011. The 2012 edition started with Blasi and Brignano joined by the actor Alessandro Gassman during the first episodes, replaced then by the showman Pippo Baudo for only one special episode, and the actor Claudio Amendola till the end of the season.

==== Advertising ====
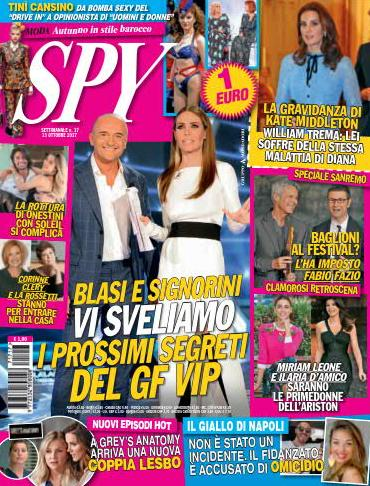
Spy Cover 13-october-2017 Mondadori

Her first role in an advertisement after joining Passaparola goes back to June 2002 and was made to promote the suntanning products of the "Bilboa" brand.

In October 2002 the fashion brand "Bon Bon" booked Blasi to be the model of the fall/winter catalogue, before repeating for the next collection spring/summer 2003.

In March 2003 she worked as a designer for the British brand Miss Criminal (second brand of the more popular Criminal), created her collection that would be presented on 23 April of the same year in Ravenna, and later even in Milan, Turin and Palermo.

At the end of March 2004, the lingerie brand Emmecì chose her as the model for the "Malandrina" collection and she appeared in the catalogue dressed only with bras, strings and thongs.

From 1 January 2005, the Vicenza-based jewel company Comete picked her to represent their collection, placing her beside her partner Francesco Totti, already brand ambassador of the company.

During 2007 she's modelling for the catalogue of eyewear Vogue, posing for both printed and web campaign.

Prior to the launch of the fall/winter 07/08 collection, Ilary becomes ambassador of the fitness clothing brand Eke.

From October 2007 till 2011 she is the testimonial of a series of commercials for the mobile networking company Vodafone, shot with her husband Francesco Totti and A.C. Milan midfielder Gennaro Gattuso, and later with the comedian Flavio Insinna, TV host Francesco Facchinetti, singer Cesare Cremonini and Luca&Paolo from Le Iene.

From 2010 she is the testimonial of the jewelry chain Stroili oro, she inaugurate two flagship stores in Milan and Rome promoting the launch of the new silver and golden tattoos created by the company.

== Personal life ==
Blasi married Francesco Totti, a professional footballer at the time, on 19 June 2005 at the Basilica of Santa Maria in Aracoeli. Their wedding was aired on television with the proceeds being donated to charity. They had their first child, Cristian, on 6 November 2005. Their second child, a daughter named Chanel, was born on 13 May 2007. The couple has often been referred to as the "Italian Beckhams" and their private lives are often speculated upon in Italian magazines and tabloids. On 10 March 2016, the couple had their third child, Isabel. On 11 July 2022, it was announced that Totti and Blasi had separated.

Ilary has been in a relationship with German entrepreneur Bastian Müller following her separation from her ex-husband Francesco Totti. The couple married in September 2026.

== Filmography ==
=== As an actress ===
Year	Title	Role	Notes
1987	Da grande	Piera	Feature film debut
1988	Il vizio di vivere	Little girl	Cameo appearance
1989	The Sweet House of Horrors	Sarah	Television film
1990	Fiori di zucca	Lisa	
2025	Real Men	Herself	Cameo; episode: "Tutto il resto è noia"

=== Other appearances ===
Year	Title	Role	Notes
1998	Miss Italia	Herself/ Contestant	Annual beauty contest
2001–2003	The Alphabet Game	Herself/ Co-host	Game show
2003	Top of the Pops	Herself/ Host	Musical program
2003–2005	Che tempo che fa	Herself/ Co-host	Talk show (seasons 1–2)
2006	Festivalbar	Herself/ Co-host	Annual music festival
2007–2018	Le Iene	Herself/ Host	Seasons 11–22
2014	Zelig	Herself/ Guest host	Episode dated November 13, 2014
2016–2018; 2026–present	Grande Fratello VIP	Herself/ Host	Reality show (seasons 1–3, 8–present)
2018	Summer Festival	Herself/ Host	Annual music festival
2019	Eurogames	Herself/ Host	Game show
2021–2023	L'Isola dei Famosi	Herself/ Host	Reality show (season 15–17)
2023	Unica	Herself	Documentary special
2025	The Couple	Herself/ Host	Reality show
