= Beatrice Luzzi =

Italian actress and television writer (born 1970)

- Born: Beatrice Luzzi; 14 November 1970 (age 55); Rome, Italy
- Occupations: Actress and television writer
- Height: 1.67 m (5 ft 5.75 in)

Beatrice Luzzi (born 14 November 1970) is an Italian actress and television writer.

== Biography ==
After graduating from the classical high school "Terenzio Mamiani" in Rome, she began her theatrical activity there. She graduated with honors in political science at Sapienza with a thesis on the gender perspective in development aid and spent two years in Brussels on an internship at the Directorate-General for Humanitarian Aid of the European Commission.

Back in Italy, she began working both as an author at Rai (from RadioUnoJazz to Viva la radio! with Lino Banfi and Carmen Di Pietro at TG Ragazzi within Solletico) and as an actress in various commercials such as that of the San Paolo in Turin with Vittorio and Alessandro Gassmann and that of the Fiat Multipla with Michael Schumacher. Success came with her participation in the soap opera on Canale 5 Vivere where she played, from 1999 to 2001, the role of Eva Bonelli. The experience of Vivere was followed by participation as co-star in the series Giorni da Leone and Sospetti, the hosting of Linea verde and the activity of commentator in various talk shows such as La vita in diretta and L'Italia sul 2.

In the theater she collaborated with Nando dalla Chiesa for the show Poliziotta per amore, thanks to which she won the Giancarlo Siani Prize in 2007, and Aldo Cazzullo for the adaptation of his book Le donne erediteranno la Terra.

After a few years spent working behind the scenes as a text adapter for the Rai 1 quiz L'eredità, she returned in front of the cameras from 11 September 2023 to 25 March 2024 when she participated as a contestant in the seventeenth edition of Grande Fratello, broadcast on Canale 5 and hosted by Alfonso Signorini. In the reality show, on 26 February 2024, she became the first finalist, winning the televoting challenge to enter the final with 60% of the votes out of 4 contestants and at the end of the reality show she ranked second with 45% of the votes, being beaten by Perla Vatiero with 55%; she holds the record for nominations (111) and televotes surpassed in first place (19) in the entire history of the reality show. In the next edition of the reality show, broadcast from September 16, 2024, she plays the role of commentator together with Cesara Buonamici.

== Personal life ==
In the summer of 2004 she had a flirt with the actor Gerard Butler. Later, she had been the partner of Alessandro Cisilin from 2007 to 2019. Luzzi has two children. She consider herself Christian but not Catholic.

=== Political and social commitment ===
Since 2007, she has collaborated with the Libera association for which, in the same year, she directed the documentary Italia Nostra Cosa. In 2008, she presented the event for CittadinanzAttiva Trent'anni di diritti a tinte forti and, from 2010 to 2013, she collaborated with Federculture, first as coordinator of the Committee for youth and children's orchestras and choirs and then as organizer of the presentation at the Chamber of Deputies Una strategia per la Cultura, una strategia per il Paese. Finally, in 2013, she organized the event Veneto Cantiere Cultura with the patronage of the Veneto Region.

== Filmography ==
=== Cine ===
Year	Title	Role	Director
2002	Swept Away	Rich lady	Guy Ritchie
2005	L'apocalisse delle scimmie	Azzurra	Romano Scavolini
2015	80 voglia di te	Flavia	Andrea Vialardi and Silvia Monga
2020	Dreams - Il calore dei sogni	Margherita	Andrea Mazza and Silvia Monga

=== TV series ===
Year	Title	Role	Notes
1999–2001	Vivere	Eva Bonelli	TV series, 2097 episodes
2002	Giorni da Leone		TV movie directed by Francesco Barilli
2003	Il maresciallo Rocca	Adriana Bosetti	TV series, episode 4x05
2004	Don Matteo	Gemma Marabini	TV series, episode 4x17
2005	Sospetti		TV series, 6 episodes
2005	Call center		TV series
2006	Giorni da Leone 2		TV series, 4 episodes
2008	Provaci ancora prof!	Stella De Leonardi Bertani	TV series, 1 episode
2009	Medici miei	Actress	TV series
2010	Tutti per Bruno	La Valchiria	TV series, episode 1x06
2012	I Cesaroni		TV series
2013	Rex		TV series, episode 5x02
2016	L'allieva		TV series, episode 1x05
2017	Solo per amore 2 - Destini incrociati	Sara Desideri	TV series, episodes 2x01, 2x02, 2x03
2017	Un posto al sole		TV series

== Commercials ==
Year	Title	Director	Notes
1997	Sottilette Kraft	Jean-Paul Rappeneau	
1997	Istituto bancario San Paolo		With Vittorio and Alessandro Gassmann
1998	Fiat Multipla		With Michael Schumacher
1998	Kinder Ferrero		

== Theater ==
Year	Title	Author	Director	Director
1985	Più giallo di così...	Seàn-Patrick Lovett		
1985	È soltanto una questione di tempo	Seàn-Patrick Lovett		
2000	Terra e poeti	Beatrice Luzzi		
2001	Luce sull'aldilà	Beatrice Luzzi		
2001	Il canto delle sirene	Edoardo Siravo		
2002	La bisbetica domata	William Shakespeare	Alessandro Capone	With Nathalie Caldonazzo
2004–2006	Le lettere di Miguel. I desaparecidos dell'Argentina	Beatrice Luzzi		
2006	Sex in the City	Luca Biglione	Fabio Crisafi	With Silvia Rocca and Beppe Convertini
2007	Squali - Una storia vera, un sogno	Duccio Forzano and Paola Conte	Duccio Forzano	From an idea by Alberto Luca Recchi, with Alberto Luca Recchi, Giulia Ottonello and Carlo Ragone
2007–2010	Poliziotta per amore	Nando dalla Chiesa	Claudio Boccaccini	
2017	Coniugi	Eric Assous	Giancarlo Fares	With Roberto D'Alessandro
2017–2018	Le donne erediteranno la Terra	Aldo Cazzullo	Beatrice Luzzi	

== Television program ==
Year	Title	Network	Role
1998–1999	TG Ragazzi	Rai 1	Author
2002–2003	Linea verde	Rai 1	
2003	La moda oltre i confini della Terra	Rai 1	
2003–2004	Un giorno speciale	Rai 1	
2004–2006	L'Italia sul 2	Rai 2	Opinionist
2005–2006	Guida al Verde	Alice	
2007–2008	GAP - Generazioni alla prova	Rai 3	Sent
2010–2011	Dillo a Lorena	Rai 2	Opinionist
2011	A ruota libera	Rai Scuola	Author
2017–2023	L'eredità	Rai 1	Collaborator to the texts
2023–2024	Grande Fratello	Canale 5	Herself / Contestant
2024–2025	Grande Fratello	Canale 5	Opinionist
2024–present	Pomeriggio Cinque	Canale 5	Opinionist

== Radio ==
Year	Title	Network	Role
1996	Viva la Radio!	Rai Radio 2	Author
1997	Stasera a Via Asiago 10	Rai Radio 2	Author

== Works ==
- Luzzi, Beatrice (2011). Mi è nata una famiglia : diario pratico e sentimentale di una vita allegramente stravolta ; con tre interventi di Alessandro Cisilin (in Italian). Milan: Morellini. ISBN 978-88-6298-173-6.

== Awards ==
Year	Award	Category
1997	Telegatto	Television writers
1999	Telegatto	Interpretation
2007	Giancarlo Siani Award	
2008	The Country of Women Award	
2010	Rocco Chinnici Award	
2017	Giuseppe Moscati Award	
