= Cesara Buonamici =

Italian journalist and television presenter (born 1957)

- Born: Cesara Buonamici; 2 January 1957 (age 69); Fiesole, Tuscany, Italy
- Occupations: Journalist and television presenter
- Spouse: Joshua Kalman (m. 2022)
- Father: Cesare Buonamici

Cesara Buonamici (born 2 January 1957) is an Italian journalist and television presenter.

Active since the 1970s, she began her career by curating various journalistic columns for the Fininvest networks, later becoming one of the symbolic faces of TG5, for which she has worked since its launch on 13 January 1992.

== Biography ==
=== The beginnings ===
Sister of the Florentine nobleman Cesare Buonamici, Cesara was born in 1957 in Fiesole on the family property. She began her career during her university studies (she graduated in pharmacy) at Tele Libera Firenze, a broadcaster in the Tuscan capital, at the end of the seventies, hosting the news, some quizzes and a forerunner of modern talk shows (Quattro chiacchiere con Cesara). Having become very popular with Tuscan viewers, she wrote her first articles for the Florentine newspaper La Città, which belongs to Mauro Ballini, also owner of Tele Libera Firenze.

In 1982, the Tuscan broadcaster was absorbed by Rete 4, owned by the Arnoldo Mondadori Editore group; Buonamici then began working for the Milanese publisher. She moved to Fininvest with the sale of the channel to Silvio Berlusconi's group. During that period, she curated several journalistic programs: first a column within Buongiorno Italia, then Dentro la notizia, Parlamento in and Canale 5 News. Cesara Buonamici became a professional journalist in 1987.

=== Career at TG5, various specials and Grande Fratello ===
After having debuted the Italia 1 news program Studio Aperto with Emilio Fede, she was one of the founders, together with Enrico Mentana, Lamberto Sposini, Cristina Parodi and Clemente Mimun, of TG5, which she has hosted since its birth on 13 January 1992. She hosted the 1:00 pm edition together with Emilio Carelli until 2000. Her biggest scoop was on the occasion of the referendum of 18 April 1999 (question on the abolition of the proportional quota in the elections of the Chamber of Deputies), when late at night she interrupted her director Enrico Mentana in the studio, being the first to announce that the quorum had not been reached, which had been taken for granted. She was subsequently promoted to host the main 8:00 pm edition.

On 13 June 2001, as a television host, she presented the zero episode of the reality show Diario – Esperimento d'amore on Canale 5. In June 2004, she received the award for the journalism section in Alghero during the 10th edition of the Alghero Donna national prize for literature and journalism.

In the summer of 2018 she became deputy director of TG5. In 2023 he collaborated with Gardaland for the show Nautilus; a show staged at the Gardaland Theatre.

On 12 and 13 June 2023, together with Nicola Porro and Paolo Del Debbio, she hosted the TG5 special on the death of Silvio Berlusconi in simulcast on the three Mediaset networks on the first evening and on Canale 5 on the second evening. From 11 September of the same year to 25 March 2024 she was a commentator on the seventeenth edition of Grande Fratello hosted by Alfonso Signorini. In November 2023 she became director ad "personam" of TG5. Since the same year she has been a recurring commentator on the program Pomeriggio Cinque. Since 16 September 2024 she has been reconfirmed as a commentator on the eighteenth edition of Grande Fratello, this time together with Beatrice Luzzi.

== Personal life ==
In 2020 the journalist experienced a non-serious trigeminal neuralgia, which caused her left eyelid to droop.

In 2022 she married Joshua Kalman, an Israeli doctor, after twenty-four years of engagement. The couple has no children.

== Controversies ==
In 2006 she was suspended for six months from the Lazio Order of Journalists, after the revelation of telephone interceptions by the Potenza prosecutor's office: the public prosecutor Henry Woodcock had discovered that the journalist recommended the entrepreneur Ugo Bonazza to the minister of the environment Matteoli to unblock a Monopoli case, negotiating over the phone a fee of 10,000 euros (Buonamici later denied to the magistrate that she had ever actually received them). The journalist returned to hosting the evening edition of TG5 on 14 May 2007.

In the 2023–2024 season, during her experience as a commentator on the seventeenth edition of Grande Fratello, she aroused a considerable level of criticism due to her constant tendency to oppose Beatrice Luzzi during the reality show. This dynamic generated divergent opinions, giving rise to a wide debate on Buonamici's conduct during the television experience in question.

== Television programs ==
Year	Title	Network			Role
1988–1997	Parlamento in	Canale 5			Conductor
1991–1992	Studio Aperto	Italia 1			Conductor
1992–present	TG5	Canale 5			Conductor
1992–present	Speciale TG5	Canale 5			Conductor
2001	Diario – Esperimento d'amore	Canale 5			Conductor
2001	Verissimo – Speciale Carlo e Diana vent'anni dopo	Canale 5			Conductor
2010	Let's Dance	Canale 5			Herself / Contestant
2011	Royal Wedding	Canale 5			Conductor
2019	Segreti e delitti	Canale 5			Conductor
2023	Speciale TG5 – Addio a Silvio Berlusconi	Canale 5	Italia 1	Rete 4	Conductor
2023–2025	Grande Fratello	Canale 5			Opinionist
2023–2025	Pomeriggio Cinque	Canale 5			Recurring opinionist

== Filmography ==
=== Actress ===
==== Film ====
Year	Title	Director
2011	Box Office 3D: The Filmest of Films (Box Office 3D – Il film dei film)	Ezio Greggio
2011	Wedding in Paris (Matrimonio a Parigi)	Claudio Risi

==== Television ====
Year	Title	Network	Notes
2000	Distretto di Polizia	Canale 5	TV series, episode 1x18
2010	R.I.S. Roma – Delitti imperfetti	Canale 5	TV series, episode 1x18

== Awards and nominations ==
Year	Award	Category	Results	Notes
2022	Alferano Award		Won	
2022	Golden San Michele Award	Award for thirty years of hosting TG5	Won	
2023	Flaiano Award for Television and Radio (Journalism Section)	Special Lifetime Achievement Award	Won	
