= Grande Fratello season 3 =

Grande Fratello
- Season 3
- Presented by: Barbara D'Urso
- No. of days: 99
- No. of housemates: 16
- Winner: Floriana Secondi
- Runner-up: Victoria Pennington

Release
- Original network: Canale 5
- Original release: 30 January – 8 May 2003

Season chronology
- ← Previous; Season 2 Next → Season 4

Grande Fratello 3 is the third season of the Italian version of the reality show franchise Big Brother. The show began on 30 January 2003 and concluded on 8 May 2003. Barbara D'Urso as the main host of the show for the first time.

== Production ==
It marked a turning point in the way the show was produced when compared to previous seasons.

=== House ===
The size of the house was increased to almost 3,500 square feet (330 m^{2}) and was made almost entirely of glass.

=== Nomination ===
This year the nominations process was changed. Unlike previous years, this year the Housemates would each week nominate three of their fellow Housemates for eviction rather than two as in previous years.

=== Luxury Suite ===
In this season, a luxury suite was introduced. It's a soft room filled with every luxury that the Housemates were not allowed in the main house. Every week the winner of a task would be allowed access to this room, along with one Housemate of their choice. The winner of this task was also allowed to purchase some gifts for themselves or their companion, from the prize fund (up to 300,000 euros this year).

== Housemates ==
Twelve Housemates entered the Big Brother House on opening night, with four Housemates joining later.

Housemates	Age	Birthplace	Occupation	Day entered	Day exited	Status
Floriana Secondi	25	Rome	Bartender	1	99	Winner
Victoria Pennington	19	Plano, U.S.	Swimming teacher	1	99	Runner-up
Luca Argentero	24	Turin	Bartender	1	99	3rd Place
Franco Biccica	28	Florence	Trader	71	99	4th Place
Marianella Bargilli	31	Cecina	Hostess	1	92	11th Evicted
Claudia Bormioli	25	Macerata	Student	1	85	10th Evicted
Manila Barbati	28	Milan	Dance teacher	71	78	9th Evicted
Pasquale Laricchia	30	Bari	Personal Trainer	1	78	8th Evicted
Fedro Francioni	33	Terni	Entrepreneur	1	67	Walked
Angela Sozio	29	Bari	Administrative manager	1	57	7th Evicted
Andrea Francolino	23	Bari	Sculptor	1	43	6th Evicted
Raffaello Orselli	35	Piombino	Skipper	8	36	5th Evicted
Sergio Squillacciotti	32	Naples	Sales representative	1	29	4th Evicted
Marika Suppa	26	Corato	Waitress	1	15	3rd Evicted
Massimo Zino	25	Rome	Student	8	8	2nd Evicted
Erika Terzi	26	Trescore Balneario	Flight attendant	1	1	1st Evicted

== Nominations table ==
	Week 1		Week 2	Week 4	Week 5	Week 6	Week 8	Week 10	Week 11	Week 12	Week 13	Week 14 Final		Nominations received
	Day 1	Day 8	Week 2	Week 4	Week 5	Week 6	Week 8	Week 10	Week 11	Week 12	Week 13	Week 14 Final		Nominations received
Floriana	Marika	No; Nominations	Marianella, Pasquale, Victoria	Marianella, Sergio, Victoria	Claudia, Marianella, Raffaello	Andrea, Claudia, Marianella	Fedro, Pasquale, Victoria	Fedro, Luca, Marianella	Luca, Pasquale, Victoria	Luca, Marianella, Victoria	Luca, Marianella, Victoria	Winner (Day 99)		44
Victoria	Marika	No; Nominations	Andrea, Floriana, Mairka	Andrea, Fedro, Floriana	Claudia, Fedro, Luca	Andrea, Claudia, Marianella	Angela, Fedro, Floriana	Claudia, Fedro, Marianella	Floriana, Luca, Marianella	Claudia, Floriana, Luca	Franco, Luca, Marianella	Runner-up (Day 99)		44
Luca	Erika	No; Nominations	Claudia, Pasquale, Victoria	Floriana, Pasquale, Victoria	Pasquale, Raffaello, Victoria	Floriana, Pasquale, Victoria	Claudia, Floriana, Victoria	Floriana, Pasquale, Victoria	Floriana, Pasquale, Victoria	Claudia, Franco, Victoria	Floriana, Franco, Victoria	Third place (Day 99)		13
Franco	Not in House								Manila	Claudia, Floriana, Marianella	Luca, Marianela, Victoria	Fourth place (Day 99)		6
Marianella	Marika	No; Nominations	Floriana, Pasquale, Victoria	Angela, Floriana, Pasquale	Pasquale, Raffaello, Victoria	Angela, Pasquale, Victoria	Angela, Floriana, Victoria	Floriana, Pasquale, Victoria	Floriana, Pasquale, Victoria	Floriana, Franco, Victoria	Floriana, Franco, Victoria	Evicted (Day 92)		17
Claudia	Marika	No; Nominations	Floriana, Pasquale, Victoria	Angela, Floriana, Pasquale	Floriana, Pasquale, Victoria	Floriana, Pasquale, Victoria	Floriana, Pasquale, Victoria	Floriana, Pasquale, Victoria	Floriana, Pasquale, Victoria	Floriana, Franco, Victoria	Evicted (Day 85)			15
Manila	Not in House								Manila	Evicted (Day 78)				N/A
Pasquale	Marika	No; Nominations	Andrea, Floriana, Marika	Fedro, Floriana, Sergio	Claudia, Fedro, Raffaello	Andrea, Claudia, Fedro	Angela, Fedro, Floriana	Fedro, Luca, Marianella	Floriana, Luca, Marianella	Evicted (Day 78)				38
Fedro	Marika	No; Nominations	Floriana, Pasquale, Victoria	Floriana, Pasquale, Victoria	Floriana, Pasquale, Victoria	Floriana, Pasquale, Victoria	Claudia, Floriana, Victoria	Floriana, Pasquale, Victoria	Walked (Day 67)					13
Angela	Erika	No; Nominations	Luca, Marianella, Pasquale	Fedro, Marianella, Sergio	Claudia, Fedro, Raffaello	Andrea, Claudia, Marianella	Marianella, Pasquale, Victoria	Evicted (Day 57)						7
Andrea	Marika	No; Nominations	Floriana, Marika, Pasquale	Floriana, Pasquale, Victoria	Floriana, Pasquale, Victoria	Floriana, Pasquale, Victoria	Evicted (Day 43)							7
Raffaello	Not in House	Nominated	Exempt	Floriana, Pasquale, Sergio	Angela, Floriana, Pasquale	Evicted (Day 36)								5
Sergio	Marika	No; Nominations	Marika, Pasquale, Victoria	Floriana, Pasquale, Victoria	Evicted (Day 29)									4
Marika	Nominated	No; Nominations	Luca, Pasquale, Victoria	Evicted (Day 15)										3
Massimo	Not in House	Nominated	Evicted (Day 8)											N/A
Erika	Nominated	Evicted (Day 1)												N/A
Notes	1	2	3	4	5	none		6	7	none		8		
Nominated For Eviction	Erika, Victoria	Massimo, Victoria	Floriana, Marika, Victoria	Floriana, Sergio, Victoria	Claudia, Pasquale, Raffaello, Victoria	Andrea, Claudia, Floriana, Pasquale, Victoria	Angela, Fedro, Floriana, Pasquale, Victoria	~~Fedro~~, Floriana, Marianella, Pasquale, Victoria	Floriana, Luca, Pasquale, Victoria	Claudia, Floriana, Franco, Victoria	Franco, Luca, Marianella, Victoria	Floriana, Franco, Luca, Victoria		
Nominated For Eviction	Erika, Victoria	Massimo, Victoria	Floriana, Marika, Victoria	Floriana, Sergio, Victoria	Claudia, Pasquale, Raffaello, Victoria	Andrea, Claudia, Floriana, Pasquale, Victoria	Angela, Fedro, Floriana, Pasquale, Victoria	~~Fedro~~, Floriana, Marianella, Pasquale, Victoria	Franco, Manila	Claudia, Floriana, Franco, Victoria	Franco, Luca, Marianella, Victoria	Floriana, Franco, Luca, Victoria		
Walked	none							Fedro	none					
Evicted	Erika; 2 of 10 votes to save	Massimo; 34% to save	Marika; 46% to evict	Sergio; 57% to evict	Raffaello; 44% to evict	Andrea; 39% to evict	Angela; 33% to evict	Eviction cancelled	Pasquale; 33% to evict	Claudia; 47% to evict	Marianella; 69% to evict	Franco; 2% to win	Luca; 9% to win	
Evicted	Erika; 2 of 10 votes to save	Massimo; 34% to save	Marika; 46% to evict	Sergio; 57% to evict	Raffaello; 44% to evict	Andrea; 39% to evict	Angela; 33% to evict	Eviction cancelled	Manila; Franco & Manila's choice to evict	Claudia; 47% to evict	Marianella; 69% to evict	Franco; 2% to win	Luca; 9% to win	
Survived	Victoria; 8 of 10 votes	Victoria; 66%		Floriana; 25% Victoria; 18%	Claudia; 33% Pasquale; 20% Victoria; 3%		Fedro; 23% Pasquale; 22% Floriana; 16% Victoria; 6%		Luca; 25% Floriana; 22% Victoria; 20%	Franco; 27% Floriana; 14% Victoria; 12%		Victoria; 44% to win	Floriana; 46% to win	

=== Notes ===
- ^Note 1: On Day 1, Erika and Marika were nominated by Big Brother. Their fellow housemates voted and Erika was evicted.
- ^Note 2: On Day 8, Massimo and Raffaello entered the house and the public had to vote for one of them to stay.
- ^Note 3: Victoria won the weekly task and chose Pasquale to be immune from nomination.
- ^Note 4: Pasquale won the weekly task and chose Victoria to be immune from nomination.
- ^Note 5: Floriana won the weekly task and chose herself to be immune from nomination.
- ^Note 6: After Fedro left the house after learning of his aunt's death, the eviction this week was cancelled.
- ^Note 7: Couple Franco and Manila entered the house together, and after a week had to choose one of them to leave. Manila chose to be the one to leave and left the house immediately.
- ^Note 8: This week, the public was voting for who they wanted to win, rather than to evict.

== TV Ratings ==
Episode	Date	Viewers	Share
1	30 January 2003	8,487,000	35,00%
2	6 February 2003	7,450,000	29,12%
3	13 February 2003	7,785,000	30,38%
4	20 February 2003	7,313,000	28,86%
5	27 February 2003	7,624,000	31,04%
6	6 March 2003	7,441,000	29,02%
7	13 March 2003	8,095,000	32,86%
8	20 March 2003	8,179,000	35,19%
9	27 March 2003	8,421,000	33,85%
10	3 April 2003	8,274,000	32,15%
11	10 April 2003	8,938,000	34,62%
12	17 April 2003	8,498,000	33,84%
13	24 April 2003	8,519,000	32,50%
Semifinal	1 May 2003	8,184,000	33,70%
Final	8 May 2003	10,694,000	45,11%
Average		8,260,000	33,15%
