= Grande Fratello season 8 =

Grande Fratello
- Season 8
- Presented by: Alessia Marcuzzi
- No. of days: 92
- No. of housemates: 21
- Winner: Mario Ferretti
- Runner-up: Teresa Stinziani

Release
- Original network: Canale 5
- Original release: 21 January – 21 April 2008

Season chronology
- ← Previous; Season 7 Next → Season 9

Grande Fratello 8 is the eighth season of the Italian version of the reality show franchise Big Brother. The show was produced by Endemol and aired from 21 January 2008 to 21 April 2008.

== Housemates ==
Housemates	Age	Birthplace	Occupation	Day entered	Day exited	Status
Mario Ferretti	30	Orvieto	Bricklayer	1	92	Winner
Teresa Stinziani	26	Termoli	Tax consultant	1	92	Runner-up
Christine Del Rio	28	Bedford, UK	Veejay	1	92	3rd Place
Silvia Burgio	29	Gallarate	Make-up artist	1	92	4th Place
Francesco Botta	25	Rome	Furniture representative	1	86	16th Evicted
Carmela "Lina" Carcuro	26	Naples	Medic	1	86	15th Evicted
Mirko Sozio	27	Isernia	Student	38	78	Ejected
Gian Filippo Failla	26	Casablanca, Morocco	Student	1	78	14th Evicted
Roberto Mercandalli	26	Milan	Business owner	1	71	13th Evicted
Fabio Orlando	22	Messina	Waiter; Orlando family's member	1	64	12th Evicted
Raffaella Fico	19	Cercola	Model	1	64	11th Evicted
Thiago Barcelos	26	Santa Maria, Brazil	Bartender; Benedetta Zilli's husband	1	57	10th Evicted
Benedetta Zilli	32	Nereto	Pizzeria manager; Thiago Barcelos' wife	15	50	9th Evicted
Alice Caligiuri	28	Rome	Boxer	1	43	8th Evicted
Andrea Bellumore	28	Fermo	Studente	1	38	7th Evicted
Nadia Castaldi	27	Caserta	Travel agent	1	38	6th Evicted
Carmela Mazzeo	55	Furnari	Housewife; Orlando family's member	1	29	5th Evicted
Giuseppe Orlando	34	Milazzo	Physiotherapist; Orlando family's member	1	22	4th Evicted
Filippo Orlando	61	Novara di Sicilia	Retired; Orlando family's member	1	15	3rd Evicted
Alì Ayash	27	Beirut, Lebanon	Engineer	1	15	2nd Evicted
Domenico Orlando	27	Milazzo	Photographer; Orlando family's member	1	8	1st Evicted

== Nominations table ==
	Week 1	Week 2		Week 3	Week 4	Week 5		Week 6	Week 7	Week 8	Week 9		Week 10	Week 11	Week 12		Week 13	
	Week 1	Day 8	Day 15	Week 3	Week 4	Day 29	Day 38	Week 6	Week 7	Week 8	Day 57	Day 64	Week 10	Week 11	Day 78	Day 86	Week 13	
Best of the week	None	Carmela, Filippo, Mario	None	Lina, Teresa	Thiago	Benedetta	None	Raffaella	Mirko	Roberto	Christine	None	Lina	Mario	None			
Mario	No; Nominations	Exempt	Filippo	Christine	Carmela, Lina	Andrea, Lina	Andrea	Christine, Lina	Christine, Lina	Gian, Fabio	Roberto, Silvia	6th Saved; Teresa to save	Christine, Roberto	Exempt	Christine, Lina	Christine, Francesco	Winner (Day 92)	
Teresa	No; Nominations	Alice, Lina	Filippo	Exempt	Carmela, Lina	Alice, Lina	Andrea	Alice, Lina	Lina, Raffaella	Fabio, Gian	Gian, Raffaella	7th Saved; Silvia to save	Gian, Roberto	Gian, Lina	Gian, Lina	Gian, Francesco	Runner up (Day 92)	
Christine	No; Nominations	Giuseppe, Nadia	Fillipo	Giuseppe	Carmela, Fabio	Mario, Thiago	Thiago	Roberto, Silvia	Benedetta, Gian	Gian, Thiago	Exempt	2nd Saved; Lina to save	Mario, Silvia	Mirko, Christine	Mario, Teresa	Mario, Teresa	Third place (Day 92)	
Silvia	No; Nominations	Ali, Raffaella	Giuseppe	Andrea	Andrea, Lina	Andrea, Lina	Andrea	Lina, Roberto	Lina, Roberto	Fabio, Gian	Gian, Roberto	8th Saved	Gian, Roberto	Christine, Francesco	Mario, Teresa	Francesco, Teresa	Fourth place (Day 92)	
Francesco	No; Nominations	Ali, Lina	Filippo	Raffaela	Gian, Lina	Fabio, Lina	Thiago	Gian, Lina	Benedetta, Roberto	Fabio, Gian	Raffaella, Roberto	1st Saved; Christine to save	Gian, Roberto	Gian, Silvia	Gian, Teresa	Gian, Teresa	Evicted (Day 86)	
Lina	No; Nominations	Fabio, Giuseppe	Giuseppe	Exempt	Carmela, Fabio	Mario, Nadia	Thiago	Francesco, Silvia	Benedetta, Gian	Gian, Thiago	Fabio, Mario	3rd Saved; Roberto to save	Exempt	Francesco, Mirko	Mario, Teresa	Evicted (Day 86)		
Mirko	Not In; House							Exempt		Gian, Thiago	Gian, Roberto	nominated	Gian, Roberto	Christine, Gian	Ejected (Day 78)			
Gian-Filippo	No; Nominations	Fabio, Giuseppe	Filippo	Nadia	Carmela, Fabio	Nadia, Silvia	Andrea	Christine, Teresa	Christine, Francesco	Fabio, Francesco	Fabio, Silvia	5th Saved; Mario to save	Silvia, Teresa	Silvia, Teresa	Evicted (Day 78)			
Roberto	No; Nominations	Nadia, Silvia	Giuseppe	Andrea	Carmela, Fabio	Nadia, Silvia	Andrea	Fabio, Silvia	Christine, Fabio	Exempt	Francesco, Teresa	4th Saved; Gian-Filippo to save	Francesco, Silvia	Evicted (Day 71)				
Fabio	No; Nominations	Ali, Alice	Filippo	Alice	Alice, Gian	Alice, Lina	Andrea	Alice, Gian	Christine, Francesco	Francesco, Gian	Lina, Roberto	nominated	Evicted (Day 64)					
Raffaella	No; Nominations	Fabio, Giuseppe	Giuseppe, Filippo	Giuseppe	Carmela, Nadia	Nadia, Silvia	Andrea	Exempt	Fabio, Mario	Fabio, Francesco	Francesco, Teresa	Evicted (Day 64)						
Thiago	No; Nominations	Ali, Christine	Giuseppe	Christine	Exempt	Christine, Lina	nominated	Alice, Christine	Lina, Christine	Francesco, Gian	Evicted (Day 57)							
Benedetta	Not In; House			Exempt	Alice, Carmela	Exempt	Andrea	Alice, Christine	Christine, Lina	Evicted (Day 50)								
Alice	No; Nominations	Fabio, Teresa	Filippo	Fabio	Carmela, Fabio	Fabio, Teresa	Thiago	Fabio, Teresa	Evicted (Day 43)									
Andrea	No; Nominations	Christine, Fabio	Filippo	Christine	Gian, Roberto	Christine, Roberto	nominated	Evicted (Day 38)										
Nadia	No; Nominations	Christine, Raffaella	Giuseppe	Raffaela	Carmela, Gian	Christine, Lina	Evicted (Day 38)											
Carmela	No; Nominations	Exempt	Filippo	Alice	Alice, Gian	Evicted (Day 29)												
Giuseppe	No; Nominations	Alice, Lina	nominated	Christine	Evicted (Day 22)													
Filippo	No; Nominations	Exempt	nominated	Evicted (Day 15)														
Ali	No; Nominations	Fabio, Giuseppe	Evicted (Day 15)															
Domenico	No; Nominations	Evicted (Day 8)																
Notes	^{1}	^{2}	^{3}	^{4}	^{5}	^{6}	^{7}	^{8}	^{9}	^{10}	^{11}	^{12}	^{13}	^{14}	-	-	^{15}	
nominated For Eviction	Domenico, Fabio, Silvia	Ali, Fabio, Silvia	Filippo, Silvia	Alice, Andrea, Christine, Giuseppe, Silvia	Carmela, Fabio, Silvia	Christine, Lina, Nadia, Silvia	Andrea, Silvia	Alice, Christine, Silvia	Benedetta, Christine, Silvia	Fabio, Francesco, Silvia, Thiago	Fabio, Francesco, Gian, Raffaella, Roberto, Silvia	Fabio, Silvia	Christine, Francesco, Gian, Mario, Roberto, Silvia, Teresa	Gian, Silvia	Lina, Mario, Silvia, Teresa	Francesco, Silvia	Christine, Mario, Silvia, Teresa	
Ejected	none													Mirko	none			
Evicted	Domenico; 43% to evict	Ali; 60% to evict	Filippo; 9!of!14!votes to evict	Giuseppe; 49% to evict	Carmela; 79% to evict	Nadia; 33% to evict	Andrea; 8!of!12!votes to evict	Alice; 45% to evict	Benedetta; 57% to evict	Thiago; 45% to evict	Raffaella; 40% to evict	Fabio; 56% to evict	Roberto; 63% to evict	Gian; 63% to evict	Lina; 50% to evict	Francesco; 57% to evict	Gian; 7% to win	Christine; 8% to win
Evicted	Domenico; 43% to evict	Ali; 60% to evict	Filippo; 9!of!14!votes to evict	Giuseppe; 49% to evict	Carmela; 79% to evict	Nadia; 33% to evict	Andrea; 8!of!12!votes to evict	Alice; 45% to evict	Benedetta; 57% to evict	Thiago; 45% to evict	Raffaella; 40% to evict	Fabio; 56% to evict	Roberto; 63% to evict	Gian; 63% to evict	Lina; 50% to evict	Francesco; 57% to evict	Teresa; 37% to win	Mario; 63% to win

=== Notes ===
- ^1 This year's Grando Fratello contained the largest family ever to compete in Big Brother; Carmela & Filippo are married, and Domenico, Fabio & Giuseppe are their sons. Because of this, the producers felt that they held an advantage in nominations, and the three brothers (Domenico, Fabio and Giuseppe) were automatically nominated for the first eviction.
- ^2 The producers decided to give immunity to Carmela, Filippo and Mario this week. They could not nominate or be nominated.
- ^3 After Ali's eviction, a round of nomination was held. Only Raffaele was allowed to nominate, and chose to nominate Filippo and Giuseppe. These two then faced the vote of the rest of their housemates, and Filippo was evicted 9–5.
- ^4 Housemates only nominated one person each this week. The producers decided that Lina and Teresa should be immune from nominating and being nominated. Shortly after the nominations Benedetta, Thiago's wife, entered as a new housemate.
- ^5 The producers decided that Thiago should be Immune from nominating and being nominated.
- ^6 The producers decided that Benedetta should be immune from nominating and being nominated.
- ^7 Andrea & Thiago were chosen by the producers to face their housemates' vote that night.
- ^8 Mirko is exempt as a new housemate, as is Raffaella - the producers' choice.
- ^9 Mirko is, again, exempt as he is still new to the house.
- ^10 All-female housemates were made immune from being nominated by the producers this week. They could, however, nominate the male housemates. Male housemate Roberto was also made Immune by the producers - he could not nominate or be nominated.
- ^11 The producers decided that Christine should be immune from nominating and being nominated.
- ^12 The producers decided to award immunity to Francesco. Francesco then had to start a chain of immunity by choosing another housemate to be immune. That housemate then chose another to be immune and this continued until 2 housemates remained. Fabio and Mirko will face the public vote, for the eviction that night, after they were not awarded immunity.
- ^13 Lina was chosen for exemption, and the four or more housemates with the most nominations will face the public vote this week, not the usual three.
- ^14 Mario was chosen for exemption, and only the two housemates with the most nominations will face the public vote this week.
- ^15 All remaining housemates automatically face the public vote to win this week.

== TV Ratings ==
=== Live shows ===
The live shows aired every Monday on Canale 5.

Episode	Date	Viewers	Share
1	21 January 2008	5,616,000	27.72%
2	28 January 2008	5,001,000	23.61%
3	4 February 2008	4,854,000	21.59%
4	11 February 2008	5,128,000	22.57%
5	18 February 2008	5,235,000	23.21%
6	27 February 2008	5,188,000	23.57%
7	3 March 2008	5,379,000	23.85%
8	10 March 2008	5,077,000	23.18%
9	17 March 2008	5,107,000	23.94%
10	24 March 2008	5,309,000	26.71%
11	31 March 2008	6,183,000	28.07%
12	7 April 2008	6,578,000	29.68%
Semifinale	15 April 2008	5,766,000	26.10%
Finale	21 April 2008	6,258,000	28.80%
Average		5,477,000	25.19%
Our adventure	28 April 2008	4,975,000	20.24%

=== Daily ===
The daily shows aired on Canale 5. In addition to the normal daily shows aired at 6.15 pm, a new nightly show named "Grande Fratello night" was aired on Saturday night.

	Week 1	Week 2	Week 3	Week 4	Week 5	Week 6	Week 7	Week 8	Week 9	Week 10	Week 11	Week 12	Week 13
Tuesday	2.334m 17.25%	1.705m 13.20%	1.872m 13.91%	2.226m 16.85%	1.966m 15.23%	1.921m 14.42%	1.620m 16.44%	1.753m 17.86%	1.634m 19.02%	1.910m 15.74%	1.855m 20.12%	1.889m 16.11%	1.792m 15.65%
Wednesday	2.132m 14.62%	1.779m 12.96%	1.806m 13.53%	1.975m 15.24%	2.108m 15.57%	1.789m 13.65%	1.839m 17.37%	1.705m 19.34%	1.445m 17.22%	1.730m 14.63%	1.695m 17.11%	1.584m 14.63%	?m ?%
Thursday	1.925m 13.80%	1.964m 14.34%	1.958m 14.47%	1.937m 14.43%	2.059m 15.39%	1.936m 15.07%	1.699m 16.60%	1.405m 18.07%	1.566m 19.18%	1.502m 13.11%	1.541m 15.24%	1.659m 15.33%	1.775m 15.90%
Friday	2.099m 15.72%	1.868m 15.16%	1.826m 13.85%	1.953m 15.01%	1.940m 15.49%	1.762m 13.94%	1.931m 19.03%	1.534m 19.18%	1.614m 16.81%	1.562m 14.26%	1.723m 17.07%	1.689m 15.46%	1.807m 16.81%
Saturday	2.526m 19.10%	2.366m 16.95%	2.342m 17.84%	2.714m 18.79%	2.462m 18.95%	2.178m 16.71%	2.206m 17.77%	2.237m 19.14%	2.118m 17.01%	2.027m 19.24%	1.978m 20.00%	1.993m 19.06%	1.773m 17.56%
Grande Fratello night	1.588m 14.34%	1.535m 12.77%	1.505m 16.06%	1.113m 9.82%	1.081m 10.69%	0.665m 6.26%	1.590m 20.14%	1.809m 21.40%	1.374m 16.34%	1.513m 17.46%	1.552m 17.54%	1.203m 13.96%	1.416m 18.85%
Monday	1.896m 14.42%	1.973m 13.44%	2.053m 14.74%	2.173m 15.99%	1.866m 14.55%	1.659m 18.17%	1.914m 18.36%	1.610m 19.54%	1.850m 13.53%	1.731m 17.33%	1.506m 15.62%	1.768m 13.70%	1.660m 15.02%
Weekly average	2.071m 15.60%	1.898m 14.11%	1.908m 14.91%	2.013m 15.16%	1.926m 15.12%	1.701m 14.03%	1.928m 17.95%	1.721m 19.21%	1.664m 17.10%	1.735m 16.03%	1.707m 17.64%	1.683m 15.46%	?m ?%
Season average	1.809m 16.05%												
