= Grande Fratello season 4 =

Grande Fratello
- Season 4
- Presented by: Barbara D'Urso
- No. of days: 106
- No. of housemates: 15
- Winner: Serena Garitta
- Runner-up: Patrick Ray Pugliese

Release
- Original network: Canale 5
- Original release: 22 January – 6 May 2004

Season chronology
- ← Previous; Season 3 Next → Season 5

Grande Fratello 4 is the fourth season of the Italian version of the reality show franchise Big Brother. The show was produced by Endemol and was broadcast from 22 January 2004 to 6 May 2004.

== Housemates ==
Housemates	Age	Birthplace	Occupation	Day entered	Day exited	Status
Serena Garitta	25	Genoa	Fitness instructor	1	106	Winner
Patrick Ray Pugliese	26	Tehran, Iran	Student	1	106	Runner-up
Katia Pedrotti	25	Sondrio	Agent	1	106	3rd Place
Tommaso Vianello	30	Venice	Disc jockey	1	99	12th Evicted
Carolina Marconi	25	Caracas, Venezuela	Manager	1	92	11th Evicted
Ascanio Pacelli	30	Rome	Golfer	1	85	10th Evicted
Bruno Del Turco	40	Ancona	Peddler	1	78	9th Evicted
Robert Minicozzi	25	Adelaide, Australia	Mechanic	1	64	8th Evicted
Ilaria Turi	19	Taranto	Student; Domenico Turi's daughter	1	50	7th Evicted
Domenico Turi	44	Taranto	Business owner; Ilaria Turi's father	1	43	6th Evicted
Erika Braidich	28	Spoleto	Tour operator	1	36	5th Evicted
Letizia Lezza	29	Pisa	Hairdresser	1	29	4th Evicted
Romina Ersini	33	Buenos Aires, Argentina	Telecommunications agent	8	22	3rd Evicted
Renato Celli	28	Rimini	Student	1	8	2nd Evicted
Carmen Meja	24	Santo Domingo, Dominican Republic	Cubist	1	1	1st Evicted

== Future Appearances ==
In 2012, Patrick Ray Pugliese competed in Grande Fratello 12. He had a late entry into the game but managed to reach the finale, finishing in 3rd Place.

In 2020, Patrick once again returned to compete in Grande Fratello VIP 4 and was able to reach the finale for a third time, finishing in 4th Place.

In 2022, Carolina Marconi returned to compete in Grande Fratello VIP 7.

== Nominations table ==
	Week 1		Week 3	Week 4	Week 5	Week 6	Week 7	Week 9	Week 11	Week 12	Week 13	Week 14	Week 15 Final		Nominations received
	Day 1	Day 8	Week 3	Week 4	Week 5	Week 6	Week 7	Week 9	Week 11	Week 12	Week 13	Week 14	Week 15 Final		Nominations received
Serena	Carmen	Housemate	Letizia, Tommaso	Letizia, Patrick	Ascanio, Patrick	Bruno, Domenico, Robert	Ascanio, Tommaso	Ascanio, Robert, Tommaso	Bruno, Tommaso	Ascanio, Tommaso	Patrick, Tommaso	Patrick, Tommaso	Winner (Day 106)		25
Patrick	Carolina	Housemate	Domenico, Ilaria	Domenico, Ilaria	Domenico, Serena	Carolina, Ilaria, Katia	Bruno, Robert	Ascanio, Carolina, Robert	Carolina, Serena	Ascanio, Tommaso	Carolina, Serena	Serena, Tommaso	Runner-up (Day 106)		16
Katia	Carolina	Housemate	Domenico, Romina	Carolina, Ilaria	Carolina, Domenico	Carolina, Domenico, Ilaria	Ilaria, Robert	Ascanio, Robert, Tommaso	Bruno, Tommaso	Serena, Tommaso	Carolina, Tommaso	Serena, Tommaso	Third place (Day 106)		12
Tommaso	Carmen	Housemate	Patrick, Romina	Ilaria, Serena	Ilaria, Erika	Carolina, Domenico, Ilaria	Ilaria, Serena	Katia, Patrick, Serena	Katia, Serena	Patrick, Serena	Katia, Serena	Katia, Serena	Evicted (Day 99)		20
Carolina	Nominated	Housemate	Erika, Letizia	Erika, Letizia	Erika, Ascanio	Ascanio, Bruno, Domenico	Ascanio, Tommaso	Ascanio, Robert, Tommaso	Ascanio, Bruno	Ascanio, Patrick	Katia, Patrick	Evicted (Day 92)			25
Ascanio	Not in House	Non- Housemate	Patrick, Romina	Ilaria, Serena	Carolina, Ilaria	Carolina, Domenico, Ilaria	Carolina, Serena	Carolina, Patrick, Serena	Carolina, Patrick	Patrick, Serena	Evicted (Day 85)				16
Bruno	Carmen	Housemate	Patrick, Romina	Ilaria, Serena	Domenico, Ilaria	Carolina, Domenico, Ilaria	Carolina, Ilaria	Carolina, Katia, Serena	Carolina, Serena	Evicted (Day 78)					6
Robert	Carmen	Housemate	Patrick, Romina	Carolina, Ilaria	Carolina, Ilaria	Ilaria, Katia, Serena	Katia, Serena	Carolina, Katia, Serena	Evicted (Day 64)						7
Ilaria	Carmen	Housemate	Erika, Letizia	Erika, Letizia	Ascanio, Tommaso	Ascanio, Katia, Tommaso	Ascanio, Tommaso	Evicted (Day 50)							24
Domenico	Carmen	Housemate	Patrick, Romina	Erika, Letizia	Erika, Serena	Carolina, Katia, Serena	Evicted (Day 43)								14
Erika	Carmen	Housemate	Carolina, Tommaso	Carolina, Ilaria	Domenico, Ilaria	Evicted (Day 36)									9
Letizia	Carolina	Housemate	Domenico, Romina	Carolina, Ilaria	Evicted (Day 29)										7
Romina	Not in House		Erika, Ilaria	Evicted (Day 22)											7
Renato	Not in House	Non- Housemate	Evicted (Day 8)												N/A
Carmen	Nominated	Evicted (Day 1)													N/A
Nomination note	1	2	none	3	4	5	none		6	7	8	none	9		
Nominated for eviction	Carolina, Carmen	Ascanio, Renato	Patrick, Romina	Ilaria, Letizia	Ascanio, Carolina, Domenico, Erika	Carolina, Domenico, Ilaria	Ascanio, Ilaria, Serena, Tommaso	Ascanio, Robert, Serena	Bruno, Carolina	Ascanio, Patrick, Serena	Carolina, Patrick, Serena, Tommaso	Serena, Tommaso	Katia, Patrick, Serena		
Evicted	Carmen; 7 of 10 votes to evict	Renato; 69% to evict	Romina; 83% to evict	Letizia; 68% to evict	Erika; 39% to evict	Domenico; 48% to evict	Ilaria; 49% to evict	Robert; 48% to evict	Bruno; 54% to evict	Ascanio; 75% to evict	Carolina; 48% to evict	Tommaso; 68% to evict	Katia; 5% to win	Patrick; 32% to win	
Evicted	Carmen; 7 of 10 votes to evict	Renato; 69% to evict	Romina; 83% to evict	Letizia; 68% to evict	Erika; 39% to evict	Domenico; 48% to evict	Ilaria; 49% to evict	Robert; 48% to evict	Bruno; 54% to evict	Ascanio; 75% to evict	Carolina; 48% to evict	Tommaso; 68% to evict	Serena; 63% to win		
Survived	Carolina; 3 of 10 votes	Ascanio; 31%	Patrick; 17%	Ilaria; 32%		Carolina; 42% Ilaria; 10%	Ascanio; 38% Serena; 8% Tommaso; 5%	Ascanio; 47% Serena; 5%	Carolina; 46%			Serena; 32%	Serena; 63% to win		

=== Notes ===
- ^Note 1: On day one, Carmen and Carolina were nominated by Big Brother. Their fellow housemates voted and Carmen was evicted.
- ^Note 2: On day one, Ascanio and Renato entered the house and the public had to vote for one of them to evict.
- ^Note 3: Carolina won the weekly task and chose herself to be immune from nomination.
- ^Note 4: Domenico won the weekly task and chose Ilaria to be immune from nomination.
- ^Note 5: Carolina won the weekly task and chose herself to be immune from nomination.
- ^Note 6: Serena won the weekly task and chose herself to be immune from nomination.
- ^Note 7: Ascanio won the weekly task and chose Tommaso to be immune from nomination.
- ^Note 8: Katia won the weekly task and chose herself to be immune from nomination.
- ^Note 9: For the final week, the public was voting for a winner, rather than to evict.

== TV Ratings ==
Episode	Date	Viewers	Share
1	22 January 2004	9,349,000	38,62%
2	29 January 2004	7,862,000	30,13%
3	6 February 2004	7,277,000	28,61%
4	12 February 2004	6,773,000	24,80%
5	19 February 2004	8,227,000	32,56%
6	26 February 2004	8,564,000	33,41%
7	4 March 2004	8,301,000	32,00%
8	11 March 2004	8,143,000	33,34%
9	18 March 2004	8,243,000	33,81%
10	25 March 2004	8,396,000	32,03%
11	1 April 2004	8,928,000	34,58%
12	8 April 2004	7,698,000	32,41%
13	15 April 2004	8,978,000	35,36%
14	22 April 2004	8,654,000	38,18%
Semifinal	29 April 2004	8,544,000	37,04%
Final	6 May 2004	11,159,000	45,38%
Average		8,443,000	33,89%
