= Grande Fratello season 14 =

Grande Fratello
- Season 14
- Presented by: Alessia Marcuzzi
- No. of days: 78
- No. of housemates: 19
- Winner: Federica Lepanto
- Runner-up: Domenico Manfredi

Release
- Original network: Canale 5
- Original release: 24 September – 10 December 2015

Season chronology
- ← Previous; Season 13 Next → Season 15

Grande Fratello 14 was the fourteenth season of the Italian version of the reality show franchise Big Brother. The show premieres on 24 September 2015 and concluded on 10 December 2015. For the last time, Alessia Marcuzzi returned as the main host of the show. This also had a twist, which was housemates were divided in pairs.

Federica Lepanto emerged as the winner on Day 78.

== Housemates ==
Housemates	Age	Birthplace	Occupation	Partner(s)	Day entered	Day exited	Status
Federica Lepanto	22	Salerno	Student	Alessandro	1	78	Winner
Domenico Manfredi	27	Bari	Athletic trainer	Igor & Valentina	1	78	Runner-up
Simone Nicastri	25	Verbania	Student	Rebecca	1	78	3rd Place
Alessandro Calabrese	32	Velletri	Entrepreneur	Federica	1	78	4th Place
Kevin Ishebabi	23	Padua	Student and model	Mary	1	78	5th Place
Jessica Vella	23	Catania	Waitress	Lidia	1	71	13th Evicted
Livio Parisi	32	Naples	Office worker	none	50	71	12th Evicted
Rebecca De Pasquale	36	Eboli	Maid and dog sitter	Simone	1	71	11th Evicted
Diego Ianniello	29	Rome	Personal trainer	Verdiana	29	57	10th Evicted
Luigi Tuccillo	38	Naples	Writer	Peppe	1	57	9th Evicted
Valentina Bonariva	26	Lecco	Ballerina and model	Igor & Manfredi	8	57	8th Evicted
Barbara Donadio	27	Viareggio	Model and hostess	Rossella	1	50	7th Evicted
Rossella Intellicato	30	Turin	Businesswoman	Barbara	1	43	6th Evicted
Verdiana Fanzone	27	Caltagirone	Manager	Giovanni & Diego	1	36	5th Evicted
Lidia Vella	23	Catania	Waitress	Jessica	1	36	4th Evicted
Maria "Mary" Falconieri	23	Nardò	Student	Kevin	1	29	3rd Evicted
Igor Di Giovanni	26	Kyiv, Ukraine	Entrepreneur	Manfredi & Valentina	1	22	2nd Evicted
Giovanni Angiolini	34	Sassari	Orthopedist	Verdiana	1	22	Walked
Giuseppe "Peppe" Tuccillo	41	Naples	Photographer	Luigi	1	15	1st Evicted

=== Guests ===
This edition is characterized by the frequent presence of guests, who usually stay in the house for a week each. During their stay, the housemates have the task of discovering the various secrets of the guests.

If the housemates fail to discover the secret, they must serve punishments or the Grand prize amount is lowered.

Name	Duration	Secret/Mission	Result
Arianna & Marco	Day 8-15	Secret: They both underwent a sex change and were married	
Rocco Siffredi	Day 29-31, 36	Mission: Draw up a ranking of the sexiest people in the house.	
Anna & Yuri	Day 36-43	Secret: Anna and Yuri pretend to be engaged, instead they are mother and son.	
Livio	Day 43-50	Secret: Livio has to pretend his name is Francesco and that he has never met any housemate of the House, but in reality he is Barbara's ex-boyfriend.	
Luca & Giulia	Day 50-57	Secret: Luca has to pretend to be Riccardo and be engaged to Giulia, but in reality he is Valentina's boyfriend.	
Marco	Day 57-64	Secret: Marco has to pretend his name is Nicola and has never met any housemate of the House, but in reality he is Simone's stepbrother.	
Desirèe Popper	Day 64-71	Mission: Desirèe must pretend to be very interested in Livio and conquer him with the complicity of all the other males of the House.	

== Nominations table ==
Nominations were similar to Gran Hermano 15 (Spain). Each pair nominated two other pairs with 2 and 1 points.

	Week 2	Week 3	Week 4	Week 5		Week 6		Week 7		Week 8		Week 9		Week 10			Week 11 Final	
	Week 2	Week 3	Week 4	Day 29	Day 36	Day 36	Day 43	Day 43	Day 50	Day 50	Day 57	Day 57	Day 64	Day 64	Day 71	Day 71	Week 11 Final	
Federica	Exempt	Luigi, Igor, Manfredi & Valentina	Rebecca & Simone, Kevin & Mary	Manfredi & Valentina, Veridiana	Jessica to save	Luigi, Kevin	Luigi to evict	Rebecca & Simone, Kevin	Jessica to save	Valentina, Kevin	Jessica to save	Kevin, Manfredi	Nominated	Finalist			Winner (Day 78)	
Manfredi	Giovanni & Veridiana, Kevin & Mary	Luigi, Alessandro & Federica	Alessandro & Federica, Rebecca & Simone	Alessandro & Federica, Jessica & Lidia	Kevin to save	Alessandro & Federica, Jessica	Simone	Rebecca & Simone, Jessica	Alessandro & Federica to save	Federica, Jessica	Kevin to save	Federica, Jessica	Not eligible	Jessica, Livio	Finalist		Runner-Up (Day 78)	
Simone	Luigi & Peppe, Igor & Manfredi	Igor, Manfredi & Valentina, Alessando & Federica	Alessandro & Federica, Barbara & Rossella	Jessica & Lidia, Alessandro & Federica	Luigi to save	Barbara & Rossella, Alessandro & Federica	Luigi	Barbara, Manfredi & Valentina	Manfredi & Valentina to save	Manfredi, Valentina	Rebecca to save	Alessandro, Livio	Finalist				Third Place (Day 78)	
Alessandro	Exempt	Luigi, Igor, Manfredi & Valentina	Rebecca & Simone, Kevin & Mary	Manfredi & Valentina, Veridiana	Jessica to save	Luigi, Kevin	Diego	Rebecca & Simone, Kevin	Jessica to save	Federica, Simone	Manfredi to save	Kevin, Simone	Federica	Kevin, Livio	Jessica to save	Finalist	Fourth Place (Day 78)	
Kevin	Luigi & Peppe, Igor & Manfredi	Luigi, Barbara & Rossella	Barbara & Rossella, Luigi	Jessica & Lidia, Luigi	Rebecca & Simone to save	Barbara & Rossella, Luigi	Luigi	Barbara, Diego	Not eligible	Manfredi, Federica	Simone to save	Livio, Alessandro	Livio	Rebecca, Alessandro	Jessica to save	Nominated	Fifth Place (Day 78)	
Jessica	Kevin & Mary, Giovanni & Veridiana	Kevin & Mary, Giovanni & Verdiana	Kevin & Mary, Rebecca & Simone	Manfredi & Valentina, Rebecca & Simone	Barbara & Rossella to save	Rebecca & Simone, Luigi	Simone to evict	Rebecca & Simone, Diego	Kevin to save	Rebecca, Simone	Alessandro to save	Simone, Manfredi	Rebecca	Manfredi, Rebecca	Alessandro to save	Nominated	Evicted (Day 71)	
Livio	Not in House						Guest		Exempt		Nominated	Simone, Manfredi	Nominated	Kevin, Manfredi	Alessandro to save	Evicted (Day 71)		
Rebecca	Luigi & Peppe, Igor & Manfredi	Igor, Manfredi & Valentina, Alessando & Federica	Alessandro & Federica, Barbara & Rossella	Jessica & Lidia, Alessandro & Federica	Luigi to save	Barbara & Rossella, Alessandro & Federica	Luigi to evict	Barbara, Manfredi & Valentina	Manfredi & Valentina to save	Kevin, Jessica	Not eligible	Kevin, Jessica	Nominated	Kevin, Jessica	Rebecca to save	Evicted (Day 71)		
Diego	Not in House		In; Garage	Exempt	Nominated	Luigi, Alessandro & Federica	Luigi	Rebecca & Simone, Kevin	Not eligible	In; Garage	Federica to save	Evicted (Day 57)						
Luigi	Giovanni & Veridiana, Kevin & Mary	Rebecca & Simone, Igor, Manfredi & Valentina	Rebecca & Simone, Kevin & Mary	Alessandro & Federica, Jessica & Lidia	Not eligible	Barbara & Rossella, Alessandro & Federica	Simone	In; Garage			Evicted (Day 57)							
Valentina	Exempt	Luigi, Alessandro & Federica	Alessandro & Federica, Rebecca & Simone	Alessandro & Federica, Jessica & Lidia	Kevin to save	Alessandro & Federica, Jessica	Luigi to evict	Rebecca & Simone, Jessica	Alessandro & Federica to save	Federica, Jessica	Evicted (Day 57)							
Barbara	Kevin & Mary, Rebecca & Simone	Kevin & Mary, Rebecca & Simone	Kevin & Mary, Rebecca & Simone	Rebecca & Simone, Luigi	Manfredi & Valentina to save	Luigi, Rebecca & Simone	Simone to evict	Rebecca & Simone, Diego	Evicted (Day 50)									
Rossella	Kevin & Mary, Rebecca & Simone	Kevin & Mary, Rebecca & Simone	Kevin & Mary, Rebecca & Simone	Rebecca & Simone, Luigi	Manfredi & Valentina to save	Luigi, Rebecca & Simone	Evicted (Day 43)											
Veridiana	Luigi & Peppe, Igor & Manfredi	Luigi, Igor, Manfredi & Valentina	Exempt	Luigi, Alessandro & Federica	Nominated	Evicted (Day 36)												
Lidia	Kevin & Mary, Giovanni & Veridiana	Kevin & Mary, Giovanni & Verdiana	Kevin & Mary, Rebecca & Simone	Manfredi & Valentina, Rebecca & Simone	Evicted (Day 36)													
Mary	Luigi & Peppe, Igor & Manfredi	Luigi, Barbara & Rossella	Barbara & Rossella, Luigi	Evicted (Day 29)														
Igor	Giovanni & Veridiana, Kevin & Mary	Luigi, Alessandro & Federica	Evicted (Day 22)															
Giovanni	Luigi & Peppe, Igor & Manfredi	Luigi, Igor, Manfredi & Valentina	Walked (Day 22)															
Peppe	Giovanni & Veridiana, Kevin & Mary	Evicted (Day 15)																
Notes	1, 2, 3	4	5, 6														7	
Walked	none	Giovanni	none															
Nominated	Kevin; Peppe	Igor; Luigi	Alessandro; Mary; Simone	Federica; Lidia	Diego; Veridiana	Federica; Luigi; Rossella	Luigi; Simone	Barbara; Diego; Simone	Diego; Kevin	Federica; Jessica; Kevin; Manfredi; Valentina	Diego; Livio	Alessandro; Kevin; Livio; Manfredi; Simone	Federica; Livio; Rebecca	Jessica; Kevin; Manfredi; Rebecca	Jessica; Rebecca	Jessica; Kevin	Alessandro, Federica, Kevin, Manfredi, Simone	
Nominated	Kevin; Peppe	Igor; Luigi	Alessandro; Mary; Simone	Federica; Lidia	Diego; Veridiana	Federica; Luigi; Rossella	Luigi; Simone	Barbara; Diego; Simone	Diego; Kevin	Diego; Luigi	Diego; Livio	Alessandro; Kevin; Livio; Manfredi; Simone	Federica; Livio; Rebecca	Jessica; Kevin; Manfredi; Rebecca	Kevin; Livio	Jessica; Kevin	Alessandro, Federica, Kevin, Manfredi, Simone	
Evicted	Peppe; 73.49% to evict	Igor; 53.35% to evict	Mary; 54.01% to evict	Lidia; 75.21% to evict	Veridiana; Couple's choice to evict	Rossella; 72.76% to evict	Luigi; 3 of 5 votes to fake evict	Barbara; 60.92% to evict	Diego; 0 of 7 votes to save	Valentina; 58.25% to evict	Diego; 55.96% to evict	Simone; 46.98% to be finalist	Federica; 88.81% to be finalist	Manfredi; 42.24% to be finalist	Rebecca; 16.65% to be finalist	Jessica; 31.38% to be finalist	Kevin; 3.85% (out of 5)	Alessandro; 5.18% (out of 5)
Evicted	Peppe; 73.49% to evict	Igor; 53.35% to evict	Mary; 54.01% to evict	Lidia; 75.21% to evict	Veridiana; Couple's choice to evict	Rossella; 72.76% to evict	Luigi; 3 of 5 votes to fake evict	Barbara; 60.92% to evict	Diego; 0 of 7 votes to save	Luigi; 54.14% to evict	Diego; 55.96% to evict	Simone; 46.98% to be finalist	Federica; 88.81% to be finalist	Manfredi; 42.24% to be finalist	Livio; 24.81% to be finalist	Jessica; 31.38% to be finalist	Simone; 15.50% (out of 3)	Manfredi; 26.06% (out of 2)
Survived	Kevin; 26.51%	Luigi; 46.65%	Simone; 29.11% Alessandro; 16.88%	Federica; 24.79%	Diego	Luigi; 21.10% Federica; 6.14%	Simone (2 of 5 votes)	Diego; 32.93% Simone; 6.15%	Kevin	Federica; 15.00% Manfredi; 11.03% Kevin; 8.78% Jessica; 6.94%	Livio; 44.04%	Manfredi; 29.18% Alessandro; 15.57% Livio; 4.15% Kevin; 4.12%	Rebecca; 6.92% Livio; 4.22%	Kevin; 37.92% Jessica; 15.69% Rebecca; 4.15%	Jessica; 83.35% to be finalist	Kevin; 68.62% to be finalist	Federica; 73.94% to win	
Survived	Kevin; 26.51%	Luigi; 46.65%	Simone; 29.11% Alessandro; 16.88%	Federica; 24.79%	Diego	Luigi; 21.10% Federica; 6.14%	Simone (2 of 5 votes)	Diego; 32.93% Simone; 6.15%	Kevin	Diego; 45.86%	Livio; 44.04%	Manfredi; 29.18% Alessandro; 15.57% Livio; 4.15% Kevin; 4.12%	Rebecca; 6.92% Livio; 4.22%	Kevin; 37.92% Jessica; 15.69% Rebecca; 4.15%	Kevin; 75.19% to be finalist	Kevin; 68.62% to be finalist	Federica; 73.94% to win	

=== Notes ===
- ^Note 1: Alessandro & Federica were immune and exempt to nominate as they had just entered the Main House. Valentina was immune and exempt to nominate as a new housemate.
- ^Note 2: After nominations, each nominated pair had to choose which member would be nominated. Luigi & Peppe chose Peppe and Kevin & Mary chose Kevin.
- ^Note 3: Arianna & Marco were never full housemates. They had a mission in which the housemates couldn't discover they were a couple. As they did, they left the house with €30,000.
- ^Note 4: After nominations, each nominated pair had to choose which member would be nominated. Luigi didn't have to choose as he didn't have a partner and Igor, Manfredi & Valentina chose Igor.
- ^Note 5: Veridiana was immune since her partner walked from the house.
- ^Note 6: After nominations, each nominated pair had to choose which member would be nominated. Rebecca & Simone chose Simone, Kevin & Mary chose Mary and Alessandro & Federica chose Alessandro.
- ^Note 7: At the final round, the public voted for the winner.
