= Grande Fratello season 6 =

Grande Fratello
- Season 6
- Presented by: Alessia Marcuzzi
- No. of days: 99
- No. of housemates: 19
- Winner: Augusto De Megni
- Runner-up: Filippo Bisciglia

Release
- Original network: Canale 5
- Original release: 19 January – 27 April 2006

Season chronology
- ← Previous; Season 5 Next → Season 7

Grande Fratello 6 is the sixth season of the Italian version of the reality show franchise Big Brother. The show was produced by Endemol and it was aired from 19 January 2006 to 27 April 2006.

Alessia Marcuzzi as the main host of the show for the first time.

Augusto De Megni was the winner after receiving 38 percent of the vote.

== Housemates ==
Housemates	Age	Birthplace	Occupation	Day entered	Day exited	Status
Augusto De Megni	25	Perugia	Student and soccer player	1	99	Winner
Filippo Bisciglia	28	Rome	Trader	1	99	Runner-up
Fabiano Reffe	25	Frosinone	Bodyguard	1	99	3rd Place
Simone "Simon" Falsaperla	26	Rome	Model and student	1	92	16th Evicted
Laura Torrisi	26	Catania	Model	1	92	15th Evicted
Simona Salvemini	29	Milan	Trader	1	85	14th Evicted
Eleonora Ranzani	20	Turin	Shop assistant; Patrizia Sangregorio's daughter	29	78	13th Evicted
Man Lo Zhang	25	Chongqing, China	Student	1	71	12th Evicted
Rosario Rannisi	26	Catania	Student	15	64	11th Evicted
Patrizia Sangregorio	39	Turin	Marriage counselor; Eleonora Ranzani's mother	29	57	10th Evicted
Franco Alvisi	28	Bologna	Writer	1	50	9th Evicted
Isabella "Isa" Iaquinta	25	Crotone	Model and disc jockey	15	43	8th Evicted
Pier Renato Esposito	33	Cassino	Medic	8	36	7th Evicted
Leila Ben Khalifa	23	Tunis, Tunisia	Student	8	29	6th Evicted
Elena Canevazzi	28	Modena	Student	1	22	5th Evicted
Lucio Calligarich	29	Vizzolo Predabissi	Student	1	16	Walked
Thomas Cuni	26	Cesena	Employee	15	15	4th Evicted
Francesca Cipriani	21	Popoli	Speaker	1	15	3rd Evicted
Giovanna Rigato	24	Vittorio Veneto	Fresh graduate	1	8	2nd Evicted
Danilo Martino Dettori	24	Sassari	Bartender	1	1	1st Evicted

== Nominations table ==
Housemate is on the Poor team or Team 1
Housemate is on the Rich team or Team 2

	Week 1	Week 2	Week 3	Week 4	Week 5	Week 6	Week 7	Week 8		Week 9	Week 10	Week 11	Week 12	Week 13	Week 14 Final	
	Week 1	Week 2	Week 3	Week 4	Week 5	Week 6	Week 7	Day 50	Day 57	Week 9	Week 10	Week 11	Week 12	Week 13	Week 14 Final	
Augusto	No nominations	Francesca, Laura	Franco, Leila	Isa, Leila	Rosario, Simon	Isa, Patrizia	Franco, Patrizia	Laura, Simon	Fabiano	Fabiano, Simon	Fabiano, Laura, Simon	Fabiano, Laura	Laura, Simon	Laura, Simon	Winner (Day 99)	
Filippo	No nominations	Franco, Laura	Franco, Leila	Isa, Rosario	Augusto, P. Renato	Eleonora, Fabiano	Eleonora, Patrizia	Eleonora, Rosario	Rosario	Eleonora, Rosario	Eleonora, Laura, Man-Lò	Eleonora, Laura	Laura, Simon	Laura, Simon	Runner-up (Day 99)	
Filippo	No nominations	Franco, Laura	Franco, Leila	Isa, Rosario	Augusto, P. Renato	Eleonora, Fabiano	Eleonora, Patrizia	Eleonora, Rosario	Augusto	Eleonora, Rosario	Eleonora, Laura, Man-Lò	Eleonora, Laura	Laura, Simon	Laura, Simon	Runner-up (Day 99)	
Fabiano	No nominations	Augusto, Simona	Elena, P. Renato	Man-Lò, P. Renato	P. Renato, Rosario	Eleonora, Filippo	Patrizia, Simona	Eleonora, Patrizia	Augusto	Augusto, Rosario	Augusto, Eleonora, Man-Lò	Augusto, Eleonora	Augusto, Laura	Augusto, Filippo	Third Place (Day 99)	
Simon	No nominations	Francesca, Franco	Elena, P. Renato	Man-Lò, P. Renato	Franco, P. Renato	Eleonora, Simona	Franco, Patrizia	Augusto, Rosario	Augusto	Augusto, Man-Lò	Augusto, Man-Lò, Simona	Augusto, Simona	Augusto, Simona	Augusto, Filippo	Evicted (Day 92)	
Laura	No nominations	Augusto, Filippo	Lucio, P. Renato	P.Renato, Simon	Augusto, P. Renato	Eleonora, Filippo	Eleonora, Patrizia	Rosario, Patrizia	Augusto	Augusto, Rosario	Augusto, Eleonora, Man-Lò	Augusto, Eleonora	Filippo, Simona	Augusto, Filippo	Evicted (Day 92)	
Simona	No nominations	Francesca, Franco	Franco, Leila	Leila, Rosario	Franco, P. Renato	Eleonora, Simon	Franco, Patrizia	Rosario, Patrizia	Rosario	Eleonora, Rosario	Eleonora, Laura, Man-Lò	Eleonora, Simon	Laura, Simon	Evicted (Day 85)		
Simona	No nominations	Francesca, Franco	Franco, Leila	Leila, Rosario	Franco, P. Renato	Eleonora, Simon	Franco, Patrizia	Rosario, Patrizia	Fabiano	Eleonora, Rosario	Eleonora, Laura, Man-Lò	Eleonora, Simon	Laura, Simon	Evicted (Day 85)		
Eleonora	Not in house				Exempt	Fabiano, Filippo	Franco, Rosario	Fabiano, Filippo	Fabiano	Fabiano, Filippo	Filippo, Laura, Simona	Fabiano, Filippo	Evicted (Day 78)			
Man-Lò	No nominations	Augusto, Simona	Lucio, P. Renato	Fabiano, P. Renato	Augusto, Simon	Isa, Patrizia	Eleonora, Patrizia	Eleonora, Patrizia	Simon	Eleonora, Simon	Laura, Simon, Simona	Evicted (Day 71)				
Man-Lò	No nominations	Augusto, Simona	Lucio, P. Renato	Fabiano, P. Renato	Augusto, Simon	Isa, Patrizia	Eleonora, Patrizia	Eleonora, Patrizia	Fabiano	Eleonora, Simon	Laura, Simon, Simona	Evicted (Day 71)				
Rosario	Not in house		Exempt	Leila, Simona	P. Renato, Simon	Isa, Man-Lò	Laura, Simona	Patrizia, Simon	Fabiano	Fabiano, Simon	Evicted (Day 64)					
Patrizia	Not in house				Exempt	Augusto, Isa	Laura, Simona	Fabiano, Rosario	Evicted (Day 57)							
Franco	No nominations	Filippo, Simon	Leila, Simona	Leila, Simona	P. Renato, Simon	Augusto, Isa	Augusto, Simona	Evicted (Day 50)								
Isa	Not in house		Exempt	Augusto, Rosario	P. Renato, Simon	Augusto, Franco	Evicted (Day 43)									
P. Renato	Not in house	Exempt	Elena, Simon	Laura, Simon	Fabiano, Simon	Evicted (Day 36)										
Leila	Not in house	Exempt	Augusto, Simona	Augusto, Simona	Evicted (Day 29)											
Elena	Nominated	Augusto, Franco	Fabiano, P. Renato	Evicted (Day 22)												
Lucio	No nominations	Augusto, Francesca	Elena, P. Renato	Walked (Day 16)												
Francesca	No nominations	Augusto, Simon	Evicted (Day 15)													
Giovanna	Nominated	Evicted (Day 8)														
Danilo	Evicted (Day 1)															
Notes																
Nominated	Augusto, Danilo	Augusto, Francesca, Franco	Elena, Franco, Leila, P. Renato	Leila, Man-Lò, Rosario, Simon, Simona	P. Renato, Simon	Eleonora, Isa	Franco, Patrizia	Patrizia, Rosario	Augusto, Eleonora, Fabiano, Filippo, Laura, Man-Lò, Rosario, Simon, Simona	Augusto, Eleonora, Fabiano, Rosario, Simon	Eleonora, Laura, Man-Lò	Augusto, Eleonora	Laura, Simon, Simona	Augusto, Laura, Simon	Augusto, Fabiano, Filippo	
Nominated	Elena, Giovanna	Augusto, Francesca, Franco	Elena, Franco, Leila, P. Renato	Leila, Man-Lò, Rosario, Simon, Simona	P. Renato, Simon	Eleonora, Isa	Franco, Patrizia	Patrizia, Rosario	Augusto, Fabiano	Augusto, Eleonora, Fabiano, Rosario, Simon	Eleonora, Laura, Man-Lò	Augusto, Eleonora	Laura, Simon, Simona	Augusto, Fabiano, Filippo, Simon	Augusto, Fabiano, Filippo	
Walked	none		Lucio	none												
Evicted	Danilo; 46% to enter	Francesca; 47% to evict	Elena; 40% to evict	Leila; 36% to evict	P. Renato; 79% to evict	Isa; 75% to evict	Franco; 59% to evict	Patrizia; 56% to evict	Fabiano; 5 of 9 votes to fake evict	Rosario; 33% to evict	Man-Lò; 45% to evict	Eleonora; 73% to evict	Simona; 51% to evict	Laura; 50% to evict	Fabiano; 28% (out of 3)	Filippo; 35% (out of 3)
Evicted	Giovanna; 79% to evict	Francesca; 47% to evict	Elena; 40% to evict	Leila; 36% to evict	P. Renato; 79% to evict	Isa; 75% to evict	Franco; 59% to evict	Patrizia; 56% to evict	Fabiano; 5 of 9 votes to fake evict	Rosario; 33% to evict	Man-Lò; 45% to evict	Eleonora; 73% to evict	Simona; 51% to evict	Simon; 37% to evict	Augusto; 38% to win	

== TV Ratings ==
Episode	Date	Viewers	Share
1	19 January 2006	7,633,000	36,76%
2	26 January 2006	7,495,000	33,99%
3	2 February 2006	6,730,000	31,72%
4	9 February 2006	6,816,000	32,36%
5	16 February 2006	6,203,000	29,27%
6	23 February 2006	5,598,000	27,05%
7	2 March 2006	5,340,000	28,44%
8	9 March 2006	5,912,000	28,96%
9	16 March 2006	6,402,000	31,00%
10	23 March 2006	6,153,000	30,38%
11	30 March 2006	6,504,000	31,52%
12	6 April 2006	6,104,000	33,51%
13	13 April 2006	6,181,000	31,05%
Semifinal	20 April 2006	6,485,000	31,35%
Final	27 April 2006	7,463,000	37,80%
Average		6,494,000	31,68%
La nostra avventura	4 May 2006	4,702,000	23,15%
