= Grande Fratello season 5 =

Grande Fratello
- Season 5
- Presented by: Barbara D'Urso
- No. of days: 71
- No. of housemates: 17
- Winner: Jonathan Kashanian
- Runner-up: Catrina Davies

Release
- Original network: Canale 5
- Original release: 23 September – 2 December 2004

Season chronology
- ← Previous; Season 4 Next → Season 6

Grande Fratello 5 is the fifth season of the Italian version of the reality show franchise Big Brother. The show was produced by Endemol and aired from 23 September 2004 to 2 December 2004.

In this season of Grande Fratello there were many new twists added. One involved four of the housemates who were all in a relationship with a fellow housemate. The four housemates were Francesco and Giulia who were married and Alfio and Rosa who were also married.

== Housemates ==
Housemates	Age	Birthplace	Occupation	Day entered	Day exited	Status
Jonathan Kashanian	23	Ramat Gan, Israel	Stylist	1	71	Winner
Catrina Davies	23	Cardiff, Wales	Model	1	71	Runner-up
Alessandro "Alex" Capone	25	Lucca	Bricklayer	1	71	3rd Place
Annalisa Caputo	23	Grosseto	Student	47	64	13th Evicted
Antonio Leotta	31	Milan	Club manager	1	64	12th Evicted
Maria Elena "Mary" Segneri	22	Frosinone	Student	1	57	11th Evicted
Rosa "Rosy" Stagnitti	33	Taurianova	Trader; Alfio Dessì's wife	1	50	10th Evicted
Pierre François Alaimo	26	Rome	Producer and student	47	50	9th Evicted
Veronica Rega	26	Rome	Student	1	46	8th Evicted
Guido Genovesi	39	Cascina	Interior decorator	1	44	Ejected
Patrizia Griffini	39	Verbania	Hairdresser	1	43	7th Evicted
Cinzia Molena	25	Saronno	Photomodel	1	36	6th Evicted
Alfio Dessì	37	Taurianova	Trader; Rosa "Rosy" Stagnitti's husband	1	29	5th Evicted
Aldo Pucci	33	Sydney, Australia	Trader	1	15	4th Evicted
Giulia Ponsi	24	Viareggio	Student; Francesco Giusti's wife	1	15	3rd Evicted
Francesco Giusti	40	Prato	Trader; Giulia Ponsi's husband	1	8	2nd Evicted
Alessandra Micciché	27	Catania	Dancer	1	1	1st Evicted

== Nominations table ==
	Week 1		Week 2	Week 3	Week 4	Week 5	Week 6	Week 7		Week 8	Week 9	Week 10 Final		Nominations received
	Day 1	Day 8	Week 2	Week 3	Week 4	Week 5	Week 6	Day 46	Day 50	Week 8	Week 9	Week 10 Final		Nominations received
Jonathan	Alessandra	No; Nominations	Antonio, Catrina	Antonio, Maria	Alfio, Rosa	Antonio, Rosa	Antonio, Patrizia	Antonio, Maria	Antonio, Catrina, Maria	Catrina, Maria	Antonio, Annalisa	Winner (Day 71)		7
Catrina	Veronica	No; Nominations	Alfio, Giulia	Aldo, Antonio	Antonio, Rosa	Antonio, Rosa	Alex, Patrizia	Antonio, Jonathan	Alex, Maria, Rosa	Antonio, Maria	Alex, Antonio	Runner-up (Day 71)		24
Alex	Alessandra	No; Nominations	Giulia, Veronica	Alfio, Rosa	Alfio, Rosa	Patrizia, Rosa	Patrizia, Veronica	Catrina, Veronica	Antonio, Catrina, Rosa	Catrina, Maria	Catrina, Annalisa	Third place (Day 71)		11
Annalisa	Not in House									Exempt	Alex, Antonio	Evicted (Day 64)		2
Antonio	Alessandra	No; Nominations	Giulia, Veronica	Aldo, Alfio	Catrina, Guido	Cinzia, Guido	Guido, Patrizia	Catrina, Veronica	Catrina, Jonathan, Rosa	Catrina, Maria	Catrina, Jonathan	Evicted (Day 64)		34
Maria	Alessandra	No; Nominations	Alfio, Giulia	Alfio, Antonio	Alfio, Antonio	Catrina, Rosa	Guido, Patrizia	Catrina, Jonathan	Alex, Catrina, Jonathan	Alex, Catrina	Evicted (Day 57)			11
Pierre François	Not in House									Evicted (Day 50)				N/A
Rosa	Alessandra	Nominated	Giulia, Verónica	Aldo, Antonio	Catrina, Jonathan	Antonio, Catrina	Alex, Patrizia	Alex, Catrina	Alex, Antonio, Catrina	Evicted (Day 50)				17
Veronica	Nominated	No; Nominations	Alfio, Giulia	Aldo, Antonio	Alfio, Antonio	Alex, Antonio	Alex, Patrizia	Antonio, Catrina	Evicted (Day 46)					10
Guido	Veronica	No; Nominations	Antonio, Patrizia	Alfio, Rosa	Alfio, Rosa	Antonio, Rosa	Maria, Veronica	Maria, Veronica	Ejected (Day 44)					4
Patrizia	Alessandra	No; Nominations	Alfio, Giulia	Alfio, Rosa	Alfio, Antonio	Antonio, Rosa	Antonio, Patrizia	Evicted (Day 43)						10
Cinzia	Alessandra	No; Nominations	Alfio, Giulia	Aldo, Antonio	Alfio, Antonio	Antonio, Catrina	Evicted (Day 36)							1
Alfio	Veronica	No; Nominations	Aldo, Maria	Antonio, Veronica	Catrina, Jonathan	Evicted (Day 29)								18
Aldo	Veronica	No; Nominations	Antonio, Giulia	Alfio, Rosa	Evicted (Day 22)									6
Giulia	Veronica	No; Nominations	Catrina, Veronica	Evicted (Day 15)										8
Francesco	Veronica	Nominated	Evicted (Day 8)											N/A
Alessandra	Nominated	Evicted (Day 1)												N/A
Notes	1	2	3	none					4, 5	none		6		
Nominated	Alessandra, Veronica	Francesco, Rosa	Alfio, Giulia, Veronica	Aldo, Alfio, Antonio, Rosa	Alfio, Antonio, Rosa	Alex, Antonio, Cinzia, Guido, Patrizia, Rosa	Alex, Antonio, Guido, Patrizia, Veronica	Antonio, Catrina, Jonathan, Veronica	Alex, Antonio, Catrina, Rosa	Antonio, Catrina, Maria	Alex, Annalisa, Antonio, Catrina	Alex, Catrina, Jonathan		
Nominated	Alessandra, Veronica	Francesco, Rosa	Alfio, Giulia, Veronica	Aldo, Alfio, Antonio, Rosa	Alfio, Antonio, Rosa	Alex, Antonio, Cinzia, Guido, Patrizia, Rosa	Alex, Antonio, Guido, Patrizia, Veronica	Antonio, Catrina, Jonathan, Veronica	Annalisa; Pierre	Antonio, Catrina, Maria	Alex, Annalisa, Antonio, Catrina	Alex, Catrina, Jonathan		
Ejected	none							Guido	none					
Evicted	Alessandra; 7 of 13 votes to evict	Francesco; 78% to evict	Giulia; 54% to evict	Aldo; 39% to evict	Alfio; 48% to evict	Cinzia; 36% to evict	Patrizia; 45% to evict	Veronica; 41% to evict	Rosa; 34% to evict	Maria; 52% to evict	Antonio; 43% to evict	Alex; 29% to win	Catrina; 33% to win	
Evicted	Alessandra; 7 of 13 votes to evict	Francesco; 78% to evict	Giulia; 54% to evict	Aldo; 39% to evict	Alfio; 48% to evict	Cinzia; 36% to evict	Patrizia; 45% to evict	Veronica; 41% to evict	Pierre; Grande Fratello's choice to evict	Maria; 52% to evict	Annalisa; 32% to evict	Alex; 29% to win	Catrina; 33% to win	
Survived	Veronica; 6 of 13 votes	Rosa; 22%	Veronica; 26% Alfio; 20%	Alfio; 33% Antonio; 16% Rosa; 12%	Antonio & Rosa; 52%	Patrizia; 19% Guido; 16% Rosa; 13% Antonio; 9% Alex; 7%	Veronica; 21% Guido; 12% Alex; 11% Antonio; 11%	Antonio; 25% Catrina; 24% Jonathan; 10%	Catrina; 31% Alex; 19% Antonio; 16%	Catrina; 29% Antonio; 19%	Alex ??? Catrina ???	Jonathan; 38% to win		
Survived	Veronica; 6 of 13 votes	Rosa; 22%	Veronica; 26% Alfio; 20%	Alfio; 33% Antonio; 16% Rosa; 12%	Antonio & Rosa; 52%	Patrizia; 19% Guido; 16% Rosa; 13% Antonio; 9% Alex; 7%	Veronica; 21% Guido; 12% Alex; 11% Antonio; 11%	Antonio; 25% Catrina; 24% Jonathan; 10%	Annalisa	Catrina; 29% Antonio; 19%	Alex ??? Catrina ???	Jonathan; 38% to win		

=== Notes ===
Housemate saved from eviction by the best of the weekly challenge.

- ^Note 1: On Day 1, Big Brother nominated Alessandra and Veronica for eviction. In a twist, the other Housemates had to evict one of them, as opposed to one of them being evicted by a public vote.
- ^Note 2: There were no nominations Week 1. Instead, Big Brother chose to automatically put Francesco and Rosa up for eviction.
- ^Note 3: Due to Rosa surviving the eviction in Week 1, she earned herself immunity during Week 2's nomination process.
- ^Note 4: Housemates were forced to nominate three Housemates this week.
- ^Note 5: Annalisa and Pierre entered the House on Day 47 with the stipulation that one of them would have to leave the House on Day 50. This was dependent on if a male or female left the House through Week 7's second public vote. If a female were to be evicted, Pierre would be evicted as well. If a male were to be evicted, Annalisa would then be evicted. Because Rosa was evicted on Day 50, Pierre was evicted immediately after her.
- ^Note 6: This week the public voted to win, rather than to evict.

== Ratings ==
Episode	Date	Viewers	Share
1	23 September 2004	6,886,000	34,13%
2	30 September 2004	6,108,000	28,26%
3	7 October 2004	6,384,000	29,69%
4	14 October 2004	6,350,000	29,08%
5	21 October 2004	6,940,000	29,82%
6	28 October 2004	6,847,000	29,27%
7	4 November 2004	6,823,000	29,43%
8	11 November 2004	6,686,000	28,57%
9	18 November 2004	6,523,000	27,97%
Semifinal	25 November 2004	7,264,000	31,39%
Final	2 December 2004	8,642,000	40,04%
Average		6,859,000	30,70%
La nostra avventura	9 December 2004	5,307,000	23,88%

== Sources ==
- World of Big Brother
