= Perla Vatiero =

Influencer, Italian model

Perla Vatiero (born December 28, 1997, Angri), is an Italian television personality and influencer, best known for her participation in the program Temptation Island in 2023.

== Biography ==
Perla was born in Angri, a municipality in the province of Salerno, Italy, where her parents, Rosa Tedesco and Alessandro Vatiero, also originate from. She graduated from the Giustino Fortunato Technical Commercial Institute (I.T.C.) in Angri, after which she attended the Faculty of Sports science at university, subsequently completing her studies.

Perla has stated that her dream has been to work in the fashion industry, as he declared several times to the press.

=== Entry in the world of entertainment ===
In 2023, Perla took part in the reality show Temptation Island together with her then-boyfriend Mirko Brunetti.

During the seventeenth edition of Grande Fratello, she decided to participate alongside her boyfriend but COVID-19 temporarily prevented their participation. She split up with her ex-boyfriend Mirko only to be reunited in the Grande Fratello house at the end of the season. The couple was nicknamed Perletti by their fans. The two separated permanently after the end of the television show. Perla was a finalist in the seventeenth Italian edition of Grande Fratello, and went on to win it.

=== Model for other brands, sponsors and social influencers ===
In 2022 she participated in the beauty contest Miss Italia Umbria, coming in fifth place, after being selected in the third stage at castle of Montignano in the city of Massa Martana.

She founded her own exclusive clothing brand, titled Perlystas, becoming both its advertising spokesperson and its administrator.

Collaborated with the clothing brand Shein, modelling their fall collection in September 2024.

== Personal life ==
At the age of 7, she lost her twin sister.

She told the press that he had used drugs.

She practiced karate and achieved a black belt but is also an expert in boxing.

Perla has explored self-care. In 2022 she opened her personal e-commerce and declared herself a supporter of sustainable fashion.

She was engaged to Mirko Brunetti, with whom she lived for several years and also participated in an edition of Templation Island and Grande Fratello.

After the end of her relationship with Mirko Brunetti, she declared on her Instagram account that she would not get engaged again. Her fans also noticed a difference in her cheekbones, which she said was due to weight loss.

Perla is active on social media, such as Instagram, Facebook and TikTok, on which is followed by approximately 203,000 users. On her Instagram profile, which promotes her fashion career, immediately attracted a huge number of fans; there were around 21,000 after her television success. She currently has Instagram profile has around 600,000 followers.

She also has a TikTok account, followed by approximately 203,000 users.

On April 21, 2024, she declared on her Instagram account that she had lost a dear aunt, to whom she was very close, news also reported by Italian newspapers.

In August 2024, she told the press that she had undertaken psychotherapy, shortly after breaking up with her boyfriend Mirko Brunetti.

In June 2025, she told her Instagram followers that she had begun writing a book about her life.

In August 2025, a romantic video between Perla and entrepreneur Cady Gueye appeared on Tik Tok, but there were no further details on the continuation of their relationship.

== Judicial matters ==
On July 6, 2025, with the announcement of her first memoir, she received a warning (in the Italian legal system), formal notice from her ex-boyfriend Mirko Brunetti.

== See also ==
- Alfonso Signorini
- Allegation
- Black belt
- Boxing
- COVID-19
- E-commerce
- Faculty (division)
- Fan (person)
- Friending and following
- Grande Fratello
- Judiciary of Italy
- Influencer
- Instagram
- Massa Martana
- Mediaset
- Psychotherapy
- Shein
- Sports science
- Sustainable fashion
- Television in Italy
- Temptation Island (TV series)
- TikTok
