= Paolo Galimberti =

Italian politician and businessman

Paolo Galimberti (Giussano, 7 July 1968) is an Italian politician and entrepreneur.

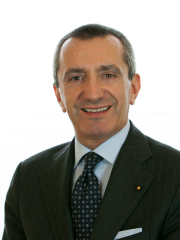

== Life ==
Galimberti is a member of Euronics. In 2013, he was elected senator in Italy. He is openly gay and was engaged to Alfonso Signorini.

== See also ==
- The People of Freedom
- Euronics
