= Grande Fratello season 13 =

Grande Fratello
- Season 13
- Presented by: Alessia Marcuzzi
- No. of days: 85
- No. of housemates: 17
- Winner: Mirco Petrilli
- Runner-up: Francesca "Chicca" Rocco

Release
- Original network: Canale 5
- Original release: 3 March – 26 May 2014

Season chronology
- ← Previous; Season 12 Next → Season 14

Grande Fratello 13 was the thirteenth season of the Italian version of the reality show franchise Big Brother. The show premieres on 3 March 2014 and concluded on 26 May 2014. Alessia Marcuzzi returned as the main host of the show.

Veronica Graf was one of four international Big Brother alumni up for a public vote to compete in the fourth season of Big Brother Canada but was not selected to enter the house.

== Housemates ==
Housemates	Age	Birthplace
Mirco Petrilli	28	Velletri
Francesca "Chicca" Rocco	29	Legnano
Modestina Cicero	25	Mannheim, Germany
Samba Laobe Ndiaye	33	Senegal
Giovanni Masiero	28	Verona
Angela Viviani	28	Sesto San Giovanni
Roberto Ruberti	32	Rome
Fabio Pellegrini	25	Rome
Diletta Di Tanno	24	Turin
Mia Cellini	22	Rome
Valentina Acciardi	33	Turin
Armando and Giuseppe Armenise	36-32	Bari
Andrea Cerioli	24	San Lazzaro di Savena
Greta Maisto	26	Erice
Francesca Cioffi	27	Naples
Veronica Graf	24	Faenza
Michele Simoncini	30	Senigallia

== Nominations table ==
	Week 2	Week 3	Week 4	Week 5	Week 6		Week 7		Week 8	Week 9		Week 10		Week 11		Week 12		Final		Nominations received
Mirco	Giovanni	Francesca; Mia	Andrea; Angela	Andrea; Fabio	Samba to save	A.&G. Diletta	A.&G.	Valentina; Diletta	Fabio; Diletta	Diletta	Fabio	Modestina to be finalist	Giovanni	Angela	Angela	Nominated	Finalist	Winner (Day 85)		4
Chicca	Valentina	Greta; Angela	Greta; Angela	Greta; Valentina	Saved	Andrea; Valentina	Valentina	Valentina; Fabio	Mia; Fabio	Fabio	Fabio	Giovanni to be finalist	Roberto	Angela	Angela	Finalist		Runner-Up (Day 85)		35
Modestina	Chicca	Francesca; Mia	Francesca; Andrea	Diletta; Greta	Giovanni to save	Diletta; Giovanni	Diletta	Diletta; Roberto	Fabio; Angela	Fabio	Angela	Mirco to be finalist	Angela	Angela	Finalist			Third Place (Day 85)		25
Samba	Michele	Mia; Francesca	Andrea; Francesca	Mia; Andrea	A.&G. to save	Andrea; Angela	Valentina	Valentina; Mia	Mia; Fabio	Diletta	Fabio	Samba to be finalist	Modestina	Modestina	Angela	Nominated	Nominated	Fourth Place (Day 85)		4
Giovanni	Mirco	Veronica; Roberto	A.&G. Andrea	Modestina; Andrea	Chicca to save	Andrea; Diletta	Valentina	Valentina; Fabio	Mia; Fabio	Diletta	Fabio	Samba to be finalist	Roberto	Finalist				Fifth Place (Day 85)		17
Angela	Modestina	Chicca; Veronica	Chicca; Modestina	Chicca; Modestina	Valentina to save	Chicca; Modestina	A.&G.	Chicca; Modestina	Chicca; Modestina	Giovanni	Modestina	Roberto to be finalist	Chicca	Chicca	Chicca	Nominated	Nominated	Evicted (Day 85)		15
Roberto	Michele	Francesca; Mia	Francesca; A.&G.	Mia; Giovanni	Andrea to save	A.&G. Giovanni	A.&G.	Modestina; Mia	Modestina; Chicca	Chicca	Chicca	Angela to be finalist	Chicca	Evicted (Day 71)						5
Fabio	Exempt	Veronica; Francesca	Chicca; A.&G.	Chicca; A.&G.	Not; Eligible	Not; Eligible	Nominated	Chicca; Modestina	Chicca; Modestina	Chicca	Chicca	Evicted (Day 64)								16
Diletta	A.&G.	Chicca; Veronica	A.&G. Modestina	A.&G. Modestina	Roberto to save	A.&G. Modestina	A.&G.	Samba; Giovanni	Mirco; Modestina	Mirco	Evicted (Day 57)									11
Mia	Modestina	Angela; Greta	Modestina; Giovanni	Giovanni; Fabio	Mirco to save	A.&G. Samba	A.&G.	Samba; Giovanni	Giovanni; Chicca	Evicted (Day 57)										13
Valentina	Chicca	Chicca; Giovanni	Chicca; Giovanni	Chicca; Giovanni	Diletta to save	Giovanni; Chicca	A.&G.	Samba; Chicca	Giovanni; Chicca	Evicted (Day 50)										12
Armando & Giuseppe	Mia	Chicca; Francesca	Andrea; Valentina	Greta; Andrea	Modestina to save	Andrea; Roberto	Valentina	Evicted (Day 43)												19
Andrea	Michele	Mia; Francesca	Francesca; Modestina	Chicca; A.&G.	Mia to save	Chicca; Giovanni	Evicted (Day 43)													14
Greta	Modestina	Chicca; Veronica	Chicca; Modestina	Chicca; A.&G.	Angela to save	Evicted (Day 36)														8
Francesca	Modestina	Greta; Fabio	Modestina; Andrea	Evicted (Day 29)																11
Veronica	Exempt	Greta; Angela	Evicted (Day 22)																	5
Michele	Mirco	Evicted (Day 15)																		3
Notes	^{1}, ^{2}	None			^{3}		^{4}	None	^{5}	^{6}	None	^{7}	None	^{8}, ^{9}	^{10}	^{11}	^{12}	^{13}		
Nominated	Michele; Modestina	Chicca; Francesca; Mia; Veronica	Andrea; A.&G. Chicca; Francesca; Modestina	Andrea; A.&G. Chicca; Giovanni; Greta; Modestina	Andrea; A.&G. Giovanni		A.&G. Fabio	Chicca; Modestina; Samba; Valentina	Chicca; Fabio; Mia; Modestina	Diletta; Fabio	Chicca; Fabio	Chicca; Roberto		Angela; Modestina	Angela; Chicca	Angela; Mirco; Samba	Angela; Samba	Chicca; Giovanni; Mirco; Modestina; Samba		
Evicted	Michele; 64.55% to evict	Veronica; 36.06% to evict	Francesca; 37.55% to evict	Greta; 37.54% to evict	Fabio; 0 of 12 votes to save	Andrea; 48.24% to evict	Armando & Giuseppe; 78.00% to evict	Valentina; 74.86% to evict	Mia; 69.91% to evict	Diletta; 53.71% to evict	Fabio; 65.91% to evict	Samba; 2 of 7 votes to be finalist	Roberto; 69.12% to evict	Modestina; 52.74% to be finalist	Chicca; 75.72% to be finalist	Mirco; 66.03% to be finalist	Angela; 49.88% to be finalist	Giovanni; 4.50% (out of 5)	Samba; 7.73% (out of 5)	
Evicted	Michele; 64.55% to evict	Veronica; 36.06% to evict	Francesca; 37.55% to evict	Greta; 37.54% to evict	Fabio; 0 of 12 votes to save	Andrea; 48.24% to evict	Armando & Giuseppe; 78.00% to evict	Valentina; 74.86% to evict	Mia; 69.91% to evict	Diletta; 53.71% to evict	Fabio; 65.91% to evict	Samba; 2 of 7 votes to be finalist	Roberto; 69.12% to evict	Modestina; 52.74% to be finalist	Chicca; 75.72% to be finalist	Mirco; 66.03% to be finalist	Angela; 49.88% to be finalist	Modestina; 11.33% (out of 3)	Chicca; 27.81% (out of 2)	
Survived	Modestina; 35.45%	Francesca; 35.07% Chicca; 20.95% Mia; 7.92%	Armando & Giuseppe; 21.94% Modestina; 19.30% Andrea; 11.70% Chicca; 9.51%	Armando & Giuseppe; 29.77% Andrea; 11.93% Modestina; 11.09% Chicca; 6.60% Giovanni; 3.06%	Armando & Giuseppe; 45.62% Giovanni; 6.14%		Fabio; 22.00%	Samba; 12.96% Chicca; 7.87% Modestina; 4.31%	Chicca; 25.30% Fabio; 3.15% Modestina; 1.63%	Fabio; 46.29%	Chicca; 34.09%	Angela; 1 of 7 votes Giovanni; 1 of 7 votes Mirco; 1 of 7 votes Modestina; 1 of 7 votes Roberto; 1 of 7 votes	Chicca; 30.88%	Angela; 47.26%	Angela; 24.28%	Angela; 20.02% Samba; 13.95%	Samba; 50.12%	Mirco; 72.19% to win		

=== Notes ===
- ^1 At February 22, four potential housemates (Diletta, Eithel, Lorenzo and Enzo) were presented to the public. Between these four, only one would win the status of an official housemate. One day before the launch, at March 2, Enzo was ejected from the competition after breaking some of the rules. Later during the launch, it was revealed that Eithel received the fewest votes, and was eliminated. Finally, Diletta was the most voted, with 65% of the votes, and entered as an official housemate.
- ^2 On round 1 male contestants nominated men, and female contestants nominated women but as Armando & Giuseppe lived first week with female contestants, they could nominate women. Fabio and Veronica entered as new housemates, so they were exempt of nominating and be nominated.
- ^3 On week 6, Greta, the evicted housemate had to save a housemate and she saved Angela and then she saved Valentina, she saved Diletta. Diletta saved Roberto and he saved Andrea then he saved Mia and then she saved Mirco. Mirco saved Samba who saved Armando & Giuseppe and they saved Modestina who saved Giovanni and he finally saved Chicca meaning Fabio was evicted but he will live at the cantina where next week people voted to save him or not.
- ^4 On week 7, Fabio was already nominated as he was not chosen by the housemates. Armando & Giuseppe were nominated and they faced eviction along Fabio.
- ^5 On week 8, after Valentina was evicted she was able to nominate.
- ^6 On week 9, there was a double eviction where the male housemate with most votes from females would face nomination with the female housemate with more votes from males. Diletta and Fabio received most votes from each gender and were nominated.
- ^7 On week 10, the housemates chose who they wanted to be the first finalist. Samba received 2 votes so he became the first finalist of the season and he is exempt from the rest of nominations.
- ^8 On week 11, Samba was asked if he wanted to keep his immunity or give it to another housemate. He chose to give it to Giovanni.
- ^9 On week 11, there was a tie between Chicca and Modestina. Angela, as she had more votes had to break it choosing Modestina. Since now, the public vote will be to vote for the finalist and not to evict.
- ^10 As Giovanni and Modestina were already finalists they were not eligible to nominate.
- ^11 Angela, Mirco and Samba were nominated and the one with most votes would become the fourth finalist.
- ^12 Angela and Samba were the last non-finalist housemates so they were nominated to be the last finalist.
- ^13 At the final round, the public voted for the winner.
