= Grande Fratello season 7 =

Grande Fratello
- Season 7
- Presented by: Alessia Marcuzzi
- No. of days: 92
- No. of housemates: 19
- Winner: Milo Coretti
- Runner-up: Alessandro Tersigni

Release
- Original network: Canale 5
- Original release: 18 January – 19 April 2007

Season chronology
- ← Previous; Season 6 Next → Season 8

Grande Fratello 7 is the seventh season of the Italian version of the reality show franchise Big Brother. The show was produced by Endemol and it was aired from 18 January 2007 to 19 April 2007.

The winner Milo Coretti won a €500,000 cash prize.

Italian singer-songwriter Tiziano Ferro and Italian model/actress Elisabetta Canalis appeared as special guests in the 19 April 2007 season finale episode, which was the highest-rated of the season.

== Contestants ==
| Housemates | Age | Birthplace | Occupation | Day entered | Day exited | Status |
|---|---|---|---|---|---|---|
| Milo Coretti | 29 | Rome | Business owner | 1 | 92 | Winner |
| Alessandro Tersigni | 27 | Rome | Fireman | 1 | 92 | Runner-up |
| Guendalina Canessa | 25 | Florence | Employee | 1 | 92 | 3rd Place |
| Andrea Spadoni | 29 | Lucca | Journalist | 8 | 92 | 4th Place |
| Francesca Paola Di Meo | 28 | Naples | Chauffeur | 1 | 85 | 15th Evicted |
| Massimo Brozzi | 29 | Rome | Engineer | 22 | 78 | 14th Evicted |
| Simona Mattioni | 31 | Ostia | Hostess | 8 | 71 | 13th Evicted |
| Sonia Gloria Roy | 33 | London, UK | English teacher | 22 | 64 | 12th Evicted |
| Melita Toniolo | 20 | San Biagio di Callalta | Model | 1 | 64 | 11th Evicted |
| Raniero Monaco di Lapio | 24 | London, UK | Bartender and agent | 1 | 57 | 10th Evicted |
| Mirela Kovacevic | 27 | Postojna, Slovenia | Freelance | 1 | 50 | 9th Evicted |
| Francesco Testi | 28 | Verona | Commercial administrator | 15 | 50 | 8th Evicted |
| Gabriele Petronio | 27 | Milan | Student | 1 | 43 | 7th Evicted |
| Alfredo Lo Bianco | 27 | Palermo | Ecological operator | 1 | 36 | 6th Evicted |
| Dominic Rubio Albarca | 30 | Barcelona, Spain | Hostess and dancer | 1 | 29 | 5th Evicted |
| Michele Morsuillo | 31 | Prato | Unemployed | 1 | 22 | 4th Evicted |
| Salvatore Troise | 29 | Naples | Banking | 1 | 15 | 3rd Evicted |
| Diana Kleymenova | 25 | Vinnytsia, Ukraine | Secretary | 1 | 15 | 2nd Evicted |
| Gabriella Malavasi | 28 | Bologna | Intern | 1 | 8 | 1st Evicted |

== Nominations table ==
| | Week 1 | Week 2 | | Week 3 | Week 4 | Week 5 | Week 6 | | Week 7 | | Week 8 | | Week 9 | | Week 10 | Week 11 | Week 12 | | Week 13 Final | |
| | Week 1 | Day 8 | Day 15 | Week 3 | Week 4 | Week 5 | Week 6 | | Day 43 | Day 50 | Day 50 | Day 57 | Day 57 | Day 64 | Week 10 | Week 11 | Day 78 | Day 85 | Week 13 Final | |
|---|---|---|---|---|---|---|---|---|---|---|---|---|---|---|---|---|---|---|---|---|
| Milo | No; Nominations | In; Dump | Exempt | Exempt | Simona; Francesco | Alfredo | Massimo | Raniero; Massimo | Mirela; Guendalina | Mirela | Massimo; Raniero | Massimo | Simona; Melita | Exempt | Simona; Francesca | Francesca; Guendalina | Francesca; Andrea | Alessandro | Winner (Day 92) | |
| Alessandro | No; Nominations | Melita; Michele | Alfredo | Alfredo; Melita | Exempt | Gabriele | Gabriele | Francesco; Raniero | Guendalina; Francesca | Mirela | Guendalina; Massimo | Massimo | Guendalina; Francesca | Exempt | Guendalina; Massimo | Guendalina; Massimo | Guendalina; Francesca | Guendalina | Runner-up (Day 92) | |
| Guendalina | No; Nominations | In; Dump | Exempt | Exempt | Francesco; Simona | Exempt | Massimo | Massimo; Francesco | Melita; Alessandro | Raniero | Massimo; Melita | Massimo | Milo; Alessandro | Sonia | Massimo; Alessandro | Massimo; Alessandro | Alessandro; Andrea | Alessandro | Third place (Day 92) | |
| Andrea | Not in house | | Exempt | Exempt | Francesca; Simona | Alessandro | Massimo | Massimo; Gabriele | Massimo; Simona | Mirela | Massimo; Simona | Massimo | Simona; Melita | Exempt | Simona; Massimo | Massimo; Guendalina | Alessandro; Guendalina | Alessandro | Fourth place (Day 92) | |
| Francesca | No; Nominations | In; Dump | Exempt | Exempt | Exempt | Exempt | Massimo | Alessandro; Raniero | Melita; Guendalina | Raniero | Massimo; Raniero | Massimo | Melita; Alessandro | Sonia | Massimo; Alessandro | Massimo; Alessandro | Alessandro; Milo | Evicted (Day 85) | | |
| Massimo | Not in house | | | | | Alfredo | Not; Eligible | Raniero; Alessandro | Francesca; Guendalina | Raniero | Francesca; Simona | Simona | In; Dump | Nominated | Andrea; Simona | Francesca; Guendalina | Evicted (Day 78) | | | |
| Simona | Not in house | | Exempt | Exempt | Gabriele; Francesco | Exempt | Exempt | Massimo; Gabriele | Massimo; Guendalina | Raniero | Massimo; Guendalina | Massimo | Milo; Andrea | Sonia | Massimo; Andrea | Evicted (Day 71) | | | | |
| Sonia | Not in house | | | | | Exempt | Gabriele; Massimo | Francesco; Gabriele | Francesca; Massimo | Mirela | Raniero; Guendalina | Massimo | Francesca; Guendalina | Francesca | Evicted (Day 64) | | | | | |
| Sonia | Not in house | | | | | Exempt | Massimo | Francesco; Gabriele | Francesca; Massimo | Mirela | Raniero; Guendalina | Massimo | Francesca; Guendalina | Francesca | Evicted (Day 64) | | | | | |
| Melita | No; Nominations | Diana; Salvatore | Salvatore | Alessandro; Michele | Exempt | Exempt | Gabriele | Gabriele; Milo | Francesco; Guendalina | Mirela | Guendalina; Massimo | Massimo | Milo; Guendalina | Evicted (Day 64) | | | | | | |
| Raniero | No; Nominations | Melita; Salvatore | Salvatore | Alfredo; Dominic | Exempt | Gabriele | Gabriele | Francesco; Milo | Guendalina; Francesco | Nominated | Guendalina; Francesco | Evicted (Day 57) | | | | | | | | |
| Mirela | No; Nominations | Salvatore; Melita | Salvatore | Alessandro; Alfredo | Exempt | Exempt | Gabriele | Milo; Gabriele | Francesco; Guendalina | Nominated | Evicted (Day 50) | | | | | | | | | |
| Francesco | Not in house | | | | Guendalina; Simona | Raniero | Massimo | Alessandro; Raniero | Mirela; Raniero | Mirela; Raniero | Evicted (Day 50) | | | | | | | | | |
| Gabriele | No; Nominations | In; Dump | Exempt | Exempt | Simona; Francesca | Alfredo | Not; Eligible | Alessandro; Raniero | Evicted (Day 43) | | | | | | | | | | | |
| Alfredo | No; Nominations | Alessandro; Raniero | Salvatore | Raniero; Diana | Exempt | Gabriele | Evicted (Day 36) | | | | | | | | | | | | | |
| Dominic | No; Nominations | Diana; Salvatore | Salvatore | Alessandro; Michele | Nominated | Evicted (Day 29) | | | | | | | | | | | | | | |
| Michele | Nominated | Diana; Salvatore | Salvatore | Alessandro; Alfredo | Evicted (Day 22) | | | | | | | | | | | | | | | |
| Salvatore | No; Nominations | Michele; Dominic | Michele | Evicted (Day 15) | | | | | | | | | | | | | | | | |
| Diana | No; Nominations | Michele; Melita | Evicted (Day 15) | | | | | | | | | | | | | | | | | |
| Gabriella | Nominated | Evicted (Day 8) | | | | | | | | | | | | | | | | | | |
| Nominated | Guendalina, Melita | Diana; Salvatore | Alessandro; Alfredo; Michele; Raniero; Salvatore | Alfredo; Michele | Dominic; Francesco | Alfredo; Gabriele; Raniero | Massimo | Alessandro; Francesco; Gabriele; Massimo | Francesco; Massimo | Mirela; Raniero | Guendalina; Massimo; Raniero | None | Guendalina; Melita | ~~Francesca~~, ~~Guendalina~~, ~~Simona~~, Sonia | Alessandro; Andrea; Massimo; Simona | Francesca; Massimo | Alessandro; Andrea; Francesca; Guendalina | Alessandro | Alessandro, Andrea, Guendalina, Milo | |
| Nominated | Gabriella; Michele | Diana; Salvatore | Alessandro; Alfredo; Michele; Raniero; Salvatore | Alfredo; Michele | Dominic; Francesco | Alfredo; Gabriele; Raniero | Massimo | Alessandro; Francesco; Gabriele; Massimo | Francesco; Massimo | Mirela; Raniero | Guendalina; Massimo; Raniero | None | Guendalina; Melita | Massimo; Sonia | Alessandro; Andrea; Massimo; Simona | Francesca; Massimo | Alessandro; Andrea; Francesca; Guendalina | Alessandro | Alessandro, Andrea, Guendalina, Milo | |
| Evicted | Guendalina; 3 of 4 votes to fake evict | Diana; 73% to evict | Salvatore; 6 of 8 votes to evict | Michele; 58% to evict | Dominic; 92% to evict | Alfredo; 37% to evict | Massimo ?% to save | Gabriele; 49% to evict | Francesco; 54% to evict | Mirela; 5 of 9 votes to evict | Raniero; 49% to evict | Massimo; 8 of 9 votes to fake evict | Melita; 73% to evict | Sonia; 57% to evict | Simona; 61% to evict | Massimo; 64% to evict | Francesca; 47% to evict | Alessandro; 3 of 4 votes to fake evict | Andrea; 14% (out of 4) | Guendalina; 27% (out of 3) |
| Evicted | Gabriella; 70% to evict | Diana; 73% to evict | Salvatore; 6 of 8 votes to evict | Michele; 58% to evict | Dominic; 92% to evict | Alfredo; 37% to evict | Massimo ?% to save | Gabriele; 49% to evict | Francesco; 54% to evict | Mirela; 5 of 9 votes to evict | Raniero; 49% to evict | Massimo; 8 of 9 votes to fake evict | Melita; 73% to evict | Sonia; 57% to evict | Simona; 61% to evict | Massimo; 64% to evict | Francesca; 47% to evict | Alessandro; 3 of 4 votes to fake evict | Alessandro; 49% to win | Milo; 51% to win |

== TV Ratings ==
| Episode | Date | Viewers | Share |
|---|---|---|---|
| 1 | 18 January 2007 | 6,481,000 | 30,82% |
| 2 | 25 January 2007 | 5,551,000 | 24,38% |
| 3 | 1 February 2007 | 5,559,000 | 25,47% |
| 4 | 8 February 2007 | 5,503,000 | 25,13% |
| 5 | 15 February 2007 | 5,574,000 | 25,85% |
| 6 | 22 February 2007 | 5,693,000 | 25,32% |
| 7 | 1 March 2007 | 4,501,000 | 19,50% |
| 8 | 8 March 2007 | 5,379,000 | 25,81% |
| 9 | 15 marzo 2007 | 5,372,000 | 25,04% |
| 10 | 22 March 2007 | 5,436,000 | 25,34% |
| 11 | 29 March 2007 | 5,693,000 | 25,31% |
| 12 | 5 April 2007 | 5,286,000 | 25,76% |
| Semifinal | 12 April 2007 | 5,771,000 | 26,37% |
| Final | 19 April 2007 | 5,951,000 | 31,13% |
| Average | | 5,553,000 | 25,80% |
| La nostra avventura | 26 April 2007 | 4,355,000 | 20,46% |
