= Grande Fratello =

Italian reality television series

- Created by: John de Mol Jr.
- Directed by: Fosco Gasperi (2000–2001); Fabio Calvi (2003–2004, 2006–2009); Sergio Colabona (2009–2012, 2014–2015); Alessio Pollacci (2018–2019, 2023–); Marco Fuortes (2018–2019, 2023–)
- Presented by: Daria Bignardi; Barbara D'Urso; Alessia Marcuzzi; Alfonso Signorini; Simona Ventura
- Country of origin: Italy
- Original language: Italian
- No. of series: 19
- No. of episodes: 333 (live shows)

Production
- Running time: 190–220 min (approx.)
- Production company: Endemol Shine Italy

Original release
- Network: Canale 5 (main show and daily recaps, 2000–); Italia 1 (daily recaps; 2014–); Stream TV (live; 2000–2003); Sky (live; 2004, 2008–2009); Mediaset Premium (live; 2006–2015); Mediaset Extra (live; 2018–); La5 (live; 2010–); Rete 4 (daily recaps; 2023–2024)
- Release: 14 September 2000 – present

Related
- Grande Fratello VIP

Grande Fratello (also known by the acronym GF) is the Italian version of the reality television franchise Big Brother, created by producer John de Mol Jr. in 1999, which began airing on 14 September 2000 on Canale 5, it has gone on to become a cultural phenomenon in Italy. The show follows the format of other national editions, in which a group of contestants, known as "housemates", live together in a specially constructed house that is isolated from the outside world. Live television cameras and personal audio microphones continuously monitor them. Throughout the competition, housemates are "evicted" from the house by public televoting. The last remaining housemate wins the competition and a cash prize. The series is named after the fictional totalitarian dictator from George Orwell's 1949 novel Nineteen Eighty-Four.

Over the course of its nineteen seasons, the program has been hosted by Daria Bignardi (2000–2001), Barbara D'Urso (2003–2004, 2018–2019), Alessia Marcuzzi (2006–2012, 2014–2015), Alfonso Signorini (2023–2025) and Simona Ventura (from 2025).

The reality show also had eight editions of the spin-off Grande Fratello VIP, reserved for famous people and one of the spin-off The Couple - Una vittoria per due, reserved for couples.

== Format ==
The old logo for the Italian version of Big Brother - Grande Fratello.

Based on the original Dutch version created by Endemol, the show sees a number of "housemates", divided by gender, social backgrounds and geographical locations, locked up together in a house, where the viewing public can watch them twenty-four hours a day, and vote them out of the house as they choose.

The housemates can visit the "confessional" at any time during the day, either to talk to psychologists if they need to, talk to "Big Brother", or to nominate.

The title is inspired by the George Orwell novel 1984. The novel tells of a Big Brother, head of the totalitarian state of Oceania that constantly monitors its inhabitants by the camera in an attempt to suppress their free will. The tag line of the novel is "Big Brother is watching you", which inspired the show, as it is Big Brother who now has total control over the situation in the house.

The housemates live in a house 24 hours a day, bugged by numerous cameras and microphones which capture their every move. Every week the housemates participate in tasks that determine their food budget for that week, or could even affect that week's nominations. The overall goal is to be the final surviving housemate and claim the prize fund. A PlayStation game based on this version was released in 2003.

== Cast ==
Season	Presenter	Reporter		Opinionist			Direction	
Season	Presenter	External	Social	Opinionist			Home	Studio
1	Daria Bignardi	Marco Liorni					Alessio Pollacci	Fosco Gasperi
2	Daria Bignardi	Marco Liorni					Alessio Pollacci	Fosco Gasperi
3	Barbara D'Urso	Marco Liorni					Alessio Pollacci	Fabio Calvi
4	Barbara D'Urso	Marco Liorni					Alessio Pollacci	Fabio Calvi
5	Barbara D'Urso	Marco Liorni					Alessio Pollacci	Fabio Calvi
6	Alessia Marcuzzi	Marco Liorni					Alessio Pollacci	Fabio Calvi
7	Alessia Marcuzzi	Marco Liorni					Alessio Pollacci	Fabio Calvi
8	Alessia Marcuzzi	Marco Liorni		Alfonso Signorini			Alessio Pollacci	Fabio Calvi
9	Alessia Marcuzzi			Alfonso Signorini			Alessio Pollacci	Fabio Calvi
10	Alessia Marcuzzi			Alfonso Signorini			Alessio Pollacci	Sergio Colabona
11	Alessia Marcuzzi			Alfonso Signorini			Alessio Pollacci	Sergio Colabona
12	Alessia Marcuzzi			Alfonso Signorini			Alessio Pollacci	Sergio Colabona
13	Alessia Marcuzzi			Manuela Arcuri (Note: Until the fourth live show.)	Cesare Cunaccia	Vladimir Luxuria (Note: From the fifth live show.)	Alessio Pollacci	Sergio Colabona
14	Alessia Marcuzzi		Chiara Tortorella	Cristiano Malgioglio	Claudio Amendola		Alessio Pollacci	Sergio Colabona
15	Barbara D'Urso			Cristiano Malgioglio	Simona Izzo		Marco Fuortes	Alessio Pollacci
16	Barbara D'Urso			Cristiano Malgioglio	Iva Zanicchi		Marco Fuortes	Alessio Pollacci
17	Alfonso Signorini		Rebecca Staffelli	Cesara Buonamici			Marco Fuortes	Alessio Pollacci
18	Alfonso Signorini		Rebecca Staffelli	Cesara Buonamici	Beatrice Luzzi		Marco Fuortes	Alessio Pollacci
19	Simona Ventura			Ascanio Pacelli	Cristina Plevani	Floriana Secondi	Marco Fuortes	Alessio Pollacci

== Location ==
Season	Location	
Season	Home	Studio
1	Cinecittà Studios, Rome	Theater 1 of Cinecittà, Rome
2	Cinecittà Studios, Rome	Theater 1 of Cinecittà, Rome
3	Cinecittà Studios, Rome	Theater 5 of Cinecittà, Rome
4	Cinecittà Studios, Rome	Theater 5 of Cinecittà, Rome
5	Cinecittà Studios, Rome	Theater 5 of Cinecittà, Rome
6	Cinecittà Studios, Rome	Palastudio of Cinecittà, Rome
7	Cinecittà Studios, Rome	Palastudio of Cinecittà, Rome
8	Cinecittà Studios, Rome	Palastudio of Cinecittà, Rome
9	Cinecittà Studios, Rome	Palastudio of Cinecittà, Rome
10	Cinecittà Studios, Rome	Palastudio of Cinecittà, Rome
11	Cinecittà Studios, Rome	Palastudio of Cinecittà, Rome
12	Cinecittà Studios, Rome	Palastudio of Cinecittà, Rome
13	Cinecittà Studios, Rome	Palastudio of Cinecittà, Rome
14	Cinecittà Studios, Rome	Palastudio of Cinecittà, Rome
15	Cinecittà Studios, Rome	Palastudio of Cinecittà, Rome
16	Cinecittà Studios, Rome	Palastudio of Cinecittà, Rome
17	Cinecittà Studios, Rome	Voxson studios, Rome
18	Lumina Studios, Rome	
19	Lumina Studios, Rome	

== Series details and viewership ==
Season	Days	Housemates	Winner	Runner-up	Episodes	Originally released			Grand prize	Average viewers (millions)	Average share
Season	Days	Housemates	Winner	Runner-up	Episodes	First released	Last released	Network	Grand prize	Average viewers (millions)	Average share
1	99	10	Cristina Plevani	Salvatore "Salvo" Veneziano	15	14 September 2000	21 December 2000	Canale 5	₤250,000,000	9.82	37.00%
2	92	16	Flavio Montrucchio	Emanuela "Lalla" Sempio	14	20 September 2001	20 December 2001	Canale 5	₤250,000,000	8.00	32.74%
3	99	16	Floriana Secondi	Victoria Pennington	15	30 January 2003	8 May 2003	Canale 5	€250,000	8.00	33.15%
4	106	15	Serena Garitta	Patrick Ray Pugliese	16	22 January 2004	6 May 2004	Canale 5	€300,000	8.44	33.89%
5	71	17	Jonathan Kashanian	Catrina Davies	11	23 September 2004	2 December 2004	Canale 5	€250,000	6.86	30.70%
6	99	20	Augusto De Megni	Filippo Bisciglia	15	19 January 2006	27 April 2006	Canale 5	€900,000	6.51	31.68%
7	92	19	Milo Coretti	Alessandro Tersigni	14	18 January 2007	19 April 2007	Canale 5	€500,000	5.57	25.80%
8	92	21	Mario Ferretti	Teresa Stinziani	14	21 January 2008	21 April 2008	Canale 5	€500,000	5.46	25.19%
9	99	23	Ferdi Berisa	Marcello Torre Calabria	16	12 January 2009	20 April 2009	Canale 5	€300,000	6.63	29.17%
10	134	26	Mauro Marin	Giorgio Ronchini	20	26 October 2009	8 March 2010	Canale 5	€250,000	6.16	27.83%
11	183	34	Andrea Hirai Cocco	Ferdinando Giordano	27	18 October 2010	18 April 2011	Canale 5	€300,000	5.43	23.55%
12	161	36	Sabrina Mbarek	Gaia Elide Bruschini	24	24 October 2011	1 April 2012	Canale 5	€240,000	3.85	17.40%
13	85	17	Mirco Petrilli	Francesca "Chicca" Rocco	13	3 March 2014	26 May 2014	Canale 5	€250,000	4.12	19.15%
14	78	19	Federica Lepanto	Domenico Manfredi	12	24 September 2015	10 December 2015	Canale 5	€200,000	3.52	18.74%
15	49	17	Alberto Mezzetti	Alessia Prete	8	17 April 2018	4 June 2018	Canale 5	€100,000	3.88	23.25%
16	64	19	Martina Nasoni	Enrico Contarin	10	8 April 2019	10 June 2019	Canale 5	€100,000	3.25	19.94%
17	197	35	Perla Vatiero	Beatrice Luzzi	47	11 September 2023	25 March 2024	Canale 5	€100,000	2.44	18.59%
18	197	34	Jessica Morlacchi	Helena Prestes	42	16 September 2024	31 March 2025	Canale 5	€100,000	2.12	16.76%
19	81	18	Anita Mazzotta	Giulia Soponariu	14	29 September 2025	18 December 2025	Canale 5	€110,000	1.89	14.93%

== Popularity ==
The program has broken several records, including exceeding a 50% share of the ratings (with peaks of 60% during season one). The fifth season recorded a decline in ratings which was put down to both the competition from rival reality television shows and the season's poor and hasty production. By the ninth season, the show recorded increasing ratings which took the program back to its original popularity.

Despite a decline in viewing figures over the years (especially in the twelfth season), Grande Fratello is still one of the most successful reality shows in Italy.
