= Marianella Bargilli =

Italian actress

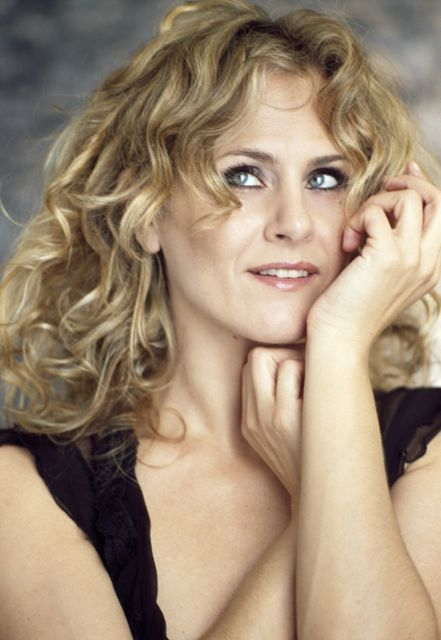
- Marianella Bargilli in 2008
- Born: 27 February 1971 (age 55); Cecina, Italy
- Occupation: Actress

Marianella Bargilli (born 27 February 1971) is an Italian actress.

== Television ==
From May 2015 she plays the role of Rosaura in Il bugiardo of Goldoni, directed by Alfredo Arias. The show debuted at the Napoli Teatro Festival Italia in June 2015. In the same year she plays the role of Donata in fiction Baciato dal sole, directed by Antonello Grimaldi, aired from February 22, 2016, on Rai 1.
