= Alfonso Signorini =

Italian journalist and television host

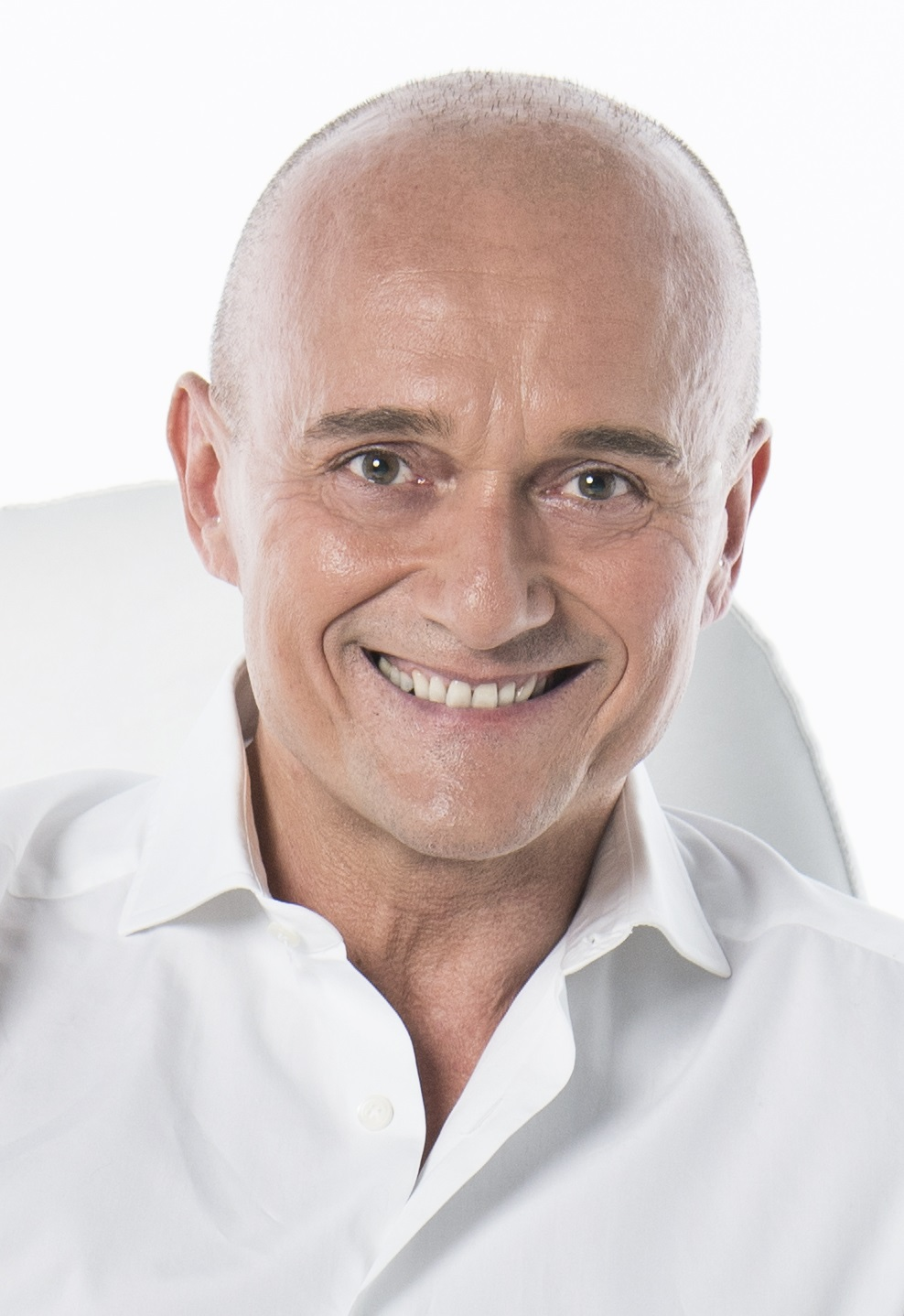
- Signorini in 2017
- Born: Alfonso Piero Signorini; 7 April 1964 (age 62); Milan, Italy
- Occupations: Television host; writer
- Years active: 2002–present

Alfonso Piero Signorini, simply known as Alfonso Signorini (born 7 April 1964) is an Italian television host and journalist.

== Biography ==
Signorini was born in Milan. He was engaged to Paolo Galimberti. He considers himself Roman Catholic.

== Career ==
He made his television debut in 2002, when he was a regular guest on the Rai 2 late-night show Chiambretti c'è , hosted by Piero Chiambretti . In the following years, he was a regular guest on numerous programs, most notably L'isola dei famosi . In the 2005/2006 television season, he co -hosted Verissimo with Paola Perego , a program he would co-host the following year with Silvia Toffanin on Saturday afternoons. On Friday evenings, he was part of the large cast of Scherzi a parte , even participating in the production of several candid camera sessions and interviewing the victims of the pranks in each episode.

From 2006 to 2016, he hosted the program Alfonso Signorini Show on Radio Monte Carlo , broadcast from 9 to 10 in the morning together with Luisella Berrino . Also in 2006, he made a cameo appearance in the film Commediasexi , where he played himself. From 2008 to 2012, he was a regular commentator on Big Brother for five consecutive seasons.

On 23 June 2008 he became director of TV Sorrisi e Canzoni , whilst maintaining the direction of Chi , taking over from Umberto Brindani .

== Legal Issues ==
At the end of 2025 Alfonso Signorini was involved in a series of media accusations regarding alleged sexual abuse and power dynamics linked to the programme Big Brother VIP . The affair originated from the publication of some videos on YouTube by Fabrizio Corona , another well-known television personality and host of the online format Falsissimo : in his interventions, Corona claimed the existence of an alleged "Signorini system", described as an opaque mechanism based on sexual favours and private relationships which, according to his statements, would have affected the selection of the contestants of Big Brother VIP and, more generally, on access to the television world.

Corona claims that following his first video on the subject, Signorini reported him on charges of revenge porn . Following the diffusion of private images of Alfonso Signorini in the program Falsissimo , the Milan Public Prosecutor's Office ordered the seizure of all the material. Among the cases cited, the name of Antonio Medugno emerged, a former contestant of Big Brother VIP , who on that occasion took part in an interview with Corona.

Medugno is said to have filed a complaint against Signorini, asking the judiciary to evaluate the existence of the alleged illicit activities and any possible responsibilities of third parties. The videos also mention alleged messages, photographs and private conversations which, according to what is stated, took place between Medugno and Signorini. Corona claims that in addition to Medugno, a large number of similar cases have occurred, which have involved other aspiring contestants on the TV programme.

Because of these accusations, on December 29 Signorini suspends himself from Mediaset . The following day the Milan Public Prosecutor's Office , following Medugno's complaint, opens an investigation against Signorini for sexual violence and extortion .

== Filmography ==
=== Television ===
- Chiambretti c'è (Rai 2, 2002)
- L'isola dei famosi (Rai 2, 2003–2007)
- Markette (La7, 2004–2008)
- Ritorno al presente (Rai 1, 2005)
- Verissimo (Canale 5, 2006–2012)
- Scherzi a parte (Canale 5, 2007)
- Grande Fratello (Canale 5, 2008–2012; 2023–2025)
- Maurizio Costanzo Show (Canale 5, 2009)
- Kalispéra! (Canale 5, 2010–2011)
- La notte degli chef (Canale 5, 2011)
- Opera on Ice (Canale 5, 2011–2012)
- Studio 5 (Canale 5, 2013)
- Grande Fratello VIP (Canale 5, 2016–2023)

=== Books ===
- Costantino desnudo, s.l., Maestrale Company-Lele Mora, 2004. ISBN 88-18-01715-2.
- Il Signorini. Chi c'è c'è, chi non c'è s'incazza, Milano, Mondadori, 2006. ISBN 88-04-55930-6.
- Troppo fiera, troppo fragile. Il romanzo della Callas, Milano, Mondadori, 2007. ISBN 9788804571841.
- Chanel. Una vita da favola, Milano, Mondadori, 2009. ISBN 9788804583738.
- Blu come il sangue. Storie di delitti nell'alta società, con Massimo Picozzi, Milano, Mondadori, 2010. ISBN 9788804594857.
- Marylin. Vivere e morire d'amore, Milano, Mondadori, 2010. ISBN 9788804598121.
- L'altra parte di me, Milano, Mondadori, 2015. ISBN 9788804646259.
- Ciò che non muore mai. Il romanzo di Chopin, Milano, Mondadori, 2017.
