= Alberto Magliozzi =

Italian glamour photographer

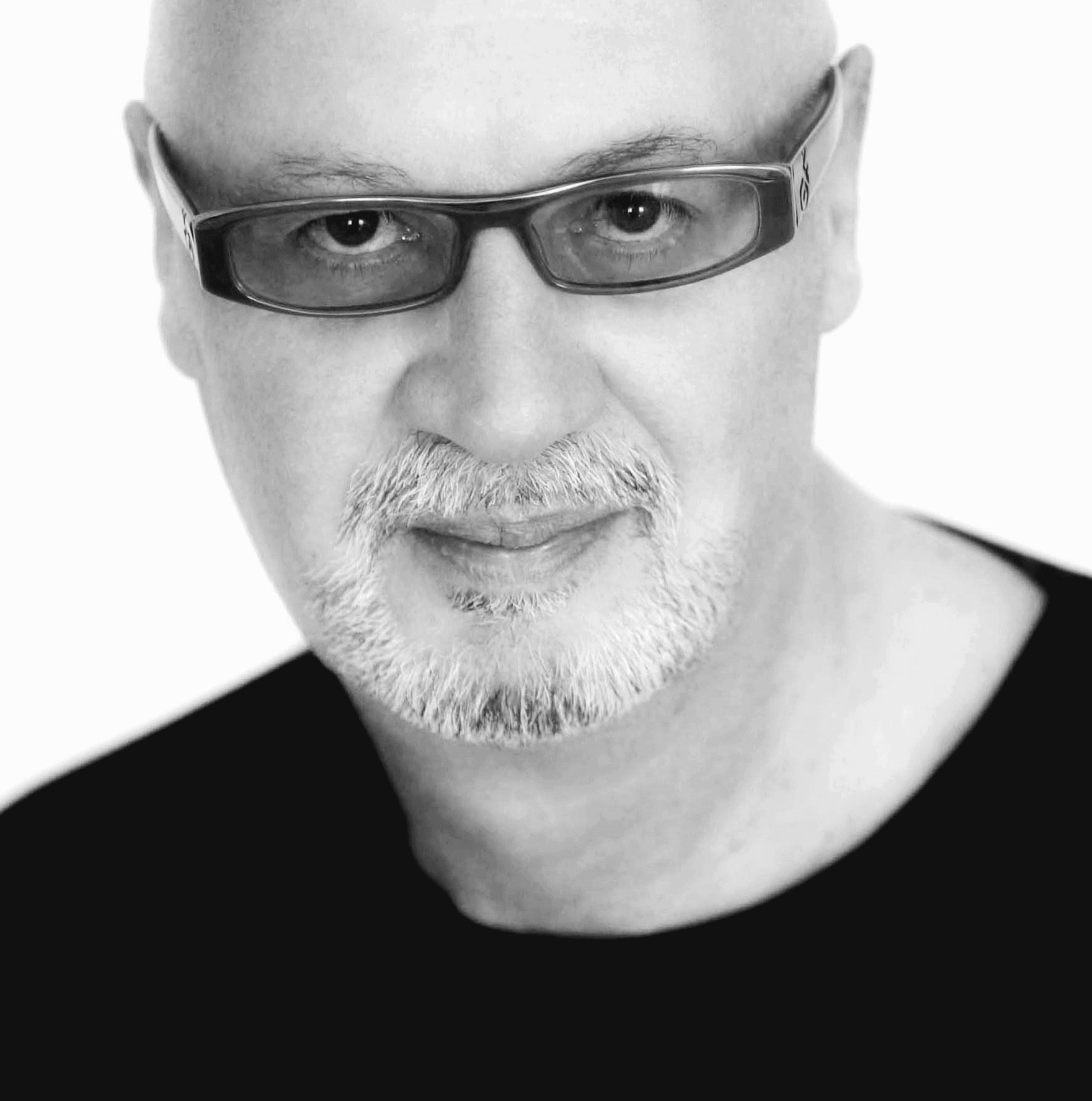
- Born: Alberto Magliozzi; September 17, 1949 (age 77); Nettuno, Italy
- Occupation: photographer
- Years active: 1968–present

Alberto Magliozzi (born September 17, 1949, in Nettuno) is an Italian glamour photographer.

Magliozzi prefers to shoot in black and white instead of color, and uses analogue film instead of digital. His style has created a counter-trend, with him being credited as an originator of shooting with medium-format equipment. During his career, he has photographed many famous women. In some cases, his photography has created scandals. Articles about Magliozzi have appeared in various magazines, including Playboy and Penthouse.

== Biography ==
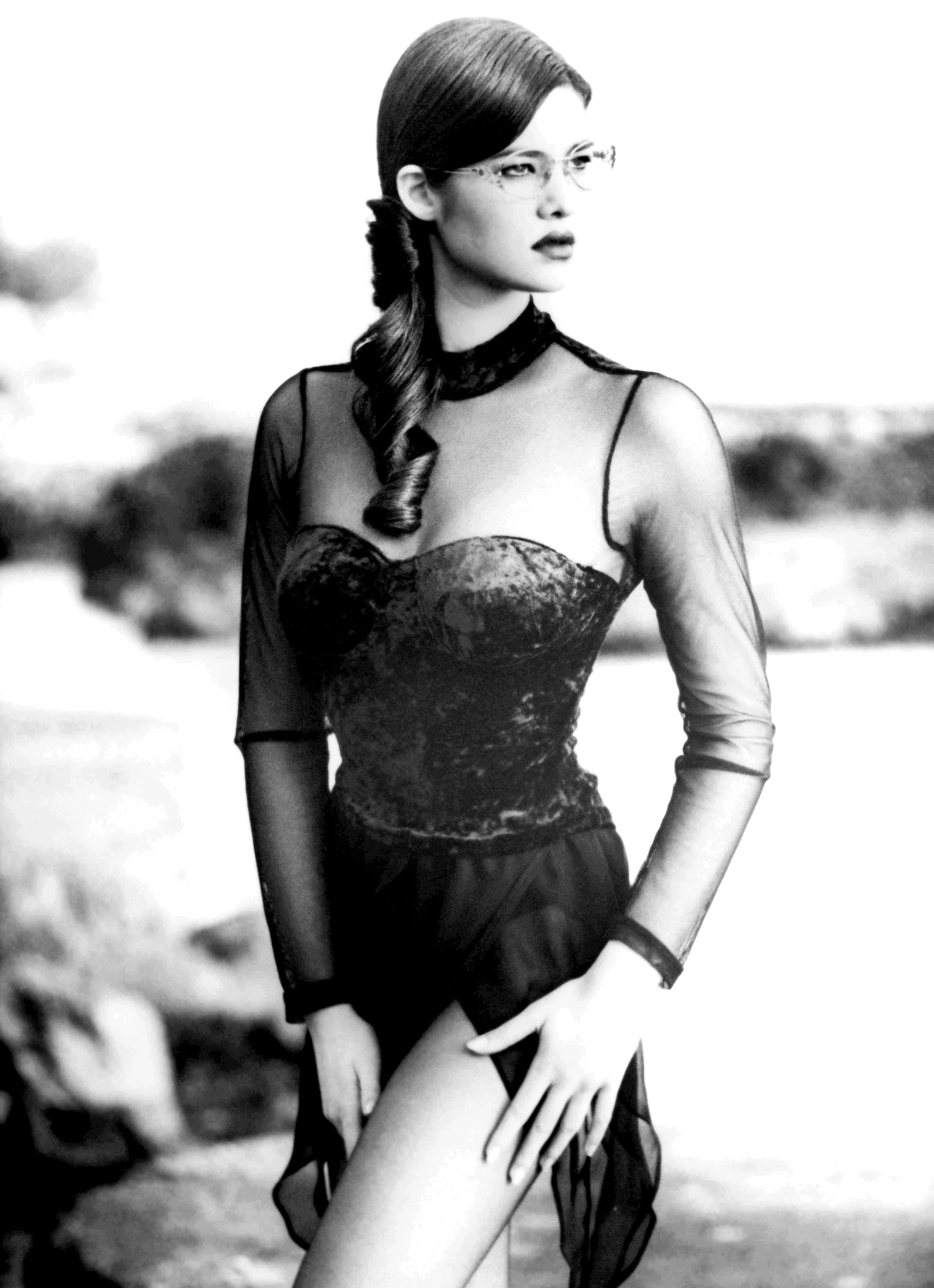
Manuela Arcuri, 1995

Magliozzi was born in Nettuno in 1949, the first of three brothers, to Gastone and Vittoria Liberati. When he was six, he was registered in private piano and accordion lessons. Magliozzi enrolled in classical studies at San Francesco in the Lazio town, but never completed his studies. He was inspired by a Tony Esposito concert to form a band called the Bum Group in 1967. They performed in clubs on the peninsula and at the Tartana club in Follonica in 1969. That same year, he met the guitarist Peter Van Wood who suggested doing a tour with Renato Rascel. The first stop was Elba Island. Magliozzi, who had a Leica M3 with him, decided to photograph the models, and Schuberth asked to view his shots. The two met in Rome, and Schuberth recommended that Magliozzi devote himself more to photography after seeing the pictures. Magliozzi moved to Milan to take courses in professional photography and collaborate with the photographer Francesco Escalar until 1990.

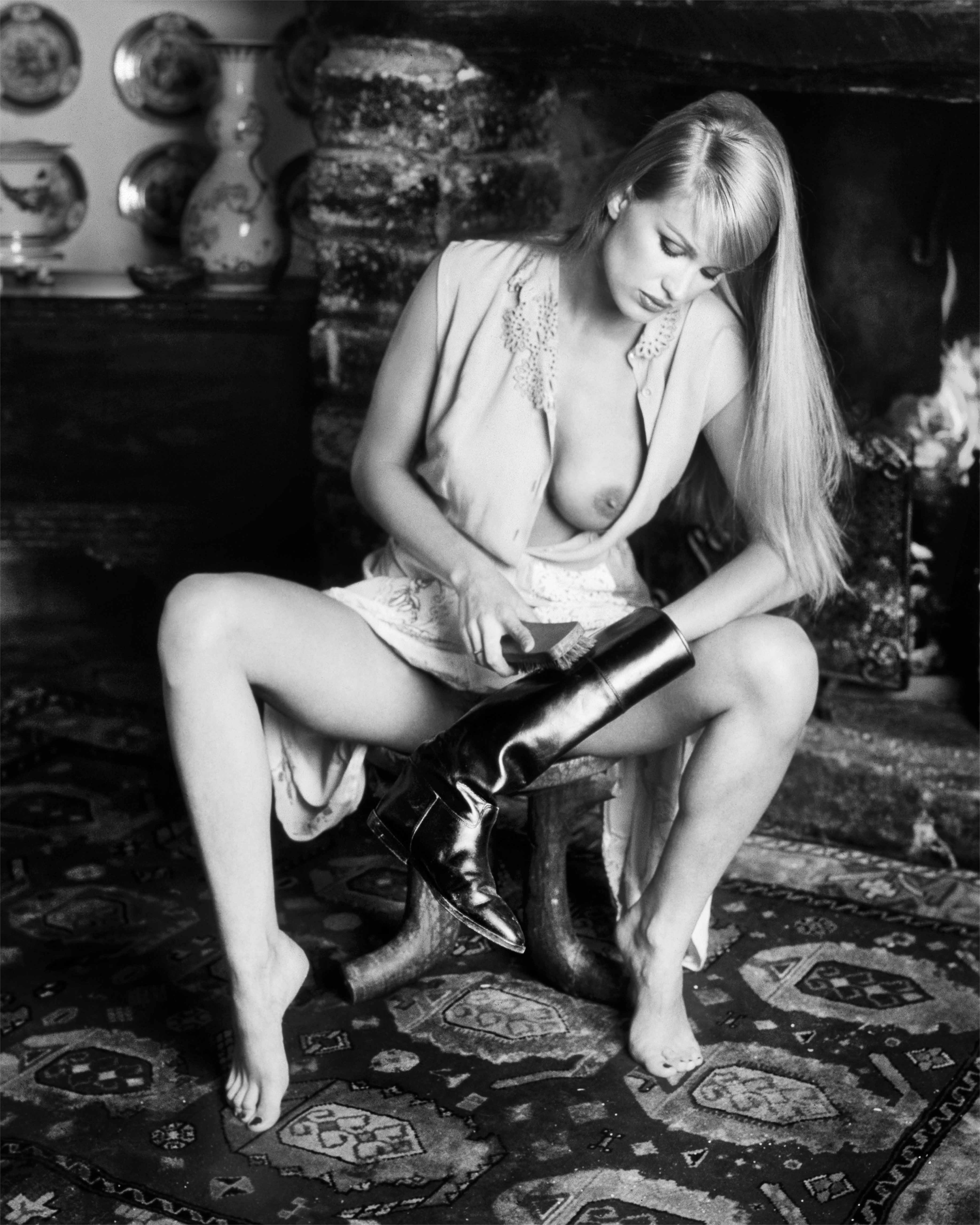
Éva Henger, 1997

In addition to reports that have appeared in Playboy and Penthouse, Magliozzi's reports have appeared in several other fashion and glamour magazines such as Marie Claire, TU Style of Mondadori, Maxim, and Boss Magazine.

== Glamour as a social pretext ==
The glamour conceived by Magliozzi has always been soft. According to him, the photos of him can be defined as "mischievous", "sexy", often "provocative", but never "hard". Faces and female bodies also for works apparently irreconcilable with his photographic themes, even temporary living "installations", in disparate "natural" locations, but almost never preconstructed and artificial.

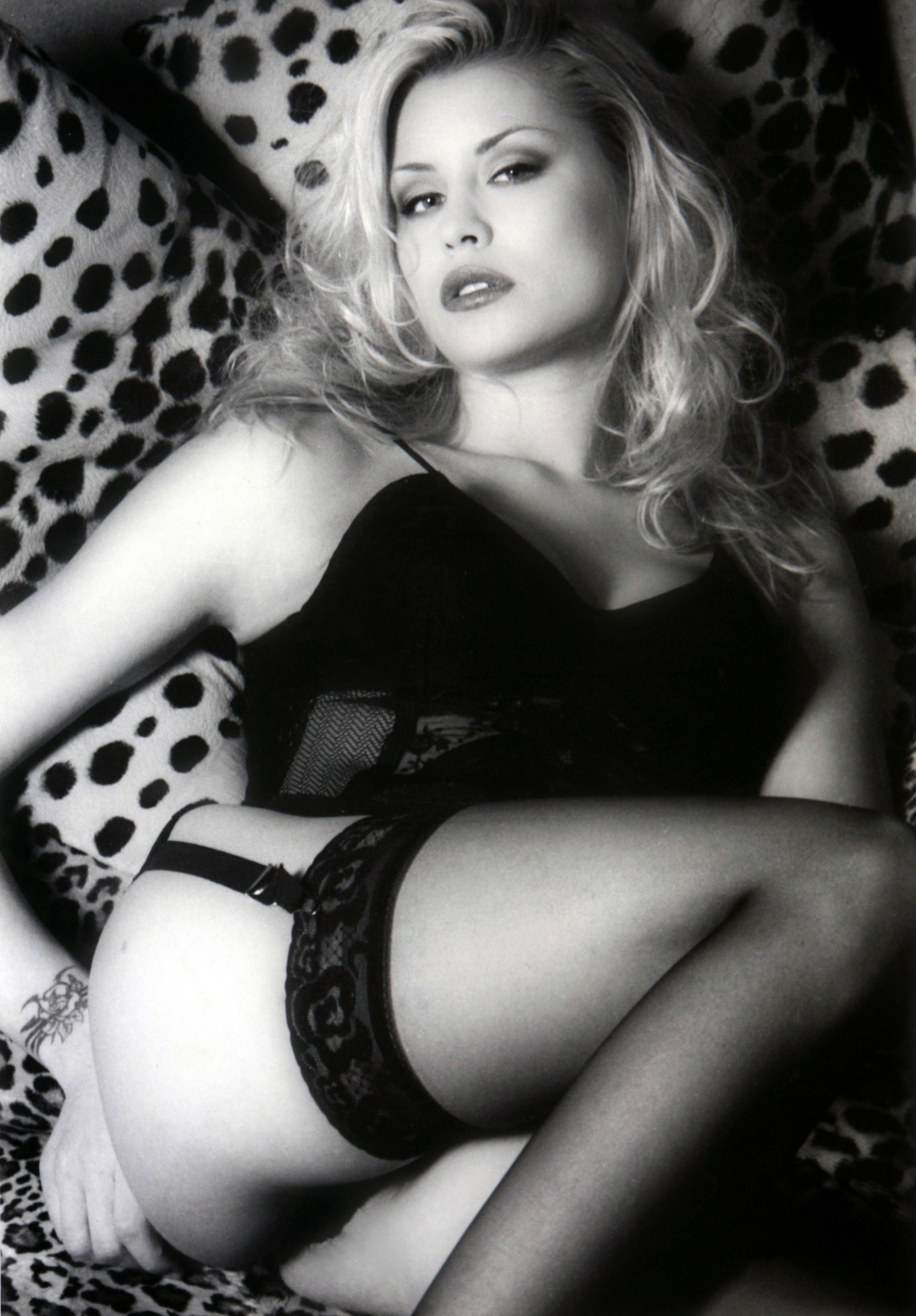
Elenoire Casalegno, 1997: Penthouse of November 1997 dedicated the cover to this photo by Magliozzi

For Magliozzi, "wine and the senses" are an essential combination, and he wanted to demonstrate the concept with a work in 2015 on the most famous wines of Sardinia.

In Magliozzi's opinion, glamour can also be used as a means of social denunciation by addressing issues such asdrugs, violence and peace as opposed to war. His photographic book, Portraits of Life, dedicated four different sections to drugs, violence, and peace with a fourth section in which the models simulate the "dream" of "better expectations".

In the field of communication, Magliozzi led as president the "top of the jury examining the works" of one of the largest photographic competitions ever held in Trieste: Communicating with images: photography. The competition as explained by Il Piccolo was a "'competition of ideas', a small laboratory of color, ideas, techniques and interpretations to highlight the entire territory of Trieste, at its best-known corners or niches to be rediscovered [...] is part of the recent proposals launched by 'Il Giulia per Trieste', a form of support for the enhancement of the city."

=== Scandals ===
An inconvenient person who has a "militant" concept of the profession [...] the use of the image as a denunciation. We must be not very accommodating if we want to tell the things of the world that are then those that surround us

— La Repubblica on Magliozzi

Magliozzi used his calendars as means of denunciation and protest, and to arouse the indignation and reactions, including international ones several times. In 2003, the "Madonnas" calendar was created in the deconsecrated churches of the Sassi di Matera by models and young local girls photographed half-naked to address the religious theme of the Madonna, understood as a simple "undressed woman" from the religious significance attributed by some churches. In 2009, he created the "Weapon of mass distraction" calendar, in which he photographed the then-unknown Italian Alessandra Bosco, wife of a sergeant at the US airbase in Katterbach Kaserne, Germany.

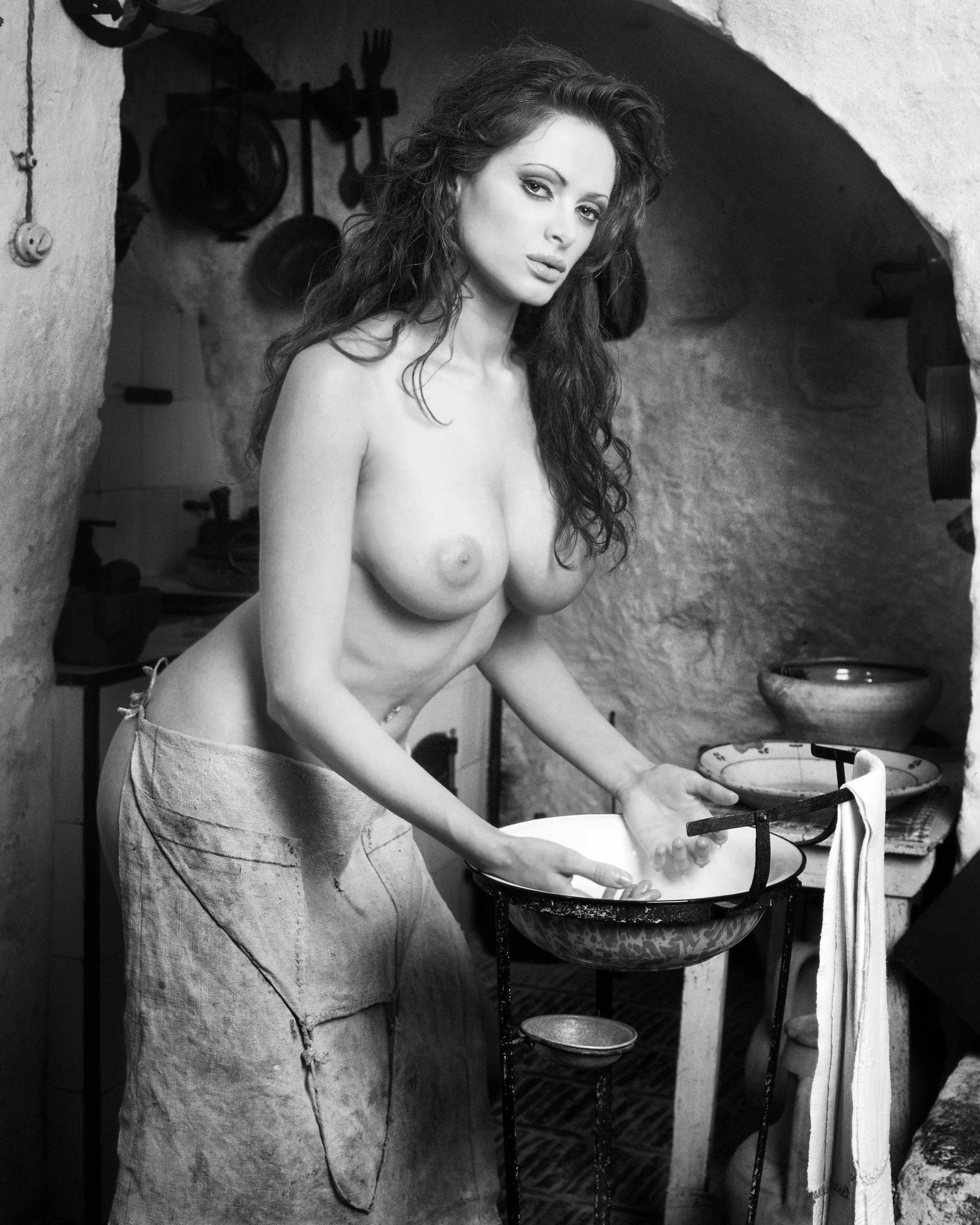
Francesca Tritto, 2003, one of the models of the controversial "Madonne" calendar

Magliozzi was excommunicated by the Bishop of Matera for "Madonnas". ITN broadcast the "blasphemous calendar" to the main television broadcasters in the English world with the photos provided by Reuters. The second calendar, taken at the American base, provoked reactions from amused soldiers and their "jealous wives", as well as indignation from military leaders. The "scandalous case" was mentioned in Stars and Stripes.

== Photobooks ==
- Alberto Magliozzi, Ritratti di vita, prima edizione, Naples, Eman multimedial, 2007, ISBN 978-88-95509-00-6.[28]
- Alberto Magliozzi, Ritratti di vita, seconda edizione, Girifalco, Società Editrice Montecovello, 2011, ISBN 978-88-97425-08-3.
- Alberto Magliozzi, Ritratti di vita, terza edizione, Milan, Russano Editore, 2011, ISBN 978-88-6281-329-7.
- Alberto Magliozzi, l'Arte, il Vino, i Sensi..., Padua, Altromondo Editore, 2009, ISBN 978-88-6281-329-7. Anche nel catalogo del Polo BNCF Biblioteca Nazionale Centrale di Firenze
- Alberto Magliozzi, L'accezione erotica, Rome, Polaris Group, 1995. Anche nel catalogo del Polo BNCF Biblioteca Nazionale Centrale di Firenze

== Calendars ==
- 1997 : Éva Henger
- 2002 : Stefania Orlando
- 2003 : Madonne (tiratura 40,000 copie)
- 2003 : Manuela Arcuri
- 2004 : Manuela Arcuri
- 2004 : Miriana Trevisan
- 2005 : Iridi di pace sull'oceano della vita
- 2005 : Lyudmyla Derkach
- 2006 : Terra Bruna con Maddalena Ferrara
- 2007 : Carolina Rivelli
- 2007 : Sabrina Ghio
- 2009 : Weapon of mass distraction

== Exhibitions ==
- 2016, Reactive in the Mirror, collettiva, Berlino
- 2014, collettiva, Melbourne
- 2010, personale, Florence (Sala del Gonfalone di Palazzo Panciatichi)
- 2010, personale, Florence (Libreria Feltrinelli)
- 2007, personale, Milan (Libreria Hoepli)
- 2006, collettiva, Amsterdam
- 2005, personale, Turin (Libreria Lattes)
- 2005, personale, Florence (Sala Gigli di Palazzo Panciatichi)
- 2004, personale, Budapest
- 2002, personale, Prague
- 2001, personale, Hamburg

== Gallery ==
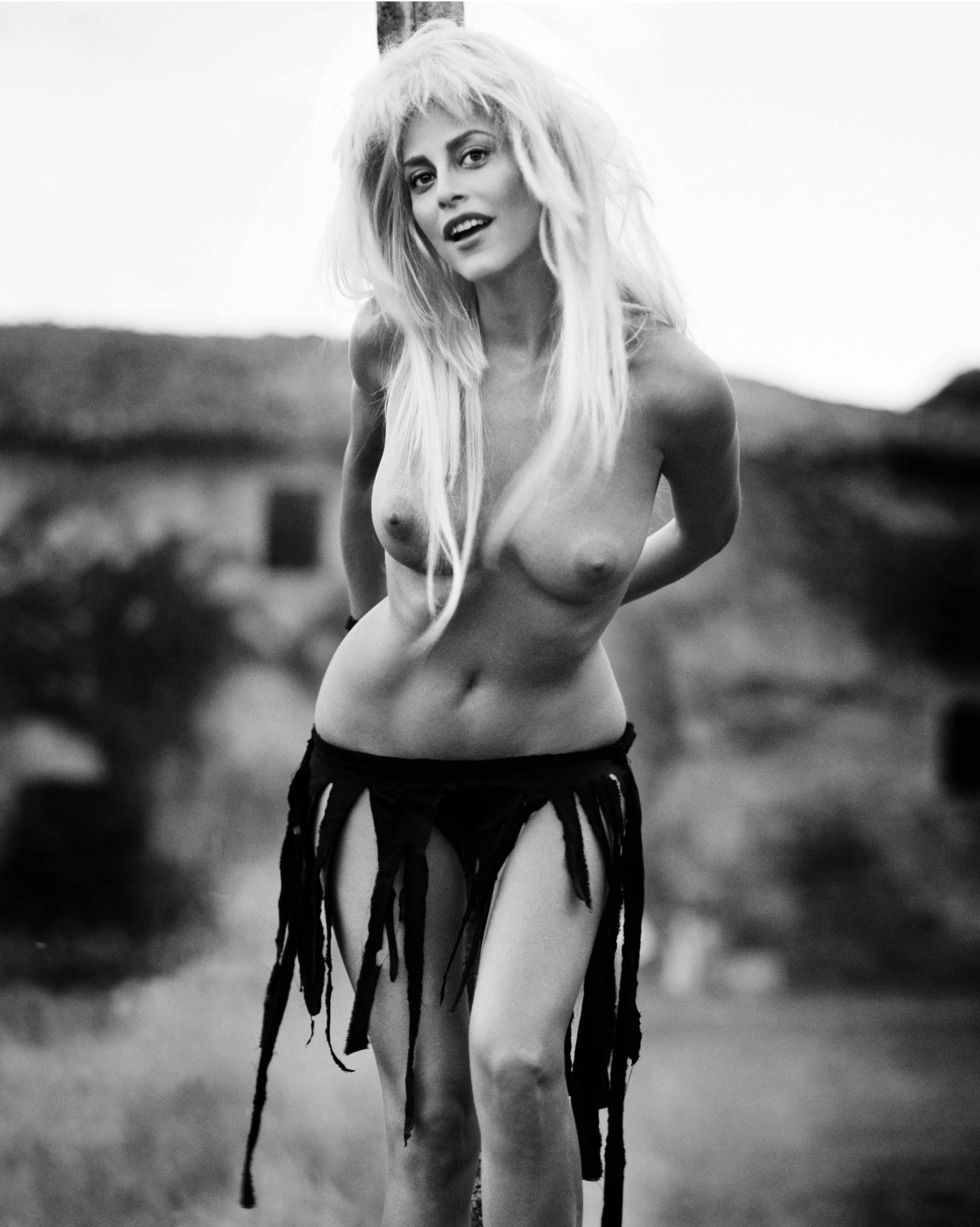
Stefania Orlando (2001)

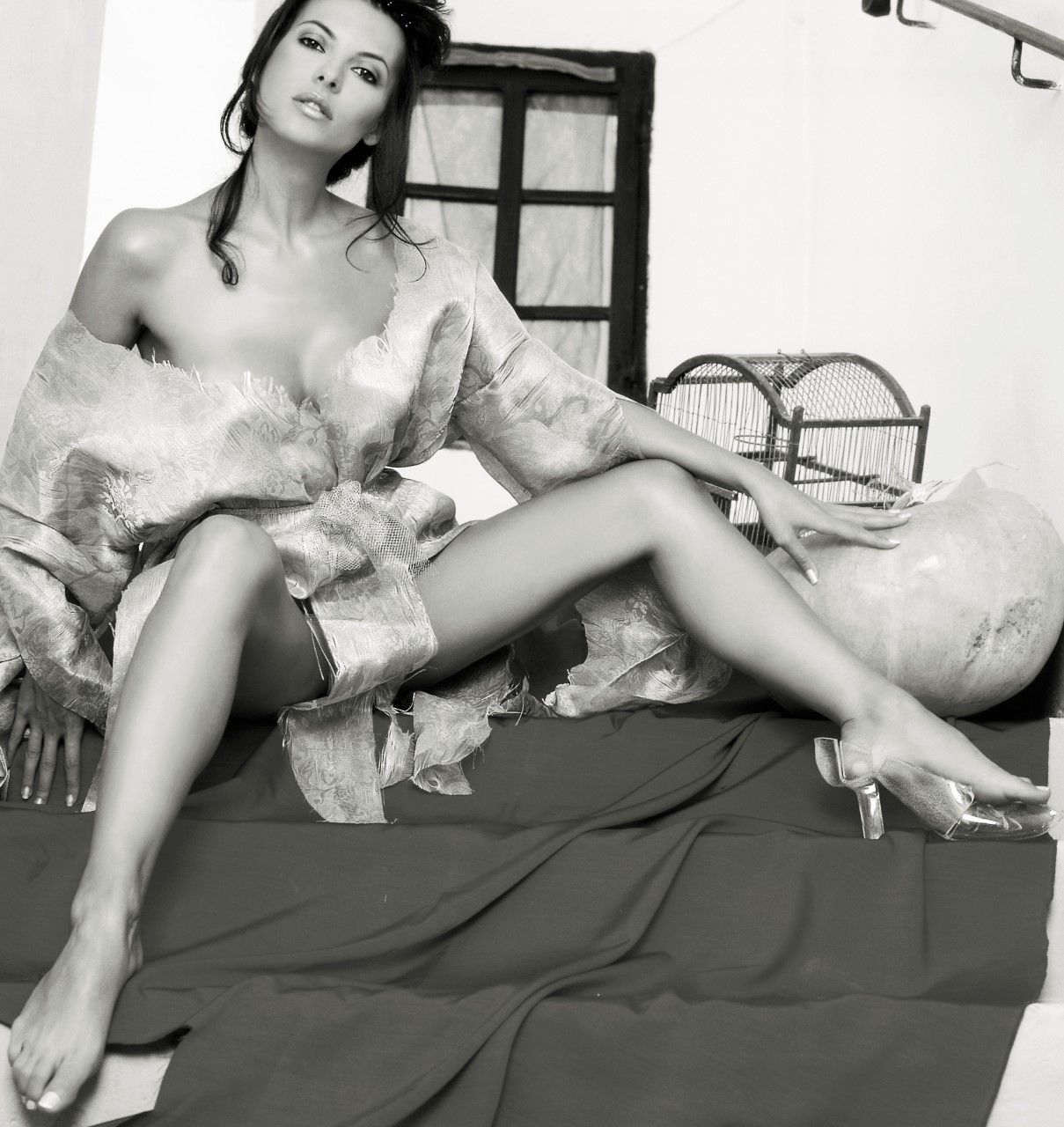
Miriana Trevisan (2004)

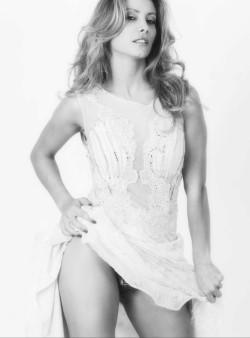
Antonella Salvucci (2016)

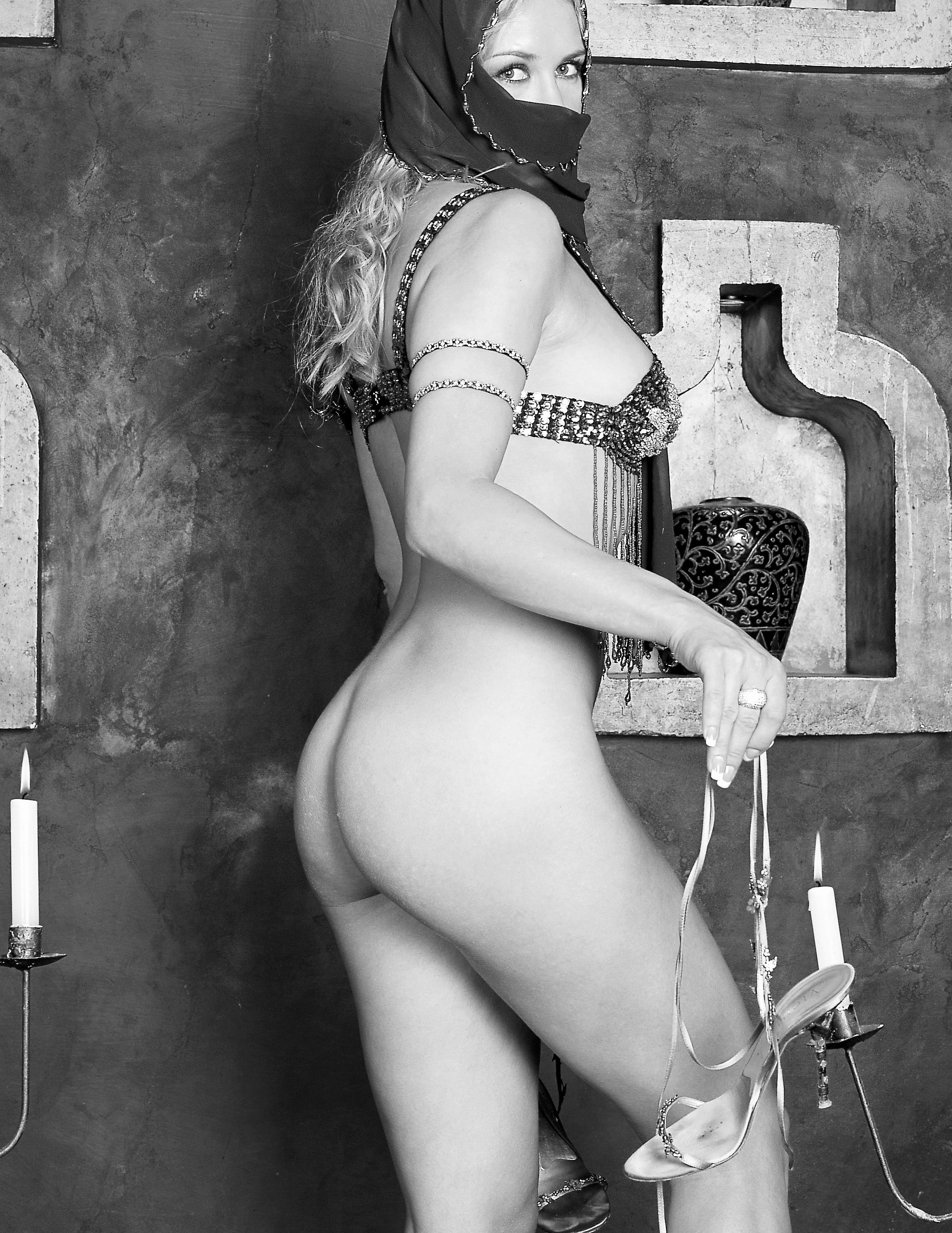
Lyudmyla Derkach (2005)

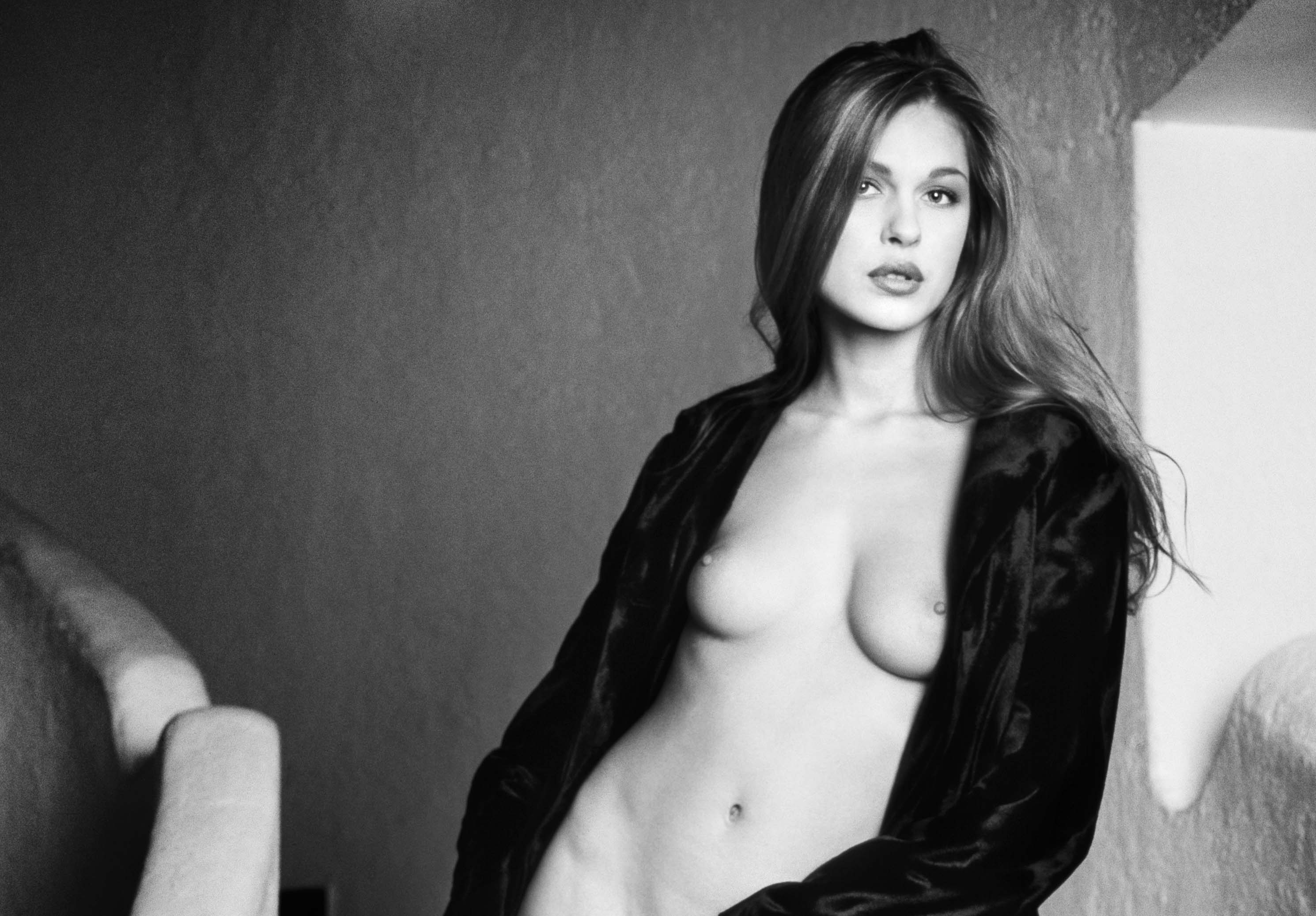
Victoria Laufer (2001)

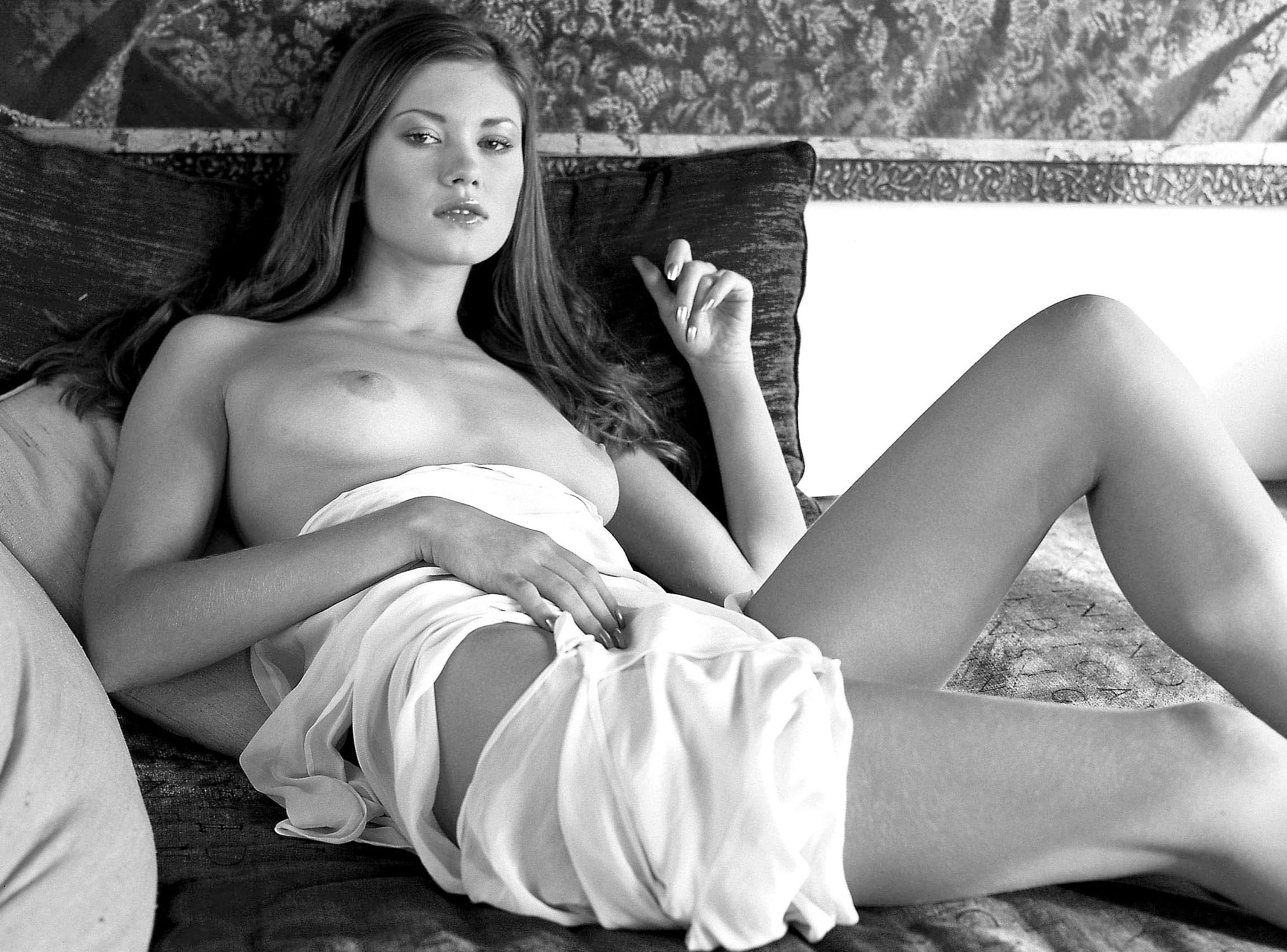
Nastia Kirichenko (2001)

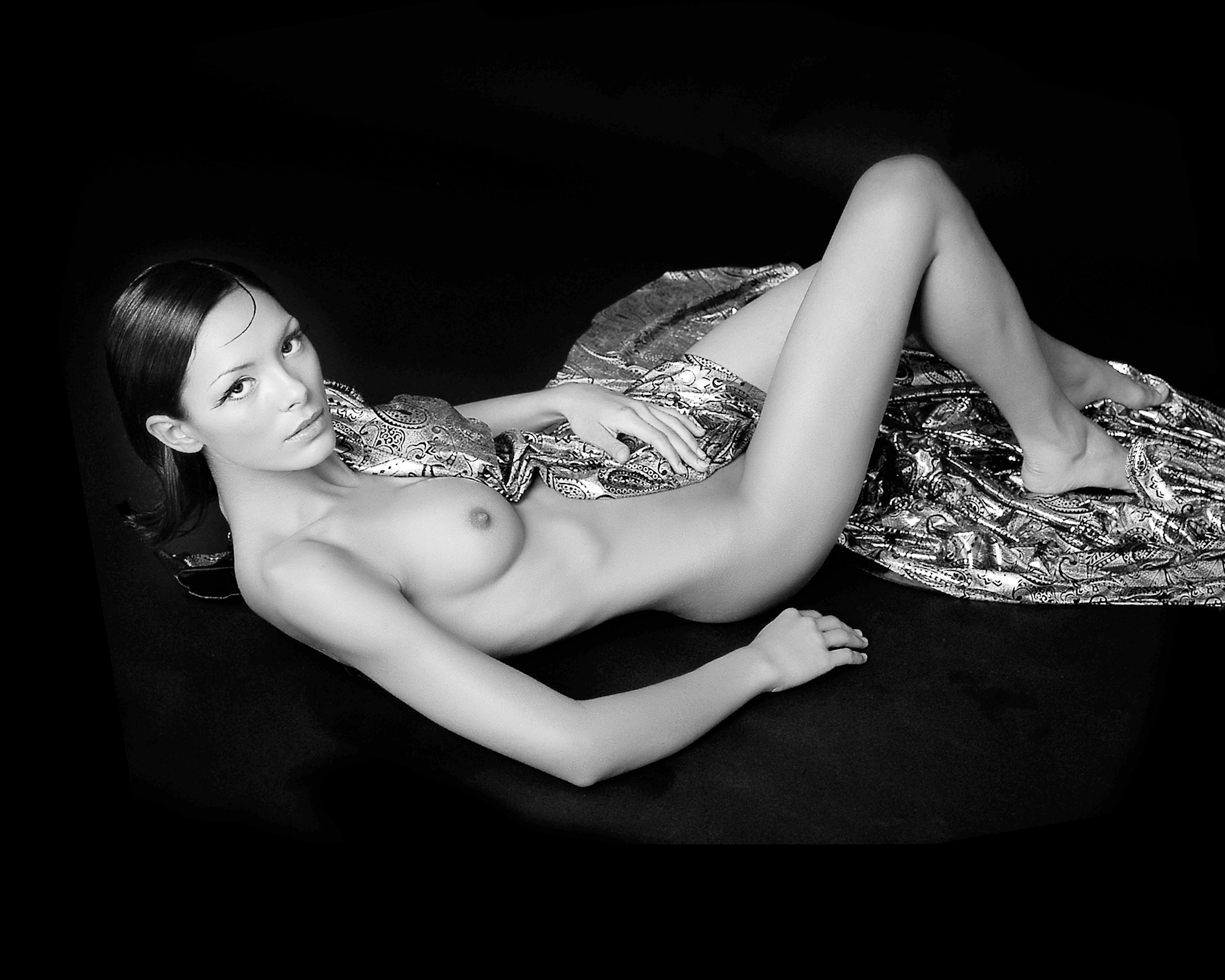
Vinia (1997)

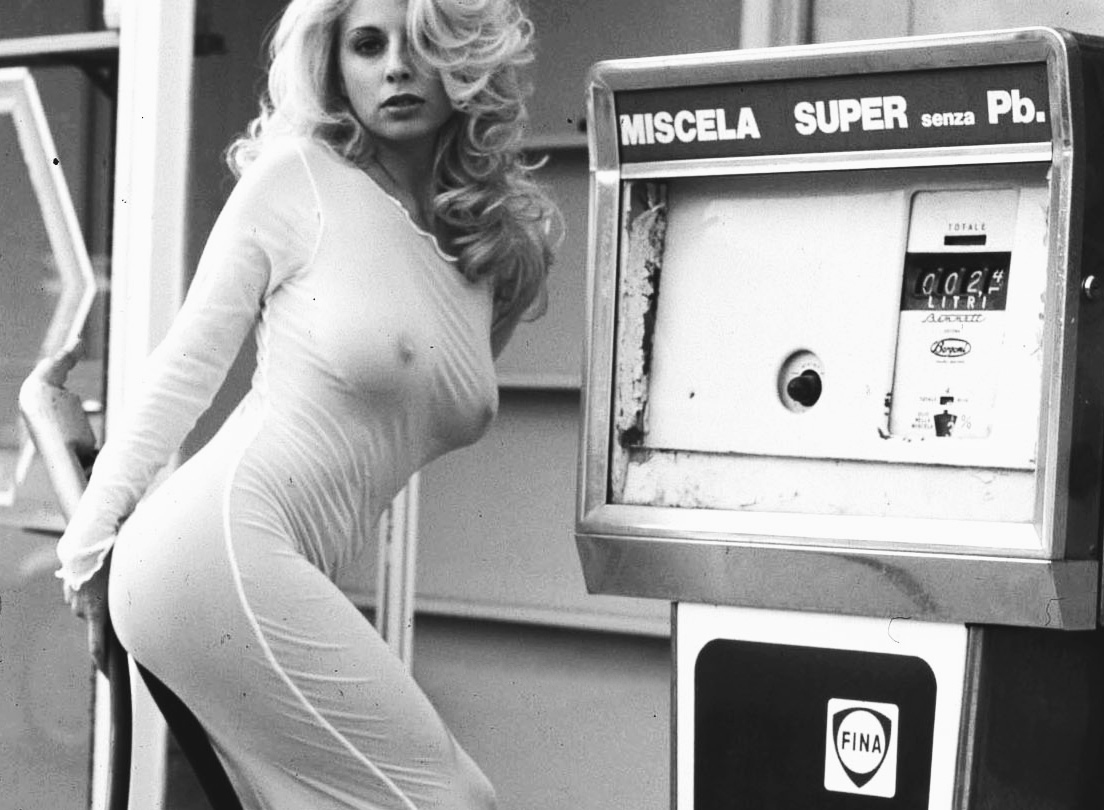
Sara Cosmi su Penthouse (1997)

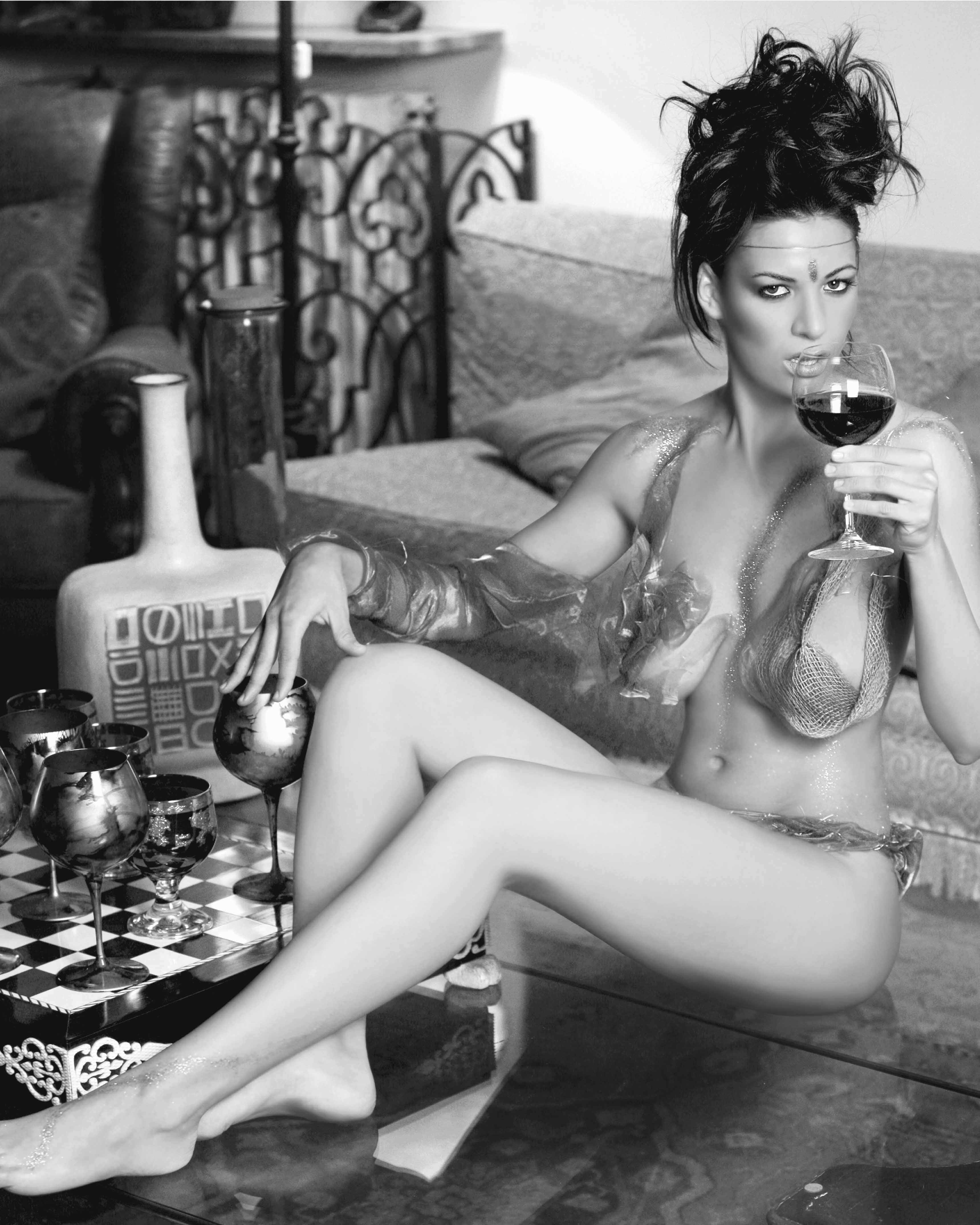
Layca D'Agostino, dal libro L'arte, il vino, i sensi... (2009)

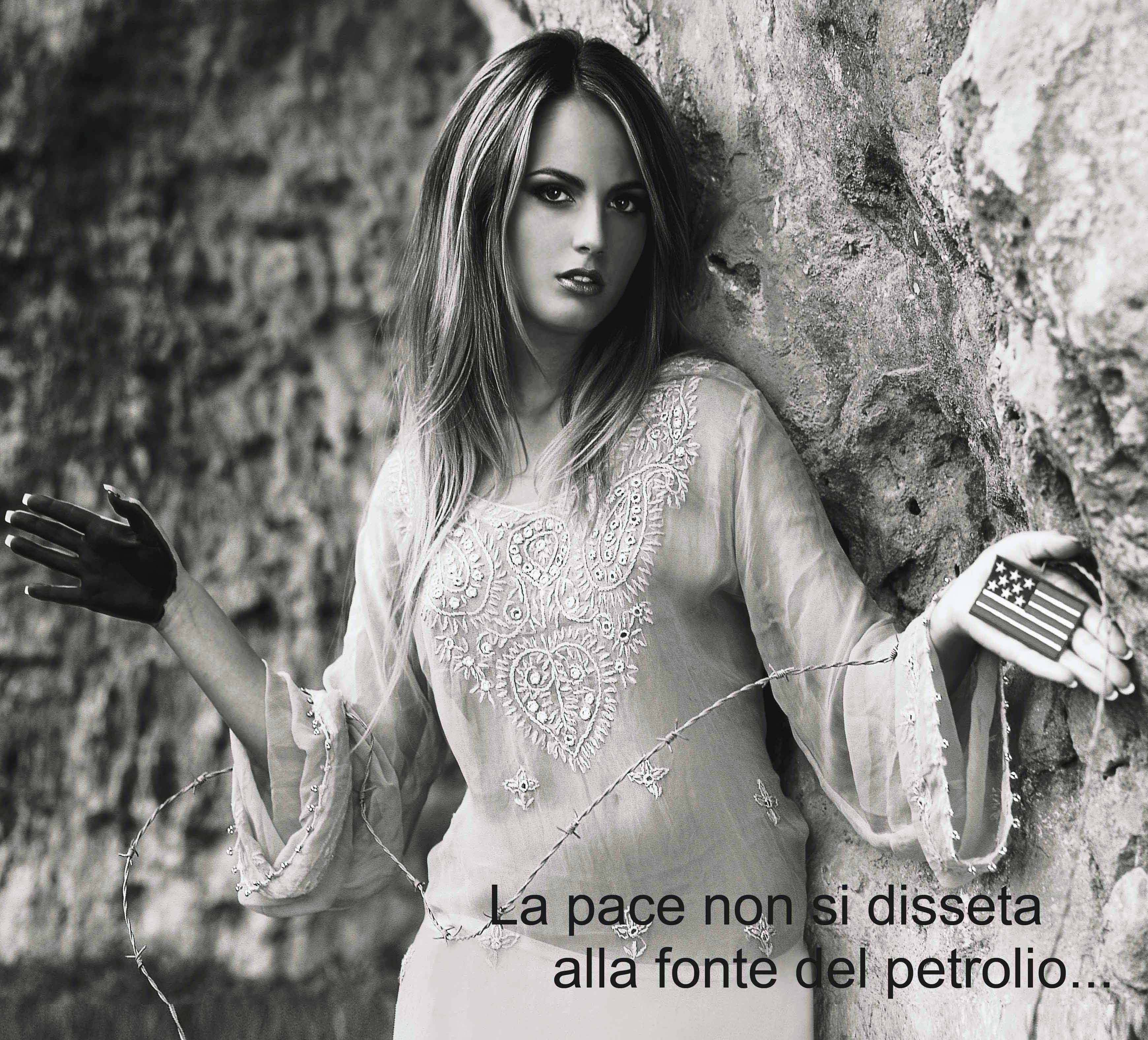
Silvia Altobello, da Iridi di pace sull'oceano della vita, calendario (2005)

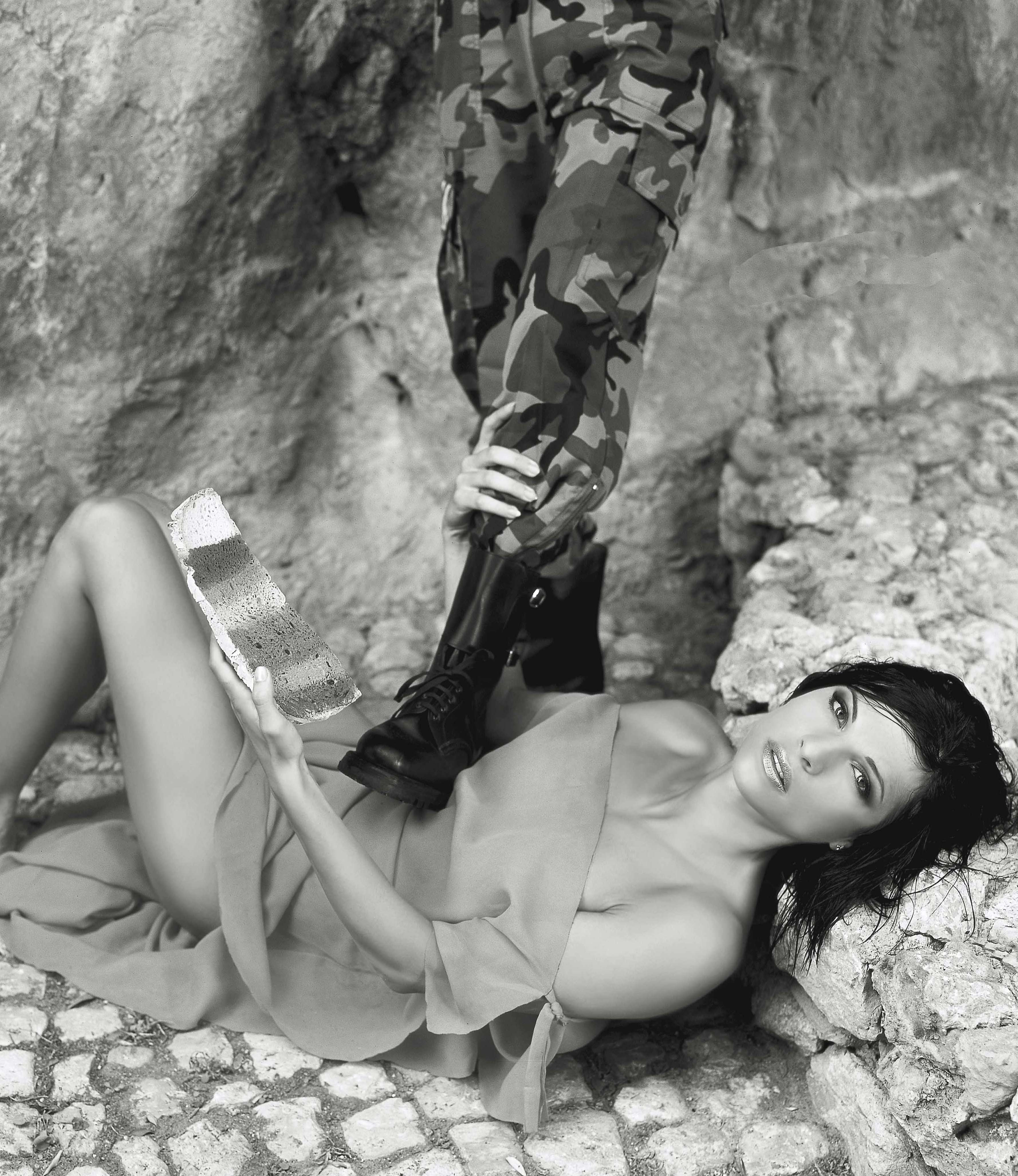
Francesca Trentinella, da Iridi di pace sull'oceano della vita, calendario (2005)

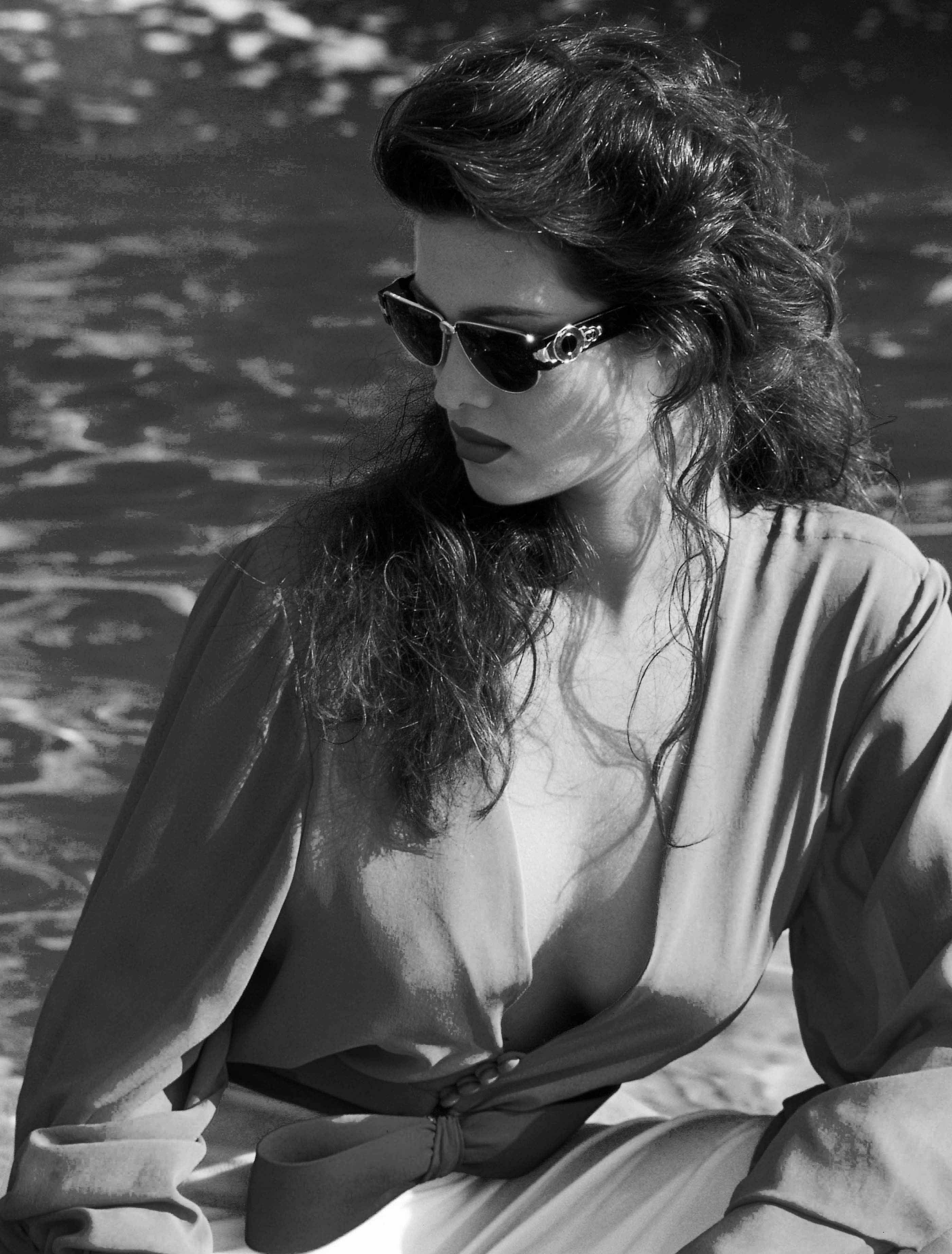
Manuela Arcuri per Marie Claire (1996)

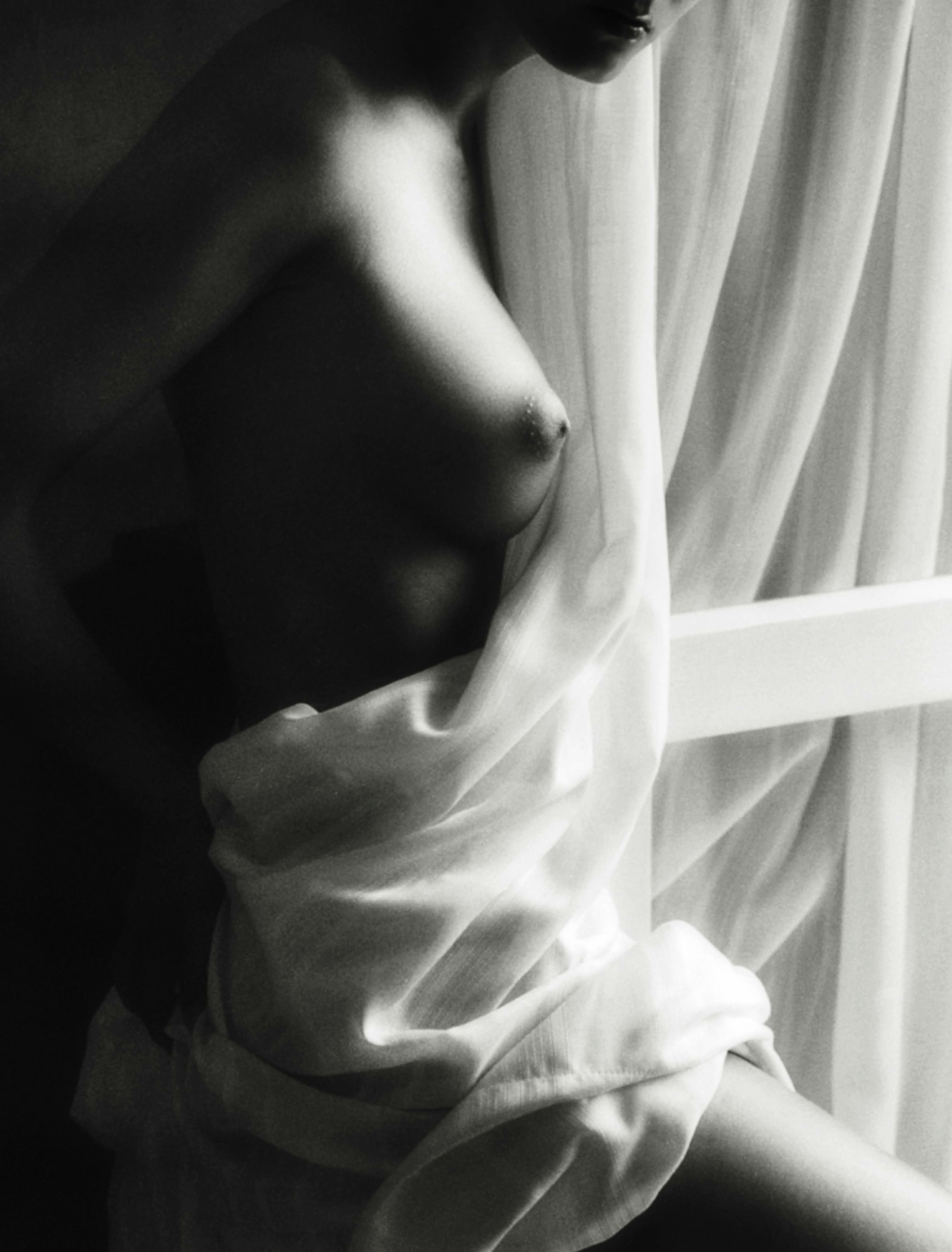
dal libro: Ritratti di vita (2007)

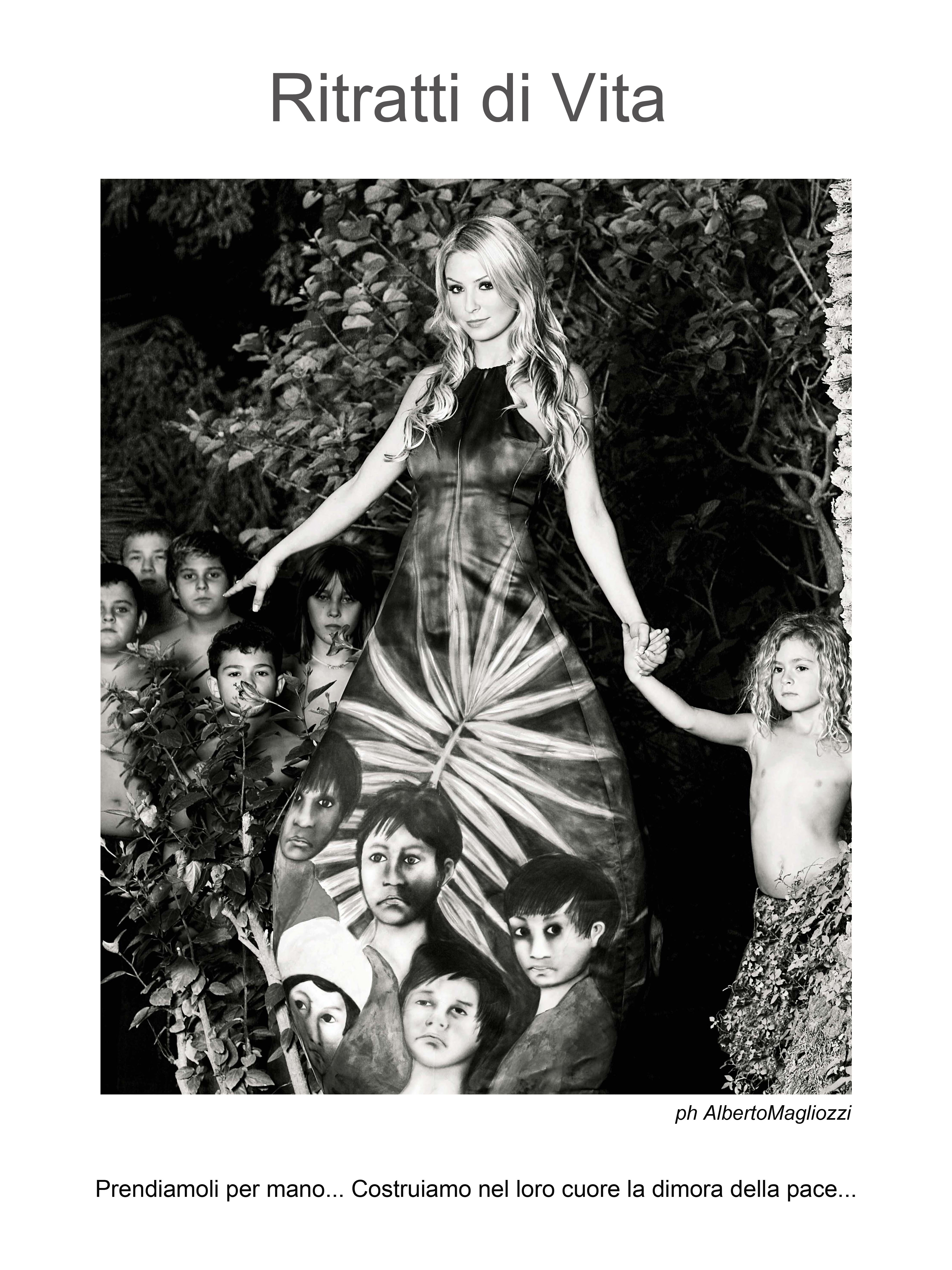
Sabrina Ghio, dal libro: Ritratti di vita (2007)
