= Alice Torriani =

Italian film actor, author and screenwriter (born 1984)

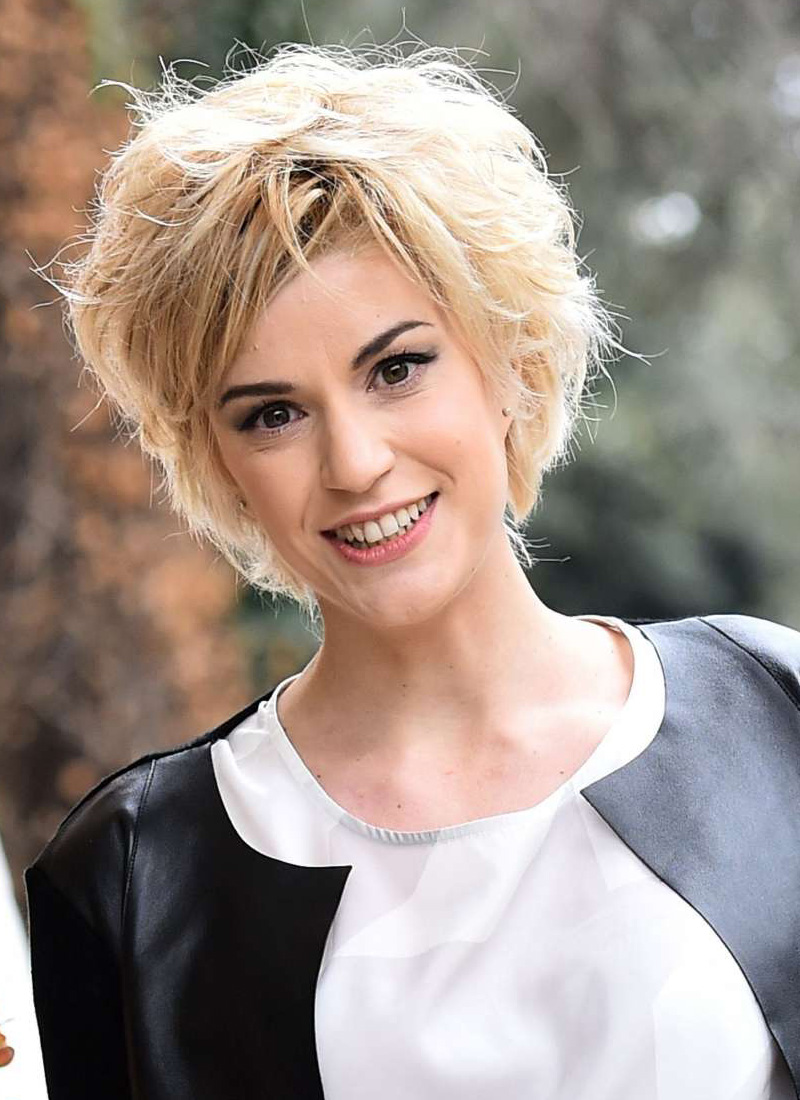
- Born: 25 March 1984 (age 42); Rozzano, Italy
- Education: Paolo Grassi Drama School
- Occupations: Actress, author and screenwriter
- Years active: 2007 – present

Alice Torriani (born 25 March 1984) is an Italian film actor, author and screenwriter. She is notable for her portrayal of Andreina in Il Paradiso delle Signore (Ladies' Paradise) directed by Monica Vullo and as the author of the novel L'altra Sete (A Different Thirst).

== Early life ==
Alice Torriani graduated from the Paolo Grassi Drama School in Milan in 2007 and started theatrical tours in Italy and Europe with Romeo Castellucci, Alvis Hermanis, Massimo Castri, Gabriele Lavia and Franca Valeri, among others.

Torriani graduated from Paolo Grassi Drama School in Milan in 2007, after three years of intense studies. Upon receiving the sought after diploma, Massimo Castri, the critically acclaimed Italian director, cast her as the female lead in Chekhov's Three Sisters. This life-changing part took Torriani on a one-year tour, as she performed in some of the most celebrated theatres across Italy.

When the Italian tour came to an end, it was now renowned director Gabriele Lavia who took a bow, as he too cast Torriani for the female lead part in Dostoyevsky's Memoirs from the House of The Dead.

The Russian writer's imagination, coupled with Lavia's vision, fueled Torriani's quixotic spirit, and just a few months later she landed in Moscow, for the shooting of the film Ten Winters, which went on to win the 2010 David di Donatello prize for Best Debut, as well as the Silver Ribbon for Best First Work at the Venice Film Festival.

During that same year, Torriani started working on the European Project "Prospero", under the guiding hand of Latvian director Alvis Hermanis. Together, they brought The Young Ladies of Wilko, Hermanis's first work with Italian actors, to the stages of Milan, Paris, Venice, Berlin, Lisbon, Moscow, Rennes, Liege, Lotz, and Tampere, in a production spanning two fulfilling years.

== Actor ==
In cinema she made her appearance in Ten Winters by Valerio Mieli (2010 David di Donatello prize for Best Debut), the commercially successful E'nata una star directed by Lucio Pellegrini and based on the novel Not a Star by Nick Hornby, D.A.D. by Marco Maccaferri and Them Who? by Francesco Miccichè and Fabio Bonifaci. She has participated in many 'acting for the stage' workshops with Luca Ronconi, Antonio Latella, and other international directors at the Venice Biennale of Theatre.

In the five-year period encompassing 2009 through 2013, Torriani worked as part of the lead cast for various television shows, and in 2013/2014 she performed the play Visita al padre, directed by Carmelo Rifici, at the Piccolo Teatro di Milano. She has guest-starred in one episode of Montalbano, "A voice of the night", which aired in Italy in 2013.

In 2014, Romeo Castellucci (whose Dante's Divine Comedy the French newspaper Le Monde called "the best play, and one of the ten most influential cultural events in the world for the decade 2000–2010") cast Torriani for the show The Four Season Restaurant, which was performed in Philadelphia in September 2014.

In 2015, Torriani took the second female lead in the Italian TV serial adaptation of The Paradise based on the French novel Au Bonheur des Dames by Emile Zola. The Italian series, produced by RAI, are named Il Paradiso delle Signore and Torriani's role was of Andreina Mandelli, the daughter of an influential banker in Milan.

Just a few months later, Torriani brought her skills to the aid of Franca Valeri, one of Italy's most sought after comedians, as they took the stage together in the play Il cambio dei cavalli, which Valeri penned herself.

Furthermore, in 2016, Torriani took on one of the main roles in the TV series Un Paso dal Ciello, season 4, as Cristina Fabricetti, in a total of 18 episodes.

== Filmography ==
Year	Title	Role	Notes
2009	Ten Winters	Clara	
2010	Alice	Camilla	
2011	Amore 14	Debbie	
2012	E' nata una star	Lorena	
2014	Il Buco	XXX	
2015	Them Who?	Zerbini	
2015–2019	Il paradiso delle signore	Andreina Mandelli	

== Author ==
Torriani's first novel, L'Altra Sete, was published by Fandango Libri in 2015. In 2016 L'Altra Sete was chosen to represent Italy at the Festival Européen du Premier Roman, in Germany. In November, 2018, the novel Una Vita a Posto, authored by Torriani, was published by Fandango Libri.

== Screenwriter ==
In 2015, with Giampiero Judica, she wrote her first screenplay for the TV series Cleaning your Shit, which was filmed in 2017. Torriani played the main role.
