= Giulia Arena =

Italian actress, model and television presenter (born 1994)

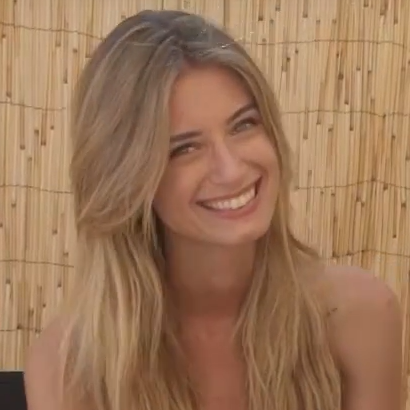
- Arena in 2017
- Born: 22 April 1994 (age 32); Pisa
- Height: 1.70 m (5 ft and 7 in)
- Beauty pageant titleholder
- Title: Miss Italia 2013
- Hair color: Light brown
- Eye color: Green
- Major competition: Miss Italia

Giulia Arena (born 22 April 1994) is an Italian beauty queen, actress, television presenter and model, winner of the 74th edition of Miss Italia 2013.

== Biography ==
She was born in Pisa but soon she moved to Messina, Sicily, her parents' city of origin. In 2013 she participated in the Miss Italia beauty contest with the band of "Miss Cinema Planter's Sicilia", being elected winner; she was also elected Miss Cinema. She is the first Miss Italia to have been elected live on La7, as well as the first Miss Italia to be elected in Jesolo after Salsomaggiore Terme was abandoned as its headquarters. Giulia Arena was the tenth Miss Italia from Sicily. At the time of the victory, she was still a student of faculty of Jurisprudence of Università Cattolica del Sacro Cuore.

In 2014 she made her debut as a TV presenter presenting on LA7 two editions of the program Mode e modi and one of Mode e modi - Food together with Andy Luotto. In the spring of 2015 she was entrusted with the management of the culinary program Gustibus. In the spring of 2017 she moved to Rai 4, where she presented the television program Kudos - Tutto Pass dal web, together with Leonardo Decarli and Diletta Parlangeli.

== Filmography ==
Film roles
Title	Year	Role
Il paradiso delle signore	2018	Ludovica Brancia Di Montalto
Bella da morire	2020	Gioia Scuderi
