= Elenoire Casalegno =

Italian television presenter (born 1976)

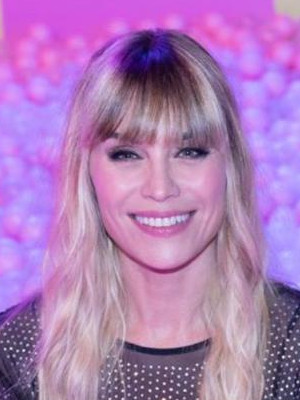
- Casalegno in 2023
- Born: 28 May 1976 (age 50); Savona, Liguria, Italy
- Occupations: Model; television resenter
- Years active: 1994–present
- Spouse: Sebastiano Lombardi (m. 2014; div. 2017)
- Children: 1

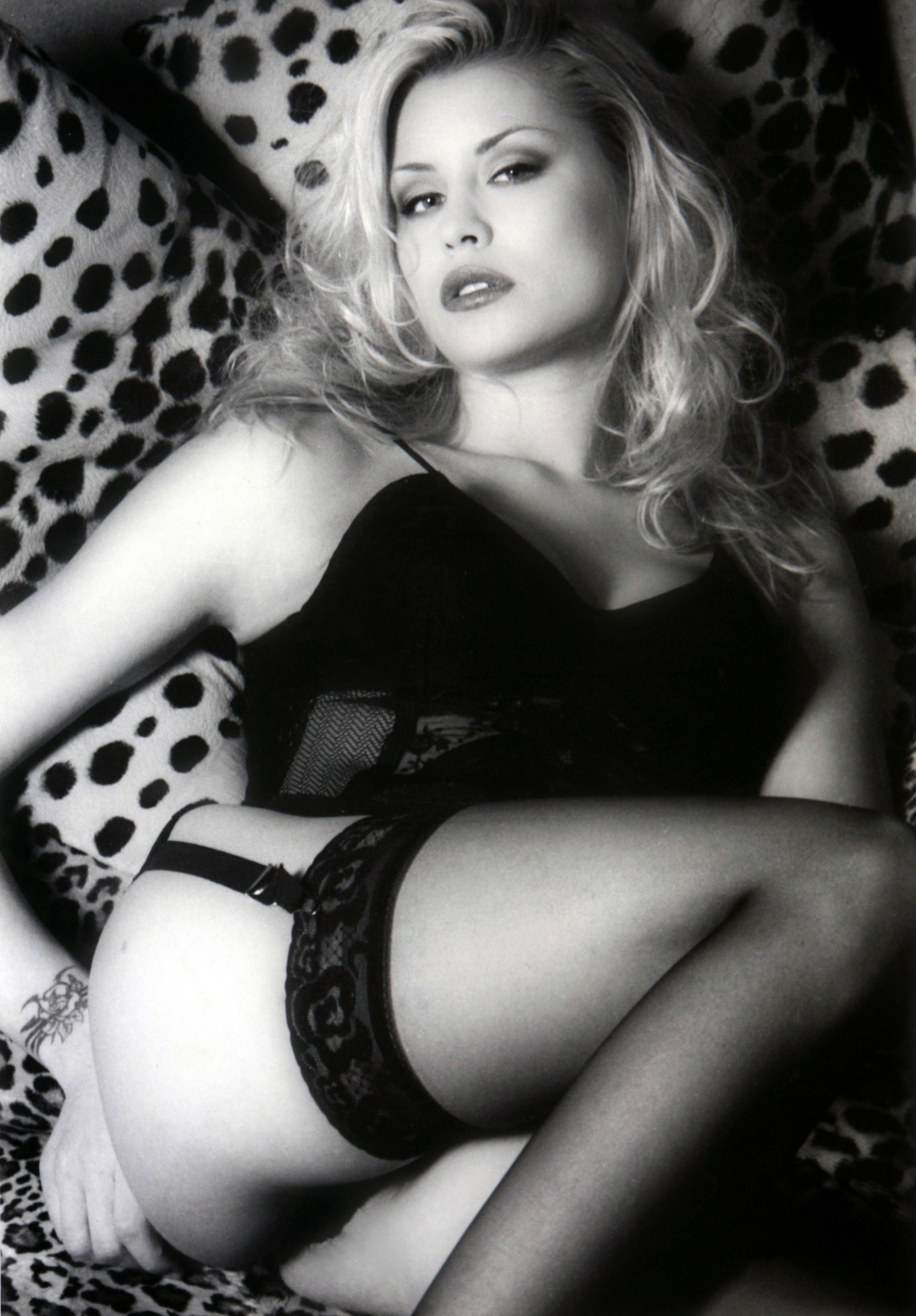
Casalegno photographed by Alberto Magliozzi in 1997

Elenoire Casalegno (pronounced [eleˈnwar kazaˈleɲɲo]; born 28 May 1976) is an Italian television presenter and former model.

== Life and career ==
Born in Savona, Liguria, Casalegno started her career in 1994, at 17 years old, as a runway model. In 1994, after winning the beauty contest Look of the Year, she debuted as television presenter of the Italia 1 musical show Jammin'. During her career, Casalegno hosted several programs, including the sport talk show Pressing, alongside Raimondo Vianello, the variety show Scherzi a parte and the 1998 edition of Festivalbar. As an actress, she played Poppaea Sabina in the 1998 sitcom S.P.Q.R. aired by Italia 1.
