= Ten Winters =

- Directed by: Valerio Mieli
- Starring: Isabella Ragonese; Michele Riondino
- Cinematography: Marco Onorato
- Release date: 2009
- Language: Italian

Ten Winters (Italian: Dieci inverni) is a 2009 Italian romance film directed by Valerio Mieli. It is based on the novel with the same title written by Mieli himself. The film premiered at the 66th Venice International Film Festival. For this film Mieli won the David di Donatello for Best New Director and the Nastro d'Argento in the same category.

== Cast ==
- Isabella Ragonese as Camilla
- Michele Riondino as Silvestro
- Glen Blackhall as Simone
- Sergey Zhigunov as Fjodor
- Sergei Nikonenko as the professor
- Ljuba Zaiceva as Ljuba
- Sara Lazzaro as Maria Antonietta
- Alice Torriani as Clara
- Roberto Nobile as Camilla's father
- Luis Molteni as the doctor
- Vinicio Capossela as the singer
