= Gloria Radulescu =

Italian actress

- Born: 25 September 1991 (age 34); Rome, Italy
- Occupation: Actress
- Years active: 2015–present

Gloria Radulescu (born 25 September 1991) is an Italian actress.

== Early life and career ==
Born premature, in Rome to a Romanian father and an Italian mother, Gloria spent her youth in the town of Corato due to a respiratory crisis at the age of two and a half, caused by smog-induced asthma. She attends the liceo artistico Federico II where she obtains a qualification as a goldsmith's art teacher.

In 2012 she participated in the 73rd edition of Miss Italia (one of the eight Apulian finalists) with the band n.36 “Miss Eleganza Silvian Heach Puglia”, ranking among the top ten.

In 2013 she graduated from the acting and diction center Teatrificio 22, while the following year she enrolled at the Rome Centro Sperimentale di Cinematografia, graduating in 2016.

In 2018, after some appearances in TV series (including the regular presence in the first season of Non dirlo al mio capo and in the fourth one of Le tre rose di Eva), she gets the role of Marta Guarnieri, a young heiress of the 60s in the soap opera Il paradiso delle signore.

== Filmography ==
=== Films and television ===
Year	Title	Role(s)	Notes
2015	Provaci ancora prof!	Doina	Episode: "L'ultima litigata"
2015	Un passo dal cielo	Letizia	Episode: "Aliloke"
2015	Il candidato	Sexy girl	Episode: "La premierina"
2016	Non dirlo al mio capo	Claudia Tagliacozzo	Main role (season 1)
2017–2018	Le tre rose di Eva	Fiamma Astori	Main role (season 4)
2018	Don Matteo	Lina	Episode: "Lina's Got Talent"
2018–present	Il paradiso delle signore	Marta Guarnieri	Main role
2019	Beware the Gorilla	Trapez artist	Film debut; cameo
