= Stefania Orlando =

Italian actress, showgirl, television presenter and singer

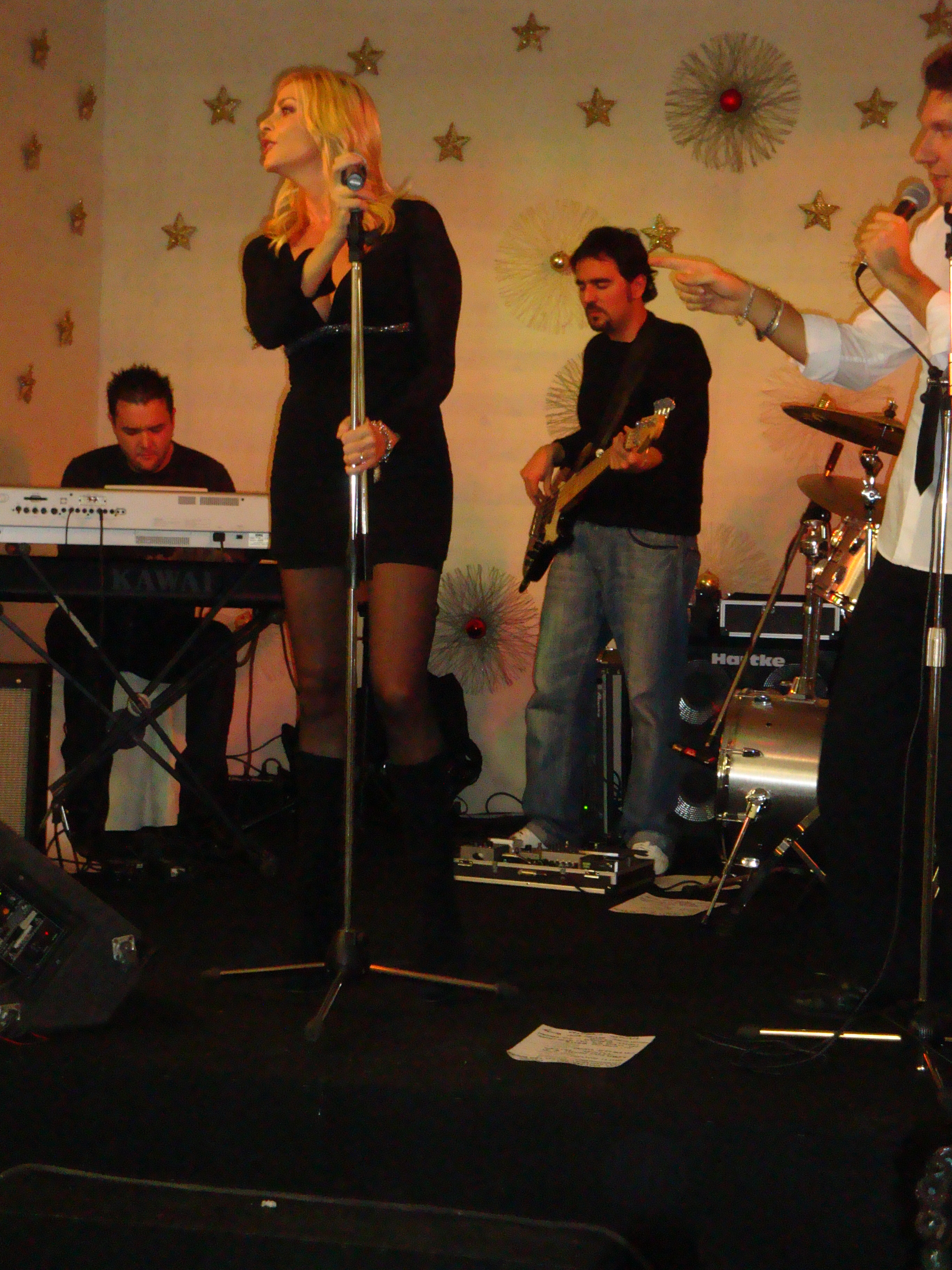
- Born: 23 December 1966 (age 59); Rome, Italy
- Occupations: Showgirl, television personality and singer
- Years active: 1992–present
- Height: 178 cm (5 ft 10 in)
- Website: www.stefaniaorlando.it

Stefania Orlando (born 23 December 1966) is an Italian showgirl, television personality and singer.

She debuted in 1993 as a showgirl for the Mediaset quiz Sì o No?, and later appeared on the morning show of Rai 2 I fatti vostri from 1997 to 2003. She considers herself Catholic.

== Television ==
- Sì o no? (Canale 5, 1993–1994)
- Scommettiamo che...? (Rai 1, 1994–1995)
- TG Rosa (Odeon TV, 1995–1997)
- Il Boom (Canale 5, 1996)
- Retromarsh (Telemontecarlo, 1996–1997)
- I fatti vostri (Rai 2, 1997–2000, 2001–2003, 2015–2017) - talent show judge for Dog Factor
- Telethon (Rai 1, 1997–2000)
- Il lotto alle otto (Rai 2, 1998–2005, 2010)
- Torno sabato (Rai 1, 2002) – Reporter
- Girofestival (Rai 3, 2002–2003)
- Uno di noi (Rai 1, 2003) – Reporter
- Piazza grande (Rai 2, 2003–2004)
- Stelle con la coda (Rai 2, 2004)
- Cantagiro (Rai 2, 2005)
- Festival Show (Canale Italia, 2008)
- Unomattina in famiglia (Rai 1, Dal 2011 – 2020) - Columnist
- Cantando ballando (Canale Italia, 2015–2016)
- Buon pomeriggio Estate (Telenorba, TG Norba 24, 2017)
- Buon pomeriggio (Telenorba, TG Norba 24, 2017)
- Miss Europe Continental – Finale nazionale Italia (Canale Italia, 2018)
- Grande Fratello VIP (Canale 5, 2020) – Contestant

== Filmography ==
- Fantozzi 2000 - La clonazione, directed by Domenico Saverni (1999) – Cameo
- Don Matteo – TV show, episode 6x03 (2008)
- https://it.wikipedia.org/wiki/Nuovo_ordine_mondiale_(film), directed by Fabio Ferrara and Marco Ferrara (2015)
- Il paradiso delle signore – Soap (2019)

== Theatre ==
- Isso, esso e 'a Mala Femmena, directed by Vittorio Marsiglia (1995–1996)
- Ragioné voi dovete ragionà, directed by Vittorio Marsiglia (1996–1997)

== Discography ==
=== Album ===
- 2009 – Su e giù

=== Singles ===
- 2007 – Sotto la luna
- 2008 – Marimbabà
- 2009 – Su e giù
- 2011 – Crazy Dance
- 2011 – A Troia
- 2012 – Frappé
- 2012 – Vita bastarda
- 2013 – Omologazione
- 2014 – Favola (Fernando Alba feat. Stefania Orlando)
- 2015 – Legami al Letto
- 2016 – Prima di lunedì (Fernando Alba feat. Stefania Orlando)
- 2020 – Babilonia
- 2021 – Bandolero

=== Music Videos ===
- 2011 – Marimbabà
- 2011 – Crazy Dance
- 2011 – Sotto la luna
- 2011 – A Troia
- 2012 – A Troia Remix
- 2012 – Frappé
- 2012 – Vita bastarda
- 2013 – Omologazione
- 2014 – Favola
- 2015 – Legami al letto
- 2016 – Kiss
- 2016 – Prima di lunedì
