= Valerio Mieli =

Italian writer, screenwriter and film director

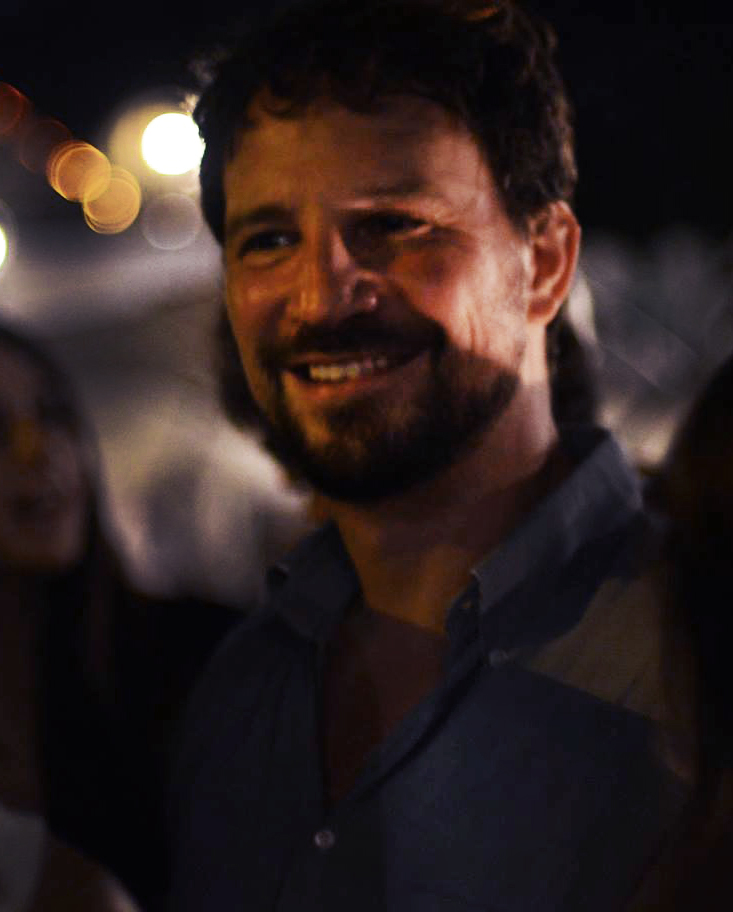
- Valerio Mieli in 2018.
- Born: 27 January 1978 (age 48); Rome, Italy
- Occupations: Film director, screenwriter

Valerio Mieli (born 27 January 1978, Rome, Latium) is a French-Italian writer, director and scenarist.

== Biography ==
After a master of philosophy at the University of Rome (« La Sapienza »), he studied at the Columbia University and the University of Eastern Piedmont « Amedeo-Avogadro ». He obtained a diploma of direction at the Centro sperimentale di cinematografia. He is a member of the Accademia del cinema italiano, of the European Film Academy and of the jury for first film at the Rome Film Festival. He lives between Rome and Paris.

In 2009, he published a novel, Ten Winters, (Rizzoli editions).

He wins the David di Donatello of the best beginning director and the Nastri d'argento of the best beginning director with Ten Winters, adaptation of his novel for which he signed the direction and the scenario. The movie is presented at the Mostra de Venise and the Tokyo International Film Festival, before his launching in France in 2012. The movie was sold in Germany, Scandinavia, Australia, Asia and South America. He participated to 93 festivals and won 18 prizes.

In 2013, la Casa del cinema welcomed his first exhibition of photography.

== Filmography ==
=== director and scenarist ===
- 2010 : Ten Winters (Dieci inverni)
- 2018 : Remember? (Ricordi?)

== Books ==
=== Novels ===
- Dieci inverni (2009)

== Prizes ans awards ==
- David di Donatello for Best New Director, 2010 for Ten Winters.
- Nastro d'Argento for Best New Director, 2010 for Ten Winters.
