= The Ladies' Paradise (TV series) =

Italian period drama television series

- Italian poster
- Italian: Il paradiso delle signore
- Genre: Period drama; Romance; Soap opera
- Country of origin: Italy
- Original language: Italian
- No. of seasons: 11
- No. of episodes: 1413

Production
- Executive producer: Giannandrea Pecorelli
- Production locations: Milan, Italy
- Running time: 50 min (2015–2017); 40 min (2018–present)
- Production companies: Rai Fiction; Aurora TV

Original release
- Network: Rai 1; Rai Premium (rerun)
- Release: December 8, 2015 – present

The Ladies' Paradise (also known as Paradise; Italian: Il paradiso delle signore) is an Italian period drama television series on RAI Italian television, loosely based on the 1883 novel Au bonheur des dames by Émile Zola. The series focuses on the lives of the owner and workers of a department store based in Milan.

== Cast and characters ==
- Giuseppe Zeno as Pietro Mori
- Giusy Buscemi as Teresa Iorio
- Alessandro Tersigni as Vittorio Conti
- Christiane Filangieri as Clara Mantovani
- Lorena Cacciatore as Lucia Gritti
- Giulia Vecchio as Anna Imbriani
- Silvia Mazzieri as Silvana Maffeis
- Corrado Tedeschi as Carlo Mandelli
- Alice Torriani as Andreina Mandelli
- Helene Nardini as Marina Mandelli
- Andrea Pennacchi as Ezio Galli
- Riccardo Leonelli as Federico Cazzaniga
- Alessandro Averone as Bruno Jacobi
- Filippo Scarafia as Roberto Landi
- Claudia Vismara as Elsa Tadini
- Marco Bonini as Corrado Colombo
- Cristiano Caccamo as Quinto Reggiani
- Margherita Laterza as Monica Giuliani
- Valeria Fabrizi as Contessa
- Antonio Milo as Giuseppe Iorio
- Alessia Giuliani as Francesca Iorio
- Fabrizio Ferracane as Vincenzo Iorio
- Andrea Arcangeli as Mario Iorio
- Giorgio Capitani as Monsignor Razzi
- Francesca Valtorta as Valeria Craveri
- Paolo Bovani as Massimo
- Guenda Goria as Violetta
- Roberto Farnesi as Umberto Guarnieri
- Vanessa Gravina as Adelaide di Sant'Erasmo
- Gloria Radulescu as Marta Guarnieri
- Enrico Oetiker as Riccardo Guarnieri
- Francesco Maccarinelli as Luca Spinelli/Daniele Fonseca
- Giorgio Lupano as Luciano Cattaneo
- Marta Richeldi as Silvia Cattaneo
- Federica Girardello as Nicoletta Cattaneo
- Alessandro Fella as Federico Cattaneo
- Enrica Pintore as Clelia Calligaris/Clelia Bacchini
- Antonella Attili as Agnese Amato
- Giulio Maria Corso as Antonio Amato
- Neva Leoni as Concetta "Tina" Amato
- Emanuel Caserio as Salvatore "Salvo" Amato
- Giancarlo Commare as Rocco Amato
- Giulia Petrungaro as Elena Montemurro
- Federica De Benedittis as Roberta Pellegrino
- Ilaria Rossi as Gabriella Rossi
- Francesca Del Fa as Irene Cipriani
- Giulia Arena as Ludovica Brancia Di Montalto
- Lara Komar as Gloria Moreau / Colombo
- Grace Ambrose as Stefania Colombo
- Massimo Poggio as Ezio Colombo
- Valentina Bartolo as Veronica Zanatta
- Gaia Bavaro as Gemma Zanatta
- Sara Ricci as Anita Marini
- Desirée Noferini as Lisa Conterno/Ada Manetti
- Luca Capuano as Sandro Recalcati
- Michele Cesari as Cesare Diamante
- Jgor Barbazza as Oscar Bacchini
- Gaia Messerklinger as Nora Vitali, in arte Lydia Stanton
- Chanel Cazzaniga as Monica Astolfi
- Gianluca Ferrato as Stanton
- Andrea Osvárt as Rose Anderson

== Episodes ==
Season	Episodes	Originally released	
Season	Episodes	First released	Last released
1	10	December 8, 2015	January 26, 2016
2	10	September 11, 2017	November 7, 2017
3	10	September 10, 2018	May 17, 2019
4	10	October 14, 2019	October 9, 2020
5	10	October 12, 2020	May 28, 2021
6	10	September 13, 2021	April 29, 2022
7	10	September 12, 2022	May 5, 2023
8	10	September 11, 2023	May 3, 2024
9	10	September 9, 2024	May 5, 2025
10	10	September 8, 2025	May 22, 2026
11	11	September 7, 2026	May 21, 2027
