= Leone Di Lernia =

Italian comedian, singer and radio host (1938–2017)

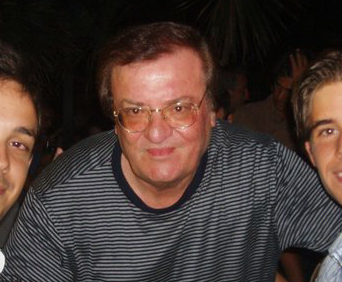

Background information
- Born: Leone Di Lernia; 18 April 1938; Trani, Italy
- Died: 28 February 2017 (aged 78) Milan, Italy
- Genres: Trash, pop, rock
- Years active: 1968–2017
- Label: Duck Records

Leone Di Lernia (18 April 1938 – 28 February 2017) was an Italian radio host, singer, and composer of the genre trash-demented. He gained popularity in the early nineties, thanks to the cover of parodic goliardic and often scurrilous songs of dance music. He had been for almost fifteen years (1999 to 2008 and again, even if partially, from 2011 to 2016) the comic shoulder of the radio programme Lo Zoo di 105 on Radio 105 Network.

== Biography ==
=== Early career ===
Born in Trani, a city in the province of Bari, at 30 years old he recorded his first single, Trenta chili/Andiamo nei cieli. After moving to Milan, he has worked extensively as a dialect singer and comic in various local TV stations. In 1975, he released his second single, Gaccia ad'avè/Spuosatiella Geuvè. In particular, "Gaccia ad'avè", covered in the Bari dialect of the famous "I gotcha" by Joe Tex, anticipates what will be the modus operandi of the Apulian singer in the nineties: make an English song of success and replace its text with text demented in Italian or in Apulian. In later years, he published several albums, both as the "Leone Di Lernia and his new rock band", and as a soloist. Most of these records were published by Duck Records, a small label of Trezzano sul Naviglio, but were not particularly successful with the public.

=== The Success ===
In the 1990s, the popularity finally arrived at the national level through participation in the programme at Radio Monte Carlo "Fausto Terenzi Show" along with Fausto Terenzi, Paolo Dini, and the two discs in the series Barhouse, in which to be reinterpreted in his usual mix are the dancefloor hits of the moment. Examples of his cover of this period are “Ra ri ri ra ra ra, pesce fritto e baccalà” (“Gypsy woman”), “Magnando” (“Bailando”), “Chille che soffre” (“Killing me softly”), “Tu sei ignorante” (“Zombie”), “Uè paparul maccaron” (“Pump up the jam”), “Te sì mangiàte la banana” (“The Rhythm of the Night”), "Melanzan" ("Turn Around").

=== Radio 105 Network ===
In 1999, he began working as a comic shoulder to the radio programme Lo Zoo di 105 on Radio 105 Network, conducted by Marco Mazzoli, Fabio Alisei, Pippo Palmieri, Mago Wender, Paolo Noise and DJ Gibba. Leone, in addition to broadcasting his songs, he also performs in skits, spoken, making many of his catchphrases true exclamations. On 3 April 2008, he was suspended indefinitely from the program for unruly behavior, but re-admitted into the programme the day after; since July 2008 he continued to attend occasionally to direct the zoo and the sketches of the program, but his appearances were often due to the absence of some component of the programme. His presence, in part, in the Lo Zoo di 105 is confirmed in the new edition in 2011, with the new team formed by Marco Mazzoli, DJ Gibba, Pippo Palmieri, Alan Caligiuri, Marcello Macchia, Enrico Venti, Luigi Luciano and Dj Spine. From 6 December 2008 to December 2011, led with Ylenia Baccaro and Max Brigante the radio programme 105 Non Stop, replaced in January 2012 by Daniele Battaglia. In May 2012, every Saturday lead Leo D'Ylenia with Ylenia Baccaro.

== Personal life ==
He moved to Milan from Trani, and he married Nenna Rosa at a young age. He had one daughter and three sons: Elena, Savino (called RickyOne), Marco, and Davide. Leone Di Lernia lived in the neighborhood of Gratosoglio on the southern outskirts of Milan.

== Discography ==
=== Singles ===
- 1968 - Trenta chili/Andiamo nei cieli
- 1975 - Gaccia ad'avè/Spuosatiella Geuvè
- 1977 - Gaccia a te Mariuo'/U fesse 'nnamerate
- 1979 - Sfregamece/Vieni fuori
- 1983 - Padron pensaci tu/Spremi spremi
- 1989 - Ce cule ca tiene (Rap italiano)/Ce cule ca tiene (Rap pugliese)
- 1991 - La la li - la la la pesce fritto e baccalà/Bar house
- 1991 - Lasciame ste' (How gee)/Tu sì scemo
- 1992 - La fatica non m'ingozza (Club mix)/La fatica non m'ingozza (Radio edit)
- 1992 - Tu sì pazze (Rhythm is a dancer)/Chi ruba (Sex machine)
- 1993 - Disco Hauz
- 1994 - Salut'm a Sord/Voglio fare tanti soldi
- 1995 - Think about the way (Pippo Baudo Uè)/Lapuglia Blues
- 1997 - Cio'...Los...Tress

=== Albums ===
As Leone Di Lernia and his new rock band:

- Leone Di Lernia e la sua new rock band - Canzoni rock tranesi (1975)
- Leone Di Lernia e la sua new rock band (1976)
- Leone Di Lernia e la sua new rock band (1977)

As Leone Di Lernia

- La pugliata (1979)
- MotorLover - Il rock del re delle puglie (1980)
- Padron pensaci tu (1983)
- Disco (1984)
- Americanpuglia (1984)
- Compilation - I successi di Leone Di Lernia (1984)
- Barhouse Music (1990)
- Barhouse Music 2 (1991)
- Gran Barhouse - Il meglio di... Leone Di Lernia (1991)
- Leone Super Dance (1992)
- Disco Hauz (1993)
- Il (meglio) peggio di Leone Di Lernia (1993)
- Leonemania (1994)
- Salut'm a Sord (1994)
- Leonlatino (1996)
- SuperLeone - Cio'...Los...Tress (1997)
- Fesso... e tutto il resto (1997)
- Re Leone Di Lernia (1998)
- Leonestate (1998)
- Leone superstar - I grandi successi di Leone Di Lernia (1999)
- Giubileone (2000)
- Leone 2000 (2000)
- Il Gran Porcello (2001)
- Zizzaniaman (2002)
- Porcello 2 - Il ritorno (2002)
- Zizzaniaman 2 + Il meglio dello zoo di 105 (2003)
- The Best of the Bestia - Trash compilation (2004)
- Un Leone su Marte (2004)
- Sfigato (2004)
- Leone D'oro - Il peggio di Leone Di Lernia (2005)
- Casa di Lernia (2006)
- Ma che figo sono con Auz Triccaballac (2006)
- L'isola dei leoni (2006)
- Squich (2007)
- Si nu baccalà (2007)
- Leone Best 2008 (2008)
- Leone Di Lernia contro tutti (2009)
- Fuori o dentro lo zoo? (2010)
- Il presidente querela forte (2011)
- Eccitato (2012)
- Capra (2013)
- Tutto Leone Di Lernia: 40 successi (2013)
- Perché son gay (2014)
- EXPO (2015)

== Filmography ==
- Mario (2014)
- On Air: Storia di un successo (2016)
