= Alessio Saro =

Italian actor and comedian

- Born: Alessio Saro; 30 May 1975 (age 51); Milan, Lombardy, Italy
- Occupations: Actor, Comedian
- Years active: 2003–present

Alessio Saro (born 30 May 1975), also known with the name of Billy Ballo and Nick Malanno, is an Italian actor and comedian. He worked in Shortcut Production performing in comedy sketches with Marcello Macchia, Enrico Venti, Luigi Luciano and Franco Mari. In May 2009 he was arrested for statutory rape and sentenced to four months in prison.

== Filmography ==
=== TV Series ===
- Intralci, (2006)
- La Villa di Lato, (2009)
- Drammi Medicali, (2009)
