= L'isola dei famosi season 17 =

L'isola dei famosi
- Season 17
- Presented by: Ilary Blasi (in the studio); Alvin (from the island)
- No. of days: 64
- No. of castaways: 18
- Winner: Marco Mazzoli
- Runner-up: Luca Vetrone
- Location: Cayos Cochinos, Honduras
- No. of episodes: 10

Release
- Original network: Canale 5
- Original release: April 17 – June 19, 2023

Season chronology
- ← Previous; Season 16

L'isola dei famosi 17 is the seventeenth season of the reality television L'isola dei famosi and the Italian version of the reality show franchise Survivor, broadcast in prime time on Canale 5 from 17 April 2023. This is the eighth consecutive edition broadcast by Mediaset, with Ilary Blasi presenting for the third consecutive year, flanked in the studio by commentators Enrico Papi and Vladimir Luxuria, and with participation of the envoy Alvin. It lasts 64 days, has 17 castaways and 10 episodes and is held in Cayos Cochinos (Honduras). The motto of this edition is L'isola dei famosi 2023: Il meglio ancora deve venire.

The stories of the castaways are broadcast by Canale 5 every Monday in prime time (with the exception of the third episode, broadcast on Tuesdays), while the broadcast of the daily strips in the day-time is entrusted to Canale 5 from Monday to Friday. Furthermore, on La5 and on Mediaset Extra (from Monday to Friday) the day-time is broadcast with the addition of unpublished material with the title of L'isola dei famosi - Extended Edition, the duration of which is 185 minutes.

== Contestants ==
The age of the contestants refers to the time of landing on the island.

Contestant	Age	Profession	Birthplace	Day entered	Day exited	Status
Marco Mazzoli	50	Radio host	Milan	1	64	Winner
Luca Vetrone	28	Personal trainer, model, influencer	Benevento	1	64	Runner-up
Andrea Lo Cicero	46	TV presenter, former rugby player	Catania	1	64	3rd Place
Pamela Camassa	38	Former model, TV personality	Prato	1	64	4th Place
Alessandra Drusian	53	Singer, member of the musical duo Jalisse	Oderzo	1	64	5th Place
Cristina Scuccia	34	Singer, TV personality	Vittoria, Sicily	1	64	6th Place
Nathaly Caldonazzo	53	Actress, showgirl, TV personality	Rome	1	61	6th Eliminated
Gian Maria Sainato	28	Influencer, model	Sapri	16	61	5th Eliminated
Helena Prestes	32	Model, stylist	São Paulo, Brazil	1	61	4th Eliminated
Fabio Ricci	57	Singer, member of the musical duo Jalisse	Rome	1	50	3rd Eliminated
Corinne Cléry	73	Actress	Paris, France	1	43	2nd Eliminated
Christopher Leoni	36	Actor, model	São Paulo, Brazil	1	36	1st Eliminated
Paolo Noise	48	Radio host, record producer	Milan	1	36	Walked
Fiore Argento	53	Actress, stylist	Rome	1	29	Walked
Alessandro Cecchi Paone	61	Journalist, TV presenter, TV personality	Rome	1	25	Walked
Simone Antolini	23	University student, boyfriend of Alessandro Cecchi Paone	Ascoli Piceno	1	25	Walked
Marco Predolin	72	TV presenter, radio host	Borgo Val di Taro	1	16	Walked
Claudia Motta	23	Influencer, model	Velletri	1	16	Walked

=== Would-be castaways ===
Contestant	Age	Category	Profession	Birthplace	Day entered	Day exited	Status
Luca Vetrone	28	Bonitos	Personal trainer, model, influencer	Benevento	1		Join the game
Jhonatan Andres Mujica Carrillo	27	Bonitos	Model, influencer	Caracas, Venezuela	1		Rejected

== Nominations table ==
Legend

Leader: the contestant is the challenge winner / part of the winning duo and immune; they have to pick a contestant / duo that will be directly nominated
The contestant is immune
New/returning contestant immune from nominations

	Week 1	Week 2	Week 3	Week 4	Week 5	Week 6	Week 7	Week 8	Week 9	Week 10	Nominations received
Leader	Alessandro & Simone	Andrea									Nominations received
Alessandra	Christopher	Nathaly									
Fabio	Christopher	Nathaly									
Alessandro	Helena	Helena									
Simone	Helena	Helena									
Andrea	Fiore	Fiore									
Christopher	Nathaly	Nathaly									
Claudia	Predolin	Nathaly									
Pamela	Predolin	Nathaly									
Corinne	Predolin	Alessandra & Fabio									
Cristina	Christopher	Alessandro & Simone									
Fiore	Predolin	Alessandro & Simone									
Helena	Predolin	Alessandro & Simone									
Luca	Fiore	Fiore									
Mazzoli	Fiore	Nathaly									
Paolo	Fiore	Nathaly									
Nathaly	Christopher	Alessandro & Simone									
Predolin	Nathaly	Isola di Sant'Elena									
Nominated by Tribe	Predolin	Alessandro & Simone; Nathaly									
Nominated by Leader	Helena	Fiore									
Nominated due to a challenge / twist											
Eliminated	Predolin; 37.1% to save	?? ??% to save	?? ??% to save	?? ??% to save	?? ??% to save	?? ??% to save	?? ??% to save	?? ??% to save	?? ??% to save	?? ??% to save	
Nomination for Entry	Luca; 67% to enter the game										
Nomination for Entry	Jhonatan; 33% to enter the game										

=== Notes ===
- Day 1: Seventeen contestants entered the game, which are all divided into three tribes: the Accopiados Tribe, the Hombres Tribe and the Chicas Tribe. Alessandro and Simone become leaders after the latter wins the test.

== Guests ==
Episode	Date	Guests
1	April 17, 2023	Fabio Alisei, Angelica Ricci, Cristina Espinosa Navarro, Lina Rizzi, Marco Balestri, Simone Morandi (Simon & The Stars)
2	April 24, 2023	Fabio Alisei, Luca Gervaso, Lina Rizzi, Osilide and Angelica Ricci, Laura Predolin
3	May 2, 2023	Fabio Alisei, Carlo Motta, Roberta Lo Cicero
4	May 8, 2023	Fabio Alisei, Carlo Motta, Luca Diana, Aneglica Ricci
5	May 15, 2023	Fabio Alisei, Angelica Ricci, Asia Argento, Alessandro Cecchi Paone, Simone Antolini, Claudia Motta
6	May 22, 2023	Christian Totti, Melissa Monti, Leontine Snell
7	May 29, 2023	Fabio Alisei, Carlo Motta, Tonia Picca
8	June 5, 2023	Fabio Alisei, Angelica Ricci, Tonia Picca, Claudio Mazzoli
Semifinal	June 16, 2023	Carlo Motta
Final	June 19, 2023	Carlo Motta, Roberta Di Fiore, Giuseppe Vetrone, Stefania Caroli, Chanel Totti, Cristian Babalus, Aurora Ricci

== TV Ratings ==
Episode	Date	Viewers	Share
1	April 17, 2023	2,919,000	23.33%
2	April 24, 2023	2,983,000	22.50%
3	May 2, 2023	2,383,000	16.99%
4	May 8, 2023	2,640,000	19,63%
5	May 15, 2023	2,504,000	18,30%
6	May 22, 2023	2,530,000	18,68%
7	May 29, 2023	2,446,000	18,55%
8	June 5, 2023	2,388,000	19,53%
Semifinal	June 16, 2023	1,977,000	16,54%
Final	June 19, 2023	2,378,000	21,10%
Average		2,515,000	19,51%
