= L'isola dei famosi season 14 =

L'isola dei famosi
- Season 14
- Presented by: Alessia Marcuzzi (in the studio); Alvin (from the island)
- No. of days: 68
- No. of castaways: 23
- Winner: Marco Maddaloni
- Runner-up: Marina La Rosa
- Location: Cayos Cochinos, Honduras
- No. of episodes: 12

Release
- Original network: Canale 5
- Original release: January 24 – April 1, 2019

Season chronology
- ← Previous; Season 13 Next → Season 15

L'isola dei famosi 14 is the fourteenth season of the reality television show L'isola dei famosi and the Italian version of the reality show franchise Survivor, which aired in prime time on Canale 5 from 24 January to 1 April 2019. It was the fifth edition broadcast by Mediaset, with Alessia Marcuzzi conducting for the fifth and last consecutive year, flanked in the studio by the columnists Alda D'Eusanio and Alba Parietti and Gialappa's Band in connection, and with the participation of the correspondent Alvin (a role he had already covered in the tenth and eleventh edition). It lasted 68 days, had 23 castaways and 12 episodes and was held in Cayos Cochinos (Honduras). The motto of this edition was Che la forza dell'isola sia con voi!.

The stories of the castaways were broadcast by Canale 5 in prime time with variations on Thursday evenings (only the first two episodes), Sunday (episodes 3-4), Wednesday (episodes 5-7) and Monday (episodes 8-12), while the transmission of the daily strips in the day-time was entrusted to Canale 5 and Italia 1 from Monday to Friday. Additional day-time broadcasts titled L'isola dei famosi – Extended Edition aired on La5 and Mediaset Extra, and contained previously unpublished material which lengthened episode durations to between 175 and 180 minutes.

The edition ended with the victory of Marco Maddaloni, who was awarded the prize money of €100,000.

== Contestants ==
The age of the contestants refers to the time of landing on the island.

Contestant	Age	Profession	Birthplace	Day entered	Day exited	Status
Marco Maddaloni	34	Judoka, TV personality	Naples	1	68	Winner
Marina La Rosa	42	Actress, TV personality	Messina	1	68	Runner-up
Luca Vismara	27	Singer	Monza	1	68	3rd Place
Sarah Altobello	31	Showgirl	Modugno	1	68	4th Place
Aaron Meyer Nielsen	25	Model	Mendrisio, Ticino, Switzerland	1	68	5th Place
Soleil Sorge	24	Model, TV personality	Los Angeles, California, United States	18	61	13th Eliminated
Stefano Bettarini	46	Former footballer, TV personality	Forlì	11	61	12th Eliminated
Kaspar Capparoni	54	Actor	Rome	1	61	11th Eliminated
Riccardo Fogli	71	Songwriter	Pontedera	1	61	10th Eliminated
Paolo Brosio	62	Journalist, writer, former TV presenter	Asti	1	54	9th Eliminated
Ariadna Romero	32	Model, actress	Fomento, Sancti Spíritus, Cuba	21	47	8th Eliminated
Abdelkader Ghezzal	34	Sports agent, former footballer	Décines-Charpieu, Auvergne-Rhône-Alpes, France	1	44	Walked
Jo Squillo	56	Songwriter, TV presenter	Milan	11	42	Walked
Jeremias Rodríguez	30	Model, TV personality	Buenos Aires, Argentina	18	40	7th Eliminated
Viktorija Mihajlović	22	Models	Rome	1	35	6th Eliminated
Virginia Mihajlović	20	Models	Rome	1	35	6th Eliminated
Giorgia Venturini	35	PR expert, TV personality	Novafeltria	1	28	5th Eliminated
Yuri Rambaldi	26	Model and stripper	Vigevano	1	21	4th Eliminated
Grecia Colmenares	56	Actress	Valencia, Venezuela	1	18	3rd Eliminated
Youma Diakite	47	Model, actress and TV personality	Kayes, Mali	1	12	Walked
Demetra Hampton	50	Actress, former model	Philadelphia, Pennsylvania, United States	1	11	2nd Eliminated
Taylor Mega	25	Model, influencer	Udine	1	8	1st Eliminated

=== Saranno isolani ===
Contestant	Profession	Birthplace	Status
Yuri Rambaldi	Stripper	Vigevano	Winner
Giorgia Venturini	PR expert, TV personality	Novafeltria	Winner
Alice Fabbrica	Travel blogger	Meda	Finalist
John Vitale	Stripper, former model	Ponticelli	Retired finalist
Chiara Patriarca	Greengrocer	Latina, Lazio	Eliminated
Eleonora Massara	Businesswoman	Borgomanero	Eliminated
Lucia Grieco	Salesperson	Pisticci	Eliminated
Mirko Pontessili	Call center operator	Rome	Eliminated
Salvatore Vigliucci	Council employee	Bellona, Campania	Eliminated
Mario "Falco" Ferri	Soccer player	Pescara	Walked

=== Guest stars ===
Name	Profession	Birthplace	Duration
Filippo Nardi	Disc jockey, TV personality	London, England	Day 1
Francesca Cipriani	Showgirl, TV personality	Popoli	Day 7 - 10
Divino Otelma	Psychic, TV personality	Genoa	Day 7

=== Guests in Honduras ===
Ospite	Profession	Birthplace	Duration
Karin Trentini	Businesswoman, actress	Rome	Day 29
Romina Giamminelli	TV personality	Naples	Day 47
Nicoletta Larini	Businesswoman	Camaiore	Day 25
Veronica Maccarone	Actress	Catania	Day 54

== Nominations table ==
Legend

Leader: he/she is exempt from nominations and immediately nominates a contestant
The contestant is immune

	Week 1	Week 2		Week 3	Week 4		Week 5		Week 6	Week 7	Week 8		Week 9	{{nowrap|Week 10			Week 11 Final			Nominations received
Leader	Marina	Paolo	Marco		Soleil		Ghezzal		Soleil					–	Marina		–			Nominations received
Marco	Demetra	Demetra	Grecia	Sarah	No; Nominations	Luca	No; Nominations	Viktorija & Virginia	Luca	Luca	Nominated	Luca	Luca	Saved	Saved	Sarah	Nominated	Immune	Winner (Day 68)	6
Marina	Taylor	Demetra	Yuri	Yuri	No; Nominations	Giorgia	No; Nominations	Riccardo	Jeremias	Ghezzal	Nominated	Riccardo	Riccardo	Immune	Soleil; Sarah	Aaron; Sarah	Saved	Nominated	Runner-up (Day 68)	6
Luca	Demetra	Demetra	Grecia	Kaspar	No; Nominations	Giorgia	No; Nominations	Jo	Ghezzal	Ghezzal	Nominated	Marco	Marco	Cayo Solitario		Aaron	Sarah; Marco	Nominated	3rd Place (Day 68)	21
Sarah	Kaspar	Kaspar	Aaron	Yuri	No; Nominations	Marco	Nominated	Ariadna	Ghezzal	Aaron	Nominated	Aaron	Aaron	Immune	Nominated	Aaron	Nominated	4th Place (Day 68)		13
Aaron	Demetra	Sarah	Sarah	Kaspar	No; Nominations	Giorgia	Nominated	Marina	Jeremias	Jo	Nominated	Sarah	Sarah	Nominated	Saved	Sarah	5th Place (Day 68)			13
Soleil	Not on Island			Yuri	No; Nominations	Luca	No; Nominations	Luca	Marina	Luca	No; Nominations	Paolo	Luca; Marina	Immune	Nominated	Eliminated (Day 61)				1
Stefano	Not on Island		Yuri	Yuri	Nominated	Marco	Nominated	Cayo Solitario		Exempt	Cayo Solitario					Eliminated (Day 61)				6
Kaspar	Aaron	Luca	Yuri	Yuri	Cayo Solitario					Exempt	Cayo Solitario					Eliminated (Day 61)				6
Riccardo	Demetra	Demetra	Yuri	Yuri	No; Nominations	Giorgia	No; Nominations	Viktorija & Virginia	Ariadna	Marina	Nominated	Marina	Marina	Nominated	Cayo Solitario	Eliminated (Day 61)				7
Paolo	Kaspar	Grecia	Grecia	Yuri	No; Nominations	Giorgia	No; Nominations	Jo	Jeremias	Ghezzal	Nominated	Luca	Eliminated (Day 54)							1
Ariadna	Not on Island				No; Nominations	Luca	No; Nominations	Riccardo	Jo	Aaron	Nominated	Eliminated (Day 47)								2
Ghezzal	Demetra	Demetra	Sarah	Yuri	No; Nominations	Giorgia	No; Nominations	Luca	Luca	Luca	Walked (Day 44)									7
Jo	Not on Island		Yuri	Yuri	No; Nominations	Giorgia	Nominated	Luca	Luca	Aaron	Walked (Day 42)									4
Jeremias	Not on Island			Yuri	No; Nominations	Stefano	No; Nominations	Viktorija & Virginia	Luca	Eliminated (Day 40)										3
Viktorija & Virginia	Demetra	Demetra	Grecia	Ghezzal	No; Nominations	Stefano	No; Nominations	Riccardo	Eliminated (Day 35)											3
Giorgia	Potential Contestant		Yuri	Ghezzal	Nominated	Marco	Eliminated (Day 28)													8
Yuri	Potential Contestant		Giorgia	Aaron	Nominated	Eliminated (Day 21)														16
Grecia	Demetra	Luca	Kaspar	Eliminated (Day 18)																6
Youma	Grecia	Sarah	Sarah	Walked (Day 12)																0
Demetra	Luca	Luca	Eliminated (Day 11)																	14
Taylor	Riccardo	Demetra	Eliminated (Day 8)																	1
Nominated by Tribe	Demetra; Kaspar	Demetra	Sarah; Yuri	Kaspar; Yuri	–	Giorgia; Marco	–	Riccardo; Viktorija & Virginia	Jeremias; Luca	Aaron; Ghezzal	–	Luca	–			Aaron	–			
Nominated by Leader	Taylor	Grecia		Sarah	–	Luca	–	Luca	Marina	Luca	–	Paolo	Luca; Marina	–		Sarah	–			
Nominated due to a challenge	–				Giorgia; Stefano; Yuri	–	Aaron; Jo; Sarah; Stefano	–			Aaron; Ariadna; Luca; Marco; Marina; Paolo; Riccardo; Sarah	–		Aaron; Riccardo	Sarah; Soleil	–	Marco; Sarah	Luca; Marina	–	
Eliminated	Taylor; 45%	Demetra; 82%	Grecia; 38%	Kaspar; 40%	Yuri; 41%	Giorgia; 39%	Stefano; 34%	Viktorija & Virginia; 52%	Jeremias; 62%	Eviction cancelled	Ariadna; 21%	Paolo; 53%	Luca; 58%	Riccardo; 64%	Soleil; 73%	Aaron; 52%	Sarah; 53%	Luca; 59%	Marina; 39% to win	
Eliminated	Taylor; 45%	Demetra; 82%	Grecia; 38%	Kaspar; 40%	Yuri; 41%	Giorgia; 39%	Stefano; 34%	Viktorija & Virginia; 52%	Jeremias; 62%	Eviction cancelled	Ariadna; 21%	Paolo; 53%	Luca; 58%	Riccardo; 64%	Soleil; 73%	Aaron; 52%	Sarah; 53%	Luca; 59%	Marco; 61% to win	
Cayo Solitario Nominated	–								Jeremias; Kaspar	Eviction cancelled	–	Kaspar; Paolo; Stefano	–	Kaspar; Luca; Riccardo; Soleil; Stefano		–				
Cayo Solitario Eliminated	–								Jeremias; 64%	Eviction cancelled	–	Paolo; 43%	–	Riccardo; 9% to save Kaspar; 14% to save Stefano; 17% to save Soleil; 27% to save		–				

== TV Ratings and guests ==
Episode	Date	Viewers	Share	Guests
1	January 24, 2019	3,062,000	18.27%	none
2	January 31, 2019	2,405,000	13.28%	none
3	February 3, 2019	2,748,000	14.79%	none
4	February 10, 2019	2,399,000	13.76%	none
5	February 13, 2019	2,885,000	17.30%	none
6	February 20, 2019	2,601,000	14.44%	none
7	February 27, 2019	2,832,000	16.92%	none
8	March 4, 2019	2,846,000	16.86%	Cecilia Rodríguez, Fabrizio Corona
9	March 11, 2019	2,999,000	17.31%	none
10	March 18, 2019	2,827,000	17.34%	none
Semifinal	March 25, 2019	2,970,000	18.30%	none
Final	April 1, 2019	3,231,000	18.06%	none
Average		2,820,000	16.39%	
