= Fabio Alisei =

Italian radio host

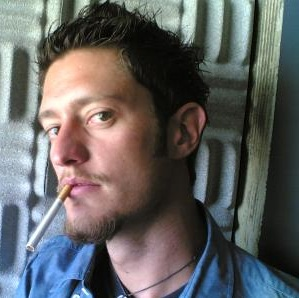
- Born: Fabio Borghini; 4 June 1975 (age 51); Genoa, Italy
- Occupations: Radio host, Deejay
- Years active: 1999–present
- Children: 2

Fabio Alisei (born Fabio Borghini; 4 June 1975 in Genoa, Italy) is an Italian radio host. He is known for having conduct the radio programs Lo Zoo di 105 on Radio 105 Network and Asganaway on Radio Deejay.

== Career ==
=== Early career ===
He graduated at a grammar school. He has also supported some examinations in the Faculty of Letters in Genoa. Since 1995, he has been playing the piano and in 2002 he attended a music school equated with the Conservatorio Paganini in Genoa. After secondary school, he became a musician and composer. He has worked with the theater Campopisano in Genoa. From 1994 to 1999, he worked as an animator and head of animation in resorts in Italy and abroad, where he met the radio host Max Laudadio with whom he began a collaboration. In 1999 he started working for television, the satellite channel Match Music, based in Verona. For nearly a year he worked as an author of the "Bar Show", hosted by Max Laudadio. Then, for three years, he wrote and performed with Paolo Noise the program Neuromachine, which had a format of prank phone calls on air. It met with little success.

=== Radio 105 Network ===
In 2002 he wrote and starred in gags and services for Rai 2, in an afternoon format titled "My Compilation - Revolution". During this period he met Marco Mazzoli, his companion for adventure on radio since 2003 with Lo Zoo di 105.

=== Radio Deejay ===
In January 2011, with Paolo Noise and Mago Wender, leaves Radio 105 Network to go to Radio Deejay, where from 25 January lead transmission Trun Trin Tran on DeeJay TV. He's co-host of the programs: 50 Songs and Asganaway with Albertino, Noise and Wender and Sabato Sega with Wender. He worked for Radio Deejay until February 2015.

=== Return to Radio 105 Network ===
In 2015 he returned to co-host the famous radio program Lo Zoo di 105.

=== Other projects ===
In June 2008 he published his first book titled Tutto a posto e niente in ordine.

== Filmography ==
=== Movies ===
- On Air: Storia di un successo (2016)

=== TV Series ===
- Via Massena, (2011–2012)
