= Mario (TV series) =

Italian television series

- Screenshot taken from the theme song of the series
- Genre: Sitcom
- Starring: Marcello Macchia; Franco Mari; Luigi Luciano; Enrico Venti; Adelaide Manselli; Nino Frassica; Pippo Lorusso; Enrico Venti; Nina Prestigiovanni; Luca Confortini; Francesca Macrì; Lavinia Longhi; Alberto Azarya; Leone Di Lernia; Marco Mazzoli; Alan Caligiuri
- Country of origin: Italy
- Original language: Italian
- No. of seasons: 2
- No. of episodes: 34

Original release
- Network: MTV Italy
- Release: February 28, 2013 – 2014

Mario is an Italian TV series conceived by Marcello Macchia, aka Maccio Capatonda, broadcast on the channel MTV from February 28, 2013 to November 25, 2014.

Presented with the tagline "a series of Maccio Capatonda," it is the first television series made by Capatonda, known for being the author and the main interpreter of numerous comedians video clips, including various fictitious trailers published on the web or broadcast on television programs (Mai dire..., All Music Show, Ma anche no).

== Plot ==
=== First season ===
The journalist Mario, protagonist of the series, is the presenter of the MTG, a news program directed by Paolo Buonanima, his putative father. After the mysterious disappearance of the director, the multinational Micidial Corporation buys the broadcaster that transmits the MTG and imposes the airing of its questionable sponsors during the live broadcasts. Mario is not there and decides to leave, but is blocked by Lord Micidial, the new owner, who not only forces him to give up his resignation with a hidden contractual clause, but also his son Ginetto alongside him, an inept who will have to be instructed on the art of journalism to one day take Mario's place. After trying in vain to teach his job to Ginetto, Mario's only chance to escape the "deadly" grip remains to find Buonanima and return everything as before. Mario tries in every way to track down his putative father, thanks also to the help of Melany, the daughter of Lord Micidial, initially the journalist's enemy and later his fiancée, but the wicked businessman prevents him. At the end of the season Mario discovers that Lord Micidial is his real father and that Melany and Ginetto are his brothers, and he passes out from the shock immediately.

=== Second season ===
Struck by the trauma of having discovered that Lord Micidial is his real father, Mario falls into coma. Micidial takes advantage of this to completely erase his memory with an instrument called "Scordammociopassat", and instructs him to make him a vulgar and corrupt journalist, the opposite of what he was in the past. Micidial then bribes all MTG members to tell Mario about his past, and locks his daughter Melany in a madhouse. Mario therefore becomes a full-fledged Micidial, and the MTG transforms itself from a simple newscast aimed at information into a television program devoted to sponsors and listenings. In the meantime, the Micidial Corporation, put in serious crisis by the Chinese competition, decides to enter politics and candidates Ginetto as premier, placing him in charge of a party called "Everyone famous". Once memory is regained, Mario returns to his original goal, that of finding his putative father Paolo Buonanima and ending the "deadly" grip once and for all, with the help of his sister Melany, his friends and Scatarrutti lawyer, who turns out to be the mother of Mario, Melany and Ginetto. After many vicissitudes, Mario's plan to defeat Lord Micidial is successful: "Everyone famous" loses the election by one vote, that of Ginetto himself, and Lord Micidial is arrested.

== Cast ==
- Marcello Macchia as Mario and several minor characters of the sitcom – Mario is the protagonist, he hosts a news program for the MTG. At the end of the first season, he discovers he is the son of Lord Micidial.
- Franco Mari as Lord Micidial – Antagonist of Mario and president of the Micidial Corporation.
- Luigi Luciano as Ginetto Micidial and several minor characters of the sitcom – Ginetto is the son of Lord Micidial.
- Enrico Venti as Ozio and several minor characters of the sitcom – Ozio is the waiter of the MTG.
- Adelaide Manselli as Jenny – Jenny is the fat makeup artist of Mario
- Nino Frassica as Pompiero in the first season and Pippo Baudo in the last episode of the second season – Pompiero is a fireman who investigates of the disappearance of the former President of the MTG, Paolo Buonanima. The fake Pippo Baudo is a presenter of a program aired on Micidial TV.
- Lavinia Longhi as Melany Micidial – Lover of Mario and daughter of Lord Micidial, at the end of the first season, she discover that Mario is her brother.
- Leone Di Lernia as Jo Carlone – Chairman of a lot of restaurants specialising in spaghetti. He is the friend of Lord Micidial.
