= L'isola dei famosi season 15 =

L'isola dei famosi
- Season 15
- Presented by: Ilary Blasi (in the studio); Massimiliano Rosolino (from the island)
- No. of days: 85
- No. of castaways: 26
- Winner: Simone "Awed" Paciello
- Runner-up: Valentina Persia
- Location: Cayos Cochinos, Honduras
- No. of episodes: 22

Release
- Original network: Canale 5
- Original release: March 15 – June 7, 2021

Season chronology
- ← Previous; Season 14 Next → Season 16

L'isola dei famosi 15 is the fifteenth edition of the reality television L'isola dei famosi and the Italian version of the reality show franchise Survivor, aired in prime time on Canale 5 from 15 March to 7 June 2021. It was the sixth consecutive edition broadcast by Mediaset, with Ilary Blasi presenting for the first time, flanked in the studio by commentators Iva Zanicchi, Elettra Lamborghini and Tommaso Zorzi, and with the participation of the correspondent Massimiliano Rosolino. It lasted 85 days, with 26 castaways and 22 episodes and was held at Cayos Cochinos (Honduras). The motto of this edition was L'isola dei famosi 2021: Liberi di sognare!.

The story of the castaways was broadcast by Canale 5 in prime time with a double weekly appointment (Mondays and Thursdays, and later on Mondays and Fridays), while the transmission of the daily strips in the day-time was entrusted to Canale 5 and Italia 1 from Monday to Friday. Furthermore, the day-time was broadcast on La5 and Mediaset Extra with the addition of unpublished material with the title of L'isola dei famosi - Extended Edition, the duration of which varied from 175 to 180 minutes.

The edition ended with the victory of Simone Paciello, known as Awed, who was awarded the prize money of €100,000.

== Contestants ==
The age of the contestants refers to the time of landing on the island.

Contestant	Age	Profession	Birthplace	Day entered	Day exited	Status
Simone "Awed" Paciello	24	YouTuber, comedian	Naples	1	85	Winner
Valentina Persia	49	Comedian, actress, dancer	Rome	4	85	Runner-up
Andrea Cerioli	31	Influencer, TV personality	Bologna	11	85	3rd Place
Ignazio Moser	28	TV personality, former track cyclist	Trento	46	85	4th Place
Beatrice Marchetti	25	Model	Zone, Lombardy	22	85	5th Place
Matteo Diamante	31	Influencer, event planner, TV personality	Genoa	39	85	6th Place
Isolde Kostner	46	Former skier, hotel manager	Bolzano	22	78	14th Eliminated
Miryea Stabile	23	Dancer, influencer, model TV personality	Brescia	4	78	13th Eliminated
Roberto Ciufoli	61	Actor, voice actor, comedian	Rome	1	78	12th Eliminated
Angela Melillo	53	Showgirl, actress, dancer	Rome	1	71	11th Eliminated
Fariba Tehrani	58	TV personality	Tehran, Iran	1	71	10th Eliminated
Rosaria Cannavò	37	Model, showgirl	Catania	39	68	9th Eliminated
Francesca Lodo	38	Actress, model, showgirl	Selargius	1	64	8th Eliminated
Emanuela Tittocchia	50	Actress, TV presenter	Turin	39	61	7th Eliminated
Ubaldo Lanzo	48	Chromatologist, TV personality	Lamezia Terme	1	53	Walked
Gilles Rocca	38	Actor, director, model, TV personality	Rome	1	50	6th Eliminated
Manuela Ferrera	36	Model, showgirl	Brescia	39	46	5th Eliminated
Vera Gemma	50	Actress, TV personality	Rome	1	43	4th Eliminated
Paul Gascoigne	53	Football coach, former footballer	Gateshead, Tyne and Wear, England	1	39	Walked
Elisa Isoardi	38	TV presenter, former model	Cuneo	1	32	Walked
Brando Giorgi	54	Actor, former model	Rome	4	32	Walked
Drusilla Gucci	26	Model	Florence	1	29	3rd Eliminated
Beppe Braida	57	Comedian, TV presenter	Turin	4	25	Walked
Daniela Martani	47	Radio host, TV personality	Rome	1	22	2nd Eliminated
Akash Kumar	29	Model	New Delhi, India	1	8	1st Eliminated
Ferdinando Guglielmotti	54	Entrepreneur	Montalto di Castro	1	4	Walked

=== Guest star ===
Name	Age	Category	Profession	Birthplace	Duration
Marco Maddaloni	36	Salvavita	Judoka, TV personality	Naples	Day 1 - 4

=== Guests in Honduras ===
Name	Age	Profession	Birthplace	Duration
Arianna Cirrincione	26	TV personality, model, influencer	Genoa	Day 85
Cecilia Rodríguez	31	TV personality, model	Buenos Aires, Argentina	Day 85
Daniele Paciello	29	Chef	Naples	Day 85

== Nominations table ==
Legend

Leader: the contestant is either part of the winning team and immune or is the sole leader, so he/she can be exempt from nominations and immediately nominate a contestant
The contestant is immune

	Week 1		Week 2		Week 3			Week 4		Week 5		Week 6		Week 7		Week 8		Week 9			Week 10			Week 11			Week 12		Week 13 Final				Nominations received
	Day 1	Day 4	Day 8	Day 11	Day 15	Day 18		Week 4		Day 29	Day 32	Day 36	Day 39	Day 43	Day 46	Day 50	Day 54	Day 57	Day 61		Day 64	Day 68		Week 11			Week 12		Week 13 Final				Nominations received
Leader	Team Phase				Angela	–	Francesca	–	Roberto	Brando	Andrea	Roberto	Francesca	Andrea; Matteo	Angela	Angela; Isolde	Isolde		Ignazio; Isolde	Isolde	Awed	-				Ignazio	–	Beatrice	Andrea	Awed	–		Nominations received
Awed	Ferdinando	Akash	Brando	Gilles	Francesca	No; Nominations	Daniela	Beppe to save	Brando	Roberto	Beatrice	Isolde	Fariba	Roberto	Emanuela	Roberto	Fariba	Roberto	No; Nominations	Angela	Isolde	No; Nominations	Fariba; Miryea	Immune	No; Nominations	Isolde	Miryea	Matteo; Valentina	Saved	Valentina	Nominated	Winner (Day 85)	23
Valentina	Not on Island	Elisa	Brando	Awed	Awed	No; Nominations	Drusilla	Roberto to save	Fariba	Fariba	Paul	Fariba	Fariba	Miryea	Gilles	Miryea	Miryea	Roberto	No; Nominations	Roberto	Rosaria	Valentina	Matteo; Miryea	Nominated	No; Nominations	Isolde	Nominated	Ignazio; Matteo	Saved	Nominated	Immune	Runner-up (Day 85)	7
Andrea	Not on Island			Beppe	Miryea	No; Nominations	Daniela	Nominated	Brando	Roberto	Isolde	Fariba	Fariba	Ubaldo	Gilles	Ubaldo	Francesca	Angela	No; Nominations	Matteo	Rosaria	Nominated	Fariba; Miryea	Finalist	No; Nominations	Isolde	Finalist	Matteo; Valentina	Beatrice	Saved	Nominated	3rd Place (Day 85)	7
Ignazio	Not on Island														Gilles	Francesca	Francesca	Roberto	Roberto	Nominated	Rosaria	Ignazio	Fariba; Matteo	Nominated	Nominated	Matteo	Finalist	Matteo; Valentina	Nominated	Nominated	4th Place (Day 85)		1
Beatrice	Not on Island							Awed to save	Angela	Roberto	Awed	Awed	Playa Imboscada				Playa Imboscadissima											Awed	Nominated	5th Place (Day 85)			4
Matteo	Not on Island												Roberto	Manuela; Roberto	Roberto	Roberto	Fariba	Roberto	No; Nominations	Roberto	Andrea	Matteo	Fariba; Miryea	Nominated	Nominated	Valentina	Immune	Andrea; Valentina	6th Place (Day 85)				10
Isolde	Not on Island							No; Nominations	Drusilla	Andrea	Awed	Gilles	Fariba	Manuela	Fariba	Emanuela	Awed	Valentina	Emanuela	Andrea	Miryea	Nominated	Fariba; Miryea	Nominated	Nominated	Valentina	Playa Imboscadissima	Matteo	Eliminated (Day 78)				12
Miryea	Not on Island	Angela	Francesca	Beppe	Awed	No; Nominations	Drusilla	Playa Esperanza			Exempt	Andrea	Andrea	Gilles	Gilles	Francesca	Valentina	Angela	No; Nominations	Awed	Rosaria	No; Nominations	Awed; Matteo	Nominated	No; Nominations	Isolde	Nominated	Awed	Eliminated (Day 78)				15
Roberto	Drusilla	Exempt	Gilles	Awed	Awed	No; Nominations	Awed	Saved	Andrea	Fariba	Paul	Miryea; Vera	Fariba	Manuela	Emanuela	Emanuela	Matteo	Matteo	Nominated	Matteo	~~Angela~~	Playa Imboscadissima					Eliminated (Day 78)						28
Angela	Drusilla	Akash	Paul	Gilles	Miryea	No; Nominations	Drusilla	No; Nominations	Fariba	Paul	Beatrice	Vera	Fariba	Miryea	Gilles	Ubaldo; Miryea	Ignazio	Roberto	No; Nominations	Matteo	Miryea	Nominated	Fariba; Miryea	Nominated	No; Nominations	Miryea	Eliminated (Day 71)						13
Fariba	Potential Contestant					No; Nominations	Exempt	No; Nominations	Drusilla	Roberto	Gilles	Gilles	Valentina	Roberto	Roberto	Matteo	Matteo	Awed	No; Nominations	Awed	Rosaria	No; Nominations	Matteo; Miryea	No; Nominations	No; Nominations	Valentina	Eliminated (Day 71)						23
Rosaria	Not on Island												Roberto	Awed	Roberto	Roberto	Fariba	Roberto	Saved	Roberto	Miryea	No; Nominations	Miryea	Eliminated (Day 68)									5
Francesca	Ferdinando	Angela	Brando	Awed	Awed	No; Nominations	Daniela	No; Nominations	Brando	Isolde	Beatrice	Fariba	Awed	Miryea	Gilles	Ubaldo	Andrea	Andrea	Playa Imboscadissima		Eliminated (Day 64)												12
Emanuela	Not on Island												Roberto	Awed	Awed	Roberto	Roberto	Roberto	Nominated	Roberto	Eliminated (Day 61)												4
Ubaldo	Potential Contestant					No; Nominations	Exempt	No; Nominations	Drusilla	Roberto	Isolde	Vera	Isolde	Miryea	Gilles	Miryea	Walked (Day 52)																4
Gilles	Angela	Angela	Brando	Awed	Awed	No; Nominations	Daniela	No; Nominations	Fariba	Fariba	Beatrice	Fariba	Fariba	Miryea	Miryea	~~Isolde~~	Eliminated (Day 50)																22
Manuela	Not on Island												Gilles	Roberto	Eliminated (Day 46)																		2
Vera	Angela	Angela	Francesca	Gilles	Francesca	Nominated	Playa Esperanza				Exempt	Andrea	Valentina	Awed	Eliminated (Day 43)																		4
Paul	Ferdinando	Angela	Vera	Exempt		No; Nominations	Exempt	No; Nominations	Drusilla	Roberto	Gilles	Fariba	Walked (Day 39)																				4
Elisa	Ferdinando	Akash	Brando	Gilles	Miryea	No; Nominations	Gilles	Nominated	Drusilla	Playa Esperanza	Walked (Day 32)																						2
Brando	Not on Island	Drusilla	Francesca	Parasite Island		Nominated	Exempt	No; Nominations	Angela	Valentina	Walked (Day 32)																						10
Drusilla	Ferdinando	Akash	Vera	Francesca	Miryea	No; Nominations	Roberto	No; Nominations	Brando	~~Brando~~	Eliminated (Day 29)																						15
Beppe	Not on Island	Angela	Brando	Gilles	Awed	No; Nominations	Drusilla	Valentina to save	Fariba	Walked (Day 25)																							2
Daniela	Ferdinando	Elisa	Francesca	Gilles	Awed	No; Nominations	Gilles	No; Nominations	Francesca	Eliminated (Day 22)																							4
Akash	Drusilla	Drusilla	Eliminated (Day 8)																														4
Ferdinando	Drusilla	Parasite Island	Walked (Day 5)																														6
Nominated by Tribe	Drusilla	Akash; Angela	Brando; Francesca	Awed; Gilles	Awed	–	Drusilla	-	Drusilla	Fariba; Roberto	Beatrice	Fariba; Vera	Fariba	Miryea; Roberto	Gilles; Roberto	Miryea; Roberto	Fariba; Francesca	Roberto	–	Roberto	Rosaria	–	Fariba; Miryea	–		Isolde	–	Matteo	–				
Nominated by Leader	Ferdinando	–			Miryea	–	Daniela	-	Andrea	Valentina	–	Miryea	–	Manuela; Ubaldo	–	Emanuela; ~~Ubaldo~~	–	Valentina	–	Andrea	Isolde	–				Matteo	–	Awed	Beatrice	Valentina	–		
Nominated due to a challenge / twist	–			Vera	–	Brando; Vera	–	Andrea; Elisa	–		Fariba	–	Vera	–	Rosaria	–	Emanuela	Emanuela; Rosaria	Emanuela; Roberto	Ignazio	Fariba	Andrea; Angela; Isolde	–	Angela; Ignazio; Isolde; Matteo; Miryea; Valentina	Ignazio; Isolde; Matteo	–	Miryea; Valentina	–	Ignazio	Ignazio	Andrea; Awed	Awed; Valentina	
Eliminated	Ferdinando; 62.1% to eliminate	Akash; 75.8% to eliminate	Brando; 65.8% to eliminate	Vera; 14.8% to save	Miryea; 64.5% to eliminate	Vera; 44.2% to save	Daniela; 73.9% to eliminate	Elisa; 47.5% to save	Drusilla; 58.5% to eliminate	Fariba; 42.0% to save	Beatrice; 61.2% to eliminate	Miryea; 41.1% to save	Vera; 57.4% to eliminate	Ubaldo; 28.5% to save	Gilles; 60.8% to eliminate	Roberto; 24.0% to save	Francesca; 49.3% to eliminate	Roberto; 21% to save	Emanuela; 43.4% to save	Roberto; 56.1% to eliminate	Rosaria; 24.8% to eliminate	Andrea; 48.8% to be finalist	Fariba; 53.9% to eliminate	Angela; 2.5% to save	Ignazio; 65.8% to be finalist	Isolde; 56.5% to eliminate	Miryea; 47.0% to be finalist	Matteo; 73.2% to eliminate	Beatrice; 53.7% to eliminate	Ignazio; 51.8% to eliminate	Andrea; 67.2% to eliminate	Valentina; 39.3% to win	
Eliminated	Ferdinando; 62.1% to eliminate	Akash; 75.8% to eliminate	Brando; 65.8% to eliminate	Vera; 14.8% to save	Miryea; 64.5% to eliminate	Vera; 44.2% to save	Daniela; 73.9% to eliminate	Elisa; 47.5% to save	Drusilla; 58.5% to eliminate	Roberto; 12.0% to save	Beatrice; 61.2% to eliminate	Vera; 17.0% to save	Vera; 57.4% to eliminate	Roberto; 12.5% to save	Gilles; 60.8% to eliminate	Emanuela; 16.3% to save	Francesca; 49.3% to eliminate	Emanuela; 20% to save	Emanuela; 43.4% to save	Roberto; 56.1% to eliminate	Rosaria; 24.8% to eliminate	Andrea; 48.8% to be finalist	Fariba; 53.9% to eliminate	Angela; 2.5% to save	Ignazio; 65.8% to be finalist	Isolde; 56.5% to eliminate	Miryea; 47.0% to be finalist	Matteo; 73.2% to eliminate	Beatrice; 53.7% to eliminate	Ignazio; 51.8% to eliminate	Andrea; 67.2% to eliminate	Awed; 60.7% to win	
Eliminated	Ferdinando; 62.1% to eliminate	Akash; 75.8% to eliminate	Brando; 65.8% to eliminate	Vera; 14.8% to save	Miryea; 64.5% to eliminate	Vera; 44.2% to save	Daniela; 73.9% to eliminate	Elisa; 47.5% to save	Drusilla; 58.5% to eliminate	Roberto; 12.0% to save	Beatrice; 61.2% to eliminate	Vera; 17.0% to save	Vera; 57.4% to eliminate	Manuela; 8.2% to save	Gilles; 60.8% to eliminate	Emanuela; 16.3% to save	Francesca; 49.3% to eliminate	Rosaria; 15% to save	Emanuela; 43.4% to save	Roberto; 56.1% to eliminate	Rosaria; 24.8% to eliminate	Andrea; 48.8% to be finalist	Fariba; 53.9% to eliminate	Angela; 2.5% to save	Ignazio; 65.8% to be finalist	Isolde; 56.5% to eliminate	Miryea; 47.0% to be finalist	Matteo; 73.2% to eliminate	Beatrice; 53.7% to eliminate	Ignazio; 51.8% to eliminate	Andrea; 67.2% to eliminate	Awed; 60.7% to win	
Playa Imboscadissima Nominated	–																			Beatrice; Francesca; Roberto	Beatrice; Roberto; Rosaria	–				Beatrice; Isolde; Roberto	Beatrice; Isolde	–					
Playa Imboscadissima Eliminated	–																			Francesca; 23.0% to save	Rosaria; 20.3% to save	–				Roberto; 18.4% to save	Isolde; 38.0% to be finalist	–					

=== Notes ===
- Note 1: On Day 1, the contestants were divided in two teams: the 'Buriños' (Hicks) and the 'Rafinados' (Refined). The two teams faced off in a challenge where the winning team would win Immunity. The losing team would vote first, and the most voted contestant would end up facing public vote. Later, the winning team would vote among the other members of the losing team (not including the one already nominated), adding another person to the public vote.
- Note 2: On Day 4, the losing team would vote first in secret, later the winning team would vote in public. Both the losing and winning team had to nominate someone from the losing team, not including the contestants that joined the competition on Day 4. The sum of the votes of the two teams would determine the contestants up for elimination. Additionally, due to an injury, Roberto was momentarily absent as he was receiving medical care, therefore he was exempt from nominations.
- Note 3: On Day 8, there was a challenge that determined a team switch. The two teams had to indicate the strongest contestant from the opposing team: the two would become the 'reward' of the challenge, joining the winning team. Before receiving the strongest contestant from the other team, however, the winning team would have to point out their weakest link through a saving chain, starting from their own strongest contestant. The person remaining and not saved with the chain would go to the losing team, as a sort of exchange to make teams even numbered. Gilles (Buriños) and Brando (Rafinados) were indicated as the strongest contestants, so Brando joined the winning team, while Daniela was indicated as the weakest link and joined the losing team. The newly reformed teams later competed for another immunity challenge.
- Note 4: On Day 11, Andrea entered the competition and there was a challenge to determine which team he would be on: Valentina and Francesca won the challenge for the 'Buriños'. Later, Andrea and Roberto faced off in the immunity challenge. Roberto won immunity for his team, and had to start a saving chain to determine the first nominated contestant from the losing team, excluding Andrea who had just arrived. The chain went: Roberto → Beppe → Valentina → Francesca → Gilles → Awed. Vera was left out and was automatically nominated. Additionally, due to an injury, Paul was momentarily absent as he was receiving medical care, therefore he was exempt from nominations.
- Note 5: On Day 18, Brando, Fariba, Vera and Ubaldo were all living on Parasite Island. Fariba and Ubaldo, as they had started the game there as potential contestants, were ultimately deemed ready to officially enter the game, while Brando and Vera, who had started the game as official contestants but had been eliminated in a public vote, had to face off in a nomination where only one of them would be voted back into the game. The loser would go to another Island, Playa Esperanza.
- Note 6: On Day 32, out of the 3 nominated contestants, only one would be saved by the public vote, while the other 2 would have their fate decided by the Leader of the episode. Andrea had to decide who to save between Fariba and Roberto, making the other the first nominated contestant of the week. He saved Roberto.
- Note 7: On Day 43, the contestants were divided in 2 teams. Two leaders were elected, one for each team, and the members could only vote for someone of their own team. The two teams were: 1) Awed, Emanuela, Fariba, Isolde, Manuela, Matteo, Roberto and Rosaria VS 2) Andrea, Angela, Francesca, Gilles, Miryea, Ubaldo, Valentina and Vera. Four contestants would be facing nomination: the two most voted contestants by each team and the two contestants named by the leader of each team. Of the four, only one would be saved the public vote, while the other 3 would have their fate in the hands of the leader of Day 46. The leader would decide which of the 3 would be eliminated.
- Note 8: On Day 46, there was a saving chain to determine one of the nominees. The chain went Fariba → Matteo → Awed → Isolde → Roberto → Emanuela. Rosaria was left out and became the first nominee. Subsequently, both teams had to once again nominate someone from their own team.
- Note 9: On Day 57, the outgoing leader (Isolde) had to choose 3 people from her team to be in danger of nomination. She chose Awed, Roberto and Valentina. In return, each one had to choose one person to face off in a challenge, with the loser becoming automatically nominated. The teams were merged and therefore they could choose anyone. Awed chose Emanuela and won, Valentina chose Rosaria and won, Roberto chose Fariba and, since they both had a record-breaking performance, neither was nominated.
- Note 10: On Day 61, four people were facing public vote (Emanuela, Roberto, Rosaria and Valentina). Out of them, one was saved by the public vote (Valentina) and had to challenge the outgoing leader (Isolde). Isolde won, and she had to choose one of the other three people who had not been saved: this person would face off one of the other two in a new public vote resulting in an elimination. Later, the four remaining men (not including Roberto) competed to become the second leader of the night. Ignazio won and had to choose who to nominate between Roberto and Rosaria. He chose Roberto. Therefore, Emanuela and Roberto were nominated. Additionally, the two leaders had to compete in a challenge which would determine the leader of the weekly nomination. The loser would lose immunity and be nominated.
- Note 11: On Day 64, multiple challenges were done to determine which contestants would win immunity. Four people won: Angela, Awed, Matteo and Valentina. These four had to decide which of them would face off against Isolde, the outgoing leader, to steal her immunity. This final challenge was done after the nominations, and therefore Isolde was not eligible to be nominated by the Tribe. However, since Awed ended up winning - stealing Isolde's immunity - she became eligible to be nominated by the Leader. Furthermore, before the nominations and the challenges, Fariba was nominated by production for revealing the existence of Playa Imboscadissima to some of the other contestants.

== Guests ==
The episode was aired on a delayed basis, as it was recorded a few hours before broadcast.

Episode	Date	Guests
1	March 15, 2021	Amedeo Preziosi, Simone Rugiati, Pino Quartullo, Roger Garth, Stefania Gucci, Jedà Lenfoire
2	March 18, 2021	Roger Garth, Daniela Battizzocco, Stefania Gucci, Jedà Lenfoire, Bruno Grizzetti
3	March 22, 2021	Roger Garth, Stefania Gucci, Jedà Lenfoire, Milena Miconi
4	March 25, 2021	Daniela Battizzocco, Stefania Gucci, Jedà Lenfoire
5	March 29, 2021	Amedeo Preziosi, Roger Garth, Miriam Galanti, Daniela Battizzocco, Stefania Gucci, Jedà Lenfoire
6	April 1, 2021	Amedeo Preziosi, Arianna Cirrincione, Roger Garth, Stefania Gucci, Jedà Lenfoire, Luca Marini
7	April 5, 2021	Stefania Gucci, Jedà Lenfoire
8	April 12, 2021	Daniela Battizzocco, Camilla Giorgi, Arianna Cirrincione, Stefania Gucci, Jedà Lenfoire, Massimiliano Stabile, Tiziana Foschi
9	April 15, 2021	Marco Maddaloni, Roger Garth, Jedà Lenfoire
10	April 19, 2021	Amedeo Preziosi, Roger Garth, Jedà Lenfoire, Pio Marchetti, Giada Cerioli
11	April 22, 2021	Jedà Lenfoire, Adelio Rocca, Nicole Stabile
12	April 26, 2021	Asia Argento, Giulia Salemi, Jedà Lenfoire
13	April 29, 2021	Giulia Salemi, Cecilia Rodríguez, Giovanni Ciacci, Jedà Lenfoire, Marianna Ferrera
14	May 3, 2021	Cecilia Rodríguez, Jedà Lenfoire, Stefania Gucci
15	May 7, 2021	Arianna Cirrincione, Jedà Lenfoire, Stefania Gucci
16	May 10, 2021	Giulia Salemi, Arianna Cirrincione, Jedà Lenfoire
17	May 14, 2021	Jedà Lenfoire, Massimiliano Stabile
18	May 17, 2021	Cecilia Rodríguez, Arianna Cirrincione, Jedà Lenfoire
19	May 21, 2021	Arianna Cirrincione, Jedà Lenfoire
20	May 24, 2021	Cecilia Rodríguez, Luca Marini, Jedà Lenfoire, Silvia Kostner
Semifinal	May 31, 2021	Andrea Damante, Jedà Lenfoire
Final	June 7, 2021	Giovanni Diamante, Franca Diamante, Stefania Paciello, Roberto Paciello, Jedà Lenfoire, Maria Antonietta Persia, Vincenzo Persia, Nicole Stabile

== TV Ratings ==
The episode was aired on a delayed basis, as it was recorded a few hours before broadcast.

Episode	Date	Viewers	Share
1	March 15, 2021	3,602,000	21.68%
2	March 18, 2021	3,047,000	17.88%
3	March 22, 2021	3,427,000	19.76%
4	March 25, 2021	3,370,000	19.28%
5	March 29, 2021	3,394,000	18.80%
6	April 1, 2021	3,176,000	18.13%
7	April 5, 2021	3,111,000	17.10%
8	April 12, 2021	3,440,000	19.94%
9	April 15, 2021	2,942,000	17.10%
10	April 19, 2021	3,001,000	17.54%
11	April 22, 2021	2,838,000	16.90%
12	April 26, 2021	2,877,000	17.40%
13	April 29, 2021	2,871,000	16.50%
14	May 3, 2021	2,885,000	17.40%
15	May 7, 2021	2,858,000	16.80%
16	May 10, 2021	3,101,000	19.00%
17	May 14, 2021	2,796,000	16.70%
18	May 17, 2021	2,994,000	18.70%
19	May 21, 2021	2,520,000	15.70%
20	May 24, 2021	2,982,000	18.20%
Semifinal	May 31, 2021	2,926,000	19.20%
Final	June 7, 2021	3,317,000	22.97%
Average		3,067,000	18.30%
