= Davide Di Lernia =

Italian film director and editor (1978–2026)

- Born: Davide Antonio Di Lernia; 11 November 1978; Milan, Italy
- Died: 20 September 2026 (aged 47); Milan, Italy
- Occupations: Film director, producer, editor
- Years active: 2008–2026
- Relatives: Leone Di Lernia (father)

Davide Di Lernia (David Antonio Di Lernia, 11 November 1978 – 20 September 2026) was an Italian film director, producer and editor.

He was specialized in AI content and video production.

== Career ==
Di Lernia founded DDLVIDEO, a Milan-based audiovisual production company, in 1998. His work encompassed directing, filming, editing and producing music videos, television commercials, documentaries, corporate films and live-event coverage. Through DDLVIDEO, he worked across the production process, from developing concepts to filming and post-production.

Throughout his career, he collaborated with Radio Monte Carlo, Radio 105 and Virgin Radio. At the launch of Virgin Radio Television in November 2010, he served as a director and head of technical production and post-production for its programmes. He led a team of filmmakers, television editors, and video and audio engineers responsible for the channel’s productions.

His documentary credits included F for Franciacorta (2015), directed by Massimo Zanichelli and produced for the Franciacorta Consortium. Di Lernia shared the cinematography credit with Francesco Torricella and also worked as a camera operator on the film. In 2018, DDL Produzioni Video produced the television commercial accompanying the launch of RMC Sport Network, as part of the station’s advertising campaign.

In his later work, Di Lernia explored the use of artificial intelligence in music and audiovisual production. In 2024, he collaborated with music producer Alessandro Viale to recreate the voice of his father, Leone Di Lernia, for material broadcast on Lo Zoo di 105. Later that year, he conceived Natale artificiale, a Christmas song and accompanying video created with artificial intelligence to reproduce his father’s voice and likeness. Developed with Viale and presented by Radio 105 in December 2024, the project was intended as a tribute to Leone’s artistic legacy.

In July 2025, DDLVIDEO produced the entirely AI-generated music video for “Sweet Talking” by DJ and producer Soniko, based on a storyboard by Beppe Stanco, with sound design by Beat Sound.

== Personal life and death ==
Di Lernia had a daughter named Sara.

He was the son of Italian radio presenter and singer Leone Di Lernia and Nenna Rosa, and had three siblings: Marco, Savino and Elena.

Di Lernia had a daughter named Sara, born from his last relationship.

He was previously in a relationship with Italian karateka Barbara Fava, with whom he lived. They had no children together. After their romantic relationship ended in the early 2000s, they remained best friends for more than twenty years, until his sudden death.

Davide Di Lernia died in a motorcycle collision on 20 September 2026, at the age of 47. He reportedly lost control of the vehicle.
