= Asganaway =

- Genre: Comedy / Entertainment
- Country of origin: Italy
- Language(s): Italian
- Home station: Radio Deejay
- TV adaptations: Deejay TV
- Starring: Albertino, Fabio Alisei, Paolo Noise, DJ Wender, Shorty, Ginger
- Created by: Albertino
- Recording studio: Italy Milan
- Original release: 2011 – 2014

Asganaway was a radio program created by the Italian radio host Albertino (Sabino Alberto Di Molfetta) and broadcast on Radio Deejay from 2011 to 2014. The program was based on comic sketches and prank calls. The show was cancelled three years later at the decision of Linus, older brother of Albertino and artistic director.
