= L'isola dei famosi season 16 =

L'isola dei famosi
- Season 16
- Presented by: Ilary Blasi (in the studio); Alvin (from the island)
- No. of days: 99
- No. of castaways: 32
- Winner: Nicolas Vaporidis
- Runner-up: Luca Daffrè
- Location: Cayos Cochinos, Honduras
- No. of episodes: 25

Release
- Original network: Canale 5
- Original release: March 21 – June 27, 2022

Season chronology
- ← Previous; Season 15 Next → Season 17

L'isola dei famosi 16 is the sixteenth season of the reality television L'isola dei famosi and the Italian version of the reality show franchise Survivor, aired in prime time on Canale 5 from 21 March to 27 June 2022. It was the seventh consecutive edition broadcast by Mediaset, hosted by Ilary Blasi for the second consecutive year, supported in the studio by commentators Nicola Savino and Vladimir Luxuria, and with the participation of the correspondent Alvin. It lasted 99 days, had 32 castaways and 25 episodes and was held in Cayos Cochinos (Honduras). The motto of this edition was L'isola dei famosi 2022: Tutto può cambiare!.

The stories of the castaways were broadcast by Canale 5 in prime time with a double weekly appointment (Mondays and Thursdays up to the eighth episode, followed by the ninth to the twentieth episode on Mondays and Fridays and finally from the twenty-first to the twenty-fifth episode only on Mondays), while the transmission of the daily strips in the day-time was entrusted to Canale 5 and Italia 1 from Monday to Friday. Furthermore, the day-time was broadcast on La5 and Mediaset Extra with the addition of unpublished material with the title of L'isola dei famosi . Extended Edition, the duration of which is 185 minutes.

The edition was won by Nicolas Vaporidis, who was awarded the prize pool of €100,000.

== Contestants ==
The age of the contestants refers to the time of landing on the island.

Contestant	Age	Profession	Birthplace	Day entered	Day exited	Status
Nicolas Vaporidis	40	Actor, film producer, restaurateur	Rome	1	99	Winner
Luca Daffrè	26	Model, former swimmer, TV personality	Trento	57	99	Runner-up
Carmen Di Pietro	56	Actress, showgirl, radio host, former model	Potenza	1	99	3rd Place
Mercédesz Henger	30	Actress, TV personality	Győr, Hungary	47	99	4th Place
Maria Laura De Vitis	24	Model, influencer, TV personality	Reggio Emilia	47	99	5th Place
Nick Luciani	51	Singer, member of the musical group I Cugini di Campagna	Rome	15	99	6th Place
Pamela Petrarolo	45	Singer, choreographer, TV presenter	Rome	57	92	15th Eliminated
Estefanía Bernal	26	Model, TV personality	Buenos Aires, Argentina	1	92	14th Eliminated
Edoardo Tavassi	37	Voice actor, video maker, TV personality	Venice	11	92	Walked
Gennaro Auletto	22	Model	Naples	57	85	13th Eliminated
Marco Cucolo	30	Model, video maker, TV personality	Naples	1	81	Walked
Lory Del Santo	63	Actress, record, TV personality	Povegliano Veronese	1	78	12th Eliminated
Roger Balduino	29	Model	Erechim, Brazil	1	74	Walked
Marco Maccarini	45	Radio host, TV presenter	Turin	57	71	11th Eliminated
Fabrizia Santarelli	29	Model, lawyer, TV personality	Bari	47	68	10th Eliminated
Licia Nunez	44	Actress	Barletta	22	64	Walked
Franco "Blind" Rujan	22	Rapper	Perugia	4	64	Walked
Guendalina Tavassi	36	Influencer, TV personality	Rome	11	64	Walked
Alessandro Iannoni	20	University student	Rome	1	64	Walked
Clemente Russo	39	Boxer, TV personality	Caserta	1	57	9th Eliminated
Laura Maddaloni	41	Judoka athlete	Naples	1	54	8th Eliminated
Ilona Staller	70	Singer, former pornographic actress, former radio host	Budapest, Hungary	1	43	7th Eliminated
Marco Senise	58	TV presenter	Rome	22	40	6th Eliminated
Gustavo Rodríguez	62	Former pastor of the Anglican Church in Argentina	Buenos Aires, Argentina	1	33	5th Eliminated
Jeremias Rodríguez	33	Influencer, TV personality	Buenos Aires, Argentina	1	29	Walked
Floriana Secondi	44	TV personality	Rome	1	25	4th Eliminated
Jovana Djordjevic	30	Model	Novi Sad, Vojvodina, Serbia	1	25	Walked
Roberta Morise	36	Singer, model, TV presenter	Cariati	4	18	3rd Eliminated
Silvano Michetti	75	Drummer, founder of the musical group I Cugini di Campagna	Rome	15	17	Ejected
Marco Melandri	39	Motorcycle rider	Ravenna	1	15	2nd Eliminated
Patrizia Bonetti	27	Influencer, model, TV personality	Havana, Cuba	4	11	Walked
Antonio Zequila	58	Actor, TV personality	Atrani	1	11	1st Eliminated

=== Guests in Honduras ===
Name	Age	Profession	Birthplace	Duration
Beatriz Marino	30	Model, influencer	Rio de Janeiro, Brazil	Day 40 - 47
Federico Perna	35	Catering manager	Rome	Day 47
Greta Tigani	22	Nail designer	Perugia	Day 61
Cloè D'Arcangelo	26	Model	Milan	Day 68
Vanessa Perna	50	Singer	Rome	Day 85
Alessandro Iannoni	20	University student	Rome	Day 99
Maurizio Daffrè	70	Retired	Trento	Day 99
Rossana De Vitis	50	TV personality	Reggio Emilia	Day 99

=== Guest stars ===
Name	Age	Profession	Birthplace	Duration
Soleil Sorge	27	Influencer, model, TV personality	Los Angeles, California, United States	Day 78
Vera Gemma	51	Actress, TV personality	Rome	Day 78

== Nominations table ==
Legend

Leader: the contestant is the challenge winner / part of the winning duo and immune; they have to pick a contestant / duo that will be directly nominated
The contestant is immune

	Duos Phase						Teams Phase				Individual Phase																							Nominations received
	Week 1		Week 2		Week 3		Week 4		Week 5			Week 6		Week 7		Week 8			Week 9		Week 10		Week 11		Week 12	Week 13		Week 14		Week 15 Final				Nominations received
	Day 1	Day 4	Day 8	Day 11	Day 15	Day 18	Day 22	Day 25	Day 29	Day 33		Day 36	Day 40	Day 43	Day 47	Day 50		Day 54	Day 57	Day 61	Day 64	Day 68	Week 11		Week 12	Week 13		Week 14		Week 15 Final				Nominations received
Leader	Gustavo & Jeremias	Estefanía & Nicolas		Ilona & Roger	Gustavo & Jeremias	Alessandro & Carmen	Estefanía & Roger	Nick	Licia; Nicolas	–	Blind	Roger	Guendalina	Carmen	Roger	–	Guendalina; Roger	Alessandro; Maria Laura		Carmen	Luca		–	Luca		–	Carmen	–	Luca	–				Nominations received
Nicolas	Alessandro & Carmen	Antonio & Floriana	Clemente & Laura	Lory & Marco C.	Lory & Marco C.	Gustavo & Jeremias	Gustavo	Jeremias	Nick	Nominated	Licia	Blind	Estefanía	Laura	Laura	Mercédesz to save	Lory	Blind	Mercédesz	Estefanía	Maria Laura	Maria Laura	Carmen to save	Lory	Nick	Nominated	Nick	Exempt	Maria Laura; Mercédesz	Exempt	Exempt	Nominated	Winner (Day 99)	34
Luca	Not on Island																		Mercédesz	Roger	Roger	Nick	Exempt	Lory	Estefanía	Exempt	Nick	Estefanía	Nick	Maria Laura	Mercédesz	Exempt	Runner-up (Day 99)	6
Carmen	Ilona & Marco Me.	Lory & Marco C.	Blind & Roberta	Blind & Roberta	Ilona & Roger	Clemente & Floriana	Nicolas; Carmen	Blind	Marco S.	Nominated	Ilona	Nick	Estefanía	Clemente	Laura	Maria Laura to save	Mercédesz	Nicolas	Mercédesz	Gennaro	Maria Laura	Pamela	Nick to save	Estefanía	Nick	Nominated	Mercédesz	Nominated	Mercédesz; Nick	Exempt	Luca	Nominated	3rd Place (Day 99)	21
Mercédesz	Not on Island														Blind	Saved	Lory	Nicolas	Guendalina	Nicolas	Playa; Sgamadissima	Pamela	Exempt	Gennaro	Nick	Nominated	Nick	Nominated	Carmen; Maria Laura	Luca	Nominated	4th Place (Day 99)		15
Maria Laura	Not on Island														Blind	Nominated	Nick	Blind; Lory	Nicolas	Roger	Roger	Nick	Nominated	Gennaro	Nick	Exempt	Nick	Exempt	Nick; Nicolas	Nominated	5th Place (Day 99)			18
Nick	Not on Island				Estefanía & Nicolas	Ilona & Nicolas	Nicolas	Estefanía & Roger	Marco S.	Nominated	Estefanía	Estefanía	Estefanía	Laura	Laura	Mercédesz to save	Lory	Nicolas	Exempt			Maria Laura	Lory to save	Estefanía	Estefanía	Exempt	Luca	Playa; Sgamadissima	Maria Laura; Mercédesz	6th Place (Day 99)				34
Pamela	Not on Island																		Mercédesz	Luca	Roger	Marco C.	Nominated	Marco C.	Playa; Sgamadissima				Eliminated (Day 92)					3
Estefanía	Alessandro & Carmen	Antonio & Floriana	Clemente & Laura	Lory & Marco C.	Lory & Marco C.	Clemente & Floriana	Nick	Licia	Ilona	Exempt	Licia	Guendalina	Carmen	~~Nicolas~~	Playa; Sgamada				Nicolas	Roger	Roger	Nick	Edoardo to save	Lory	Nick	Exempt	Nick	Nominated	Mercédesz	Eliminated (Day 92)				27
Edoardo	Not on Island			Blind & Roberta	Lory & Marco C.	Ilona & Nicolas	Gustavo	Blind	Marco S.	Nominated	Roger	Estefanía	Estefanía	Laura	Laura	Mercédesz to save	Lory	Blind	Mercédesz	Estefanía	Maria Laura	Maria Laura	Nicolas to save	Lory	Nick	Exempt	Nick	Walked (Day 92)						6
Gennaro	Not on Island																		Guendalina	Roger	Carmen	Maria Laura	Exempt	Lory	Estefanía	Playa; Sgamadissima	Mercédesz	Eliminated (Day 85)						3
Marco C.	Ilona & Marco Me.	Alessandro & Carmen	Blind & Roberta	Blind & Roberta	Estefanía & Nicolas	~~Ilona &~~; ~~Roger~~	Playa; Sgamada		Ilona	Exempt	Nicolas	Guendalina	Edoardo	Nick	Nicolas	Mercédesz to save	Nicolas	~~Roger~~	Nicolas	Roger	Exempt	Pamela	Nominated	Estefanía	Estefanía	Walked (Day 80)								12
Lory	Ilona & Marco Me.	Alessandro & Carmen	Blind & Roberta	Blind & Roberta	Estefanía & Nicolas	~~Ilona &~~; ~~Roger~~	Playa; Sgamada		Edoardo	Nominated	Ilona	Playa; Sgamada		Nick	Blind	Mercédesz to save	Nicolas	Blind	Nicolas	Guendalina	Maria Laura	Maria aura	Saved	Estefanía	~~Luca~~	Eliminated (Day 78)								24
Roger	Playa; Sgamada		Alessandro & Carmen	Gustavo & Jeremias	Lory & Marco C.	Clemente & Floriana	Nick	Licia	Ilona	Exempt	Licia	Edoardo	Carmen	Nick	Lory	Mercédesz to save	Edoardo; Marco C.	Exempt		Lory	Maria Laura	~~Estefanía~~	Playa; Sgamadissima		Walked (Day 73)									15
Marco Ma.	Not on Island																		Mercédesz	Estefanía	Maria Laura	Carmen	Playa; Sgamadissima	Estefanía	Eliminated (Day 71)									1
Fabrizia	Not on Island														Blind	Nominated	~~Maria Laura~~	Playa; Sgamada	Playa; Sgamadissima			Eliminated (Day 68)												0
Licia	Not on Island						Exempt	Blind	Estefanía & Roger	Exempt	Nicolas	Blind	Alessandro	Playa; Sgamada					Playa; Sgamadissima		Walked (Day 64)													22
Blind	Not on Island	Antonio & Floriana	Alessandro & Carmen	Lory & Marco C.	Lory & Marco C.	Ilona & Nicolas	Nicolas	Jeremias	Ilona	Exempt	Edoardo	Guendalina	Carmen	Nick	Nicolas	Exempt		Nicolas	Mercédesz	Playa; Sgamadissima	Walked (Day 64)													4
Guendalina	Not on Island			Blind & Roberta	Lory & Marco C.	Ilona & Nicolas	Gustavo; Guendalina	Jeremias	Marco S.	Nominated	Roger	Blind	Blind	Laura	Laura	Mercédesz to save	Marco C. Maria Laura	Exempt	Mercédesz	Estefanía	Walked (Day 64)													11
Alessandro	Ilona & Marco Me.	Lory & Marco C.	Blind & Roberta	Blind & Roberta	Ilona & Roger	Clemente & Floriana	Nick	Jeremias	Ilona	Exempt	Ilona	Nick	Estefanía	Laura	Laura	Maria Laura to save	Lory	Blind; Nick	Nicolas	Estefanía	Walked (Day 64)													13
Clemente	Ilona & Marco Me.	Alessandro & Carmen	Alessandro & Carmen	Lory & Marco C.	Lory & Marco C.	Ilona & Nicolas	~~Estefanía~~; ~~& Roger~~	Playa; Sgamada				Nicolas	Carmen	Nick	Nicolas	Playa; Sgamada			Eliminated (Day 57)															4
Laura	Ilona & Marco Me.	Alessandro & Carmen	Alessandro & Carmen	Lory & Marco C.	Playa; Sgamada		Nicolas	Jeremias	Ilona	Exempt	Ilona	Guendalina	Carmen	Nick	Nicolas	Playa; Sgamada	~~Roger~~	Eliminated (Day 54)																18
Ilona	Alessandro & Carmen	Antonio & Floriana	Alessandro & Carmen	Gustavo & Jeremias	Lory & Marco C.	Gustavo & Jeremias	Gustavo	Jeremias	Laura	Exempt	Nicolas	Nicolas	Playa; Sgamada	Eliminated (Day 43)																				21
Marco S.	Not on Island						Exempt	Blind	Carmen	Playa; Sgamada	Ilona	Playa; Sgamada	Eliminated (Day 40)																					4
Gustavo	Antonio & Floriana	Alessandro & Carmen	Alessandro & Carmen	Estefanía & Nicolas	Ilona & Roger	Ilona & Nicolas	Guendalina; Gustavo	~~Guendalina~~	Playa; Sgamada		Eliminated (Day 33)																							8
Jeremias	Antonio & Floriana	Alessandro & Carmen	Alessandro & Carmen	Estefanía & Nicolas	Ilona & Roger	Ilona & Nicolas	Nicolas	Estefanía & Roger	Guendalina	Walked (Day 29)																								4
Floriana	Alessandro & Carmen	Lory & Marco C.	Gustavo & Jeremias	Playa; Sgamada	Lory & Marco C.	Ilona & Nicolas	~~Estefanía~~; ~~& Roger~~	Eliminated (Day 25)																										10
Jovana	Playa; Sgamada						Nick	Walked (Day 25)																										6
Roberta	Not on Island	Antonio & Floriana	Alessandro & Carmen	Lory & Marco C.	Lory & Marco C.	Eliminated (Day 18)																												6
Silvano	Not on Island				Estefanía & Nicolas	Ejected (Day 17)																												0
Marco Me.	Alessandro & Carmen	Antonio & Floriana	Playa; Sgamada		Eliminated (Day 15)																													5
Patrizia	Not on Island	Playa; Sgamada		Walked (Day 11)																														0
Antonio	Alessandro & Carmen	Lory & Marco C.	Gustavo & Jeremias	Eliminated (Day 11)																														4
4
Nominated by Tribe	Alessandro & Carmen; Ilona & Marco Me.	Alessandro & Carmen	Alessandro & Carmen	Blind & Roberta; Lory & Marco C.	Lory & Marco C.	Ilona & Nicolas	Gustavo; Nicolas	Jeremias	Ilona; Marco S.	–	Ilona	Guendalina	Carmen; Estefanía	Nick	Laura	–	Lory	Nicolas	Mercédesz	Estefanía; Roger	Maria Laura	Maria Laura	–	Estefanía	Nick	–	Nick	–	Mercédesz	–				
Nominated by Leader	Antonio & Floriana	Antonio & Floriana	Clemente & Laura	Gustavo & Jeremias	Ilona & Roger	Clemente & Floriana	Nick	Estefanía & Roger	Estefanía & Roger; Nick	–	Edoardo	Edoardo	Blind	Clemente	Lory	–	Edoardo; Marco C. Maria Laura	Blind; Lory; Nick	Nicolas	Gennaro	Roger	Nick	–	Lory	Estefanía	–	Mercédesz	–	Nick	–				
Nominated due to a challenge / twist	–									Carmen; Edoardo; Guendalina; Lory; Nick; Nicolas	–	Licia; Marco C.	–	Nicolas	–	Fabrizia; Maria Laura	–			Luca	–	Estefanía; Lory; Marco Ma.	Marco C. Maria Laura; Pamela	–	Gennaro; Maria Laura	Carmen; Mercédesz; Nicolas	–	Carmen; Estefanía; Mercédesz	–	Luca; Maria Laura	Luca; Mercédesz	Carmen; Nicolas	Luca; Nicolas	
Eliminated	Ilona & Marco Me. 43.0% to eliminate	Antonio & Floriana; 75.9% to eliminate	Clemente & Laura; 66.5% to eliminate	Blind & Roberta; 32.1% to save	Lory & Marco C. 42.7% to save	Clemente & Floriana; 43.5% to save	Gustavo; 15.1% to save	Jeremias; 31.0% to save	Marco S. 10.2% to save	Lory; 6.0% to save	Ilona; 15.7% to save	Licia; 9.2% to save	Estefanía; 8.5% to save	Clemente; 10.5% to save	Laura; 14.9% to save	Fabrizia; 35.7% to save	Marco C. 11.6% to save	Blind; 13.1% to save	Mercédesz; 24.8% to save	Gennaro; 12.2% to save	Roger; 49.2% to save	Marco Ma. 12.6% to save	Pamela; 16.7% to save	Lory; 37.4% to save	Gennaro; 6.9% to save	Nicolas; 46.5% to be finalist	Nick; 29.2% to save	Estefanía; 9.6% to be finalist	Nick; 28.3% to save	Maria Laura; 73.5% to eliminate	Mercédesz; 50.7% to eliminate	Carmen; 58.3% to eliminate	Luca; 13.4% to win	
Eliminated	Ilona & Marco Me. 43.0% to eliminate	Antonio & Floriana; 75.9% to eliminate	Clemente & Laura; 66.5% to eliminate	Blind & Roberta; 32.1% to save	Lory & Marco C. 42.7% to save	Clemente & Floriana; 43.5% to save	Gustavo; 15.1% to save	Jeremias; 31.0% to save	Marco S. 10.2% to save	Lory; 6.0% to save	Ilona; 15.7% to save	Licia; 9.2% to save	Estefanía; 8.5% to save	Clemente; 10.5% to save	Laura; 14.9% to save	Fabrizia; 35.7% to save	Marco C. 11.6% to save	Blind; 13.1% to save	Mercédesz; 24.8% to save	Gennaro; 12.2% to save	Roger; 49.2% to save	Marco Ma. 12.6% to save	Pamela; 16.7% to save	Lory; 37.4% to save	Gennaro; 6.9% to save	Nicolas; 46.5% to be finalist	Nick; 29.2% to save	Estefanía; 9.6% to be finalist	Nick; 28.3% to save	Maria Laura; 73.5% to eliminate	Mercédesz; 50.7% to eliminate	Carmen; 58.3% to eliminate	Nicolas; 86.6% to win	
Nomination for Entry	Estefanía & Nicolas; 72.8% Jovana & Roger; 27.2%	Blind; 50.1% Roberta; 25.4% Patrizia; 24.5%	–			Jovana; 49.0% Lory; 30.1% Marco C. 20.9%	–	Marco C. 54.0% Clemente; 41.3% Gustavo; 4.7%	–				Lory; 53.0% Licia; 27.5%	–				Marco C. 38.0% Licia; 26.1% Fabrizia; 13.6% Estefanía; 13.1%	–		Gennaro; 55.7%	–												
Playa Sgamada / Sgamadissima Nominated	–		Antonio; Floriana	Jovana; Laura; Marco Me.	Jovana; Laura; Roberta	–	Clemente; Floriana; Lory	–		Clemente; Gustavo	–	Ilona; Lory; Marco S.	Lory; 53.0% Licia; 27.5%	–			Clemente; Estefanía; Fabrizia; Laura; Licia	Marco C. 38.0% Licia; 26.1% Fabrizia; 13.6% Estefanía; 13.1%	–		Gennaro; 55.7%	–	Marco Ma. Pamela; Roger	Lory; Pamela	–	Gennaro; Pamela	–	Estefanía; Nick; Pamela	–					
Playa Sgamada / Sgamadissima Eliminated	–		Antonio; 19.3% to save	Marco Me. 15.7% to save	Roberta; 12.8% to save	–	Floriana; 23.2% to save	–		Gustavo; 16.1% to save	–	Marco S. 23.8% to save	Ilona; 19.5% to save	–			Laura; 4.6% to save	Clemente; 9.2% to save	–		Fabrizia; 44.3% to save	–	Marco Ma. 25.7% to save	Lory; 24.3% to save	–	Gennaro; 26.7% to save	–	Pamela; 36.8% to be finalist	–					
Playa Sgamada / Sgamadissima Eliminated	–		Antonio; 19.3% to save	Marco Me. 15.7% to save	Roberta; 12.8% to save	–	Floriana; 23.2% to save	–		Gustavo; 16.1% to save	–	Marco S. 23.8% to save	Ilona; 19.5% to save	–			Laura; 4.6% to save	Clemente; 9.2% to save	–		Fabrizia; 44.3% to save	–	Marco Ma. 25.7% to save	Lory; 24.3% to save	–	Gennaro; 26.7% to save	–	Estefanía; 26.2% to be finalist	–					

=== Notes ===
- Day 1: Sixteen contestants entered the game. Eight of them were already paired in four duos with their significant other or family member, while the other eight were singles. Antonio and Ilona were given the chance to pick one contestant each among the other six singles to form a duo with: Antonio chose Floriana while Ilona chose Marco M. Later, through a lottery mechanism, Jovana also had the chance to pick her duo partner among the three remaining singles, choosing Roger. The final two duos that were formed had to face off in a nomination, where only the most saved duo by the public would join the game, while the other duo would seemingly be eliminated. Estefanía and Nicolas won, so they joined the other six duos and were immune from the following nominations. Jovana and Roger then found out they were not actually eliminated, but that they would go to Playa Sgamada, a second beach where the duos were disbanded and all the contestants would play by themselves to try to get back in the main game.
- Day 4: Three new single contestants joined the game: Blind, Patrizia and Roberta. Two of them had to form a duo which would join the main game, while the other would go directly to Playa Sgamada. The first member of the duo would be picked by the public through a nomination, while the second member would be decided through the Fire Challenge. Blind won the public vote, while Roberta won the Fire Challenge, therefore Patrizia had to go to Playa Sgamada. Ilona was voted as the Boss of Playa Sgamada, therefore she was able to pick another contestant to go form a new duo and rejoin the main game with, she chose Roger.
- Day 8: Patrizia was revealed to have suffered burns from the Fire Challenge held on Day 4. After receiving medical care, Patrizia decided to walk out of the game for additional treatments, officially leaving the competition. Marco Me. was voted as the Boss of Playa Sgamada, therefore he was exempt from the first elimination which would happen on Day 11.
- Day 11: On Playa Sgamada, Antonio, Floriana and Jovana competed in a challenge: Jovana won, therefore Antonio and Floriana were nominated to become the first contestant officially eliminated. Later, Clemente was voted as the Boss of Playa Sgamada, therefore he could choose whether he, his wife or neither would go back into the main game, with the other (or both) having to face the public vote: he chose himself. Floriana, Jovana and Marco M. then competed in a challenge in order to determine who would become Clemente's new partner: Floriana won.
- Day 15: Upon stepping foot on the beach, Silvano used swear words and was accused of blasphemy on social media. After reviewing the footage and discussing the incident, production decided to remove him from the competition, as he had broken the rules of the game regarding the use of certain words. After Silvano's ejection, Nick had to form a new duo with a contestant from Playa Sgamada. Blind was voted as the Boss of Playa Sgamada, therefore he could choose whether he would become Nick's partner and go back into the main game or if someone else would get that chance. He chose the first, forming a new duo with Nick.
- Day 18: There was a duo switch: due to Estefanía and Roger's romantic connection, they were given the chance compete in a challenge and form a new duo. They succeeded, therefore their duo partners Ilona and Nicolas were paired up as well. Additionally, since Lory & Marco C.'s had voted for Ilona & Roger through the Judas' Kiss mechanism, their vote became null as the duo no longer existed. Laura was voted as the Boss of Playa Sgamada, therefore she was able to rejoin the main game, together with Jovana, who won a re-entry public vote.
- Day 22: The game entered a new phase where duos were disbanded and all the contestants would be divided in two teams. However, it was announced that one duo would remain joint: the duo members were given the choice to either try to stay together by winning a challenge, risking a self-vote in case of loss, or not compete in a challenge and be immediately separated. The duos of Alessandro & Carmen, Edoardo & Guendalina, Estefanía & Roger and Gustavo & Jeremias competed, with Estefanía & Roger winning and continuing their journeys as a 2-in-1 contestant. Later, one member of each duo would join one of two teams: the teams competed in an immunity challenge, and the members of the losing duos from the previous challenge were given a self-vote in case they were on the losing team. Two new contestants joined the game, Licia and Marco S., and they each joined one of two teams after nominations had been made.
- Day 64: The contestants that had joined the game before the season was extended were given the choice to either continue their journeys on the Island or walk out of the game. Four contestants decided to walk out of the game: Alessandro due to having to study for exams, Guendalina due to family reasons, Licia and Blind due to work commitments.

== Guests ==
Episode	Date	Guests
1	March 21, 2022	Cecilia Rodríguez, Delia Duran, Vito Di Pietro, Manuela Raffaetà, Clarissa Franchi, Cloè D'Arcangelo, Simona Tagli
2	March 24, 2022	Mariana Morise, Greta Tigani, Manuela Raffaetà, Clarissa Franchi, Cloè D'Arcangelo, Simona Tagli, Ignazio Moser
3	March 28, 2022	Delia Duran, Greta Tigani, Nadia Cucolo, Simona Tagli
4	31 March 2022	Manuela Raffaetà, Cloè D'Arcangelo, Pino Maddaloni, Filip Đorđević, Domiziano Secondi, Federico Perna, Luca Di Carlo, Deborah Togni, Claudia Cucolo
5	April 4, 2022	Manuela Raffaetà, Cloè D'Arcangelo, Deborah Togni, Federico Perna, Ivano Michetti, Tina Cucolo
6	April 7, 2022	Manuela Raffaetà, Cloè D'Arcangelo, Greta Tigani, Luca Di Carlo, Deborah Togni, Federico Perna, Veronica Cozzani
7	April 11, 2022	Cecilia Rodríguez, Cloè D'Arcangelo, Federico Perna
8	April 14, 2022	Luca Di Carlo, Deborah Togni, Vanessa Perna, Emanuela Tittocchia, Beatriz Marino, Federica Zacchia
9	April 18, 2022	Luca Di Carlo, Federico Perna
10	April 22, 2022	Cloè D'Arcangelo, Delia Duran, Ivano Michetti, Emanuela Tittocchia, Beatriz Marino, Federico Perna
11	April 25, 2022	Cloè D'Arcangelo, Luca Di Carlo, Federico Perna, Greta Tigani, Nadia Cucolo
12	April 29, 2022	Cloè D'Arcangelo, Emanuela Tittocchia
13	May 2, 2022	Cloè D'Arcangelo, Luca Di Carlo
14	May 6, 2022	Cloè D'Arcangelo, Luca Di Carlo, Mirko Gancitano, Michela Persico
15	May 9, 2022	Cloè D'Arcangelo, Luca Di Carlo, Mirko Gancitano
16	May 13, 2022	Luca Di Carlo, Beatriz Marino, Claudia Cucolo, Guenda Goria
17	May 16, 2022	Cloè D'Arcangelo, Luca Di Carlo, Carmelina Iannoni
18	May 20, 2022	Luca Di Carlo, Nicole Di Mario
19	May 23, 2022	Luca Di Carlo, Giuseppe Tonto, Luca Nocerino, Edoardo Panella, Luciano Tavassi
20	May 27, 2022	Luca Di Carlo, Delia Duran, Ivano Michetti
21	May 30, 2022	Luca Di Carlo, Beatriz Marino, Nadia Aghittino
22	June 6, 2022	Luca Di Carlo, Ivano Michetti, Jedà Lenfoire
23	13 June 2022	Luca Di Carlo, Federico Perna
Semifinal	June 20, 2022	Luca Di Carlo, Emma Di Pietro, Jennifer Caroletti
Final	June 27, 2022	Luca Di Carlo, Jennifer Caroletti, Carmelina Iannoni, Vanessa Perna, Marisa Daffrè, Ivano Michetti, Silvano Michetti, Tiziano Leonardi, Éva Henger

== TV Ratings ==
Episode	Date	Viewers	Share
1	March 21, 2022	3,236,000	23.26%
2	March 24, 2022	2,306,000	15.39%
3	March 28, 2022	3,074,000	20.64%
4	31 March 2022	2,380,000	15.73%
5	April 4, 2022	2,694,000	17.78%
6	April 7, 2022	2,538,000	16.84%
7	April 11, 2022	2,784,000	18.96%
8	April 14, 2022	2,394,000	16.63%
9	April 18, 2022	2,192,000	16.00%
10	April 22, 2022	2,272,000	15.49%
11	April 25, 2022	2,485,000	17.19%
12	April 29, 2022	2,463,000	17.06%
13	May 2, 2022	2,550,000	19.06%
14	May 6, 2022	2,483,000	18.26%
15	May 9, 2022	2,528,000	18.81%
16	May 13, 2022	2,388,000	19.05%
17	May 16, 2022	2,332,000	17.73%
18	May 20, 2022	2,406,000	19.23%
19	May 23, 2022	2,380,000	18.94%
20	May 27, 2022	2,204,000	18.27%
21	May 30, 2022	2,453,000	19.09%
22	June 6, 2022	2,461,000	20.50%
23	13 June 2022	2,246,000	19.02%
Semifinal	June 20, 2022	2,400,000	20.74%
Final	June 27, 2022	2,575,000	23.30%
Average		2,500,000	19.20%
