= Quel bravo ragazzo =

2016 film

- Theatrical release poster
- Directed by: Enrico Lando
- Written by: Gianluca Ansanelli; Enrico Lando; Herbert Ballerina; Andrea Agnello; Ciro Zecca
- Starring: Herbert Ballerina
- Cinematography: Massimo Schiavon
- Edited by: Giuseppe Trepiccione
- Music by: Fabio Gargiulo
- Distributed by: Medusa Film
- Release date: 17 November 2016
- Running time: 83 minutes
- Country: Italy
- Language: Italian

Quel bravo ragazzo (lit. 'Goodfella') is a 2016 Italian comedy film directed by Enrico Lando.

== Cast ==
- Herbert Ballerina as Leone Cosimato
- Tony Sperandeo as Vito Mancuso
- Enrico Lo Verso as Salvo La Mantia
- Ninni Bruschetta as Enrico Greco
- Daniela Virgilio as Sonia Morbelli
- Mario Pupella as don Alfredo Costabile
- Maccio Capatonda as don Isidoro
- Lucia Di Franco as Viola
- Beniamino Marcone as Tonino Curcio
- Sara Jahja as Maria
- Ernesto Mahieux as Genny Russo
- Giampaolo Morelli as Alfonso Marino
- Giuseppe Sallemi as Aziz
- Luigi Maria Burruano as don Ferdinando Cosimato
- Ivan La Porta as Tommaso
- Enrico Venti as the traffic policeman
- Barbara Bacci as Irina
- Jordi Mollà as the Colombian boss
- Yoon Cometti Joyce as the businessman
- Edoardo Gabbriellini as the real estate agent
