= Franco Mari =

Italian actor and comedian (1947–2025)

- Born: 23 January 1947; Milan, Italy
- Died: 25 October 2025 (aged 78); Milan, Italy
- Other name: Rupert Sciamenna
- Occupations: Actor; comedian
- Years active: 1983–2025

Franco Mari (23 January 1947 – 25 October 2025) was an Italian actor and comedian. Better known as Rupert Sciamenna, his most well-known character, he was famous for his participation in television programs such as Mai dire... on Italia 1 in many sketches with Marcello Macchia. In 2015, he appeared in the film Italiano medio. Mari died on 25 October 2025, at the age of 78.

== Filmography ==
- Mani di fata (1983)
- Lui è peggio di me (1985)
- Facciamo paradiso (1995)
- Cucciolo (1998)
- All the Moron's Men (1999)
- Italiano medio (2015)
- Omicidio all'italiana (2017)

=== TV series ===
- Intralci (2006)
- La Villa di Lato (2009)
- Drammi Medicali (2009)
- Mario (2013–2014)
