= Italiano medio =

- Directed by: Maccio Capatonda
- Screenplay by: Maccio Capatonda; Marco Alessi; Sergio Spaccavento; Danilo Carlani; Daniele Grigolo; Luigi Luciano
- Story by: Maccio Capatonda; Marco Alessi; Sergio Spaccavento
- Based on: Italiano medio short film directed by Maccio Capatonda
- Produced by: Marco Belardi
- Starring: Maccio Capatonda; Luigi Luciano; Enrico Venti; Franco Mari; Lavinia Longhi; Barbara Tabita; Nino Frassica; Paolo Noise
- Edited by: Giogiò Franchini
- Music by: Maccio Capatonda
- Distributed by: Medusa Film, Lotus Production
- Release date: 29 January 2015 (Italy)
- Running time: 100 minutes
- Country: Italy
- Language: Italian

Italiano medio (lit. "Average Italian Man") is a 2015 Italian satirical comedy film written, directed and starring Maccio Capatonda.

== Plot ==
Giulio Verme is a radical environmental activist who demonstrates against the levelling of a local park to make way for a residential area commissioned by tycoon Giancarlo Cartelloni. Giulio was born of TV-addicted parents who had been severely neglecting him throughout childhood and youth, causing him to develop a hatred for TV and everything related to it. Giulio leaves home at a young age and becomes an environmentalist, animalist and vegan. During his studies in environmental science, where he graduates with honors, he meets fellow environmentalist Franca and eventually goes to live with her.

As the years go by, Giulio becomes increasingly disillusioned with his inability to raise awareness among the people around him, including Franca herself, whom he judges not coherent enough with her own ideals. After Franca leaves to do volunteering for two weeks, Giulio is visited by his schoolmate Alfonzo, now a door-to-door salesman, who tries to cheer Giulio up by administering a pill that temporarily reduces human brain usage to 2%. Under the influence of the drug, Giulio instantly becomes a thoughtless, vulgar, narcissistic womanizer: he cheats on Franca with his neighbor Sharon, then has Alfonzo take him to an exclusive nightclub, where he impersonates former footballer Ruud Gullit. Giulio later borrows the bouncer's Hummer and crashes it into a tree in the very same park he had been trying to save, then he steals an excavator and uses it to further vandalize the park.

The next day Giulio wakes up, having regained his consciousness, to the news that his vandalism acts have earned the park great attention by the media and public opinion, thus putting Cartelloni's levelling plans on hold. Giulio surmises that the only way to raise public awareness is through eco-terrorism. He joins an environmental NGO that plans to contaminate the city's water supply with large amounts of waste, so that citizens would understand the value of water. In order to reach the mindset to commit the reckless act, Giulio obtains more pills from Alfonzo, however he becomes addicted to the drug and trapped inside his newfound "average Italian" lifestyle, marrying Sharon and completely overturning his life. Giulio is noticed in this state by the talent scouts of the popular reality show Master VIP and accepts their offer to participate in the competition, eventually working his way up to the finals. Franca returns home and, after learning from Sharon and Alfonzo about the recent events, she takes them with her to the TV studio to attend the Master VIP finale.

Master VIP finalists are required to break from their past and everyone connected to it, thereby truly becoming VIPs: Giulio must divorce Sharon and cut ties with Franca and Alfonzo. Initially he complies, until Franca and Alfonzo reveal that he has been acting so recklessly of his own volition: the pills never existed and were a product of Giulio's own imagination to justify his behavior. Giulio briefly comes to his senses, addresses the audience and delivers an incoherent, ranting speech where both his personalities alternately prevail: this impresses Cartelloni, who is a judge in the show and instantly declares Giulio the winner. Giulio hallucinates about his negligent parents and tries to run towards them: he crashes into the camera, faints and falls into a coma.

While Giulio is hospitalized, a psychologist explains that his mind is manifesting a split personality, due to years of repressing his latent desire to embrace conformity. As Giulio awakens from his coma, he understands the importance of compromise, which is often a necessity to get things done in Italy. He therefore finds a new way to save the park by exploiting his newly gained popularity: with Cartelloni's approval, he launches a new reality show where competitors are tasked with rebuilding the park using gardening tools.

== Cast ==
- Maccio Capatonda as Giulio Verme / Antonino Verme / Mariottide
- Herbert Ballerina as Alfonzo Scarabocchi / Filomena Leccamuli / Pino Cammino
- Ivo Avido as Pippo / Tamarro / Buttafuori
- Lavinia Longhi as Franca Solidale
- Barbara Tabita as Sharon Pacchianotti
- Rupert Sciamenna as Giancarlo Cartelloni
- Gabriella Franchini as Rita Levati Mocassini
- Francesco Sblendorio as Ermanno Calcinacci
- Rodolfo D’Andrea as Rodolfo Purtroppi
- Adelaide Manselli as Marinella Sgarri
- Nino Frassica as The Doctor
- Luca Confortini as Manto di neve
- Pippo Lorusso as Armando
- Raul Cremona as The Illusionist
- Paolo Noise as Kevin
