= Station Horizon =

- Genre: Dramedy
- Created by: Pierre-Adrian Irlé; Romain Graf
- Country of origin: Switzerland
- Original language: French
- No. of seasons: 1
- No. of episodes: 7

Production
- Running time: 48 minutes

Original release
- Network: RTS Un
- Release: February 28 – April 11, 2015

Station Horizon is a Swiss TV show that originally aired on RTS Un. It is a dramedy set in Valais, in a small town inspired by American culture. Internationally, Station Horizon is broadcast on SBS On Demand in Australia, and Netflix in the United States. The series was shown at the 2015 Montreal World Film Festival.

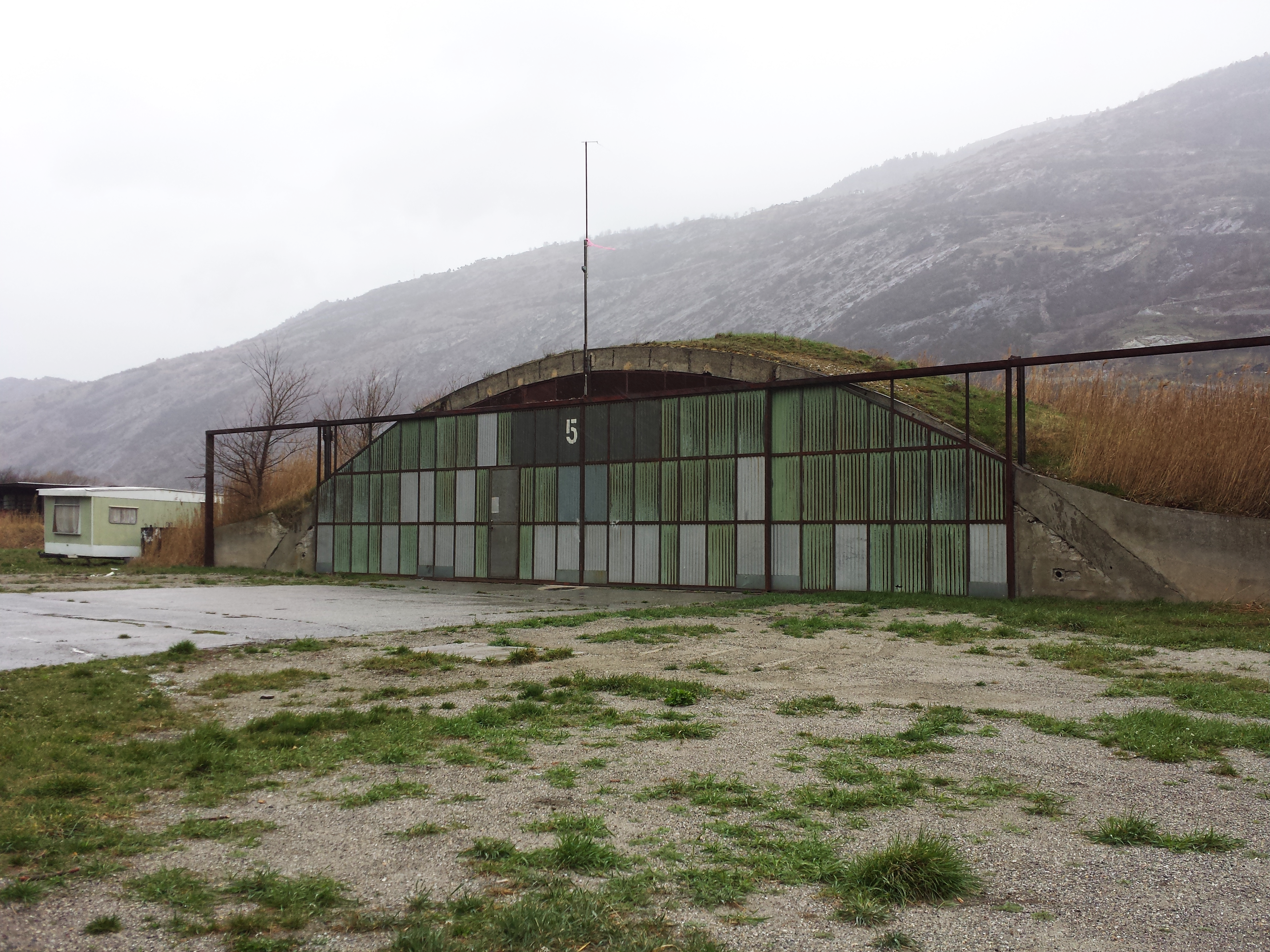
Bunker used as set for Station Horizon

== Cast ==
- Bernard Yerlès as Joris Fragnière
- Roland Vouilloz as Raymond Héritier
- Gaspard Boesch as Charly Fragnière
- Alexandra Vandernoot as Nicole Héritier
- Marie Fontannaz as Jessy Rouiller
- Lavinia Longhi as Cheyenne Morales
- Baptiste Gilliéron as Bernard Héritier
- Klaudio Hila as Elvis Behrami
- Mélissa Aymon as Axelle Fragnière
- Anna Pieri as Suzy Fragnière
- Yoann Blanc as Karl-Heinz Imboden
- Charlotte Nagel as Géraldine Germanier
- Jean-Marc Morel as Martin Troillet also known as Père Maurice
- Jean-Pierre Gos as Henri Lambiel also known as Riton
- Thierry Meury as Jean-Michel Germanier also known as Jean-Mi
- Maria Mettral as Freddie Rouiller
- Baptiste Coustenoble as Werner Besse
- Berner Biermeier as Willy Frösch
- Pierre Aucaigne as George Lathion
- Christian Mukuna as Yannick Bolomey also known as Yaya
- James Gattuso as Léonard
- Yann Schmidhalter as Gabi
- Hélène Patricio as Raluca
- Antonio Buil as Jésus Pinto
