= Marco Mazzoli =

Italian radio presenter

- Born: Marco Donatello Mazzoli; October 20, 1972 (age 53); Milan, Lombardy, Italy
- Occupations: Radio host, Actor, Comedian
- Years active: 1990–present
- Spouse: Stefania Pittaluga (2010–)

Marco Donatello Mazzoli (Milan, Italy, 20 October 1972) is an Italian radio host. He is known for conducting the radio program Lo Zoo di 105 on Radio 105 Network. Marco has always said to be inspired by the style of Howard Stern. Like Howard, Marco has had several fines from Agcom (the Italian Federal Communications Commission) due to dirty talk and many lawsuits from sponsors and some celebrities.

== Career ==
=== Early career ===
Raised in Los Angeles, where his father Claudio worked as art director for the Walt Disney Company, Marco Mazzoli began his career in local radio starting in Lombardy, as Rovaradio Alta Brianza, Como Radio City, Radio Sei Milano, Radio Kelly Milano, Radio Play Rta, Radio Delta International and Radio Lombardia. From 1993 to 1995 he worked for RTL 102.5, Radio Capital (1995–1996) in tandem with DJ Angelo, then StationOne (1996–1998) with Dj Monta Mix and Mago Wender. In this radio experience Marco Mazzoli began to give rise to situations such as Bastard Inside Line, whose unique style is the main source of success of programs that currently leads.

=== Radio 105 Network ===
In 1998 he began a collaboration with Radio 105 Network, where he led a program broadcast on weekends; past the New York office, opened in early 1999, has conducted for 6 months 105 New York, with Camila Raznovich. Returning from the United States, he has designed and conducted Lo Zoo di 105. At the end of 2005 the program has become the most listened in Italy in its time slot, surpassing the program of Radio Deejay, Deejay Time led by Albertino and currently it's the program with the largest number of listeners in fifteen minutes.

=== Other projects ===
In 2008 he won first prize at the Montecarlo Film Festival (Angel Award) with his first screenplay entitled "The Theory". His first film is about a theory about human existence on earth. On 26 August 2010 in Miami he married his wife Stefania, and on 21 September 2011 his autobiography was released, entitled Radiografia di un DJ che non piace (X-ray of a DJ who is not liked), published by Rizzoli. In November 2012 his second book "Non Mollare Mai" ("Never Give Up") (Mondadori) was released. This is the chronicle of Mazzoli's radio program "Lo Zoo di 105", which is the most popular radio program in Italy (over 1.1 million listeners every 15 minutes as of November 2012). The emphasis of the book is on the DJ's success despite the cut-throat competition and the hurdles imposed by strict censuring agencies.

From 2015 he owns Revolution 93.5 Fm Miami, the number 1 dance Music station based in Miami and broadcasting throughout all South Florida on 93.5 Fm and 104.3 Fm Hd 4.

As from 23 December 2013 he hosts a show called "The Italian Brunch" on REvolution 93.5, a Miami-based radio station that plays only dance music.

== Television experiences ==
Among the many co-conduction and conduction on the small screen, Mazzoli has achieved the zero episode of "The Zoo on TV", never aired, conducted together with Fabio Alisei and Paolo Noise trade winds, with brief appearances by Leone Di Lernia and Elisabetta Canalis. Short clips of the episode zero can be seen in the DVD attached to one of the five numbers of the monthly "Zoo Magazine" released between 2005 and 2006 in the Italian newsstands. Since 2008, the 105 Zoo also airs on TV on channel Sky Comedy Central, experiment that led the program for a short period of time in 2009, also on MTV.

- Videomusic - Caos Time 1994 - 1996 (conduction)
- Rai Uno - Festival di Castrocaro 1995 (co-conduction)
- Italia 1 - Winter Park 1995 (co-conduction)
- Rai 2 - Mio Capitano 1997 (conduction)
- Rai 3 - Numero Zero 1997 (co-conduction)
- Match Music - Bar Show 1999 (conduction)
- Italia 1 - Express 1999 (co-conduction)
- Italia 1 - Night EXPRESS 2000 (co-conduction)
- Italia 1 - Beach Party 2000 (co-conduction)
- Rai 2 - My Compilation 2002 (co-conduction)
- Odeon TV - Sexy Boxy 2005 (conduction in voice)
- Canale 5 - Striscia la notizia June 2006 - June 2007 ( envoy)
- Comedy Central - Lo Zoo di 105 2008 - in corso (conduction)
- MTV - Lo Zoo di 105 September 2009 - December 2009 (conduction)
- MTV - Mario 2013 - 2014 (special guest)

== Filmography ==
- Mario (2013)
- On Air: Storia di un successo (2016)
- The Tracker (2018)
- Sesso e altro inconvenienti (2019)
- Ritorno al presente (2022)
