= Omicidio all'italiana =

- Directed by: Maccio Capatonda
- Screenplay by: Maccio Capatonda; Gianluca Ansanelli; Herbert Ballerina; Daniele Grigolo; Danilo Carlani; Sergio Spaccavento
- Story by: Maccio Capatonda; Gianluca Ansanelli; Sergio Spaccavento
- Produced by: Marco Belardi
- Starring: Maccio Capatonda; Herbert Ballerina; Sabrina Ferilli; Enrico Venti; Lorenza Guerrieri; Antonia Truppo; Nino Frassica; Ninni Bruschetta; Franco Mari
- Edited by: Giogiò Franchini
- Music by: Lorenzo Tomio
- Distributed by: Medusa Film
- Release date: 2 March 2017
- Running time: 1h 39min
- Country: Italy
- Language: Italian

Omicidio all'italiana (Homicide Italian Style) is a 2017 Italian comedy film directed by Maccio Capatonda.

== Plot ==
In the small village of Acitrullo the inhabitants live a simple and monotonous life. Mayor Piero Peluria does not know how to change the monotony, but has a brilliant idea when the old Countess Ugalda Martiro In Cazzati dies, choked by the dinner. The mayor, with the complicity of his brother Marino, makes the TV believe that it is a homicide, so that the village comes out of anonymity and becomes famous throughout Italy.

== Cast ==
- Maccio Capatonda as Piero Peluria / Eugenio Normale / Filippo Bello
- Herbert Ballerina as Marino Peluria
- Gigio Morra as Commissioner Fiutozzi
- Roberta Mattei as Sandra Pertinente
- Ivo Avido as officer Farina
- Fabrizio Biggio as Antonello
- Lorenza Guerrieri as Countess Ugalda Martirio In Cazzati
- Ninni Bruschetta as the tour operator
- Christian Iansante as Dr. Squartati
- Antonia Truppo as Fabiola Normale
- Nino Frassica as Aldo
- Sabrina Ferilli as Donatella Spruzzone
- Gabriella Anna Rapposelli as Congetta
- Ektor Baboden as Congetto
- Massimo Picozzi as the professor
- Rupert Sciamenna as San Ceppato
- Pippo Lorusso as Salvo Errori
