= Lo Zoo di 105 =

- Genre: Comedy / entertainment
- Country of origin: Italy
- Language: Italian
- Home station: Radio 105 Network
- TV adaptations: Comedy Central Italy
- Starring: Marco Mazzoli, Fabio Alisei, Paolo Noise, Enrico Venti, Marcello Macchia, Luigi Luciano, DJ Wender
- Created by: Marco Mazzoli, DJ Wender, Gilberto Penza, Leone Di Lernia
- Recording studio: Milan, Italy; Miami, U.S.
- Original release: 1999 – present
- Website: zoo.105.net
- Podcast: Zoobest

Lo Zoo di 105 (Italian pronunciation: [lo dˈdzɔːo di ˌtʃɛntoˈtʃiŋkwe]) is a radio program created by the Italian radio host Marco Mazzoli and broadcast on Radio 105 Network. The program is based on numerous impersonation of famous people and popular films and TV shows, prank calls and dirty talk. The show was interrupted many times due to numerous complaints and the last time due to alleged "political pressure", later revealed false. According to an Il Sole 24 Ore survey, in 2004 was the most appreciated radio show from an audience between 12 and 29 years of age. In the spring of 2004, the Italian showgirl Elisabetta Canalis took part in several episodes of the radio broadcast. On 17 December 2009, Benjamin McKenzie and, on 6 June 2014, David Hasselhoff participated in Lo Zoo di 105 as guest stars. In 2010 Lo Zoo di 105 started airing the longest prank call ever, named Alan in love. In this prank, Alan Caligiuri (a former host of the show) called several elderly people from all around Italy searching for love and he eventually found one. The prank is still ongoing. In March 2016 was released a movie about the story of the show: On Air – Storia di un successo.
