= Divino Otelma =

Italian politician

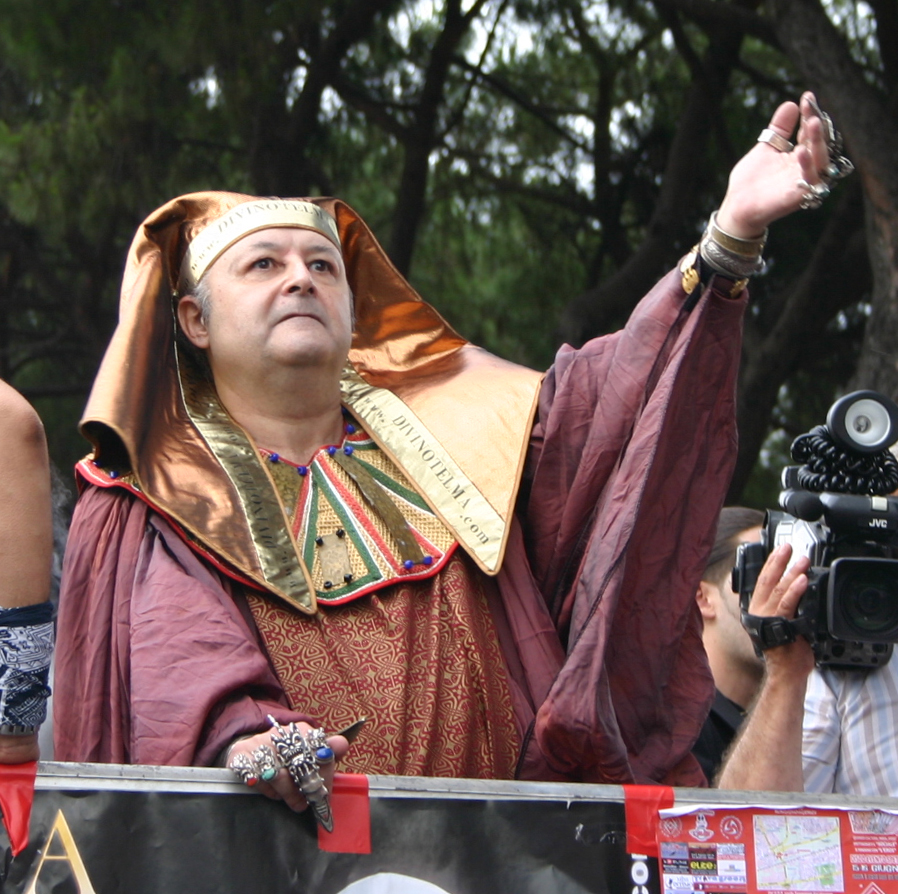
- Divino Otelma
- Born: Marco Amleto Belelli; 8 May 1949 (age 77); Genoa, Italy
- Website: divinotelma.com

Marco Amleto Belelli, or Divino Otelma, (born 8 May 1949) is an Italian television personality, politician and singer.

== Biography ==
In 1965 Belelli joined the Giovane Italia (an organization near to the Italian Social Movement), but in 1967 became a member of the Christian Democracy and of the Workers' Christian Movement. In 1975 he took the degree in political science in Genoa and joined the ISPI school in Milan. In the same year he started to appreciate the Radical Party and its leader Marco Pannella.

In 1977, he became a magician and named himself Otelma, that is the opposite of his middle name (later he would change it in divino Otelma), and began to join different television programs. Divino Otelma says he believes in reincarnation and says that he is the incarnation of God and that he was in the past a priest from Atlantis, a woman pharaoh and one of the Quindecimviri sacris faciundis. He defines himself Count of Quistello, First Theurgist of the Church of the Livings, Great Master of the Theurgical Order of Helios, European President of the Order of Occultists of Europe, National President of the Order of Italian Occultists, President of the Italian Centre of Astrological Studies and of the Astrological-Occultist Union of Italy, Source of Life and Salvation, Dispenser of Archetypal Truth, Light of Livings.

In 1991, he founded the political party Europa 2000 and in 2003 he took his second degree, in history.

== Works ==
- Il libro dei segreti, Genova, Il Basilisco, 1984
- Il Libro di Orion o del Domani Perfetto, Genova, Il Basilisco, 1985
- Magia, Genova, Il Basilisco, 1993
- La magia del Terzo millennio, Roma, L'Airone, 2000, ISBN 88-7944-485-9.
- Occasus mundi. Teorie sulla fine del mondo, Genova, ECIG, 2013, ISBN 978-88-7544-238-5.

== Discography ==
- Potenza sessuale 3000, Bit Records, 2005 (cd)
- Prendi la fortuna, Bit Records, 2005 (cd)
- Il CD divino, Bit Records, 2006 (album)
- Escluso, Bit Records, 2008 (ep)
- Ti voglio, Senza Base Records, 2010 (cd)
- The best of Il Divino Otelma, Senza Base Records, 2012 ("Utor Kalem")
- Baia del sol, Bit Records, 2012 (cd with "Rossano Rubicondi")
- Mai dire Maya, Bit Records, 2012 (cd)

== Sources ==
- Biography
