= Lavinia Longhi =

Italian actress (born 1980)

- Born: 18 March 1980 (age 46); Mariano Comense, Italy
- Occupation: Actress
- Years active: 2005-present

Lavinia Longhi (born 18 March 1980) is an Italian actress. She was born in Mariano Comense, to an Italian father and a Montenegrin mother. She appeared in more than twenty films since 2005.

== Selected filmography ==
Year	Title	Role	Notes
2010	Signora Enrica	Valentina	
2012	The Immature: The Trip	Rita	
2015	Station Horizon	Cheyenne Morales	
2015	Italiano medio	Franca Solidale	
