= Herbert Ballerina =

Italian radio host and actor (born 1980)

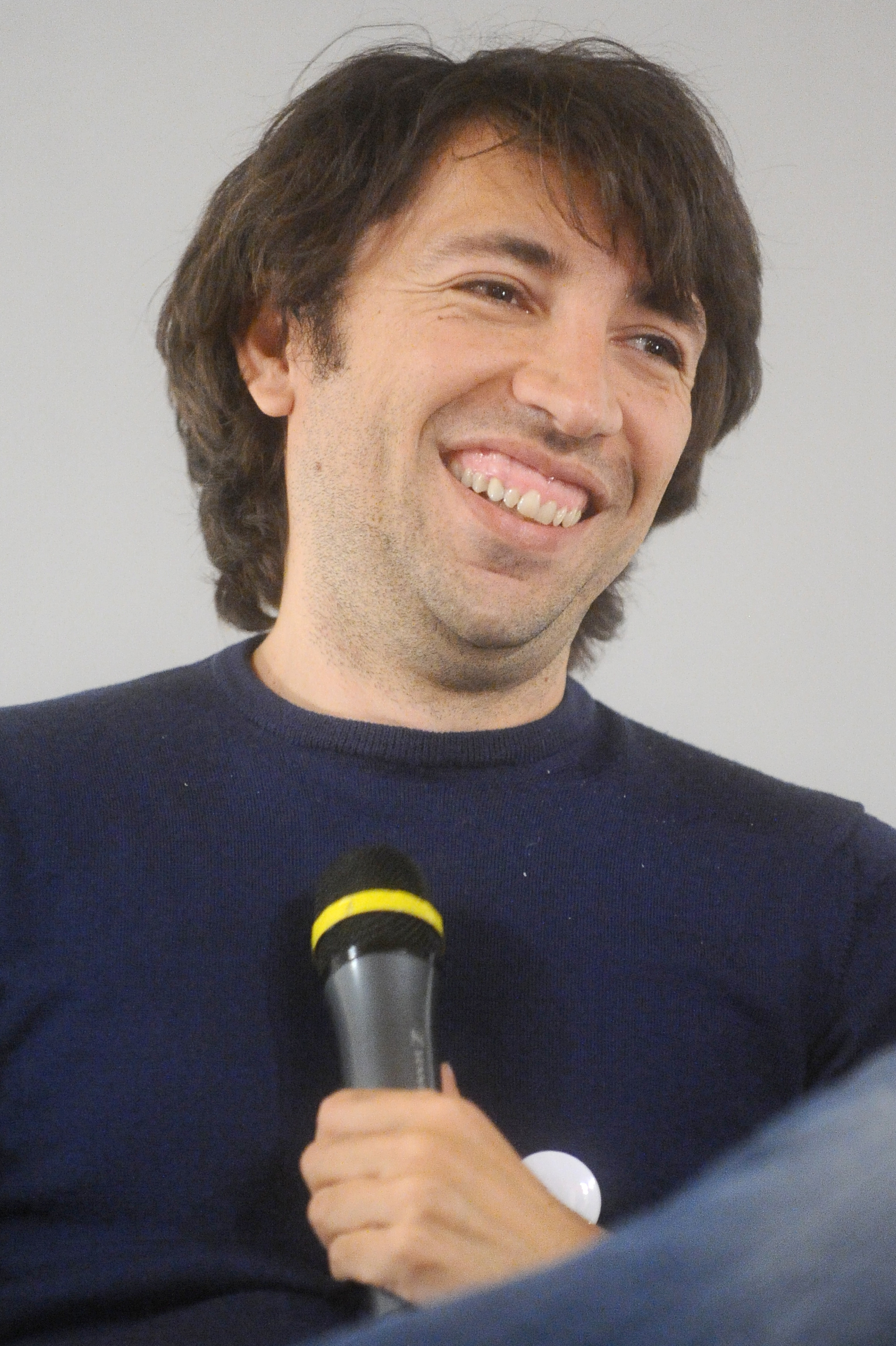
- Born: Luigi Luciano; 7 March 1980 (age 46); Campobasso, Molise, Italy
- Occupations: Actor; comedian
- Years active: 2009–present
- Height: 1.73 m (5 ft 8 in)

Luigi Luciano (born 7 March 1980), better known by his stage name Herbert Ballerina, is an Italian radio host, comedian and actor. Since January 2011, he has been that radio show co-host of the Lo Zoo di 105 broadcast by Radio 105 Network.

== Career ==
Luciano enrolled at the DAMS (Disciplines of Arts, Music, and Entertainment) in Bologna, where he graduated in 2007. Later he moved to Milan, where he joined Shortcut Productions, initially as an assistant production and later as an actor and author. With Marcello Macchia he was protagonist of many comics trailers that make him famous and easily recognizable to the public for his innate humor. In 2010 he was contacted by Checco Zalone to play in his film Che bella giornata. Since 2011 he is the speaker for Lo Zoo di 105. In 2017 he hosted Prima Festival, the pre-show related to Sanremo Music Festival 2017.

== Filmography ==
=== Film ===
Year	Title	Role(s)	Notes
2011	What a Beautiful Day	Giovanni	
2015	Italiano medio	Alfonso Scarabocchi / Filomena Leccamuli / Gino Cammino	
2016	On Air - Storia di un successo	Himself	Cameo appearance
2016	Quel bravo ragazzo	Leone Cosimato	
2017	Omicidio all'italiana	Marino Peluria	
2018	Natale a Roccaraso	Receptionist	Short film
2019	L'agenzia dei bugiardi	Diego	
2019	Appena un minuto	Simone	
2020	In vacanza su Marte	Pippo Anselmi	
2021	The Legend of the Christmas Witch 2: The Origins	Marmotta	
2022	Beata te	Date #3	Cameo appearance
2023	Il viaggio leggendario	Sir. Rimualdo	
2025	Make a Wish	Michele	
2026	Un weekend artificiale		

=== Television ===
Year	Title	Role(s)	Notes
2012	South Park	TSA Operator (voice)	Episode: "Reverse Cowgirl"
2013–2014	Mario	Various characters	34 episodes
2014	Testa di calcio - Herbert in Brasile	Himself / Host	Reality show
2016	Mariottide	Fernandello	20 episodes
2018	The Generi	Geromalo	3 episodes
2021	Tutta colpa di Freud	Giulio	Episode: "Episode 8"
2023	LOL - Chi ride è fuori	Himself / Contestant	Reality show
2023–2025	Stasera tutto è possibile	Himself / Contestant	Game show

=== Web ===
Year	Title	Role(s)	Notes
2009	Leggerezze	Arturo Braciola	12 episodes
2009	Sexy Spies	Don Dossena	10 episodes
2009–2010	Drammi medicali	Dr. Nello Giordano	20 episodes
2010	La villa di Lato	Prancesco	11 episodes
2012	Babbala and the Idiot Guy	Idiot guy	10 episodes
2015	Bob Torrent	Licio Chiss Me	10 episodes
