= Max Laudadio =

Italian television presenter

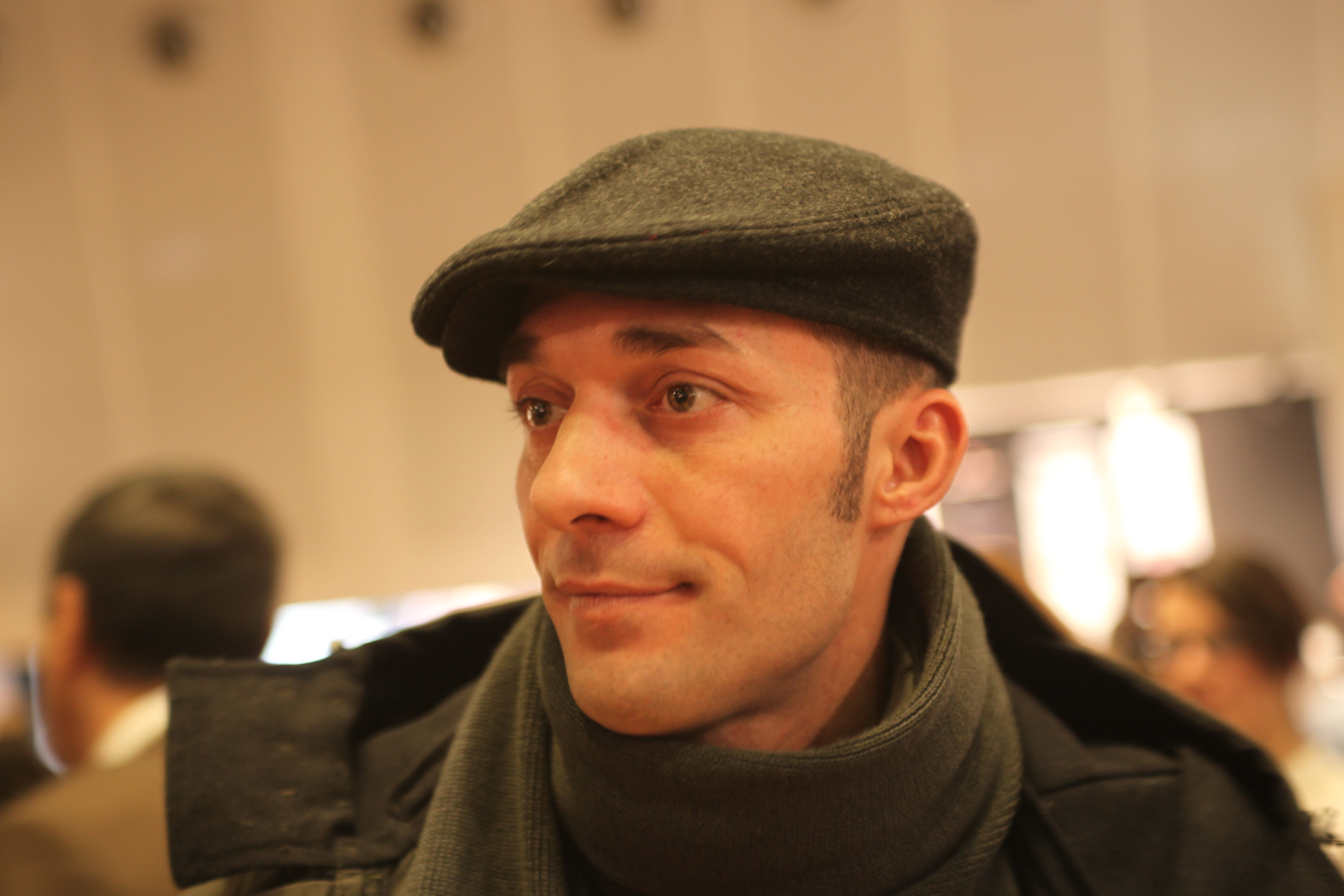
Max Laudadio

Max Laudadio (born Massimiliano Laudadio in Pistoia, Italy, 30 August 1971) is an Italian television presenter, actor and radio host, known as a correspondent for the program Striscia la Notizia on Canale 5.

== Career ==
=== Radio and TV ===
He was the author of several programs for the Italian Disney Channel in 1999, and in the same year he also conducted music programs on Match Music. From 2001 to 2002, on Rai Radio 2, has led directly the program Il Tropico del Cammello. In 2006 led directly to RTL 102.5 Chi C'è C'è Chi Non C'è, Non Parla and Tanto Domani È Domenica and from 2007 to 2008 Il Ficcanaso (The Snoop). From 2000 to 2003 took part in the cast of Le Iene, but since 2003 takes the same role in Striscia la Notizia.

=== Other projects ===
Furthermore, he was also an actor, protagonist of La bisbetica domata and Molto rumore per nulla (1998), leading actor in musical Cain and Abel (1999) and Studio 54 (2005), leading actor in La morte dei comici (2005). He participated in the ING Direct advertising spots in TV, Mocha Moment and Jenne. In 2011 he participates in the program Baila! as a competitor, paired with the singer Marcella Bella.
