= Soleil Sorge =

Italian and American showgirl, television personality and model (born 1994)

- Born: Soleil Anastasia Sorge; 5 July 1994 (age 32); Los Angeles, California, U.S.
- Citizenship: Italy; United States
- Occupations: Television personality; model
- Years active: 2014–present
- Height: 1.73 m (5 ft 8.11 in)

Soleil Anastasia Sorge (born 5 July 1994) is an Italian and American television personality and model. She became widely known only through her participation in Italian reality television programmes, including L'isola dei famosi, Pechino Express and Grande Fratello VIP.

== Early life ==
Sorge was born in Los Angeles to American mother, Wendy Kay and Italian father, Paolo Sorge. She grew up in the United States and later moved to Italy after completing high school, where she continued her education and began developing her television career.

According to Mediaset, she has a background in business and acting-related training and experience in public speaking and sports presenting. She later studied economics at Sapienza University of Rome.

Over the years, she has stated that she has cultivated interests related to sports, artistic activities and wellness.

== Career ==
=== Early work ===
In 2014, Sorge appeared as a contestant in the beauty pageant Miss Italia, broadcast on La7.

In 2015, she hosted Roma Now on Roma TV, produced in collaboration with NBC.

In 2016, she appeared in the music video Il mio vizio by Eman, and in 2017 in Mi fai innamorare with Astol.

=== Reality television and entertainment ===
In 2019, she competed in the fourteenth season of the reality show L'isola dei famosi on Canale 5.

From 11 February to 24 March 2020, she competed in the eighth season of Pechino Express – Le stagioni dell'Oriente on Rai 2, paired with her mother Wendy Kay.

In 2020, she appeared as a recurring guest commentator on the Mediaset talk shows Pomeriggio Cinque, Domenica Live and Live – Non è la d'Urso.

In 2021, she appeared on TV8's Guess My Age – Indovina l'età.

From 2021 to 2022, she took part in the sixth season of Grande Fratello VIP on Canale 5.

In 2022, she appeared as a guest opinionist on Tiki Taka – La repubblica del pallone on Italia 1.

In 2022, she appeared on Le Iene on Italia 1.

In 2022, she was selected as a judge on La pupa e il secchione Show on Italia 1.

Later in 2022, she returned to L'isola dei famosi as a guest in a special "pirate" role together with Vera Gemma.

In 2022, she appeared on TV8's Alessandro Borghese – Celebrity Chef (episode pairing: Soleil Sorge vs Dayane Mello).

Between 2022 and 2023, she hosted the digital companion show GF VIP Party on Mediaset Infinity.

In 2023, she served as a judge on Un armadio per due on La5.

In 2023, she joined the cast of the second season of Back to School on Italia 1.

In 2023, she was reported as a co-host of the Rai 2 programme Felicità.

== Business activities ==
Sorge is the founder of the brand State of Soleil. Through the brand, she has carried out collaborations with companies including Yamamay and El Vaquero.

== Television programs ==
- Miss Italia (La7, 2014)
- Roma Now (Roma TV, 2015)
- L'isola dei famosi (Canale 5, 2019, 2022)
- Pechino Express – Le stagioni dell'Oriente (Rai 2, 2020)
- Pomeriggio Cinque (Canale 5, 2020)
- Domenica Live (Canale 5, 2020)
- Live – Non è la d'Urso (Canale 5, 2020–2021)
- Guess My Age – Indovina l'età (TV8, 2021)
- Grande Fratello VIP (Canale 5, 2021–2022)
- Tiki Taka – La repubblica del pallone (Italia 1, 2022)
- Le Iene (Italia 1, 2022)
- La pupa e il secchione Show (Italia 1, 2022)
- Alessandro Borghese – Celebrity Chef (TV8, 2022)
- GF VIP Party (Mediaset Infinity, 2022–2023)
- Un armadio per due (La5, 2023)
- Back to School (Italia 1, 2023)
- Felicità (Rai 2, 2023)
- The Unknown - Fino all’ultimo bivio (Rai 2, 2026)

== Filmography ==
=== Music videos ===
- Il mio vizio (Eman, 2016)
- Mi fai innamorare (Astol, 2017)

== Publications ==
- Il manuale della stronza (2022), Sperling & Kupfer.
