= Albertino =

Albertino is a given name. Notable people with the name include:

- Albertino Barisoni (1587–1667), Italian writer, poet, Bishop of Ceneda
- Albertino Bragança (born 1944), Santomean politician
- Albertino Morosini (Podestà of Constantinople), 13th-century Venetian nobleman and administrator
- Albertino Essers (born 1969), Dutch professional darts player
- Albertino Etchechury (born 1936), Uruguayan middle-distance runner
- Albertino Mamba or Alberto Mamba (born 1994), Mozambican athlete competing primarily in the 800 metres
- Albertino Morosini (1240–1305), Venetian nobleman and statesman
- Albertino Mussato (1261–1329), statesman, poet, historian and playwright from Padua
- Albertino Pereira (born 1950), simply Albertino, a Portuguese retired footballer
- Albertino Piazza (1490–1528), Italian painter
- Nuno Albertino Varela Tavares (born 2000), Portuguese professional footballer

== See also ==
- Forte Albertino, alpine fortress in Vinadio, Piedmont, northern Italy
- Statuto Albertino, the constitution granted by King Charles Albert of Sardinia to the Kingdom of Sardinia on 4 March 1848
