= Marco Maddaloni =

Italian judoka (born 1984)

Personal information
- Born: 7 December 1984 (age 41)
- Occupation: Judoka

Sport
- Country: Italy
- Sport: Judo
- Weight class: –73 kg

Achievements and titles
- European Champ.: 5th (2008)
Medal record
Men's judo
Representing Italy
European U23 Championships
Gold medal – first place	2004 Ljubljana	–73 kg
Gold medal – first place	2005 Kyiv	–73 kg
European Junior Championships
Silver medal – second place	2003 Sarajevo	–73 kg

Profile at external databases
- IJF: 2244
- JudoInside.com: 12522
- Updated on 10 February 2022

Marco Maddaloni (born 7 December 1984 in Naples) is an Italian judoka.

== Biography ==
Marco Maddaloni, 177 cm tall, under-73 kg Italian judoka, was born in Naples on 7 December 1984 as the third and youngest child of Giovanni Maddaloni and Caterina Iuliano. His father Giovanni ran the local Judo Club Star Napoli, where his elder brother Pino and sister Laura were already vigorously training at the time he was born. In 2002, at age 17, he became absolute champion of Republica Italiana in the under-73 category, an unprecedented record. In the following year Marco became European Junior vice-champion, and in 2004 and 2005 he won back-to-back European under-23 championships. Other than judo, Marco was a carabiniere 2003–2004, and as of 2005 he is a member of the Italian police. In early 2009 he appeared as a photo-model on a cover of a nationwide magazine.

Maddaloni is involved in the cast of the 2019 Italian edition of L'isola dei famosi.

== Achievements ==
Seven times Italian judo champion for age (of which 3 times Italian champion all age); 2002, absolute judo champion of Italy at 17 years of age( the youngest of all time) 2003, European junior judo vice-champion, Sarajevo; 2004, European under-23 judo champion, Ljubljana; 2005, European under-23 judo champion, Kyiv; 2005, absolute judo champion of Italy; 2008, 5th place in the European Championships, Lisboa; 2008, 3rd place in the World Cup, Tbilisi; 2008, 3rd place in the World Cup, Vienna

== Medals overview ==
Medals overview G S B Continental Titles U23: 2 0 0 World Cups: 0 0 2 Continental junior Titles: 0 1 0 National Ch. Titles: 3 1 1 National Ch. Titles U20: 2 0 2
