= Enrico Venti =

Italian actor and comedian

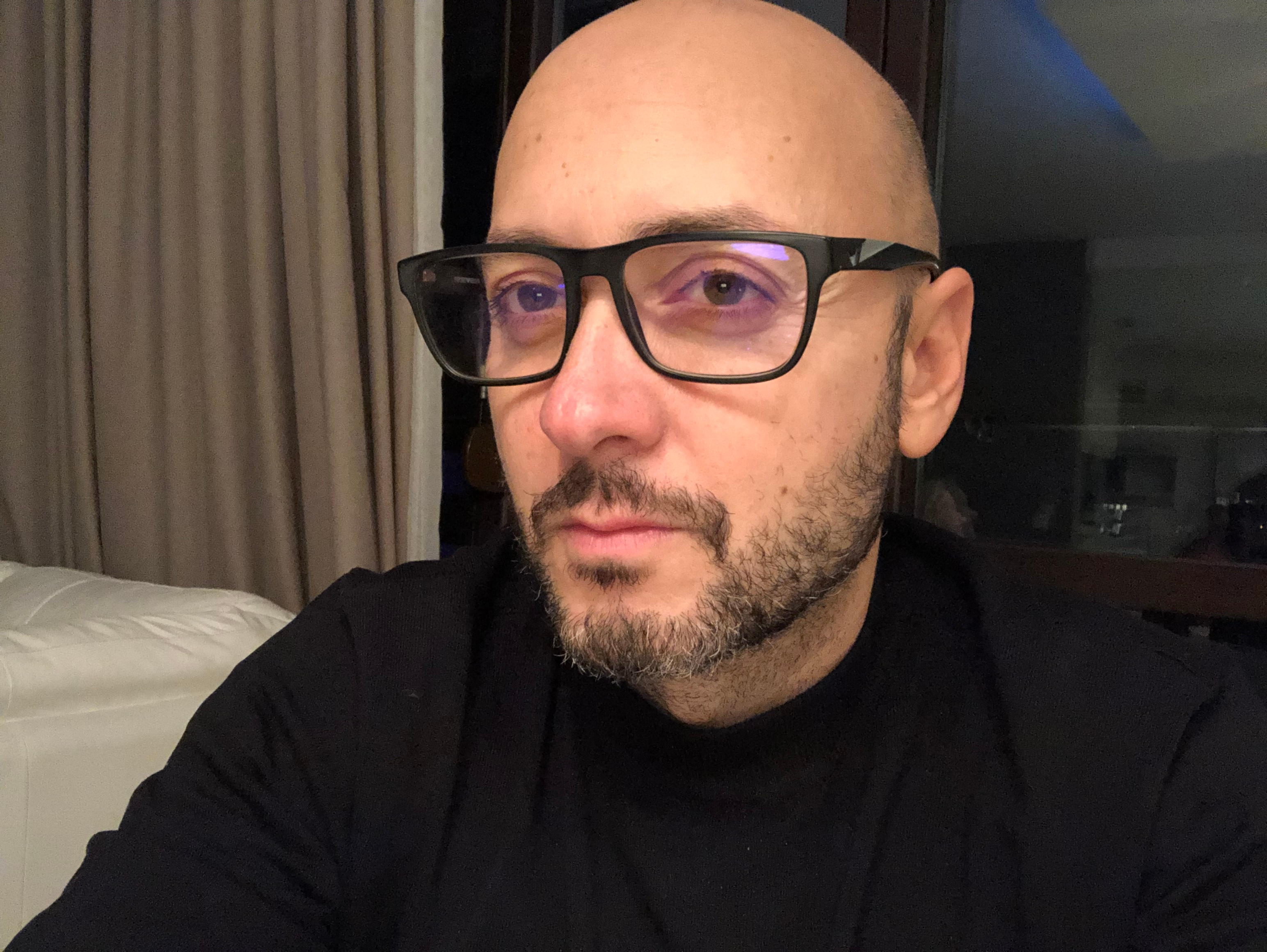
- Born: 30 December 1978 (age 47); Chieti, Abruzzo, Italy
- Occupations: Actor, comedian
- Years active: 2005–present
- Website: MaccioCapatondaTv

Enrico Venti (born 30 December 1978) is an Italian actor and comedian. Better known as Ivo Avido, his best known character, he is famous for his participation in television programs such as Mai dire... on Italia 1. With Marcello Macchia, he leads Shortcut Productions, the company that produces their own videos. From 2011 he is a member of the crew of Lo Zoo di 105.

In 2015 he took part in his first movie, Italiano medio.

== Filmography ==
- Italiano medio (2015)
- On Air: Storia di un successo (2016)
- Quel bravo ragazzo (2016)
- Omicidio all'italiana (2017)

=== TV Series ===
- La Villa di Lato (2009)
- Drammi Medicali (2009)
- Lost in Google (2012)
- Mario (2013-2014)
