= DJ Wender =

Italian DJ (born 1973)

Wender
- Born: Vincenzo Giannatempo; 19 December 1973 (age 52); Turin, Italy
- Occupations: Radio host, Deejay
- Years active: 1997–present
- Children: 2

Vincenzo Giannatempo (Turin, Italy, 19 December 1973), better known as Wender or Mago Wender is an Italian deejay, radio host, known for the radio programs Lo Zoo di 105 on Radio 105 Network and Asganaway on Radio Deejay.

== Filmography ==
=== Movies ===
- On Air: Storia di un successo (2016)
