= Paolo Noise =

Italian radio host (born 1974)

- Born: Paolo Federico Nocito; 8 September 1974 (age 51); Milan, Lombardy, Italy
- Occupations: Radio host, Comedian
- Years active: 1999–present

Paolo Federico Nocito (Milan, Italy, 8 September 1974), better known as Paolo Noise is an Italian radio host, known for the radio programs Lo Zoo di 105 on Radio 105 Network and Asganaway on Radio Deejay.

== Filmography ==
=== Movies ===
- Italiano medio, (2015)
- On Air: Storia di un successo (2016)

=== TV Series ===
- Via Massena, (2011–2012)
