= Maccio Capatonda =

Italian comedian, actor, and filmmaker (born 1978)

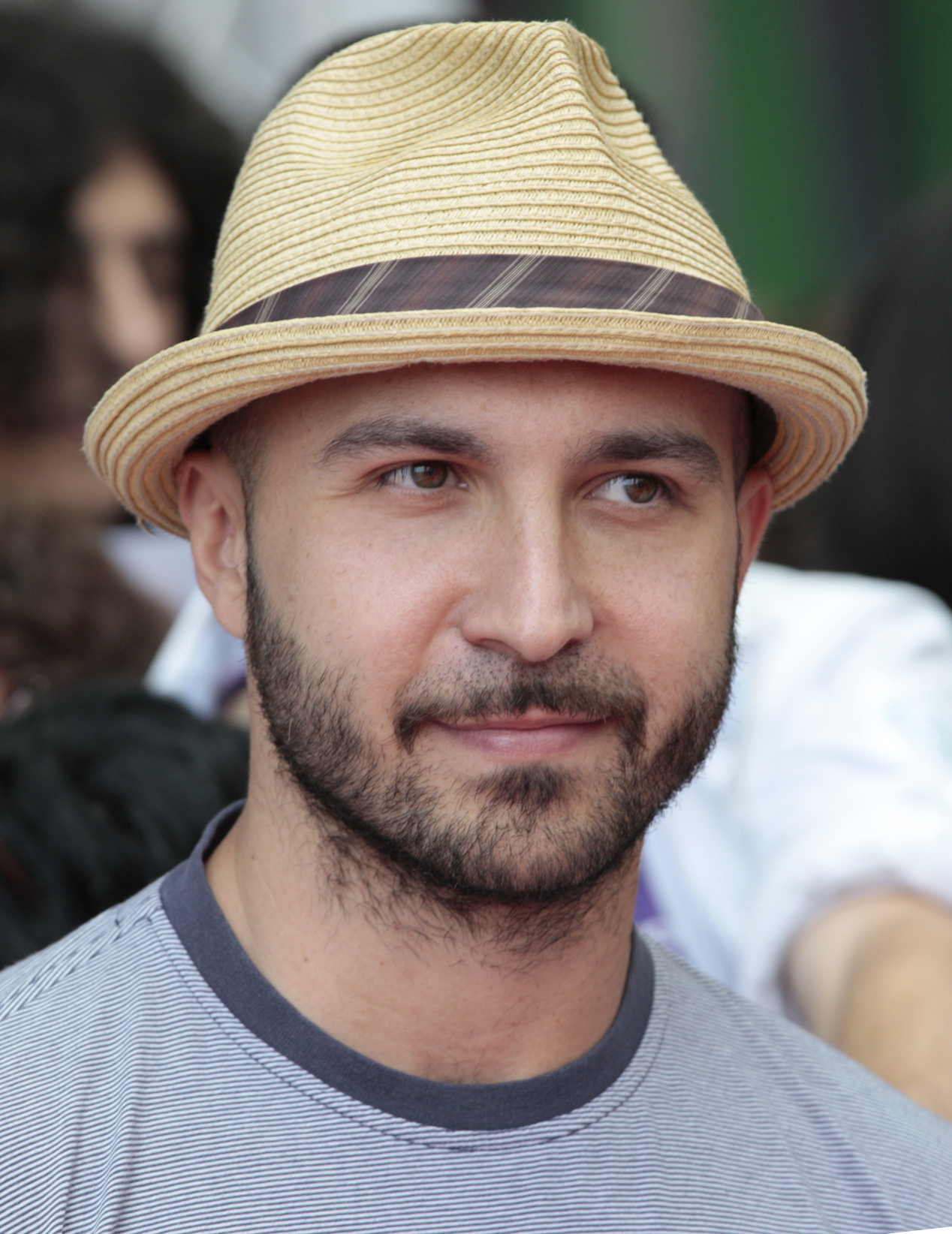
- Capatonda in 2010
- Born: Marcello Macchia; 2 August 1978 (age 48); Vasto, Abruzzo, Italy
- Occupations: Comedian; actor; writer; filmmaker
- Years active: 2003–present
- Height: 1.75 m (5 ft 9 in)

Marcello Macchia (born 2 August 1978) is an Italian comedian, actor, writer and filmmaker. Best known by his stage name Maccio Capatonda, he is also known for his participation in television programs such as Mai dire... on Italia 1.

With Enrico Venti, Capatonda leads Shortcut Productions, the company that produces their own videos. Since 2011, he is a member of the crew of Lo Zoo di 105. In 2015, he starred in his first film, Italiano medio. In 2020, Capatonda's first book, Libro (literal translate: Book), was released.

== Style ==
Capatonda's comedy is based primarily on parodying common mistakes of Italian speakers, and also in using long words out of their intended context; he makes his characters speak as clumsy illiterates that accidentally create new words along the way, trying to express themselves. Another part of his production ridicules commercials, reality shows, TV snake oil sellers and fortune tellers, soap operas, and film trailers. Sketches are peppered with onomatopoeia and strong emphasis in pronunciation. Another regular feature are the extremely unlikely names of the portrayed characters, frequently based on puns.

== Filmography ==
- Italiano medio (2015)
- Quel bravo ragazzo (2016)
- Omicidio all'italiana (2017)
- Robbing Mussolini (2022)
- Il migliore dei mondi (2023)
- Agata Christian: Delitto sulle nevi (2026)
- Smart Working (2026)

=== TV and web series ===
- Intralci (2006)
- La villa Di Lato (2009)
- Drammi medicali (2009)
- Lost in Google (2012)
- Mario (2013–2014)
- Bob Torrent (2015)
- The Generi (2018)
- Maccioverse (2022)
- Sono Lillo (2023–2024)
- No Activity: Italy (2024)
- Vita da Carlo (2024–2025)
- Sconfort Zone (2025)

=== Music videos ===
- 2007 – Amari – "Le gite fuori porta"
- 2008 – Elio e le Storie Tese – "Parco Sempione"
- 2008 – Elio e le Storie Tese – "Ignudi fra i nudisti"
- 2008 – Francesco Baccini – "Il topo mangia il gatto"
- 2015 – Rocco Hunt – "SignorHunt"
- 2017 – Fabio Rovazzi feat. Gianni Morandi – "Volare"
- 2019 – Fabio Rovazzi feat. Loredana Bertè and J-Ax – "Senza pensieri"
- 2019 – Danti feat. Nina Zilli and J-Ax – "Tu e D'io"
- 2020 – Danti feat. Luca Carboni and Shade – "Canzone sbagliata"

=== Reality shows ===
- LOL - Chi ride è fuori (2021)
- Prova prova sa sa (2022)

== Podcasts ==
- Podcast Micidiali (Audible, 2021)

== Bibliography ==
- Libro. Milan: Mondadori Electa. 2021. ISBN 978-88-9182-893-4.
- Libro 2. Racconti da mare. Milan: Mondadori Electa. 2022. ISBN 978-88-9183-410-2.

== Dubbing roles ==
- Red in The Angry Birds Movie
- Red in The Angry Birds Movie 2
- Phil Phillips in The Happytime Murders
- Ace in DC League of Super-Pets

== Personal life ==
In 2013, Capatonda was involved in a romantic relationship with Italian actress Elisabetta Canalis.
