= L'isola dei famosi season 9 =

L'isola dei famosi
- Season 9
- Presented by: Nicola Savino (in the studio); Vladimir Luxuria (from the island)
- No. of days: 72
- No. of castaways: 20
- Winner: Antonella Elia
- Runner-up: Manuel Casella
- Location: Cayos Cochinos, Honduras
- No. of episodes: 11

Release
- Original network: Rai 2
- Original release: January 25 – April 5, 2012

Season chronology
- ← Previous; Season 8 Next → Season 10

L'isola dei famosi 9 is the ninth season of the reality television L'isola dei famosi and the Italian version of the reality show franchise Survivor, aired in prime time on Rai 2 from 25 January to 5 April 2012, conducted by Nicola Savino, supported in the studio by commentators Diego Passoni, Lucilla Agosti, Laura Barriales (present only for the first two episodes), Nina Morić (present only for the first three episodes) and Barbara De Rossi (present from the third episode onwards), and with the participation of the correspondent Vladimir Luxuria. It lasted 72 days, had 20 castaways and 11 episodes and was held at Cayos Cochinos (Honduras).

The stories of the castaways were broadcast by Rai 2 in prime time with variations on Wednesday evenings (only the first episode), Thursday evenings (episodes 2-3, 5-11 and the special episode entitled Galà - La seratona) and Mondays (only the fourth episode), while the transmission of the daily strips in the day-time was entrusted to Rai 2 (from Monday to Friday).

It was the last edition broadcast by RAI, in fact the new executives, not deeming it suitable for the state TV schedule, did not renew the rights, which were then purchased by Mediaset in 2015.

The edition ended with the victory of Antonella Elia, who was awarded the prize money of €200,000.

== Contestants ==
The age of the contestants refers to the time of landing on the island.

Contestant	Age	Category	Profession	Birthplace	Day entered	Day exited	Finish
Antonella Elia	48	Heroes	Actress, showgirl, TV personality	Turin	36	72	Winner
Manuel Casella	33	Heroes	Model, actor, TV personality	Piacenza	29	72	Runner-up
Andrea Lehotská	30	Elected	Model, showgirl	Detva, Slovakia	29	72	3rd Place
Max Bertolani	47	Elected	Football player, actor	Aviano	1	72	4th Place
Aída Yéspica	29	Heroes	Showgirl, model, actress	Caracas, Venezuela	1	72	5th Place
Nina Morić	35	Heroes	Model, showgirl, TV personality	Zagreb, Croatia	22	65	11th Eliminated
Jivago Santinni	25	Elected	Model, TV personality	Santa Maria, Rio Grande do Sul	29	58	10th Eliminated
Guendalina Tavassi	26	Elected	Showgirl, TV personality	Rome	1	58	9th Eliminated
Carmen Russo	52	Heroes	Dancer, showgirl	Genoa	1	51	8th Eliminated
Divino Otelma	62	Elected	TV personality, psychic	Genoa	1	51	7th Eliminated
Rossano Rubicondi	39	Heroes	Actor, former model, TV personality	Rome	1	51	6th Eliminated
Valeria Marini	44	Heroes	Actress, showgirl, TV personality	Rome	1	44	5th Eliminated
Enzo Paolo Turchi	62	Heroes	Dancer, choreographer	Naples	1	41	Walked
Alessandro Cecchi Paone	50	Heroes	Journalist, TV presenter, TV personality	Rome	1	37	4th Eliminated
Mariano Apicella	49	Elected	Singer	Naples	1	30	3rd Eliminated
Cristiano Malgioglio	66	Heroes	Singer, TV personality	Ramacca	1	26	Walked
Den Harrow	49	Heroes	Singer	Nova Milanese	1	20	2nd Eliminated
Eliana Cartella	21	Elected	Model	Viareggio	1	17	Walked
Arianna David	38	Heroes	Model, TV presenter, TV personality	Rome	1	16	1st Eliminated
Flavia Vento	34	Heroes	Showgirl, actress, TV personality	Rome	1	10	Walked

== Nominations table ==
Legend

Leader: he/she is exempt from nominations and immediately nominates a contestant
The contestant is immune

	Week 1	Week 2	Week 3	Week 4	Week 5	Week 6	Week 7		Week 8	Week 9	Week 10	Week 11 Final			Nominations received
Leader	Carmen	Enzo Paolo	Carmen	Enzo Paolo	Valeria	Manuel	–	Manuel			–	Andrea	Manuel	–	Nominations received
Antonella	Not on Island					Valeria (3x)	Exempt	Aida	Andrea	Max	Manuel; Max	Nominated	Nominated	Winner (Day 72)	8
Manuel	Not on Island				Carmen	Andrea; Enzo Paolo	Exempt	Jivago; Max	Guendalina	Nina; Antonella	Aida; Antonella	Exempt	Exempt	Runner-up (Day 72)	1
Andrea	Not on Island				Max	Nina	Exempt	Otelma	Guendalina	Antonella	Antonella; Max	Antonella; Max	Nominated	3rd Place (Day 72)	8
Max	Rossano	Valeria	Exempt	Mariano; Valeria	Nina	Aida	Exempt	Antonella	Guendalina	Antonella	Aida; Antonella	Nominated	4th Place (Day 72)		16
Aida	Alessandro	Alessandro	Cristiano; Max	Mariano; Max	Nina	Max	Exempt	Antonella	Cayo; Solitario		Andrea; Antonella	5th Place (Day 72)			10
Nina	Not on Island			Exempt	Enzo Paolo	Andrea	Exempt	Otelma	Andrea	Max	Eliminated (Day 65)				6
Jivago	Not on Island				Max	Otelma	Exempt	Andrea	Andrea	Eliminated (Day 58)					1
Guendalina	Arianna	Den	Den	Carmen	Max	Otelma	Exempt	Otelma	Andrea	Eliminated (Day 58)					7
Carmen	Arianna	Alessandro	Den; Cristiano; Guendalina	Guendalina; Max	Nina	Cayo; Solitario			Eliminated (Day 51)						2
Otelma	Rossano	Valeria	Den	Aida	Aida	Guendalina	Exempt	Guendalina	Eliminated (Day 51)						7
Rossano	Flavia	Walked (Day 10)					Nominated	Eliminated (Day 51)							6
Valeria	Rossano	Alessandro	Cristiano; Max	Mariano; Max	Aida	Max	Eliminated (Day 44)								8
Enzo Paolo	Arianna	Valeria	Cristiano; Otelma	Aida; Otelma	Nina	Aida	Walked (Day 41)								3
Alessandro	Den	Valeria	Cayo; Solitario			Eliminated (Day 37)									7
Mariano	Rossano	Den	Den	Aida	Eliminated (Day 30)										5
Cristiano	Arianna	Alessandro	Enzo Paolo; Mariano	Mariano	Walked (Day 26)										4
Den	Arianna	Alessandro	Cristiano; Max	Eliminated (Day 20)											9
Eliana	Rossano	Den	Den	Walked (Day 17)											0
Arianna	Rossano	Cayo; Solitario	Eliminated (Day 16)												5
Flavia	Alessandro	Walked (Day 10)													1
Nominated by Heroes	Alessandro; Arianna; Rossano	Alessandro	–			Valeria	–	Antonella	–						
Nominated by Elected	–	Den	–			Otelma	–	Otelma	–						
Nominated by Tribe	–		Cristiano; Max	Mariano; Max	Nina	–			Andrea	Antonella	Aida; Antonella	–			
Nominated by Leader	–	Valeria	Den	Aida	Aida	Andrea	–	Jivago	Guendalina	Nina	–	Antonella; Max	–		
Nominated due to a challenge / twist	–				Carmen	–	Rossano	–					Andrea; Antonella	Antonella; Manuel	
Eliminated	Arianna; 56.33% to eliminate	Alessandro; 47.92% to eliminate	Den; 47.31% to eliminate	Mariano; 71.42% to eliminate	Carmen; 53.30% to eliminate	Valeria; 62.76% to eliminate	Rossano; Not chosen by constestans	Otelma; 56.64% to eliminate	Guendalina; 67.53% to eliminate	Antonella; 72.98% to eliminate	Aida; 58.46% to eliminate	Max; 68.25% to eliminate	Andrea; 78.04% to eliminate	Manuel; 26.55% to win	
Eliminated	Arianna; 56.33% to eliminate	Alessandro; 47.92% to eliminate	Den; 47.31% to eliminate	Mariano; 71.42% to eliminate	Carmen; 53.30% to eliminate	Valeria; 62.76% to eliminate	Rossano; Not chosen by constestans	Aida; Lost challenge	Jivago; Lost challenge	Nina; Lost challenge	Aida; 58.46% to eliminate	Max; 68.25% to eliminate	Andrea; 78.04% to eliminate	Antonella; 73.45% to win	
Cayo Solitario Nominated	–	Alessandro; Arianna	–	Alessandro; Mariano	Alessandro; Carmen	Carmen; Valeria	–	Aida; Carmen	Aida; Guendalina	Aida; Antonella; Nina	–				
Cayo Solitario Nominated	–	Alessandro; Arianna	–	Alessandro; Mariano	Alessandro; Carmen	Carmen; Valeria	–	Aida; Carmen	Aida; Jivago	Aida; Antonella; Nina	–				
Cayo Solitario Eliminated	–	Arianna; 14.13% to save	–	Mariano; 81.79% to eliminate	Alessandro; 59.14% to eliminate	Valeria; 81.21% to eliminate	–	Carmen; 62.89% to eliminate	Guendalina; 73.26% to eliminate	Nina; 19.84% to save	–				
Cayo Solitario Eliminated	–	Arianna; 14.13% to save	–	Mariano; 81.79% to eliminate	Alessandro; 59.14% to eliminate	Valeria; 81.21% to eliminate	–	Carmen; 62.89% to eliminate	Jivago; 65.56% to eliminate	Nina; 19.84% to save	–				

== TV Ratings ==
Episode	Date	Viewers	Share
1	January 25, 2012	3,311,000	13.43%
2	February 2, 2012	3,242,000	12.67%
3	February 9, 2012	4,223,000	17.47%
4	February 13, 2012	3,215,000	13.07%
5	February 23, 2012	3,159,000	12.42%
6	March 1, 2012	3,314,000	14.37%
7	March 8, 2012	3,516,000	15.72%
8	March 15, 2012	3,651,000	16.32%
9	March 22, 2012	3,584,000	16.13%
Semifinal	March 29, 2012	3,741,000	16.17%
Final	April 5, 2012	4,366,000	21.98%
Average		3,574,000	15.52%
Galà - La seratona	April 12, 2012	2,847,000	11.33%
