= L'isola dei famosi season 3 =

L'isola dei famosi
- Season 3
- Presented by: Simona Ventura (in the studio); Massimo Caputi (from the island)
- No. of days: 57
- No. of castaways: 15
- Winner: Lory Del Santo
- Runner-up: Maurizio Ferrini
- Location: Samaná, Dominican Republic
- No. of episodes: 9

Release
- Original network: Rai 2
- Original release: September 21 – November 16, 2005

Season chronology
- ← Previous; Season 2 Next → Season 4

L'isola dei famosi 3 is the third season of the reality television L'isola dei famosi and the Italian version of the reality show franchise Survivor, aired in prime time on Rai 2 from 21 September to 16 November 2005, hosted by Simona Ventura for the third consecutive time, supported in the studio by columnist Antonella Elia, and with the participation of correspondent Massimo Caputi. It lasted 57 days, had 15 castaways and 9 episodes and was held in Samaná (Dominican Republic).

The stories of the castaways were broadcast by Rai 2 every Wednesday in prime time, while the broadcast of the daily strips in the day-time was entrusted to Rai 2.

The season ended with the victory of Lory Del Santo, who was awarded the prize money of €200,000.

== Contestants ==
The age of the contestants refers to the time of landing on the island.

Contestant	Age	Profession	Birthplace	Day entered	Day exited	Status
Lory Del Santo	46	Actress, showgirl, TV personality, director	Povegliano Veronese	1	57	Winner
Maurizio Ferrini	52	Actor, TV personality	Cesena	36	57	Runner-up
Maria Giovanna Elmi	65	TV presenter, former TV announcer, singer	Rome	1	57	3rd Place
Elena Santarelli	24	Actress, showgirl, TV presenter, TV personality	Latina, Lazio	1	50	4th Place
Arianna David	31	Miss Italy, model, TV presenter, actress	Rome	1	50	8th Eliminated
Antonio Zequila	41	Actor, TV personality	Atrani	36	50	7th Eliminated
Edrissa "Idris" Sanneh	54	Journalist, TV personality	Brufut, The Gambia	22	43	6th Eliminated
Daniele Interrante	24	Model, TV personality	Milan	1	36	5th Eliminated
Manuel Casella	26	Actor, model	Cellino San Marco	1	29	4th Eliminated
Albano Antonio Carrisi (Al Bano)	62	Singer-songwriter, TV personality	Piacenza	1	29	Walked
Sandy Marton	45	Singer	Zagreb, Croatia	1	26	Walked
Fulco Ruffo di Calabria	51	Calabria's Prince, journalist, writer	Buenos Aires, Argentina	1	22	3rd Eliminated
Enzo Paolo Turchi	56	Dancer, choreographer	Naples	1	18	Walked
Romina Jolanda Carrisi-Power	18	TV personality	Cellino San Marco	1	15	2nd Eliminated
Cristina Quaranta	33	TV presenter, showgirl	Rome	1	8	1st Eliminated

== Nominations table ==
	Week 1	Week 2	Week 3	Week 4	Week 5	Week 6	Week 7			Week 8 Final		Nominations received
Leader	Team Phase			Daniele	Arianna	Elena		–				Nominations received
Lory	Fulco; Sandy	Romina	Exempt	Sandy	Daniele	Idris	Maurizio	Nominated	Nominated	Nominated	Winner (Day 57)	2
Maurizio	Not on Island					Exempt	Arianna	Nominated	Nominated	Nominated	Runner-up (Day 57)	3
Maria	Manuel; Sandy	Romina	Exempt	Manuel	Daniele	Idris	Maurizio	Nominated	Nominated	Nominated	3rd Place (Day 57)	5
Elena	Cristina; Fulco	Maria	Fulco	Manuel	Idris	Maria	Antonio	Nominated	Nominated	4rd Place (Day 50)		0
Arianna	Cristina; Fulco	Maria	Exempt	Manuel	Idris	Idris	Maurizio	Nominated	Eliminated (Day 50)			5
Antonio	Not on Island					Exempt	Arianna	Eliminated (Day 50)				1
Idris	Not on Island			Exempt	Daniele	Arianna	Eliminated (Day 43)					6
Daniele	Cristina; Fulco	Exempt	Fulco	Al Bano	Idris	Eliminated (Day 36)						4
Manuel	Al Bano; Arianna	Exempt	Sandy	Arianna	Eliminated (Day 29)							4
Al Bano	Cristina; Fulco	Exempt	Sandy	Sandy	Walked (Day 29)							3
Sandy	Cristina; Lory	Exempt	Fulco	Albano	Walked (Day 26)							6
Fulco	Lory; Maria	Exempt	Sandy	Eliminated (Day 22)								10
Enzo Paolo	Cristina; Fulco	Romina	Walked (Day 18)									0
Romina	Fulco; Maria	Maria	Eliminated (Day 15)									3
Cristina	Daniele; Sandy	Eliminated (Day 15)										6
Nominated by Tribe	Cristina; Fulco	Maria; Romina	Fulco; Sandy	Manuel	Daniele	Idris	Maurizio	–				
Nominated by Leader	–			Albano	Idris	Maria	Antonio	–				
Automatically Nominated	–							Arianna; Elena; Lory; Maria; Maurizio	Elena; Lory; Maria; Maurizio	Lory; Maria; Maurizio	Lory; Maurizio	
Eliminated	Cristina; 78% to eliminate	Romina; 59% to eliminate	Fulco; 68% to eliminate	Manuel; 51% to eliminate	Daniele; 69% to eliminate	Idris; 52% to eliminate	Antonio; 77% to eliminate	Arianna; 58% to eliminate	Elena; 79% to eliminate	Maria; 54% to eliminate	Maurizio; 25% to win	
Eliminated	Cristina; 78% to eliminate	Romina; 59% to eliminate	Fulco; 68% to eliminate	Manuel; 51% to eliminate	Daniele; 69% to eliminate	Idris; 52% to eliminate	Antonio; 77% to eliminate	Arianna; 58% to eliminate	Elena; 79% to eliminate	Maria; 54% to eliminate	Lory; 75% to win	

- Note 1: During the first two weeks of the game, the castaways were divided into two teams, the Beach team (women), and the Cavern team (men).
- Note 2: In Week 2, Enzo Paolo switched from the Cave team to the Beach team.
- Note 3: In Week 2, Elena switched from the Beach team to the Cave team.
- Note 4: On Day 8, Enzo Paolo walked from the game due to health problems. He was replaced by Idris.
- Note 5: In Week 5, Albano and Sandy walked, the former for family problems, the latter for health reasons. Antonio and Maurizio replaced them.

== TV Ratings ==
Episode	Date	Viewers	Share
1	September 21, 2005	5,667,000	28.31%
2	September 28, 2005	5,972,000	28.20%
3	October 5, 2005	6,792,000	31.21%
4	October 12, 2005	8,649,000	40.48%
5	October 19, 2005	7,851,000	34.83%
6	October 26, 2005	8,250,000	36.65%
7	November 2, 2005	7,622,000	34.75%
Semifinal	November 9, 2005	8,465,000	38.74%
Final	November 16, 2005	9,513,000	42.53%
Average		7,643,000	35.25%
Galà - Tutti a casa	November 23, 2005	4,542,000	21.30%
