= Nicola Savino =

Italian television presenter, author, and actor

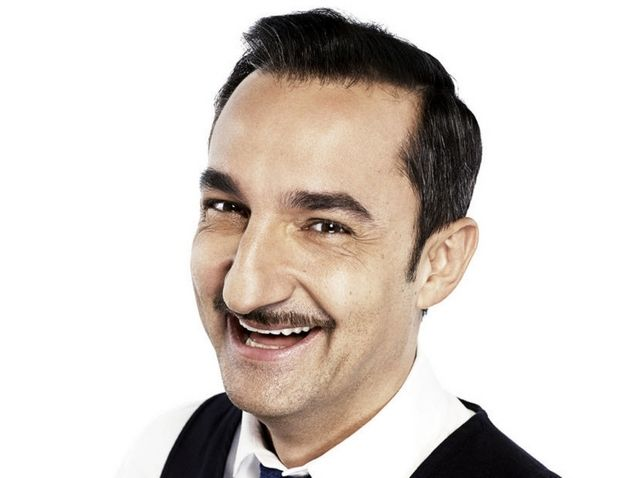
- Born: 14 November 1967 (age 58); Lucca, Italy
- Occupations: Radio host, television presenter, television author, radio director, actor, record producer and impersonator
- Years active: 1984–present

Nicola Savino (born 14 November 1967) is an Italian radio host, television presenter, television writer, radio director, actor, record producer and impersonator.

== Biography ==
Nicola Savino was born in Lucca on 14 November 1967 to an engineer father from Foggia and a pharmacist mother from Cosenza and grew up in Metanopoli (a hamlet of San Donato Milanese), the city where his father Francesco worked for Eni. At seven months old he lost the little finger of one hand, amputated by mistake by a hospital nurse.

He has been married to Manuela Suma since 2009, he is the father of Matilda, born on 2 August 2005.

He has expressed interest in both Inter and Cosenza football clubs.

=== Radio ===
He began working in 1984 in the local station Radio Sandonato. In the following 5 years, in which he divides himself between radio and discos, he contacts various radio networks proposing himself as a director (I aimed lower as a job to have a fixed salary and make my mother happy he said) and in 1989 he gets a positive response from part of Claudio Cecchetto, who inserts it in Radio DeeJay. Here he takes care of the direction of W Radio Deejay from the beginning, a program conducted by Marco Baldini and Fiorello, and later that of the Baldini Ama Laurenti program, with Marco Baldini, Amadeus and Luca Laurenti.

In 1995 he temporarily landed on Radio Capital with the program Two minus ten, conducted by Amadeus and Dj Angelo. In 1996 he returned to Radio DeeJay, and a few months later he was on the air in Linus Deejay chiama Italia, during which the conductor frequently asks Nicola to get his opinion as a man in the street on the events of the day: the exchanges resulting from it are so successful that Nicola interventions on the microphone, at first extemporaneous, become a constant of the radio appointment and earn him notoriety with the pseudonym Uomo Della Strada and its acronym UDS.

The two-voice formula of the program meets the favor of the historic conductor and the public, and from 1999 Nicola Savino became co-host of Deejay call Italy. In the meantime Nicola also participates in the Ciao belli program to which, since the first season in 1998, he contributes as an author and imitator of famous characters (including Ligabue, the Inter captain Zanetti, Gian Piero Galeazzi, Silvio Berlusconi, Enrico Ruggeri and many others) together with Digei Angelo and Roberto Ferrari.

In the summer of 2006 he hosted the radio program Rio on his own, on music and the protagonists of the eighties.

=== Television ===
Nicola Savino was the author of the Festivalbar from 1996 to 2004. From 1998 to 2002 he was the author of Le Iene, as well as the voice-over who introduces the conductors at the beginning of the programme. He was also the author of Zelig Circus (2003) and Zelig Off (2004) as well as Telegatti. From 2003 to 2009 he collaborated with those who football, during the management of Simona Ventura, holding the role of correspondent. In 2004 he presented Sformat on Rai 2 with Digei Angelo, Camila Raznovich and Aída Yéspica. He was also one of the symbolic faces of Sky Cinema where he presented Sky Cine News and the sitcom An Armchair for Two with Alessia Ventura from 2004 to 2008.

On Rai 2 in the summer of 2007 he joined Flavia Cercato in Soirée. From 2007 to 2009 you presented Scorie, a variety based on a mix of curious television images, off-air, studio gags, illustrious guests and comedians. In 2009 you left Rai to move to Mediaset. You led the Colorado Cafè in the 2009 and 2010 editions with Rossella Brescia and Dj Angelo. In 2010 you presented together with Juliana Moreira, Matricole & Meteore on Italia 1, with the participation of Dj Angelo. Back in RAI, on 29 March 2011 he hosted L'isola dei famosi replacing the presenter Simona Ventura, who landed in Honduras.

From 25 January to 5 April 2012, Savino hosted the ninth edition of L'isola dei famosi on Rai 2, supported by Vladimir Luxuria as correspondent and co-host. From 22 November of the same year, Savino hosted the new edition of Un minuto per vincere on Rai 2. From the 2013/2014 season, again on Rai 2, after four years, he returned to Quelli che... il Calcio, this time as host and succeeding Victoria Cabello, first solo, to then be joined from 2015 to 2017 by Gialappa's Band. On 10 May 2014 he commented live with Linus on the final of the Eurovision Song Contest 2014 on Rai 2.

In 2016 he conducted the DopoFestival 2016 on Rai 1 together with Max Giusti and Gialappa's Band, an experience repeated the following year always with Gialappa's Band and Ubaldo Pantani. From 28 December 2016 he leads Boss incognito on Rai 2.

On 17 May 2017 his return to Mediaset was made official; from 2017 to 2021 he was one of the conductors of Le Iene. In 2018 he hosts Italia 1 90 Special, flanked by Katia Follesa, Ivana Mrázová and Cristiano Malgioglio, in the summer he is at the helm of Balalaika – Dalla Russia col pallone with the ball with Ilary Blasi and Belén Rodríguez on Canale 5. In 2020 he is chosen by Amadeus to host on RaiPlay L'altro Festival.

From 8 December 2021 he will host the new musical format Il giovane Old on RaiPlay for five Wednesdays. In 2022 he presents the new Back to School program on Italia 1. Later he took part, this time as a columnist, together with Vladimir Luxuria, in the sixteenth edition of L'isola dei famosi, conducted by Ilary Blasi.

On 30 June 2022 he formalized his move to Sky, thus leaving Mediaset after five years; arrives in the prime-time access range of TV8 with the game show 100% Italia.

=== Cinema ===
Nicola Savino worked as an actor for the film Agente matrimoniale, produced by Eleonora Giorgi, with Corrado Fortuna, directed by Christian Bisceglia and music by Mario Venuti, released on 6 July 2007. He played the role of a waiter in the film by Massimo Venier with Ale e Franz, Mi fido di te.

As a voice actor, in 2011 he voiced Happy Feet Two, in 2016 the sloth Flash in the film Zootopia and finally in 2018 the rabbit Peter Rabbit in the first film Peter Rabbit and in the sequel Peter Rabbit 2: The Runaway on the run course of 2020.

== Television programs ==
Year	Title	Network	Role
2003–2006, 2008–2009	Quelli che... il Calcio	Rai 2	Sent
2013–2017	Quelli che... il Calcio	Rai 2	Conductor
2004–2007	Sky Cine News	Sky Cinema	Conductor
2004	Sformat	Rai 2	Conductor
2006–2009	Deejay chiama Italia	All Music	Conductor
2009–2015, from 2018	Deejay chiama Italia	DeeJay TV	Conductor
2015–2017	Deejay chiama Italia	Nove	Conductor
2017	Deejay chiama Italia	DMAX	Conductor
2006	L'isola dei famosi	Rai 2	Opinionist
2011–2012	L'isola dei famosi	Rai 2	Conductor
2022	L'isola dei famosi	Canale 5	Opinionist
2007	Soirée	Rai 2	Conductor
2007–2009	Scorie	Rai 2	Conductor
2009–2011	Colorado	Italia 1	Conductor
2010	Matricole & Meteore	Italia 1	Conductor
2011	Star Academy	Rai 2	Sworn
2012–2013	Un minuto per vincere	Rai 2	Conductor
2014	Eurovision Song Contest	Rai 2	Commentator
2014	Quanto manca	Rai 2	Conductor
2015	Techetechete'	Rai 1	Episode 67
2016–2017	DopoFestival	Rai 1	Conductor
2016	TIMmusic Onstage Awards	Rai 2	Conductor
2016	Sketch Point	Rai 2	Conductor
2016–2017	Boss in incognito	Rai 2	Conductor
2017–2021	Le Iene	Italia 1	Conductor
2018	90 Special	Italia 1	Conductor
2022	Balalaika – Dalla Russia col pallone	Canale 5	Conductor
2022	Back to School	Italia 1	Conductor
2022–present	100% Italia	TV8	Conductor

=== As an author ===
Year	Title	Network	Role
1996–2004	Festivalbar	Italia 1	Author
1998–2002	Le Iene	Italia 1	Author
2003	Zelig Circus	Italia 1	Author
2003	Zelig Circus	Canale 5	Author
2004	Zelig Off	Italia 1	Author

== Web ==
Year	Title	Platform	Role
2020	L'altro Festival	RaiPlay	Conductor
2021–2022	Il giovane Old	RaiPlay	Conductor

== Filmography ==
=== Film ===
Year	Title	Director
2004	Natale a casa Deejay	Lorenzo Bassano
2004	Do You Know Claudia?	Massimo Venier
2006	Agente matrimoniale	Christian Bisceglia
2007	I Trust You	Massimo Venier

=== Television ===
Year	Title	Network
2006–2008	Una poltrona per due	Sky Cinema

=== Actor de voice ===
Title	Role
Buon compleanno Paperino – 70 fantastici anni	narrative voice
Happy Feet Two	Will il Krill
Zootopia	Flash
Peter Rabbit 2: The Runaway	Peter Rabbit

== Discography ==
=== Album ===
Year	Title	Artist
1993	Pinocchio Vai!! (con i Pin-Occhio)	Nicola Savino

=== Singles ===
Year	Title	Artist
1993	Pinocchio	Nicola Savino
1993	Tutatutatutata	Nicola Savino
1993	Vai!!	Nicola Savino
1994	Enjoy the Music	Nicola Savino
1994	Happy Gipsies	Nicola Savino
1994	The Return	Nicola Savino
