= L'isola dei famosi season 12 =

L'isola dei famosi
- Season 12
- Presented by: Alessia Marcuzzi (in the studio); Stefano Bettarini (from the island)
- No. of days: 73
- No. of castaways: 14
- Winner: Raz Degan
- Runner-up: Simone Susinna
- Location: Cayos Cochinos, Honduras
- No. of episodes: 11

Release
- Original network: Canale 5
- Original release: January 31 – April 12, 2017

Season chronology
- ← Previous; Season 11 Next → Season 13

L'isola dei famosi 12 is the twelfth season of the reality television L'isola dei famosi and the Italian version of the reality show franchise Survivor, aired in prime time on Canale 5 from 31 January to 12 April 2017. It was the third edition broadcast by Mediaset, hosted by Alessia Marcuzzi for the third consecutive time, supported in the studio by columnist Vladimir Luxuria, and with the participation of the envoy Stefano Bettarini. It lasted 73 days, had 14 castaways and 11 episodes and was held in Cayos Cochinos (Honduras).

The stories of the castaways were broadcast by Canale 5 in prime time with variations on Monday evenings (episodes 2–4), Tuesdays (episodes 1, 5–10) and Wednesdays (eleventh and final episode), while the daily strips in the day-time was entrusted to Canale 5 (from Monday to Friday) and Italia 1 (everyday). Furthermore, the day-time was broadcast on La5 and Mediaset Extra with the addition of unpublished material with the title of L'isola dei famosi - Extended Edition, the duration of which varied from 175 to 180 minutes.

The edition ended with the victory of Raz Degan, who was awarded the prize money of €100,000.

== Contestants ==
The age of the contestants refers to the time of landing on the island.

Contestant	Age	Profession	Birthplace	Day entered	Day exited	Status
Raz Degan	48	Actor, director, former model	Sde Nehemia, Israel	1	73	Winner
Simone Susinna	23	Model	Catania	1	73	Runner-up
Eva Grimaldi	55	Actress	Nogarole Rocca	1	73	3rd Place
Nancy Coppola	30	Neomelodic singer, actress	Naples	1	73	4th Place
Filomena "Malena" Mastromarino	34	Pornographic actress, former political executive	Noci	1	73	5th Place
Giulio Base	52	Director	Turin	1	65	7th Eliminated
Moreno Donadoni	27	Rapper	Genoa	1	65	6th Eliminated
Samantha de Grenet	46	TV presenter, showgirl, former model	Rome	1	58	5th Eliminated
Giulia Calcaterra	25	Showgirl	Magenta, Lombardy	1	37	4th Eliminated
Massimo Ceccherini	51	Actor, director, comedian, screenwriter	Florence	1	23	Walked
Giacomo Urtis	39	Surgeon, TV personality	Caracas, Venezuela	1	22	3rd Eliminated
Nathaly Caldonazzo	47	Actress, showgirl	Rome	1	15	2nd Eliminated
Andrea Marcaccini	28	Model	Messina	1	8	Ejected
Dayane Mello	27	Model, TV personality	Joinville, Brazil	1	8	1st Eliminated

=== Televote to enter the game ===
Contestant	Age	Profession	Birthplace	Status
Giulia Calcaterra	26	Showgirl	Magenta, Lombardy	Winner
Desiree Popper	29	Model	Brazil	Didn't come into play
Elena Morali	26	Showgirl, TV personality	Ponte San Pietro	Didn't come into play

=== Guests in Honduras ===
Name	Age	Profession	Birthplace	Duration
Imma Battaglia	57	Politics, TV personality	Portici	Day 30 - 35
Rocco Siffredi	53	Pornographic actor, TV personality	Ortona	Day 37 - 42
Paola Barale	50	TV presenter, actress	Fossano	Day 44 - 45

== Nominations table ==
Legend

Leader: he/she is immune or completely exempt from nominations and can automatically send a contestant to the public vote

	Week 1	Week 2	Week 3	Week 4	Week 5	Week 6	Week 7	Week 8	Week 9		Week 8	Week 11 Final			Nominations received
Leader	none	Giacomo	Simone	Samantha	Raz	Malena	Samantha	Raz	Simone		Raz	none			Nominations received
Raz	Samantha	Eva	Massimo	Giulia	Giulia	Moreno	Giulio	Samantha	Nancy	No; Nominations	Nancy	Immune	Nominated	Winner (Day 73)	20
Simone	Nathaly	Nathaly	Eva	Raz	Nancy	Raz	Raz	Giulio	Giulio	No; Nominations	Malena	Nominated	Immune	Runner-up (Day 73)	13
Eva	Dayane	Simone	Giacomo	Raz	Simone	Raz	Simone	Samantha	Exempt	Nominated	Simone	Immune	Nominated	3rd Place (Day 73)	3
Nancy	Dayane	Nathaly	Raz	Raz	Simone	Raz	Raz	Giulio	Raz	No; Nominations	Simone	Nominated	4th Place (Day 73)		5
Malena	Dayane	Nathaly	Raz	Massimo	Simone	Simone	Raz	Giulio	Raz	No; Nominations	Simone	5th Place (Day 73)			6
Giulio	Dayane	Nathaly	Giacomo	Raz	Simone	Raz	Simone	Malena	Malena	Nominated	Malena	Eliminated (Day 65)			6
Moreno	Dayane	Nathaly	Raz	Massimo	Simone	Samantha	Exempt			Eliminated (Day 65)					2
Samantha	Dayane	Massimo	Giacomo	Massimo	Moreno	Raz	Eva	Malena	Raz	Eliminated (Day 58)					7
Giulia	Dayane	Nathaly	Raz	Raz	Simone	Eliminated (Day 37)									3
Massimo	Dayane	Malena	Samantha	Giulia	Walked (Day 23)										7
Giacomo	Samantha	Giulio	Massimo	Eliminated (Day 22)											3
Nathaly	Nancy	Massimo	Eliminated (Day 15)												7
Andrea	Nancy	Ejected (Day 8)													0
Dayane	Samantha	Eliminated (Day 8)													8
Nominated by Tribe	Dayane; Samantha	Massimo; Nathaly	Giacomo; Raz	Massimo; Raz	Moreno; Simone	Moreno; Raz	Raz; Simone	Giulio; Malena	Raz	none	Malena; Simone	none			
Nominated by Leader	none				Giulia	Simone	Eva	Samantha	Giulio	none					
Nominated due to a challenge	none											Nancy; Simone	Eva; Raz	none	
Eliminated	Dayane; 53%	Nathaly; 63%	Giacomo; 67%	Elimination cancelled	Giulia; 43%	Moreno; 53%	Eva; 55%	Samantha; 72%	Giulio; 91%	none	Malena; 66%	Nancy; 70%	Eva; 86%	Simone; 11% to win	
Eliminated	Dayane; 53%	Nathaly; 63%	Giacomo; 67%	Elimination cancelled	Giulia; 43%	Moreno; 53%	Eva; 55%	Samantha; 72%	Giulio; 91%	none	Malena; 66%	Nancy; 70%	Eva; 86%	Raz; 89% to win	
Potential Contestants	Giulia; 54% Desirèe; 46%	none													
Primitive Island Nominated	none								Giulio; Moreno	Eva; Giulio	none				
Primitive Island Eliminated	none								Moreno; 73%	Giulio; 48% to save	none				

== TV Ratings ==
Episode	Date	Viewers	Share
1	January 31, 2017	4,151,000	21.95%
2	February 5, 2017	3,780,000	18.88%
3	February 13, 2017	3,581,000	18.42%
4	February 20, 2017	3,721,000	19.62%
5	February 28, 2017	4,176,000	21.18%
6	March 7, 2017	4,008,000	20.72%
7	March 14, 2017	3,826,000	19.68%
8	March 21, 2017	4,139,000	21.01%
9	March 28, 2017	4,253,000	22.01%
Semifinal	April 4, 2017	4,116,000	22.51%
Final	April 12, 2017	4,253,000	24.58%
Average		4,000,000	20.96%
