= L'isola dei famosi season 2 =

L'isola dei famosi
- Season 2
- Presented by: Simona Ventura (in the studio); Massimo Caputi (from the island)
- No. of days: 57
- No. of castaways: 13
- Winner: Sergio Múñiz
- Runner-up: Kabir Bedi
- Location: Samaná, Dominican Republic
- No. of episodes: 9

Release
- Original network: Rai 2
- Original release: September 17 – November 19, 2004

Season chronology
- ← Previous; Season 1 Next → Season 3

L'isola dei famosi 2 is the second season of the reality television L'isola dei famosi and the Italian version of the reality show franchise Survivor, aired in prime time on Rai 2 from 17 September to 19 November 2004, conducted by Simona Ventura for the second consecutive time, flanked in the studio by commentators Alfonso Signorini, Luca Giurato, Antonio Mazzi, Aldo Biscardi, Sandro Mayer, Bruno Vespa and Giada De Blanck, and with the participation of the correspondent Massimo Caputi. It lasted 57 days, had 13 castaways and 9 episodes and was held in Samaná (Dominican Republic).

The stories of the castaways were broadcast by Rai 2 every Friday in prime time, while the broadcast of the daily strips in the day-time was entrusted to Rai 2.

The edition ended with the victory of Sergio Múñiz, who was awarded the prize money of €200,000.

== TV Ratings ==
Episode	Date	Viewers	Share
1	September 17, 2004	5,191,000	20.84%
1	September 24, 2004	5,200,000	25.43%
2	October 1, 2004	5,875,000	27.78%
3	October 8, 2004	6,668,000	30.84%
4	October 15, 2004	6,730,000	29.75%
5	October 22, 2004	7,417,000	33.01%
6	October 29, 2004	8,262,000	35.86%
7	November 5, 2004	9,041,000	37.96%
Semifinal	November 12, 2004	9,426,000	39.90%
Final	November 19, 2004	10,977,000	46.02%
Average		7,479,000	32.73%
Galà - Tutti a casa	November 26, 2004	5,085,000	23.15%
