= Surviving Africa =

- Genre: Reality show
- Presented by: Simona Ventura
- Country of origin: Italy
- Original language: Italian
- No. of series: 1

Production
- Running time: 180 min.

Original release
- Network: Italia 1

Surviving Africa is an Italian reality show broadcast on Italia 1 and presented by Simona Ventura.

== Seasons ==
=== Season 1 ===
The first season is expected to be launched in November 2017.
