= L'isola dei famosi season 11 =

L'isola dei famosi
- Season 11
- Presented by: Alessia Marcuzzi (in the studio); Alvin (from the island)
- No. of days: 62
- No. of castaways: 18
- Winner: Giacobbe Fragomeni
- Runner-up: Jonás Berami
- Location: Cayos Cochinos, Honduras
- No. of episodes: 10

Release
- Original network: Canale 5
- Original release: March 9 – May 9, 2016

Season chronology
- ← Previous; Season 10 Next → Season 12

L'isola dei famosi 11 is the eleventh season of the reality television L'isola dei famosi and the Italian version of the reality show franchise Survivor, aired in prime time on Canale 5 from 9 March to 9 May 2016. It was the second edition broadcast by Mediaset, hosted by Alessia Marcuzzi for the second consecutive year, flanked in the studio by columnists Mara Venier and Alfonso Signorini, and with the participation of the envoy Alvin. It lasted 62 days, had 18 castaways and 10 episodes and was held in Cayos Cochinos (Honduras). The motto of this edition was Me parece todo estupendo!.

The stories of the castaways were broadcast by Canale 5 every Monday in prime time (with the exception of the first episode, broadcast on Wednesdays), while the broadcast of the daily strips in the day-time was entrusted to Canale 5 (from Monday to Friday) and to Italia 1 (every day). Furthermore, on La5 on Wednesday evening (first on Thursday evening) the La5 Edition version was broadcast with the best of each week spent by the castaways, while on Mediaset Extra on Sunday evening (first on Friday evening) reruns of the prime time.

The edition ended with the victory of Giacobbe Fragomeni, who was awarded the prize money of €100,000.

== Contestants ==
The age of the contestants refers to the time of landing on the island.

Notably among the contestants is Simona Ventura who was the previous host of the series.

Contestant	Age	Profession	Birthplace	Day entered	Day exited	Status
Giacobbe Fragomeni	46	Professional boxer	Milan	1	62	Winner
Jonás Berami	32	Actor, TV personality	Málaga, Andalusia, Spain	1	62	Runner-up
Mercédesz Henger	24	Showgirl, TV personality	Győr, Hungary	1	62	3rd Place
Paola Caruso	31	Model, showgirl, TV personality	Catanzaro	1	62	4th Place
Gracia De Torres	28	Model	Almería, Andalusia, Spain	1	62	5th Place
Marco Carta	30	Singer	Cagliari	1	55	11th Eliminated
Cristian Gallella	32	TV personality	Vigevano	1	55	10th Eliminated
Alessia Reato	25	Model, showgirl	L'Aquila	1	55	9th Eliminated
Gianluca Mech	46	Entrepreneur	Montecchio Maggiore	15	48	8th Eliminated
Stefano Orfei	49	Circus artist	Genoa	1	41	7th Eliminated
Andrea Preti	27	Model, actor	Copenhagen, Denmark	1	41	6th Eliminated
Simona Ventura	50	TV presenter, showgirl	Bentivoglio, Emilia-Romagna	1	34	5th Eliminated
Aristide Malnati	51	Archaeologist, egyptologist, TV personality	Milan	1	27	Walked
Gloria Patricia Contreras	28	Actress	Morelia, Michoacán, Mexico	1	20	4th Eliminated
Marina Fiordaliso (Fiordaliso)	60	Singer	Piacenza	1	20	3rd Eliminated
Enzo Salvi	52	Actor	Rome	1	13	2nd Eliminated
Claudia Galanti	34	Showgirl, TV personality	Asunción, Paraguay	1	6	1st Eliminated
Matteo Cambi	38	Entrepreneur	Carpi, Emilia-Romagna	1	5	Walked

== Nominations table ==
Legend

Leader: he/she is immune or completely exempt from nominations and can automatically send a contestant to the public vote
The contestant is immune

	Week 1	Week 2	Week 3	Week 4		Week 5	Week 6	Week 7		Week 8	Week 9			Week 10 Final			Nominations received
Leader	Mercedesz	Simona	Stefano	–	Gracia		Alessia	Jonás		Cristian	–		Jonás	–			Nominations received
Giacobbe	Playa Desnuda			No; Nominations	Exempt	Alessia	Gianluca	Nominated	Gianluca	Marco	No; Nominations	Nominated	Gracia	Nominated	Nominated	Winner (Day 62)	5
Jonás	Aristide	Nominated	Fiordaliso	No; Nominations	Simona	Stefano	Andrea	No; Nominations	Gianluca	Paola	Nominated	No; Nominations	Paola	Immune	Immune	Runner-up (Day 62)	9
Mercédesz	Claudia	Alessia	Simona	No; Nominations	Simona	Stefano	Andrea	No; Nominations	Paola	Paola	No; Nominations	No; Nominations	Paola	Immune	Nominated	3rd place (Day 62)	2
Paola	Playa Desnuda			Nominated	Exempt	Andrea	Andrea	No; Nominations	Gracia	Gracia	Playa Soledad		Gracia	Nominated	4th place (Day 62)		12
Gracia	Playa Desnuda	Exempt	Fiordaliso	No; Nominations	Simona	Paola	Nominated	No; Nominations	Paola	Paola	No; Nominations	No; Nominations	Paola	5th place (Day 62)			6
Marco	Enzo	Enzo	Fiordaliso	No; Nominations	Jonás	Paola	Andrea	No; Nominations	Giacobbe	Giacobbe	No; Nominations	Nominated	Giacobbe	Eliminated (Day 55)			7
Cristian	Not on Island		Exempt	No; Nominations	Andrea	Andrea	Andrea	No; Nominations	Giacobbe	Marco	Nominated	Playa Soledad	Gracia	Eliminated (Day 55)			0
Alessia	Jonás	Enzo	Fiordaliso	No; Nominations	Jonás	Stefano	Paola	Nominated	Playa Soledad				Eliminated (Day 55)				6
Gianluca	Not on Island		Nominated	No; Nominations	Marco	Marco	Andrea	Nominated	Giacobbe	Eliminated (Day 48)							3
Stefano	Jonás	Mercédesz	Alessia	No; Nominations	Jonás	Alessia	Playa Soledad		Eliminated (Day 41)								3
Andrea	Playa Desnuda		Exempt	No; Nominations	Jonás	Marco	Paola	Eliminated (Day 41)									9
Simona	Jonás	Mercédesz	Fiordaliso	No; Nominations	Jonás	Playa Soledad	Eliminated (Day 34)										5
Aristide	Marco	Fiordaliso	Fiordaliso	Playa Soledad		Walked (Day 27)											2
Patricia	Playa Desnuda			Nominated	Eliminated (Day 20)												0
Fiordaliso	Alessia	Aristide	Simona	Eliminated (Day 20)													7
Enzo	Marco	Alessia	Eliminated (Day 13)														3
Claudia	Jonás	Eliminated (Day 6)															1
Matteo	Playa Desnuda	Walked (Day 6)															0
Nominated by Tribe	Jonás	Enzo	Fiordaliso	–	Jonás	Stefano	Andrea	–	Giacobbe	Paola	–		Gracia	–			
Nominated by Leader	Claudia	Mercédesz	Alessia	–	Simona	Paola		–	Gianluca	Marco	–		Paola	–			
Nominated due to a challenge / twist	–	Jonás	Gianluca	Paola; Patricia	–		Gracia	Alessia; Giacobbe; Gianluca	–		Cristian; Jonás	Giacobbe; Marco	–	Giacobbe; Paola	Giacobbe; Mercédesz	–	
Eliminated	Claudia; 77%	Enzo; 66%	Fiordaliso; 46%	Patricia; 6% to save	Simona; 67%	Stefano; 71%	Andrea; 42%	Alessia; 58%	Gianluca; 60%	Paola; 60%	Cristian; 55%	Marco; 54%	Gracia; 54%	Paola; 61%	Mercédesz; 65%	Jonás; 35% to win	
Eliminated	Claudia; 77%	Enzo; 66%	Fiordaliso; 46%	Patricia; 6% to save	Simona; 67%	Stefano; 71%	Andrea; 42%	Alessia; 58%	Gianluca; 60%	Paola; 60%	Cristian; 55%	Marco; 54%	Gracia; 54%	Paola; 61%	Mercédesz; 65%	Giacobbe; 65% to win	
Playa Soledad Nominated	–			Aristide; Patricia	–	Simona; Stefano	–	Alessia; Stefano	–			Alessia; Cristian; Marco; Paola	–				
Playa Soledad Eliminated	–			Patricia; 20% to save	–	Simona; 49% to save	–	Stefano; 36% to save	–			Alessia; 7% to save Cristian; 17% to save Marco; 36% to save	–				

== TV Ratings ==
Episode	Date	Viewers	Share
1	March 9, 2016	4,430,000	23.44%
2	March 14, 2016	4,138,000	21.19%
3	March 21, 2016	4,066,000	21.10%
4	March 28, 2016	4,226,000	21.87%
5	April 4, 2016	4,577,000	23.50%
6	April 11, 2016	4,080,000	21.68%
7	April 18, 2016	4,170,000	22.70%
8	April 25, 2016	4,083,000	21.87%
Semifinal	May 2, 2016	4,155,000	21.86%
Final	May 9, 2016	4,760,000	24.71%
Average		4,270,000	22.39%
