= L'isola dei famosi =

Reality television show aired in Italy

- Created by: Charlie Parsons
- Directed by: Egidio Romio (2003–2012); Roberto Cenci (2015–2018, 2021–present); Paolo Riccadonna (2019)
- Presented by: Simona Ventura (2003–2008, 2010–2011); Nicola Savino (2011–2012); Alessia Marcuzzi (2015–2019); Ilary Blasi (2021–2023); Vladimir Luxuria (2024); Veronica Gentili (2025)
- Country of origin: Italy
- No. of seasons: 19

Production
- Production company: Banijay Italia

Original release
- Network: Rai 2 (2003–2008, 2010–2012); Canale 5 (2015–2019, 2021–present)
- Release: September 19, 2003 – present

Related
- Expedition Robinson; Supervivientes; Survivor (American TV series)

L'isola dei famosi (Italian: [ˈliːzola dei faˈmoːzi, -si]; Italian for The Celebrity Island or The island of the famous) is an Italian reality show, first aired on Rai 2 in 2003, before moving to Canale 5 in 2015. This program is the Italian Survivor for celebrities.

== The program ==
The first eight seasons of the show, broadcast from 2003 to 2011, were aired on Rai 2 and hosted by Simona Ventura: after her departure in June 2011 to Sky Italia the program underwent a big change in the format; starting in the ninth season in 2012, the program had two new hosts, Nicola Savino in the studio of Rai 2 and former winner Vladimir Luxuria from the island; in 2015 both were replaced: Alessia Marcuzzi is the host in the studio, while Alberto "Alvin" Bonato is the host from the island. Alvin was replaced in 2017 by Stefano Bettarini, Ventura's former husband. Bettarini was replaced in 2018 by Stefano De Martino, former husband of Belén Rodríguez, therefore in 2019 De Martino was replaced by Alvin. Following the spread of COVID-19 in the winter of 2020, Mediaset decided to cancel this program due to social distancing rules; in 2021 Marcuzzi, as host in the studio, and Alvin, as host from the island, were replaced by Ilary Blasi and Massimiliano Rosolino. Blasi in 2022 kept her position as host in the studio while Rosolino was replaced by Alvin, who came back, for the fourth time, as host from the island.

=== Format ===
L'isola dei famosi is the Italian version of the international format of Survivor, created by Charlie Parsons. In February 2001, a show with a very similar format, called Survivor, was aired on Italia 1 and hosted by two journalist of TG5, Benedetta Corbi (as host in the studio) and Pietro Suber (as host from the island), but this program failed in TV ratings and was cancelled after one season. The first three seasons of L'isola took place in the Dominican Republic on the Samaná Peninsula. The show moved from the 4th to 6th season to Cayos Cochinos, Honduras. Due to the 2009 Honduran coup, however, the 7th season of the show was held in the Corn Islands, Nicaragua only to return to Honduras from the 8th season.

In L'isola dei famosi, a group of celebrity competitors (and non-celebrity competitors as well, in certain seasons) must survive on a desert island with no facilities. Competitors must build shelter, procure food and water, and find ways to maintain warmth. Candidates have a basic survival kit which, through group efforts, can be enhanced with new objects. Once a week there is a challenge winner, determined through contests of skill, balance, strength, or other factors. The competitor(s) who wins the week's challenge becomes immune from the elimination: a live nomination takes place every week, in which competitors are gradually eliminated. The last remaining contenders compete for the final prize during the season finale. Usually a portion of the final prize is donated to charity. Note that each contestant is paid by the production based on how many weeks he/she participates in the reality show.

== Series details ==
Seasons	Network	Presenter		Launch date	Finale date	Episodes	Days	Opinionists				Sent	Castaways	Director	Prize	Location	Winner
Seasons	Network	Presenter		Launch date	Finale date	Episodes	Days	In the studio			Connecting	Sent	Castaways	Director	Prize	Location	Winner
1	Rai 2	Simona Ventura		19 settembre 2003	14 novembre 2003	9	57	Alfonso Signorini	Pierluigi Diaco	Selvaggia Lucarelli	Not present	Marco Mazzocchi	11	Egidio Romio	€200,000	Samaná (Dominican Republic)	Walter Nudo
1	Rai 2	Simona Ventura		19 settembre 2003	14 novembre 2003	9	57	Alfonso Signorini	Andrea G. Pinketts	Maria Venturi	Not present	Marco Mazzocchi	11	Egidio Romio	€200,000	Samaná (Dominican Republic)	Walter Nudo
2	Rai 2	Simona Ventura		17 September 2004 (Note: The first episode of 17 September 2004 ended early due to Hurricane Jeanne which hit the Dominican Republic and the peninsula of Samaná, while the disembarkation of the shipwrecked took place in the episode of 24 September.)	19 novembre 2004	9	57	Alfonso Signorini	Luca Giurato	Antonio Mazzi	Not present	Massimo Caputi	13	Egidio Romio	€200,000	Samaná (Dominican Republic)	Sergio Múñiz
2	Rai 2	Simona Ventura		17 September 2004	19 novembre 2004	9	57	Alfonso Signorini	Aldo Biscardi	Sandro Mayer	Not present	Massimo Caputi	13	Egidio Romio	€200,000	Samaná (Dominican Republic)	Sergio Múñiz
2	Rai 2	Simona Ventura		17 September 2004	19 novembre 2004	9	57	Alfonso Signorini	Bruno Vespa	Giada De Blanck	Not present	Massimo Caputi	13	Egidio Romio	€200,000	Samaná (Dominican Republic)	Sergio Múñiz
3	Rai 2	Simona Ventura		21 settembre 2005	16 November 2005	9	57	Antonella Elia			Not present	Massimo Caputi	15	Egidio Romio	€200,000	Samaná (Dominican Republic)	Lory Del Santo
4	Rai 2	Simona Ventura		13 September 2006	8 November 2006	9	57	Nicola Savino	Michele Cucuzza	Nancy Dell'Olio	Not present	Paolo Brosio	19	Egidio Romio	€200,000	Cayos Cochinos (Honduras)	Luca Calvani
4	Rai 2	Simona Ventura		13 September 2006	8 November 2006	9	57	Nicola Savino	Lory Del Santo	Katia Ricciarelli	Not present	Paolo Brosio	19	Egidio Romio	€200,000	Cayos Cochinos (Honduras)	Luca Calvani
4	Rai 2	Simona Ventura		13 September 2006	8 November 2006	9	57	Nicola Savino	Cesare Cadeo	Elena Santarelli	Not present	Paolo Brosio	19	Egidio Romio	€200,000	Cayos Cochinos (Honduras)	Luca Calvani
4	Rai 2	Simona Ventura		13 September 2006	8 November 2006	9	57	Nicola Savino	Alessandro Meluzzi	Michela Rocco di Torrepadula	Not present	Paolo Brosio	19	Egidio Romio	€200,000	Cayos Cochinos (Honduras)	Luca Calvani
4	Rai 2	Simona Ventura		13 September 2006	8 November 2006	9	57	Nicola Savino	Riccardo Rossi	Antonio Mazza	Not present	Paolo Brosio	19	Egidio Romio	€200,000	Cayos Cochinos (Honduras)	Luca Calvani
4	Rai 2	Simona Ventura		13 September 2006	8 November 2006	9	57	Nicola Savino	Fabio Canino	Maria Giovanna Elmi	Not present	Paolo Brosio	19	Egidio Romio	€200,000	Cayos Cochinos (Honduras)	Luca Calvani
4	Rai 2	Simona Ventura		13 September 2006	8 November 2006	9	57	Nicola Savino	Alba Parietti		Not present	Paolo Brosio	19	Egidio Romio	€200,000	Cayos Cochinos (Honduras)	Luca Calvani
4	Rai 2	Simona Ventura		13 September 2006	8 November 2006	9	57	Nicola Savino	Platinette	Alessandro Rostagno	Not present	Paolo Brosio	19	Egidio Romio	€200,000	Cayos Cochinos (Honduras)	Luca Calvani
5	Rai 2	Simona Ventura		19 September 2007	28 November 2007	11	71	Mara Venier	Alfonso Signorini	Sandro Mayer	Not present	Francesco Facchinetti	18	Egidio Romio	€200,000	Cayos Cochinos (Honduras)	Manuela Villa
5	Rai 2	Simona Ventura		19 September 2007	28 November 2007	11	71	Mara Venier	Gianluca Nicoletti	Alda D'Eusanio	Not present	Francesco Facchinetti	18	Egidio Romio	€200,000	Cayos Cochinos (Honduras)	Manuela Villa
6	Rai 2	Simona Ventura		15 September 2008	24 November 2008	11	71	Mara Venier	Luca Giurato	Pamela Prati	Not present	Filippo Magnini	23	Egidio Romio	€200,000	Cayos Cochinos (Honduras)	Vladimir Luxuria
7	Rai 2	Simona Ventura		24 February 2010	5 May 2010	11	71	Mara Venier	Adriano Aragozzini	Antonia Dell'Atte	Not present	Rossano Rubicondi	22	Egidio Romio	€200,000	Corn Islands (Nicaragua)	Daniele Battaglia
7	Rai 2	Simona Ventura		24 February 2010	5 May 2010	11	71	Mara Venier	Gabriella Sassone	Pierluigi Diaco	Not present	Rossano Rubicondi	22	Egidio Romio	€200,000	Corn Islands (Nicaragua)	Daniele Battaglia
7	Rai 2	Simona Ventura		24 February 2010	5 May 2010	11	71	Mara Venier	Rocco Barocco	Monica Setta	Not present	Rossano Rubicondi	22	Egidio Romio	€200,000	Corn Islands (Nicaragua)	Daniele Battaglia
7	Rai 2	Simona Ventura		24 February 2010	5 May 2010	11	71	Mara Venier	Claudio Lippi	Nadège du Bospertus	Not present	Rossano Rubicondi	22	Egidio Romio	€200,000	Corn Islands (Nicaragua)	Daniele Battaglia
7	Rai 2	Simona Ventura		24 February 2010	5 May 2010	11	71	Mara Venier	Andrea Pucci	Cristiano Malgioglio	Not present	Francesco Facchinetti	22	Egidio Romio	€200,000	Corn Islands (Nicaragua)	Daniele Battaglia
8	Rai 2	Simona Ventura (Note: Replaced by Nicola Savino for the seventh episode of 29 March 2011.)	Nicola Savino (Note: Replaces Simona Ventura for the seventh episode of 29 March 2011.)	14 February 2011	26 April 2011	11	72	Vladimir Luxuria	Alba Parietti		Not present	Daniele Battaglia	22	Egidio Romio	€200,000	Cayos Cochinos (Honduras)	Giorgia Palmas
9	Rai 2	Nicola Savino		25 January 2012	5 April 2012	11	72	Diego Passoni	Lucilla Agosti	Laura Barriales	Not present	Vladimir Luxuria	20	Egidio Romio	€200,000	Cayos Cochinos (Honduras)	Antonella Elia
9	Rai 2	Nicola Savino		25 January 2012	5 April 2012	11	72	Diego Passoni	Nina Morić	Barbara De Rossi	Not present	Vladimir Luxuria	20	Egidio Romio	€200,000	Cayos Cochinos (Honduras)	Antonella Elia
10	Canale 5	Alessia Marcuzzi		26 January 2015 (Note: The first episode of 26 January 2015 ended around 10:05 pm due to bad weather in Honduras, while the disembarkation of the shipwrecked took place in the episode of 2 February.)	23 March 2015	8	50	Mara Venier	Alfonso Signorini		Not present	Alvin	14	Roberto Cenci	€100,000	Cayos Cochinos (Honduras)	Le Donatella (Giulia and Silvia Provvedi)
11	Canale 5	Alessia Marcuzzi		9 March 2016	9 May 2016	10	62	Mara Venier	Alfonso Signorini		Not present	Alvin	18	Roberto Cenci	€100,000	Cayos Cochinos (Honduras)	Giacobbe Fragomeni
12	Canale 5	Alessia Marcuzzi		31 January 2017	11 April 2017	11	73	Vladimir Luxuria			Not present	Stefano Bettarini	14	Roberto Cenci	€100,000	Cayos Cochinos (Honduras)	Raz Degan
13	Canale 5	Alessia Marcuzzi		22 January 2018	16 April 2018	13	85	Mara Venier	Daniele Bossari		Gialappa's Band	Stefano De Martino	20	Roberto Cenci	€100,000	Cayos Cochinos (Honduras)	Nino "Gaspare" Formicola
14	Canale 5	Alessia Marcuzzi		24 January 2019	1 April 2019	12	68	Alda D'Eusanio	Alba Parietti		Gialappa's Band	Alvin	23	Paolo Riccadonna	€100,000	Cayos Cochinos (Honduras)	Marco Maddaloni
15	Canale 5	Ilary Blasi		15 March 2021	7 June 2021	22	85	Iva Zanicchi	Elettra Lamborghini	Tommaso Zorzi	Not present	Massimiliano Rosolino	26	Roberto Cenci	€100,000	Cayos Cochinos (Honduras)	Simone "Awed" Paciello
16	Canale 5	Ilary Blasi		21 March 2022	27 June 2022	25	99	Nicola Savino	Vladimir Luxuria		Not present	Alvin	32	Roberto Cenci	€100,000	Cayos Cochinos (Honduras)	Nicolas Vaporidis
17	Canale 5	Ilary Blasi		17 April 2023	19 June 2023	10	64	Enrico Papi	Vladimir Luxuria		Not present	Alvin	18	Roberto Cenci	€100,000	Cayos Cochinos (Honduras)	Marco Mazzoli
18	Canale 5	Vladimir Luxuria		8 April 2024	5 June 2024	14	59	Sonia Bruganelli	Dario Maltese		Not present	Elenoire Casalegno	24	Roberto Cenci	€100,000	Cayos Cochinos (Honduras)	Aras Şenol
19	Canale 5	Veronica Gentili		7 May 2025	2 July 2025	10	57	Simona Ventura			Not present	Pierpaolo Pretelli	22	Roberto Cenci	€100,000	Cayos Cochinos (Honduras)	Cristina Plevani

== TV ratings ==
Season	Average Viewers	Share
1	6,357,000	26.98%
2	7,479,000	32.73%
3	7,643,000	35.25%
4	4,972,000	25.88%
5	5,207,000	23.75%
6	5,037,000	22.39%
7	4,391,000	19.94%
8	3,908,000	15.70%
9	3,574,000	14.52%
10	5,256,000	25.08%
11	4,270,000	22.39%
12	4,003,000	20.96%
13	4,456,000	24.07%
14	2,820,000	16.39%
15	3,067,000	18.30%
16	2,489,000	18.52%
17	2,515,000	19.51%
