= L'isola dei famosi season 1 =

L'isola dei famosi
- Season 1
- Presented by: Simona Ventura (in the studio); Marco Mazzocchi (from the island)
- No. of days: 57
- No. of castaways: 11
- Winner: Walter Nudo
- Runner-up: Giada De Blanck
- Location: Samaná, Dominican Republic
- No. of episodes: 9

Release
- Original network: Rai 2
- Original release: September 19 – November 14, 2003

Season chronology
- Next → Season 2

L'isola dei famosi 1 is the first edition of the reality television L'isola dei famosi and the Italian version of the reality show franchise Survivor, aired in prime time on Rai 2 from 19 September to 14 November 2003, hosted by Simona Ventura, supported in the studio by columnists Alfonso Signorini, Pierluigi Diaco, Selvaggia Lucarelli, Andrea G. Pinketts and Maria Venturi, and with the participation of the correspondent Marco Mazzocchi. It lasted 57 days, had 11 castaways and 9 episodes and was held in Samaná (Dominican Republic).

The stories of the castaways were broadcast by Rai 2 every Friday in prime time, while the broadcast of the daily strips in the day-time was entrusted to Rai 2.

The edition ended with the victory of Walter Nudo, who was awarded the prize money of €200,000.

== Contestants ==
The age of the contestants refers to the time of landing on the island.

Contestant	Age	Profession	Birthplace	Day entered	Day exited	Status
Walter Nudo	33	Actor	Montréal, Canada	8	57	Winner
Giada De Blanck	22	Model, TV personality	Rome	1	57	Runner-up
Adriano Pappalardo	58	Actor, songwriter	Copertino	1	57	3th Place
Davide Silvestri	22	Actor	Milan	1	57	4th Place
Carmen Russo	44	Dancer, actress, showgirl	Genoa	1	43	6th Eliminated
Maria Teresa Ruta	43	Showgirl, TV presenter, journalist, writer	Turin	1	36	5th Eliminated
Susanna Torretta	32	TV personality	Bollate	1	29	4th Eliminated
Fabio Testi	62	Actor	Peschiera del Garda	1	22	3rd Eliminated
Barbara Chiappini	28	Actress, showgirl, model	Piacenza	1	15	2nd Eliminated
Stefano Tacconi	46	Former football player	Perugia	1	8	1st Eliminated
Rocco Maurizio Anaclerio (DJ Ringo)	42	Disc jockey, radio host, TV personality	Paderno Dugnano	1	4	Walked

== Nominations table ==
	Week 1	Week 2	Week 3	Week 4	Week 5	Week 6	Week 7		Week 8 Final	Nominations received
Leader	–	Davide	Giada	Adriano		Giada		–		Nominations received
Walter	Not on Island	Exempt	Adriano	Davide	Carmen	Davide	Adriano	Nominated	Winner (Day 57)	20
Giada	Maria Teresa; Stefano	Carmen	Fabio	Maria Teresa	Maria Teresa	Carmen	Davide	Nominated	Runner-up (Day 57)	3
Adriano	Maria Teresa; Stefano	Carmen	Walter	Susanna	Walter	Walter	Walter	Nominated	3rd Place (Day 57)	4
Davide	Maria Teresa; Stefano	Barbara	Walter	Susanna	Maria Teresa	Walter	Walter	4rd Place (Day 57)		5
Carmen	Adriano; Susanna	Susanna	Susanna	Giada	Maria Teresa	Walter	Eliminated (Day 43)			11
Maria Teresa	Davide; Susanna	Susanna	Walter	Giada	Davide	Eliminated (Day 36)				14
Susanna	Maria Teresa; Stefano	Carmen	Walter	Giada	Eliminated (Day 29)					8
Fabio	Maria Teresa; Ringo	Carmen	Walter	Eliminated (Day 22)						2
Barbara	Adriano; Fabio	Fabio	Eliminated (Day 15)							2
Stefano	Maria Teresa; Susanna	Eliminated (Day 8)								4
Ringo	Barbara; Maria Teresa	Walked (Day 4)								1
Nominated by Tribe	Maria Teresa; Stefano	Carmen	Walter	Giada	Maria Teresa	Walter	Walter	–		
Nominated by Leader	–	Barbara	Fabio	Susanna	Walter	Carmen	Davide	–		
Automatically Nominated	–							Adriano; Giada; Walter	Giada; Walter	
Eliminated	Stefano; 60% to eliminate	Barbara; 51% to eliminate	Fabio; 75% to eliminate	Susanna; 59% to eliminate	Maria Teresa; 70% to eliminate	Carmen; 64% to eliminate	Davide; 90% to eliminate	Adriano; 60% to eliminate	Giada; 13% to win	
Eliminated	Stefano; 60% to eliminate	Barbara; 51% to eliminate	Fabio; 75% to eliminate	Susanna; 59% to eliminate	Maria Teresa; 70% to eliminate	Carmen; 64% to eliminate	Davide; 90% to eliminate	Adriano; 60% to eliminate	Walter; 87% to win	

== TV Ratings ==
Episode	Date	Viewers	Share
1	September 19, 2003	4,324,000	20.84%
2	September 26, 2003	4,181,000	17.64%
3	October 3, 2003	4,725,000	20.18%
4	October 10, 2003	5,231,000	22.39%
5	October 17, 2003	5,694,000	23.33%
6	October 24, 2003	6,719,000	28.11%
7	October 31, 2003	7,448,000	32.21%
Semifinal	November 7, 2003	8,450,000	34.65%
Final	November 14, 2003	10,451,000	42.75%
Average		6,358,111	26.89%
Galà - Tutti a casa	November 21, 2003	6,573,000	25.69%
L'isola dei famosi - Il film	November 28, 2003	2,984,000	12.14%
