= Mauro Leonardi =

Italian priest, writer and commentator (born 1959)

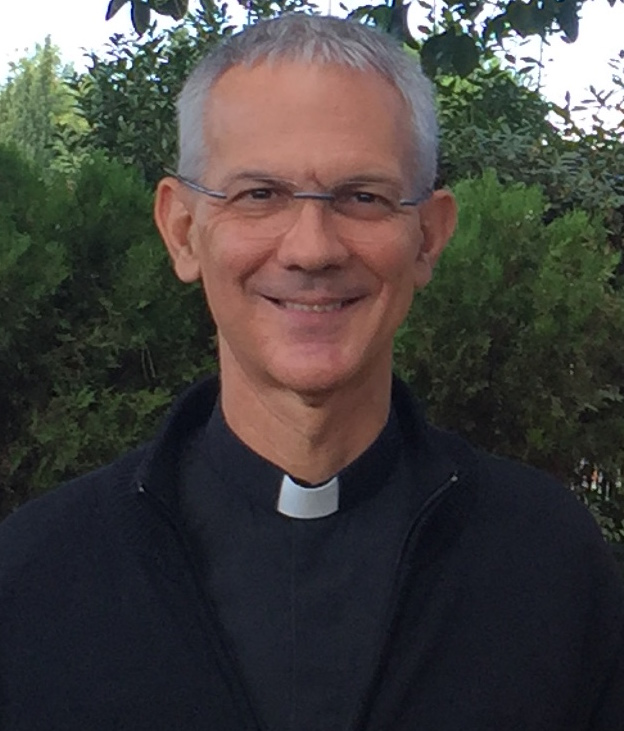
- Mauro Leonardi
- Born: 4 April 1959 (age 67); Como, Italia
- Occupations: Priest, writer, commentator

Mauro Leonardi (born 4 April 1959 in Como) is an Italian priest, writer and commentator.

== Biography ==
He was ordained a priest by John Paul II in 1988 and lived in Rome. Since 2015 he lives in the suburban district of the Italian capital, where he does his pastoral work. He collaborates in the formation of a non-profit organization and with a suburban parish.

His first novel is Quare, a science fiction novel (Ares, 2000). In 2003 he released Half an hour of prayer (in Italian Mezz'ora di orazione, Ares). In 2011 comes to light Like Jesus (in Italian Come Gesù, Ares), which gives its name to his blog. In 2012 he released his second novel, Abelis (Lindau). The Lord of Dreams (in Italian Il Signore dei Sogni, Ares, 2015) is his last essay. From 6 December 2013 to 11 November 2016, he published on his blog a collection of 152 poems, entitled The diary of Paci (in Italian Il diario di Paci). The most famous poem is "Love is not enough to love" (in Italian L'amore non basta per amare), erroneously attributed to Frida Kahlo. In 2020 he wrote an essay entitled "Le religioni spiegate ai giovani. Convivenza e dialogo nella diversità" (in english "Religions explained to young people. Coexistence and dialogue in diversity) for Diarkos.

=== Activity ===
His blog Come Gesù (in English Like Jesus) has been online since 2011. He writes regularly in some Spanish and Italian newspapers as an Agi (A Governmental information agency), the Italian edition of Metro International and in the daily newspaper of the Episcopal Conference of Italy (Avvenire). He writes columns on several family weeklies (Novella 2000, Gente, MIO). He also intervened during some television broadcasts of entertainment and current debates.

== Disputes ==
He has been the subject of numerous controversies by some Catholics in different parts of the world who say that Leonardi wants to change the Catechism of the Catholic Church on the issue of homosexuality: on the contrary he says that, following the teachings of Pope Francis, simply look respectfully at this reality. He has been the object of attacks by some Catholics for interviewing Vladimir Luxuria who, on that occasion, recounted his conversion to Catholicism.

== Works ==
- Quare (Ares, 2000, ISBN 88-8155-195-0)
- Mezz'ora di orazione (Ares, 2003, ISBN 978-88-8155-646-5)
- Come Gesù (Ares, 2011, ISBN 978-88-8155-533-8)
- Abelis (Lindau, 2012, ISBN 978-88-7180-998-4)
- Il Signore dei Sogni (Ares, 2015, ISBN 978-88-8155-672-4)
- Una giornata di Susanna (Cooper, 2018, ISBN 978-88-7394-240-5)
- Le religioni spiegate ai giovani. Convivenza e dialogo nella diversità (Diarkos, 2020, ISBN 978-88-3217-677-3)
- Il diario di Paci. L'amore non basta per amare (KDP, 2020, ISBN 979-86-9095-096-5)
- Né santi né demoni. Interviste “eretiche” sul bene e sul male (Reality Book, 2020 ISBN 978-88-9528-463-7)
- Via Crucis di Maria (Amen, 2021, ISBN 978-88-9606-350-7)
- Via Crucis vista con gli occhi d alcuni personaggi del vangelo (Amen, 2021, ISBN 978-88-9606-351-4)
- Il Vangelo secondo TikTok. Usare i social e restare liberi (Terra Santa, 2021, ISBN 978-88-6240-860-8)
- Cento volte tanto. Diventa manager della tua vita con il Vangelo (Ed. San Paolo, 2023, ISBN 978-88-9224-075-9)
- Il granello di senape. Regno di Dio o impero di Dio? (Ed. San Paolo, 2025, ISBN 978-88-9224-653-9)
