= Michele Cucuzza =

Italian journalist and television presenter

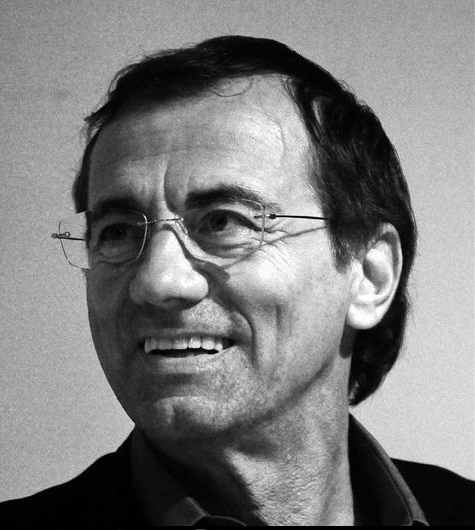
Michele Cucuzza

Michele Cucuzza (born in 1952) is an Italian journalist, news speaker and television presenter.

Born in Catania, the son of the volcanologist Salvatore Cucuzza Silvestri, Cucuzza became professional journalist in 1979 and he started his career for the radio Radio Popolare. In 1985 he became a collaborator of RAI TV, working as a redactor, a correspondent and for about ten years as a news speaker of TG2. In 1998 he became the presenter of La Vita in diretta, a Rai 1 infotainment program broadcast in the afternoon. He considers himself a "dubious Christian" after a long personal spirititual quest.

== Biography ==
Son of Salvatore Cucuzza Silvestri, a volcanologist and professor at the University of Catania, he has two daughters, Carlotta and Matilde. He began as a journalist in Sicily at the daily Catania Sera, covering Society issues. Moved to Milan in 1973 and collaborated with the newspaper Il Giorno and with the press office of the Italian Labour Union union. In 1976 he was among the founders of Radio Popolare with Piero Scaramucci, Nini Briglia, Gad Lerner and others. He graduated in modern literature from the University of Milan. In 1979 he became a professional journalist, enrolled in the Lazio Order of Journalists.

In 1983 he began working with RAI, also in Milan, where he was hired as an editor. Until 1987, Cucuzza produced reports and links for the various public service, radio and television newspapers. It follows the major news events of those years, from terrorism, the Tortora case, the Banco Ambrosiano affairs, the death of Michele Sindona, and the 1987 Valtellina flood. Called to Rome in 1987 to anchor TG2, he is also a foreign correspondent, making reports, links and specials from France, Poland, Hungary, the Czech Republic, Saudi Arabia, the United States, and India, and following the major social and political events and of the period.

Since 2003 he has become a testimonial for the Romagnolo Oncology Institute in Rimini. He is also a testimonial for the non-profit organization “Active as before.” In 2004, he is a voice actor of some news segments for the Pixar animated film The Incredibles. From September 2008 to May 2011 he co-hosts Unomattina with Eleonora Daniele on Rai 1. From 2010 to 2012 he co-hosts with Chiara Giallonardo the current affairs radio show Radio2 Days. In 2011 in Reggio Calabria, he is director of Legalitàlia, an anti-mafia meeting promoted by the Scopelliti Foundation and the youth movement ‘Ammazzateci tutti’.

From 2011 to 2015 he coordinates and presents the Italy–USA Foundation Prize at the Chamber of Deputies (Italy). In August 2012 he is with Barbara De Rossi a cooperator for Intersos in the Makpandu refugee camp in South Sudan. In the election for President of Italy on April 18, 2013, he receives two votes. In 2013 he hosts from the microphones of the Roman radio station Qlub Radio 89.3 Fm, the daily program Rosso di sera. On Dec. 4 and Dec. 12, 2013, she co-hosts with Rula Jebreal the television program Mission, broadcast in prime time on Rai 1. A columnist for the Corriere dell'Umbria, she has held an interview column in Diva&Donna.

Since 2014 he has been hosting with Tiziana Di Simone Manuale d'Europa, broadcast on Rai Radio 1 on Saturday and Sunday mornings. The program is also broadcast on Rai GR Parlamento on Saturdays at 2 p.m. From November 2016 to May 2019 he hosted, with Mary De Gennaro, Buon pomeriggio on Telenorba. In 2017, he hosts a broadcast on Retesole television. On June 17, 2017 in Cinisi, he participates as jury president in the National Literary Artists for Giuseppe Impastato Competition. Since January 3, 2018, he has been editor of the San Marino daily RepubblicaSm. Since January 17, 2018, he has been a regular guest on 90 Special, a program reminiscent of the 1990s aired on Italia 1 hosted by Nicola Savino.

In May 2019, he presided over the award ceremony of the National Literary Artists for Peppino Impastato Competition in Milan, as jury president (position confirmed for the 3rd edition in Monza). In September 2019, he was awarded the Lifetime Achievement Award Menotti Art Festival Spoleto (heir to the Festival of the Two Worlds). Since September 2019 he has been an official testimonial of the City Angels association. From January 2020, he participated in the fourth edition of Grande Fratello VIP, staying in the house for 34 days. Since January 9, 2022, he has been hosting on Antenna Sicilia the 7:30 a.m. and 1:30 p.m. editions of TG Sicilia, and since July 12, 2023, he has also been its director. On October 1, 2022, he presides over the award ceremony of the 4th edition of the national literary competition Artisti per Giuseppe Impastato in Milan, as president of the jury.

He considers himself a “doubting Christian” and is a member of the Rotary International of Catania.
