= Daniele Battaglia =

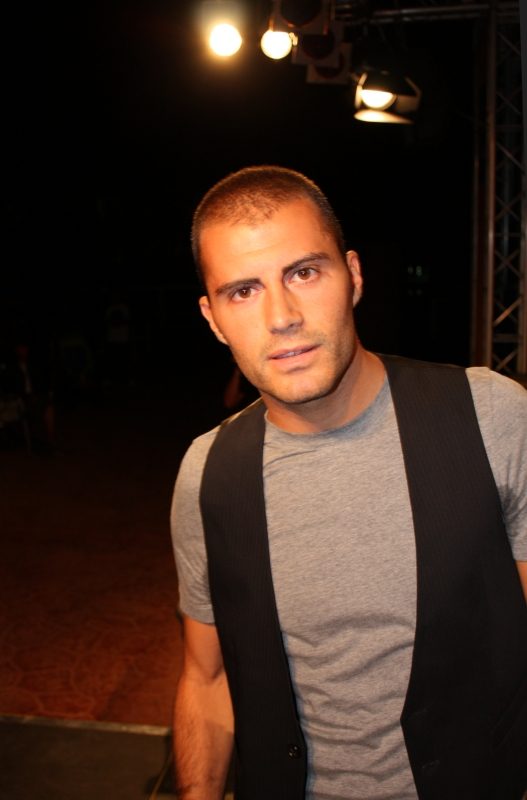
- Daniele Battaglia (2008)

Background information
- Born: Daniele Battaglia; 21 July 1981 (age 44); Reggio Emilia, Italy
- Genres: Pop
- Occupation: Singer

Daniele Battaglia (born 21 July 1981) is an Italian singer and television personality. In 2011, Battaglia participated in and won the seventh season of the RAI 2 reality show L'isola dei famosi.

He is the son of the musician Dodi Battaglia.
