= Unomattina =

Italian morning television show

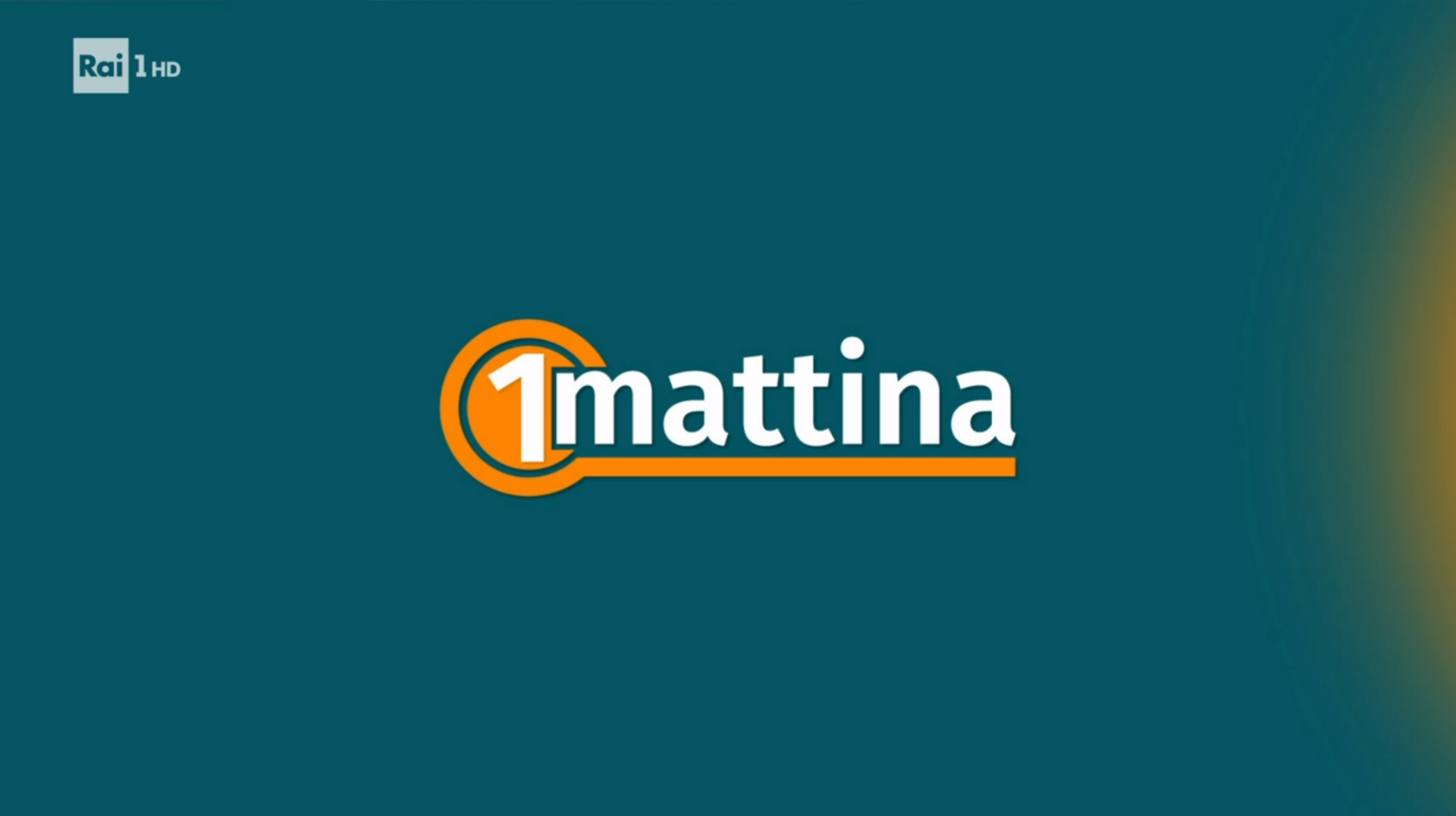
- Logo of the program in use since the 37th edition
- Also known as: Raiuno mattina (2000-2001)
- Genre: Morning news and talk
- Created by: Piero Badaloni, Giorgio Calabrese, Nino Crescenti, Michele Guardì
- Directed by: Maria Cristina Bordin
- Presented by: Daniela Ferolla, Massimiliano Ossini
- Country of origin: Italy
- Original language: Italian
- No. of seasons: 38

Production
- Executive producer: Lucia De Marchi
- Production location: Rome
- Running time: 285 minutes

Original release
- Network: Rai 1
- Release: 22 December 1986 – present

Unomattina (also spelled Uno Mattina, styled 1Mattina) is a long-running Italian morning television show, broadcast by Rai 1 since 22 December 1986, currently hosted by Massimiliano Ossini e Daniela Ferolla. The program is broadcast from studio 3 of the CPTV Rai in Saxa Rubra, Rome, and is broadcast from Monday to Friday.

== History ==
The first-morning program of the Italian national public television was created to counterprogram the successful morning schedule of Fininvest. Its contents include news, weather forecasts, interviews, and talk show segments. The first edition was presented by Elisabetta Gardini and Piero Badaloni, with the segments set in Milan studios hosted by Alessandro Cecchi Paone and Sabina Ciuffini. In the subsequent season's various presenters, alternated, including Daniela Ferolla, Luca Giurato, Livia Azzariti, Puccio Corona, Antonella Clerici, Maria Teresa Ruta, Rosanna Lambertucci, Franco Di Mare, Elisa Isoardi, Michele Cucuzza, Paola Saluzzi, Roberta Capua, Caterina Balivo, Eleonora Daniele. Since 1992 the program has a summer spin-off called Unomattina estate.

== Pope Francis's phone call ==
On 22 December 2016, the thirtieth anniversary of the program's first broadcast, Pope Francis telephoned to offer his best wishes for the milestone and for the forthcoming Christmas holidays. He was the second pontiff to speak live on the phone on an Italian television after John Paul II, who on 13 October 1998 thanked the program Porta a Porta for the special on his twenty-year pontificate.
