= Lucilla Agosti =

Italian radio and television presenter and actress (born 1978)

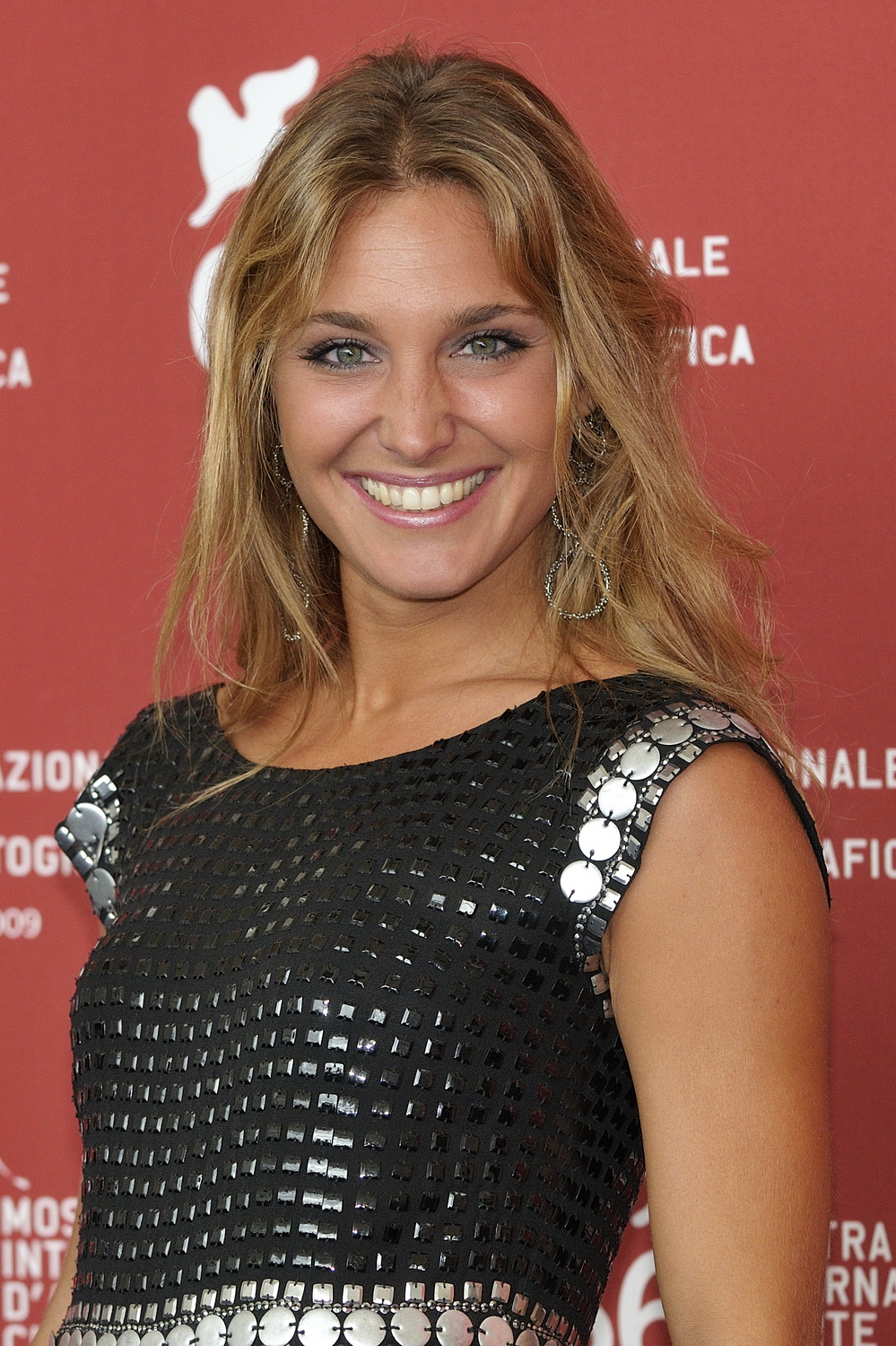
- Agosti in September 2009
- Born: 8 September 1978 (age 47); Poggibonsi, Italy
- Occupations: Presenter; actress
- Years active: 2000–present
- Partner: Andrea Romiti
- Children: 3

Lucilla Agosti (born 8 September 1978) is an Italian radio and television presenter and actress.

== Biography ==
Born in Poggibonsi, daughter of Edoardo Agosti - radiologist - and of a professor of drawing and art history, Lucilla began working as an actress, acting, among other things, in an exhibition de The Strange Couple, a famous comedy by Neil Simon. Subsequently, at a very young age, she moved to Rome working in Cinecittà and took on one of the first Network A auditions and was chosen to conduct Azzurro, a program dedicated to Italian music and artists, from 1 July 2002 to 17 September 2005.

In the summer of 2004 she leads some live evenings: the Main Stage all'Arezzo Wave Love Festival and the final evening of the Voci Domani competition. She also hosts Space Girls on Happy Channel and Guelfi e Ghibellini on Rai 2, and appears as a guest star in an episode of the sitcom Camera Café. With the birth of the new All Music, she abandons the music of Azzurro to take up fashion and lifestyle, at the helm of the show All Moda. She gets film roles in shorts and feature films, appearing in the films The fever (2005), by Alessandro D'Alatri, The Stone Merchant (2006), by Renzo Martinelli, and The Seed of Discord (2008), by Pappi Corsicato, and in short films Parole rubate (2004) and Divini incontri d'orgasmo (2005), both directed by Barbara Caggiati.

Continue to work in various All Music programs: Classifica di..., in which she interviews celebrities from the show revealing their musical preferences, Flycase, in which she accompanies musical guests to discover a nation from a cultural and especially musical point of view and, finally, Tutti nudi, where, dressed as a geisha, comments on the performances of amateur strippers. Furthermore, always on All Music, he participates with Maccio Capatonda in the fake soap opera Intralci. In 2007 she starred with Ale and Franz of Buona la prima, an Italia 1 sit-show based entirely on improvisation. In the same year, she also arrives at Radio Monte Carlo as host of RMC Magazine, together with Max Venegoni. The beginning of 2008 sees her alongside Elio e le Storie Tese in the conduct of the After Festival at the Sanremo Festival.

On All Music she is instead the protagonist of the new comedy-talk Bionda anomala. She had also been chosen as the host of the 2008 Festivalbar, paired with Teo Mammucari, but the event was later cancelled. In April 2009 she leads on Raidue Italian Academy 2, a talent show entirely dedicated to dance. In 2010 she joined the cast of Distretto di Polizia 10 in the role of Inspector Barbara Rostagno under "X Tuscolano". In the winter of 2012, she was also engaged in television as a commentator of the ninth edition of reality L'isola dei famosi, on Rai 2, this experience has brought great popularity and has consecrated it to the general public. At the beginning of 2013, she led the seventh season of the Italia 1 Mistero program with Jane Alexander. From 4 May 2015, he has hosted the new program Donna Moderna Live on La5, a lifestyle show inspired by the magazine of the same name Donna Moderna with Agosti who in these 40 episodes advises on new trends. In the same period, she made her debut on Sky with Italia's Got Talent together with Rocco Tanica.

== Private life ==
Lucilla Agosti is linked to Andrea Romiti with whom she had three children: Cleo, born on 31 January 2011, Diego, born on 29 December 2013, and Alma, born on 3 November 2017.

== Television programs ==
- Azzurro (Rete A, 2002)
- All Moda (All Music, 2003–2005)
- Main Stage all'Arezzo Wawe Love Festival (2004)
- Voci domani (2004)
- Space Girls (Happy Channel, 2004)
- Guelfi e ghibellini (Rai 2, 2005)
- Classifica di... (All Music, 2006–2008)
- Flycase (All Music, 2006)
- Buona la prima! (Italia 1, 2007)
- Tutti nudi (All Music, 2007)
- Festival di Sanremo 2008 (DopoFestival) (Rai 1, 2008)
- Bionda anomala (All Music, 2008–2009)
- Scalo 76 (Rai 2, 2008)
- Italian Academy 2 (Rai 2, 2009)
- Scalo 76 Talent (Rai 2, 2009)
- L'isola dei famosi (Rai 2, 2012) Opinionista
- Mistero (Italia 1, 2013)
- Donna Moderna Live (La5, 2015)
- Italia's Got Veramente Talent? (Sky, 2015)
- Tuttigiorni's Got Talent (Sky 2016)
- Grand Tour d'Italia - Sulle orme dell'eccellenza (Rete 4, 2018)
- Borghi ritrovati - Una sfida per una nuova vita (Rete 4, 2019)

== Radio ==
- RMC Magazine (Radio Monte Carlo, 2007–2009)
- R101 (from 2014)
- Capodanno in radio (R101, 2020–2021)

== Filmography ==
=== Cinema ===
- La fabbrica del vapore, directed by Ettore Pasculli (2000)
- La febbre, directed by Alessandro D'Alatri (2005)
- Il mercante di pietre, directed by Renzo Martinelli (2006)
- Il seme della discordia, directed by Pappi Corsicato (2008)
- Armando Testa - Povero ma moderno, directed by Pappi Corsicato (2009)

=== Short films ===
- Parole rubate, directed by Barbara Caggiati (2004)
- Divini incontri d'orgasmo, directed by Barbara Caggiati (2005)
- Colpo di sonno, directed by Stefano Bruno (2009)
- L'amante - 48 ore film project, directed by Giuseppe Peronace (2010)

=== Television ===
- CentoVetrine, various directors (2003–2004)
- Camera Café, various directors (2004) guest star
- Intralci, directed by Maccio Capatonda (2006)
- Buona la prima!, various directors (2007)
- Distretto di Polizia, directed by Alberto Ferrari (2010–2012)
