= Raz Degan =

Israeli-Italian actor, filmmaker, and photographer

- Born: 25 August 1968 (age 57); Kibbutz Sde Nehemia, Israel
- Occupations: Actor; Film director; Cinematographer; Photographer
- Years active: 1990–present
- Known for: The Last Shaman, L'Isola dei Famosi, Raz & The Tribe

Raz Degan (born August 25, 1968) is an Israeli-born actor, film director, cinematographer, and photographer based in Italy. After completing military service, Degan worked internationally as a model before signing with the Milan-based agency Riccardo Gay Model Management, which he has credited with helping build his early recognition in Italy. He has appeared in international productions alongside directors including Oliver Stone and Ermanno Olmi, and directed the 2016 documentary The Last Shaman, executive-produced by Leonardo DiCaprio.

== Career ==
=== Acting and filmmaking ===
Degan made his film debut with an uncredited cameo in Robert Altman's Prêt-à-Porter (1994). He went on to appear in Italian television productions including the miniseries Sorellina e il principe del sogno (1996), directed by Lamberto Bava, and Le ragazze di Piazza di Spagna (1998). In 2004, he portrayed Darius III of Persia in Oliver Stone's Alexander. He also played the lead role in Ermanno Olmi's One Hundred Nails (2007) and starred as Alberto da Giussano in Barbarossa (2009).

In 2016 he directed The Last Shaman, a documentary about Amazonian shamanic healing, executive-produced by Leonardo DiCaprio. The film was later released for on-demand streaming.

=== Photography ===
Degan is also a photographer whose work focuses on indigenous cultures and remote environments; it has been published and exhibited in several countries. His projects have included The Lost Sadhu and Raz in the Urban Jungle.

=== Television ===
In 2010, Degan competed in the sixth season of Ballando con le Stelle and co-hosted the documentary series Mistero alongside Daniele Bossari and Marco Berry. In 2017 he won the twelfth season of L'Isola dei Famosi, the Italian version of Survivor, with 89 percent of the public vote. In 2018 he created, directed, and hosted Raz & The Tribe for Sky Atlantic, a docu-reality series in which he and guests including Asia Argento, Luca Argentero, and Piero Pelù visited remote communities in Ethiopia, Sumatra, and Papua. He joined the cast of the RAI 1 drama Un passo dal cielo for its eighth season, beginning in January 2025.

=== Personal life ===
Degan was born on a kibbutz in northern Israel and has said he grew up amid the country's periods of conflict. In October 2023, he said his family's kibbutz had been evacuated during that month's escalation of the Israeli–Palestinian conflict, and that his elderly father had initially refused to leave.

Degan has lived in a converted trullo in Ostuni, Puglia, where he has described himself as combining acting with farming. As of December 2023, he was in a relationship with a partner named Cindy, describing their relationship as having lasted six years.

== Filmography ==
=== Films ===
Year	Title	Role	Notes
1994	Prêt-à-Porter	Uncredited	Cameo
1996	Call Girl	Inspector Tony Messina	
1998	Coppia omicida	Vito	
1999	Titus	Alarbus	
2004	Alexander	Darius III of Persia	
2007	One Hundred Nails	Il professorino ("The Professor")	
2008	Albakiara	Ispettore Castri	
2009	Barbarossa	Alberto da Giussano	Also known as Sword of War
2011	Forces spéciales	Zaief	
2012	Omamamia	Silvio	
2022	Under the Amalfi Sun	David	

Credits per Rotten Tomatoes.

=== Television ===
Year	Title	Role	Notes
1996	Sorellina e il principe del sogno	Demian	Miniseries, directed by Lamberto Bava
1998	Le ragazze di Piazza di Spagna		Miniseries
2004	Camera Café	Raz	Episode: "Regalo per Patti"
2010	Ballando con le Stelle	Contestant	Season 6
2010–2011	Mistero	Host	Co-hosted with Daniele Bossari and Marco Berry
2017	L'Isola dei Famosi	Contestant	Winner, 12th season
2018	Raz & The Tribe	Host, director	Docu-reality series, Sky Atlantic
2025	Un passo dal cielo 8		Joined the cast in January 2025
