= Luca Giurato =

Italian journalist (1939–2024)

- Born: 23 December 1939; Rome, Italy
- Died: 11 September 2024 (aged 84); Santa Marinella, Italy
- Television: Mezzogiorno in famiglia I fatti vostri Bontà loro Domenica in Unomattina; I raccomandati L'isola dei famosi
- Spouse(s): Gianna Furio (first wife); Daniela Vergara (second wife)
- Children: 1
- Awards: Premio Simpatia

Luca Giurato (23 December 1939 – 11 September 2024) was an Italian journalist and television presenter. He worked for La Stampa and he was vice-director of the TG1 until 1990. Giurato died from a heart attack in Santa Marinella, on 11 September 2024, at the age of 84.
