= Elena Santarelli =

Italian model, television personality and actress

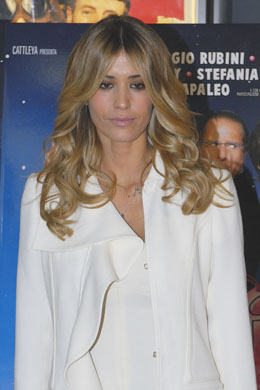
- Born: 18 August 1981 (age 44); Latina, Italy

Elena Santarelli (born 18 August 1981) is an Italian model, television personality and actress.

== Life and career ==
Born in Latina, the niece of footballer Ubaldo Righetti, Santarelli started her career as a catwalk model, working among others for Giorgio Armani, Laura Biagiotti and Gai Mattiolo. She made her television debut as an assistant of Amadeus in the Rai 1 quiz show L'eredità. She later hosted the sport program Stadio Sprint, and in 2005 she participated to the third edition of the Rai 2 reality show L'Isola dei Famosi. The same year, she appeared in a calendar for the magazine Max. Santarelli later hosted several programs, including Total Request Live on MTV and Kalispéra on Canale 5. She is also active as an actress in films, TV-series and on stage. In June 2014 she married footballer Bernardo Corradi. She made her debut as a writer in 2019 with the autobiography Una mamma lo sa, which was followed two years later by Una mamma NON lo sa.
