= Antonella Elia =

Italian actress

- Born: 1 November 1963 (age 62); Turin, Italy
- Occupations: Television and media personality; actress

Antonella Elia (born 1 November 1963) is an Italian television personality and actress.

== Life and career ==
Born in Turin, Italy, Elia started her career as a model and made her television debut in 1989 in a minor role in the TV series The Betrothed. She became first known as the assistant of Corrado in the Canale 5 variety show La Corrida, a role she had between 1990 and 1993. In 1991 she was cast in the successful variety television Non è la RAI, and between 1993 and 1996 she was sidekick of Raimondo Vianello in the Italia 1 program Pressing. She participated in the second edition of the Rai 2 reality show L'isola dei famosi in 2004, and she returned in the 2012 edition, winning the show and donating the 100,000 euro prize to Amnesty International. She is also active in films, TV-series and on stage.

== Filmography ==
=== Film ===
Year	Title	Role(s)	Notes
1990	Parco Valentino	Nuvola	
1991	Tonight in the Building	Alex	
1998	Voglio una donnaaa!	Cecilia	
2004	Ocean's Twelve	Arrested woman	Uncredited
2004	The Aviator	Secretary	
2005	Volcano	Sylvia Diablo	
2009	Buona fortuna	Herself	Cameo

=== Television ===
Year	Title	Role(s)	Notes
1989	The Betrothed	Matilde	Main role
1990–1994; 2011	La Corrida	Herself / Co-host	Variety show (seasons 4–5; 7–8; 19)
1991–1992	Non è la RAI	Herself / Contestant	Musical/variety show
1991	Capodanno con Canale 5	Herself / Co-host	Special
1992	Serata d'amore per San Valentino	Herself / Co-host	Special
1992	Carnevale con Canale 5	Herself / Co-host	Special
1992	La grande festa di Non è la RAI	Herself / Co-host	Special
1992	Telegatto 1992	Herself / Co-host	Annual ceremony
1993	Bulli e pupe	Herself / Performer	Variety show
1993–1996	Pressing	Herself / Co-host	Talk show (seasons 4–6)
1994	Casa Vianello	Herself	Episode: "Raimondo senza cuore"
1994	1994 Giro d'Italia	Herself / Reporter	Special
1994–1995	Karaoke	Herself / Co-host	Variety show (season 3)
1995	1995 FIFA World Player of the Year	Herself / Co-host	Special
1995	Cuori e denari	Herself / Reporter	Variety show
1995–1996	La ruota della fortuna	Herself / Co-host	Game show
1997	Caro maestro	Antonella	Main role (season 2)
2001	Gian Burrasca	Virginia	Television film
2004–2005	Buona Domenica	Herself / Co-host	Variety show (season 17)
2004, 2012	L'isola dei famosi	Herself / Contestant	Reality show (season 2 and 9)
2006–2007	La vita in diretta	Herself / Reporter	Talk show (season 17)
2010	Extra Factor	Herself / Opinionist	The X Factor aftershow
2013–2014	Superbrain	Herself / Co-host	Game show (season 2)
2017	Pechino Express	Herself / Contestant	Reality show (season 6)
2018	Tale e Quale show	Herself / Contestant	Talent show (season 8)
2018	Zecchino d'Oro	Herself / Judge	Annual singing contest
2020–2021	Grande Fratello VIP	Herself / Contestant	Reality show (season 4)
2022	Back to School	Herself / Contestant	Reality show
2026	Grande Fratello VIP	Herself / Contestant – Runner Up	Reality show (season 8)
