= Telegatto =

Italian television award

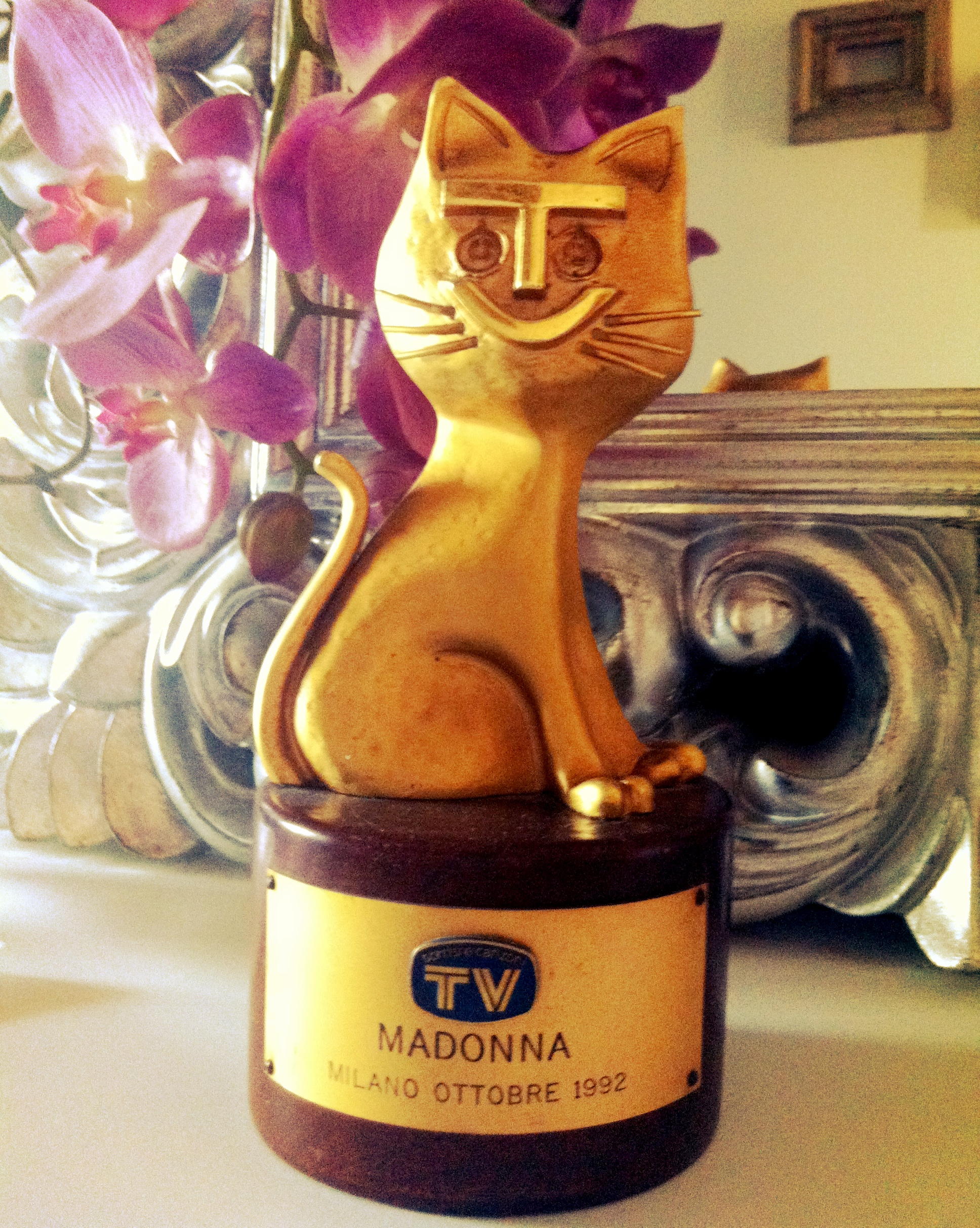
- Telegatto awarded to Madonna in 1992
- Awarded for: Television award
- Country: Italy
- First award: 1984
- Final award: 2008

Telegatto (a composition of television and gatto, meaning "cat", after the trophy, which is a small statue representing a cat), was an Italian television award first conceived in 1971 following the contest Gran Premio internazionale dello Spettacolo, although the first award ceremony wasn't held until 1984. The ceremonies are known as Telegatti, the plural form of Telegatto. They were sponsored by the weekly magazine TV Sorrisi e Canzoni and broadcast on Canale 5. The prize was a golden cat statue with the network's initials on its face, inspired by a cartoon from the television series Super Classifica Show, a cult show in the 1980s and early 1990s. The award ceremony was cancelled in 2009.

On 12 March 2018, on the occasion of a press conference for the photography book dedicated to the event, and a decade after the last edition, the director of TV Sorrisi e Canzoni, Aldo Vitali, hypothesized the return of the event in Milan for October of the same year, to be hosted by Carlo Conti. The show, however, never resurfaced.

== Hosts ==
- 1984: Mike Bongiorno, Cinzia Lenzi, Gabriella Golia, Fabrizia Carminati
- 1985: Mike Bongiorno, Cinzia Lenzi, Gabriella Golia, Alessandra Buzzi, Susanna Messaggio, Fiorella Pierobon
- 1986: Mike Bongiorno, Milly Carlucci
- 1987: Mike Bongiorno, Carol Alt, Renée Simonsen
- 1988: Mike Bongiorno, Gabriella Carlucci
- 1989: Mike Bongiorno, Heather Parisi
- 1990: Corrado, Elisabetta Gardini
- 1991: Corrado, Raffaella Carrà
- 1992: Corrado, Fabrizio Frizzi and Antonella Elia
- 1993: Corrado, Milly Carlucci
- 1994: Corrado, Alba Parietti
- 1995: Corrado, Mara Venier
- 1996: Corrado, Mara Venier
- 1997: Pippo Baudo, Milly Carlucci
- 1998: Pippo Baudo, Milly Carlucci
- 1999: Pippo Baudo, Milly Carlucci
- 2000: Paolo Bonolis, Raffaella Carrà
- 2001: Gerry Scotti, Maria De Filippi
- 2002: Pippo Baudo, Alessia Marcuzzi
- 2003: Pippo Baudo, Alessia Marcuzzi
- 2004: Gerry Scotti, Raffaella Carrà
- 2005: suspended
- 2006: Pippo Baudo, Michelle Hunziker
- 2007: Claudio Bisio, Vanessa Incontrada
- 2008: Pippo Baudo, Michelle Hunziker

== Foreign Telegatto winners ==
- Elton John – 1973 (special Telegatto)
- Paul Newman – 1976
- Barbra Streisand – 1977
- John Travolta – 1978 (special Telegatto)
- Warren Beatty – 1979
- Liza Minnelli – 1982 (special Telegatto)
- Peter Gabriel – 1983
- Bee Gees – 1984
- Dallas – 1984
- Linda Gray – 1984 (portrayal of Sue Ellen Ewing in Dallas)
- Larry Hagman – 1984 (portrayal of J. R. Ewing in Dallas)
- Dallas – 1985
- Dynasty – 1985
- Quo Vadis? – 1985
- Raiders of the Lost Ark – 1985
- V – Visitors – 1985 (union of V and V The Final Battle)
- Dallas – 1986
- V – Visitors – 1986
- Joan Collins for Dynasty – 1986
- Paul McCartney – 1986
- Dallas – 1987
- North and South – 1987
- Mick Jagger – 1987
- Stevie Wonder – 1987
- Capitol – 1987 (special award)
- Dynasty – 1988
- Guiding Light – 1988
- Dynasty – 1989
- Fame – 1989 (special award)
- Happy Days – 1989 (special award)
- Loving – 1989 (special award)
- Tina Turner – 1989
- The Young and the Restless – 1990 (special award)
- Eddie Asner for Lou Grant – 1990
- Sylvester Stallone – 1990
- The Bold and the Beautiful – 1991
- Twin Peaks – 1991
- Robert De Niro – 1991
- Robert Mitchum – 1991 (Lifetime Achievement Award)
- MacGyver – 1992
- Miami Vice – 1992
- Madonna – 1992
- Arnold Schwarzenegger – 1992 (Foreign cinema on TV)
- Beverly Hills, 90210 – 1993
- Perry Mason – 1993
- Michael Douglas – 1993 (Foreign cinema on TV)
- Dustin Hoffman – 1993 (Cinema on TV)
- Beverly Hills, 90210 – 1994
- The Bold and the Beautiful – 1994
- Columbo – 1994
- Magnum, P.I. – 1994
- Beverly Hills, 90210 – 1995
- Kirk Douglas – 1995 (Platinum Award in the "Cult TV" category)
- Steven Seagal – 1995 (Special award for Cinema on TV)
- The Bold and the Beautiful – 1996
- Dallas – 1996
- The X-Files – 1996
- Tony Curtis – 1996 (Platinum Award)
- Joe Pesci – 1996 (Platinum Award)
- The Bold and the Beautiful – 1997 (Soap opera)
- ER – 1997 (Foreign TV series)
- Johnny Depp – 1997 (Foreign cinema on TV)
- Eli Wallach – 1997 (Platinum Award)
- Murder, She Wrote – 1999
- The Simpsons – 2000
- James Coburn – 2000
- George Clooney – 2000
- Elizabeth Taylor – 2001 (Lifetime Achievement Award)
- Robert Wagner for Hart to Hart – 2001 (Cult TV award)
- Sean Connery – 2002 (Special award Cinema on TV)
- Peter O'Toole – 2002 (Special award Cult TV)
- CSI: Crime Scene Investigation – 2003
- Ernest Borgnine – 2003
- Susan Sarandon – 2003
