= Vladimir Luxuria =

Italian actress and politician

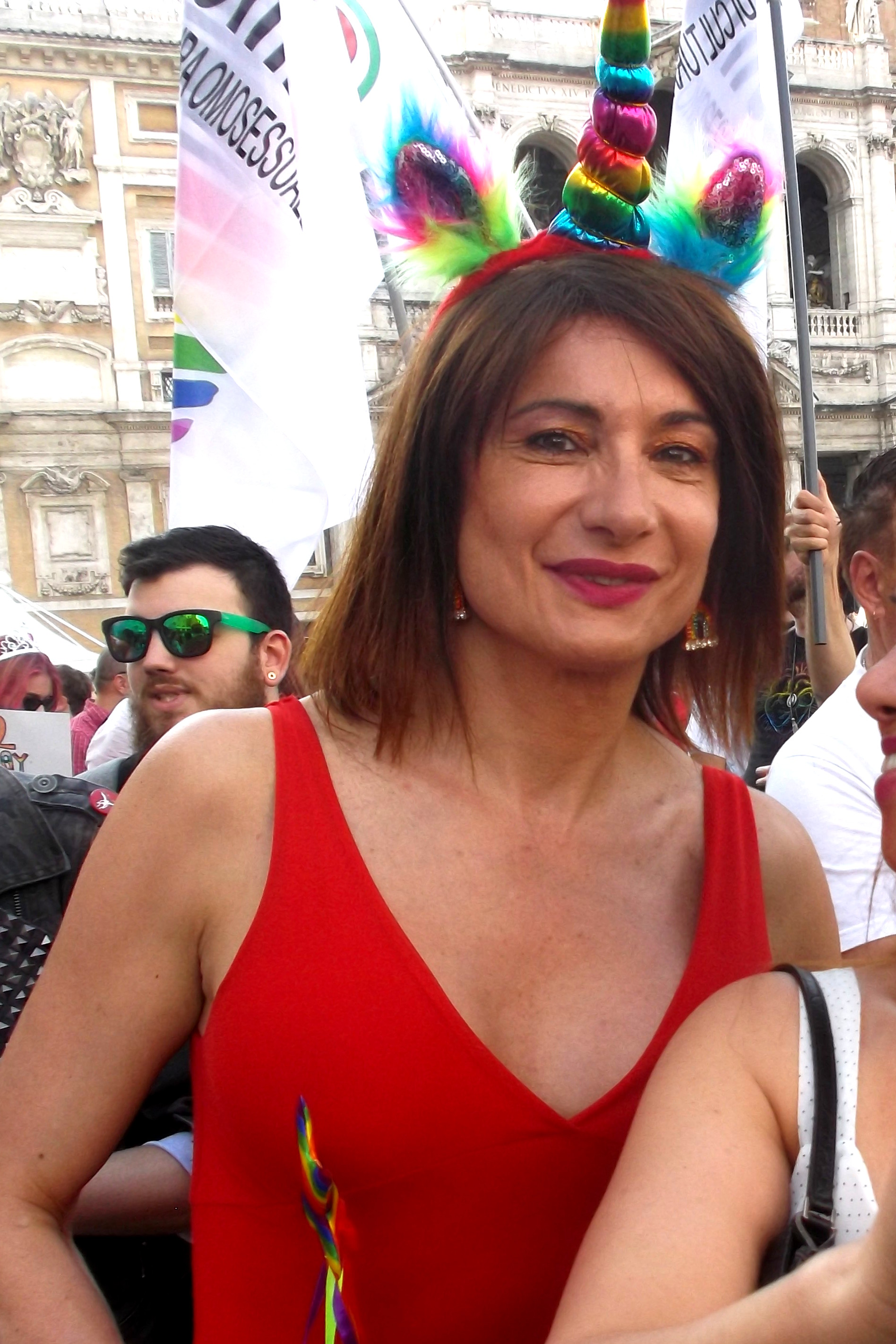
- Luxuria at the 2019 Roma Pride

Member of the Italian Chamber of Deputies
- In office 28 April 2006 – 28 April 2008
- Constituency: Lazio

Personal details
- Born: 24 June 1965 (age 60) Foggia, Apulia, Italy
- Party: Communist Refoundation Party
- Education: Sapienza University of Rome
- Profession: LGBTQ+ activist; politician; author; television personality; actress; playwright

Vladimir Luxuria (Italian: [ˈvlaːdimir luˈksuːrja]; born 24 June 1965) is an Italian activist, television personality and actress. Luxuria was a Communist Refoundation Party MP, belonging to The Union coalition led by Romano Prodi.

She was the first openly transgender member of Parliament in Europe, and the world's second openly transgender MP after New Zealander Georgina Beyer. She lost her seat in the election of April 2008.

In the 2006 general election, Luxuria was elected to the Chamber of Deputies by the Lazio 1 constituency in Rome. She lost her seat in the 2008 election. After the retirement of Beyer and Luxuria, there were no transgender MPs reported in the world, until 2011, when Anna Grodzka was elected to the Polish parliament.

== Biography ==
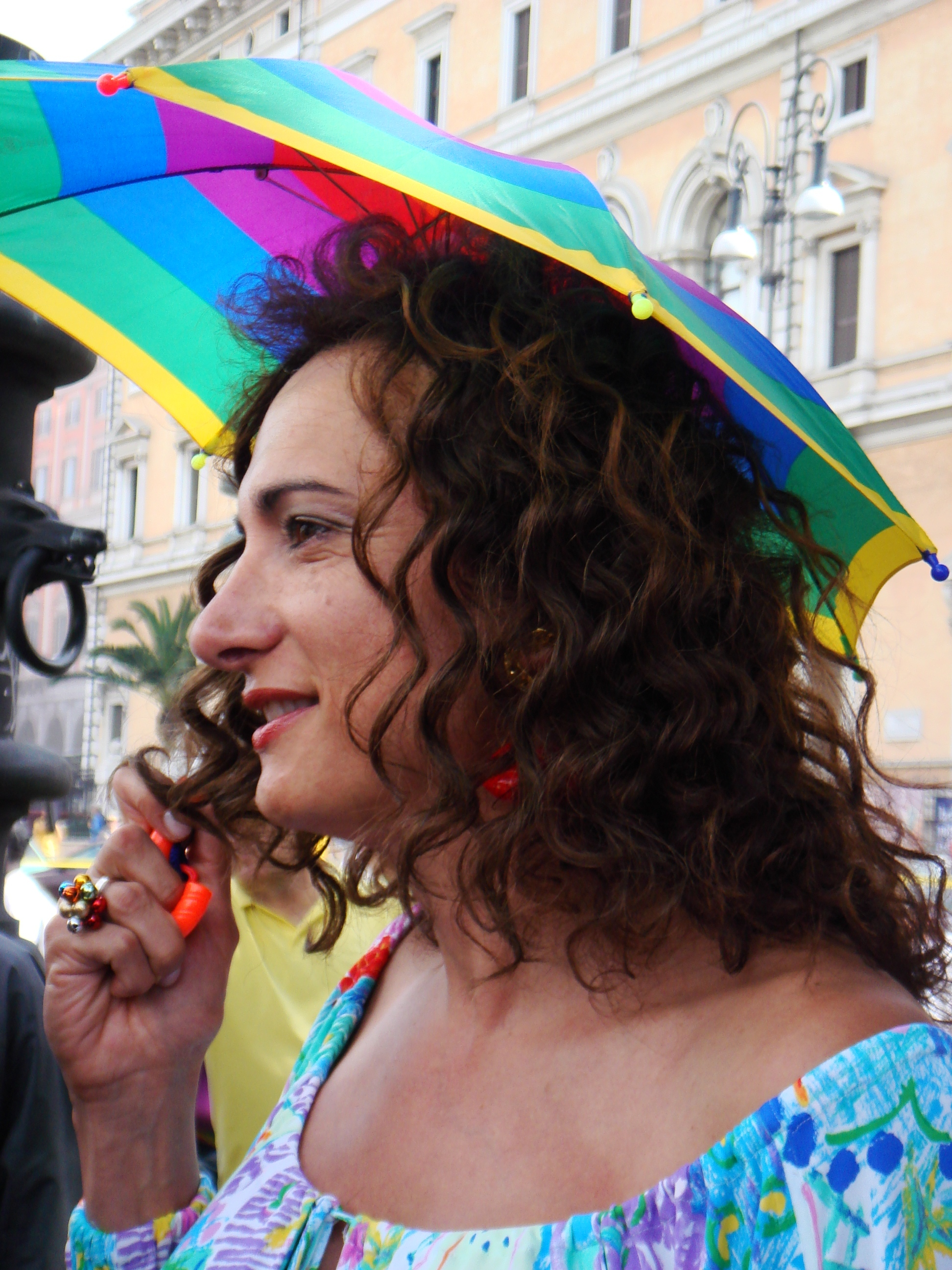
Luxuria at Roma Gay Pride 2008

Born in Foggia, Apulia, Luxuria moved to Rome in 1985 to study foreign languages and literature. She also began to act, notably in cabaret, and through this developed her gender ambiguity as a hallmark. Her assumed surname, Luxuria, means lust in Latin. She earned her first acting credit in Cena alle nove by Paolo Breccia in 1991; and began organizing parties and gay pride events, becoming director of the Muccassassina, the self-financing party of the Circle of homosexual culture Mario Mieli. She graduated in foreign languages and literatures at University of Rome La Sapienza with a master thesis on Joseph Conrad.

She organized Italy's first pride festival, in Rome on 2 June 1994, which attracted some ten thousand people. From 2001 to 2003 she toured Italian theatres with the musical Emotions co-starring with Sabrina Salerno and Ambra Angiolini.

Her career as a performer was not restricted to stage shows, and in 2005 she hosted a television show about nostalgia for 1980s music and culture on All Music. She also became well known for participating in charity organizations before making the transition to politics.

Luxuria identifies using the English word "transgender" and prefers feminine pronouns, titles, and adjectives. Upon entering parliament, she made the decision to stop wearing her trademark drag clothing – an extravagant cocktail of sequins, feather boas and bouffant wigs – saying that the legislature was "not a discothèque" and that, "It wouldn't be useful to provoke [people] in such a stupid way".

After her bid for re-election failed in April 2008, Luxuria appeared on L'Isola dei Famosi, which has been described as "Italy's celebrity answer to Survivor". The show, which saw her pip Argentine model and showgirl Belen Rodriguez (former girlfriend of Italy footballer Marco Borriello) to first place in a public poll, took place in Honduras. Luxuria said of her victory that "The Italian public has shown itself to be more forward-looking than our politicians, who thought I would turn up in parliament dressed like (former porn-star politician) Cicciolina". Pledging to donate half of her €200,000 prize money to charity, Luxuria chose UNICEF, saying "I know that I won't have children and I want to help disadvantaged children in my own way".

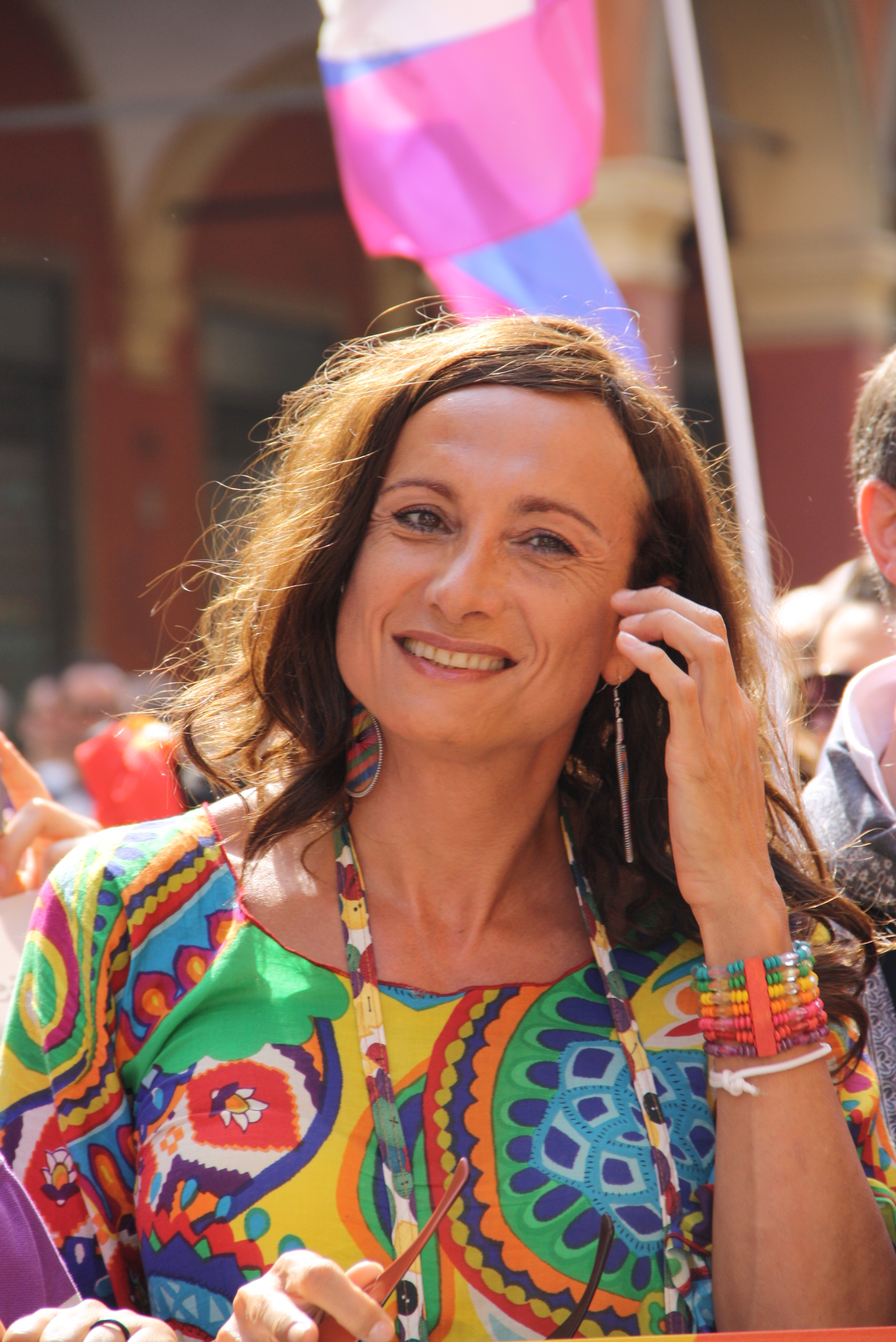
Luxuria at Bologna Gay Pride 2012

She was chosen to host the 2012 edition of the Italian TV program L'Isola dei Famosi, on RaiDue.

In 2017, in an interview with Mauro Leonardi for an Italian weekly (Novella 2000), told for the first time her conversion to Catholicism. The interview has aroused media hype and, during a broadcast on Rai 1, she reiterated the content of her statements, as well as in an interview in 2022.

== Political life ==
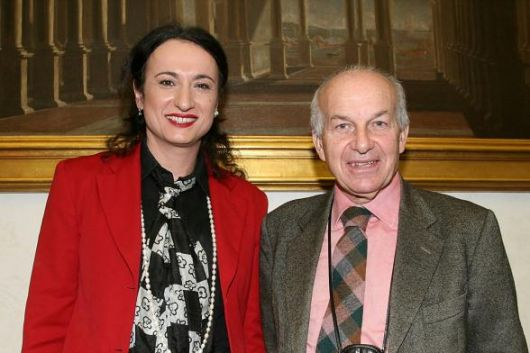
The Honourable Luxuria with President of the Chamber of Deputies Fausto Bertinotti in 2006

=== Election in 2006 ===
Although her Lazio 1 constituency was seen as a safe Communist seat, her election was not without difficulties, particularly after it was disclosed that she had been a sex worker for a time shortly after arriving in Rome due to the difficulty of finding a conventional job as a transgender individual. Clemente Mastella, the leader of the centrist UDEUR party (a fellow member of the coalition) called her "a ridiculous Cicciolina". Alessandra Mussolini, said, referring to Luxuria, that it was "better to be a fascist than a faggot" (meglio fascista che frocio). However, Luxuria's name was placed second on the list of Communist candidates for Lazio, after party leader Fausto Bertinotti, which increased her chances of being elected (Italy uses a system of proportional representation).

During the election, she and another candidate were attacked by a group of fifteen people, allegedly including National Alliance politicians; they pelted her with fennel (in Italian finocchio, a word also meaning "faggot"). The politicians in question were suspended by AN; Luxuria criticized the police for the time it took for them to respond to the incident.

=== Service ===
Her service in the Italian parliament got off to a rocky start, when in October 2006 Forza Italia MP Elisabetta Gardini insisted that she should not be allowed to use women's washrooms in the parliament building and called for the creation of a third washroom. Gardini described finding Luxuria presence there as a "sexual violence"; and later faced condemnations from coalition deputies for displaying prejudice tantamount to racism. Luxuria declared that she had used the toilets for years and that using the male lavatory would engender even greater problems.

In the 2008 election, the Refoundation Communist Party joined a coalition of left-wing parties known as the Rainbow Left. However, this group gained only 3.2% of the vote and lost all of its seats in parliament. Silvio Berlusconi's centre-right coalition swept to victory. Luxuria was not re-elected. Paolo Ferrero, then leader of the Communist Refoundation Party, said that he would be open to the idea of her returning to politics as a nominee for the 2009 European Parliament election after her win on L'Isola dei Famosi, but Luxuria said that she had no plans to re-enter politics.

=== Gay rights ===
Luxuria has long been a strong advocate for gay rights and a participant in events promoting equality for homosexuals. She helped organize Italy's first gay pride festival in 1994 and continued her activism throughout her tenure as a politician; in May 2007, she took part in the second Muscovite gay pride parade.

She used her prominence in Italian politics once elected as a platform for advocating gay rights. In the lead-up to her election, Luxuria made gay rights an issue of her campaign and felt herself to be a representative of the LGBT community, saying, "We don't want privileges – we want our rights". In addition, Luxuria called for civil unions to be enabled for gay couples and for Italy to accommodate political asylum for "all gays who try to get into Italy from countries where homosexuality is punishable by death".

Luxuria also campaigned prior to the elections for gays to have cohabitation rights, and had helped the campaign by winning the support of Italy's left. Furthermore, Luxuria outlined her long-term support for full gay marriage rights, comparable with Spain's implementation of the law. In September 2006, she stated that the Vatican's ongoing influence in politics, specifically in regards to gay marriage, contravened clauses of the Italian Constitution. Luxuria reacted to Pope Benedict XVI's end-of-year speech in 2008, when he compared protecting the environment with saving humanity from a "blurring of gender" (homosexual or transsexual behaviour), by saying that such comments were "hurtful".

== Filmography ==
=== Films ===
Year	Title	Role	Notes
1991	Cena alle nove	Trans woman	Cameo appearance
1996	Come mi vuoi	Drag queen	Cameo appearance
1997	We All Fall Down	Prostitute	
1999	La vespa e la regina	Trans woman	Cameo appearance
1999	Guardami	Quinn	
2000	Sono positivo	Herself	Cameo appearance
2001	Ogni lasciato è perso	Party guest	Cameo appearance
2005	Mother Nature	Massimino	
2006	L'eletta	Herself	Documentary film
2024	Emilia Pérez	Emilia Pérez / Juan "Manitas" Del Monte (voice)	Italian dubbed version of the film

=== Television ===
Year	Title	Role	Notes
1995–2005	Maurizio Costanzo Show	Herself – Recurring guest	Talk show
2000	Tequila & Bonetti	Trans woman	Episode: "Il ladro"
2004	Con le unghie e con i denti	Vladi	Television film
2004–2008	Markette – Tutto fa brodo in TV	Herself – Recurring guest	Variety/talk show
2008	L'Isola dei Famosi	Herself – Contestant	Reality show (season 6)
2012–2013	Fuori di gusto	Herself – Host	Cooking program
2013–2014	Quelli che... il Calcio	Herself – Reporter	Sports/comedy program (season 21)
2014	Grande Fratello	Herself – Recurring guest	Reality show (season 13)
2015	Miss Italia	Herself – Judge	Annual beauty contest
2015	L'isola di Adamo ed Eva	Herself – Host	Reality show
2017	L'Isola dei Famosi	Herself – Recurring guest	Reality show (season 12)
2017–2021	Domenica Live	Herself – Recurring guest	Talk show (seasons 6–9)
2017–present	Pomeriggio Cinque	Herself – Recurring guest	Talk show (seasons 10–present)
2018	Tale e quale show	Herself – Contestant	Talent show (season 8)
2019–2021	Live – Non è la D'Urso	Herself – Recurring guest	Talk show
2020	Lampadino e Caramella nel Magiregno degli Zampa	Raffa Giraffa (voice)	Main role
2021	Le Iene	Herself – Reporter	Information program (season 25)
2021	Drag Race Italia	Herself – Guest judge	Talent show (season 1)
2022	Back to School	Herself – Contestant	Reality show (season 1)
2022	Il cantante mascherato	Herself – Contestant	Talent show (season 3)
2022	L'isola dei famosi	Herself – Opinionist	Reality show (season 16)
2024	L'isola dei famosi	Herself – Host	Reality show (season 18)
2025	Helluva Boss	Sallie May (voice)	Italian dubbed version

== Theater ==
- Emozioni (2001–2003)
- Che fine ha fatto Cenerentola? (2003)
- One Drag Show (2003)
- Male di Luna (2004)
- My name is Silvia (2005)
- Persone naturali e strafottenti (2010)
- La donna uomo (2010)
- Morning has broken - Una vita spezzata (2010)
- Si sdrai perfavore (2011–2012)

== Bibliography ==
- Chi ha paura della muccassassina? Il mio mondo in discoteca e viceversa, Bompiani, 2007
- Le favole non dette, Bompiani, 2009
- Eldorado, Bompiani, 2011
- L'Italia migliore, Bompiani, 2013

== Discography ==
- Der Traurige, in Hey Roma! (Klang Records - klg 003 - 1989)
