= Simona Ventura =

Italian television presenter (born 1965)

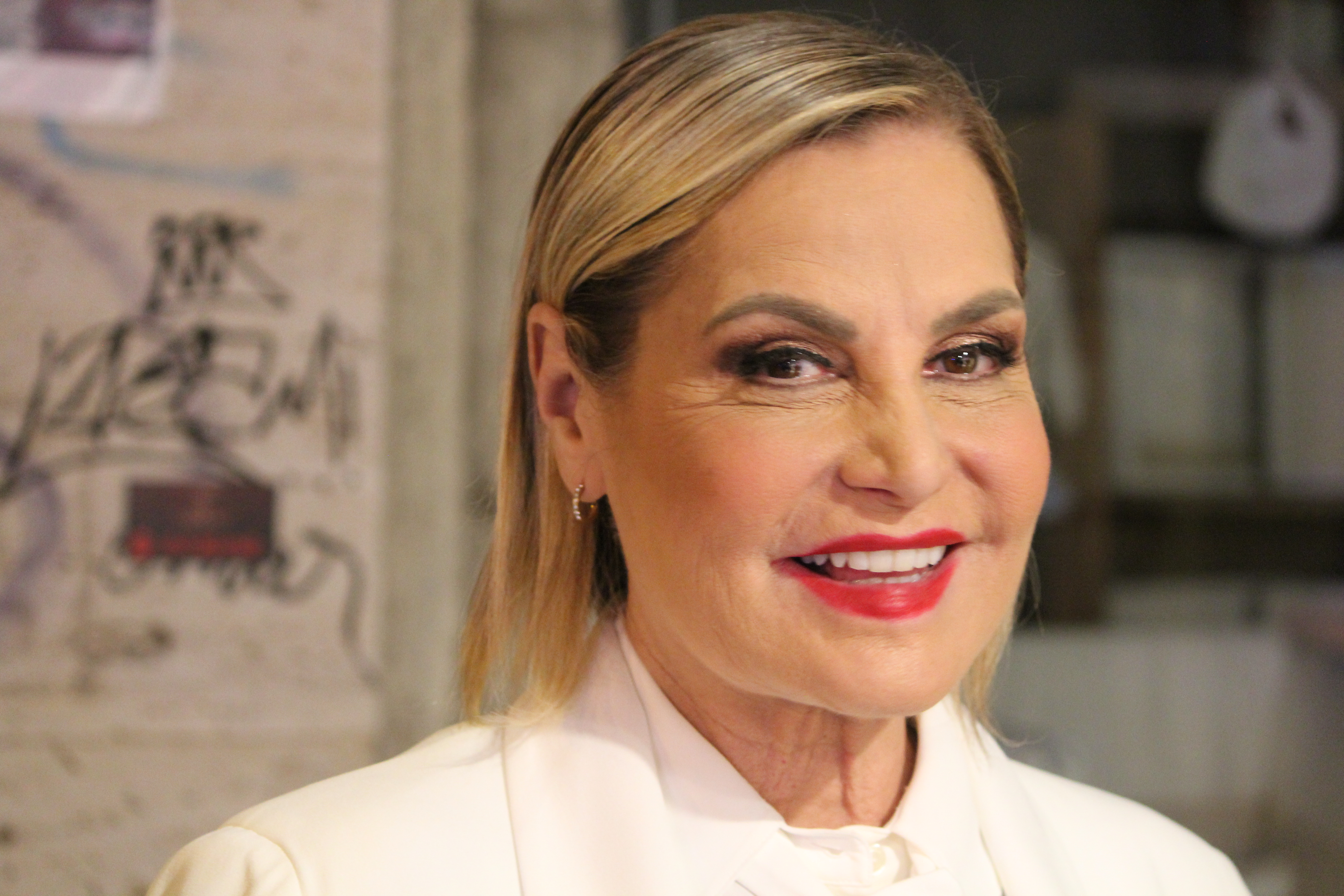
- Ventura in 2026
- Born: 1 April 1965 (age 61); Bentivoglio, Emilia-Romagna, Italy
- Occupations: Television presenter; beauty pageant titleholder
- Known for: Quelli che... il Calcio

Simona Ventura (born 1 April 1965) is an Italian actress, TV host and beauty pageant titleholder. The leading TV host of Rai 2, she is the third woman to have presented the Sanremo Music Festival, after Loretta Goggi and Raffaella Carrà and before Antonella Clerici.

== Television career ==
Ventura was born in Bentivoglio, Emilia-Romagna, but grew up in Chivasso, Piedmont. She started in TV on Domani sposi with Giancarlo Magalli on Rai Uno. Her love for sport took her into sports reporting: for the Italian Telemontecarlo she was the correspondent during the 1990 FIFA World Cup, UEFA Euro 1992 and the 1992 Summer Olympics.

At RAI, Ventura appeared with Pippo Baudo on the Sunday afternoon programme Domenica in (1991) and then, in 1992, the sports programme La domenica sportiva. She has also been on Pavarotti International.

Ventura's career continued on Mediaset channels hosting variety shows like Mai dire gol, Cuori e Denari, Boom, Scherzi a parte (a programme very similar to Punk'd), Festivalbar, Le Iene, Matricole, Gli indelebili '99, cari amici miei, Zelig - Noi facciamo cabaret, and Piccole canaglie. In all, she spent eight years at Mediaset.

In 1996, Ventura hosted the newcomers' section of the Sanremo Music Festival for RAI.

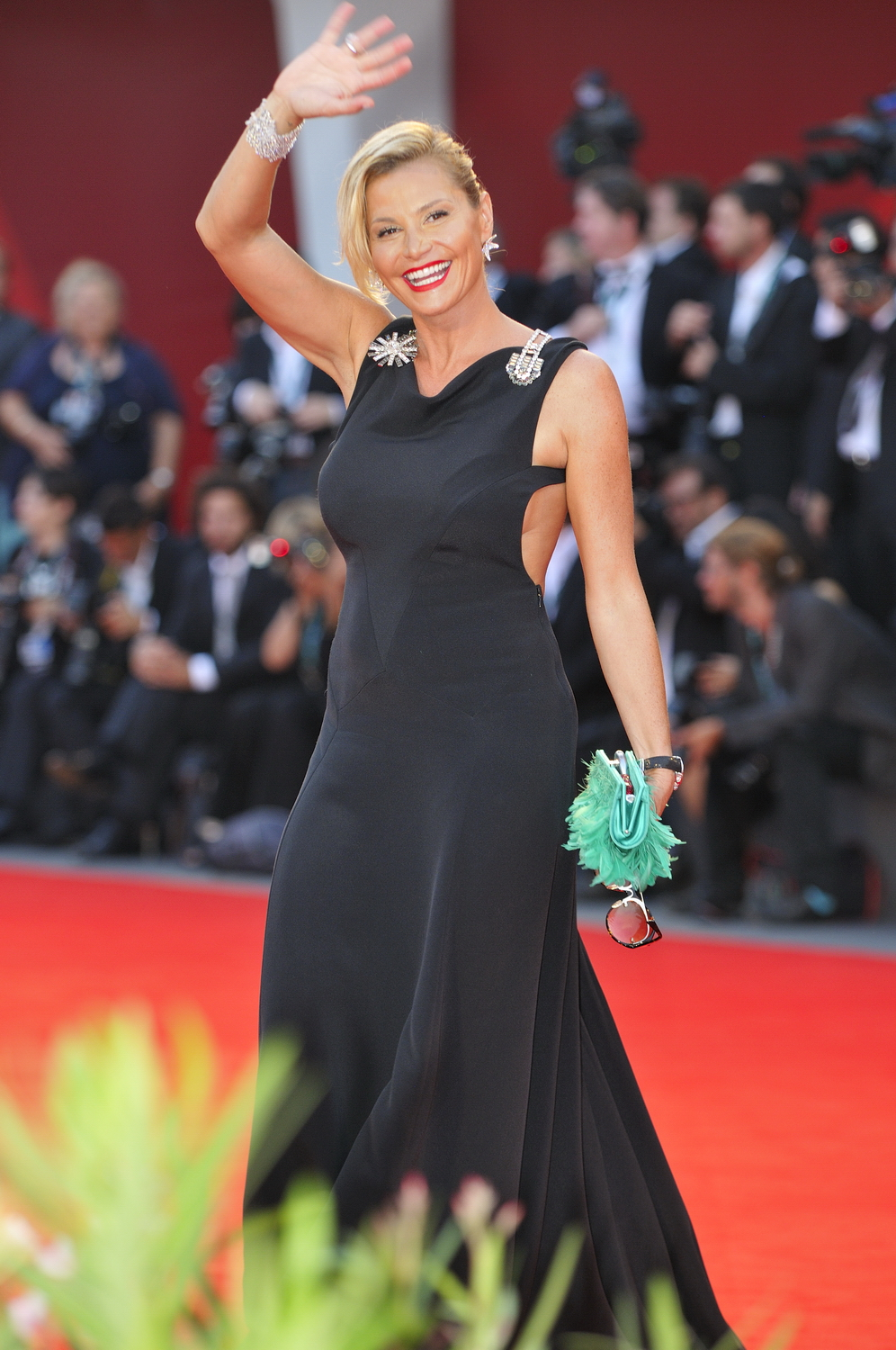
Simona Ventura in 2009

In 2001 Simona went back to Rai Due to host the seventh edition of the Sunday afternoon show "Quelli che il calcio" and a prime-time show called "Quelli che lo smoking". In 2002 Pippo Baudo chose her for the "Dopofestival" (a variety show about the Sanremo Music Festival) and she then presented a late night television show with Gene Gnocchi called "La grande notte del lunedì sera". She has been presenting the Italian version of Celebrity Survivor, L'isola dei famosi, since 2003. In 2004 she was the host presenter of the Sanremo Music Festival. In 2005 and 2006 she presented Music Farm, a show similar to the Hit Me, Baby, One More Time format, on Rai Due.

She also had the Prime Time Access Rule on Rai Uno with Le tre scimmiette and in 2007 appeared in prime time with Colpo di genio.

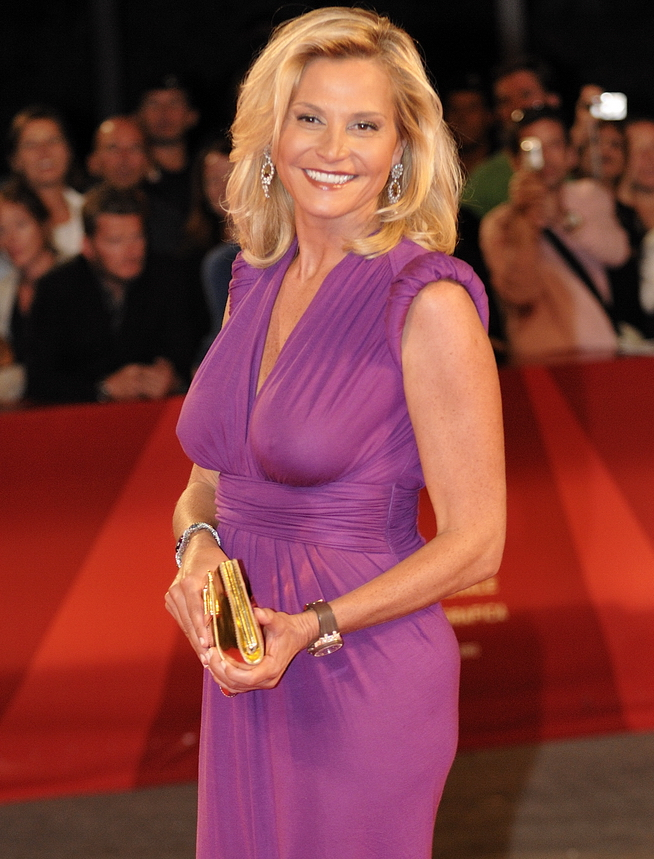
Ventura on the red carpet of the 66th Venice Film Festival, 2009

Simona Ventura presented Quelli che... il Calcio until 2011. She led the popular reality show L'isola dei famosi for 8 editions. In the fall of 2009, she abandoned her role as a judge on X-Factor. Working on his two most important programmes, Simona Ventura in May 2011 had some problems with the company. The director of RAI 2 Massimo Liofredi tried not to renew the contract of Simona Ventura for this reason after she signed a contract with Sky.

Simona was a judge in seasons 1, 2, 5, 6 and 7 of the Italian X-Factor, winning the fifth one with her act Francesca Michielin.

Simona Ventura signed a contract for two years with satellite platform Sky after almost 10 years spent working at RAI bringing good advertising revenue, becoming the queen of RAI 2, leaving the company to move to the satellite network.

In early 2016 Simona Ventura returned to Mediaset as a contestant in the XI season of the popular reality show L'isola dei famosi now hosted by Alessia Marcuzzi with Alvin on Canale 5 and won by Giacobbe Fragomeni.

In the autumn of 2016 Mariano Di Vaio (in couple with the dancer Stefano De Martino) is one of the tutors/mentors of the first season of Selfie – Le cose cambiano, the new talent show produced by Fascino PGT of Maria De Filippi and aired by Canale 5 with Simona Ventura as presenter. Bernardo Corradi (in couple with the dancer Stefano De Martino) in May-June 2017 is one of the tutors/mentors in the second season of Selfie – Le cose cambiano, a talent show produced by Fascino PGT of Maria De Filippi and aired by Canale 5 with Simona Ventura as presenter.

== Other appearances ==
In 1996 Ventura was the Italian voice of Lola Bunny in Space Jam.

She acted in the film Fratelli Coltelli in 1997.

In 2008 Ventura starred in La fidanzata di papà with Massimo Boldi and Elisabetta Canalis.

In 2009 Ventura was trolled by English rock band Muse in her show Quelli che.. il Calcio.

In 2010 she had a cameo in Sofia Coppola's Somewhere.

In 2012, Ventura provided the voice of the pre-match presenter in the EA Sports video game FIFA 13.

== Awards ==
Ventura has won 4 Telegatti as Best Female Figure of the Year.

== Filmography ==
Film
Year	Title	Role(s)	Notes
1988	Una notte, un sogno	Young girl	Uncredited extra
1989	Le finte bionde	Blonde girl	Uncredited extra
1996	Space Jam	Lola Bunny	Voice role (Italian dub)
1997	Fratelli coltelli	Sonia	
2008	La fidanzata di papà	Angela Vandelli	
2009	Videocracy	Herself	Documentary
2010	Somewhere	Telegatto Host	Cameo appearance
2011	Vacanze di Natale a Cortina	Herself	Cameo appearance
2021	Le 7 giornate di Bergamo	None	Director only
2022	Marco inedito	None	Director only

== Television ==
Television programmes
Year	Title	Role(s)	Notes
1986	Miss Italia 1986	Contestant	Annual beauty contest
1988	Miss Universe 1988	Contestant	Annual beauty contest
1988–1989	Domani sposi	Co-host	Game show
1990–1991	Galagoal	Reporter	Sports talk show
1991–1992	Domenica in	Reporter	Talk show (season 16)
1992–1994	La Domenica Sportiva	Co-host	Sports talk show
1994	Scommetiamo che…?	Reporter	Variety show
1994	Castrocaro Music Festival 1994	Host	Annual music festival
1994–1997	Mai dire Gol	Host	Sports program (season 5-7)
1995, 1999	Scherzi a parte	Co-host	Prank show (seasons 4, 6)
1996	Sanremo Giovani	Co-host	Talent show (season 4)
1996	Il boom	Co-host	Variety show
1997	Festivalbar 1997	Co-host	Annual music festival
1997–2001, 2016	Le Iene	Host	Information program (seasons 1-4, 19)
1998–2001	Matricole	Host	Docuseries
1998–1999	Zelig	Host	Variety show (season 2-3)
2001	Piccole canaglie	Host	Variety show
2001–2011	Quelli che... il Calcio	Host	Sports program (season 9-18)
2002	DopoFestival	Host	Sanremo Music Festival aftershow
2003–2011	L'isola dei famosi	Host	Reality show (season 1-8)
2004	Sanremo Music Festival 2004	Host	Annual music festival
2005–2006	Music Farm	Host	Talent show (season 2-3)
2008–2011	X Factor	Judge	Talent show (season 1-2, 5-7)
2012–2013	Cielo che Gol	Host	Sports talk show
2014–2015	Miss Italia	Host	Annual beauty contest
2015	Notti sul ghiacchio	Judge	Talent show (season 3)
2016–2017	Selfie - Le cose cambiano	Host	Reality show
2018	Amici di Maria De Filippi	Judge	Talent show (season 17 final stage)
2018	Temptation Island VIP	Host	Reality show (season 1)
2019	Il collegio	Narrator	Reality show (season 4)
2019	The Voice of Italy	Host	Talent show (season 6)
2021	Game of Games: Gioco loco	Host	Game show
2022	Ultima fermata	Host	Reality show
2023	Il cantante mascherato	Contestant	Talent show (season 4)
2023	Ballando con le Stelle	Contestant	Talent show (season 18)
2025	Grande Fratello	Host	Reality show (season 19)
2026	RIP: Roast in Peace	Roastee	Comedy show (season 2)

== Personal life ==
Ventura was married to Italian footballer and television personality Stefano Bettarini between 1998 and 2004; they have two children together. Ventura is Catholic.
