= Paola Di Benedetto =

Italian model and presenter (born 1995)

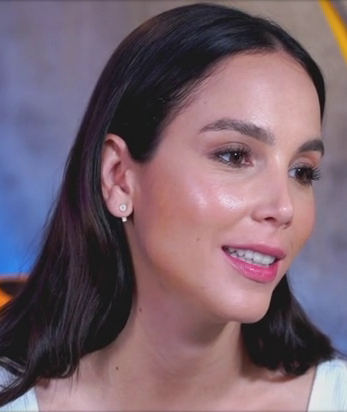
- Paola Di Benedetto in 2023
- Born: Paola Di Benedetto; 8 January 1995 (age 31); Vicenza, Veneto, Italy
- Occupations: Television presenter; radio personality; model
- Height: 1.73 m (5 ft 8.11 in)
- Partner(s): Matteo Gentili (2014–2018); Francesco Monte (2018); Federico Rossi (2018–2021); Rkomi (2022); Raoul Bellanova (2023–present)
- Website: Paola Di Benedetto

Paola Di Benedetto (born 8 January 1995) is an Italian television and radio personality, and model.

== Biography ==
Paola Di Benedetto was born on January 8, 1995, in Vicenza, from mother Antonella and father Nino Di Benedetto, both of Sicilian origins. She was born with her brother Giovanni from a twin birth.

== Career ==
Paola Di Benedetto she graduated from the technical economic institute. During her adolescence she participates in some beauty contests. She ranks second to Miss Veneto, she wins the title of Miss Grand Prix 3 and Miss Antenna 3 and is among the finalists of Miss Vicenza by winning the title of Miss Model Girl. She works as a model, valet, presenter and meteorina in the programs of the local TVA Vicenza how: Sportivamente Domenica (2012) e Diretta Biancorossa (2014–2015).

Later in 2015 he participated in the video clips Sei bellissima and La mia cameretta, both video clips by Luca Bretta. The following year, in 2016, he participated in the Bomber video clip of Il Pagante.

In 2016 she participates in the Miss Italia selections; she then she starts working for national television: she is the character of Mother Nature in the third last episode of Ciao Darwin 7 - La resurrezione broadcast on Canale 5 with the conduction of Paolo Bonolis and Luca Laurenti and, subsequently, she joins the cast of Colorado dancers where she is elected Miss Colorado. Also in 2016 he participated in the advertising spot for TIM. The following year, in 2017, he participated as a regular commentator in the Casa Chi program, broadcast on the 361TV platform.

In 2018 she participates in the thirteenth edition of L'isola dei famosi on Canale 5, conducted by Alessia Marcuzzi. She will be provisionally eliminated in the sixth week and definitively in the following one, finishing thirteenth out of twenty competitors. In the same year he participated in the program Tiki Taka - Il calcio è il nostro gioco, broadcast on Italia 1 with the conduction of Pierluigi Pardo.

Between November 2018 and January 2019 she is one of the commentators of the Mai Dire Talk program on Italia 1 hosted by Mago Forest and Gialappa's Band. In 2019 he participated as a columnist in the talk shows Mattino Cinque, Pomeriggio Cinque and Domenica Live. In the same year she was a victim of the Italia 1 Le Iene program.

From 8 January to 8 April 2020 he took part in the fourth edition of Grande Fratello VIP, led by Alfonso Signorini, coming out the winner with 56% of the preferences against Paolo Ciavarro, deciding to donate the entire prize money of 100.000 euros to charity to Mediafriends to support the fight against COVID-19 and not only half as required by the regulation. With this victory she is the eighth woman to win an edition of the Grande Fratello format and the second woman to win an edition of the VIP version of the reality show.

In autumn 2020 he hosted the Disconnessi On the Road, together with Paolo Ciavarro and Giulia Salemi, broadcast in the late evening on Italia 1. On 10 November 2020, she publishes her first book published by Mondadori Rizzoli, Se ci credi. Ci vogliono testa e cuore. In the same year he participated as a competitor in the program Giù in 60 secondi - Adrenalina ad alta quota. Always 2020 he participated in the program E poi c'è Cattelan, broadcast on Sky Uno with the conduct of Alessandro Cattelan.

From 2020 she starts working as a radio host for radios such as RTL 102.5 and Radio Zeta. In 2021 she was the victim of the Scherzi a parte program, broadcast on Canale 5 with the conduct of Enrico Papi. In 2021 and 2022 she hosted Hot Factor and Ante Factor, both spin-offs of X Factor broadcast on Sky Uno and TV8. In the same years she hosted RTL 102.5 Power Hits Estate.

In 2022 he conducted on Rai 1 together with Roberta Capua and Ciro Priello PrimaFestival, spin-off of the Sanremo Music Festival. In the same year he participated as a competitor in the game show Soliti ignoti - Il ritorno, broadcast on Rai 1 with the conduction of Amadeus and took part in the Acqua Vitasnella commercial. In 2022 he hosts together with Jody Cecchetto and Camilla Ghini Radio Zeta Future Hits Live, broadcast on TV8 and RTL 102.5 TV. On January 31, 2023 he participated as a competitor in the Millennials team together with Emanuel Caserio, Alessandro Egger and Soleil Sorge in the Boomerissima program, broadcast on Rai 2 with the conduction of Alessia Marcuzzi. In the same year he took part in the music video Come vuoi by Geolier.

== Personal life ==
Paola Di Benedetto from 2014 to 2018 had relationship with the footballer Matteo Gentili.

In 2018 he had a relationship of a few months with Francesco Monte, known during his participation in the thirteenth edition of L'isola dei famosi.

From June 2018 to June 2021 she was romantically linked to the singer Federico Rossi of the musical duo Benji & Fede.

In 2022 she was in a short relationship with rapper Rkomi.

== Television programs ==
Year	Title	Network		Role
2012	Miss Vicenza	TVA Vicenza		Herself / Contestant
2012	Miss Antenna Tre	TVA Vicenza		Herself / Contestant
2012	Sportivamente Domenica	TVA Vicenza		Co-host
2014-2015	Diretta Biancorossa	TVA Vicenza		Conductor
2016	Ciao Darwin 7 - La resurrezione	Canale 5		Mother Nature
2017-2018	Colorado	Italia 1		Herself
2018	L'isola dei famosi 13	Canale 5		Herself / Contestant
2019	Mattino Cinque	Canale 5		Opinionist
2019	Pomeriggio Cinque	Canale 5		Opinionist
2019	Domenica Live	Canale 5		Opinionist
2019	Le Iene	Italia 1		Victim
2018-2019	Mai Dire Talk	Italia 1		Opinionist
2020	Grande Fratello VIP 4	Canale 5		Contestant / Winner
2020	Disconnessi On the Road	Italia 1		Co-host
2020	Giù in 60 secondi - Adrenalina ad alta quota	Italia 1		Herself / Contestant
2020	E poi c'è Cattelan	Sky Uno		Guest star
2021	Scherzi a parte	Canale 5		Victim
2021-2022	Hot Factor	Sky Uno	TV8	Conductor
2021-2022	Ante Factor	Sky Uno	TV8	Conductor
2021-2022	RTL 102.5 Power Hits Estate	TV8		Conductor
2022	Soliti ignoti - Il ritorno	Rai 1		Herself / Contestant
2022	PrimaFestival	Rai 1		Co-host
2022	Radio Zeta Future Hits Live	TV8	RTL 102.5 TV	Conductor
2023	Boomerissima	Rai 2		Herself / Contestant

== Web TV ==
Year	Title	Platform	Role
2017	Casa Chi	361TV	Opinionist

== Radio ==
Year	Title	Canal
2020–present	Generazione Zeta	Radio Zeta
2020–present	Miseria e nobiltà week-end	RTL 102.5
2021–present	The Flight	RTL 102.5

== Filmography ==
=== Videoclip ===
Year	Title	Artist
2015	"Sei bellissima"	Luca Bretta
2016	"La mia cameretta"	Luca Bretta
2016	"Bomber"	Il Pagante
2023	"Come vuoi"	Geolier

== Advertising campaigns ==
Year	Title
2016	TIM
2022-2023	Acqua Vitasnella

== Works ==
- Di Benedetto, Paola (2020). Se ci credi. Ci vogliono testa e cuore (in Italian). Rizzoli. ISBN 9788817154185.
