= L'isola dei famosi season 13 =

L'isola dei famosi
- Season 13
- Presented by: Alessia Marcuzzi (in the studio); Stefano De Martino (from the island)
- No. of days: 85
- No. of castaways: 20
- Winner: Nino "Gaspare" Formicola
- Runner-up: Bianca Atzei
- Location: Cayos Cochinos, Honduras
- No. of episodes: 13

Release
- Original network: Canale 5
- Original release: January 22 – April 16, 2018

Season chronology
- ← Previous; Season 12 Next → Season 14

L'isola dei famosi 13 is the thirteenth season of the reality television L'isola dei famosi and the Italian version of the reality show franchise Survivor, aired in prime time on Canale 5 from 22 January to 16 April 2018. It was the fourth edition broadcast by Mediaset, hosted by Alessia Marcuzzi for the fourth consecutive year, flanked in the studio by commentators Mara Venier and Daniele Bossari and from Gialappa's Band in connection, and with the participation of the correspondent Stefano De Martino. It lasted 85 days, had 20 castaways and 13 episodes and was held in Cayos Cochinos (Honduras). The motto of this edition was Mossa di potere.

The stories of the castaways were broadcast by Canale 5 in prime time with variations on Monday evenings (episodes 1-3, 7-8, 12-13) and Tuesday evenings (episodes 4-6, 9-11), while the daily strips in the day-time was entrusted to Canale 5 (from Monday to Friday) and Italia 1 (everyday). Furthermore, the day-time was broadcast on La5 and Mediaset Extra with the addition of unpublished material with the title of L'isola dei famosi - Extended Edition, the duration of which varied from 175 to 180 minutes.

The edition ended with the victory of Nino Formicola, known as Gaspare, who was awarded the prize money of €100,000.

== Contestants ==
The age of the contestants refers to the time of landing on the island.

Contestant	Age	Profession	Birthplace	Day entered	Day exited	Status
Nino "Gaspare" Formicola	64	Comedian, actor	Milan	1	85	Winner
Bianca Atzei	30	Songwriter	Milan	1	85	Runner-up
Amaurys Pérez	41	Water polo player	Camagüey, Cuba	1	85	3rd Place
Francesca Cipriani	33	Showgirl, TV personality	Popoli	1	85	4th Place
Jonathan Kashanian	37	TV personality	Ramat Gan, Israel	1	85	5th Place
Rosa Perrotta	28	Model, TV personality	Pagani, Campania	1	78	10th Eliminated
Alessia Mancini	39	TV presenter, showgirl, actress	Marino, Lazio	1	78	9th Eliminated
Elena Morali	28	Showgirl, TV personality	Ponte San Pietro	8	72	8th Eliminated
Franco Terlizzi	55	Personal trainer, former boxer	Bitonto	1	68	Walked
Simone Barbato	38	Comedian, mime	Ovada	8	65	7th Eliminated
Marco Ferri	29	Model	Lodi, Lombardy	1	58	6th Eliminated
Nadia Rinaldi	50	Actress	Rome	1	50	5th Eliminated
Paola Di Benedetto	23	Model, showgirl, TV personality	Vicenza	1	43	4th Eliminated
Filippo Nardi	48	Disc jockey, TV presenter, TV personality	London, England	1	43	3rd Eliminated
Cecilia Capriotti	41	Showgirl, actress, former model	Ascoli Piceno	1	43	2nd Eliminated
Giucas Casella	68	Illusionist, TV personality	Termini Imerese	1	37	Walked
Craig Warwick	66	Psychic	London, England	1	23	Walked
Francesco Monte	29	Model, TV personality	Taranto	1	14	Walked
Éva Henger	45	Showgirl, former pornographic actress	Győr, Hungary	1	8	1st Eliminated
Chiara Nasti	20	Model, fashion blogger	Naples	1	7	Walked

=== Saranno Isolani ===
Contestant	Age	Profession	Birthplace	Status
Franco Terlizzi	56	Personal trainer, former boxer	Bitonto	Winner
Deianira Marzano	38	Social blogger, housewife	Naples	Finalist
Valerio Schiavone	40	Teacher, monologist, director	Taranto	Finalist
Asia Valente	21	Model, influencer	Benevento	Eliminated
Anna Adornato	31	Writer	Rizziconi	Eliminated
Federico Dolce	32	Model	Catanzaro	Eliminated
Francesco Balacco	20	Blogger	Molfetta	Eliminated
Barbara Bertanza	40	Herbalist	Verona	Eliminated
Roberto Caldara	39	Lawyer	Rome	Eliminated

=== Guest star ===
Name	Age	Profession	Birthplace	Duration
Valeria Marini	51	Showgirl, actress	Rome	Day 58 - 61

=== Guests in Honduras ===
Name	Age	Profession	Birthplace	Duration
Flavio Montrucchio	43	Actor, TV presenter	Turin	Day 47
Riccardo Ferri	55	Former footballer	Crema, Lombardy	Day 54

== Nominations table ==
Legend

Leader: he/she is immune or completely exempt from nominations and can automatically send a contestant to the public vote
The contestant is immune

	Week 1	Week 2	Week 3	Week 4	Week 5	Week 6		Week 7	Week 8	Week 9	Week 10	Week 11	Week 12	Week 13 Final			Nominations received
Leader	Francesco	Alessia	Paola	Marco	Simone	Marco		Jonathan	Amaurys	Alessia		none					Nominations received
Gaspare	Marco	Francesca	Elena	Elena	Paola	Elena	No; Nominations	Rosa	Simone	Francesca	Francesca	Jonathan	Jonathan	Nominated	Nominated	Winner (Day 85)	6
Bianca	Marco	Rosa	Cecilia	Paola	Paola	Elena	No; Nominations	Rosa	Simone	Simone	Francesca	Jonathan	Gaspare	Immune	Immune	Runner-up (Day 85)	6
Amaurys	Rosa	Filippo	Elena	Filippo	Rosa	Simone	No; Nominations	Simone	Gaspare to save	Francesca	Francesca	Jonathan	Jonathan	Immune	Nominated	3rd Place (Day 85)	5
Francesca	Nadia	Franco	Franco	Amaurys	Franco	Bianca	No; Nominations	Gaspare	Gaspare	Franco	Amaurys	Limbo	Nominated	Nominated	4th Place (Day 85)		11
Jonathan	Rosa	Nadia	Elena	Filippo	Elena	Francesca	No; Nominations	Exempt	Simone	Simone	Gaspare	Alessia	Gaspare	5th Place (Day 85)			10
Rosa	Nadia	Nadia	Alessia	Amaurys	Bianca	Bianca	No; Nominations	Alessia	Neverland		Limbo		Eliminated (Day 78)				9
Alessia	Marco	Rosa	Cecilia	Paola	Paola	Elena	No; Nominations	Rosa	Marco	Exempt	Amaurys to save	Jonathan	Eliminated (Day 78)				9
Elena	Not on Island	Exempt	Cecilia	Jonathan	Franco	Bianca	Neverland				Limbo	Eliminated (Day 72)					9
Franco	Marco	Francesca	Cecilia	Francesca	Francesca	Elena	No; Nominations	Simone	Simone	Francesca	Jonathan	Walked (Day 68)					10
Simone	Not on Island	Ghost; Contestant	Nominated	Filippo	Gaspare	Franco	No; Nominations	Amaurys	Jonathan	Franco	Eliminated (Day 65)						11
Marco	Chiara	Nadia	Cecilia	Franco	Franco	Alessia	No; Nominations	Alessia	Simone	Eliminated (Day 58)							9
Nadia	Marco	Rosa	Eliminated (Day 15)			Neverland			Eliminated (Day 50)								9
Paola	Nadia	Nadia	Alessia	Simone	Bianca	Neverland		Eliminated (Day 43)									5
Filippo	Marco	Nadia	Alessia	Jonathan	Eliminated (Day 30)	Neverland	Eliminated (Day 43)										5
Cecilia	Marco	Franco	Bianca	Eliminated (Day 23)		Neverland	Eliminated (Day 43)										8
Giucas	Craig	Francesca	Cecilia	Filippo	Exempt	Walked (Day 37)											0
Craig	Alessia	Cecilia	Cecilia	Walked (Day 23)													1
Francesco	Éva	Nadia	Walked (Day 14)														0
Éva	Marco	Eliminated (Day 8)															1
Chiara	Alessia	Walked (Day 7)															1
Nominated by Tribe	Marco	Francesca; Nadia	Cecilia	Amaurys; Filippo	Franco; Paola	Bianca; Elena	none	Alessia; Rosa; Simone	Jonathan; Marco; Simone	Francesca; Franco; Simone	Francesca; Gaspare; Jonathan	Alessia; Jonathan	Jonathan	none			
Nominated by Leader	Éva	Rosa	Alessia	Franco	Gaspare	Alessia	none										
Nominated due to a challenge / twist	none		Simone	none									Francesca	Francesca; Gaspare	Amaurys; Gaspare	none	
Eliminated	Éva; 77%	Nadia; 50%	Cecilia; 55%	Filippo; 66%	Paola; 68%	Elena; 61%	none	Rosa; 43%	Marco; 56%	Simone; 45%	Francesca; 51%	Alessia; 56%	Jonathan; 70%	Francesca; 51%	Amaurys; 63%	Bianca; 33% to win	
Eliminated	Éva; 77%	Nadia; 50%	Cecilia; 55%	Filippo; 66%	Paola; 68%	Elena; 61%	none	Rosa; 43%	Marco; 56%	Simone; 45%	Francesca; 51%	Alessia; 56%	Jonathan; 70%	Francesca; 51%	Amaurys; 63%	Gaspare; 67% to win	
Potential Contestants	Franco; 38% Deianira; 37% Valerio; 25%	none															
Neverland / Limbo Nominated	none					Cecilia; Filippo; Nadia; Paola	Elena; Nadia; Paola	Elena; Nadia; Rosa	none	Elena; Rosa; Simone	Elena; Francesca; Rosa	Francesca; Rosa	none				
Neverland / Limbo Eliminated	none					Cecilia; 17% to save Filippo; 20% to save	Paola; 37% to eliminate	Nadia; 36% to eliminate	none	Simone; 63% to eliminate	Elena; 10% to save	Rosa; 43% to save	none				

=== Notes ===
- Note 1: Simone entered the game as a Ghost Contestant and had to live on the Island without being caught by the other contestants. After failing to do so, he received a punishment and was automatically nominated in Week 3.

== TV Ratings and guests ==
Episode	Date	Viewers	Share	Guests
1	January 22, 2018	4,565,000	25.46%	none
2	January 29, 2018	4,661,000	24.80%	none
3	February 5, 2018	4,928,000	26.40%	none
4	February 13, 2018	3,807,000	21.60%	none
5	February 20, 2018	4,401,000	24.10%	none
6	February 27, 2018	4,501,000	23.80%	none
7	March 5, 2018	4,685,000	24.90%	none
8	March 12, 2018	4,383,000	23.30%	none
9	March 20, 2018	4,537,000	24.80%	none
10	March 27, 2018	4,360,000	22.40%	Valeria Marini
11	April 3, 2018	4,093,000	21.20%	none
Semifinal	April 9, 2018	4,466,000	23.70%	none
Final	April 16, 2018	4,545,000	26.43%	none
Average		4,456,000	24.07%	
