= Pietro Delle Piane =

Italian actor (born 1974)

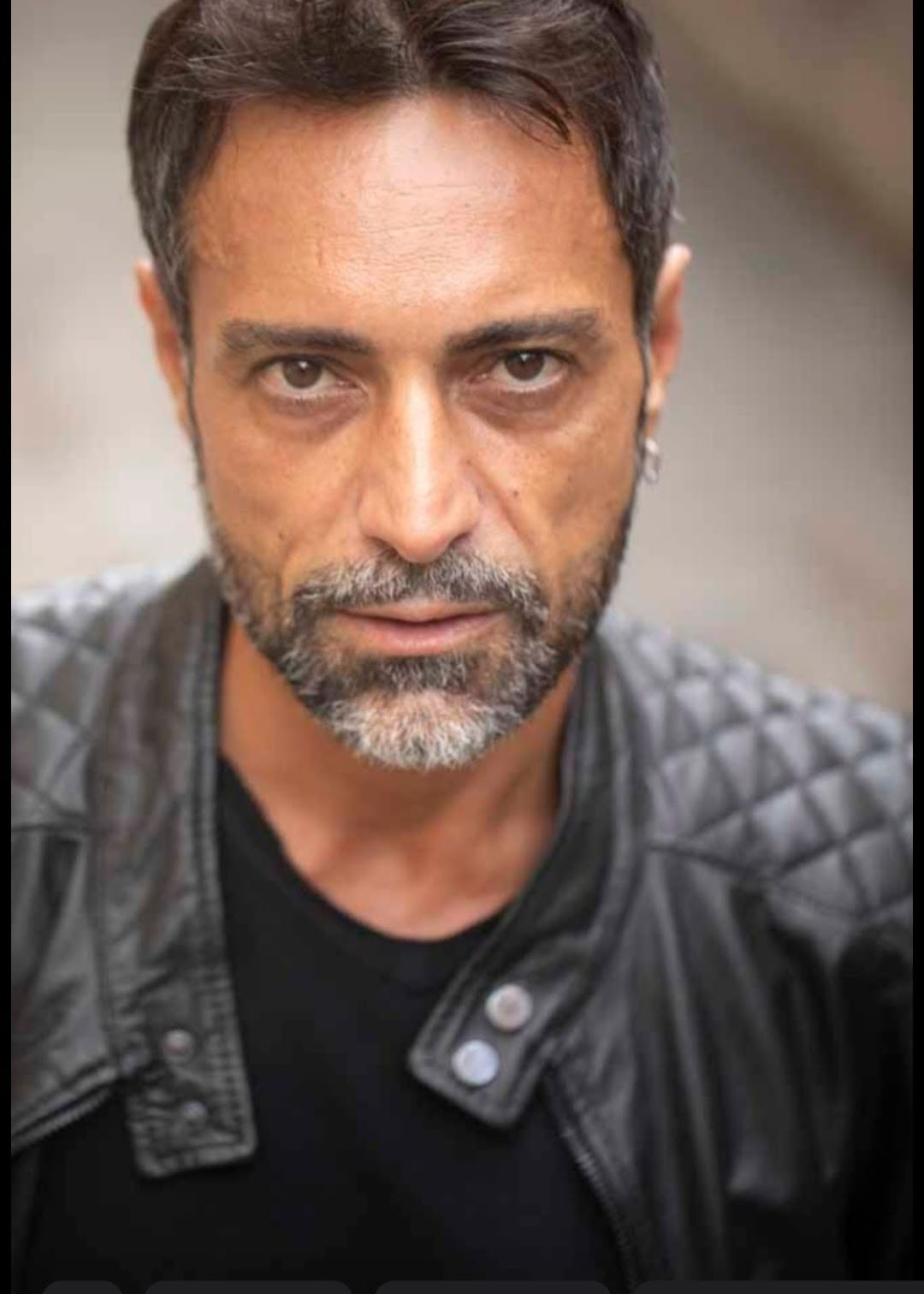
- Pietro Delle Piane in 2024
- Born: 21 May 1974 (age 52); Cosenza, Italy
- Citizenship: Italian
- Occupations: Actor, television personality, voice actor

Pietro Delle Piane also known as Pietro Le Piane (born 21 May 1974) is an Italian actor and television personality.

== Career ==
He attended a theatre workshop at the age of 15. He completed his higher studies in law at the Magna Græcia University. He then moved to Rome and settled there permanently to pursue his career in acting. He eventually teamed up with director Fioretta Mari after attending his acting and diction school in 1998 and appeared in various Italian stage theatre acts. He received 2019 ITFF Prize for his role in the film Rapiscimi (2018).

In 2020, he participated as a live show guest in the 4th season of the Grande Fratello VIP accompanying Antonella Elia. Some media reports rumoured regarding the close relationship between Pietro and Antonella Elia from 2018. Recently claimed to be a foot fetishist.

In the summer of 2020, he participated with partner Antonella Elia, whom he met in 2019, in the eighth edition of Temptation Island.

== Filmography ==
=== Actor ===
Cinema

- Odi et amo (Hate and Love), directed by Maurizio Anania (1997)
- I fetentoni (The Stinkers), directed by Alessandro Di Robilant (1998)
- Vacanze sulla neve (Ski Vacations), directed by Mariano Laurenti (1999)
- Il Conte di Melissa (The Count of Melissa), directed by Maurizio Anania (1999)
- Intrigue in Cuba/Positive Life, directed by Riccardo Leoni (2000)
- www.maresca.it, directed by Giovanni Luca Gargano (2002) - short film
- Il monastero (The Monastery), directed by Antonio Bonifacio (2003)
- La lettera (The Letter), directed by Luciano Cannito (2003)
- L'abbuffata (The Binge), directed by Mimmo Calopresti (2006)
- La morte di Pietra (The Death of a Stone), directed by Roberto Lippolis (2007)
- I mostri oggi (Monsters Today), directed by Enrico Oldoini (2008)
- Dange, directed by Roberto Lippolis (2008)
- Le ultime 56 ore (The Last 56 Hours), directed by Claudio Fragasso (2009)
- 5 (Cinque) [5 (Five)], directed by Francesco Dominedò (2009)
- La stanza di Giada (Jade's Room), directed by Stanislava Ivanova (2009) - short film
- Aspromonte, directed by Hedy Krissane (2011)
- La moglie del sarto (The Tailor's Wife), directed by Massimo Scaglione (2011)
- Bologna 2 agosto (Bologna August 2), directed by Daniele Santamaria Maurizio (2011)
- Lo sposalizio-matrimonio siciliano (The Sicilian Wedding), directed by Francesco Lama (2011) - short film
- Il ragioniere della mafia (The Mafia's accountant), directed by Federico Rizzo (2012)
- Cuore sommerso (Submerged Heart), directed by Federico Lubino (2012) - short film
- Mirafiori Lunapark, directed by Stefano Di Polito (2013)
- L'imbarcadero (The Jetty/The Boarding House), directed by Marco Caputo and Davide Imbrogno (2014) - short film
- Il ragazzo della Giudecca (The Boy from Giudecca), directed by Alfonso Bergamo (2015)
- MMA - Love Never Dies, directed by Riccardo Ferrero (2016)
- 5 minuti (5 minutes), directed by Pietro Delle Piane (2016) - short film
- Rapiscimi (Kidnap Me), directed by Giovanni Luca Gargano (2017)
- Calibro 9 (Caliber 9), directed by Toni D'angelo (2019)
- La versione di giuda - regia di Giulio Base (2024)

=== Television ===
- Cronaca di un ricatto (Chronicle of a Blackmail), directed by Danilo Massi (1999) - TV movie
- La voce del sangue (The voice of blood) directed by Alessandro Di Robilant - TV miniseries (1999)
- Il procuratore (The Prosecutor), directed by Danilo Massi - TV movie (2000)
- Distretto di Polizia (Police District), directed by Renato De Maria (2000)
- Casa famiglia (Family House), directed by Riccardo Donna (2000)
- Chiaroscuro, directed by Tomaso Sherman - TV miniseries (2001)
- La squadra (The Team), directed by Bruno Bigoni - TV series (2001)
- Il papa buono (The Good Pope), directed by Ricky Tognazzi - TV miniseries (2002)
- Salvo D'Acquisto (Soldier of Purchase), directed by Alberto Sironi - TV miniseries (2002)
- Amiche (Friends), directed by Paolo Poeti - TV miniseries (2003)
- Diritto di difesa (Right to Defense) - TV series (2003)
- Incantesimo (The Spell), directed by Tomaso Sherman and Alessandro Cane - TV serial (2004)
- Il giudice Mastrangelo (Judge Mastrangelo), directed by Enrico Oldoini (2004)
- 48 ore (48 Hours), directed by Eros Puglielli (2005)
- Un posto al sole (A place in the sun) - TV series (2005)
- R.I.S. 2 - Delitti imperfetti (R.I.S. 2 - Flawed Crimes), directed by Alexis Sweet - TV series, episode 2x09 (2006)
- In fuga con Marlene (On the Run with Marlene), directed by Alfredo Peyretti - TV movie (2007)
- Quo vadis, baby? (Where are you going, baby?), directed by Guido Chiesa - TV miniseries (2008)
- Carabinieri 7, directed by Raffaele Mertes (2008)
- Rex 2, directed by Marco Serafini - TV series (2008)
- Intelligence - Servizi & segreti (Intelligence - Services & Secrets), directed by Alexis Sweet (2009)
- Area Paradiso (Paradise Area), directed by Diego Abatantuono and Armando Trivellini - TV movie (2010)
- SMS, directed by Enzo Taglialatela - TV series (2010)
- Artemisia, directed by Marco Visalberghi - documentary film (2011)
- Il caso Enzo Tortora - Dove eravamo rimasti? (The Enzo Tortora case - Where were we?), directed by Ricky Tognazzi - TV miniseries (2012)
- Vi perdono ma inginocchiatevi (I forgive you but kneel down), directed by Claudio Bonivento - TV movie (2012)
- Il tredicesimo apostolo (The Thirteenth Apostle), directed by Alexis Sweet - TV series (2012)
- Spleen, directed by Cristian De Mattheis - webseries (2013)
- La narcotici (Narcotics), directed by Michele Soavi - TV series (2013)
- Squadra mobile (Mobile Squad), directed by Alexis Sweet - TV series (2014)
- L'infiltrato - Operazione clinica degli orrori (The infiltrator - Clinical operation of horrors), directed by Giovanni Filippetto and Cristiano Barbarossa - documentary film (2014)
- Boris Giuliano - Un poliziotto a Palermo (Boris Giuliano - A policeman in Palermo), directed by Ricky Tognazzi - TV miniseries (2015)
- L'amore strappato (Torn love), directed by Ricky Tognazzi and Simona Izzo - TV miniseries (2018)
- Il commissario Montalbano (Inspector Montalbano) - TV series, episode: La rete di protezione, directed by Luca Zingaretti (2020)
- Citofonare Rai 2 (2023-2024)
- La voce di cupido (2024) -regia di Ago Panini

=== Screenwriter ===
- 5 minuti (5 minutes), directed by Pietro Delle Piane (2016) - short film

== Television ==
- Temptation Island (Canale 5, 2020) - paired with his partner Antonella Elia

== Theater ==
- Seasons 1990/1995: Teatro Popolare Calabrese (Calabrian Popular Theatre)
- 2001 Fateci un applauso di Fioretta Mari (Give us a round of applause by Fioretta Mari) (debut: Teatro Tirso/Rome)
- 2002 F.F. FemmineFortissime di Fioretta Mari (F.F. Femmine Fortissime by Fioretta Mari) (in competition at the Festival delle Serre in Cerisano)
- 2013 Gelatina Umana di Ugo Mangini (Human Jelly by Ugo Mangini) (taken some passages from Crime and Punishment by Fyodor Dostoevsky)
