= Il collegio =

- Narrated by: Giancarlo Magalli (2017-2019, 2020-2021); Eric Alexander and Simona Ventura (2019); Nino Frassica (2022); Stefano De Martino (2023)
- Country of origin: Italy
- Original language: Italian
- No. of seasons: 8
- No. of episodes: 49

Production
- Running time: 120-130 min (2017-2019); 130-150 min (2020-2022); 90-120 min (2023)

Original release
- Network: Rai Gulp
- Release: 2 January 2017 – 5 November 2023

Il Collegio is a popular Italian historical reality show that has aired on Rai Due since January 2017.

In the first three seasons the show is narrated by Giancarlo Magalli. In the fourth season it is narrated by Eric Alexander and Simona Ventura. The series is based on the format of the British Channel 4 series That'll Teach 'Em.

The helpers of the filming are Sofia Nirie (for the 1st, 2nd, 3rd, and 4th edition), and Seungmin Jung (for the 5th and 6th edition).

== Concept ==
Several high school aged teenagers between the ages of 12 and 18 have to study for 2 weeks

in a boarding school where the curriculum is based on education between the late 1950s and the early 2000s. The students must follow a strict dress code and give up their phones and electronics during the month, and inappropriate haircuts, any kind of piercings and foul language are all forbidden. Students may be put in isolation or expelled if they do not follow these rules.

Student dormitories are separated by gender. Classes are given in Italian, Latin, history, geography, mathematics, biology, a foreign language (French in the second season, English in the third, fourth, fifth and sixth), civics and art. Elective classes are physical education, choral music and singing, music education, dance, aerobics, and computer science. At the end of the month the students are required to take an exam (written and oral). If they pass they are presented with a diploma suited to the period that season is set in.

The first season was set in 1960, year of the Olympic Games in Rome and broadcast from 2 to 23 January 2017.

The series was renewed for a second season set in 1961 (the 100th anniversary of the Unification of Italy), and was broadcast from 26 September to 17 October 2017. This season introduced the figure of the class representative (one for boys and one for girls), and the addition of French as a foreign language.

The third season, set in 1968, was broadcast from 12 February 2019 to 12 March for a total of five episodes. In this season English replaced French as a foreign language, Civics replaced Latin, Art and Music education was added. In the summer following the third season, Clementoni released a board dedicated to the program.

The fourth season is set in 1982, the year in which Italy won the FIFA World Cup, and aired from 22 October 2019 to 26 November 2019 for six episodes, featuring computer science, aerobics and breakdancing as non-exam activities.

The fifth season, which was set in 1992, aired from 27 October 2020 to 15 December 2020. In this edition, the school where the show has been registered is the Convitto Nazionale Regina Margherita in Anagni in the Province of Frosinone, due to heavy COVID-19 pandemic spread in Lombardy. 1992 has been one of the darkest years of Italian history, due to the killings of judges Giovanni Falcone and Paolo Borsellino by the Sicilian Mafia; and the political corruption scandal known as Tangentopoli (Bribesville) for which there was the consequent national judicial investigation known as Mani pulite (Clean Hands), which discovered various instances of corruption and briberies within the Italian politics. This scandal caused the dissolving of the Christian Democracy party, that, together with the previous dissolution of the Italian Communist Party in 1991 caused by the dissolution of the Soviet Union in the same year and consequent disillusionment with Communism in some Italian communist politicians, especially the then Secretary of the Party Achille Occhetto, caused by this and the previous fall during the previous years of the others communist governments in Eastern Europe, in turn was one of the major causes which brought to the creation of the Second Italian Republic in two years.

The sixth season is set in 1977, the year in which RAI started to broadcast programs in color for the first time. It aired from 26 October 2021 to 14 December 2021.

The seventh season is set in 1958, a year in which students in Italy were still separated in lower secondary education according to the fact if they wanted to, after completing the middle school to continue to study in high school or not. This was the first seasons in which there weren't entrance exams and in which class representatives weren't elected. It aired from 18 October 2022 to 29 November 2022.

The eighth edition is set in 2001, the year of 9/11 attacks. It aired from 24 September 2023 to 5 November 2023.

After a year of hiatus, a ninth season has been produced, set in 1990.

=== Subjects ===
Subjects	Season								Total
Subjects	1	2	3	4	5	6	7	8	Total
Italian language and literature									8
Latin language									3
Civic Education									4
History and Geography									8
Natural sciences (biology, chemistry, earth sciences)									8
Mathematic									8
Physical education and Sports									8
Music									8
Dance (Note: Breakdance in the fourth season.)									8
French Foreign Language and Culture									2
Domestic economy									4
Technical applications									5
English Foreign Language and Culture									5
Art History									5
Aerobics									1
Computer Science / Information Technology									4
Acting									2
Sex education									2
Cinema									1
Drawing									1
Technical-practical disciplines									1
Aesthetics laboratory									1
Chinese Foreign Language and Culture									1
Spanish Foreign language and culture									1

== Production ==
The school the series takes place in is the Collegio San Carlo di Celana, a suburb of Caprino Bergamasco. The fifth edition takes place in Anagni at the Convitto Nazionale Regina Margherita, and so does the sixth edition.

== Seasons ==
Season	Period		Episode	Headmaster	Supervisor		Narrator		Students	Best Students		Setting	Location
Season	Start	End	Episode	Headmaster	Supervisor		Narrator		Students	Best Students		Setting	Location
1	January 2, 2017	January 23, 2017	4	Paolo Bosisio	Luigi Ferrante	Lucia Gravante	Giancarlo Magalli		18	Swami Caputo	Giovanni Petrigliano	1960	Collegio San Carlo Celana (Caprino Bergamasco)
2	September 26, 2017	October 17, 2017	4	Alberto Faverio	Luigi Ferrante	Lucia Gravante	Giancarlo Magalli		18	Maddalena Sarti	Edoardo Maragno	1961	Collegio San Carlo Celana (Caprino Bergamasco)
3	February 12, 2019	March 12, 2019	5	Paolo Bosisio	Piero Maggiò	Lucia Gravante	Giancarlo Magalli		22	Beatrice Cossu	Riccardo Tosi	1968	Collegio San Carlo Celana (Caprino Bergamasco)
4	October 22, 2019	November 26, 2019	6	Paolo Bosisio	Piero Maggiò	Lucia Gravante	Simona Ventura	Eric Alexander	22	Roberta Zacchero	Mario Tricca	1982	Collegio San Carlo Celana (Caprino Bergamasco)
5	October 27, 2020	December 15, 2020	8	Paolo Bosisio	Massimo Sabet	Lucia Gravante	Giancarlo Magalli		24	Sofia Cerio	Andrea Di Piero	1992	Collegio Convitto Nazionale Regina Margherita (Anagni)
6	October 26, 2021	December 14, 2021	8	Paolo Bosisio	Matteo Caremoli	Lucia Gravante	Giancarlo Magalli		23	Maria Sofia Federico	Edoardo Lo Faso	1977	Collegio Convitto Nazionale Regina Margherita (Anagni)
7	October 18, 2022	November 29, 2022	8	Paolo Bosisio	Matteo Caremoli	Lucia Gravante	Nino Frassica		23	Zelda Nobili		1958	Collegio Convitto Nazionale Regina Margherita (Anagni)
8ª	September 24, 2023	November 5, 2023	6	Paolo Bosisio	Matteo Caremoli	Lucia Gravante	Stefano De Martino		25	Diego Natale		2001	Collegio San Francesco (Lodi)

== Cast ==
=== Season 1 - Collegio 1960 ===
==== Teachers ====
- Paolo Bosisio (Headmaster)
- Andrea Maggi (Italian Language and Literature; Latin Language)
- Annalisa Ciampalini (Mathematics)
- Piera Condotti (Science)
- Emilia Termignoni (History and Geography)
- Fabio Cacioppoli (Physical Education and Technical Education (Males))
- Marco La Rosa (Dance and Ballet)
- Maestro Matteo Valbusa (Musical Education)

==== Guardians ====
- Lucia Gravante (Technical Education teacher (Females) as well)
- Luigi Ferrante

==== Students (year of birth and place of residence) ====
- Swami Caputo (2000, Florence)
- Giovanni Petrigliano (2000, Matera)
- Carla Addonisio (2000, Macerata Campania (CE))
- Filippo Moras (1999, Castelnuovo Scrivia (AL))
- Silvia di Santo (2001, Turin)
- Ludovica Olgiati (2002, Parabiago (MI))
- Pietro Dell'Aquila (2002, Villaricca (NA))
- Filippo Zamparini (2002, Varese)
- Alessio Milanesi (2001, Bari)
- Veronica Mastro (2000, Rome)
- Marika Ferrarelli (2000, Naples)
- Jenny de Nucci (2000, Limbiate (MB))
- Federico Nobile (2002, Florence)
- Adriano Occulto (2000, Brebbia (VA))
- Arianna Pasin (2001, Merate (LC))
- Dimitri Iannone (1999, Villa Literno (CE))
- Davide Erba (2001, Monza)
- Letizia del Signore (2002, Viterbo).

The following students withdrew from the programme:

- Arianna Pasin (Third Episode)
- Davide Erba (Second Episode)
- Letizia del Signore (First Episode)

The following students were expelled:

- Dimitri Iannone (Third Episode) - expelled for insubordination

The following students failed their exams:

- Adriano Occulto (not admitted to the oral exams)
- Federico Nobile
- Jenny de Nucci

On 19 May 2024, Dimitri Iannone died due to a car accident at the age of 24.

=== Season 2 - Collegio 1961 ===
==== Teachers ====
- Alberto Faverio (Headmaster)
- Andrea Maggi (Italian Language and Literature; Latin Language)
- Mariarosa Petolicchio (Mathematics and Science)
- Luca Raina (History and Geography)
- Berta Corvi (French Language)
- Fabio Cacioppoli (Physical Education and Technical Education (Males))
- Maestro Massimo Fiocchi Malaspina (Musical Education)
- Marco Larosa (Dance and Ballet)

==== Guardians ====
- Luigi Ferrante
- Lucia Gravante (Technical Education teacher (Females) as well)

==== Students ====
- Maddalena Sarti (2001, Molinella (BO))
- Edoardo Maragno (2000, Spino d'Adda (CR))
- Nagga Baldina (2003, Garbagna Novarese (NO))
- Brunella Cacciuni (2002, Torre del Greco (NA))
- Gabrielle Paul Sarmiento (2000, Rome)
- Michelle Cavallaro (2003, Azzano Decimo (PN))
- Elisabetta Gibilisco (2002, Floridia (SR))
- Ginevra Mandolese (2002, San Nicolò a Tordino (TE))
- Davide Moccia (2002, Casaluce (CE))
- Federico Mancosu (2000, Vimodrone (MI))
- Noa Planas (2002, Gabicce Mare (PU))
- Giuseppe Spitaleri (2000, Palermo)
- Gaia Malgeri (2001, Villanova d'Asti (AT)
- Dimitri Tincano (2001, Terni)
- Arianna Triassi (2001, Naples)
- Marco Biò (2000, Milan)
- Roberto Magro (2003, Monza)
- Camilla Ricciardi (2003, Genoa)

The following students withdrew from the programme:

- Marco Biò (Third Episode)
- Camilla Maria Ricciardi (Second Episode)

The following students have been expelled:

- Roberto Magro (Third Episode) - after being excessively punished and being the worst student in terms of results, he was given a special examination. He failed it, hence he was expelled
- Arianna Triassi (Fourth Episode) - expelled for continuous misbehaving

=== Season 3 - Collegio 1968 ===
==== Teachers ====
- Paolo Bosisio (Headmaster)
- Andrea Maggi (Italian Language and Civic Education)
- Mariarosa Petolicchio (Mathematics and Science)
- David Wayne Callahan (English Language)
- Diana Cavagnaro (Musical Education)
- Luca Raina (History and Geography)
- Dario Cipani (Physical Education)
- Marco Larosa (Dance and Ballet)
- Alessandro Carnevale (Artistic Education)

==== Guardians and Technical Education Teachers ====
- Piero Maggiò (Males)
- Lucia Gravante (Females)

==== Students ====
- Beatrice Cossu (2001, Bareggio (MI))
- Riccardo Tosi (2001, Verona)
- Noemi Ortona (2003, Milan)
- Elia Libero Gumiero (2004, Campolongo Maggiore (VE))
- William Carrozzo (2001, Galliate (NO))
- Youssef Komeiha (2002, Naples)
- Gabriele de Chiara (2001, Rome)
- Alice Carbotti (2003, San Donato Milanese (MI))
- Giulia Mannucci (2002, Rome)
- Jennifer Poni (2001, Ranica (BG))
- Nicole Rossi (2001, Rome)
- Esteban Frigerio (2003, Como)
- Alice de Bortoli (2003, Casale sul Sile (TV))
- Matias Caviglia (2003, Massalengo (LO))
- Luca Cobelli (2001, Settimo Milanese (MI))
- Cora Fazzini (2002, Città Sant'Angelo (PE))
- Marilù Fazzini (2002, Città Sant'Angelo (PE))
- Michael Gambuzza (2002, Milan)
- Evan Nestola (2002, Milan)
- Ginevra Pirola (2002, Bollate (MI))
- Syria d'Ambra (2003,Milan)
- Luca Vitozzi (2001, Forlì)

The following students withdrew from the programme:

- Ginevra Pirola (Second Episode)

The following students were expelled:

- Cora and Marilù Fazzini (Fifth Episode) - Cora Fazzini was sent to the principal's office after using a derogatory term to Professor Raina and was expelled due to her continuous bad behaviour. Marilù, for defending her sister, was also expelled.
- Michael Gambuzza (Third Episode) - he raised his voice to Professor Petolicchio and was expelled.
- Evan Nestola (Third Episode) - he was expelled for cutting his hair, tarnishing the college's image.

The following students failed at the final exam:

- Luca Cobelli - he was not admitted to the oral exams
- Matias Caviglia

The following students entered at the second episode:

- Luca Cobelli
- Alice de Bortoli

The following students were not admitted after failing the entry test:

- Luca Vitozzi
- Syria d'Ambra

=== Fourth Season - Collegio 1982 ===
==== Teachers ====
- Paolo Bosisio (Headmaster)
- Andrea Maggi (Italian Language and Literature; Civic Education)
- Mariarosa Petolicchio (Mathematics and Science)
- Luca Raina (History and Geography)
- David Wayne Callahan (English Language)
- Giovanna Giovannini (Musical Education)
- Alessandro Carnevale (Artistic Education)
- Daniele Calanna (Physical Education)
- Carmelo Trainito (Break Dance)
- Marilisa Pino (substitute teacher for Italian and Civic Education)
- Carlo Santagostino (Information and Communication Technology)
- Max Bruschi (Government School Inspector)

==== Guardians and Technical Education Teachers ====
- Piero Maggiò (Males)
- Lucia Gravante (Females)

==== Students ====
- Roberta Zacchero (2002, Turin)
- Mario Tricca (2004, Castel Madama (RM))
- Maggy Gioia (2005, Milan)
- Samuele Fazzi (2001, Massa)
- Gabriele Montuori (2005, Marcianise (CE))
- Giulio Maggio (2004, Montespertoli (FI))
- Niccolò Robbiano (2003, Quattordio (AL))
- Vilma D'Addario (2004, Potenza)
- Mariana Aresta (2003, Bitritto (BA))
- Vincenzo Crispino (2003, Naples)
- George Ciupilan (2002, Stella (SV))
- Gianni Musella (2002, Moncalieri (TO))
- Sara Piccione (2003, Dolo (VE))
- Martina Brondin (2002, Albignasego (PD))
- Francesco Cardamone (2005, Rome)
- Asia Busciantella (2004, Trevi (PG))
- Chiara Adamuccio (2002, Scorrano (LE))
- Claudia Dorelfi (2005, Rome)
- Alex Djordjevic (2004, Nerviano (MI))
- Andrea Bellantoni (2002, Pomezia (RM))
- Alysia Piccamiglio (2003, Soldano (IM))
- Benedetta Matera (2005, Naples)

The following students withdrew from the programme:

- Benedettagea Matera (First Episode)

The following students were expelled:

- Claudia Dorelfi (Fifth Episode) - Claudia was returned to school as a punishment for misbehaving at a field trip. As she had misbehaved several times beforehand, including being suspended and isolated for 48 hours, the headmaster decided that the class assembly had to decide whether she was to remain or leave. The latter option won, 10 votes Vs 7.
- Andrea Bellantoni (Fourth Episode) - he organised a fake brawl to avoid participating to a maths lesson. He was excluded from a field trip and later was tested on the week's syllabus, failing which, he was expelled.
- Alex Djordjevic (Fourth Episode) - expelled for the same reason as Andrea Bellantoni.
- Alysia Piccamiglio (Second Episode) - she was one of the students forced to resit the entry test after an overnight misbehaviour. Having failed it, she was told to return home.

The following students failed at the final exam:

- Francesco Cardamone
- Martina Brondin
- Asia Busciantella Ricci
- Chiara Adamuccio (not admitted to the oral exams).

The following students entered at the third episode:

- Andrea Bellantoni
- Chiara Adamuccio

The following students failed the entry test:

- Alex Djordjevic
- Benedettagea Matera
- Samuele Fazzi
- George Ciupilan
- Sara Piccione

Samuele Fazzi, Alex Djordjevic, George Ciupilan and Sara Piccione were then admitted to the Collegio as, by not participating at the overnight disorder with their classmates, were exempted from a resit exam. Benedettagea Matera withdrew.

The following students caused an overnight fracas. Their admission was revoked and they had to resit the entry test:

- Roberta Maria Zacchero
- Mario Tricca
- Gabriele Montuori
- Giulio Maggio
- Nicolò Robbiano
- Vilma Maria d'Addario
- Mariana Aresta
- Vincenzo Crispino
- Gianni Nunzio Musella
- Martina Brondin
- Francesco Cardamone
- Asia Busciantella Ricci
- Claudia Dorelfi
- Alysia Piccamiglio

All of the above passed the test and were readmitted, except Alysia Piccamiglio, who had to return home.

=== Fifth Season - Collegio 1992 ===
==== Teachers ====
- Paolo Bosisio (Headmaster)
- Andrea Maggi (Italian Language and Literature; Civic Education)
- Mariarosa Petolicchio (Mathematics and Science)
- Luca Raina (History and Geography)
- David Wayne Callahan (English Language)
- Alessandro Carnevale (Artistic Education)
- Valentina Gottlieb (Physical Education)
- Patrizio Cigliano (Drama)
- Roberta Sette (Sex Education)
- Marco Chingari (Singing)
- Carlo Santagostino (Information and Communication Technology)

==== Students ====
- Alessandro Andreini (2004, San Giovanni in Marignano(RN))
- Marco Crivellini (2003, Rome)
- Bonard Dago (2003, Zero Branco (TV))
- Andrea Di Piero (2004, Fiuggi (FR))
- Giordano Francati (2003, Rome)
- Alessandro Guida (2006, Civitavecchia (RM))
- Rahul Teoli (2004, Piombino (LI))
- Davide Vavalà (2004, Bologna)
- Luca Zigliana (2005, Zanica (BG))
- Andrea Prezioso (2002, Locorotondo (BA))
- Leonardo Prezioso (2002, Locorotondo (BA))
- Usha Teoli (2002, Piombino (LI))
- Linda Bertollo (2006, Ivrea (TO))
- Sofia Cerio (2004, Pesaro)
- Maria Teresa Cristini (2005, Genova)
- Ylenia Grambone (2003, Vallo della Lucania (SA))
- Giulia Matera (2004, Salerno)
- Rebecca Mongelli (2005, Sesto Fiorentino (FI))
- Giulia Maria Scarano (2006, Manfredonia (FG))
- Luna Lucrezia Scognamiglio (2003, Vietri sul Mare (SA))
- Simone Bettin (2003, San Miniato (PI))
- Aurora Vanessa Morabito (2003, Savona)
- Luca Lapolla (2004, Prato)
- Mishel Gashi (2005, Calolziocorte (LC))

The following students were expelled:

- Aurora Vanessa Morabito (Third episode) - expelled for insulting the male guardian during a nervous crisis.
- Marco Crivellini (Fourth episode) - expelled along with Simone Bettin for their continuous misbehaving.
- Simone Bettin (Fourth episode) - expelled along with Marco Crivellini for their continuous misbehaving.
- Rebecca Mongelli (Fourth episode) - she didn’t receive the red jacket because her results were insufficient, so she had to return home.
- Ylenia Grambone (Sixth episode) - expelled because she disrespected to professor Maggi.
- Alessandro Andreini (Sixth episode) - expelled because he disrespected to professor Maggi.
- Rahul Teoli (Seventh episode) - he almost got expelled due to his conduct, but at the gates, he was given another chance, but later he was expelled again because he raised the hands up on Luca Zigliana.

The following students failed the entry test:

- Luca Lapolla
- Mishel Gashi

The following students entered in the fourth episode:

- Leonardo Prezioso
- Andrea Prezioso

The following student failed at the final exam:

- Andrea Prezioso

=== Season 6 - Collegio 1977 ===
==== Teachers ====
- Paolo Bosisio (Headmaster)
- Andrea Maggi (Italian Language and civic Education)
- Mariarosa Petolicchio (Mathematics and Science)
- Luca Raina (History and Geography)
- Denise McNee (English Language)
- Alessandro Carnevale (Artistic Education)
- Duccio Curione (Physical Education)
- Lorenzo Vignolo (Drama)
- Silvia Smaniotto (Music)

==== Guardians ====
- Lucia Gravante
- Matteo Caremoli

==== Students (year of birth and place of residence) ====
- Sara Masserini (2005, Colzate(BG)
- Alessandro Giglio (2006, Turin)
- Gaia Cascino (2004, Rome)
- Giovanni Junior D'ambrosio (2006, Naples)
- Federica Cangiano (2007, Naples)
- Davide Maroni (2005, Nova Milanese (MB))
- Vincenzo Rubino (2005, Bari)
- Rebecca Parziale (2007, Genoa)
- Lorenzo Sena (2007, Viareggio (LU))
- Maria Sofia Federico (2005, Valmontone (RM))
- Cristiano Karol Russo (2005, San Pietro Vernotico (BR))
- Sveva Accorrà (2007, Monza)
- Simone Casadei (2004, Coriano, (RN))
- Beatrice 'Kim' Genco (2007, Paderno Dugnano (MI)
- Filippo Romano (2007, Scandicci (FI))
- Elisa Cimbaro (2006, Tarvisio (UD))
- Valentina Comelli (2006, Zone (BS))
- Raffaele Fiorella (2005, Barletta)
- Anastasia Podeschi (2004, Santarcangelo di Romagna (RN))

The following students entered in the second episode:

- Matilde Ricorda

The following students entered in the fifth episode:

- Matteo Palazzo
- Davide Cresta

The following students withdrew from the programme:

- Sveva Accorrà (Second Episode)
- Gaia Cascino (Third episode)

The following students were expelled:

- Davide Maroni (Third episode) - kicked out for disrespecting professor McNee, and not applying to her rules.
- Simone Casadei (Fourth episode) - expelled for continuous misbehaving.
- Federica Cangiano (Fifth episode) - she couldn’t get the red necktie as her results being insufficient, so she had to return home.
- Alessandro Giglio (Sixth episode) - expelled after clashing with his classmates after an accident in the dormitory.
- Davide Cresta (Eighth episode) - expelled before the oral exam after his written mathematics test was completely insufficient.

=== Season 7 - Collegio 1958 ===
==== Teachers ====
- Paolo Bosisio (Headmaster)
- Andrea Maggi (Italian Language and latin; latin in section A only)
- Giovanni Belli (Mathematics and Science)
- Anna Maria Petolicchio (History and Geography)
- Marie France Baron (French Language)
- Guido Airoldi (Drawing)
- Alberto Zanetti (Choir)
- Andrea Zilli (Technical and practical disciplines in section B only, and technical applications)
- Annalisa Bufacchi (Aestethic laboratory, section B only)
- Mauro Simonetti (Physical education)
- Valeria Bonfanti (Dance)

==== Guardians ====
- Lucia Gravante
- Matteo Caremoli

==== Students (year of birth and place of residence) and divided by section A (Middle school) and section B (Professional startup school) ====
- Zelda Nobili (2007, Trieste) (A)
- Davide Di Franco (2005, Bisceglie (BT)) (B)
- Harry Erriquez (2006, Venaria Reale (TO)) (B)
- Priscilla Savoldelli (2006, Gandino (BG)) (A)
- Giada Scognamillo (2004, Genoa) (B)
- Giulia Wnekowicz (2006, Figline Valdarno (FI)) (A)
- Alessandro Bosatelli (2008, Brembate (BG)) (A)
- Sofia Brixel (2006, Chiavari (GE)) (A)
- Mattia Patanè (2007, Riposto (CT)) (A)
- Samuel Rosica (2005, Bitonto (BA)) (B)
- Luna Tota (2007, Rome) (A)
- Sabrina Bacja (2005, Verona) (A)
- Mattia Camorani (2006, Faenza (RA)) (B)
- Gabriel Rennis (2006, Rome) (A)
- Alessia Abruscia (2007, Catanzaro) (B)
- Elisa Angius (2006, Cagliari) (B)
- Ariadny Sorbello (2006, Dublin) (A)
- Davide Cagnes (2004, Montebelluna (TV)) (B)
- Damiano Severoni (2006, Tivoli (RM)) (B)
- Tommaso Miglietta (2008, Lizzanello (LE)) (A)
- Alessandro Orlando (2005, Torre Annunziata (NA)) (A)
- Apollinaire Manfredi (2007, Palagiano (TA)) (B)
- Victoria Lazzari (2007, Prato) (B)

The following students entered in the second episode:

- Ariadny Sorbello
- Sabrina Bacja
- Victoria Lazzari

The following students withdrew from the programme:

- Tommaso Miglietta (Fourth Episode)
- Damiano Severoni (Sixth episode)

The following students were expelled:

- Victoria Lazzari (Third episode) - expelled for insulting professor Zilli with vulgar words.
- Alessandro Orlando (Fourth episode) - While in a recovery state due to his GPA, he stole some phones, and for this he got expelled.
- Apollinaire Manfredi (Fourth episode) - While in a recovery state due to his GPA, he stole some phones, and for this he got expelled.

The following students failed at the final exam:

- Elisa Angius
- Ariadny Sorbello (not admitted to the oral exams).
- Davide Cagnes (not admitted to the oral exams).

== Ratings ==
Viewership and ratings per season of Il collegio
Season	Episodes	First aired		Last aired		Avg. viewers (millions)	18–49 rank
Season	Episodes	Date	Viewers (millions)	Date	Viewers (millions)	Avg. viewers (millions)	18–49 rank
1	4	January 2, 2017	2.132	January 23, 2017	2.134	TBD	TBD
2	4	September 26, 2017	1.820	October 17, 2017	1.692	TBD	TBD
3	5	February 12, 2019	1.634	March 12, 2019	2.307	TBD	TBD
4	6	October 22, 2019	2.433	November 26, 2019	2.352	TBD	TBD
