= Grande Fratello VIP season 4 =

Reality television show aired in Italy

Grande Fratello VIP
- Season 4
- Presented by: Alfonso Signorini
- No. of days: 92
- No. of housemates: 29
- Winner: Paola Di Benedetto
- Runner-up: Paolo Ciavarro

Release
- Original network: Canale 5
- Original release: 8 January – 8 April 2020

Season chronology
- ← Previous; Season 3 Next → Season 5

Grande Fratello VIP 4 (as known by the acronym GFVIP4) is the fourth celebrity season of the Italian reality television franchise Grande Fratello.

The show was launched on 8 January 2020 on Canale 5, the journalist Alfonso Signorini as presenter of the main show after Ilary Blasi left the show after three seasons, with the showgirl Wanda Nara and the singer Pupo as opinionists. The live stream is broadcast on Mediaset Extra and Grande Fratello official website, also La 5 broadcast several times per day. Daily recaps are broadcast on Canale 5 and Italia 1.

For the first time in Grande Fratello history, the show features two live shows within a week, except Sanremo Music Festival week when the show only aired one live show on Monday 3 February. With the beginning of the nineteenth season of the talent show Amici di Maria De Filippi in the prime time of Canale 5 on Friday 28 February, the Grande Fratello VIP 4 is aired only once a week starting from Monday 24 February.

On 1 March 2020, Mediaset announced that the show would be extended until Monday 27 April 2020, with the season being a total of 111 days.

Due to the COVID-19 pandemic in Italy, starting from 8 March, no more guest would be able to enter the house. Beginning with the sixteenth live show on Wednesday 11 March 2020 and continuing for the remainder of the show, all live shows would air without the audience in the studio to respects the governmental procedures imposed. And the length of the show was reduced to 92 days which finished on 8 April 2020.

Paola Di Benedetto was announced as the winner of the season.

== Housemates ==
The age of the housemates refers to the time of entry into the house.

Housemates	Age	Birthplace	Famous for...	Day entered	Day exited	Status
Paola Di Benedetto	25	Vicenza	Model	1	92	Winner
Paolo Ciavarro	28	Rome	TV personality, son of Eleonora Giorgi	1	92	Runner-up
Sossio Aruta	49	Castellammare di Stabia	TV personality and football player	48	92	3rd Place
Patrick Ray Pugliese	42	Tehran, Iran	TV personality, Grande Fratello season 4 and season 12 housemate	1	92	4th Place
Aristide Malnati	55	Milan	Archaeologist and papyrologist	3	92	5th Place
Antonella Elia	56	Turin	Actress and TV personality	1	92	6th Place
Andrea Denver	28	Verona	Model	1	92	17th Evicted
Teresanna Pugliese	32	Naples	Showgirl, opinionist and influencer	41	85	16th Evicted
Licia Nunez	41	Barletta	Actress	1	85	15th Evicted
Antonio Zequila	56	Atrani	TV personality	3	85	14th Evicted
Sara Soldati	20	Bologna	Influencer and model	41	78	13th Evicted
Fernanda Lessa	42	Rio de Janeiro, Brazil	Model and TV personality	3	78	12th Evicted
Adriana Volpe	46	Trento	TV personality	1	72	Walked
Valeria Marini	52	Rome	Showgirl, Grande Fratello VIP season 1 housemate	48	71	11th Evicted
Fabio Testi	78	Peschiera del Garda	Actor, Gran Hermano VIP season 1 housemate	1	71	10th Evicted
Asia Valente	23	Benevento	Influencer, model and Playboy playmate	41	64	9th Evicted
Andrea Montovoli	34	Porretta Terme	Actor	3	48	Walked
Clizia Incorvaia	39	Pordenone	Model and TV personality	1	48	Ejected
Pacifico "Pago" Settembre	48	Quartu Sant'Elena	Singer and TV personality	1	45	8th Evicted
Serena Enardu	43	Quartu Sant'Elena	TV personality	24	41	7th Evicted
Barbara Alberti	76	Umbertide	Writer	3	34	Walked
Michele Cucuzza	67	Catania	Journalist	1	34	6th Evicted
Carlotta Maggiorana	28	Montegiorgio	Actress and Miss Italia 2018	3	27	Walked
Rita Rusić	59	Poreč, Croatia	Actress and singer	1	24	5th Evicted
Iván González	27	Madrid, Spain	Model and TV personality	3	17	4th Evicted
Pasquale Laricchia	47	Bari	Personal trainer, Grande Fratello season 3 housemate	1	13	3rd Evicted
Sergio Volpini	44	Ancona	Surfist, Grande Fratello season 1 housemate	1	10	2nd Evicted
Elisa De Panicis	27	Milan	Model and influencer	3	10	1st Evicted
Salvo Veneziano	44	Syracuse	TV personality, Grande Fratello season 1 housemate	1	6	Ejected

=== Guests ===
Name	Age	Famous for...	Residence	Duration
Serena Enardu	43	TV personality	Quartu Sant'Elena	Day 1-3 (Note: During the first live show, a public vote was opened to determines whether Serena would be able to enter the house as the regular housemate. 51% of votes were chosen No.)
Valeria Marini	52	Showgirl, Grande Fratello VIP season 1 housemate	Rome	Day 20-21
Gianluca Irpino	31	TV personality	Milan	Day 20-24
Jacopo Poponcini	25	Model and footballer	Arezzo	Day 20-24
Matteo Alessandroni	25	Model, footballer and Personal trainer	Rome	Day 20-24

== Nominations table ==
=== Week 1 - Week 7 ===
	Week 1		Week 2				Week 3			Week 4		Week 5	Week 6		Week 7		Nominations received
	Day 1	Day 3	Day 8	Day 10		Day 13	Day 17	Day 20		Day 24	Day 27	Week 5	Day 38	Day 41	Day 45	Day 48	Nominations received
Favorite of the House	none					Adriana; Andrea; Aristide; Barbara; Pago; Paolo; Rita	none	Adriana; Andrea; Antonio; Aristide; Michele; Pago; Paolo; Rita	Saved	Adriana; Antonella; Antonio; Barbara; Fernanda; Licia; Pago; Paolo	Andrea; Antonella; Antonio; Aristide; Clizia; Denver; Fernanda; Licia	Adriana; Andrea; Antonio; Clizia; Fernanda; Paolo	Antonio; Clizia; Denver; Fernanda; Paola; Paolo	Adriana; Andrea; Antonella; Antonio; Clizia; Denver; Fernanda; Patrick	Adriana; Aristide; Denver; Fernanda; Licia; Patrick	Adriana; Antonio; Aristide; Fernanda; Licia; Patrick	Nominations received
Paola	Denver	Not eligible	Clizia	Not eligible	Michele	Carlotta	Barbara	Not eligible	Licia	Michele	Fabio	Fabio	Licia	Licia	Antonio	Fabio	
Paolo	Nominated	Licia	Iván	Not eligible	Iván	Fernanda	Fabio	Clizia	Fabio	Denver	Fabio	Licia	Licia	Licia	Fabio	~~Andrea~~; Fabio	
Sossio	Not in House															Exempt	
Patrick	In Privèe	Salvo	In Privèe	Nominated	Denver	Iván	Michele	Nominated	Michele	Michele	Barbara	Serena	Pago	Pago	Antonella	Antonella	
Aristide	Not in House	Exempt	Michele	Not eligible	Fabio	Carlotta	Patrick	Denver	Fabio	Patrick	Adriana	Patrick	Fabio	Pago	Clizia	Fabio	
Antonella	Fabio	Not eligible	Fernanda	Not eligible	Fabio	Iván	Barbara	Not eligible	Rita	Clizia	Fabio	~~Barbara~~; Serena	Fabio	Fabio	Andrea	~~Andrea~~; Fabio	
Denver	Nominated	Rita	Andrea	Not eligible	Pago	Not eligible	Fabio	Not eligible	Andrea	Barbara	Barbara	Serena	Pago	Pago	Clizia	Fabio	
Teresanna	Not in House													Potential; Housemate		Nominated	
Licia	Denver	Not eligible	Fernanda	Not eligible	Iván	Not eligible	Carlotta	Not eligible	Carlotta	Carlotta	Fabio	Aristide	Adriana	Pago	Paolo	Fabio	
Antonio	Not in House	Exempt	Andrea	Not eligible	Pago	Carlotta	Patrick	Fabio	Andrea	Barbara	Adriana	Pago	Adriana	Pago	Paola	Paola	
Sara	Not in House													Potential; Housemate		Nominated	
Fernanda	Not in House	Exempt	Antonella	Not eligible	Iván	Saved	Antonella	Not eligible	Clizia	Clizia	Pago	Serena	Antonella	Aristide	Antonella	Antonella	
Adriana	Paolo	Not eligible	Carlotta	Not eligible	Aristide	Fernanda	Rita	Paola	Rita	Denver	Barbara	Serena	Licia	Licia	Antonella	Antonella	
Valeria	Not in House							Guest		Not in House						Exempt	
Fabio	Nominated	Antonella	Iván	Not eligible	Iván	Not eligible	Pago	Not eligible	Aristide	Barbara	Paolo	Pago	Pago	Aristide	Paola	Antonella	
Asia	Not in House													Potential; Housemate		Nominated	
Andrea	Not in House	Exempt	Iván	Not eligible	Denver	Fernanda	Denver	Fernanda	Michele	Michele	Fabio	Licia	Antonella	Licia	Antonella	~~Antonella~~	13
Clizia	Fabio	Not eligible	Elisa	Not eligible	Antonio	Fernanda	Barbara	Not eligible	Barbara	Patrick	Patrick	Serena	Fabio	Fabio	Andrea	Ejected (Day 48)	8
Pago	Nominated	Rita	Antonio	Not eligible	Iván	Fernanda	Denver	Antonella; Carlotta	Denver	Michele	Fabio	Licia	Fabio	Fabio	Evicted (Day 45)		14
Serena	Guest		Not in House							Exempt		Fabio	Andrea	Evicted (Day 41)			6
Barbara	Not in House	Exempt	Elisa	Not eligible	Denver	Fernanda	Paola	Not eligible	Clizia	Carlotta	Adriana	~~Antonella~~	Walked (Day 34)				10
Michele	Nominated	Paola	Andrea	Not eligible	Andrea	Fernanda	Patrick	Licia	Andrea	Carlotta	Patrick	Evicted (Day 34)					9
Carlotta	Not in House	Exempt	Adriana	Not eligible	Iván	Nominated	Rita	Saved	Rita	Patrick	Walked (Day 27)						7
Rita	Fabio	Patrick	Elisa	Not eligible	Denver	Fernanda	Carlotta	Barbara	Adriana	Evicted (Day 24)							7
Iván	Not in House	Exempt	Andrea	Not eligible	Fabio	Nominated	Evicted (Day 17)										9
Pasquale	In Privèe	Not eligible	In Privèe	Nominated	Denver	Evicted (Day 13)											0
Sergio	In Privèe	Not eligible	In Privèe	Nominated	Evicted (Day 10)												0
Elisa	Not in House	Exempt	Clizia	Evicted (Day 10)													3
Salvo	In Privèe	Nominated	Ejected (Day 6)														0
Notes	1	2, 3, 4	5	6	7	8, 9, 10	11	12, 13		14	14, 15, 16	17, 18	19	20, 21	22, 23, 24	24, 25, 26	
Against public vote	Denver; Fabio; Michele; Pago; Paolo	Patrick; ~~Salvo~~	Andrea; Elisa	Pasquale; Patrick; Sergio	Denver; Pasquale; Patrick	Carlotta; Iván	Barbara; Fernanda; Patrick	Andrea; Patrick; Rita		Barbara; Carlotta; Michele; Patrick	Adriana; Barbara; Fabio; Michele	Licia; Serena	Fabio; Serena	Licia; Pago	Andrea; Antonella; Clizia; Paola	Asia; Fabio; Sara; Teresanna	
Ejected	none	Salvo	none													Clizia	
Walked	none										Carlotta	Barbara	none			Andrea	
Evicted	Fabio; 3 of 6 votes to evict	Eviction cancelled	Elisa; 30% to save	Sergio; 15% to save	Pasquale; 27% to save	Iván; 48% to save	Eviction cancelled	Rita; 28% to save		Michele; 7% to save	Michele; 10% to save	Serena; 42% to save	Serena; 38% to save	Pago; 47% to save	Eviction cancelled	Asia; 12% to save	
Saved	Denver; 2 of 6 votes Paolo; 1 of 6 votes Michele; 0 of 6 votes Pago; 0 of 6 votes	Eviction cancelled	Andrea; 70%	Patrick; 48% Pasquale; 37%	Denver; 41% Patrick; 32%	Carlotta; 52%	Eviction cancelled	Patrick; 39% Andrea; 33%		Patrick; 63% Carlotta; 19% Barbara; 11%	Adriana; 56% Fabio; 18% Barbara; 16%	Licia; 58%	Fabio; 62%	Licia; 53%	Eviction cancelled	Fabio; 38% Teresanna; 34% Sara; 16%	

=== Week 8 - Finale ===
	Week 8		Week 10	Week 11		Week 12			Week 13			Final					Nominations received
	to save	Nomination	Week 10	to save	Nomination	Week 12			Week 13			Final					Nominations received
Paola	Saved	Fabio	Licia	Sara to save	Licia	Antonio	Saved	Saved	Nominated	Finalist				Nominated	Nominated	Winner (Day 92)	5
Paolo	Fernanda to save	Fabio	Antonella	Patrick to save	Antonella	Sara	Saved	Antonio	Exempt	Denver	Finalist		Nominated	Finalist	Nominated	Runner-up (Day 92)	3
Sossio	Valeria to save	Fabio	Teresanna	Licia	Licia	Finalist		Denver to save	Licia	Finalist		Nominated	Finalist		Nominated	Third Place (Day 92)	1
Patrick	Adriana to save	Fabio	Antonella	Paola to save	Antonella	Antonio	Saved	Antonio	Exempt	Saved	Nominated	Finalist		Nominated	Fourth Place (Day 92)		9
Aristide	Licia to save	Fabio	Sossio	Antonio to save	Fernanda	Teresanna	Nominated	Antonio to save	Antonella	Finalist			Nominated	Fifth Place (Day 92)			7
Antonella	Saved	Aristide	Valeria	Denver to save	Licia	Antonio	Saved	Paola to save	Nominated	Exempt	Nominated	Nominated	Sixth Place (Day 92)				22
Denver	Paola to save	Fabio	Fabio	Aristide to save	Fernanda	Teresanna	Saved	Antonella to save	Exempt	Nominated	Nominated	Evicted (Day 92)					10
Teresanna	Saved	Exempt	Antonella	Valeria	Antonella	Sara	Aristide	Saved	Saved	Paolo	Evicted (Day 85)						16
Licia	Saved	Fabio	Antonella	Fernanda to save	Antonella	Paola	Saved	Teresanna to save	Nominated	Evicted (Day 85)							1
Antonio	Antonella to save	Fabio	Adriana	Valeria to save	Sara	Paola	Sara	Licia to save	Evicted (Day 85)								6
Sara	Not eligible	Nominated	Fabio	Saved	Fernanda	Antonio	Teresanna	Evicted (Day 78)									2
Fernanda	Saved	Fabio	Antonella	Paolo to save	Sara	Evicted (Day 78)											5
Adriana	Saved	Antonio	Antonio	Denver to save	Antonio	Walked (Day 72)											9
Valeria	Saved	Exempt	Antonella	Licia to save	Evicted (Day 71)												1
Fabio	Teresanna to save	Aristide	Adriana	Evicted (Day 71)													43
Asia	Not eligible	Nominated	Evicted (Day 64)														0
Andrea	Walked (Day 48)																13
Notes	27		28	29, 30		31, 32			33, 34								
Against public vote	Asia; Fabio; Sara		Antonella; Adriana; Fabio	Licia; Sossio; Teresanna; Valeria	Antonella; Fernanda; Licia	Antonio; Aristide; Sara; Teresanna		Antonio; Paolo; Patrick	Antonella; Licia; Paola	Denver; Paolo; Teresanna	Antonella; Denver; Patrick	Antonella; Sossio	Aristide; Paolo	Paola; Patrick	Paola; Paolo; Sossio	Paola; Paolo	
Walked	none			Adriana		none											
Evicted	Asia; 22% to save		Fabio; 29% to save	Valeria; 17% to be finalist	Fernanda; 21% to save	Sara; 19% to be finalist		Antonio; 8% to save	Licia; 22% to be finalist	Teresanna; 15% to be finalist	Denver; 24% to be finalist	Antonella; 46% to save	Aristide; 34% to save	Patrick; 48% to save	Sossio; 24% to win	Paolo; 44% to win	
Saved	Fabio; 42% Sara; 36%		Adriana; 39% Antonella; 32%	Sossio; 39% to be finalist	Licia; 45% Antonella; 34%	Aristide; 33% to be finalist		Paolo; 53% Patrick; 39%	Paola; 45% to be finalist	Paolo; 45% to be finalist	Patrick; 42% to be finalist Antonella; 34% to be finalist	Sossio; 54%	Paolo; 66%	Paola; 52%	Paola; 43% Paolo; 33%	Paola; 56% to win	
Saved	Fabio; 42% Sara; 36%		Adriana; 39% Antonella; 32%	Licia; 25% Teresanna; 19%	Licia; 45% Antonella; 34%	Teresanna; 27% Antonio; 21%		Paolo; 53% Patrick; 39%	Antonella; 33%	Denver; 40%	Patrick; 42% to be finalist Antonella; 34% to be finalist	Sossio; 54%	Paolo; 66%	Paola; 52%	Paola; 43% Paolo; 33%	Paola; 56% to win	

=== Note ===
- ^Note 1 : During the first live show, Alfonso announced the news to the housemates that Grande Fratello decided that a male housemate would leave the house. Only female housemates could vote for which male housemate they want to evict. Fabio received the most votes, he left the house immediately. In fact, he wasn't evicted and moved to the Privèe, but the housemates believed he was evicted.
- ^Note 2 : Fabio returned to the main house during the second live show.
- ^Note 3 : Only male housemates could nominate and the housemate that received the most votes would have power. Rita received the most votes and she had to nominate one of the four former housemates in the Privè. She nominated Patrick. The host Alfonso revealed that Patrick had to choose a housemate to face public vote with him from the Privèe. He chose Salvo.
- ^Note 4 : Salvo was ejected due to his male chauvinist and offensive sentences.
- ^Note 5 : On Day 8, housemates could only nominate one housemate of their own gender.
- ^Note 6 : The housemates in the Privèe had to face a public vote.
- ^Note 7 : On Day 10, only male housemates could be nominated. Out of the housemates with the most votes (Denver, Fabio and Iván), the housemates in the Privèe had to choose one to face off in the public vote. They chose Denver.
- ^Note 8 : Adriana, Andrea, Aristide, Barbara, Pago, Paolo and Rita were immune as they were voted as favourite of the week.
- ^Note 9 : Housemates were split into six pairs and they had to win immunity and a nomination power in a task. Antonio & Paola won the task over Carlotta & Denver and they had to nominate one of them; they chose Carlotta. Clizia & Michele won the task over Fabio & Fernanda and they nominated Fernanda. Antonella & Patrick won the task over Iván & Licia and they nominated Iván.
- ^Note 10 : The seven immuned housemates had to save one of the nominated housemates, with 6 to 1, they saved Fernanda.
- ^Note 11 : During Day 15 and 16, a surprise nomination was made. Some housemates made the nomination publicly while others have been in secret. Fernanda, the most voted housemate, was automatically nominated for eviction. The public vote was not to evict, instead, the housemate with the fewest votes would be the first nominated on Day 20. The public vote was cancelled because Barbara was evacuated for health reasons.
- ^Note 12 : The eight housemates with most votes in the favorite vote won immunity.
- ^Note 13 : Every immune housemate had to save a housemate one by one, the last housemate without being saved was nominated. When Carlotta and Patrick were the last ones remaining, Pago as the most voted housemate in the favorite vote, saved Carlota, which meant that Patrick was nominated.
- ^Note 14 : Adriana, Antonella, Antonio, Barbara, Fernanda, Licia, Pago and Paolo were immune since they are voted as the favorite of the week, and Serena also immune as the new housemate. But every privilege has a cost. For the nominations, the immune housemates would make the nominations in public, and the other housemates would make nominations in the confessional as usual. The public did not vote to save but the housemate received the least vote would be the first nominated on Day 27. Michele received the least vote, therefore being the first nominated for the next nomination, and face the public vote with Adriana, Barbara and Fabio.
- ^Note 15 : Carlotta decides to withdraw from the show for personal reasons.
- ^Note 16 : Andrea, Antonella, Antonio, Aristide, Clizia, Denver, Fernanda and Licia were immune since they are voted as the favorite of the week, and Serena also immune as the new housemate. For the nominations, the immune housemates would make the nominations in the confessional, and the other housemates would make nominations in public.
- ^Note 17 : Adriana, Andrea, Antonio, Clizia, Fernanda and Paolo were immune since they are voted as the favorite of the week. For the nominations, the immune housemates would make the nominations in the confessional, and the other housemates would make nominations in public. The public did not vote to save but the housemate received the least vote would be the first nominated on Day 38.
- ^Note 18 : After the nominations, Barbara revealed she wanted to withdraw from the show for personal reasons. Her nomination was therefore nullified. Antonella, who had voted for Barbara, was asked to make a second nomination.
- ^Note 19 : Antonio, Clizia, Denver, Fernanda, Paola and Paolo were immune since they are voted as the favorite of the week. For the nominations, the immune housemates would make the nominations in the confessional, and the other housemates would make nominations in public.
- ^Note 20 : Adriana, Andrea, Antonella, Antonio, Clizia, Denver, Fernanda and Patrick were immune since they are voted as the favorite of the week. For the nominations, the immune housemates would make the nominations in the confessional, and the other housemates would make nominations in public.
- ^Note 21 : Asia, Simona and Teresanna entered the house as potential housemates.
- ^Note 22 : Adriana, Aristide, Denver, Fernanda, Licia and Patrick were immune since they are voted as the favorite of the week. For the nominations, the immune housemates would make the nominations in the confessional, and the other housemates would make nominations in public. The public did not vote to save but the housemate received the least vote would be the first nominated on Day 48.
- ^Note 23 : The public vote involve housemates Andrea, Antonella, Clizia, and Paola was cancelled due to a disciplinary measure against Clizia who used unacceptable sentences.
- ^Note 24 : The public vote was cancelled on Day 47. And on Day 48, during the live show, Clizia was ejected due to use offensive sentences.
- ^Note 25 : Adriana, Antonio, Aristide, Fernanda, Licia and Patrick were immune since they are voted as the favorite of the week. For the nominations, the immune housemates would make the nominations in the confessional, and the other housemates would make nominations in public. The most voted housemate will face the public with all the potential housemates. The public did not vote to save but the housemate received the least vote would be the first nominated on Day 55.
- ^Note 26 : After the nominations, Andrea revealed that he wanted to withdraw from the show for personal reasons. His nomination was therefore nullified. Antonella and Paolo, who had voted for Andrea, was asked to make a second nomination.
- ^Note 27 : This round of nomination was divided into two parts. For the first part, male housemates had to save one female housemate each, the one was not be saved is nominated. In the second part, all housemates had to nominate one male housemate, the person receiving the most votes is nominated. Teresanna and Valeria did not nominate as Fabio is already the most voted and their nominations will not change anything.
- ^Note 28 : Week 9 is not present, as no live shows were broadcast during the week.
- ^Note 29 : A surprise nomination was made during the live show. Adriana and Antonella, the two housemates were saved from the eviction must choose a housemate to save, they chose Denver. Subsequently, Denver is asked to choose who he wanted to save from the nomination and starting a rescue chain. After the rescue chain, Sossio and Teresanna are nominated. However, the two nominated housemates were given the opportunity to choose a housemate each to be nominated, Teresanna chose Valeria and Sossio chose Licia. The winner of the public vote will be crowned the first finalist and the housemate received the least vote will be evicted.
- ^Note 30 : Adriana decides to withdraw from the show for personal reasons.
- ^Note 31 : A surprise nomination was made during the live show. All housemates except Sossio were at risk of eviction. They must nominate one housemate and the most voted housemate is Antonio. Antonio was asked to choose a housemate he wants to be nominated, and starting a rescue chain. Finally, Aristide, Sara and Teresanna were nominated with Antonio. The winner of the public vote will be crowned the second finalist and the housemate received the least vote will be evicted.
- ^Note 32 : For the round of nomination, the finalists Sossio and Aristide, were asked to start two rescue chains, where the housemate wasn't saved will be nominated, they are Paolo and Patrick. Paolo and Patrick were asked to choose a housemate to be nominated together with them, they chose Antonio.
- ^Note 33 : A surprise nomination was made during the live show. All housemates were at risk of eviction. Male housemates must decide among the female housemates (excluded Paola) who does not deserve to stay. Aristide and Sossio must decide on two housemates to be nominated, Aristide nominated Antonella and Sossio nominated Licia. The winner of the public vote will be crowned the third finalist and the housemate received the least vote will be evicted.
- ^Note 34 : For the second surprise nomination, Teresanna was nominated. Teresanna was asked who she wanted to challenge in nomination among the male housemates, she chose Paolo. Paolo was also asked who he wanted to challenge in nomination among the male housemates, he chose Denver. The winner of the public vote will be crowned the fourth finalist and the housemate received the least vote will be evicted.

== TV Ratings and guests ==
=== Live shows ===
Week	Episode	Date	Viewers	Share	Guest(s)
1	1	January 8, 2020	3,405,000	20.15%	Serena Enardu
1	2	January 10, 2020	2,922,000	16.76%	Serena Enardu, Imma Battaglia
2	3	January 15, 2020	3,402,000	20.23%	Paola Caruso
2	4	January 17, 2020	3,009,000	17.67%	Vittorio Cecchi Gori, Miriana Trevisan
3	5	January 20, 2020	3,111,000	18.54%	Valeria Marini
3	6	January 24, 2020	2,761,000	16.24%	Pietro Delle Piane
4	7	January 27, 2020	3,348,000	19.30%	Valeria Marini, Barbara Eboli
4	8	January 31, 2020	2,920,000	17.00%	Eleonora Giorgi
5	9	February 3, 2020	3,282,000	19.26%	Eva Robin's, Riccardo Fogli
6	10	February 10, 2020	3,292,000	19.32%	Pietro Delle Piane, Lory Del Santo, Pedro Settembre
6	11	February 14, 2020	3,058,000	18.70%	Roberto Parli
7	12	February 17, 2020	3,319,000	19.52%	Eleonora Giorgi, Massimo Ciavarro, Luca Zocchi
7	13	February 21, 2020	3,100,000	18.50%	Valeria Marini
8	14	February 24, 2020	3,480,000	18.25%	none
9	15	March 2, 2020	3,650,000	18.90%	none
10	16	March 11, 2020	3,743,000	19.00%	none
11	17	March 18, 2020	3,899,000	18.78%	none
12	18	March 25, 2020	4,048,000	19.10%	none
13	Semifinal	April 1, 2020	3,980,000	18.25%	none
14	Final	April 8, 2020	4,544,000	23.17%	Massimo Ciavarro, Pietro Delle Piane
Average			3,414,000	18.83%	
