= Stefano De Martino =

Italian television presenter and former dancer (born 1989)

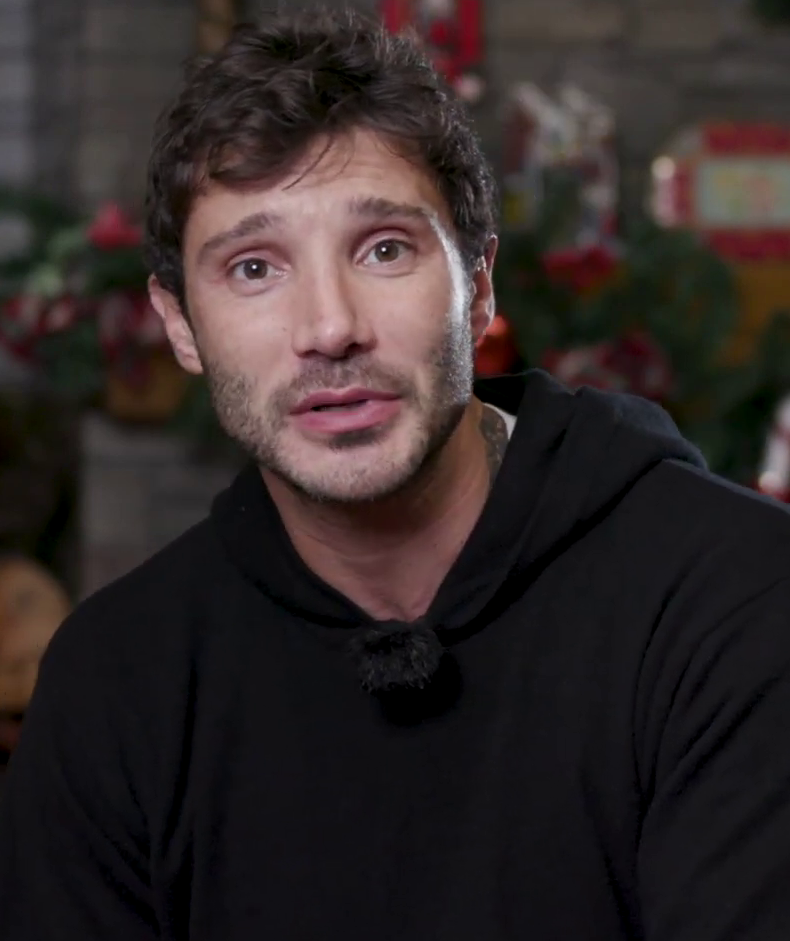
- De Martino in 2023
- Born: 3 October 1989 (age 36); Torre Annunziata, Naples, Italy
- Occupations: Television presenter; dancer
- Years active: 2007–present
- Spouse: Belén Rodríguez (m. 2013; div. 2024)
- Partner(s): Emma Marrone (2009–2012); Caroline Tronelli (2025–present)
- Children: 1

Stefano De Martino (born 3 October 1989), is an Italian television presenter and former dancer.

== Biography ==
Stefano De Martino took his first steps in the dance sector at the age of ten. In 2007, he managed to win a scholarship in New York City, at the Broadway Dance Center, thanks to which he has the opportunity to get in touch with modern and contemporary dance. After working in the Oltre Dance Company with the choreographer Macia Del Prete, in 2009, he participated as a competitor in the ninth edition of the talent show Amici di Maria De Filippi, on Canale 5, being eliminated in the semifinals and finishing first among the dancers. He won a contract with Complexions Contemporary Ballet, which allowed him to take part in a tour that took him to New Zealand, Australia and Hawaii.

Since 2010, he has been back to Amici di Maria De Filippi, this time as a professional dancer. Meanwhile, he works as a dance teacher and choreographer. In 2011, in Luciano Cannito's ballet Cassandra, she played the role of Aeneas alongside Rossella Brescia. In 2015, De Martino became a supporter and host of Amici di Maria De Filippi's daytime. In the same year, he was one of the protagonists of Pequeños gigantes, a program hosted by Belén Rodríguez aired at the beginning of 2016 on Canale 5, captaining the Gli incredibili team. Starting from 2016, he joined the cast of Selfie – Le cose cambiano, conducted by Simona Ventura on Canale 5, in which he is one of the mentors.

In 2018 he was chosen as correspondent of the thirteenth edition of the reality show broadcast on Canale 5 L'isola dei famosi, hosted by Alessia Marcuzzi.

Since 2019 he has hosted the comedy programme Made in Sud on Rai 2, supported by Fatima Trotta, with the participation of Elisabetta Gregoraci and Biagio Izzo. In the same year he always leads on Rai 2 with Belén Rodríguez the Notte della Taranta, the final of the Castrocaro Festival 2019 and, replacing Amadeus, he presents Tonight everything is possible, a program that he will also conduct in the following years always on Rai 2. In 2021, he returned to Amici di Maria De Filippi, with the role of judge, together with Stash and Emanuele Filiberto, to then be confirmed together with them also for the following edition.

Since December 2021 he has hosted his variety entitled Bar Stella in the late evening on Rai 2.

In the summer of 2022 he hosted Tim Summer Hits in prime time on Rai 2 together with Andrea Delogu.

On 4 June 2023 at the Stadio Diego Armando Maradona, he hosted Sarò con te – La festa del Napoli, a special for the Napoli championship winner broadcast on Rai 2 in prime time.

On 18 May 2024, De Martino was defined in the Novella 2000 special as the second sexiest man in Italy.

On 23 May 2024, De Martino signed a multi-year contract with RAI, due to the excellent results achieved in terms of audience success in his television broadcasts.

On 2 September 2024, he began hosting Affari tuoi, the Italian version of Deal or No Deal. The show was a great success with the public and critics, who appreciated De Martino as a host who entertained with lightness and naturalness.

De Martino is set to be the artistic director and main presenter of the Sanremo Music Festival 2027 and 2028.

== Personal life ==
In 2009, within the Amici di Maria De Filippi school, he began a relationship with Emma Marrone, which ended in 2012. In the same year, he became engaged to the Argentine showgirl Belén Rodríguez, marrying her on 20 September 2013 and with whom he has a son, Santiago, born on 9 April of the same year. The couple separated in 2015 and then got back together in 2019. The two broke up again in May 2020 and reunited again in 2022. The couple broke up permanently in 2023. However, De Martino maintains a friendly relationship with his ex-wife for the sake of his son.

In 2025, De Martino is romantically linked to Caroline Tronelli. De Martino and his girlfriend were also victims of a hack into her home's surveillance system, which captured videos of them in private, intimate moments. De Martino and Caroline Tronelli live together in his home in Rome.

== Filmography ==
=== Films ===
Year	Title	Role(s)	Notes
2020	Arctic Dogs	Speedy	Italian dub; voice role
2022	Il giorno più bello	Pier	Feature film debut
2023	Elemental	Wade Ripple	Italian dub; voice role

=== Television ===
Year	Title	Role(s)	Notes
2009–2010	Amici di Maria De Filippi	Contestant	5th place and winner of dance category (season 9)
2011–2018	Amici di Maria De Filippi	Professional dancer	Member of dance crew (seasons 11–17)
2013–2014	Quelli che... il Calcio	Opinionist	Variety show (season 21)
2015–2018	Amici di Maria De Filippi	Co-host	Only daytime episodes (seasons 15–17)
2016	Pequeños Gigantes	Coach	Talent show (season 1)
2016–2017	Selfie – Le cose cambiano	Mentor	Reality show
2018	L'isola dei famosi	Co-host	Reporter from the island (season 13)
2019–2020	Made in Sud	Presenter	Variety show (seasons 13–14)
2019–present	Stasera tutto è possibile	Presenter	Game show
2021	Che Dio ci aiuti	Himself	Episode: "Segreti di famiglia"
2021–2022	Amici di Maria De Filippi	Judge	Final stage only (seasons 20–21)
2021–2023	Bar Stella	Presenter	Variety show
2022	Tim Summer Hits	Presenter	Music show
2023	Sarò con te – La festa del Napoli	Presenter	Football show
2023	Il collegio	Narrator	Reality show
2023	Da Natale a Santo Stefano	Presenter	Variety show
2024–present	Affari tuoi	Presenter	Game show

=== Music videos ===
Year	Title	Artist(s)	Notes
2020	"Mal di testa"	Elodie, Fabri Fibra	

== Theatre ==
Year	Title	Director
2021-2022	Che coppia noi tre – The Show	Mario Porfito
2023	Meglio Stasera – Quasi One Man Show	Riccardo Cassini

== Radio ==
Year	Title	Radio
2019	The Voice of Radio 2	Rai Radio 2

== Commercials ==
Year	Title
2012	2Jewels
2013	WeChat
2018	Intimissimi
2021	Gutteridge
2025	Head & Shoulders
