= A Golden Boy =

- Directed by: Pupi Avati
- Written by: Pupi Avati; Tommaso Avati
- Starring: Riccardo Scamarcio; Sharon Stone
- Cinematography: Blasco Giurato
- Music by: Raphael Gualazzi
- Distributed by: 01 Distribution
- Release dates: 27 August 2014 (Montreal); 18 September 2014 (Italy)
- Running time: 102 minutes
- Country: Italy
- Language: Italian
- Box office: US$807,225 (Italy)

A Golden Boy (Italian: Un ragazzo d'oro) is a 2014 Italian comedy-drama film written and directed by Pupi Avati. It won the Best Screenplay Award at the 2014 Montreal World Film Festival.

== Plot ==
The film follows Davide (Riccardo Scamarcio), a copywriter whose father was a movie screenwriter. After his father's death, he leaves everything he has behind and moves to Rome, where he meets an actress-turned-publisher named Ludovica (Sharon Stone), who wants to release his father's autobiography.

== Cast ==
- Riccardo Scamarcio as Davide Bias
- Sharon Stone as Ludovica Stern
- Cristiana Capotondi as Silvia
- Giovanna Ralli as Davide's Mother
- Lucia Rossi as Beatrice
- Christian Stelluti as Walter Van Vooren
- Patrizio Pelizzi as Policeman
- Osvaldo Ruggieri as Beppe Masiero
- Tommaso Ragno as Ludovica's Husband
- Sandro Dori as Notaio
- Fabio Ferrari as Agente letterario
- Valeria Marini as Davide's Friend

== Release ==
The film screened at the Montreal World Film Festival on 27 August 2014 and was released on 18 September 2014 in Italian cinemas, where it grossed US$807,225.
