= TVA Vicenza =

Italian regional television channel of Veneto

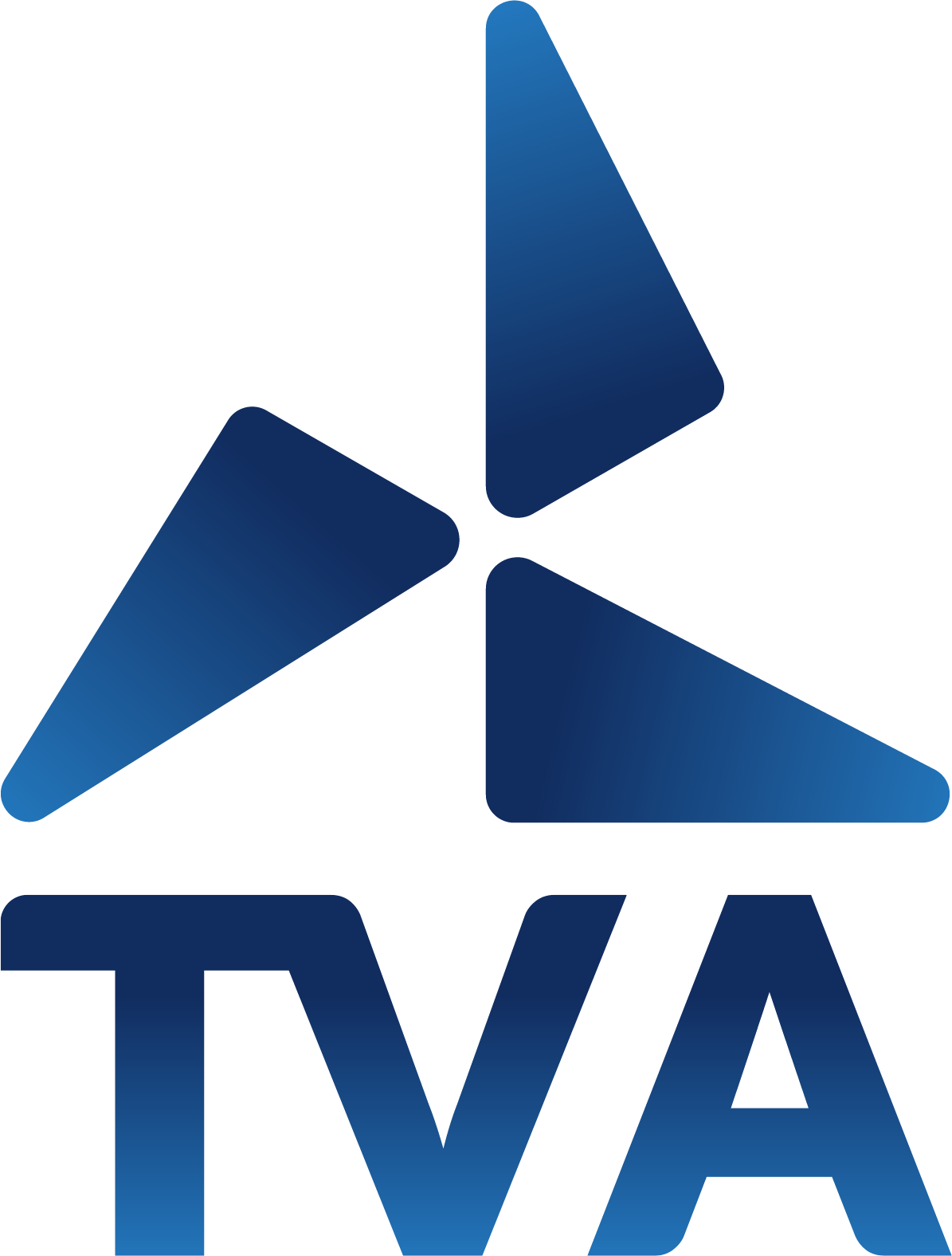
- Country: Italy
- Broadcast area: Veneto

Programming
- Language: Italian
- Picture format: 4:3 SDTV

Ownership
- Owner: Videomedia

History
- Launched: 1978

Links
- Website: http://www.tvavicenza.it/

Availability

Terrestrial
- Digital: LCN 10

TVA Vicenza is an Italian regional television channel of Veneto owned by Videomedia Spa group. It transmits a light entertainment program: movies, news and weather bulletins, political debates and sports on LCN 10.

Other channels of own group are Tva Sport, TVA News, Terra Veneta and TVA +1.

It is also broadcast Free To Air on Hot Bird satellite in Europe and Africa.

== Programming ==
- TvA Notizie (Vicenza News)
- Bassano Notizie (Bassano del Grappa news)
- TG Alto Vicentino (Thiene and Schio news)
- Ginnastica per la Terza Età (Gymnastics)
- Vicenza Calcio match
- Sportivamente Domenica (Sports Sunday)
- Rigorosamente calcio (football)
- Santa Messa
- Dolomiti Doc
- Super Pass
- Miss Vicenza
- Vicenza Splash
- Novastadio
