= Valeria Marini =

Italian actress and model

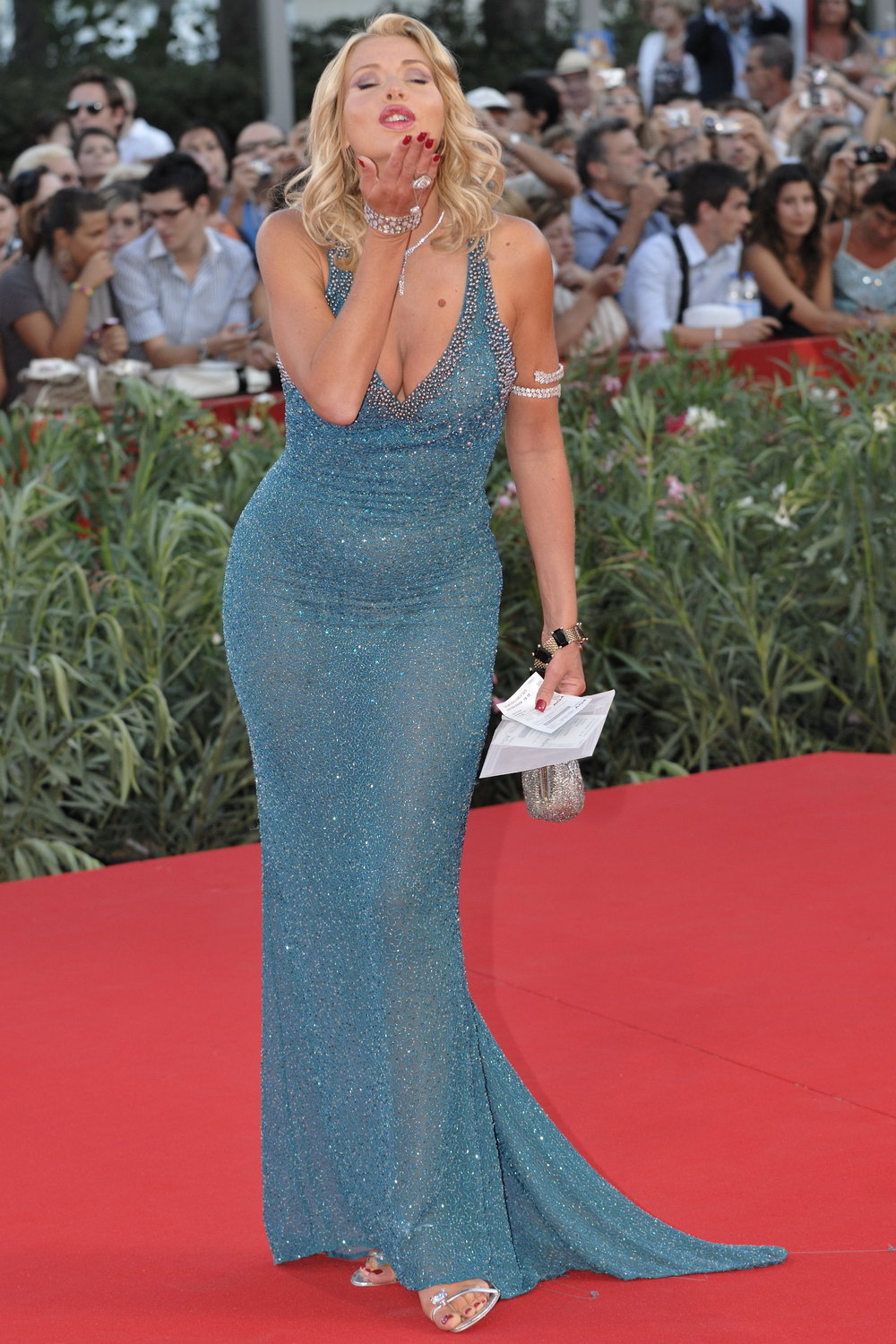
- Born: Valeria Virginia Laura Marini; 14 May 1967 (age 59); Rome, Italy
- Occupations: Television personality; businesswoman; actress; producer
- Years active: 1987–present
- Spouse: Giovanni Cottone (m. 2013; div. 2014)
- Website: www.valeriamarini.com

Valeria Virginia Laura Marini (born 14 May 1967) is an Italian television personality, actress and businesswoman.

== Life and career ==
Born in Rome to a Sardinian mother, Gianna Orrù, and a Roman father, Mario, Valeria Marini was raised in Cagliari. Her first cinematographic appearance was in 1987 in the film Cronaca nera. After this, she made her debut in theatre with the comedy I ragazzi irresistibili, in 1991. In 1992 she debuted in television with the show Luna di miele. It was in this programme that she was noticed by director Pierfrancesco Pingitore, who chose her to replace Pamela Prati in the Bagaglino spectaculars, annual series of theatre shows transformed into television variety programmes. She took part in several series of these, such as Bucce di banana, Champagne, Rose rosse, Viva le italiane, Miconsenta, Barbecue. After these performances, her fame grew in Italy; in 1997 she was nominated to present the Sanremo Festival with Mike Bongiorno and Piero Chiambretti.

Marini acted in several films, and in the 2000s, she began a career as a fashion designer. In 2006 she took part in the reality show Reality Circus. In 2010 she co-hosted the television programme I raccomandati, with Pupo, Emanuele Filiberto and Georgia Luzi. In the same year she acted as herself in a scene of Somewhere, directed by Sofia Coppola. In 2012, she took part as a contestant in the ninth season of L'isola dei Famosi, the Italian version of Survivor. In 2014, she acted in the film A Golden Boy, directed by Pupi Avati. In 2015, she took part as a contestant, coupled with Federico Degli Esposti, in the third season of Notti sul ghiaccio, the Italian version of Skating with Celebrities. In 2016, she participated to the first season of Grande Fratello VIP, the Italian version of Celebrity Big Brother. In 2018, she participated in the VIP episode of Alta Infedeltà with Daniele Marcheggiani and Chiara Condrò.

Marini is Catholic.

== Filmography ==
=== Film ===
Year	Title	Role	Notes
1991	Crack	Moira	
1992	Un orso chiamato Arturo	Vincent's Wife	
1992	Gole ruggenti	Sabrina	
1993	Abbronzatissimi 2 – Un anno dopo	Bea	
1996	Bambola	Mina "Bambola"	
1998	Incontri proibiti	Federica Pescatore	
2000	Corazón de bombón	Virginia	
2001	Buñuel y la mesa del rey Salomón	Ana María de Zayas	
2004	In questo mondo di ladri	Monica Puddu	
2010	Somewhere	Telegatto guest	Cameo appearance
2010	I Want to Be a Soldier	Teacher	Also producer
2012	Operazione vacanze	Nadia Escorti	
2012	E io non pago – L'Italia dei furbetti	Sonia	
2013	La mia mamma suona il rock	Jessica Morgan	Direct-to-video
2014	A Golden Boy	Davide's friend	
2016	C'è sempre un perché	Emma	Also producer
2018	Show Dogs	Persephone (voice)	Italian voice
2019	Cecchi Gori – Una famiglia italiana	Herself	Documentary
2024	Billie's Magic World	Ortensia	

=== Television ===
Year	Title	Role	Notes
1987	Cronaca nera	Lori's Friend	Television movie
1992	Un inviato molto speciale	Silvia	Episode: "Novantottesimo minuto"
1995	The Simpsons	Mindy Simmons (voice)	Italian dub; episode: "The Last Temptation of Homer"
1996	Sorellina e il principe del sogno	Spirit of the Spring	Two-parts television movie
1997	Sanremo Music Festival 1997	Herself / Co-host	Annual music festival
1997	Tutto in una notte	Herself / Co-host	Second edition
1999	Pepe Carvalho	Charo	Recurring role; 6 episodes
1999	The Seventh Scroll	Gina Valentino	Three-parts miniseries
2003	La palestra	Angela Solari	Television movie
2005	Music Farm	Herself / Opinionist	Season 2
2007	Scherzi a parte	Herself / Co-host	Season 10
2009	Piper: The Series	Doretta Lee	Main role
2011–2012	Così fan tutte	Valeria	2 episodes
2018–2019	Uomini e donne	Herself / Party planner	Season 23
2020	Siamo tutti Alberto Sordi?	Herself	Special
2025	The Bold and the Beautiful	Herself	Episode 9406
2026	Portobello	Moira Orfei	Episode: "Infallible"

=== Reality shows ===
Year	Title	Role	Result
2012	(Italy) L'Isola dei Famosi	Contestant	12th place
2016	(Italy) Grande Fratello VIP (season 1)	Contestant	3rd Place
2018	(Italy) Temptation Island VIP	Contestant	—N/a
2020	(Italy) Grande Fratello VIP (season 4)	Contestant	14th place
2021	(Spain) Supervivientes: Perdidos en Honduras (2021)	Contestant	12th place
2021–2022	(Italy) Grande Fratello VIP (season 6)	Contestant	20th place
2026	(Italy) Grande Fratello VIP (season 8)	Guest star	—N/a
2026	(Italy) Grande Fratello VIP (season 9)	Contestant	9th place

=== Producer ===
Year	Title	Role	Notes
2010	Dolls	Executive producer	Short film
2010	I Want to Be a Soldier	Co-producer	
2011	11-11-11	Producer	
2016	C'è sempre un perché	Producer	
2016	L'ultimo applauso	Producer	Short film
TBA	The Anatomist †	Executive producer	In pre-production

== Advertisements ==
- IP (1994–1996)
- 3 Italia (2005–2006)
- Puntoshop Channel (2007)
- Lambretta Pato (2008)
- Sansui (2009–2013)
- Akai (2012–2013)
- Tisanoreica (2015–2016)
- Acqua & Sapone (2018)

== Stage ==
- I ragazzi irresistibili, directed by Marco Parodi (1991)
- Nata ieri, directed by Giuseppe Patroni Griffi (1996)
- All'Angelo azzurro, directed by Giorgio Albertazzi (2000)
- Magnàmose tutto! - Donne che avete intelletto d'amore, directed by Pier Francesco Pingitore (2016-2017)
- La Presidente - Valeria Marini eletta al Quirinale, directed by Pier Francesco Pingitore (2020)

== Discography ==
=== Singles ===
- "Volare" (featuring Roberto Onofri) (2010)
- "Me gusta" (2019)
- "Boom" (2020)
- "Il mio Natale è una bomba" (featuring Nabuk and Kelly Joyce) (2020)
- "Baci stellari" (2022)
- "Divina" (2026)

=== Remixes ===
- "Besos stellari" (with J.Peralta) (2025)

=== Guest appearances ===
- "Mi manchi tu" (Nilla Pizzi featuring Valeria Marini) (2003)

== Books ==
- Lezioni intime (with Gianluca Lo Vetro), Milan, Cairo Editore, 2008, ISBN 978-88-6052-165-1
