= Communism and LGBTQ rights =

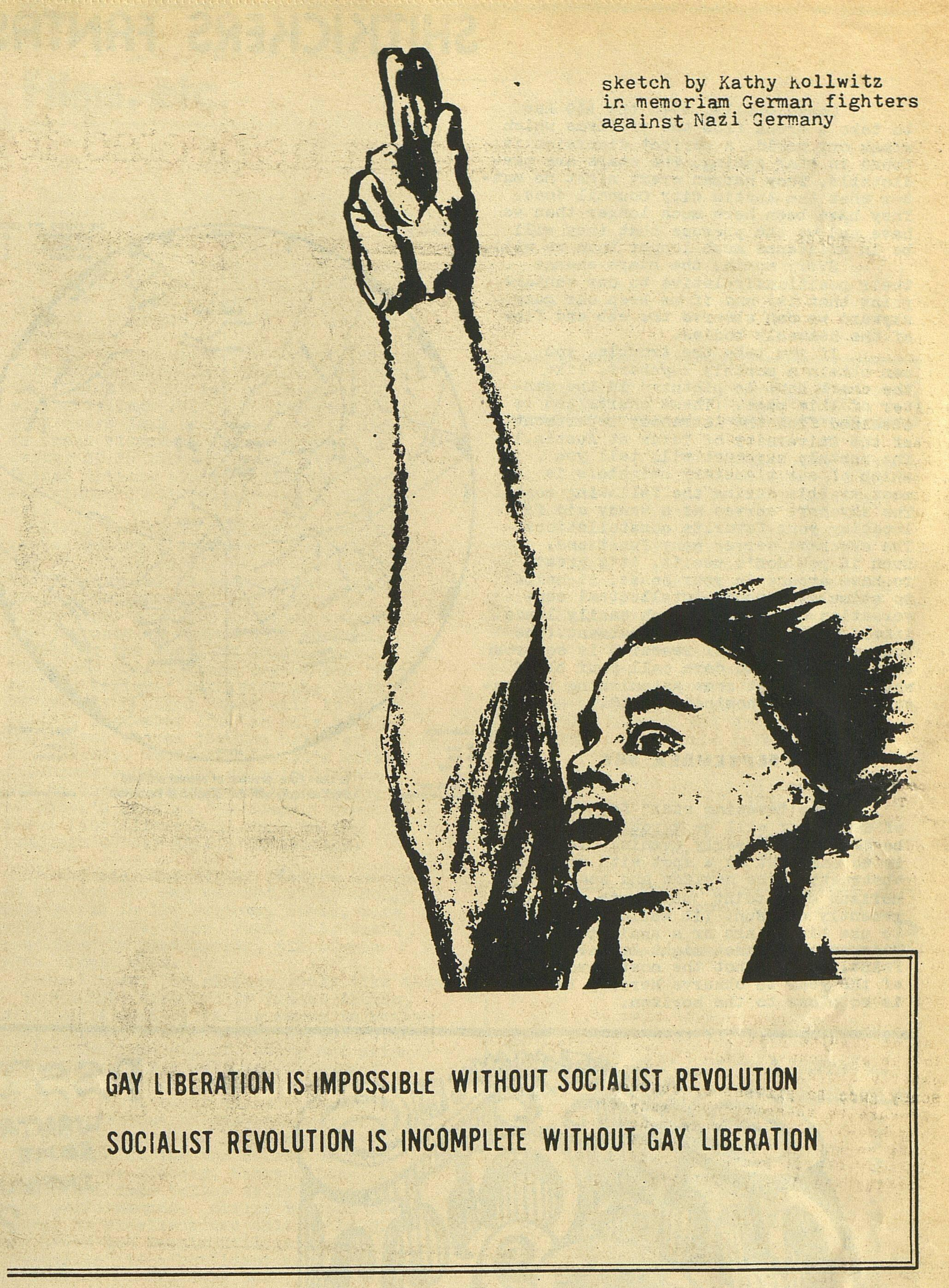
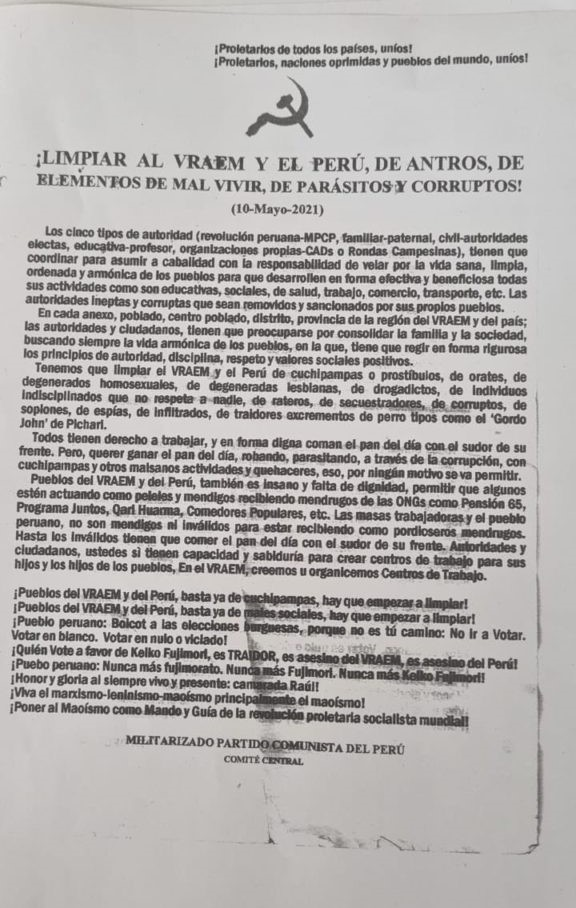
Left: New American Movement 1970s poster: "Gay liberation is impossible without socialist revolution. Socialist revolution is incomplete without gay liberation"
Right: Militarized Communist Party of Peru pamphlet, 2021: "We have to cleanse the VRAEM and Peru of brothels, of lunatics, of degenerate homosexuals, of degenerate lesbians, of drug addicts, ..."

Communist attitudes towards LGBTQ rights have evolved radically in the 21st century. In the 19th and 20th century, Communist parties and Marxist–Leninist states varied on LGBTQ rights; some Western and Eastern parties were among the first political parties to support LGBTQ rights, while others, especially the post-Lenin era Soviet Union, some of its Eastern Bloc members, and the Marxist–Leninist East Asian countries, harshly persecuted people of the LGBTQ community (especially gay men).

== History ==
=== Marxism ===
==== Early history ====
Communist leaders and intellectuals took many different positions on LGBTQ-rights issues. Karl Marx and Friedrich Engels said very little about sexuality. The Encyclopedia of Homosexuality, volume two, is unequivocal on Marx's and Engels' views of homosexuality, stating: "Marx and Engels were personally homophobic, as shown by an acerbic 1869 exchange of letters on Jean Baptista von Schweitzer, a German socialist rival." But Marx and Engels' exchanges about Schweitzer, though acerbic, are exclusively political in nature and never touch upon his supposed homosexuality, which is never mentioned. While Marx praised Schweitzer's strength and energy, both Marx and Engels considered him to be overly ambitious. Throughout his entire work, no quotation from Marx can be found concerning homosexuality. Engels, for his part, referred to homosexuality three or four times, all of them in mocking terms.

One of the first important politicians to speak out in favour of gay rights in public debates was the German Marxist and co-founder of the Social Democratic Party of Germany, August Bebel. Although Bebel personally considered same sex relationships to be "against nature", he was among the signatories of Magnus Hirschfeld's petition from the Scientific-Humanitarian Committee to overturn Paragraph 175 from the German penal code. The bill brought before the Reichstag in 1898 was supported only by a minority from the Social Democratic Party of Germany led by Bebel. Among other signatories was the Marxist theoretician Karl Kautsky.

In 1895, Marxist theorist Eduard Bernstein of the Social Democratic Party of Germany wrote a defense of Oscar Wilde (who had been on trial for homosexual behavior) in Die Neue Zeit, a materialist critique of social attitudes concerning the subject of sexuality. Among other arguments he made, he stated that the characterization of homosexuality as "unnatural" was inappropriate, preferring "not the norm" instead. During the Weimar Republic, the Communist Party of Germany joined with the Social Democrats in support of efforts to legalize private homosexual relations between consenting adults.

The situation for LGBTQ rights in the early Russian communist government was somewhat mixed. The Communist Party of Soviet Russia abolished all pre-1917 laws, including those related to sexuality. In 1917, the Soviet government also decriminalised homosexuality, and the subsequent Soviet criminal code in the 1920s left out the criminalization of non-commercial same-sex sexuality between consenting adults in private. The Sexual Revolution in Russia, a 1923 four-page pamphlet written by Grigorii Batkis, noted that Soviet law post-1917 regarded gay sexual practices to be part of normal human sexual behaviour, and did not criminalize them as all matters of sex were a private matter. However, outside the Russian SFSR and Ukrainian SSR, homosexuality remained a criminal offense in certain Soviet republics in the 1920s (particularly the Muslim-dominated Soviet Republics in Central Asia) and Soviet policy was often inconsistent in terms of pursuing homosexual rights and wider legal/social equality for homosexual people. Official Soviet policy on homosexuality in the 1920s also fluctuated: between legal and social tolerance of homosexuals and homosexuality to state attempts to classify homosexuality as a mental disorder. In 1933, Article 121 was added to the criminal code of the Soviet Union, which made male homosexuality a crime punishable by up to five years in prison with hard labor. The precise reason for Article 121 is in some dispute among historians. The few official government statements made about the law tended to confuse homosexuality with pedophilia and were tied to a belief that homosexuality was practiced only among fascists or the aristocracy. The law remained intact until after the dissolution of the Soviet Union; it was repealed in 1993 by the Russian Federation.

==== LGBTQ people and communist party membership ====
Gay men were sometimes denied membership or expelled from communist parties across the globe during the 20th century, as most communist parties followed the social precedents set by the USSR; however, this was not always the case in the Western world. Notable LGBTQ+ members of communist parties include:

- Karl-Günther Heimsoth (German politician) – member of both the Nazi Party and later the Communist Party of Germany (KPD). Continued feeding information to KPD's secret service after the Nazis seized power. Purged during the Night of the Long Knives.
- Harry Whyte (British Marxist and open critic of the criminalization of homosexuality in the Soviet Union in 1934, infamously dismissed as "an idiot and a degenerate" by Joseph Stalin in response to his letter arguing for the repeal of the law in question) – member of the Communist Party of Great Britain.
- Frida Kahlo (Mexican painter and political and social activist) – member of the Mexican Communist Party.
- Harry Hay (gay rights activist, labor advocate, Native American civil rights campaigner, Mattachine Society founder, co-founder of LA Gay Liberation Front and supporter of the North American Man/Boy Love Association, a pederasty advocacy group) – member of the Communist Party USA.
- Leslie Feinberg (Transgender and lesbian rights activist, self-described "anti-racist white, working-class, secular Jewish, transgender, lesbian, female, revolutionary communist.") – Member of Workers World Party
- Mark Ashton (founder of Lesbians and Gays Support the Miners and LGBTQ rights advocate) – member of the Communist Party of Great Britain.

==== Association of communism with homosexuality by anti-communists ====
The phrase "Sexual Bolshevism" originated in Weimar Germany in the 1920s by Pastor Ludwig Hoppe of Berlin as a more general term of approbation of licentiousness. When Nazi Germany came into being after the failures of the Weimar government, the Nazis used the term "sexual Bolshevism" to refer to perceived sexual degeneracy, in particular homosexuality.

==== Association of fascism with homosexuality by communists ====
In the early 1920s, Western communist party leaders propagated the view that the increase in homosexuality and the open discussion of homosexuality were caused by capitalism "in its death throes". In their view, homosexuality would vanish. After Hitler's seizure of power (the Machtergreifung), Marxist intellectuals correlated fascism with homosexuality.

==== Events leading to the association of communism with homosexuality ====
The advance of doctors, psychologists and social workers into the arena of human sexuality during the Weimar era (as well as the feminist movement) threw up a variety of conspiracy theories, especially amongst more conservative aspects of society, regarding communism and homosexuality. Any form of sexual revolution was derided as promiscuity and leading to a rise in sexually transmitted infections. The response of those who opposed "sexual Bolshevism" was to promote eugenics and family values. There are specific events which glbtq.com ("an encyclopedia of gay, lesbian, bisexual, transgender and queer culture") claims to have contributed to the linkage of communism with homosexuality in the United States as well:

For example, in 1948, Whittaker Chambers, an editor and writer at Time magazine and a former Communist Party member and courier in a Soviet spy ring infiltrating the American government, accused Alger Hiss, head of the Carnegie Endowment, of perjury and, implicitly, of Soviet espionage. The vast media coverage of the scandal hinted that Chambers had a crush on Hiss, establishing a link between Communism and homosexuality. Chambers was only too eager to strengthen this link, declaring to the FBI that his homosexual activities had stopped once he had left the Communist Party. In addition, the 1951 flight to the Soviet Union of gay British spies Guy Burgess and Donald Maclean also helped fuel the association of homosexuality and treason in the public imagination.

==== Cold War ====
During the height of the McCarthy era (in the late 1940s and early 1950s), American senator Joseph McCarthy viewed homosexuality and communism as threatening the "American way of life"; in both cases, "association with sickness and disease provided means of legitimating isolation from impressionable young people." Homosexuality was directly linked to security concerns, and more government employees were dismissed because of their sexual orientation than because they were left-wing or communist politically. George Chauncey noted that, "The specter of the invisible homosexual, like that of the invisible communist, haunted Cold War America," and homosexuality (and homosexuals) were constantly referred to not only as a disease, but also as an invasion, like the perceived danger of communism.

McCarthy often used accusations of homosexuality as a smear tactic in his anti-communist crusade, often combining the Second Red Scare with the lavender scare. On one occasion, he went so far as to announce to reporters, "If you want to be against McCarthy, boys, you've got to be either a Communist or a cocksucker." Some historians have argued that, in linking communism and homosexuality and psychological imbalance, McCarthy was employing guilt-by-association if evidence for communist activity was lacking.

Senator Kenneth Wherry similarly attempted to invoke a connection between homosexuality and anti-nationalism. He said in an interview with Max Lerner that "You can't hardly separate homosexuals from subversives." Later in that same interview, he drew the line between patriotic Americans and gay men: "But look Lerner, we're both Americans, aren't we? I say, let's get these fellows [closeted gay men in government positions] out of the government."

Connections between gay rights groups and radical leftists were not merely a figment of the imaginations of demagogues. The Mattachine Society, one of the earliest gay rights groups in the United States, was founded by Harry Hay, a former member of the Communist Party USA, who was kicked out of the gay rights group he'd founded for his ties to the party.

Famous ex-communist former Soviet agent Whittaker Chambers notably spent his time in the left-wing underground pursuing both homosexual and heterosexual affairs, but he kept his liaisons quiet since his communist associates despised homosexuality. Chambers later monogamously married the pacifist painter Esther Shemitz, working as a journalist and editor.

==== 21st century ====
Since the mid-1970s, most communist parties in the Western world have begun to adopt homosexual rights as part of their platform. Some communist parties such as the Communist Party of Greece and the Communist Party of the Russian Federation have rejected this move. The Communist Party of Greece voted against the Civil Partnerships Bill proposed by Syriza, responding that "with the formation of a socialist-communist society, a new type of partnership will undoubtedly be formed—a relatively stable heterosexual relationship and reproduction". Furthermore, the Communist Party of the Russian Federation and its leader Gennady Zyuganov supported the Russian gay propaganda law.

== LGBTQ rights by communist parties ==
=== Austria ===
The Communist Party of Austria (KPÖ) supports protections for LGBTQ+ people against discrimination, more rights for those in a registered partnership, greater public funds to tackle domestic violence towards LGBTQ+ people, better healthcare and healthcare access for LGBTQ+ people, placing protection categories for sexual orientation and gender identity in Austria's constitution, "unbureaucratic and free access" for a person changing their civil status and name, and non-discriminatory education and public administration systems.

=== Canada ===
The Communist Party of Canada has called to strengthen hate crime legislation against homophobia and transphobia, explicit protection of LGBTQ people from discrimination, the continued prohibition of conversion therapy, protection of intersex children from non-consensual surgery, and equality in blood donation. It has claimed that while the Liberal Party of Canada and Justin Trudeau talk in favor of LGBTQ rights, they have done little to improve the life of the LGBTQ community.

=== Cyprus ===
The Progressive Party of Working People (AKEL) supports the formal recognition of same-sex couples and same-sex marriage, and opposes discrimination based on sexual orientation and gender identity.

=== Eswatini ===
In June 2022, International Secretary of the Communist Party of Swaziland, Pius Vilakati, spoke out in favor of LGBTQ rights and the end of "colonial laws" used to repress LGBTQ people. In April 2023, the party protested in favor of LGBTQ rights.

=== France ===
Initially, the French Communist Party vilified homosexuality as "the rubbish of capitalism" in the 1970s, but it has since changed its stance to be in favor of LGBTQ rights. By the 1980s, it supported lowering the age of consent for same-sex relationships, and opposed attempts to re-penalize homosexuality. In 1998, the PCF voted in favour of the civil solidarity pact (PACS), civil unions, including for homosexual couples. The PCF supports both same-sex marriage and same-sex adoption. On 12 February 2013, PCF deputies voted in favour of same-sex marriage and adoption rights in the National Assembly, though the then PCF deputy Patrice Carvalho voted against.

=== Greece ===
In December 2015, the KKE voted against the Civil Partnerships Bill proposed by Syriza that would extend cohabitation agreements to same-sex couples. It also voted against Civil partnerships for heterosexual couples. The KKE responded, among other things:

The family is a social relationship, it is an institution for the protection of children, as it was formed in the context of today's society, capitalism. We also believe that civil marriage should be the only, obligatory form of marriage. And whoever wants, let him have the right to the corresponding religious ceremony. But you do not touch upon this bourgeois modernization that has taken place in other countries for years.

If the government wanted to introduce a less "bureaucratic" civil marriage, it could propose the necessary amendments to the Civil Code. There is no need for two legal regulations (civil marriage and cohabitation agreement) on the rights and obligations between spouses, the core of which is the potential reproduction, upbringing and upbringing of children.

Today, this is confirmed by the fact that the Cohabitation Agreement is extended in terms of obligations and rights of both parties, which essentially resembles marriage and especially by the fact that it extends to same-sex couples. Greece's condemnation by the European Court of Justice, cited by the government and the Report, was not a breach of any positive obligation imposed by the European Convention on Human Rights. But it was a negative discrimination against homosexual scales, but in the context of the institutionalization of the Cohabitation Pact. If there was no Cohabitation Pact for heterosexual couples, there would be no question of condemning Greece.

The aim of the bill is essentially the institutional recognition of same-sex couples, including – in a process – the acquisition of children by them. And there, is our disagreement.

Rights and obligations arise within marriage, which is the legal expression of the social relations of the family. It includes social protection of children, who are biologically the result of sexual relations between a man and a woman.

With the formation of a socialist-communist society, a new type of partnership will undoubtedly be formed—a relatively stable heterosexual relationship and reproduction.

One of the party's MPs, Giannis Gkiokas, made a speech further explaining the party's opposition to the Co-habitation Agreement. Gkiokas argued that homosexuality is a personal choice rooted in "chronic social problems arising out of capitalist development", and that same-sex cohabitation agreement would open the way to child adoption by same-sex couples which would "damage children and the reproductive process". He also affirmed KKE's support for the nuclear, heterosexual family as a stable institution of reproduction and raising children that cannot be undermined. Many democratic socialist parties, including Syriza, denounced the KKE's stance as bigotry.

However, the KKE also supports strengthening legislation to punish homophobic behavior, and has spoken against such discrimination, with Dimitris Koutsoumpas, the KKE's General Secretary, stating that:

unacceptable and condemnable discrimination and violence against our fellow human beings, based on their sexual orientation and other personal characteristics, are not addressed by cheap declarations of equality and words of sympathy, but by strengthening legislation against perpetrators of sexism, racism, and homophobia, with the full social support of those who suffer from such behaviors. A real shield against such discrimination is collectivism, the struggle for modern social rights for all people.

Additionally, Koutsoumpas has claimed that the KKE is the only party that has insisted in parliament to strengthen legislation against homophobia. He also stated that there should be "an equality of rights."

In 2024, the party voted against legalising gay marriage and same-sex adoption, claiming that "same-sex marriage means abolishing paternity-maternity".

The party published an article by Makis Papadopoulos, a member of the KKE's Central Committee, in its newspaper Rizospastis and 902 TV media outlet. In the article, Papadopoulos denounces gender transition and puberty blockers, comparing them to experiments of Nazi criminal Josef Mengele. The article also addresses the LGBT movement, arguing that it is a part of the agenda of Western capitalist and imperialist institutions, as well as billionaires like George Soros:

The promotion of gender identity, the right to continuous gender transition, postmodern positions of "individual self-determination", and the lumping together of people with different class positions, political views, and expressions of sexuality into a single "LGBTQ community" are official strategies of the EU and NATO.

A series of legislative measures, such as the European Parental Certificate (which recognizes the parental relationship of a child with three parents of the same biological sex) have already been implemented. Mass entertainment platforms, such as Netflix, bombard viewers with identical messages, and portray anyone who rejects them as reactionary, religious, and fascist.

In this direction, the self-proclaimed leadership of LGBTQI is also being utilized, funded, and supported by groups such as George Soros, JP Morgan, and General Electric. At the recent World Economic Forum in Davos, participants discussed how corporate diplomacy will promote the LGBT agenda.

The KKE supports the legal right of transgender people to change their gender in their legal documents.

=== India ===
In India, the Communist Party of India (Marxist) (CPI(M)) and the Communist Party of India support LGBTQ rights. For the Communist Party of India this includes supporting the legal recognition of same-sex marriage. The Students' Federation of India, Democratic Youth Federation of India, and All India Democratic Women's Association have actively supported LGBTQ rights. CPI(M) had called for amending Article 377 in 2009 and 2014, and supported an anti-discrimination bill covering LGBTQ people in 2019, becoming one of the first major political parties in India to do so. In 2024, the CPI(M) came out in favor of same-sex civil unions, as well as comprehensive anti-discrimination protections for LGBTQ people, reservation in educational institutions and employment, and measures against bullying, harassment, and violence against LGBTQ and gender non-conforming students, staff, and teachers in educational spaces.

=== Ireland ===
In Ireland and Northern Ireland, the Trotskyist People Before Profit party is in favor of LGBTQ+ equality, stating that they are in favor of equality in marriage and blood donation, as well as laws against homophobic and transphobic hate crimes, anti-bullying initiatives in school to protect LGBTQ+ students, LGBTQ+ awareness training at workplaces, and free gender care through an "Irish NHS" which would include psychotherapy, counselling, speech and language therapy, hormone therapy, hair removal, and gender reassignment surgery. It also supports extension of the Gender Recognition Act to those aged 16–18, and the addition of a third gender option in official forms.

=== Italy ===
In Italy, the Italian Communist Party initially adopted a repressive attitude towards its homosexual members: the most famous case is that of the expulsion of the poet and teacher Pier Paolo Pasolini, in 1949, with the official motivation of "moral unworthiness" (even today the minutes of the meeting in which it was decided are strangely absent even from the central archive), after he was accused and obscene acts in a public place, together with some boys, and corruption of minors, since one of them was under 16.

The situation improved significantly in the late 70s/early 80s, with the gay movement coming closer to the PCI and the PSI: these parties, along with their youth wings, as well as other communist parties such as Proletarian Democracy and the Proletarian Unity Party (and other organizations and parties, including ARCI, the CGIL and thr Radical Party), participated in Arcigay’s first public demonstration, in 1981, the "Homosexual Pride Celebration", to which the PCI also contributed with 1,000,000 lire.

In 1984 several homosexual activists (some of whom were already members of the PDUP) announced that they were joining the party, defining sexual liberation as a key component of the PCI’s alternative and of the construction of a socialist society. This move was supported by the Circle of Homosexual Culture Mario Mieli, as well as by Carlo Leoni and Giulia Rodano, provincial secretaries of the PCI’s Rome federation. Leoni, specifically, confirmed that the relationship between the PCI and the homosexual movement had become positive. In the following years, some openly gay PCI candidates, such as Nichi Vendola and Franco Grillini, would also run in elections.

With the dissolution of the PCI, the Communist Refoundation Party became the main communist party in Italy. With the PRC, the first gay mayor in Italy, Rosario Crocetta, the first gay head of a regional government, Nichi Vendola, and the first transgender member of parliament in Europe, Vladimir Luxuria, were elected. The party supports same-sex marriage and adoption, as well as anti-discrimination laws; in 1996, 1997, 2001 and 2006 the PRC proposed legislative amendments to combat homophobia.

=== Japan ===
The Japanese Communist Party (JCP) supports LGBTQ rights in Japan. This includes the party supporting the legalisation of same-sex marriage in Japan and backing anti-discrimination laws in regards to LGBTQ people.

=== Nepal ===
In January 2007, Nepalese minister Hisila Yami, a member of the Communist Party of Nepal (Maoist Centre), stated that the party adopted a platform to not "encourage homosexual behavior but not punish homosexuals either". Despite this, Maoists in Nepal have been accused of discriminatory attacks against members of the LGBTQ community. One such instance is the abduction and detention of two women accused of being lesbians. The women had previously been abducted earlier in 2006 by Maoists, who ordered them to join as Maoist soldiers to get a "straight life". Dev Gurung, another Maoist minister in Nepal, has also said that "under Soviet rule and when China was still very much a communist state, there were no homosexuals in the Soviet Union or China...Homosexuality is a product of capitalism. Under socialism this kind of problem doesn’t exist." Furthermore, the party has run a campaign against "social pollutants", including attacks against homosexuals. Amrita Thapa has openly stated that homosexuals are "polluting" society.However, since 2008, with the end of the Nepalese Civil War and the reconstruction, the Maoist Party has supported LGBT rights. Other strands of communism, such as that promoted by Sunil Babu Pant of the Communist Party of Nepal (Unified Marxist-Leninist), include openly out LGBTQ politicians and have led LGBTQ activism in the country. Pant's campaigning for LGBTQ rights led to the Supreme Court of Nepal giving legal recognition to Nepal's third gender in addition to decriminalising homosexuality and permitting same-sex marriage.

=== Norway ===
The Red Party supports the continuation of same-sex marriage in Norway as well as same-sex adoption. It also supports laws against discrimination towards LGBTQ people, the prohibition of conversion therapy, the strengthening of treatment for transgender people, and the addition of a third gender category in official documents. Furthermore, it supports counseling services for questions about sexual orientation or gender identity, the production of literature and films that represent queer people, and insight about LGBTQ people in education. It also supports the acceptance of queer refugees from countries where LGBTQ activity remains punishable.

=== Russia ===
The Communist Party of the Russian Federation remains socially conservative on LGBTQ rights, voting in favor of the anti-gay propaganda law and introducing legislation in 2016 to prohibit coming out as LGBT.

=== South Africa ===
The Economic Freedom Fighters protested against Uganda's Anti-Homosexuality Act, 2023, warning that President Yoweri Museveni would use it against political opponents. In July 2023, the party would invite Patrick Lumumba, a Kenyan professor, who spoke out in favor of Uganda's anti-LGBTQ laws to the party's 10th anniversary celebrations, sparking outrage from members of the LGBTQ community.

=== Philippines ===
The New People's Army, a Maoist insurgency within the Philippines, has also made several statements supporting equal rights of same-sex couples and gay individuals, performing the first same-sex marriage in the country and officially endorsing such legislation if they were to come to power. They also went further to express their support for same-sex relationships, and gays and lesbians were allowed to serve in their forces before those of the Philippines.

=== Portugal ===
The Portuguese Communist Party, described as socially conservative and anti-revisionist, despite voting in favor of same-sex marriage and supporting a law "to protect the human rights of transgender and homosexual people" and ban forced sexual orientation conversion, argues that issues such as women and LGBT rights carry little political relevance, and also expelled homosexual couples from its Avante! Festival, with party guards warning that "there are no faggot comrades" (Portuguese: não há camaradas maricas).

=== Turkey ===
The Communist Party of Turkey has come out in favor of LGBTQ rights, promising LGBTQ people "equal citizenship is in socialism!". Ekin Sönmez, a member of the Central Committee of the Communist Party of Turkey, in an interview with Liberation News, the newspaper of the Party for Socialism and Liberation, criticized the ruling AKP party for describing LGBTQ people as "perverted", and that it must be opposed. The communist-led municipality of Tunceli in 2021 decided to grant one extra day of leave to LGBTQ people on Pride Week. In 2023, the party made a statement denouncing the Turkish government's targeting and violence against LGBTQ people, stating that "this discrimination manifests itself as mobbing in the workplace, threats in the neighborhood, and brutal force in the hands of law enforcement". The Workers' Party of Turkey made a similar statement, claiming that the AKP wants to turn Turkey into a police state. In 2023, the Workers' Party also nominated three trans women for parliamentary seats: activists Esmeray Özadikti, Talya Aydin, and Niler Albayrak.

=== United Kingdom ===
The Communist Party of Great Britain (CPGB) viewed the working-class as male and heterosexually masculine. The accounts of gay party members show that homosexuality was widely seen as incompatible with a working-class identity during this era, despite Mark Ashton (founder of Lesbians and Gays Support the Miners) being General Secretary of the Young Communist League (the youth wing of the CPGB) "without compromising the politics of their sexuality".

An unofficial successor of the CPGB, the Communist Party of Great Britain (Marxist–Leninist) (CPGB-ML), has claimed that "LGBT ideology" is a "reactionary and anti-working class distraction", and stated that any member of the party who promotes it is liable to expulsion. It has claimed that gay rights is not a class issue, despite stating that racism and sexism were class issues, that the Western imperialist bourgeoisie use LGBTQ rights to oppress the Third World, and that supporters of "LGBT ideology" want "more than equal rights". Furthermore, it has called gender fluidity a "reactionary nightmare", and claimed that the terms "sex" and "gender" are synonyms. On the party's Twitter account, it has claimed the LGBTQ rights movement has become a "mainstay of monopoly capitalist assault on the working class" and almost a "NATO front".

=== United States ===
The Revolutionary Communist Party USA's previous policy that "struggle will be waged to eliminate [homosexuality] and reform homosexuals" ended in 2001. The RCP has since then strongly supported LGBTQ rights. Meanwhile, the American Socialist Workers Party (SWP) in the US released a memo stating that gay oppression had less "social weight" than black and women's struggles, and prohibited members from being involved in gay political organizations. They also believed that too close an association with gay liberation would give the SWP an "exotic image" and alienate it from the masses. Several non-governing communist parties have made statements supporting LGBTQ rights, such as the Communist Party USA, which supports extending marriage to same-sex couples and passing laws against discrimination based on one's sexual orientation. The League for the Revolutionary Party, a communist party based in New York City, issued a statement shortly after the passage of California's Proposition 8 condemning the amendment, reaffirming their support for same-sex marriage and expressing their views on how gay liberation is essential to the communist philosophy.

=== Elsewhere ===
Other communist parties present in Germany and other European countries have also officially endorsed LGBTQ rights, including the right to same-sex marriage, and some even have extensive LGBTQ platforms in their parties, such as the German Communist Party's "DKP Queer". The chairman of the Communist Party of Finland is openly homosexual, and the party also participates in the LGBTQ working group of the European Left Party.

== LGBTQ rights by Marxist–Leninist states ==
=== LGBTQ rights by current Marxist–Leninist states ===
As of 2026, Cuba is the only country ruled by a Marxist–Leninist government that legalized same-sex marriage, civil unions and same-sex adoption.

==== Cuba ====
Before the Cuban Revolution, Cuba had laws that criminalized homosexual men. Even so, male homosexuality was an important part of the prostitution industry for tourists and the US military, but associated with gambling and criminal activity.

After the Revolution, the position regarding homosexuality continued to be primarily negative, and some LGBTQ people chose to emigrate, since homosexuality was associated with US imperialism and perceived as "bourgeoisie". However, the law that criminalized homosexuality was repealed in 1979. Since the late 1990s, public antipathy towards LGBTQ people eased, having implemented several educational campaigns on LGBTQ issues, including the National Center for Sex Education (CENESEX), organization of pride parades every May to coincide with the International Day Against Homophobia, Biphobia and Transphobia, and marking the LGBTQ History Month.

The Communist Party of Cuba included the defense of LGBTQ rights in its regulations in 2013 and legalized same-sex marriage, civil unions, same-sex adoption and altruistic surrogacy, among other things, through amendments to the Cuban Constitution following the 2022 Cuban Family Code referendum.

=== LGBTQ rights in former Marxist-Leninist states ===
==== Albania ====
The People's Socialist Republic of Albania penalized same-sex sexual intercourse with long prison terms, bullying and ostracism. Article 137 of the Crimes against Societal Moral of the Penal Code stated that: "Pederasty is punishable for up to ten years of freedom privation". The word "pederasty" was used as a code word for sex between two consenting adults or sex between an adult and a child of any gender.

==== Benin ====
Same-sex sexual intercourse was always legal in the People's Republic of Benin. The People's Republic of Benin adopted a 1947 amendment to the Penal Code of 1877 under the Republic of Dahomey that fixed a general age limit of 13 for sex with a child of either gender, but penalized any act considered indecent or against nature if committed with a person of the same sex under 21: "Without prejudice to more severe penalties prescribed by the paragraphs that precede or by Articles 332 and 333 of this Code, shall be punished with imprisonment from six months to three years and a fine of 200 to 50,000 francs anyone who commits an indecent act or [an act] against nature with a minor ... of the same sex under 21 years old."

==== Bulgaria ====
The People's Republic of Bulgaria retained the penal code of the Kingdom of Bulgaria, which criminalized male same-sex sexual intercourse over 16 years of age with at least six months of imprisonment. The Penal Code of 13 March 1951 increased the penalty to up to three years in jail. The revised Penal Code of 1 May 1968 legalized male same-sex intercourse.

==== Congo ====
Same-sex sexual intercourse was always legal in the People's Republic of the Congo.

==== Czechoslovakia ====
In 1962, the Czechoslovak Socialist Republic decriminalized same-sex sexual intercourse after scientific research from Kurt Freund led to the conclusion that homosexual orientation cannot be changed.

==== East Germany ====
In the Soviet occupation zone of Germany, the development of law was not uniform. The government of Thuringia moderated Paragraphs 175 and 175a in a manner similar to that contemplated in the draft criminal code of 1925, while in the other states (Länder) the 1935 version of the statute remained in effect without changes. Although in 1946 the Committee for Law Examination of East Berlin specifically advised not to include § 175 StGB in a new criminal code, this recommendation had no consequences. The Provincial High Court in Halle (Oberlandesgericht Halle, or OLG Halle) decided for Saxony-Anhalt in 1948 that Paragraphs 175 and 175a were to be seen as injustice perpetrated by the Nazis, because a progressive juridical development had been broken off and even been reversed. Homosexual acts were to be tried only according to the laws of the Weimar Republic.

In 1950, one year after being reconstituted as the German Democratic Republic (GDR), the Berlin Appeal Court (Kammergericht Berlin) decided for all of East Germany to reinstate the validity of the old, pre-1935 form of Paragraph 175. However, in contrast to the earlier action of the OLG Halle, the new Paragraph 175a remained unchanged, because it was said to protect society against "socially harmful homosexual acts of qualified character". From 1953 to 1957, following the Uprising of 1953 in East Germany, the GDR government instituted a program of "moral reform" to build a solid foundation for the new socialist republic, in which masculinity and the traditional family were championed while homosexuality, seen to contravene "healthy mores of the working people", continued to be prosecuted under Paragraph 175. Same-sex sexual intercourse was "alternatively viewed as a remnant of bourgeois decadence, a sign of moral weakness, and a threat to the social and political health of the nation."

In 1954, the same court decided that Paragraph 175a, in contrast to Paragraph 175, did not presuppose acts tantamount to sexual intercourse. Lewdness (Unzucht) was defined as any act that is performed to arouse sexual excitement and "violates the moral sentiment of our workers". A revision of the criminal code in 1957 made it possible to put aside prosecution of an illegal action that represented no danger to socialist society because of the lack of consequences. This removed Paragraph 175 from the effective body of the law, because at the same time the East Berlin Court of Appeal (Kammergericht) decided that all punishments deriving from the old form of Paragraph 175 should be suspended due to the insignificance of the acts to which it had been applied. On this basis, homosexual acts between consenting adults ceased to be punished, beginning in the late 1950s.

In 1968, homosexuality was officially decriminalised in East Germany. Gay social clubs and groups were allowed to organize themselves freely, so long as they made tenuous links with Protestant Churches. This was because the official position of the ruling Socialist Unity Party of Germany was to outlaw discrimination on the basis of sexual orientation, but to otherwise ignore that LGBTQ relationships existed. On 1 July 1968, the GDR adopted its own code of criminal law. In it § 151 StGB-DDR provided for a sentence up to three years' imprisonment or probation for an adult (18 and over) who engaged in sexual acts with a youth (under 18) of the same sex. This law applied not only to men who have sex with boys but equally to women who have sex with girls. According to historian Heidi Minning, attempts by lesbians and gay men in East Germany to establish a visible community were "thwarted at every turn by the G.D.R. government and SED party." She writes:

Police force was used on numerous occasions to break up or prevent public gay and lesbian events. Centralized censorship prevented the presentation of homosexuality in print and electronic media, as well as the import of such materials.

In the late 1980s, the East German government opened a state-owned gay disco in Berlin. In 1987, the age of consent was equalized for same-sex intercourse in East Germany. On 11 August 1987 the Supreme Court of East Germany struck down a conviction under Paragraph 151 on the basis that "homosexuality, just like heterosexuality, represents a variant of sexual behavior. Homosexual people do therefore not stand outside socialist society, and the civil rights are warranted to them exactly as to all other citizens." One year later, the Volkskammer (the parliament of the GDR), in its fifth revision of the criminal code, brought the written law in line with what the court had ruled, striking Paragraph 151 without replacement. The act was passed into law 30 May 1989. This removed all specific reference to homosexuality from East German criminal law. In 1989, the German film titled Coming Out directed by Heiner Carow was exhibited on the night that the Berlin wall came down, and tells a story of an East German man coming to accept his own homosexuality, with much of it shot in the local gay bars. This was the only East German LGBTQ rights film.

==== Ethiopia ====
The Provisional Military Government of Socialist Ethiopia and People's Democratic Republic of Ethiopia adopted the previous Penal Code of 1957 of the Ethiopian Empire, which criminalizes anyone who "performs with another person of the same sex an act corresponding to the sexual act, or any other indecent act, is punishable with simple imprisonment."

==== Hungary ====
The Hungarian People's Republic adopted the penal code of the Kingdom of Hungary which punished male same-sex sexual intercourse with prison up to one year. In 1961, male same-sex sexual intercourse above the age of 20 was decriminalized. In 1978, a new penal code lowered the age of consent to the age of 18 years old.

==== Mongolia ====
In 1961, same-sex sexual intercourse was criminalized in the Mongolian People's Republic.

==== Poland ====
Same-sex sexual intercourse was always legal during the existence of the Republic of Poland and the Polish People's Republic. Nevertheless, Michel Foucault recounted that after his arrival in Poland in 1959 as the director of the French Cultural Center, the Polish secret police "trapped him by using a young [male] translator" and then "demanded his departure" from Poland, an example of honey trapping. In the 1980s, the government used homosexuality to blackmail homosexuals, and the police harassed gay men and lesbians. Many homosexual men were arrested in 1985 in Operation Hyacinth. The 2020 novel Swimming in the Dark by Tomasz Jedrowski presents a fictionalized depiction of LGBTQ life in the Polish People's Republic.

==== Romania ====
The Romanian People's Republic and the Socialist Republic of Romania adopted the Romanian Penal Code of 1937 from the Kingdom of Romania, which banned public "acts of sexual inversion committed between men or between women, if provoking public scandal". In 1948, this "public" homosexuality was considered by the courts to include all situations whatever public or private if "provoking scandal", thus homosexuality became de facto illegal. In the new Penal Code of the Romanian People's Republic, the old Article 431 was toughened with penalties up to a minimum of two years and a maximum of five years. In 1957 the "public scandal" provision was repealed and any consenting sexual intercourse between persons of the same sex was criminalized. After Nicolae Ceaușescu's rise to power, the basic code was again revised in 1968, introducing Article 200 and moving the infraction from the public domain into the private:

1. Sexual relations between persons of the same sex shall be punished with imprisonment from 1 to 5 years.
2. Act stipulated in paragraph 1, committed against a minor, against a person unable to defend himself or to express his will, or by coercion, shall be punished with imprisonment from 2 to 7 years.
3. If the act stipulated in paragraph 2 and 3 results in serious injury of physical integrity or health, the penalty is imprisonment from 3 to 10 years, and if results in the death or suicide of the victim, the penalty is imprisonment from 7 to 15 years.
4. Inciting or encouraging a person to practice the act stipulated in paragraph 1 shall be punished with imprisonment from 1 to 5 years.

Article 200 was useful to the Ceaușescu regime in that, since 1970, it could strengthen social control. These restrictions under the Penal Code were strictly unique to Romania among European countries. The restrictions only included relationships and those who considered themselves homosexual were not punished but were instead considered mentally ill.

==== Somalia ====
Under Article 409 of the Somali Penal Code introduced in 1973, sexual intercourse with a person of the same sex is punishable by imprisonment from three months to three years in the Somali Democratic Republic. An "act of lust" other than sexual intercourse is punishable by a prison term of two months to two years. Under Article 410 of the Somali Penal Code, an additional security measure may accompany sentences for homosexual acts, usually coming in the form of police surveillance to prevent "re-offending". Threats have been made that indicate that Somalia tolerates the executions of homosexuals.

==== Soviet Union ====
In November 1917, after the October Revolution, the Tsarist criminal code was abrogated by the Bolsheviks, thus legalizing same-sex sexual intercourse between consenting adults in the Russian Soviet Federative Socialist Republic and the later Ukrainian Soviet Socialist Republic (SSR). The Bolsheviks took an official position at this time that homosexuality was not harmful and was more a scientific concern than a legal concern. However, this policy was not uniform across all the Soviet Republics which emerged after 1922. The Armenian Soviet Socialist Republic, Byelorussian Soviet Socialist Republic, Russian Soviet Federative Socialist Republic, and Ukrainian SSR were all created with no laws criminalising same-sex sexual intercourse. In 1923, sexual intercourse between men became a criminal offense in the Azerbaijan Soviet Socialist Republic, punishable by up to five years in prison for consenting adults, or up to eight years if it involved force or threat.

In 1926, the Uzbek Soviet Socialist Republic criminalized male same-sex intercourse. In 1927, the Turkmen Soviet Socialist Republic criminalized male same-sex intercourse. Male same-sex intercourse was also illegal in the Bukharan People's Soviet Republic, the Georgian Soviet Socialist Republic, the Nakhichevan ASSR, and the Socialist Soviet Republic of Abkhazia. The Soviet Union sent delegates to the German Institute for Sexual Science, as well as to some international conferences on human sexuality including the World League for Sexual Reform, which expressed support for the legalization of adult, private, and consensual homosexual relations. According to the Scientific-Humanitarian Committee, which was affiliated with the institute, the Ministry of Health delegation was positively receptive to a film concerning the topic and considered it unworthy of scandal.

Soviet social policy in the 1920s regarding homosexuality and homosexual rights was mixed. On the one hand, homosexuality was legal in the Russian and Ukrainian Soviet Republics and certain political and civil rights in the Soviet Union were extended to homosexuals. On the other hand, there was increasing pressure from both within and outside the Soviet government to recriminalise homosexuality and to reinstate bans on homosexual intercourse. In the late 1920s, Soviet medical research increasingly came to classify homosexuality as a mental disease or as a remnant of bourgeois society. Relative Soviet tolerance for homosexuality and homosexual rights ended in the late 1920s – as Soviet society came increasingly under Stalinist control. In the 1930s, along with increased repression of political dissidents and non-Russian nationalities under Stalin, LGBTQ themes faced official government censorship, and a uniformly harsher policy across the entire Soviet Union. Homosexuality was officially labelled a disease. The official stance could be summarized in the article of the Great Soviet Encyclopedia of 1930 written by medical expert Sereisky:

Soviet legislation does not recognize so-called crimes against morality. Our laws proceed from the principle of protection of society and therefore countenance punishment only in those instances when juveniles and minors are the objects of homosexual interest ... while recognizing the incorrectness of homosexual development ... our society combines prophylactic and other therapeutic measures with all the necessary conditions for making the conflicts that afflict homosexuals as painless as possible and for resolving their typical estrangement from society within the collective

—Sereisky, Great Soviet Encyclopedia, 1930, p. 593

In 1934, the Soviet government recriminalised homosexuality in the Soviet Union. Mass arrests occurred in several cities in Russia, including Moscow, and many artists were arrested. On 7 March 1934, Article 121 was added to the criminal code, throughout the entire Soviet Union, which expressly prohibited only male same-sex sexual intercourse with up to five years of hard labor in prison. There were no criminal statutes regarding same-sex female sexual intercourse. During the Soviet period, Western observers believed that between 800 and 1,000 men were imprisoned each year under Article 121.

Some historians have noted that it was during this time that Soviet propaganda began to depict homosexuality as a sign of fascism, and that Article 121 may have been a simple political tool to use against dissidents, irrespective of their true sexual orientation, and to solidify Russian opposition to Nazi Germany, which had broken its treaty with Russia. More recently, a third possible reason for the anti-gay law has emerged from declassified Soviet documents and transcripts. Beyond expressed fears of a vast "counterrevolutionary" or fascist homosexual conspiracy, there were several high-profile arrests of Russian men accused of being pederasts. In 1933, 130 men "were accused of being 'pederasts' – adult males who have sex with boys. Since no records of men having sex with boys at that time are available, it is possible this term was used broadly and crudely to label homosexuality." Whatever the precise reason, homosexuality remained a serious criminal offense until it was repealed in 1993.

The Soviet government itself said very little publicly about the change in the law, and few people seemed to be aware that it existed. In 1934, the British Communist Harry Whyte wrote a long letter to Stalin condemning the law, and its prejudicial motivations. He laid out a Marxist position against the oppression of homosexuals, as a social minority, and compared homophobia to racism, xenophobia and sexism. While the letter was not formally replied to, Soviet cultural writer Maxim Gorky authored an article, published in both Pravda and Izvestia titled "Proletarian Humanism", that seemed to reject Whyte's arguments point by point. He rejected the notion that homosexuals were a social minority, and argued that the Soviet Union, governed by "manly proletariat", is obliged to persecute homosexuals to protect the youth from their corrupting effect. It is often said that he equated homosexuality with fascism. This is attributed to a quote from him, where Gorky said, "exterminate all homosexuals and fascism will vanish". He was actually quoting a popular saying, Gorky in fact said: "There is already a sarcastic saying: Destroy homosexuality and fascism will disappear." In 1936, Justice Commissar Nikolai Krylenko publicly stated that the anti-gay criminal law was aimed at the decadent and effete old ruling classes.

During Nikita Khrushchev's regime, the Khrushchev government believed that absent a criminal law against same-sex sexual intercourse, the sex between men that occurred in the prison environment would spread into the general population as they released many Stalin-era prisoners. Whereas the Stalin government conflated homosexuality with pedophilia, the Khrushchev government conflated homosexuality with the situational, sometimes forced, sex acts between male prisoners. In 1958, the Interior Ministry sent a secret memo to law enforcement ordering them to step up enforcement of the anti-gay criminal law. Yet, during the late 1950s – early 1960s, Aline Mosby, a foreign reporter in Russia at the time, attributed to the more liberal attitude of the Khrushchev government the fact that she saw some gay couples in public and that it was not uncommon to see men waiting outside of certain theaters looking for dates with male performers. A 1964 Soviet sex manual instructed: "With all the tricks at their disposal, homosexuals seek out and win the confidence of youngsters. Then they proceed to act. Do not under any circumstances allow them to touch you. Such people should be immediately reported to the administrative organs so that they can be removed from society."

Imprisonment for male same-sex sexual intercourse and government censorship of homosexuality and LGBTQ rights did not begin to slowly relax until the early 1970s. Venedikt Yerofeyev was permitted to include a brief interior monologue about homosexuality in Moscow to the End of the Line (1973). Perhaps the first public endorsement of LGBTQ rights since Stalin was a brief statement, critical of Article 121 and calling for its repeal, made in the Textbook of Soviet Criminal Law (1973). These references were characterized as being brief statements in a novel or textbook and were made by heterosexuals. Victor Sosnora was allowed to write about witnessing an elderly gay actor being brutally murdered in a Leningrad bar in The Flying Dutchman (1979), but the book was only allowed to be published in East Germany. When the author was gay and, in particular, if they were seen as supporting gay rights, the censors tended to be much harsher.

Russian gay author Yevgeny Kharitonov illegally circulated some gay fiction before he died of heart failure in 1981. Author Gennady Trifonov served four years of hard labor for circulating his gay poems and, upon his release, was allowed to write and publish only if he avoided depicting or making reference to homosexuality. In 1984, a group of Russian gay men met and attempted to organize an official gay rights organization, only to be quickly shut down by the KGB. It was not until later in the Glasnost period that public discussion was permitted about re-legalizing private, consensual adult same-sex sexual intercourse.

A poll conducted in 1989 reported that homosexuals were the most hated group in Russian society and that 30 percent of those polled felt that homosexuals should be liquidated. In a 1991 public opinion poll conducted in Chelyabinsk 30 percent of the respondents aged 16 to 30 years old felt that homosexuals should be "isolated from society", 5 percent felt they should be "liquidated", 60 percent had a "negative" attitude toward gay people and 5 percent labeled their sexual orientation "unfortunate". In 1989–1990 a Moscow gay rights organization led by Yevgeniya Debryanskaya was permitted to exist, with Roman Kalinin given permission to publish a gay newspaper, Tema. The precise number of persons prosecuted under Article 121 is unknown, with the first official information was released only in 1988, but it is believed to be about 1000 prosecuted a year. According to official data, the number of men convicted under Article 121 had been steadily decreasing during the Glasnost period. In 1987, 831 men were sentenced under Article 121; in 1989, 539; in 1990, 497; and in 1991, 462.

==== Yugoslavia ====
During World War II, Yugoslav Partisans whose homosexuality was revealed were subject to regular expulsion from their detachments, and in one known case a death sentence. Repression of LGBTQ people in Yugoslavia continued after World War II; LGBTQ people were labeled by communists as "enemies of the system" and "a product of insatiable capitalism" and were also prohibited from joining the Communist Party of Yugoslavia. When the Socialist Federal Republic of Yugoslavia was formed, it adopted the Yugoslav Criminal Code of 1929, a previous law of the Kingdom of Yugoslavia which forbade "lewdness against the order of nature" (anal intercourse) between people. The Socialist Federal Republic of Yugoslavia later restricted the offense in 1959 to only apply to male same-sex anal intercourse, but with the maximum sentence reduced from two years to one year imprisonment. Around five hundred male homosexuals have been imprisoned between 1951 and 1977, about half of which served probation, and some others served shorter sentences. For comparison, many Western European countries (such as West Germany and the United Kingdom) convicted several tens of thousands homosexuals during the same period.

In the 1970s, following the sexual revolution in much of Western Europe, the legal and social sphere of Yugoslavia started to liberalize towards LGBTQ rights. In 1973, the Croatian Medical Chamber removed homosexuality from its list of mental disorders. In 1974, Yugoslavia adopted a new federal constitution which resulted in the abolition of the federal penal code, allowing each socialist republic to create their own. SR Slovenia was the first republic to hold discussions in favor of decriminalizing homosexuality. The League of Communists of Yugoslavia held debates on the topic at least three times until 1976, when it requested decriminalization in all republics. In 1977, the Socialist Autonomous Province of Vojvodina, Socialist Republic of Croatia, Socialist Republic of Montenegro and Socialist Republic of Slovenia enacted their own individual penal codes and decriminalized male same-sex anal intercourse. Male same-sex anal intercourse remained illegal in the Socialist Republic of Bosnia and Herzegovina, Socialist Republic of Macedonia and the Socialist Republic of Serbia, excluding the Socialist Autonomous Province of Vojvodina (so including Socialist Autonomous Province of Kosovo).

In 1985, Toni Marošević became the first openly gay media person, and briefly hosted a radio show on Omladinski radio that dealt with marginal socio-political issues, before it was removed at request of right-wing newspapers Večernji list and Večernje novosti. He later revealed that he had been asked on several occasions by the League of Communists of Croatia to form an LGBTQ faction of the party. The first lesbian association (Lila initiative) in Croatia was formed in 1989, but ceased to exist a year later. In 1990, Vojvodina was reincorporated into the legal system of Serbia, and male same-sex anal intercourse once again become a criminal offense, until 1994.

== Notable LGBTQ communists ==
=== LGBTQ communists ===
Name	Lifetime	Nationality	Political affiliation(s)	Career	Sexual orientation	Gender identity
Mark Ashton	1960–1987	British	Communist Party of Great Britain	British activist	Gay	Male
Georgy Chicherin	1872–1936	Soviet (formally Russian)	Russian Communist Party (Bolsheviks)	Soviet politician	Gay	Male
Torstein Dahle	b. 1947	Norwegian	Rød Valgallianse, Rødt	Norwegian political and Economist	Gay	Male
Angela Davis	b. 1944	American	Communist Party USA	American activist	Lesbian	Female
Leslie Feinberg	1949–2014	American	Workers World Party	American activist	Lesbian	Female (transgender)
Júlio Fogaça	1907–1980	Portuguese	Portuguese Communist Party	Portuguese activist	Gay	Male
Harry Hay	1912–2002	American	Communist Party, USA	American activist	Gay	Male
Karl-Günther Heimsoth	1899-1934	German	Communist Party of Germany	German politician and physician	Gay	Male
Frida Kahlo	1907-1954	Mexican	Mexican Communist Party	Mexican artist and activist	Bisexual	Female
Vladimir Luxuria	b. 1965	Italian	Communist Refoundation Party	Italian politician	?	Female (transgender)
Sunil Pant	b. 1972	Nepalese	Communist Party of Nepal (United)	Nepalese politician	Gay	Male

==== LGBTQ former communists ====
Name	Lifetime	Nationality	Previous political affiliation(s)	Later political affiliation(s)	Career	Sexual orientation	Gender identity
Rosario Crocetta	b. 1951	Italian	Communist Refoundation Party; Italian Communist Party (until 1991)	Social democrat	Italian politician	Gay	Male
Tom Driberg	1905–1976	British	Communist Party of Great Britain	Social democrat	British politician	Gay	Male
Franco Grillini	b. 1955	Italian	Italian Communist Party	Social democrat	Italian politician	Gay	Male
Bayard Rustin	1912–1987	American	Social Democrats, USA	Neoconservative	American activist	Gay	Male

== See also ==
- Gay Left
- History of communism
- LGBTQ rights
- New Left
- Pink capitalism
- Queer anarchism
- Socialism and LGBTQ rights
- Towards a Gay Communism
