= Mieli =

Mieli may refer to:

- Paolo Mieli, an Italian journalist
- Mario Mieli, a leading figure in the Italian gay movement of the 1970s
- Valerio Mieli, a French-Italian director, writer, scenarist and photographer
- Félix Miélli Venerando (1937–2012), football player from Brazil
- Javier Milei Argentine economist, politician, and current president since December 2023
