= Licia Nunez =

Italian television and movie actress

- Born: Lucia Del Curatolo; 1 March 1978 (age 47); Barletta, Apulia, Italy

Lucia Del Curatolo (born 1 March 1978), known professionally as Licia Nunez, is an Italian television and movie actress.

== Selected filmography ==
- Alla fine della notte (2003)
- Balletto di guerra (2004)
- Goodbye Mama, (2011)
- Una vita in regalo (2004)
- Incantesimo 7-8-9 (2004-2006)
- Vivere (2004, 2007-2008)
- R.I.S. - Delitti imperfetti (2005)
- L'ultimo rigore 2 (2005)
- Coppie (2001)
- I carnefici (2001)
- Le tre rose di Eva (2012-2018)

=== TV ===
- Notti mondiali – Co-host with Marco Mazzocchi – Rai Uno (2006)
- Vivere da campioni – Co-host with Corrado Tedeschi – Rai Uno
- Eurogol – Co-host with Stefano Bizzotto – Rai Due
- Ballando con le Stelle – Reality show – Rai Uno (2009, season 5) – Contestant
- Grande Fratello VIP – Reality show – Canale 5 (2020, season 4) – Contestant
- L'Isola dei Famosi – Reality show – Canale 5 (2022, season 16) – Contestant

== Personal life ==
From 2006 to 2010, Licia was engaged to activist and politician Imma Battaglia.

Since 2018, she is engaged to entrepreneur Barbara Eboli.
