= Massimo Consoli =

Italian activist and writer

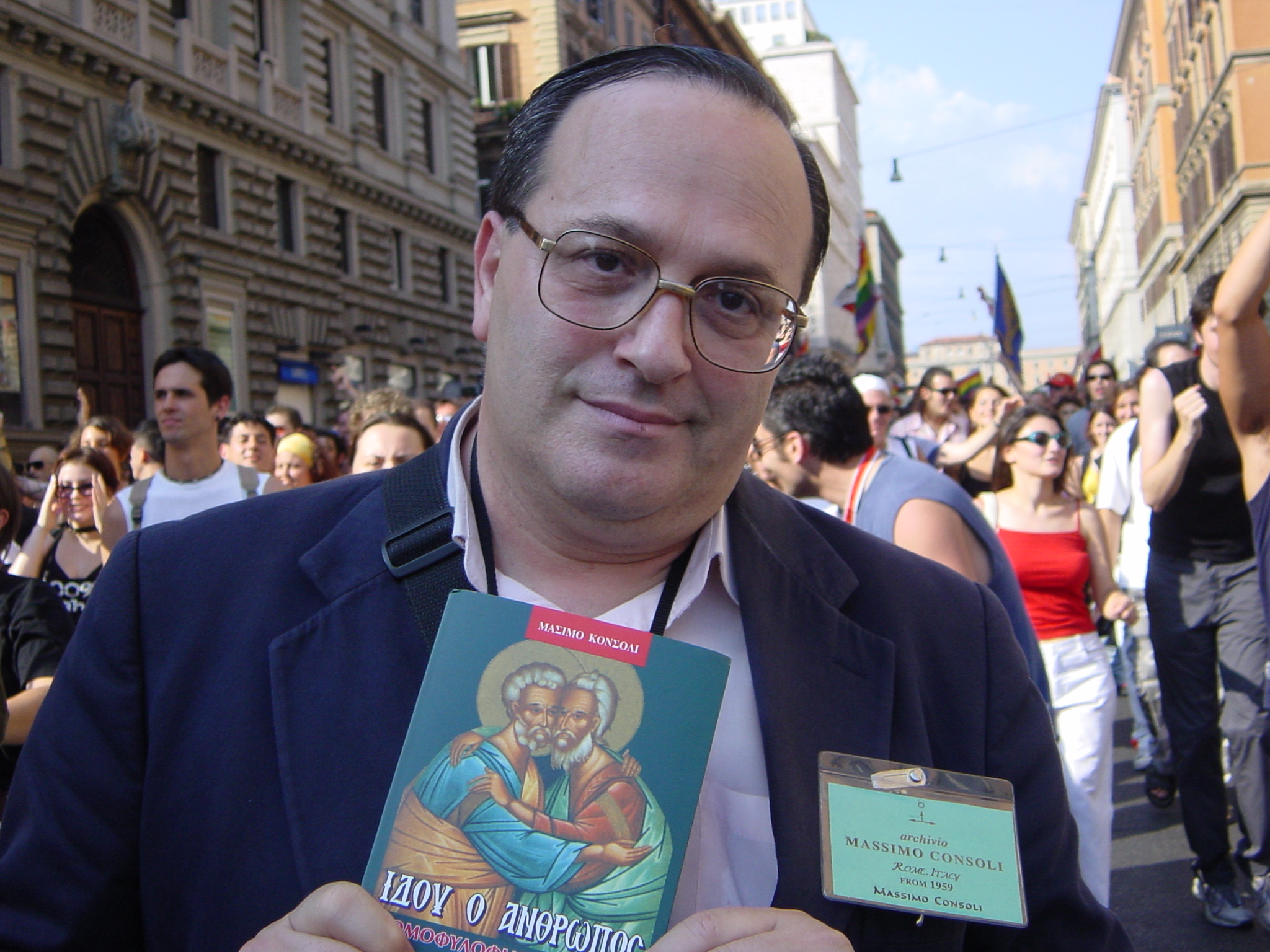
- Massimo Consoli 2002.
- Born: December 12, 1945; Rome, Italy
- Died: November 4, 2007 (aged 61); Rome, Italy
- Occupations: Writer, editor

Massimo Consoli (12 December 1945 – 4 November 2007) was known as "the father of the Italian gay movement". Besides being an activist, he was also an anarchist and a historian. In 1998, the State Archive of Italy's Ministry of Culture acquired his extensive archive of Italian gay activist history.

He wrote more than 30 books, mostly on gay issues, including works on German authors Karl Heinrich Ulrichs and Kurt Hiller. He was a close friend of American author and activist Vito Russo and Italian activist Mario Mieli.

He was also the editor of two publications: Rome Gay News and O-MPO: organo del Movimento politico degli omosessuali. These publications covered many aspects of gay political and social life in Italy beginning in 1975 through the 1990s, including multiple special issues on the AIDS crisis.

Consoli died on November 4, 2007, of colon cancer.
