= Imma Battaglia =

Italian politician and activist (born 1960)

- Immacolata Battaglia
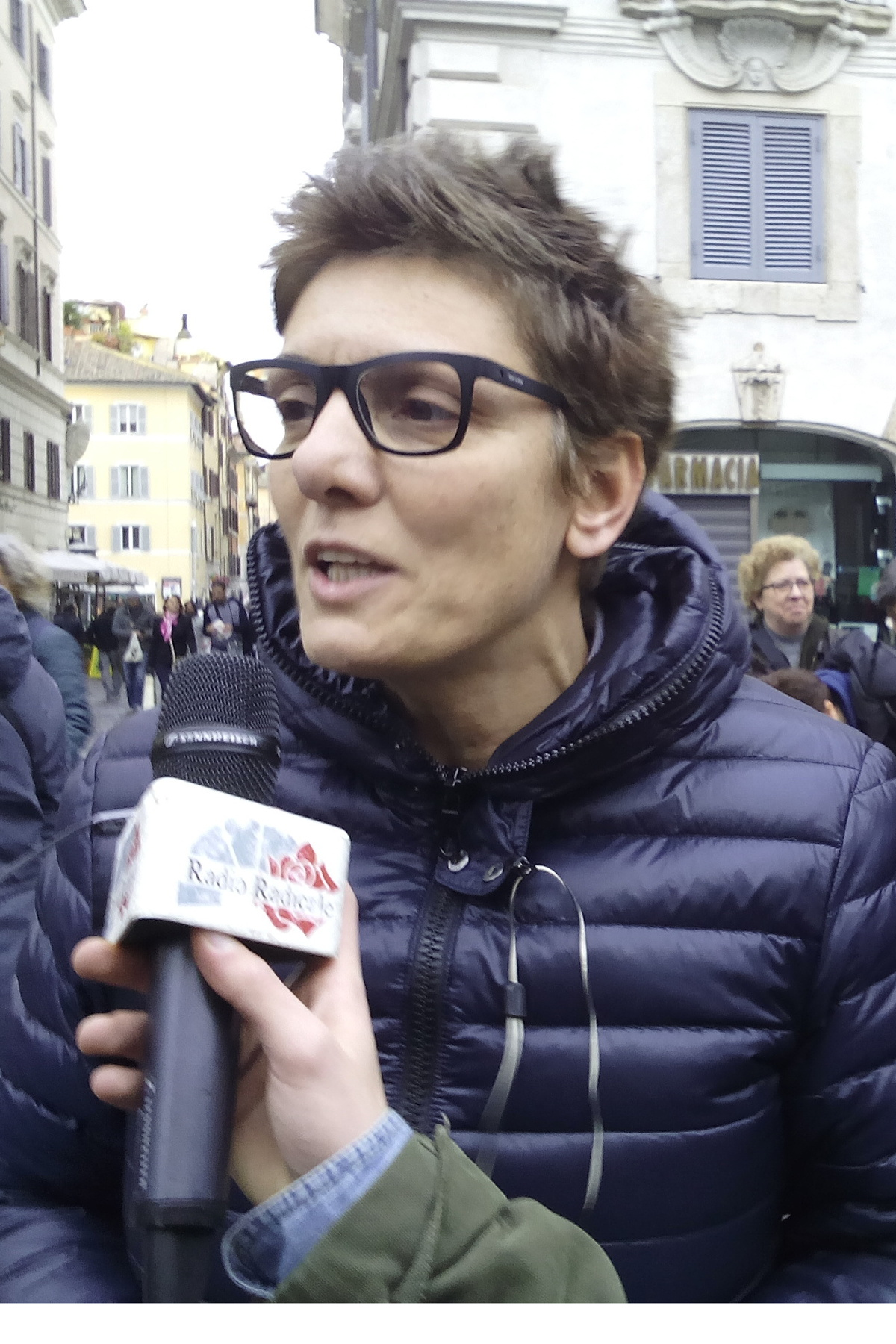
- Born: 28 March 1960 (age 65)
- Citizenship: Italian
- Known for: LGBT activism

Immacolata "Imma" Battaglia (born 28 March 1960) is an Italian left-wing politician and LGBT activist.

== Biography ==
Battaglia was born in Portici, province of Naples. From the late 1980s to 2000, she was a member of the Centre of Gay Culture "Mario Mieli" as well as its president for more than 5 years. As such she organised the first Gay Pride in Italy (Rome, 1994), and promoted Rome as a possible host for the 2000 World Gay Pride; her efforts were successful and the city was assigned the organisation of such event. The event created controversy in Italian politics because of the contemporaneity with the Great Jubilee of the Roman Catholic Church.

== Personal life ==
An open lesbian. Battaglia is currently engaged to Eva Grimaldi. She was previously engaged to Italian actress Licia Nunez.

== See also ==
- Nichi Vendola
- Left Ecology Freedom
