= Mario Mieli =

Italian activist (1952–1983)

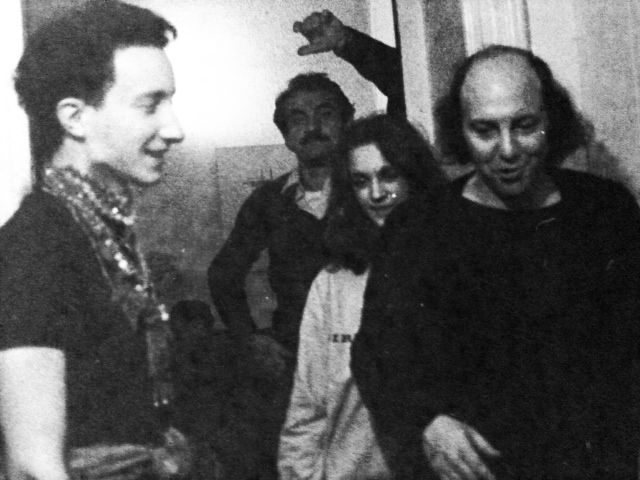
Mario Mieli (left)

Mario Mieli (21 May 1952 – 12 March 1983) was an Italian activist, writer, playwright, and queer theorist. He is considered one of the founders of the Italian homosexual movement and one of the leading theoreticians in Italian homosexual activism.

He is best known for his essay Elementi di critica omosessuale (Homosexuality and liberation: elements of a gay critique, reduced version, Gay Men's Press, London, 1980) published in its first edition by Einaudi, in Turin, in 1977, along with Towards a Gay Communism: Elements of a Homosexual Critique (published by Pluto Press, London, 2018) and was one of the founders of FUORI! (Fronte Unitario Omosessuale Rivoluzionario Italiano, United Italian Homosexual Revolutionary Front) and the Collettivo Autonomo di Milano (Autonomous Collective of Milan) in 1974. He died by suicide at the age of 30.

== Life ==
Mieli was born in Milan on May 21, 1952, into a large bourgeois family. He lived for the first sixteen years of his life on his family's house near Como. He moved back to Milan with his family in 1968. Politically precocious, he threw himself into the student uprising of that year, beginning a long commitment to revolutionary causes and establishing immediate contacts with the feminist movement.

In 1971, he went to London, where he took an active part in the London Gay Liberation Front. He spent intermittent time in London until 1975, while studying philosophy at the Università degli Studi di Milano. In April 1972, he, along with Massimo Consoli (1945–2007), Nicolino Tosoni (b. 1943), Angelo Pezzana (b. 1940) and the French writer Françoise d'Eaubonne (1920–2005), held the first homosexual demonstration in Italy at a congress of sexology in Sanremo. They protested against psychiatric condemnation of homosexual conduct and the use of aversion therapy to "convert" homosexuals.

In 1972, Mieli helped found the collective Fronte Unitario Omosessuale Rivoluzionario Italiano (Italian revolutionary homosexual united front). Better known by its acronym F.U.O.R.I! (Come out!), Italy's first major gay-rights group. Started in Turin in 1971, F.U.O.R.I! appeared almost simultaneously in Rome, Padua, Venice and Milan, where Mieli was an organizer. After the collective united with the Italian Radical Party, Mieli criticized the move as "counter-revolutionary," since he thought the gay movement should remain independent of political parties. He left the organization over political differences in 1974–75.

After 1974, Mieli continued his activism by organizing with Corrado Ievi the Collettivo Autonomo di Milano, from which the Collettivi Omosessuali Milanesi (COM) will develop, as well as a multiplicity of similar and autonomous experiences all over Italy in 1977. In 1976, Collettivo Autonomo di Milano and its theatrical group, Nostra Signora dei Fiori, staged his play La Traviata Norma. Ovvero: Vaffanculo... ebbene sì! (the title's numerous puns defy translation). This provocative production was successfully staged in Milan, Florence, and Rome. An in-your-face spectacle, it deliberately presented behavior designed to flout conventional, heterosexual norms.

A controversial personality, Mieli sometimes made a spectacle of himself. While some may have found this behavior outrageous, others knew him as a gentle person who enjoyed cross-dressing, capable of being very charming in private.

By 1976, Mieli had graduated and began revising for publication his doctoral thesis in moral philosophy. The revision was published as Elementi di critica omosessuale (Elements of a Homosexual Critique) in 1979. In it, Mieli contends that homosexual liberation is an integral and indispensable part of a much wider emancipation, and coined the term "educastration" ("education" added to "castration") to describe what he viewed as the process by which societal institutions systematically repress the individual's sexuality since childhood, defining it as the "mutilation" of "the potential polymorphous unfolding of Eros". The concept has been applied to topics including transgender studies and homosexuality. He combined Freud's ideas on "polymorphous perversion" (see Polymorphous perverse) with Marxist economics to argue that human liberation is possible only through a revolution allowing uninhibited pansexuality.

An English partial translation of the book was made by David Fernbach. The translation’s last chapter – "Towards a Gay Communism"—was excerpted as a political pamphlet and became Mieli’s most widely known work among English speakers. In 2019 was released a collection of his political writings titled La gaia critica. Politica e liberazione sessuale negli anni settanta. Scritti (1972–1983), accompanied by an extensive critical biography. and a French edition of the same

By 1981, Mieli became increasingly pessimistic about his cause. In 1983, he told friends about a forthcoming book titled Il risveglio dei Faraoni (The Awakening of the Pharaohs). It was to be an autobiographical novel. However, he expressed his dissatisfaction with the novel with many friends, and he felt he had failed to sustain the stylistic quality he was aiming at. In early March, he decided to stop publication of the book, writing in a letter to a friend that the book might inspire someone to "have his hide". In another letter dated March 11, he wrote, "My book will not be published by my free choice".

Mario Mieli took his life the following day, on March 12, 1983. He died at age 30 from asphyxiation by inhaling gas in his Milan apartment.

In 1994 an incomplete version of Il risveglio dei Faraoni was published by the Cooperativa Colibrì in Milan.

In 1983, an organization was founded in Rome to address the claims and protection of the civil rights of LGBTQ people, and it was named the Circle of Homosexual Culture Mario Mieli in his honour.

== Thought ==
=== Universal transsexualism ===
"I believe that the overcoming of the current separate and antithetical categories of sexuality will be transsexual, and that transsexuality will capture the one and multiple synthesis of the expressions of liberated Eros." If people were not conditioned from childhood by a certain type of society which, through what Mieli called "educastration," forces one to consider heterosexuality as "normality" and everything else as perversion, people would be "polysexual". The word "transsexual" employed by Mieli differs from today’s common understanding of the term; it indicates instead the erotic horizon to be conquered, experimented with, and developed, starting from Freud’s discovery of the perverse and polymorphic nature of human sexuality.

=== References to pederasty ===
In a conference given in November 27, 1981 at the Unione culturale Franco Antonicelli in Milan on the topic "Donna e società: il dibattito da F. Engels a W. Reich" (Woman and Society: the Debate from F. Engels to W. Reich), Mieli says:

"It is evident that if [ancient] Greece flowered so gorgeous it’s also because it was homosexual and was homosexual in the sunlight. For instance, great Greek heroes such as Harmodius and Aristogeiton were heroes of eros and aretè, not only important men for their virtuous behavior, but also for the love that bond them, especially in the aristocratic tradition."

(from the Archive of Unione Culturale Franco Antonicelli, Nov 27, 1981)

In two passages of his work Toward a Gay Communism: Elements of a Homosexual Critique, Mieli addresses a topic that in the 1970s was mobilized by various authors and that Mieli approaches as part of a critique of what he called educastration: pederasty. Although in the contemporary rediscovery of certain writings of the 1970s this theme has been purposely reframed by some groups as a justification for pedophilia, in Mieli’s work the conceptualization of pederastic desire is strictly linked to the emancipatory potential of the sexual revolution – to liberate both adults and children from the repression of the social norm made of compulsory heterosexuality and gender binarism. In his own deliberately provocative terms, pederasty becomes a revolutionary narrative:

"We revolutionary queers can see in the child not so much the Oedipus, or the future Oedipus, but the potentially free human being. We, yes, can love children. We can desire them erotically by responding to their craving for Eros, we can grasp with open face and open arms the intoxicating sensuality they lavish, we can make love to them. This is why pederasty is so harshly condemned: it addresses amorous messages to the child that society instead, through the family, traumatizes, educates, denies, lowering the Oedipal grid on its eroticism. The repressive heterosexual society forces the child into the latency period; but the latency period is but the deathly introduction to the lifespan of a latent "life". Pederasty, on the other hand, 'is an arrow of lust shot toward the fetus' (Francesco Ascoli)"

(Elements of Homosexual Criticism, 1977, p. 62, 2002)

Footnote 88 reads:

"By pederasty I mean the erotic desire of adults for children (of either sex) and sexual relations between adults and children. Pederasty (in the proper sense) and pedophilia are commonly used as synonyms."

(Elements of Homosexual Criticism, 1977 p. 62, 2002)

"I believe the most important task in introducing sexual education in school would be to eliminate the sense of guilt that still makes difficult everyone’s sexual life, including the apparently most disinhibited persons, and try to explain to children that every form of racism, whatever it is, is negative, explaining that Eros can be happily lived avoiding violence … This seems to me possible without speaking explicitly of perversions, homosexuality or other things."

(Archive Unione Culturale Franco Antonicelli, Nov 27, 1981)

== Works ==
=== Books ===
- Mieli, Mario (1977), Elementi di critica omosessuale (in Italian), G. Einaudi, ISBN 978-88-07-10339-1, OCLC 3670522
- Mieli, Mario (1980), Homosexuality and liberation: elements of a gay critique, Gay Men's Press, ISBN 978-0-907040-01-9
- Mieli, Mario (1994), Il risveglio dei Faraoni (in Italian), Edito per conto dell'Associazione culturale Centro d'iniziativa Luca Rossi dalla Cooperativa Colibri, ISBN 978-88-86345-01-9, OCLC 34221019
- Pezzana, Angelo (1976), La Politica del corpo (in Italian), Savelli, OCLC 3446167
- Mieli, Mario (2018), Towards a Gay Communism, Elements of a Homosexual Critique, Pluto Press (the first complete English edition of Elementi di critica omosessuale)
- Mieli, Mario (2019), La gaia critica. Politica e liberazione sessuale negli anni settanta. Scritti (1972–1983) (in Italian), Marsilio Editori
- Mieli, Mario (2025), Poems/Poesie, (Bilingual Italian/English), Agincourt Press

=== Plays ===
- Collettivo Nostra Signora dei Fiori (1977), La Traviata Norma : ovvero, Vaffanculo ... ebbene sì! (in Italian), L'erba voglio, OCLC 4005687
- Ciò detto, passo oltre
- Krakatoa

=== Pamphlets ===
- Towards a Gay Communism [London: pirate productions, 1980]
- Mieli, Mario; Santini, Francesco (1974), Comune futura (in Italian), OCLC 84592884
