= Towards a Gay Communism =

Book by Mario Mieli

- Author: Mario Mieli
- Language: Italian
- Publisher: Einaudi
- Publication date: 1977
- Pages: 336

Towards a Gay Communism: Elements of a Homosexual Critique (originally Elementi di critica omosessuale) is a book about queer theory and posthumanism by Italian writer Mario Mieli. It mainly discusses what Mieli describes as the "transexual revolution", which he says is the solution to overturn all artificial sexual binaries, capitalism, the commodification of queer identities and the patriarchy.

A 2018 English-language edition by Pluto Press includes a foreword by Tim Dean and an introduction by Massimo Prearo.

== Content ==
According to Mieli, human beings are born with multidirectional and nonlinear sexualities, which are usually amended later according to the interests of patriarchy and capitalism by a societal process he named educastration. This process, he wrote, produces the distinction between heterosexuals and homosexuals, men and women, as well as sexual repression that affects all of society.

Mieli wrote in the book that "We revolutionary queers see in the child not so much Oedipus, or the future Oedipus, as the potentially free human being. We do indeed love children. We are able to desire them erotically, in response to their own erotic wishes, and we can openly and with open arms grasp the rush of sensuality that they pour out and make love with them. That is why pedophilia is so strictly condemned. It sends messages of love to the child, whom society, through the family, seeks to traumatize, educastrate, and negate, imposing on the child's eroticism the Oedipal grid."

In order to overturn the binaries (including boundaries within homosexuality itself) imposed by patriarchical capitalism, as well as capitalism itself and the dominance of white men, Mieli stated that a communist "transexual" revolution would be necessary in order to archieve "the complete recognition and the concrete manifestation of erotic desire for persons of the other sex on the part of homosexual men and women, and the realization of a new gay way of loving between women and men". By "transexual", Mieli does not mean the mainstream definition of the concept, but instead the condition of going beyond ("trans") the artificial boundaries of gender, sex and sexualities.

The transexual revolution, Mieli wrote, would ultimately create "polysexual, transsexual human beings; better, instead of heterosexual and homosexuals[,] there will be human beings. The species will have (re)found itself". This new polymorphous human being, according to Mieli, would eliminate the man-woman binary, as well as other concepts of sexuality, such as coprophilia, transexuality and pedophilia.

== Reception ==
A review published in 2020 stated that the book is "an artifact of an era that seems as far away as the Middle Ages when it comes to radical politics and radical theory from a contemporary point of view". It described the book as "a breath of fresh air in the field of queer studies and queer theory".
