= Esmeray Özadikti =

Turkish activist (born 1973)

- Born: 1973 (age 52–53); Digor, Kars, Turkey
- Occupations: Actress, activist

Esmeray Zeynep Özatik (born 1973) is a theatre actress, playwright, columnist, and LGBT activist and politician.

When she Özatik was 15, she moved with her family from Kars to Istanbul. She took theatre, Turkish and Kurdish lessons at Mesopotamia Cultural Center. In 2009, she play in two different adaptations of Dario Fo's play The Rape, one of which included elements from her own experience of rape. She was a cast and crew member of the play Yazmadan Dökülenler, which was performed at Amargi Theatre and told the story of 13 women who migrated to a big city. She later went one to act in Cadının Bohçası, the story of a transsexual woman who moves from Kars to Istanbul, which was inspired by her own life. In its second part, Yırtık Bohça, she used a one-person narrative to what people with different sexual identities were exposed to. She later turned her life during her period of sex reassignment surgery into a play called Kestirmeden Hikayeler.

At the First Congress of the People's Democratic Party in October 2013, she succeeded in joining the Party Assembly.
