= Cinzia (graphic novel) =

Italian LGBT-themed graphic novel

- Date: 8 November 2018
- Publisher: BAO Publishing

Creative team
- Writer: Leo Ortolani
- Artist: Leo Ortolani

Original publication
- Language: Italian
- ISBN: 978-88-3273-155-2

Cinzia (Italian pronunciation: [ˈtʃintsja], CHEENTS-yah) is a 2018 dramedy graphic novel by Italian author Leo Ortolani, released via BAO Publishing.

Its protagonist is Cinzia Otherside, originally a character from Ortolani's comic book series Rat-Man; however, the story is set in an alternative continuity and Rat-Man himself does not appear in it.

== Background ==
Cinzia Otherside was first introduced as a character in Ortolani's comic book series Rat-Man. She was portrayed as a transsexual girl (formerly a mailman named Paul) with an unrequited love for Rat-Man. She later falls in love with one of Rat-Man's best friends, a policeman named Brakko, and marries him.

For the book Cinzia, Ortolani completely changed the story and setting in order to tell the story, struggles and feelings of a transsexual girl. In the preface to the book, Licia Troisi, a popular Italian author mostly known for her fantasy novels, recalled that in 2016 Ortolani said: "And then I'd have a story about Cinzia on my mind".

== Publication history ==
The French edition was published by Steinkis under the title Cynthia on 13 November 2019. A Spanish edition was published by Nuevo Nueve in October 2020 in collaboration with the Federación Estatal de Lesbianas, Gais, Trans y Bisexuales (FELGTB).

== Synopsis ==
Cinzia Otherside is a young transgender woman. One day, she meets a man named Thomas and falls in love with him. She then starts making plans to get to know him, and finally finds the way to do so: she will apply for a job in his same workplace. However, to prevent transphobia-driven rejection, she adopts a masculine look and thus gets to be hired, using her old name "Paul". Cinzia (as Paul) and Thomas become friends, until one day, "Paul" pretends to have a twin sister named Cinzia and introduces her to Thomas. Cinzia and Thomas then go out together and Thomas seems to be falling for her too... In the end, Thomas comes out as actually wanting "Paul", and when the chips are down, Cinzia will have to make an important decision: choosing her love, or the freedom to truly be herself.

== Reception ==
The book has received generally favorable reviews. Claudia Padalino of Mangaforever talks about an Ortolani «in true state of grace»; Spazio Bianco defined it as "a mature work in all respects, without flaws and in which there is no lack of passages of emotional intensity, laughter and music, but to which the author has added a profound reflection on the relationship between the will to assert oneself and the right to be so, between lived and perceived". This ability to mix comedy and commitment has also been underlined by Lega Nerd, according to whom Ortolani has managed to "condense all the essence of his way of writing, entertaining with the many gags always with a perfect rhythm [...] but striking our sensitivity at every turn of the page". BadTaste, on the other hand, while appreciating the work and the use of the comic and dramatic part, has found excessive space for some gags.

== Stage adaptation ==
The graphic novel was adapted into the musical comedy Io sono Cinzia - L'amore non si misura in centimetri, adapted and directed by Nicola Zavagli and staged by Teatri d'Imbarco at Lucca Comics & Games in 2019.
