= Il mondo di Stefi =

Italian animated series

- Also known as: Stefi's World
- Italian: Il Mondo di Stefi
- Based on: Stefi comics by Grazia Nidasio
- Screenplay by: Antonella Grassi; Matteo Valenti; Filippo Fiocchi; Alessandro Belli
- Directed by: Alessandro Belli
- Composer: Paolo Casalini
- Country of origin: Italy
- Original language: Italian
- No. of episodes: 52

Production
- Running time: 13 minutes
- Production companies: The Animation Band; Rai Fiction

Original release
- Network: Rai 3
- Release: 19 April 2008

Il Mondo di Stefi (Stefi's World) is an Italian animated series produced by Rai Fiction and The Animation Band and directed by Alessandro Belli. It premiered on Rai 3 on 19 April 2008 and was added to Rai Gulp in March 2009 and RaiSat Smash Girls in May 2009. It is based on the Stefi comics by Grazia Nidasio.

The show's pilot won the Pulcinella Award for Best Pilot at the Cartoons on the Bay festival in 2004. The show was nominated for the Pulcinella Award for Best Children's TV Series at the Cartoons On The Bay festival in 2008.

== Characters ==
- Stefi (voiced by Patrizia Salerno)
- Valentina (voiced by Maia Orienti)
- Cesare (voiced by Alberto Caneva)
- Ezio Maria (voiced by Fabrizio Mazzotta)
- Papa' (voiced by Nino D'Agata)
- Mamma (voiced by Greta Bonetti)
