= Elf Me =

2023 Italian Christmas adventure comedy film

- Promotional poster
- Directed by: Younuts
- Screenplay by: Gabriele Mainetti; Giovanni Gualdoni; Leonardo Ortolani; Marcello Cavalli; Tommaso Renzoni
- Story by: Gabriele Mainetti; Giovanni Gualdoni; Leonardo Ortolani; Marcello Cavalli
- Produced by: Gabriele Mainetti; Andrea Occhipinti; Mattia Guerra; Stefano Massenzi
- Starring: Lillo; Anna Foglietta; Federico Ielapi; Giorgio Pasotti; Caterina Guzzanti; Claudio Santamaria
- Cinematography: Leonardo Mirabilia
- Edited by: Francesco Galli
- Music by: Emanuele Bossi; Michele Braga; Gabriele Mainetti
- Production companies: Goon Films; Lucky Red
- Distributed by: Amazon Prime Video
- Release dates: 15 November 2023 (Rome); 24 November 2023 (Italy)
- Running time: 99 minutes
- Country: Italy
- Language: Italian
- Budget: €8 million

Elf Me is a 2023 Italian Christmas adventure comedy film directed by Younuts, and written by Gabriele Mainetti, Giovanni Gualdoni, Leonardo Ortolani, Marcello Cavalli, and Tommaso Renzoni, from a story by Mainetti, Gualdoni, Ortolani, and Cavalli. It stars Lillo as a Santa's elf who teams up with a bullied kid (Federico Ielapi) in order to save Christmas from a ruthless businessman (Claudio Santamaria). Anna Foglietta, Giorgio Pasotti, and Caterina Guzzanti also star.

The film premiered on 15 November 2023 in Italy, before being internationally released on Amazon Prime Video on 24 November 2023.

== Plot ==
Elia is a dyslexic 10-year-old boy living in a small village in the Alps with his mother Ivana, who's struggling to keep her toy shop afloat due to ciociaro toy manufacturer Ciocca's unfair competition. Trip is a Christmas elf who has been laid off from his job as Santa's helper at the North Pole because all the toys he builds end up having lethal malfunctions. After arriving in Elia's village to prove his worth, Trip is welcomed in his home and tries to cheer him up, but Elia is depressed from being bullied at school and his parents' recent divorce. In his own shambolic way, Trip manages to help Elia stand up to bullies and impress the girl he has a crush on. However, Ciocca kidnaps Trip, wanting to use his elvish powers to make his toys take over the world...

== Cast ==
- Lillo as Trip
- Anna Foglietta as Ivana
- Federico Ielapi as Elia
- Giorgio Pasotti as Elia's father
- Caterina Guzzanti as Brina
- Claudio Santamaria as Ciocca / Santa Claus
- Vincenzo Sebastiani as Fabio
- Giulietta Rebeggiani as Marta
- Francesco Liso as Vittorio
- Linda Zampaglione as Giada
- Orlando Mazza as Cesare
- Cosimo Mazza as Orazio
- Fabio Rovazzi as North Pole speaker
- Pietro Ubaldi as Buddy Buddy (voice)

== Production ==
=== Writing ===
The story for Elf Me was originally conceived by comic book author Giovanni Gualdoni, who narrated it to film director Gabriele Mainetti during the promotion of his They Call Me Jeeg (2015). Asked by Italian producers if he had any idea for a Christmas family film, Mainetti pitched them Elf Me. The plot originally revolved around a Christmas elf who built firearms and other makeshift weapons. The two reworked the story to make it less edgy and more family friendly, until Amazon Prime Video stepped in and greenlighted the project. Gualdoni and Mainetti co-wrote the story with comic book author Leo Ortolani, and Marcello Cavalli. Ortolani was called in to punch up the script because all the other writers were fans of Rat-Man, and mainly contributed to the North Pole toy factory scenes. All four of them also penned the screenplay, alongside Tommaso Renzoni.

=== Casting ===
Mainetti suggested Claudio Santamaria for the villain, since he had played hero roles in both They Call Me Jeeg and Freaks Out (2021). Santamaria came up with the idea of having his character speak with a ciociaro accent, and worked with costume designer Noemi Intino to develop the character.

=== Filming ===
As a producer, Mainetti stepped in for directing some scenes, such as the one with the giant duck and the one when Ciocca ties up Trip, and helped set up the sled chase scene.

== Release ==
Elf Me had its world premiere on 15 November 2023 in Rome, Italy. It was internationally released on Amazon Prime Video on 24 November 2023, dubbed in eight languages.

== See also ==
- List of Christmas films
- Santa Claus in film
