= Marco Mete =

Italian actor

- Born: 24 October 1955 (age 69); Rome, Italy
- Occupations: Actor; voice actor; theatre director; dialogue adapter; dubbing director
- Years active: 1978–present
- Spouse: Stefanella Marrama (divorced)
- Children: Andrea; Federica

Marco Mete (born 24 October 1955) is an Italian actor and voice actor.

== Biography ==
Trained at the Accademia Nazionale di Arte Drammatica Silvio D'Amico, he became a theatre actor, director and playwright, also performing onstage in the United States, Germany, and France, working with figures such as Geppy Gleijeses, Eugenio Bennato, Stefanella Marrama, Ennio Coltorti and Gennaro Cannavacciuolo. He debuted as a TV actor in the late '70s and his first role on the big screen was in the collective film Intolerance – Sguardi del cinema sull'intolleranza in 1996, playing the main character in a segment directed by Leonardo Celi, followed by the narrating character in the award-winning short-film Asino chi legge.

He is well known as a voice actor, having dubbed Roger Rabbit in both the Italian and Spanish edition of Who Framed Roger Rabbit, also voicing Woody Woodpecker in the Spanish dub; he has dubbed many animated characters in Italian, such as Daffy Duck from 1990 to 2022, Bonkers in the American series of the same name and in Raw Toonage, Chicken in Cow & Chicken, Adolf Hitler in Lupin III: The First, Narrator Smurf in The Smurfs and The Smurfs 2, Farmer Smurf in Smurfs: The Lost Village, Harv in Cars, Sir Miles Axlerod in Cars 2, Scuttle in The Little Mermaid and Jean-Bob in The Swan Princess. He also dubbed over the voices of Kevin Bacon, Bruce Willis, Robin Williams, Martin Lawrence, Kenneth Branagh, Aidan Quinn and other actors in Italian in some of their roles.

In 2019, Mete took part in the English dubbed version of Matteo Garrone's film Pinocchio, dubbing the Judge Gorilla, physically portrayed by Swiss actor Teco Celio.

== Filmography ==
- Un amore di Dostoevskij – TV miniseries (1978)
- Intolerance – Sguardi del cinema sull'intolleranza (1996)
- Asino chi legge – short film (1997)
- Movimenti (2004)
- Magic Sport - animated film (2006)
- Fratelli detective – TV series, 1st episode (2011)

== Theatre (incomplete list) ==
=== Actor ===
- Ammore e cummedia, written by Geppy Gleijeses and Marco Mete, music by Eugenio Bennato (1979)
- La piazza, written by Geppy Gleijeses and Marco Mete (1980)
- Anton Chekhov's The Seagull, directed by Ennio Coltorti (2019)
- Wilhelm Furtwängler. Processo all’Arte from a play by Ronald Harwood, directed by Ennio Coltorti (2020)

=== Director ===
- Ammore e cummedia, collective direction by Compagnia Napoli Nuova 77 (1979)
- Mahagonny, written by Bertolt Brecht and Kurt Weill, starring Margherita Buy (1985)
- Gilda, written by Marco Mete and Gennaro Cannavacciuolo (1988)
- Volare, concerto a Domenico Modugno, co-directed with Gennaro Cannavacciuolo (2015)

== Dubbing roles ==
=== Animation ===
- Roger Rabbit in Who Framed Roger Rabbit, Tummy Trouble, Trail Mix-Up (Italian and Spanish dubs), Roller Coaster Rabbit (Italian dub), Chip 'n Dale: Rescue Rangers (Spanish dub)
- Daffy Duck in Space Jam, Looney Tunes/Merrie Melodies (1995+ Italian dub), Gremlins 2: The New Batch, Box-Office Bunny (1997 Italian redub), The Bugs Bunny/Road Runner Movie (1999 Italian redub), The Looney Looney Looney Bugs Bunny Movie (1999 Italian redub), Tweety's High-Flying Adventure, Looney Tunes: Back in Action, Duck Dodgers, Looney Tunes: Rabbits Run, Bah, Humduck! A Looney Tunes Christmas, The Looney Tunes Show, Space Jam: A New Legacy
- Scuttle in The Little Mermaid, The Little Mermaid (TV series), The Little Mermaid II: Return to the Sea, Disney's House of Mouse, Once Upon a Studio (singing)
- Jean-Bob in The Swan Princess, The Swan Princess: Escape from Castle Mountain, The Swan Princess III: The Mystery of the Enchanted Treasure
- Coach Lawrence in Trollhunters: Tales of Arcadia, 3Below: Tales of Arcadia, Wizards: Tales of Arcadia
- Kenny McCormick and Conan O'Brien in South Park: Bigger, Longer & Uncut, Kenny McCormick in South Park (2000 Italian dub)
- Chicken in Cow & Chicken, I Am Weasel
- Bonkers in Raw Toonage, Bonkers
- Mr. Ray in Finding Nemo and Finding Dory
- Captain America in Ultimate Avengers, Ultimate Avengers 2
- General Warren R. Monger in Monsters vs. Aliens, Monsters vs Aliens: The Series
- Narrator Smurf in The Smurfs and The Smurfs 2
- Chazz Busby (episodes 19.15, 23.21), Robert Marlow, Robin Williams (episode 23.16) and Augustus Redfield in The Simpsons
- Juza and Ain in Fist of the North Star
- Mad Hatter and Mr. Toad in Once Upon a Studio
- Woody Woodpecker in Who Framed Roger Rabbit (Spanish dub)
- Bugs Bunny in Gremlins 2: The New Batch
- Petrie in The Land Before Time
- Marsupilami in Marsupilami
- Stanley in A Troll in Central Park
- Hubie in The Pebble and the Penguin
- Horror in The Pagemaster
- Alan Parrish in Jumanji
- Sykes in Shark Tale
- Ink Spot in The Little Mermaid: Ariel's Beginning
- Garfield/Garzooka in Garfield's Pet Force
- Norm in Norm of the North
- The Joker in Batman Ninja
- Bruce Willis in The Lego Movie 2: The Second Part
- Adolf Hitler in Lupin III: The First
- Narrator in Strange World
- Harv in Cars
- Miles Axlerod in Cars 2
- Farmer in Smurfs: The Lost Village
- Talking Cricket in Puss in Boots: The Last Wish
- Phil Coulson in Ultimate Spider-Man

=== Live-action ===
- Judge Gorilla in Pinocchio (2019, English dub)
- Data in Star Trek: The Next Generation, Star Trek: Picard, Star Trek: Insurrection, Star Trek: Nemesis
- Detective Sergeant Marcus Miles Burnett in Bad Boys, Bad Boys II, Bad Boys for Life
- Frank the Pug in Men in Black, Men in Black II, Men in Black: International
- Theodore Roosevelt in Night at the Museum, Night at the Museum: Battle of the Smithsonian, Night at the Museum: Secret of the Tomb
- Hercule Poirot in Murder on the Orient Express, Death on the Nile, A Haunting in Venice
- Brian Plummer in The Equalizer, The Equalizer 2
- Glenn Michaels in Out of Sight
- Wallace "Wally" Karew in See No Evil, Hear No Evil
- Donald Gennaro in Jurassic Park
- Eddie Dash in Another You
- Pick-Up Guy in Desperado
- Vladislav Dukhovich in The Hitman's Bodyguard
- Skinner in Tango & Cash
- John Murdoch in Dark City
- Burt Ramsey in Magnolia
- Mark in Jurassic Park III
- Quirinus Quirrell in Harry Potter and the Philosopher's Stone
- Larry Gomez in Kill Bill: Volume 2
- Mungo Tenant in The Walker
- Master Roshi in Dragonball Evolution
- Mateusz's father in Life Feels Good
- CASE in Interstellar
- Jean Pierre Napoleon in Muppets Most Wanted
- Oswaldo Mobray / Pete "English Pete" Hicox in The Hateful Eight
- Georges Dumont in Marguerite
- Pierre Révol in Heal the Living
- Simon Phoenix in Demolition Man
- Mose Jakande in Fast & Furious 7
- Atlee in Mission: Impossible – Rogue Nation
- Quaker Wells in Criminal
- Jack Teague in Pirates of the Caribbean: Dead Men Tell No Tales
- Atlan in Aquaman
- William Shakespeare in All Is True
- Kevin Bacon in The Guardians of the Galaxy Holiday Special
- Niels Bohr in Oppenheimer
- Bruce Davis in Haunted Mansion

=== Video games ===
- Daffy Duck in Bugs Bunny: Lost in Time, Bugs Bunny & Taz: Time Busters
- Mayor and Electric Guardian in Ghosthunter
- Tedworth in Epic Mickey 2: The Power of Two
