= Cannavacciuolo =

Cannavacciuolo (Italian: [kannavatˈtʃwɔːlo], Neapolitan: [kannavatˈtʃwoːlə]) is an Italian surname from Naples, originally referring to dishcloth makers or sellers. Notable people with the name include:

- Angelo Cannavacciuolo (born 1956), Italian writer and film director
- Antonino Cannavacciuolo (born 1975), Italian chef, restaurateur and television personality
- Gennaro Cannavacciuolo (1962–2022), Italian actor and singer
