= Pinocchio (2019 film) =

2019 Italian fantasy film by Matteo Garrone

- Official advertising poster
- Directed by: Matteo Garrone
- Screenplay by: Matteo Garrone; Massimo Ceccherini
- Based on: The Adventures of Pinocchio by Carlo Collodi
- Produced by: Matteo Garrone; Jean Labadie; Anne-Laure Labadie; Jeremy Thomas; Paolo Del Brocco
- Starring: Roberto Benigni; Federico Ielapi; Rocco Papaleo; Massimo Ceccherini; Marine Vacth; Gigi Proietti
- Cinematography: Nicolaj Brüel
- Edited by: Marco Spoletini
- Music by: Dario Marianelli
- Production companies: Archimede Film; Rai Cinema; Le Pacte; Recorded Picture Company
- Distributed by: 01 Distribution (Italy); Amazon Prime Video (France); Vertigo Films (United Kingdom)
- Release date: 19 December 2019 (Italy)
- Running time: 125 minutes
- Countries: Italy; France; United Kingdom
- Language: Italian
- Budget: €11 million ($13.2 million)
- Box office: $30.4 million

Pinocchio is a 2019 fantasy film, co-written, directed, and co-produced by Matteo Garrone, based on the 1883 book The Adventures of Pinocchio by Italian author Carlo Collodi. The film stars child actor Federico Ielapi as the title character, Roberto Benigni as Geppetto, (Note: Benigni previously directed and starred in the 2002 adaptation of Pinocchio as the title character.) Gigi Proietti as Mangiafuoco, Rocco Papaleo (Note: Papaleo previously voiced Mangiafuoco in the 2012 animated adaptation of Pinocchio.) and Massimo Ceccherini as the Cat and the Fox, and Marine Vacth as the adult Fairy with Turquoise Hair. This was the final film featuring Proietti to be released before his death in November 2020.

Pinocchio was a passion project for Garrone, who drew the first storyboard of the story at the age of six. Unlike previous Garrone films, which were directed towards adults, Pinocchio is aimed at both adults and children. Most characters, including Pinocchio himself, were created through prosthetic make-up rather than CGI. It is the second live-action Pinocchio film to star Benigni, following the 2002 adaptation, and the second to star Papaleo, after the 2012 animated film.

The film was released in Italy on 19 December 2019, by 01 Distribution, and grossed €15 million domestically, making it the highest-grossing film of the Christmas week in Italy, as well as Garrone's highest-grossing film domestically (beating 2008's Gomorrah), and the sixth highest-grossing film in Italy of 2019–20. An English-dubbed version was released by Vertigo Films in the United Kingdom and Ireland on 14 August 2020, and by Roadside Attractions in the United States and Canada on 25 December 2020.

Pinocchio was met with positive reviews from critics. It received 15 nominations at the 2020 David di Donatello Awards, winning five: Best Production Design, Best Costumes, Best Make-up, Best Hairstyling, and Best Visual Effects. It was also nominated for nine Nastro d'Argento Awards, winning six, plus a special mention, and two Academy Award nominations for Best Costume Design and Best Makeup and Hairstyling at the 93rd Academy Awards.

== Plot ==
A poor Italian carpenter named Geppetto decides to build a wooden puppet to tour the country and earn him a living. He names it "Pinocchio". When the puppet becomes sentient, he calls it his son. A Talking Cricket tries to help Pinocchio by giving him advice, but Pinocchio disregards it and burns his feet off by accident when resting near the fireplace. Geppetto promises him new feet on the condition that Pinocchio goes to school.

Pinocchio sets off to school, but is distracted by the puppet theatre. He joins the other living puppets and ruins the show. Furious, Mangiafuoco locks Pinocchio in his caravan and leaves town. Pinocchio begs to return to his father and Mangiafuoco lets him go, choosing to burn another puppet for firewood in his place. Pinocchio is upset by this and chooses to take the puppet's place. Surprised by his sacrifice, Mangiafuoco releases Pinocchio and gives him five gold coins to give to Geppetto.

On his way home, Pinocchio meets a fox and a cat pretending to be disabled (the Fox being lame and the Cat going blind). Attracted by the coins, they suggest that Pinocchio should sow them so they will sprout into a tree of money in the Field of Miracles, located in the Land of the Barn Owl. The Cat and the Fox trick him and disguise themselves as hooded assassins. Pinocchio hides the coins and attempts to flee but is caught and hung from a tree. He is rescued by a little girl, The Fairy with Turquoise Hair, who asks him why he was not at home or in school. Embarrassed, Pinocchio lies and his nose becomes bigger with each lie until the Fairy is forced to shorten his nose.

Having learned his lesson, Pinocchio returns home only to meet the Fox and the Cat a second time. Seeing that their plan failed, they convince him to go to the Field of Miracles again. Upon arriving, he plants the coins which the Fox and the Cat steal. Discovering the theft, Pinocchio reports it to the gorilla judge. Since justice does not favor the innocent in Barn Owl, he is sentenced to life. Pinocchio manages to get exonerated by telling the judge that he committed a crime before, making him guilty, and thus he is released.

Pinocchio returns home, but learns from one of the neighbors that Geppetto has left to look for him overseas in North America. Pinocchio attempts to find him, but gets shipwrecked on the Island of the Busy Bees. He is saved by the Blue Fairy (now a grown adult), who promises to turn him into a real boy if he studies and behaves.

Pinocchio goes to school and becomes the most studious boy in his class. He befriends Lucignolo, a disobedient boy who invites him to the Land of Toys where children can have fun all day long without schools, rules or adults after being taken there by The Coachman. After a long day in the Land of Toys, Pinocchio wakes up and finds that he and Lucignolo are turning into donkeys.

The Coachman sells Pinocchio to a circus. One day, Pinocchio notices the Fairy in the audience, trips, and cripples himself. The ringmaster decides to drown him and use his skin for a drum. In the sea, the Fairy summons fishes that nibble away Pinocchio's donkey skin, bringing him back to normal.

Pinocchio once again swims in search for his father and is swallowed by a gigantic ravenous whale-like sea monster. He finds Geppetto alive inside the monster. Taking advantage of the sea monster's asthma which forces him to sleep with his mouth open, the two flee from his mouth and reach the shore with the help of a big friendly tuna.

They find an abandoned house to rest in. To heal his father, who has gotten sick from the trip, Pinocchio works for a farmer to earn milk. Pinocchio continues to work and study and help Geppetto while he recovers. Pinocchio encounters the Fox and the Cat who try to cheat him out of his milk, but Pinocchio has learned from his past mistakes. The Fairy then grants Pinocchio his wish. He returns home and shows Geppetto that he has become a real boy.

== Cast ==
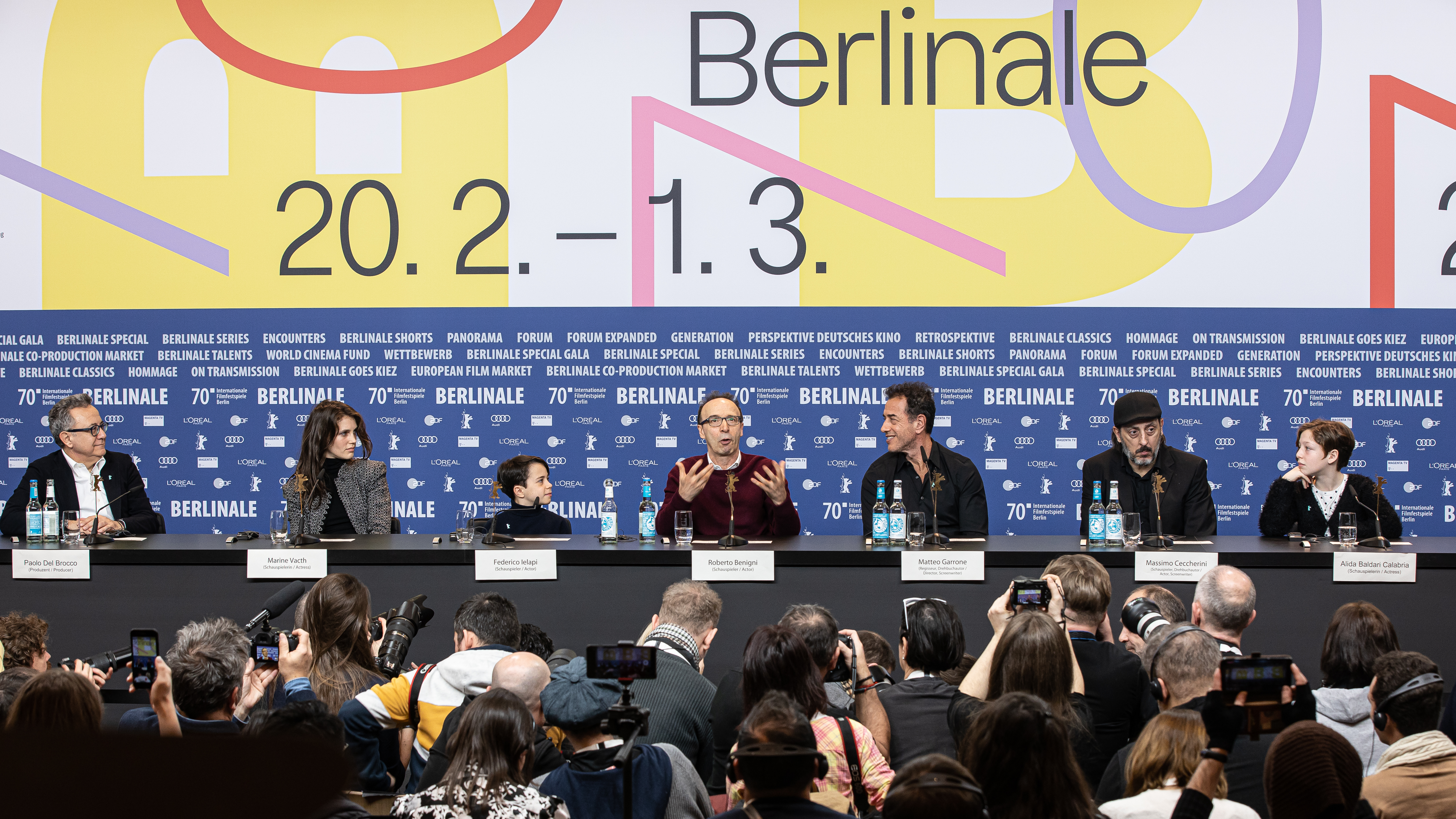
The film's cast and crew at the 2020 Berlin Film Festival. (L–R): producer Paolo Del Brocco, Marine Vacth, Federico Ielapi, Roberto Benigni, director Matteo Garrone, Massimo Ceccherini, and Alida Baldari Calabria.

- Federico Ielapi as Pinocchio
  - Ielapi dubbed himself in the English version
- Roberto Benigni as Geppetto
  - English dub voice: Antonio Palumbo
- Gigi Proietti as Mangiafuoco
  - English dub voice: Paolo Marchese
- Rocco Papaleo as the Cat
  - English dub voice: Vladimiro Conti
- Massimo Ceccherini as the Fox
  - English dub voice: Luigi Scribani
- Marine Vacth (dubbed by Domitilla D'Amico in both the Italian (Note: Vacth's voice can be heard in the teaser trailer, while D'Amico's voice was first heard in the final trailer) and English versions) as the Fairy with Turquoise Hair (adult)
- Alida Baldari Calabria as the Fairy with Turquoise Hair (child)
  - Baldari Calabria dubbed herself in the English version
- Alessio Di Domenicantonio as Lucignolo
  - English dub voice: Vittorio Thermes
- Maria Pia Timo as the Snail
  - English dub voice: Cristina Noci
- Davide Marotta as the Talking Cricket, the Pantalone Marionette, and Rabbit #1
  - English dub voice: Luca Dal Fabbro (all three characters)
- Paolo Graziosi as Mastro Ciliegia
  - English dub voice: Gerolamo Alchieri
- Massimiliano Gallo as Doctor Crow, the Director of the Circus, and Mastiff #1
  - English dub voices: Maurizio Lombardi (Doctor Raven) and Francesco Sechi (Director of the Circus)
- Gianfranco Gallo as Doctor Owl, Mastiff #2, and Medoro
  - English dub voice: Luigi Ferraro (Doctor Owl)
- Teco Celio as the Judge Gorilla
  - English dub voice: Marco Mete
- Enzo Vetrano as the Teacher
  - English dub voice: Fabrizio Apolloni
- Nino Scardina as The Coachman
  - English dub voice: Giancarlo Magalli
- Maurizio Lombardi as the Tuna
  - Lombardi dubbed himself in the English version
- Guillaume Delaunay as a Circus Performer (the tallest man in the world)
- Giuliano Del Taglia as a Circus Performer (the shortest man in the world) and the Devil Marionette
  - English dub voice: Vladimiro Conti (Devil Marionette)
- Domenico Centamore as Giangio
  - English dub voice: Bruno Conti
- Gigio Morra as Moreno (the Innkeeper in the scene with Geppetto)
  - English dub voice: Francesco Vairano
- Mauro Bucci as Remigio (Geppetto's neighbor)
  - English dub voice: Oliviero Dinelli
- Sergio Forconi as Cecconi (the Seller)
  - English dub voice: Carlo Reali
- Luisa Ragusa as the Colombina Marionette and Rabbit #2
  - English dub voice: Roberta Gasparetti (Colombina Marionette)
- Massimo Viafora as the Gendarme Marionette #1
- Claudio Gaetani as the Arlecchino Marionette
  - English dub voice: Edoardo Stoppacciaro
- Giovanni Iovino as the Pulcinella Marionette and Rabbit #3
- Betty La Padula as the Gianduja Marionette and Rabbit #4
- Aldo Marinucci as the Gendarme Marionette #2
- Ciro Petrone as Mangiafuoco's crier
  - English dub voice: Fabrizio De Flaviis

== Production ==
On 24 October 2016, it was announced that Toni Servillo was cast as Pinocchio's father Geppetto. Two years later, in October 2018, it was announced that Geppetto would be played by Roberto Benigni (who had played Pinocchio in a previous adaptation directed by himself), who said, "A great character, a great story, a great director: playing Geppetto directed by Matteo Garrone is one of the forms of happiness."

Nick Dudman was initially announced as working on the film, but later dropped out. Mark Coulier created the character design, prosthetics, and special make-up for the film.

Filming began on 18 March 2019 for 11 weeks in Tuscany, at Tenuta La Fratta, Lazio, and Apulia.

== Release ==
The film was theatrically released in Italy on 19 December 2019.

=== English dub ===
Garrone paid €150,000 out of his own pocket to dub the movie in English before even finding a distributor. He chose to use Italian voices to preserve the Italianness of the film, and to take advantage of the fact that Italians are master dubbers. Three actors dubbed themselves: Federico Ielapi as Pinocchio, Alida Baldari Calabria as the child Fairy, and Maurizio Lombardi as the Tuna; Lombardi also dubbed another character, Doctor Raven (played by Massimiliano Gallo). The adult fairy, played by Marine Vacth, is dubbed again by Domitilla D'Amico, who had already dubbed her in the Italian version. The dub was directed by Francesco Vairano, who also wrote the English dialogue.

In May 2020, Paolo Del Brocco, one of the movie's producers, said they were very close to selling Pinocchio to the US, but the coronavirus outbreak put the selling on hiatus. On July 27, that same year, it was announced that Vertigo Films had bought the UK and Ireland rights to the film, with plans to theatrically release it in late August. On July 28, the British Board of Film Classification gave the film a PG rating. On July 30, Vertigo published the English trailer, and revealed that the movie would be released in UK and Ireland on August 14, with previews from August 10.

On November 19, 2020, it was announced that Roadside Attractions had bought the US rights to the film. On November 30, it was revealed that the English version of the movie would be released in the United States and Canada on December 25.

== Marketing ==
On 29 March 2019, the first promotional image was released. The first trailer was published online on July 3, 2019.

== Reception ==
=== Box office ===
Pinocchio grossed $30.4 million, including $17.8 million in Italy, against a production budget of €11 million.

In Italy, the film made US$2.9 million in its opening weekend, finishing second behind Star Wars: The Rise of Skywalker. It made $1.9 million in its second weekend and $530,806 in its third, finishing third and sixth, respectively. The film grossed €15 million ($17.1 million) domestically, making it director Garrone's highest-grossing film domestically (beating 2008's Gomorrah, which made €10.2 million). It was also the sixth highest-grossing film in Italy in the 2019–2020 season (behind Tolo Tolo, The Lion King, Joker, Frozen II, and Once Upon a Time... in Bethlehem).

In the film's United Kingdom debut it grossed $140,810 (£107,260) from 271 theaters, becoming the third highest-grossing film since the British cinemas' re-opening from the COVID-19 pandemic. It went on to gross $1.1 million in the UK. In the United States, the film debuted to $274,600 from 736 theaters.

=== Critical response ===
On the review aggregator website Rotten Tomatoes, the film holds an approval rating of 83% based on 59 reviews, with an average rating of 6.9/10. The site's critics consensus reads: "Sticking closely to Carlo Collodi's original story, Matteo Garrone's Pinocchio pulls every string to create a visually stunning film that proves that some tales really are timeless." Metacritic reports a weighted average score of 65 out of 100 based on 11 critics, indicating "generally favorable reviews".

Deborah Young of The Hollywood Reporter wrote: 'Matteo Garrone's new Pinocchio brings genuine emotion to one of the most ambitious film adaptations to date of Carlo Collodi's 1883 kid classic.' Eric Kohn of IndieWire gave it a B rating and wrote: "Pinocchio imbues its circumstances with a surprising degree of naturalism, thanks to the filmmaker's careful handling of practical effects that suit the unusual tone." Peter Bradshaw of The Guardian gave it 4/5 stars, saying, "Pinocchio is a thoroughly bizarre story; Garrone makes of it a weirdly satisfying spectacle." Simran Hans of The Observer also gave the movie 4/5 stars, stating that, "The source material is a neat fit for the Italian film-maker, who traversed similarly episodic fairytale terrain with 2015's Tale of Tales. It's also a critique of society that feels timeless or, rather, timely – and not just for Garrone." Josefine Algieri of OneRoomwithaView.com wrote: "Pinocchio is still an enjoyable film, boasting an appropriately whimsical score and beautiful production design, and succeeds in creating a fairy tale even among the realism of poverty-stricken rural Italy."

At the Berlinale film festival 2020, the critics' consensus was that the film suffered from its realism, wearying viewers for lack of fairy tale flair, but that Benigni's scurrilous performance might provoke a few laughs.

=== Accolades ===
Award	Date of ceremony	Category	Recipient(s)	Result	Ref.
Academy Awards	April 25, 2021	Best Costume Design	Massimo Cantini Parrini	Nominated	
Academy Awards	April 25, 2021	Best Makeup and Hairstyling	Dalia Colli, Mark Coulier and Francesco Pegoretti	Nominated	
Art Directors Guild Awards	April 10, 2021	Excellence in Production Design for a Fantasy Film	Dimitri Capuani	Nominated	
British Academy Film Awards	April 11, 2021	Best Makeup and Hair	Mark Coulier	Nominated	
Capri Hollywood International Film Festival	December 28, 2019	Capri Best Costume Designer of the Year 2019	Massimo Cantini Parrini	Won	
Capri Hollywood International Film Festival	December 30, 2019	Capri Future Award 2019	Federico Ielapi	Won	
Costume Designers Guild Awards	April 13, 2021	Excellence in Sci-Fi/Fantasy Film	Massimo Cantini Parrini	Nominated	
David di Donatello Awards	May 8, 2020	Best Film	Pinocchio	Nominated	
David di Donatello Awards	May 8, 2020	Best Director	Matteo Garrone	Nominated	
David di Donatello Awards	May 8, 2020	Best Adapted Screenplay	Matteo Garrone and Massimo Ceccherini	Nominated	
David di Donatello Awards	May 8, 2020	Best Producer	Archimede, Le Pacte and Rai Cinema	Nominated	
David di Donatello Awards	May 8, 2020	Best Supporting Actress	Alida Baldari Calabria	Nominated	
David di Donatello Awards	May 8, 2020	Best Supporting Actor	Roberto Benigni	Nominated	
David di Donatello Awards	May 8, 2020	Best Cinematography	Nicolaj Brüel	Nominated	
David di Donatello Awards	May 8, 2020	Best Score	Dario Marianelli	Nominated	
David di Donatello Awards	May 8, 2020	Best Production Design	Dimitri Capuani	Won	
David di Donatello Awards	May 8, 2020	Best Costumes	Massimo Cantini Parrini	Won	
David di Donatello Awards	May 8, 2020	Best Make-up	Dalia Colli and Mark Coulier	Won	
David di Donatello Awards	May 8, 2020	Best Hairstyling	Francesco Pegoretti	Won	
David di Donatello Awards	May 8, 2020	Best Editing	Marco Spoletini	Nominated	
David di Donatello Awards	May 8, 2020	Best Sound	Mariacetta Lombardo, Luca Novelli, Daniela Bassani, Stefano Grosso and Gianni Pallotto	Nominated	
David di Donatello Awards	May 8, 2020	Best Visual Effects	Theo Demeris and Rodolfo Migliari	Won	
Nastro d'Argento	July 6, 2020	Best Film	Pinocchio	Nominated	
Nastro d'Argento	July 6, 2020	Best Director	Matteo Garrone	Won	
Nastro d'Argento	July 6, 2020	Best Producer	Matteo Garrone and Paolo Del Brocco	Nominated	
Nastro d'Argento	July 6, 2020	Best Supporting Actor	Roberto Benigni	Won	
Nastro d'Argento	July 6, 2020	Best Sets and Decorations	Dimitri Capuani	Won	
Nastro d'Argento	July 6, 2020	Best Costumes	Massimo Cantini Parrini	Won (Note: Tied with himself for his work on Bad Tales)	
Nastro d'Argento	July 6, 2020	Best Editing	Marco Spoletini	Won (Note: Tied with himself for his work on Villetta con ospiti)	
Nastro d'Argento	July 6, 2020	Best Sound	Maricetta Lombardo	Won	
Nastro d'Argento	July 6, 2020	Best Score	Dario Marianelli	Nominated	
Nastro d'Argento	July 6, 2020	Guglielmo Biraghi Prize	Federico Ielapi	Special Mention	
Globo d'oro	July 15, 2020	Best Film	Pinocchio	Nominated	
Globo d'oro	July 15, 2020	Best Director	Matteo Garrone	Nominated	
Globo d'oro	July 15, 2020	Best Best Cinematography	Nicolaj Brüel	Nominated	
Ischia Global Film & Music Fest	July 16, 2020	Ischia Art Award	Federico Ielapi	Won	
Bari International Film Festival	August 29, 2020	Franco Cristaldi Prize for Best Film Producer	Matteo Garrone and Paolo Del Brocco	Won	
Bari International Film Festival	August 29, 2020	Alberto Sordi Prize for Best Supporting Actor	Roberto Benigni	Won	
Bari International Film Festival	August 29, 2020	Piero Tosi for Best Costume Designer	Massimo Cantini Parrini	Won	
Golden Eagle Awards	January 22, 2021	Best Foreign Language Film	Pinocchio	Nominated	
34th Golden Rooster Awards (China)	December 30, 2021	Best Foreign Language Film	Pinocchio	Nominated	
