= Fabrizio Mazzotta =

Italian voice actor and comic book writer

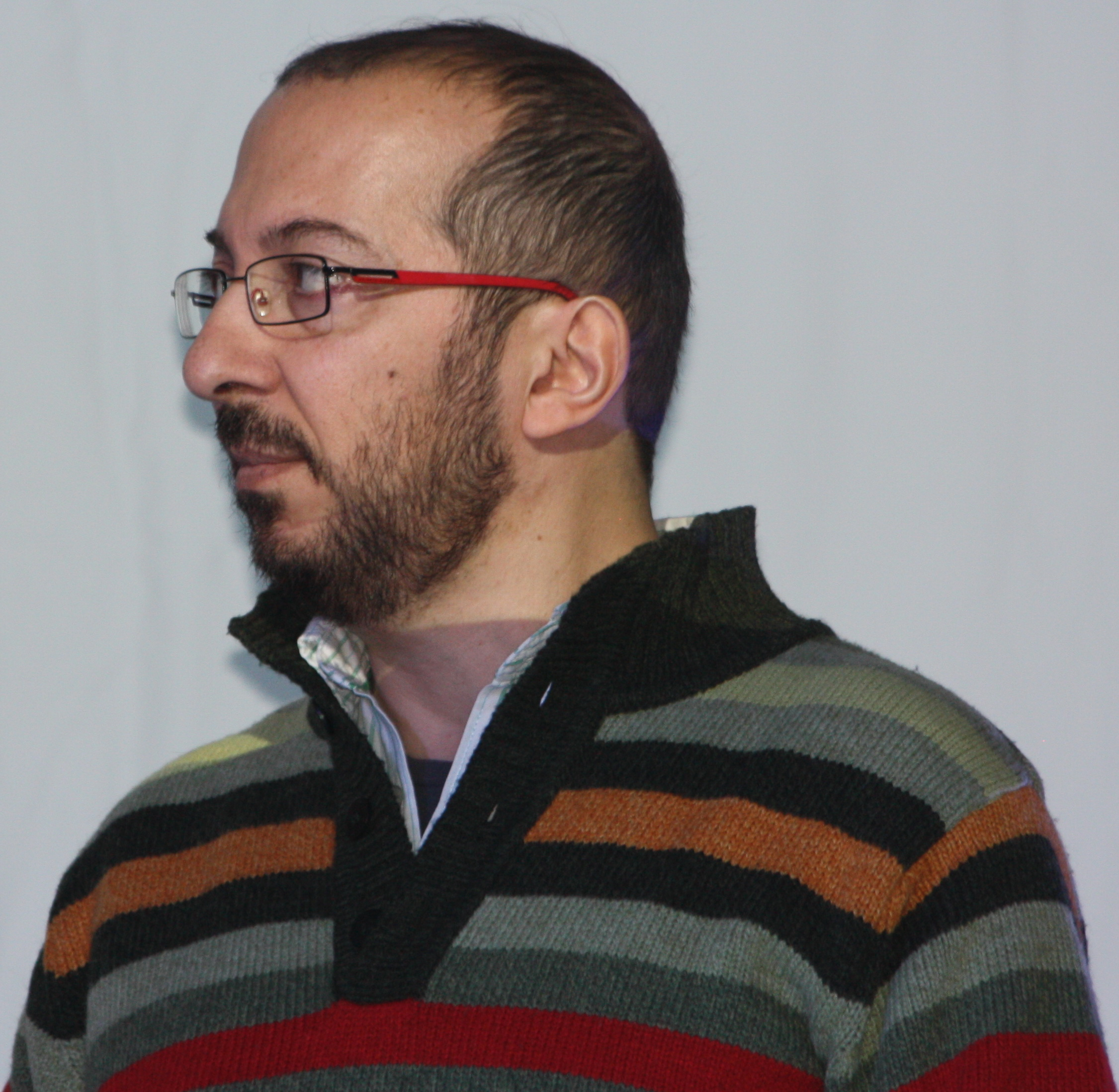
- Mazzotta in 2013
- Born: 1 December 1963 (age 62); Monza, Italy
- Occupations: Voice actor; dialogue writer; dubbing director; comic book writer
- Years active: 1970–present

Fabrizio Mazzotta (born 1 December 1963) is an Italian voice actor and comic book writer.

== Biography ==
Born in Monza, Italy, Mazzotta began his career as a screen actor at an early age. For technical reasons, sometimes he had to redub his own performances in post-syncronization; gaining experience in the studio, he became mainly active as a voice actor, dubbing cartoons and movies and voicing Italian animated characters. Mazzotta is well known for providing the Italian-dubbed voice of Krusty the Clown in the animated sitcom The Simpsons, Pinky in Pinky and the Brain, the Clumsy Smurf in The Smurfs, and Eros in Little Pollon. He has served as a dialogue writer for the Italian dubbed versions of shows such as Saved by the Bell, Beverly Hills, 90210 and Party of Five.

As a comic book writer, Mazzotta has assisted with the publications of comic strips featuring characters such as Lupo Alberto and Cattivik. He has even provided Italian dialogue for Mickey Mouse comic book stories.

== Voice work ==
=== Animation ===
- Barozzo in Il giornalino di Gian Burrasca
- Rospo saggio (The wise toad) in Cacasenno piccolo grande eroe
- Coccante in I Magotti e la pentola magica
- Portabò in I Roteò e la magia dello specchio
- Lepo in I Magicanti e i tre elementi
- Gras in Gli Animotosi nella terra di Nondove
- Ezio Maria in Il mondo di Stefi
- Mauritius in Gladiators of Rome
- Doremi in Acid Space
- Indian blackbird (episode 110) in Leo da Vinci

=== Dubbing roles ===
==== Animation ====
- Swee'Pea and Alice the Goon in Popeye the Sailor (film series, first Italian dub), The All New Popeye Hour
- Clumsy Smurf and Painter Smurf in The Smurfs (1981 TV series); Clumsy Smurf in The Smurfs, The Smurfs 2, The Smurfs (2021 TV series)
- Various characters in Loopy de Loop (3rd Italian dub), Urusei Yatsura
- Eros in Little Pollon
- Krusty the Clown in The Simpsons, The Simpsons Movie, Family Guy
- Pinky in Animaniacs, Pinky and the Brain, Pinky, Elmyra & the Brain
- P-Chan and Mou Mou in Ranma ½
- Jingoro and Kazuya Hatta in Kimagure Orange Road (1996 Italian redub), Kazuya Hatta in New Kimagure Orange Road Movie ~ And, The Beginning of that Summer (1999 Italian dub)
- Three Blind Mice in Shrek
- Moon Farmer (episode 6.14) and David Farnsworth in Futurama
- The Crow in Brave
- Frankie Da Flea in Tom and Jerry: The Movie
- Mac in Jetsons: The Movie
- Orko in Masters of the Universe: Revelation, Ork-0 in He-Man and the Masters of the Universe (2021 TV series)

==== Live action ====
- Giovannone in While There's War There's Hope
- Mariangela Fantozzi in Fantozzi contro tutti
- Parrot in Treasure Island (2012 TV series)

=== Video games ===
- Krusty the Clown in The Simpsons Game
