= Francesco Vairano =

Italian voice actor

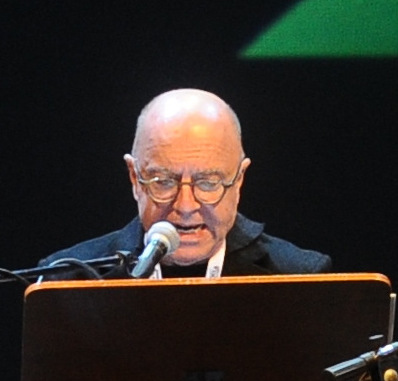
- Vairano attending the Lucca Comics & Games convention in 2015
- Born: 11 January 1944 (age 82); Naples, Italy
- Occupations: Actor; voice actor; dialogue adapter; dubbing director
- Years active: 1969–present

Francesco Vairano (born 11 January 1944) is an Italian actor and voice actor.

== Biography ==
Born in Naples, Vairano began his career in the late 1960s working as a theatre actor. He also made appearances on television and worked for the radio industry. However, he is generally well known to the Italian public as a voice dubber. He is best known for providing the Italian voices of Severus Snape (portrayed by Alan Rickman) from the Harry Potter film franchise and Gollum (portrayed by Andy Serkis) from both The Lord of the Rings and The Hobbit. He has also occasionally dubbed actors such as Robert Downey Jr., William Hurt, and Ian McDiarmid.

In Vairano's animated roles, he is known for dubbing Dr. Bunsen Honeydew and various characters in The Muppets. Additionally, Vairano dubbed Moreno, the innkeeper (portrayed physically by Gigio Morra), in the English dub of Matteo Garrone's Pinocchio, as well as writing the English dialogue and supervising and directing the dubbing process.

In December 2016, Vairano announced that he would be semi-retiring from voice dubbing and would only make rare comebacks.

== Filmography ==
=== Cinema ===
- Prima che sia troppo presto (1981)
- Johan Padan a la descoverta de le Americhe (2001) - voice
- Chi ha paura?... (2003) - voice
- Gladiators of Rome (2012) - voice

=== Television ===
- Sherlock Holmes, part 1: The Valley of Fear - TV Miniseries (1968)
- Rebecca - TV play (1969)
- Le avventure di Ciuffettino - TV miniseries (1969)
- I ragazzi di padre Tobia - TV miniseries (1969–1970)
- Special-Sto - TV miniseries (1970)
- Le terre del sacramento - TV miniseries (1970)
- The Age of the Medici - TV miniseries (1972–73)
- All'ultimo minuto - TV series (1973)
- Processo per magia - TV play (1974)
- La scuola della maldicenza - TV play (1975)
- Non stop - TV show (1977)
- Ma che cos'è questo amore - TV miniseries (1979)
- L'eredità della priora - TV miniseries (1980)
- Quattro grandi giornalisti - TV miniseries, Mario Pannunzio episode (1980)
- Don Chisciotte - TV play (1983)
- La TV delle ragazze - variety show (1988)

== Dubbing roles ==
=== Animation ===
- Dr. Bunsen Honeydew in The Muppet Movie, The Great Muppet Caper, The Muppet Christmas Carol, Muppet Treasure Island, Muppets From Space, It's a Very Merry Muppet Christmas Movie, The Muppets' Wizard of Oz, The Muppets, Muppets Most Wanted (Italian version)
- Animal, Beaker, Betina Cratchit, Peter Cratchit and Bean Bunny in The Muppet Christmas Carol (Italian version)
- Beaker, Lew Zealand and Neville in The Great Muppet Caper (Italian version)
- Camilla the Chicken, Janice and Lew Zealand in The Muppet Movie (Italian 1994 version)
- Tom and Droopy in Tom and Jerry: The Movie (Italian version)
- Merlin in Shrek the Third; Rumpelstiltskin in Shrek Forever After, Donkey's Christmas Shrektacular, Shrek's Yule Log (Italian version)
- Mr. Ping in Kung Fu Panda, Kung Fu Panda 2, Kung Fu Panda 3 (Italian version)
- Second Ancestor in Mulan, Mulan II (Italian version)
- Dapper Duck in Donald's Double Trouble (Italian version)
- Dr. Finkelstein in The Nightmare Before Christmas (Italian version)
- Huy in The Prince of Egypt (Italian version)
- Oscar the Grouch in The Adventures of Elmo in Grouchland (Italian version)
- Berkeley Beetle in Thumbelina (Italian version)
- George Merry in The Pagemaster (Italian version)
- Madame Gasket in Robots (Italian version)
- Boingo in Hoodwinked! (Italian version)
- Rat in Sinbad: Legend of the Seven Seas (Italian version)
- Tiger in Over the Hedge (Italian version)
- Morty in ChalkZone (Italian version)
- The Priest in Hellsing (Italian version)

=== Live action ===
- Moreno the innkeeper in Pinocchio (2019 film)
- Severus Snape in Harry Potter and the Philosopher's Stone, Harry Potter and the Chamber of Secrets, Harry Potter and the Prisoner of Azkaban, Harry Potter and the Goblet of Fire, Harry Potter and the Order of the Phoenix, Harry Potter and the Half-Blood Prince, Harry Potter and the Deathly Hallows – Part 1, Harry Potter and the Deathly Hallows – Part 2 (Italian version)
- Gollum in The Lord of the Rings: The Fellowship of the Ring, The Lord of the Rings: The Two Towers, The Lord of the Rings: The Return of the King, The Hobbit: An Unexpected Journey (Italian version)
- Palpatine / Darth Sidious in Star Wars: Episode III – Revenge of the Sith, Star Wars: Episode IX – The Rise of Skywalker (Italian version)
- Grandpa in The Munsters (season 2), The Munsters Today (Italian version)
- Parody Commendatore and Wig Salesman in Amadeus (Italian version)
- Commissioner Bales and Showgirls Stage Manager in Casino (1995 film) (Italian version)
- Spiders in The Hobbit: The Desolation of Smaug (Italian version)
- Charlie Chaplin in Chaplin (Italian version)
- Luis Molina in Kiss of the Spider Woman (Italian version)
- Hans in My Own Private Idaho (Italian version)
- The Witch of 71 in El Chavo del Ocho (Italian Version)
