= Venerdì 12 =

Comic strip series

Venerdì 12 ("Friday the 12th," a spoof of Friday the 13th) is a comic strip series created by Italian author Leo Ortolani first published in 1996 as a series in the comic magazine L'isola che non c'è and continued on the Rat-Man Collection, where it was also completed.

It tells the story of Aldo, a man who becomes a hideous monster after being dumped by his girlfriend Bedelia and his evil servant Giuda.

== Plot ==
Everything starts at school, where Aldo meets and falls in love with Bedelia, a schoolmate of his who has had an affair with almost every boy at school but him. He tries many approaches, failing miserably, until Bedelia accepts his court in order to win a bet. So Aldo, full of joy, decides to buy her, as a birthday gift, a music box. The salesman offers him, for free, a cursed music box with a dancing puppet warning him: if he gives it to a woman who does not love him, he will turn into a monster; the curse will be broken only if he finds a woman who really loves him or if he sacrifices a virgin. Aldo ignores the curse and, on the titular Friday, October 12, gives the music box to Bedelia, who, shortly after, breaks up with him and throws the music box out of the window of her car, breaking the statuette on it. Aldo, left alone in the middle of the street, painfully turns into a monster. It's here that he meets Giuda, an extravagant runt who is searching for a master and accepts to become Aldo's evil servant.

From that moment, Aldo first tries to take back Bedelia; then, helped but more often hindered by Giuda, tries to find, despite his appearance only partially hidden by a mask, someone who really loves him to break the curse, as it is easier than finding a virgin. In his misadventures he will meet various strange women like Ciurga and Isolda and finally meets Dlcistella, his neighbour, who finally breaks the curse, on Saturday the 13th, making Aldo to l in love with her. Moreover, in that moment it's also revealed that Giuda is in reality the music box's statuette, so he turns back into the music box, ready to serve the next unrequited lover who will be cursed.
