= Leonardo Ortolani =

Italian comics author (born 1967)

Leo Ortolani
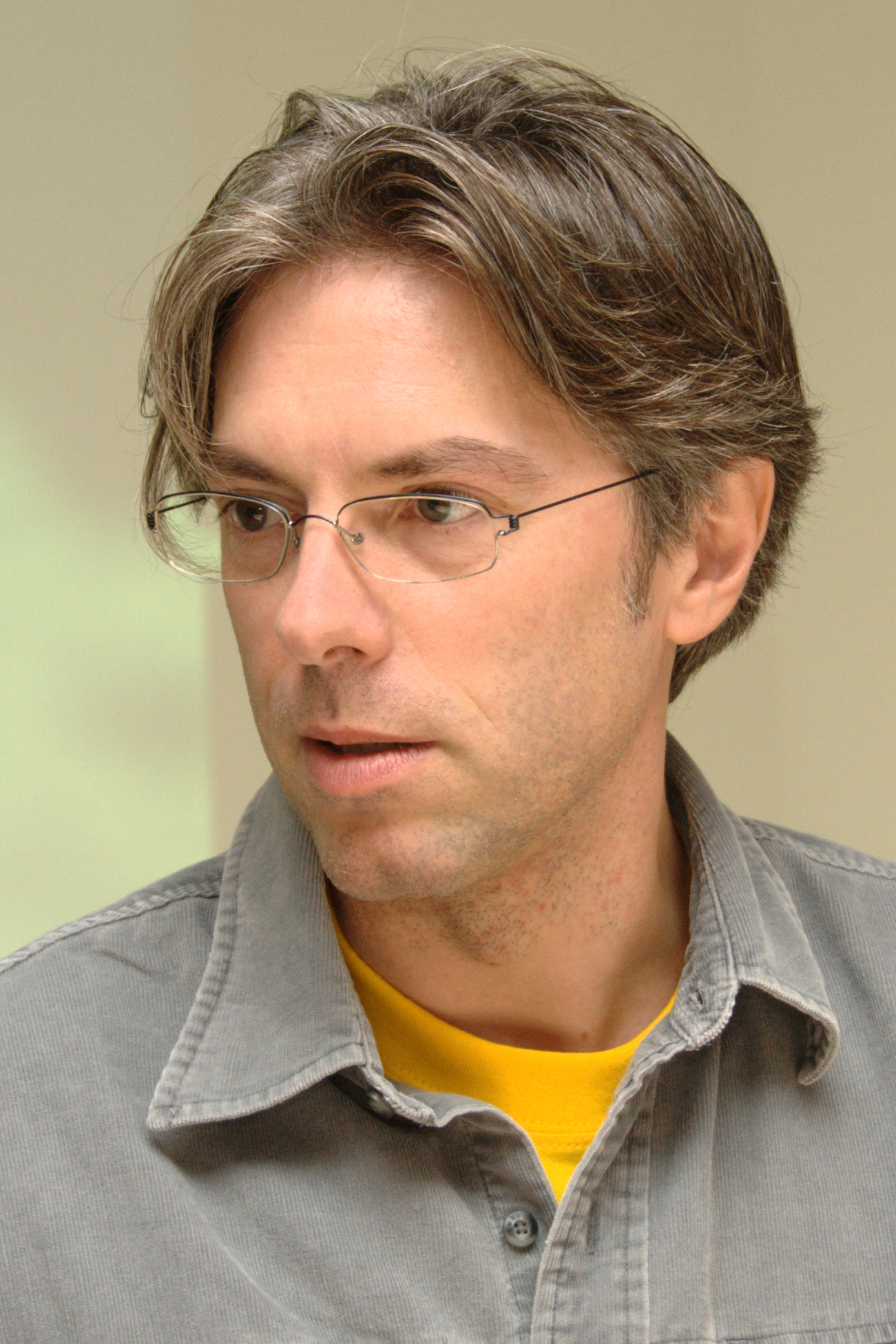
- Ortolani in 2009
- Born: Leonardo Ortolani; 14 January 1967 (age 59) Pisa, Italy
- Areas: Writer, Artist
- Notable works: Rat-Man
- Awards: Best Newcomer (Lucca Comics & Games), 1990; U Giancu's Prize, 2001
- Spouse: Caterina Ortolani

Leonardo Ortolani (born 14 January 1967), better known as Leo, is an Italian comics author, creator of the comic book series Rat-Man.

== Early life ==
He was born in Pisa. In 1968 Ortolani moved to Parma, where he still lives with his wife Caterina and his adoptive daughters Johanna and Lucy Maria.

From an early age, Ortolani showed a great passion for the world of comic books, and in particular The Fantastic Four by Jack Kirby and Stan Lee, which will affect its style of narrative.

After finishing high school, he enrolled at the University of Parma to study Geology. While at university, Ortolani draws his characters first, and the theme of geology became a catchphrase of the first issues of his major work, Rat-Man.

== Career ==
=== First works and the creation of Rat-Man ===
In 1989 joined publishing house Comic Art to work on two stories: the tragic and the other comic. Publisher Rinaldo Traini published the comic story on the second Spot (supplement of Eternauta dedicated to beginners), marking the Birth of Rat-Man.

The shocking origins of Rat-Man earned Ortolani an award for best newcomer by Lucca Comics of 1990. With this visibility, Leo began to collaborate with magazines and independent fanzines.

For the fanzineMade in USA he created two more stories starring Rat-Man ( Topin! The Wonder Mouse! And From the Future) and several parodies of superheroes (including X-Men, Fantastic Four and Superman).

The most important works of this cycle are his four parodies of the Fantastic Four. Kirby stopped drawing Fantastic Four at issue #102. For the Italian fanzine Made in USA, Ortolani produced a four-part Fantastic Four story conceived as an imagined conclusion to Stan Lee and Jack Kirby's run on the series..

Called to military service in the Air Force, Ortolani drew inspiration from life in the barracks, gathering his experiences in a detailed diary that became the starting point for The last rookie, a strip on military life (the same as the protagonist Ortolani) which were published as an appendix to Storm Trooper.

During this period, Ortolani also collaborated on the Starcomìx humor magazine directed by Luca Boschi and published by Star Comics in Totem Comic and Totem Extra, where he made The impervious, Clan, The wonder of nature and The wonders of technology. In this period he also stripped the series Those of Parma, published in the Gazzetta di Parma, speaking of the city of Parma and its inhabitants, a selection of which was collected in the volume Editions Bands Dessinée. The short stories of the series of Wonderland were taken years later, collected in three volumes by Panini Comics.

=== Popularity and the contract with Marvel Italia ===
In 1995 Leo Ortolani published Venerdì 12 as a series of the comic magazine L'isola che non c'è. That same year, Ortolani chose to self-publish the comic book series Rat-Man alongside his primary job as a geologist; however, in 1997 Leo signed a contract with Marvel Italia, today a brand owned by Panini Comics (and, at the time, a branch of Marvel Comics itself), to publish the comic under the Marvel brand, which allowed Leonardo to become a full-time comics author. The contract also allowed him to use popular Marvel characters like Spider-Man, Captain America, Wolverine, Doctor Doom and Elektra in Rat-Man stories; however, copyright problems have since prohibited such use of characters in the Rat-Man world.

=== Successful parodies ===
Ortolani created several popular parodies of famous works of fiction and blockbusters in his Rat-Man stories. In 1999 Leo Ortolani created Star Rats, a parody of Star Wars. In 2004 he created Il Signore dei Ratti, a parody of The Lord of the Rings trilogy. In 2005 Ortolani published Star Rats - Episodio I, a parody of Star Wars: Episode I – The Phantom Menace, which was the best selling Panini Comics book in the release month. In 2007 Ortolani created 299+1, a parody of 300 and one of his best works. In 2009 he created Ratto, a parody of Rambo films. In 2010 he published Avarat, a parody of Avatar. In 2011 Leo Ortolani created La Quadrilogia dei Sacrificabili, a parody of The Expendables series, that won the award "Fede a strisce 2011" at RiminiComix. In 2012 he created Il Grande Magazzi, a parody of Harry Potter and Twilight series. That same year he published also Allen, a parody of Alien. In 2014 Leo Ortolani published Star Rats - Episodio II, a parody of Star Wars: Episode II – Attack of the Clones, and then soon after in 2015 he published also Star Rats - Episodio III, a parody of Star Wars: Episode III – Revenge of the Sith.

=== The end of the series Rat-Man ===
In 2016 Ortolani stated his intention to close the series Rat-Man with issue #122, which was published around September 2017.

== Main works ==
- Le meraviglie (1994-1996)
- Rat-Man (1995-2017)
- Gli intaccabili (1995)
- Venerdì 12 (1996-2004)
- La lunga notte dell'investigatore Merlo (1997)
- Star Rats (1999)
- Il Signore dei Ratti (2004)
- Star Rats - Episodio I (2005)
- Avarat (2010)
- Allen (2012)
- Ratolik (2013)
- Star Rats - Episodio II (2014)
- Star Rats - Episodio III (2015)
- C'è spazio per tutti (2017)
- Ratboy (2018)
- Cinzia (2018)
- Blu tramonto (2021)
- Tapum (2025)

== Other minor creations ==
- L'ultima burba
- Morgan
- Elf Me (2023; story and screenplay)
