= Federico Ielapi =

Italian actor (born 2010)

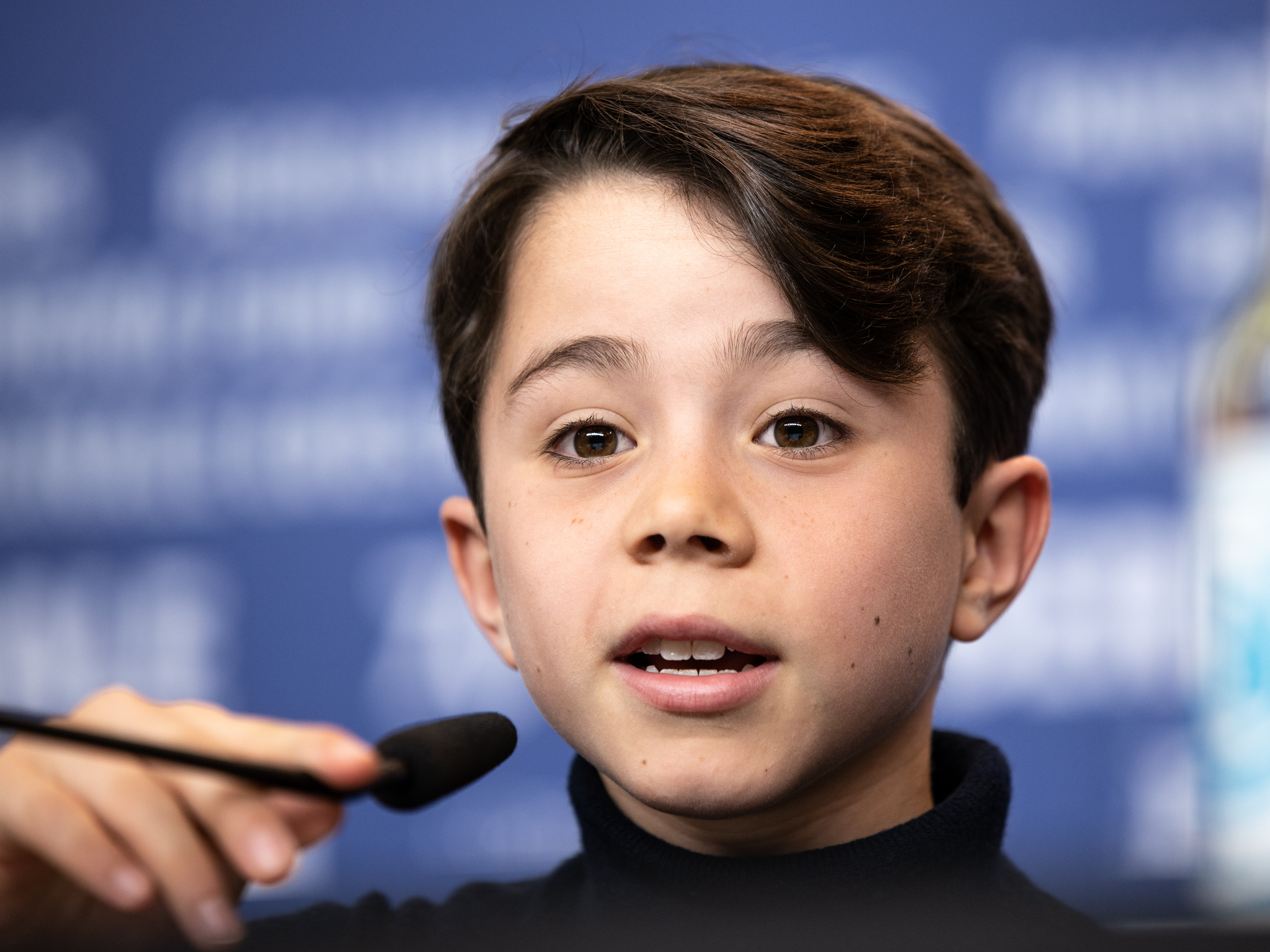
- Ielapi in a press conference for the film Pinocchio during the 2020 Berlin Film Festival
- Born: 12 July 2010 (age 16); Rome, Italy
- Occupation: Actor
- Years active: 2016–present
- Notable work: Pinocchio (2019); Elf Me (2023)

Federico Ielapi (born 12 July 2010) is an Italian actor. He received a special mention to the Guglielmo Biraghi Prize as part of the 2020 edition of the Nastro d'Argento Awards for the film Pinocchio, in which he played the title character.

== Biography ==
He made his debut in 2016, at the age of six, in the film Quo Vado? by Gennaro Nunziante, playing Checco Zalone as a child.

He then took part in the 2018 film The King's Musketeers, directed by Giovanni Veronesi, and in some television spots for Italo Treno, together with actor Francesco Pannofino. In 2018 he was also part of the main cast of season 11 of the TV series Don Matteo, playing Cosimo Farina.

In 2019 he played Pinocchio in the film of the same name directed by Matteo Garrone, receiving a special mention to the Guglielmo Biraghi Prize as part of the 2020 edition of the Nastro d'Argento Awards; Ielapi also dubbed himself in the English version of the film. In the same year he also took part to the film Brave ragazze, directed by Michela Andreozzi, playing the role of Francesco.

== Filmography ==
=== Films ===
2016	Quo Vado?	Checco as a child	Feature film debut
2018	The King's Musketeers	Antonio	
2019	Brave ragazze	Francesco Morelli	
2019	Pinocchio	Pinocchio	Lead role
2020	Maledetta primavera	Lorenzo	
2021	Tutti per 1 - 1 per tutti	Uno	
2021	Don't Kill Me		
2023	Elf Me	Elia	Lead role
2024	Cabrini	Paolo	

=== Television ===
Year	Title	Role	Notes
2017	Squadra Mobile	Doctor's nephew	Episode: "Quinto episodio"
2018	Don Matteo	Cosimo Farina	Main role (season 11); 25 episodes
2021	Chiamami ancora amore	Pietro	Miniseries
2024	Brigands: The Quest for Gold	Jurillo	Miniseries; 6 episodes
