= Gladiators of Rome (film) =

- Italian theatrical release poster
- Italian: Gladiatori di Roma
- Directed by: Iginio Straffi
- Screenplay by: Iginio Straffi; Michael J. Wilson
- Story by: Iginio Straffi
- Produced by: Mario Anniballi; Iginio Straffi
- Starring: Luca Argentero; Laura Chiatti; Belén Rodríguez; Massimo Corvo; Enzo Avolio; Fabrizio Mazzotta; Gianluca Machelli; Daniela Abbruzzese; Fabrizio De Flaviis; Michele Cucuzza; Francesco Vairano
- Cinematography: Gianmario Catania
- Edited by: Joanne Lee; Serena Dovì
- Music by: Bruno Zambrini; Tommy Caputo
- Production company: Rainbow S.p.A. (Viacom)
- Distributed by: Medusa Film
- Release date: October 18, 2012
- Running time: 95 minutes
- Country: Italy
- Language: Italian
- Budget: $45-55 million
- Box office: $10 million

Gladiators of Rome (Italian: Gladiatori di Roma) is a 2012 Italian computer-animated comedy film produced by Rainbow, a studio co-owned by Iginio Straffi and Viacom at the time. Viacom's Paramount Pictures released the film in North America while Medusa Film handled distribution in Italy. The film was directed by Straffi, who also co-wrote the screenplay with Michael J. Wilson. Gladiators of Rome had its world premiere in Italy on 18 October 2012.

While conceiving the idea for the film, Iginio Straffi chose to write about ancient Rome so that he could set the story in Italy while still appealing to an international audience. Gladiators of Rome is a spoof of serious films about gladiators, which Straffi said "easily lend themselves to parody." Paramount Pictures (the film unit of Viacom, which co-owns Rainbow) worked with the Italian team on both the casting and story for the film; Paramount asked for certain scenes to be changed for American audiences. The project was in development for over five years and became one of the most expensive Italian films ever made. Its production budget alone was estimated to be around $45–55 million in U.S. dollars, with promotion and advertising costs bringing its total to almost $80 million (70 million euros).

The film was a box-office bomb, grossing just 818,913 euros in its opening weekend. Triboo Media's Federico Boni wrote that "there could not have been a worse opening for the 'blockbuster.'" According to Box Office Mojo, the film ended its theatrical release with about $10 million worldwide. In 2016, Straffi presumed that the poor performance of the film was a result of the Rainbow studio's lack of experience with cinema.

== Plot ==
During the reign of Emperor Domitian in Imperial Rome, young Timo is an orphan of Pompeii's terrible eruption. He is adopted by general Chirone, and raised in the most famous Gladiators' Academy in Rome. However, Timo is a gladiator. He wants to hang out with his friends, Ciccius and Mauritius, and avoid his stepfather's training sessions at all costs. When Timo meets and falls in love with the beautiful Lucilla, he decides to change his life and bring out the valor inside himself. Through spells, crazy raids in the woods and the terrible trainings of a very personal lady trainer, Timo has to transform himself into the greatest gladiator of all time.

== Voice cast ==
| Character | Italian | English |
|---|---|---|
| Timo | Luca Argentero | John Schwab |
| Lucilla | Laura Chiatti | Jo Wyatt |
| Diana | Belén Rodríguez | Flaminia Fegarotti |
| Cassio | Fabrizio De Flaviis | Tim Beckmann |
| Circe | Daniela Abbruzzese | Emma Tate |
| Domitian | Enzo Avolio | Jonathan Keeble |
| Chirone | Massimo Corvo | Glenn Wrage |
| Mauritius | Fabrizio Mazzotta | Walter Lewis |
| Ciccius | Gianluca Machelli | Mikey O'Connor |
| Fabrickius | Francesco Vairano | William Hope |

== Production ==
In November 2007, Iginio Straffi first mentioned that he was working with Michael J. Wilson on a comedy film, but it was "still a top-secret topic." The film was officially announced in October 2008 under the working title Versus Roma. It was tentatively scheduled for a release date in 2010.

== Soundtrack ==
1. "You Spin Me Round (Like a Record)"
2. "The Final Countdown"
3. "The Best"
4. "Symphony No. 5"
5. "Everyday"
6. "Tears and Rain" - James Blunt
