= Massimo Corvo =

Italian actor and voice actor (born 1959)

- Born: 9 July 1959 (age 67); Rome, Italy
- Occupations: Actor; voice actor; dubbing director; theatre director
- Years active: 1963–present

Massimo Corvo (born 9 July 1959) is an Italian actor and voice actor.

== Biography ==
Born in Rome, Corvo started his career as a child actor, appearing in TV commercials, and films: in 1963 he took part in Federico Fellini's 8½ and Marco Ferreri's The Conjugal Bed, although the scene involving him in the latter did not make it to the final cut. Corvo has also acted in theatre, radio, and several television shows, most notably Il capitano, Butta la luna, and Squadra antimafia – Palermo oggi.

He has been most active in voice dubbing since the late 1980s and has dubbed a number of animated Disney roles, including the Beast in Beauty and the Beast, Shan-Yu in Mulan, Bloat in Finding Nemo, Pete in Mickey Mouse's cartoons, and Jafar in Aladdin. In addition, he dubs over Gendo Ikari in the anime series Neon Genesis Evangelion. Corvo also voiced the Crow in Enzo D'Alò's 2012 film Pinocchio; coincidentally, "Corvo" precisely means "Crow" in Italian.

Corvo has become the official Italian voice of Sylvester Stallone since the death of Ferruccio Amendola in 2001 as well as dubbing over the voices of Laurence Fishburne and Jean Reno in most of their roles. He is also a regular voice actor for Forest Whitaker, Sean Bean, Tom Sizemore, Vin Diesel, Samuel L. Jackson, Jeff Bridges, Patrick Bergin, Benicio del Toro, Andy Serkis, Bruce Willis, and has dubbed the title character (portrayed by Tony Todd) in the first two Candyman films, and others.

== Filmography ==
=== Cinema ===
Year	Title	Role	Notes
1964	8½		
1999	Deceit	Otello	Original title: Il gioco
1999	La vera madre		
2003	Do You Mind If I Kiss Mommy?	Rodolfo	Original title: Ti spiace se bacio mamma?
2003	Love, Lies, Kids... & Dogs	Giulio Sorbati	Original title: Uomini & donne, amori & bugie
2003	Chi ha paura?...	Judge (voice)	Animated film
2004	Lights Out		Original title: A luci spente
2012	Pinocchio	Crow (voice)	Animated film
2012	Gladiators of Rome	Chirone (voice)	Animated film
2019	A.N.I.M.A.		

=== Television ===
Year	Title	Role	Notes
2002–2003	Cuori rubati	Inspector Sepe	Soap opera (13 episodes)
2003	Distretto di Polizia	Enzo Scalone	TV series (episode 4x08)
2005	Il maresciallo Rocca	Antonio Cannata	TV series (episode 5x02)
2005	Il mondo è meraviglioso	Head Fireman	TV film
2005–2007	Il capitano	Thomas Simeoni	Main cast
2006	Carabinieri		TV series (episode 6x25)
2006–2009	Throw the Moon	Don Eugenio	Recurring role
2010	Il peccato e la vergogna	Il Bisonte	TV series (episode 1x01)
2011	Cugino & cugino	Quinto Vitella	Recurring role
2011	La ragazza americana	Marshall Monti	TV miniseries
2011–2014	Squadra antimafia – Palermo oggi	Goffredo Pulvirenti	Recurring role
2016	Super Italian Family		TV webseries
2017	Il bello delle donne... alcuni anni dopo	Emerenzio	TV series (episode 1x04)
2019	Adrian	Mayor of Milan (voice)	Animated series

=== Dubbing ===
==== Films (Animation, Italian dub) ====
Year	Title	Role(s)	Ref
1986	The Great Mouse Detective	Thug Guard #2	
1990	Plutopia	Milton (1990 dubbing)	
1991	Beauty and the Beast	Beast	
1992	Aladdin	Jafar	
1994	Asterix Conquers America	Obelix	
1994	The Return of Jafar	Jafar	
1995	A Goofy Movie	Pete	
1995	Balto	Steele	
1995	Runaway Brain	Doctor Frankenollie	
1997	The Many Adventures of Winnie the Pooh	Owl (1997 dubbing)	
1997	Neon Genesis Evangelion: Death & Rebirth	Gendo Ikari	
1997	The End of Evangelion	Gendo Ikari	
1997	Beauty and the Beast: The Enchanted Christmas	Beast	
1998	Mulan	Shan Yu	
1998	Pooh's Grand Adventure: The Search for Christopher Robin	Owl (1998 dubbing)	
1998	Belle's Magical World	Beast	
1998	Great Mazinger vs. Getter Robo	Kenzo Kabuto (1998 dubbing)	
1998	Quest for Camelot	Lord Ruber	
1999	Mickey's Once Upon a Christmas	Pete	
2000	The Tigger Movie	Owl	
2000	An Extremely Goofy Movie	Pete	
2000	The Little Mermaid II: Return to the Sea	Undertow	
2000	Dinosaur	Bruton	
2001	Mickey's Magical Christmas: Snowed in at the House of Mouse	Beast	
2001	Mickey's Magical Christmas: Snowed in at the House of Mouse	Jafar	
2001	Osmosis Jones	Thrax	
2002	Winnie the Pooh and a Day for Eeyore	Owl (2002 dubbing)	
2002	Mickey's House of Villains	Jafar	
2003	Piglet's Big Movie	Owl	
2003	Finding Nemo	Bloat	
2004	Mickey, Donald, Goofy: The Three Musketeers	Pete	
2004	Seasons of Giving	Owl (2004 dubbing)	
2004	The Incredibles	Lucius Best / Frozone	
2005	Tarzan II	Kago	
2005	Midsummer Dream	Oberon	
2005	Hoodwinked!	Wolf W. Wolf	
2006	The Ant Bully	Stan Beals	
2006	Barnyard	Ben	
2006	Happy Feet	Lovelace	
2007	Evangelion: 1.0 You Are (Not) Alone	Gendo Ikari	
2007	TMNT	Narrator	
2008	Ponyo	Fujimoto	
2008	Igor	King Malbert	
2009	Evangelion: 2.0 You Can (Not) Advance	Gendo Ikari	
2010	Porco Rosso	Porco Rosso / Marco Rossolini (2010 dubbing)	
2011	Winnie the Pooh	Owl	
2012	Evangelion: 3.0 You Can (Not) Redo	Gendo Ikari	
2012	Ernest & Celestine	Bear Judge	
2012	Frankenweenie	Mr. Burgermeister	
2013	Tom and Jerry: Robin Hood and His Merry Mouse	Little John (2013 dubbing)	
2014	How to Train Your Dragon 2	Drago Bludvist	
2014	The Book of Life	Xibalba	
2015	The Good Dinosaur	Butch	
2016	Ratchet & Clank	Lieutenant Victor Von Ion	
2016	Finding Dory	Bloat	
2018	Christopher Robin	Owl	
2018	Incredibles 2	Lucius Best / Frozone	
2019	Lady and the Tramp	Trusty	
2021	Evangelion: 3.0+1.0 Thrice Upon a Time	Gendo Ikari	
2021	Luca	Massimo Marcovaldo	
2021	Tom and Jerry	Cecil	
2024	Transformers One	Alpha Trion	

==== Films (Live action, Italian dub) ====
Year	Title	Role(s)	Original actor	Ref
1986	The Color of Money	Amos	Forest Whitaker	
1986	Henry: Portrait of a Serial Killer	Henry	Michael Rooker	
1987	Ernest Goes to Camp	Ernest P. Worrell	Jim Varney	
1987	Stakeout	Jack Pismo	Forest Whitaker	
1987	Planes, Trains and Automobiles	Del Griffith	John Candy	
1987	Light of Day	Oogie	Michael Rooker	
1988	The Big Blue	Enzo Molinari	Jean Reno	
1988	Tequila Sunrise	Hal Maguire	J. T. Walsh	
1988	Betrayed	Gary Simmons	Tom Berenger	
1988	Beetlejuice	Otho Fenlock	Glenn Shadix	
1988	Ernest Saves Christmas	Ernest P. Worrell	Jim Varney	
1989	Lethal Weapon 2	Jerry Collins	Grand L. Bush	
1989	In Country	Emmett Smith	Bruce Willis	
1989	The Wizard	Sam Woods (TV redub)	Beau Bridges	
1989	Hider in the House	Tom Sykes	Gary Busey	
1990	King of New York	James "Jimmy Jump" Colt	Laurence Fishburne	
1990	Cadence	Roosevelt Stokes	Laurence Fishburne	
1990	Predator 2	Peter Keyes	Gary Busey	
1990	Marked for Death	John Hatcher	Steven Seagal	
1990	Desperate Hours	Albert	David Morse	
1990	The Exorcist III	Mel Atkins	Grand L. Bush	
1990	Arachnophobia	Henry Beechwood	Peter Jason	
1991	Diary of a Hitman	Dekker	Forest Whitaker	
1991	Ernest Scared Stupid	Ernest P. Worrell	Jim Varney	
1991	Sleeping with the Enemy	Martin Burney	Patrick Bergin	
1991	The Addams Family	Tully Alford	Dan Hedaya	
1991	Teenage Mutant Ninja Turtles II: The Secret of the Ooze	Raphael	Laurie Faso	
1991	Showdown in Little Tokyo	Chris Kenner	Dolph Lundgren	
1991	Career Opportunities	C.D. Marsh	John Candy	
1991	Queens Logic	Al	Joe Mantegna	
1991	Robin Hood: Prince of Thieves	Little John	Nick Brimble	
1992	The Playboys	Tom Casey	Aidan Quinn	
1992	The Hand That Rocks the Cradle	Solomon	Ernie Hudson	
1992	Candyman	Daniel Robitaille / Candyman	Tony Todd	
1992	Article 99	Dr. Richard Sturgess	Ray Liotta	
1992	Unlawful Entry	Pete Davis	Ray Liotta	
1992	Reservoir Dogs	Larry Dimmick / Mr. White	Harvey Keitel	
1992	Love Crimes	David Hanover	Patrick Bergin	
1992	Captain Ron	Captain Ron Rico	Kurt Russell	
1992	The Last of the Mohicans	Nathaniel "Hawkeye" Poe	Daniel Day-Lewis	
1992	1492: Conquest of Paradise	Adrián de Moxica	Michael Wincott	
1993	Posse	Jesse Lee	Mario Van Peebles	
1993	The Adventures of Huck Finn	The Duke	Robbie Coltrane	
1993	Blink	John Hallstrom	Aidan Quinn	
1993	Map of the Human Heart	Walter Russell	Patrick Bergin	
1993	Son of the Pink Panther	Hans Zarba	Robert Davi	
1994	Silent Fall	Mitch Rivers	J. T. Walsh	
1994	Léon: The Professional	Léon	Jean Reno	
1994	Speed	Harry Temple	Jeff Daniels	
1994	Blown Away	Jimmy Dove	Jeff Bridges	
1994	Natural Born Killers	Jack Scagnetti	Tom Sizemore	
1994	Richie Rich	Laurence Van Dough	John Larroquette	
1994	Major League II	Jake Taylor	Tom Berenger	
1994	Drop Zone	Ty Moncrief	Gary Busey	
1994	Serial Mom	Detective Gracey	Walt MacPherson	
1994	Highlander III: The Sorcerer	Kane	Mario Van Peebles	
1994	Nell	Dr. Jerome "Jerry" Lovell	Liam Neeson	
1995	Othello	Othello	Laurence Fishburne	
1995	Smoke	Cyrus Cole	Forest Whitaker	
1995	Candyman: Farewell to the Flesh	Daniel Robitaille / Candyman	Tony Todd	
1995	Kiss of Death	Calvin Hart	Samuel L. Jackson	
1995	Dead Man	Conway Twill	Michael Wincott	
1995	Strange Days	Max Peltier	Tom Sizemore	
1995	Nine Months	Sean Fletcher	Jeff Goldblum	
1995	Species	Preston Lennox	Michael Madsen	
1996	Fled	Charles Piper	Laurence Fishburne	
1996	The Substitute	Jonathan Shale	Tom Berenger	
1996	The Rich Man's Wife	Tony Potenza	Christopher McDonald	
1996	Independence Day	David Levinson	Jeff Goldblum	
1996	Jerry Maguire	Matt Cushma	Beau Bridges	
1996	Striptease	Al Garcia	Armand Assante	
1996	The Funeral	Gaspare Spoglia	Benicio del Toro	
1996	Space Jam	Michael Jordan	Michael Jordan	
1996	Night Falls on Manhattan	Joey Allegretto	James Gandolfini	
1996	Black Sheep	Al Donnelly	Tim Matheson	
1997	Witch Way Love	Molok Edramareck	Jean Reno	
1997	Mad City	Alvin Lemke	Ted Levine	
1997	The Devil's Advocate	Alexander Cullen	Craig T. Nelson	
1997	Wag the Dog	Senator John Neal	Craig T. Nelson	
1997	Batman & Robin	Bruce Wayne / Batman	George Clooney	
1997	Titanic	J. Bruce Ismay	Jonathan Hyde	
1997	Event Horizon	Captain S. J. Miller	Laurence Fishburne	
1997	Hoodlum	Ellsworth "Bumpy" Johnson	Laurence Fishburne	
1997	L.A. Confidential	Jack Vincennes	Kevin Spacey	
1997	The Borrowers	Ocious P. Potter	John Goodman	
1997	Con Air	Nathan "Diamond Dog" Jones	Ving Rhames	
1997	Alien Resurrection	Ron Johner	Ron Perlman	
1997	Volcano	Mike Roark	Tommy Lee Jones	
1997	The Relic	Vincent D'Agosta	Tom Sizemore	
1997	One Eight Seven	Trevor Garfield	Samuel L. Jackson	
1997	Eve's Bayou	Louis Batiste	Samuel L. Jackson	
1997	Speed 2: Cruise Control	John Geiger	Willem Dafoe	
1997	The Fifth Element	Korben Dallas	Bruce Willis	
1997	Face	Dave	Ray Winstone	
1997	Oscar and Lucinda	Narrator	Geoffrey Rush	
1998	A Murder of Crows	Clifford Dubose	Tom Berenger	
1998	A Civil Action	Al Love	James Gandolfini	
1998	Species II	Preston Lennox	Michael Madsen	
1998	City of Angels	Cassiel	Andre Braugher	
1998	Hurlyburly	Mickey	Kevin Spacey	
1998	Shakespeare in Love	Richard Burbage	Martin Clunes	
1999	The World Is Not Enough	Valentin Zukovsky	Robbie Coltrane	
1999	The Hurricane	Jimmy Williams	Clancy Brown	
1999	Ghost Dog: The Way of the Samurai	Ghost Dog	Forest Whitaker	
1999	Light It Up	Dante Jackson	Forest Whitaker	
1999	The Insider	Jeffrey Wigand	Russell Crowe	
1999	House on Haunted Hill	Steven H. Price	Geoffrey Rush	
1999	The Matrix	Morpheus	Laurence Fishburne	
1999	Arlington Road	Michael Faraday	Jeff Bridges	
1999	The Best Man	Lance Sullivan	Morris Chestnut	
1999	The Thomas Crown Affair	Detective Paretti	Frankie Faison	
2000	Bait	Edgar Clenteen	David Morse	
2000	Pitch Black	Richard B. Riddick	Vin Diesel	
2000	Battlefield Earth	Ker	Forest Whitaker	
2000	Little Nicky	Cassius	Tommy Lister Jr.	
2000	Billy Elliot	George Watson	Mike Elliott	
2001	The Lord of the Rings: The Fellowship of the Ring	Boromir	Sean Bean	
2001	Scenes of the Crime	Jimmy Berg	Jeff Bridges	
2001	K-PAX	Dr. Mark Powell	Jeff Bridges	
2001	From Hell	Sergeant Peter Godley	Robbie Coltrane	
2001	Planet of the Apes	Colonel Attar	Michael Clarke Duncan	
2001	The Curse of the Jade Scorpion	Herb Coopersmith	Michael Mulheren	
2001	Wasabi	Hubert Fiorentini	Jean Reno	
2001	Just Visiting	Thibault	Jean Reno	
2001	The Fast and the Furious	Dominic Toretto	Vin Diesel	
2001	Green Dragon	Addie	Forest Whitaker	
2001	Ali	Howard Bingham	Jeffrey Wright	
2001	The Caveman's Valentine	Romulus Ledbetter	Samuel L. Jackson	
2001	Driven	Joe Tanto	Sylvester Stallone	
2001	One Night at McCool's	Detective Dehling	John Goodman	
2001	Session 9	Gordon Fleming	Peter Mullan	
2002	Jet Lag	Félix	Jean Reno	
2002	Hart's War	William McNamara	Bruce Willis	
2002	The Time Machine	David Philby	Mark Addy	
2002	A Walk to Remember	Reverend Hegbert Sullivan	Peter Coyote	
2002	D-Tox	Jake Malloy	Sylvester Stallone	
2002	Avenging Angelo	Frankie Delano	Sylvester Stallone	
2002	The Lord of the Rings: The Two Towers	Boromir	Sean Bean	
2002	Scooby-Doo	N'Goo Tuana	Steven Grieves	
2003	21 Grams	Jack Jordan	Benicio del Toro	
2003	The Matrix Reloaded	Morpheus	Laurence Fishburne	
2003	The Matrix Revolutions	Morpheus	Laurence Fishburne	
2003	Mystic River	Whitey Powers	Laurence Fishburne	
2003	The Order	Thomas Garrett	Mark Addy	
2003	Cold Mountain	Teague	Ray Winstone	
2003	Ruby & Quentin	Ruby	Jean Reno	
2003	Masked and Anonymous	Tom Friend	Jeff Bridges	
2003	Beyond Borders	Jan Steiger	Yorick van Wageningen	
2003	Spy Kids 3-D: Game Over	Sebastian "The Toymaker"	Sylvester Stallone	
2003	Shade	Dean "The Dean" Stevens	Sylvester Stallone	
2003	The Foreigner	John Hatcher	Steven Seagal	
2003	Freddy vs. Jason	Freddy Krueger	Robert Englund	
2003	Tears of the Sun	A.K. Waters	Bruce Willis	
2003	The Flower of Evil	Gérard Vasseur	Bernard Le Coq	
2003	Bringing Down the House	Widow	Steve Harris	
2004	Bad Education	Manuel Berenguer	Lluís Homar	
2004	The Chronicles of Riddick	Richard B. Riddick	Vin Diesel	
2004	The Merchant of Venice	Antonio	Jeremy Irons	
2004	Crimson Rivers II: Angels of the Apocalypse	Commissaire Niemans	Jean Reno	
2004	The Corsican File	Ange Leoni	Jean Reno	
2004	The Assassination of Richard Nixon	Harold Mann	Mykelti Williamson	
2004	Clementine	Jack Miller	Steven Seagal	
2004	King Arthur	Bors	Ray Winstone	
2004	Two Brothers	Saladin	Moussa Maaskri	
2004	National Treasure	Ian Howe	Sean Bean	
2004	Return to Sender	Frank Nitzche	Aidan Quinn	
2004	Alexander	Parmenion	John Kavanagh	
2005	Hostage	Jeff Talley	Bruce Willis	
2005	The Prophecy: Forsaken	Stark	Tony Todd	
2005	Kingdom of Heaven	King Richard I	Iain Glen	
2005	Broken Flowers	Winston	Jeffrey Wright	
2005	Mary	Ted Younger	Forest Whitaker	
2005	American Gun	Carter	Forest Whitaker	
2005	A Little Trip to Heaven	Abe Holt	Forest Whitaker	
2005	Miss Congeniality 2: Armed and Fabulous	Harry McDonald	Ernie Hudson	
2005	The Island	Jamal Starkweather / Starkweather Two Delta	Michael Clarke Duncan	
2005	Son of the Mask	Odin	Bob Hoskins	
2005	King Kong	Benjamin Hayes	Evan Parke	
2005	BloodRayne	Vladimir	Michael Madsen	
2005	Sin City	Jack "Iron Jack" Rafferty	Benicio del Toro	
2005	Flightplan	Marcus Rich	Sean Bean	
2005	The Pacifier	Shane Wolfe	Vin Diesel	
2005	Empire of the Wolves	Jean-Louis Schiffer	Jean Reno	
2005	Be Cool	Sin LaSalle	Cedric the Entertainer	
2005	The Honeymooners	Ralph Kramden	Cedric the Entertainer	
2005	The Interpreter	Charlie Russell	David Zayas	
2006	Rocky Balboa	Rocky Balboa	Sylvester Stallone	
2006	The Fast and the Furious: Tokyo Drift	Dominic Toretto	Vin Diesel	
2006	Five Fingers	Ahmat	Laurence Fishburne	
2006	Snakes on a Plane	Neville Flynn	Samuel L. Jackson	
2006	The Pink Panther	Gilbert Ponton	Jean Reno	
2006	Flyboys	Georges Thenault	Jean Reno	
2006	Fast Food Nation	Harry Rydell	Bruce Willis	
2006	Even Money	Clyde Snow	Forest Whitaker	
2007	Fantastic Four: Rise of the Silver Surfer	Silver Surfer	Laurence Fishburne	
2007	Evan Almighty	Congressman Chuck Long	John Goodman	
2007	Juno	Mac MacGuff	J. K. Simmons	
2007	Ripple Effect	Phillip	Forest Whitaker	
2007	Live!	Don	Andre Braugher	
2007	In the Name of the King	Gallian	Ray Liotta	
2007	The Golden Compass	John Faa	Jim Carter	
2008	Rambo	John Rambo	Sylvester Stallone	
2008	Cash	Maxime	Jean Reno	
2008	Iron Man	Obadiah Stane	Jeff Bridges	
2008	Babylon A.D.	Hugo Toorop	Vin Diesel	
2008	Speed Racer	Pops Racer	John Goodman	
2008	Tortured	Archie Green	Laurence Fishburne	
2008	Righteous Kill	David "Rooster" Fisk	Al Pacino	
2008	Passengers	Perry Jackson	Andre Braugher	
2008	Fool's Gold	Moe Fitch	Ray Winstone	
2008	Superhero Movie	Lou Landers / Hourglass	Christopher McDonald	
2009	Inside Ring	Milo Malakian	Jean Reno	
2009	The Pink Panther 2	Gilbert Ponton	Jean Reno	
2009	Fast & Furious	Dominic Toretto	Vin Diesel	
2009	Gamer	John "Kable" Tillman	Gerard Butler	
2009	Night at the Museum: Battle of the Smithsonian	Octavius	Steve Coogan	
2009	Broken Embraces	Mateo Blanco / Harry Caine	Lluís Homar	
2009	Transformers: Revenge of the Fallen	Ron Witwicky	Kevin Dunn	
2010	The Expendables	Barney Ross	Sylvester Stallone	
2010	Cliffhanger	Gabe Walker (2010 redub)	Sylvester Stallone	
2010	Percy Jackson & the Olympians: The Lightning Thief	Zeus	Sean Bean	
2010	Harry Potter and the Deathly Hallows – Part 1	Corban Yaxley	Peter Mullan	
2010	Our Family Wedding	Bradford Boyd	Forest Whitaker	
2010	Across the Line: The Exodus of Charlie Wright	Charlie Wright	Aidan Quinn	
2010	Icarus	Edward "Eddie" Genn / Icarus	Dolph Lundgren	
2010	22 Bullets	Charly Matteï	Jean Reno	
2010	Predators	Noland	Laurence Fishburne	
2011	Catch .44	Ronny	Forest Whitaker	
2011	Fast Five	Dominic Toretto	Vin Diesel	
2011	Tyrannosaur	Joseph	Peter Mullan	
2011	Margaret	Ramon Cameron	Jean Reno	
2011	Contagion	Dr. Ellis Cheever	Laurence Fishburne	
2011	Transformers: Dark of the Moon	Ron Witwicky	Kevin Dunn	
2011	Cross	Erlik	Michael Clarke Duncan	
2012	The Baytown Outlaws	Henry Millard	Andre Braugher	
2012	The Expendables 2	Barney Ross	Sylvester Stallone	
2012	Bullet to the Head	James "Jimmy Bobo" Bonomo	Sylvester Stallone	
2012	Great Expectations	Mr. Jaggers	Robbie Coltrane	
2012	Mirror Mirror	The King	Sean Bean	
2012	Freelancers	Dennis Lureu	Forest Whitaker	
2012	Ted	Narrator	Patrick Stewart	
2012	Arbitrage	Earl Monroe	Reg E. Cathey	
2012	Cloud Atlas	Various roles	Keith David	
2012	The Chef	Alexandre Lagarde	Jean Reno	
2012	Alex Cross	Giles Mercier	Jean Reno	
2012	Django Unchained	Stephen Warren	Samuel L. Jackson	
2012	Savages	Miguel "Lado" Arroyo	Benicio del Toro	
2012	Upside Down	Albert	Blu Mankuma	
2013	Death Race 3: Inferno	R. H. Weyland	Ving Rhames	
2013	Man of Steel	Perry White	Laurence Fishburne	
2013	Nymphomaniac	L	Willem Dafoe	
2013	Escape Plan	Ray Breslin	Sylvester Stallone	
2013	Grudge Match	Henry "Razor" Sharp	Sylvester Stallone	
2013	Jimmy P: Psychotherapy of a Plains Indian	Jimmy Picard	Benicio del Toro	
2013	The Great Gatsby	Meyer Wolfsheim	Amitabh Bachchan	
2013	The Best Man Holiday	Lance Sullivan	Morris Chestnut	
2013	The Last Stand	John Bannister	Forest Whitaker	
2013	Oldboy	Chaney	Samuel L. Jackson	
2013	Fast & Furious 6	Dominic Toretto	Vin Diesel	
2013	Riddick	Richard B. Riddick	Vin Diesel	
2013	The Art of the Steal	Crunch Calhoun	Kurt Russell	
2014	Hector and the Search for Happiness	Diego Baresco	Jean Reno	
2014	My Summer in Provence	Paul Mazuret	Jean Reno	
2014	Seventh Son	Master Gregory	Jeff Bridges	
2014	Inherent Vice	Sauncho Smilax	Benicio del Toro	
2014	Stretch	Ray Liotta	Ray Liotta	
2014	Reasonable Doubt	Clinton Davis	Samuel L. Jackson	
2014	RoboCop	Pat Novak	Samuel L. Jackson	
2014	Dawn of the Planet of the Apes	Caesar	Andy Serkis	
2014	The Expendables 3	Barney Ross	Sylvester Stallone	
2014	Guardians of the Galaxy	Groot	Vin Diesel	
2014	Ride Along	Omar	Laurence Fishburne	
2015	Creed	Rocky Balboa	Sylvester Stallone	
2015	Jupiter Ascending	Stinger Apini	Sean Bean	
2015	Pixels	Corporal Hill	Sean Bean	
2015	The Martian	Mitch Henderson	Sean Bean	
2015	The Man from U.N.C.L.E.	Adrian Sanders	Jared Harris	
2015	Furious 7	Dominic Toretto	Vin Diesel	
2015	The Last Witch Hunter	Kaulder	Vin Diesel	
2015	Ted 2	Narrator	Patrick Stewart	
2015	Sicario	Alejandro Gillick	Benicio del Toro	
2015	Star Wars: Episode VII – The Force Awakens	Supreme Leader Snoke	Andy Serkis	
2016	Brothers of the Wind	Danzer	Jean Reno	
2016	The Visitors: Bastille Day	Godefroy Amaury de Malfête	Jean Reno	
2016	Batman v Superman: Dawn of Justice	Perry White	Laurence Fishburne	
2016	Passengers	Gus Mancuso	Laurence Fishburne	
2016	Independence Day: Resurgence	David Levinson	Jeff Goldblum	
2016	The Legend of Tarzan	George Washington Williams	Samuel L. Jackson	
2016	Arrival	Colonel G. T. Weber	Forest Whitaker	
2017	Guardians of the Galaxy Vol. 2	Stakar Ogord / Starhawk	Sylvester Stallone	
2017	Guardians of the Galaxy Vol. 2	Baby Groot	Vin Diesel	
2017	The Fate of the Furious	Dominic Toretto	Vin Diesel	
2017	Mes trésors	Patrick	Jean Reno	
2017	War for the Planet of the Apes	Caesar	Andy Serkis	
2017	Star Wars: Episode VIII – The Last Jedi	Supreme Leader Snoke	Andy Serkis	
2017	John Wick: Chapter 2	The Bowery King	Laurence Fishburne	
2017	Kong: Skull Island	Preston Packard	Samuel L. Jackson	
2018	Ant-Man and the Wasp	Bill Foster	Laurence Fishburne	
2018	The Mule	Warren Lewis	Laurence Fishburne	
2018	Bad Times at the El Royale	Father Daniel Flynn	Jeff Bridges	
2018	Avengers: Infinity War	Groot	Vin Diesel	
2018	Sicario: Day of the Soldado	Alejandro Gillick	Benicio del Toro	
2018	Escape Plan 2: Hades	Ray Breslin	Sylvester Stallone	
2018	Creed II	Rocky Balboa	Sylvester Stallone	
2018	Jurassic World: Fallen Kingdom	Ken Wheatley	Ted Levine	
2018	The Christmas Chronicles	Santa Claus	Kurt Russell	
2019	Escape Plan: The Extractors	Ray Breslin	Sylvester Stallone	
2019	Rambo: Last Blood	John Rambo	Sylvester Stallone	
2019	John Wick: Chapter 3 – Parabellum	The Bowery King	Laurence Fishburne	
2019	Avengers: Endgame	Groot	Vin Diesel	
2019	Star Wars: Episode IX – The Rise of Skywalker	Supreme Leader Snoke	Andy Serkis	
2020	Bloodshot	Ray Garrison / Bloodshot	Vin Diesel	
2020	Da 5 Bloods	Desroche	Jean Reno	
2020	Rogue City	Ange Leonetti	Jean Reno	
2020	The Christmas Chronicles 2	Santa Claus	Kurt Russell	
2021	F9: The Fast Saga	Dominic Toretto	Vin Diesel	
2022	Samaritan	Joe Smith / Samaritan / Nemesis	Sylvester Stallone	
2022	Thor: Love and Thunder	Groot	Vin Diesel	
2022	The School for Good and Evil	School Master Rhian	Laurence Fishburne	
2023	Expend4bles	Barney Ross	Sylvester Stallone	
2023	Guardians of the Galaxy Vol. 3	Stakar Ogord / Starhawk	Sylvester Stallone	
2023	Guardians of the Galaxy Vol. 3	Groot	Vin Diesel	
2023	Fast X	Dominic Toretto	Vin Diesel	
2023	John Wick: Chapter 4	The Bowery King	Laurence Fishburne	
2023	The Flash	Bruce Wayne / Batman	George Clooney	
2024	Lift	Lars Jorgenson	Jean Reno	
2024	Family Pack	Gilbert Vassier	Jean Reno	
2024	Megalopolis	Fundi Romaine	Laurence Fishburne	

==== Television (Animation, Italian dub) ====
Year	Title	Role(s)	Notes	Ref
1982	Here Comes Garfield	Hubert	TV special	
1982	Here Comes Garfield	Fluffy	TV special	
1982	Here Comes Garfield	Man on TV	TV special	
1985–1991	Adventures of the Gummi Bears	Sir Tuxford	Recurring role	
1988–1991	The New Adventures of Winnie the Pooh	Owl	Main cast	
1991–1998	The Simpsons	Principal Skinner	Recurring role (seasons 5–8)	
1991–1998	The Simpsons	Sideshow Bob	1 episode (episode 1x12)	
1991–1998	The Simpsons	Roscoe	1 episode (episode 8x15)	
1992	Goof Troop	Pete	Main cast	
1994–1995	New Cutie Honey	Dolmeck	Recurring role	
1994–1995	Aladdin	Mukhtar	Recurring role	
1995	Timon & Pumbaa	Ralph	1 episode	
1995–1996	Iron Man	Tony Stark / Iron Man	Main cast (season 2)	
1999–2000	Mickey Mouse Works	Pete	Main cast	
1999–2001	Mike, Lu & Og	Mr. Goat	Recurring role	
2000	Neon Genesis Evangelion	Gendo Ikari	Main cast (1st edition)	
2001–2003	House of Mouse	Pete	Main cast, originally voiced by Jim Cummings	
2001–2003	House of Mouse	Beast	Recurring role, originally voiced by Robby Benson	
2001–2003	House of Mouse	Jafar	Recurring role, originally voiced by Jonathan Freeman	
2001–2003	House of Mouse	Gram-Gram Peg-Leg	1 episode, originally voiced by Jim Cummings	
2001–2003	The Book of Pooh	Owl	Main cast	
2001–2003	The Mummy	Imhotep	Main cast	
2004–2006	Super Robot Monkey Team Hyperforce Go!	Skeleton King	Main cast	
2006–2010	Mickey Mouse Clubhouse	Pete	Main cast (seasons 1–2)	
2010-2021	Family Guy	Jafar	1 episode (9.17)	
2010-2021	Family Guy	Vin Diesel	1 episode (season 16, episode 11)	
2010-2021	Family Guy	Sylvester Stallone	1 episode (season 19, episode 3)	
2010-2021	Family Guy	John Candy	1 episode (season 19, episode 10)	
2011–2013	Crash Canyon	Reginald Manderbelt	Recurring role	
2015–2019	Guardians of the Galaxy	Groot	Main cast	
2016	Trollhunters: Tales of Arcadia	Bular	Main cast (season 1)	
2019	Marvel Super Hero Adventures	Groot	1 episode (episode 3x02)	
2021	Invincible	Mauler Twins	Recurring role (season 1)	

==== Television (Live action, Italian dub) ====
Year	Title	Role(s)	Notes	Original actor	Ref
1992–1997	Beverly Hills, 90210	Jim Walsh	Recurring role (seasons 1–7)	James Eckhouse	
1993	Last Light	Fred Whitmore	TV film	Forest Whitaker	
1998–1999	Earth 2	John Danziger	Main cast	Clancy Brown	
2005	Carnivàle	Brother Justin Crowe	Main cast	Clancy Brown	
2006–2009	Prison Break	Brad Bellick	Main cast (seasons 1–4)	Wade Williams	
2009–2011	CSI: Crime Scene Investigation	Raymond Langston	Recurring role (seasons 9–11)	Laurence Fishburne	
2009–2015	Sons of Anarchy	Bobby Munson	Main cast	Mark Boone Junior	
2010	The Lost Future	Amal	TV film	Sean Bean	
2011	Game of Thrones	Ned Stark	10 episodes	Sean Bean	
2011	CSI: Miami	Raymond Langston	1 episode (episode 8x07)	Laurence Fishburne	
2011	CSI: NY	Raymond Langston	1 episode (episode 6x07)	Laurence Fishburne	
2012	Missing	Paul Winstone	Main cast	Sean Bean	
2012–2013	Last Resort	Marcus Chaplin	Main cast	Andre Braugher	
2013	Jo	Jo Saint-Clair	Main cast	Jean Reno	
2013	Golden Boy	Don Owen	Main cast	Chi McBride	
2013–2015	Hannibal	Jack Crawford	Main cast	Laurence Fishburne	
2013–present	Chicago Fire	Wallace Boden	Main cast	Eamonn Walker	
2014	Black Sails	Singleton	Guest role (season 1)	Anthony Bishop	
2014–present	Chicago P.D.	Wallace Boden	12 episodes	Eamonn Walker	
2015–2016	Legends	Martin Odum	Main cast	Sean Bean	
2016	Roots	Alex Haley	TV miniseries	Laurence Fishburne	
2016–2017	Gotham	Nathaniel Barnes	Recurring role (seasons 2–3)	Michael Chiklis	
2016–present	Chicago Med	Wallace Boden	4 episodes	Eamonn Walker	
2017	Chicago Justice	Wallace Boden	1 episode	Eamonn Walker	
2018–2022	Black-ish	Earl "Pops" Johnson	Recurring role	Laurence Fishburne	
2021	Call My Agent!	Jean Reno	1 episode	Jean Reno	
2021–2022	Who Killed Sara?	Reinaldo Gómez de la Cortina	Recurring role	Jean Reno	
2022–present	Tulsa King	Dwight "The General" Manfredi	Main cast	Sylvester Stallone	
2023–present	The Family Stallone	Sylvester Stallone	Main cast	Sylvester Stallone	

==== Video games (Italian dub) ====
Year	Title	Role(s)	Ref
2000	Disney's Aladdin in Nasira's Revenge	Jafar	
2003	Finding Nemo	Bloat	
2004	The Incredibles	Lucius Best / Frozone	
2005	The Incredibles: Rise of the Underminer	Lucius Best / Frozone	
2010	Fallout: New Vegas	Joshua Graham	
2011	Kinect: Disneyland Adventures	Beast	
2016	Lego Star Wars: The Force Awakens	Supreme Leader Snoke	
2016	Overwatch	Doomfist	
2023	Overwatch 2	Doomfist	
