= Grazia Nidasio =

Italian illustrator (1931–2018)

- Born: 9 February 1931; Milan, Italy
- Died: 25 December 2018 (aged 87); Certosa di Pavia, Italy
- Occupation: Comic artist

Grazia Nidasio (9 February 1931 – 25 December 2018) was an Italian comic artist and illustrator.

== Life and career ==
Born in Milan, Nidasio graduated from the Liceo scientifico in her hometown and later from the Brera Academy. In the 1950s she started a long collaboration with the children magazine Corriere dei Piccoli, for which she worked for over 35 years, creating a large number of popular characters, starting from Alibella and Gelsomino. She is best known for the series Valentina Mela Verde and its spin-off Stefi, which between late 1960s and early 1990s recounted in a realistic, tender and humorous way the everyday life of two adolescent sisters of their time. Her comics have been published in a number of countries, including France, Brazil and Argentina.

Nidasio collaborated with Corriere della Sera as a cartoonist and an illustrator, and illustrated numerous children books, including several Astrid Lindgren's novels. She also worked in advertising, notably creating the Piccolo mugnaio bianco ("Little white miller") character, i.e. the mascot of the 1980s Mulino Bianco advertising campaigns.

During her career Nidasio was recipient of numerous awards, including the Yellow Kid Award in 1972 and the Premio Andersen in 1987 and in 2001.
