= Gennaro Cannavacciuolo =

Italian actor (1962–2022)

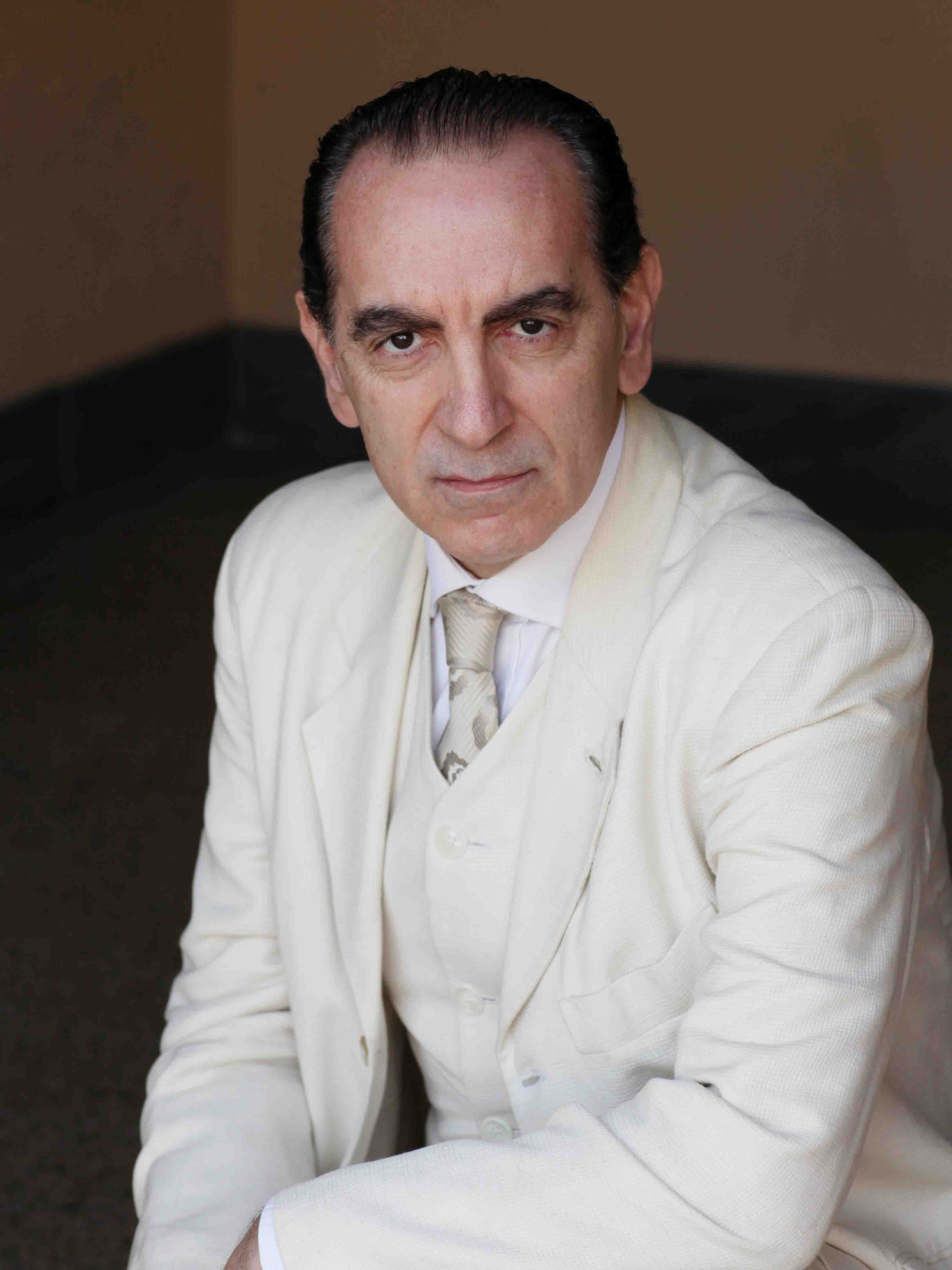
- Born: 14 February 1962; Pozzuoli, Italy
- Died: 24 May 2022 (aged 60); Rome, Italy
- Occupations: Actor, comedian, singer
- Years active: 1984–2022

Gennaro Cannavacciuolo (14 February 1962 – 24 May 2022) was an Italian actor, singer, and comedian. He is known for his roles in Un'estate al mare and La vita è una cosa meravigliosa.
