= Rat-Man (comics) =

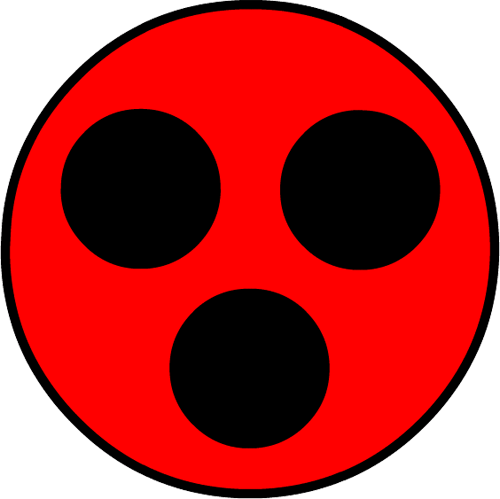
- Rat-Man logo

Publication information
- Publisher: Panini Comics (formerly Marvel Italia and part of Marvel Comics)
- First appearance: Spot 2, supplement to L'Eternauta #86 of June 1990
- Created by: Leo Ortolani

In-story information
- Alter ego: Deboroh La Roccia
- Team affiliations: None
- Notable aliases: Rat-Boy; Zappo, L'Uomo Imbarazzante ("Zappo the Embarrassing Man"); Marvelmouse
- Abilities: None. On the contrary, he sports a complete lack of common sense or other forms of intelligence.

Rat-Man is an Italian comic book about an inept superhero of the same name, created by Leonardo Ortolani in 1989. Although it was initially meant to be a satire of other superheroes, most prominently Batman, it has since evolved into an independent comic sporting a complex, evolving continuity. The comic is well known for its nonsense humor à-la Monty Python, its engaging storytelling and its frequent breaking of the fourth wall. Ortolani often pays both direct and indirect tribute to other comic authors (Jack Kirby above everyone else) and he frequently makes his characters use pop-culture references, either generic or specific to the native Italian context and background. The comic was published by Panini Comics as new installments under the name of Rat-Man Collection (closed with issue #122) and is currently being published as reprints of older stories in Rat-Man Gigante.

== Publishing history ==
The character of Rat-Man appeared for the first time in the second issue of Spot, a supplement to the Italian magazine L'Eternauta #86 of June 1990, shortly after Leonardo Ortolani won a young artists' contest. From 1990 to 1995 Rat-Man was published on the fanzine Made in USA. After the debut, Leo Ortolani chose to self-publish the comic alongside his primary job as a geologist; however, in 1997 Leo signed a contract with Marvel Italia, today a brand owned by Panini Comics (and, at the time, a branch of Marvel Comics itself), to publish the comic under the Marvel brand, which allowed Leonardo to become a full-time comics author. The contract also allowed him to use popular Marvel characters like Captain America, Wolverine, Doctor Doom and Elektra in Rat-Man stories; however, copyright problems have since prohibited such use of characters in the Rat-Man world.

Leo Ortolani stated his intention to close the series with issue #100.

He later on remarked how this was a joke not to be taken seriously (as on Rat-Man #92), and that the series would have ended after #100. In fact, in 2016, Ortolani stated his intention to really close the series with issue #122, which was published around September 2017 effectively closing the main Rat-man saga.

In 2022, Panini Comics published Rat-Man Saga, a collected edition in twelve hardcover volumes, also available in three box sets.

== Structure of the Comic ==
Rat-Man was born as a parody of Batman, which is reflected in his name, in his gadgets and in the details of his first story. For example, while Bruce Wayne took inspiration from a bat coming through his window, Deboroh took inspiration after a similar search from his weekly Mickey Mouse comic. They both lost their parents at a young age, both vowed to fight crime to avenge them and both inherited a large fortune with which they fund their activities. Rat-Man even had a sidekick named Topin (Topo, in Italian, means mouse) who was clearly inspired by Robin. Rat-Man's stories were initially either classical superhero stories, with the main character fighting various supervillains to save his city, or, sometimes, the world, or parodies of famous works of fiction. Sometimes, there would be stories revealing Rat-Man's past and troubled origins as a superhero. Lately, the "normal" superhero stories have been abandoned in favour of telling his present problems as he struggles to find his identity. The parody stories continue as usual, often used to break between story arcs.

Among the parodied works, there are Star Trek, Star Wars, 300, Titanic, The Lord of the Rings trilogy, 007, and many others.

== Summary of Rat-Man adventures ==
=== Before Rat-Boy ===
In Rat-Man's universe, two entities fight against each other: the Light, representing all that is good and pure, and the Shadow, a force of evil and corruption. After the Second World War, the First Secret Squad, a team of superheroes led by the Pipistrello (bat), combats for truth and justice backed by the Light, in an age of great prosperity and peace. After this failure, in 1954, the Shadow abandons the current vessel it had to take the body of the criminal boss Boda Valker, and contaminates his son, Janus, as well. Despite the best efforts of Samuel Krik, then a simple cop but already affiliated with the Light, the child is irremediably corrupted, and is taken by his father to be trained as his successor.

Under Boda's leadership, the Shadow instills fear in the heart of the No Name Country, who starts to doubt the superheroes. Feeling that they are manipulated, the First Secret Squad quits and is subsequently killed by the traitor Lupo (wolf) in 1965. Two years later, Deboroh la Roccia is born.

=== Rat-Boy ===
Deboroh is not an intelligent child, but he is well-meaning and willing to become a superhero after reading their adventures in comic books. He is taken to an orphanage after being lost by his parents in a mall sale, and he is rescued by Janus Valker, who believes him to be his son. However, this is a lie installed in his mind by his brother, the insane Joba, in order to control him and make him weak with affection for someone else. Janus falls for it and becomes attached to the child, despite being very stupid. The young Deboroh still carries his dream to become a superhero.

In the meantime, the Shadow, through its agents and the scientific research centre Elsewhere in which Janus also works, is planning the Second Secret Squad in order to control the nation and influence it. Since the program involves total anonymity, Janus has Deboroh join it as Rat-Boy as a way to fulfill his wish to become a superhero and protect him from the Shadow, who is constantly seeking to further corrupt him. The Second Squad, led by Wolf, however, fails to unite the nation and is seen as a tool of the government. They also clash with the Men in Tights, heroes who spontaneously embraced the teachings of the First Secret Squad and consider themselves the true heirs of their legacy. The No Name Country loses faith in superheroes.

In 1984, Rat-Boy quits the squad. Janus contacts him one last time after he discovers Joba's deception in order to erase from both minds any memory of the other. He hopes that by doing so they can escape and rebuild new lives. Unfortunately, after using the machine, Joba reaches them to kill them. The Shadow has abandoned Boda for the failure of the Second Squad, and his seeking a new vessel. Joba wants to make sure that he is chosen by eliminating Janus. In a bloody showdown, the two brothers clash and Joba is defeated. Janus buys Rat-Boy some time by embracing the Shadow and becoming its vessel, and letting him escape. Rat-Boy flees to No Name City, where the effects of the machine finally kick in and he forgets much about his past life. The Shadow loses track of him, and the only tool that it has to find him again is his mental track, which is hidden by Janus' wife, Kalissa, who has gone into hiding.

=== MarvelMouse ===
Deboroh becomes MarvelMouse, a superhero who fights in the Arena, a brutish coliseum where the last remaining superheroes fight for the crowd's amusement. Their kind is dying, being replaced by the newer and more stylish manga, but MarvelMouse's determination and goodwill convince one of the last agents of the Light, only known as Teacher, to end his reclusion and train him as a proper superhero. The Teacher, who had mentored the First Secret Squad, helps him embrace his potential, and MarvelMouse becomes Rat-Man.

In his last fight in the arena, Rat-Man is pitted against the Dragon, the greatest of the manga, who wants to kill him to end all superheroes. Just as he is defeated by him, Rat-Man realizes that his destiny is to help the nation, not to fight in the Arena. Before his demise he is saved by the other remaining superhero, the Man With A Spider Costume. With their triumph, the country remembers the superheroes and Rat-Man starts fighting crime.

However, Janus, who is now fully under the Shadow, seeks to destroy him with the Guardian, a colossal robot built to eliminate the First Squad and abandoned after the same goal was accomplished through other means. When the Guardian detects a new superhero, it is sent to kill him. In fact, it detected the rebirth of the Teacher as Pipistrello. Pipistrello had escaped the destruction of the Secret Squad and lived since then in hiding, blaming himself for the failure and death of his comrades. The Guardian kills him, but not before he leaves his legacy to Rat-Man.

=== Rat-Man ===
Though initially unwelcome, Rat-Man, with the help of Samuel Krik, becomes the last remaining superhero apart from the Second Secret Squad, which is still controlled by the Shadow. He starts protecting the city from many threats, such as the demon of desire Tefnut, the devourer of worlds Cosmicus and the publisher-gone-mad Spider. He inherits everything the Teacher had, including the wealthy Fuffa Corporation and butler Archibald, befriends Tadeus Brakko, and is the object of lust of transsexual Cinzia. This is the period when he is in his prime, and the animated series is set during it.

However, the Shadow still conspires to bring him down. Using the Buffoon, Rat-Man's first enemy, Janus Valker tries to destroy the Second Secret Squad in order to make space for the Third one. However, Rat-Man and his former teammates foil his plan, with all the others deciding to quit crimefighting after the confrontation. Rat-Man remains as the only superhero.

A while later, Kalissa uses the mental track to contact Rat-Man and convince him to participate in a cloning program led by the former scientists of Elsewhere. The project is to create an army of clones of Rat-Man to act as a powerful force of good, but the plan goes awry when Number Six, one of the clones, mutates and gains too much conscience. He frees the original Rat-Man, who stops the program. Hindered, Kalissa and the other scientists contact Janus to seek his help with the project, but they are unaware of how much he has changed.

Valker has fully embraced the Shadow and wallows in the complete knowledge it offered to him. However, the Shadow still conceals some information from him, and Janus, who craves omniscience, is forced to seek Rat-Man on its quest to gain it. When the other scientists find the Shadow and reveal that they have the mental track, he takes it away from them and murders them brutally. After making sure that Rat-Man is completely unaware of their shared past, he deletes that information from his brain as well.

=== Demise and Rebirth ===
Rat-Man, in 2003, enters a coma which he comes out of in 2005. In the meantime, the city has forgotten him and replaced him with many new superheroes, and he struggles to fit in again. All the new superheroes, however, flee when the Guardian, sensing activity of the Light, returns to the No Name City. Rat-Man realizes that the existence of a supervillain is inextricably tied to the presence of a superhero, and, being the last one, he stops donning a mask to save the city. Without a purpose, he retires to private life.

This is in fact a ploy orchestrated by Valker, who is slowly destroying him. After robbing him of his secret identity, he drives the Fuffa Corporation to bankruptcy and undermines the faith of the nation in superheroes. Rat-Man tries to return with an animated series but it is shallow and it worsens his conditions. He becomes a hobo, ready to be devoured by the Shadow, but with the help of Krik, Brakko, Cinzia and his fan club, he overcomes it. Janus is further stopped by the last lingering memory of being Deboroh's father, his last sliver of humanity which prevents him from taking the life of his adopted son.

Though he has defeated the Shadow, Rat-Man still struggles to return to his golden years and travels to New York to seek counsel from its superheroes, the comic book adventures of which inspired him to become one in the first place. After meeting them, however, he understands something is wrong: the villains are all gone, and the superheroes ostracize Wallcrawler, one of the more famous ones, for some obscure reason. Rat-Man finds out that they have all exhausted their purpose and are remaining fearing what lies beyond and addicted to their power. Rat-Man's efforts finally convince them to follow their due course and retire willingly, with parting advice to him: when all the fights are over, they should know when to stop and not be afraid of stepping out. Full of hope, Rat-Man returns to No Name City.

=== The extinction of superheroes ===
In 2014 the police and the government have decided to ban superheroes. While the superheroes become less, the Shadow begins its ruthless hunting in search of Rat-Man. Rat-Man, however, is rescued by the ancient scientist Jorgesson, former assistant of Janus Valker, who takes him to his laboratory showing him a weapon, called "Gigioni", capable of fighting the Shadow. So Rat-Man manages to save Janus by bringing him back to the real world, but losing in the clash Jorgesson and Gigioni; Rat-Man himself also fails to return. Janus Valker wakes up and finds his beloved Kalissa at his bedside. She reveals to him that his son Deboroh has struggled in the abyss against the Shadow but has lost and the Shadow has taken possession of Rat-Man's body.

=== The decalogy of the end ===
The Shadow has taken possession of Rat-Man's body and is trying to conquer the world by creating a sort of religious cult with messianic outlines. But Valker has returned more pure than ever, hairless and dressed only in a white veil, to counter the Shadow. Meanwhile, it turns out that Thea, the only woman who Rat-Man ever truly loved, was actually a clone of Aima, a young scientist with whom Rat-Man had fallen in love, while she tried to awaken his latent heroism. Rat-Man and Aima had time to conceive a child, called Thea. So Valker realizes that there is only one way to defeat the Shadow: give back his lost love to Rat-Man. Valker manages to reunite him with his lost daughter. Reconciled with his daughter, Rat-Man manages to free himself from the control of the Shadow.

Before the final battle with the Shadow begins, Rat-Man decides to confess his biggest lie: he had always known that Aima was still alive, but he had not looked for her in order to be a superhero. A ray of light makes its way through the darkness that covers the sky, revealing how to defeat the Shadow. The Shadow has become strong thanks to the loss of consciousness of the border between "right" and "wrong"; the awareness of faults and responsibilities weakens the Shadow. Rat-Man also understands that as he is able to hear the voices of all those who ask for help, they are able to hear him, and thanks to this link, he can reveal to everyone the way to defeat the Shadow. All follow the example of Rat-Man and the Shadow disappears.

Among the many voices heard by Rat-Man, however, there is also that of Thea, captured by Topìn, the last incarnation of the Shadow. Rat-Man reaches him and confronts him. Just when Rat-Man is about to be defeated, Thea feels compassion for her father and she calls him for the first time "dad" and Rat-Man defeats Topìn, who reveals that the Shadow will always return, unless Rat-Man kills him. His evil laugh is interrupted by Valker, who does not mind to eliminate it once and for all.

The last scenes tell of the marriage between Rat-Man and Aima. Then Rat-Man throws himself from a palace accompanied by Thea, wearing a Rat-Girl costume.

== Main characters ==
=== Rat-Man ===
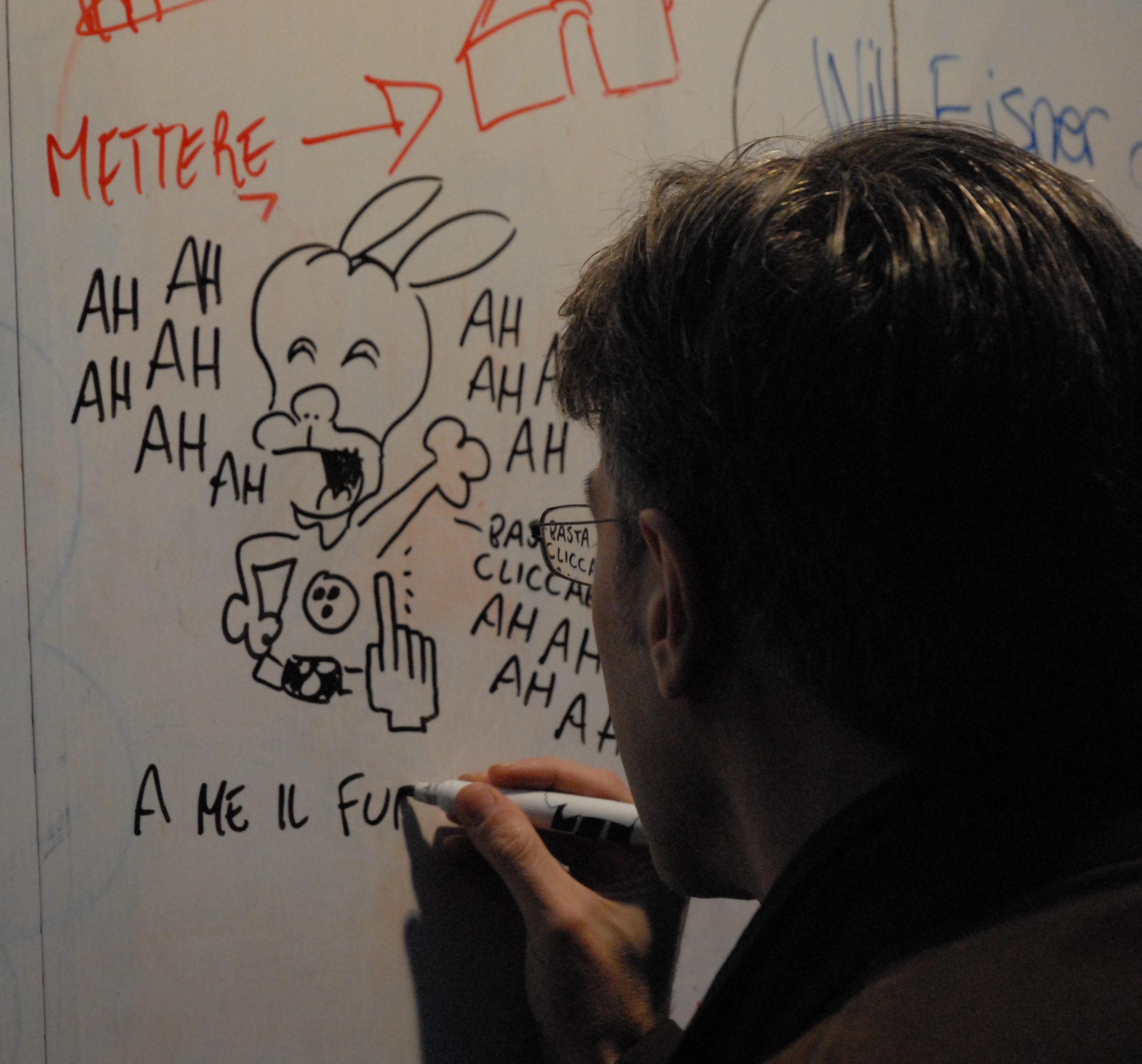
Leo Ortolani draws Rat-Man on Wikimedia Italia Wikiwall during Lucca Comics&Games 2010.

Rat-Man, also known as Rat-Boy, Marvelmouse, Deboroh Valker, and Deboroh la Roccia, is always the main protagonist of the story. He has no powers, abilities, and limited intelligence (compared to similar main characters), but his goodwill and kind heartedness compensate for this. Although he isn't very clever or strong, he has somehow managed to fend off many terrible threats against No Name City. Due to his character taking inspiration from a mouse, he harbors an unnatural and extremely violent hatred for cats.

=== Cinzia Otherside ===
Originally a postman with the name of Paul, she is a transgender woman who loves Rat-Man. Her coming out as such is deeply related with Marvelmouse's realization of being Rat-Man. She has tried to marry him and seduce him over the years, to no avail.

=== Tadeus Brakko ===
An African-American police inspector, he is Rat-Man's best friend, and easily his only one. He was the only person to support Rat-Man after coming out of the coma and he has great faith in him. Probably it helps their friendship that he is almost as dimwitted as Rat-Man himself, not even realizing, in certain circumstances, Rat-Man's racial prejudices against him. His wife, Clara, constantly cheats on him but loves him deeply as well. They have a son, who is in fact son of the postman. His physical appearance is based upon Danny Glover's character Sgt. Murtaugh in the Lethal Weapon series.

=== Captain Krik ===
Head of No Name City's police force, he often employs Rat-Man in missions and is a friend of his, although he is a lot more sceptical of his abilities than Brakko. When Rat-Man started to become a superhero, he was the only one in the police force to correctly identify him as an aid and not a threat to crime-fighting. During the second coming of the Cat, he willingly abandoned the city to train with the Light, the organization bent on stopping the Shadow. His return to the city is instrumental in saving Rat-Man from his own dark side. As the name suggests, he is based upon Captain Kirk of Star Trek fame.

=== Thea ===
The only woman who Rat-Man ever truly loved, she appeared in only one comic book, where she died. She was the most advanced experiment of Doctor Denam, who was also one of the authors of Abbard's Second Squad Project. The Doctor's plan was to create a super race of sentient vegetable humanoids. In the end, he was killed by his first creation, the imperfect Primus, and Rat-Man only managed to escape thanks to Thea, who Denam had created out of a rose. She dies in the end of that book, and her memory haunts Rat-Man forever. His lifelong struggle to find a partner ends then in pornography (twice), but Thea's image saves him from brutish desire. She also was his wife in a parallel universe, had things gone slightly differently, and she was never forgotten by Rat-Man, even appearing in his fantasy as his final dream at the age of 80.

=== Archibald ===
Rat-Man's butler, he is one of the very few who knows of his dual identity and activities. Despite Rat-Man's antics and stupidity, he always remains by his side and helps him, even when his master loses his fortune. He is another element that proves Rat-Man's origin as parody of Batman, as he is clearly inspired from Alfred Pennyworth.

== Notable Antagonists ==
=== Janus Valker ===
Rat-Man's nemesis was once his adoptive father, although now he is only the vessel for the Shadow. He and Rat-Man have clashed many times, with the hero always, in some way, emerging victorious. However, it is hinted in the stories that his good and compassionate self, who cared for Deboroh and tried to protect him, is still alive within Janus' conscience, and is till trying to protect his adoptive son. Janus' father, Boda Valker, was also a vessel for the Shadow.

=== The Shadow ===
An ominous and manipulative entity, the Shadow needs a body to control in order to live, in exchange for power or knowledge. The Shadow controls the Government of the Nation in which Rat-Man lives, and is constantly trying to tighten its grip on its citizens, mainly through the Superheroes and their Secret Squads. Three incarnations of this squad have been formed during the years to control the Nation. The current body is Janus Valker, although the Shadow has tried to corrupt Rat-Man to use as vessel.

=== The Buffoon ===
Rat-Man's very first enemy, he is a parody of Batman's Joker. He is later revealed to be Nottolo, the member of the Second Secret Squad who was kicked out to make space for Rat-Boy, and has always resented the hero for this.

=== The Spider ===
Bitten by a radioactive man, he acquired human characteristics such as greed and lack of scruples. He was a comic publisher until he was brought down by Rat-Man. The hero, later on, must travel in the past to defeat him again with the help of the poorly disguised Fantastic Four, as he was a temporal anomaly.

=== The Cat ===
She is the physical embodiment of pleasure and desire, and as such she is very dangerous and ruthless. She has been stranded on our world and tried to return to her sisters through a series of bloody and murderous rituals. The hero, however, managed to stop her.

=== MasterMouse ===
He is the creation of an unknown scientist and is a perfect replica of Ratman. His sole purpose is to aid in the destruction of Ratman and all he stands for. The hero has a difficult time trying to stop his archrival since they have the same powers.

== The Secret Squads ==
The First Secret Squad, a league of extraordinary individuals who fought crime during peacetime and in the Second World War, inspired a generation's dream for justice and helped control the Nation. The eventually disbanded when they felt that the Government, controlled by the Shadow, was trying too hard to manipulate them, and, for this defection, they were murdered. The original members are:

- Saetta (Lightning Bolt)
- Ripulitore (Cleaner)
- Fantasma Azzurro (Blue Ghost)
- Pipistrello (Bat)
- Tròteo (Troutish)

After fighting the Second World War, they accepted a younger Lupo (Wolf) as a new member. He was the only one to survive the murder, probably because he was an instrument of the Shadow, as it was later revealed.

The Second Secret Squad was made by genetically engineering the DNA of unborn babies, who were then trained to become a new Secret Squad and control the Nation instead of the Shadow. They were trying to emulate the older squad, and thus have similar names and costumes. They were

- Fulmine (Lightning, emulating Saetta)
- Tresh ("Trash", emulating Ripulitore)
- Spettro (Wraith, emulating Fantasma Azzurro)
- Nottolo (Noctule, emulating Pipistrello)
- Karpa (Karp, emulating Troteo).

Nottolo was almost immediately kicked out in favour of Rat-Man. The whole squad was led by Lupo, but they failed to create the same kind of national unity that the First Squad achieved and disbanded.

The Shadow, however, didn't give up on the project and prepared a Third Secret Squad, who is only seen on a poster shown by Janus Valker. In order to make space for the new one, the Shadow used Nottolo and Lupo to dispose of the Second Squad, but Rat-Man foiled their plan and the whole idea was finally abandoned. Spettro was originally and unwillingly chosen to be the leader of the Third Squad, as she was the daughter of Lupo. It is also thanks to her help that Rat-Man stops the sinister project.

== Animated series ==
An animated series, Rat-Man, was produced by the Italian public television company RAI and Stranemani Animation Studios from 2005 to 2006. It consists of 52 episodes, each 13 minutes long. The series aired on Saturday mornings in Italy and on occasional weekday afternoons in North America during the "Cartoni" segment on the RAI International satellite channel. The series focuses on the "normal" superhero routine of Rat-Man, who has to defeat various threats to No Name City, and is therefore located within the timeline after he has become Rat-Man and before he fell into a coma.

The makers of the Rat-Man series produced an animated feature film, Rat-Man - Il segreto del supereroe, which was released in 2007. It is divided into five episodes entitled "The Superhero", "Mousetrap", "Copyrat", "Fraudolent" and "To Rat or Not to Rat".

== See also ==
- Gli intoccabili
- L'ultima burba
- Venerdì 12
