= Belén Rodríguez =

Argentine television personality, actress and model

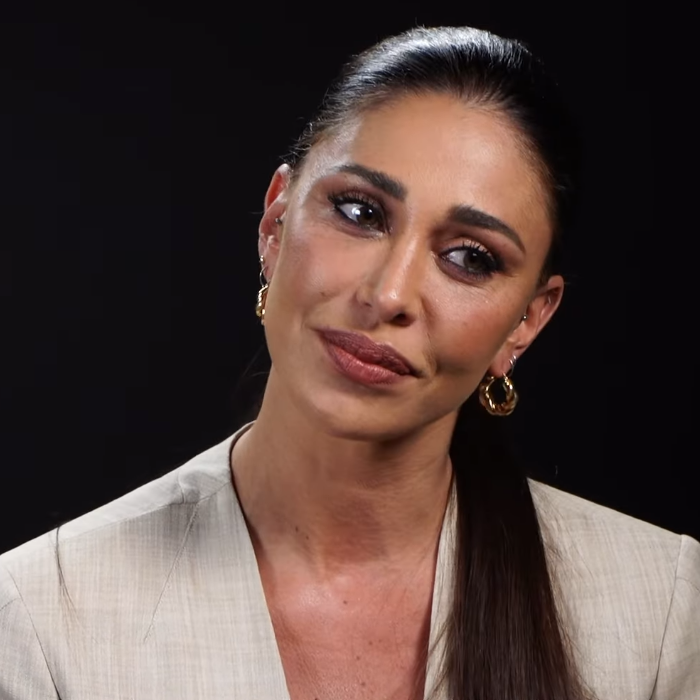
- Rodríguez in May 2024
- Born: Maria Belén Rodríguez; 20 September 1984 (age 42); Buenos Aires, Argentina
- Citizenship: Argentina; Italy
- Occupations: Model; television personality; television presenter; actress; singer
- Years active: 2001–present
- Height: 175 cm (5 ft 9 in)
- Spouse: Stefano De Martino (m. 2013; div. 2024)
- Partners: Marco Borriello (2004–2008); Fabrizio Corona (2009–2012); Andrea Iannone (2016–2018); Antonio Spinalbese (2020–2022); Elio Lorenzoni (2023–present)
- Children: 2
- Website: www.belenrodriguez.it

María Belén Rodríguez (Latin American Spanish: [maˈɾi.a βeˈlen roˈðɾiɣes]; born 20 September 1984), better known as Belén Rodríguez or simply Belén, is an Argentine-Italian television personality, actress and model. Based in Milan since 2004, Rodríguez has hosted variety shows and appeared in television commercials and films in Italy.

== Biography ==
=== Early life ===
Rodríguez was born on 20 September 1984 in Buenos Aires, Argentina, to Gustavo Rodríguez and Veronica Cozzani de Rodríguez. Veronica, of Italian origin, is the daughter of immigrants from La Spezia, in Liguria. Rodríguez has a younger brother, Jeremías, in addition to her younger sister Cecilia. At age 4, she moved to Pilar, Buenos Aires, with her family. Rodríguez' sister, Cecilia (born on 18 March 1990 in Pilar, Buenos Aires), has been a model in Italy since 2008. In January 2014, Cecilia became Belén's business partner. Jeremías, Gustavo and Veronica have lived in Milan since August 2015, and Jeremías (born on 11 November 1988 in Pilar) has been active in Italian show business since 2017.

=== Personal life ===
From August 2004 to December 2008, Rodríguez was the girlfriend of AC Milan footballer Marco Borriello. From January 2009 to April 2012, she was in a relationship with Fabrizio Corona; they broke up when she met dancer Stefano De Martino, whom she married. They had a son named Santiago on 9 April 2013 in Milan, and married on 20 September of that year. Rodríguez and De Martino separated on 22 December 2015, and divorced on 24 January 2017 after signing a judicial agreement at the Court of Milan; as part of the divorzio breve (fast-track divorce), De Martino was ordered to pay €1,000 per month in child support. They officially divorced in 2024. From September 2020 to January 2022 Rodríguez had a relationship with the hair-stylist Antonino Spinalbese: on 12 July 2021 their daughter, Luna Marì Spinalbese, was born.

== Career ==
She has lived in Italy since 2004, hosting variety shows and appearing in films and television commercials and programs. Considered a sex symbol of the 2000s and 2010s, Rodríguez posed in Italy for Playboy and several nude calendars. The tabloid press in Italy and abroad have closely followed her life and career.

The international press called Rodríguez "the Rioplatense Sophia Loren" and "the Italian Sara Carbonero". In February 2011 she hosted the Sanremo Music Festival, the festival's third Argentine host (after Valeria Mazza and Lola Ponce). Rodríguez has worked with Gerry Scotti, Maria De Filippi, Paolo Bonolis, Michelle Hunziker and Gianni Morandi.

=== Singing ===
During the run of Tintoria on Rai 3 in 2007, singer Taiyo Yamanouchi suggested that Rodríguez (Yamanouchi's co-host) pursue a musical career; however, she preferred to continue her modeling and acting career. Rodríguez appeared with Claudia Galanti in the Boyfriend video clip for Coolio's 2008 Steal Hear album.

During 2009, Rodríguez made her vocal debut with "Dai muovi muovi" by Mario Gardini, Giovanni Paolo Fontana and Roberto De Luca (the theme song of Sarabanda, hosted by the singer on Canale 5). The following February she sang Toto Cutugno's "Aeroplani" at the Teatro Ariston, which she also sang at the 2010 Sanremo Festival with Cutugno. Rodríguez (using the stage name Maria Belén) sang "Amarti è folle", written and arranged by Fortunato Zampaglione for the film Non c'è due senza te, at the Sanremo Music Festival 2015.

=== Acting ===
She made her acting debut during 2010 in the cinepanettone Natale in Sudafrica, directed by Neri Parenti and released on 17 December of that year. Rodríguez appeared in Se sei così, ti dico sì (directed by Eugenio Cappuccio and released on 15 April 2011) and the episode "Il campo del vasaio" of the Rai 1 television series Il commissario Montalbano, which premiered on 14 March 2011. Rodríguez guest starred in several episodes of the second season of Così fan tutte, an Italia 1 sitcom directed by Gianluca Fumagalli, in 2011–2012. She dubbed her voice in the animated film Gladiatori di Roma, directed by Iginio Straffi and released on 18 October 2012. During 2014 Rodríguez appeared in Non c'è 2 senza te, directed by Massimo Cappelli and released on 5 February 2015. In August 2015 Lux Vide and RAI Fiction announced that she would guest-star in "La colpa", a tenth-season episode of the Rai 1 TV series Don Matteo which premiered on 7 January 2016.

=== Business ===
Rodríguez introduced two perfumes in 2011: Belén Rodríguez (Gold) and Belén Rodríguez (Eau de Parfum). In January 2014 the Italian weekly magazine Il Mondo reported that she and Cecilia were founding the Family Factor, a company to oversee their family's Italian business activities. Arnoldo Mondadori Editore published Bella Belén, a photo-book, in early 2014. In June 2015 Rodríguez opened Ricci, a restaurant in Milan, with three partners. Around that time she opened beauty salons for Cotril, an Italian company in which she is a spokesperson and business partner. In December 2017, Ricci was closed and sold.

=== Modelling ===
In 2007, Rodríguez appeared with Elisabetta Canalis and Christian De Sica in the Telecom Italia (TIM) commercials as Donna dei Sogni (Dream Woman). Her collaboration with TIM continued until February 2011.

In February 2012, Rodríguez posed nude for the cover of the Italian edition of Vanity Fair. In July 2012 She also posed nude for the cover of the Italian edition of GQ, photographed by Douglas Kirkland. In May 2013, Rodríguez and Gerry Scotti became spokespeople for the "marriage" of Barilla and McDonald's. She debuted as a stylist for the Imperfect clothing line with Fabio Castelli. In June 2013, Rodríguez became spokesperson for the Bikini Lovers cruise-wear line created by fashion blogger Chiara Biasi. In October 2013, she and Cecilia presented the 2013–2014 Imperfect fashion line as models and stylists. In December, Rodríguez was the spokesperson for Javier Zanetti's Pupi Foundation and (with her husband, Stefano De Martino) for virtual application software created by WeChat.

As models and designers, in February 2014 Rodríguez and Cecilia presented Imperfect's third fashion line. That year, she posed for the cover of SportWeek. Rodríguez and Cecilia designed and produced Me Fui, a new beachwear line for 2014, and Belén became the spokesperson for Samsung mobile phones. During 2014, she was model and spokesperson (with Stefano De Martino) for Richmond Perfumes. In January 2015, John Richmond replaced Rodríguez with Venezuelan model Mariana Rodríguez for the Milan fashion shows. In September 2016, she lost the Vanitas line to Madalina Ghenea.

During 2005, Rodríguez first posed nude for the Vuemme Calendar 2006. She posed nude with three other models (Eva Collini, Ainett Stephens and Nena Ristić) for the De Nardi Calendar 2006. In 2006, Rodríguez posed nude for the Fer Calendar 2007. During 2007 and 2008, she posed nude for Maxim Calendars. In 2009, Rodríguez and Cecilia (in her modelling debut) posed nude for the Max Calendar 2010. Between late 2009 and early 2010, Vuemme published Calendar Vuemme 2010 (a reprint of the 2006 one). In 2010, Rodríguez posed for the Maxim and TIM calendars (her last calendars).

On 18 February 2009 Rodríguez said in a Corriere della Sera interview that several years earlier she declined an offer to pose nude for the cover of Playboy Miami, preferring to remain in Italy for a fashion shoot with an Emilian company. In early 2012, she became the face of the Arthur's Underwear lingerie line. Rodríguez, Alessandra Ambrosio and Shanina Shaik became the global spokespeople for Swarovski in August 2017.

During 2015, Paul Marciano chose Rodríguez as his flagship model and the worldwide spokesperson for Guess?. Marciano also used her for 2016 season and 2017. In 2016 In February 2017, Rodríguez posed for Jadea's spring–summer women's intimate and homewear collections. The following month, she endorsed the Foreyever eyeglass line. In July Rodríguez endorsed McDonald's, and endorsed Alessandro Angelozzi Couture's 2018 line of wedding dresses in October. She modelled at the 2018 Milan Fashion Week, for the Swarovski line (with Alessandra Ambrosio and Shanina Shaik), for Jadea's new line and (with Cecilia) for Me Fui's spring–summer 2018 line.

From May to July 2018, Rodríguez modelled and endorsed for RaNpollo, Hanny Deep, Comme Des Fkdown, Gaëlle Paris, and Pyrex. She worked again with Guess? and model Stefano Sala in Cefalù, Sicily.

=== Television ===
Rodríguez debuted on television in November 2006 on Tele Boario 1, Val Camonica's local television station. After signing with Paola Benegas, her first Italian agent in Italy, she debuted on Italian national television as co-host (with singer Taiyo Yamanouchi) of Rai 3's late-night comedy show La tintoria in 2007. That year, Rodríguez co-hosted the prime-time variety Circo Massimo Show with Fabrizio Frizzi. She appeared on 4 April 2008 episode (introducing 18-year-old Cecilia in her Italian television debut) of Rai 1's prime-time variety show I raccomandati, hosted by Carlo Conti and Alessia Ventura. That year, Rodríguez was a journalist and co-host (with Selvaggia Lucarelli), of Pirati, a late-night Rai 2 show. In 2008 Belén, after modelling for Max magazine several months earlier, Rodríguez appeared in the sixth season of L'isola dei famosi (a Rai 2 reality show hosted by Simona Ventura) and placed second.

In December 2008, she joined Lucio Presta's Arcobaleno Tre agency. During 2009, Rodríguez co-hosted (with Claudio Amendola and Teo Mammucari) the eleventh season of the prime-time variety show Scherzi a parte on Canale 5. From 2009 to 2011, she appeared in mobile-phone-network television commercials and modelled jewellery. During 2009 Rodríguez co-hosted (with Teo Mammucari) the Canale 5 quiz show Sarabanda, whose the theme song she recorded. She guest starred on 23 November episode of the 10th season of Italian Big Brother, a Canale 5 reality show hosted by Alessia Marcuzzi. In 2010, Rodríguez and Cecelia appeared on Italia 1's late-night Chiambretti Night variety show. She appeared on 18 February 2010 Sanremo Music Festival with singer Toto Cutugno.

In February 2011, Rodríguez co-hosted the Sanremo Music Festival 2011 with Gianni Morandi and Elisabetta Canalis. That year, she co-hosted Rai 1's Ciak ... si canta! with Francesco Facchinetti. Rodríguez appeared on Canale 5's variety show La notte degli chef, hosted by Alfonso Signorini. In 2011, she co-hosted the Italia 1 comedy show Colorado with Paolo Ruffini, Digei Angelo and Chiara Francini. Substituting for Ivana Mrázová, Rodríguez co-presented (with Elisabetta Canalis) during the first two evenings of the February Sanremo Music Festival 2012. She co-hosted Colorado with Paolo Ruffini, Digei Angelo, Elena Morali and Jiang Wei. The following year, Rodríguez and Stefano de Martino appeared on Canale 5's prime-time Studio 5.

In February 2014, during the Sanremo Music Festival, she appeared on RTL 102.5's Password and guest-starred on Rai 1's Domenica In – Speciale Sanremo. That year, Rodríguez hosted Italia 1's afternoon Come mi vorrei (the Italian version of Plain Jane) and guest-starred on Colorado. In May and June she danced on Italia 1's Chiambretti Supermarket, a late-night talk show and hosted by Piero Chiambretti. Rodríguez co-hosted the first season of Canale 5's Tú sí que vales with Francesco Sole. On 8 February 2015, she co-hosted the Canale 5 quiz show Avanti un altro! Pure di domenica... with Gerry Scotti.

In 2015, Rodríguez and Francesco Sole hosted the second season of Tú sí que vales. That year, she hosted the first season of the Canale 5 prime-time children's talent show Pequeños gigantes.

During the 2016–2017 season Rodríguez appeared on L'intervista, Nemicamatissima, C'è posta per te, Emigratis and the Maurizio Costanzo Show. In May and June 2017 Rodríguez appeared in the second season of Selfie – Le cose cambiano, hosted by Simona Ventura. She co-hosted the fourth season of Tú sí que vales; her co-host, Simone Rugiati, was replaced by Martin Castrogiovanni and Alessio Sakara. In October, Rodríguez guest-starred in the second season of Grande Fratello VIP and the fifth season of Chi ha incastrato Peter Pan?.

She guest-starred on the 17th season of the talent show Amici di Maria De Filippi with Maradona in April 2018, and with Michelle Hunziker in May. During the 2018 FIFA World Cup, Rodríguez appeared on the sports talk show Balalaika – Dalla Russia col pallone. She hosted the fifth season of Tú sí que vales.

== Awards ==
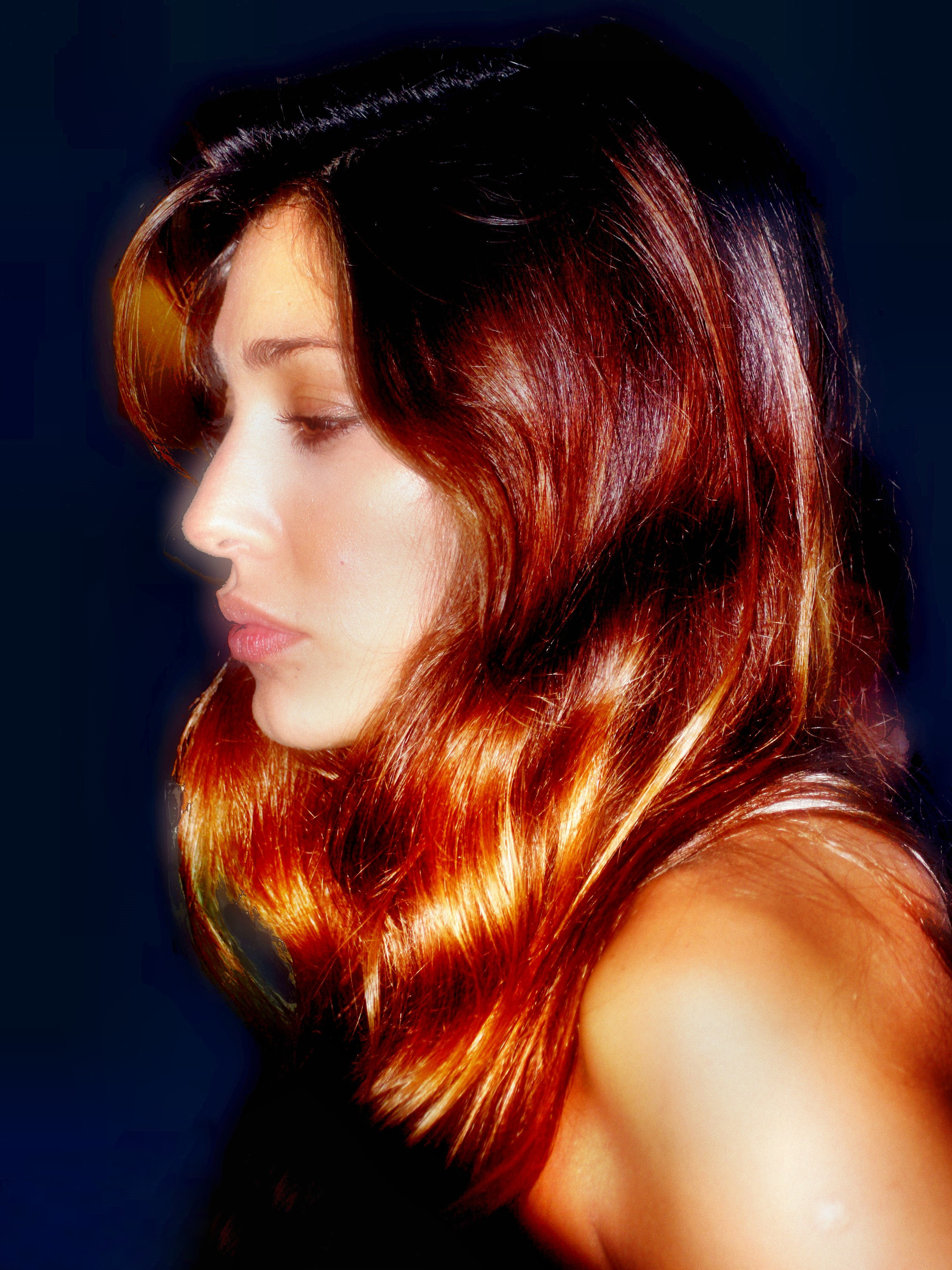
Rodríguez with brown hair

Year	Award	Work	Result
2011	Premio Regia Televisiva (Television Presenter Award)	Personaggio rivelazione dell'anno (TV personality of the year)	Won
2013	Accademia Amici della Lirica (Friends of the Opera Academy)	Donna dell'anno (Woman of the year)	Won
2014	Galà della Pubblicità (Gala of Advertising)	Eccellenza dell'anno (annual excellence)	Won
2015	San Gennaro Day (Januarius Day)	Opera d'arte vivente dell'anno (artwork of the year)	Won

== Filmography ==
=== Film ===
Year	Title	Role(s)	Notes
2010	Natale in Sudafrica	Angela Ladesse	
2011	La Bruxa	Ratón (voice)	Short film
2011	Se sei così ti dico sì	Talita Cortes	
2012	Gladiators of Rome	Diana (voice)	
2015	Non c'è due senza te	Laura Sanchez	
2017	Super vacanze di Natale	Herself	Cameo appearance

=== Television ===
Year	Title	Role(s)	Notes
2009	Così fan tutte	Belén	Episode: "Episode 5"
2011	Inspector Montalbano	Dolores Gutierrez	Episode: "Il campo del vasaio"
2016	Don Matteo	Celeste Martinez	Episode: "La colpa"

=== Video games ===
Year	Title	Role(s)	Notes
2010	ModNation Racers	Astro Kitty / Jill Vasquez	Spanish version

=== Other appearances ===
Year	Title	Role(s)	Network	Notes
2004–2005	No hay 2 sin 3	Co-host	El Nueve	Comedy program (seasons 1–2)
2007	La tintoria	Co-host	Rai 3	Variety show (season 2)
2007–2008	Verissimo	Reporter	Canale 5	Talk show (season 12)
2007–2010	Circo Massimo Show	Co-host	Rai 3	Variety show
2008	L'isola dei famosi	Contestant	Rai 2	Reality show (season 6)
2009	Scherzi a parte	Co-host	Canale 5	Prank/comedy show (season 11)
2009	Sarabanda	Co-host	Canale 5	Game show (season 10)
2011	Sanremo Music Festival 2011	Co-host	Rai 1	Annual music festival
2011–2019	Colorado	Presenter	Italia 1	Comedy program (seasons 11–12; 20)
2012	Sanremo Music Festival 2012	Co-host	Rai 1	Annual music festival
2012	Radio Italia Live: Il concerto	Presenter	Radio Italia TV	Annual event
2012–2013	Italia's Got Talent	Presenter	Canale 5	Talent show (seasons 3–5)
2014–2022	Tú sí que vales	Presenter	Canale 5	Talent show (seasons 1–9)
2015	Arena di Verona, lo spettacolo sta per iniziare	Co-host	Canale 5	Annual event
2016	Striscia la notizia	Guest host	Canale 5	Variety show (season 29)
2016	Pequeños gigantes	Presenter	Canale 5	Children's talent show (season 1)
2017	Selfie: Le cose cambiano	Reporter	Canale 5	Reality show (season 2)
2019	Sanremo Young	Judge	Rai 1	Talent show (season 2)
2019	Castrocaro Music Festival	Presenter	Rai 2	Annual music festival
2022–2023	Le Iene	Presenter	Italia 1	Variety show (seasons 25–26)
2024	Celebrity Hunted: Caccia all'uomo	Contestant	Amazon Prime Video	Reality show
