= Italia's Got Talent season 1 =

Italia's Got Talent
- Season 1
- Presented by: Simone Annicchiarico; Geppi Cucciari
- Judges: Rudy Zerbi; Maria De Filippi; Gerry Scotti
- Winner: Carmen Masola
- Runner-up: Federico Fattinger

Release
- Original network: Canale 5
- Original release: 12 April – 17 May 2010

Season chronology
- Next → Season 2

Judges for Italia's Got Talent Season 1

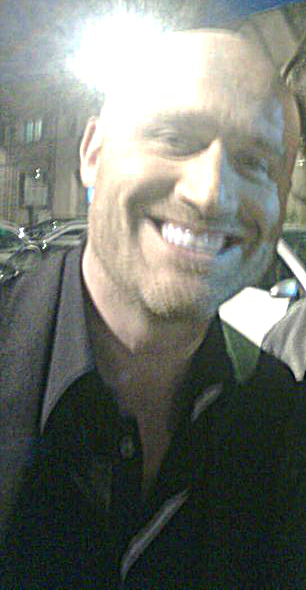
Rudy Zerbi

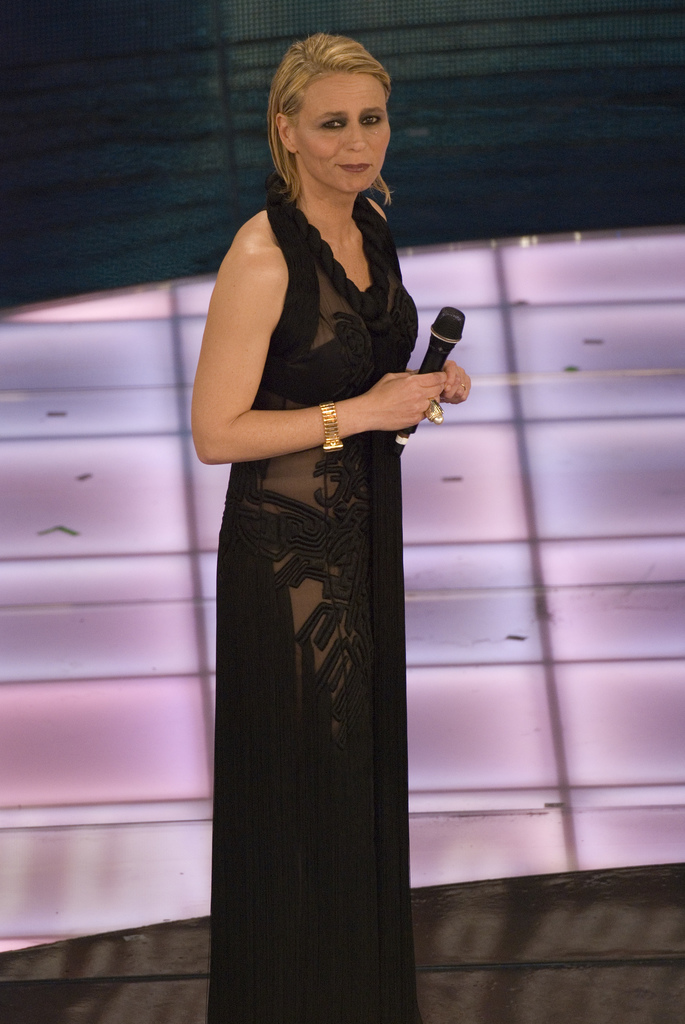
Maria De Filippi

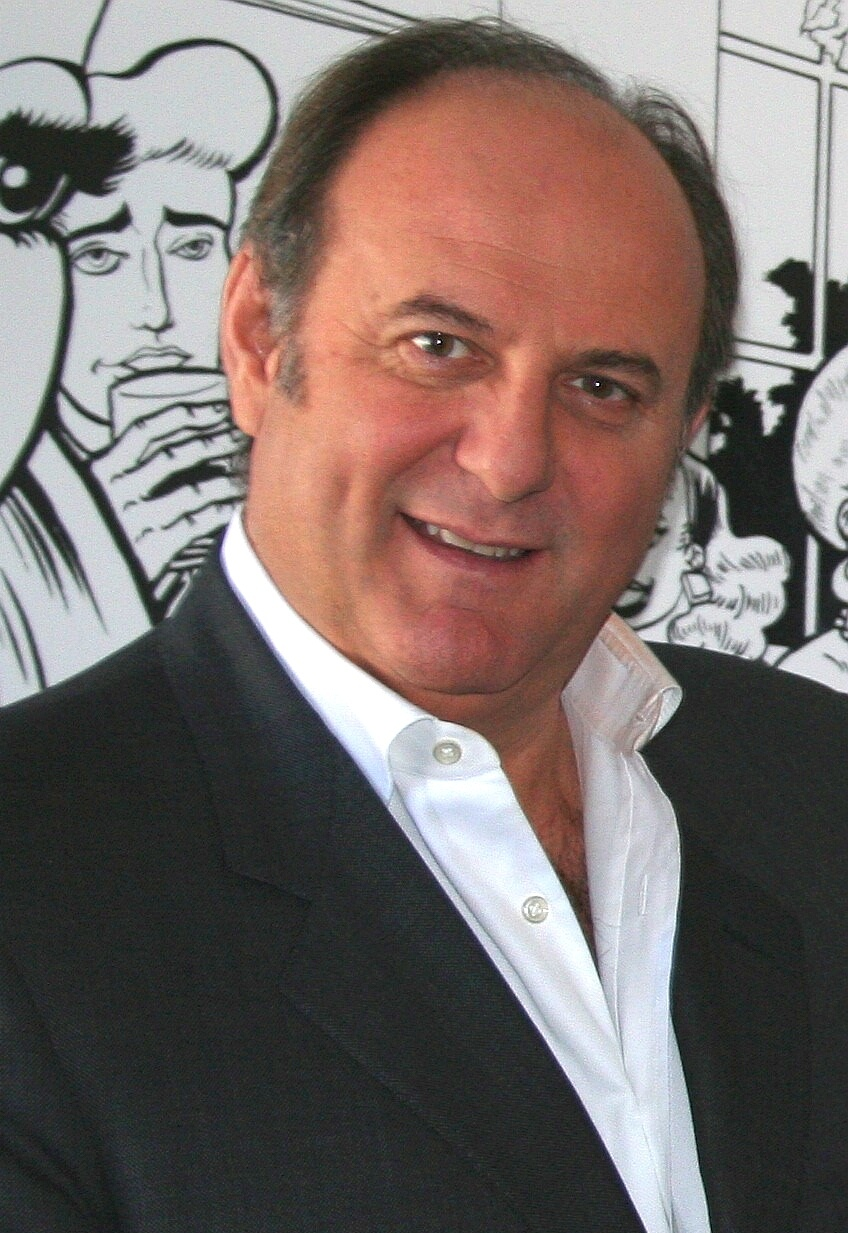
Gerry Scotti

The first season of the italian talent show Italia's Got Talent began with a pilot episode, produced by Fascino PGT in collaboration with FremantleMedia Italia. This show was recorded on 2 December 2009 at the Auditorium Massimo in Rome and aired on Saturday 12 December 2009 on Canale 5. This episode brought in an audience share of 26% and over 5 million viewers.

Given the great success received by the pilot episode, the show was then broadcast for another six episodes, every Monday from 12 April to 17 May 2010. The show was presented by Simone Annicchiarico and Geppi Cucciari. The judging panel for this season consisted of Rudy Zerbi, Maria De Filippi, and Gerry Scotti. This arrangement of judges would stay the same for the show until Season 5.

The first three audition episodes were recorded and broadcast from the Auditorium Massimo in Rome, while the semi-finals were broadcast from Theatre 5 in Cinecittà, also in Rome. The final saw opera singer Carmen Masola win the overall prize of €100,000. The singer-songwriters Federico Fattinger and Demis Facchinetti came respectively in second and third place.

== Semifinals ==
After the first round of auditions, 36 semi-finalists were selected and divided into 6 groups of 6 contestants. During the two semi-finals, for each group, televoting established a ranking of appreciation that allowed access to the final to only two contestants: the first place and the judges' choice between the second and third place.

=== Semi-final summary ===
Buzzed out | Judges' vote | Advanced - Public Vote
Advanced - Judges' Vote | Eliminated - Judges' Vote | Eliminated

==== Semi-final 1 (May 3, 2010) ====
Semi-Finalist	Order	Buzzes and Judges' Vote			Result
Semi-Finalist	Order	Scotti	Filippi	Zerbi	Result
Little Angel Villella	1				Eliminated
Christian Roberto	2				Eliminated (Lost Judges' Vote)
Federico Fattinger	3				Advanced (Won Judges' Vote)
Denis	4				Eliminated
Anonymous Calabrese	5				Eliminated
Notes of sand	6				Advanced (Won Public Vote)
Group 2
The Unlikely	1				Eliminated (Lost Judges' Vote)
Aldo Nicolini	2				Advanced (Won Judges' Vote)
Angel of Guard	3				Eliminated
Emanuela Suanno	4				Eliminated
Lorenzo Motta	5				Eliminated
Alfredo Marasco	6				Advanced (Won Public Vote)
Group 3
Andrea Brothers	1				Eliminated
Carmen Masola	2				Advanced (Won Public Vote)
Chico	3				Eliminated
Giovanna Minunni	4				Eliminated
Casadei-Colli	5				Eliminated (Lost Judges' Vote)
The Queens	6				Advanced (Won Judges' Vote)

==== Semi-final 2 (May 10, 2010) ====
Semi-Finalist	Order	Buzzes and Judges' Vote			Result
Semi-Finalist	Order	Scotti	Filippi	Zerbi	Result
Alfredo and Jessica Sbarra	1				Eliminated (Lost Judges' Vote)
Demis Facchinetti	2				Advanced (Won Judges' Vote)
Loil Awards	3				Eliminated
Flying Truzzi	4				Advanced (Won Public Vote)
Mario Rodo	5				Eliminated
Rutt and Panzer	6				Eliminated
Group 2
Easter Lucky	1				Eliminated (Lost Judges' Vote)
Daniel Lequaglia	2				Eliminated
Mr. Anthony	3				Eliminated
Maurizio Tassani	4				Eliminated
Christian Esposito	5				Advanced (Won Judges' Vote)
Miss Lolita	6				Advanced (Won Public Vote)
Group 3
Dangerous Game	1	/			Advanced (Won Judges' Vote)
Nathalie Zeolla	2				Eliminated
Michael Baldassarre	3				Eliminated
Once upon a time	4				Advanced (Won Public Vote)
Manzella Quartet	5				Eliminated
Angela Troina	6				Eliminated

==== Final (May 17, 2010) ====
Finalist	Order	Buzzes and Judges' Predictions			Result
Finalist	Order	Scotti	Filippi	Zerbi	Result
Flying Truzzi	1				Eliminated
Federico Fattinger	2				2nd Place
Aldo Nicolini	3				Eliminated
Notes of sand	4				Eliminated
Alfredo Marasco	5				Top 6
Miss Lolita	6				Top 6
Christian Esposito	7				Eliminated
The Queens	8				Top 6
Once upon a time	9				Eliminated
Carmen Masola	10				Winner
Dangerous Game	11				Eliminated
Demis Facchinetti	12				3rd Place

=== Ratings ===
Show	Date	Viewers	Share
Pilot	12 December	5,300,000	26.62%
Auditions 1	12 April	5,976,000	27.42%
Auditions 2	19 April	5,382,000	24.50%
Auditions 3	26 April	5,318,000	24.60%
Semi-final 1	3 May	5,365,000	26.63%
Semi-final 2	10 May	5,197,000	26.40%
Final	17 May	5,879,000	27.22%
	Average	5,489,000	26.20%
