= Italia's Got Talent season 2 =

Italia's Got Talent
- Season 2
- Presented by: Simone Annicchiarico; Geppi Cucciari
- Judges: Rudy Zerbi; Maria De Filippi; Gerry Scotti
- Winner: Fabrizio Vendramin
- Runner-up: Pilgrim Brothers

Release
- Original network: Canale 5
- Original release: 7 May – 11 June 2011

Season chronology
- ← Previous; Season 1 Next → Season 3

Judges for Italia's Got Talent Season 2

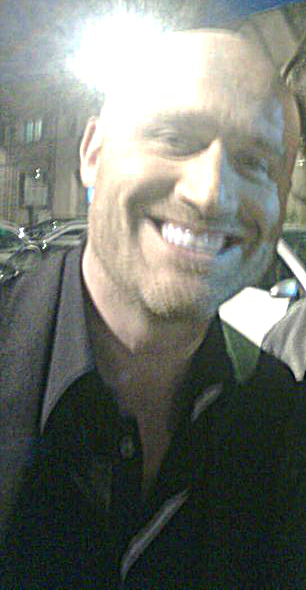
Rudy Zerbi

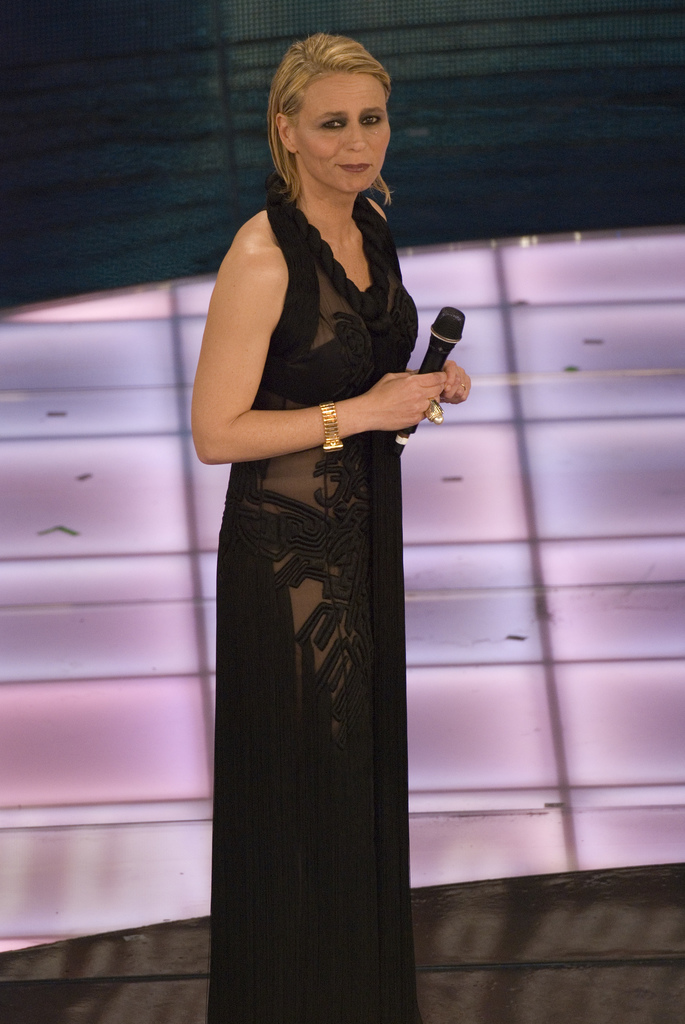
Maria De Filippi

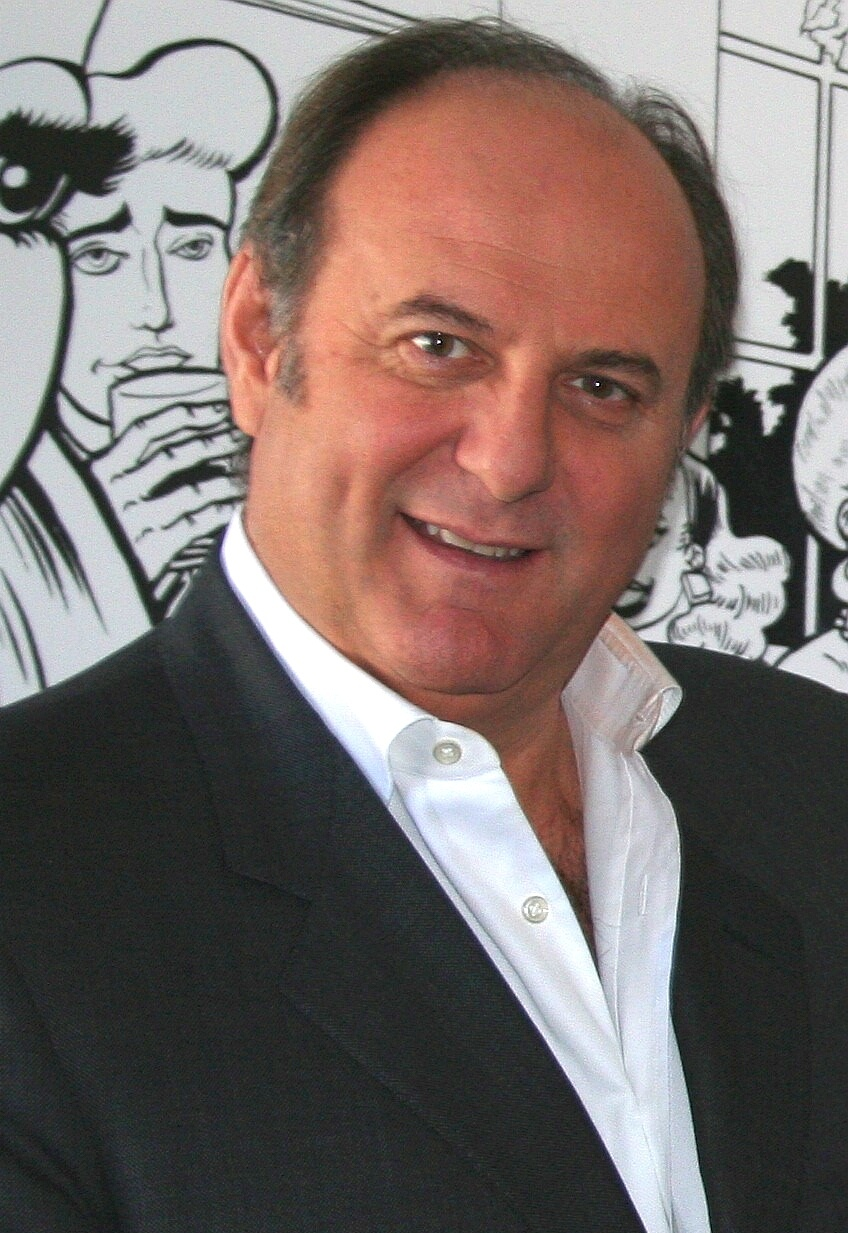
Gerry Scotti

The second season of the Italian talent show Italia's Got Talent aired on Canale 5 on Saturday evenings from 7 May to 11 June 2011. It saw the entire cast return from the previous season, from hosts Annicchiarico and Cucciari to judges De Filippi, Scotti and Zerbi.

The first four audition episodes were recorded once again at the Auditorium Massimo in Rome, while the last two (semi-final and final) were broadcast live from the Elios studios in Rome . The second season of the program saw painter Fabrizio Vendramin awarded the final prize of €100,000. The acrobats Fratelli Pellegrini and the magician Simone Calati came in second and third respectively.

After the first round of auditions, 24 semi-finalists were selected and divided into 3 groups of 8 contestants (unlike season 1, where the contestants were divided into 6 groups of 6 and there were 36 semi-finalists). During the semi-final, for each group, televoting allowed four contestants to advance to the final: the first three were chosen by the public and the judges' chose between the fourth and fifth place.

== Semifinals ==
=== Semi-final summary ===
Buzzed out | Judges' vote | Advanced - Public Vote
Advanced - Judges' Vote | Eliminated - Judges' Vote | Eliminated

==== Semi-final (June 4, 2011) ====
Semi-Finalist	Order	Buzzes and Judges' Vote			Result
Semi-Finalist	Order	Scotti	Filippi	Zerbi	Result
Swinging	1				Eliminated
Aldo Aldini	2				Eliminated (Lost Judges' Vote)
Mr. Andrea	3				Eliminated
Elena Disaro	4				Advanced (Won Public Vote)
Pilgrim Brothers	5				Advanced (Won Judges' Vote)
Raffa's Raffles	6				Eliminated
The Gibbon Family	7				Advanced (Won Public Vote)
Fabrizio Vendramin	8				Advanced (Won Public Vote)
Group 2
The Mnai's	1				Advanced (Won Public Vote)
ABC	2				Advanced (Won Public Vote)
Leopold Nepa	3				Eliminated
Prince of the Wind	4				Eliminated (Lost Judges' Vote)
Malarazza Little Orchestra	5				Advanced (Won Public Vote)
Victoria Bruno	6				Eliminated
Simone Calati	7				Advanced (Won Judges' Vote)
Pug and Nancy Triberti	8				Eliminated
Group 3
Emanuel D'Onofrio	1				Eliminated (Lost Judges' Vote)
Roberto Orrù and Selene Gamba	2				Eliminated
Simone Newfoundland	3				Eliminated
Dante Cigarini	4				Eliminated
Nicholas Brown	5				Advanced (Won Public Vote)
Anna Maria Bianchi	6				Advanced (Won Judges' Vote)
Angels Prut	7				Advanced (Won Public Vote)
Daniele Pacini (LaLa McCallan)	8				Advanced (Won Public Vote)

==== Final (June 11, 2011) ====
Finalist	Order	Buzzes			Result
Finalist	Order	Scotti	Filippi	Zerbi	Result
The Mnai's	1				9th Place
ABC	2				6th Place
Fabrizio Vendramin	3				Winner
Elena Disaro	4				5th Place
Simone Calati	5				3rd Place
Anna Maria Bianchi	6				11th Place
Nicholas Brown	7				8th Place
Malarazza Little Orchestra	8				7th Place
The Gibbon Family	9				10th Place
Angels Prut	10				4th Place
Daniele Pacini (LaLa McCallan)	11				12th Place
Pilgrim Brothers	12				2nd Place

=== Ratings ===
Show	Date	Viewers	Share
Auditions 1	7 May	3,974,000	19.89%
Auditions 2	14 May	4,752,000	23.48%
Auditions 3	21 May	5,457,000	27.87%
Auditions 4	28 May	5,385,000	27.21%
Semi-final	4 June	5,933,000	33.69%
Final	11 June	6,402,000	33.14%
	Average	5,317,000	27.55%
