= Cosimo Maria Palopoli =

Italian musician

- Born: February 6, 1994 (age 31); Piatra Neamt
- Occupation: CEO of IUV

Cosimo Maria Palopoli (born February 6, 1994, in Piatra Neamt) is an Italian musician, inventor and co-founder and CEO of IUV, a chemical company operating in the bioplastics sector. In 2021, he was listed in Forbes 30 under 30 Manufacturing & Industry. In 2023 he was ranked 40 Under 40 by Fortune Italy for Top Manager category.

== Early life and education ==
Cosimo Maria Palopoli was born on February 6, 1994, in Piatra Neamt, Romania. He obtained a Bachelor's degree at the University of Florence in Food Technology and a Master's degree in Food Science and Technology from the Catholic University of the Sacred Heart.

== Career ==
Palopoli co-founded IUV in 2019, together with Maria Lucia Gaetani. Later the same year he represents Italy for innovation in Tokyo, with the Italian Embassy and the Ministry of Foreign Affairs, for Italian Innovation Day.

In 2021, he is listed by Forbes in the Top 100 Forbes Under 30 Italy 2021 and Top 30 Forbes Under 30 Europe 2021 list in the Manufacturing & Industry category.

In 2023, Palopoli was named as an official Keynote speaker and testimonial of excellence, among the most influential European leaders in the field of sustainability for the EIIS - European Institute of Innovation for Sustainability, in Rome.

=== Music ===
He has participated in music events, including Italia's Got Talent, and has arranged music for Dora Donarelli, an Italian theater director. His first album Equilibrium was released in Pistoia in 2017.
