= Enrico Papi =

Italian television presenter (born 1965)

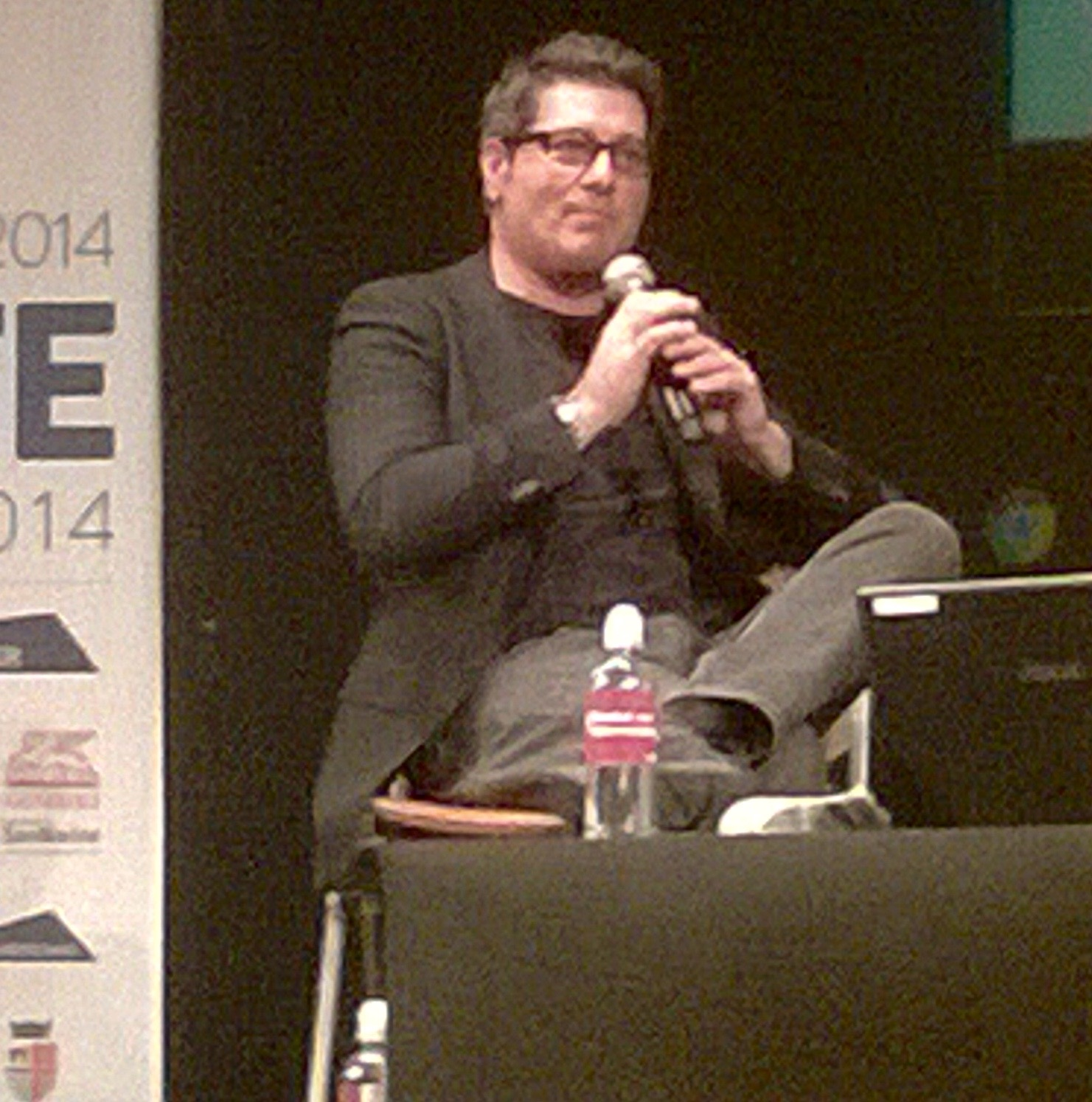
- Papi in Rimini during the 2014 Network Festival
- Born: 3 June 1965 (age 61); Rome
- Occupation: Television presenter
- Height: 1.76 m (5 ft 9 in)

Enrico Papi (born 3 June 1965) is an Italian television presenter.

== TV ==
=== Rai ===
- Fantastico bis (Rai 1, 1988–1990)
- Unomattina (Rai 1, 1990–1994)
- La Banda dello Zecchino (Rai 1, 1992)
- Unomattina Estate (Rai 1, 1992–1993)
- Fatti e misfatti (Rai 1, 1993)
- Chiacchiere (Rai 1, 1995)
- Chiacchiere di Enrico Papi (Rai 1, 1995–1996)
- 51º Festival della Canzone Italiana di Sanremo (Rai 1, 2001)
- Dopo il Festival tutti da me (Rai 1, 2001)

=== Mediaset ===
- Papi quotidiani (Canale 5, 1996)
- Tutti in piazza (Canale 5, 1996)
- Verissimo (Canale 5, 1996–1997)
- Edizione straordinaria (Italia 1, 1997)
- Sarabanda (Italia 1, 1997–2004, 2017)
- Buona Domenica (Canale 5, 1997–1998)
- Regalo di Natale (Italia 1, 1997)
- Sapore d'estate (Canale 5, 1998)
- Predizioni (Italia 1, 1999)
- Beato tra le donne (Canale 5, 1999)
- Matricole (Italia 1, 2001)
- Il traditore (Italia 1, 2001)
- Anello debole (The Weakest Link) (Italia 1, 2001)
- Miss Universo Italia 2003 (Canale 5, 2002)
- Matricole & Meteore (Italia 1, 2002)
- Papirazzo (Italia 1, 2003–2004)
- ModaMare a Porto Cervo (Canale 5, 2003)
- 3, 2, 1 Baila (Italia 1, 2004)
- L'imbroglione (Canale 5, 2004)
- Il gioco dei 9 (Italia 1, 2004)
- Super Sarabanda (Italia 1, 2005)
- La pupa e il secchione (Italia 1, 2006)
- Distraction (Italia 1, 2007)
- Prendere o lasciare (Italia 1, 2007)
- La ruota della fortuna (Italia 1, 2007–2009)
- Batti le bionde (Italia 1, 2008)
- Jackpot – Fate il vostro gioco (Canale 5, 2008)
- Il colore dei soldi (Italia 1, 2009)
- La ruota della fortuna – Celebrity Edition (Italia 1, 2009–2010)
- CentoxCento (Italia 1, 2010)
- La pupa e il secchione – Il ritorno (Italia 1, 2010)
- Viva Las Vegas – Fate il vostro gioco (Italia 1, 2010)
- Trasformat (Italia 1, 2010–2011)
- Top One (Italia 1, 2013–2014)
- Scherzi a parte (Canale 5, 2021–2022)
- Big Show – Enrico Papi (Canale 5, 2022)

=== Sky ===
- Guess My Age - Indovina l'età (TV8, 2017–2021)
- La notte dei record (TV8, 2018)
- Italia's Got Talent (TV8 and Sky Uno, 2020–2021)
- Name That Tune - Indovina la canzone (TV8, 2020–2021)

== Filmography ==
=== Dubbing ===
- Mulan, Mushu (1998)

=== Actor ===
- The Bold and the Beautiful, serie TV (episodio No. 3214, 2000)
- Ravanello pallido (2001)
- Ambo (2015)

=== Videoclip musicali ===
- Tutto molto interessante (2016)
- Mooseca (2017)
