= Witches to the North =

- Directed by: Giovanni Veronesi
- Written by: Giovanni Veronesi; Sandro Veronesi; Massimiliano Governi
- Produced by: Vittorio Cecchi Gori
- Starring: Teo Mammucari; Paul Sorvino; Emmanuelle Seigner; Daniele Liotti
- Cinematography: Giovanni Canevari
- Edited by: Alessio Doglione
- Music by: Mysto
- Release date: 16 November 2001
- Running time: 93 minutes
- Country: Italy
- Language: Italian

Witches to the North (Italian: Streghe verso nord) is a 2001 Italian comedy film directed by Giovanni Veronesi.

== Plot ==
Teo Sellari is a writer who has authored a book about witches, which is being adapted into a film. Gallio De Dominicis, the film's producer, reveals that witches are real and that both he and Teo belong to a special group called Disinnescatori (literally "Deactivators"), although Teo was unaware of this. Their task is to "neutralize" witches by headbutting them and then dragging them seven steps north, which causes everyone who witnessed the scene to immediately forget it—just as Teo had written in his book. Initially frightened and skeptical, Teo eventually accepts his destiny and agrees to help his colleague. In the end, Lucilla, Teo’s sister-in-law and the wife of his brother Paolo, is revealed to be a powerful witch, and Teo is forced to strike her. He seems to want to retire from this strange profession, but the final, highly suggestive scene shows him helping Gallio win a remote-controlled sailboat race by swimming underwater for several minutes, using one of the powers granted by being a Disinnescatore.

== Production ==
The film is set in Rome. The co-protagonist, Sorvino, is passionate about dynamic ship modeling (remote-controlled model ships). The two protagonists travel in a BMW 5 Series (E39). The seaside villa belonging to the protagonist's brother is located in Castiglione della Pescaia - Punta Ala, while the Italian championship for model ship racing takes place in Rosignano Marittimo - Solvay, both in Tuscany.

== Cast ==
- Teo Mammucari as Teo Sellari
- Paul Sorvino as Gallio De Dominicis
- Emmanuelle Seigner as Lucilla
- Daniele Liotti as Paolo Sellari
- Anna Valle as Carlotta
- Dario Bandiera as Saro
- Bianca Guaccero as Selvaggia
- Valeria Cavalli as the secretary
- Vittorio Amandola as Baffone
- Gérard Depardieu as himself
- Federica Fontana as herself
