= Sarabanda =

Italian TV game show

- Genre: Variety show, game show
- Directed by: Cesare Gigli (1997); Giuliana Baroncelli (1997-2003); Maurizio Spagliardi (2003-2004); Lorenzo Lorenzini (2005); Giovanni Caccamo (2009); Sergio Colabona (2017); Roberto Cenci (2025), Claudio Asquini (since 2025)
- Presented by: Enrico Papi (1997-2005, 2017, 2025); Teo Mammucari with Belén Rodríguez (2009)
- Country of origin: Italy
- Original language: Italian
- No. of seasons: 12
- No. of episodes: 1776 + 27 in prime time

Production
- Executive producers: Corrado Grego (1997-2001); Lino Tatalo (2001-2005, 2009, 2017)
- Production locations: Settecamini (1997-2003, 2009, 2017); Rome (2003-2005)
- Running time: 20/40/45/55/60/70 minutes approx including commercials
- Production companies: RTI-Mediaset (1997-2005); Endemol Italia (2009); RTI with EndemolShine Italy (2017); Banijay Italia (since 2025)

Original release
- Network: Italia 1 (1997-2005, 2017, 2025); Canale 5 (2009, 2025); Italia 1 HD (2017); Radio 105 (2017)
- Release: September 8, 1997 – June 27, 2017

Sarabanda is an Italian television show initially proposed as a variety and later as a musical game with prizes, adaption of the TV format Name That Tune, presented by Enrico Papi and broadcast on Italia 1 in the time slot of the access prime time from 8 September 1997 to 20 February 2004. After the first closing was resumed from 14 March to 10 April 2005 with the broadcasting of Super Sarabanda, a tournament among the most representative champions of the game. The program was re-proposed from 8 June to 30 August 2009 on Canale 5 in the pre-ward, presented by Teo Mammucari with Belén Rodríguez. The program was back on the air for a third time with three special episodes in prime time on Italia 1 from 13 to 27 June 2017 with the return to the running of Enrico Papi.

It aired from Monday to Saturday (from April 2000 to June 2001, and also on Sunday, from January 2004 only until Friday). It had a starting time between 7:40 pm and 8:00 pm even if the most common was between 7:56 pm and 7:58 pm, and an end between 8:40 pm and 9:00 pm (variable duration depending on the editions). In 2005 it was scheduled from Monday to Friday from 8:45 pm to 9:05 pm, and in 2009 from Monday to Friday from 6:50 pm to 8:00 pm. The three episodes in prime time 2017 were aired every Tuesday from 9:15 pm to midnight.

The program was produced by RTI-Mediaset, realized by Videotime S.p.A. licensed by Sandy Frank Entertainment and distributed by Einstein Multimedia from 1997 to 2004. In 2005 the Duck On Line s.r.l. has joined the Videotime in the realization. In 2009 production went to Endemol Italia, while in 2017 the production sees a co-participation of RTI and EndemolShine Italy with the format distributed by Sky Vision.

Until the sixth edition, the episodes were recorded in Studio 1 of the Centro Titanus Elios, Settecamini (Rome), while from the seventh they moved to the Teatro 3 of Cinecittà in Rome, then moved to the Teatro 9 in 2005. In 2009 the program is back to be registered at the Elios Studios. In 2017 the program was broadcast live from the historic Studio 1 of the Centro Titanus Elios.

With 1747 episodes (including 51 special) as well as 20 specials in prime time, it turns out to be the most enduring music-themed quiz on Italian television and one of the longest-running Italian television prizes in general. Considering also the first version, the program has 1757 total episodes.

On 20 May 2025, the Sarabanda Celebrity edition debuted on Italia 1 HD.

Sarabanda returned on 21 July 2025 on Canale 5 again with Enrico Papi as host.

== Editions ==
Variety version

First aired	Last aired	Episodes	TV host	Directed by
September 8, 1997	October 11, 1997	30	Enrico Papi	Cesare Gigli

Game show version

Edition	Subtitle	First aired	Last aired	Episodes	Specials early evening	TV host	Directed by
1	Il gioco della musica	October 13, 1997	June 27, 1998	216	2	Enrico Papi	Giuliana Baroncelli
Summer 1998	Il gioco della musica	June 29, 1998	September 12, 1998	48	–	Enrico Papi	Giuliana Baroncelli
2	Il gioco della musica	September 14, 1998	June 26, 1999	244	–	Enrico Papi	Giuliana Baroncelli
3	Il gioco della musica	September 6, 1999	July 9, 2000	279	–	Enrico Papi	Giuliana Baroncelli
4	Il gioco della musica	August 28, 2000	June 16, 2001	293	3	Enrico Papi	Giuliana Baroncelli
5	Il gioco della musica	September 10, 2001	June 1, 2002	207	5	Enrico Papi	Giuliana Baroncelli
6		September 15, 2002	June 28, 2003	245	3	Enrico Papi	Giuliana Baroncelli
7		September 15, 2003	January 30, 2004	112	4	Enrico Papi	Maurizio Spagliardi
Scala & vinci		February 2, 2004	February 20, 2004	15	–	Enrico Papi	Maurizio Spagliardi
Super Sarabanda	Il torneo dei campioni	March 14, 2005	April 10, 2005	20	–	Enrico Papi	Lorenzo Lorenzini
Summer 2009		June 8, 2009	August 30, 2009	48	–	Teo Mammucari with Belén Rodríguez	Giovanni Caccamo
Special 2017		June 13, 2017	June 27, 2017	–	3	Enrico Papi	Sergio Colabona
Sarabanda Celebrity		May 25, 2025	July 20, 2025	20		Enrico Papi	Roberto Cenci
Sarabanda		July 21, 2025				Enrico Papi	Roberto Cenci, Claudio Asquini

== Format ==
=== First version ===
The first version of the program was a variety with a musical background that aired live, with phone calls to dedication and other song numbers, where Papi was assisted by Formula 3 and by imitator Gigi Vigliani, who performed in some comic sketches. The program also took part in a musical ensemble called Saraband, and an audience of about a hundred people, called "choir", who were the outline of the set design.

This formula soon proved to be a fiasco, recording low television ratings, so the authors, after just one month of transmission, decided to implement a drastic change in the format, while maintaining the same title, which referred to the variety of shows offered in a chaotic way and noisy from the cast of the broadcast in its first version.

=== Second version ===
The program was thus transformed into a quiz with a musical theme, inspired by the historical Italian program by Mario Riva, Il Musichiere (broadcast from 1957 to 1960 on Programma Nazionale); as the famous program, also Sarabanda was based on the NBC format Name That Tune, created by Harry Salter in 1952 and present in many countries of the world, where competitors challenged themselves by answering questions of musical culture and, above all, guessing the titles of the reasons heard in the various games, in order to win the title of champion and, at the same time, win the final prize money. The quiz was divided into several elimination games, in number proportional to the number of participants (initially three, then four or even five in the last editions). Some of the games were modified or replaced by others during the seasons, while the final game remained unchanged. The melodies that were made to listen to the competitors were the arranged MIDI versions of the original songs (although in the first three episodes the bases were prepared by Saraband), while in the most recent edition were proposed in the MP3 version. Following this change of format, the Formula 3 and Gigi Vigliani were excluded from the cast of the transmission while both the chorus and the Saraband remained.

With this new formula the program found the popularity and success, so as to put in serious difficulty the programs of other networks broadcast at the same time, including the 8:00 pm edition of the TG1 and TG5 news programs.

== Games ==
Canzone in maschera (Song in the mask): it was the first ever game of Sarabanda. The competitor had to guess a song of his favorite singer, widely revisited by Saraband in such a way as to make it difficult to guess. Three songs were performed (one for each competitor). If the competitor guessed, he earned a point, otherwise it remained at zero. Any earned points were retained for the next game. It was present only in the first episode of the first edition.

Fuori uno (Out of one): it was introduced a couple of weeks after the start of the program. In this game the elimination of one of the competitors was immediately foreseen, replaced by the current champion. It was composed of individual questions of musical culture (the competitors had only three seconds to answer), where those who first committed three errors were rejected (the non-answer to a question was considered an error). It was present only in the first edition and for the first part of the summer one, until 1 August 1998.

Spaccasecondo: replaced Fuori uno from August 24, 1998; the competitors, one at a time, had to guess two melodies in the shortest possible time on a limit of five seconds each. The game was therefore structured in two series of melodies to listen and try to guess; after the first series (called "first round of music" by Papi) was shown the provisional ranking and proceeded to the second series starting from the first in the standings to the last. The competitor, once booked, had five seconds to say the title; in the event of an expired response time or an error, five seconds of penalty were given. The "slower" competitor was eliminated, that is, the one that took the most time to guess his two reasons, replaced by the champion who took his position. From January 2002, he also saw the current champion busy (thus losing the preliminary game feature) which always took place in the post furthest from the presenter. This game, to avoid frequent parity situations, presented an approximation of 0.05 seconds until the fourth edition, 0.02 seconds in the fifth edition and 0.1 seconds in the sixth edition. On 13 March 2003 it was canceled due to the shortening of the duration of the program. It is resumed in the special edition of 2017, returning to an approximation of 0.02 seconds.

Countdown: introduced in the 2003-2004 edition in progress and present from October until the end of the edition. The participants, including the champion, were involved together and had to guess three songs in 1 minute and 30 seconds, without time stopped (only the conductor could stop him), to pass the turn. The competitor, once booked, had five seconds to give the answer. The game ended when three out of four competitors guessed three tunes each, eliminating what had not yet arrived. In case the time was up, if two or more competitors did not guess the three tunes necessary to pass the turn, went to the play-off whatever their score had been.

Extracanto: used in the 2009 edition, it provided for the broadcasting of a video where a foreign tourist visiting a city in Italy sang a song he was listening to on headphones; at the end of the registration the first competitor who booked could try to guess the title of the song, qualifying for the next round if he had guessed. In case he had not guessed, he could no longer give the title by allowing others to book. The last competitor still in the race was eliminated and replaced by the current champion. It was present from the beginning until July 24.

Non c'è due senza Teo (There is no two without Teo): the competitor had to answer a multiple choice question. The correct answer was worth three points, if he was not sure of the given answer he could choose a second one, thus having a point in case one of them was correct; the wrong answer made a point lose. After a certain number of questions the competitor with the lowest score was eliminated and replaced by the current champion. He replaced the Extracanto from 24 July 2009 until the end of the season.

Pentagramma (Music pentagram): through a series of questions, riddles and songs performed by Saraband, associated with the notes to choose, which in turn corresponded to a letter, were composed the words of a phrase taken from a famous song, which you could try to guess only after having answered the single question addressed to all competitors, by reservation. The competitor who answered the question correctly, after discovering the letter (on the model of the famous game Wheel of Fortune), then, had five seconds to give the verse of the Pentagram or could continue to choose the remaining notes. In the event of an expired response time (five seconds) or incorrect response, the competitor could no longer answer the question by allowing others to make a reservation. If no one gave the correct answer or the time ran out, a letter was found, but the point was not assigned to anyone, as no one could give the answer and the next note was chosen by the competitor who had chosen the previous one. The first note of the game was always chosen by the champion. The solution of the sentence was worth five points and sanctioned the end of the game. In the fifth edition were made small changes to the game: who was wrong to answer the question, gave a point to opponents and the solution of the verse was worth three points and no more than five. In the first edition, with a three-way formula, this game was immediately accessible to the final: the winner of the Pentagramma had to wait from behind the scenes who among the two remaining competitors won the next game, that is the Asta musicale. From August 1998 only the competitor with the lowest score was eliminated. This game, present from the first edition, was canceled during the fifth edition and replaced by the game of Gong. It is shown in the special edition of 2017.

Gong: introduced during the fifth edition, from November 2001 to January 2002, replacing the Pentagramma, it consisted of finding, among the boxes of the game graphics, those that depicted a gong; when a competitor found one, he had to guess within a certain time limit a number of motifs that were variable and if they were all guessed, a sum of money was also won which varied according to the number of reasons to be guessed; if you chose a box that did not represent a gong you had to answer a question of musical culture, all the competitors could book (as happened in the game of the Pentagramma) and who answered correctly got a point. The game ended when all the gongs, whose number were variable to bet in episode, were found; the competitor who had the lowest score was eliminated.

KaraTeo: introduced in 2009 alone, the contestants, one at a time, had to guess the word of a song's text from its initial letter. In case of an exact answer, you earned a point, in case of an incorrect answer, anyone among the other competitors could make a reservation to answer. Fragments of text of three different songs were proposed, for a total of twelve words to be guessed (four to song). The competitor with the lowest score was eliminated. It was present from the beginning until June 29.

10×10: the competitor had to guess ten tunes as quickly as possible on a ten-second limit because, in case of an error or an expired response time, ten seconds of penalty were given. The competitor who had accumulated more seconds was eliminated. It replaced the KaraTeo from 29 June 2009 until the end of the edition.

Asta musicale (Musical auction): through a ridged rhyme riddle (except at the beginning of the first edition, where it was a simple clue, and at the beginning of the seventh edition, where the riddle was placed in the form of an enigma), in which no word of the title could appear of the song to guess, you could deduce the hidden title of a song by listening to a number of notes starting from ten and playing alternately the number of notes down, until the competitors (initially one in the first edition, two in the following, three in the last) they did not pass the hand, saying "step" or "I leave", or at the achievement of a single note. After listening to the notes (or the note) the competitor had five seconds to give the title. At that point, guessing was gained a point, but mistaken or allowing the response time to expire it was delivered to opponents. The possibility of passing the hand, if you did not know the answer, was precluded only to the competitor who was first read the clue, which was then to try to guess. Who had already identified the title was enough to say "The soothsayer with a (note)" and so hazard the answer immediately with the help of a single note played by Papi with the piano (in the 2009 edition was the teacher Idà to play the notes ). Special cases were the first episodes of the first edition, in which the clue was shown only after one of the two competitors had won the auction.

After a fixed number of riddles (variable from four to eight depending on the editions) the competitors with the best score qualified for the next round (in the version with four) or went in the final (in the three-way version). In the first edition and for a part of the summer one (in the version with two), those who reached first three points went to the final. During the seventh edition, between November and December 2003, for a short period, following the suppression of the Sessanta secondi, in the version with four, two competitors were eliminated, those with the lowest score, qualifying the final two.

The Asta was present in all editions, with the exceptions of the Scala & vinci and Super Sarabanda versions.

Sessanta secondi (Sixty seconds): appearing for the first time with the beginning of the 2001-2002 edition and initially called Fuori i secondi, it involved the three competitors one at a time and consisted of guessing the greatest number of tunes in a minute, reserving to give the title it stopped even the time, which flowed backwards. After booking, they had the usual five seconds to say the title; the competitor could also say "pass", but the reason could not be recovered. After five seconds of listening, if the competitor was not booked, the motive was stopped and the title could not be given. Whoever guessed less was eliminated, the remaining two took part in the final game. The champion always played last, knowing already the threshold for the passage of the turn. At the end of the 2001-2002 edition, on May 22, the game was canceled due to the reduction of the duration of the broadcast, and then returned during the 2002-2003 edition, from October 21, due to the lengthening of the program. In the 2003-2004 edition, it was only present between October and November, taking the place of the Stop 'n' Go and then definitively canceled after about a month. It was reproposed in the special edition of 2017 only in the last episode.

Stop 'n' Go: it replaced Sessanta seconi from the start of the 2003-2004 edition, remaining among the games for just under a month (between September and October). The regulation of the game was completely the same as that of its predecessor with the only difference that time ran without stopping (only the conductor could stop it) even when the competitor was booked to say the title of the song; the traditional Sessanta secondi formula was then restored.

Triello: he made his debut in the 2003-2004 edition, remaining present from December until the end of the edition. The rules of the game were quite the same as that of the Sessanta secondi with two differences: simultaneously involved all three competitors remained instead of one at a time and those who missed or delayed the response time after having booked, gave the point to the opponents.

7×30: as the name suggests, the final game, never modified, consisted of guessing seven motifs in half a minute and thus winning the prize money, or guessing in greater number of the adversary to take the title of champion and return the following episode. The contestants played each one with their own grid of motifs, which were alternately heard; even if, from the sixth edition, towards the end of the game, in crucial situations, the closest competitor was kept to the prize pool, thus making the other competitor listen to more reasons in a row. The reasons were mainly composed of six Italian songs and a foreign one, with a different level of difficulty, evaluated with the popularity of the single songs, often of increasing difficulty depending on the order, however leaving a position between the most difficult reasons. fifth and seventh position. The most easily guessable songs used to cyclically occur in the game during the episodes, whereas the most difficult ones were almost always one-off. Once the button was pressed, the contestants stopped the stopwatch, which ran backwards, after which they had five seconds to try the answer: alternatively they could say "step" and freeze the motif, trying to guess it after listening to the missing grid motifs, compatibly with the seconds available. In the event of a wrong answer or an expired response time, the prize money could no longer be won, but only to aim for the title. If the two competitors had guessed both their seven reasons, the prize went to those who remained with more seconds (this fact never occurred).

The grid was graphically represented by seven vertical boxes per competitor and was listened starting from the bottom (first motif) to the top (seventh motif); in the first three episodes of the first edition the grid was heard from top to bottom while in the first episode it was not even present in graphics. This game turns out to be the most used by the program since it was only missing in the Scala & vinci version.

Spareggio (Play-off): in all the situations of equality between two or more competitors, one or more non-consecutive reasons to be guessed were proposed (depending on the number of competitors involved); pressing the button, the competitor was saved giving the correct answer or eliminated in case of an expired response time or wrong answer. Competitors who did not have to support the play-off usually fell behind the post. In the rare cases in which no competitor booked to give the answer, after about 10–15 seconds of listening, the presenter interrupted the motif and another was proposed.

Spareggione: in the editions conducted by Papi, from the fifth onwards, for the sixty seconds and the 7 × 30, the Spareggio was played to the best of five tracks to be guessed (thus winning, who first guessed three reasons). In case of an incorrect answer or an expired time, the point was assigned to the opponent. In the Sessanta secondi, in case the two challengers of the champion had achieved the same score, the Spareggione between them was disputed before the champion himself started the game.

=== Games in the Scala e vinci version ===
The competitors competing in each episode in this version were seven, each equipped with a small monitor on the station. The jackpot took shape during the episode based on the progress of the following games:

Il gioco delle notine (The game of notines) The competitors, one by one, had to choose a Notina (which through gestures could give indications or mislead), which extracted from a pocket of the miniskirt a CD on which was depicted a figure which was associated with a question of a musical nature; a song fragment, who was the first to be booked and answered correctly, passed the turn and helped to increase the prize money of the number corresponding to the one shown on the CD. In the event of a wrong answer, the competitor could no longer answer the question, allowing others to make a reservation. Among the seven CDs to choose from there was a special, called "jolly" on which there was the logo of the program instead of the figure: whoever found it automatically passed the turn and increased the jackpot of 3,000 euros. The last competitor still in the race was eliminated.

Titolo nascosto (Hidden title) It was necessary to guess the title of a song of which only the number of words was known. After discovering a word, Papi offered a sum to his liking to accumulate at the prize money in case of identification of the title. The more words were discovered, the more the figure diminished. Those who booked and gave the exact title, passed the turn and raised the prize money of the amount offered by Papi, in case of wrong answer, the competitor could no longer try to guess, allowing others to book. The last competitor still in the race was eliminated.

Nota stonata (Note out of tune) A series of individual questions of musical culture were asked by the host, to which the five remaining competitors had to answer "yes" or "no", where the two mistakes were eliminated. When there were three competitors (two from February 6, 2004) the Notines were taking place, each affirming something true regarding the music world, only two (then only one) claimed something false. Who among the competitors still in the race identified the false statement (and therefore the Notata stonata) was qualified to the final game, who was booked when the statement was true was eliminated. It was possible that the Notines took over even if the number of competitors had not been reached, in fact after a certain amount of time and after a certain number of questions a siren was triggered that ended the series of questions.

Scala musicale (Musical scale) It consisted of guessing the title of the fragments of eight songs (the first seven represented graphically by the musical notes, while the eighth from the jackpot). The competitor, in case he won the prize, could choose to double it by listening to a ninth song. In case he had not guessed it would have lost the entire sum won (the doubling was never attempted by any competitor). There were also two aid to complete the climb, usable in case of error or uncertainty by the competitor but only usable after having guessed the remaining songs (in the version with two competitors the first who could benefit from the aid was the one with less seconds) . Initially they were the option (they were affected five seconds of the song in question and then were given five titles of songs or the same author or very similar, of which only one was correct) and the change (they were made to listen to seven seconds of another song instead of the changed one). The latter was then replaced by a second option from February 6, 2004. The time available was 50 seconds, which flowed backwards and could be stopped by booking. It was not allowed to say "step" and listen to the songs more than once. In the beginning this game involved two competitors, who made the first mistake or did not know the answer and had exhausted the aid or did not exploit properly a help was eliminated and could not continue climbing leaving the title of champion to the opponent, while in the case both had guessed the eight songs the prize money and the title of champion went to those who had more seconds and only he could try to double it. The finalists were then reduced to one from 6 February, which automatically became the champion. In the version to a competitor, the aid was immediately usable, without having to wait to guess all the remaining song fragments.

=== Games in the Super Sarabanda - Il torneo dei campioni version ===
Super Sarabanda - Il torneo dei campioni (Super Sarabanda - The Champions Tournament) was a tournament in which the contestants were among the strongest champions in the program's history. This tournament was divided into two phases: the first, which lasted 12 episodes, saw four champions compete against each other, of which only two could take points; at the end of this first phase, the seven champions who had scored the most points and a fished out among the excluded, moved on to the second phase. The second phase lasted 8 episodes and saw the remaining champions compete in direct matches, starting from the quarter-finals and then moving on to the semi-finals until the two finals between the two remaining champions. To win the tournament you had to win both finals, otherwise in the case of a final won a head playoff was necessary. The prize money for the winner was €250,000. The games were only two:

Terzetti: involved four champions together and consisted of guessing three sequential motifs, those guessing earned one point, the wrong guy gave the opportunity to others to book and respond. Those who reached two points qualified for 7 × 30.

7 × 30

In the two finals the 10 × 50, a similar version of the 7 × 30, was used instead.

Spareggione: was played to the best of the three reasons (therefore the winner was the one who first guessed two).

=== Games in the Special 2017 ===
The tournament was structured on three episodes, broadcast on Tuesday every week. The first two episodes saw four historical champions of the program compete against four new competitors (a total of eight historic champions and eight new competitors were involved). The winners of the first two episodes qualified directly for the final phase, while the third and final finalist was the winner of the third episode, contested among ten of the fourteen eliminated from the previous two episodes. The final phase was played at the end of the third episode.

Among the games there were the returns of the Spaccasecondo, the Pentagramma (with the rules used until the fourth edition) and the Sessanta secondi (used only in the final episode to decree the two finalists) while they were confirmed both the Asta musicale that the 7 × 30. In some cases the classic Spareggio with a dry pattern was also used. Change of name instead for the Spareggione, become Spaccaduello (used only in the final episode to select five of the ten best competitors of the previous two episodes). Three new games:

La materia (Matter): A reason was made to listen to the five competitors, the first to book and give the correct answer could choose one of the eight subjects available. If the competitor did not guess the reason, another competitor could be booked until the correct answer was given. The chosen subject consisted of three questions to which the competitor had to answer in thirty seconds. In the case of a wrong answer even to only one of the questions or time expired, the competitor was eliminated. The first two competitors to make mistakes (or alternatively the last remaining in the race) were eliminated. Competitors who answered the three questions correctly qualified for the next game.

La scommessa (The bet): The three remaining competitors had to bet on the driver's proposals how many reasons (from a minimum of one to a maximum of five) would have been able to guess. The motives lasted four seconds, after which the competitor had to give the title; in case of a wrong answer or no reply, the next reason was passed. The two competitors who, by booking, had bet to guess the highest number of reasons and who in turn would have won their bet, or they would have guessed as many reasons as they had expected to guess, qualify to 7x30.

Duello (Duel): He saw the two competitors who risked the elimination competing, involving them together and consisted in the guessing of the trio of songs (three motifs placed in sequence). The Duel was played at the best of five trio to guess, so he won, who first guessed three trio. In case of error or time expired the point was assigned to the opponent. This game was proposed after the Spaccasecondo, the Pentagramma and the Asta Musicale.

== History of the program ==
=== Genesis ===
In May 1997, when Giorgio Gori, after abandoning the role of director of Canale 5 and taking over the reins of Italia 1, decided to renew the program schedules for the 1997-1998 television season with the aim of strengthening the youth target to which he addressed and at the same time give her a new identity, proposing new formats to be entrusted to familiar faces of the Mediaset group. One of these was Sarabanda, who had the intention to repeat the successes obtained by Karaoke, conducted by Fiorello, a program broadcast up to two years earlier on the same network and in the same time slot, taking advantage of the musical tradition. The transmission was entrusted to Enrico Papi (at the time known paparazzo and conductor of gossip and gossip reports), which, on the imposition of the same Gori, left the world of gossip (except then return in 2003 with Papirazzo) and completely revolutionized his look to conduct this new program.

=== Sarabanda (1997) ===
The first version of the program, whose first episode ever aired on September 8, 1997, at 7:45 pm, was based on the performance of musical pieces at the request of viewers, comedy moments and games. The songs were performed by Papi, Saraband (directed by Paolo Fantozzi) and Formula 3 (which will release a record with some of the performances performed at Sarabanda), while Gigi Vigliani performed in imitations for the comic part. The show also included a group of 130 boys and girls, called "coro" (choir), whose members sang and danced. The purpose of the transmission was that one song "pull" the other, trying to recreate the atmosphere of a rowdy party (i.e. a sarabanda, hence the name of the program). The lack of satisfactory listening (the average share data dropped to 4.39%) first led to a decrease in duration (from 55 to 45 minutes), then to a radical change in the format. The last of the episodes of this variety version, aired on October 11, 1997.

=== Sarabanda - il gioco della musica (1997-2002) ===
The transmission, transformed into a musical quiz, left on October 13, 1997, with the first edition, inheriting all the cast of the previous version but without the Formula 3 and Gigi Vigliani. Due to the failure of the variety version that preceded it, the program started quietly and then underwent a gradual increase in audience ratings over time and a greater interest of viewers. A few months after the start, the subtitle was added to the transmission logo, the game of music often mentioned by the conductor during the episodes, in which the 3 competitors competed in the various games. In this first edition, on October 27, 1997, the three historical singers of Saraband made their debut: Massimo Facchini said Mapo, Letizia Liberati and Loredana Maiuri (the latter already present in the transmission since the debut). One of the reasons why the program enjoyed an excellent listening was the prize money, which between February and March 1998 was the highest ever made available by a television quiz in Italy as well as numerous spectacular, curious or comic moments that surrounded the moment of the real quiz.

Given the good results obtained with this format, the program also continued during the months of June, July and partly in August and September with a short dedicated edition. So a new scenery was created, in combination with the summer season. This edition of the summer of 1998 left immediately after the conclusion of the first edition and ended immediately before the start of the second, going on pause for three weeks, from 3 to 22 August, after almost eleven months of consecutive programming of the broadcast. After the brief interruption, the broadcast resumed increasing the number of competitors from 3 to 4. In the second edition the study was renewed and the first great champions appeared, while on May 13, 1999, it came to celebrate the 500th overall episode. In these first editions, some of the choir boys used to perform in rotation singing and animating one of the songs evoked by the Pentagram game.

The third edition debuted with the graphics of some games renewed and the first bizarre competitors. Thanks to excellent listening, with a significant increase especially during the period of presence of the champion Antonietta Palladino, from April 2, 2000, the airing of the episodes covered the entire week, including Sunday. In the episode of Sunday, the last thirty seconds of transmission were dedicated to the funniest moments of the week just ended. On May 15, 2000, as part of the ceremony of the Gran Premio internazionale dello Spettacolo (broadcast the following day on Canale 5), Sarabanda was awarded the Telegatto as the best musical transmission, a prize that marks the consecration of the program. In this edition and for the first part of the following, between January and May and again between May and December 2000 the prize pool was (at the time) the highest ever made available by an Italian television program.

The fourth edition is remembered for the great prize money won, the readmission of some former champions of past editions and the achievement of the milestone of the thousand episodes in the quiz version March 28, 2001, in addition to the introduction of a corps de ballet that joined the choir. This period (third and fourth edition) was the most successful of the program, touching very high average listening points. Immediately after the conclusion of the fourth edition, from 17 June to 1 July 2001, a collection of 15 episodes was broadcast among the best of the edition just ended, called Le più belle di Sarabanda.

The fifth edition is marked by many changes, such as the change of the producer from Corrado Grego to Lino Tatalo (who brought the program to a new course), the increase in the duration of the program from 45 minutes to an hour and therefore also of the number of competitors and games (from 4 to 5), the return to the weekly strip of 6 episodes (on Sunday was no longer on the air), the graphics of the games completely changed, the involvement of viewers from home through phone games with jackpots at dedicated to them (only in this edition) and the presentation of the competitors, who entered the studio (the latter slightly renewed) one at a time presented by the tenant, while before they were present at the station since the beginning of the program. The management of Saraband passed to Massimo Idà. The beginning of this edition suffered a decline in ratings due above all to the concomitance with the September 11 attacks; to attract viewers, from this edition on, it was not uncommon for certain challenges to be prolonged across different advertising blocks, thus creating a certain suspense, or postponing the final game to the next day. It was then with the arrival of Valentina Locchi that the listeners had a strong rise: the maximum point of listening reached in an episode of the transmission was recorded on 6 May 2002 when 8,794,000 viewers (share of 31.50%) followed the final part of the episode that saw its elimination. Given the very high ratings and to protect Canale 5, Mediaset's flagship network, towards the end of the edition, from May 17, 2002, it was unexpectedly decided to bring the program to an early start from 8.00pm to 7.40pm, keeping the duration unchanged of an hour, returning to the usual start time from 22 May but being shortened by 20 minutes in the final part, suppressing a game and making the competitors fall from 5 to 4. This fact and the controversy with, creator of Striscia la notizia, probably contributed to the resignation of the then director of the network, Stefano Magnaghi, which was replaced by Luca Tiraboschi, director of Italia 1 until 2014.

=== Sarabanda (2002-2004) ===
After a long summer break, the program resumed with the sixth edition and many new features: the studio's scenography was completely modified making it bigger, conceived a short initial acronym (absent in previous editions) played and sung by Saraband (already appeared during the previous edition returning from advertising and the end of the episodes), updated the graphics of the games and finally the restyling of the logo of the program that replaced the present one since the variety version, also eliminating the subtitle "the game of music". From October 21, 2002, the transmission returned to the duration of one hour restoring the game deleted the previous edition and reporting the number of competitors to 5. This edition was the last of the most followed, especially during the period of presence of Gabriele Sbattella; in his last episode, that of 19 February 2003, where he was eliminated by Diego Canciani, the program obtained a record listening for the ordinary episodes, excluding the special: 5.849.000 spectators with a share of 20.30%, even if it is due to the second half of this edition the beginning of the descending parable of the broadcast culminated with the crisis of listening to the next edition. The program, in fact, oriented more on the show and the figure of the champion, focusing on its particularities, sometimes giving space to some competitors who became protagonists with curtains or performances. In this context the quiz was often put in the background to favor these moments. Given the new exploits of plays, Sarabanda was again shortened in the final part from March 13, 2003, this time of 15 minutes, suppressing a game and returning to 4 competitors.

For the seventh edition he changed the direction passing from Giuliana Baroncelli to Maurizio Spagliardi, while the transmission moved to Cinecittà, leaving the Elios studios from where it had always been recorded. From the end of October 2003 an audience of spectators was added, with whom Papi interacted from time to time. This season saw dizzying figures drop dramatically, due to the resounding success of Affari tuoi, broadcast on Rai 1 and conducted by Paolo Bonolis, in constant struggle with Striscia la notizia. From December 10, 2003, the duration returned to an hour, bringing the competitors back to 5. From January 2, 2004 the weekly strip of episodes was shortened, going on air only from Monday to Friday. The authors, to stem the decline in the share, tried to revolutionize the program in February 2004, changing all aspects of the game. The last episode of the classic editions aired on January 30, 2004.

=== Sarabanda - Scala & vinci (2004) ===
With the loss of interest from the public, the quiz was revived with a totally renewed formula, called Sarabanda - Scala & vinci, from February 2, 2004. There was no longer the trio Mapo, Letizia and Loredana, replaced by four girls called Bollicine: Simona Buccheri, Valentina Cesetti, Anna Montieri and Mariangela Argentino (with the last three, who only a few months before had participated in the second edition of the talent Popstars), while the body of dance had been replaced by seven girls (the Notines), who animated some of the new games, the boys of the choir went to form the audience of spectators and finally the authors were renamed "garanti" (guarantors). Saraband continued to be present regularly. The studio, the scenery, the graphics and the logo had been changed, the acronym was changed, both graphically and musically (Hey Ya! of the OutKast were used first, then In the Shadows by The Rasmus). The melodies proposed were no longer in the MIDI version but were fragments of original songs. In this new version the game was made less rigid than the previous one, allowing the competitors to think more calmly to the answer.

The only competitor to win the jackpot in ordinary episodes of this new version was Umberto Mari, who won €18,000, while in the only special episode aired (the first ever of this new version) David Guarnieri won €16,000. On February 20, 2004, following the poor results, the program was initially suspended for five weeks, on the decision of the same conductor, who was planning to alternate it with a new program that turned out to be 3, 2, 1 Baila; the alternation did not occur and therefore Sarabanda was canceled after six and a half years of presence in the palimpsests.

=== Super Sarabanda - Il torneo dei campioni (2005) ===
The program was resumed just over a year later, from March 14, 2005, under the name of Super Sarabande - The Champions Tournament in view of a series of special episodes with the most significant champions in the history of the program. The studio and the scenography changed again, the graphics were renewed, the audience continued to be present but the members were no longer the boys of the choir (which was eliminated from the program), while some girls and boys were introduced who acted as valets, replacing the Notines. They also returned Mapo and Letizia, but not Loredana, along with all the Saraband. The acronym and logo used between 2002 and 2004 also came back, but with slight modifications due to the new name of the program. The direction was entrusted to Lorenzo Lorenzini. The realization of the program saw a co-participation between Videotime and Duck On Line s.r.l.

This short version was structured as a tournament divided into two phases: the first, which lasted 12 episodes, saw facing four samples on the spot, of which only two could take points; at the end of this first phase, the seven champions who had scored the most points and a fished out among the excluded, moved on to the second phase. The second phase lasted 8 episodes and saw the remaining champions compete in direct matches, starting from the quarter-finals and then moving on to the semi-finals until the two finals between the two remaining champions. To win the tournament you had to win both finals, otherwise in the case of a final won a head playoff was necessary. The winner was Giulio de Pascale, who defeated Antonietta Palladino in both finals, winning €250,000 in prize money.

The episodes were broadcast from Monday to Friday and lasted just 20 minutes, from 8.45 pm to 9.15 pm (with the sole exception of the second final which aired on April 10, 2005, on Sunday, from 7:55 pm to 8pm: 25). These episodes constituted the swan song of the editions by Enrico Papi.

=== Sarabanda (2009) ===
From June 8, 2009, after more than four years, the quiz was re-proposed on Canale 5 during the pre-summer time, replacing, for the summer period, Chi vuol essere milionario?. The management was entrusted to Teo Mammucari with the participation of Belén Rodríguez. The program was aired from Monday to Friday (only in the first week was also broadcast on Saturday) and the episodes returned to be recorded in the Elios studios. In this edition the production passed to Endemol Italia. Of the old version only the director Massimo Idà, the chorister Letizia Liberati, the ballerina Valentina Simeone, the costume designer Maria Sabato, the author Alfredo Morabito and the executive producer Lino Tatalo remained. The audience remained and Saraband (whose members were almost all new), the choir was not recalled in the cast while the ballet was restored, albeit with only four dancers.

The first part of the program, from 6:50 pm to 7:00 pm, took the name of Quasi Sarabanda in which the competitors presented themselves and the first game took place. Some news about the editions of Papi, in addition to the new scenery, the study, the logo and the graphics of the games, were the presence of a sort of gazebo in the middle of the study and a pool in which Belén dived at the end of the episode. In addition, viewers from home are involved through a musical question that could be answered by text message or phone call and win a small amount of money in the form of a shopping card. The acronym was the song Move the Move by Sasà Flauto, sung by Belén Rodríguez and a chorus of voices.

There were four competitors in the race, one of which was replaced by the champion after being eliminated in the first game. The prize money started from 50,000 euros, a figure from which it would have started again in case of victory. The current champion of the last episode conducted by Papi was not called (although he had repeatedly stated in 2004 in case of return of the transmission), so he left completely with new competitors.

In this edition the only competitor to complete the 7 × 30 was Elena Gliaschera, from Moncalieri, who won 72,000 euros. The regular bets ended on 1 August, while from 3 until 21 August 15 episodes were repeated in reply, pending the start of the tournament at the end of the month. On August 24, the Tournament of Champions began, which saw protagonists all the champions of the edition and the best challengers which lasted the whole week, including Saturday and Sunday. The final aired on August 30 and saw Stefania Rumagnoli as winner, who won the prize money of 100,000 euros.

=== Sarabanda (2017) ===
After almost eight years of absence, the program is back on air live for three special episodes in prime time on Italia 1 starting from June 13, 2017, with the conduct of the historic presenter of the quiz, Enrico Papi after more than twelve years from his last episode. As for the cast, the presences of Saraband (whose only return is that of the drummer Liano Chiappa), of the ballet and the audience, have been confirmed while about twenty people have been added on the model of the old choir. There were the returns of the two historical authors Nicola De Feo and Pietro Gorini, to which were added Massimiliano Novaresi, Marco Pantaleo, Gian Luca Belardi and Alessandro Santucci, while the direction was entrusted to Sergio Colabona. The production of the program was by RTI with the participation of EndemolShine Italy.

Numerous innovations, including live television (just like when the broadcast was still a variety) and the radio: the broadcast went on air at the same time also on Radio 105, radio partner official program, where Daniele Battaglia, Alan Caligiuri and Matteo Lotti have commented live on every episode of the 105 Take Away radio program in a station set up in the same studio where the program was broadcast. Alongside the Saraband in the performance of some songs there were also resident DJ Marnik. The program also aired in high definition on Italia 1 HD and for the first time in 16:9 format (previously it has always aired in 4:3). The study from where the program was broadcast is the historic Teatro 1 of the Elios Studios, renewed with a new set design. Also new is the transmission logo, game graphics and backing tracks in the new MP3 format. The acronym was Mooseca, the first single by Papi, which takes its name from the famous distortion of the word musica (music) used by the conductor in the first editions of the program to kick off the Saraband to the performance of a song. Another novelty is the Social Room, which has seen two young people (Francesco and Riccardo), with whom Papi has often connected to interact with social networks, through the hashtag #Sarabanda, on the progress of the episode and to send in wave some memes. Further introduction were the imitations in which Enrico Papi was delighted for the part of entertainment. The first part of the program, lasting about ten minutes, acted as a preview with a short monologue by Papi and took the name of Sarà Banda. The beginning of the program was anticipated by six short episodes entitled Provini Sarabanda, lasting about five minutes, airing between 5 and 12 June, in the late afternoon on Italia 1, where some "pills" were aired. casting new competitors to be selected to challenge historic champions. On the 20th of June, in the time slot of the access prime time, a two-minute episode was aired, which soon summarized the first episode of this new edition.

The tournament was structured on three episodes, broadcast on Tuesday every week. The first two episodes saw four historical champions of the program compete against four new competitors (a total of eight historic champions and eight new competitors were involved). The winners of the first two episodes qualified directly for the final phase, while the third and final finalist was the winner of the third episode, contested among ten of the fourteen eliminated from the previous two episodes. The final phase was played at the end of the third episode and saw one of the new competitors win, Fabrizio Micò.

== Champions with more presences ==
Contestant	City of origin	Number of participations	Edition	No. episodes won	Period of participation
David Guarnieri	Rome	1	4-5	124	3 March to 5 October 2001
Antonietta Palladino	Rome	1	3	86	14 February to 16 May 2000
Gabriele Sbattella	Porto San Giorgio	1	6	79	12 November 2002 to 19 February 2003
Valentina Locchi	Perugia	1	5	74	8 February to 6 May 2002
Giulio de Pascale	Rome	1	5-6	70	8 May to 12 November 2002
Boris Carta	Cairo Montenotte	1	3-4	64	18 May to 9 September 2000
Marco Manuelli	Florence	2	2-3 (first participation) 4 (second participation)	57 (41 in the first participation, 16 in the second participation)	26 May to 22 September 1999 (first participation) 30 November to 16 December 2000 (second participation)
Diego Canciani	Sabaudia	1	6	47	19 February to 15 April 2003

== Top five jackpots won in a single episode ==
Contestant	Edition	Episode	Jackpot won in lire	Jackpot won in euros
Marco Manuelli	4	December 11, 2000	Lit. 1,100,000,000	–
Valentina Locchi	5	March 30, 2002	–	324.000
Diego Canciani	6	March 26, 2003	–	288.000
David Guarnieri	4	March 12, 2001	Lit. 500,000,000	–
David Guarnieri	4	April 9, 2001	Lit. 500,000,000	–

== Specials early evening ==
Name of the special	Airdate	Contestants	Winner	Jackpot won	Trophy
Sarabanda - Speciale 425 milioni	April 8, 1998	Barbara Fusco, Claudio Ricci, Daniela Caon, Emilia Della Guardia, Erasmo Marini, Fiorella de Lisi, Giovanni Paglierini, Luciano Mondini, Luciano Tirelli, Luigi Palmieri, Massimo Bertucci, Paolo Migani, Renato Giovanile, Rita Capellani, Roberto D'Armini	Luciano Tirelli	Lit. 425,000,000	NO
Sarabanda Special	May 13, 1998	Edoardo Vianello, Mino Reitano, Little Tony, Donatella Rettore, Ambra Angiolini, Tosca, Francesca Alotta, Scialpi	Tosca	Lit. 100,000,000	NO
Sarabanda - Il Match	October 31, 2000	Boris Carta, Antonietta Palladino, Gianni Faraone, Giovanna Gastaudo	Gianni Faraone	Lit. 200,000,000	YES
Sarabanda - Il Match	February 14, 2001	Roberto Serrentino, Boris Carta, Cesare Borrometi, Marco Manuelli, Adriano Battistoni, Graziella Arcuri, Gianpaolo Satta, Antonietta Palladino, Giovanna Gastaudo, Raffaele Caso	Boris Carta	Lit. 250,000,000	YES
I più forti	May 15, 2001	Red team: David Guarnieri (spokesman, central game station), Marco Ravanelli (game station 1), Cesare Borrometi (2), Adriano Battistoni (3), Emilio Morabito (4), Boris Carta (5), Graziella Arcuri (6) Blue team: Antonietta Palladino (spokesman, central game station), Marco Balestri (game station 1), Gianpaolo Satta (2), Marco Manuelli (3), Gianni Faraone (4), Giovanna Gastaudo (5), Cristiano Misceo (6)	Blue team	Lit. 204,000,000	YES
I più forti	November 7, 2001	Red team (Champions team): Gianni Faraone (spokesman, central game station), Cesare Borrometi (game station 1), Antonietta Palladino (2), David Guarnieri (3), Marco Manuelli (4) Blue team (Challengers team): Rita Capellani (spokesman, central game station), Pier Luigi Pardocchi (game station 1), Massimo d'Agata (2), Roberto Bortoli (3), Mario Bonatti (4)	Red team	Lit. 152,000,000	YES
Sarabanda - Buon anno	December 31, 2001	Marco di Renzo - Anna, Luciana Sina - Alfonso, Dario Bianco - ?, Maria Teresa Storcè - ?	Marco di Renzo - Anna	Lit. 50,000,000, Lit. 5,000,000	?
I più forti	January 29, 2002				
I più forti	February 5, 2002				
I più forti	February 12, 2002				
Sarabanda	September 15, 2002	Cesare Borrometi, Marco Manuelli, Valentina Locchi, David Guarnieri, Boris Carta	Valentina Locchi	€50.000	NO
Sarabanda - La sfida	December 22, 2002	Giulio de Pascale, Valentina Locchi, Gabriele Sbattella, Marco Manuelli, David Guarnieri	Giulio de Pascale	Check present inside the trophy	YES
Sarabanda - La sfida	September 21, 2003	Valentina Locchi, Giulio de Pascale, Antonietta Palladino, David Guarnieri, Diego Canciani	Diego Canciani	Check present inside the trophy	YES

== The Super Sarabanda tournament ==
Contestants	City of origin	Edition							
Contestants	City of origin	1	Summer 1998	2	3	4	5	6	7
Marco Manuelli	Florence								
Antonietta Palladino	Rome								
Gabriele Sbattella	Porto San Giorgio								
Cesare Borrometi	Noto								
David Guarnieri	Rome								
Raffaele Caso	Naples								
Gianni Faraone	Cairo Montenotte								
Gianpaolo Satta	Sassari								
Diego Canciani	Sabaudia								
Massimo d'Agata	Napoli								
Boris Carta	Cairo Montenotte								
Ilaria de Benedictis	Campoli Appennino								
Emilio Morabito									
Giovanna Gastaudo	Alassio								
Giulio de Pascale	Rome								
Valentina Locchi	Perugia								

=== First stage ===
Episode	Contestant (points in Terzetto)	7×30
1	Boris (1), Marco (2), Gianni (0), Valentina (2)	Marco-Valentina 6-6 (Marco win 2–1 at the Spareggione)
2	Massimo (0), Antonietta (2), Ilaria (1), Gabriele (2)	Antonietta-Gabriele 6–7
3	Diego (2), Emilio (0), Cesare (2), Giovanna (1)	Diego-Cesare 7-7 (Diego win 2–0 at the Spareggione)
4	Giulio (1), Gianpaolo (2), David (2), Raffaele (1)	Gianpaolo-David 6–7
5	Boris (2), Ilaria (0), Gabriele (2), Emilio (1)	Boris-Gabriele 7–6
6	Marco (2), Massimo (1), Antonietta (2), Gianni (0)	Marco-Antonietta 6–7
7	Diego (2), David (0), Giulio (2), Gianpaolo (0)	Diego-Giulio 6-6 (Giulio wins 2–0 at the Spareggione)
8	Cesare (2), Giovanna (1), Raffaele (0), Valentina (2)	Cesare-Valentina 6-6 (Valentina wins 2–1 at the Spareggione)
9	Giulio (2), Ilaria (0), Gianni (2), Antonietta (1)	Giulio-Gianni 7–5
10	Massimo (0), David (2), Emilio (0), Valentina (2)	David-Valentina 7–5
11	Marco (2), Gabriele (0), Diego (2), Raffaele (0)	Marco-Diego 6–7
12	Cesare (2), Giovanna (0), Boris (2), Gianpaolo (0)	Cesare-Boris 7–5

=== Classification ===
Pos.	Name	Points	Qualified for second stage
1	Diego	5	YES
2	Giulio	4	YES
3	David	4	YES
4	Valentina	4	YES
5	Cesare	4	YES
6	Marco	4	YES
7	Antonietta	3	YES
8	Boris	3	NO
8	Gabriele	3	NO
10	Gianni	1	NO
10	Gianpaolo	1	NO
12	Giovanna	0	NO
12	Raffaele	0	YES
12	Ilaria	0	NO
12	Emilio	0	NO
12	Massimo	0	NO

== Controversy ==
=== The Antonio De Ponte case ===
On March 9, 1998, a competitor of Naples, Antonio De Ponte, won the sum of 425 million lire, completing the 7×30 in his debut episode. It was then learned, through some reports of the public in Striscia la notizia, that he made an accurate service and unmasked it, that he had taken part from 17 to 19 November 1997, that is a little less than four months before, to Ciao Mara, Canale 5 program conducted by Mara Venier, (also winning on that occasion, 20 million lire) and in contravention of the Mediaset business rule that prevented a competitor from a quiz from returning to compete in another by 12 o'clock months. As a result, in the episode of March 18, 1998 was announced the disqualification (albeit when it had lost the title as a champion already 8 episodes) and the withdrawal of the sum won, which was up for grabs in what was the first special episode in prime time of the quiz, which aired on 8 April 1998. On 17 April 2001, the judge Antonio Macrì of the Court of Rome condemned Mediaset to the return to De Ponte of the sum won plus the legal interest following his appeal, confirming the sentence issued on June 27, 2000.

=== Mediaset vs Einstein Multimedia ===
In May 2001, Mediaset and Einstein Multimedia found themselves in conflict with who actually was the real producer of the transmission. The case arose from a lawsuit initiated some time ago by Mediaset towards the same Einstein Multimedia, producer of Quiz Show, Rai 1 program, due to a suspected plagiarism against Chi vuol essere miliardario?, produced by Aran Endemol. The house of Roman production, irritated by the fact, came to the hypothesis of a possible transfer of the transmissions that contributed to realize for Mediaset, and therefore also Sarabanda, to other networks.

=== Telephone games not regular? ===
On January 14, 2002, the Codacons and the Italian Quizzistica Association, through a press release, raised some concerns regarding a preliminary game proposed between the end of December 2001 and the beginning of January 2002 and aimed at viewers from home, of which only some would have been selected (after having called the editorial office) to try to win a sum of money thanks to a telephone game on January 4, 2002. The choice of the three viewers who participated on January 4 was criticized: they were not selected on the basis of phone calls made in drafting and the correct answers provided regarding the preliminary game, but were chosen at random by telephone directories. It was also suspected that the phone calls sent were not true, since in all three cases the jackpot win failed for a while.

=== The Max case, the masked competitor ===
On May 26, 2002, Codacons and the Italian Quizzistica Association forwarded a complaint to the Telecommunications Authority against transmission due to the presence of a masked competitor (the champion Giulio de Pascale, who presented himself with the fictitious name Max) against whom they supported the fact that it led to the rights of competitors excluded from auditions because they were too well known and also that it was a ploy to raise the audience.

=== Sarabanda under investigation ===
On July 12, 2002, the broadcast ended under investigation (as well as other quizzes of other networks) due to a suspected violation of Article 4, Law 410/89 ( interventions in the gaming industry and clandestine betting to protect the correctness in the performance of competitive competitions ). The allegations were related to the fact that the transmission would never have asked for or obtained the authorization of the Ministry of Finance to exercise the role of quiz with prizes and also that the telephone numbers that the aspiring competitors composed to support the auditions were not regulations, i.e. that the cost of charging was too high and was going to contribute significantly to the growth of the jackpots at stake during the episodes. Also Enrico Papi was entered in the register of suspects because of the accusations due to the management of his personal internet site, through which, with a booking number, one could try to participate in the transmission. On March 28, 2007, the trial ended after the declaration of non-place to proceed due to prescription.

=== The Don Enzo case ===
On 12 February 2004 the defending champion Don Vincenzo Passante, known as Don Enzo, at the time known as having supported the auditions of Grande Fratello 4, left the post of champion without participating in his second episode by that, appearing only before the conclusion of the episode to explain the reason: the bishop of his city had not given him permission to participate in the program.

=== Belén and the Moige ===
In the 2009 edition the program was criticized by the Moige due to the filming related to the body of Belén Rodríguez, judged too explicit and considered mortifying for the female figure. The association declared Canale 5 "network out" of the month both in June and in July.

=== Doubts about the veracity of the program and technical problems ===
In the special edition of 2017, after the second of the three episodes, more comments on several posts on Facebook by Francesco Marrazzo, one of the new competitors, who had been eliminated, raised doubts about the spontaneity of the competitors in the race, widening the field also to veracity aspects of the game. However, the controversy was soon re-entered when Marrazzo later denied any doubt stating that there is no pre-established script in the program and that its elimination was regular.

The same edition, probably due to the fact of being broadcast live, has been affected by various technical problems: faulty buttons, missed starting of the musical bases to guess, incorrect graphics, not updated or not synchronized with the progress of the game, difficulty from the director to show replays and screens turned off. Sometimes it was necessary to resort to sending advertising to solve the most complex problems.

== Curiosity ==
- The quiz version was extremely similar to another quiz produced a few years earlier by the Fininvest networks, titled Quel motivetto ... and conducted by Raimondo Vianello in the Canale 5 pre-ward in the summer of 1990 in which, among the games, embryonic versions were proposed of the Asta musicale and of the 7 × 30 with the latter which provided for the participation of a single competitor.
- In May 1999 Sarabanda was the victim of a joke by the Canale 5 broadcast Il grande bluff. As a competitor of an episode, Pupo was in fact sent, who, specially rigged and hardly recognizable, with his pedantic and eccentric behavior made Enrico Papi embarrass, with the collaboration of three other competitors-actors and the complicity of the defending champion, who immediately he got rid of. The joke was transmitted in full to Sarabanda in a special episode not valid for the race, also because it was never finished because Pupo was unmasked before the end of 7 × 30 after being "discovered" with the titles of the songs written on the wrists . The episode aired June 5, 1999, the day after it was broadcast by Il grande bluff on Canale 5. The episode was originally scheduled to go on May 15, 1999, but was replaced by an actual episode.
- In December 1999, home viewers were asked to choose an Italian song to "save" from the millennium that was ending and "bring it" to the next one. You could vote by phone, leaving your preference to the editorial office. In the last episodes of the month, Papi sang the ten most voted songs, presented as a clue to the musical auction. They were: Sapore di sale, Mamma, Il mare, Questo piccolo grande amore, Roma nun fa' la stupida stasera, Nel blu dipinto di blu, Per te, La canzone del sole, Nessun dorma and 'O sole mio, with the latter which turned out to be the most voted.
- Program references are present in the song Mooseca by the same Enrico Papi, as well as in the related musical videoclip, which is partly used as the theme song for the program in 2017.

== Awards ==
- 1998 - Award for Best TV scenography of the year for the Mediaset programs
- 2000 - Telegatto for Best music TV program

== Bibliography ==
- Joseph Baroni (2005). Dizionario della Televisione. Raffaello Cortina Editore. ISBN 88-7078-972-1.
