= Thais Souza Wiggers =

Brazilian showgirl

Thais Souza
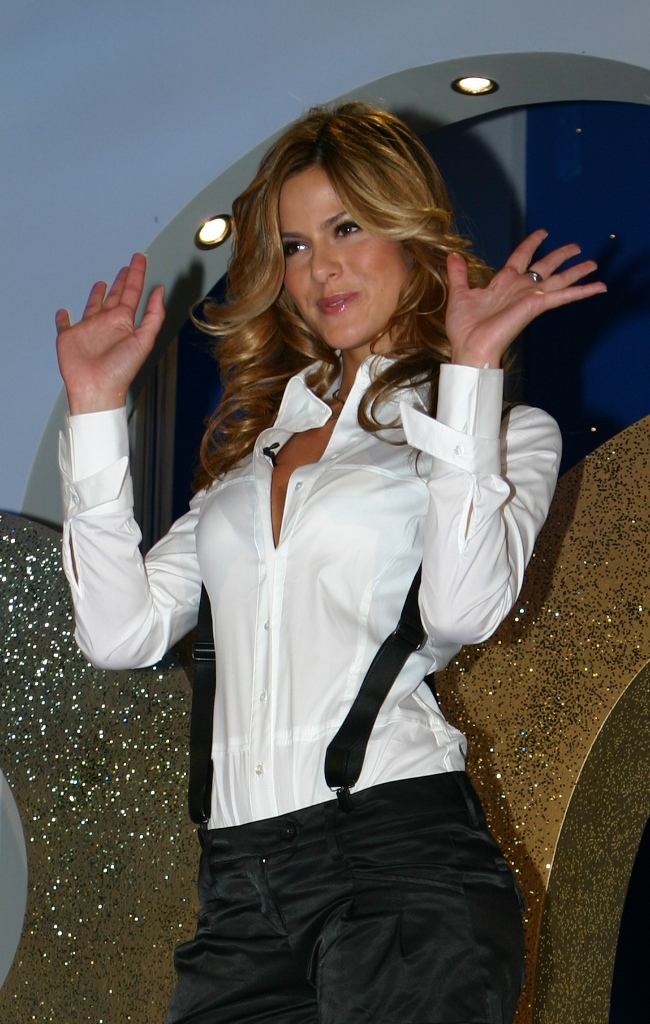
- Born: October 24, 1985 (age 40); Florianópolis, Brazil
- Occupation: television presenter
- Modeling information
- Height: 1.75 m (5 ft 9 in)
- Hair color: Blonde
- Eye color: Brown

Thais Souza (born Florianópolis, 24 October 1985) is a Brazilian television presenter and model. She was a showgirl in the Italian satirical series Striscia la notizia.

== Biography ==
=== Career ===
Thais started her career in the fashion industry at fourteen and since 2000 she took part in different beauty contest such as Face Summer. She traveled to Miami, where she finished high school while continuing to maintain her commitments as a model. In 2004 she was part of two advertising campaigns of TIM with supermodels Adriana Lima and Naomi Campbell. In the same year she decided to move to Italy where she worked as a model and later starred in some television commercials. In Summer 2005 she was chosen as a showgirl for the satirical television program Striscia la notizia. The program was broadcast on Channel 5 and Thais gained popularity alongside Melissa Satta. She worked for the program until her maternity leave in 2008. After the birth of her daughter she returned in TV and hosted the GXT program American Gladiators with Pierluigi Pardo.

In July 2009, Thais participated as a member of the jury (with Alba Parietti, Jonathan Kashanian, Raffaella Fico and Sofia Bruscoli) in the Italian final of The Look of the Year, a beauty contest conducted by Cristina Chiabotto and Tommy Vee. In 2011, Thais guest starred in the sitcom Favelas, bed and breakfast, that aired on Comedy Central, with the comedy duo Pali and Dispari. In the fall of 2012 she was the protagonist of the video tutorial dedicated to smash Brazilian Eu Quero Tchu Eu Quero Tcha.

=== Private life ===
From 2006 to 2009 she had a relationship with TV presenter Teo Mammucari, and in June 2008 she gave birth to a girl, Julia.

Since 2010, she is in a relationship with the former correspondent of the TV program Le Iene Paul Baccaglini.
