= Teo Mammucari =

Italian actor and television presenter

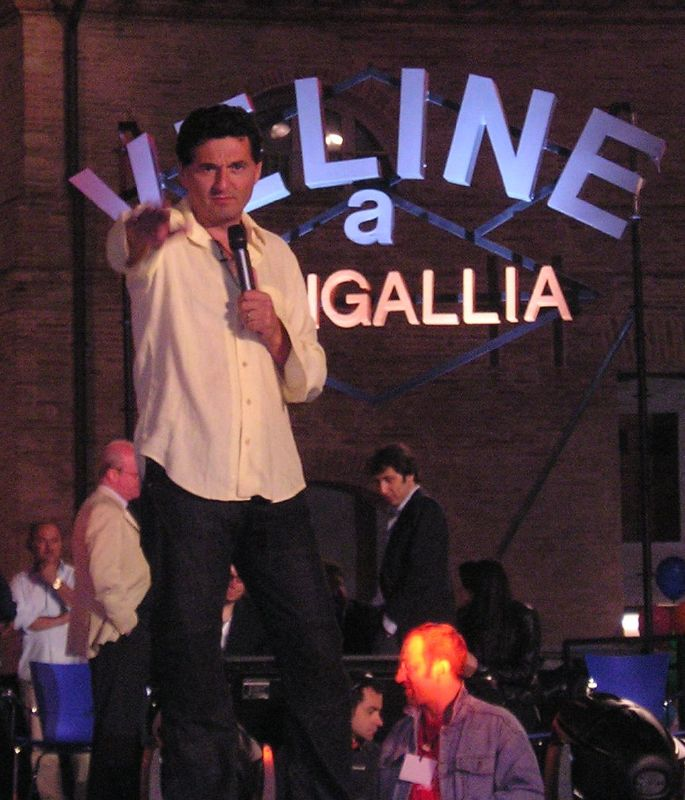
- Mammucari in 2004
- Born: Teodoro Mammucari; 12 August 1964 (age 61); Rome, Italy
- Occupation: Television host
- Years active: 1994 – present
- Partner(s): Samantha De Grenet; Thais Souza Wiggers
- Children: 1 daughter

Teo Mammucari (born Teodoro Mammucari; 12 August 1964) is an Italian television presenter, actor and singer.

== Biography ==
In 1994 he started working as an actor for Scherzi a parte and then as host of Seven Show on broadcaster Europa 7. In 1999 he appeared in Le Iene (The Hyenas), a television program broadcast on the Italian channel Italia 1. He had great success in 2000 when he hosted Libero, broadcast on Rai 2. The program, based on prank phone calls, was anchored by Mammucari for four editions. In the summer of 2002 and 2004 he hosted the television program Veline, aimed at the girls who will take part in the program Striscia la notizia. In the summer of 2003 he hosted Velone, a variety show in which the aspiring competitors have the characteristic of being old. He then presented Mio fratello è Pakistano (2005), Distraction (2006 and 2007), Cultura Moderna (2006 and 2007, together with the Brazilian model Juliana Moreira), Primo e Ultimo (2008), Scherzi a parte (2009, with Claudio Amendola and Belén Rodríguez) and Sarabanda (2009, with Belen Rodriguez). In autumn 2012, Mammucari hosted Lo show dei record, broadcast on Canale 5. In 2013, he presented La grande magia – The Illusionist (format created by Roberto Cenci), aired on Canale 5, a new talent show for young illusionists.

As an actor, he starred in the cinema with the film Witches to the North (2001) by Giovanni Veronesi and in the television series Piper (2009), based on the 2007 TV movie by Carlo Vanzina of the same title. As a singer he launched in 2004 the summer hit "Nando", followed by "WWW sciogliamo i Pooh".

== Television ==
- Forum di sera (Rete 4, 1997), co-host
- Seven Show (Italia 7, 1999)
- Libero (Rai 2, 2000, 2002–2004)
- Veline (Canale 5, 2002, 2004)
- Velone (Canale 5, 2003)
- Mio fratello è pakistano (Canale 5, 2005)
- Distraction (Italia 1, 2006–2007)
- Cultura moderna (Canale 5, 2006–2007, 2016-)
- Primo e ultimo (Italia 1, 2008)
- Scherzi a parte (Canale 5, 2009)
- Sarabanda (Canale 5, 2009)
- Fenomenal (Italia 1, 2010–2011)
- The Call – Chi ha paura di Teo Mammucari? (Italia 1, 2010)
- Wind Music Awards (Italia 1, 2011)
- The Cube – La sfida (Italia 1, 2011)
- Lo show dei record (Canale 5, 2012)
- La grande magia – The Illusionist (Canale 5, 2013)
- Le Iene (Italia 1, 1999, 2013-)
- Jump! Stasera mi tuffo (Canale 5, 2013)

== Filmography ==
- Witches to the North, directed by Giovanni Veronesi (2001)
- Piper, directed by Francesco Vicario – TV series (2009)
