= The Potter's Field (Camilleri novel) =

2008 novel by Andrea Camilleri

- First edition (Italy)
- Author: Andrea Camilleri
- Original title: Il campo del vasaio
- Translator: Stephen Sartarelli
- Language: Italian/Sicilian
- Series: Inspector Salvo Montalbano, #13
- Genre: Crime, Mystery novel
- Publisher: Penguin Books (English)
- Publication date: 20 March 2008
- Publication place: Italy, Sicily
- English publication date: 2011
- Media type: Print (Hardcover, Paperback)
- ISBN: 0-14-312013-1 (Eng. trans.)
- Preceded by: The Track of Sand
- Followed by: The Age of Doubt

The Potter's Field (Italian: Il campo del vasaio) is a 2008 novel by Andrea Camilleri, translated into English in 2011 by Stephen Sartarelli. It is the thirteenth novel in the internationally popular Inspector Montalbano series.

== Summary ==
After a disturbing dream, where his Chief Bonetti-Alderighi comes crying at Montalbano's door begging to be hidden and protected from the Mafia, which has taken political power and Mafioso Totò Riina has become prime minister, the Inspector is woken up by a window shutter banging against the wall and soon later by another banging, at the door, by Catarella who, as usual, announces the finding of a corpse.

Under a steady downpour and between various expletives, the Inspector and his men, including a grumpy Mimì Augello, Montalbano's deputy, succeed in retrieving the dead body, cut into pieces inside a bag and buried in a field of clay used by potters. Complicating the investigation is the strange behaviour of Augello, who has become morose and quarrelsome, thus making hell for everyone at the police station. Trying to understand what is happening to his deputy, Montalbano discovers that Mimì is betraying his wife with another woman and telling lies about him being engaged in police activities that keep him busy all night. So the Inspector enlists the help of his Swedish friend Ingrid, whom he asks to tail Mimì and find out what he's doing and who the other woman is.

Meanwhile the investigation into the cut-up body, impossible to identify, becomes even more entangled due to a complaint by the beautiful South American Dolores whose husband, a ship officer, has disappeared. A not unimportant fact is that the officer was a distant relation of Mafia boss Balduccio Sinagra.

What with the search for the missing husband, Augello's strange behaviour, and old mafiosi rituals which recall biblical passages (the Gospel's "the potter’s field, to bury strangers in", Matthew 27:7), Montalbano's faith in his closest friends begins to falter.
