= You've Got Mail (talk show franchise) =

International television talk show franchise

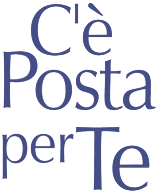
- Logo of original Italian version
- Original work: C'è posta per te
- Years: 2000–present

Miscellaneous
- Genre: Talk show
- First aired: 12 January 2000; 26 years ago

You've Got Mail is an international television talk show franchise in which individuals are invited to receive and respond to personal messages, often involving emotional reunions, unresolved conflicts, or major life revelations. The format originated with the Italian program C'è posta per te, which premiered in 2000, and has since been adapted in multiple countries. Episodes typically center on relationships between people such as family members, romantic partners, or estranged friends.

== Format ==
The typical structure of You've Got Mail is the following:

- A participant (the "sender") asks the program to help deliver a message to another person (the "recipient").
- The recipient is tracked down and given an invitation to the studio by a postman character. The postman does not disclose who the sender is.
- The sender and recipient both arrive at the studio and are separated by a physical barrier.
- After the host makes conversation with both the sender and the recipient, the sender's identity and message are revealed, frequently recounting shared history or addressing unresolved issues.
- The recipient ultimately decides whether to accept the message – symbolized by opening the barrier and meeting the sender – or reject it. This decision typically forms the emotional climax of each segment.

== Origins ==
The franchise originated in Italy with C'è posta per te, created and hosted by Maria De Filippi and first broadcast on Mediaset's Canale 5 in 2000. The program became one of Italy's most popular television shows and served as the basis for international adaptations.

== International versions ==
According to la Repubblica as of 2025, the show's concept had been exported to 24 countries. International versions include:

| Country | Title | TV station | Host | Dates |
|---|---|---|---|---|
| Arab world | المسامح كريم; Al Mousameh Karim | OSN | George Kordahi | 2014–present |
| Bulgaria | Имаш поща Imash posha | Nova | Gala | 2005–2008; 2012–2013 |
| Czech Republic | Pošta pro tebe | ČT1 | Ester Janečková; Barbora Kodetová (2005) | 2005–2022 |
| France | Y'a que la vérité qui compte | TF1 (2002–2006); C8 (2022–2025); W9 (2025–present) | Pascal Bataille and Laurent Fontaine | 2002–2006; 2022–present |
| Italy | C'è posta per te | Canale 5 | Maria De Filippi | 2000–present |
| Romania | O scrisoare pentru tine | Acasă | Carmen Tănase | 2007–? |
| Romania | Am ceva să-ţi spun | Antena 1 | Sonia Simionov | 2015 |
| Slovakia | Pošta pre teba | Jednotka | Katarína Brychtová | 2004–2014 |
| Spain | Hay una carta para ti | Antena 3 | Isabel Gemio | 2002–2004 |
| Spain | Hay una cosa que te quiero decir | Telecinco | Jorge Javier Vázquez; Jordi González (2014) | 2012–2015; 2025–present |
| Ukraine | Ключовий момент Klyuchoviy moment | Inter | Natalya Sumska | 2003–2009 |

The show is also similar in concept to the Dutch program Het spijt me (I'm Sorry) first broadcast in 1993. In this format, people send each other messages of apology, and the sender's identity is not initially hidden.
