= Italia's Got Talent =

Italian television talent show

- Created by: Simon Cowell
- Directed by: Roberto Cenci (2009–2013)
- Presented by: Simone Annicchiarico; Geppi Cucciari; Belen Rodriguez; Vanessa Incontrada; Lodovica Comello; Aurora Leone; Gianluca Fru
- Judges: Rudy Zerbi; Maria De Filippi; Gerry Scotti; Luciana Littizzetto; Nina Zilli; Frank Matano; Federica Pellegrini; Mara Maionchi; Claudio Bisio; Joe Bastianich; Khaby Lame; Elettra Lamborghini

Production
- Producers: Fascino PGT; Grundy Italia
- Running time: 180 minutes
- Production companies: FremantleMedia; Sycotv

Original release
- Network: Canale 5 (2009–2013); Sky Uno/TV8 (2015–2022); Disney+ (2023–)
- Release: 12 December 2009 – present

Italia's Got Talent is the Italian version of the international Got Talent series. The pilot episode was aired on 12 December 2009 on Canale 5 and it was seen by 5.3 million people. After this episode, Mediaset decided to hold on this show with a full-length season. The first season started on 12 April 2010 with high ratings and continued broadcasting. Rudy Zerbi, Maria De Filippi, and Gerry Scotti are the three judges.

The sixth series (2015) will face many changes. It has been aired by pay-TV Sky Uno, the entertainment-purposed channel of Sky Italy, owned by News Corporation. The host is Spanish-born Italian actress and model Vanessa Incontrada. No judges from the previous series have been confirmed: the new panel face the arrival of actor Claudio Bisio, actress and comedian Luciana Littizzetto, singer Nina Zilli and YouTube star Frank Matano. Talents are competing for €100,000. The final has been simulcast by Sky Uno and Cielo.

In the ninth series (2018) the judging panel have been changed. Singer-songwriter Nina Zilli has been replaced by Olympic Swimmer Federica Pellegrini and Actress-Comedian Luciana Littizzetto will be replaced by Mara Maionchi. Claudio Bisio and Frank Matano will stay on the show with Lodovica Comello.

The seventh season, starting in March 2016, is being aired in simulcast on Sky Uno and TV8, a brand-new free channel of Sky Italia, together with Planet's Got Talent, and a new host, Lodovica Comello. Starting with the thirteenth season, the show will air on Disney+.

== Judges and host ==
Season	Host		Judges (in order of first appearance)			
1 (2009-2010)	Simone Annicchiarico	Geppi Cucciari	Gerry Scotti	Maria De Filippi	Rudy Zerbi	—N/a
2 (2011)	Simone Annicchiarico	Geppi Cucciari	Gerry Scotti	Maria De Filippi	Rudy Zerbi	—N/a
3 (2012)	Simone Annicchiarico	Belén Rodríguez	Gerry Scotti	Maria De Filippi	Rudy Zerbi	—N/a
4 (Spring 2013)	Simone Annicchiarico	Belén Rodríguez	Gerry Scotti	Maria De Filippi	Rudy Zerbi	—N/a
5 (Autumn 2013)	Simone Annicchiarico	Belén Rodríguez	Gerry Scotti	Maria De Filippi	Rudy Zerbi	—N/a
6 (2015)	Vanessa Incontrada	—N/a	Frank Matano	Luciana Littizzetto	Nina Zilli	Claudio Bisio
7 (2016)	Lodovica Comello	—N/a	Frank Matano	Luciana Littizzetto	Nina Zilli	Claudio Bisio
8 (2017)	Lodovica Comello	—N/a	Frank Matano	Luciana Littizzetto	Nina Zilli	Claudio Bisio
9 (2019)	Lodovica Comello	—N/a	Frank Matano	Mara Maionchi	Federica Pellegrini	Claudio Bisio
10 (2020)	Lodovica Comello	—N/a	Frank Matano	Mara Maionchi	Federica Pellegrini	Joe Bastianich
11 (2021)	Lodovica Comello	—N/a	Frank Matano	Mara Maionchi	Federica Pellegrini	Joe Bastianich
12 (2022)	Lodovica Comello	—N/a	Frank Matano	Mara Maionchi	Federica Pellegrini	Elio
13 (2023)	Gianluca Fru	Aurora Leone	Frank Matano	Mara Maionchi	Elettra Lamborghini	Khaby Lame
14 (2025)	Gianluca Fru	Aurora Leone	Frank Matano	Mara Maionchi	Elettra Lamborghini	Alessandro Cattelan

== Season 1 (2009–2010) ==
=== Final ===
Order	Finished	Artist	song
1		Truzzi Volanti	Acrobats
2	Runner-up	Federico Fattinger	Singer-songwriter
3		Aldo Nicolini	Illusionist
4		Note di sabbia	Sand animation, musician
5	Top 6	Alfredo Marasco	Guitarist
6	Top 6	Miss Lolita	Drag Queen
7		Cristian Esposito	Drummer
8	Top 6	I Regina	Cover band (Queen)
9		C'era una volta	Artist, musician
10	Winner	Carmen Masola	Opera singer
11		Dangerous Game	Dance group
12	Top 6	Demis Facchinetti	Singer-songwriter

=== Ratings ===
Show	Date	Viewers	Share
Auditions 1	12 December	5,300,000	26.62%
Auditions 2	12 April	5,976,000	27.42%
Auditions 3	19 April	5,382,000	24.50%
Auditions 4	26 April	5,318,000	24.60%
Semi-final 1	3 May	5,365,000	26.63%
Semi-final 2	10 May	5,197,000	26.40%
Final	17 May	5,879,000	27.22%
	Average	5,489,000	26.20%

== Season 2 (2011) ==
=== Final ===
Order	Finished	Artist	Act
1		The Mnai's	Hip Hop dancers
2	Top 6	ABC	Sing in Italian Sign Language
3	Winner	Fabrizio Vendramin	Painter in music
4	Top 6	Elena Disarò	Singer
5	Top 6	Simone Calati	Fakir
6		Anna Maria Bianchi	Singer
7		Nicola Bruni	Acrobat
8		Piccola Orchestra Malarazza	Singers
9		Famiglia Gibboni	Musicians
10	Top 6	Angels Prut	Singers comedians
11		Daniele Pacini (LaLa McCallan)	Singer en travesti
12	Runner-up	Fratelli Pellegrini	Acrobats

=== Ratings ===
Show	Date	Viewers	Share
Auditions 1	7 May	3,974,000	19.89%
Auditions 2	14 May	4,752,000	23.48%
Auditions 3	21 May	5,457,000	27.87%
Auditions 4	28 May	5,385,000	27.21%
Semi-final	4 June	5,933,000	33.69%
Final	11 June	6,402,000	33.14%
	Average	5,317,000	27.55%

== Season 3 (2012) ==
=== Final ===
Order	Finished	Artist	Act
1		Emil Faccoli	Hip Hop dancer
2		Le ShortGirls	Special marionette
3		Devin De Bianchi	Acrobat
4	Top 6	Salvo Randazzo	Singer
5		Sirya Luongo	Busker
6	Top 6	Federico Soldati'	Magician
7	Runner-up	Eugenio Amato	Singer
8	Top 6	Igor and Andrea Matyuschenko	Acrobats
9		Emanuele and Leonardo D'Angelo	Tap dance
10		Teatrallegria	Actors
11	Top 6	Pierangelo Gullo	Singer, comedian
12		Luigi Fiorentini	Artist
13		I Verba Volant	Improvisational theatre
14		Luigi Necci	Singer
15	Winner	Stefano Scarpa	Acro pole flag man
16		Terenzio Traisci	Comedian

=== Ratings ===
Show	Date	Viewers	Share
Auditions 1	7 January	5,264,000	22.91%
Auditions 2	14 January	5,764,000	25.47%
Auditions 3	21 January	6,259,000	26.59%
Auditions 4	28 January	6,796,000	28.26%
Auditions 5	4 February	8,059,000	31.97%
Auditions 6	11 February	8,812,000	34.31%
Semi-final 1	25 February	5,717,000	25.89%
Semi-final 2	3 March	6,461,000	28.34%
Final	10 March	6,949,000	30.57%
	Average	6,667,000	28.21%

== Season 4 (2013) ==
=== Final ===
Order	Finished	Artist	Act
1		Daniele and Alessandro Suez	Dancers, acrobats
2	Top 8	Leonardo Fiaschi	Impersonator and Singer
3	Top 8	Sara Venerucci and Danilo Decembrini	Skater
4		Jean Pierre Bianco	Busker
5	Top 8	Alex Barbero	BMX freestyler
6	Winner	Daniel Adomako	Singer
7	Runner-up	Fratelli Lo Tumolo	Comedians, singers
8		Drum's Theatre	Drummers
9	3rd place	Roberto Carlisi	Dancer
10		Walter Orfei Nones Malachikhine	Equilibrist
11		Rossella Regina	Singer
12		Faces of Disco	Dancers
13	Top 8	Ripalta Bufo	Soprano
14		I Gemelli Siamesi	Cabaret
15		Daniele Doria	Parkour
16	Top 8	Los Hermanos Macana	Tango Dancers

=== Ratings ===
Show	Date	Viewers	Share
Auditions 1	12 January	7,253,000	30.93%
Auditions 2	19 January	6,476,000	28.01%
Auditions 3	26 January	6,996,000	30.02%
Auditions 4	2 February	8,044,000	32.34%
Auditions 5	9 February	7,634,000	30.81%
Auditions 6	23 February	8,096,000	32.19%
Semi-final 1	2 March	6,621,000	29.19%
Semi-final 2	9 March	6,725,000	30.33%
Final	16 March	6,926,000	30.00%
	Average	7,196,000	30.42%
