= Maria De Filippi =

Italian presenter (born 1961)

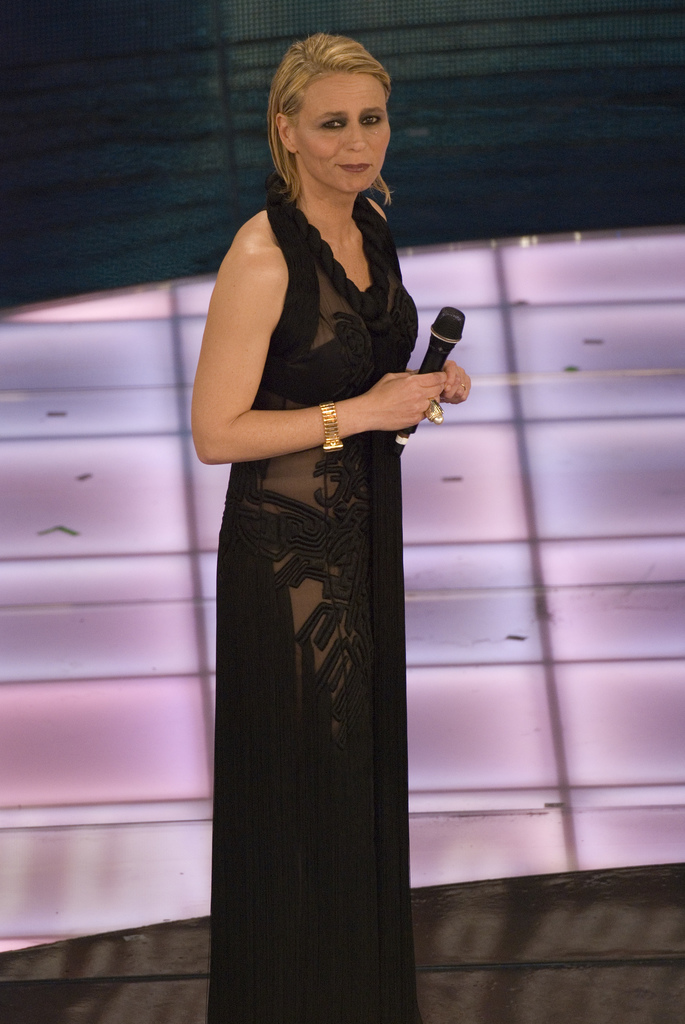
- De Filippi at Sanremo 2009
- Born: 5 December 1961 (age 64); Milan, Italy
- Occupations: Media executive; television presenter; executive producer; author; businesswoman
- Years active: 1992–present
- Known for: Uomini e Donne; C'è posta per te; Amici di Maria De Filippi
- Spouse: Maurizio Costanzo (m. 1995; died 2023)

Maria De Filippi (born 5 December 1961) is an Italian media executive, television presenter, executive producer, author and the owner of the television production company Fascino PGT. She is regarded as one of the most popular presenters in Italy.

== Biography ==
De Filippi was born on 5 December 1961 in Milan, in the Italian region of Lombardy, but grew up in Pavia, Lombardy, where her family moved when she was ten years old. She was married to talk show host Maurizio Costanzo until his death in 2023, and has an adopted son.

== Career ==
De Filippi has hosted numerous shows (mostly talent shows and reality TV) broadcast by Mediaset's Canale 5, such as Uomini e donne and C'è posta per te. Since 2001 she has been a host and producer on the Canale 5 talent show Amici di Maria De Filippi, which was originally titled Saranno famosi. Similarly to the American series Fame, it features a school of young aspiring singers and dancers. The artists are divided up in teams, and compete against each other, performing before a live audience and a panel of judges and instructors. Albanian-born dancer Kledi Kadiu was a regular performer on the programme.

In 2001, De Filippi hosted the Telegatto with Gerry Scotti. Since 2009, she has also been one of Italia's Got Talent's judges and producers. Marco Carta, Valerio Scanu, and Emma Marrone participated in the programme Amici, which launched their singing careers. All three of them went on to win first place in the prestigious Sanremo Music Festival in 2009, 2010, and 2012, respectively.

The TV shows supported by De Filippi and Fascino PGT's productions include Amici, Uomini e donne, C'è posta per te, Italia's Got Talent, Coca-Cola Summer Festival, Temptation Island, Tú sí que vales, Pequeños gigantes, Maurizio Costanzo Show, L'intervista, Selfie – Le cose cambiano, House Party and Ultima fermata.

== Filmography ==
| Year | Title | Role | Notes |
|---|---|---|---|
| 2002 | Christmas on the Nile | Herself | Feature film; cameo appearance |
| 2008 | I Cesaroni | Herself | TV Series; episode: "La posta del cuore" |
| 2011 | Finalmente la felicità | Herself | Feature film; cameo appearance |
| 2023 | Vita da Carlo | Herself | TV Series; episode: "Fuga da Fregene" |

== Television programmes ==
| Title | Year | Role | Notes |
|---|---|---|---|
| Amici | 1992–2001 | Presenter | Talk show, presenter from season 2 |
| Amici di sera | 1993–1997 | Presenter | Night version of the talk show Amici |
| Forum | 1995–1996 | Regular guest | Debate procedural program (season 11) |
| Uomini e donne | 1996–present | Presenter | Dating reality show; also creator |
| Buona Domenica | 1997–1998 | Guest | Variety show (season 10) |
| Missione impossibile | 1998 | Presenter | Reality show; also creator |
| Telegatto 2001 | 2001 | Presenter | Annual ceremony |
| Amici di Maria De Filippi | 2001–present | Presenter | Singing and dancing talent show, originally titled Saranno Famosi for its first season |
| Vero Amore | 2005 | Presenter | Reality show (season 1), retitled for season 2 as Temptation Island |
| Striscia la notizia | 2005, 2015 | Guest host | Variety show (season 17 and season 28) |
| Unan1mous | 2006 | Presenter | Reality show; Italian version of the American program Unan1mous |
| Sanremo Music Festival 2009 | 2009 | Co-host | Annual music festival |
| Italia's Got Talent | 2009–2013 | Judge | Talent show (seasons 1–5) |
| Tú sí que vales | 2014–present | Judge | Talent show; also creator |
| House Party | 2016 | Presenter | Variety show (episode 1) with Sabrina Ferilli |
| Rischiatutto | 2016 | Guest | Game show; contestant for one episode |
| Amici Celebrities | 2019 | Presenter | Celebrity version of Amici di Maria De Filippi |
| Amici Specials | 2021 | Presenter | Amazon Prime Video original web show |

== Awards ==
- 1995 – Telegatto Intrattenimento con ospiti for Amici
- 1996 – Telegatto Intrattenimento con ospiti for Amici di sera
- 1997 – Telegatto Personaggio femminile dell'anno
- 1998 – Telegatto Intrattenimento con ospiti for Accadde domani
- 2000 – Telegatto Miglior talk show for C'è posta per te
- 2001 – Telegatto Miglior talk show for C'è posta per te
- 2002 – Telegatto Miglior reality show for Saranno famosi
- 2002 – Telegatto Trasmissione dell'anno for Saranno famosi
- 2003 – Telegatto Miglior reality show for Amici di Maria De Filippi
- 2003 – Telegatto Personaggio femminile dell'anno
- 2008 – Telegatto TeleRatto Speciale di Amianto for Amici di Maria De Filippi
- 2011 – Wind Music Award Premio Speciale "Arena di Verona"
- 2021 – Seat Music Award Premio Speciale
