= Valle Giulia =

Valley near Rome

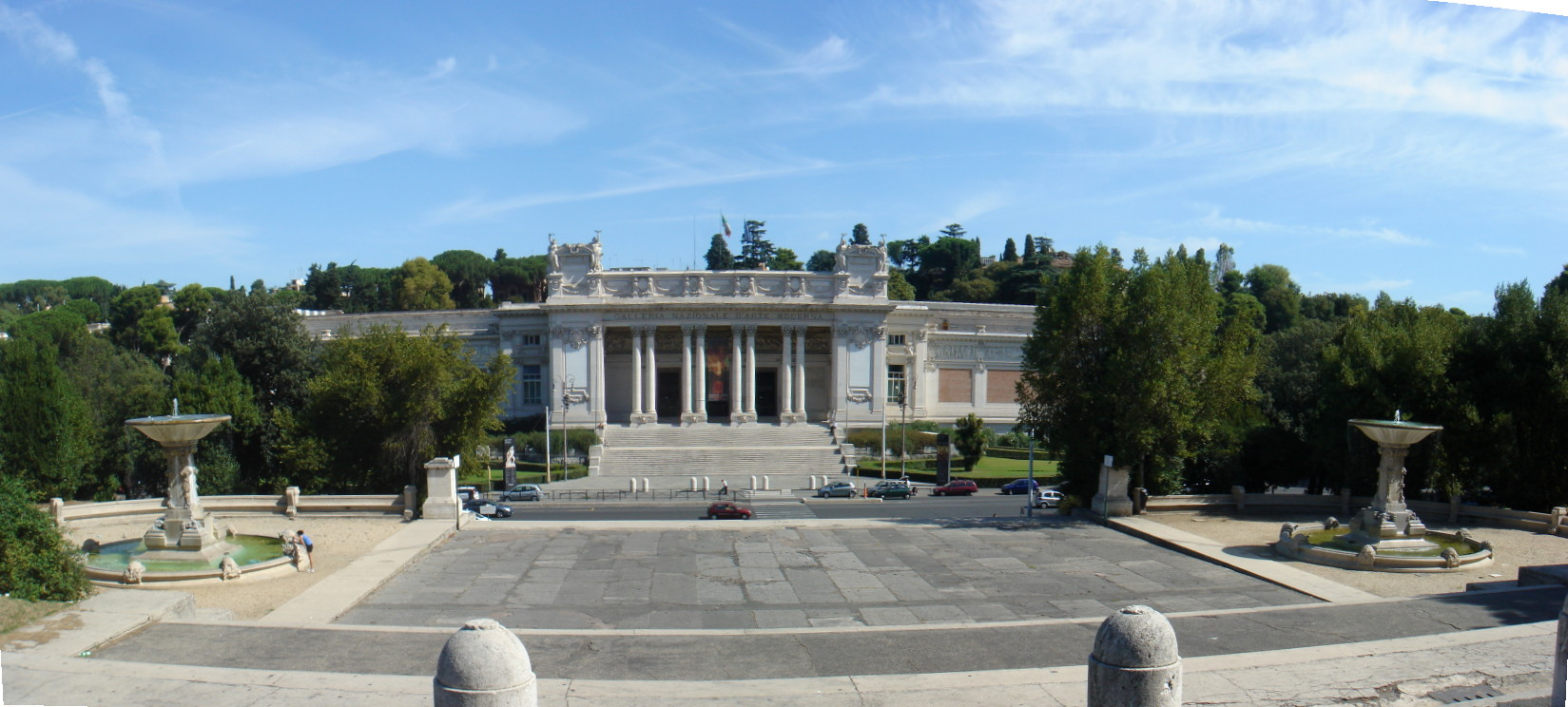
Galleria Nazionale d'Arte Moderna in Valle Giulia

Valle Giulia is a central area of Rome, located between Villa Borghese and Parioli. It takes its name from the Renaissance Villa Giulia, named after Pope Julius III and designed by the architect Giacomo Barozzi da Vignola.

The current layout of the district largely stems from the development undertaken for the 1911 International Exhibition of Art. The area, known as Vigna Cartoni until then, had previously been rural, home to several country villas of prominent Roman families (Villa Giulia, Villa Borghese, Villa Strohl Fern, Villa Poniatowski, Villa Balestra and Villa e Casina Vagnuzzi). In preparation for the event, a team of architects led by Cesare Bazzani drastically modified the entire area, giving it a public function and creating a road system where there had previously been none.

French poster by Georges Rochegrosse advertising the Exposition Internationale Rome, 1911

The main legacy of the exhibition was the development of Valle Giulia into museum district; it includes the Palazzo delle Belle Arti, designed for the fair by Cesare Bazzani – which, since 1915, has housed the Galleria Nazionale d'Arte Moderna – , the National Etruscan Museum, and the British School at Rome (originally the English Pavilion, designed by Sir Edwin Lutyens). In the following years, the area became home to numerous foreign research institutes, including the Academia Belgica, and the Romanian Academy in Rome. On the slopes of the hill overlooking the valley lies Italy’s first faculty of architecture, which was established by the Sapienza University of Rome in 1920 and still exists today.

== Legacy ==
The first movement of Ottorino Respighi's Fountains of Rome is titled La fontana di Valle Giulia all'Alba. On 1 March 1968, the area surrounding the Faculty of Architecture in Valle Giulia became the scene of intense clashes between students and law enforcement – an event that became known as the Battle of Valle Giulia and is remembered as one of the most significant moments of the 1968 movement in Italy. The violence resulted in injuries to 148 police officers and 47 students, along with numerous arrests and significant property damage. The battle inspired Pier Paolo Pasolini's famous poem "Il PCI ai giovani!" ("The PCI to the Young!"), in which he controversially sympathized with the police officers, viewing them as the true children of the poor, unlike the bourgeois student protestors.

== See also ==
- Villa Giulia
- Battle of Valle Giulia
- Fountain of Valle Giulia

== Bibliography ==
- Dal Falco, Federica (2023). "Valle Giulia, the Valley of the Academies. From the International Exhibition of 1911 to the New Cultural and Academic Complex". In Charles Bossu; Sabine van Sprang (eds.). The Academia Belgica in Rome: Building for the Arts & Sciences in the Eternal City. Bruxelles: Mercatorfonds. pp. 31–40. ISBN 978-94-6230-364-5.
