= TIM Music Awards =

Annual Italian music awards ceremony

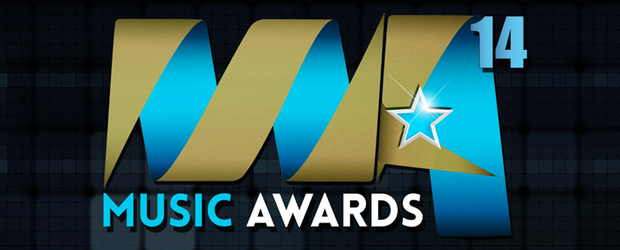
- Logo of the 2014 edition
- Awarded for: Outstanding achievements in the Italian music business
- Sponsored by: Wind (2007–2013; 2015–2018); SEAT (2019–2021); TIM (2022–present)
- Country: Italy
- Presented by: FIMI, AFI, PIM; Hosts: see below
- Formerly called: Wind Music Awards (2007–2013; 2015–2018); Music Awards (2014); SEAT Music Awards (2019–2021)
- First award: 2007

Television/radio coverage
- Network: Italia 1 (2007–2011); Rai 1 (2012–present)
- Produced by: Ballandi Multimedia, FMP Group
- Directed by: Cristian Biondani, Maurizio Pagnussat (2012–present)

The TIM Music Awards, known between 2007–2013 and 2015–2018 as Wind Music Awards, in 2014 as simply Music Awards, and between 2019 and 2021 as SEAT Music Awards, are non-competitive music awards honoring Italian music artists who have sold a certain number of copies of an album, digital song, or music DVD over the previous year in Italy, as certified by the Federazione Industria Musicale Italiana. The awards are organized by Milan-based agency Friends & Partners, and held since 2007 as a replacement of the canceled Italian Music Awards (2001–2003).

Their previous name was dependent on the sponsorship of Italian phone company Wind. In 2014 they were officially known as just Music Awards while between 2019 and 2021 they have been sponsored by SEAT. From 2022 it is sponsored by TIM.

== History ==
From 2007 to 2009, the awards were held in Rome, first in the Auditorium Conciliazione and then in the Valle Giulia. Since 2009, the event has been held in the Arena di Verona, previously home to the Festivalbar, for which the Wind Music Awards has been seen as a replacement. The first five years of the awards were broadcast on television network Italia 1; they have been broadcast on Rai 1 since 2012. The event has also been broadcast on radio station RTL 102.5.

The awards have been criticized in the past by Italian indie label Produttori Musicali Indipendenti for excluding independent artists.

== Awards ==
Based on:

	Diamond	Multi-platinum	Platinum	Gold
Album (copies)	300,000	120,000	60,000	30,000
Digital song (downloads)		60,000	30,000	
Music DVD (copies)			30,000	

== Years ==
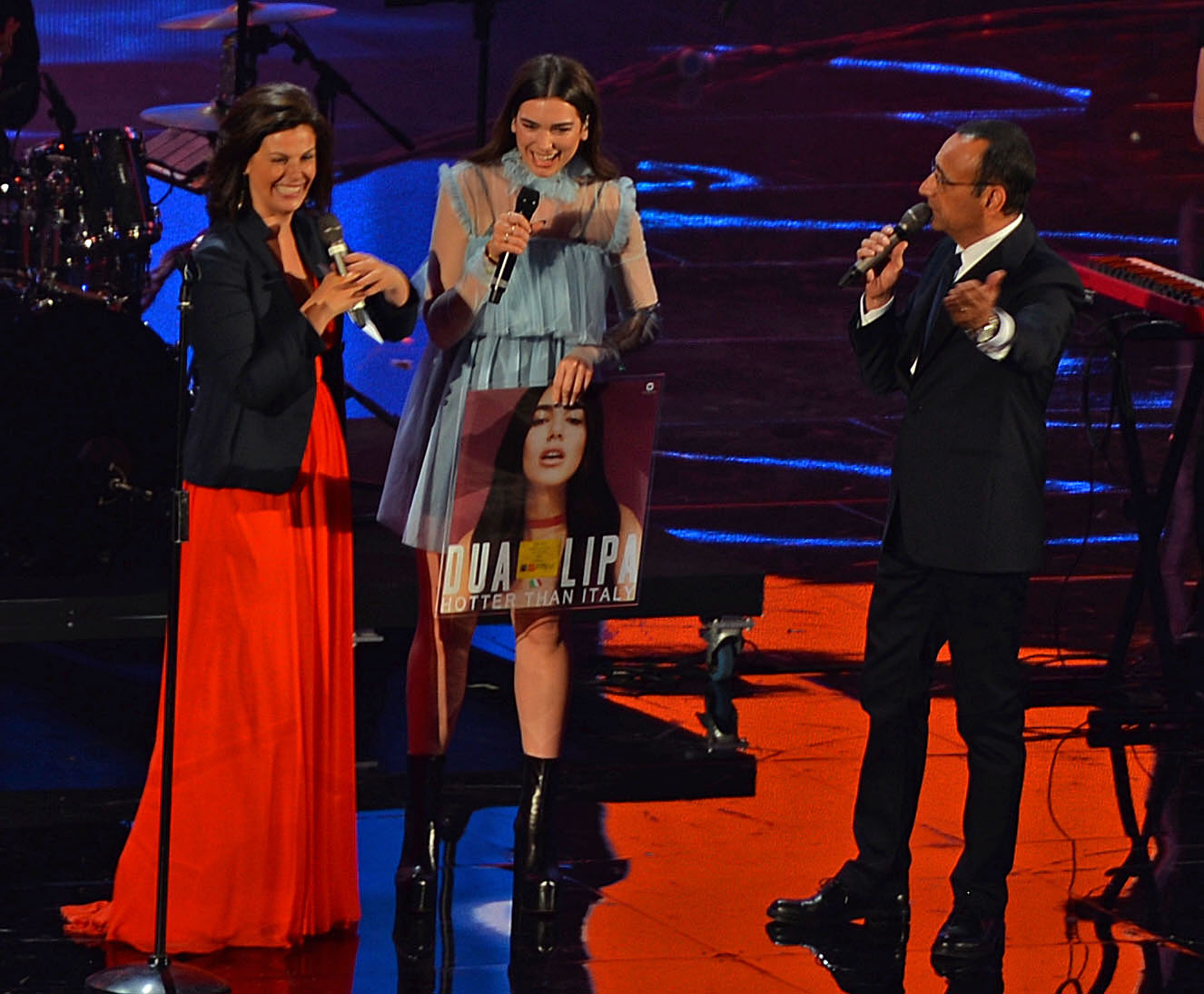
Hosts Vanessa Incontrada and Carlo Conti with Dua Lipa (middle) at the Wind Music Awards in Arena di Verona, 2016

Year	Recorded date	Air date(s)	Network	Episodes	Host(s)	Venue
2007	6 June 2007	14 June 2007	Italia 1	1	Cristina Chiabotto	Auditorium Conciliazione (Rome)
2008	3 June 2008	4–5 June 2008	Italia 1	2	Cristina Chiabotto; Rossella Brescia	Valle Giulia (Rome)
2009	6–7 June 2009	8–22 June 2009	Italia 1	3	Vanessa Incontrada	Verona Arena
2010	28–29 May 2010	2, 9, 16 June 2010	Italia 1	3	Paola Perego	Verona Arena
2011	27–28 May 2011	7, 14, 21 June 2011	Italia 1	3	Vanessa Incontrada; Teo Mammucari	Verona Arena
2012	26 May 2012	2 July 2012	Rai 1	1	Carlo Conti; Vanessa Incontrada	Verona Arena
2013	LIVE	2 June 2013	Rai 1 Rai HD	1	Carlo Conti; Vanessa Incontrada	Foro Italico (Rome)

== Compilation albums ==
Title	CDs	Tracks	Label	Release date
Wind Music Awards 2011	3	54	Sony Music	31 May 2011
Wind Music Awards 2012	2	35	Sony Music	22 June 2012
