= Fountain of Valle Giulia =

Fountain in Rome, Italy

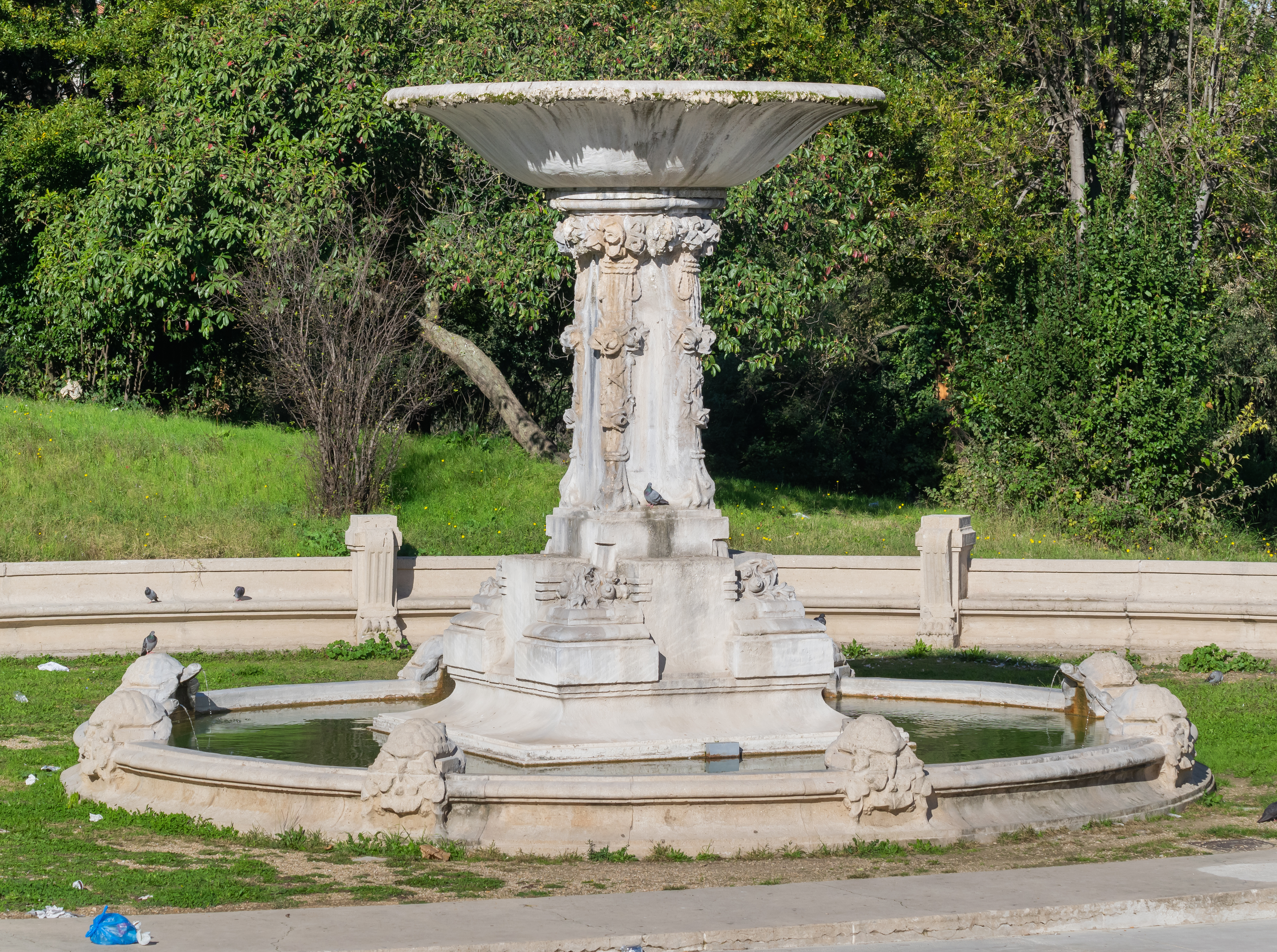

The Fountain of Valle Giulia is a fountain in the Valle Giulia area of Rome.

The rim of the basin is decorated with turtles (not to be confused with the Turtle Fountain in Piazza Mattei). In 2004, restoration work was carried out on the fountains and the surrounding exedras.

It is part of the Scalea Bruno Zevi, designed by Cesare Bazzani for the International Exhibition of Art in 1911, which connects the Galleria Nazionale d'Arte Moderna (to the north) with the Villa Borghese gardens (to the south).

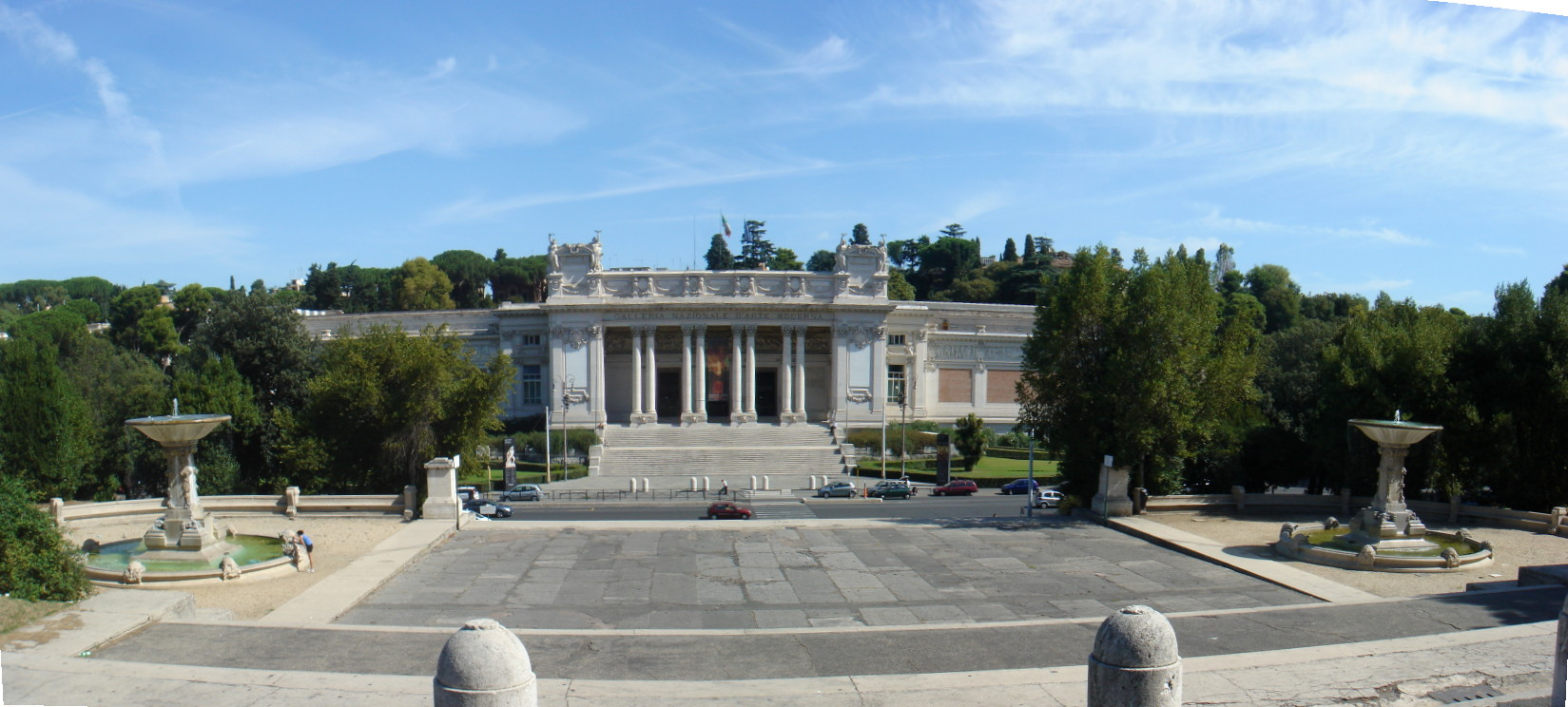
A view of the fountains in the foreground, with the steps and the Galleria Nazionale d'Arte Moderna in the background.

Directly to the south of the fountains, at the entrance to the Villa Borghese, are the Valle Giulia gardens, also designed by Bazzani, which frame the Piazzale Ferdowsi (Ferdowsi Square). Here there are monuments to literary figures including Ferdowsi, Nizami Ganjavi, Ahmed Shawqi, and Henryk Sienkiewicz. It was immortalised in the symphonic poem Fontane di Roma by Ottorino Respighi.

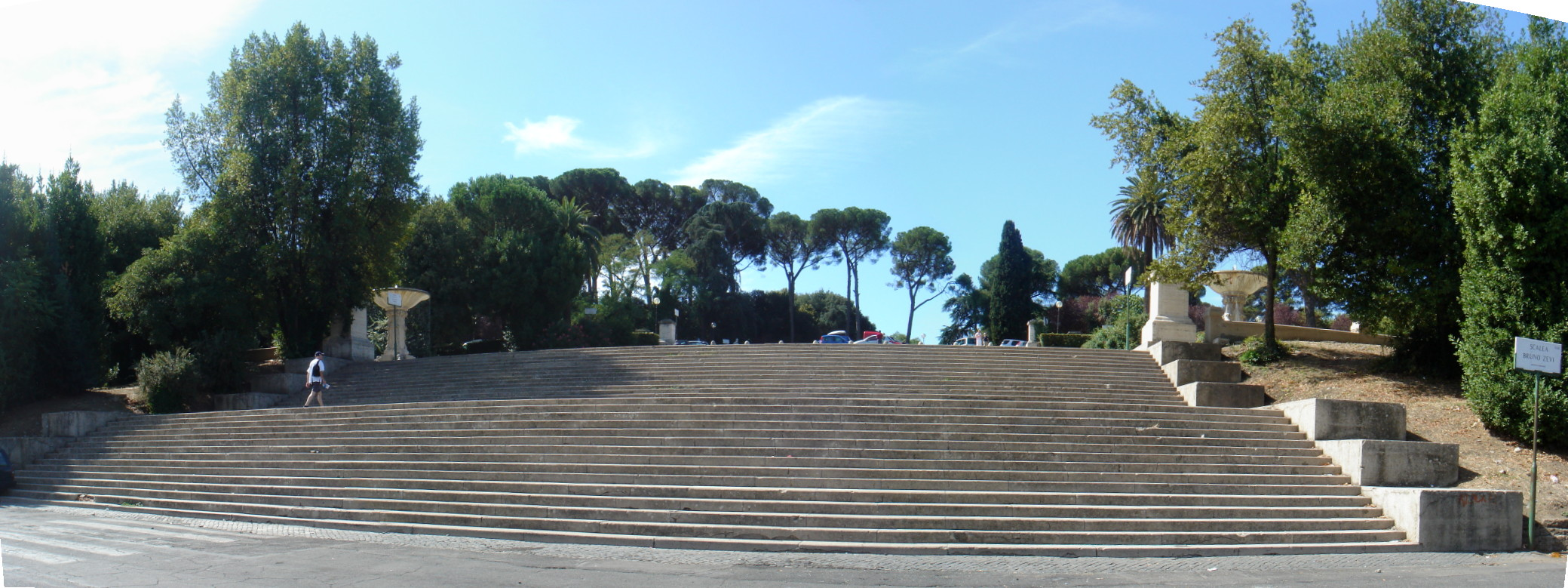
A view up the steps of the Scalea Bruno Zevi, in front of the Galleria Nazionale d'Arte Moderna and adjacent to the Valle Giulia. The fountain is at the top of the steps.
