= Il sangue dei leoni =

Italian book

Blood of the Lions
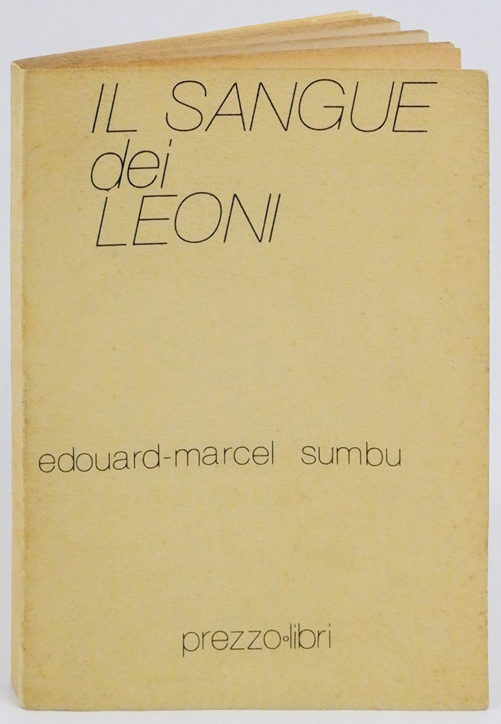
- Cover of the first Italian edition, 1965, Prezzo Libri.
- Author: Edouard-Marcel Sumbu
- Original title: Il sangue dei leoni
- Language: Italian
- Subject: Politics; Unconventional warfare
- Publication date: 1965

Blood of the Lions (Italian: Il sangue dei leoni) is a 263-page book published in 1965 by Prezzo Libri and republished in 1969 by Feltrinelli.

== History and contents ==
The book contributed to the training of violent non-state actors in Italy during the "Sessantotto" and the Years of Lead, and also abroad, such as in the case of the Italian Red Brigades and the Palestinian Fatah.

On 1 October 1978, men from a special unit led by General Carlo Alberto Dalla Chiesa raided a Milanese apartment on Via Monte Nevoso, used as a hideout by the Red Brigades, finding, along with other books and documents, a copy of Blood of the Lions. Blood of the Lions was also one of the books in the personal library of Valerio Verbano, a young militant of Autonomia Operaia who was assassinated by a neo-fascist commando on February 22, 1980.

The work is composed of two political writings by Edouard-Marcel Sumbu, a former Congolese rebel exiled in Cuba – "A Call from the Fighters to All the Congolese People for a Mass Revolt Against the Kinshasa Reaction" and "Speech at the Cultural Congress of Havana: Culture and National Independence" – and the Italian translation of a special text or military manual written for the United States Army Special Forces, titled ST 31-180 Special Forces Handbook, which summarizes various tactics and techniques of unconventional warfare, guerrilla warfare, sabotage, and artisanal production of various types of explosive and incendiary devices.

According to an article published in the South African magazine Chimurenga, and republished by the Italian magazine Internazionale:

The publication of Il sangue dei leoni (Blood of the Lions), the most popular book ever published by the Italian leftist publisher Giangiacomo Feltrinelli, is a good example of the intricate machinery of global circulation at the end of the 1960s. Originally written in French by a former Congolese rebel exiled in Cuba, and then translated into Italian for its publication by Feltrinelli, Il sangue dei Leoni is a narrative of the armed struggle in eastern Congo, and as such it was part of the effort to establish the relevance of the conflict and gather international support for the Congolese revolution. Edouard-Marcel Sumbu’s text did not constitute the entirety of the book. It was followed by a very long document, presented as the manual of the US army’s special forces, used for the secret training of counter-insurrection commandos at Fort Bragg in North Carolina. It is not very clear how the manual reached Feltrinelli or if it was part of Sumbu’s original manuscript, but Il sangue dei leoni remains a milestone in the history of the acceleration of the cycles of violence in the Italian Sessantotto and beyond. The reason for the success of the book was its very practical and detailed explanations of the organisation of guerrillas, which even included a whole section on the making of bombs. Reportedly, Il sangue dei leoni ended up on the bedside table of every Red Brigade member. Furthermore, some sources indicate that Israeli forces found copies of its Arabic translation on the dead bodies of Palestinian Al Fatah fighters in 1970 – a surprising testimony to the far-reaching repercussions of the intellectual labour of the young Congolese who advertised the post-Lumumbist revolution to the world in the global 1960s.

— How Third World Students Liberated the West, Chimurenga

== Structure ==
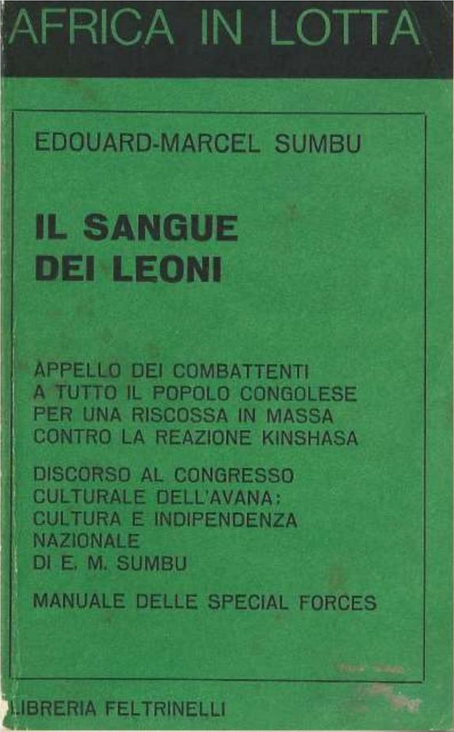
Il sangue dei leoni (cover of the second Italian edition, 1969, Libreria Feltrinelli).

The structure of Blood of the Lions is organized according to the following table of contents:

- Blood of the Lions by Edouard-Marcel Sumbu. The "Simba." – The causes of the armed insurrection. – The Congo. But also Africa. – Recourse to armed struggle. – From Kuilu to eastern Congo. – The revolutionary flame blazes in eastern Congo. – Simba is invulnerable. – Towards Stanleyville (Page 5)
- Message to the People of the Congo (p. 55)
- Culture and National Independence (Havana Cultural Congress). Delegate: Edouard-Marcel Sumbu (p. 71)
- Special Forces Manual (January 1965) (p. 78)
- Chapter One. General Informations (p. 83)
- Chapter Two. Tactics (p. 84)
- Chapter Three. Demolitions (p. 97)
- Chapter Four. Air Operations (p. 143)
- Chapter Five. Armaments (p. 182)
- Chapter Six. Communications (p. 208)
- Chapter Seven. First Aid (p. 225)
- Chapter Nine (p. 254)

== Editions ==
- Sumbu, Edouard-Marcel (1965). Il sangue dei leoni [Blood of the Lions] (in Italian). Padova: Prezzo libri.
- Sumbu, Edouard-Marcel (1969). Il sangue dei leoni : Appello dei combattenti a tutto il popolo congolese per una riscossa in massa contro la reazione Kinshasa, Discorso al Congresso culturale dell'Avana: Cultura e indipendenza nazionale di E. M. Sumbu, Manuale delle Special Forces [Blood of the Lions : A Call from the Fighters to All the Congolese People for a Mass Revolt Against the Kinshasa Reaction, Speech at the Cultural Congress of Havana: Culture and National Independence by E. M. Sumbu, Special Forces Manual]. Africa in lotta (in Italian). Translated by De Luigi Rotondi, Maria Luisa; Orsini, Milly; Petrillo, Raffaele. Milano: Libreria Feltrinelli. BNI: 705926.

== See also ==
- 1968 movement in Italy
- Aldo Moro
- Autonomia Operaia
- Carlo Alberto Dalla Chiesa
- Feltrinelli
- Guerrilla warfare
- Red Brigades
- Unconventional warfare
- United States Army Special Forces
- Years of Lead

== Bibliography ==
- Armati, Cristiano, ed. (2009). Il libretto rosso dei partigiani. Manuale di resistenza, sabotaggio e guerriglia antifascista [The Little Red Book of the Partisans. A Manual of Resistance, Sabotage, and Anti-Fascist Guerrilla Warfare] (in Italian). preface by Ferruccio Parri. Purple Press. ISBN 978-8895903200.
- Gotor, Miguel (2011). Il memoriale della Repubblica. Gli scritti di Aldo Moro dalla prigionia e l'anatomia del potere italiano [The Memorial of the Republic. Aldo Moro's Writings from Imprisonment and the Anatomy of Italian Power] (in Italian). Torino: Einaudi. ISBN 978-8806200398.
- Jian, Chen; Waley-Cohen, Joanna; Young, Marilyn; Klimke, Martin; Nolan, Mary; Kirasirova, Masha, eds. (2018). The Routledge Handbook of the Global Sixties: Between Protest and Nation-Building. Taylor & Francis. ISBN 9781351366106.
- Martin Alvarez, Alberto; Rey Tristán, Eduardo, eds. (2016). Revolutionary Violence and the New Left: Transnational Perspectives. Taylor & Francis. ISBN 978-1317291374.
- Monaville, Pedro (2022). Students of the World: Global 1968 and Decolonization in the Congo. Duke University Press. ISBN 978-1478022985.
- ST 31-180 Special Forces Handbook. U.S. Army J.F.K. Special Warfare Center. January 1965.
