= Death and Life =

Painting by Gustav Klimt

- Tod und Leben (German)
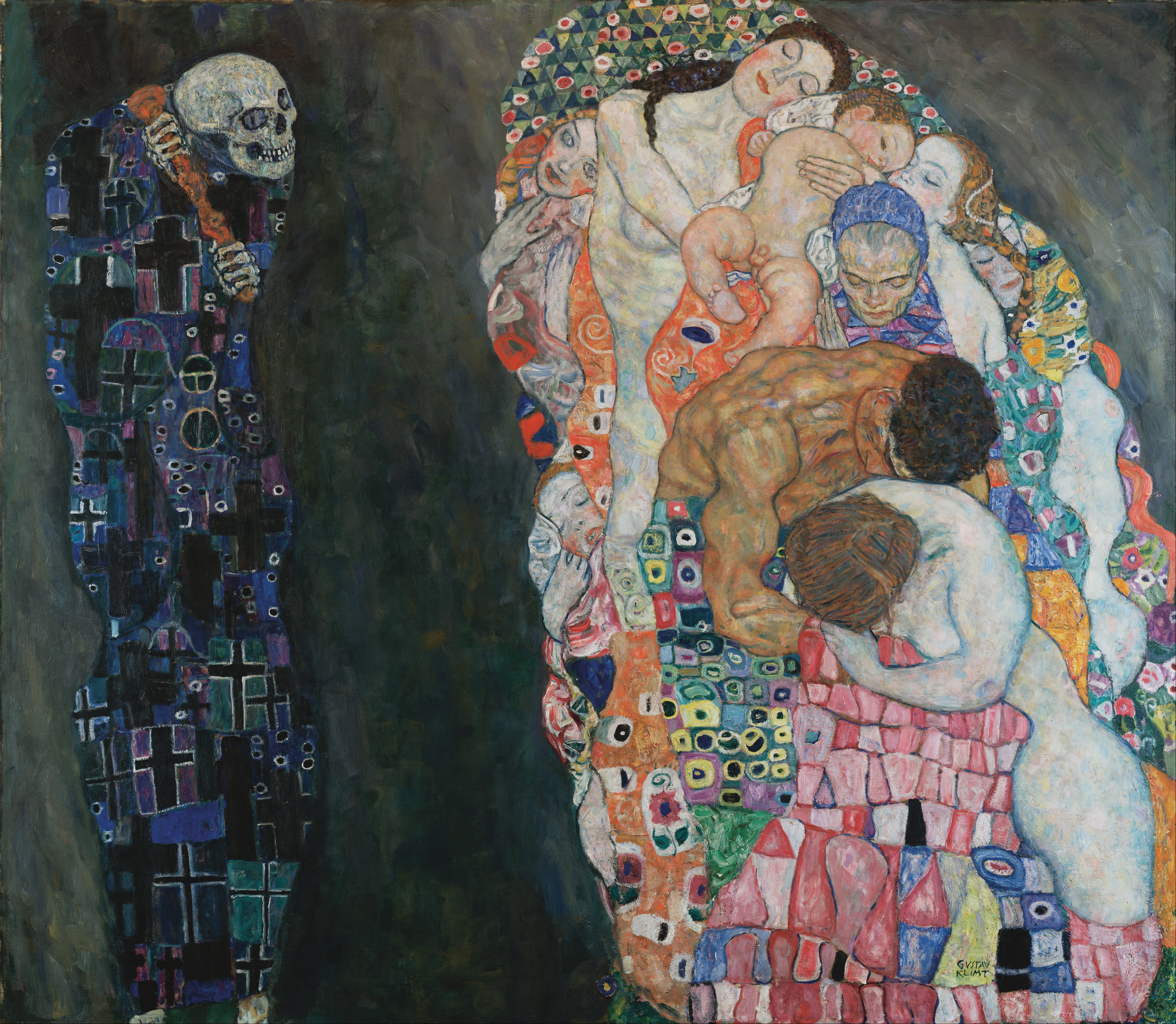
- Artist: Gustav Klimt
- Year: 1910/11, reworked in 1912/13 and 1915/16
- Medium: Oil on canvas
- Movement: Symbolism, Art Nouveau
- Dimensions: 180.8 cm × 200.6 cm (71.2 in × 79.0 in)
- Location: Leopold Museum, Vienna

Death and Life (German: Tod und Leben) is an oil-on-canvas painting by Austrian painter Gustav Klimt. The painting was started in 1908 and completed in 1915. It depicts an allegorical subject in Art Nouveau style. The painting is now housed at the Leopold Museum in Vienna.

== Description ==
The relationship of death and life is one of Klimt's central themes, central also to his time and to his contemporaries, among them Edvard Munch and Egon Schiele.

Themes of the artwork include the expectations preceding physical unions, serenity, aging, closeness of death, and youth.

== 1915 alteration ==
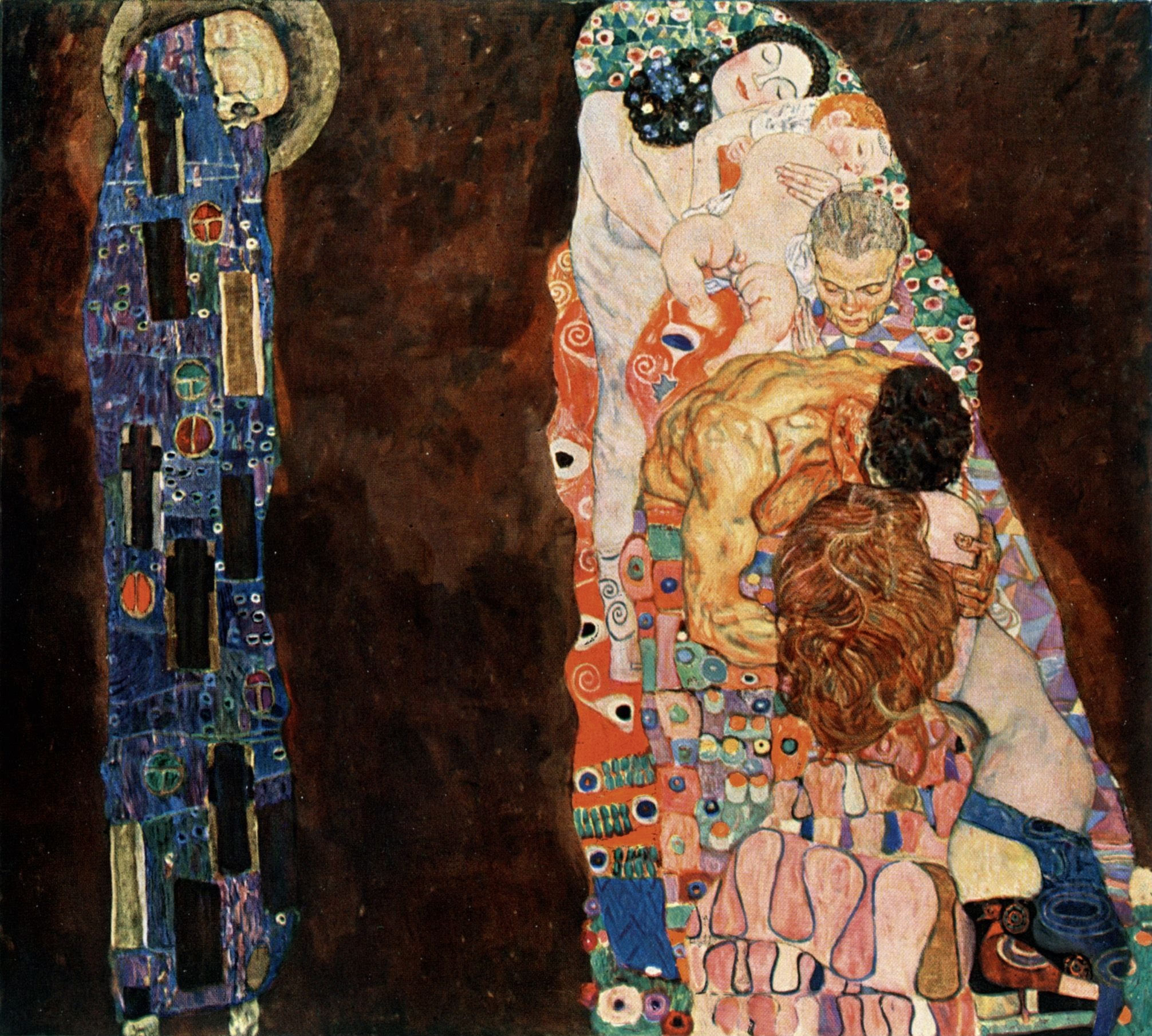
Death and Life (First Version); 1910–11, oil on canvas, 2,005 mm × 1,805 mm, Leopold Museum

Klimt made changes to the painting in 1915, after the first five exhibitions of the painting. He changed the background colour from golden to grey, and added some mosaics.

== Exhibition history ==
In 1911 Death and Life received first prize in the world exhibitions in Rome. In 1912 Klimt exhibited the painting at an art exhibition in Dresden.

Further exhibitions of the painting took place e.g. 1913 in Budapest and Mannheim, 1914 in Prague, 1916 in Berlin, 1917 in Stockholm, 1917/'18 in Copenhagen, 1918 in Zurich and from 1923 several times in Vienna, 1958 in Venice, and 1965 in New York and London.

== See also ==
- List of paintings by Gustav Klimt
