= Battle of Valle Giulia =

1968 clash during Italy's Years of Lead

- Part of the 1968 movement in Italy and the Years of Lead
Date	1 March 1968
Location	University "La Sapienza", Rome, Italy
Result	Italian Police victory: The militants fail to capture the Sapienza University of Rome

Belligerents
Far-right militants	Far-left militants	/ Italian Police Forces

Commanders and leaders
Stefano Delle Chiaie	Unknown	Unknown

Strength
Around 4,000 students	1,000 policemen	

Casualties and losses
272 arrested 478 wounded	148 wounded	

The Battle of Valle Giulia (battaglia di Valle Giulia) is the conventional name for a clash between Italian militants (left-wing as well as right-wing) and the Italian police in Valle Giulia, Rome, on 1 March 1968. It is still frequently remembered as one of the first violent clashes in Italy's student unrest during the protests of 1968 or "Sessantotto".

== Overview ==
On Friday 1 March, about 4,000 people gathered in the Piazza di Spagna, who began marching through the Sapienza University of Rome campus; some had the intention of occupying the school. When they arrived, the students found themselves in front of an imposing cordon of police, and during the coping that followed, a small group of policemen broke away to deal with violence of an isolated student; the protesters responded with throwing stones and blunt objects. The leaders of the attacks against police were neo-fascist members of the National Vanguard Youth. Left-wing and right-wing students occupied different buildings. In the brawl, 148 injuries were recorded to police, 478 injuries to students, 4 were detained, and 228 were arrested. Eight police cars were destroyed, and five guns were stolen from officers.

== See also ==
- Autonomism
- Hot Autumn
