= 1968 movement in Italy =

Protest movement

- Part of Protests of 1968 and the Years of Lead
- Date: 1968
- Location: Italy
- Result: Movement suppressed; Hot Autumn

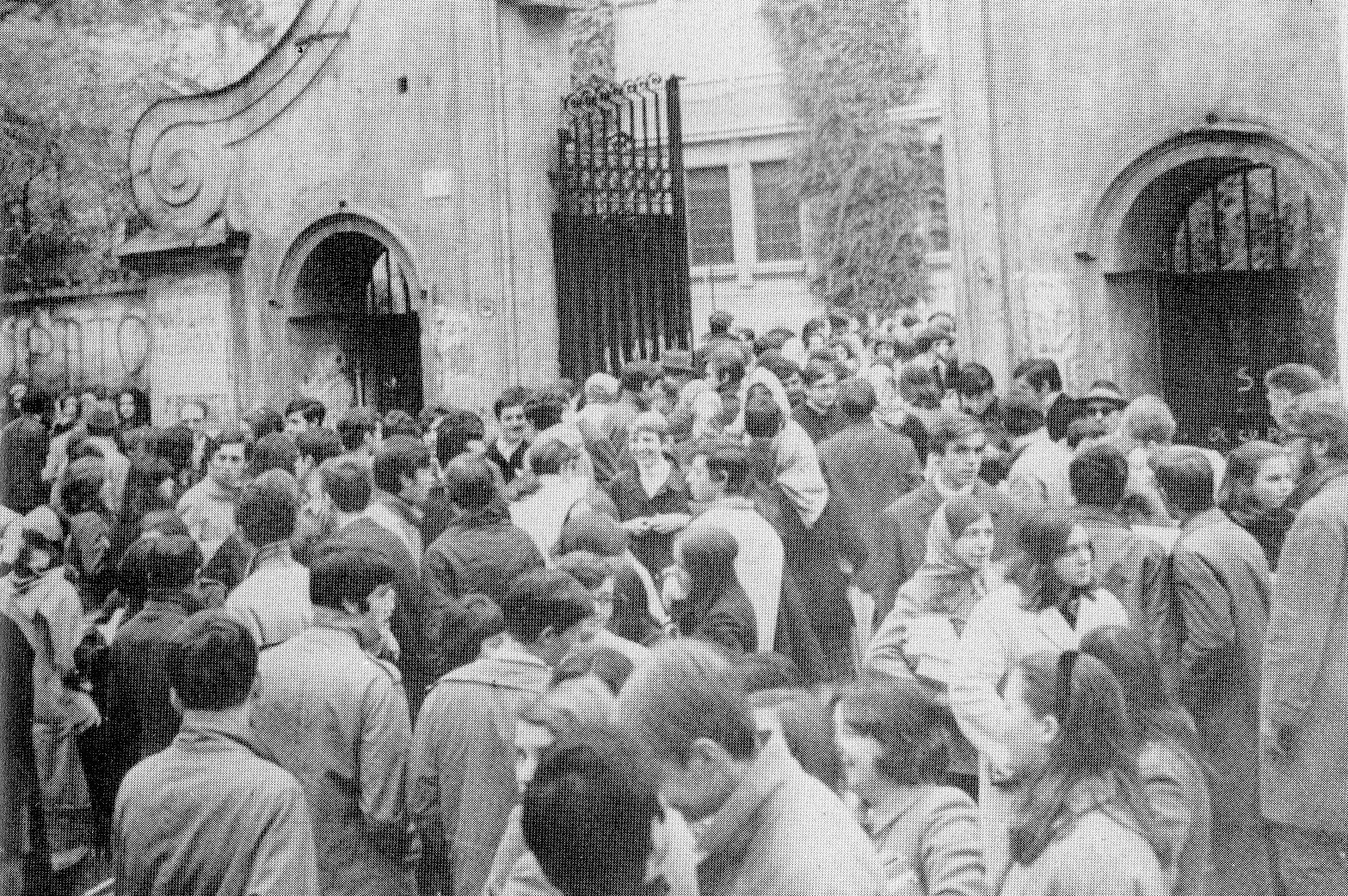
Occupation of the Mamiani High School in Rome. December 1968

The 1968 movement in Italy or Sessantotto was inspired by distaste or discontent with traditional Italian society and by similar international protests. In May 1968 all universities, except Bocconi, were occupied. In the same month a hundred artists, including Giò Pomodoro, Arnaldo Pomodoro, Ernesto Treccani and Gianni Dova occupied the Palazzo della Triennale for 15 days.

== Movement ==
The background of the movement came from the newly transformed economy of Italy. The country had recently increased industrialization and a new modern culture began to develop. The movement has its roots in the strikes and university occupations of the 1960s, along with international headlines about socialist political triumphs in the Cold War.

Students of working or peasant backgrounds mainly drove the movement in an effort to change traditional capitalist and patriarchal society. The new education system allowed for a large populace to be educated and, consequently question existing societal functions. The unrest began with student protests which were initially underestimated by politicians and the press; this soon turned into "the struggle of workers".

In the first moments of the student protest, the right wing in the universities were among the movement's leaders. The Battle of Valle Giulia at Rome University on 1 March 1968 was the last action in which left- and right-wing students were together because, on 16 March following the assault on the University La Sapienza, there was a gap between "movementists" and reactionaries. The left came to dominate the movement and the right-wing debates on what actions should be used to further the movement.

== Aftermath ==
The counter-cultural attitudes of the movement ended up creating conflicts within the Italian Left. The movement did bring a form of solidarity among the youth and a new politicized generation was created. There is debate about when and how a new political generation was formed.

== See also ==
- Hot Autumn
- Il sangue dei leoni
- Red Brigades
- Years of Lead (Italy)
