= Fountains of Rome (symphonic poem) =

Symphonic poem by Ottorino Respighi

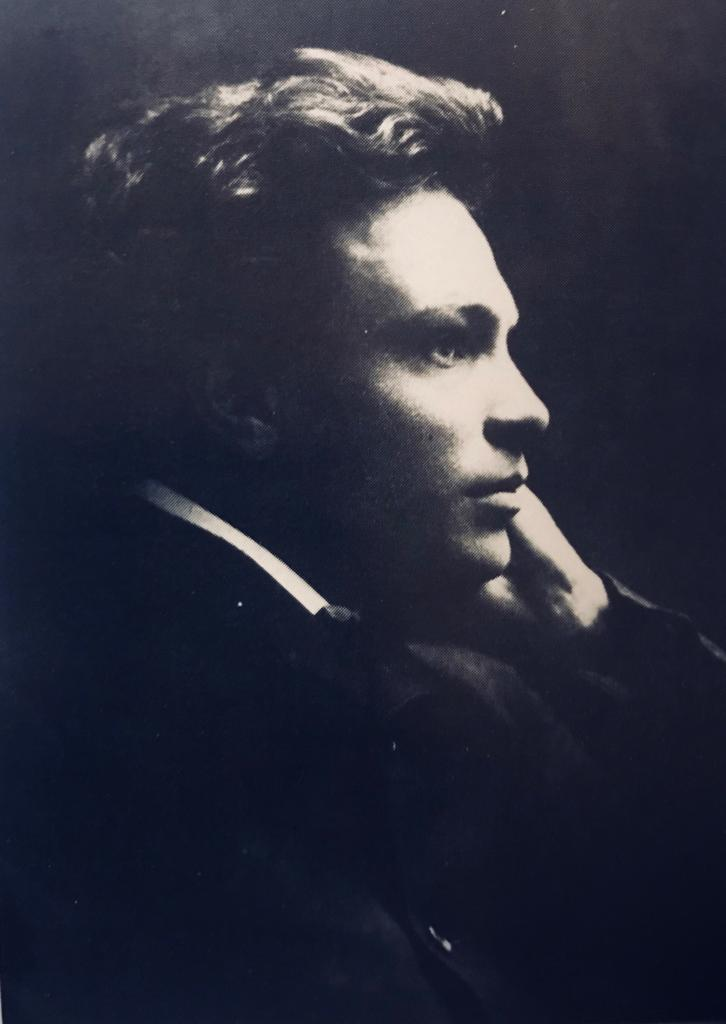
Respighi in 1912

Fountains of Rome (Italian: Fontane di Roma), P 106, is a tone poem in four movements completed in 1916 by the Italian composer Ottorino Respighi. It is the first of his three tone poems about Rome, preceding Pines of Rome (1924) and Roman Festivals (1928). Each movement depicts a setting at one of Rome's fountains at a different time of the day, specifically the Valle Giulia, Triton, Trevi, and Villa Medici. The premiere was held at the Teatro Augusteo on 11 March 1917, with Antonio Guarnieri conducting the Augusteo Orchestra. Respighi was disheartened at its initial mild reception and put away the score, until the piece was re-evaluated by the public following a February 1918 performance by conductor Arturo Toscanini which brought the composer international fame. The piece was published by Casa Ricordi in 1918.

== Structure ==
The work has four movements:

1. "The Fountain of Valle Giulia at Dawn" (La fontana di Valle Giulia all'alba)
2. "The Triton Fountain in the Morning" (La fontana del Tritone al mattino)
3. "The Trevi Fountain at Noon" (La fontana di Trevi al meriggio)
4. "The Villa Medici Fountain at Sunset" (La fontana di Villa Medici al tramonto)

The first movement shows this fountain at daybreak in "a pastoral scene, with sheep passing and disappearing in the fresh and humid mist of a Roman dawn".

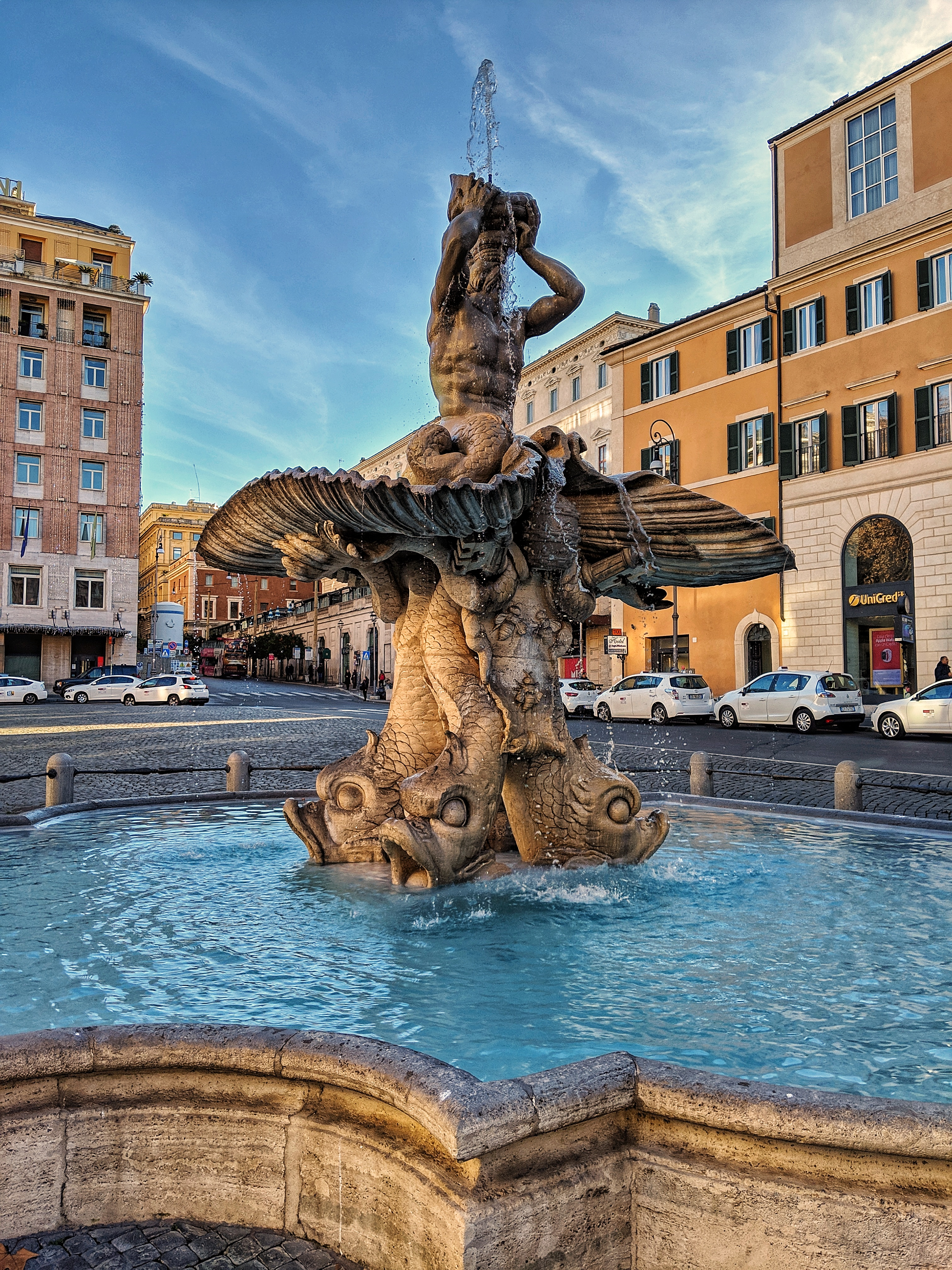
Triton Fountain, Rome

In the second movement, "it is like some joyous appeal at whose sound naiads and Tritons come trooping up, pursuing each other and mingling in a wild dance beneath the falling spray." Figures of the Bernini fountain are seen nearby. The Tritons blow on conch shells, portrayed by the French horns.

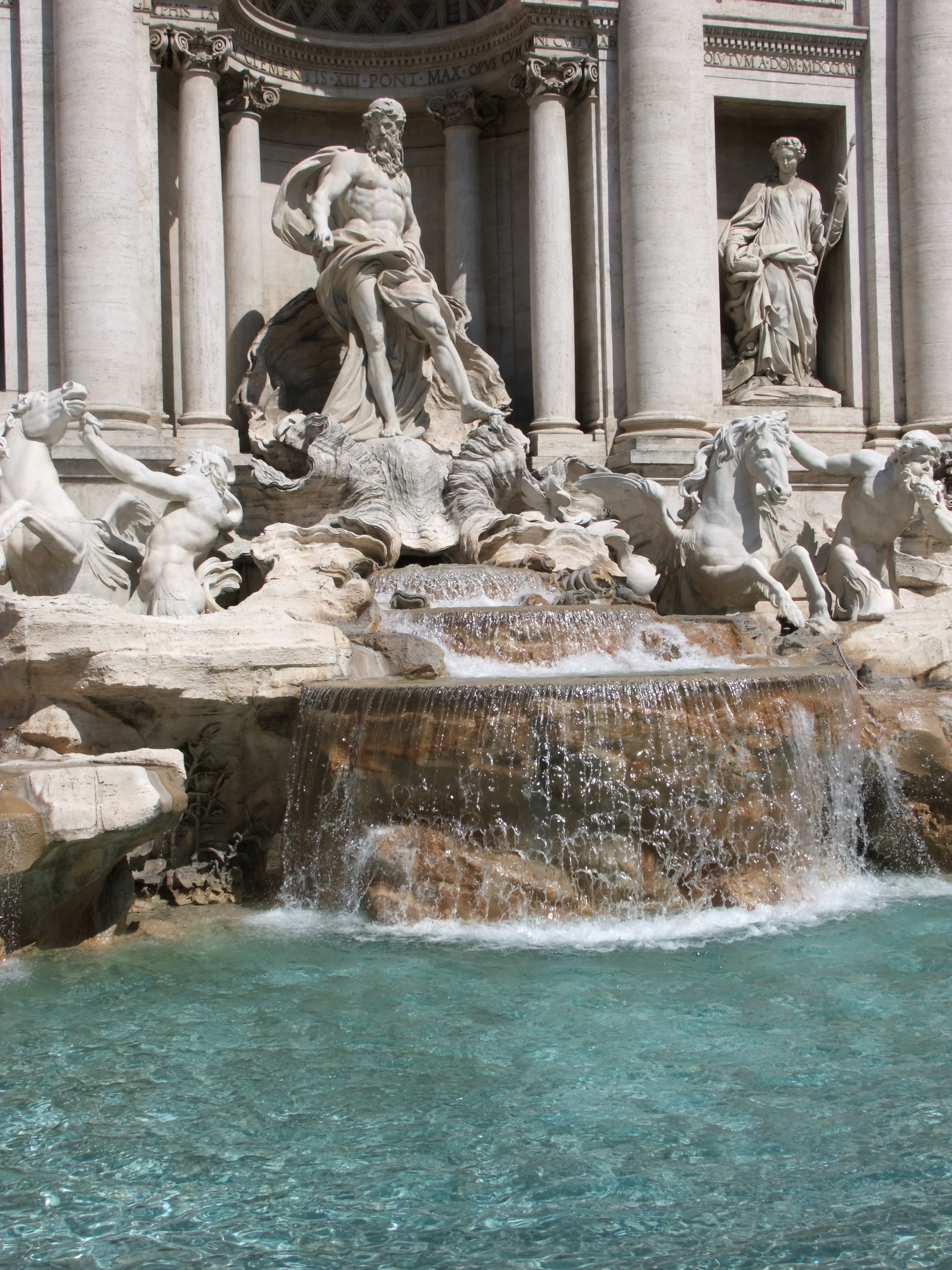
Trevi Fountain, Rome

The theme of third movement "takes on a triumphal character. Fanfares sound. It is as if Neptune's chariot, drawn by river-horses and followed by a cortege of sirens and tritons, were passing on the radiant surface of the water, only to vanish while muted chimes sound in the distance."

The final movement portrays a much more melancholic atmosphere. "It is sad in intent, delicate, restful. Bells toll for the Angelus. Birds twitter and there is a rustling and fluttering of leaves. Then follows the silence of night."

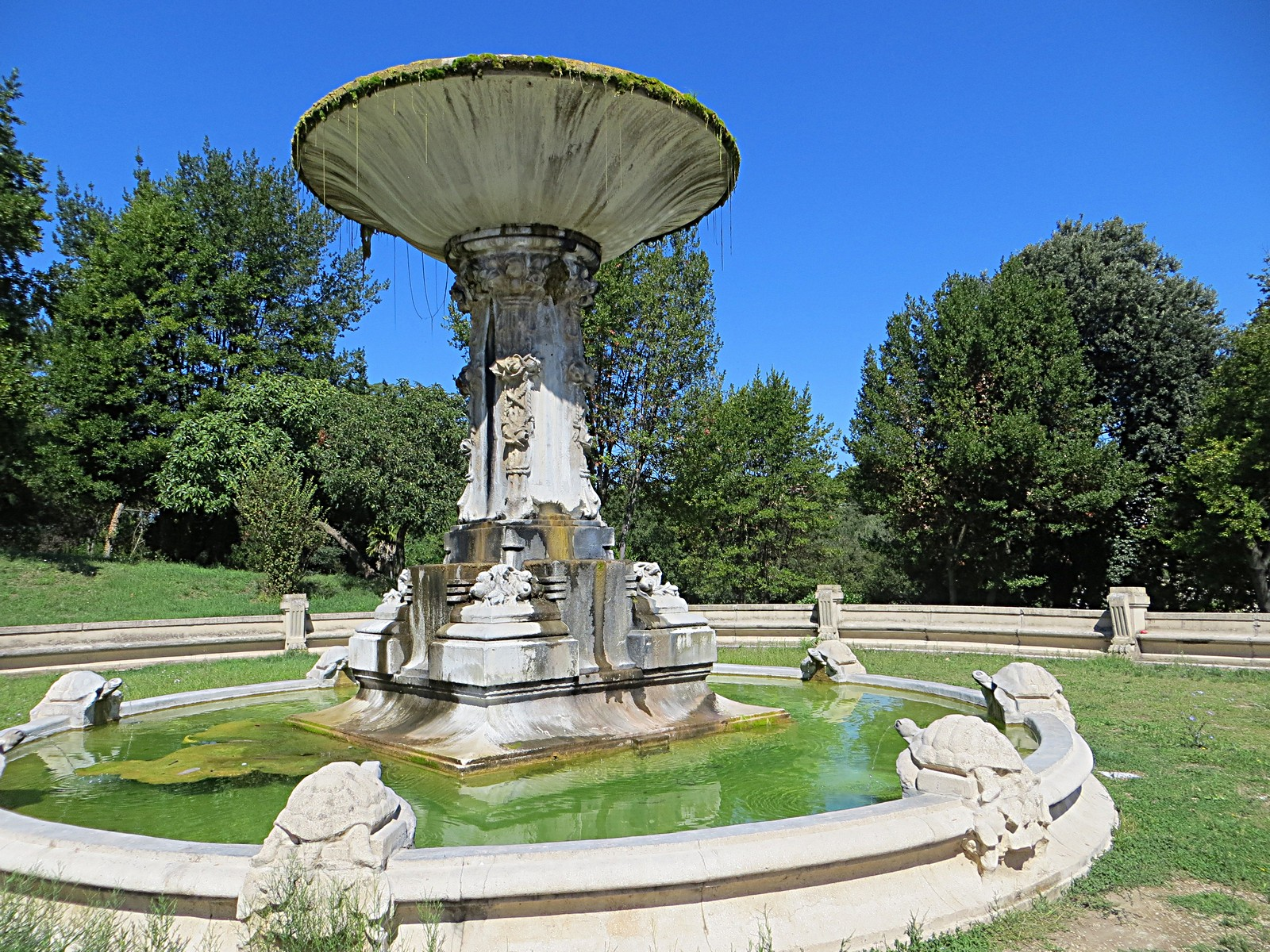
The fountain of Valle Giulia, at the entrance to the Villa Borghese gardens, designed by Cesare Bazzani in 1910

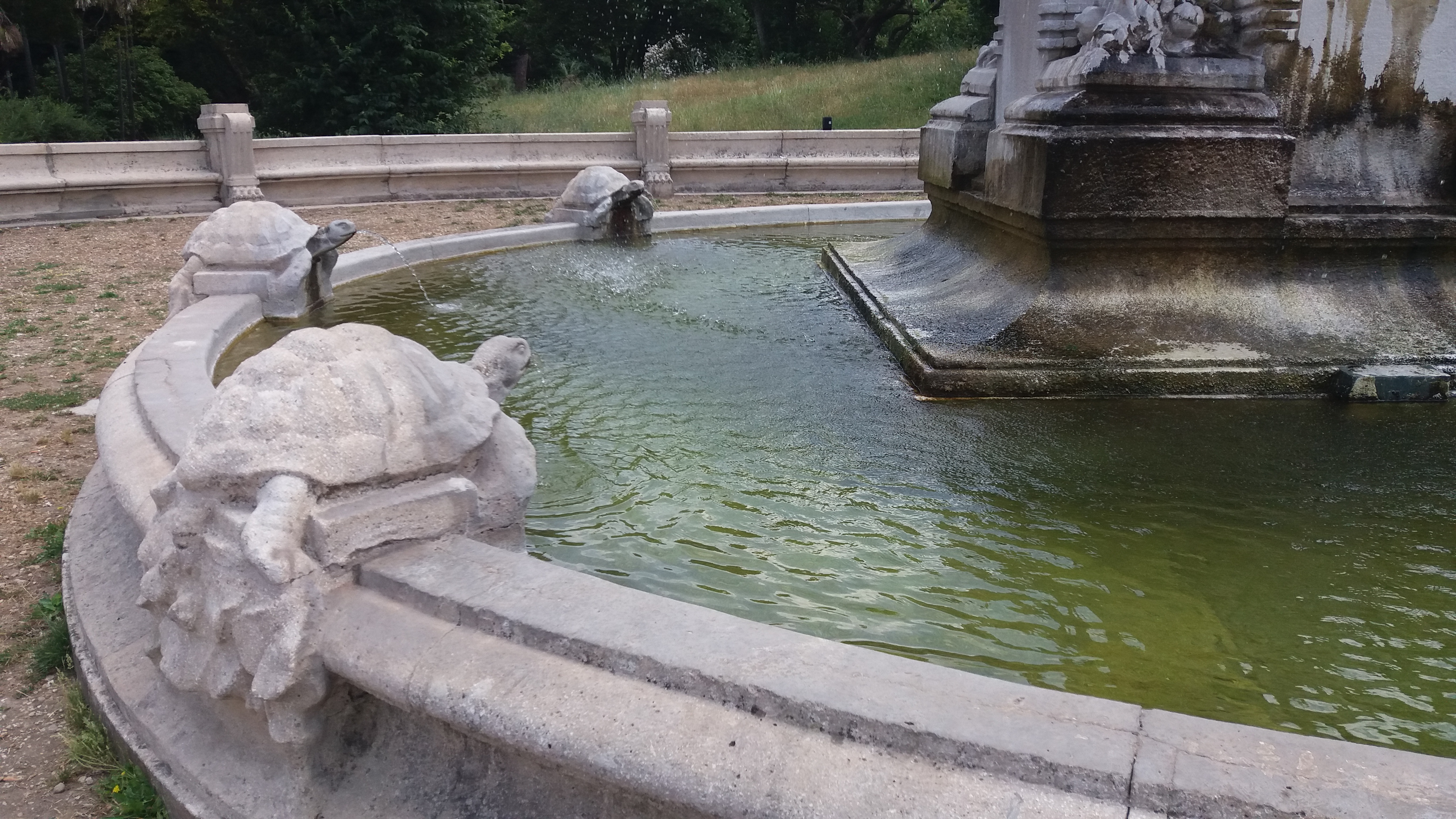
The turtles on the basin of the fountain of Valle Giulia (not to be confused with the Turtle Fountain in Piazza Mattei)

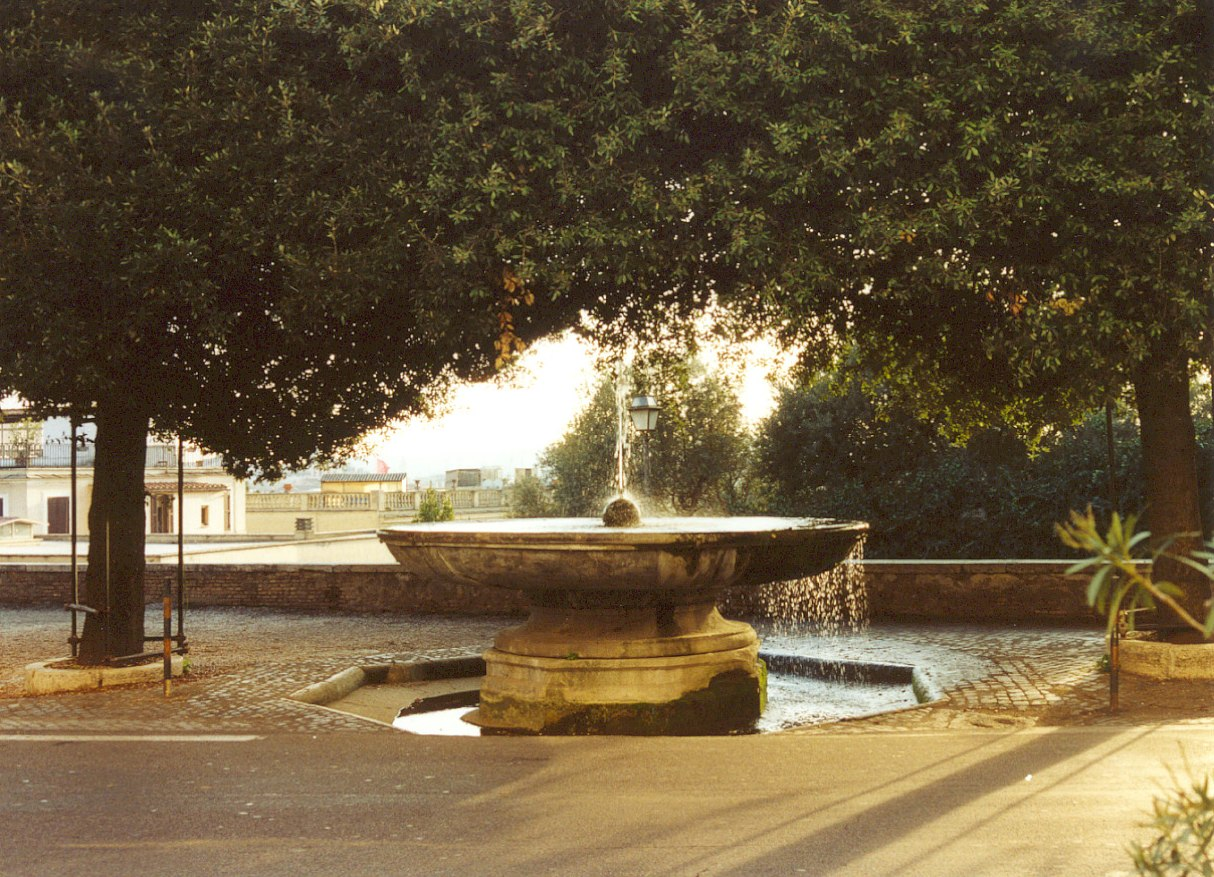
The fountain in front of the Villa Medici, designed by Annibale Lippi in 1589, and popularly known as the "cannonball fountain"

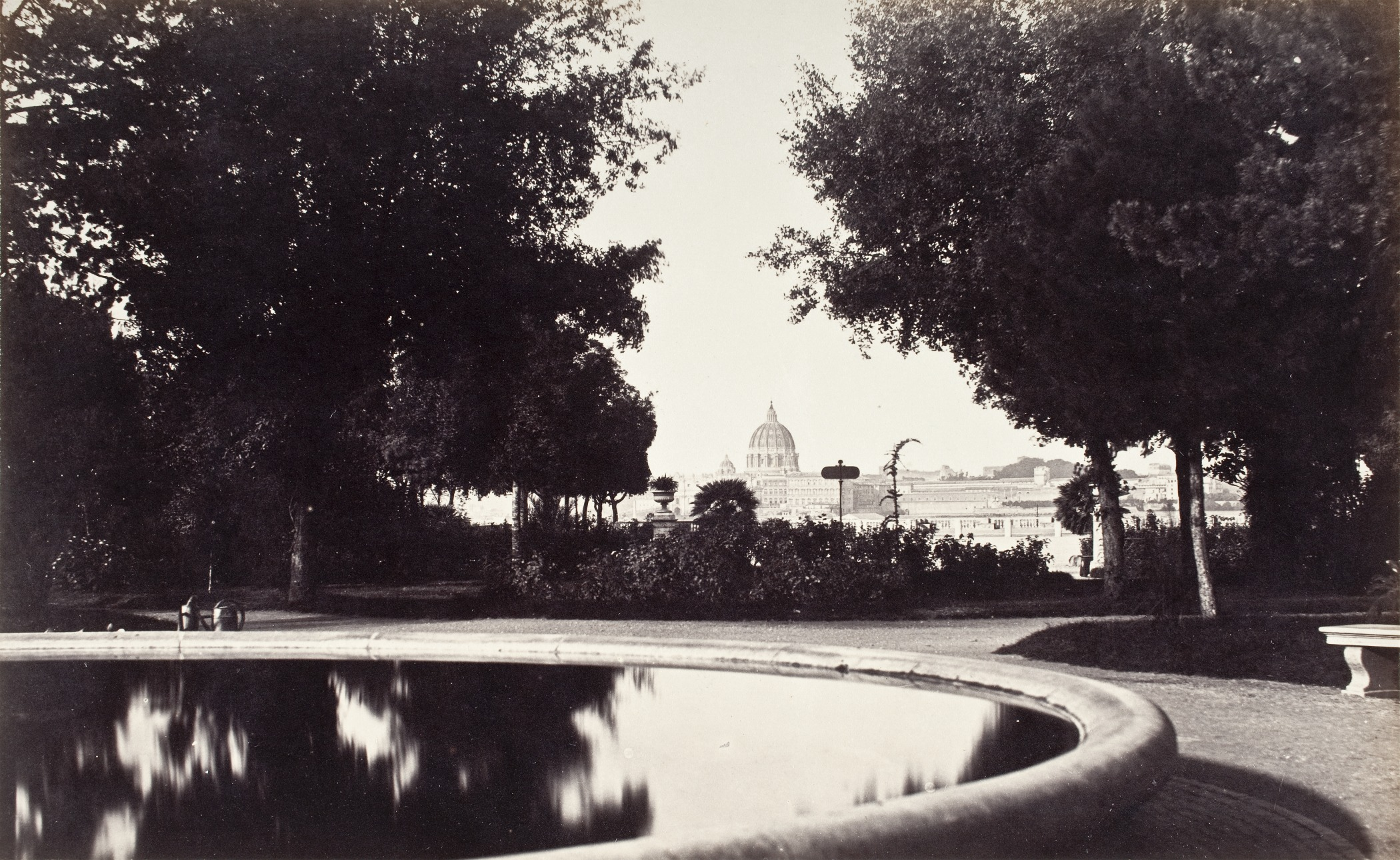
"St. Peter's from Pincian Hill." The Villa Medici fountain photographed by James Anderson in the 1860s

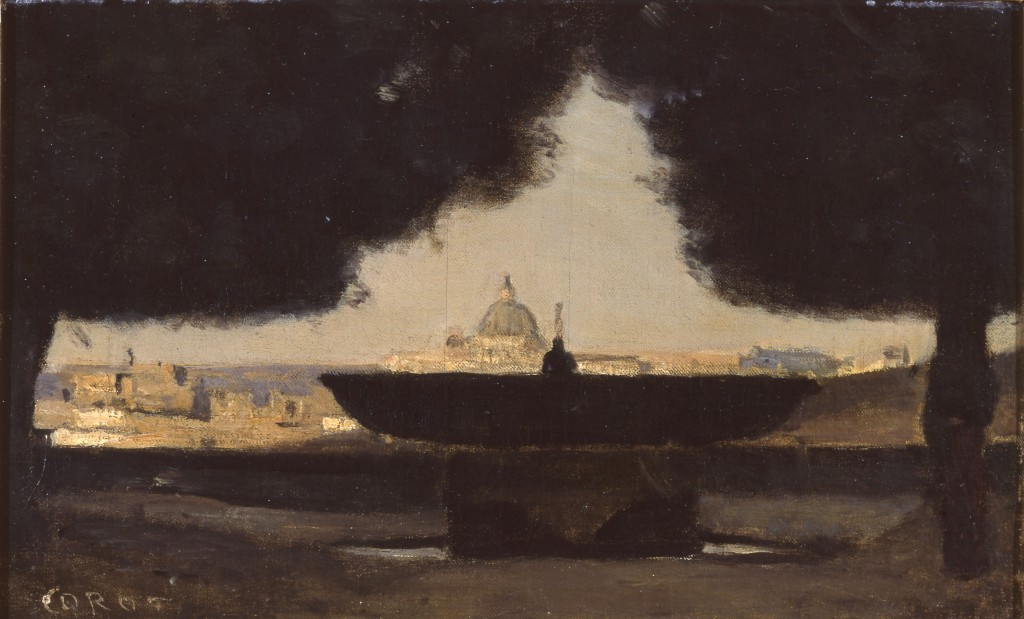
"The basin of the Villa Medici," painted by Camille Corot

== Instrumentation ==
Fountains of Rome calls for the following large orchestra, including piano, celesta, harps, a chime, and organ ad lib.:

- woodwinds: piccolo, 2 flutes, 2 oboes, English horn, 2 clarinets in B♭, bass clarinet in B♭, 2 bassoons
- brass: 4 French horns in F, 3 trumpets in B♭, 3 trombones, bass tuba
- percussion: timpani, 1 pair of crash cymbals, 2 suspended cymbals, triangle, bell in D, glockenspiel
- keyboards: organ (ad lib.), piano, celesta
- strings: 2 harps, 14-16 1st violins, 14 2nd violins, 12 violas, 10-12 cellos, 8 double basses

It was also transcribed for piano four hands (duet) by the composer.

== Performances, reception, and recordings ==
Arturo Toscanini originally planned to conduct the work in 1916, but the Italian composer refused to appear for the performance after a disagreement over his having included some of Wagner's music on a program played during World War I. Consequently, it did not premiere until March 11, 1917, at the Teatro Augusteo in Rome, with Antonio Guarnieri as conductor. Although the premiere was unsuccessful, Toscanini finally conducted the work in Milan in 1918 with tremendous success. It "was acclaimed [as] one of the loveliest of symphonic writings".

The piece was first performed in the United States on February 13, 1919. Toscanini recorded the music with the NBC Symphony Orchestra in Carnegie Hall in 1951; the high fidelity monaural recording was issued on LP and then digitally remastered for release on CD by RCA Victor. Herbert von Karajan recorded the work with the Berlin Philharmonic in 1978. The work has since become one of the most eminent examples of the symphonic poem.
