= International Exhibition of Art (1911) =

World's fair held in Rome

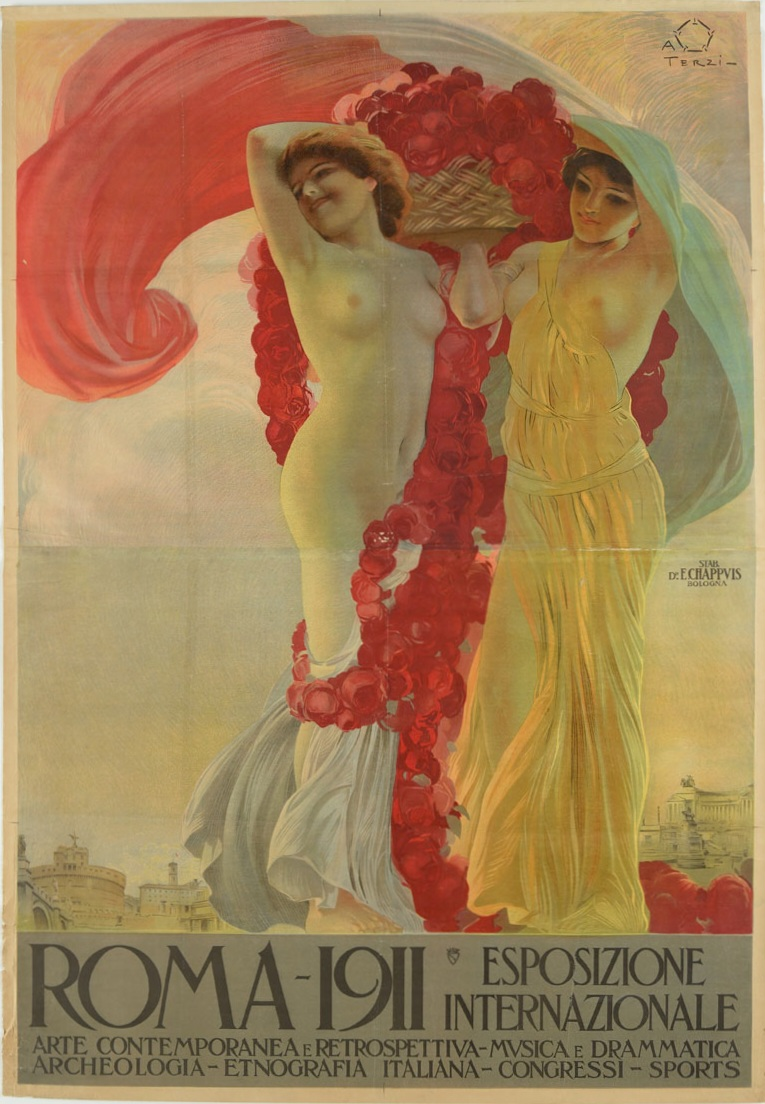
- Poster for the International Exhibition of Art designed by Aleardo Terzi

Overview
- BIE-class: Unrecognized exposition
- Name: International Exhibition of Art
- Visitors: 7,409,145

Timeline
- Opening: 29 April 1911
- Closure: 19 November 1911

International Exhibition of Art (Italian: Esposizione internazionale d'arte) was a world's fair held in Rome in 1911 to celebrate the 50th anniversary of the unification of Italy in the same year as another world's fair in Turin (which had a more scientific focus). It marked the beginnings of the National Roman Museum. The fair's receipts were disappointing over the summer of 1911 because of poor weather and a cholera epidemic.

== Summary ==
The fair was open from 29 April to 19 November 1911, and had 7,409,145 visitors. The participating countries included Austria, Belgium, France, Germany, Japan, England, Russia, Serbia, Spain, USA, Hungary and Italy. The event was solemn, and aware of the new trends in criticism and art. The organizing committee included critics and artist-intellectuals such as Bernard Berenson, Camillo Boito, Walter Crane, Benedetto Croce, Roger Fry, Domenico Gnoli, and Victor Horta.

The Exposition included: a regional and ethnographic exhibition in Piazza d'Armi (now the Della Vittoria district); an international fine arts exhibition in Valle Giulia, featuring pavilions from many countries, including the United States, England, Serbia, Japan, France, Austria-Hungary, Belgium, Germany and Russia; an archaeological exhibition at the Baths of Diocletian, curated by Rodolfo Lanciani; a retrospective art exhibitions at Castel Sant'Angelo; an exhibition on the Roman countryside near the Tiber.

The largest area was that devoted to the ethnographic exhibition in Piazza d'Armi, which was connected to the international fine arts exhibition in Valle Giulia by the new Ponte del Risorgimento, the first bridge in Rome made in reinforced concrete. The Fine Arts section was held in Valle Giulia, between Villa Giulia and Villa Borghese. This area, known as Vigna Cartoni until then, had previously been used for agriculture. In preparation for the event, a team of architects led by Cesare Bazzani drastically modified the entire area, giving it a public function and creating a road system where there had previously been none.

== National pavilions ==
The British Pavilion, designed by Sir Edwin Lutyens, was built in the English Baroque style, drawing inspiration from St Paul's Cathedral. At the time, it was the most extensive exhibition of British art on the continent, significantly larger than the British art exhibition at the 1900 Paris Expo. It featured over 1,200 oil paintings by renowned British artists, including the Pre-Raphaelites, Aubrey Beardsley, Charles Ricketts, and Charles Shannon. In 1912 the building was taken over by the British School at Rome, which is still based there. The centrepiece of the Austrian Pavilion was the Klimt Hall. Due to its semicircular shape and almost sacred aura, it was often referred to in the press as the 'tempietto' or 'apse'. Inside, Klimt exhibited eight paintings and four drawings, including portraits, landscapes and allegorical subjects. These include the renowned painting The Kiss, portraits of Mrs Wittgenstein and Emilie Louise Flöge, and two elaborate Symbolist works: Death and Life and the elegantly stylised Water Serpents I (also known as The Sisters). The Serbian pavilion was designed by Petar Bajalović. Several Serbian and regional artists presented their works, including Marko Murat, Ivan Meštrović, Dragomir Arambašić, Đorđe Jovanović, Toma Rosandić.

== Legacy ==
The main legacy of the exhibition was the development of the area around the Viale delle Belle Arti into museum district; it includes the Palazzo delle Belle Arti, designed for the fair by Cesare Bazzani – which, since 1915, has housed the Galleria Nazionale d'Arte Moderna – , the National Etruscan Museum, and the British School at Rome (originally the English Pavilion, designed by Sir Edwin Lutyens).

== Gallery ==
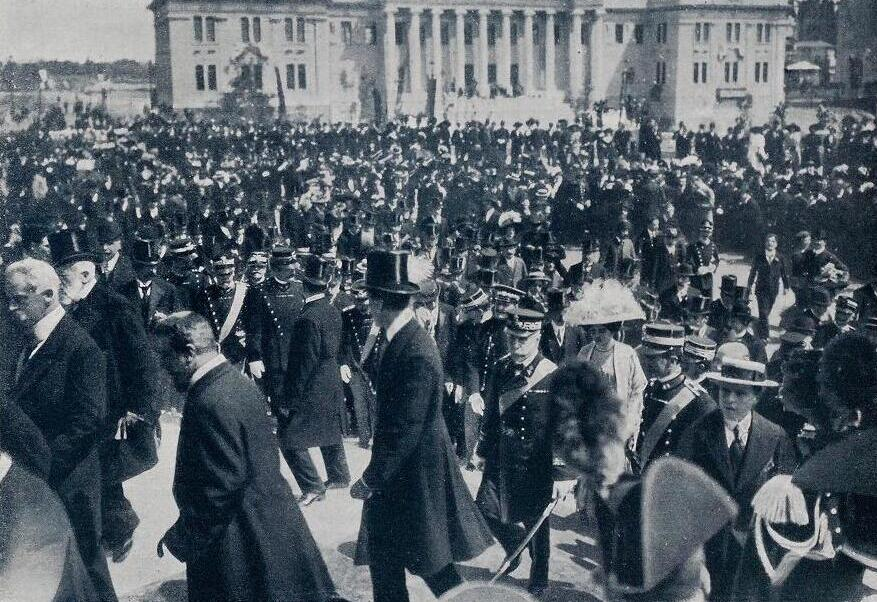
The inauguration of the Ethnographic fair

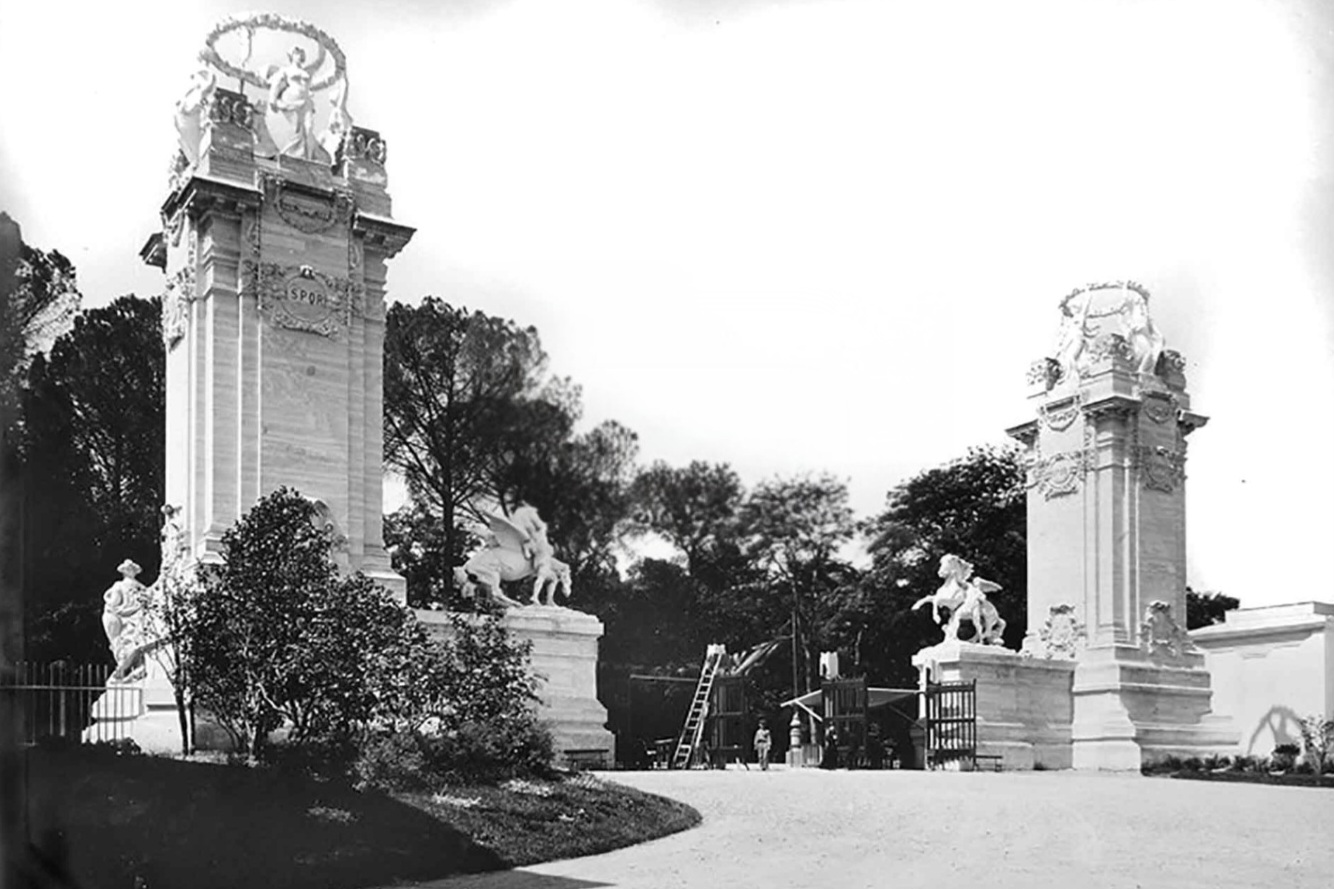
The Monumental Entrance

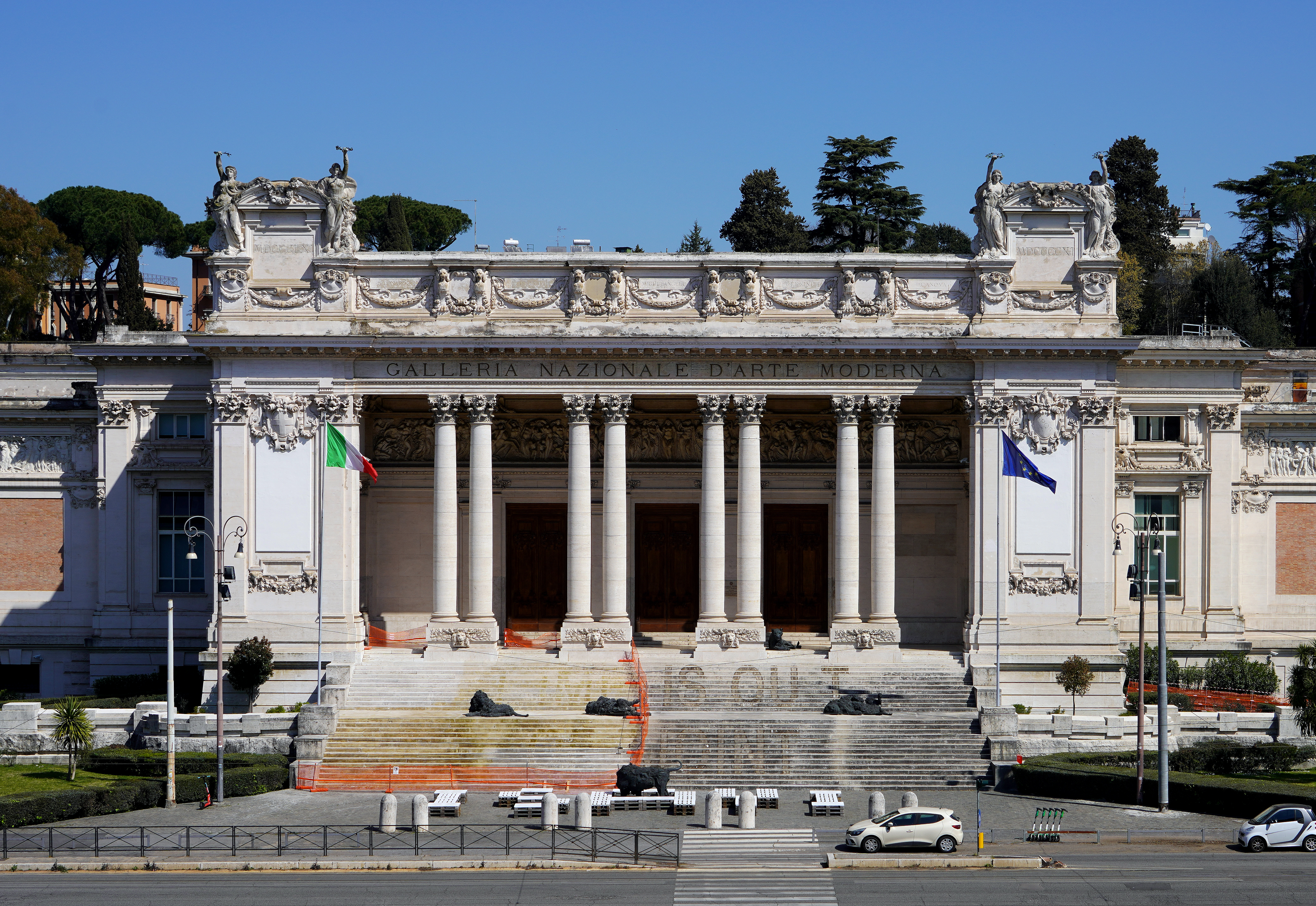
The Galleria Nazionale d'Arte Moderna designed by Cesare Bazzani

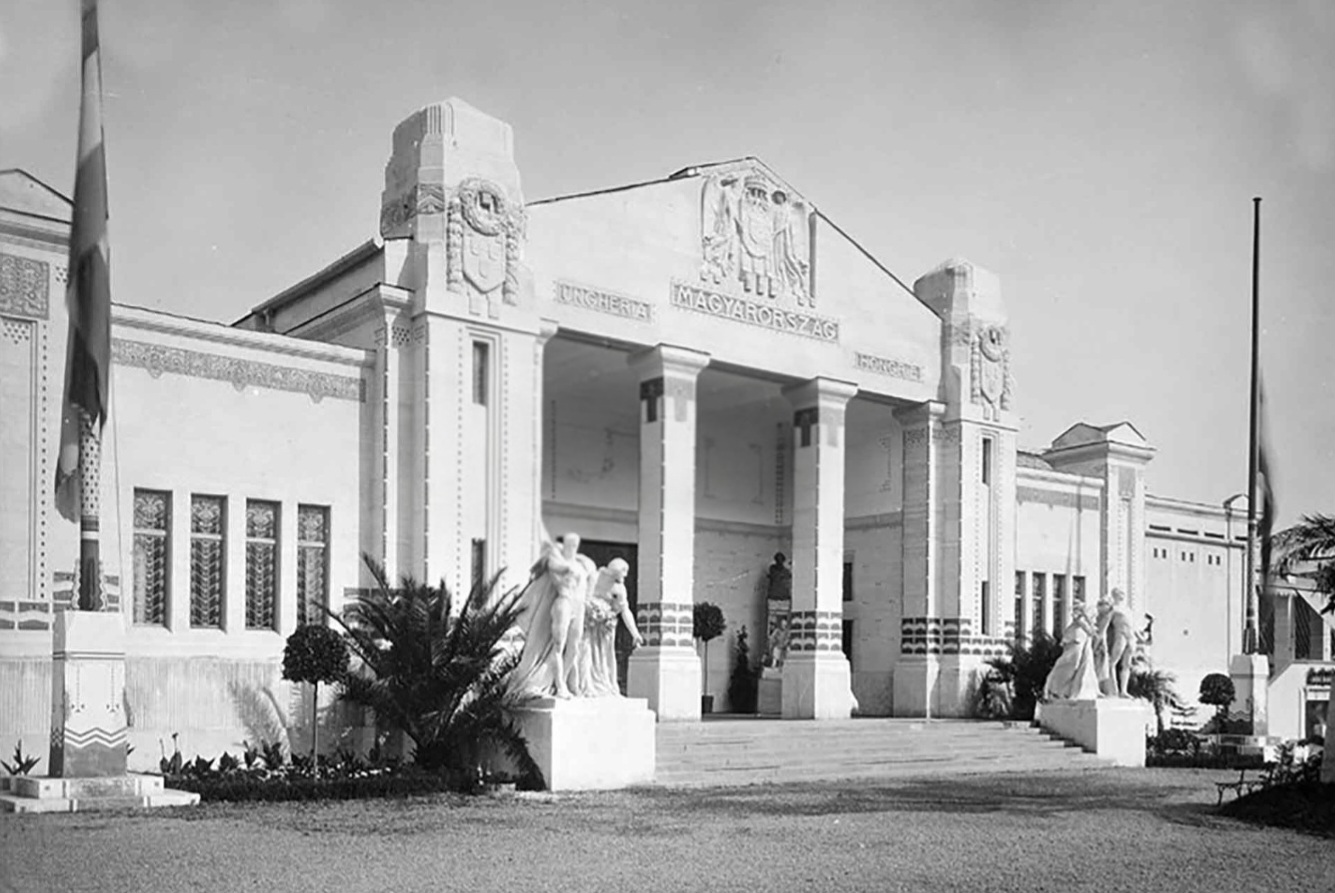
The Hungarian Pavilion

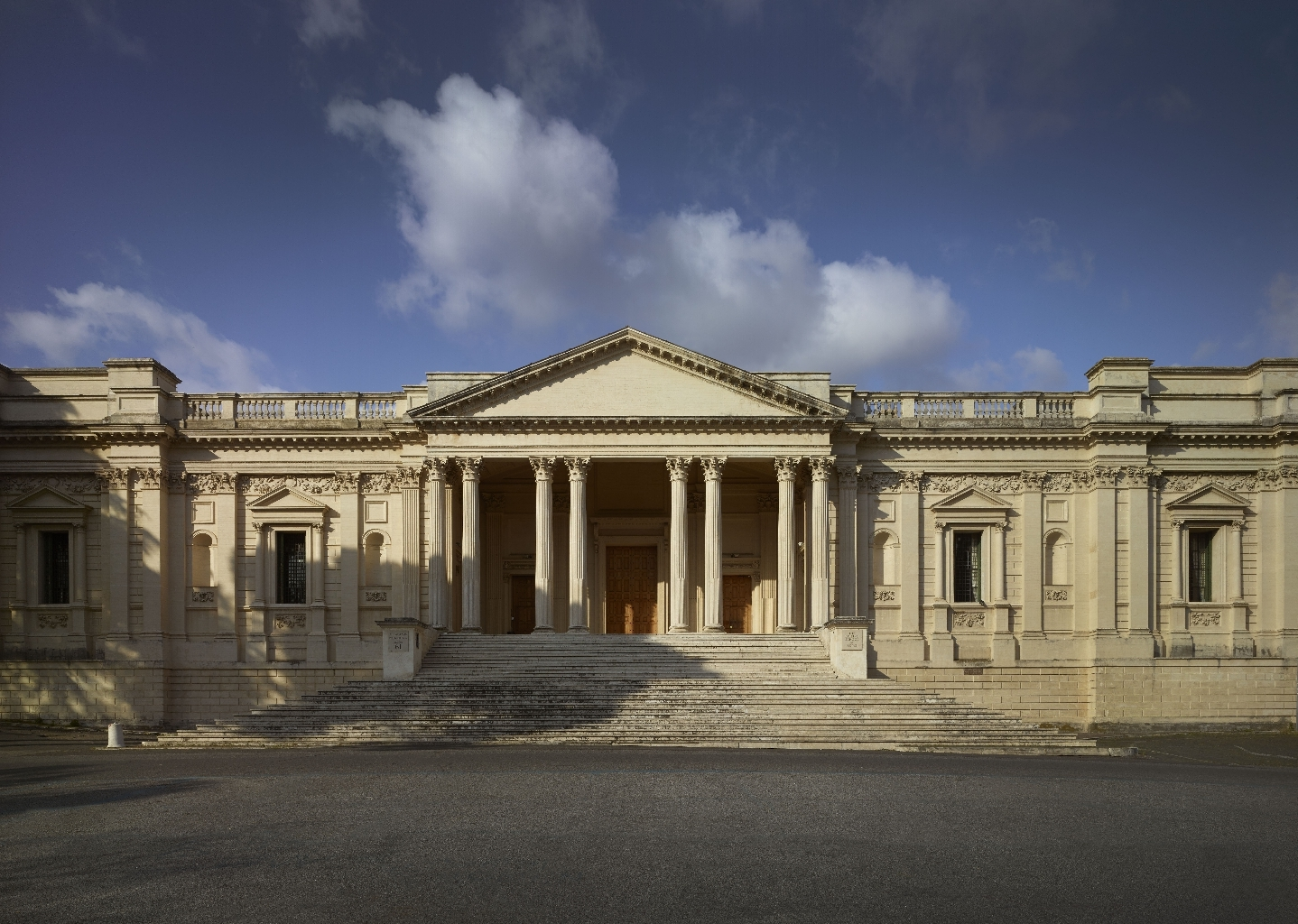
The British Pavilion designed by Sir Edwin Lutyens

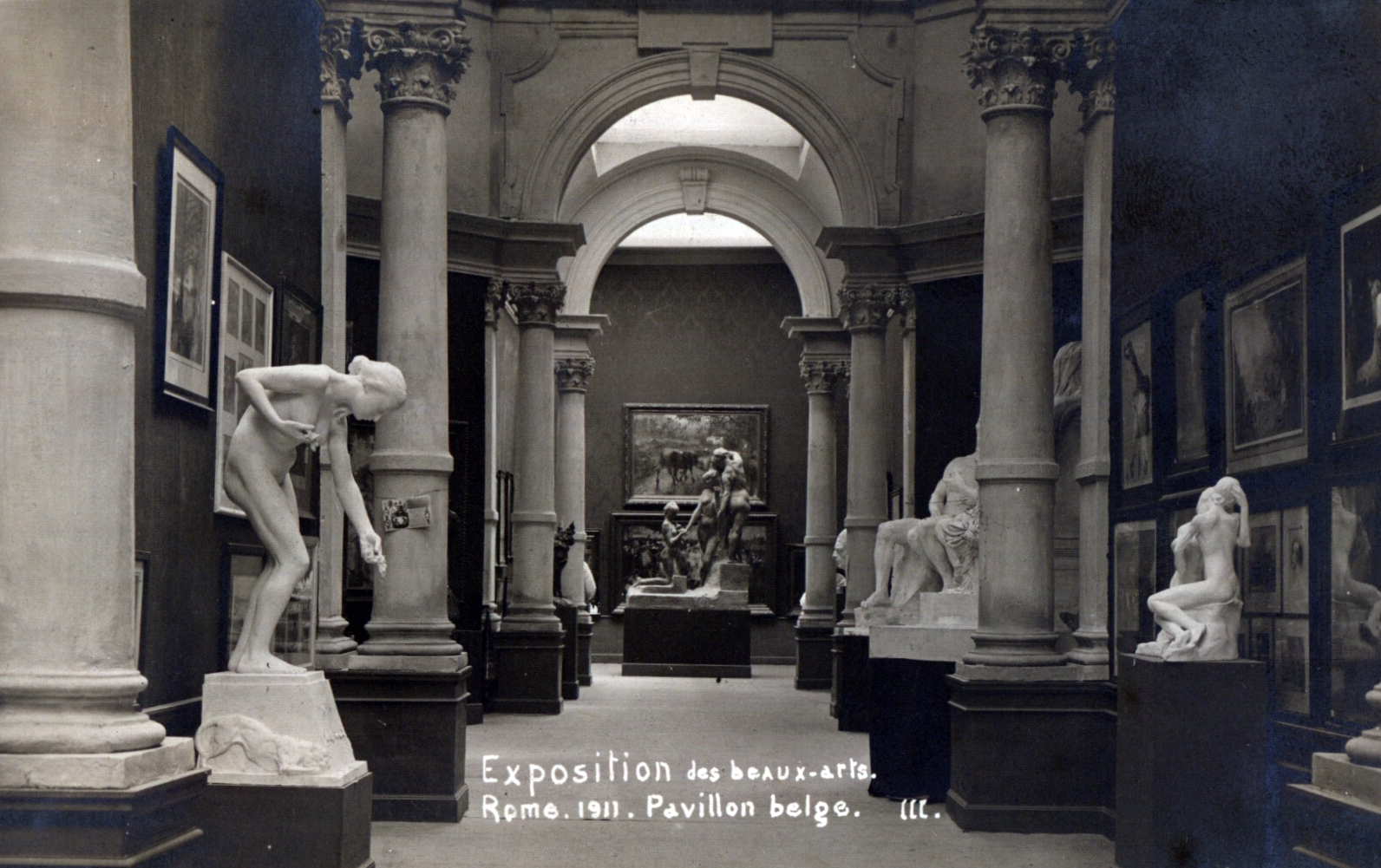
Interior of the Belgian Pavilion

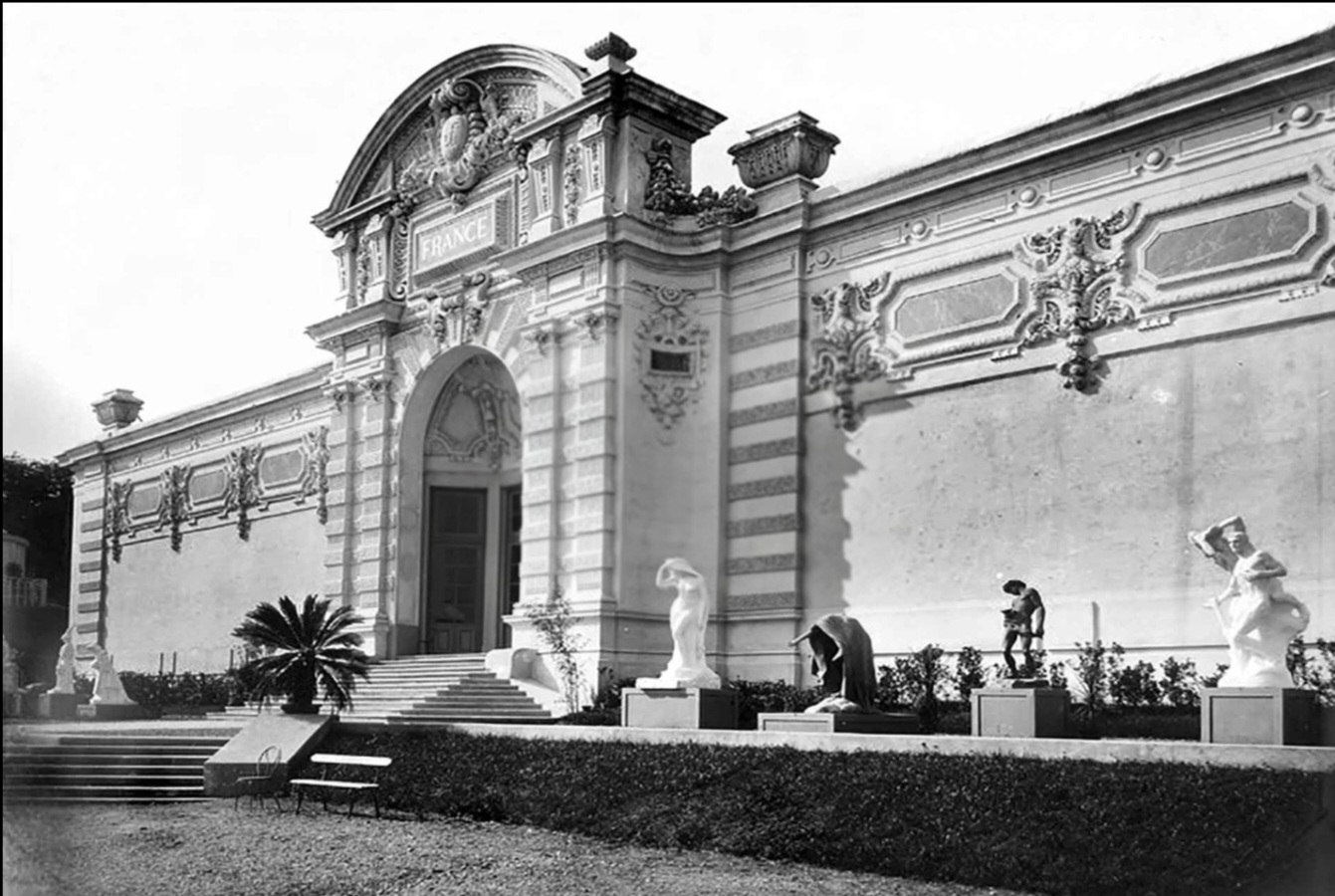
The French pavilion

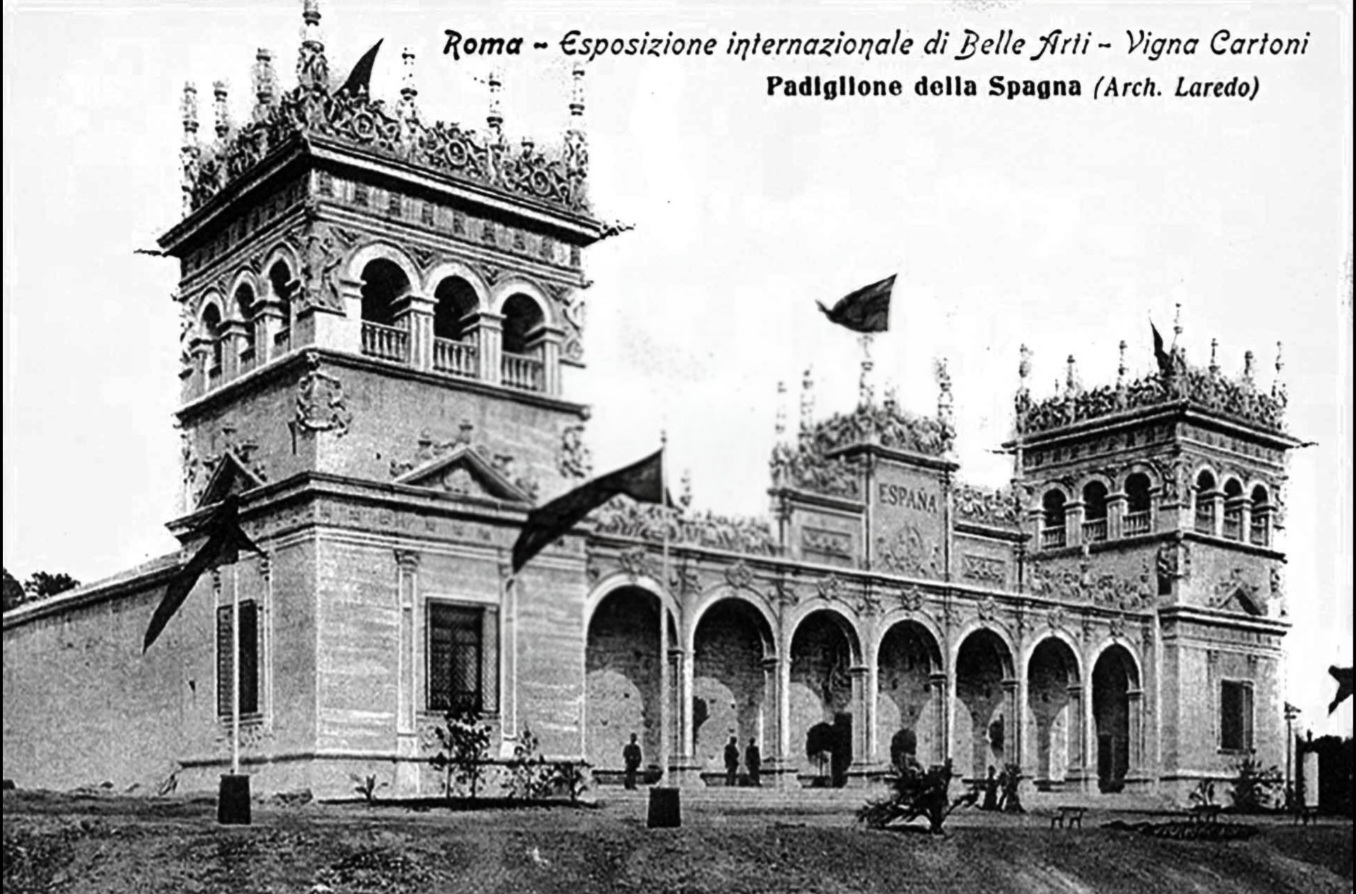
The Spanish Pavilion designed by Eladio Laredo

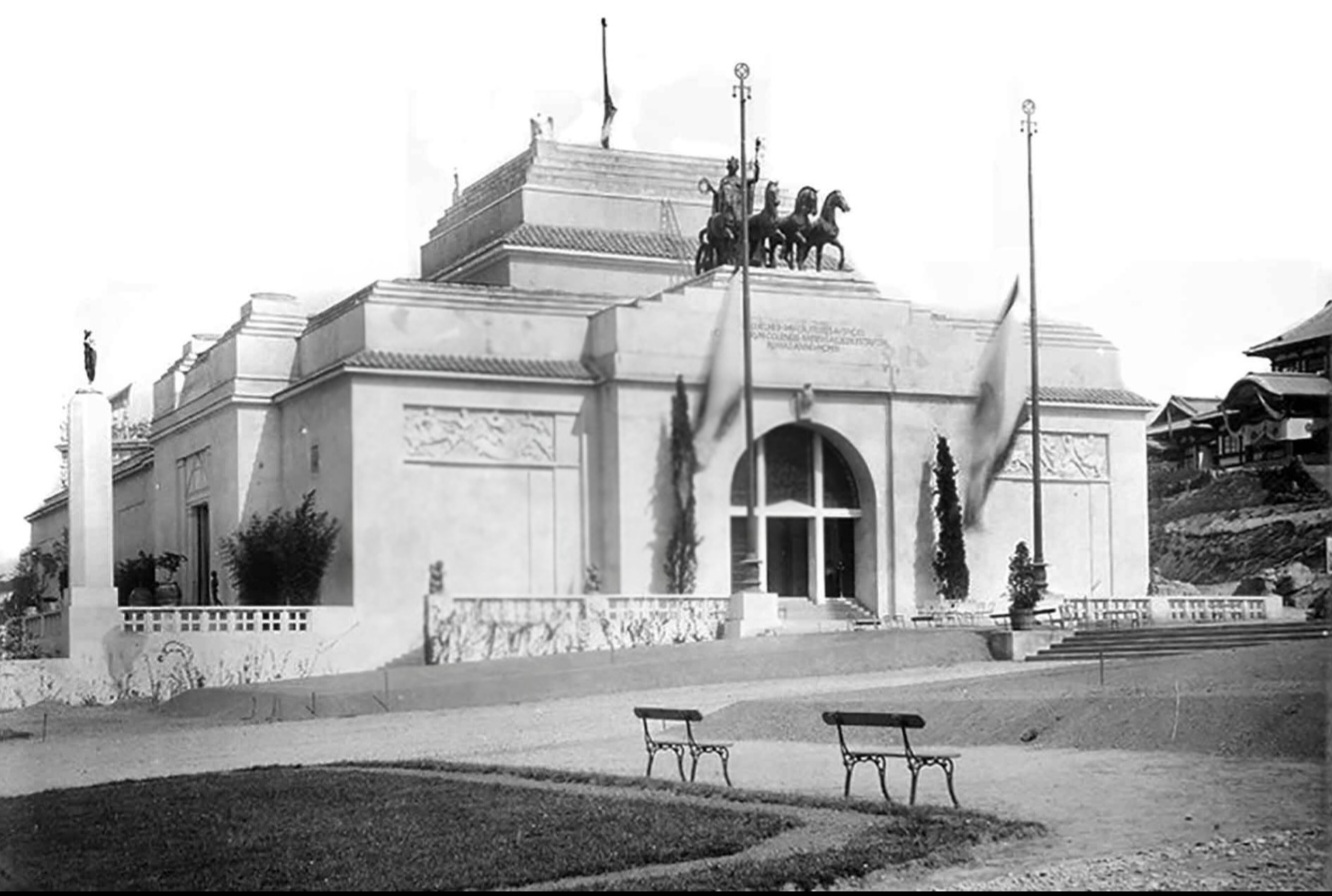
The German Pavilion

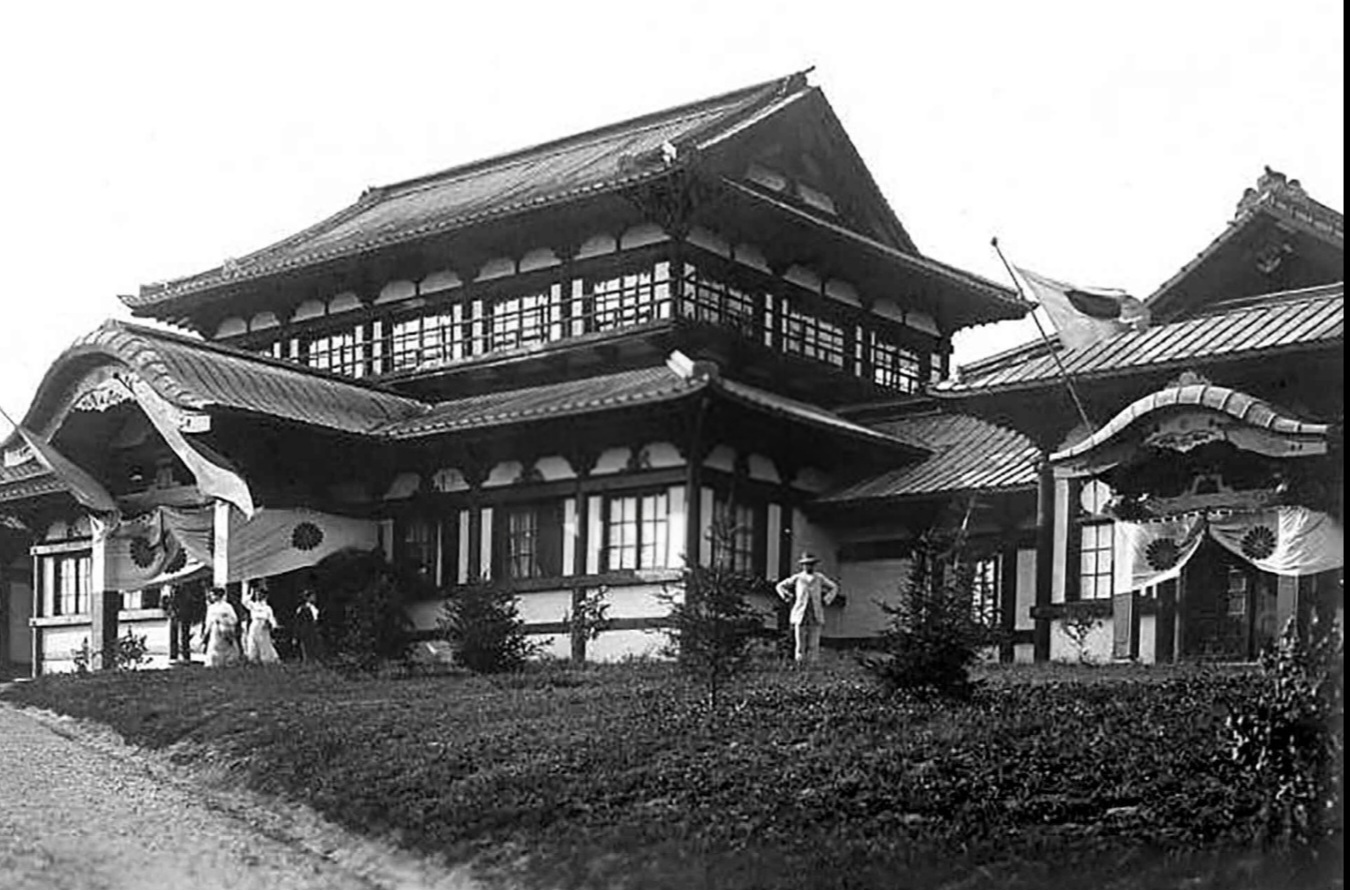
The Japanese pavilion

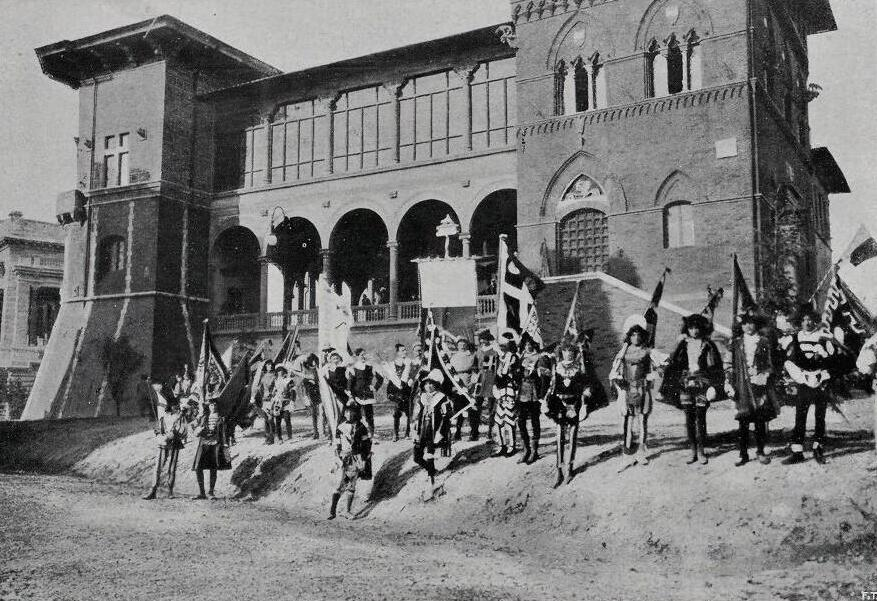
The Pavilion of Tuscany at the Ethnographic Exhibition

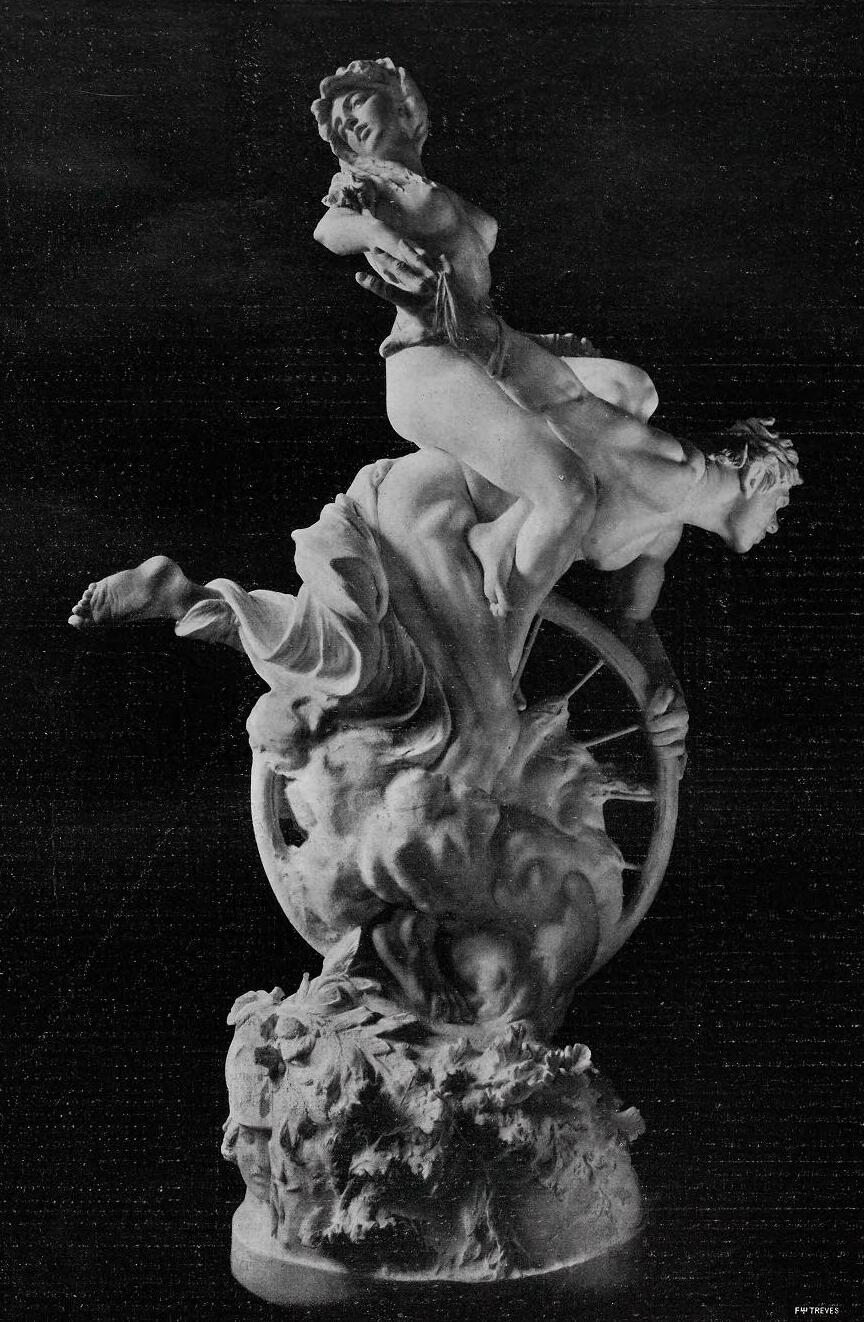
Idealità e materialismo by Giulio Monteverde. Exhibited at the International Exhibition of Art (1911).

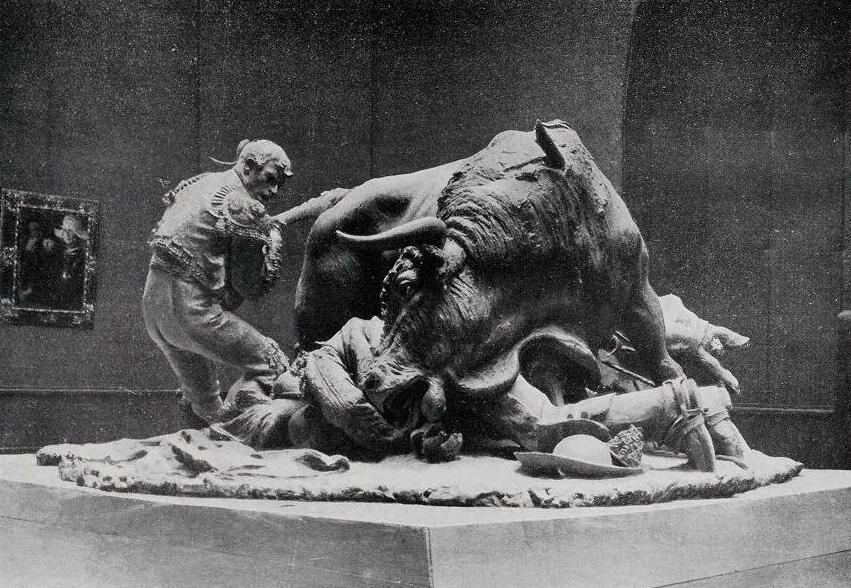
The Bullfighter by Mariano Benlliure. Exhibited at the International Exhibition of Art (1911).

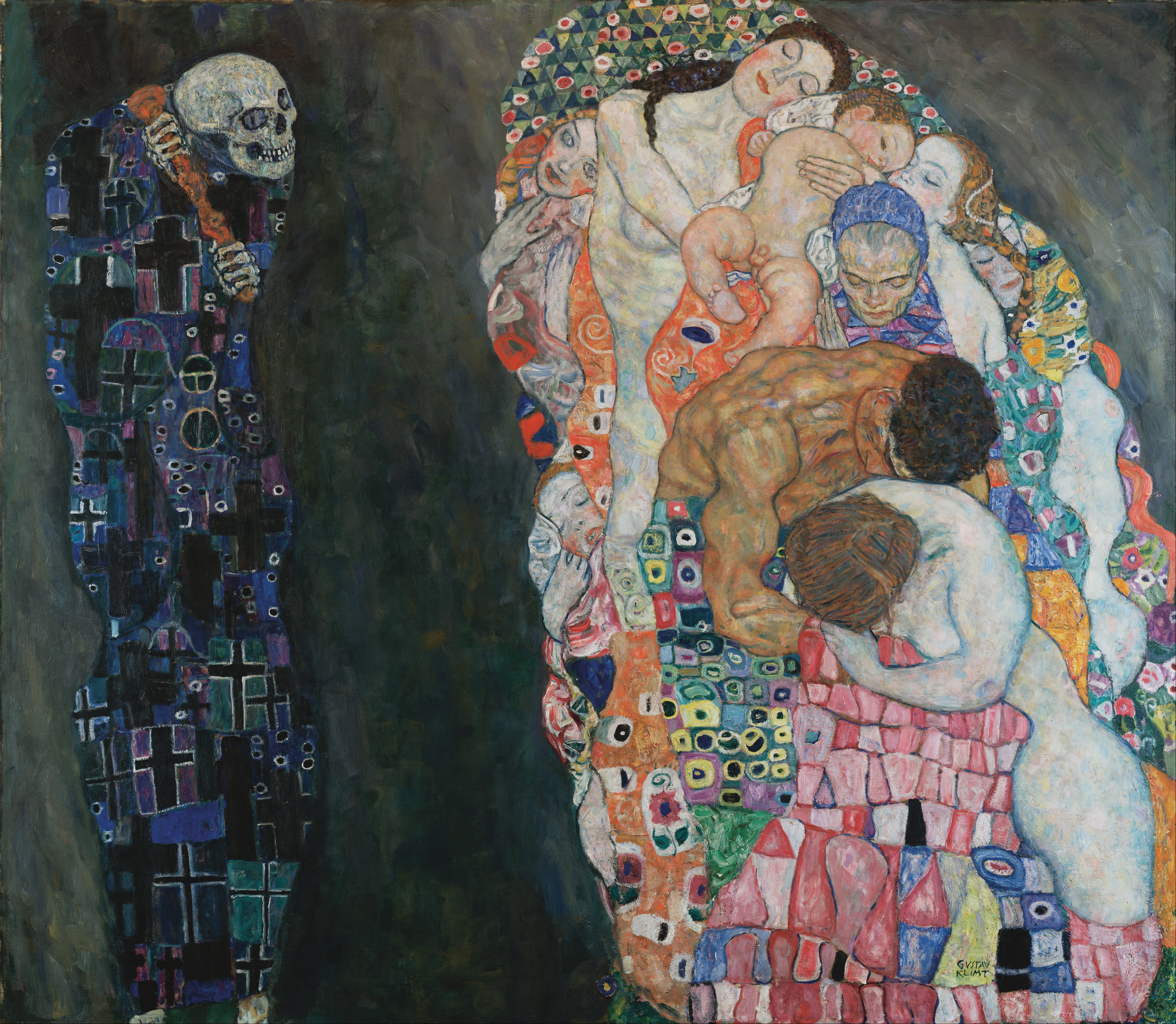
Death and Life by Gustav Klimt. Exhibited at the International Exhibition of Art (1911).

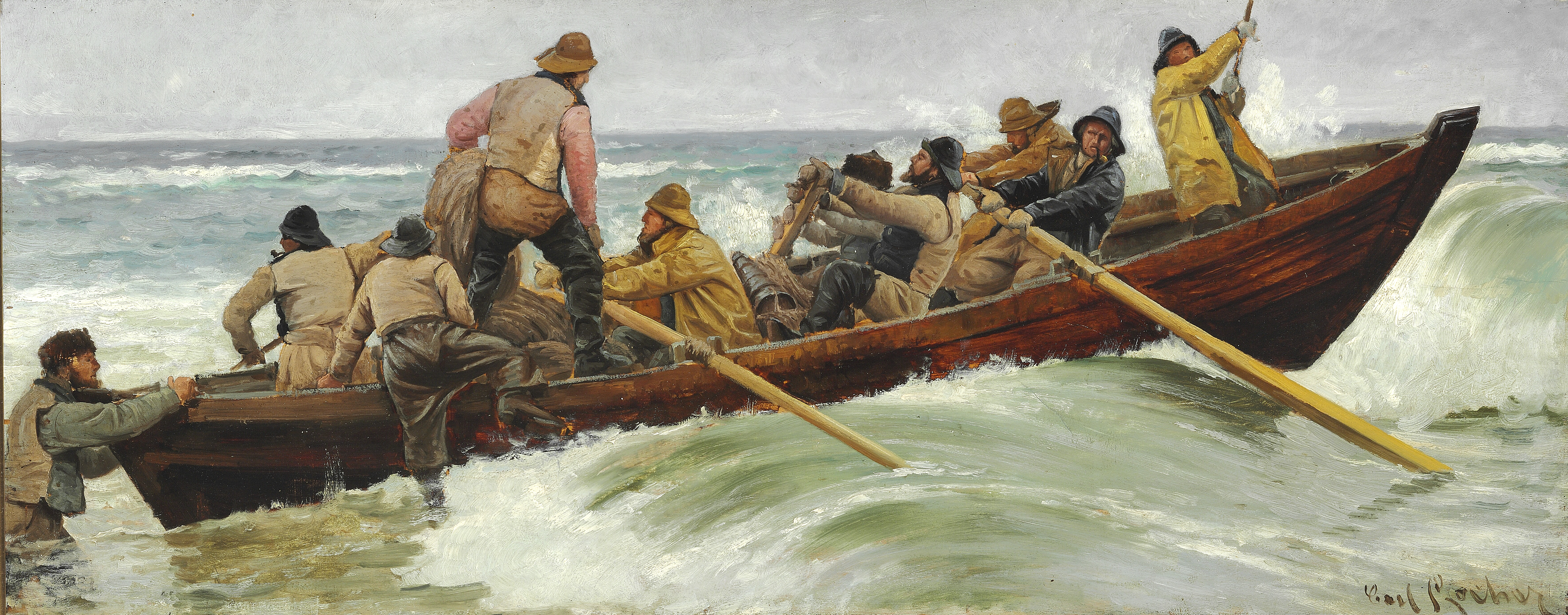
The rescue boat goes out by Carl Locher. Exhibited at the International Exhibition of Art (1911).

== Bibliography ==
- Aurigemma, Maria Giulia (2012). "1911: il Congresso artistico internazionale di Roma". In R. Cioffi; O. Scognamiglio (eds.). Mosaico. Temi e metodi d'arte e critica per Gianni Carlo Sciolla. Naples: Luciano editore. pp. 31–42. ISBN 9788860261519.
