= Zucchero Fornaciari discography =

Zucchero discography
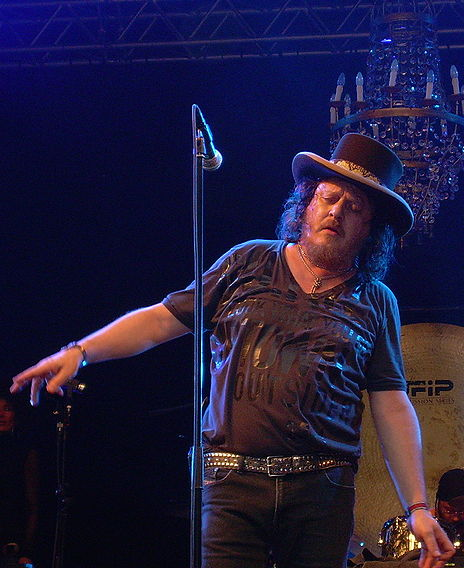
- Zucchero live at the Skanderborg Festival 2007, in Denmark
- Studio albums: 15
- Soundtrack albums: 1
- Live albums: 4
- Compilation albums: 9
- Side projects: 1

The discography of Zucchero, an Italian rock blues singer-songwriter, consists of 15 studio albums, one soundtrack album, seven compilation albums, two live albums and more than sixty singles. In 1993, Zucchero has also released a studio album with the band Adelmo e i suoi Sorapis, also including Equipe 84's Maurizio Vandelli and Pooh's Dodi Battaglia.

Zucchero's first two studio albums didn't reach commercial success and failed to chart in Italy, while 1986's Rispetto entered the Top 10 in his home country, where it sold more than 220,000 copies. Its follow-up, titled Blue's, became the best-selling album in Italy of 1987, while 1989's Oro Incenso & Birra was certified eight-times platinum in Italy. For the latter as of 2015 are reported sales of over 8 million copies worldwide.

In 1991, Zucchero released his self-titled compilation, featuring the English-language version of some of his biggest hits, including the single "Senza una donna (Without a Woman)", a duet with Paul Young which charted in the Top 5 in the United Kingdom and United States and topped the European Hot 100. The album Spirito DiVino, released in 1995, has sold more than 2.5 million copies worldwide and was certified Platinum by the International Federation of the Phonographic Industry for European sales exceeding million units. The following studio albums were also million selling.

As of 2017, Zucchero has released 10 Italian number-one studio albums, including his last effort Black Cat, and 4 Italian number-one compilation albums, including 1996's The Best of Zucchero Sugar Fornaciari's Greatest Hits, which was certified triple platinum in Europe, and 2004's Zu & Co., which was also certified platinum in Europe.

Zucchero has sold over 50 million records around the world.

== Albums ==
=== Studio albums ===
List of albums, with selected chart positions and certifications
Title	Album details	Peak chart positions										Sales	Certifications
Title	Album details	ITA	AUT	BEL (FL)	BEL (WA)	FRA	GER	NLD	SWE	SWI	US World	Sales	Certifications
Un po' di Zucchero	Released: 1983; Label: Polydor; Formats: LP, cassette, CD	—	—	—	—	—	—	—	—	—	—		
Zucchero & The Randy Jackson Band	Released: 8 March 1985; Label: Polydor; Formats: LP, cassette, CD	—	—	—	—	—	—	—	—	—	—		
Rispetto	Released: 28 April 1986; Label: Polydor; Formats: LP, cassette, CD	7	—	—	—	—	—	—	—	—	—	ITA: 220,000	ITA: Platinum
Blue's	Released: 15 June 1987; Label: Polydor; Formats: LP, cassette, CD	1	—	—	—	—	—	43	—	18	—	ITA: 1,500,000	ITA: Platinum; SWI: Platinum
Oro incenso e birra	Released: 13 June 1989; Label: Polydor; Formats: LP, cassette, CD	1	—	—	—	17	—	36	50	1	—	ITA: 2,000,000	ITA: Gold; FRA: Platinum; SWI: Platinum
Miserere	Released: 1 October 1992; Label: Polydor; Formats: LP, cassette, CD	1	—	—	—	33	—	73	—	8	—	ITA: 1,400,000	SWI: Platinum
Spirito DiVino	Released: 27 May 1995; Label: Polydor; Formats: LP, cassette, CD	1	—	15	14	4	17	29	—	3	—	ITA: 1,300,000	SWI: Platinum; FRA: Platinum; BEL: Platinum; EU: Platinum
BlueSugar	Released: 5 November 1998; Label: Polydor; Formats: LP, cassette, CD	1	14	—	—	46	72	—	—	6	—	ITA: 1,000,000	SWI: Platinum
Shake	Released: 14 September 2001; Label: Polydor, Universal; Formats: cassette, CD	1	16	39	22	40	25	67	—	1	—		SWI: 3× Platinum; FRA: Gold; BEL: Gold; EU: Platinum
Fly	Released: 22 September 2006; Label: Polydor, Universal; Formats: CD, download	1	3	48	40	68	23	29	—	1	—	ITA: 300,000	AUT: Gold; SWI: 2× Platinum
Chocabeck	Released: 3 November 2010; Label: Polydor, Universal; Formats: CD, LP, download	1	7	47	53	112	16	31	—	2	—		ITA: 5× Platinum; AUT: Gold; SWI: Platinum
Black Cat	Released: 29 April 2016; Label: Universal; Formats: CD, LP, download	1	2	33	29	60	13	24	—	1	9		ITA: 2× Platinum; AUT: Gold; SWI: Gold
D.O.C.	Released: 8 November 2019; Label: Polydor; Formats: CD, LP, download	2	6	73	30	127	—	—	—	1	—		ITA: Platinum
Inacustico - D.O.C. & More	Released: 14 May 2021; Label: Polydor; Formats: 2CD, 3LP, download	7	—	—	—	—	—	—	—	—	—		
Discover	Released: 19 November 2021; Label: Polydor; Formats: CD, 2LP, download	4	16	—	98	—	51	—	—	10	—		ITA: Gold
Discover II	Released: 8 November 2024; Label: Universal Music; Formats: CD, 2LP, download	5	7	—	—	—	68	—	—	4	—		
"—" denotes albums that did not chart or were not released

=== Soundtracks ===
List of albums, with selected chart positions
Title	Album details	Peak chart positions
Title	Album details	ITA
Snack Bar Budapest	Released: 11 November 1988; Label: Polydor; Formats: LP, cassette, CD	14

=== Compilation albums ===
List of albums, with selected chart positions and certifications
Title	Album details	Peak chart positions										Certifications
Title	Album details	ITA	AUT	BEL (FL)	BEL (WA)	GER	NLD	SWE	SWI	UK	US	Certifications
Six Mix	Released: 1988 (Germany only); Label: Polydor; Formats: LP, cassette	—	—	—	—	—	—	—	—	—	—	
Zucchero	Released: 1990; Label: Polydor; Formats: LP, cassette, CD	—	—	—	—	9	13	20	7	29	—	FRA: Gold; SWI: Platinum
Diamante	Released: 24 February 1992; Label: Polydor; Formats: LP, cassette, CD	—	—	—	—	—	—	—	—	—	—	
The Best of Zucchero Sugar Fornaciari's Greatest Hits	Released: 19 November 1996; Label: Polydor; Formats: LP, cassette, CD	1	7	4	4	10	15	53	2	—	—	FRA: 3× Platinum; SWI: 3× Platinum; AUT: Gold, Platinum; BEL: Gold; GER: Gold; NLD: Gold; POR: Gold; EU: 3× Platinum
Overdose d'amore the ballads	Released: 1 January 1999; Label: Polydor; Formats: CD, cassette	—	—	—	—	—	—	—	—	—	—	
Zu & Co.	Released: 14 May 2004; Label: Polydor; Formats: CD	1	1	1	26	4	14	—	1	—	84	SWI: 2× Platinum; AUT: Platinum; GER: 3× Gold; EU: Platinum; FRA: Gold; NLD: Gold; BEL: Gold; ITA: Gold
All the Best	Released: 23 November 2007; Label: Polydor; Formats: CD, download	1	6	51	50	16	64	—	2	—	—	ITA: Platinum; SWI: Platinum; GER: Gold; AUT: Gold
La Sesion Cubana	Released: 20 November 2012; Label: Universal Music; Formats: CD, download	1	1	52	65	40	57	—	5	—	—	ITA: 3× Platinum; AUT: Gold; SWI: Gold
All the Best + Zu & Co.	Released: 14 November 2014; Label: Universal; Formats: 2xCD, download; Edition: Limited	—	—	—	—	—	—	—	37	—	—	
Wanted (The Best Collection)	Released: 3 November 2017; Label: Universal; Formats: CD, download	3	20	113	108	94	—	—	15	—	—	ITA: Platinum
"—" denotes albums that did not chart or were not released.

=== Live albums ===
List of albums, with selected chart positions and certifications
Title	Album details	Peak chart positions				Certifications
Title	Album details	ITA (FIMI)	ITA (M&D)	AUT	SWI	Certifications
Zucchero Live at the Kremlin	Released: 4 November 1991; Label: Polydor; Formats: CD, VHS	—	6	—	28	
Live in Italy	Released: 27 November 2008; Label: Polydor, Universal; Formats: 2×CD + 2×DVD	7	12	31	91	ITA: Gold
Una Rosa Blanca	Released: 3 December 2013; Label: Polydor, Universal; Formats: 2×CD + DVD	10	8	—	51	ITA: Gold
"—" denotes albums that did not chart or were not released

=== Side projects ===
List of albums, with selected chart positions and certifications
Title	Album details	Peak chart positions	Certifications
Title	Album details	ITA	Certifications
Walzer d'un blues	Album by Adelmo e i suoi Sorapis; Released: 1993; Label: Mercury; Formats: LP, musicassette, CD	11	ITA: Gold

== Singles ==
=== As lead singer ===
==== 1982–1990 ====
List of singles, with selected chart positions and certifications, showing year released and album name
Single	Year	Peak chart positions			Certifications	Album
Single	Year	ITA	FRA	NLD	Certifications	Album
"Una notte che vola via"	1982	—	—	—		Un po' di Zucchero
"Nuvola"	1983	—	—	—		Un po' di Zucchero
"Sandra"	1983	—	—	—		Un po' di Zucchero
"Donne" (feat. The Randy Jackson Band)	1985	21	—	—	FIMI: Gold	Zucchero & The Randy Jackson Band
"Quasi quasi" (feat. The Randy Jackson Band)	1985	—	—	—		Zucchero & The Randy Jackson Band
"Canzone triste (Canzone d'amore)"	1986	—	—	—		Rispetto
"Come il sole all'improvviso" (feat. Gino Paoli)	1986	—	—	—		Rispetto
"Rispetto"	1986	—	—	—		Rispetto
"Nella casa c'era"	1986	—	—	—		Rispetto
"Con le mani"	1987	18	—	—		Blue's
"Senza una donna"	1987	14	—	28		Blue's
"Pippo"	1987	—	—	—		Blue's
"Solo una sana e consapevole libidine salva il giovane dallo stress e dall'Azione Cattolica"	1988	—	—	—		Blue's
"Bambino yo, bambino tú (Leyenda)"	1988	—	—	—		Blue's
"Diavolo in me"	1989	—	39	—		Oro incenso e birra
"Overdose (d'amore)"	1989	—	—	—	FIMI: Gold	Oro incenso e birra
"Il mare impetuoso al tramonto salì sulla luna e dietro una tendina di stelle..."	1989	—	—	—		Oro incenso e birra
"Nice (Nietzsche) che dice"	1989	—	—	—		Oro incenso e birra
"A Wonderful World"	1989	—	—	—		Oro incenso e birra
"Diamante"	1990	—	—	18	FIMI: Platinum	Oro incenso e birra
"Madre dolcissima" / "Mama"	1990	—	—	49		Oro incenso e birra

==== 1991–2000 ====
List of singles, with selected chart positions and certifications, showing year released and album name
Single	Year	Peak chart positions										Certifications	Album
Single	Year	ITA	BEL (FL)	CAN	FRA	GER	NLD	NOR	SWE	SWI	UK	Certifications	Album
"Senza una donna (Without a Woman)" (feat. Paul Young)	1991	1	1	14	2	2	2	1	1	2	4	FIMI: Gold; SNEP: Gold; IFPI SWE: Gold	Zucchero
"Wonderful World" (feat. Eric Clapton)	1991	—	23	—	—	71	42	—	—	17	—		Zucchero
"Diamante" (feat. Randy Crawford)	1991	—	9	—	39	20	—	7	—	11	44		Zucchero
"Anytime"	1991	—	—	—	—	—	—	—	—	—	—		Live at the Kremlin
"L'urlo"	1992	—	—	—	—	—	—	—	—	—	—		Miserere
"Miserere" (feat. Luciano Pavarotti)	1992	—	24	—	37	—	41	—	—	22	15		Miserere
"Come Back the Sun"	1992	—	—	—	—	—	—	—	—	—	—		Miserere
"Un'orgia di anime perse"	1992	—	—	—	—	—	—	—	—	—	—		Miserere
"It's All Right (La promessa)"	1992	—	—	—	—	—	—	—	—	—	—		Miserere
"Povero Cristo"	1993	—	—	—	—	—	—	—	—	—	—		Miserere
"Il pelo nell'uovo"	1993	—	—	—	—	—	—	—	—	—	—		Miserere
"Chicas"	1994	—	—	—	—	—	—	—	—	—	—		Diamante
"Voodoo Voodoo"	1995	—	—	—	—	—	—	—	—	—	—		Spirito DiVino
"Papà perché"	1995	—	—	—	—	—	—	—	—	—	—		Spirito DiVino
"X colpa di chi?"	1995	20	—	—	—	—	—	—	—	—	—		Spirito DiVino
"Il volo" / "My Love"	1995	—	5	—	2	23	17	—	—	20	—		Spirito DiVino
"Pane e sale" / "Feels Like a Woman"	1995	—	—	—	22	—	—	—	—	—	—		Spirito DiVino
"Così celeste" / "She's My Baby"	1996	—	—	—	—	98	73	—	—	—	—	FIMI: Gold	Spirito DiVino
"Senza rimorso"	1996	—	—	—	—	—	—	—	—	—	—		Spirito DiVino
"Così celeste" (feat. Luciano Pavarotti)	1996	—	—	—	—	—	—	—	—	—	—		Pavarotti & Friends Together for the Children of Bosnia
"Un oceano di silenzi" (feat. Sergio Mendes)	1996	—	—	—	—	—	—	—	—	—	—		Oceano
"Menta e rosmarino" / "I Won't Be Lonely Tonight"	1996	—	—	—	50	—	92	—	—	—	—		The Best of Zucchero Sugar Fornaciari's Greatest Hits
"Niente da perdere"	1996	—	—	—	—	—	—	—	—	—	—		The Best of Zucchero Sugar Fornaciari's Greatest Hits
"Eppure non t'amo" / "I Don't Know"	1997	—	—	—	—	—	—	—	—	—	—		The Best of Zucchero Sugar Fornaciari's Greatest Hits
"Va, pensiero"	1997	10	—	—	52	—	—	17	19	—			The Best of Zucchero Sugar Fornaciari's Greatest Hits
"What Are We Waiting For" (feat. Alannah Myles)	1997	—	48	—	—	—	—	—	—	—	—		Prince Valiant (Original Soundtrack)
"Happy Birthday to Me"	1998	—	—	—	—	—	—	—	—	—	—		Widows (Original Soundtrack)
"Blu" / "Blue"	1998	6	—	—	70	—	—	—	—	35	—		BlueSugar
"Puro amore" / "If Not Tonight"	1999	—	—	—	—	—	—	—	—	—	—		BlueSugar
"You Make Me Feel Loved"	1999	—	—	—	—	—	—	—	—	—	—		BlueSugar
"Arcord"	1999	—	—	—	—	—	—	—	—	—	—		BlueSugar
"Diavolo in me" (with Nabil)	1999	—	—	—	—	—	—	—	—	—	—		Non-album single
"Va, pensiero" (feat. Sinéad O'Connor)	1999	—	—	—	—	—	—	—	—	—	—		The Best of Zucchero Sugar Fornaciari's Greatest Hits
"White Christmas"	1999	—	—	—	—	—	—	—	—	—	—		BlueSugar & WhiteChristmas
"—" denotes singles that did not chart or were not released

==== 2001–2010 ====
List of singles, with selected chart positions and certifications, showing year released and album name
Single	Year	Peak chart positions									Certifications	Album
Single	Year	ITA (FIMI)	ITA (M&D)	AUT	BEL (WA)	BEL (FL)	FRA	GER	NLD	SWI	Certifications	Album
"Baila (Sexy Thing)"	2001	1	2	—	18	23	—	97	90	3	FIMI: Platinum; IFPI SWI: Gold	Shake
"Ahum" / "I'm in Trouble"	2001	16	29	—	44	57	—	84	—	72		Shake
"Dindondio"	2002	31	—	—	56	—	—	—	—	—		Shake
"Music in Me"	2002	—	—	—	—	—	—	—	—	—		Shake
"Sento le campane"	2002	—	—	—	—	—	—	—	—	—		Shake
"Ali d'oro" / "I Lay Down" (feat. John Lee Hooker)	2002	—	—	—	—	—	—	—	91	—		Shake
"Rossa mela della sera"	2002	—	—	—	—	—	—	—	—	—		Shake
"Scintille"	2002	—	—	—	—	—	—	—	—	—		Shake
"World" (with Anggun)	2003	—	—	—	—	—	—	—	—	37		Non-album single
"Il grande Baboomba" (feat. Mousse T.)	2004	8	7	—	—	—	—	—	—	16		Zu & Co.
"Everybody's Got to Learn Sometime" / "Indaco dagli occhi del cielo" (feat. Vanessa Carlton)	2004	—	—	56	48	63	39	—	90	—		Zu & Co.
"Così Celeste" (feat. Cheb Mami)	2004	99	—	—	—	—	—	—	—	—		Zu & Co.
"Pure Love" (feat. Dolores O'Riordan)	2004	—	—	—	—	—	—	—	—	—		Zu & Co.
"Like the Sun" (feat. Macy Gray)	2005	—	—	—	—	—	—	—	—	—		Zu & Co.
"Blue" (feat. Ilse DeLange)	2005	—	—	—	—	—	—	—	10	—		Zu & Co.
"Baila Morena" (feat. Maná)	2006	—	—	—	3	—	1	—	—	10	SNEP: Gold	Zu & Co.
"Bacco perbacco"	2006	2	22	—	—	—	—	—	—	32		Fly
"Cuba libre"	2006	—	—	—	—	—	—	—	—	—		Fly
"Occhi" / "Flying Away"	2006	5	22	—	—	—	—	60	—	56	FIMI: Gold	Fly
"È delicato"	2007	35	—	—	—	—	—	—	—	—	FIMI: Gold	Fly
"Un kilo"	2007	12	22	—	—	—	—	—	—	—		Fly
"Wonderful Life"	2007	4	24	—	54	—	—	—	—	—		All the Best
"Amen"	2008	42	—	—	—	—	—	—	—	—		All the Best
"Tutti i colori della mia vita" / "I Won't Let You Down"	2008	7	—	—	—	—	—	—	—	—		All the Best
"Una carezza"	2008	4	9	—	—	—	—	—	—	—		Live in Italy
"È un peccato morir"	2010	5	2	—	—	—	—	—	—	41	FIMI: Gold	Chocabeck
"Someone Else's Tears"	2010	47	—	—	—	—	—	—	—	—		Chocabeck
"Chocabeck"	2010	38	34	—	74	43	—	—	—	—		Chocabeck
"—" denotes singles that did not chart or were not released												Chocabeck

==== 2011–present ====
List of singles, with selected chart positions and certifications, showing year released and album name
Single	Year	Peak chart positions				Certifications	Album
Single	Year	ITA (FIMI)	ITA (M&D)	BEL (WA)	SWI	Certifications	Album
"Un soffio caldo"	2011	41	25	—	—		
"Alla fine"	2011	—	—	—	—		
"Vedo nero"	2011	16	9	—	71	FIMI: Platinum	
"L'écho des dimanches" (feat. Patrick Fiori)	2011	—	—	77	—		
"Guantanamera (Guajira)"	2012	11	3	—	—	FIMI: Platinum	La sesión cubana
"Love Is All Around (Still)"	2013	—	—	—	—		La sesión cubana
"Nena"	2013	—	43	—	—		La sesión cubana
"Quale senso abbiamo noi"	2013	27	23	—	—		Una rosa blanca
"Un Zombie a la Intemperie" (with Alejandro Sanz)	2015	—	—	—	—		Sirope
"Partigiano reggiano"	2016	60	31	—	—	FIMI: Gold	Black Cat
"Voci (Voices)"	2016	—	43	157	—		Black Cat
"13 buone ragioni"	2016	—	38	—	—	FIMI: Gold	Black Cat
"Turn the World Down"	2016	—	—	—	—		Black Cat
"Ci si arrende" / "Streets of Surrender" (feat. Mark Knopfler)	2017	—	44	—	—		Black Cat
"L'anno dell'amore"	2017	—	—	—	—		Black Cat
"Un'altra storia"	2017	—	26	—	—		Wanted
"Freedom" / "My Freedom"	2019	—	—	84	—		D.O.C.
"Spirito nel buio"	2019	—	—	—	—		D.O.C.
"La canzone che se ne va"	2020	—	—	—	—		D.O.C.
"September" (with Sting)	2020	—	—	—	—		Duets
"Overdose d'amore 2024" (with Salmo)	2024	68	—	—	—		Non-album single
"—" denotes singles that did not chart or were not released

=== As featured artist ===
List of singles, with chart positions and certifications in Italy, showing year released and album name
Single	Year	Peak chart positions		Certification	Album
Single	Year	ITA (FIMI)	ITA (M&D)	Certification	Album
"Domani 21/04.09" (Artisti Uniti per l'Abruzzo)	2009	1	1	FIMI: 2× Platinum	Charity single
"A muso duro" (Italia Loves Emilia)	2012	20	16		Italia Loves Emilia – Il concerto
