= All the Best (Zucchero album) =

Compilation album by Zucchero
- Released: 23 November 2007
- Genre: Blues, R&B, soul, smooth jazz, blues rock, rock, pop rock, pop
- Length: 77:51 (1CD); 77:43 (2CD); 63:42 (American CD)
- Label: Polydor, Universal
- Producer: Don Was, Zucchero

Zucchero chronology
Fly (2006)	All the Best (2007)	Chocabeck (2010)

All the Best is a compilation album by Italian singer-songwriter Zucchero Fornaciari, released in November 2007, in celebration of the 25th anniversary of the release of his first studio album Un po' di Zucchero, released in 1983. It was promoted during Zucchero's All the Best World Tour in 2008, in its 85 concerts in Europe, Morocco, Armenia, North America, and Australia.

== Overview ==
The compilation album was released in several editions. The regular edition was released as 2CD with 35 tracks in Italy, in Europe as 1CD with 18 tracks, while in North America and iTunes as 1CD with 15 tracks. In North America it was released on January 15, 2008 by Verve Records. The Italian edition is available in some iTunes Stores. In Italy and Europe a limited edition with 2 CD and 3 DVD (video collection, bonus videos, extras) was released too.

Depending on the edition, it includes four new covers: "Wonderful Life" by Black, which was released in Italy as single (#9), "Tutti i colori della mia vita" which is "I Won't Let You Down" by Ph.D., also released as single (#7), "Amen" which is "How Could This Go Wrong" by Exile, and "You Are So Beautiful" by Billy Preston.

The compilation, especially the Italian edition (due to its vast track list), and the European edition (because it has more hits than the American one), is the most complete compilation of his most successful songs. It includes hits "Diamante" and "Il Volo", as well as collaborations "Dune Mosse" with Miles Davis, "Miserere" with Luciano Pavarotti, the cover "Everybody's Got to Learn Sometime" (Italian version "Indaco Dagli Occhi Del Cielo") feat Vanessa Carlton and Haylie Ecker, "Ali D'Oro" feat John Lee Hooker, and "Senza Una Donna (Without A Woman)" feat Paul Young.

A 2CD limited edition All The Best + Zu & Co. was released in 2014, promoting the Night of the Proms concerts.

== Reception ==
All About Jazz praised the American 15-tracks edition in its review, remarking that "perhaps no other recording artist in the world has recorded as many successful – and diverse – collaborations", the songs are a successful mixture of blues, soul, gospel and Italian melodies. All Jazz concluded: "never one to rest on his laurels, Zucchero continues to seek the recognition in the United States that he enjoys in the rest of the world".

== Track listing ==
=== Italian Double CD ===
Disc 1

No.	Title	Length
1.	"Nel Cosi' Blu"	4:28
2.	"Tutti I Colori Della Mia Vita"	4:04
3.	"Wonderful Life"	5:09
4.	"Occhi"	3:39
5.	"Indaco Dagli Occhi Del Cielo"	3:58
6.	"Il Volo"	4:20
7.	"Baila (Sexy Thing)"	4:06
8.	"Bacco Perbacco"	3:43
9.	"Diamante"	5:50
10.	"Cosi' Celeste"	4:51
11.	"Un Kilo"	3:31
12.	"Amen"	4:02
13.	"Menta E Rosmarino"	5:22
14.	"Blu"	5:47
15.	"Con Le Mani"	4:42
16.	"Solo Una Sana (E Consapevole Libidine Salve Il Giovane Dallo Stress E Dall'Azione Cattolica!)"	2:54
17.	"Diavolo In Me"	4:07
18.	"You Are So Beautiful"	2:56

Disc 2

No.	Title	Length
1.	"Overdose (D'Amore)"	5:22
2.	"Il Mare (Impetuoso Al Tramonto Sali'Sulla Luna E Dietro Una Tendina Di Stelle...)"	3:56
3.	"Dune Mosse" (feat Miles Davis)	5:43
4.	"Senza Una Donna"	4:27
5.	"Donne"	3:23
6.	"Ridammi Il Sole"	4:05
7.	"Rispetto"	4:19
8.	"Pane E Sale"	3:58
9.	"Ahum"	4:44
10.	"Non Ti Sopporto Piu"	4:22
11.	"Hey Man"	4:17
12.	"It's All Right (La Promessa)"	5:16
13.	"Va, Pensiero"	4:09
14.	"Pippo"	4:35
15.	"X Colpa Di Chi?"	3:14
16.	"Miserere" (feat Luciano Pavarotti)	4:13
17.	"Madre Dolcissima"	7:09

=== European CD ===
No.	Title	Length
1.	"Wonderful Life"	5:09
2.	"I Won't Let You Down"	4:05
3.	"Senza Una Donna (Without A Woman)" (feat Paul Young)	4:27
4.	"Baila (Sexy Thing)"	4:07
5.	"Everybody's Got To Learn Sometime" (feat Vanessa Carlton and Haylie Ecker)	4:00
6.	"Nel Cosi Blu"	4:26
7.	"Il Volo"	4:17
8.	"Bacco Perbacco"	3:44
9.	"Occhi"	3:38
10.	"Cosi Celeste"	4:50
11.	"Blue" (English version)	4:30
12.	"Diavolo In Me"	4:06
13.	"Dune Mosse" (feat Miles Davis)	5:39
14.	"Diamante"	5:47
15.	"Va, Pensiero"	3:51
16.	"Amen"	4:01
17.	"Miserere" (feat Luciano Pavarotti)	4:13
18.	"You Are So Beautiful"	2:56

=== American CD ===
No.	Title	Length
1.	"Wonderful Life"	5:09
2.	"I Won't Let You Down"	4:05
3.	"Senza Una Donna" (remastered 2007)	4:27
4.	"Baila (Sexy Thing)" (remastered 2007)	4:07
5.	"Everybody's Got To Learn Sometime" (feat Haylie Ecker)	4:00
6.	"Nel Cosi'Blu"	4:26
7.	"Bacco Perbacco"	3:44
8.	"Un Kilo"	3:31
9.	"Dune Mosse" (feat Miles Davis)	5:43
10.	"Ali D'Oro" (feat John Lee Hooker)	4:55
11.	"Il Volo" (remastered 2007)	4:17
12.	"Diavolo In Me" (remastered 2007)	4:05
13.	"Amen"	4:01
14.	"Miserere" (feat Luciano Pavarotti)	4:13
15.	"You Are So Beautiful"	2:56

== Charts and certifications ==
Chart (2007)	Peak position
Austrian Albums Chart	6
Belgian Albums Chart	50
Dutch Albums Chart	64
French Albums Chart	28
German Albums Chart	16
Italian Albums Chart	1
Swiss Albums Chart	2

Region	Certification	Certified units/sales
Germany (BVMI)	Gold	100,000^{^}
Italy (FIMI)	Diamond	400,000^{*}
Switzerland (IFPI Switzerland)	Platinum	30,000^{^}
^{*} Sales figures based on certification alone.^{^} Shipments figures based on certification alone.
