= Zucchero (album) =

Compilation album by Zucchero Fornaciari
- Released: 1990
- Label: London
- Producer: Corrado Rustici

Zucchero Fornaciari chronology
Oro Incenso & Birra (1989)	Zucchero (1990)	Zucchero Live at the Kremlin (1991)

Zucchero is a compilation album by Italian singer, musician and songwriter Zucchero Fornaciari (often known by the mononym Zucchero), originally released in 1990 by London Records. It contains selected tracks from his then most recent two studio albums Blue's (1987) and Oro Incenso & Birra (1989), some of those tracks in their original Italian language form and some re-recorded with English lyrics, including a new version of "Senza una donna", featuring Paul Young.

Though a popular singer throughout Europe, this is Zucchero's only charting album in the UK Albums Chart to date, its 1991 release in the UK following shortly after his only top 10 single there with "Senza una donna (Without a Woman)", featuring Young.

== Critical reception ==
In a positive review of the compilation for AllMusic, contributing musician Eric Clapton's guitar playing on the track "Wonderful World" was described as "[heightening] the profile of this release", but that it's "Zucchero's songwriting and emotive voice that really captivate", concluding that "[the] album alternates songs in Italian with songs in English, making the artist's music all the more diverse and accessible."

== Track listing ==
No.	Title	Writer(s)	Origin	Length
1.	"Diamante"	Zucchero; Frank Musker; Francesco De Gregori	Oro Incenso & Birra (1989)	5:50
2.	"Wonderful World" (featuring Eric Clapton)	Zucchero; Musker	Oro Incenso & Birra	4:34
3.	"Il mare"	Zucchero	Oro Incenso & Birra	3:57
4.	"Mama"	Zucchero; Musker	Oro Incenso & Birra (Italian language version)	7:17
5.	"Dunes of Mercy"	Zucchero; Musker	Blue's (1987; Italian language version)	5:39
6.	"Senza una donna (Without a Woman)" (featuring Paul Young)	Zucchero; Musker	new track (Italian language solo version on Blue's)	4:29
7.	"You're Losing Me"	Zucchero; Musker	Oro Incenso & Birra (Italian language version)	5:48
8.	"Solo Una Sana"	Zucchero	Blue's	4:52
9.	"You've Chosen Me"	Zucchero; Musker	Blue's (Italian language version)	2:30
10.	"Diavolo in Me"	Zucchero	Oro Incenso & Birra	4:03
11.	"Overdose (d'Amore)"	Zucchero	Oro Incenso & Birra	5:17
12.	"Nice (Nietzsche) Che Dice"	Zucchero	Oro Incenso & Birra	3:21

Note

- Some versions of the compilation include track 1, "Diamante", as a duet with Randy Crawford.

== Personnel ==
Adapted from the Zucchero liner notes.

=== Musicians ===
Listed in the liner notes are the following additional musicians, without stating their specific contribution. Instruments sourced from corresponding studio albums where known.

- J. Blackfoot – backing vocals (Blues and Oro Incenso & Birra tracks)
- Eric Clapton – featured guitar ("Wonderful World")
- Clarence Clemons – tenor saxophone (Blue's and Oro Incenso & Birra tracks)
- Aida Cooper – backing vocals (Blue's tracks)
- Eric Daniel – soprano saxophone (Blue's tracks)
- Giorgio Francis – electro acoustic drums (Blue's and Oro Incenso & Birra tracks)
- Lisa Hunt – backing vocals (Oro Incenso & Birra tracks)
- Rosario Jermano – percussion (Blue's and Oro Incenso & Birra tracks)
- Polo Jones – bass guitar (Blue's and Oro Incenso & Birra tracks)
- The Memphis Horns (Blue's and Oro Incenso & Birra tracks)
  - Wayne Jackson – trumpet, trombone, piccolo trumpet
  - Andrew Love – saxophone
- Arthur Miles – backing vocals (Blue's and Oro Incenso & Birra tracks)
- "Nonna" Amelia Monari – backing vocals (Oro Incenso & Birra tracks)
- Ennio Morricone (Oro Incenso & Birra tracks)
- Simona Pirone – backing vocals (Blue's and Oro Incenso & Birratracks)
- Corrado Rustici – electric guitar, computer programming, horn arrangement (Blue's and Oro Incenso & Birra tracks)
- David Sancious – keyboards, Hammond organ (Blue's and Oro Incenso & Birra tracks)
- Jimmy Smith – Hammond organ ("Overdose (d'Amore)")
- James Taylor Q. – Hammond organ ("Nice (Nietzsche) Che Dice", "Il Mare")
- Mory Thioune – backing vocals (Oro Incenso & Birra tracks)
- Rufus Thomas – vocal introduction ("Overdose (d'Amore)")
- James Thompson – backing vocals (Blue's and Oro Incenso & Birra tracks)
- Fanta Toure – backing vocals (Oro Incenso & Birra tracks)
- Ruby Wilson – backing vocals (Oro Incenso & Birra tracks)
- Paul Young – featured vocals ("Senza una donna (Without a Woman)")

Ardent Gospel Choir (Oro Incenso & Birra tracks)

- Lester Snell – director
- Homer Banks
- Fawn Belcher
- J. Blackfoot
- Bertram Brown
- William Brown
- Pat Cole
- Kennett Davis
- Lavestia Gaston
- Ann Hines
- Eartha Nesby
- Ella Payne
- Gloria Robinson
- Pat Snell
- Deborah Swiney
- Sheri Walls
- Ruby Wilson

=== Technical ===
- Corrado Rustici – producer & arranger
- Michael Torpendine – executive producer
- Gordon Lyon – engineer
- Terry O'Neil – front cover photography
- Giacomo de Simone – live photography
- Giuseppe D'Angelo – booklet photography
- Fabrizio Gatta – booklet photography
- Stylorouge – design

== Charts ==
Chart performance for Zucchero
Chart (1991)	Peak position
Dutch Albums (Album Top 100)	13
Europe (Eurochart Top 100)	16
France (SNEP)	6
German Albums (Offizielle Top 100)	9
Norwegian Albums (VG-lista)	3
Swedish Albums (Sverigetopplistan)	20
Swiss Albums (Schweizer Hitparade)	7
UK Albums (Official Charts)	29

== Certifications ==
Region	Certification	Certified units/sales
France (SNEP)	Gold	100,000^{*}
Switzerland (IFPI Switzerland)	Platinum	50,000^{^}
United Kingdom	—	50,000
^{‡} Sales+streaming figures based on certification alone.
