= Black Cat (Zucchero album) =

Studio album by Zucchero
- Released: April 29, 2016
- Genre: Blues rock
- Label: Universal
- Producers: T Bone Burnett, Brendan O'Brien, Don Was

Zucchero chronology
Una Rosa Blanca (2013)	Black Cat (2016)	Studio Vinyl Collection (2016)

Singles from Black Cat
- 1. "Partigiano Reggiano" Released: March 24, 2016; 2. "Voci (Namanama Version)" Released: March 25, 2016; 3. "13 buone ragioni" Released: June 17, 2016; 4. "Turn The World Down" Released: June 17, 2016; 5. "Ci si arrende" Released: January 6, 2017

Black Cat is the thirteenth studio album by the Italian blues rock singer-songwriter Zucchero Fornaciari, released on 29 April 2016. It's his first full-length studio album in six years, after Chocabeck in 2010, given that La Sesión Cubana (2012) was a mix of unreleased, previously released and cover songs.

== Overview ==
The album is marked by music which goes back to soul & blues roots and the sound of the famous Oro Incenso & Birra (1989). According to Zucchero, the album does not have the meaning of Western prejudice of black cat, yet Afro-American for "figure of speech, a greeting, a symbol of auspice". As well there is a component of anarchism toward the "market rules". It is his "darkest album and rough ever in terms of sonority".

On CNN it was announced that the album would have included a new song "Streets of Surrender (S.O.S)" with lyrics written by Bono, dedicated to the victims of November 2015 Paris attacks. Mark Knopfler from Dire Straits is a special guest and guitarist on the song, as well "Ci si arrende". The single "Voci" is sampled by "Ignorant Boy, Beautiful Girl" by Loney, Dear, while "Ten More Days" is a cover by Avicii.

The album's English version includes a collaboration with Elvis Costello on "Love Again" (originally "Turn the World Down"), a Spanish version collaboration with Alejandro Sanz on "Fatti di sogni" (renamed as "Hechos de sueños"), while on Japanese version guitarist Tomoyasu Hotei played on "Ti voglio sposare".

The album was presented at the record-breaking 11 consecutive concerts at the Arena in Verona in September 2016, and following the Black Cat World Tour. The Arena concerts, held between 16 and 28 September, were the only concerts in Italy in that year, and were special events with vast and diverse repertoire of old and new songs, and diverse special guests. With 11 more concerts at the Arena in 2017, Zucchero broke his own record, ending with three residencies and 22 concerts in one year in that location.

== Composition ==
Zucchero recounts that the album was "born" during the tour in Southern parts of United States (2013). He played in cities like New Orleans, Nashville, Lafayette, and immersed himself in their blues sounds, with guitars played with bottlenecks. He wanted to reproduce sounds from films like 12 Years a Slave and Django Unchained.

He wrote the songs like in the early days when everything was simpler as didn't have nothing to lose, and didn't care about the logic of the market. He intended to have different "dress" for each song, thus entrusted seven different songs to each of album producers T Bone Burnett, Brendan O'Brien, Don Was, of which twelve were chosen. The songs show "social obligation", and few gospel songs lyrics talk about "new slaves": the migrants.

In the single Partigiano Reggiano (Partisan from Reggio) a verse sings Bella ciao. Although the Reggio Emilia province was "red", and his uncle during World War II was deported to Germany, he "speak not of right or left, but someone who has ideals and that is ready to make wall against what does not work".

== Release ==
The album was released on 29 April 2016 by Universal, in CD, standard vinyl and limited edition red vinyl. It was released in three different versions; Italian, International (with English and Spanish version), Japanese. The song "Partigiano Reggiano" is album's first single in Italy, released 24 March, while "Voci (Namanama Version)" the album's first single internationally, released 25 March.

== Track listing ==
All tracks are written by Zucchero Fornaciari, except where noted.

No.	Title	Lyrics	Music	Length
1.	"Partigiano reggiano"
2.	"13 buone ragioni"
3.	"Ti voglio sposare"
4.	"Ci si arrende" (feat. Mark Knopfler)
5.	"Ten More Days"	Avicii, Simon Aldred	Avicii, Simon Aldred
6.	"L'anno dell'amore"	Zucchero, D. M. Troiano, H. Sullivan, R. Kenner, P. Glan J., P. Panella	Zucchero, D. M. Troiano, H. Sullivan, R. Kenner, P. Glan J.
7.	"Hey Lord"
8.	"Fatti di sogni"
9.	"La tortura della luna"		Zucchero, N. Ruzicka, S. Ioannou
10.	"Love Again"
11.	"Terra incognita"
12.	"Voci (Namanama Version)"		Loney, Dear, Zucchero
13.	"Streets of Surrender (S.O.S)" (feat. Mark Knopfler)	Bono, S. Carmody

== Charts ==
=== Weekly charts ===
Chart (2016)	Peak position
Argentine Albums (CAPIF)	4
Austrian Albums (Ö3 Austria)	2
Belgian Albums (Ultratop Flanders)	33
Belgian Albums (Ultratop Wallonia)	27
Czech Albums (ČNS IFPI)	17
Croatian International Albums (HDU)	36
Dutch Albums (Album Top 100)	24
German Albums (Offizielle Top 100)	13
French Albums (SNEP)	51
US World Albums	9
Italian Albums (FIMI)	1
Swiss Albums (Schweizer Hitparade)	1

=== Year-end charts ===
Chart (2016)	Position
Austrian Albums (Ö3 Austria)	29
Belgian Albums (Ultratop Wallonia)	148
Swiss Albums (Schweizer Hitparade)	11
Italian Albums (FIMI)	9
Chart (2017)	Position
Italian Albums (FIMI)	71

== Certifications ==
Region	Certification	Certified units/sales
Austria (IFPI Austria)	Gold	7,500^{*}
Switzerland (IFPI Switzerland)	Gold	10,000^{^}
Italy (FIMI)	2× Platinum	100,000^{*}
^{*} Sales figures based on certification alone.^{^} Shipments figures based on certification alone.
