= Zu & Co live at the Royal Albert Hall =

Zu & Co Live at the Royal Albert Hall

Video by Zucchero
- Released: 2004
- Recorded: May 6, 2004, Royal Albert Hall
- Genre: Blues rock, Pop rock

Zu & Co. Live at the Royal Albert Hall is a live DVD recording by Italian blues rock singer-songwriter Zucchero Fornaciari.

In 2005 it was certified Gold in Switzerland.

== Track listing ==
No.	Title	Length
1.	"Dune Mosse" (with Miles Davis)	5:49
2.	"Dindondio"	4:44
3.	"Rossa Mela della Sera"	5:36
4.	"Il Grande Boomba" (with Mousse T)	4:17
5.	"Like the Sun (From Out of Nowhere)" (with Irene Fornaciari)	3:56
6.	"Everybody’s Got to Learn Sometimes" (with Jenny Bae)	5:02
7.	"I’m in Trouble" (with Tina Arena)	5:20
8.	"Baila morena" (with Fher Olvera from Maná)	4:30
9.	"Ali D’Oro" (with John Lee Hooker)	5:59
10.	"Senza una Donna (Without a Woman)" (with Paul Young)	5:16
11.	"Pure Love" (with Dolores O’Riordan)	4:15
12.	"Diavolo in Me (A Devil in Me)" (with Solomon Burke)	6:04
13.	"Il Volo (The Flight)" (with Ronan Keating)	5:51
14.	"Così Celeste" (with Cheb Mami)	6:10
15.	"Madre Dolcissima" (with Brian May)	7:50
16.	"Il Mare Impetuoso al Tramonto Salì sulla Luna e Dietro una Tendina di Stelle…" (with Brian May)	4:50
17.	"Hey Man" (with Eric Clapton)	4:55
18.	"A Wonderful World" (with Eric Clapton)	5:39
19.	"Miserere" (with Luciano Pavarotti)	6:41
20.	"Solo una Sana e Consapevole Libidine Salva il Giovane dallo Stress e dall’Azione Cattolica…"
21.	"Shake"	4:45
22.	"Diamante"	6:27
23.	"X Colpa Di Chi?"	6:18
24.	"Hai Scelto Me"	4:57
