= Love for All Seasons =

Love for All Seasons or A Love for All Seasons may refer to:

== Music ==
- "Love for All Seasons" (Christina Aguilera song), a song by Christina Aguilera from her 1999 debut album
- "Love for All Seasons", a 1992 single by Right Said Fred
- Love for All Seasons, a 1996 album by J.C. Lodge
- "A Love for All Seasons", a 1967 single by The Arbors
- A Love for All Seasons, a 1991 album by Arthur Miles (born 1949)

== Film ==
- Love for All Seasons (film), a 2003 Hong Kong romantic comedy film
- Love for All Seasons (2016 film), a 2016 American film starring Chachi Gonzales
