= Arthur Miles (musician, born 1949) =

American jazz musician (1949–2024)

Arthur Miles (November 14, 1949 – July 31, 2024) was an American blues, jazz, and R&B musician, based in Italy.

== Early life ==
Miles was born in Indiana but moved to California at a very young age, where he started his career as a singer in Richmond, San Francisco. The influence of the music of his uncle, the great guitarist Wes Montgomery, and his father's night club "Arthur's" allowed him to observe, absorb, and jam with some of the most famous blues, jazz and soul artists of the time, playing an important part in his musical education.

== Career ==
From the age of 14, Miles played as a professional musician with his own bands. He perfected his singing technique at the School of Natural Voice at Los Angeles tutored by Patricia Warner, and contemporarily completed his formal studies in musical theory. He also majored in journalism at the Pasadena City College. While in Los Angeles his bands included The Curb Feelers, Good Clean Fun, Hardworking, and The Blues Shakers. In 1974 he spent several years in Japan, touring the entire country and performing in the principal cities with the Days Band.

Miles subsequently worked as both an individual artist and vocalist supporting musicians such as Edwin Starr, José Feliciano, Big Joe Turner, Johnny Otis, Eddie Vinson and Jimmy "Bo" Horne. He toured with The Blues Society performing all over California.

In 1984, Miles moved to Italy. He started working with many Italian artists, including Paolo Conte, Loredana Bertè, Pierangelo Bertoli, and Andrea Mingardi. He participated in the festivals Carnevale di Venezia and Umbria Jazz Festival, and has made appearances in television shows such as Festivalbar, Torno Sabato, Domenica In, La Bella e la Bestia, Nonsolomoda, and Cantagiro.

Following a gig at the Scimmie Jazz Club in Milan, he was invited by Renzo Arbore to participate in his popular TV show Quelli della notte on Rai 2. His voice interpreted the Frank Raya Band hit "Eyah! Eyah!" featured on the album The King of Money.

In 1987, Miles began to work with Zucchero, singing on his records Blue's, Oro incenso e birra, Spirito Divino and Shake. His is the Reverend's introduction in "Diavolo im me" ("Devil In Me"). Zucchero's most successful hits like "Senza una donna" ("Without a Woman"), "Hey Man", "Baila", "Ahum" include Miles' participation. He also performed in Zucchero's LP Fly, released in September 2006, which includes the single "Bacco perbacco". He also participated in the album Black Cat released in 2016.

In 1990, he toured with Gloria Gaynor in Italy, and re-recorded "I Will Survive" and "This Love Affair" with her.

== Later life and death ==
Miles lived in Orsenigo, Como and was an active musician. Between 2021 and 2022, he took part in the Italian edition of The Voice Senior.

Miles died on July 31, 2024, at the age of 74.

== Discography ==
=== Albums ===
- 1991 – A Love for All Seasons (New Music)
- 1998 – Arthur Miles Faces the Blues (Tring-Azzurra Records)
- 1998 – Arthur Miles and the Blues Shakers (Independent)**
- 2006 – Trust (Independent)
- 2006 – Flow (Independent)
- 2006 – Blue Boy (AIPS Assomusica)
- 2006 – Love and Joy (Independent)
- 2010 – Blue Avenue (Blue Avenue Productions)
- 2012 – Living the Blues (Delta Video)
- 2012 – Live – Arthur Miles and Giorgio Khawam Band (Blue Avenue Productions)
- 2013 – Emotions of Love (Blue Avenue Productions)
- 2018 – My Time for Love (Blue Avenue Productions)
- 2018 – Language of Love (Blue Avenue Productions)

=== Singles ===
- "Ride on the Power" (Flying Records)
- "We All Need Love" (New Music)
- "Baby I Need Your Loving/She's Back" (New Music)
- "Never Give Up On" (TBA/Flying Records UK)
- "Sunshine Day" (@rt Records)
- "Talking That Trash" (Dance Factory/EMI Music)
- "Be Thankful for What You Got)" (UMD Records/Dig It Int'l)
- "Everybody's Talking" (Dance Factory/EMI Music)
- "Let Your Body" (Sunlite Records/Time srl)
- "Living in Love" (UPD Records)
- "Oh Woman" (Sony Music / Dance Pool)
- "Gimme Your?" (Lupomannaro/Disco Magic)
- "Italy's Finest" (New Music)
- "Don't Listen to Your Heart/Wild" (World New Music)
- "Tripping on Your Love" (New Music/Carrere Records)
- "Move and Groove Your Body" (New Music)
- "Never Stop the Action" (Expanded Music)
- "Hey Mr. DJ" (New Music)
- "Trippin' on Your Love / Helping Hand" (New Music)
- "Rhythm Machine" (Disco Magic)
- "Jivetime Girl" (New Music)
- "I Believe" (Disco Magic)
- "Forever and Two Days/I'm Not in Love" (New Music)
- "You're My Woman" (Flying Records/UMM)
- "Back Away" (D-Division)
- "Victims of Our Love" (New Music)
- "Helping Hand" (FFRR/London Records)
- "We Got a Love" (Disco Holidays Records)
- "You Wanna Get Down" (Sounds Good)
- "Good Times Bad Times" (Blue Avenue Productions)
- "Stronger" (Blue Avenue Productions)
- "Girl You'll Be a Woman Soon" (Independent)
- "You Got Me" (Blue Avenue Productions)
- "Our Love Song" (Blue Avenue Productions)
- "Another Deep End" (Blue Avenue Productions)
- "Build My World Around You" (Blue Avenue Productions)
- "Don't Give It to Another" (Blue Avenue Productions)
- "Handle It Easy" (Blue Avenue Productions)
- "If Ever a Teardrop Falls" (Blue Avenue Productions)
- "Heal The Planet" (Blue Avenue Productions)
- "Let's Get to It" (Blue Avenue Productions)
- "A Girl Like You" (Blue Avenue Productions)
- "I Gotta Feelin'" (Blue Avenue Productions)
- "Come si fa" (Independent)
- "Baila Sexy Thing" (Blue Avenue Productions)
- "It's Got to Stop" (Auditoria Records)

== Other sources ==
- Soul and Jazz Plus - Anno 2 Numero 4 - Estate 1996 - Associazione Culturale Soul & Jazz Society Bologna
- The Disco to House Music Daily Update - ARTHUR MILES : WHEN THE BLUES HITS THE GROOVE
