= Jenny Bae =

Jenny Bae may refer to:

- Jenny Bae (violinist) (born 1980), South Korean violinist
- Jenny Bae (golfer) (born 2001), American golfer
