= Zu & Co. =

Compilation album by Zucchero
- Released: May 14, 2004
- Genres: Pop, rock
- Length: 76:58
- Labels: Polydor Records, Universal
- Producers: Toby Baker, Simon Climie, Corrado Rustici, Zucchero

Zucchero chronology
| Shake (2001) | Zu & Co. (2004) | Fly (2006) |

Professional ratings
Review scores
| Source | Rating |
|---|---|
| AllMusic | 4/5 stars |
| Q | 3/5 stars |
| PopMatters | 6/10 stars |

Zu & Co. is a compilation album by Italian blues rock singer-songwriter Zucchero Fornaciari released in 2004. With the exception of "Indaco Dagli occhi Del Cielo" (a cover of the Korgis song "Everybody's Got to Learn Sometime") and "Il Grande Baboomba", all songs have previously been recorded and released by Zucchero. For "Zu & Co." new versions of these songs were recorded with a selection of artists with whom Zucchero has performed during his career. It has been released in several editions, Italian, Spanish, French (including duet with Johnny Hallyday), Australian, Latin American, and International. The album has sold over a million copies worldwide and was one of the rare Italian albums which managed to enter the Billboard 200 (#84) chart, after its release in the United States in the summer of 2005 in partnership with the Starbucks Hear Music label and Concord Records. It topped the Billboards World Albums chart, where it charted for 27 weeks.

A special concert with guests was held to present the album at the Royal Albert Hall in London, which was recorded and released as Zu & Co live at the Royal Albert Hall. The show was also recorded by TV networks. In December 2005 a limited edition box set titled Zu & Co. - The Ultimate Duets Collection was released, with regular CD and DVD, and an additional third disc with 12 more duets, including "Mama" feat Stevie Ray Vaughan, "Io vivo (in te)" feat Bryan Adams, "Diamante" feat Randy Crawford, "Before you accuse me" feat Buddy Guy, and "Va, pensiero" feat Sinéad O'Connor.

== Track listing ==
Italian edition

1. "Dune Mosse" (with Miles Davis) – 5:44
2. "Muoio Per Te" (with Sting) – 3:23
3. "Indaco Dagli Occhi Del Cielo" (with Vanessa Carlton, feat. Haylie Ecker) – 4:03
4. "Il Grande Baboomba" (with Mousse T) – 3:20
5. "Like The Sun (From Out Of Nowhere)" (with Macy Gray, feat. Jeff Beck) – 3:56
6. "Baila morena" (with Maná) – 4:06
7. "Ali D'Oro" (with John Lee Hooker) – 4:57
8. "Blue" (lyrics by Bono; with Sheryl Crow or Ilse DeLange) – 4:48
9. "Pure Love" (with Dolores O'Riordan) – 3:28
10. "A Wonderful World" (with Eric Clapton) – 4:35
11. "Pippo (Nasty Guy)" (with Tom Jones) – 3:16
12. "Hey Man (Sing A Song)" (with B. B. King) – 4:37
13. "Il Volo (The Flight)" (with Ronan Keating) – 4:48
14. "Così Celeste (with Cheb Mami) – 4:42
15. "Diavolo In Me (A Devil In Me)" (with Solomon Burke) – 4:00
16. "Senza Una Donna (Without A Woman)" (with Paul Young) – 4:30
17. "Il Mare Impetuoso Al Tramonto Salì Sulla Luna E Dietro Una Tendina Di Stelle..." (with Brian May) – 4:05
18. "Miserere" (with Luciano Pavarotti & Andrea Bocelli) – 4:14

== Charts ==
=== Weekly charts ===
| Chart (2004–2006) | Peak position |
|---|---|
| Argentina Albums Chart | 14 |
| Austrian Albums Chart | 1 |
| Belgian Albums Chart (Flanders) | 26 |
| Belgian Albums Chart (Wallonia) | 1 |
| Dutch Albums Chart | 14 |
| European Albums | 5 |
| French Albums Chart | 11 |
| German Albums Chart | 4 |
| Greek Albums (IFPI) | 2 |
| Italian Albums Chart | 1 |
| Portuguese Albums Chart | 30 |
| Spanish Albums Chart | 27 |
| Swiss Albums Chart | 1 |
| World Albums Chart | 1 |
| US Billboard Top 200 | 84 |

=== Year-end charts ===
| Chart (2004) | Position |
|---|---|
| Austrian Albums (Ö3 Austria) | 9 |
| Belgian Albums Chart (Wallonia) | 40 |
| Dutch Albums (MegaCharts) | 76 |
| French Albums (SNEP) | 89 |
| German Albums (Offizielle Top 100) | 41 |
| Italian Albums (FIMI) | 11 |
| Swiss Albums (Schweizer Hitparade) | 4 |
| Chart (2005) | Position |
| Italian Albums (FIMI) | 54 |

== Certifications ==
| Region | Certification | Certified units/sales |
|---|---|---|
| Austria (IFPI Austria) | Platinum | 30,000^{*} |
| France (SNEP) | Gold | 186,100 |
| Germany (BVMI) | 3× Gold | 300,000^{‡} |
| Italy (FIMI) | Diamond | 500,000^{*} |
| Switzerland (IFPI Switzerland) | 2× Platinum | 80,000^{^} |
Summaries
| Europe (IFPI) | Platinum | 1,000,000^{*} |
^{*} Sales figures based on certification alone.^{^} Shipments figures based on certification alone.^{‡} Sales+streaming figures based on certification alone.
