= Loney Dear (album) =

Studio album by Loney, Dear
- Released: 27 September 2017
- Length: 36:22
- Label: Real World

Loney, Dear chronology
Hall Music (2011)	Loney Dear (2017)

Professional ratings
Aggregate scores
Source	Rating
Metacritic	69/100
Review scores
Source	Rating
AllMusic	3.5/5 stars
The Independent	4/5 stars
Under the Radar	8/10

Loney Dear is a self-titled sixth studio album by Swedish singer-songwriter Loney, Dear. It was released 29 September 2017 through Real World Records.

== Track listing ==
No.	Title	Length
1.	"Pun"	3:27
2.	"Humbug"	3:24
3.	"Hulls"	4:03
4.	"Sum"	3:58
5.	"Lilies"	3:34
6.	"Little Jacket"	3:09
7.	"Isn't It You?"	3:19
8.	"Dark Light"	3:40
9.	"Harbours/Harbors"	4:35
10.	"There Are Several Alberts Here"	3:13

== Charts ==
Chart	Peak position
Swedish Albums (Sverigetopplistan)	53
