= Loney, Noir =

Studio album by Loney, Dear
- Released: 2005; February 6, 2007 (U.S. re-issue)
- Genre: Indie pop
- Label: Sub Pop

Loney, Dear chronology
Sologne (2005)	Loney, Noir (2005)	Dear John (2009)

Professional ratings
Review scores
Source	Rating
Allmusic	link
Drowned in Sound	(8/10) link
Pitchfork Media	(6.6/10) link
PopMatters	(8/10) link
The Wheel's Still in Spin	(not rated) link

Loney, Noir is the fourth album, but first major release, by Swedish indie pop artist Loney, Dear. In the United States, it was released on the Sub Pop label on February 6, 2007.

== Track listing ==
1. "Sinister in a State of Hope"
2. "I Am John"
3. "Saturday Waits"
4. "Hard Days 1.2.3.4"
5. "I Am the Odd One"
6. "No One Can Win"
7. "I Will Call You Lover Again"
8. "Carrying a Stone"
9. "The Meter Marks OK"
10. "And I Won't Cause Anything at All"
