= Shake (Zucchero album) =

Studio album by Zucchero
- Released: 14 September 2001
- Recorded: March – May 2001
- Studios: The Plan Studios, Hollywood; Umbi Studio, Italy
- Genres: Blues rock, pop rock
- Length: 47:56
- Label: Polydor/Universal
- Producer: Corrado Rustici

Zucchero chronology
Overdose d'amore/The Ballads (1999)	Shake (2001)	Zu & Co. (2004)

Singles from Shake
- 1. "Baila (Sexy Things)" Released: June 22, 2001; 2. "Ahum" Released: September 21, 2001; 3. "Dindondio" Released: January 25, 2002; 4. "Sento le campane" Released: April 27, 2002; 5. "Rossa mela della sera" Released: September 13, 2002

Shake is the ninth studio album by the Italian blues rock singer-songwriter Zucchero Fornaciari, released on 14 September 2001. The album was mostly recorded in 2001 at The Plan Studios in Hollywood with producer Corrado Rustici, and previewed near Rovigo, on 9 September 2001. It was the last produced by Rustici.

== Overview ==
In this album, Zucchero used the technique of sampling. Starting from an old collection of vinyls owned by his American programmer, Zucchero tried to recreate a vintage and blues sound by taking some portions of sound recordings and reusing them as new instruments. He borrowed the idea from other important albums, such as Play (1999) by Moby or works by Fatboy Slim.

== Composition ==
The album opens with three blues rock songs. "Sento le campane" whose music is by Zucchero, Isaac Hayes and David Porter, "Music In Me" and "Porca l'oca". The latter sampled "What'd I Say" by Ray Charles, who also recorded the song together with Zucchero. The fourth song, "Ali d'oro", represents the last recording of John Lee Hooker's career. The American bluesman sings the chorus "I lay down with an angel". The music, typical of a blues ballad, is composed by Zucchero and Luciano Luisi. "Ahum" is co-written with the friend and old colleague Roberto Zanetti, as well as "Music In Me" and "Baila (Sexy Things)", and sampled Barry White's version of "Just the Way You Are". "Scintille" sampled from "Deceiving Blues" by Teddy Darby and "Feelin' Lowdown" by Big Bill Broonzy. "Baila (Sexy Things)", released as the first single in Italy, is the core of the selling success of the entire album, peaking at number 1 in Italy, France and Spain. For the composition, Zucchero sampled "Take Me to the River" by Al Green and "Mannish Boy" by Muddy Waters. The next two ballads "Dindondio", whose theme is the countryside life, and "Rossa mela della sera" sampled the choir "Oh! Death Where Is Thy Sting?" and "Choladas" by M. Vivanco, respectively. After the rock title track, the last song "Tobia", whose lyrics are by the songwriter Francesco De Gregori, is dedicated to Zucchero's lost dog. The album topped the chart of Italy (for four weeks) and Switzerland (for three weeks) and appeared in the charts of Netherlands, France, Belgium, Spain, Germany, Mexico, Argentina and Austria.

== Track listing ==
All tracks are written by Zucchero Fornaciari, except where noted.

Italian edition
No.	Title	Lyrics	Music	Length
1.	"Sento le campane"		Zucchero, Isaac Hayes & David Porter	3:26
2.	"Music In Me"		Zucchero, Robyx	3:21
3.	"Porca l'oca"			3:28
4.	"Ali d'oro"		Zucchero, Luciano Luisi	4:57
5.	"Ahum"		Zucchero, Robyx	4:44
6.	"Scintille"			5:15
7.	"Baila (Sexy Thing)"	Zucchero, Robyx	Zucchero, Robyx	3:57
8.	"Dindondio"	Zucchero, Pasquale Panella		4:37
9.	"Rossa mela della sera"	Zucchero, Pasquale Panella		5:05
10.	"Shake"			3:55
11.	"Tobia"	Zucchero, Francesco De Gregori	Zucchero, Luciano Luisi	4:58

== Charts ==
=== Weekly charts ===
Chart (2001)	Peak position
Austrian Albums (Ö3 Austria)	16
Belgian Albums (Ultratop Flanders)	39
Belgian Albums (Ultratop Wallonia)	22
Dutch Albums (Album Top 100)	67
French Albums (SNEP)	40
German Albums (Offizielle Top 100)	25
Italian Albums (FIMI)	1
Swiss Albums (Schweizer Hitparade)	1

=== Year-end charts ===
Chart (2001)	Position
Italian Albums (FIMI)	4
Swiss Albums (Schweizer Hitparade)	5
Chart (2002)	Position
Italian Albums (FIMI)	11
Swiss Albums (Schweizer Hitparade)	38

== Certifications ==
Certifications for Shake
Region	Certification	Certified units/sales
Switzerland (IFPI Switzerland)	3× Platinum	120,000^{^}
Summaries
Europe (IFPI)	Platinum	1,000,000^{*}
^{*} Sales figures based on certification alone.^{^} Shipments figures based on certification alone.
