= Loney, Dear =

Pseudonym of Swedish singer-songwriter Emil Svanängen

Loney dear
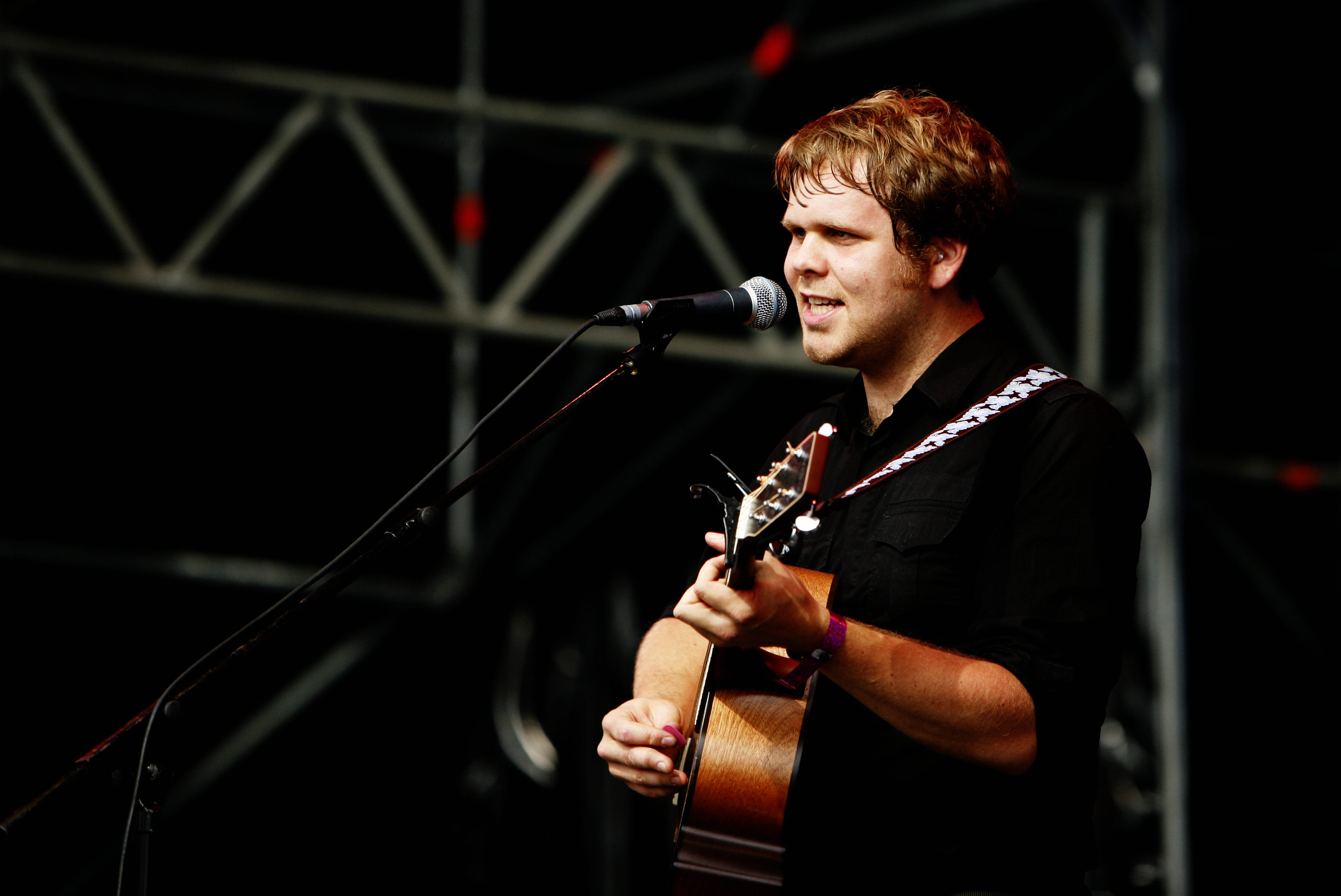
- Loney Dear at the Eurockéennes 2007

Background information
- Born: March 29, 1979 (age 47)
- Origin: Jönköping, Sweden
- Genres: Indie, pop
- Years active: 2003–present
- Labels: Dear John (Sweden); Sub Pop (US); Polyvinyl Record Co. Real World Records
- Members: Emil Svanängen
- Website: loneydear.com

Loney Dear (born Emil Svanängen; March 26, 1979) is a Swedish singer-songwriter and multi-instrumentalist. He has self-released four albums of music in his native Sweden. His first major release came in February, 2007 in the U.S. when Sub Pop re-issued his album Loney, Noir.

== History ==
Emil Svanängen self-released his first album, The Year of River Fontana, in 2003. Recorded in the basement of his parents' home in Jönköping with a minidisk microphone and a home computer, released on home-made CD-Rs, and sold only through his website and at live performances. The album became popular solely on word-of-mouth. The next two years saw Svanängen record and release three more albums. Loney, Dear appeared on the song "This Boy" from I'm From Barcelona's 2006 album Let Me Introduce My Friends.

In 2006, Loney, Dear was signed by U.S. record label Sub Pop. Sub Pop released Loney, Dear's fourth album, Loney, Noir, on February 6, 2007.

In 2009, Loney, Dear joined Andrew Bird as he toured to support Bird's January release of Noble Beast. Loney, Dear did a Ukulele Session for the Belgian newspaper Le Soir, recorded in New York.

His album Loney dear was nominated for IMPALA's European Album of the Year Award.

In 2017, Svanängen was signed to Peter Gabriel's Real World Records. “I am delighted that we are able to work with Loney dear, who I heard Jennie Abrahamson playing while we were on tour. I think he is an extraordinary talent and should be recognised as a great song writer. He may be Europe’s answer to Brian Wilson.” A self-titled album was released in September of that year. Real World released a 50-minute conversation between Peter and Emil

In 2021, Loney Dear released the album A Lantern and a Bell on Real World Records.

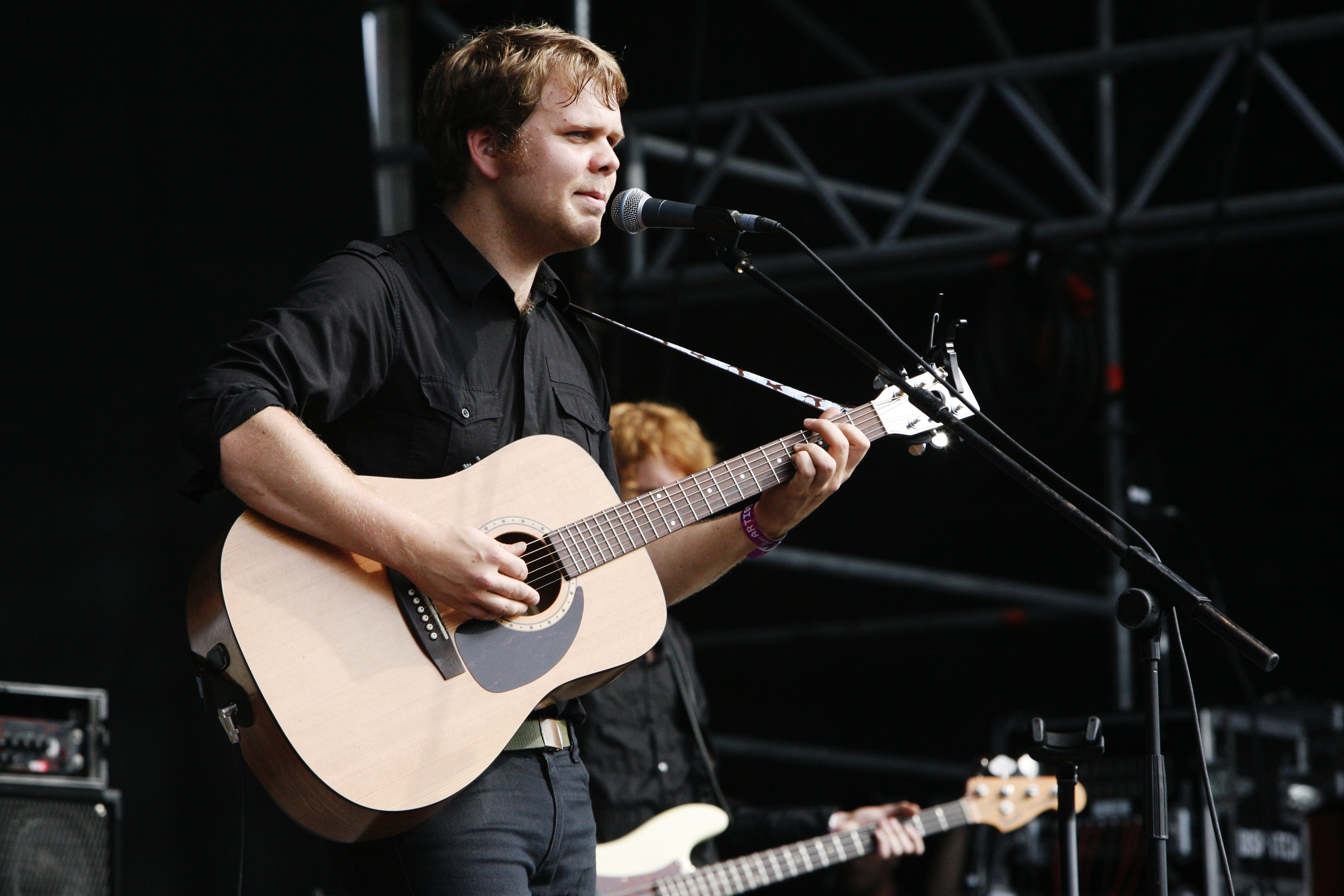
Emil Svanängen

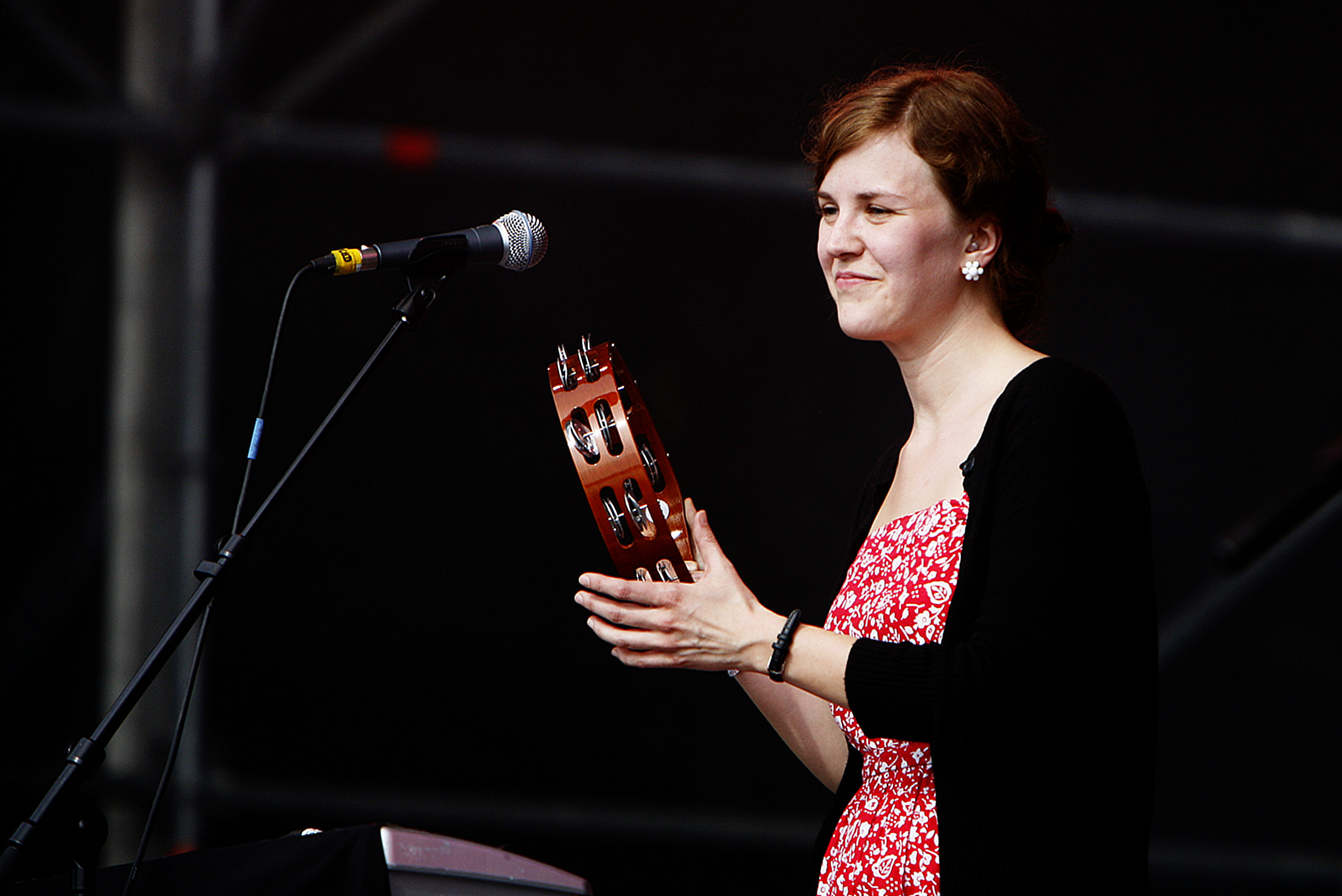
Malin Ståhlberg

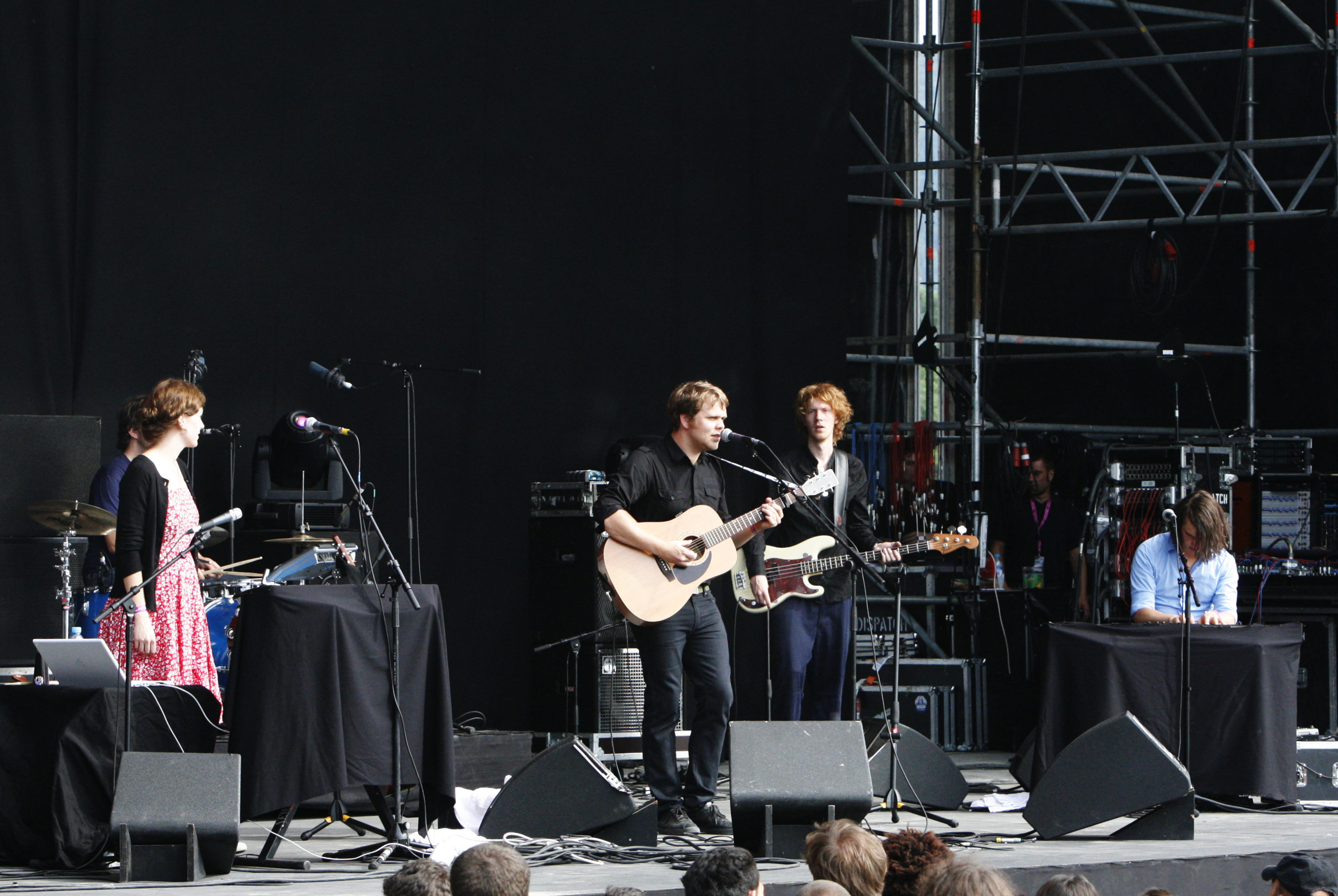

== Discography ==
=== Albums ===
- The Year of River Fontana (2003, self-released)
- Citadel Band (2004, self-released)
- Loney, Noir (2005, self-released)
- Sologne (2006, self-released, Dear John/ Loney dear recordings)
- Loney, Noir (re-issue) (2007, Sub Pop USA/Australia/New Zealand. Parlophone rest of world)
- Dear John (2009, Parlophone. Polyvinyl Record Co. USA)
- Hall Music (2011, Polyvinyl Record Co.)
- Loney Dear (2017, Real World Records)
- A Lantern and a Bell (2021, Real World Records)
- Atlantis (2022, Real World Records)
- ALL THINGS GO (2024, Loney Dear Recordings)

=== Singles ===
- "Hulls" (2017, Real World Records)
- "Sum" (2017, Real World Records)
- "December Lilies" (2017 Woah Dad!) (later pulled due to move to Real World Records)
- "ALL THINGS GO" (2023, Loney Dear Recordings)
- "PLUME" (2023, Loney Dear Recordings)
- "ANIMAL" (2024, Loney Dear Recordings)
