= Blue's =

Studio album by Zucchero
- Released: 15 June 1987
- Recorded: September 1986 – February 1987
- Studio: Fonoprint (Bologna); UMBI Studios (Modena); Eel Pie Studios (London); Townhouse Studios (West London)
- Genre: Rock, blues, pop
- Length: 47:19
- Label: Polydor Records
- Producer: Corrado Rustici

Zucchero chronology
Rispetto (1986)	Blue's (1987)	Oro Incenso & Birra (1989)

Blue's is the fourth studio album by Italian singer-songwriter Zucchero Fornaciari. It was released on 15 June 1987, with Fornaciari credited as "Zucchero Sugar Fornaciari". The album sold over 1.3 million copies.

The success that Zucchero had experienced at music festivals in the early 1980s, including several appearances at the Sanremo Music Festival, eventually attracted the attention of foreign musicians. After travelling to the United States in the mid-1980s, he returned with a new band including some American musicians and a focus on the blues. Among them was keyboardist David Sancious. The tour following the release of the album included performances featuring Joe Cocker, Miles Davis, Eric Clapton, and B. B. King. The album elevated Zucchero's reputation internationally

It became the best-selling album internationally by an Italian musician, until it was overtaken by Zucchero's subsequent studio album Oro Incenso & Birra in 1989.

== Track listing ==
All tracks are written by Zucchero Fornaciari, except where indicated.

No.	Title	Writer(s)	Length
1.	"Blue's introduction"		0:14
2.	"Con le mani"	Zucchero, Gino Paoli	4:42
3.	"Pippo"		4:44
4.	"Dune mosse"	Zucchero, M. Figliè	5:35
5.	"Bambino io, bambino tu (Legenda)"		5:03
6.	"Non ti sopporto più"		4:38
7.	"Senza una donna"		4:26
8.	"Into the groove"		0:23
9.	"Hey man"	Zucchero, Gino Paoli	4:30
10.	"Solo una sana e consapevole libidine salva il giovane dallo stress e dall'azione cattolica"		4:51
11.	"Hai scelto me"		2:27
12.	"Dune mosse" (instrumental)		5:35

== Personnel ==
- Zucchero – vocals, piano
- Giorgio Francis – drums
- Rosario Jermano – percussion
- Polo Jones – bass
- Corrado Rustici – guitar
- David Sancious – keyboards
- Wayne Jackson – trombone, trumpet
- Andrew Love – saxophone
- Clarence Clemons – saxophone
- Eric Daniel – saxophone
- James Thompson, Aida Cooper, Arthur Miles, Simona Pirone, Coro di Voci Maschili della Chiesa Avventista – backing vocals
- John Etchells – sound engineer

== Charts ==
=== Singles ===
Year	Single	Chart	Position
1987	"Con le mani"	Italy Airplay (Music & Media)	4
1987	"Solo una sana e consapevole libidine...e dall'azione cattolica"	Italy Airplay (Music & Media)	7
1987	"Senza una donna"	Italy Airplay (Music & Media)	1
