= Fly (Zucchero album) =

Studio album by Zucchero
- Released: September 22, 2006
- Recorded: Henson Studios, Hollywood; La Pineta Studios, Rome
- Genre: Blues rock, pop rock
- Length: 41:45
- Label: Polydor/Universal
- Producer: Don Was

Zucchero chronology
Zu & Co. (2004)	Fly (2006)	All the Best (2007)

Singles from Fly
- 1. "Bacco perbacco" Released: July 14, 2006; 2. "Cuba libre" Released: July 14, 2006; 3. "Occhi" Released: 20 October 2006; 4. "E’ delicato" Released: 5 February 2007; 5. "Un kilo" Released: 5 March 2007

Fly is the tenth studio album by the Italian blues rock singer-songwriter Zucchero Fornaciari, released on 22 September 2006. The album was mostly recorded in 2006 at the Henson Recording Studios in Hollywood with producer Don Was, and previewed at the historic Ca' Vendramin Calergi in Venice, on 18 September 2006.

== Overview ==
The album Fly is subtitled "(Come possiamo volare con le aquile se siamo contornati da tacchini)", translated "How we can fly among eagles when we are surrounded by turkeys". The album is Zucchero's "small cloud of love on the rain of disharmony around us".

Like in the case of his albums, it includes several notable collaborations. The lyrics of the song "Troppa fedeltà" were co-written by Jovanotti, while those of "È delicato" along Ivano Fossati. The song "L'Amore è nell'aria" is a cover of British band Feeder's song "Broken", a B-side taken from the single "Just the Way I'm Feeling", originally written by Grant Nicholas. Zucchero rearranged the song by Nicholas, and composed new lyrics in Italian.

The songs were recorded by many notable musicians like Brian Auger on the piano, electric piano and Hammond organ, Pino Palladino the bass guitar (#2, #5, #9, #11), Randy Jackson the bas guitar (#1, #8), Michael Landau the guitars (#5, #7, #9, #10, #11), Waddy Wachtel (#2, #8), Amir Questlove Thompson founder of The Roots on the drums (#2, #5, #8, #9), Matt Chamberlain the drums (#1, #3, #7), Jim Keltner the drums (#4, #11), Kenny Aronoff the drums (#4, #6), among others.

== Composition ==
The album intentionally includes older instruments like Hammond organ and Mellotron for a vintage feeling. The song "Pronto" has a verse "C’ho paura [I have fear of] degli americani, e degli inglesi, e degli italiani, dei musulmani e anche dei cristiani", by which he showed his concern and fear from those he did and did not cite who are in the permanent worldwide conflicts.

The song "Quanti anni ho" has less concern and is more tranquil, with nostalgia for lost ethic values, dedicated to his son Adelmo Blu. The "Let it shine" is a song dedicated to the New Orleans and tragedy done by Hurricane Katrina. The "Occhi" is another ballad with 70's style about pure romanticism, while "E’ delicato" about the absolute love. The song "Cuba libre" was written in the wake of Fidel Castro's illness, but it's not about him, yet Cuba and its people for whom has special feelings.

== Release ==
Four singles were released from the album in Italy, "Bacco perbacco", "Cuba libre" and "Occhi" in 2006, "E' delicato" and "Un kilo" in 2007. The album reached number #1 in Switzerland, and Italy, where was at number one four consecutive weeks, with 45 consecutive weeks in the Top 20, being certified 6× Platinum in Italy, 2× Platinum in Switzerland and Gold in Austria and Greece and selling over million copies worldwide.

Different track listings appear in the three international versions of the album released worldwide. The English and Spanish editions have thirteen tracks instead of eleven. "E di grazia plena" does not appear and there are three bonus tracks: "Nel così blu" (a cover of the Procol Harum hit "A Salty Dog" with new Italian lyrics written by Zucchero and Pasqualle Panella), "Flying Away" ("Occhi" with English lyrics) and "Shine" ("Let it shine" with English lyrics).

In addition, in the Spanish release, three of the original tracks in Italian are replaced by the same songs with Spanish lyrics: "Bacco Perbacco" is replaced by "Venus Y Bacco"; Cuba Libre" by "Cuba Libre (Mi Amor)"; and "Pronto" by "Pronto (Que Bueno Està). The South American version of Fly has eleven tracks like the original Italian edition, but includes the same three songs with Spanish lyrics, as released in the Spanish version.

Zucchero toured to promote this album in 2007 with Fly World Tour, with over 100 concerts in Europe, North and South America.

== Reception ==
Professional ratings
Review scores
Source	Rating
Allmusic	3/5 stars

The album has generally met with positive reviews. Marisa Brown from AllMusic gave the (Italian edition) album 3/5 stars. It was noted that the raw rock songs are a "rare occurrence for the album", with most of the rest "slow, introspective, lovelorn ballads", beside "Un Kilo" and "Cuba Libre", something "Peter Gabriel would write if he were Italian".

It was noted the lyrical idea of the nature and space, with the word fly "mentioned numerous times throughout the album, as are ideas of birds and the sky ... the earth and stars and sun" meaning a distance between peoples, concluding "Zucchero knows how to convey emotion without getting overly sappy, which means that it doesn't take a knowledge of Italian to enjoy it".

Italian music reviewer Alfredo Marziano from Rockol considered the album possibly the most convincing after the Oro Incenso & Birra (1989), thankfully also to the session musicians, which made the album feeling it was "played". Seemingly the most beautiful song is "Occhi", there's heat and colour in "E' delicato", while space and depth in "L'amore è nell'aria". The "Bacco perbacco" is frivolous, "Un kilo" has catchy lyrics, and rhythm of The Roots (Questlove exactly), "Cuba libre" a mixture of The Mamas & The Papas and language of Manu Chao, concluding ballads prevalied against the rock songs.

== Track listing ==
Italian edition

All tracks are written by Zucchero Fornaciari, except where noted

No.	Title	Lyrics	Music	Length
1.	"Bacco perbacco"		Zucchero, Robyx (Roberto Zanetti)	3:56
2.	"Un kilo"			3:32
3.	"Occhi"			3:39
4.	"Quanti anni ho"		Zucchero, G. Gancogni, M. Marcolini	4:02
5.	"Cuba libre"			3:33
6.	"E’ delicato"	Zucchero, Ivano Fossati	Zucchero, A. Chiesa, E. Mattei	3:32
7.	"L'amore è nell'aria"		Zucchero, Grant Nicholas	3:37
8.	"Pronto"			3:59
9.	"Let It Shine"		Zucchero, Robyx	4:32
10.	"Troppa fedeltà"	Zucchero, Jovanotti		3:58
11.	"E di grazia plena"			3:14
