= Jenny Bae (violinist) =

South Korean violinist (born 1980)

- Born: 1980 (age 45–46); Seoul, South Korea
- Genres: Classical
- Occupation: Violinist
- Years active: 2000–present
- Website: www.jennybaemusic.com

- Jenny Bae
- Hangul: 배영란
- RR: Bae Yeongran
- MR: Pae Yŏngnan

Jenny Bae (Korean: 배영란; born 1980) is a South Korean crossover violinist. She has been performing internationally for over a decade. She has guest-performed for musicians such as Luciano Pavarotti, Eric Clapton, Lionel Richie, Andrea Bocelli, Plácido Domingo and Zucchero.

== Personal life ==
Bae was born in South Korea. Her family moved to the United States when she was 12. At age 16, her skill as a violinist caught the eye of Dorothy DeLay. Bae attended school in New York from 1999 to 2002, The Juilliard School. She is married to a British businessman and has one son together. They live in London, United Kingdom.

== Career ==
In 2000, Bae performed in her hometown of Seoul, South Korea at the peace concert with Luciano Pavarotti for an audience of 90,000. She also performed at the Rheingau Musik Festival with The Poland Philharmonic and continued touring with the Philharmonic throughout Poland and Germany in 2001.

In 2007, as a Red Cross Ambassador, Bae was asked to make a speech at the United Nations to welcome fellow South Korean Ban Ki-moon as secretary-general. In 2007 and 2008, she was invited by the Nobel Peace Laureates Summit in Rome where she performed in front of guests such as Mikhail Gorbachev, George Clooney and Peter Gabriel. In 2008, as an ambassador to the Red Cross in Asia, she went to South Korea and North Korea to perform before the presidents of both countries. She was the first South Korean to record with the North Korean symphony to help raise the money to build proper hospitals in North Korea.

In 2012, she was featured at the Latin Billboard Awards during Don Omar's performance with Akon and worked with Maria Torres, the art director of the show.

== Discography ==
- Zu & Co live at the Royal Albert Hall (2004)
- Buddha Bar XIII (2011)

== See also ==
- List of South Korean musicians
