= Baila morena (Zucchero song) =

"Baila (Sexy Thing)"
- 2001 album cover for the Italian market

Single by Zucchero and Maná

from the album Shake (original version) Zu & Co. (2006 re-release)
- B-side: "Rock Your Mum" (2006 re-release)
- Released: 5 March 2001
- Recorded: 2000
- Genre: Rock
- Length: 4:04
- Label: Polydor; Universal
- Songwriters: Adelmo Fornaciari; Roberto Zanetti; Sarah Eden Davis (original version)
- Producer: Corrado Rustici

Zucchero singles chronology
| "Blu/Blue" (1998) | "Baila (Sexy Thing)" (2001) | "Ahum" (2001) |

Maná singles chronology
| "Te llevaré al cielo" (2003) | "Baila morena" (2006) | "Labios compartidos" (2006) |

Alternative cover
- 2001 album cover for the European market

"Baila (Sexy Thing)", often known as "Baila morena" ("Dance, Brunette"), is a song by Italian singer Zucchero. The song was first released as the lead single of his ninth studio album Shake, and it was highly popular in Italy and Spain, reaching #1 chart positions, but achieved moderate success in other countries. Zucchero also recorded an English-language version for the single release. Zucchero later re-recorded the song in Spanish with the Mexican rock band Maná for the compilation album Zu & Co, but only reached chart success in 2006 due to its inclusion in the soundtrack of the film French Fried Vacation 3.

On February 2, 2006, the single entered the French Singles Chart at #64, then jumped straight to #1, which is the third biggest jump to number-one in this country. After four weeks at #1, the singles dropped almost every week on the chart, totaling ten weeks in the top ten, 17 in the top 50 and 28 in the top 100. It was certified Gold by the SNEP.

In 2007, the song was covered by Patrick Fiori and Hélène Ségara and included in a medley available on Les Enfoirés' album La Caravane des Enfoirés.

== Composition ==
Zucchero co-wrote the song with Roberto Zanetti who used his "Robyx" alias. The song uses vocal samples from Muddy Waters Mannish Boy and Al Greens Take Me To The River.

== Track listings ==
2001 release

CD single

1. "Baila" (Sexy Thing) (English version) — 4:06
2. "Baila" (Sexy Thing) — 4:06

CD maxi

1. "Baila (Sexy Thing)" — 4:07
2. "Hey Man - Sing a Song" by Zucchero with B.B. King — 4:49
3. "Karma, stai kalma" by Zucchero featuring Irene Fornaciari — 4:45
4. "Baila (Sexy Thing)" (Charlie Rapino club mix) — 6:17

2006 release

CD single

1. "Baila morena" — 4:04
2. "Rock Your Mum" by Étienne Perruchon — 2:46

Digital download

1. "Baila morena" — 4:04

== Charts ==
=== Peak positions ===
| Chart (2001) | Peak position |
|---|---|
| Belgian (Flanders) Singles Chart | 23 |
| Belgian (Wallonia) Singles Chart | 18 |
| Dutch Singles Chart | 90 |
| Italian Singles Chart | 1 |
| German Singles Chart | 97 |
| Swiss Singles Chart | 3 |
| Chart (2002) | Peak position |
| Polish Airplay Chart (Music & Media) | 4 |
| Polish Airplay Chart (ZPAV) | 9 |
| Spanish Singles Chart | 1 |
| Chart (2006) | Peak position |
| Belgian (Wallonia) Singles Chart | 3 |
| Eurochart Hot 100 | 5 |
| French Digital Chart | 1 |
| French Singles Chart | 1 |
| Swiss Singles Chart | 10 |

=== Year-end charts ===
| Chart (2001) | Position |
|---|---|
| Swiss Singles Chart | 11 |
| Chart (2006) | Position |
| Belgian (Wallonia) Singles Chart | 17 |
| French Airplay Chart | 59 |
| French Digital Chart | 8 |
| French TV Airplay Chart | 81 |
| Swiss Singles Chart | 61 |

== Certifications ==
Certifications for "Baila morena"
| Region | Certification | Certified units/sales |
|---|---|---|
| France (SNEP) | Gold | 200,000^{*} |
| Italy (FIMI) Since 2009 | Platinum | 100,000^{‡} |
| Spain (Promusicae) | Gold | 30,000^{‡} |
| Switzerland (IFPI Switzerland) | Gold | 20,000^{^} |
^{*} Sales figures based on certification alone.^{^} Shipments figures based on certification alone.^{‡} Sales+streaming figures based on certification alone.
