= Chocabeck =

Studio album by Zucchero
- Released: 3 November 2010
- Studios: EastWest Studios and Henson Studios, Hollywood
- Genres: Blues rock; pop rock; folk rock
- Length: 43:30
- Labels: Polydor; Universal
- Producers: Don Was; Brendan O'Brien; Zucchero Fornaciari

Zucchero chronology
All the Best (2007)	Chocabeck (2010)	La Sesión Cubana (2012)

Singles from Chocabeck
- 1. "È un peccato morir" Released: October 2010; 2. "Chocabeck" Released: November 2010; 3. "Vedo nero" Released: April 2011

Chocabeck is the eleventh studio album by Italian blues rock singer-songwriter Zucchero Fornaciari released in 2010.

== Overview ==
The term chocabeck derives from the Emilian equivalent to Italian word schioccabecco, meaning the sound of empty beak. He heard it from his father when was very young, describing the social conditions of the time. The dialectal term spicinfrin means a cute, but rebellious boy. He made this kind of album in rebellion against the current music industry system.

It is a concept album, describing a typical Sunday from dawn to dusk in a small countryside Italian village in the region where he grew up. It consists of an autumnal cycle of songs. It's an album in which Zucchero returns to his roots, and is introspective and allegorical about life, positivity, and hope. Each song was accompanied by a music video, with Francesco Guccini appearing in the video of "Un soffio caldo".

Like his previous albums, it includes many notable collaborations. Brian Wilson from the Beach Boys sings backing vocals the title track. The lyrics of the opening song "Un soffio caldo" were co-written with renowned Italian songwriter Guccini, while "Oltre le rive" was written with Pacifico. The lyrics of the last song "God bless the child" were written by Roland Orzabal from the band Tears for Fears, Chaz Jankel, and Derek Hussey. The English versions of "Alla fine" ("Too Late") and "Chocabeck" ("Spirit Together") were written by Iggy Pop.

The collaboration with U2's Bono is Zucchero's third translation after translating into English the songs "Miserere" (1992) and "Blu" ("Blue"; 1998). The lyrics of "Someone Else's Tears" were written by Bono, while Zucchero freely translated them in the counterpart "Il suono della domenica". The song in English is included as bonus track in the Italian edition in iTunes store. According to Zucchero's interpretation of English lyrics, when Bono wrote the song he was probably inspired by something painful he saw or felt. When he heard Zucchero's version before the U2's concert in Rome, Bono initially concentrated silently while it was played, and afterward cried. Zucchero considers the song to be the most representative of the album.

== Composition ==
The album has many arpeggiated guitars, the winds were replaced by the brass, with English horn, harpsichord. Zucchero tried to diminish the rhythmic section, it has percussion but not real drum kit, neither bass, because they take melodic space, while for the album's tematic wanted to leave space for more suspended rhythms. The song "Chocabeck" although modern has 60's influence. "È un peccato morir" is a stirring ballad with nostalgia of days gone by, "Un soffio caldo" is a lyrical adventure through the Italian landscape, "Vedo nero" is a joyous tongue-in-check romp about adolescent eroticism.

== Release ==
The first single in Italy was the song "È un peccato morir", and in the rest of Europe "Chocabeck" and "Vedo nero". The first single was certified Gold by the Federazione Industria Musicale Italiana, and was #1 for six weeks at the radio Music Control Italia tracked by Nielsen SoundScan. "Vedo nero" was certified Platinum by FIMI.

The album was on the FIMI Italian album charts for 89 weeks, peaking at #1 for three weeks. The album was certified 5× Platinum, and already sold over 500,000 copies in Europe before the start of the tour. As has been the case with Zucchero's previous albums, it was released in Italian, European and American edition. The European edition Il Suono Della Domenica includes instead the original English version by Bono, while the American edition (also titled as Zucchero Who?) is sung entirely in English, i.e. including the lyrics by Iggy Pop. In 2011 was also released a deluxe edition with both CDs, and a DVD collection of the music videos.

Fornaciari toured to promote this album in 2011–2012 with Chocabeck World Tour, with over 120 concerts in Europe, Australia, North and South America, almost all sold-out in presale, notably with five consecutive concerts at Arena in Verona.

== Reception ==
Professional ratings
Review scores
Source	Rating
Allmusic	4/5 stars
Rockol	4/5 stars
Rolling Stone	2/5 stars
PopMatters	3/10 stars

The album has generally met with positive reviews. Mariano Prunes from Allmusic gave the (Italian edition) album 4/5 stars, praising "its stylistic and thematic consistency and, of course, Zucchero's emotive singing". The "first three songs, for instance, constitute almost a mini-suite of quiet, hymn-like ballads that set the mood for most of the album", and it "is only when the day reaches noon that loud guitars and soul background vocals come back to announce a double dose of old-school Zucchero", with "the last three tracks progressively slow things down, drawing closed a perfect circle". He concluded that as "the list of collaborators is both impressive and key to the album's success", Zucchero "looks like an artist capable of reinventing himself in a poignant and dignified manner". The experienced Italian musical reviewer Franco Zanetti from Rockol also gave the Italian album 4/5 stars, and praised the production, musicians and Zucchero's singing.

Frank Lähnemann from German Rolling Stone reviewed the European edition and gave it 2/5 stars, noting that there few outliers, not enough for the market and entry in the books of innovations, and questioned why Brian Wilson was only used in the choir. Jonathan Sanders from PopMatters reviewed the American (English) edition and gave it 3/10 stars, ignoring the concept and approaching the album with a stigma Zucchero being Italian Bruce Springsteen, resulting with disappointment, concluding that the "bulk of its appeal" is "lost in trans-Atlantic translation", and that "some of the best songs are the ones Zucchero doesn't even bother translating: "Oltre Le Rive" ... full of melodies that fail to resonate coupled with vocals that fail to define Zucchero as anything but an Italian-rock curiosity".

== Track listing ==
Italian edition

All tracks are written by Zucchero Fornaciari, except where noted.

No.	Title	Lyrics	Music	Length
1.	"Un soffio caldo"			5:02
2.	"Il suono della domenica"			3:36
3.	"Soldati nella mia citta"			3:19
4.	"È un peccato morir"	Pasqualle Panella, Zucchero		3:41
5.	"Vedo nero"	Mimmo Cavallo, Zucchero	Mimmo Cavallo, Zucchero	3:53
6.	"Oltre le rive"	Pacifico, Zucchero	G. Cancogni, L. De Crescenzo, M. Marcolini, Zucchero	4:39
7.	"Un uovo sodo"			3:14
8.	"Chocabeck"	Pasquale Panella, Zucchero		4:42
9.	"Alla fine"			3:43
10.	"Spicinfrin boy"			3:50
11.	"God bless the child"	Chaz Jankel, Roland Orzabal, Derek Hussey		3:47

English edition

All tracks are written by Zucchero Fornaciari, except where noted.

No.	Title	Lyrics	Length
1.	"Life" (Un soffio caldo)		5:02
2.	"Someone Else's Tears" (Il suono della domenica)	Bono	3:36
3.	"Soldati nella mia citta"		3:19
4.	"Glory" (È un peccato morir)		3:41
5.	"Devil In My Mirror" (Vedo nero)		3:53
6.	"Oltre le rive"		4:39
7.	"Gotta Feeling" (Un uovo sodo)		3:15
8.	"Spirit Together" (Chocabeck)	Iggy Pop	4:42
9.	"Too Late" (Alla fine)	Iggy Pop	3:43
10.	"In the Sky" (Spicinfrin boy)		3:49
11.	"God bless the child"		3:47

== Charts ==
=== Weekly charts ===
Chart (2010–11)	Peak position
Austrian Albums (Ö3 Austria)	7
Belgian Albums (Ultratop Flanders)	47
Belgian Albums (Ultratop Wallonia)	53
Dutch Albums (Album Top 100)	31
French Albums (SNEP)	112
German Albums (Offizielle Top 100)	16
Italian Albums (FIMI)	1
Swiss Albums (Schweizer Hitparade)	2

=== Year-end charts ===
Chart (2010)	Position
Swiss Albums (Schweizer Hitparade)	26
Chart (2011)	Position
Swiss Albums (Schweizer Hitparade)	14

== Certifications ==
Region	Certification	Certified units/sales
Austria (IFPI Austria)	Gold	10,000^{*}
Italy (FIMI)	5× Platinum	300,000^{*}
Switzerland (IFPI Switzerland)	Platinum	20,000^{^}
^{*} Sales figures based on certification alone.^{^} Shipments figures based on certification alone.
