= Donne (song) =

Single by Zucchero Fornaciari

from the album Zucchero & The Randy Jackson Band
- B-side: "Ti farò morire"
- Released: February 1985
- Length: 3:37
- Label: Polydor
- Songwriters: Alberto Salerno, Zucchero Fornaciari
- Producer: Corrado Rustici

Zucchero Fornaciari singles chronology
"Sandra" (1983)	"Donne" (1985)	"Canzone triste" (1986)

"Donne" ('Women') is a 1985 song composed by Alberto Salerno (lyrics) and Zucchero Fornaciari (music) and performed by Zucchero Fornaciari and the Randy Jackson Band.

== Background ==
The song was Zucchero's entry for the 35th edition of the Sanremo Music Festival, where it finished second-to-last. Despite its poor outcome at the festival, it proved to be Zucchero's breakthrough and one of the best known songs in his repertoire. The popularity of "Donne" was reinforced by its use as theme song in a long-running Knorr commercial campaign.

In 1994, Zucchero recorded a Spanish-language version of the song titled "Chicas", with lyrics by Fito Paez. Artists who covered the song include Fiorello and Neri per Caso.

== Track listing ==
No.	Title	Writer(s)	Length
1.	"Donne"	Salerno, Zucchero	3:37
2.	"Ti farò morire"	Salerno, Cheope, Zucchero	4:03

== Charts ==
Chart (1985)	Peak position
Italy (Musica e dischi)	21

== Certifications ==
Region	Certification	Certified units/sales
Italy (FIMI) Sales from 2009	Gold	50,000^{‡}
^{‡} Sales+streaming figures based on certification alone.
