= Zucchero Fornaciari =

Italian musician (born 1955)

Zucchero Commendatore OMRI
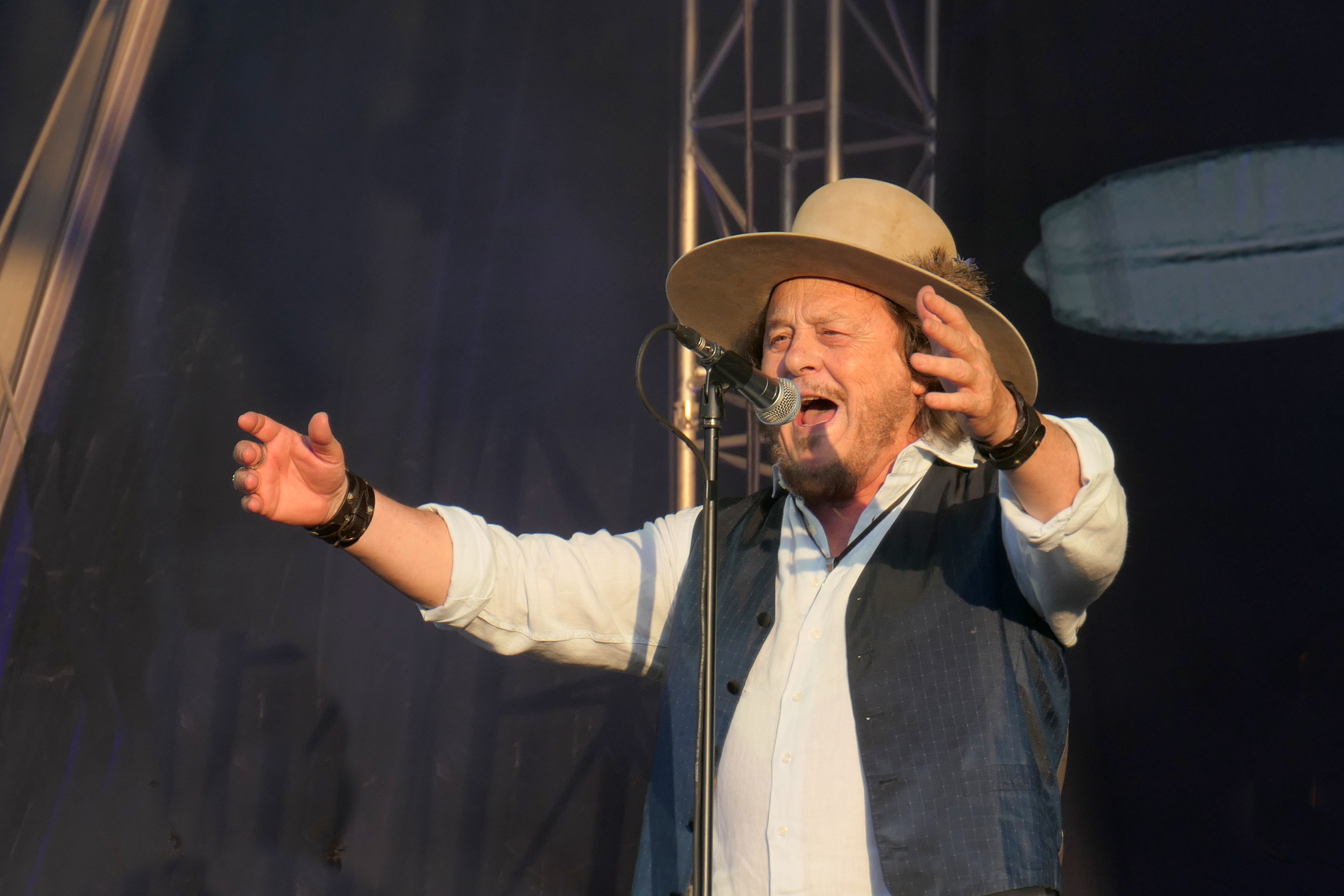
- Zucchero at his 2023 World Wild Tour in Konstanz, Germany

Background information
- Born: Adelmo Fornaciari; 25 September 1955 (age 70); Roncocesi, Reggio Emilia, Emilia-Romagna, Italy
- Genres: Blues; rock; R&B; soul; gospel; funk; pop rock; pop
- Occupations: Musician; singer-songwriter; record producer
- Instruments: Vocals; guitar; keyboards; bass; drums
- Years active: 1970–present
- Labels: Polydor; Universal
- Website: zucchero.it

Adelmo Fornaciari (Italian: [aˈdɛlmo fornaˈtʃaːri]; born 25 September 1955), known professionally as Zucchero Fornaciari or simply Zucchero (Italian: [ˈdzukkero, ˈtsuk-]), is an Italian singer, musician and songwriter. His stage name is the Italian word for "sugar", as his primary school teacher used to call him. His music is largely inspired by gospel, soul, blues and rock music, and alternates between Italian ballads and more rhythmic R&B-boogie-like pieces. He is credited as the "father of Italian blues", introducing blues to the big stage in Italy. He is one of the few European blues artists who still enjoys great international success.

In his career, spanning four decades, Fornaciari has sold over 60 million records around the world, and internationally his most successful singles are "Diamante", "Il Volo/My Love", "Baila (Sexy Thing)/Baila morena", and the duet "Senza una donna (Without a Woman)" with Paul Young. He has won numerous awards, including four Festivalbar, nine Wind Music Awards, two World Music Awards (1993, 1996), six IFPI Europe Platinum Awards, and a Grammy Award nomination. He has collaborated and performed with many famous artists, including Eric Clapton, Jeff Beck, Stevie Ray Vaughan, Brian May, Miles Davis, Ray Charles, Billy Preston, John Lee Hooker, Scorpions, Sheryl Crow, Blues Brothers Band, Elvis Costello, Roland Orzabal, Joe Cocker, Sharon Corr, B. B. King, Sting, Buddy Guy, Bono, Bryan Adams, Mark Knopfler, Iggy Pop, Coldplay, Dolores O'Riordan, Paul Young, Peter Gabriel, Alejandro Sanz, Luciano Pavarotti, and Andrea Bocelli.

== Early life ==
Adelmo Fornaciari was born 25 September 1955 in Roncocesi, a frazione (non-independent municipal hamlet) of Reggio Emilia. His father, Giuseppe Fornaciari, and mother, Rina Bondavalli, came from rural families. At a young age, he was the goalkeeper of A.C. Reggiana 1919. He spent much of his childhood in the seaside town of Forte dei Marmi (Province of Lucca, Tuscany). There, he sang in the choir and played an organ in the local church. At the age of 12 or 13, he discovered American soul and blues music thanks to an African-American friend who was studying in Bologna and lived near his home. The first song he played to Fornaciari was "(Sittin' On) The Dock of the Bay" by Otis Redding, and this immediately inspired his interest in soul music. The friend taught Fornaciari how to play on the guitar songs by Redding, Marvin Gaye, and Sam & Dave. Fornaciari then got together with friends to play rhythm and blues, finding his own way to fuse black music and Mediterranean music. He started writing his own songs when he was 13 or 14 years old, and after learning basic instruments, from 16 he moved on to learning the tenor saxophone. In Forte dei Marmi, he finished his technical high school studies, and moved again, this time to the city of Carrara.

== Career ==
=== 1970–1986: early career and first albums ===
His musical career began in 1970, with several small bands such as I Duca, Le nuove luci, I Decals, Sugar & Daniel, Sugar & Candies. At that time, he was studying veterinary medicine; although he liked animals and the course (taking 39 out of the 51 exams), he wanted to be different from his parents and withdrew from the course in order to pursue his aspirations. In 1975, he went to San Francisco, and there met the young Corrado Rustici from Naples, his future record producer. They talked about a future collaboration on a project with Afro-American influences which was then unusual for Italy.

In 1979, Zucchero wrote "Tutto di te" by Fred Bongusto, and the hit "Te ne vai" by Michele Pecora. He found initial success with a band named Taxi, with whom he won the Castrocaro Music Festival in 1981. He made his first appearance in the famous Sanremo Music Festival in 1982 with the song "Una notte che vola via" but without success. However, he wrote and produced the festival hit song "Lisa" by Stefano Sani. In the 1983 festival, he had a similar success with "Nuvola", and went on to write four other festival songs, including "Volevo dirti", sung by Donatella Milani, which was placed second. His first album, Un po' di Zucchero, was released the same year with moderate success. Although as a young songwriter, he had great success, his solo career did not initially reach the same level of success that he and producers had expected.

Disappointed with his solo career, in 1984 he temporarily moved to San Francisco in California, where he collaborated with his old friend Corrado Rustici. The result of these sessions, with a backing band that included bassist Randy Jackson, was the 1985 album Zucchero & The Randy Jackson Band, and the song "Donne" (in English, "Women"). He again played at the Sanremo festival and, although the song "Donne" ended up in a disappointing penultimate place (due to the festival critics), it became a hit single and one of the classic Italian songs. After the relative success of Zucchero & The Randy Jackson Band, Fornaciari joined Rustici again in California to work on a follow-up album. Rispetto (1986) (in English, "Respect") included several Italian hit singles, including the title track and "Come il sole all'improvviso" (in English, "Suddenly, like the sun"). It went platinum and sold over 300,000 copies.

=== 1987–1994: breakthrough in Italy and first international successes ===
Although Zucchero & The Randy Jackson Band and Rispetto were commercially successful, it was the 1987 album Blue's that went on to become the highest selling album in Italian history (until his following album in 1989), selling 1.5 million copies in 1987 alone; it made Fornaciari a household name in Italy, and neighbouring countries. The album, again produced by Rustici and featuring musical performances by Clarence Clemons, The Memphis Horns and David Sancious, included the Italian hit singles "Con Le Mani" (in English, "With the hands"), with lyrics by Gino Paoli, the controversial "Solo una sana..." (in English "Only a healthy...."), and the original version of "Senza una donna" (in English, "Without a woman") which later became an international hit in a duet version with Paul Young. During the following Blue's Tour Fornaciari shared the stage with Joe Cocker (for a cover of "With a Little Help From My Friends"), Ray Charles and Dee Dee Bridgewater. In the same year, he also composed the soundtrack for the film Snack Bar Budapest, written and directed by Tinto Brass.

In 1989, Fornaciari and his band recorded the album Oro Incenso & Birra in Memphis. The album, which was greatly influenced by American soul music, included guest appearances by Ennio Morricone, Eric Clapton, and blues singer Rufus Thomas; Fornaciari's band by that time included former E-Street Band member David Sancious. The album still stands as not only one of Fornaciari's, but also Italian most successful albums, outselling even Blue's and includes the Italian hit singles "Diamante" (lyrics written by Francesco De Gregori, dedicated to Zucchero's grandmother Diamante), "Overdose (d'Amore)", "Il Mare" and "Wonderful World". The single "Diamante" included new version of the song "Dune Mosse" recorded along Miles Davis. Davis himself insisted to re-record the song with Zucchero, describing it "interesting Mediterranean type of blues". As of 2015 are reported sales of over 8 million copies. By the Rolling Stone Italia it was included among the most beautiful Italian music albums of all time.

After the million selling success of Blue's and Oro Incenso & Birra in Italy, and his live collaborations with Joe Cocker, Stevie Ray Vaughan, Eric Clapton (whom supported on tour and performed at Royal Albert Hall in London) and Miles Davis, Fornaciari from 1990 on attempted to conquer the rest of Europe. The album Blue's was released the following year in the United Kingdom, and in 1990 Zucchero Sings His Hits in English, an album that featured songs from the Blue's and Oro Incenso & Birra albums, some of which translated to English by Frank Musker, was released worldwide.

"When I do the English version of a song, I lose something. I would like to find a way to translate my songs from Italian to English better, because my lyrics are very personal and I use a lot of slang, the typical Italian way to say something. When they translate this, you lose the sarcasm or irony. People in England and America only know me for ballads, but my fast songs are very sarcastic. I'm really more like Tom Waits or Charles Bukowski than Whitney Houston".

— Zucchero, on the advice by record producers to translate songs to English to achieve international popularity.

Fornaciari's best known hit "Senza una donna" ("Without a Woman"), in a duet with Paul Young, is from this album. The first pressing of the album didn't feature the duet: the song was performed by Fornaciari only. The duet was a great success worldwide, it topped the European Hot 100, Italian, Belgian, Norwegian, and Swedish charts, and reached the top 3–5 in other international charts in 1991 including UK and US. Other European singles from the Hits album include English versions of "Diamante", and "Wonderful World" (with Eric Clapton). Diamante was later released as a duet with Randy Crawford, a variant not available on any album until the special edition of Zu & Co. (2004). Although advised to record in English to achieve international popularity he expressed doubt; "unfortunately, the only songs you can translate easily into English are the ballads, the love songs. That is a shame".

Between 1991 and 1993 Fornaciari continued duetting with some of the world's most famous artists, such as Sting, Luciano Pavarotti, a young Andrea Bocelli (who after the Zucchero's collaboration on "Miserere" started to get growing popularity), Peter Maffay, Elton John, Brian May and Eric Clapton. Many of these duets would later be included in the compilation Zu & Co. (2004). The 1991 was released Fornaciari's first live album Live at the Kremlin, recorded in Moscow Kremlin 1990 (being the first Western artist to perform there after the fall of Berlin Wall) and featuring guest appearances by Randy Crawford (on John Lennon's "Imagine") and Toni Childs. In 1992 was invited by Brian May to perform at The Freddie Mercury Tribute Concert, with the remaining three members of Queen - Brian May, John Deacon and Roger Taylor, singing "Las Palabras de Amor". He admitted having been 'terrified' before hitting the Wembley Stadium stage, as this was his first time performing live at a worldwide broadcast event. In 1993 was invited by Dan Aykroyd to perform at House of Blues in celebration of 46th birthday of John Belushi, playing "Diavolo in me" and "You are so beautiful" supported by The Blues Brothers Band.

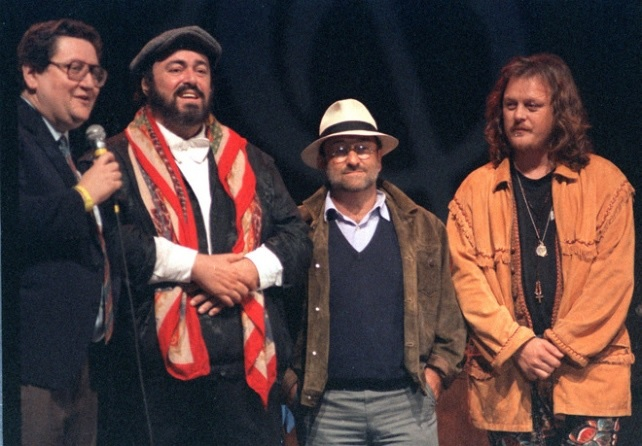
From left: journalist Vincenzo Mollica, Luciano Pavarotti, Lucio Dalla and Zucchero on the first edition of Pavarotti & Friends, 1992

Between 1992 and 2003 was the regular cast of the charity concerts Pavarotti & Friends organized by Luciano Pavarotti, where also performed along Pavarotti and B.B. King, for the children in Bosnia, Liberia, Guatemala, Kosovo, Cambodia, Tibet, Angola and Iraq.

In 1992 Fornaciari released the million selling album Miserere. Again produced by Corrado Rustici, it was a much darker album than Fornaciari's previous works, which was made clear by the title track "Miserere" (Have Mercy), a duet with Luciano Pavarotti. The "darkness" reflects his intimate personal life from the time when lived in solitude and depression after the divorce. Elvis Costello co-wrote the track "Miss Mary", U2's Bono was responsible for the English version of the "Miserere", and Paul Buchanan of The Blue Nile co-wrote two tracks. On the album and during the tour, Fornaciari was accompanied by former Santana drummer Michael Shrieve. The English version of the title track "Miserere" peaked at number 15 in UK. The compilation album Diamante was released in Mexico and other Latin American countries in 1994, and was an attempt to use the same method of Zucchero sings his hits in English for the Spanish and Latin American market. In 1994 Zucchero was the only Italian artist to perform at the 25th anniversary edition of the Woodstock festival.

=== 1995–2008: peak of musical career ===
The 1995 album Spirito DiVino, that included the smash European hits "Il Volo", "Papà perché?" and "X colpa di chi", is one of Fornaciari's most successful up to date, selling over 2,5 million copies in Europe alone (until 1996) and ending up on the first place in the Italian year charts, and Top 5 in France and Switzerland, the album proved a huge commercial success. On the album Fornaciari adds a certain New Orleans blues feeling to his music (especially on songs like "Voodoo Voodoo") and is accompanied by musicians such as David Sancious, Jeff Beck (on "Papa Perché?"), Sheila E. (on "Alleluja", written by Italian rapper Jovanotti) and former Chuck Berry pianist Johnny Johnson. It, with the upcoming compilation, was promoted with over 150 concerts, an estimated audience of 1.4 million people.

The compilation The Best of Zucchero Sugar Fornaciari's Greatest Hits was released in 1996, shooting into all European charts, up to the number one position in France and Italy, and selling over 3 million copies in Europe. The CD, released in an Italian and an English version, contained 13 of Fornaciari's greatest hits (excluding the Miserere period) and three new songs including the hit single "Menta e rosmarino" ("I feel so lonely tonight"). The re-redition in 1997 included Continental hit cover of "Va pensiero" by Giuseppe Verdi. During the sold-out tour Fornaciari sang with Buddy Guy in Milan, and played "My Love" (the English version of "Il Volo") and "Un piccolo aiuto" (together with Eric Clapton) during the '96 Pavarotti and Friends show. The Best of Tour also brought Fornaciari to the US for the first time playing to four sold out consecutive concerts at House of Blue in Los Angeles. He performed for the fundraising Rainforest Foundation in New York, and Zoological Society of Florida, Miami.

On the 1998 album Bluesugar, Fornaciari moved from Spirito DiVino's New Orleans feeling to a more British rock style, like of Robert Johnson and Radiohead. The band recording it included Santana bassist Benny Rietveld and bluesharp player Mark Feltham. Steve Winwood played Hammond on two songs, while Bono wrote the lyrics to the English version of lead single "Blu". The album went on to sell over 1 million copies in several months. In February 1999 in UK was released a duet of "Va Pensiero" along Sinéad O'Connor. The world tour included for the first time Australia and Asia. In 1999 was invited by Bono to participate at charity NetAid event, where at Giants Stadium in New Jersey performed "Il volo", along Bono U2's One, and with various artists the single song "New Day".

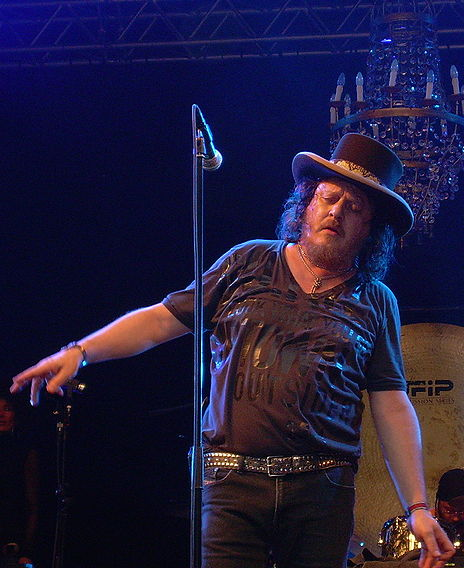
Zucchero performing at the Skanderborg Festival in Denmark, 2007

Following a lengthy tour to promote Bluesugar, Fornaciari took some time off to work on new music. In the 2001 production of the Sanremo Festival, Zucchero co-wrote the songs "Luce (Tramonti a nord est)" by Elisa, and "Di sole e d'azzurro" by Giorgia, which charted as first and second respectively, both winning the festival awards. He reappeared in the summer of 2001 with the European hit single "Baila morena" (re-released in 2006), described as "swinging track densely populated with crunching electric guitars, thick piano and organ vamps, and soaring bluesy female vocals over Zucchero's trademark rasp". The album Shake, that followed two months later, ended up being another European million selling album. The album is described as "multi-layered blend of acoustic and electric guitars, and the interplay of various vocal ranges and languages set the tone for a stunning album with unfailingly excellent material". On the album blues musician John Lee Hooker appears on the ballad "Ali D'Oro", his last recording before his death in June 2001. In 2002 and 2003 Fornaciari and his band toured throughout Europe and Canada with the sold-out Shake tour. In December 2002 at the Italian Music Awards received by FIMI the "Special Award — Italian Artist in the World".

Zucchero performed the Italian versions of the songs from the DreamWorks animated drama Spirit: Stallion of the Cimarron (2002). On 29 November 2003, participated in the 46664 charity (AIDS) concert at Green Point Stadium, Cape Town, as well again in 2005, organized by Nelson Mandela. At the concerts, he was invited by Brian May to become the new singer for Queen replacing Freddie Mercury, but he declined, and they continued forming Queen + Paul Rodgers.

The spring of 2004 saw the release of the duet album Zu & Co., top five success in Europe. On the album, which had been sixteen years in the making, Fornaciari duets with international stars. On 6 May 2004 the album was presented during a concert in London's Royal Albert Hall, where many of the album's gueststars appeared to perform with Fornaciari. The American 2005 album edition was released in partnership with the Starbucks Hear Music label and Concord Records, and managed to enter the Billboard 200 and top the World Albums chart. They included cover "Indaco Dagli Occhi Del Cielo" ("Everybody's Got to Learn Sometime" by The Korgis). In July 2005, Fornaciari took part in the Live 8 concerts in both Rome and Paris.

In September 2006 was released million selling studio album Fly, certified 5× Platinum in Italy. Produced by Don Was, it included the European hit singles "Bacco perbacco" and "Occhi", and features collaborations with artists such as Ivano Fossati and Jovanotti. The album's track "L'amore è nell'aria", borrows the instrumental backing to the B-side "Broken" by UK rock band Feeder, as was co-written by their lead singer Grant Nicholas. The Fly Tour, kicking off in May in Paris, France, has included dates in most European countries, as well as the U.S. (including a show in Carnegie Hall in New York), and Latin America, with over 100 concerts worldwide.

At the 49th Annual Grammy Awards got nominated for Best Traditional R&B Performance for the song "You Are So Beautiful" along Sam Moore Billy Preston, Eric Clapton, Robert Randolph. In November 2007, Fornaciari released a new compilation album All the Best with several new tracks, including a popular cover of Black's "Wonderful Life". In the spring of 2008 Fornaciari began his All the Best Tour, which included stops in Europe, America, and Australia where he was joined on stage by Tina Arena in Sydney. November 2008 also saw the release of Live in Italy, a double boxset with recordings of sold-out Arena performance in Verona in 2007, and Milan in 2008, as well as three new tracks, including the single "Una Carezza", published by Edizioni Larus and Universal Music Group. In June 2008 also performed at the Nelson Mandela 90th Birthday Tribute held in Hyde Park, London. In 2009 at Ischia Global Film & Music Fest received the Global Music Award.

=== 2009–2014: Chocabeck and cuban parenthesis ===
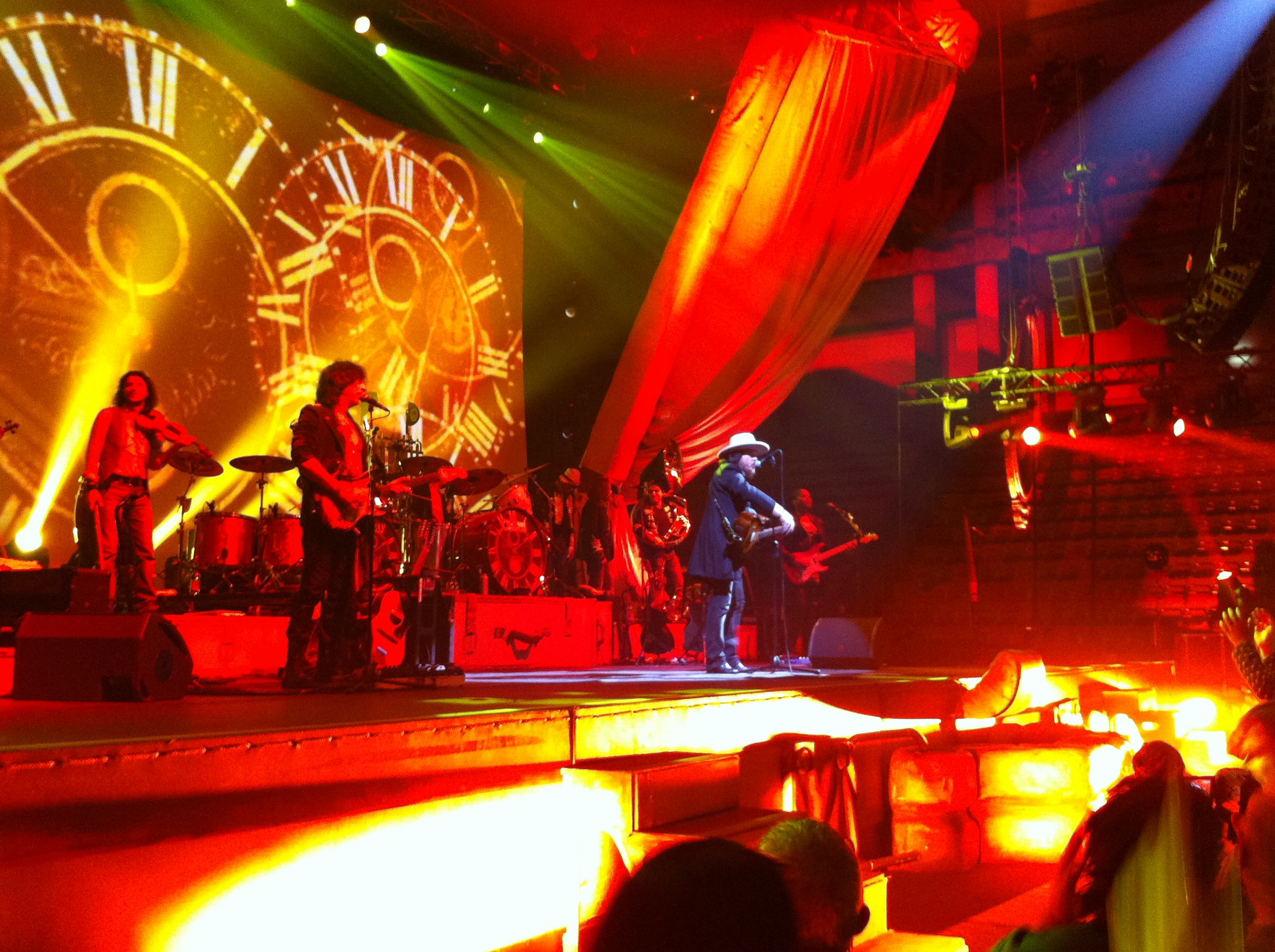
Zucchero playing in Acireale during the Chocabeck World Tour, 2011

In November 2010, Fornaciari released a studio album entitled Chocabeck, certified 5× Platinum in Italy. The album was produced by Don Was, Brendan O'Brien, and Zucchero and includes collaborations with Brian Wilson, Roland Orzabal ("God bless the child"), and Bono ("Someone Else's Tears"). The first single in Italy was the song "È Un Peccato Morir", followed by hits "Chocabeck", and "Vedo Nero". In March 2011, after three years, Zucchero started the Chocabeck World Tour, notably with five consecutive concerts at the Arena in Verona.

In the response to the 2012 Northern Italy earthquakes in Emilia-Romagna, Zucchero participated and opened the "Concerto per l'Emilia" (€1-2 million) at Stadio Renato Dall'Ara in Bologna, and "Italia Loves Emilia" (€4 million) at the airport in Reggio Emilia in front of over 150,000 people. He received the premium awards "Premio Pavarotti", and "Giovani di Collisioni".

On 20 November 2012, was released album La Sesion Cubana which was recorded in Cuba with Cuban musicians, including older and newer songs in Latin, Cuban, Tex-Mex rhythm arrangement. It was anticipated in October by the single "Guantanamera (Guajira)", and later was extracted single "Love is All Around" which video was filmed in the streets of Havana. In 2013 the album was certified 3× Platinum in Italy. On 8 December the album was presented with a special free concert at the park of Instituto Superior de Arte in Havana, in front of nearly 70,000 people. The concert was organized in the collaboration with both Cuban and Italian Ministries, cultural institutions, with advanced technology brought from Europe, resulting with the biggest foreigner concert in Cuba up to date. It was recorded and filmed, being released as live album and DVD, Una Rosa Blanca, in 2013. Zucchero became the honorary member of the National Union of Writers and Artists of Cuba, recognition received by the Cuban Minister of Culture, Fernando Rojas.

In February 2013 performed and received a special "L.A. Italia Excellence Award" at the Grammy Museum. In March 2013, on stage in Bologna, he dedicated to Lucio Dalla, who had died a year earlier, his free Italian translation of the piece Ave Maria No Morro by Herivelto Martins, with some fragments of a poem by Gabriele Moreno Locatelli. The sold-out La Sesión Cubana World Tour started on 5 April in Tahiti, French Polynesia, with an audience of 10,000 people. It included three consecutive sold-out performances in the Arena of Verona. In June performed at the protest-against poverty concert Agit8 organized by Bono at the Tate Modern in London.

In March 2014 started the Americana Tour with over 50 concerts in Canada and the United States. A special concert was held on 23 April at a sold-out Madison Square Garden in New York, with many notable guests including Sting, Sam Moore, Jovanotti and Elisa. In 2014 he performed at the Night of the Proms concerts in Europe.

=== 2015–present: back to roots and new experiments ===
Zucchero and Alejandro Sanz recorded the Italian duet version of Sanz's single "Un Zombie a la Intemperie", and Zucchero performed at his concert in Madrid. For U2's 5 September show in Turin, Zucchero was the special guest and played "I Still Haven't Found What I'm Looking For". In October 2015, Fornaciari performed at the Voices for Refugees concert in Vienna, the Europe's first solidarity concert for refugees, in front of an audience of 120,000. He performed "Love Is All Around", and covered "Everybody's Got to Learn Sometime" and "Va pensiero", the latter with the children's choir.

In April 2016 new studio album Black Cat was released: it marks a music comeback to soul & blues roots and sound of Oro Incenso & Birra. On CNN it was announced that the album will include a new song Streets of Surrender (S.O.S) which lyrics written by Bono, dedicated to the victims of November 2015 Paris attacks.

It was presented at a series of 11 consecutive concerts at the Arena in Verona in September, and a subsequent world tour. The Arena concerts, held between 16 and 28 September, were his only concerts in Italy in 2016, and they were characterized by a vast and diverse repertoire of old and new songs, and some special guests. After guesting at Sanremo Music Festival 2017, the Black Cat Word Tour continued during 2017 reaching 137 events in thirteen months, 22 of them at the Arena di Verona. At the end of 2017, in order to celebrate the thirty-five years old career, Wanted (The Best Collection) was released.

In 2018 the Italian bluesman continued touring around Europe. The most important concerts were held in Piazza San Marco and in Hyde Park, London, for the British Summer Time Festival. In October he won his first "Premio Tenco", one of the most important Italian music award.

In 2019 his fourteenth studio album D.O.C. was released while a new acoustic version of the album was released in 2021. Being the subsequent world tour postponed due to COVID-19 pandemic just few weeks after being guest at Sanremo Music Festival 2020, a short reduced capacity acoustic tour was held in Italy and some European festivals during summer 2021. At the end of 2021 the first cover album in Zucchero's career was released, called Discover, and followed by the Word Wild Tour during 2022.

== Personal life ==
Fornaciari currently lives in Pontremoli, Tuscany. He has three children, including Irene Fornaciari, who is also a singer-songwriter. He enjoys the Italian countryside lifestyle. In 2012 he adopted from a distance two children who live in Kenya.

== Discography ==
Studio albums

- Un po' di Zucchero (1983)
- Zucchero & The Randy Jackson Band (1985)
- Rispetto (1986)
- Blue's (1987)
- Oro Incenso & Birra (1989)
- Miserere (1992)
- Spirito DiVino (1995)
- Bluesugar (1998)
- Shake (2001)
- Fly (2006)
- Chocabeck (2010)
- La Sesion Cubana (2012)
- Black Cat (2016)
- D.O.C. (2019)
- Discover (2021)
- Discover II (2024)

Compilation albums

- Zucchero (1990)
- The Best of Zucchero Sugar Fornaciari's Greatest Hits (1996)
- Zu & Co. (2004)
- All the Best (2007)
- Wanted (The Best Collection) (2017)

== Duets ==
Zucchero has collaborated with a great number of Italian as well as international musicians, singers and authors.

=== Italian artists ===
- Luigi Albertelli
- Dodi Battaglia
- Andrea Bocelli
- Fred Bongusto
- Brunella Borciani
- Alberto Borsari
- Andrea Braido
- Gabriele Cancogni
- Beppe Caruso
- Rossana Casale
- Maurizio Castelli
- Mimmo Cavallo
- Alessandro Chiesa
- Adelio Cogliati
- Aida Cooper
- Andrea Cozzali
- Joe Damiani
- Elio D'Anna
- Francesco De Gregori
- Vincenzo Draghi
- Elisa
- Fiordaliso
- Ivano Fossati
- Irene Fornaciari
- Paolo Gianolio
- Giorgia
- Loretta Goggi
- Massimo Greco
- Sara Grimaldi
- Francesco Guccini
- Jovanotti
- Luciano Ligabue
- Luciano Luisi
- Umbi Maggi
- Fiorella Mannoia
- Renè Mantegna
- Ricky Mantoan
- Massimo Marcolini
- Mia Martini
- Eddy Mattei
- Lele Melotti
- Mietta
- Donatella Milani
- Mina
- Mogol
- Ennio Morricone
- Nomadi
- Pasquale Panella
- Gino Paoli
- Claudio Pascoli
- Luciano Pavarotti
- Michele Pecora
- Alfredo Rapetti
- Leonardo Rosi
- Davide Rossi
- Enrico Ruggeri
- Corrado Rustici
- Alberto Salerno
- Stefano Sani
- Mario Tessuto
- Michele Torpedine
- Maurizio Vandelli
- Mino Vergnaghi
- Giuseppe Vessicchio
- Betty Vittori
- Roberto Zanetti
- Iva Zanicchi
- Fio Zanotti

=== International artists ===
- 2Cellos
- Alannah Myles
- Alejandro Sanz
- Anggun
- Ardent Gospel Choir
- Axelle Red
- B.B. King
- Bebe
- Berliner Philharmoniker
- Billy Preston
- Blues Brothers
- Bono
- Brendan O'Brien
- Brian Auger
- Brian May
- Brian Wilson
- Bryan Adams
- Buddy Guy
- Cheb Mami
- Cheryl Porter
- Clarence Clemons
- Dan Aykroyd
- David Sancious
- Dee Dee Bridgewater
- Djavan
- D.J. Fontana
- Dolores O'Riordan
- Don Was
- Eddie Floyd
- Elvis Costello
- Eric Bazilian
- Eric Clapton
- Eric Daniel
- Faudel
- Fher Olvera
- Frank Musker
- Haylie Ecker
- Gérard Depardieu
- Howard Gospel Choir
- Iggy Pop
- Ilse DeLange
- James Thompson
- Jeff Beck
- Jeffrey Foskett
- Jim Belushi
- Jim Diamond
- Jenny Bae
- Joe Cocker
- Johnny Hallyday
- John Lee Hooker
- Jon Hopkins
- Jools Holland
- Keith Reid
- Lara Fabian
- Léo Ferré
- Lester Snell
- Lisa Hunt
- Luka Šulić
- Macy Gray
- Maná
- Mark Knopfler
- Marco Borsato
- Mike Chapman
- Miles Davis
- Mousse T.
- Nabil
- New Orleans Gospel Choir
- Nicky Chinn
- Noa
- Nourith
- Paul Young
- Patrick Bruel
- Patrick Fiori
- Peter Gabriel
- Peter Maffay
- Pino Palladino
- Polo Jones
- Procol Harum
- Queen
- Randy Crawford
- Randy Jackson
- Ray Charles
- Richard Sanderson
- Robert Randolph
- Ronan Keating
- Ronnie Jones
- Rosana
- Sam Moore
- Scorpions
- Scotty Moore
- Sergio Dalma
- Sérgio Mendes
- Sharon Corr
- Sheryl Crow
- Sinéad O'Connor
- Solomon Burke
- Stephan Eicher
- Steve Winwood
- Stevie Ray Vaughan
- Sting
- Stjepan Hauser
- Texas
- Tina Arena
- Tom Jones
- Tomoyasu Hotei
- Toni Childs
- Tyrone Moss
- Vanessa Carlton
- Vivaldi Orchestra Moscow
- Wynonna Judd
- Youssou N'Dour
- Yuri Kasparyan

== See also ==
- Adelmo e i suoi Sorapis
- Italian estimated best-selling music artists
