= Oro Incenso & Birra =

Studio album by Zucchero
- Released: 13 June 1989
- Studio: Real World, Bath, UK; Ardent, Memphis, Tennessee, US; Power Station, New York City; Umbi Medicina Blanche, Modena, Italy
- Length: 42:16
- Label: Polydor
- Producer: Corrado Rustici

Zucchero chronology
Snack Bar Budapest (1988)	Oro Incenso & Birra (1989)	Zucchero (1990)

Oro Incenso & Birra (Gold, Frankincense & Beer) is the fifth studio album released by the Italian singer-songwriter Zucchero Fornaciari on 13 June 1989. As with his previous album Blue's, the album is credited to "Zucchero Sugar Fornaciari". Its title represents a pun on "oro incenso e mirra", the Italian for "gold, frankincense and myrrh", with mirra being replaced by birra, meaning beer.

It has sold an estimated 1.84 million copies in Italy and 2.5 million copies in Europe up to 1995, becoming the best-selling album internationally by an Italian until it was overtaken by Andrea Bocelli's album Romanza in 1997. As of 2015 it has reported sales of over 8 million copies. Rolling Stone Italia included the album in its list of "the 100 best Italian music albums of all time".

== Composition ==
This was the last Zucchero album to be sung entirely in Italian: subsequent albums have been released in international versions with English lyrics on some tracks. The guitar solo in "A Wonderful World" was written and performed by Eric Clapton, a close friend of Zucchero's.

The Italian singer-songwriter Francesco de Gregori wrote the lyrics for the song "Diamante", one of Zucchero's biggest hits to date. On the album credits "Diamante" is dedicated to Diamante Arduini Fornaciari, Zucchero's grandmother. The song was included in the Baywatch episode "Tequila Bay" in Season 3.

The song "Libera L'Amore" was composed by Ennio Morricone.

The album also features guest performances by Clarence Clemons, Rufus Thomas, James Taylor and Jimmy Smith.

== Track listing ==
All tracks are written by Zucchero Fornaciari, except where indicated

No.	Title	Writer(s)	Length
1.	"Overdose (d'Amore)"		5:21
2.	"Nice (Nietzsche) Che Dice"		3:19
3.	"Il Mare Impetuoso al Tramonto Salì sulla Luna e Dietro una Tendina di Stelle..."		3:56
4.	"Madre Dolcissima"		7:17
6.	"Iruben Me"		5:49
7.	"A Wonderful World"		4:33
8.	"Diamante"	music: Zucchero Fornaciari; lyrics: Francesco de Gregori	5:44
9.	"Libera l'Amore"	music: Ennio Morricone; lyrics: Zucchero Fornaciari	2:13
Total length:			42:16

== Personnel ==
Adapted from the album's liner notes.

Band

- Zucchero – vocals, Hammond organ on "Diavolo in Me"
- Corrado Rustici – guitars, sitar, computer programming, additional keyboards, effects
- David Sancious – keyboards
- Giorgio Francis – drums
- Polo Jones – bass

Additional musicians

- Amelia Monari – "Nonna" on "Diamante"
- Ardent Gospel Choir – vocals on "Madre Dolcissima", "Diamante"
- Arthur Miles – backing vocals on "Nice (Nietzsche) Che Dice", sermon on "Diavolo in Me"
- Clarence Clemons – saxophone on "Il Mare Impetuoso..."
- Ennio Morricone – music and arrangement on "Libera l'Amore"
- Eric Clapton – guitar on "A Wonderful World"
- Fanta Toure – Swahili choir on "Il Mare Impetuoso..."
- James Taylor – Hammond organ on "Nice (Nietzsche) Che Dice", "Il Mare Impetuoso..."
- James Thompson – backing vocals on "Nice (Nietzsche) Che Dice"
- Jay Blackfoot – vocals on "Madre Dolcissima"
- Jimmy Smith – Hammond organ on "Overdose (d'Amore)"
- Lisa Hunt – backing vocals on "Overdose (d'Amore)" and "Diavolo in Me"; backing vocals and solo in "Madre Dolcissima"
- The Memphis Horns (Wayne Jackson – trumpet, trombone; Andrew Love – saxophone) on "Overdose (d'Amore)", "Madre Dolcissima", "Diavolo in Me"
- Mory Thioune – Swahili choir on "Il Mare Impetuoso..."
- Rosario Jermano – percussion on "Overdose (d'Amore)", "Il Mare Impetuoso...", "Madre Dolcissima", "Diavolo in Me", "Iruben Me", "A Wonderful World"
- Ruby Wilson – vocals on "Madre Dolcissima"
- Rufus Thomas – vocal introduction on "Overdose (d'Amore)"
- Simone Pirone – backing vocals on "Overdose (d'Amore)", "Madre Dolcissima", "Diavolo in Me", "Il Mare Impetuoso..."
- Il Coro delle Voci della Chiesa Avventista del Settimo Giorno – vocals on "Il Mare Impetuoso..."

== Certifications ==
Region	Certification	Certified units/sales
Italy (FIMI) Since 2009	Platinum	50,000^{‡}
Switzerland (IFPI Switzerland)	Platinum	50,000^{‡}
^{‡} Sales+streaming figures based on certification alone.

== See also ==
- List of best-selling albums in Italy
