= Diamante (Zucchero Fornaciari song) =

Single by Zucchero Fornaciari

from the album Oro Incenso & Birra
- B-side: "Il mare (impetuoso al tramonto salì sulla luna e dietro una tendina di stelle...)"
- Released: 6 April 1990
- Genre: Pop; blues
- Label: Polydor/PolyGram
- Composers: Zucchero Fornaciari; Mino Vergnaghi; Matteo Saggese
- Lyricist: Francesco De Gregori
- Producer: Corrado Rustici

Zucchero Fornaciari singles chronology
"A Wonderful World" (1989)	"Diamante" (1990)	"Madre dolcissima" (1990)

Music video
- "Diamante" on YouTube

"Diamante" ("Diamond") is a song composed by Francesco De Gregori (lyrics), Zucchero Fornaciari, Mino Vergnaghi and Matteo Saggese (music) and performed by Zucchero Fornaciari.

== Background ==
The song, a portrait of the Italian post-war and of the ordinary life in the Po Valley countryside of the time, is dedicated to Diamante Arduini Fornaciari, the singer's grandmother. Zucchero asked his friend De Gregori to write the lyrics as he feared to be overly involved, and to compose something corny.

A track of the 1989 album Oro Incenso & Birra, the song was first released as a single in 1990, and was re-released in 1991 in an English-language duet version with Randy Crawford, which was included on Crawford's 1992 album Through the Eyes of Love. In 1994, Zucchero recorded a Spanish-language version of the song, with lyrics translated and adapted by Fito Páez. Artists who covered the song include Mia Martini, Anna Oxa and Fabio Concato.

== Track listing ==
- 7" single - Polydor – 873 850-7
1. "Diamante" (Francesco De Gregori, Zucchero Fornaciari, Mino Vergnaghi, Matteo Saggese) - 4:25
2. "Il mare (impetuoso al tramonto salì sulla luna e dietro una tendina di stelle...)" (Zucchero Fornaciari) - 3:57

== Charts ==
=== Weekly charts ===
Original version

Chart (1989-1990)	Peak position
Italy Airplay (Music & Media)	3
Netherlands (Dutch Charts)	18

Version with Randy Crawford

Chart (1991-1992)	Peak position
Belgium (Ultratop)	9
Europe (Eurochart Hot 100)	46
France (SNEP)	39
Germany (Media Control Charts)	20
Norway (VG-lista)	7
Switzerland (Schweizer Hitparade)	11
UK Singles (OCC)	44
UK Airplay (Music Week)	31

== Certifications ==
Region	Certification	Certified units/sales
Italy (FIMI) certification for sales occurred since January 2009 alone	Platinum	100,000^{‡}
^{‡} Sales+streaming figures based on certification alone.
