= Senza una donna =

1991 single by Zucchero and Paul Young

"Senza una donna (Without a Woman)"

Single by Zucchero and Paul Young
- B-side: "Madre dolcissima" (record); "Dunes of Mercy" (CD)
- Released: 18 March 1991
- Genre: Rock; blues; soft rock
- Length: 4:26
- Label: London
- Songwriters: Zucchero; Frank Musker
- Producers: Zucchero; Luciano Luisi; Corrado Rustici

Zucchero singles chronology
"Diavolo in me" (1989)	"Senza una donna (Without a Woman)" (1991)	"Diamante" (1992)

Music video
- "Senza una donna (Without a Woman)" on YouTube

Paul Young singles chronology
"Calling You" (1991)	"Senza una donna" (1991)	"Both Sides Now" (1991)

"Senza una donna" (IPA: [ˈsɛntsa una ˈdɔnna]) is a song written and performed by Italian singer and musician Zucchero on his fourth album, Blue's (1987). Originally recorded in Italian, in 1990 it was re-recorded in English with English singer and musician Paul Young. The English lyrics were contributed by Frank Musker. The song was then released as a single under the title "Senza una donna (Without a Woman)".

The English version of the song reached number four on the UK Singles Chart and number two on both the German Singles Chart and the French Singles Chart. It also topped the charts of Belgium, Norway, Quebec, and Sweden, selling more than 5,000,000 copies worldwide. It was also one of the most famous songs in Venezuela in 1991. "Senza una donna" was released along with two music videos: one for the solo version and another for the duet version.

== Critical reception ==
Larry Flick from Billboard magazine commented, "Italo pop star has outsold Madonna and Michael Jackson in his homeland. On this duet with Young, Zucchero makes his U.S. debut with a smooth and rhythmic ballad that is likely to find its initial audience at AC radio, though tune is charming enough to cross into mainstream pop territory." British Liverpool Echo described the song as "stylish", noting the "marvellously atmospheric setting" of the music video, "which was actually filmed in a church hall in Chiswick."

== Track listings ==
- 7-inch single
1. "Senza una donna (Without a Woman)"
2. "Madre dolcissima" by Zucchero
- CD single
1. "Senza una donna (Without a Woman)" (7 inch) — 4:26
2. "Dunes of Mercy" by Zucchero — 5:38
- CD maxi
1. "Senza una donna (Without a Woman)"
2. "Madre dolcissima" by Zucchero
3. "Dunes of Mercy" by Zucchero

== Charts ==
=== Weekly charts ===
Weekly chart performance for "Senza una donna"
Chart (1991–1992)	Peak position
Australia (ARIA)	42
Austria (Ö3 Austria Top 40)	8
Belgium (Ultratop 50 Flanders)	1
Canada Top Singles (RPM)	14
Denmark (IFPI)	3
Europe (Eurochart Hot 100)	1
Europe (European Hit Radio)	2
France (SNEP)	2
Germany (GfK)	2
Ireland (IRMA)	2
Iceland (Íslenski Listinn Topp 40)	1
Italy (Musica e dischi)	14
Luxembourg (Radio Luxembourg)	8
Netherlands (Dutch Top 40)	3
Netherlands (Single Top 100)	2
Norway (VG-lista)	1
Quebec (BAnQ)	1
Sweden (Sverigetopplistan)	1
Switzerland (Schweizer Hitparade)	2
UK Singles (Official Charts)	4
UK Airplay (Music Week)	4
US Adult Contemporary (Billboard)	23

=== Year-end charts ===
Year-end chart performance for "Senza una donna"
Chart (1991)	Position
Belgium (Ultratop)	5
Europe (European Hot 100 Singles)	6
Europe (European Hot 100 Airplay)	5
France (SNEP)	9
Germany (Media Control)	9
Germany (Media Control Airplay Hitparade)	7
Netherlands (Dutch Top 40)	26
Netherlands (Single Top 100)	21
Norway (VG-lista)	10
Sweden (Topplistan)	5
Switzerland (Schweizer Hitparade)	4
UK Singles (OCC)	59

== Certifications ==
Certifications for "Senza una donna"
Region	Certification	Certified units/sales
France (SNEP)	Gold	250,000^{*}
Italy (FIMI)	Gold	35,000^{‡}
Sweden (GLF)	Gold	25,000^{^}
United Kingdom	—	150,000
^{*} Sales figures based on certification alone.^{^} Shipments figures based on certification alone.^{‡} Sales+streaming figures based on certification alone.
