= Ballando con le Stelle series 9 =

Ballando con le Stelle
- Season 9
- Celebrity winner: Elisa Di Francisca
- Professional winner: Raimondo Todaro

Release
- Original network: RAI 1
- Original release: 5 October 2013

Series chronology
- ← Previous; Series 8 Next → Series 10

The ninth series of Ballando con le Stelle was broadcast from 5 October 2013 to December 2013 on RAI 1 and was presented by Milly Carlucci with Paolo Belli and his Big Band.

== Couples ==
Celebrity	Age	Occupation	Professional partner	Status
Alessandra Barzaghi	33	Television Presenter & Actress	Roberto Imperatori	Eliminated 1st on 5 October 2013
Massimo Boldi	68	Stand-up comedian & Actor	Elena Coniglio	Eliminated 2nd on 12 October 2013
Federico Costantini	24	I liceali Actor	Vera Bondareva	Eliminated 3rd on 19 October 2013
Jesus Luz	26	Brazilian Fashion model	Agnese Junkure	Eliminated 4th on 26 October 2013
Anna Oxa	52	Singer	Samuel Peron	Withdrew on 9 November 2013
Veronica Logan	44	L'ispettore Coliandro Actress	Maykel Fonts	Eliminated 7th on 17 November 2013
Luigi Mastrangelo	38	Volleyball World League player	Sara Di Vaira	Eliminated 8th on 1 December 2013
Roberto Farnesi	44	Actor	Samanta Togni	Fourth Place on 7 December 2013
Lea T.	32	Model	Simone Di Pasquale	Fourth Place on 7 December 2013
Lorenzo Flaherty	44	R.I.S. - Delitti imperfetti Actor	Natalia Titova	Fourth Place on 7 December 2013
Francesca Testasecca	22	Miss Italia 2010	Stefano Oradei	Third Place on 7 December 2013
Amaurys Pérez	37	Water polo player	Veera Kinnunen	Second Place on 7 December 2013
Elisa Di Francisca	29	Fencer	Raimondo Todaro	Winners on 7 December 2013

== Scoring Chart ==
Couple	Place	1	2	3	4	5	6	7	8	9	10	11
Elisa & Raimondo		22	33	26	IM	32	40	171				
Lorenzo & Natalia		17	24	19	IM	IM	72	31				
Amaurys & Veera		26	25	24	40	IM	77	75				
Gigi & Sara		27	19	31	IM	40	64	38				
Roberto & Samantha		12	16	21	28	IM	62	63				
Francesca & Stefano		29	24	30	34	36	34	10				
Veronika & Mykel	7	12	16	30	IM	27	48	29				
Anna & Samuel	8	39	39	37	IM	10	-	-				
Lea & Simone	9	27	20	22	33	39		9				
Jezus & Agnese	10	11	20	22	32			7				
Federico & Vera	11	9	15	19				6				
Massimo & Elena	12	14	9					4				
Alessandra & Roberto	13	11						3				

Red numbers indicate the lowest score for each week.
Green numbers indicate the highest score for each week.
indicates the couple eliminated that week.
indicates the returning couples that finished in the bottom two/three was saved by a second public vote.
indicates the returning couple that finished in the bottom three/four and was saved by the judges.
indicates the couple who quit the competition.
indicates the couple was voted back into the competition.
indicates the couple was voted back into the competition but then re-eliminated.
indicates the couple passed to the next round automatically.
indicates the winning couple.
indicates the runner-up couple.
indicates the third-place couple.

=== Highest and lowest scoring performances of the series ===
The best and worst performances in each dance according to the judges' marks are as follows:

Dance	Best dancer	Best score	Worst dancer	Worst score
Boogie Woogie	Jesus Luz	32	Lorenzo Flaherty	19
Cha Cha Cha	Francesca Testasecca	29	Veronika Logan	16
Charleston	Elisa Di Francisca	40	Lea T	20
Jive	Elisa Di Francisca	22	Alessandra Barzaghi	11
Merengue	Veronika Logan	27	Federico Costantini	9
Paso Doble	Elisa Di Francisca	40	Roberto Farnesi	12
Quickstep	Lea T	39	Lorenzo Flaherty	20
Rumba	Anna Oxa	39	Roberto Farnesi	30
Salsa	Lea T	27	Jesus Luz	11
Samba	Francesca Testasecca	36	Lea T	33
Tango	Amaurys Pérez	40	Lorenzo Flaherty	17
Waltz	Veronika Logan	48	Elisa Di Francisca	26

== Average Chart ==
Rank by average	Place	Couple	Total	Number of dances	Average
1.		Elisa & Raimondo	328	7	46.8
2.		Amaurys & Veera	267	7	38.1
3.		Lorenzo & Natalia	163	5	32.6
4.		Gigi & Sara	219	7	31.2
4.	8.	Anna & Samuel	125	4	31.2
6.		Francesca & Stefano	187	6	31.1
7.	9.	Lea & Simone	141	5	28.2
8.	7.	Veronika & Mykel	162	6	27.0
9.		Roberto & Samantha	177	7	25.2
10.	10.	Jezus & Agnese	85	4	21.2
11	11.	Federico & Vera	43	3	14.3
12.	12.	Massimo & Elena	23	2	11.5
13.	13.	Alessandra & Roberto	11	1	11.0

== Dance order ==
=== Week 1 ===
Individual judges scores in charts below (given in parentheses) are listed in this order from left to right: Ivan Zazzaroni, Fabio Canino, Carolyn Smith, Rafel Amargo and Guillermo Mariotto.

Couple	Score	Dance	Music
Elisa & Raimondo	22 (5,5,4,4,4)	Jive	"Blue Suede Shoes" - Elvis Presley
Lorenzo & Natalia	17 (4,4,3,3,3)	Tango	"El Choclo" - Julio Iglesias
Amaurys & Veera	26 (6,5,5,4,6)	Samba	"Le le low" - Arrow
Jezus & Agnese	11 (3,3,2,2,1)	Salsa	"La Luz del Ritmo" - Los Fabulosos Cadillacs
Alessandra & Roberto	11 (3,3,2,2,1)	Jive	"Candyman" - Christina Aguilera
Massimo & Elena	14 (4,3,2,3,2)	Jive	
Veronica & Mykel	12 (3,4,2,2,1)	Salsa	
