= Enzo Mirigliani =

Italian television personality (1917–2011)

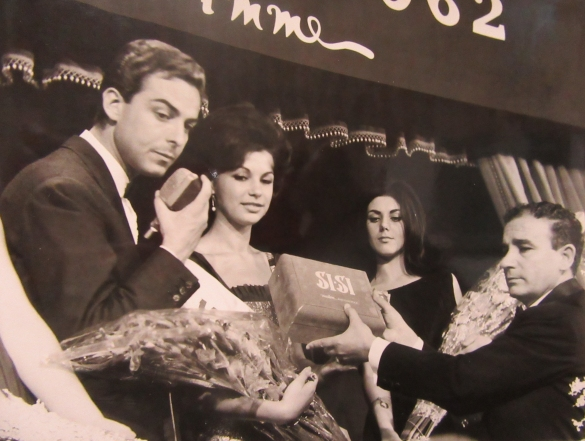
- Enzo Mirigliani at right in Miss Italia 1962, with Raffaella De Carolis and presenter Daniele Piombi
- Born: 22 April 1917; Santa Caterina dello Ionio, Calabria, Italy
- Died: 26 September 2011 (aged 94); Rome, Italy
- Occupation: Television personality
- Notable credit: Miss Italia beauty pageant
- Children: Two daughters

Enzo Mirigliani (22 April 1917 – 26 September 2011) was an Italian television personality and the head of the Miss Italia beauty pageant for over 50 years.

Born in Santa Caterina dello Ionio in Calabria, Italy, Mirigliani became the head of Miss Italy in 1959. Over the years, he created many other shows. He stepped down as head of Miss Italy in 2010, and died the following year at the Gemelli Clinic in Rome, aged 94. He was Commander in the Order of Merit of the Italian Republic.
