= Miss Universo Italia =

National beauty pageant competition in Italy

Miss Universe Italy Organization
- Formation: 2000; 26 years ago
- Type: Beauty pageant
- Headquarters: Rome
- Location: Italy
- Members: Miss Universe
- Official language: Italian
- President: Danilo Marzano

Miss Universe Italy is a national pageant that currently selects the Italian representative for the Miss Universe pageant. The pageant was first organized in 1951 and it is not related to Miss Italia, although some delegates have crossed over from one format to the other throughout the years.

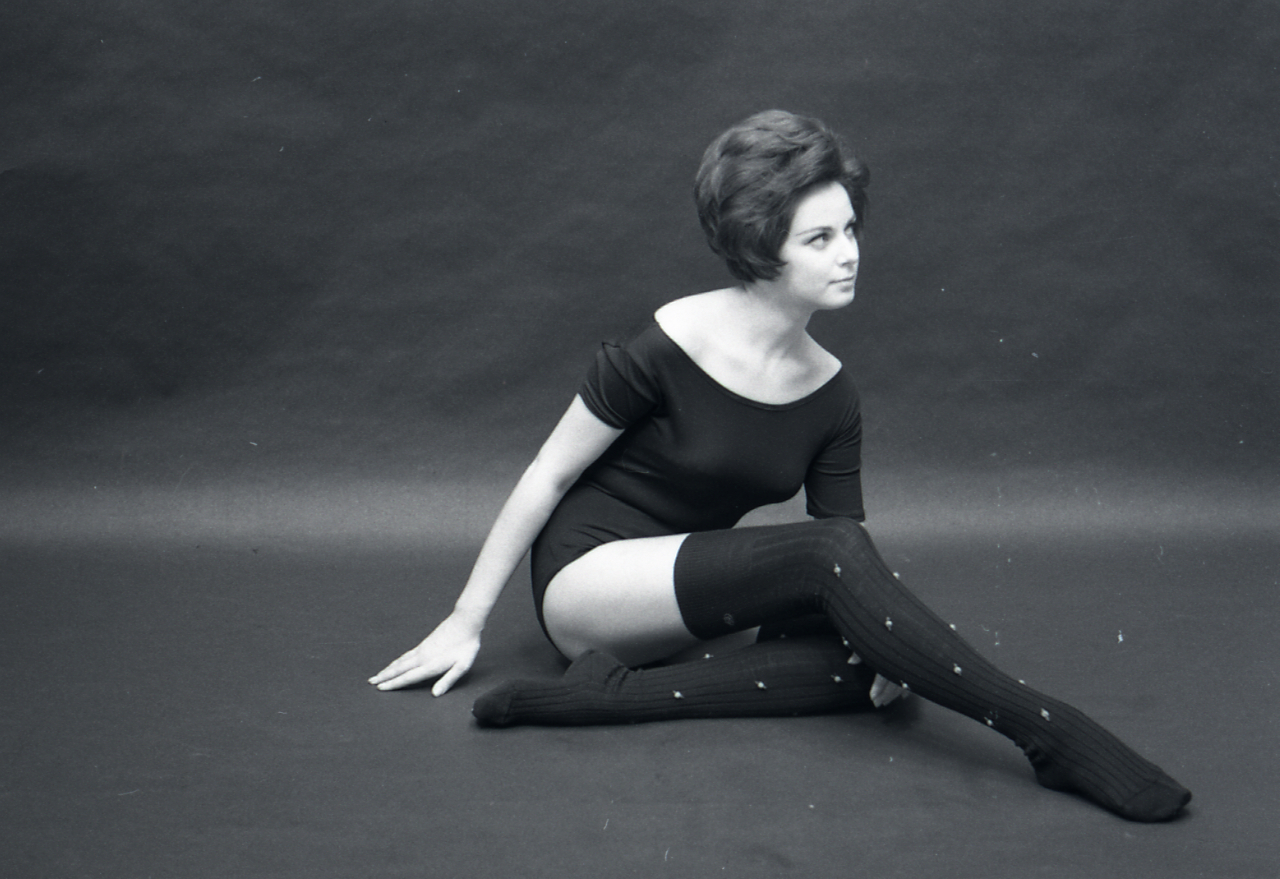
Erika Jorger (applied for Miss Universe Italy 1965) photographed by Paolo Monti in 1964

== History ==
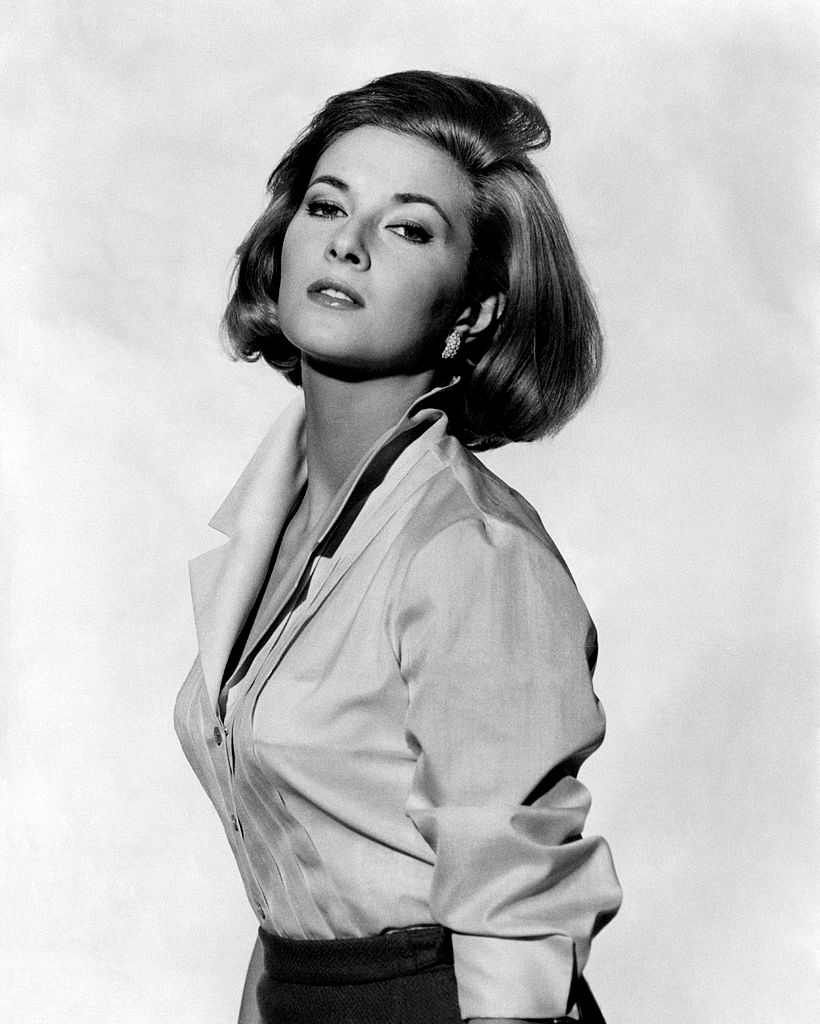
Daniela Bianchi was 1st runner-up at the Miss Universe 1960.

Since 1951, the official winner of Miss Italy represented at the Miss Universe until 1999 with the exception of a few select years in which a delegate was selected by casting or an independent pageant.

In 2005, Miss Universo Italia was created. From 2000 to 2004, the Italian representative was selected by the now defunct The Miss for Miss Universe pageant. Maria Teresa Francville had already won the right to represent Italy that year by virtue of winning The Miss for Miss Universe. When that pageant lost the franchise and was discontinued, she entered the newly created Miss Universo Italia competition and won again.

The most notable winners of the Miss Universo Italia pageant are Claudia Ferraris, who finished 9th at Miss Universe 2008, and Valentina Bonariva, who advanced to the Top 15 at the Miss Universe 2014 pageant.

== Region formats ==
At Miss Universo Italia, candidates traditionally wear sashes representing their regions. There are 20 regions in Italy and each region has internal selection before coming to Miss Universo Italia. The final results include a Second Runner-up, a First Runner-up, and ultimately, the Miss Universo Italia winner.

- Miss Abruzzo
- Miss Aosta Valley
- Miss Apulia
- Miss Basilicata
- Miss Calabria
- Miss Campania
- Miss Emilia-Romagna
- Miss Friuli-Venezia Giulia
- Miss Lazio
- Miss Liguria
- Miss Lombardy
- Miss Marche
- Miss Molise
- Miss Piedmont
- Miss Sardinia
- Miss Sicily
- Miss Trentino-South Tyrol
- Miss Tuscany
- Miss Umbria
- Miss Veneto

== Titleholders ==
=== Miss Universe Italy 2000—Present ===
- : Declared as Winner
- : Ended as runner-up or top 5/6 qualification
- : Ended as one of the finalists or semifinalists
- : Ended as special awards winner

After 1999 Miss Universe Italy separated to be an independent contest to crown a winning title at Miss Universe. On occasion, when the winner does not qualify (due to age) for either contest, a runner-up is sent.

Year	Region	Miss Universe Italy	Placement at Miss Universe	Special awards	Notes
Danilo Marzano directorship — a franchise holder to Miss Universe from 2022
2026	Lombardy	Giada Folcia	TBA		
2025	Lazio	Lucilla Nori	Unplaced		
2024	Marche	Glelany Cavalcante	Unplaced		
2023	Marche	Carmen Panepinto	Unplaced		
2022	Trentino-Alto Adige/Südtirol	Virginia Stablum	Unplaced		
Marco Ciriaci directorship — a franchise holder to Miss Universe between 2018―2021
2021	Campania	Caterina Di Fuccia	Unplaced		
2020	Sicily	Viviana Vizzini	Unplaced		
2019	Campania	Sofia Trimarco	Unplaced		
2018	Lazio	Erica De Matteis	Unplaced		
Edward Walson directorship — a franchise holder to Miss Universe between 2016―2017
2017	Campania	Maria Polverino	Unplaced		
2016	Campania	Sophia Sergio	Unplaced		
Concorso di Belleza Miss Universe Italy — Max Baratono directorship — a franchise holder to Miss Universe between 2007―2015
2015	Apulia	Giada Pezzaioli	Unplaced		
2014	Lombardy	Valentina Bonariva	Top 15		
2013	Calabria	Luna Voce	Unplaced		
2012	Sicily	Grazia Maria Pinto	Unplaced		
2011	Lazio	Elisa Torrini	Unplaced		
2010	Piedmont	Jessica Cecchini	Unplaced		
2009	Tuscany	Laura Valenti	Unplaced		
2008	Lombardy	Claudia Ferraris	Top 10		
2007	Emilia-Romagna	Valentina Massi	Unplaced		
The Miss Universe for Miss Universe Italy — Clarissa Burt directorship — a franchise holder to Miss Universe between 2000―2005
Did not compete in 2006
2005	Veneto	María Teresa Francville	Unplaced		The Miss for Miss Universe Italy 2005; competed in both The Miss for Miss Universe contest and Miss Universe Italy contest, which was created when The Miss for Miss Universe lost the franchise.
2004	Lombardy	Laia Manetti	Unplaced	Miss Congeniality	
2003	Veneto	Silvia Ceccon	Unplaced		
2002	Veneto	Anna Rigon	Unplaced		
2001	Lombardy	Stefania Maria	Unplaced		
2000	Lazio	Annalisa Guadalupi	Unplaced		

=== Miss Italia 1952—1999 ===
- : Declared as Winner
- : Ended as runner-up or top 5/6 qualification
- : Ended as one of the finalists or semifinalists
- : Ended as special awards winner

Miss Italy has started to send a Winner to Miss Universe from 1952. In 1999 Miss Italia Organization dropped the Miss Universe franchise for Italy.

Year	Region	Miss Italia	Placement at Miss Universe	Special awards	Notes
Enzo Mirigliani directorship — a franchise holder to Miss Universe between 1975―1999
1999	Emilia-Romagna	Gloria Bellicchi	Unplaced		
1998	Calabria	Claudia Trieste	Unplaced		
1997	Tuscany	Denny Mendez	Top 6		
1996	Sicily	Anna Valle	Unplaced		
1995	Sardinia	Alessandra Meloni	Unplaced		
1994	Lazio	Arianna David	Top 10		
1993	Liguria	Elisa Jacassi	Unplaced		
Did not compete in 1992
1991	Calabria	Maria Pia Biscotti	Unplaced		
1990	Veneto	Annamaria Malipiero	Unplaced		
1989	Veneto	Cristiana Bertasi	Unplaced		
1988	Liguria	Simona Ventura	Unplaced		
1987	Campania	Roberta Capua	1st Runner-up		
1986	Friuli-Venezia Giulia	Susanna Huckstep	Unplaced	Miss Photogenic	
1985	Sardinia	Beatrice Papi	Unplaced		
1984	Piedmont	Raffaella Baracchi	Unplaced		
1983	Lombardy	Federica Moro	Top 12		
1982	Abruzzo	Cinzia De Ponti	2nd Runner-up		
1981	Sicily	Anna Kanakis	Unplaced		
1980	Veneto	Loredana Del Santo	Unplaced		
1979	Sicily	Elvira Puglisi	Unplaced		Appointed — Elvira was 1st Runner-up at Miss Italia 1977.
1978	Lazio	Andreina Mazzotti	Unplaced		
1977	Sicily	Paola Bresciano	Unplaced		
1976	Lombardy	Diana Scapolan	Unplaced		Appointed — Diana was 1st Runner-up at Miss Italia 1970.
1975	Friuli-Venezia Giulia	Diana Salvador	Unplaced		
SS 33 Brands directorship "Miss Italia Universo" — a franchise holder to Miss Universe between 1971―1974
1974	Lazio	Loretta Persichetti	Unplaced		
1973	Lombardy	Antonella Barci	Unplaced		
1972	Friuli-Venezia Giulia	Isabella Specia	Unplaced		
1971	Lombardy	Mara Palvarini	Unplaced		
Enzo Mirigliani directorship — a franchise holder to Miss Universe between 1967―1970
1970	Lazio	Anna Zamboni	Top 15		
1969	Lazio	Diana Coccorese	Unplaced		
1968	Lazio	Cristina Businari	Unplaced		
1967	Veneto	Paola Rossi	Top 15		Appointed — Paola was 2nd Runner-up at Miss Italia 1966.
Curzio Malaperte directorship "Miss Italia Universo" — a franchise holder to Miss Universe between 1953―1966
1966	Campania	Paola Bassolino	Unplaced		
1965	Lombardy	Erika Jorger	Unplaced		
1964	Veneto	Emanuela Stramanna	Top 10		
1963	Marche	Gianna Serra	Top 15		
1962	Emilia-Romagna	Isa Stoppi	Unplaced		
1961	Lazio	Viviana Romano	Unplaced		
1960	Lazio	Daniela Bianchi	1st Runner-up		
1959	Lombardy	Maria Grazia Buccella	Unplaced		
1958	Lazio	Clara Coppola	Unplaced		
1957	Veneto	Valeria Fabrizi	Top 15		
1956	Lazio	Rossana Galli	4th Runner-up		
1955	Lazio	Elena Fancera	Unplaced		
1954	Lombardy	Maria Teresa Paliani	Top 16		
1953	Lazio	Rita Stazzi	Top 16		Miss Universo Italia 1953 (separate contest).
Dino Villani directorship "Miss Cinema Italia" — a franchise holder to Miss Universe in 1952
1952	Lombardy	Giovanna Mazzotti	Unplaced		

== Gallery ==
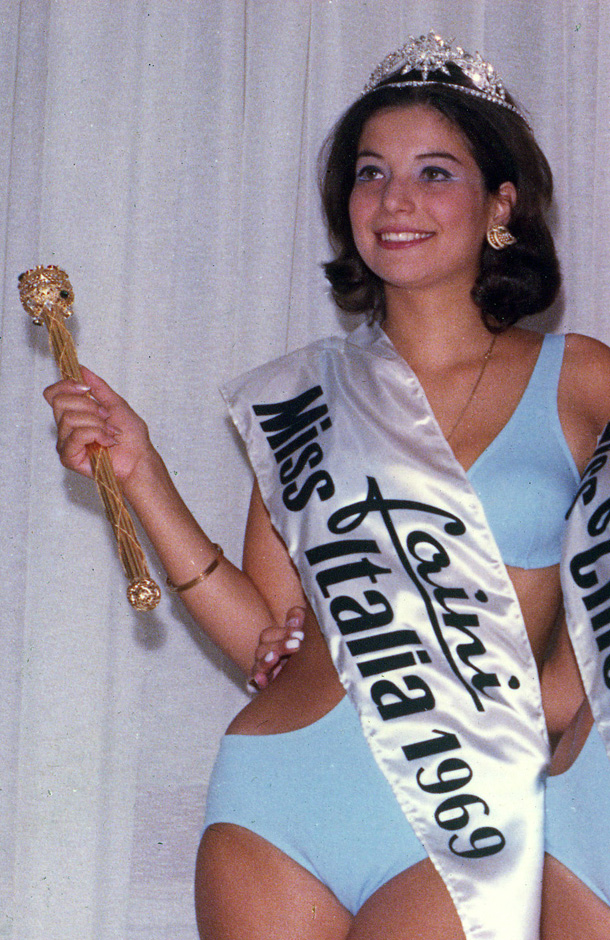
Anna Zamboni (applied in 1970)[photographed in 1969]

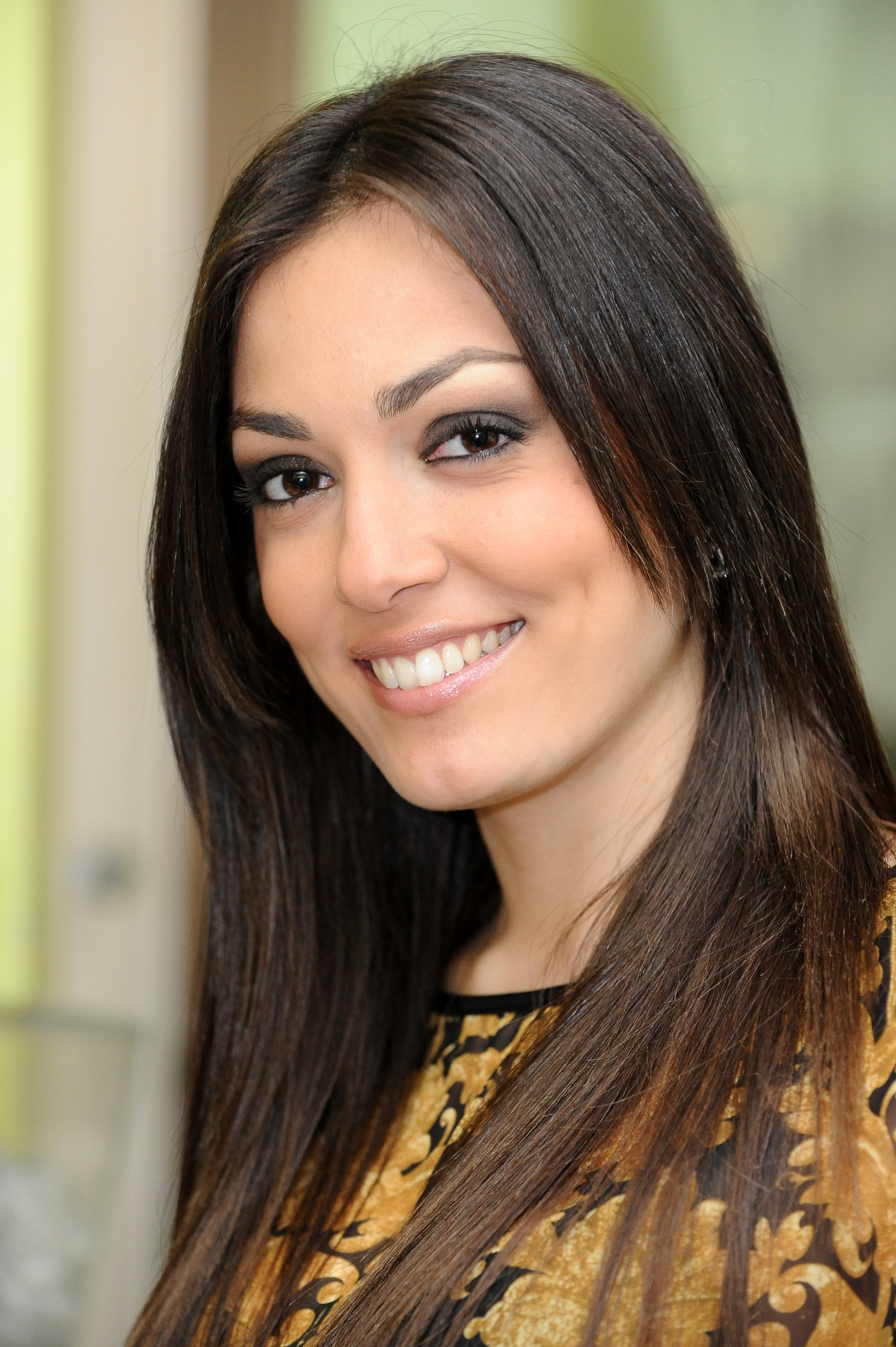
Grazia Maria Pinto (applied in 2012) [photographed in 2013]

== See also ==
- Miss Italia

== Official website ==
- Official website
