= Miss Universo Italia 2011 =

- Date: June 30, 2011
- Presenters: Eleonoire Casalegno, Beppe Braida
- Entertainment: Flavia Vento, Francesco Paoloantoni, Tony Colombo, Carmen Masola
- Venue: Forio, Ischia, Italy
- Entrants: 40
- Placements: 10
- Withdrawals: Valle d'Aosta, Liguria, Trentino Alto Adige, Friuli-Venezia Giulia, Umbria, Marche, Abruzzo, Molise, Basilicata
- Winner: Elisa Torrini; Lazio

The Miss Universo Italia 2011 pageant was held on June 30, 2011. The winner was Elisa Torrini, contestant of Lazio; she will represent Italy at Miss Universe 2011, which will take place in Brazil on September 12, 2011.

== Results ==
=== Placements ===
Final results	Contestant
Miss Universe Italy 2011	Lazio – Elisa Torrini
1st runner-up	Piemonte – Fiorella Dominici
2nd runner-up	Lombardia – Elisa Selvaggia Folli
3rd runner-up	Sardegna – Monica Kostova
4th runner-up	Lazio – Giulia Lupetti
Top 10	Campania – Antonietta Coppola; Campania – Maria Cristina Vitiello; Puglia – Rosa Maria Avvisati; Campania – Miriam Forte; Lazio – Guendalina Bianchetti

== Delegates ==
Number	Region	Contestant
01	Piemonte	Jessica Amà
02	Sicilia	Claudia Amante
03	Sardegna	Stefania Arca
04	Puglia	Rosa Maria Avvisati
05	Emilia-Romagna	Iris Berardi
06	Lazio	Guendalina Bianchetti
07	Sardegna	Francesca Cavalieri
08	Campania	Roberta Ciampa
09	Piemonte	Elisa Coha
10	Campania	Antonietta Coppola
11	Veneto	Elisa Cristofoletti
12	Sicilia	Micaela De Marco
13	Lazio	Claudia De Magno
14	Piemonte	Fiorella Dominici
15	Lombardia	Elisa Selvaggia Folli
16	Campania	Miriam Forte
17	Toscana	Giulia Giammanossi
18	Sicilia	Dalila Gatto
19	Calabria	Tania Giordano
20	Campania	Ludovica Iervolino
21	Piemonte	Aurora Jelalli
22	Sardegna	Monica Kostova
23	Puglia	Valentina Lanotte
24	Lazio	Giulia Lupetti
25	Lombardia	Chiara Montemarano
26	Sicilia	Stefania Monterosso
27	Emilia-Romagna	Eleonora Peruzzini
28	Puglia	Valentina Pierini
29	Veneto	Rossella Porro
30	Campania	Giusy Quirino
31	Puglia	Sabrina Romano
32	Sardegna	Serena Santoli
33	Lazio	Stephanie Santoromito
34	Campania	Sophia Sergio
35	Lazio	Elisa Torrini
36	Toscana	Luisa Vattiato
37	Lombardia	Nicole Vergani
38	Campania	Maria Cristina Vitiello
39	Veneto	Vanessa Zanardo
40	Piemonte	Nada Zhiti

== Judges ==
The following celebrities judged the final competition

- Nina Morić, Croatian model, who work in Italy
- Sarodj Bertin, Miss Haiti Universe 2010
- Lory del Santo, Italian actress and showgirl;
- Marco Balestri, Italian television writer and radio host
- Veridiana Mallmann, Italian-Brazilian showgirl, ex velina
- Francesca Cipriani, Italian showgirl, winner of the Italian reality "La pupa e il secchione 2"
- Angelo Rizzo, Italian film director
- Enzo Odoguardi, Italian producer
- Yulame Rodriguez del Rey, showgirl
- Giulio Cesare Senatore, Italian entrepreneur
- Antonio Impagliazzo, Italian entrepreneur
- Umberto Lucio Amore, Italian entrepreneur

== Entertainment ==
- Flavia Vento, Italian showgirl
- Francesco Paoloantoni, Italian comic
- Tony Colombo, Neapolitan singer
- Carmen Masola, singer; winner of "Italia's Got Talent"
