= Risaliti =

Risaliti is a surname. Notable people with this surname include:

- Rachele Risaliti (born 1995), Italian model and beauty pageant
- Renato Risaliti (1935–2020), Italian art historian and writer
- Riccardo Risaliti (born 1939), Italian pianist
