= Sofia Trimarco =

Italian beauty pageant titleholder

- Born: Sofia Marilú Trimarco; 11 February 1999 (age 27); Buccino, Italy
- Education: Libera Università Internazionale degli Studi Sociali Guido Carli
- Height: 186 cm (6 ft 1 in)
- Beauty pageant titleholder
- Title: Miss Universo Italia 2019
- Hair color: Black
- Eye color: Brown
- Major competitions: Miss Italia 2018 (withdrew); Miss Universo Italia 2019 (winner); Miss Universe 2019 (unplaced)

Sofia Marilú Trimarco (born 11 February 1999 in Buccino) is an Italian beauty pageant titleholder who was crowned Miss Universo Italia 2019. She will represent Italy at the Miss Universe 2019 competition.

== Early life and education ==
Sofia Marilú Trimarco was born on February 11, 1999, and raised in Buccino. She works as a law student at the Libera Università Internazionale degli Studi Sociali Guido Carli.

== Pageantry ==
=== Miss Italia 2018 ===
Trimarco competed at the Miss Italia 2018 pageant on September 17, 2018, in Milan but she did not participate.

=== Miss Universo Italia 2019 ===
Trimarco was crowned Miss Universo Italia 2019 pageant on August 25, 2019, at the Cinecittà World in Rome. She was crowned by outgoing titleholder Erica De Matteis.

=== Miss Universe 2019 ===
As Miss Universo Italia, Trimarco represented Italy at Miss Universe 2019 but did not place.

Awards and achievements
Preceded by Erica De Matteis	Miss Universo Italia; 2019	Succeeded by Viviana Vizzini
