= Jessica Cecchini =

Italian model

- Born: Jessica Cecchini
- Beauty pageant titleholder
- Title: Miss Piemonte 2007; Miss Universo Italia 2010
- Hair color: Brown
- Eye color: Green
- Major competitions: • Miss Italia 2007 • Miss Universo Italia 2010 (winner) • Miss Universe 2010 (Unplaced)

Jessica Cecchini is an Italian model and beauty pageant titleholder who the winner of the Miss Universo Italia 2010 pageant that was held at the Teatro Antico Greco-Romano in Taormina, Sicily on 1 July 2010. For the first time ever, the pageant streamed via webcast worldwide on twww.tv. Jessica beat out 27 other contestants and won the right to represent Italy at the Miss Universe 2010 pageant in Las Vegas, Nevada, where she failed to advance to the Top 15. No Italian woman has ever won the Miss Universe crown, but the number of semifinalists and finalists (including 1st runners-up Daniela Bianchi in 1960 and Roberta Capua in 1987) makes Italy statistically the most successful country never to have won the pageant.

Jessica stands 5 ft 10 in (1.78 m) and she's a Pisces. She's a student at the Istituto Tecnico Salute Individuale, and she enjoys music and volleyball. Her dream is to someday work in the fashion industry or in show business.
