= Valentina Bonariva =

Italian model (born 1989)

- Born: Valentina Bonariva; 1 May 1989 (age 37); Solaro, Lombardy, Italy
- Height: 5 ft 8 in (1.73 m)
- Beauty pageant titleholder
- Title: Miss Universo Italia 2014
- Hair color: Dark blonde
- Eye color: Green
- Major competitions: • Miss Italia 2013; (Top 21); • Miss Universo Italia 2014; (Winner); • Miss Universe 2014; (Top 15)

Valentina Bonariva (born 1 May 1989) is an Italian dancer, model and beauty pageant titleholder who was crowned Miss Universo Italia 2014 and represented her country at Miss Universe 2014 and placed Top 15.

== Early life ==
Bonariva is a dancer. She was FIDS (Italian Dance Sport Federation).

== Pageantry ==
=== Miss Italia 2013 ===
Bonariva represented Tuscany at Miss Italia 2013 and awarded as Miss Fair Play.

=== Miss Universo Italia 2014 ===
Bonariva was crowned as Miss Universo Italia 2014 on 23 November 2014.

=== Miss Universe 2014 ===
Bonariva represented Italy at Miss Universe 2014. She was placed in the Top 15.

Awards and achievements
Preceded by Luna Voce	Miss Universo Italia; 2014	Succeeded by Giada Pezzaioli
