= Masciotta =

Masciotta is an Italian surname. Notable people with the surname include:

- Aldo Masciotta (1909–1996), Italian fencer
- Edelfa Chiara Masciotta (born 1984), Italian television personality and former beauty pageant titleholder
- Giovanna Masciotta (born 1942), Italian fencer
