= Lisa Hunt =

American singer

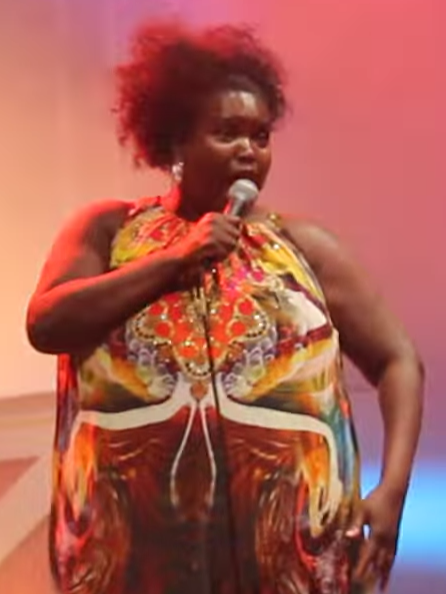

Background information
- Born: Lisa Hunt
- Origin: New York City, U.S.
- Genres: Funk; soul; R&B; gospel; jazz; rock and roll; electronic; disco; house
- Instrument: Vocals
- Years active: 1980s–present
- Labels: Polydor; Nature Beat Music; Phatgirl Records

Lisa Hunt is an American Byron Bay-based soul singer. Hunt rose to fame in Italy as an associated act and backup singer of Zucchero Fornaciari, touring with him from the late 1980s until the 2000s. She has been particularly praised for her collaboration on Zucchero's fifth album Oro Incenso & Birra, and for her subsequent performance in Zucchero's first live album Live at the Kremlin, particularly for her solo in the song "Madre dolcissima". Hunt recorded several songs with Fornaciari, including "Something Strong", from the soundtrack album Snack Bar Budapest. She has released a total four albums, the first, A Little Piece of Magic, with Polydor.

Although better known for her Funk, Soul and Rock style, Hunt also collaborated with several electronic dance music acts, and appeared on many house and electronic records. In January 2005, the single "The Joint is Jumpin'" featuring Hunt peaked at number 5 on the United States Billboard Dance Club Songs. The single "Unity", a collaboration of John Rizzo, Hunt, and Wanda Houston, peaked at number 27 on the same chart in 2008.

Beside Zucchero, Hunt performed with Pavarotti, Andrea Bocelli, Ray Charles, Eric Clapton, James Brown, Joe Cocker, Miles Davis, Macy Gray, Tina Turner, Bryan May, Dolores O'Riordan and Alen Vitasović.

Hunt achieved fame and success in Italy, where she has been credited as "one of the most incredible voices of the past years." In Italy, she is said to have performed one of the most intense interpretations of "Imagine".

== Early life ==
Hunt reportedly was born in the state of New York. She began singing in the Afro American tradition of gospel music. She studied music at The City College of New York. At some point she moved to England, since she was discovered by Zucchero Fornaciari while singing in the street at Covent Garden, London, which is famous for its market and the street artists singing in the square. Zucchero met her fortuitously, in "a miraculous way." He had lost his flight back to Italy, however, he ended up signing one of Italy's "most incredible voices in the past few years." After he came across her in Covent Garden, Zucchero observed her show for an hour, filming her with a handycam. Fornaciari has stated "I met her fortuitously at Covent Garden, as she was singing in the street there, with people dropping coins for her... I approached her and said 'You are too good, you absolutely have to come to Italy.'" Fornaciari presented himself and asked Hunt if she would like to sing in his band, taking her phone number. Within a month she was in Italy, appearing in Zucchero's videoclip of Con le mani the same month.

She toured with Zucchero as a backup singer and worked with him for over 15 years. Hunt collaborated on Zucchero's fifth studio album Oro Incenso & Birra, and is best remembered for the single Madre dolcissima. She was also praised for her performance in Live at the Kremlin, Zucchero's first live album. Zucchero's was the first concert by an occidental artist in the Soviet Union after the fall of the wall.

In the 1990s, Hunt attempted for the first time to go solo. In 1989 she released "A Little Piece of Magic", which was released on January 12, 1990, in Italy. Two songs in the album are collaborations with Zucchero. Although in Italy she was chiefly known for her interpretations of songs by other artists, the album didn't contain her famous cover of Imagine, and it actually contained only one cover song across, namely "Lady Marmalade". Hunt has stated that she didn't want any covers at all in it, but the producers insisted to have at least one cover of a popular song in the album. Two songs were composed by Zucchero, one, "In my secret heart", was composed by David Sancious. "In my secret heart" features Manu Katché, bassist Pino Palladino and Zucchero. Hunt went on to release three more albums: Can You Feel It (1997), Forever Soul (2000), and The Very Best of Forever Soul (2003).

In 1999 she collaborated with American-born Australian singer Mark Lizotte (aka Diesel) on the song "Come Down," from Diesel's sixth studio album Soul Lost Companion.

As of 2015, she reportedly sold a total of one million copies of her own CDs.

Hunt has appeared on several records by British electronic dance music group Lovestation. She collaborated with several musicians in Australia and the United States. The single "The Joint is Jumpin'" featuring Hunt peaked at number 12 on the United States Billboard Dance Club Songs (January 8, 2005). A remix of the song ("The Joint is Jumpin' - J. Budz/ Blueroom/ Twisted Dee & Jayito Mixes") peaked at number 5 on the same chart on January 22, 2005. The song was featured on the TV series Queer as Folk.

John Rizzo's single "Unity", released in 2008 and featuring Hunt and Wanda Houston, peaked at number 27 on the United States Billboard Dance Club Songs.

In addition to her participation in the soundtrack of Snack Bar Budapest in the 1980s (with "Something Strong" featuring Hunt and Zucchero), Hunt has contributed vocals to the soundtrack of HBO's Subway Stories, and collaborated on HBO's adaptation of Goodnight Moon, featuring Lauryn Hill and Susan Sarandon.

Hunt has appeared in a number of off-Broadway musicals, including Dreamgirls, Robert Wilson's Medea and Ballad for Bimshire by Susan Watson Turner. It has been stated that the ballad of the latter show was "stirringly delivered" by Hunt.

== Personal life ==
Hunt has stated that her favorite city "in Italy and in the world" is Venice.

In February 2021 she was fined $5000 for "alleged COVID-19 breaches by patrons."

In December 1989 she married an Australian rock guitarist in her native New York City.

== Discography ==
=== Studio albums ===
List of studio albums, with chart positions
Title	Details	Peak chart positions
Title	Details	ITA
A Little Piece of Magic	Released: 1989; Label: Polydor-Universal; Formats: Digital download, vinyl, CD	—
Can You Feel It	Released: 1997; Label: Nature Beat Music; Formats: Digital download, vinyl, CD	—
Forever Soul	Released: 2000; Label: Phatgirl Records; Formats: Digital download, vinyl, CD	—
The Very Best of Forever Soul	Released: 2003; Label: Phatgirl Records; Formats: Digital download, vinyl, CD	—

=== As a featured artist ===
List of albums, with selected chart positions and certifications
Title	Details	Peak chart positions										Certifications
Title	Details	ITA	AUT	BEL (FL)	BEL (WA)	FRA	GER	NLD	SWE	SWI	UK	Certifications
Snack Bar Budapest: Music from the Motion Picture (Zucchero featuring Lisa Hunt)	Released: 11 November 1988; Label: Polydor; Formats: LP, cassette, CD	14	—	—	—	—	—	—	—	—	—	
Oro incenso e birra (Zucchero, with songs featuring Eric Clapton, Lisa Hunt, Jimmy Smith and others)	Released: 13 June 1989; Label: Polydor; Formats: LP, cassette, CD	1	—	—	—	17	—	36	50	1	—	ITA: 9× Platinum; FRA: Platinum; SWI: Platinum
Live at the Kremlin (Zucchero, with songs featuring Randy Crawford, Lisa Hunt, James Thompson and others)	Released: 4 November 1991; Label: Polydor; Formats: LP, cassette, CD	—	—	—	—	—	—	—	—	—	—	
Spirito DiVino (Zucchero, with songs featuring Clarence Clemons, Lisa Hunt, Sheila E. and others)	Released: 27 May 1995; Label: Polydor; Formats: LP, cassette, CD	1	—	15	14	4	17	29	—	3	—	ITA: 11× Platinum and 2× Diamond; SWI: Platinum; FRA: Platinum; BEL: Platinum; EU: Platinum

== Singles ==
=== As lead artist ===
List of singles as lead artist, showing year released and album name
Title	Year	Peak chart positions	Certification	Album
Title	Year	ITA	Certification	Album
"Something Strong" (featuring Zucchero)	1988	—		Snack Bar Budapest: Music from the Motion Picture
"Free Man" (written by Hunt and Zucchero)	1989	—		A Little Piece of Magic
"A Little Piece of Magic"	1989	—		A Little Piece of Magic
"Lady Marmelade (Radio Mix) (Voulez Vous Coucher Avec Moi Ce Soir?)"	1990	—		A Little Piece of Magic
"Fires in the Rain"	1990	—		A Little Piece of Magic
"I Gave You All This Love"	1991	—		Non-album single

=== As featured artist ===
List of singles as featured artist and year released
Title	Year	Peak chart positions			Certification	Album
Title	Year	US	NLD	AUS	Certification	Album
"Madre dolcissima" (Zucchero featuring Lisa Hunt)	1990	—	49	—		Oro Incenso & Birra
"Love Come Rescue Me" (Lovestation featuring Lisa Hunt)	1992	—	—	—		
"Love is Drug" (Ekko featuring Lisa Hunt)	1994	—	—	22		Non-album single
"The Joint is Jumpin'"	2004	12	—	—		Non-album single
"The Joint is Jumpin' (J. Budz/ Blueroom/ Twisted Dee & Jayito Mixes)"	2005	5	—	—		Non-album single
"Unity" (John Rizzo featuring Lisa Hunt and Wanda Houston)	2008	27	—	—		Non-album single
