= Grazia Maria Pinto =

Italian model (born 1988)

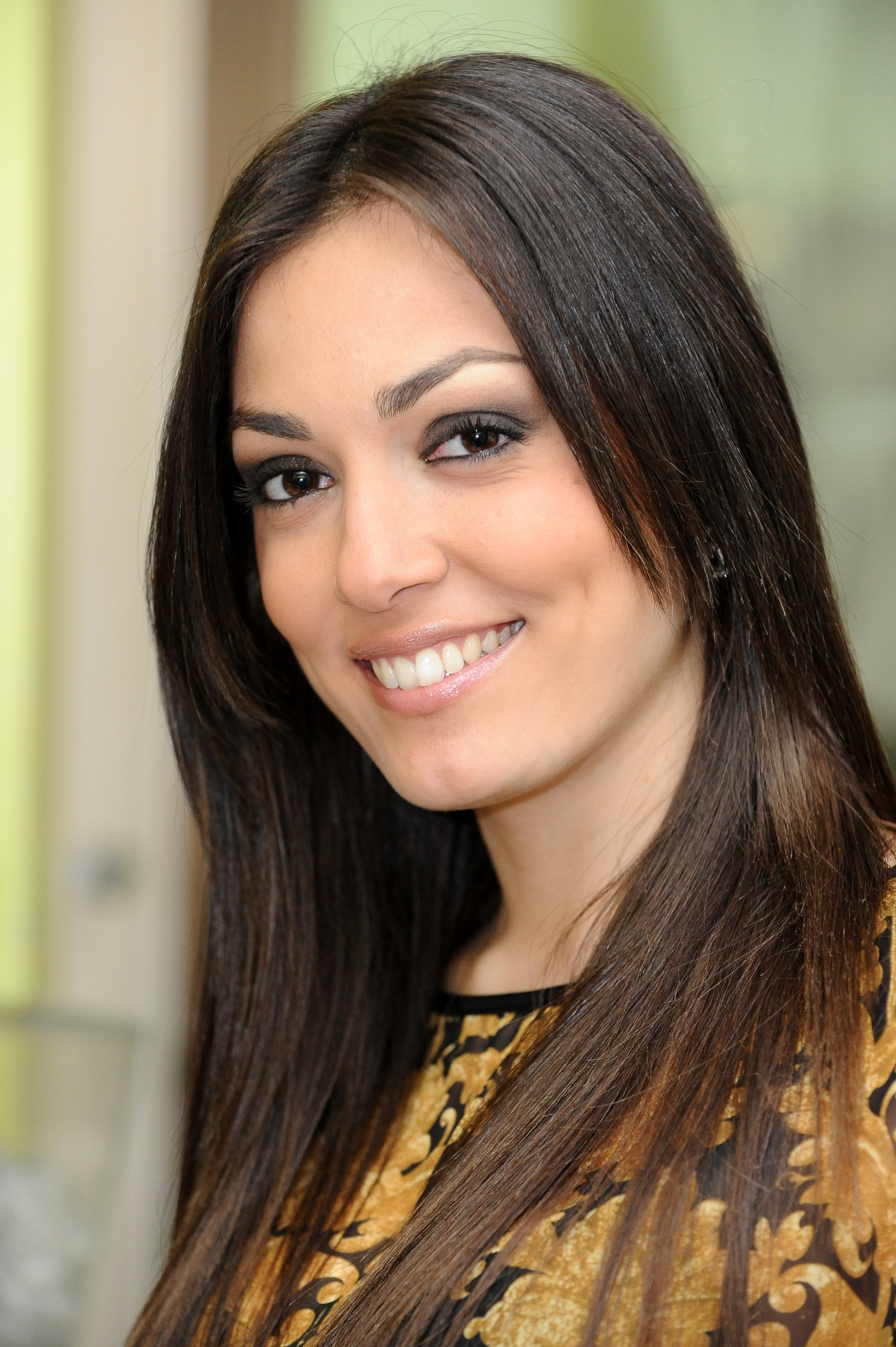
- Grazia Maria Pinto in January 2013
- Born: Grazia Maria Pinto; 22 April 1988 (age 38); Catania; Sicily, Italy
- Height: 5 ft 9.5 in (1.77 m)
- Beauty pageant titleholder
- Title: Miss Universe Italy 2012
- Hair color: Brown
- Eye color: Brown
- Major competitions: • Miss Universo Italia 2012 (winner) • Miss Universe 2012 (Unplaced)

Grazia Maria Pinto (born Catania, 22 April 1988) is an Italian model and beauty pageant titleholder. She was crowned Miss Universo Italia 2012 on 31 August 2012 at the Rainbow MagicLand Theme Park in Rome. She is 1.77 m tall (5'9.5"). By winning the title, Grazia Maria earned the right to represent her country at the Miss Universe 2012 pageant.

As part of her prize package, Grazia Maria won a week-long stay in Panama, from 15 to 22 October, to attend the prestigious Katty Pulido International Academy, where she received intensive training in all areas of competition to aid her preparation for the Miss Universe pageant.

== Notes ==
Awards and achievements
| Preceded by Elisa Torrini | Miss Universe Italy; 2012 | Succeeded by Luna Voce |
