= Claudia Andreatti =

Miss Italia 2006

Claudia Andreatti (born 1987) was Miss Italia 2006. She comes from Pergine Valsugana, (Trento), Italy. She replaced the outgoing Edelfa Chiara Masciotta Miss Italia 2005. Before becoming Miss Italia she spent a year in Texas to study English.

== Miss Italia 2006 ==
Before the last vote, Claudia Andreatti was reported saying to want "to give a dream to my region, that has never had a Miss Italia."

For her strong and aggressive character, her fresh appeal and her elegance, she has been hailed by the Italian press as new representative of modern Italian women. Claudia Andreatti speaks English fluently, after spending one year in the United States. She declares herself «happily single» because «better alone than badly accompanied» (tr. from an Italian expression). After graduating from high school, she would like to attend the school of Public Relationships at the University of Milan, although she might also receive job offers in show business.

== Calendar 2007 ==
She is the undisputed face protagonist of the new calendar of Miss Italia 2007 signed by Giammarco Cheregato. In the work entitled "Dream to be a star", Claudia Andreatti appears in a role once interpreted by Claudia Cardinale, Silvana Mangano, Sophia Loren, Laura Antonelli, Gina Lollobrigida and Monica Vitti.

== Eurovision Song Contest 2016 ==
In 2016, she announced the votes of the Italian jury during the final of the 61st edition of the Eurovision Song Contest.

== Television ==
- 2007-2016 : Announcer Rai 1
- 2012 : Ballando con le stelle Rai 1
- 2016- : Guest Mezzogiorno in Famiglia Rai 2.
