= Alice Sabatini =

Italian model and basketball player, Miss Italia 2015

- Born: 12 October 1996 (age 29); Orbetello, Italy
- Occupations: Model; basketball player (formerly)
- Height: 1.78 m (5 ft 10 in) or 1.80 m (5 ft 11 in)
- Beauty pageant titleholder
- Title: Miss Italia 2015
- Hair color: Brown
- Major competition: Miss Italia 2015 (winner)

Alice Sabatini (born 12 October 1996) is an Italian model, beauty pageant titleholder, and former basketball player who was the winner of Miss Italia 2015.

== Biography ==
Sabatini was born in Orbetello (Tuscany), and grew up in Montalto di Castro (Lazio).

Between 2011 and 2015 she played as a forward on the Santa Marinella (IT) professional basketball team; the team was eventually promoted to Serie A2 in 2014.

She participated in the 2013 edition of Miss Grand Prix, winning the Miss Tisanoreica band.

=== Miss Italia 2015 ===
In 2015 Sabatini participated in the Miss Italia competition. During the contest she unexpectedly achieved notoriety when she was asked in which period of history she would have liked to live in, to which she replied "In '42", much to the spectators' shock. Her reasoning was that, as a woman, she would have experienced World War II without having to fight in it. She eventually won the crown on 21 September, but was heavily ridiculed for her answer.

A few days after winning the title, Sabatini was asked during an interview about her favorite Italian historical figure, to which she replied "Michael Jordan", being a huge fan of him. This led to another barrage of mockery. Because of the mounting derision against her for her response, she later ended up suffering from depression and panic attacks.

Awards and achievements
Preceded by Clarissa Marchese	Miss Italia; 2015	Succeeded by Rachele Risaliti
