= Montalto di Castro =

- Comune
- Comune di Montalto di Castro
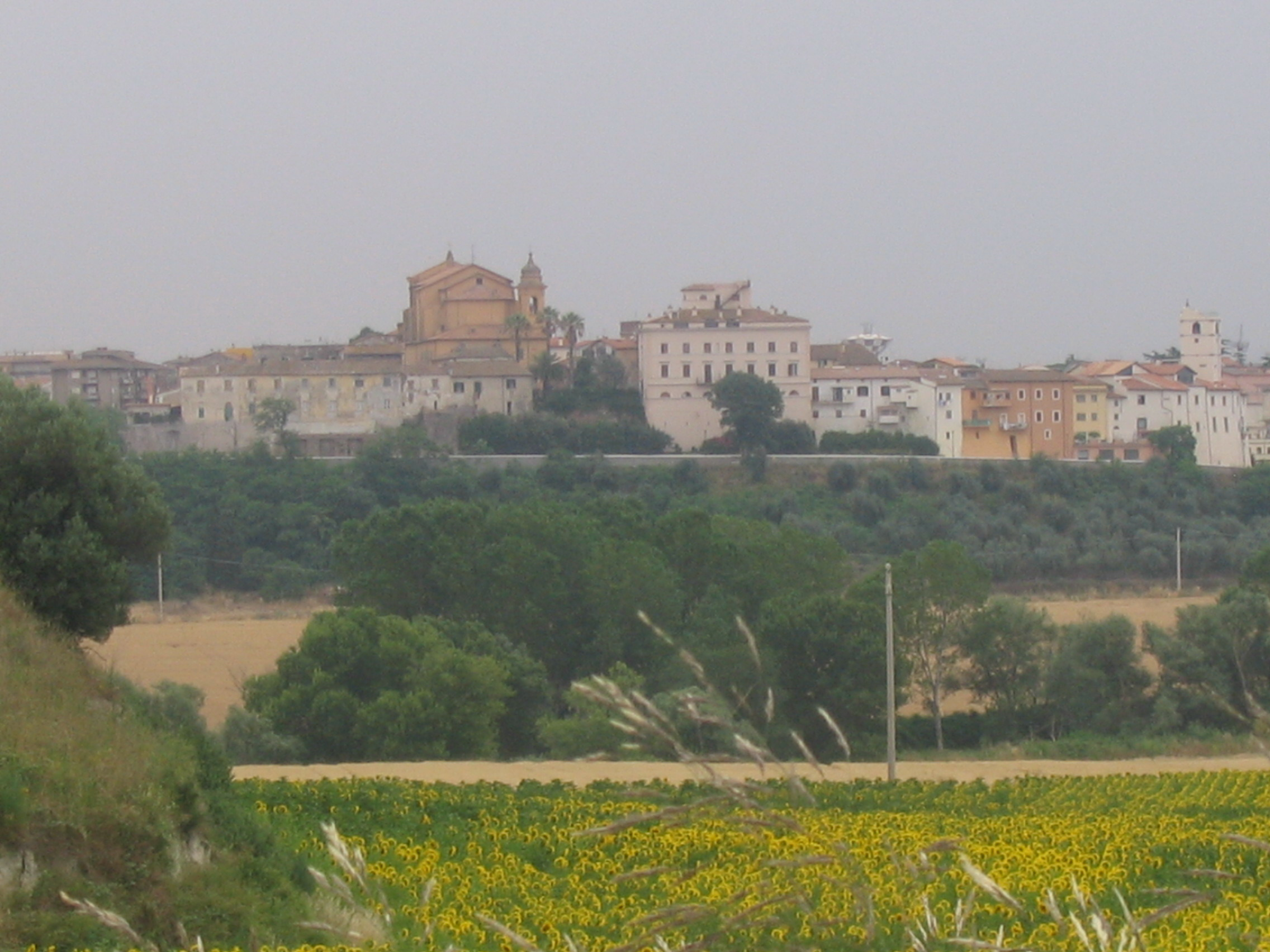

- Coat of arms

- Location within Italy Location within Lazio
- Coordinates: 42°21′N 11°36′E
- Country: Italy
- Region: Lazio
- Province: Viterbo (VT)
- Frazioni: Pescia Romana

Government
  - Mayor: Sergio Caci (Forza Italia)

Area
  - Total: 189.4 km^{2} (73.1 sq mi)
- Elevation: 42 m (138 ft)

Population (30 April 2009)
  - Total: 8,812
  - Density: 46.53/km^{2} (120.5/sq mi)
- Demonym: Montaltesi
- Time zone: UTC+1 (CET)
  - Summer (DST): UTC+2 (CEST)
- Postal code: 01014
- Dialing code: 0766
- Website: Official website

Montalto di Castro is a comune (municipality) in the province of Viterbo, in the Italian region of Lazio, located about 90 kilometres (56 miles) northwest of Rome and about 40 kilometres (25 miles) west of Viterbo.

It is home to a large fossil fuel powered power plant managed by Enel and the largest solar PV power plant in Italy.

== Transportation ==
Montalto di Castro is linked by road to the European route E80 motorway. The Italian state railway Ferrovie dello Stato Italiane provides a rail link that allows passengers to travel to Rome, Pisa, Orbetello, or Civitavecchia.

== People ==
- Lea Padovani, Italian actress
- Alice Sabatini, Italian model and basketball player, Miss Italia 2015

== See also ==
- Montalto di Castro Nuclear Power Station
