= Marisa Jossa =

Italian television actress (1938–2023)

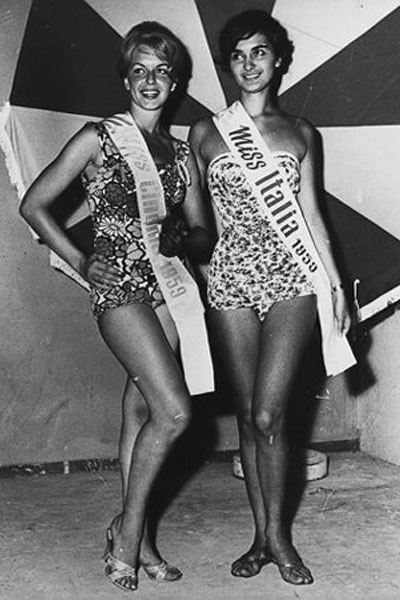
- Jossa (right) with Ileana Capurso, elected Miss Cinema in 1959
- Born: 15 September 1938
- Died: 19 November 2023 (aged 85)
- Beauty pageant titleholder
- Title: Miss Italia 1959

Marisa Jossa (15 September 1938 – 19 November 2023) was an Italian television actress. In 1959 she won the title of Miss Italia, winning the crown on 30 August 1959.

== Life and career ==
Marisa Jossa was born on 15 September 1938. Her daughter Roberta Capua was also awarded the Miss Italia title in 1986.

Jossa died on 19 November 2023, at the age of 85.
