= Spirito DiVino =

Studio album by Zucchero
- Released: 27 May 1995
- Recorded: October 1994 – March 1995
- Studio: A&M, Hollywood; Boiler Room, New Orleans; Umbi, Modena
- Genre: Soft rock, pop rock, blues rock
- Length: 44:34
- Label: Polydor
- Producer: Corrado Rustici

Zucchero chronology
Miserere (1992)	Spirito DiVino (1995)	The Best of Zucchero Sugar Fornaciari's Greatest Hits (1996)

Spirito DiVino is the seventh studio album by the Italian blues rock singer-songwriter Zucchero Fornaciari, released on 27 May 1995 by Polydor Records. The album was also released in partial Spanish language edition, and English edition titled Spirito DiVino: Stray Cat in a Mad Dog City.

== Overview ==
It is his first album in three years, after the "darker" Miserere, and when started to see things more positive after the divorce which affected him. The album's title is wordplay of "Spirito Divino" (Divine Spirit) and "Spirito di Vino" (Wine Spirit).

As it is the case with his studio albums, it includes notable guest collaborations. The New Orleans Gospel Choir, Clarence Clemons, David Sancious, Jeff Beck (on "Papà perche"), Sheila E. (on "Alleluja", lyrics written by Italian rapper Jovanotti and Mark Addison), and Francesco De Gregori who wrote the lyrics of "Pane e sale".

== Release ==
The album topped the charts in Italy four weeks in 1995, and one week in 1996 at its 39th week on chart. With sales of 700,000 copies in 1995, and 400,000 in 1996, with 1.1 million copies in almost two years it was certified 11× Platinum in Italy. It also entered the Top 5 in France and Switzerland, being certified Platinum in both countries, selling over 2.5 million copies worldwide until December 1996.

Those songs in Spanish in the Spanish edition were translated by Fito Páez and Carlos Toro, while in English edition by Pat MacDonald, Angelo Palladino, Tena Clark, Mark Addison, Alberto Salerno, and Frank Musker.

Zucchero toured to promote this album in 1995–1996 with Spirito DiVino World Tour, with over 150 concerts in Europe and North America, an estimated audience of 1.4 million people.

== Reception ==
Professional ratings
Review scores
Source	Rating
Allmusic	3/5 stars

The album has generally met with positive reviews. Stephen Thomas Erlewine from AllMusic gave the (Italian edition) album 3/5 stars, concluding it is immaculately produced, but "most of the songs aren't particularly distinctive, lacking immediate melodies or memorable hooks", however "they were selected as showcases for Zucchero's charisma and they do a very good job of demonstrating the singer's charm and sex appeal".

== Track listing ==
Italian edition

All tracks are written by Zucchero Fornaciari, except where noted.

No.	Title	Lyrics	Music	Length
1.	"Voodoo Voodoo"		Zucchero, Luciano Luisi	4:07
2.	"Datemi Una Pompa"			4:05
3.	"O.L.S.M.M." (Organizzazione Laica X La Salvaguardia E La Manutenzione Dei Matrimoni)			3:28
4.	"Pane E Sale"	Francesco De Gregori		5:12
5.	"X Colpa Di Chi?"			3:58
6.	"Il Volo"			5:30
7.	"Senza Rimorso"	Zucchero, Alberto Salerno		4:35
8.	"Papà Perché"	Zucchero, Alberto Salerno		4:00
9.	"Così Celeste"			4:55
10.	"Alleluja"	Jovanotti, Mark Addison		4:44

== Personnel ==
- Zucchero - vocals, acoustic guitar, electric guitar, hammond organ, piano, mellotron, percussions,
- Luciano Luisi - keyboards
- Polo Jones - bass
- David Sancious - keyboards, hammond organ
- Corrado Rustici - acoustic guitar, electric guitar, keyboards
- Steve Smith - drums
- Stewart Copeland - drums (in Papà perché)
- Johnnie Johnson - piano, hammond organ, bass
- Rosario Jermano - percussion
- Pat MacDonald - guitar
- Sheila E. - chorus, percussion
- Clarence Clemmons - saxophone, wind instruments
- Jeff Beck - electric guitar (in Papà perché)
- Leo Nocentelli - electric guitar, chorus (in Senza rimorso)
- Memphis Horns - wind instruments
- Lisa Hunt - chorus, background vocals
- Mino Vergnaghi, Arthur Miles, Emanuela Cortesi, Antonella Pepe, New Orleans Gospel Choir, Coro della O.L.S.M.M. - chorus

== Certifications ==
Region	Certification	Certified units/sales
Belgium (BRMA)	Gold	25,000^{*}
France (SNEP)	Platinum	300,000^{*}
Italy	—	1,100,000
Italy (FIMI) Sales since 2009	Gold	25,000^{‡}
Switzerland (IFPI Switzerland)	Platinum	50,000^{^}
Summaries
Europe (IFPI)	Platinum	1,000,000^{*}
^{*} Sales figures based on certification alone.^{^} Shipments figures based on certification alone.^{‡} Sales+streaming figures based on certification alone.
