= Luna Voce =

Dutch-Italian model and beauty queen

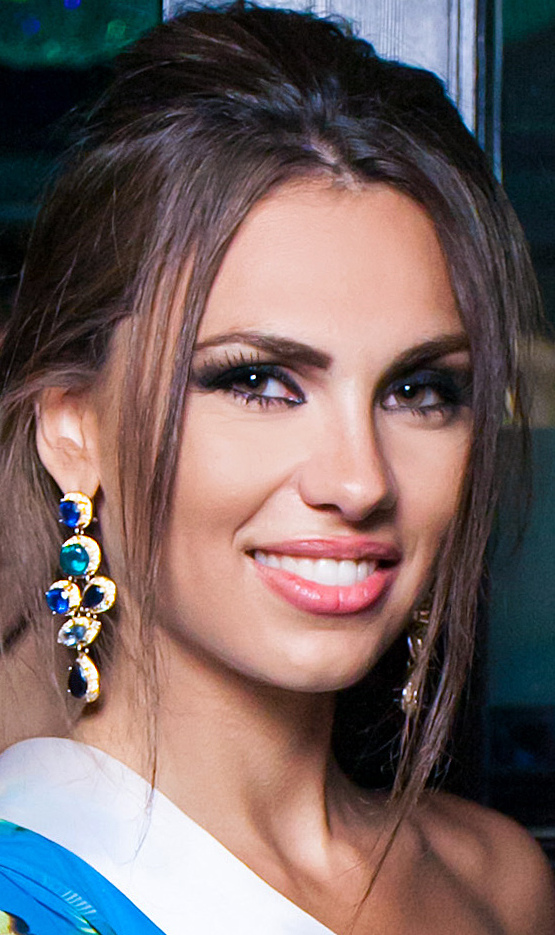
- Voce in 2013
- Born: Luna Isabelle Voce; 4 April 1988 (age 38); Amsterdam, Netherlands
- Height: 5 ft 9 in (1.75 m)
- Beauty pageant titleholder
- Title: Top Model of the World 2012; Miss Universe Italy 2013
- Hair color: Dark brown
- Eye color: Green
- Major competitions: • Miss International 2008 (Unplaced) • Miss Earth 2009 (Unplaced) • Top Model of the World 2012 (Winner) • Miss Universe Italy 2013 (Winner) • Miss Universe 2013 (Unplaced)

Luna Isabella Voce (born 4 April 1988) is a Dutch-Italian model and beauty pageant titleholder who was crowned Miss Universo Italia 2013 and represented her country at Miss Universe 2013 but unplaced.

== Early life and career ==
Luna was born in Amsterdam on April 20, 1988. Her father is Italian. She grew up in Crotone and is now based in Milan as a professional fashion model for Major Model Management, Why Not Model Agency and Elite Model Management. Luna speaks five languages, and is a student of Natural Sciences. She also enjoys being a stylist.

== Miss Universe Italy 2013 ==
Luna was crowned Miss Universe Italy 2013 on 20 July 2013 at the Rainbow MagicLand theme park in Rome. By winning the title, Luna earned the right to represent her country at the Miss Universe 2013 pageant in Moscow, Russia, to be held on November 9, 2013. As part of her prize package, she won a week-long stay in Milan to attend the prestigious John Casablancas modeling academy, where she received intensive training in all areas of competition to aid her preparation for the Miss Universe pageant.

== Miss Universe 2013 ==
Voce represented Italy at Miss Universe 2013 held in Moscow, Russia on 9 November 2013 where she vied to succeed outgoing titleholder Olivia Culpo but failed to place in the semifinals.

== Other Pageants ==
Luna is an experienced pageant competitor, having represented Italy at the Miss International 2008 and Miss Earth 2009 pageants. In addition to that, she won the Top Model of the World pageant in 2012. She was also a finalist at the Miss Italia pageant in 2008. She had previously competed in the Miss Universe Italy pageant in 2009, finishing as the 3rd runner-up. The following year, she was the 1st runner-up at the 2010 Miss World Italy pageant. Because she has dual Dutch and Italian citizenship, Luna also entered the 2011 Miss Nederland pageant, placing among the Top 6 finalists.

Awards and achievements
Preceded by Grazia Maria Pinto	Miss Universo Italia; 2013	Succeeded by Valentina Bonariva
