= Sophia Sergio =

Italian beauty pageant titleholder

- Born: 16 February 1992 (age 34); Naples, Italy
- Education: Parthenope University of Naples
- Height: 1.83 m (6 ft 0 in)
- Beauty pageant titleholder
- Title: Miss Universo Italia 2016
- Hair color: Brown
- Eye color: Brown
- Major competitions: Miss Italia 2011 (Unplaced); Miss Universo Italia 2016 (Winner); Miss Universe 2016 (Unplaced)

Sophia Sergio (born 16 February 1992) is an Italian beauty pageant titleholder who was crowned Miss Universo Italia 2016 and represented Italy in Miss Universe 2016 in Manila, Philippines.

== Early life ==
Sergio is a graduate of the three-year degree course in International Business Management and of the specialist degree in Marketing and International Management at the Parthenope University of Naples. She has two younger brothers and as a teenager she discovered a passion for basketball and judo, while the approach to the world of fashion took place at the age of 15 when she accidentally accompanied a friend to a fashion show.

== Miss Italia 2011 ==
Sergio began her pageantry career representing Miss Cinema Veribel Campania in the Miss Italia 2011 competition on 19 September 2011, but did not place.

== Miss Universo Italia 2016 ==
Sergio was crowned Miss Universo Italia 2016 held on 18 December 2016 at the Parco dei Principi Grand Hotel in Rome by her predecessor Giada Pezzaioli.

== Miss Universe 2016 ==
She participated as the official representative of her country to the 2016 Miss Universe pageant held in Manila, Philippines on 30 January 2017, but did not place.

Awards and achievements
Preceded by Giada Pezzaioli	Miss Universo Italia; 2016	Succeeded by Maria Polverino
