= James Leo Ryan (actor) =

American actor

James Leo Ryan, also known as Jimmy or Jim, is an American stage, film, and television actor born in 1975 He is one of three children and an alumnus of Loy Norrix High School and Denison University.

== Professional career ==
=== Film work ===
Ryan has appeared as Marlon in the short film The Ropes, as Yosef in the film Species III and as a dancer in the 2000 film Psycho Beach Party. In 2006, he appeared as a paralyzed man in the Hallmark Channel movie Though None Go with Me, in the short film Haunted Prison and in the TV movie Death Row as Vincent.

In 2013, Ryan appeared as Patrick in the film No Ordinary Hero: The SuperDeafy Movie, which opened on August 24, 2013. In April 2014, he filmed A Light Beneath Their Feet with Taryn Manning, released in 2015.

=== Television work ===
Since 1999, Ryan has appeared in various television series, starting with Action and in The Pretender as Mackey in the episode "Extreme". In 2000, he played a guitarist in the City Guys episode "Havoc" and appeared in the Two Guys and a Girl episode "Disco Nights". In 2001, he played Spiro in the Three Sisters episode "Masters of Intervention", a villain in The District episode "Don't Fence Me In", an air conditioning repairman in the Six Feet Under episode "Familia" and in The Beast episode "Functional Family".

In 2002, he was seen in The Job episode "Quitter", as Raim in the Charmed episode "Long Live the Queen" and as a ticket scalper in the Do Over episode "Rock 'n' Roll Parking Lot". He appeared in 2003 as Morris in the CSI: Crime Scene Investigation episode "Feeling the Heat" and in the 10-8: Officers on Duty episode "Lucy in the Sky". In 2004, he was in She Spies as Bleached Guy in "Spies Gone Wild", in ER as Welling in "Forgive and Forget" and in The Shield as Soren Arnovic in the episode "Posse Up".

In 2005, he appeared in Numb3rs as Cummings in "Counterfeit Reality". In 2006, he appeared in Love, Inc. as Eddie in the episode "Cursed". In 2008, he appeared in the Hannah Montana episode "We're All on This Date Together" and, in 2009, he appeared as Levar Cole in the Medium episode "The Future's So Bright".

In May 2014, Ryan guest starred as Marino in "The Song of Ant", an episode of the MOCAtv web series, "Ambiance Man", with Fred Armisen.

=== Regional work ===
Ryan has appeared in numerous regional productions across the US, including The Full Monty (musical) as Ethan at Musical Theatre West, Camelot as Mordred at Walnut Street Theatre, Footloose as Willard, You're a Good Man, Charlie Brown as Snoopy at the Sacramento Music Circus and Sisterella as Grubman at the Pasadena Playhouse.

He appeared in the Caldwell Theatre productions of My Three Angels as Alfred, A Few Good Men as Downey and The Little Foxes as Leo. He was also in the La Mirada Theatre productions of The Foreigner as Ellard and The Last Mass at Saint Casimir's as Georgie.

He was in a musical adaptation of the 1985 film Mask at the Pasadena Playhouse and in The Last Night of Ballyhoo as Peachy Weil at the La Mirada Theatre.

=== Stage work ===
Ryan made his Broadway debut as Pete in Show Boat with Cloris Leachman and Ned Beatty. He has also been on Broadway as Reuben in Joseph and the Amazing Technicolor Dreamcoat with Sam Harris, Claquesous in Les Misérables with Colm Wilkinson, and Rooster Hannigan in Annie with Nell Carter.

He has also participated in pre-Broadway workshops of Sweet Smell of Success, Finding Nemo, Snow White, Finian's Rainbow and Chocolat. On 10 October 1998, Ryan appeared in a concert version of Jubilee at Carnegie Hall in New York City for the benefit of the Gay Men's Health Crisis, which was directed by Herbert Ross and featured many Broadway stars including Lynne Taylor-Corbett and Alice Ripley. He was also in the casts of Broadway Bares VII, VIII, XI, XIV.

In 2010, Ryan appeared as Jigger in the Reprise Theatre Company's production of Carousel at UCLA's Freud Playhouse. He reprised the role in a 2012 concert version at Kodak Hall at Eastman Theatre.

Ryan starred as Smee in the national touring production of Peter Pan, featuring Cathy Rigby, which ended on April 28, 2013.
