= Susanna Huckstep =

Italian model and showgirl

- Born: Susanna Huckstep; 10 June 1969 (age 56); Trieste, Italy
- Years active: 1984–present
- Known for: Miss Italia
- Spouse: Pietro Savarese
- Children: Augusto Savarese

Susanna Huckstep (born 10 June 1969 in Trieste) is an Italian beauty pageant titleholder who the winner of the 45th edition of Miss Italia. She won the crown on 2 September 1984. She represented Italy at Miss Universe 1986 but Unplaced.

In 1992 she was testimonial of Pierre Cardin and agree the campaign against anorexia nervosa, and testimonial Gardaland in 2003.

She married the Neapolitan manager Pietro Savarese, and they have a son, Augusto.

Awards and achievements
Preceded by Raffaella Baracchi	Miss Italia; 1984	Succeeded by Eleonora Resta
