= Erica De Matteis =

Italian beauty pageant titleholder (born 1994)

- Born: 20 April 1994 (age 32); Rome, Lazio, Italy
- Height: 1.84 m (6 ft 0 in)
- Beauty pageant titleholder
- Title: Miss Universo Italia 2018
- Hair color: Blonde
- Eye color: Blue
- Major competitions: • Miss World Italy 2015 (2nd Runner-up) • Miss Universo Italia 2018 (Winner) • Miss Universe 2018 (unplaced)

Erica De Matteis (born 20 April 1994 in Rome, Lazio) is an Italian model and beauty pageant titleholder who was crowned Miss Universo Italia 2018. She represented Italy at the Miss Universe 2018 pageant in Bangkok, Thailand.

== Life and career ==
De Matteis was born and raised in Rome, Lazio. She graduated in the Faculty of Sciences of Education and loves working with children. She is a singer and musician, from the age of 14 she started working as a model for clothing brands. She married her fiancé in 2023.

== Pageantry ==
=== Miss World Italy 2015 ===
De Matteis finished as the 2nd Runner-up at Miss World Italy 2015, where she represented Lazio. Greta Galassi from Trentino-Alto Adige was crowned as the 2015 winner and competed at Miss World 2015 in Sanya, China where she failed to place.

=== Miss Universo Italia 2018 ===
De Matteis was crowned as Miss Universo Italia 2018, where she represented Lazio. She was crowned by Miss Universo Italia 2017 Maria Polverino.

=== Miss Universe 2018 ===
She represented Italy at the 2018 Miss Universe pageant, which was held in Bangkok, Thailand on 17 December 2018, where she failed to place among the 20 semifinalists.

Awards and achievements
Preceded by Maria Polverino	Miss Universo Italia; 2018	Succeeded by Sofia Trimarco
