= Lea T =

Brazilian stylist and model

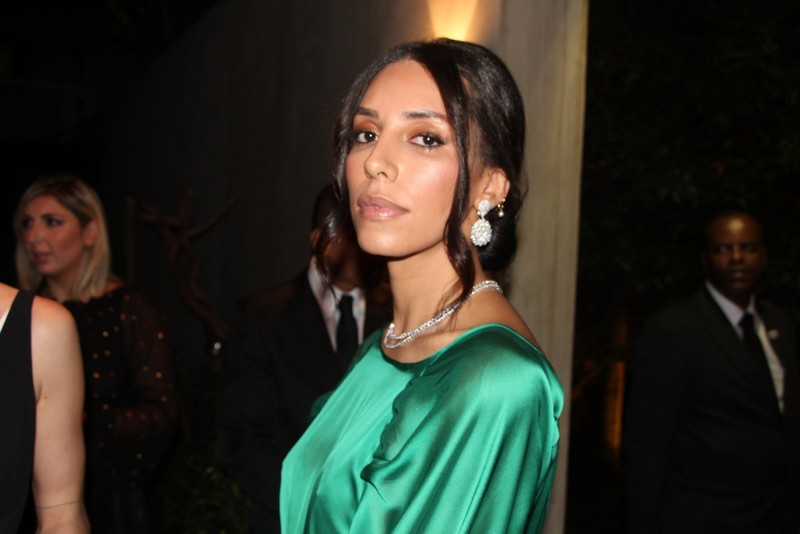
- Lea T in 2015
- Born: Leandra Medeiros Cerezo; 19 February 1981 (age 45); Belo Horizonte, Brazil
- Modeling information
- Height: 1.81 m (5 ft 11 in)
- Hair color: Brown
- Eye color: Brown
- Agency: Women Management (New York, Paris); Elite Model Management (Milan); Uno Models (Barcelona)

Leandra Medeiros Cerezo, known professionally as Lea T (born 19 February 1981), is a Brazilian-born, Italian-raised transgender fashion model. She has been called the "muse" of Riccardo Tisci, chief creative officer of British luxury brand Burberry; her professional last name of "T" stands for Tisci.

She is the face of American hair-care brand Redken.

She is also a pop culture icon of transgender advocacy in the LGBT community. She has stated that discrimination against LGBT people is an ongoing issue, and that society has more to do before it is resolved.

== Early life ==
Assigned male at birth, T is the daughter of well-known former Brazilian football player Toninho Cerezo and was raised in Italy.

== Career ==
Lea T was first discovered by model agent Piero Piazzi, who signed her aged 17, before her transition. Givenchy senior designer Riccardo Tisci then discovered her, asking her to assist him, before making her the face of Givenchy in late 2010. Her first runway show was for Alexandre Herchcovitch during São Paulo Fashion Week in January 2011. T has featured in campaigns for Givenchy, Benetton and Philipp Plein, shot by Terry Richardson.

She has been featured in editorials in Vogue Paris, Numero, Interview and Love. In 2011, she was also the cover star of two editions of the Spring/Summer 2011 edition of Love, one as a solo model and another featuring her kissing Kate Moss. T has also graced the covers of international editions of Elle, Marie Claire, Grazia and Glamour.

In 2013, she participated in the Italian version of Dancing with the Stars on Rai Uno entitled Ballando con le Stelle.

In February 2015, Lea T was chosen by Forbes magazine one of the 12 women who changed Italian fashion, alongside names like Miuccia Prada, Anna Dello Russo and Franca Sozzani. In 2014 she became the face of American hair-care brand Redken, thus making her the first openly transgender model to front a global cosmetics brand.

Lea T became the first openly transgender person ever to participate in the opening ceremonies of an Olympics when she led the Brazilian team into the stadium on her bike during the 2016 Rio Olympics, leading out a 465-strong team contesting 29 sports, modern pentathlete Yane Marques carrying the Auriverde flag into the stadium.

== Personal life ==
In a January 2011 interview, T stated her intention to undergo sex reassignment surgery. The surgery occurred in March 2012, in Thailand. In an interview to Fantástico, in January 2013, she described the surgery in a negative way but two weeks later she said that she "[felt] satisfied with the results".

T has stated that she considers herself to be bisexual.

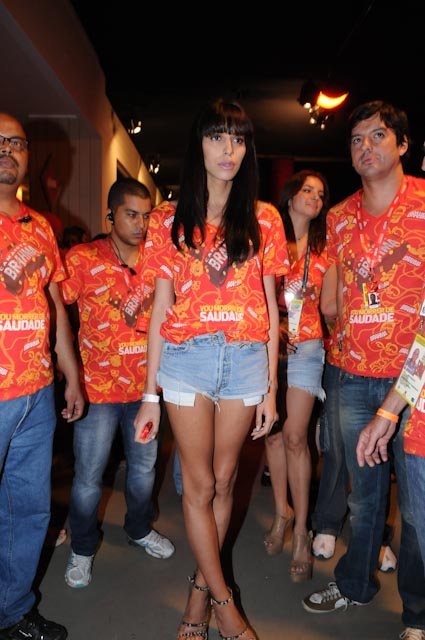
Lea T in 2011

== Award ==
She was on the list of the BBC's 100 Women announced on 23 November 2020.
