= Maria Perrusi =

Italian beauty queen and model (born 1991)

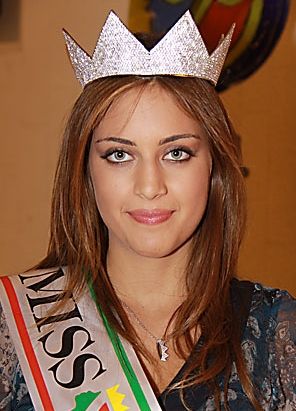
- Perrusi in September 2009
- Born: 13 September 1991 (age 35); Cosenza, Italy
- Beauty pageant titleholder
- Title: Miss Italia 2009
- Major competition: Miss Italia

Maria Perrusi (born in Cosenza on 13 September 1991) is an Italian beauty queen and model. She won Miss Italia 2009.

== Biography ==
Perrusi grew up in Fiumefreddo Bruzio, a small town in the province of Cosenza. She graduated in with a degree in accounting in Paola, Calabria. In 2009, she won the Miss Italy beauty contest, after reaching the final with the title of Miss Calabria.

After her victory, she made her debut in the fashion world, first modeling for the Gattinoni fashion house and then in 2010 for Renato Balestra.

She has been the spokesperson for advertising campaigns for Cotonella, Miluna, Peugeot, Sash, Deborah, Wella, Diana T, Agos, and Valleverde. In 2011, she starred in a commercial for Sardanelli tuna. In 2012, she was cast in La moglie del sarto (The Tailor's Wife), directed by Massimo Scaglione. In January 2013, she was featured in a calendar created by the Calabrian Chamber of Fashion and dedicated to fashion designer Gianni Versace.
