= Carmen Panepinto Zayati =

Italian model and researcher (born 1999)

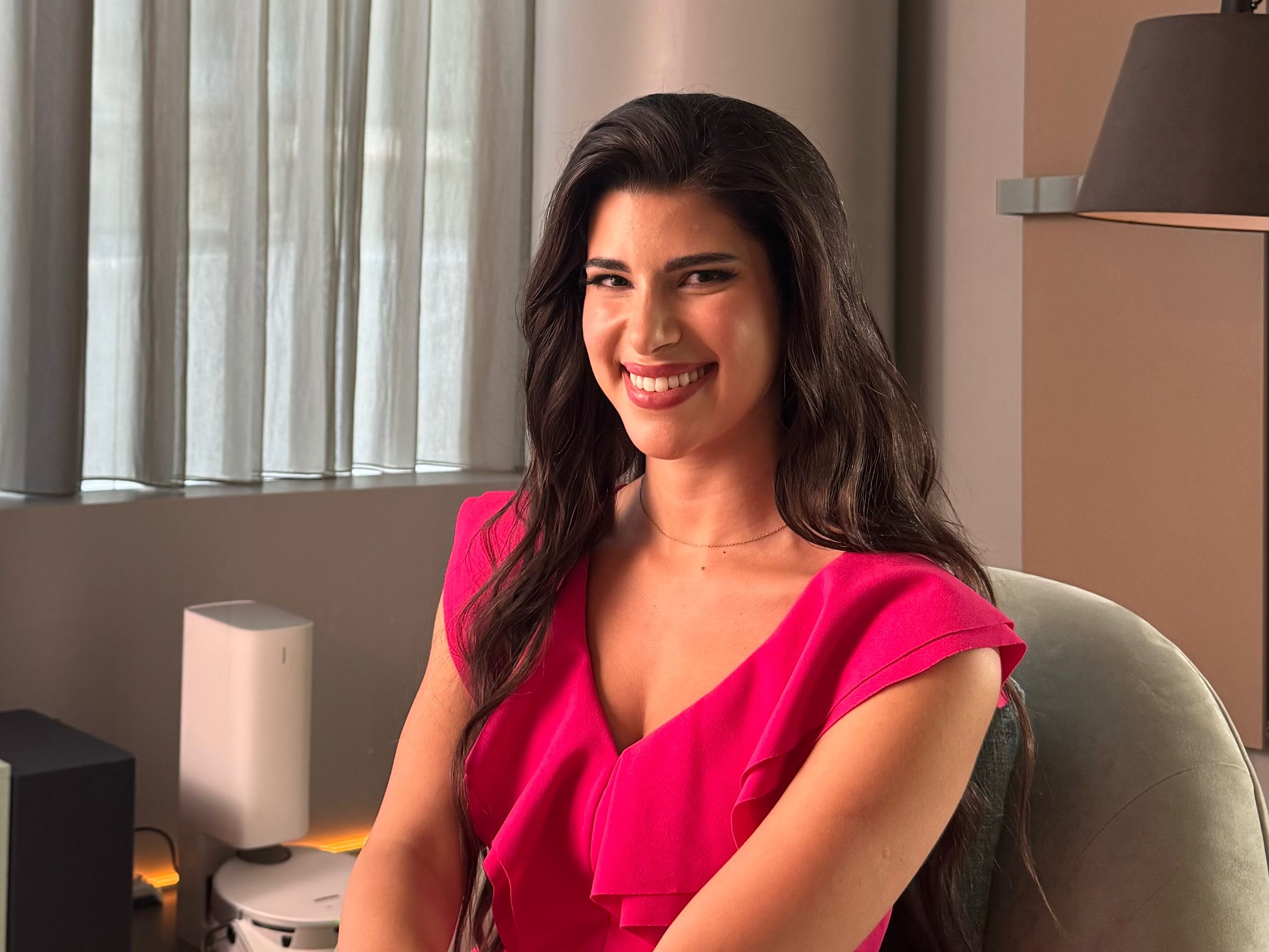
- Panepinto Zayati in 2024
- Born: 14 November 1999 (age 26); Vittoria, Sicily, Italy
- Education: University of Pisa (BSc); Sant'Anna School of Advanced Studies (MSc)
- Occupation: Researcher
- Height: 1.75 m (5 ft 9 in)
- Beauty pageant titleholder
- Title: Miss Universo Italia
- Major competitions: Miss Universo Italia 2023 (Winner); Miss Universe 2023 (Unplaced)

Carmen Panepinto Zayati (born 14 November 1999) is an Italian model, beauty pageant titleholder, and researcher. She was crowned Miss Universo Italia 2023 and represented her country at Miss Universe 2023. She is a Fulbright scholar.

== Biography ==
Panepinto Zayati was born on 14 November 1999 in Vittoria, a city and comune in the province of Ragusa, Sicily. She holds a bachelor's degree in Electronic engineering from the University of Pisa and a master's degree in Bionic engineering (cum laude) from the Sant'Anna School of Advanced Studies. As of 2026, Panepinto Zayati is a Biorobotics PhD student at the Biorobotics Institute of the Sant'Anna School of Advanced Studies. In 2026, she won a Fulbright scholarship to conduct research at Harvard University. On 2 July of that year, Panepinto Zayati, along with other recipients of the scholarship, was received by Italian president Sergio Mattarella during an official meeting.

== Miss Universo Italia 2023 ==
Panepinto Zayati, representing Marche, was crowned Miss Universo Italia 2023 in a pageant held in Canosa di Puglia in October 2023.

Panepinto Zayati went on to represent Italy at Miss Universe 2023, held in El Salvador in November 2023. She finished outside of the top 20 and was therefore excluded from the final parts of the pageant.

== Activism ==
Panepinto Zayati's activism has been focused on encouraging women and girls to pursue an education and career in STEM. After her crowning as Miss Universo Italia 2023, she stated: "my mission focuses on empowering women in STEM [...]. I understand that one of the main challenges women face in this field is the lack of female role models."

She was an ambassador for the so-called "STEM law", that established the Italian national week of Science, Technology, Engineering, and Mathematics.

Awards and achievements
Preceded by Virginia Stablum	Miss Universo Italia; 2023	Succeeded by Glelany Cavalcante
