= Sisterella =

Musical

- Music: Larry Hart
- Lyrics: Larry Hart
- Book: Larry Hart
- Basis: Cinderella by Charles Perrault
- Awards: NAACP Theatre Awards for Best Musical; NAACP Theatre Awards for Best Director; NAACP Theatre Awards for Best Musical Staging and Choreography

Sisterella is a musical, presented and produced by Michael Jackson with Miramax Films in association with Tribeca. Music, lyrics and book are by Larry Hart. The original choreographer was Ramon Del Barrio.

The musical has been described as a "spoofy Cinderella-based African-American musical." It was originally planned for a Broadway run in the fall of 1997. The show sold out its March to April 1996 original run at the Pasadena Playhouse in Pasadena, California. It toured the United States, Europe and Australia. Hart created the book and the music with the reader workshops at the New York's Musical Theatre Works, which did the workshops on Disney's Beauty and the Beast.

== Plot summary ==
The show is an original musical based on the tale of Cinderella.

== Cast ==
- Yvette Cason as Dahlia in the original production, Tina Cross in the 1998 run
- Jimmie Wilson as Prince Jean-Luc in the original production, Donny Rae Evins in the 1998 run
- Wanda Houston as Magnolia
- Rain Pryor as Chrysanthemum, Billie Stapleton in the 1998 run
- Gregory McKinnon as King
- Della Miles as Ella
- Jim Ryan as Lord Monty Grubman in the original run, Red Symons in the 1998 run
- Richard O'Brien as Dr. Cranium
- Jody Keith Barrie as Dr. Goniff
- Larry Hart as Indursky
