= Alice Rachele Arlanch =

Miss Italia 2017

- Born: Alice Rachele Arlanch; 20 October 1995 (age 30); Rovereto, Italy
- Height: 1.78 m (5 ft 10 in)
- Title: Miss Italia 2017

Alice Rachele Arlanch (20 October 1995) is the beauty pageant titleholder of Miss Italia 2017. She won the crown on 10 September 2017.

== Biography ==
Born in Rovereto, she studies law at the University of Trento.
