= Wanda Houston =

American singer and actress

- Born: Wanda Lynn Houston; Chicago, Illinois, U.S.
- Origin: Berkshire County, Massachusetts
- Genres: Blues; soul; R&B; gospel; jazz; rock and roll; electronic music
- Instrument: Vocals
- Years active: late 1990s–present

Wanda Houston is an American singer and actress.

== Biography ==
Houston is originally from Chicago, Illinois. She started singing in gospel choirs of West Side, Chicago. She was born to John and Bessie, the oldest of four. Houston comes from a creative family. Her father was an actor, and her mother was both an actress and a singer. Her father ran a theatre company. Houston studied chemistry in college, but eventually switched to music, getting her degree in music with a focus on opera. After college she ended up in Los Angeles, spending two decades there. At this time, Houston starred in some Hollywood films, and went on to sing at the Sands in Las Vegas. After Los Angeles she moved to Australia while touring with Sisterella. She spent a year in Australia, and considered staying there forever.

In the 2000s, Houston toured with Martha and the Vandellas and The Platters. She lived and performed throughout the United States, Australia and Europe. In 2001 she settled in the Berkshires, and now she performs chiefly in New England. In the Berkshires she is considered a diva. Her current group plays "a mix of mid-20th century jazz and rhythm-and-blues".

In February 2021 she sang the sorrow songs of W. E. B. Du Bois at the 2021 Du Bois Legacy Festival, commemorating the civil rights activist's 153rd birthday. Her own parents were deeply involved in the civil rights movement. She performed at the BarnArts Masquerade Jazz and Funk Winter Music Carnival on more than one occasion.

Houston collaborated with American progressive rock band Spock's Beard on two occasions. She was a featured artist on the dance single "Unity" by John Rizzo, also featuring Lisa Hunt. The song peaked at number 27 on the United States Billboard Dance Club Songs.

=== Acting career ===
While in Los Angeles, she starred in a few Hollywood films, including The Christmas Path, also starring Shia LaBeouf. Houston starred in an off-Broadway play called "A Good Swift Kick", which premiered in July 1999. The play wasn't warmly received. However, The New York Times praised Houston's performance, calling it fantastic. In 2005 she debuted at Broadway, in a A Streetcar Named Desire, alongside John C. Reilly and Natasha Richardson. Show director Edward Hall expanded Houston's role ("The Negro Woman") in this version. Houston toured the world with Sisterella, a show produced by Michael Jackson where she played one of the wicked stepsisters. In 2006 she performed Ain't Misbehavin' at the Sharon Playhouse.

== Personal life ==
Houston stated that her favorite jazz song is "Nature Boy", her favorite R&B song is "Midnight Train to Georgia", and her favorite song to perform live is her group's version of "On and On". Mahalia Jackson was her idol growing up.

== Discography ==
=== As featured artist ===
List of singles as featured artist and year released
Title	Year	Peak chart positions	Certification	Album
Title	Year	US	Certification	Album
"Unity" (John Rizzo featuring Lisa Hunt and Wanda Houston)	2008	27		Non-album single
