= Carolina Stramare =

Italian beauty pageant contestant

- Presenters: Alessandro Greco
- Venue: Jesolo
- Broadcaster: TV: Rai 1, Rai 1 HD; Radio: Rai Radio 2 Web: RaiPlay, RaiPlay Radio
- Winner: Carolina Stramare; Lombardy

Carolina Stramare (born 27 January 1999, in Genoa) is a beauty pageant titleholder of the Miss Italia 2019. She won the crown on 6 September 2019 and dedicated the victory to her mother.
