= Yvette Cason =

American actress

Yvette Cason is an American television, theatre, and film actress, and a former Miss Black America from Washington, D.C.

== Career ==
Cason was an understudy for the character of Effie White in the original 1981 Broadway musical Dreamgirls, 1985 international tour, and 1987 Broadway revival. In 2006, she played May, the mother of Deena Jones, portrayed by Beyoncé Knowles in the feature film version of Dreamgirls. She also appeared in an episode of the sitcom The King of Queens as Mrs. Blanchard in the episode "Road Rayge". Her early musical training (while growing up in Washington, DC) was at The Sewell Music Conservatory.

Cason played Dahlia, the wicked stepmother, in the original 1996 run of Sisterella. It was said that the character was played "with exquisite relish" by Cason.

== Filmography ==
=== Film ===
Year	Title	Role	Notes
2006	Dreamgirls	May	
2012	Middle of Nowhere	Mrs. Hastings	Uncredited
2018	A Wrinkle in Time	Mrs. Teacher	

=== Television ===
Year	Title	Role	Notes
1989	Almost There!	LaKeishaa #1	Episode: "Friends"
1993	Knots Landing	Bailiff	Episode: "The Invisible Man"
1998	The King of Queens	Mrs. Blanchard	Episode: "Road Rayge"
2000	Great Performances	Miss Mary	Episode: "Play On!"
2001	The District	Principal Joanne Drake	Episode: "Melt Down"
2003	Boston Public	Anita Graham	Episode: "Chapter Seventy-One"
2003	American Dreams	Elma	Episode: "Life's Illusions"
2004	The Parkers	Mavis	2 episodes
2004	Judging Amy	No-Time-for-This Mom	Episode: "Accountability"
2005	Alias	Connie	Episode: "Mirage"
2005	ER	Oncology Nurse	2 episodes
2007	Hannah Montana	Teacher	Episode: "Me and Rico Down by the School Yard"
2008	Notes from the Underbelly	Ultrasound tech	Episode: "If the Shoe Fits"
2009	The Bold and the Beautiful	Evelyn Haynes	Episode #1.5474
2016	The Rick and Stanley Show	Rhonda	Episode: "Benefactors"
2018	Shameless	Mrs. Jackson	Episode: "Do Right, Vote White!"
2019	For the People	Anna Jenkins	Episode: "Moral Suasion"
2020	NCIS	Maureen	Episode: "In the Wind"
2020	The Gaze: No Homo	Sherry Grosse	7 episodes
2021	Why Women Kill	Yvonne	Episode: "The Unguarded Moment"
2021	Twenties	Estelle	Episode: "Special Delivery"
2021	Curb Your Enthusiasm	Councilwoman Yovanovitch	2 episodes
2022	Bust Down	Eunice	Episode: "Won't He Do It"
2022	Bosch: Legacy	Judge Alberta Ryan	2 episodes
2022	Raven's Home	Grace	Episode: "The Great Chill Grill Giveaway"
2022	Bunk'd	Rose	Episode: "Where the Buffalo Betties Roam"
2023	Pretty Freekin Scary	Maw-Maw	Episode: "Life's Rich Gumbo"
