= Franca Dall'Olio =

Italian politician

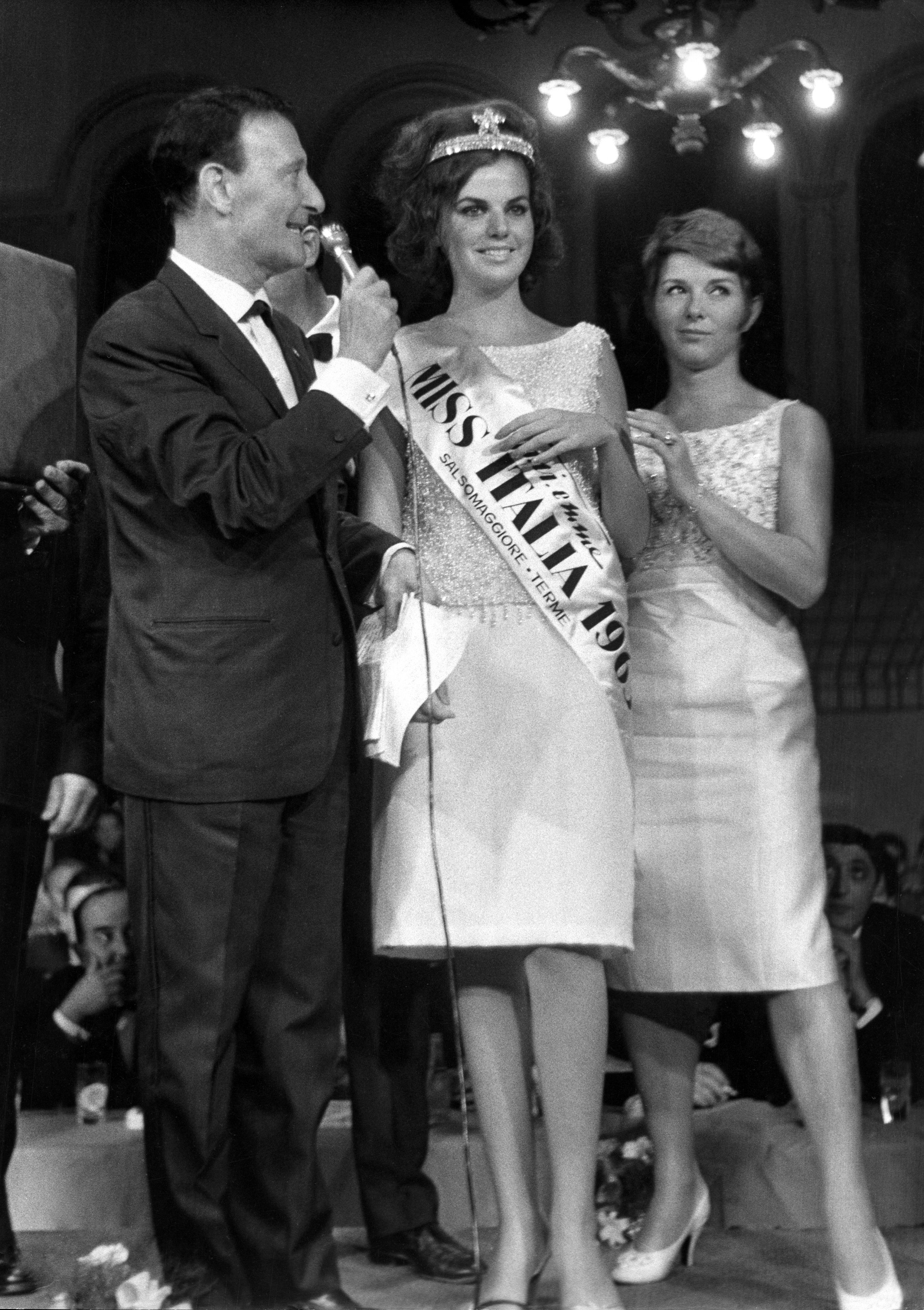
- Dall'Olio upon her Miss Italia victory in 1963, between hosts Nunzio Filogamo and Delia Scala
- Born: 5 April 1945 (age 81); Cagliari, Sardinia, Italy
- Height: 1.73 m (5 ft 8 in)
- Beauty pageant titleholder
- Title: Miss Italia 1963
- Hair color: Black
- Eye color: Grey
- Major competition: Miss Italia

Franca Dall'Olio, also Dallolio (born 5 April 1945), is an Italian former beauty queen, model and politician. She is noted for winning Miss Italia in 1963.

Many years after retiring from modeling, in the 1990s she became a city counsellor in her hometown Cagliari for two terms and served as chairman of the City Council Committee for Culture. When in 1994 fellow Sardinian Alessandra Meloni won Miss Italia, too, Dall'Olio warmly congratulated her father in the City Council, making a notable bipartisan celebration for she was sitting in the far right party National Alliance and he was sitting in the left-wing Democratic Party.
