= Snack Bar Budapest =

- Italian theatrical release poster
- Directed by: Tinto Brass
- Screenplay by: Tinto Brass
- Based on: Snack Bar Budapest by Silvia Bre and Marco Lodoli
- Starring: Giancarlo Giannini; François Negret; Raffaella Baracchi; Philippe Léotard; Carlo Monni
- Cinematography: Alessio Gelsini Torresi
- Edited by: Tinto Brass
- Music by: Zucchero
- Release date: 22 September 1988
- Country: Italy
- Language: Italian

Snack Bar Budapest is a 1988 Italian neo-noir comedy film written and directed by Tinto Brass and starring Giancarlo Giannini. It is based on the novel with the same title by Marco Lodoli and Silvia Bre.

== Plot ==
A disbarred lawyer (Giancarlo Giannini) is working as a debt collector for his partner Sapo (Philippe Léotard). Prostitute Milena (Raffaella Baracchi) impregnated by Sapo at an unnamed sea resort with a grotesque atmosphere (filmed in Lido di Ostia), he encounters the ambitious young ringleader Molecola (François Negret) who has bought several old recreational sites in the environs to turn the town into an "Italian Las Vegas", but the hotel-bar named "Snack Bar Budapest" run by a man (Carlo Monni) and his family remains an obstacle. Molecola needs a lawyer to legitimise the forceful eviction of Snack Bar Budapest and the lawyer agrees. However, a murder he commits brings him at odds with Molecola.

== Cast ==
- Giancarlo Giannini: the lawyer
- François Negret: Molecola
- Raffaella Baracchi: Milena
- Philippe Léotard: Sapo
- Carlo Monni: the hotel keeper
- Sylvie Orcier: Carla
- Giorgio Tirabassi: Papera
- Valentine Demy: the prostitute
- Tinto Brass: the magistrate (cameo)
