= Roberta Capua =

Italian television host, actress, model and beauty pageant titleholder

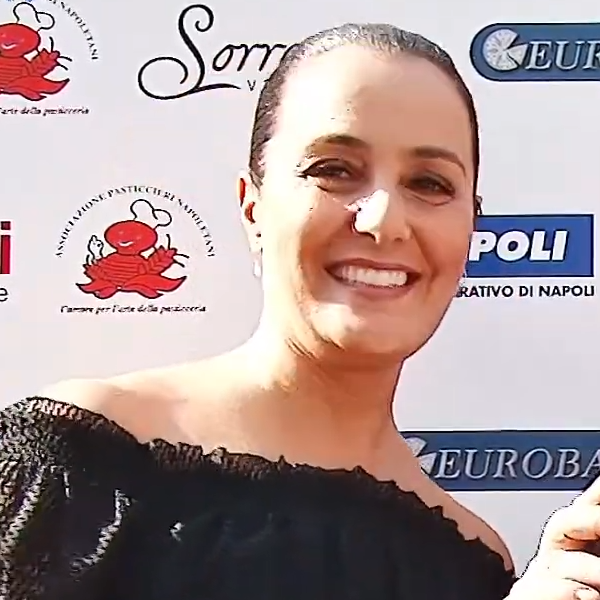
- Born: Roberta Capua; 5 December 1968 (age 57); Naples, Italy
- Occupations: Television host, actress, ex model
- Height: 1.80 m (5 ft 11 in)
- Spouse: Stefano Cassoli (m. 2011)
- Children: 1
- Beauty pageant titleholder
- Title: Miss Italia 1986
- Years active: 1986 - present
- Hair color: Light Brown
- Eye color: Brown
- Major competitions: • Miss Italia 1986 (Winner) • Miss Universe 1987 (1st Runner-up)

Roberta Capua (born 5 December 1968 in Naples) is an Italian television host, actress, model and beauty pageant titleholder who was crowned Miss Italia 1986 and placed 1st Runner-up at Miss Universe 1987 in Singapore.

== Biography ==
She became known in the Italian entertainment world with her election as Miss Italia in 1986. Her mother Marisa Jossa had been awarded the same title in 1959. The year after she placed first runner-up at Miss Universe.

In 1986, she had her first television role in the music contest Vota la voce, hosted by Claudio Cecchetto. She came back on TV in 1992 to lead the Retequattro's program I bellissimi di Retequattro; three years later she replaced for some week Paola Barale as soubrette of the Italian version of Wheel of Fortune, named La ruota della fortuna.

From 1996 to 1998, she presented with Luciano Rispoli the Telemontecarlo's daily program Tappeto volante and, from 1995 to 1997, hosted Aspettando Beautiful, a short show on air before the famous soap opera The Bold and the Beautiful, and Nonsolomoda.

In 1998, hosted with Giancarlo Magalli the primetime show Fantastica italiana, on Rai 1, and in the summer of the same year presented Cercasi Miss Italia disperatamente.

From 1998 to 2002, together with Tiberio Timperi, hosted the weekend-morning shows Mattina in famiglia and Mezzogiorno in famiglia, while from 2001 was in the cast of the daily morning show I fatti vostri, aired by Rai 2. From 2002 to 2004 she led other two morning shows, Unomattina, with Luca Giurato and then with Marzo Franzelli and Caterina Balivo, and S.O.S. - Unomattina, aired by Rai 1.

In September 2004 switch to Mediaset replacing Laura Freddi in the Sunday Canale 5's show Buona domenica, with Maurizio Costanzo, where she remained for two seasons, until 2006. Between January and April 2006 hosted the Saturday afternoon show Tutti pazzi per i reality, a talk show about the most important events of the reality shows aired by Canale 5, Grande fratello and La fattoria. In the summer of 2005 also hosted the Saturday primetime show Sei un mito.

In 2007, hosted some events: Speciale buon compleanno Radio Italia, Speciale Natale in Vaticano, Dancing on Ice and the pilot La seconda volta.

In 2008, she had her first son, Leonardo, from the consort Stefano Cassoli, she also had a relationship with the swimmer Massimiliano Rosolino.

In 2017, she won the first edition of Celebrity Masterchef Italy.

== Television ==
- Vota la voce (Canale 5, 1986)
- I bellissimi di Retequattro (Retequattro, 1992–1993)
- Annunciatrice di Rete 4 (Rete 4, 1993 - 1994)
- La ruota della fortuna (Canale 5, 1995)
- Nonsolomoda (Canale 5, 1995–1996)
- EuroPeo show (Italia 1, 1996)
- Tappeto volante (Telemontecarlo, 1996–1998)
- Fantastica italiana (Rai 1, 1998)
- Cercasi Miss Italia disperatamente o quasi (Rai 1, 1998)
- Mattina in famiglia (Rai 2, 1998–2002)
- Mezzogiorno in famiglia (Rai 2, 1998–2002)
- Sera in famiglia (Rai 2, 1999–2000)
- I fatti vostri (Rai 2, 2001)
- Unomattina (Rai 1, 2002–2004)
- S.O.S. - Unomattina (Rai 1, 2002–2003)
- Buona domenica (Canale 5, 2004–2006)
- Sei un mito (Canale 5, 2005)
- Tutti pazzi per i reality (Canale 5, 2006)
- Speciale buon compleanno Radio Italia (Canale 5, 2007)
- Speciale Natale in Vaticano (Canale 5, 2007)
- La seconda volta (Retequattro, 2007)
- Dancing on Ice (Canale 5, 2007)
- Così fan tutte (Italia 1, 2009, guest star)
- Celebrity MasterChef Italia (SkyUno, 2017, concorrente)
- Italiani a tavola (Food Network, 2017)
- L'ingrediente perfetto (La 7, 2019–2020)

Awards and achievements
Preceded by Susanna Huckstep	Miss Italia; 1986	Succeeded by Michela Rocco di Torrepadula
