= Elisa Torrini =

Italian model (born 1989)

- Born: Elisa Torrini; 10 April 1989 (age 37); Rome; Lazio, Italy
- Height: 5 ft 11 in (1.80 m)
- Beauty pageant titleholder
- Title: Miss Universo Italia 2011
- Hair color: Black
- Eye color: Green
- Major competitions: • Miss Universo Italia 2011 (winner) • Miss Universe 2011

Elisa Torrini (born Rome, 10 April 1989) is an Italian model and beauty pageant titleholder. She was crowned Miss Universe Italy 2011 on 30 June 2011 at the Piazzale del Soccorso in Forio d'Ischia. She is 1.80 m tall (5'11"), one of tallest Italian delegates ever in the history of the pageant. By winning the title, Elisa earned the right to represent her country at the Miss Universe 2011 pageant in São Paulo, Brazil, on 12 September 2011.

As part of her prize package, Elisa won a week-long stay in Caracas, Venezuela during the month of August to attend the prestigious Katty Pulido International Academy, where she will receive intensive training in all areas of competition to aid her preparation for the Miss Universe pageant. It is the first time an Italian representative is sent abroad to train for the international competition.
