= Francesca Testasecca =

Italian model

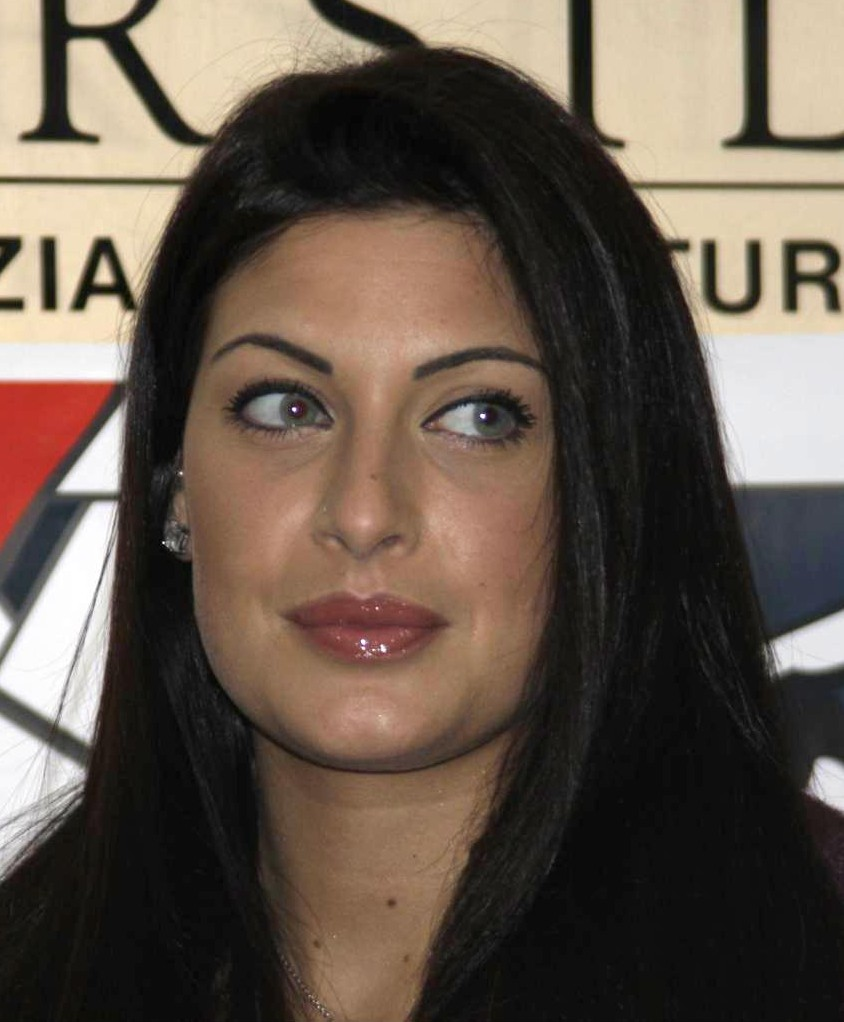
- Testasecca in 2011
- Born: Francesca Testasecca; 1 April 1991 (age 35); Foligno, Umbria, Italy
- Occupations: Model; television personality
- Years active: 2010–present

Francesca Testasecca (born 1 April 1991 in Foligno) is an Italian model, the winner of the 71st edition of Miss Italia. She won the crown on 13 September 2010.

== Biography ==
Graduated from istituto tecnico turistico, Francesca Testasecca is the second daughter of an autobus driver and a clerk.

Francesca is the second ever Miss Umbria to win the contest: the first one was Raffaella De Carolis in 1962.

On 25 December 2010 she co-hosted the new show 24mila voci alongside Milly Carlucci.In 2012, Francesca began filming her first film, Il Ragioniere della Mafia. The movie is set to come out in 2013.
