= Santa Caterina dello Ionio =

Santa Caterina Dello Ionio
- Comune
- Comune di Santa Caterina dello Ionio
- Location within Italy Location within Calabria
- Coordinates: 38°32′N 16°31′E
- Country: Italy
- Region: Calabria
- Province: Catanzaro (CZ)

Area
  - Total: 41 km^{2} (16 sq mi)
- Elevation: 459 m (1,506 ft)

Population (31 December 2013)
  - Total: 2,125
  - Density: 52/km^{2} (130/sq mi)
- Demonym: Caterisani
- Time zone: UTC+1 (CET)
  - Summer (DST): UTC+2 (CEST)
- Postal code: 88060
- Dialing code: 0967
- Patron saint: Santa Caterina d'Alessandria (in Paese), San Gabriele Arcangelo (only in Marina)
- Saint day: 25 November
- Website: Official website

Santa Caterina Dello lonio is a town and comune in the province of Catanzaro in the Calabria region of southern Italy.

== Geography ==
The village is bordered by Badolato and Guardavalle. Santa Caterina dello Ionio is divided into two locations; the Marina and the upper mountain village, located about 9 km from the coast. The village of about 2,100 inhabitants in 2013 is along the highway SS 106 Ionica and is located about 50 km from Catanzaro (Roccelletta), 150 km from Reggio Calabria, only 15 km from Riace (where the “Riace Bronzes” were discovered), 8 km from Monasterace (Caulonia) and about 60 km from Locri. It is the site of large marine areas, between coastal towns of the Ionian Sea. There are 3 to 15 km of completely deserted beach with widths from 50 to 150 metres from the shore. The coastline, full of coves, ranges from beaches of white granite sand to rocky coastal cliffs, which are accessible to everyone.

== History ==
Santa Caterina under the colonization of Magna Grecia, the Romans, and finally by the Greek-Byzantine. The Greeks founded along the coast from the 8th Century. Colonies flourished, but near the sea there was little suitable defense. The Greeks felt the need to unite in a safer and more suitable place for defense of all villages, abandoning the coast because of malaria and Saracen pirate invasions. It is believed that Santa Caterina dello Ionio arose following the Saracen invasions (650-1086 AD), by the union of the colonies in the territory. Originally, it was a small village surrounded by defensive walls, which opened four doors. Only one door "Porta dell'acqua", which translates to "Gateway of the water", remains. Around 1060, Santa Caterina dello Ionio became part of the county of Badolato. In 1272, the first lord of the village was Rinaldo Conclubet. In 1487, the noble family of Arena of Conclubet was involved with the conspiracy of the Barons. They were overthrown and the town was handed over to Conte Alberico from Barbiano. In the following years, various noble families ruled from Cordova to Galeotta, Gallelli of Badolato, from Gioieni to Colonna. In the seventeenth century, the noble family of Marzano endowed the village with a castle. In 1799, the possession of the territory passed to Di Francia, who held it until the abolition of feudalism.

== How to reach the town ==
From the Lamezia Terme International Airport or train station, traveling by car or a private transfer service, take highway A3 Salerno - Reggio Calabria, exit Lamezia Terme - Catanzaro. Continue along the S.S. 280 (E848) towards Catanzaro.
