= Raffaella Baracchi =

Italian actress

- Born: 25 March 1964 (age 62); Turin, Italy
- Occupations: Film actress; photomodel
- Years active: 1986–1990
- Spouses: Domiziano Arcangeli (1988–1992); Carmelo Bene (1992–2002; his death)
- Children: Salomè Bene (b. 1993)

Raffaella Baracchi (born 25 March 1964) is an Italian former actress and beauty pageant titleholder who won Miss Italia 1983.

== Miss Italia ==
Raffaella Baracchi, by the year 1983 and as Miss Piedmont, won the Miss Italia contest and represented Italy at the Miss Universe 1984.

== Film career ==
Baracchi made her cinema debut in 1986 with Maurizio Ponzi's poliziottesco-comedy Il tenente dei carabinieri. She appeared in Ruggero Deodato's The Barbarians in 1987 and in Deodato's 1988 giallo Phantom of Death as prostitute Laura. She also appeared in the same year in Tinto Brass's neo-noir Snack Bar Budapest where she played the prostitute Milena.

== Personal life ==
Baracchi married actor Domiziano Arcangeli in 1988; the same year, she met actor and director Carmelo Bene with whom she started a relationship. Her marriage to Arcangeli was annulled and in early 1992 she married Bene.

The couple had a daughter named Salomè (b. 1993) after the 1964 play by Bene.
