= Daniele Piombi =

Italian television presenter (1933–2017)

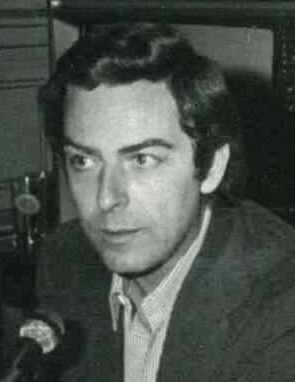
- Piombi in Rome in 1973
- Born: 14 July 1933; San Pietro in Casale, Italy
- Died: 18 May 2017 (aged 83); Milan, Italy
- Occupation: Presenter
- Height: 1.86 m (6 ft 1 in)

Daniele Piombi (14 July 1933 – 18 May 2017) was an Italian television and radio presenter and television writer.

== Life and career ==
Born in San Pietro in Casale, the son of a government employee and a teacher, Piombi graduated in political science at the University of Florence. After presenting several local live shows, he started his professional career in 1955, hosting the RAI show Viaggiare.

During his career Piombi hosted several musical events, including three editions of the Sanremo Music Festival, three editions of Cantagiro, one edition of Un disco per l'estate, seven editions of the Festival di Napoli, and three editions of the Castrocaro Music Festival.

He was the Italian commentator of the Eurovision Song Contest 1988.

Piombi is also well known for having been the creator, organizer and presenter of the "Premio Regia Televisiva", informally known as "Oscar TV", an award ceremony established in 1960 which rewards the best programs, directors and presenters of the Italian television.
