= Edelfa Chiara Masciotta =

Italian television personality and beauty pageant titleholder

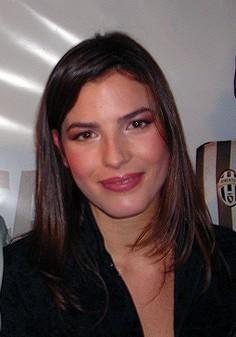
Edelfa Chiara Masciotta

Edelfa Chiara Masciotta (born 14 February 1984) is an Italian television personality and former beauty pageant titleholder who won Miss Italia 2005.

Masciotta was born in Turin. She was crowned Miss Italy on 19 September 2005. Among her duties during her reign was her participation in the opening and closing ceremonies of the 2006 Winter Olympic Games held at Turin, Italy.

In 2006, she was a contestant in the Italian edition of Dancing on Ice; the following year she hosted the show Paperissima sprint! on Canale 5. Since 2013 she has dated her partner Alessandro Rosina; she has three children with him.
