= Rachele Risaliti =

Italian model (born 1995)

- Born: Rachele Risaliti; 1 February 1995 (age 31); Prato, Italy
- Education: Polimoda
- Height: 1.77 m (5 ft 9 1/2 in)
- Title: Miss Italia 2016

Rachele Risaliti (born 2 February 1995) is a model and beauty pageant titleholder of the Miss Italia 2016. She won the crown on 10 September 2015.

== Biography ==
Born in Prato, Tuscany, she participated in August 2016 Miss Toscana, winning band. She is a professional dancer in Etruria Team, that won the European Championship of World Gymnaestrada in Helsingborg, Sweden, in 2014. She studied Fashion Project Management at Polimoda.
