= Miss Italia =

National beauty pageant competition in Italy

Miss Italia is a beauty pageant awarding prizes every year to young, female contestants from Italy. Since the first edition of the contest, in 1939, many of the contestants have gone on to careers in television and film.

== History ==
=== Early history and beginnings (1927-1935) ===
From 1927 to 1935, there were contests held in vein of the modern-day Miss Italia contest, with the winners often referred to as Miss Italy. This is mainly to choose Italy's representatives for both the International Pageant of Pulchritude (also known as "Miss Universe") and, later on, Miss Europe.

Year	Miss Italy	International Pageant
1927	Maria Gallo	1927 International Pageant of Pulchritude
1928	Livia Marracci	1928 International Pageant of Pulchritude
1929	Derna Giovannini	Miss Europe 1929
1930	Mafalda Morittino	Miss Europe 1930 and 1930 International Beauty Contest
1931	Claudia Bracetti	Miss Europe 1931
1932	Rosetta Montali	Miss Europe 1932 and 1932 International Pageant of Pulchritude
1933	Ivana Fusco	Miss Europe 1933
1934	Tosca Giusti	Miss Europe 1934 and 1935 International Pageant of Pulchritude
1935	Vanna Panzarasa	Miss Europe 1935

=== Miss Sorriso (1939-1941) ===
The main forerunner of Miss Italia was Miss Sorriso (Miss Smile), started in 1939 by Dino Villani and sponsored by a brand of toothpaste. Contestants were judged by their photographs rather than competing on a runway.

=== Founding of the modern day contest (1946-present) ===
After a break during World War II, the contest resumed in 1946 and adopted the present-day name of Miss Italia. It was held in Stresa, which had managed to maintain its hotel infrastructure despite the war. The venue then changed several times before it was established that Salsomaggiore Terme would be the permanent, annual host of the pageant.

Like contemporary Italian society itself, Miss Italia has gone through many changes over the years. In 1950, it was first broadcast on the radio. But since 1987, it has been broadcast live on television. As of 1990, the chest, waist, and hip measurements of the contestants are no longer judged, and in 1994, the contest was opened to married women and mothers (the 1987 winner had been disqualified when it was later discovered she was married). In 1996, Denny Méndez became the first Miss Italia woman of colour.

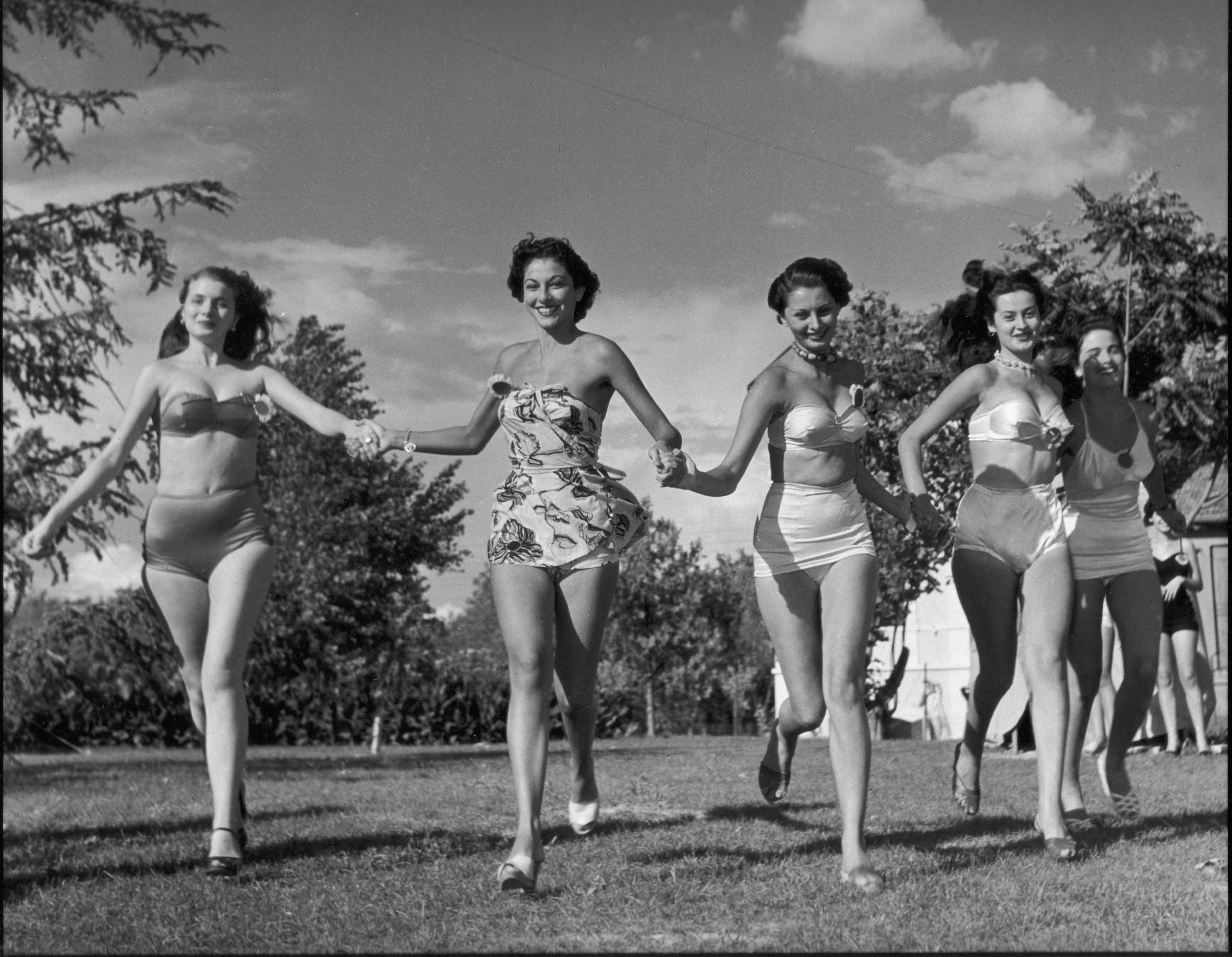

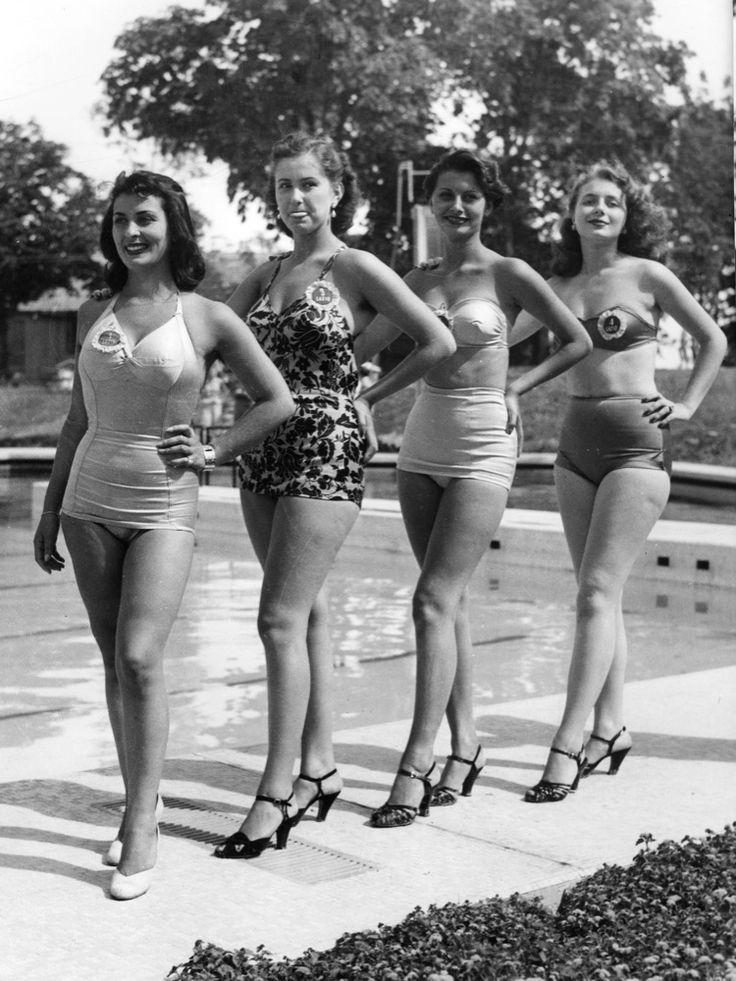

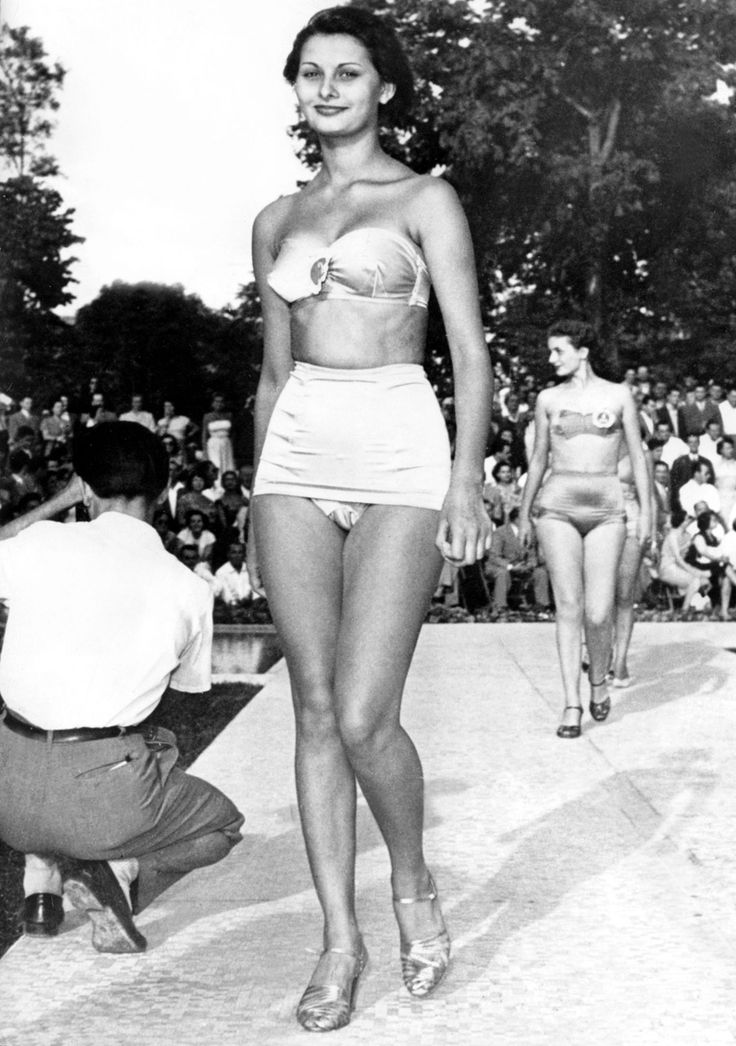

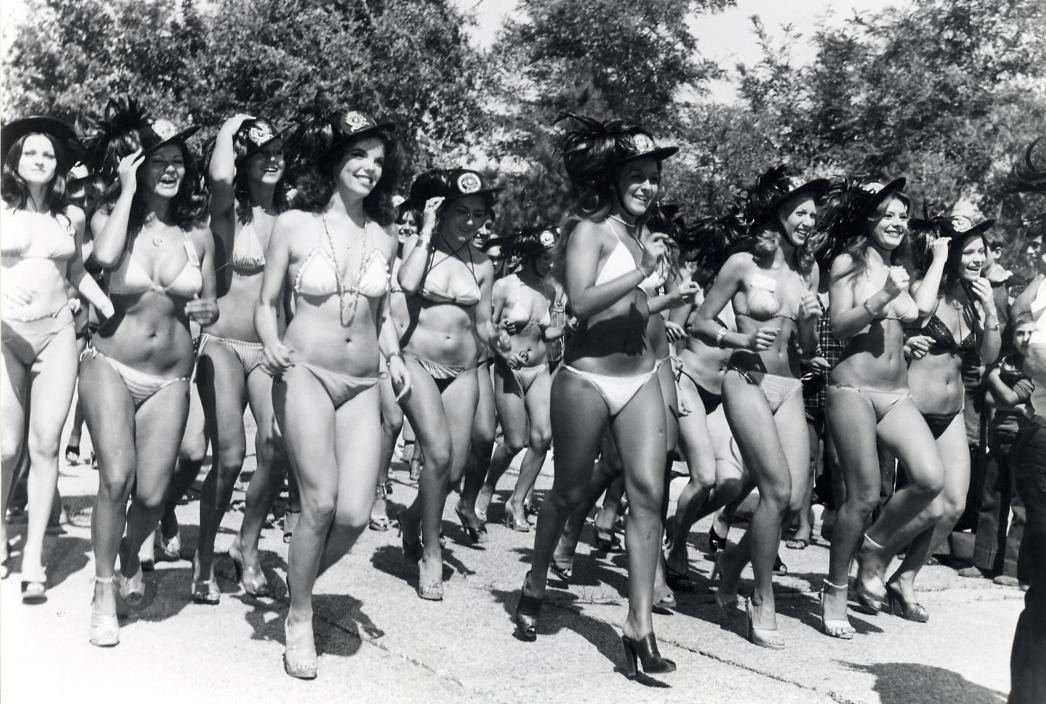

Among the participants finding later success in cinema and the entertainment industry at large (although many of them have not won the crown of Miss Italia itself) include: Caterina Balivo, Silvana Pampanini, Sophia Loren, Marcella Mariani, Lucia Bosè, Stefania Sandrelli, Mirca Viola, Simona Ventura, Patrizia Deitos, Anna Falchi and Martina Colombari.

From 1959 to 1988 the sole organizer of Miss Italia had been Enzo Mirigliani, to whose work the contest owes much of its current success. The jury groups that elect Miss Italia have included celebrities such as Totò, Giorgio de Chirico, Giovannino Guareschi, Luchino Visconti, Vittorio De Sica, Gina Lollobrigida, Alberto Lattuada, Marcello Mastroianni, Ugo Tognazzi, Lina Wertmüller, Dino Risi, Alberto Sordi, and Claudia Cardinale.

In 1989, Mirigliani and his daughter Patrizia Mirigliani started to organize the contest together until Enzo Mirigliani stepped down in May 2010 and died in 2011. After that Patrizia Mirigliani became the sole organizer of the contest.

Besides the title of "Miss Italia", during the pageant other consolation prizes are also awarded, including "Miss Elegance" and "Miss Cinema". In 1991 a separate pageant was instituted, called "Miss Italia nel Mondo", a competition for Italian women living abroad.

Miss Italia will no longer be held in Salsomaggiore Terme, for economic reasons. This was announced in April 2011, and a long list of cities have expressed interest in hosting the pageant. Cities include Sanremo, Rome, Fiuggi, Taormina, and many more. It was officially announced that Miss Italia 2011 will be held in Montecatini Terme. Milly Carlucci will not return as host of the pageant. Fabrizio Frizzi has replaced her for Miss Italia 2011. The pageant will only take place over two nights, rather than three. This year, the beauty pageant contest, back in a national broadcast television. The contest will be produced by Infront and RAI, The host will be Alessandro Greco. A program by Casimiro Lieto, Luca Parenti, and Alessandro Migliaccio. Directed by Francesco Ebner.

In 2021, for the first time in the history of the pageant, the final was held in Venice. The new format, created by Giorgio John Squarcia, removed sashes and numbers from the final, introduced three different types of "talent show"-style challenges, included contestants as unaware protagonists of social experiments filmed with hidden cameras, and, for the first time in history, allowed eliminated finalists to serve on the jury.

The final was originally scheduled for 19 December 2021, but due to two contestants testing positive for COVID-19, the decision to postpone the event to the following February was announced on 15 December. The winner of this edition was Neapolitan contestant Zeudi Di Palma.

In July 2023, in response to Miss Nederland being won by an openly transgender woman (Rikkie Kollé), Miss Italia instituted a blanket ban on trans women from competing. As a response, several trans men applied to enter the contest.

=== Miss Italia Crown Revolution ===
The 2021 final night was preceded by Miss Italia - Crown Revolution, a five-episode miniseries filmed in docu-reality style, created by Giorgio John Squarcia and hosted by Alessandro Di Sarno. Set in Venice, the series focused on introducing the finalists and showcasing some of the challenges they had to face, guided by judge-coaches.

=== Directorship and Organizer History ===
- Dino Villani (1939-1959)
- Enzo Mirigliani (1959-1988)
- Enzo Mirigliani and Patrizia Mirigliani (1989-2009)
- Patrizia Mirigliani (2010-present)

=== Regional rankings ===
Titles	Region	Winning years
12	Lazio	1950, 1951, 1952, 1953, 1967, 1971, 1972, 1993, 2000, 2015, 2020, 2022
11	Lombardy	1940, 1941, 1947, 1956, 1960, 1965, 1978, 1982, 1985, 1990, 2019
11	Sicily	1954, 1966, 1976, 1977, 1988, 1995, 2003, 2008, 2012, 2013, 2014
6	Tuscany	1946, 1973, 1980, 1996, 2016, 2024
6	Veneto	1957, 1964, 1989, 1992, 2002, 2007
5	Piedmont	1939, 1983, 2004, 2005, 2023
5	Calabria	1955, 1968, 1997, 2009, 2011
5	Friuli-Venezia Giulia	1948, 1970, 1974, 1984, 1987
4	Campania	1959, 1986, 2001, 2021
4	Marche	1949, 1969, 1981, 2018
3	Emilia-Romagna	1958, 1991, 1998
2	Trentino-Alto Adige	2006, 2017
2	Umbria	1962, 2010
2	Sardinia	1963, 1994
2	Liguria	1961, 1975
1	Basilicata	2025
1	Apulia	1999
1	Abruzzo	1979
0	Aosta Valley	
0	Molise	

== The winners of Miss Italia ==
Miss Sorriso
1939	Isabella Verney	1940	Gianna Maranesi	1941	Adriana Serra
1942	No pageant	1943	No pageant	1944	No pageant
1945	No pageant				
Miss Italia
1946	Rossana Martini	1947	Lucia Bosè	1948	Fulvia Franco
1949	Mariella Gianpieri	1950	Anna Maria Bugliari	1951	Isabella Valdettaro
1952	Eloisa Cianni	1953	Marcella Mariani	1954	Eugenia Bonino
1955	Brunella Tocci	1956	Nives Zegna	1957	Beatrice Faccioli
1958	Paola Falchi	1959	Marisa Jossa	1960	Layla Rigazzi
1961	Franca Cattaneo	1962	Raffaella De Carolis	1963	Franca Dallolio
1964	Giorgio Bonino	1965	Alba Rigazzi	1966	Daniela Giordano
1967	Cristina Businari	1968	Graziella Chiappalone	1969	Anna Zamboni
1970	Alba Balestra	1971	Maria Pinnone	1972	Adonella Modestini
1973	Margareta Veroni	1974	Loredana Piazza	1975	Livia Jannoni
1976	Paola Bresciano	1977	Anna Kanakis	1978	Loren Cristina May
1979	Cinzia De Ponti	1980	Cinzia Lenzi	1981	Patrizia Nanetti
1982	Federica Moro	1983	Raffaella Baracchi	1984	Susanna Huckstep
1985	Eleonora Resta	1986	Roberta Capua	1987	Michela Rocco di Torrepadula
1988	Nadia Bengala	1989	Eleonora Benfatto	1990	Rosangela Bessi
1991	Martina Colombari	1992	Gloria Zanin	1993	Arianna David
1994	Alessandra Meloni	1995	Anna Valle	1996	Denny Mendez
1997	Claudia Trieste	1998	Gloria Bellicchi	1999	Manila Nazzaro
2000	Tania Zamparo	2001	Daniela Ferolla	2002	Eleonora Pedron
2003	Francesca Chillemi	2004	Cristina Chiabotto	2005	Edelfa Chiara Masciotta
2006	Claudia Andreatti	2007	Silvia Battisti	2008	Miriam Leone
2009	Maria Perrusi	2010	Francesca Testasecca	2011	Stefania Bivone
2012	Giusy Buscemi	2013	Giulia Arena	2014	Clarissa Marchese
2015	Alice Sabatini	2016	Rachele Risaliti	2017	Alice Rachele Arlanch
2018	Carlotta Maggiorana	2019	Carolina Stramare	2020	Martina Sambucini
2021	Zeudi Di Palma	2022	Lavinia Abate	2023	Francesca Bergesio
2024	Ofelia Passaponti	2025	Katia Buchicchio	2026	Sarah Rizea

== Hosts ==
- Corrado Mantoni: 1946–56
- Nunzio Filogamo: 1952
- Enzo Mirigliani: 1959, 1961–78
- Renato Tagliani: 1960
- Mike Bongiorno: 1970, 1975, 2007
- Daniele Piombi: 1974
- Gabriella Farinon: 1974
- Pippo Baudo: 1976
- Alberto Lupo: 1977
- Vanna Brosio: 1979
- Andrea Giordana: 1980–1981, 1984, 1987
- Memo Remigi: 1982
- Ettore Andenna: 1983
- Michele Gammino: 1983
- Milly Carlucci: 1983, 2009, 2010
- Marco Columbro: 1986
- Fabrizio Frizzi: 1988–2002, 2011, 2012
- Carlo Conti: 2003–06, 2008
- Loretta Goggi: 2007
- Emanuele Filiberto of Savoy, Prince of Venice: 2010
- Massimo Ghini: 2013
- Cesare Bocci: 2013
- Francesca Chillemi: 2013
- Simona Ventura: 2014–2015
- Francesco Facchinetti: 2016–18
- Diletta Leotta: 2018
- Alessandro Greco: 2019-2020
- Alessandro Di Sarno: 2021
- Elettra Lamborghini: 2021
- Carolina Stramare: 2021
- Salvo Sottile: 2022
- Jo Squillo: 2023
- Andrea Dianetti: 2024

== See also ==
- Miss Universo Italia
- Miss Italia nel Mondo
- Miss World Italy
- Maggiorata

Maggiorata, //it.wikipedia.org/w/index.php?title=Maggiorata&oldid=152257754 (in data 30 agosto 2026).
