= International Pageant of Pulchritude =

International beauty pageant contest

Miss Universe
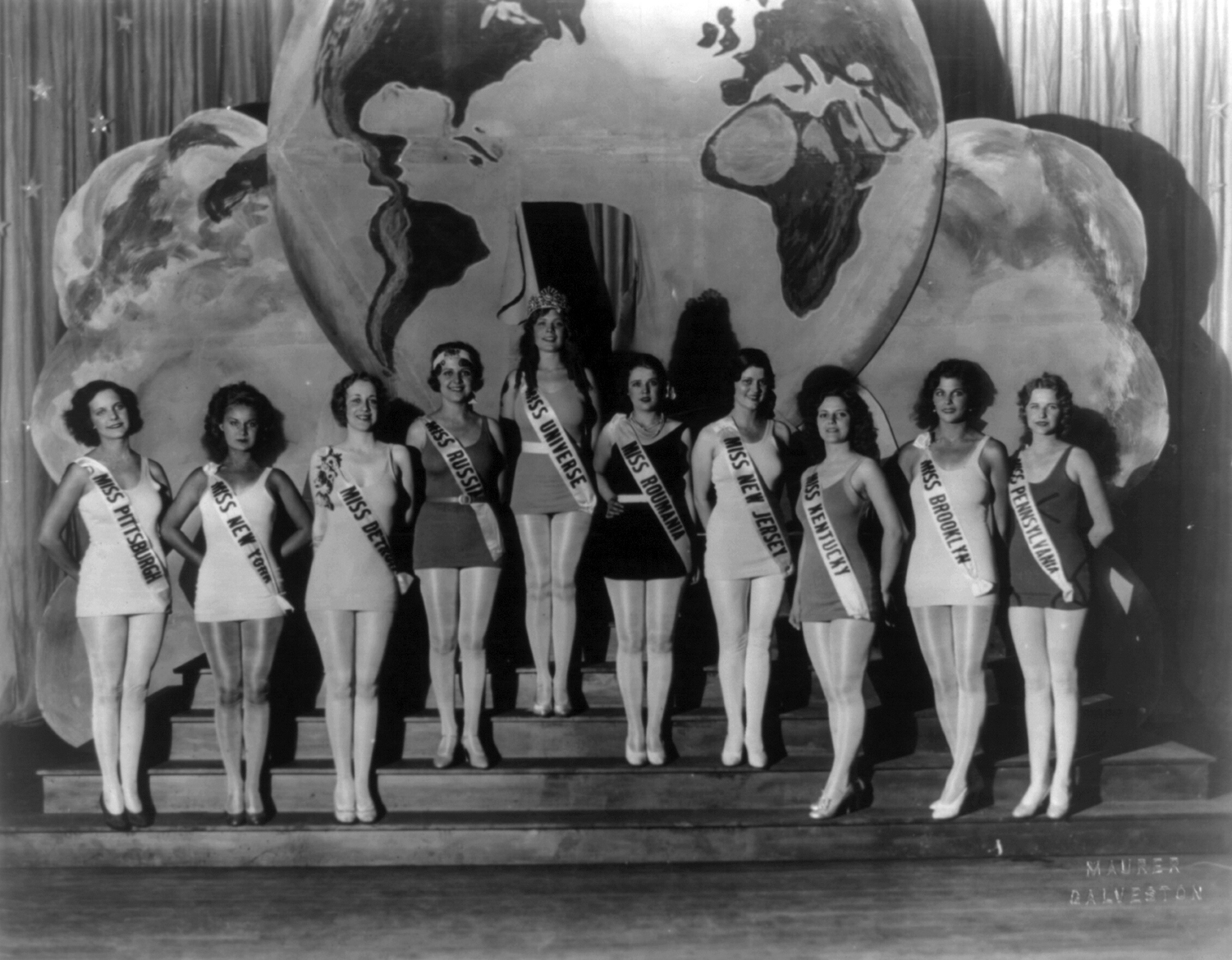
- The winners of the 1930 competition.
- Date: 1926–1935
- Location: Galveston, Texas, U.S.
- Also known as: Miss Universe

The International Pageant of Pulchritude, also known as Miss Universe or the International Beauty Contest, was a beauty contest that began in 1920, featuring contestants from multiple nations. This pageant originated the title "Miss Universe" and was the first international contest. The last pageant event in the United States was held in 1931 and additional Miss Universe events were held until 1935. The contest served as a model for modern contests that began after World War II.

The contest originated in Galveston, Texas, United States. The last Miss Universe event of this pre-World War II era was held in Brussels, Belgium. Though this contest served as a model and inspiration for the modern Miss Universe contests, the modern organization has no direct affiliation with these older contests.

== History ==
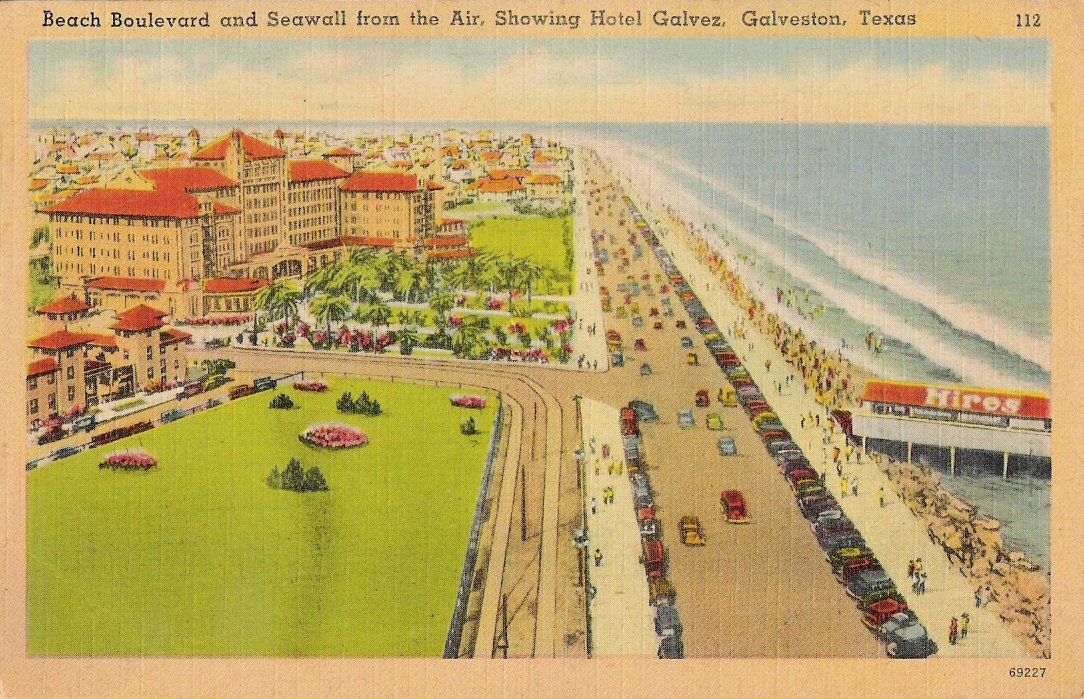
Postcard view of Galveston where the pageant originated

During the early 20th century, the island city of Galveston, still recovering from the devastating Hurricane of 1900, launched efforts to strengthen its tourism industry building new venues such as the famed Hotel Galvez and organizing regular waterfront events.

Beauty contests had existed around the U.S. since the 19th century as a means to build tourism for local communities. These events were generally local affairs featuring women from the communities themselves. In 1920 promoter C. E. Barfield organized a new event in Galveston known as "Splash Day". The event featured a "Bathing Girl Revue" competition as the centerpiece of its attractions. "Splash Day" was the kick-off of the summer tourist season in the city and was carried forward annually. At its height the event was one of the nation's largest beauty contests and would virtually triple the island's population during the weekend when it ran, attracting spectators from around the nation.

A trend toward national beauty contests developed in many nations such as Turkey, France, and Brazil, as well as the United States where both the Galveston event and the younger Miss America event in Atlantic City attracted contestants from around the nation. In 1926, taking advantage of this trend, the Galveston event became an international competition known as the International Pageant of Pulchritude. The winner of the contest was awarded the title of Miss Universe. In 1927 the contest became two separate events held over two days: one to award the title of "Miss United States" and one to award "Miss Universe". The Miss United States pageant drew contestants from as far away as New York and Utah. The "Miss Universe" pageant included contestants from a variety of countries including England, Russia, Turkey, Austria, Egypt, Thailand, Philippines, Hong Kong, Japan, Brazil and many others. Prizes were given to the top competitors. In 1929, for example, "Miss Universe" was given US$2000 in gold (US$38,000 in today's terms) and a silver plaque.

The event became an international sensation although, ironically, the national media in the United States gave the event far less attention than the press in some other countries. The media in Brazil was particularly enamored with the 1929 contest. Huge crowds were reported near the offices of Brazil's major newspapers awaiting word of the fate of Miss Brazil. She did not, however, even place in the contest. Angered, Brazil hosted its own "Miss Universe" contest in 1930 leading to two separate titleholders in that year. In the Brazilian event, "Miss United States" was unable to place in the competition.

The event in Galveston was discontinued in 1932 because of the Great Depression. "Miss Universe" events were instead held in Belgium in 1932 and 1935. After 1935 international competitions were discontinued until the modern Miss Universe contest was created in 1952 in California.

== Titleholders ==
The following were the titleholders for the annual pageants.

=== Miss United States ===
Year	Name	Home
1926	Catherine Moylan	Dallas
1927	Dorothy Britton	New York City
1928	Ella Van Hueson	Chicago
1929	Irene Ahlberg	New York City
1930	Dorothy Dell Goff	New Orleans
1931	Anne Lee Patterson	Northern Kentucky

=== Miss Universe ===
The pageant was not held during 1933 and 1934.

Edition	Year	Date	Miss Universe	Location	Entrants
1st	1926	May 17, 1926	Catherine Moylan; United States	Galveston, Texas, United States	37 USA & 2 foreign
2nd	1927	May 23, 1927	Dorothy Britton; United States	Galveston, Texas, United States	29 USA & 8 foreign
3rd	1928	June 4, 1928	Ella Van Hueson; United States	Galveston, Texas, United States	32 USA & 10 foreign
4th	1929	June 11, 1929	Lisl Goldarbeiter; Austria	Galveston, Texas, United States	34 USA & 10 foreign
5th	1930 (1)	August 5, 1930	Dorothy Dell Goff; United States	Galveston, Texas, United States	32 USA & 7 foreign
6th	1930 (2)	September 7, 1930	Yolanda Pereira; Brazil	Rio de Janeiro, Brazil	
6th	1931	June 16, 1931	Netta Duchâteau; Belgium	Galveston, Texas, United States	28 USA & 8 foreign
7th	1932	July 31, 1932	Keriman Halis Ece; Turkey	Spa, Belgium	
8th	1935	September 29, 1935	Charlotte Wassef; Egypt	Brussels, Belgium	

== Legacy ==
The Pageant of Pulchritude served as a model for modern pageants. Though beauty contests were common even in the 19th century, the Galveston event was the first international contest. It was also one of the first national contests in the United States.

A 2006 documentary entitled Miss Universe 1929 - Lisl Goldarbeiter: A Queen in Wien was released in Hungary detailing the life of the 1929 Miss Universe. That year is regarded by some as the first truly international event as it became the first year to garner substantial worldwide media attention and was the first year a non-American won the title. Additionally, Goldarbeiter's win is historically notable because she was a Jew in an era when antisemitism was popular in the U.S. and Europe.

The title of the pageant was parodied by science-fiction author Keith Laumer in his story "Retief and the Pangalactic Pageant of Pulchritude".

In 2009, a local Galveston organization known as "Islander By Choice" resurrected the pageant on a much smaller scale. The new contest, known as the Galveston Island Beach Revue, features local contestants in 1920s-era swimwear as well as contemporary swimwear. As of 2022, the contest has continued to be an annual event.

== Gallery ==
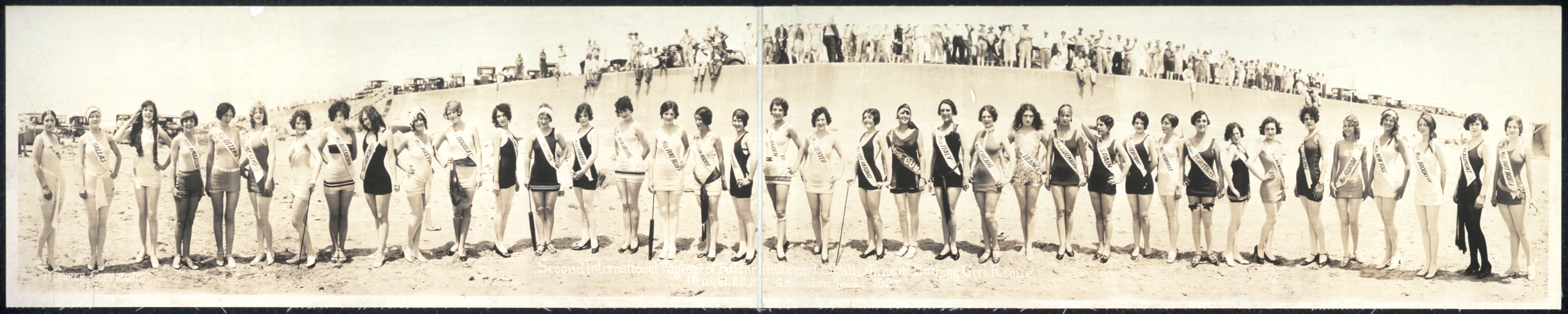
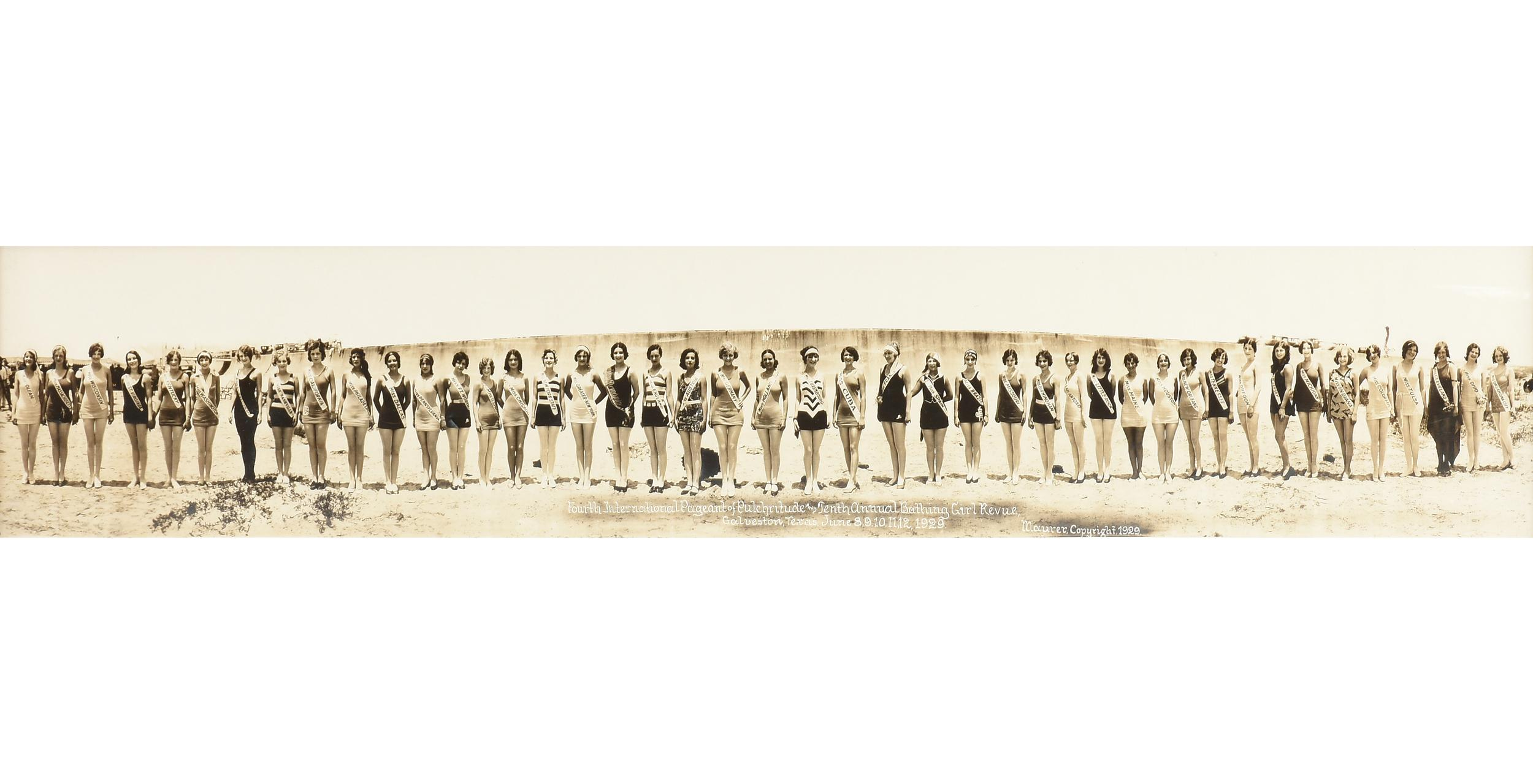

== See also ==
- List of beauty contests
