= Clifford Parliman =

Clifford R. Parliman
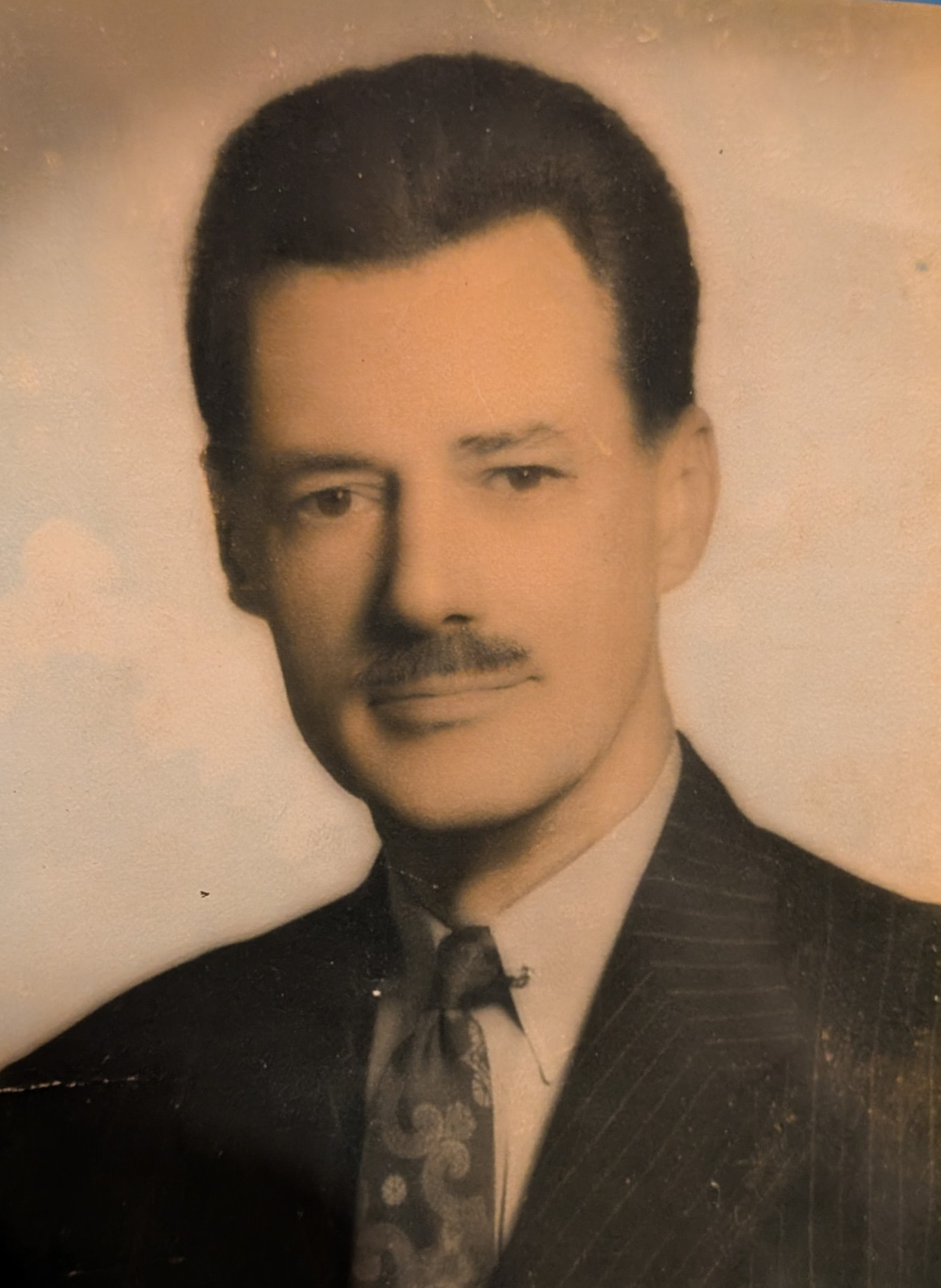
- Clifford R. Parliman
- Born: September 11, 1890; Shelter Island, New York, U.S.
- Died: March 23, 1980 (aged 89); Durango City, Durango, Mexico
- Citizenship: American
- Education: Syracuse University, Massachusetts Institute of Technology
- Occupations: Civil and Industrial engineer, real estate developer
- Years active: 1910s–1960s
- Spouses: Gladys Walton (div.); Dorothy Britton (div.); María del Socorro Esparza

Clifford Parliman was an American regional engineer, real estate promoter, and theater executive active in New York during the late 1920s and early 1930s. He is notable for constructing the first Permutit plant in Brooklyn, New York, for the manufacture of the water softener Permutit. Parliman is also known for spearheading large-scale commercial developments, including the Hillside Theater Corporation, and for his involvement in regional engineering surveys near the Hudson River bridge.

== Early Life and Technical Education ==
Parliman was born on Shelter Island, New York, on September 11, 1890. He pursued an advanced technical education, studying civil engineering at Syracuse University and industrial engineering at the Massachusetts Institute of Technology (MIT). During the First World War, Parliman served as a combat pilot for the French Escadrille.

== Regional Engineering and Real Estate Career ==
By the late 1920s, Parliman transitioned heavily into high-stakes regional engineering and real estate promotion in New York:

- 1928: Parliman spearheaded an ambitious, large-scale $10,000,000 commercial and residential real estate development. While the macroeconomic contraction of the impending Great Depression ultimately prevented the massive project from coming to full fruition, it represented the largest financial design undertaking of his domestic career
- 1930: Operating as president of his firm, "The House of Parliman," he spearheaded preliminary development surveys for state parklands near the New Jersey approach to the new Hudson River bridge, working in coordination with citizens of Englewood and Englewood Cliffs. During this period, his firm was also retained to develop bridge-zone properties owned by the prominent New York real estate developer Dr. Charles V. Paterno.

== Amity Beach and Yacht Club occult connections ==
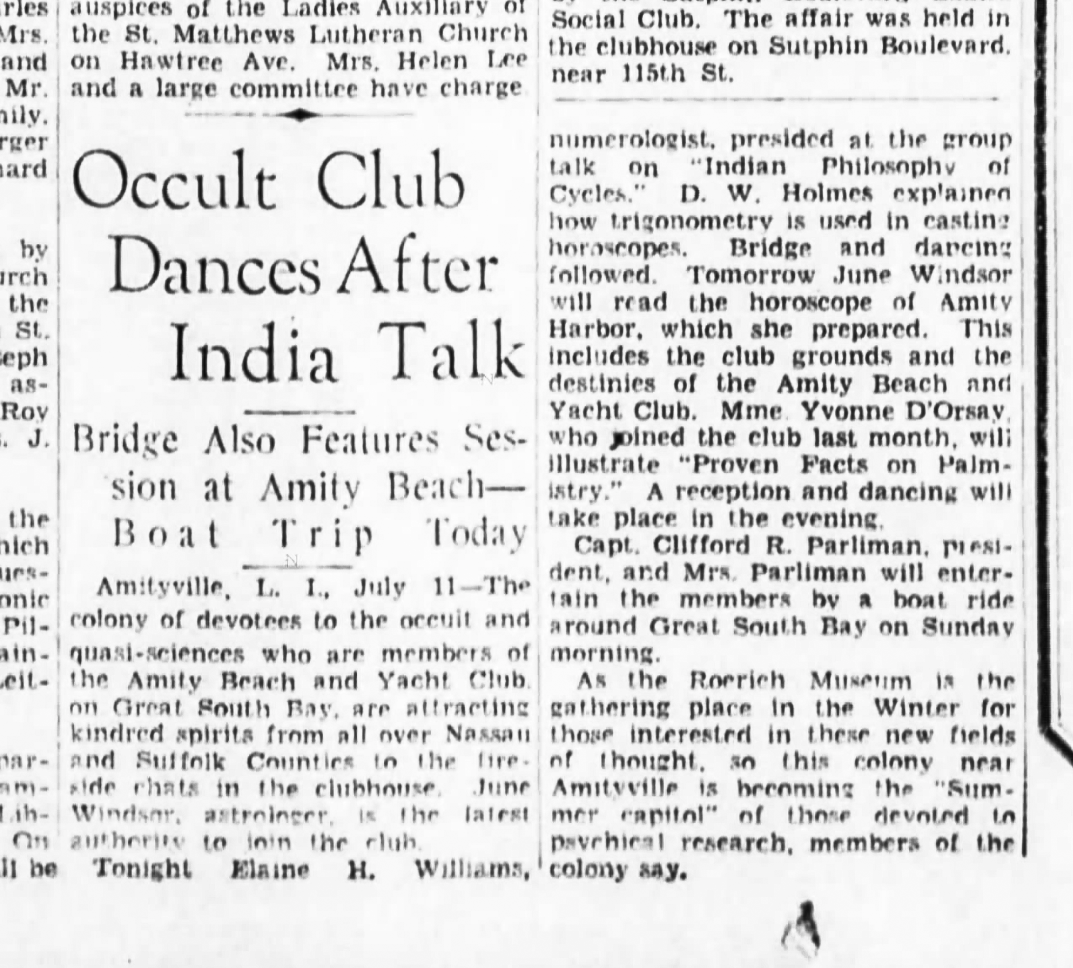
Amity Occult Club Dances After India Talk

In May 1931, Parliman served as the President for a prominent high-society organization dedicated to the study of the occult and quasi-sciences, based out of the Casino of the Amity Beach and Yacht Club in Amityville, Long Island. In this leadership role, Parliman organized weekly lectures, Sunday afternoon meetings, and social events for a highly exclusive membership roster composed of prominent public figures.

Notable members of the group included:

- Captain Frank Hawks: A world-record-breaking aviator.
- Captain Paul H. Schaefer: A veteran Arctic explorer and member of the Wilkins Arctic expedition.
- Henry D. Mildeberger: A Department of Justice (DOJ) investigator, author of "Soul Thoughts" and the founder of the New York Psychical Research Society.
- Vincent Richards: An Olympic gold-medalist tennis champion.
- Dorothy Britton: A Broadway stage star and the 1927 Miss Universe titleholder, whom Parliman would later marry.

== Theater venture, bankruptcy,and legal disputes ==
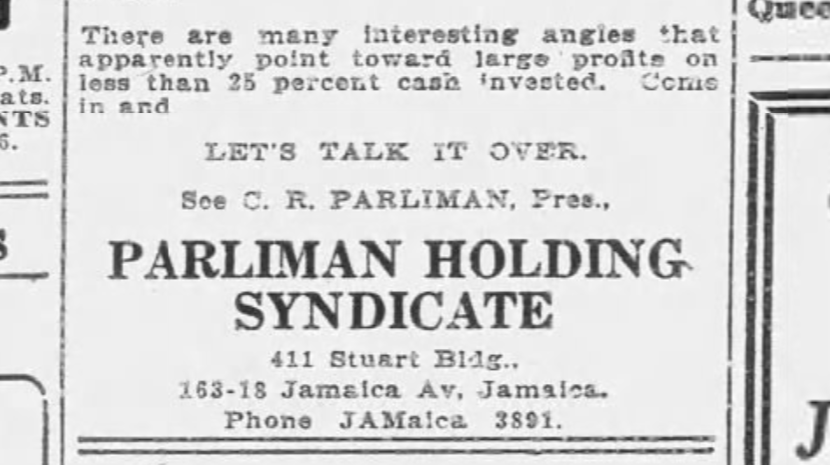
The May 1927 newspaper advertisement for the Parliman Holding Syndicate published in the Brooklyn Daily Eagle.

On Saturday, February 12, 1927, Parliman, who was then president of the Hillside Theater Corporation, announced plans to construct a theater on Hillside Avenue between 217th and 218th streets in Queens Village, New York. He stated that the venue would be larger than most theaters in Manhattan.

A month later, the State Attorney General announced an inquiry in the Brooklyn Daily Times into the affairs of the Hillside Roof Garden Theater. The investigation sought to examine the sales methods and promotional literature used to sell the company's 8 percent preferred stock, after eight salesmen reportedly sold $117,000 worth of stock within a two-week period. The inquiry was initiated following a complaint alleging that the names of real estate operator Joseph P. Day and former U.S. Treasury Secretary William Gibbs McAdoo were being used by stock salesmen without authorization.

Parliman responded to the investigation in May 1927 by placing a newspaper advertisement to solicit further investors, detailing the project's scope and directing interested parties to contact the "Parliman Holding Syndicate." However, faced with complaints from two competitors and the ongoing Attorney General investigation, Parliman was ultimately forced into bankruptcy by December 1927. The financial setback did not deter him from pursuing another multi-million dollar real estate investment the following year.

Parliman's career faced further legal disruptions between July 1932 and July 1934, stemming from legal actions involving his former wife, Gladys Walton—the daughter of prominent Chicago jewelers whom he had married in a widely publicized 1929 ceremony held in an airplane 5,000 feet above Roosevelt Field.

In July 1932, Walton sued Parliman for alimony arrears after her mother accused him of infidelity. Parliman retaliated by filing a $100,000 lawsuit against his mother-in-law for alienation of affection.

While contemporary tabloid accounts heavily sensationalized the scale of the financial dispute—with the Daily News reporting a debt of $4,300—an International News Photos syndicate record documented the actual legal allegation as $420 in arrears since May 1. Parliman was apprehended on a contempt of court charge on July 10, 1934. The arrest publicly exposed his marriage to 1927 International Pageant of Pulchritude winner Dorothy Britton. While early media accounts characterized Britton as living isolated at the project's manor estate, local sheriff statements directly refuted this narrative, noting that Britton actively traveled to visit her husband during his brief confinement. The legal matter was resolved on Saturday, July 14, 1934, when Supreme Court Justice Kenneth O'Brien reviewed the case and ruled in Parliman's favor, declaring he had been "punished enough." Parliman was officially released from the Orange County Jail in Newburgh on Monday, July 16, 1934.

== Industrial Defense and World War II ==
Following his early exploration work, Parliman returned to the United States to assist in the country's industrial mobilization for World War II.

By 1942, at age 52, he registered for the Fourth Registration of the Selective Service. During this period, he was employed as an industrial engineer by Gibbs & Hill, Engineers, operating out of the Pennsylvania Station Building in New York City. In this role, Parliman contributed to high-level engineering projects for a firm heavily contracted to design critical wartime transportation power systems and naval logistics infrastructure.

== International Mining and Later Life in Mexico ==
By the mid-1940s, Parliman transitioned his focus permanently to international mineral exploration, establishing deep roots in the Mexican mining sectors where he managed silver and gold mining campaigns. His operations were based extensively out of Durango, Mexico, as early as 1944. His engineering work across the country's resource sectors was heavily documented in contemporary professional journals, including a comprehensive career retrospective featured in *The Mines Magazine* in August 1960. Managing these mining concerns required regular international travel across the United States border, including a documented crossing into Texas on August 9, 1955.

Parliman settled permanently in Durango City, marrying his fifth wife, María del Socorro Esparza. He continued to reside there following his retirement from active field engineering. Parliman passed away from a cerebral hemorrhage in Durango City on March 23, 1980, at the age of 89, bringing to a close a diverse international career spanning military aviation, real estate development, and industrial engineering.
