= 1928 International Pageant of Pulchritude =

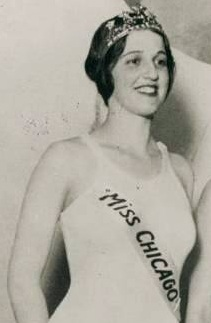
- "Beauty Queen of the Universe" Ella Van Hueson
- Date: June 2–5, 1928
- Venue: Galveston, TX
- Entrants: 42
- Placements: 10
- Debuts: Belgium, England, Germany, (US Cities) Biloxi, Greater New York, Little Rock, Oklahoma City, St. Louis
- Withdrawals: Alexandria, Amarillo, Baton Rouge, Beaumont, Bessemer, Brooklyn, Cleburne, Denver, Douglas, Green Bay, Kerrville, Monroe, Oak Cliff, Ogden, Omaha, Ottawa, Pine Bluff, Point Isabel, Shreveport
- Returns: Nebraska
- Winner: Ella Van Hueson; Chicago

The 1928 International Pageant of Pulchritude was the third annual International Pageant of Pulchritude, held at the Galveston Island Beach Revue in Galveston, Texas from June 2–5, 1928.

At the end of the event, Dorothy Britton of New York City crowned Ella Van Hueson of Chicago as Miss Universe 1928. Raymonde Allain of France was awarded as second-place, while Livia Marracci of Italy was named third-place. Prizes included $2,000 for the winner, $1,000 for the second-place winner, $250 for the third-place winner, and $100 each for the remaining places.

42 contestants from 32 states and cities in the United States and 10 countries competed in the pageant.

== Results ==
=== Placements ===
Placement	Contestant
Miss Universe 1928	Chicago – Ella Van Hueson
Second Place	France – Raymonde Allain
Third Place	Italy – Livia Marracci
Fourth Place	Colorado – Mildred Ellene Golden
Fifth Place	West Virginia – Audrey Reilly
Sixth Place	Canada – Irene Hill
Seventh Place	Luxembourg – Anna Friedrich
Eighth Place	Ohio – Mary Horlocker
Ninth Place	San Antonio – Anna Debrow
Tenth Place	Tulsa – Helen Paris

== Contestants ==
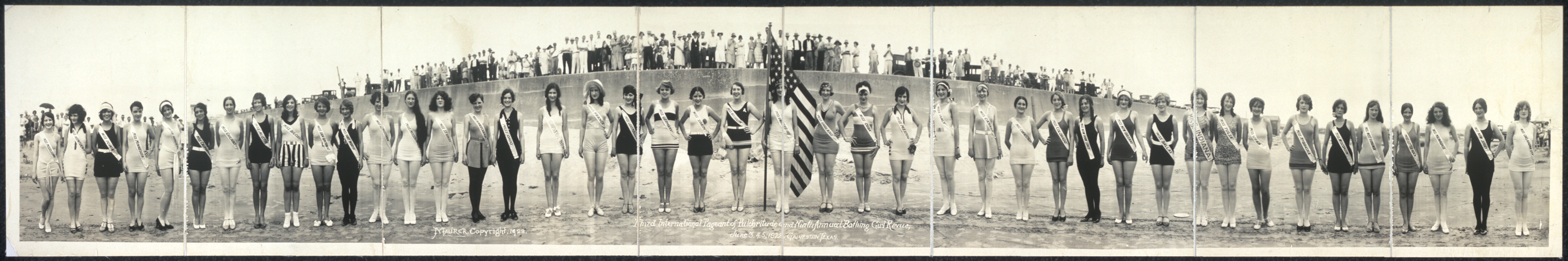
Contestants of the 1928 International Pageant of Pulchritude

42 contestants competed for the title.

=== Contestants from the United States ===
City/State	Contestant	Age (Note: Ages at the time of the competition)	Hometown
Austin, Texas	Irene Wilson		Austin
Biloxi, Mississippi	Fleeta Doyle		Biloxi
California	Geraldine Grimsley		
Chicago, Illinois	Ella Van Hueson	22	Chicago
Colorado	Mildred Ellene Golden	19	Denver
Connecticut	Mary Deano		
Dallas, Texas	Hazel Peck		Dallas
Fort Worth, Texas	Cleo Belle Marshall		Fort Worth
Greater New York	Isabel Waldner		New York City
Houston, Texas	Katherine Miller		Houston
Indiana	Betty Dumpres		Anderson
Iowa	Ethel Mae Frette		
Kentucky	Virginia Mae H. Hendricks		Lexington
Louisiana	Evelyn Smith		
Milwaukee, Wisconsin	Ida Camilla Knudson		Milwaukee
Minnesota	Delores Davitt		
Mississippi	Louise Fayard		
Missouri	Margaret Woods		
Nebraska	Bernice Graf		
New Jersey	Elizabeth K. Smith	17	Irvington
New York	Winnifred Watson		
Ohio	Mary Horlocker		Columbus
Oklahoma City, Oklahoma	Mary Drew		Oklahoma City
Pennsylvania	Anna Dubin		
San Antonio, Texas	Anna Debrow		San Antonio
St. Louis, Missouri	Eunice Gerling		
Tulsa, Oklahoma	Helen Paris		Tulsa
Utah	Eldora Pence		
West Virginia	Audrey Reilley		Charleston
Wisconsin	Betty Porter	16	Janesville

=== Contestants from other countries ===
Country	Contestant	Age	Hometown
Belgium	Anne Koyart	22	Brussels
Canada	Irene Hill		Calgary
Cuba	Nila Garrido	17	Havana
England	Nonni Shields	18	
France	Raymonde Allain	16	Paris
Germany	Hella Hoffman	20	Berlin
Italy	Livia Marracci	18	Rome
Luxembourg	Anna Friedrich	21	Luxembourg City
Mexico	Maria Teresa de Landa	18	
Spain	Aguenda Adorna	18	
