= Spring Fever (1927 film) =

1927 film directed by Edward Sedgwick

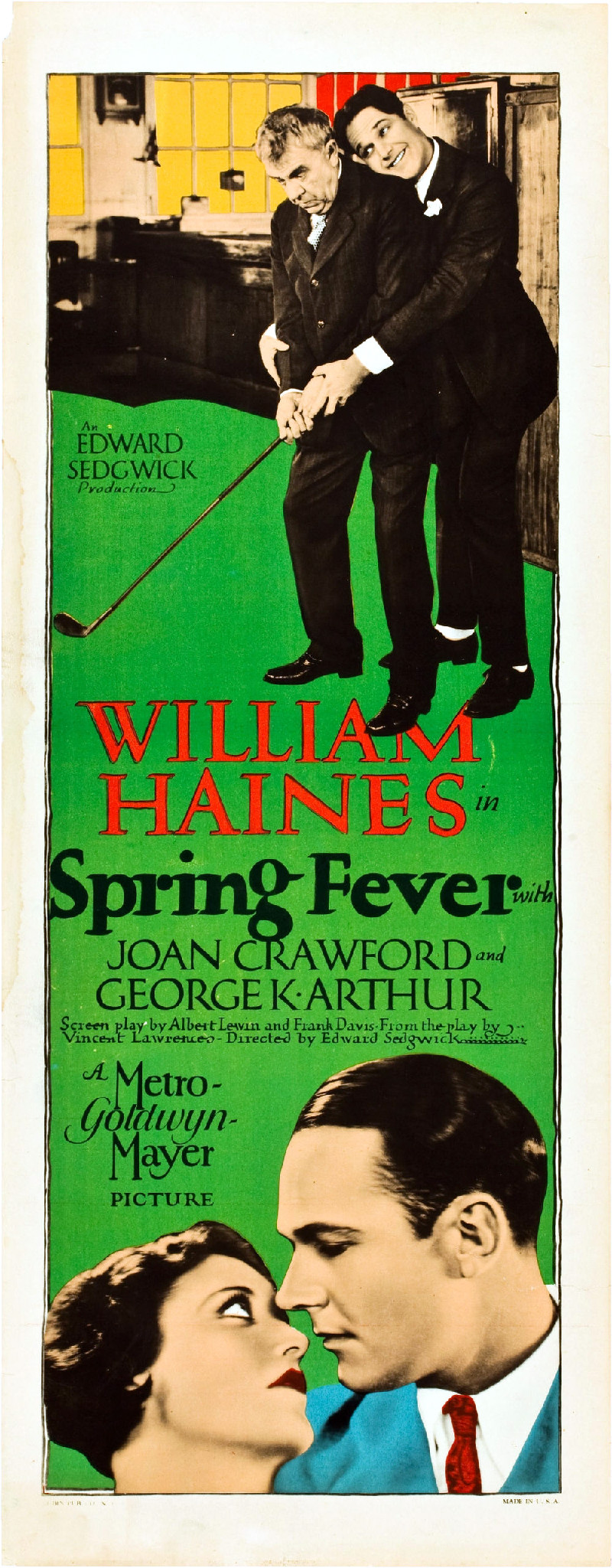
- Theatrical poster
- Directed by: Edward Sedgwick
- Written by: Screenplay: Frank Davis; Albert Lewin; Titles: Ralph Spence; Gag man: Hugh Cummings
- Based on: Spring Fever; 1925 play by Vincent Lawrence
- Starring: William Haines; Joan Crawford; George K. Arthur
- Cinematography: Ira H. Morgan
- Edited by: Frank Sullivan
- Production company: Metro-Goldwyn-Mayer
- Distributed by: Metro-Goldwyn-Mayer
- Release date: October 22, 1927 (NYC)
- Running time: 60 minutes
- Language: Silent (English intertitles)

Spring Fever is a 1927 American silent comedy film starring William Haines, Joan Crawford, and George K. Arthur, and directed by Edward Sedgwick. Based on the 1925 play of the same name by Vincent Lawrence, this was the second film starring Haines and Crawford, and their first onscreen romantic teaming.

Spring Fever was remade as the musical film Love in the Rough in 1930, starring Robert Montgomery and Dorothy Jordan.

Full film

== Plot ==
Jack Kelly, a crack golfer who worked as a shipping clerk for the aging Mr. Waters. One day, Mr. Waters fires Jack's father, Pop Kelly. Jack witnesses this and is outraged. He wants revenge and breaks a window with a golf ball. Mr. Waters catches him but, instead of being mad, he is impressed with Jack's golfing skills. He later that day announces to his dad he is invited by The Oakmont Country Club to be a guest of the club for a minimum of two weeks. His role there will be the teacher of Mr. Waters, trying to teach him how to golf. Pop doesn't want to say goodbye, but lets him go.

At the club, he meets Allie Monte and immediately falls in love with her. He introduces himself as a member from the shipping business of her family. However, Allie sees through him and walks away. Harold Johnson is the club champion and devotes himself to Allie. He tries to get her attention at a game, but she is not charmed with his presence. Over the days, the members – including Allie – become more pleased with Jack as he teaches everyone how to golf.

Jack and Allie bond with each other. Johnson feels intimidated by Jack, fearing he could take over the championship title and his girl. Jack kisses Allie, but she storms off. He tries to apologize, but she refuses to talk to him. Therefore, he climbs into her room, staying there until she forgives him.

The next day, Jack sets a record with the golf tournament. While giving his victory speech, he notices his father, who came there to tell his son how proud he is of him. Jack realizes his club membership is almost over and swears he will marry a rich girl, which would make him allowed to stay at the club. He decides to propose to Allie, but she informs him her father has just lost all of his money. She admits she now has to marry a wealthy man to keep her social position.

They are interrupted by Martha Lomsdom, who invites them to a party. On their way, Jack sees Allie is flirting with Johnson, so he does the same with the wealthy Martha. At the party, Johnson announces he and Allie are engaged. Jack is devastated, but Martha sees an opportunity in luring him. Her beau confronts her, but she responds she is willing to leave him for Jack. Jack now admits he is not the person to marry for money. When he meets up with Allie to say goodbye, he realizes he can't live without her and tells her he loves her.

Allie admits she loves him too, but reminds him she is already engaged to Johnson. They decide to run off and marry. Allie tells her dad Jack is a millionaire shipping man. Jack is afraid to tell her the truth about his income. But when he does, she throws him out. Her family tells her it's a good riddance and she should get an annulment. Allie however refuses, stating he is her husband. In the final scene, Jack becomes rich with winning a golf tournament and is reunited with Allie.

== Cast ==
- William Haines as Jack Kelly
- Joan Crawford as Allie Monte
- George K. Arthur as Eustace Tewksbury
- George Fawcett as Mr. Waters
- Eileen Percy as Martha Lomsdom
- Edward Earle as (Harry) Johnson
- Bert Woodruff as Pop (Pa) Kelly
- Lee Moran as Oscar, the caddy
- Edward Brophy as man holding score card on golf course (uncredited)
- Joseph Harrington as desk clerk at Waters & Co. (uncredited)
- Helen Brent (uncredited)

== Production ==
Location shooting for Spring Fever took place at Riviera Country Club in Pacific Palisades, California.

=== Crew ===
- Cedric Gibbons – Settings
- David Townsend – Settings

== Reception ==
Spring Fever was a great success despite some critical misgivings about the film itself. Variety said "Haines is a likable personality and should travel far. This picture, however, will not help him much. The players do well all around and Ralph Spence's titles contribute effectively on the comedy end, but the director, Sedgwick, could not cope with a weak theme." Author Lawrence J. Quirk later wrote of Joan Crawford's performance that "she manages to make her presence felt, and looks lovely as usual, despite it being a walk-through role."

The film proved to be so popular that the following year, William Haines was mobbed by fans at a personal appearance a professional golf tournament.

== Remakes ==
Love in the Rough, a M-G-M musical released in 1930, starring Robert Montgomery and Dorothy Jordan, and directed by Charles F. Reisner, was also based on Vincent Lawrence's 1925 play Spring Fever.

== Restoration ==
The film was restored by Turner Entertainment in 2008, with a score by Darrell Raby. It was shown on Turner Classic Movies.

== Home media ==
In March 2009, Spring Fever was released on manufactured-on-demand DVD through the Warner Archive Collection.
