= Love in the Rough =

1930 film

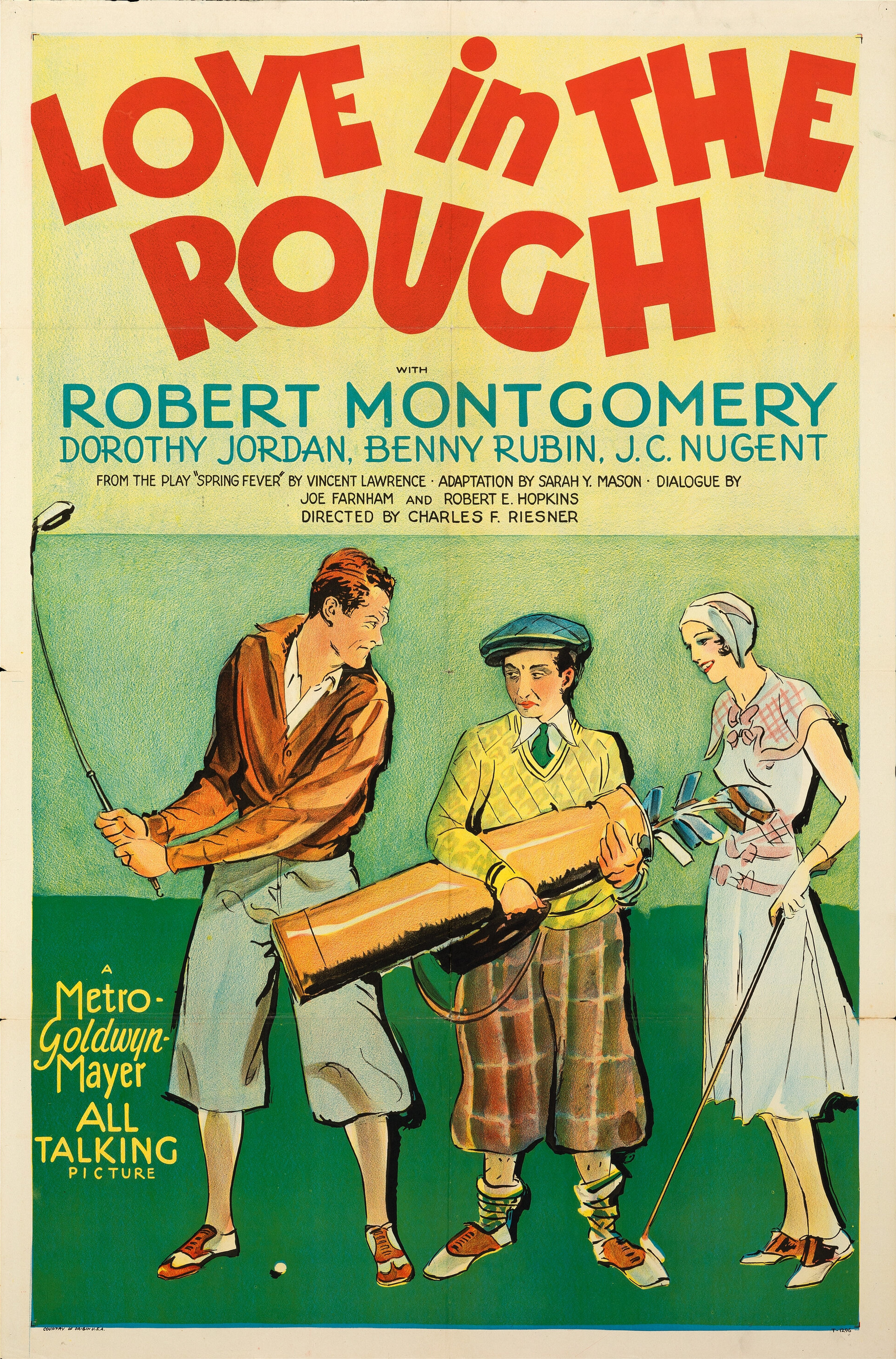
- Theatrical release poster
- Directed by: Charles Reisner
- Screenplay by: Sarah Y. Mason; Joseph Farnham; Robert E. Hopkins
- Based on: Spring Fever; 1925 play by Vincent Lawrence
- Starring: Robert Montgomery; Dorothy Jordan; Benny Rubin; J. C. Nugent; Penny Singleton; Tyrell Davis
- Cinematography: Henry Sharp
- Edited by: Basil Wrangell
- Production company: Metro-Goldwyn-Mayer
- Distributed by: Metro-Goldwyn-Mayer
- Release date: September 6, 1930
- Running time: 84 minutes
- Country: United States
- Language: English

Love in the Rough is a 1930 American pre-Code comedy film directed by Charles Reisner and written by Sarah Y. Mason, Joseph Farnham and Robert E. Hopkins. The film stars Robert Montgomery, Dorothy Jordan, Benny Rubin, J. C. Nugent, Penny Singleton and Tyrell Davis.

Also a musical, it is a remake of the 1927 silent comedy Spring Fever. The film was released on September 6, 1930, by Metro-Goldwyn-Mayer.

== Plot ==
Mr Waters learns his shipping clerk, Jack, is a champion golfer, and pays him to spend two weeks at an exclusive club, to coach him for a forthcoming competition. Jack’s friend Benny goes along as his valet and caddy.

Jack falls in love with Marilyn, daughter of a wealthy businessman. Rumours spread that he is the head of a major shipping company, and Waters advises Jack not to mislead Marilyn.

Jack and Marilyn elope, but on their wedding night he confesses and leaves.

At the golf competition the next day, Jack is not playing at his best. But Marilyn’s father, delighted to learn his new son-in-law is a golfer, reunites him with Marilyn and he wins the game.

== Cast ==
- Robert Montgomery as Kelly
- Dorothy Jordan as Marilyn
- Benny Rubin as Benny
- J. C. Nugent as Waters
- Penny Singleton as Virgie
- Tyrell Davis as Tewksbury
- Harry Burns as Gardener
- Allan Lane as Johnson
- Catherine Moylan as Martha
- Edwards Davis as Williams
- Roscoe Ates as Proprietor
- Clarence Wilson as Brown
- George Chandler as Taxi Driver
- Donald Novis as Crooner
