= Our Blushing Brides =

1930 film

- Theatrical release poster
- Directed by: Harry Beaumont (uncredited)
- Written by: Bess Meredyth; John Howard Lawson; Edwin Justus Mayer; Helen Meinardi (uncredited)
- Produced by: Harry Beaumont
- Starring: Joan Crawford; Anita Page; Dorothy Sebastian; Robert Montgomery
- Cinematography: Merritt B. Gerstad
- Edited by: George Hively; Harold Palmer (uncredited)
- Production company: Metro-Goldwyn-Mayer
- Distributed by: Metro-Goldwyn-Mayer
- Release date: July 19, 1930
- Running time: 99 minutes
- Country: United States
- Language: English
- Budget: $337,000
- Box office: $1,211,000

Our Blushing Brides is a 1930 American pre-Code society comedy/romantic melodrama directed and produced by Harry Beaumont and starring Joan Crawford, Robert Montgomery, Anita Page and Dorothy Sebastian.

The film follows Our Dancing Daughters (1928) and Our Modern Maidens (1929), which also starred Crawford, Page and Sebastian, though they portray different characters in each film. Although the two previous installments in the series were silent films, Our Blushing Brides is a sound film, a relatively new technology at the time.

Our Blushing Brides is Crawford's 31st film (of 86 total), and her fourth sound film. In her first "shopgirl-Cinderella" role, Crawford plays the role of Gerry, a department store model who falls in love with the wealthy son of her boss. The role was a departure from Crawford's flapper-girl persona of the silent era as Metro-Goldwyn-Mayer began to develop a more sophisticated image for her.

Art Direction was led by Cedric Gibbons; costume design was by Adrian (costume designer).

== Plot ==
Our Blushing Brides (1930)

Fellow department store shopgirls and roommates Gerry March, Connie Blair and Franky Daniels take different paths in New York City but all seek to marry wealthy men. Connie pursues an affair with David Jardine, the youngest son of the store's owner. Franky meets the slick-talking Marty Sanderson when he comes into the store to buy $500 worth of blankets. However, when he comes to meet Franky, he makes advances toward Gerry instead.

Gerry has been constantly courted by the dashing Tony Jardine, the older son of the store owner. He is used to having his way, but when he invites only Gerry to visit his estate, Gerry, who believes that virtue will be her only reward, rebuffs Tony and intimates that he is childish.

Franky falls in love with Marty, who spoils her with diamonds and silk. Gerry is suspicious, especially when she finds them both drunk. The girls do not know that Sanderson is the leader of a criminal gang that steals from department stores such as the one where the women work. The police arrive to apprehend Franky, believing that she is a member of the gang, but she knows nothing of it.

Connie is very happy with David and intends to marry him. However, she reads in the newspaper that David intends to marry the high-society Evelyn Woodforth. She listens to the wedding reception as it is broadcast on the radio and ingests poison in a suicide attempt. Gerry finds her and then asks Tony to persuade David to leave the reception to visit Connie.

In a contentious conversation, Tony forces David to visit Connie, a selfless act that attracts Gerry and convinces her that Tony is a good man. However, despite David's visit, Connie dies.

== Cast ==
- Joan Crawford as Geraldine “Gerry” March
- Anita Page as Connie Blair
- Dorothy Sebastian as Francine Daniels
- Robert Montgomery as Tony Jardine
- Raymond Hackett as David Jardine
- John Miljan as Martin W. "Marty" Sanderson
- Hedda Hopper as Lansing Ross-Weaver
- Albert Conti as Monsieur Pantoise
- Edward Brophy as Joseph Munsey
- Robert Emmett O'Connor as Detective
- Martha Sleeper as Evelyn Woodforth
- Gwen Lee as Miss Dardinelle
- Mary Doran as Mannequin
- Claire Dodd as Mannequin
- Norma Drew as Mannequin
- Catherine Moylan as Mannequin
- Wilda Mansfield as Mannequin
- Louise Beavers as the Mannequin's maid (uncredited)
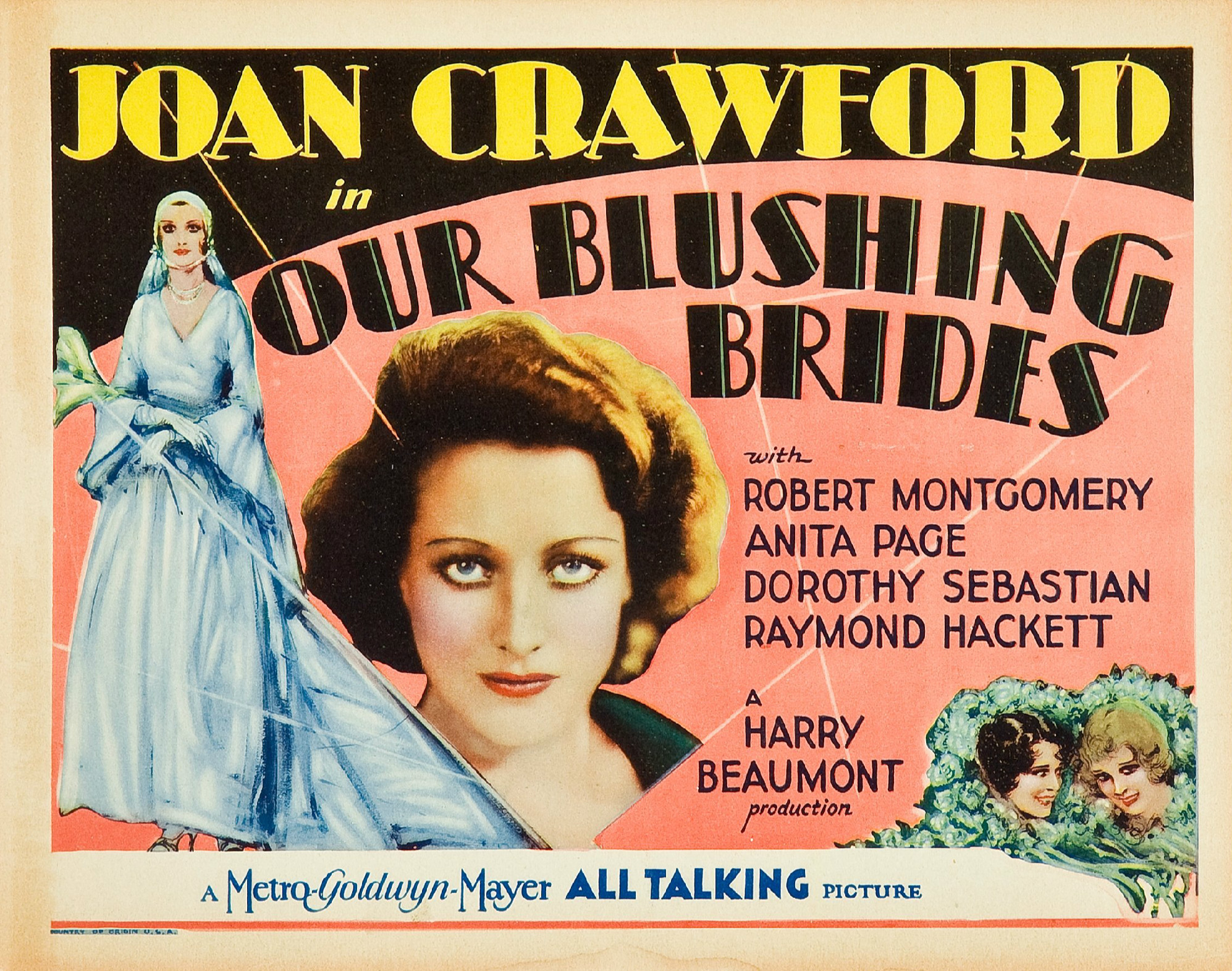

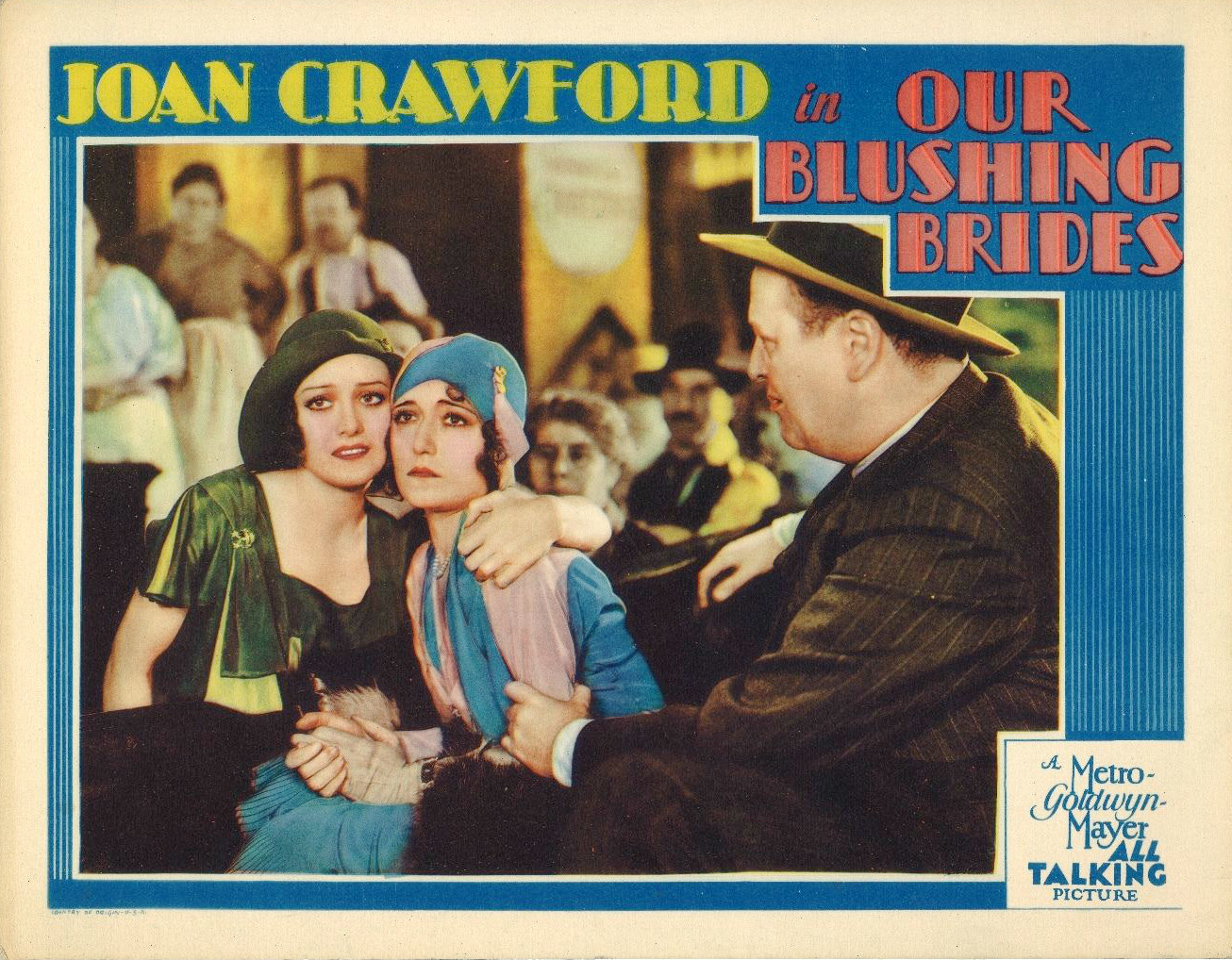

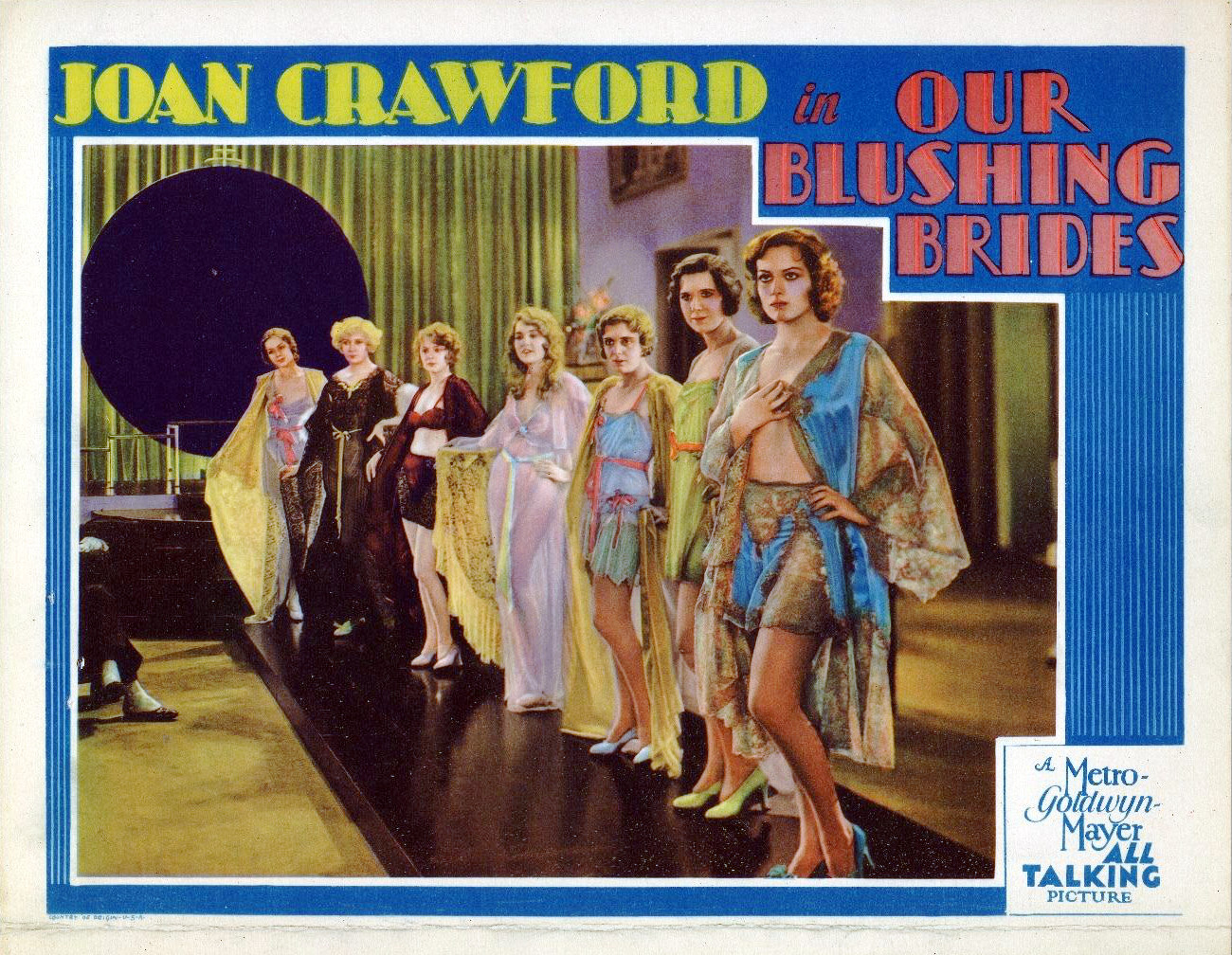

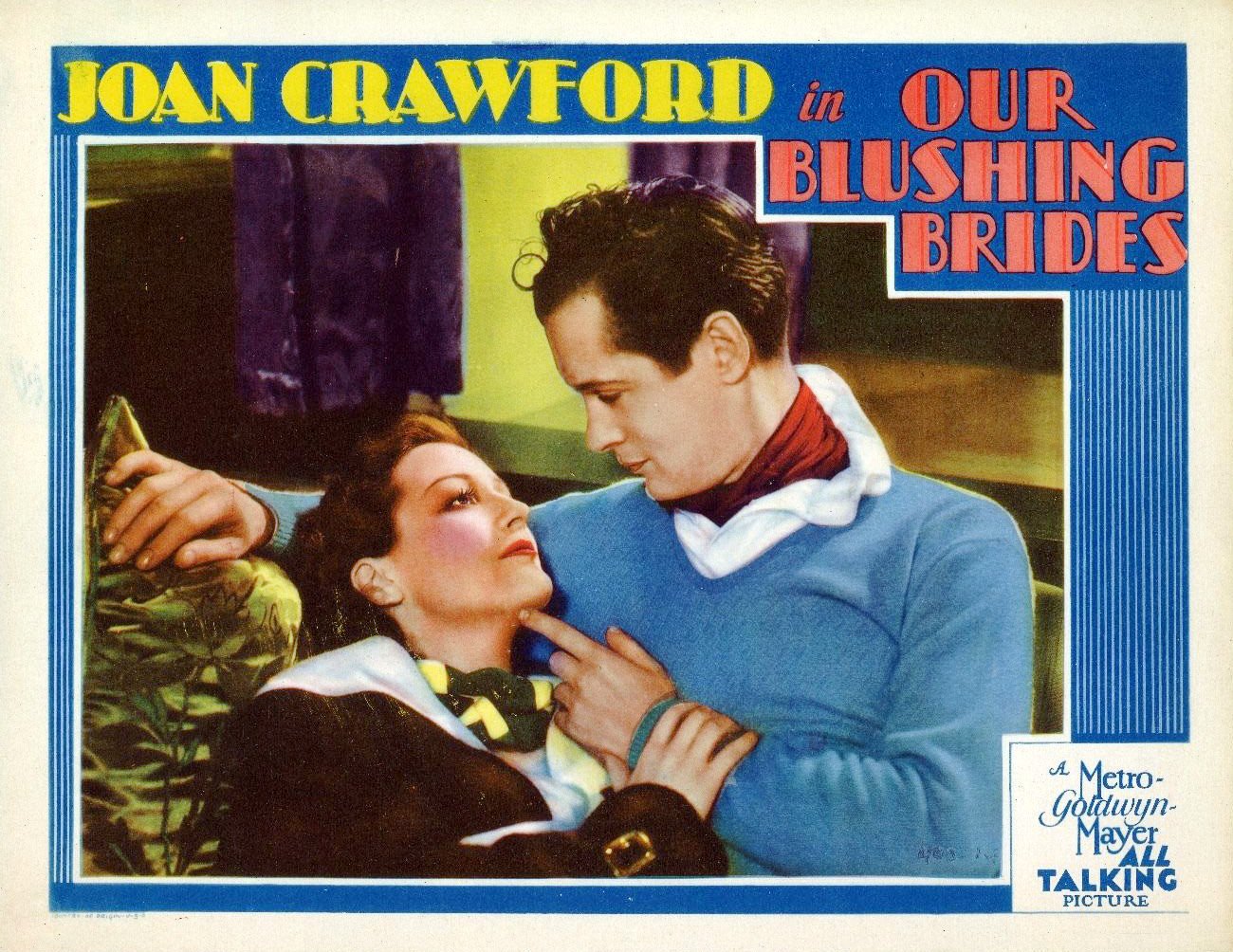

== Box office ==
According to MGM records, the film earned $874,000 in the U.S. and Canada and $337,000 elsewhere, resulting in a profit of $412,000.

== Home media ==
Warner Archive Collection released the film as a Region 1 DVD on March 4, 2014.
