= Raymonde Allain =

French model and actress (1912–2008)

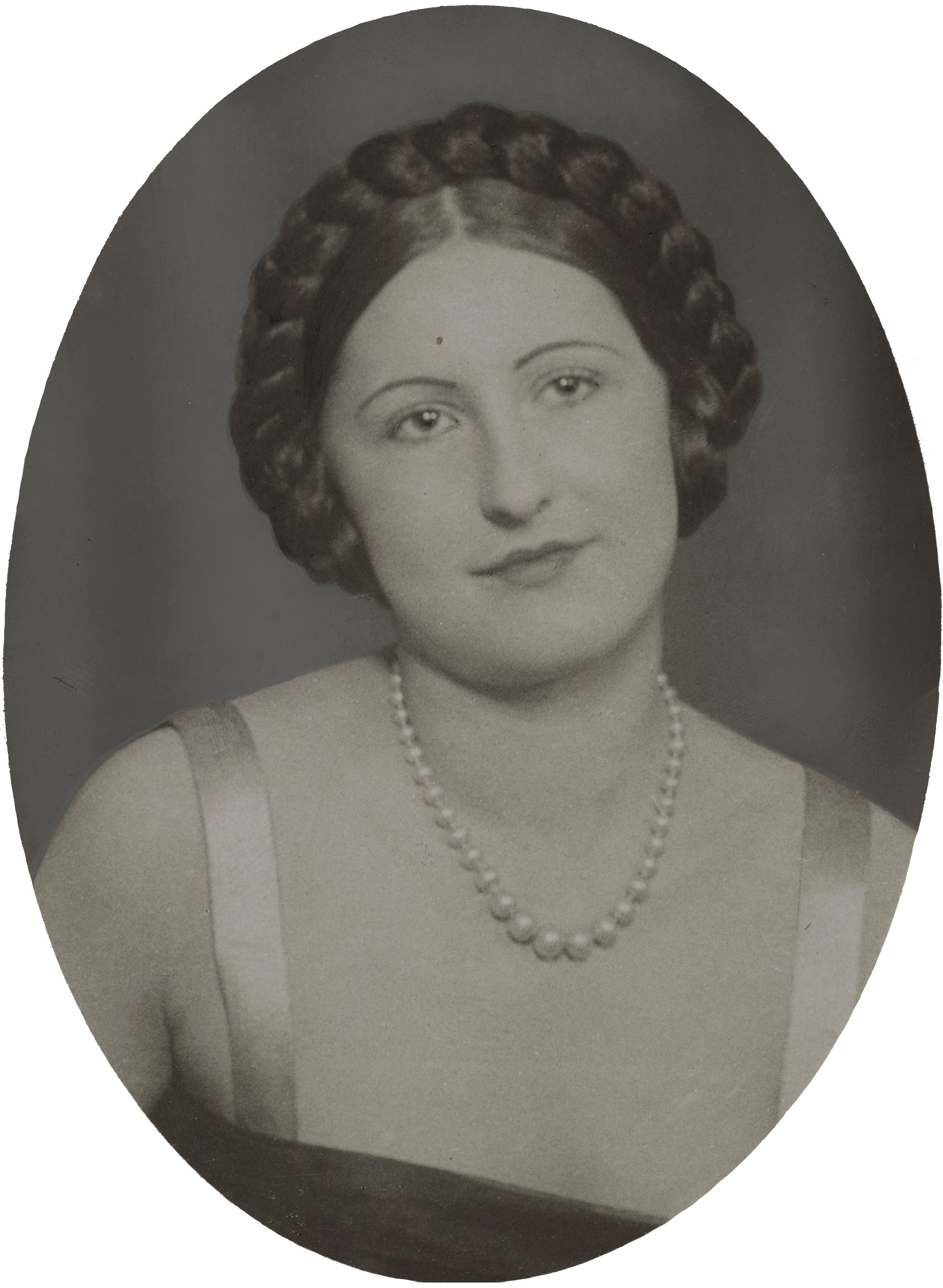
- Raymonde Allain between 1927 and 1928
- Born: 22 June 1912; Paris, France
- Died: 27 July 2008 (aged 96); Paris, France
- Other name: Raymonde Jeanne Simone Allain
- Occupations: Actress, Model
- Years active: 1928-1950 (film)

Raymonde Allain (22 June 1912 – 27 July 2008) was a French model and actress. She was Miss France in 1928. Her participation in the Miss Universe contest drew international media attention, and her controversial loss to American Ella Van Hueson prompted critical dispute over what counted as "real beauty". Allain later wrote an autobiography titled Histoire vraie d'un prix de beauté.

== Selected filmography ==
- Nothing But Lies (1933) as Angèle
- The Tunnel (1933) as Ethel Lloyd
- The Pearls of the Crown (1937) as L'impératrice Eugénie
- The Paris Waltz (1950) again as L'impératrice Eugénie

== Bibliography ==
- Histoire vraie d'un prix de beauté, Gallimard, 1933, OCLC 9860441
