= 1926 International Pageant of Pulchritude =

1926 beauty pageant

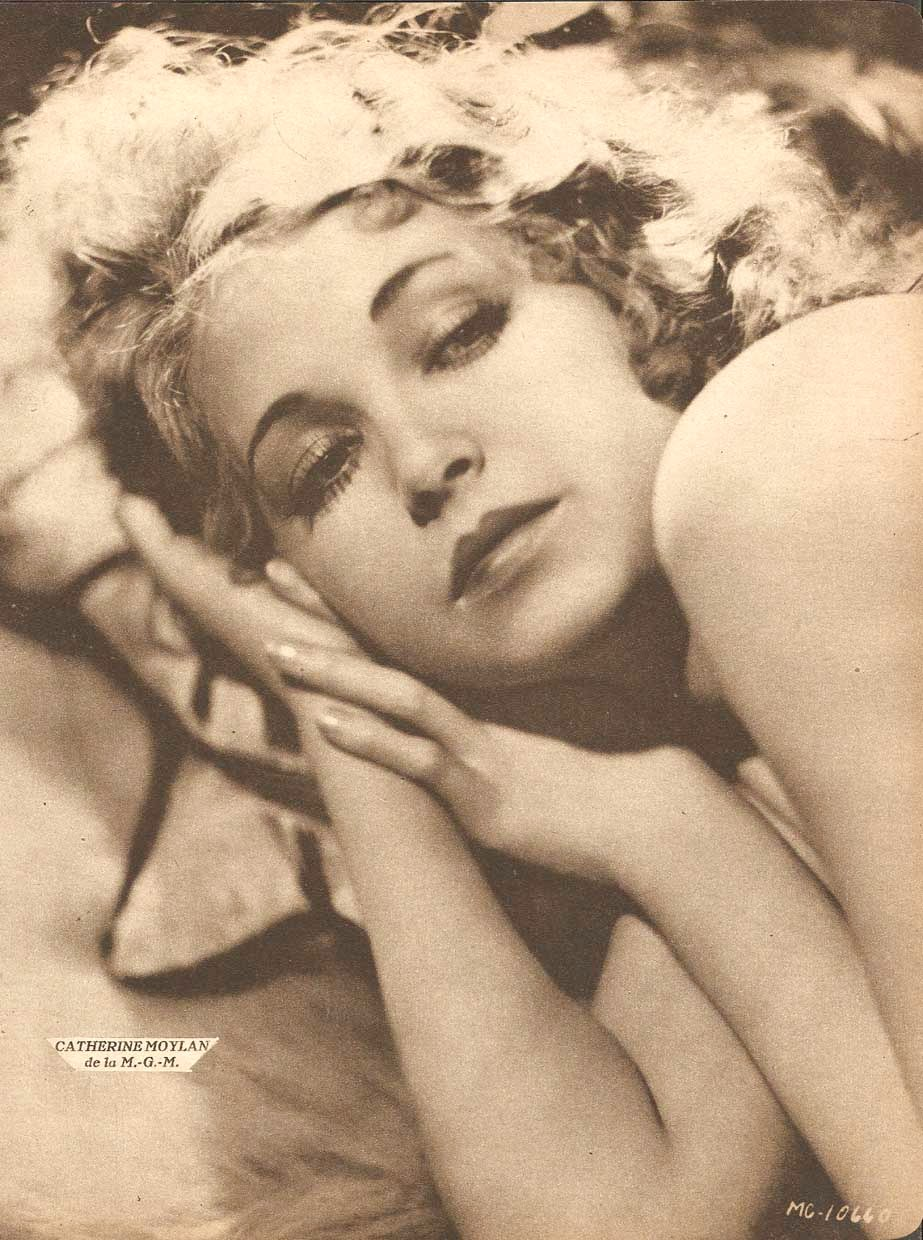
- "Beauty Queen of the Universe" Catherine Moylan
- Date: May 15, 1926 - May 17, 1926
- Venue: Galveston, Texas
- Entrants: 39
- Placements: 12
- Winner: Catherine Moylan; Dallas

The First International Pageant of Pulchritude and Seventh Annual Bathing Girl Revue, was a beauty pageant held from May 15 to 17, 1926, in Galveston, Texas. The previous editions of the Galveston Bathing Girl Revue had only featured contestants from the United States. However, during the 1926 event, one contestant from Mexico and another from Canada entered, giving the pageant its first international competitors. It was reported that around 160,000 people watched the bathing costume parade on the afternoon of the 16th.

Miss Dallas, Catherine Moylan, won the event, becoming the first Beauty Queen of the Universe.

== Events ==
The contestants began to arrive in Galveston on May 13. Señorita Mexico Maria Martha Perres and Miss Winnipeg Patricia O'Shea, both international entries, notably arrived on that first day, amid a crowd of curious onlookers. The opening parade was held on May 15, with the pageant itself held on May 16. The prizes were given out at the American Beauty Ball, held at the Garden of Tokio in Galveston, which was accompanied by music from various bands such as the Missouri Pacific band, and the Southern Pacific band.

== Results ==
I'm really overwhelmed by the results of the pageant, and my good fortune is almost more than I had hoped for. But I really don't feel much different than yesterday, when I was no more than 'Miss Dallas.'

— Catherine Moylan, Beauty Queen of the Universe 1926, Galveston Daily News

Miss Dallas, Catherine Moylan, won first place in the pageant and was crowned Beauty Queen of the Universe. It was the second time in a row that Miss Dallas won the competition. For winning, Moylan received $2000, and a gold and silver plaque engraved with "Beauty Queen of the Universe". After the competition, Moylan had revealed in an interview that she would use the prize money to attend Southern Methodist University in Dallas. She also gave credit to Dorothy Stahl, her coach, for her win.

The second-place winner received $1000, the third $250, and the remaining nine places received $100 each.

Judging was based on "beauty, form, grace, and personal charm." Costumes, props, and other decorations were not considered.

=== Placements ===
Place	Contestant
1st	Miss Dallas - Catherine Moylan
2nd	Miss New Orleans - Gladys Moore
3rd	Miss Winnipeg - Patricia O'Shea
4th	Señorita Mexico - Maria Martha Perres
5th	Miss Tulsa Rose - Pauline Mason
6th	Miss Palestine - Arylie Mae Hiser
7th	Miss Nebraska - Grace Tolsen
8th	Miss Shreveport - Pauline Zacharias
9th	Miss Wichita Falls - Frances Rutledge
10th	Miss Jefferson City, Mo. - Evelyn Manchester
11th	Miss Groesbeck - Lois Ford
12th	Dallas - Rosebud Blondell

== Delegates ==
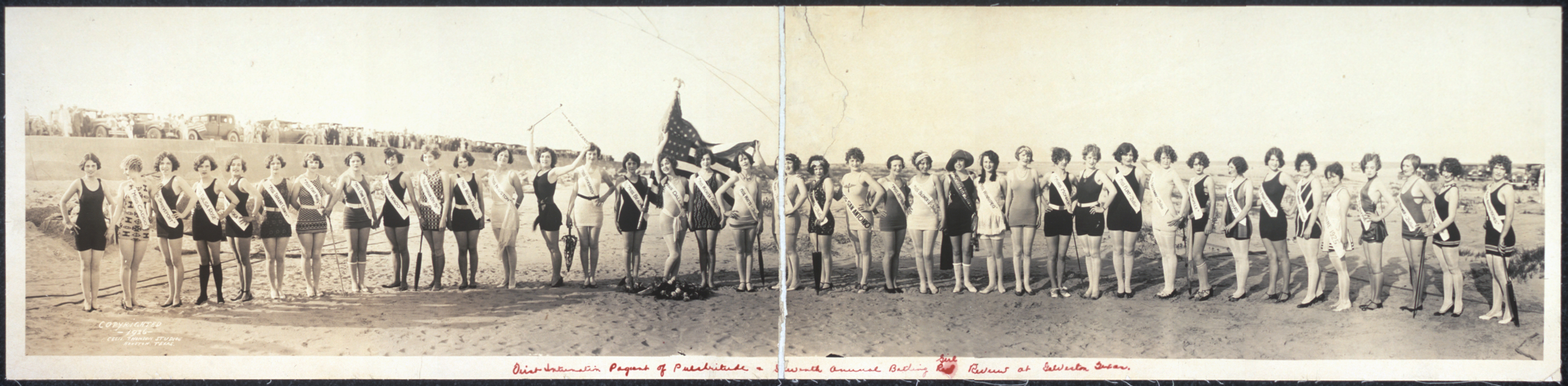
The 39 contestants of the First International Pageant of Pulchritude line up at the beach in Galveston, Texas.

Thirty-nine women entered the contest in 1926, with most coming from Texas and its surrounding states. The presence of contestants Maria Martha Parres from Mexico and Patricia O'Shea from Winnipeg, Manitoba, Canada, made the competition Galveston's first international event.

=== Contestants ===
- Señorita Mexico - Maria Martha Parres
- Miss Winnipeg - Patricia O'Shea
- Miss Jefferson County - Dorothy Burnham
- Miss Nebraska - Grace Tolsen
- Miss Tarrant County - Gladys Bullock
- Miss Wichita County - Frances Oden
- Miss Beaumont - Estelle Johnston
- Miss Brownsville - Mary Stillwell
- Miss Caddo - Jacquetta Calvin
- Miss Cane River Lake - Louella Porter
- Miss Cleveland - Constance Martin
- Miss Dallas - Catherine Moylan
- Miss Ellington Field - Margie Collins
- Miss Fort Worth - Vivian Cayce
- Miss Groesbeck - Lois Ford
- Miss Houston - Karen Hall
- Miss Jefferson City - Evelyn Manchester
- Miss Monroe - Mary Mcvay
- Miss Natchitoches - Peggy O'Neil
- Miss New Orleans - Gladys Moore
- Miss Palestine - Arylie Mae Hiser
- Miss Port Arthur - Beatrice Smith
- Miss San Antonio - Lola Beazley
- Miss Shreveport - Pauline Zacharias
- Miss Tulsa - Pauline Mason
- Miss Waco - Maurice Reed
- Miss Wichita Falls - Frances Rutledge
- Barbara Brewer - Dallas
- Clyde McConathy - Beaumont
- Elalu Watts - Dallas
- Freddie Mae Henkel - Dallas
- Grace Weber - Houston
- Lola Bernhardt - Beaumont
- Lorraine Gazzaway - Dallas
- Lulu Buchanan - Houston
- Maiden Maxwell - Dallas
- Marie Evans - Dallas
- Pearl Flint - Dallas
- Rosebud Blondell - Dallas
