= Catherine Moylan =

American actress (1904–1969)

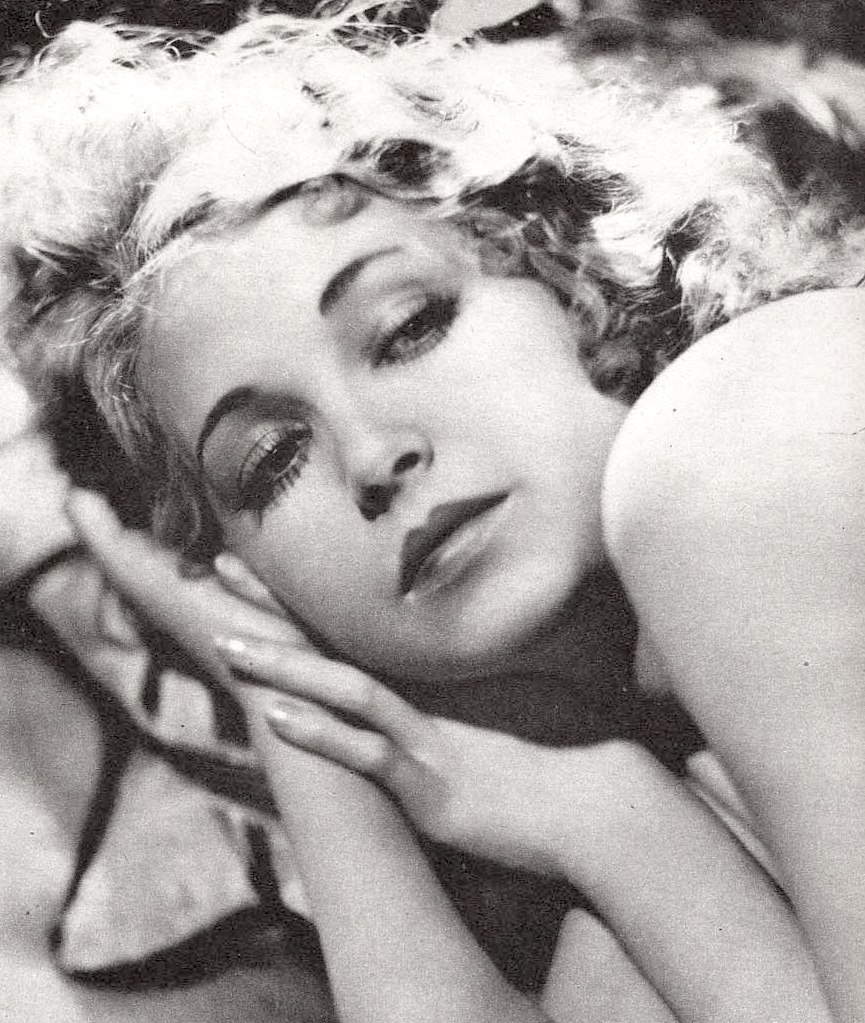
- Moylan in 1931
- Born: July 4, 1904; Rochester, New York, U.S.
- Died: September 9, 1969 (aged 65); Fort Worth, Texas, U.S.
- Occupations: Actress; model
- Spouse: John H. Singleton (m. 1931; div. 1939)
- Children: 1

Catherine May Moylan (July 4, 1904 – September 9, 1969) was an American film actress, model, and beauty queen who won the 1926 International Pageant of Pulchritude. She subsequently appeared in two Broadway productions before having a short film career, including roles in Our Blushing Brides and Love in the Rough (both 1930).

From the mid-1930s onward, Moylan spent the remainder of her life living outside the public eye in Fort Worth, Texas, where she died in 1969 of heart failure.

== Biography ==
Catherine May Moylan was born July 4, 1904, to Catherine Mary (née Sharkey) and William Moylan; her mother was an Irish immigrant, born in County Cork, Ireland. Though Moylan was born in the United States, sources differ as to her precise birthplace: Moylan herself reported that she was born in Philadelphia, Pennsylvania on her daughter's 1932 birth certificate, but Moylan's death certificate issued by the state of Texas states she was born in Rochester, New York.

Moylan was raised in Dallas, Texas. In 1926, after winning the title of Miss Dallas, Moylan competed in and won the Galveston-held International Pageant of Pulchritude, and was crowned "Beauty Queen of the Universe." She subsequently made her Broadway debut in the Ziegfeld Follies of 1927, and subsequently appeared in the original Broadway production of Whoopee! (1928).

In 1930, Moylan appeared in a minor bit part in the Joan Crawford-starring film Our Blushing Brides, followed by a supporting role in the Western Love in the Rough the same year. Moylan continued to work as a model, appearing in advertisements in 1931 for swimsuits.

Sometime in the 1930s, Moylan returned to Texas, settling in Fort Worth, where she lived the rest of her life outside the public eye. She married Los Angeles real estate magnate John H. Singleton in the spring of 1931, and remained married to him until 1939 when the couple divorced. The couple had one daughter, Sylvia. Singleton was an heir to a $5,000,000 (equivalent to $115,729,665 in 2025) estate left behind by his father, a venture capitalist from St. Louis. Moylan filed for divorce from Singleton in early 1939, claiming that Singleton had deserted the marriage, and was awarded custody of the couple's daughter. In the divorce agreement, Moylan was granted $100 per month in child support, as well as a $25,000 settlement, followed by a $15,000 sum two years after the divorce.

== Death ==
Moylan died at her home in Fort Worth on September 9, 1969, aged 65. Per her official death certificate, her cause of death was attributed to rheumatic heart disease, though it was indicated that she suffered a number of secondary health issues, including chronic alcoholism, hypothyroidism, and longstanding pulmonary hypertension. She was also noted as possessing a "psychopathic personality." Her funeral was held at St. Andrew Catholic Church in Fort Worth, where she was a member. She was interred at Mount Olivet Cemetery. Moylan was survived by her daughter, who resided in British Columbia at the time of Moylan's death, as well as numerous grandchildren.

== Filmography ==
Year	Title	Role	Notes	Ref.
1927	See You in Jail	Bit part	Uncredited	
1930	Our Blushing Brides	Mannequin		
1930	Way Out West	Carnival Show Girl	Uncredited	
1930	Love in the Rough	Martha		
1931	Ambitious People		Short film	
1936	Any Old Port		Short film	

== Stage credits ==
Year	Title	Role	Notes	Ref.
1927	Ziegfeld Follies of 1927	Dancer	New Amsterdam Theatre	
1928	Whoopee!	Ziegfeld Glorified Girl	New Amsterdam Theatre	
