= Cinzia Giorgio =

Italian writer (born 1975)

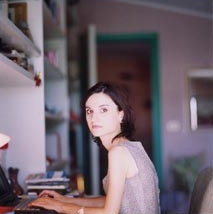
- Cinzia Giorgio, in 2007.
- Born: Cinzia Giorgio; April 1, 1975 (age 51); Venosa, Italy
- Education: University of Naples Federico II
- Occupation: Novelist
- Spouse: Giovanni Scattone (m. 2001)
- Website: www.cinziagiorgio.com

Cinzia Giorgio (born April 1, 1975, in Venosa, Province of Potenza) is an Italian writer.

== Biography ==
Cinzia Giorgio was born in Venosa, Italy, in April 1975. She has a degree in modern literature at University of Naples Federico II, her thesis was about the history of the renaissance. She has also earned a second degree in Oriental languages and has a specialisation in women's studies and archaeology. In 2001 she married Giovanni Scattone, a former assistant professor convicted of the manslaughter of student Marta Russo (1997).

In 2002 she won a scholarship from the Bellonci Foundation in Rome, which organises the Strega Prize.

She is currently Professor of Women's Studies and Art History at the Uni.Spe.D. of Rome and she has a PhD in comparative literature from Roma Tre University. She is also the director of the creative writing school of Rome Scuola Romana di Scrittura.

She has published articles for online newspapers "Poste italiane" (Italian post office) and "Special Olympics". She has published articles for magazines: "Anna" (one of the most important Italian magazine), "AIFI", "Spirit", "Nuovi Orizzonti", "Grand Hotel" and "Confidenze". She has worked with the French weekly "Neus Deux" writing novels and short stories. She has also worked with Warde Jones press office – c/o Foreign Press of Rome, with the director Massimo Tonna and with the Basilicata Region press office .

She writes for the online magazine "Sherlock Magazine" and teaches Creative Writing. She is also writing plays for the Theater. She has her own literary review in Pink Magazine Italia.

In December 2007 she was invited to "Niente di Personale", a talk show broadcast on Italian TV La7, where she presented the novel "Sotto il fiume". Taking inspiration from the novel she wrote a theatre play directed by Flavia Ricci.

On August 4, 2009, and on October 17, 2009, she was the guest of the evening newscast on La7, where she presented her novels I custodi dell'Acqua and Incognito. From March 2010 she collaborates with the website, Velut Luna Press specialised in literary reviews. In 2011 she one of the five candidates to the Mondadori Mystery Award Premio Tedeschi with the novel L'Enigma Botticelli published in 2013. She is also the organizer of the Roman Salon Littéraire (Literary conferences) at the Leusso Academy.

In 2014 for the Italian publishing house Rizzoli she wrote "Prime catastrofiche impressioni" and "Cosa Farebbe Jane?" the first two novels of the series "Le ragazze di Jane Austen".

In November 2014 came out her essay on the erotic history of Italy, "Storia Erotica d'Italia" published by Newton Compton.

== Works ==
=== Novels ===
- (in English) Mary Magdalene, Newton Compton 2018. ISBN 9788822720863
- (in Italian) La piccola libreria di Venezia, Newton Compton 2017. ISBN 9788822712721
- (in Italian) La collezionista di libri proibiti, Newton Compton 2016. ISBN 978-88-541-9472-4
- (in Italian) L'amore è una formula matematica, Rizzoli 2015. ISBN 978-88-586-8232-6
- (in Italian) Prime Catastrofiche Impressioni, Rizzoli 2014. ISBN 978-88-586-7150-4
- (in Italian) Cosa Farebbe Jane?, Rizzoli 2014. ISBN 978-88-586-7527-4.
- (in Italian) Il Bello della Diretta, Rizzoli 2014. ISBN 978-88-586-7820-6
- (in Italian) L'Enigma Botticelli, Melino Nerella 2013. ISBN 978-88-96311-15-8

=== Essays ===
- "È facile vivere bene a Roma se sai cosa fare", Newton Compton, 2016, ISBN 978-88-541-9537-0
- "Storia Pettegola d'Italia", Newton Compton, 2015, ISBN 978-8854181977
- "Storia Erotica d'Italia", Newton Compton, 2014, ISBN 978-8854171534
- Il Rinascimento Italiano nel fumetto in Narrare la storia dal documento al racconto, Mondadori, Milan, 2006 ISBN 88-04-56232-3
- Disegno letterario: Il fumetto come strumento educativo, SSEF, 2006
- Ragazze di pochi mezzi, SSEF, 2007
- Fumetto ed educazione, in Generazioni, Unisped, Roma, 2008
- La povertà nella letteratura in Generazioni, Unisped, Roma, 2009
- La donna in Fontane, Rivista di Studi Umanistici Leussein, Rome University Press, 2009
- La Profetessa di Sventure: rielaborazione del mito di Cassandra nella letteratura occidentale, Rivista di Studi Umanistici Leussein, Rome University Press, 2009
- Postfazione al romanzo "Il mio nome è Aqua Caliente" by Claudio De Luca, 2009
- Echi del Mito di Cassandra in Muriel Spark, Rivista di Studi Umanistici Leussein, Rome University Press, 2010
- Interpretazioni del mito di Pandora, Rivista di Studi Umanistici Leussein, Rome University Press, 2010
- Le sorelle Bronte nel manga giapponese, atti del convegno "Contaminazioni Creative", Università di Roma Tre, 2011
- I Narratori delle Tele, Rivista di Studi Umanistici Leussein, Rome University Press, 2012
- Orgoglio senza Pregiudizio. Le ragazze di Jane Austen, Edizioni Opposto, 2013
- Storia Erotica d'Italia, Newton Compton, 2014 ISBN 978-88-541-7153-4.

=== Plays ===
- Sotto il fiume, directed by Flavia Ricci, 2007.
- S. Holmes e il mistero della Mummia., directed by Anna Masullo, 2011.
- Il raduno dei pirati e il terrificante mistero del vascello fantasma, directed by Anna Masullo, 2012.
