= LA7d =

Italian television channel

- Final logo used from 29 April 2024
- Country: Italy
- Broadcast area: Italy

Programming
- Language: Italian
- Picture format: HDTV 1080i

Ownership
- Owner: Cairo Communication
- Sister channels: La7

History
- Launched: 22 March 2010; 16 years ago
- Replaced: LA7 Sport
- Closed: 1 October 2025; 10 months ago
- Replaced by: LA7 Cinema

Links
- Website: https://www.la7.it/la7d

Availability

Terrestrial
- Digital terrestrial television: Channel 29

LA7d was an Italian free-to-air television channel owned by Cairo Communication.

The channel's programming was aimed at a female audience. The "d" contained in the name means "donna" (woman).

The channel's advertising was granted by Cairo Pubblicità.

== History ==
The channel launched on 22 March 2010 with the film Don't Think About It and the theatrical show Il Milione - Quaderno Veneziano by Marco Paolini. Preceding the official launch was a video loop, still broadcast today during the night hours, set on board a train accompanied by the channel's official launch date, various names contained in the "d" in the logo and various famous quotes such as The only true voyage of discovery . . . would be not to visit strange lands, but to possess other eyes by Marcel Proust.

From 4 March 2013, together with sister channel La7, the channel moves to Cairo Communation.

On 15 July 2015, the channel was activated on Tivùsat and from 30 July on channel 34.

Logo used from 22 March 2010, to 29 April 2024

On 29 September 2015, the HD broadcast starts in terrestrial mode on channel 529 carried by the Cairo Due mux in conflict with the numbering of its SD counterpart present in the TIMB 3 mux.

On 14 January 2016, following a reorganization of the Tivùsat numbering, the channel moves on channel 29.

From 18 July 2016, the SD channel is carried by the Cairo Due mux.

On 1 January 2017, the channel ends broadcast on the TIMB 3 mux.

On 3 January 2018, the HD version gets replaced by an SD copy until 3 April 2018.

On 28 December 2020, the channel's satellite version moves to MPEG-4 encoding and can therefore be only received by high-definition-enabled devices.

On 5 July 2021, the HD version gets removed from digital terrestrial television.

On 25 March 2022, the HD version gets removed from digital terrestrial television.

On 19 September 2022, the channel arrives on Sky, in HD, on channel 161.

On 29 April 2024, the channel has changed logo, graphics and programming, enriched with more than 1500 hours of television content, including all seasons of Desperate Housewives (now moved to the national 7 Gold circuit with only airing the pilot episode and later seasons' select episodes, as it had previously aired on Fox Life, Rai 2, Rai 4 and Mya).

On 10 September 2025, the channel's closure was announced after 15 years, as it will be replaced by LA7 Cinema on 1 October. However, because of this, select programming are either moved or no longer aired elsewhere. The channel would later cease broadcasting on 1 October of the said year and has been replaced by LA7 Cinema.

== Programming ==
The channel's programming included a rebroadcast of part of La7's current and former programming, in the full style of a catch-up TV, along with programs aimed at female audiences.

Between late 2010 and early 2011, exclusive productions for the channel began. Alessandro Borghese and subsequently Simone Rugiati host from Mondays to Fridays Cuochi e fiamme. Alba Parietti, with Francesca Reggiani, hosts since 3 February 2011 the Alballoscuro talk show. Since 5 February 2011, Federica Ramacci hosts the Madama palazzo political talk show. Since 24 February 2011, Francesca Senette hosts Effetti personali. Michela Rocco di Torrepadula, hosts since 14 May 2011 Storie di grandi chef.

=== Current Programming ===
- Agatha Christie's Marple
- Bull
- Cougar Town
- Dharma & Greg
- How I Met Your Mother
- Josephine, Guardian Angel
- Modern Family
- Revenge
- This Is Us

=== Former programming ===
- Ally McBeal
- Army Wives
- A cena da me
- Alballoscuro
- Amar en tiempos revueltos
- Any Day Now
- Arrivederci amore ciao
- Beauty and the Beast
- The Big C
- Boston Legal
- Brothers & Sisters
- Buccia di banana
- Cambio cuoco
- Cercasi principe disperatamente
- Chef per un giorno
- Chicago Hope
- Chi sceglie la seconda casa
- Cold Squad
- Cuochi e fiamme
- Desperate Housewives
- Devious Maids
- Donne, vittime e carnefici
- Don't Tell the Bride (Italy)
- Dirt
- The Dr. Oz Show
- Effetti personali
- Fast Forward
- Father Brown
- Fuori di gusto
- Giardinieri in affitto
- Grey's Anatomy
- Halifax f.p.
- Hart to Hart
- How to Get Away with Murder
- Hustle
- I menù di Benedetta
- Indovina cosa sceglie la sposa
- The L Word
- La Mala EducaXXXion
- Leverage
- Madama Palazzo
- Mamma mia... che settimana
- Miss Italia
- Mistresses
- Mr. Green
- Murder Call
- New Tricks
- Notturno femminile
- The Oprah Winfrey Show
- Outrageous Fortune
- Para vestir santos
- Parla con lui
- The People v. O. J. Simpson: American Crime Story
- Pretty Tough
- Private Practice
- The Resident
- Rugrats
- Scandal
- Sex and the City
- Simon's Cat
- The Strip
- Strong Medicine
- TG La7
- Ugly Betty
- Touched by an Angel
- Venga a prendere uno show da noi
- Victor Victoria - Niente è come sembra
- Web Therapy
- White Collar
- Wild Card
- The Wild Thornberrys
