= Diego Bianchi =

Diego Bianchi may refer to:

- Diego Bianchi (artist) (born 1969), Argentinian artist
- Diego Bianchi (journalist) (born 1969), Italian journalist and television presenter
