= Propaganda Live =

- Genre: Entertainment, journalism
- Created by: Makkox
- Directed by: Igor Skofic
- Presented by: Diego Bianchi
- Country of origin: Italy
- Original language: Italian
- No. of seasons: 10
- No. of episodes: 329

Production
- Running time: 210 minutes

Original release
- Network: LA7
- Release: 29 September 2017 – present

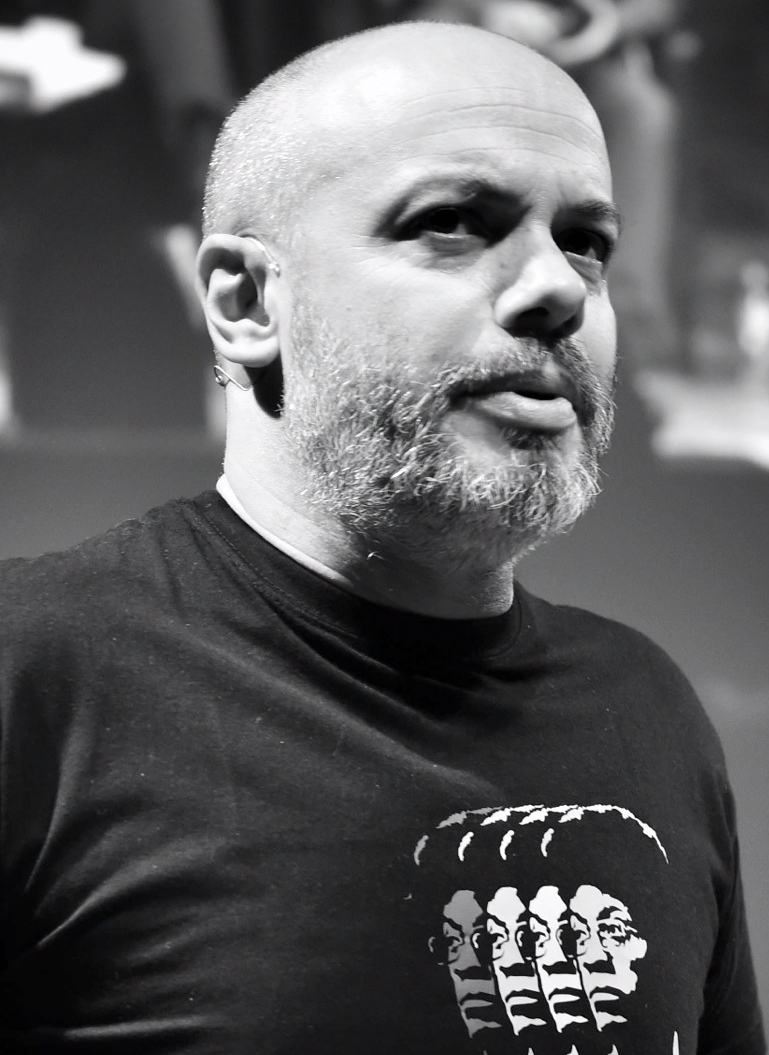
Diego "Zoro" Bianchi

Propaganda Live is an Italian television talk show, broadcast on LA7 since 2017 and hosted by Diego "Zoro" Bianchi.

== Format and production history ==
The show runs every Friday night for approximately 3 hours of live broadcast, and features a live audience and in-studio guests who are interviewed on stage by the host, and the contribution of regular guest journalists in each episode. The set and show design is inspired by a ship, with the stage made to appear like a deck, and craters placed around it. The show focuses on reports on the main social and political events of the day, made by Zoro himself, with commentary in the studio. Marco "Makkox" Dambrosio, the creator of the program, is his main interlocutor. The regular cast is completed by a live band consisting of guitarist and singer-songwriter Roberto Angelini and other musicians on various instruments.

The program has as regular guests the journalist from La Stampa Francesca Schianchi and the journalist from TG LA7 Paolo Celata. In the first five seasons the journalist and former director of L'Espresso Marco Damilano appeared as a regular guest. Constanze Reuscher, correspondent in Italy of the German newspaper Die Welt, has also been a frequent guest in the program. From the fifteenth episode singer-songwriter and television personality Memo Remigi has also become a regular guest.

On 5 February 2019, during the Sanremo Music Festival, the show's drummer Fabio Rondanini wore a t-shirt with the Propaganda Live logo during Daniele Silvestri's performance. This was repeated on 8 February during his drumming with the band Calibro 35 who accompanied Ghemon and Diodato's performance. For the first two seasons, the Roman taxi driver Mirko "Missouri 4" Matteucci was also a regular guest, who often conducted witty polls together with Leonardo Parata. The show also features regular monologue segments, where Italian celebrities, journalists, and other notable people give their views about various social, political and cultural topics. Actress Antonella Attili has been one of the frequent monologue guests. On 31 December 2020, a special 4-hour episode aired on the occasion of the New Year's Eve party. For the occasion, the ordinary format was enriched with many guests and the drawing of a tombola with prizes.

== The letter from President Mattarella ==
On the occasion of the last episode of the first season in June 2018, after initially responding negatively to an interview request from the host, the president of the Italian Republic Sergio Mattarella expressed his appreciation for the program in a letter:

Dear Diego Bianchi,

... I take this opportunity to express my appreciation for the broadcast, also for the way you followed, with a light-hearted but never banal look, the complicated phase of the consultations for the formation of the government. When I was able to see you, unfortunately not often, I really enjoyed it. I send you and all your collaborators my best wishes for good work.

President Sergio Mattarella

The president also humorously referred to the catchphrase of Diego Bianchi noting how the door of the press room of the Quirinale had been broken for years, adding: "I will have the door of the press room repaired." At the beginning of the first episode of the second season, aired on 14 September 2018, the host shows a clip in which he meets the president, who, after the ritual greetings, confirms that the door has been repaired.

== Series overview ==
Series	Episodes	Originally released		
Series	Episodes	First released	Last released	Network
1	36	29 September 2017	15 June 2018	LA7
2	37	14 September 2018	14 June 2019	LA7
3	38	13 September 2019	12 June 2020	LA7
4	37	11 September 2020	4 June 2021	LA7
5	36	10 September 2021	17 June 2022	LA7
6	36	9 September 2022	16 June 2023	LA7
7	35	15 September 2023	14 June 2024	LA7
8	36	13 September 2024	13 June 2025	LA7
9	34	12 September 2025	12 June 2026	LA7
10	TBA	18 September 2026	TBA	LA7
