= Murder of Chiara Poggi =

Italian murder mystery

- Location: 45.194222°N 8.934806°E; 8 Via Giovanni Pascoli, Garlasco, Pavia, Italy
- Date: 13 August 2007; 09:12 – 09:35 approx.
- Injuries: Stabbing
- Victim: Chiara Poggi
- Perpetrator: Alberto Stasi
- Motive: Unknown

On 13 August 2007, 26-year-old Chiara Poggi was murdered in Garlasco, in the Province of Pavia, Italy. The crime had extensive media coverage in Italy, with a succession of news reports, television programmes and interviews dedicated to the case.

On 12 December 2015, the Supreme Court of Cassation definitively recognized the victim's boyfriend Alberto Stasi, then an economics student, as the only person guilty of the crime. Stasi was sentenced to 16 years of imprisonment, and his repeated requests for a review of the trial have been rejected. In January 2023, he entered a work release program. He continues to maintain his innocence.

In March 2025, the case was reopened by investigators after forensic analysis of previously untested DNA evidence. They found that the DNA found on/in the fingernails had the patrilineal sequence of another man, not that of the convicted Alberto Stasi. New investigations have Andrea Sempio under investigation for conspiracy with Alberto Stasi or unknown persons.

== Events ==
Chiara Poggi was born in Vigevano on 31 March 1981. Her parents were Giuseppe Poggi and Rita Preda. Alberto Stasi was born in Sesto San Giovanni on 6 July 1983.

On the morning of Monday, 13 August 2007, Chiara Poggi, an economics graduate, was fatally stabbed with a blunt object that was never identified or found. She was found in the villa where she lived with her family in Garlasco. According to investigators, she knew her attacker, having opened the door to her house in her pyjamas. The attack was thought to be spontaneous, given that no signs of forced entry were found inside the house. At the time of the crime, Poggi was alone in the house, as her parents and brother were on holiday.

Alberto Stasi reported Poggi's body to police. He was an economics student at Bocconi University in Milan and later an accountant. He had no criminal record. Poggi's body was found lying on the stairs leading to the cellar of the villa, lying on the ninth step in a pool of blood.

Suspicions immediately focused on Stasi because of the excessive cleanliness of his shoes, as if he had polished or changed them after walking on the blood-stained floor (which he should have gotten at least minimally dirty on while walking there in search of his girlfriend), the absence of blood on his clothes (as if they had been changed) and some inconsistencies in his story. Stasi was arrested on 24 September 2007, with an order from the Vigevano prosecutor's office, but released four days later by the investigating judge Giulia Pravon due to insufficient evidence.

== Investigation ==
=== Time of the crime ===
According to the alibi provided from the start, Stasi was working on the computer on the morning of the crime, writing his thesis. The computer was handed over to the Carabinieri agents the following day. However, some inappropriate operations by the investigators would have altered and cancelled the access to the computer's storage memory. Only thanks to a much more in-depth computer expertise was it ascertained that Stasi used it from 9:35 to 12:20. This did not, however, clarify what happened in a 23-minute time window, from 9:12, the time at which it is known that Chiara Poggi definitely deactivated the burglar alarm in the villa, the last proof of her being alive, until 9:35, the time at which Stasi was certainly in front of his computer.

=== Stasi's shoes ===
Stasi's shoes, the ones he was wearing when he entered the villa, would have walked along the blood-stained corridors until the discovery of the body. They were analyzed by a forensic expert in 2007 and did not appear to contain even the slightest trace of blood. According to the RIS expert report in 2014, they should have "captured blood particles", at least minimally, so they could not have been completely clean. The same is said about the car mat he would have used to go to the villa and leave after the discovery of the crime. According to the prosecution's hypothesis, Stasi would not have actually entered the villa to discover the crime, a crime he already knew about because he would have been the one to commit it. The defence instead argued that Stasi walked around the villa avoiding the pools of blood and that, due to the time that had passed since the crime, the smaller splashes of blood that covered the entire floor were already dry (at the time it was argued that any small residues would have cleaned up upon contact with the wet grass in the garden). In fact, particles of the victim's DNA were found already in 2007 on the carpet of the car he used, but there was uncertainty as to whether they were blood and they were discarded by the GUP. According to the new analyses, however, at least the traces on the carpet are blood.

=== Bicycles ===
Two witnesses (Bermani and Travain) considered reliable noticed that morning, around 9:10, a black women's bicycle leaning against the perimeter wall of the Poggi villa, which was immediately linked to Chiara's murderer. Stasi instead owned a burgundy men's bicycle of the "Umberto Dei" brand, which was immediately seized. On the pedals of this bicycle, biological traces of Chiara Poggi were found, although not blood. Stasi also had at his disposal a black family bicycle for women of the "Luxury" brand, which was examined by the Carabinieri Marshal Francesco Marchetto but not seized, because it was considered incompatible with the description of a witness, who described it as having a black luggage rack.

An expert report conducted 7 years later by the civil party, lawyer Tizzoni, ascertained that the Stasi family's black women's bicycle was equipped with "Union" pedals, which were also fitted as standard on Stasi's personal burgundy men's "Umberto Dei" bicycle. On the other hand, this bicycle, seized at the time of the investigation, was equipped with non-original Wellgo pedals, on which traces of the victim's DNA were found. It is therefore assumed that there may have been an exchange of pedals between the two bicycles of the Stasi family. According to this reconstruction, Stasi, having learned that some witnesses had noticed a black bicycle outside the villa, in the week following the crime exchanged the pedals of the black bicycle, dirty with biological traces of Chiara Poggi, with those of his burgundy bicycle, with the aim of confusing the evidence.

At the second appeal trial in 2014, however, it was the prosecution's representative, the deputy attorney general of Milan Laura Barbaini, who maintained that "It is mathematically excluded that there was an exchange between the pedals" of the two bicycles available to Alberto Stasi. She excluded the exchange of pedals on the basis of a consultancy "on the manufacturing date of the various components and on any modifications" entrusted to experts during the investigative activities carried out in the context of the second appeal trial. In the request in which she asked the judges of the Court of Assizes of Appeal to carry out further investigative activities, Barbaini explained that the seized black bicycle "is consistent in all its components which have congruent manufacturing dates". In reality - the magistrate clarified - no exchange of pedals ever occurred between Stasi's burgundy "Umberto Dei" and the seized black women's bicycle.

=== Genetic material under the victim's fingernails and hair ===
At the crime scene, a light brown hair was found, which turned out to be devoid of a bulb and therefore of DNA. Under the victim's nails there were organic residues that contained male markers compatible, but not attributable with certainty, to the accused: according to leaks to the media, they also corresponded with at least two unknown male profiles and were not identifiable or comparable due to the deterioration of the material.

=== Alleged scratch on Stasi ===
There is also a photograph of Stasi with a presumed scratch on his arm, which however is not probative because it is grainy. The first investigators who questioned Stasi did not detect any scratch at the time, nor was it recorded in any preliminary document.

== Processes ==
The only person ever under investigation for the murder was the victim's boyfriend, Alberto Stasi, who was acquitted of the charges with an abbreviated trial, both in the first and second degree, while the Court of Cassation, on 18 April 2013, overturned the acquittal.

According to lawyers, Alberto Stasi could not have stained himself since the blood was already dry; the forensic medical report indicated a time of death consistent with this hypothesis and the computer one gave an alibi to the young man, who was working on the computer to prepare his thesis. According to the defence, the crime, after having suggested investigating the family and work environment, could be attributed to a violent robbery, in which the thief had initially tricked the victim into opening the door. This hypothesis was also rejected by the acquittal sentences.

In the first instance on 17 December 2009 at the Court of Vigevano, the GUP Stefano Vitelli, acting as sole judge, acquitted Alberto Stasi for not having committed the crime.

On appeal on 7 December 2011, before the Court of Assizes of Appeal with lay judges and with the trial moved to Milan, a new expert report (not accepted by the judging panel, however) moved the time of death, thus denying Stasi an alibi and the plausibility of the fact that he had no involvement, without however leading to a conviction. The sentence was one of acquittal "for not having committed the crime".

The Court of Cassation, among the reasons for the annulment, ordered DNA tests on the hair found in the victim's hands (not known during the first trial) and on DNA residues under the nails, collected and never analysed. Despite the annulment with postponement of the acquittal, the Supreme Court reiterated that it was, in its opinion, difficult "to reach a result, of acquittal or conviction, marked by coherence, credibility and reasonableness" and therefore "impossible to condemn or acquit Alberto Stasi", preferring however not to confirm the acquittal, pending new scientific tests.

At the appeal trial adjourned on 17 December 2014, following the new computerised assessment of his gait and some inconsistencies in his story and despite the lack of evidence in the new DNA tests (such as the one on his hair), Stasi was found guilty and sentenced to twenty-four years in prison (a sentence later reduced to 16 years thanks to the abbreviated trial) for voluntary homicide, with the exclusion, however, of the aggravating circumstances of cruelty and premeditation. Subsequently filing an appeal with the Supreme Court, the PM requested confirmation of the sentence and the addition of the aggravating circumstance of cruelty (to increase the sentence), while the defence (composed of lawyers Angelo and Fabio Giarda and Giuseppe Colli) requested annulment without adjournment or a new trial, referring to the doubts previously expressed by the Supreme Court itself on the impossibility of determining guilt or innocence with certainty.

The prosecutor of the Supreme Court of Cassation surprisingly requested the annulment of the sentence, with a preference for referral. On 12 December 2015, however, the Court of Cassation confirmed the second sentence of the Court of Appeal of Milan, definitively sentencing Alberto Stasi to 16 years of imprisonment, although without outlining a motive, speaking of an attack of rage by Stasi.

=== Motivation ===
In particular, Alberto Stasi's guilt lies in:

1. In the fact that Chiara Poggi was killed by a known person, who arrived alone on a bicycle, whom she herself let into the house. Whoever entered the house knew the place well, as can also be deduced from the route taken inside the rooms on the ground floor;
2. In the fact that Alberto Stasi, the victim's boyfriend, who was on familiar terms with her, knew her home and her habits and owned more than one women's bicycle, compatible with the "macrodescription" given by the witnesses Bermani and Travain, provided an alibi that was not sufficient to exclude his presence at the crime scene in the "time window" compatible with the commission of the murder;
3. In the fact that Alberto Stasi gave an incongruous, illogical and false account of the discovery of his girlfriend's lifeless body, claiming to have run through the various rooms of the villa to look for Chiara; however, no trace of blood residue was found on his shoes, nor were the blood stains on the floor altered by his passage;
4. In the fact that the murderer was a man who wore size 42 shoes and Alberto Stasi also owned and wore shoes of the same brand as the attacker, and also in size 42.

These multiple elements, of evidentiary value and evaluated globally, were considered to converge towards the defendant's responsibility for the murder of his girlfriend. Each clue, according to the Supreme Court, appears to integrate perfectly with the others, like pieces of a mosaic that contributed to creating an overall picture convergent towards the guilt of Alberto Stasi, beyond any reasonable doubt.

=== Request for procedural review ===
In 2016, Alberto Stasi's lawyers appealed to the European Court of Human Rights to obtain a review of the trial.

On 19 December 2016, the defense presented a genetic report indicating that the DNA found under Chiara Poggi's fingernails belonged to an acquaintance of the victim and not to Stasi. On 22 December, the Pavia prosecutor's office opened a new investigation concerning a friend of Marco Poggi, Chiara's younger brother, namely Andrea Sempio, who used to travel by bicycle in Garlasco and had a shoe size similar to Stasi's, as well as a not entirely solid alibi. The following day, the Attorney General of Milan, Roberto Alfonso, accepted the request for a review of the trial, deemed "founded", and forwarded it to the competent Court of Appeal of Brescia.

The Court of Appeal of Brescia declared itself incompetent in 2017 due to procedural defects (Stasi's lawyers did not submit an explicit request). The lawyers then resubmitted the application, also attaching testimonial evidence. The investigation into Andrea Sempio was instead archived on 2 March 2017. Sempio then sued Stasi's lawyers for slander. In May 2017, Stasi instead filed an extraordinary appeal to the Supreme Court for procedural defects (witnesses and evidence from the first and second instance were not recalled in the appeal although they were not delegitimized in the annulment, which only requested some new investigations: that is, the woman who saw the bicycle without recognizing it, the IT experts and the first instance forensic medical experts) and therefore violation of the right to a fair trial, requesting the revocation of the conviction, the raising of the question of constitutional legitimacy and a new appeal trial.

On 19 March 2021, the first criminal section of the Supreme Court of Cassation rejected the request for a review of the murder conviction, as "the evidentiary value of numerous other serious elements" against Stasi remained.

On 12 December 2023, the European Court of Human Rights rejected the request for a review of the murder conviction, declaring the appeal presented by Stasi's lawyers "inadmissible". On 7 February 2025, the same European Court rejected the request for a second time for a review, also declaring it "inadmissible".

=== New developments ===
On 11 March 2025, a new notice of investigation was served on Andrea Sempio, a friend of Chiara Poggi's brother, for conspiracy to commit murder. The man had already been investigated due to the discovery of his alleged DNA, but the charges against him had been shelved.

According to the latest press reports, "the Pavia prosecutor's office is proceeding against Sempio, led by prosecutor Fabio Napoleone and deputy prosecutor Stefano Civardi, who has delegated the Carabinieri of the Milan Investigative Unit. The DNA sample is always at the centre of the investigations, which - as supported by important new tests carried out in laboratories - would be perfectly usable for legal purposes. The Pavia prosecutors, after having certified that the DNA was usable, carried out some investigations, arriving at the name of Sempio and therefore at the request to reopen the previously archived case, a necessary step to investigate the same person for the second time for the same crime. However, the preliminary investigations judge of the Pavia court initially rejected the request, which was instead accepted in the following months after the prosecutors' appeal to the Supreme Court. In December, the ermines recognised the correctness of the Pavia prosecutor's hypothesis and in fact ordered the reopening of the case and the start of new investigations on Sempio".

== Related procedures ==
Alberto Stasi was sentenced to pay one million euros in civil compensation to the Poggi family. After having worked as a switchboard operator at the Bollate prison and having renounced his father's inheritance, resulting in his being penniless, in 2018 Stasi reached an agreement with the Poggi family for compensation of 700,000 euros, half of which has already been paid, and from 2023 he will leave the penitentiary institute during the day to work as an accountant.

Stasi was also charged with possession of child pornography and, as a possible motive for the crime, the prosecution in the first and second degree murder trial indicated the fact that Chiara could have discovered it. He was initially sentenced in the first degree and on appeal, in a separate trial, to a sentence of 30 days in prison later converted into a fine of 2,540 euros plus a lifelong ban on working in contact with minors; he was instead acquitted with annulment without referral by the Court of Cassation in 2014, due to the non-existence of the fact as the alleged visual files were only "traces", never downloaded, partially recovered by the scientific police but never visible to the accused. Only legal pornographic material was found on the computer, which Stasi admitted to possessing and viewing periodically, even in the company of his girlfriend who was later murdered.

In 2015, former Carabinieri Marshal Francesco Marchetto was instead charged with false testimony because he lied about the black women's bicycle seen at the crime scene, saying that it did not resemble the one owned by the Stasi family. On 23 September 2016, the sole judge of the Pavia Court Daniela Garlaschelli sentenced Marchetto for false testimony to two and a half years of imprisonment and a provisional sum of 10,000 euros to be paid to Chiara Poggi's family. In 2017, the Court of Appeal declared the statute of limitations for the crime and the end of the proceedings.

On 15 November 2017, proceedings for defamation and threats against Alberto Stasi were opened against the administrator of a Facebook page, who had written insults and stalked Stasi by following him to a parking lot when he was still free. Stasi's lawyers asked for 40,000 euros in compensation and refused a plea bargain for 15,000 euros. The woman, a self-styled medium, compensated Stasi out of court for 6,000 euros and was sentenced for defamation in civil proceedings to compensate him for 9,000 euros, for a total of 15,000 euros, as well as to pay a fine of 800 euros and to pay the legal costs for the sole crime of aggravated defamation, while not considering the accusation of threats to be well-founded.

== In popular culture ==
=== Television ===
- Matrix, Alessio Vinci, Canale 5
- Porta a Porta, Bruno Vespa, Rai 1
- Chi l'ha visto?, Federica Sciarelli, Rai 3
- Quarto grado, Gianluigi Nuzzi and Alessandra Viero, Rete 4
- Mistero, Daniele Bossari, Marco Berry, Jane Alexander, Lucilla Agosti, Andrea G. Pinketts and Nicole Pelizzari, Italia 1
- Le Iene
- Tutta la verità, Nove
- Delitti: Speciale Garlasco,
- Crimini Italiani: Il delitto di Garlasco, Pino Rinaldi, Nove

=== Podcast ===
- Investigations: Garlasco, 13 August 2007 (2022), podcast in two episodes edited by Stefano Nazzi for the Post.

=== Influence in mass culture ===
- Alberto Stasi is mentioned in the single Killer Star by Immanuel Casto.
- Alberto Stasi is also mentioned by the Italian rapper Fabri Fibra in the song of the same name from his album Controcultura.
- According to the noir writer Massimo Carlotto, this case of media trial negatively marked the culmination and the turning point of what he called "criminal attractions in the consensus factory", which would distract the average viewer from the major mafia-style crimes and would contribute to diminishing the Garantismo and the rule of law.

== See also ==
- Trial by media

== Bibliography ==
- Gian Luigi Tizzoni (2018). Processo Garlasco: diritto alla verità (Collezione P.Q.M. collana di psicologia giuridica n.3 ed.). Pisa: Edizioni ETS. ISBN 978-88-467-5046-4.
- Francesco Caringella (2019). L'estate di Garlasco. La ricostruzione del delitto che ha sconvolto l'Italia (Collana Strade blu ed.). Milano: Mondadori. ISBN 978-88-047-2027-0.
- Gabriella Ambrosio, Il garbuglio di Garlasco. Un perfetto colpevole e l'ostinata ricerca della verità, Soveria Mannelli, Rubbettino, 2022, ISBN 9788849870985.
