= Gad Lerner =

Italian journalist, writer and broadcaster

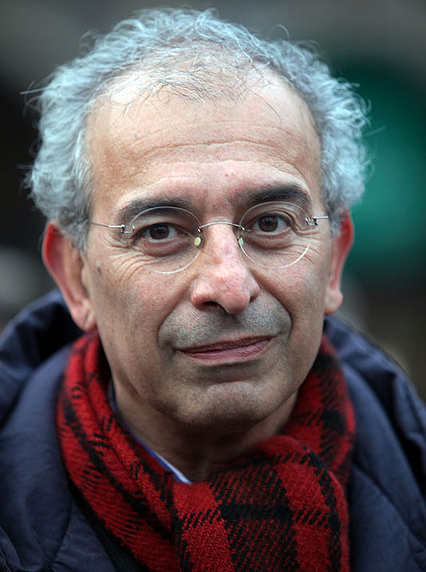
- Gad Lerner in 2010
- Born: 7 December 1954 (age 71); Beirut, Lebanon
- Occupations: Journalist, writer and tv presenter

Gad Eitan Lerner (Hebrew: גד איתן לרנר; born 7 December 1954) is an Italian journalist, writer and TV presenter.

== Early life ==
Lerner was born in Beirut in 1954. His father Moshe was the son of Jewish Ashkenazi parents who hailed from the Galician village of Drohobych, once part of the Austro-Hungarian Empire but now located in Ukraine. Moshe had been born in a Haifa kibbutz in Mandatory Palestine. His mother, Revital Taragan, was born in Tel Aviv, the daughter of Joseph Taragan, a wealthy Turkish Sephardic merchant and his wife Zipora, whose parents were Lithuanian intellectuals who adhered to the Hovevei Zion movement. Joseph and Zipora Taragan moved from British-ruled Palestine to French-ruled Lebanon and Revital grew up in Beirut. Moshe Lerner moved to Beirut when he married Revital Taragan. In 1957, Lerner's family emigrated to Italy where they took up residence in Milan.

== Career ==
In 2000, Lerner served as director of news broadcasts TG1 for Rai 1 but resigned after a selection of pornographic footage was mistakenly aired on prime time during his news broadcast on TG1. Along with his resignation, he revealed that a politician from National Alliance, Mario Landolfi, who also was the president of the parliamentary commission of vigilance regarding the public TV broadcasting service, asked him to favour an acquaintance of his in the TG1.

In 2001, Lerner participated in the foundation of a new Italian TV channel La7, where he was the first director of the news program TG La7 for a short time and after he hosted a weekly talk show L'Infedele until 2012. He left La7 in 2013 and has since curated and developed other TV programs, including the talk show Fischia il vento for La EFFE and a documentary series Operai for RAI 3.

In 2010, he was denied visa to Syria, even after his friend and journalist Alix Van Buren defended him: "He often defends the Muslim communities in Italy and their right to have mosques ... he is an independent Jew, who doesn't belong to any lobby ..., he signed a petition written by a group of European Jews which opposes some of the politics of Israeli prime minister Benjamin Netanyahu."

In 2007, Lerner was one of the founding members of the Democratic Party (PD) in Italy. In 2017, Lerner resigned from the PD in protest against the party's politics over immigration.

== Selected bibliography ==
- 2005: Tu sei un bastardo. Contro l'abuso delle identità (ISBN 978-8807840609).
- 2009: Scintille. Una storia di anime vagabonde (ISBN 978-8807171789).
- 2017: Concetta. Una storia operaia (ISBN 978-8807173349).
- 2024 Gaza:Odio e amore per Israele,Feltrinelli ISBN 978-8-807-17450-6

== Awards ==
In 2011, he received the prize "Archivio Disarmo - Golden Doves for Peace" awarded by IRIAD.

Media offices
Preceded by	Deputy editor in chief of La Stampa; 1993–1996	Succeeded by
Preceded by Giulio Borrelli	Editor in chief of TG1; 2000	Succeeded by Albino Longhi
New title	Host of Otto e mezzo 2001–2002	Succeeded by Luca Sofri
New title	Host of L'Infedele; 2002–2012	Succeeded by
