= Linea Gialla =

- Starring: Salvo Sottile
- Country of origin: Italy

Production
- Running time: 3 hours

Original release
- Network: La7
- Release: 2013

Linea Gialla is a talk and debate television program produced by La7 and aired in Italy. The program is entirely devoted to people disappeared under mysterious circumstances.

== Audience Share ==
Episode	Date	Audience	Share	Source
1	17 September 2013	467.000	02.35%	
2	24 September 2013	412.000	02.00%	
3	1 October 2013	628.000	02.65%	
4	8 October 2013	689.000	02.88%	
5	15 October 2013	572.000	02.73%	
6	22 October 2013	663.000	03.01%	
7	29 October 2013	609.000	02.94%	
8	5 November 2013	602.000	02.78%	
9	12 November 2013	571.000	02.79%	
10	19 November 2013	620.000	02.81%	
11	26 November 2013	577.000	02.55%	
12	3 December 2013	603.000	02.88%	
13	10 December 2013	669.000	03.28%	
14	17 December 2013	581.000	02.95%	
#	Media auditel	..	,%	#

Max Min

Episode	Date	Audience	Share	Source
15	21 January 2014	481.000	02.17%	
16	28 January 2014	722.000	03.34%	
17	4 February 2014	716.000	03.31%	
18	11 February 2014	514.000	02.36%	
19	25 February 2014	487.000	02.30%	
#	Media auditel	..	,%	#

Max Min
