= Makkox =

Italian cartoonist, illustrator and television creator (born 1965)

Marco Dambrosio (Makkox)
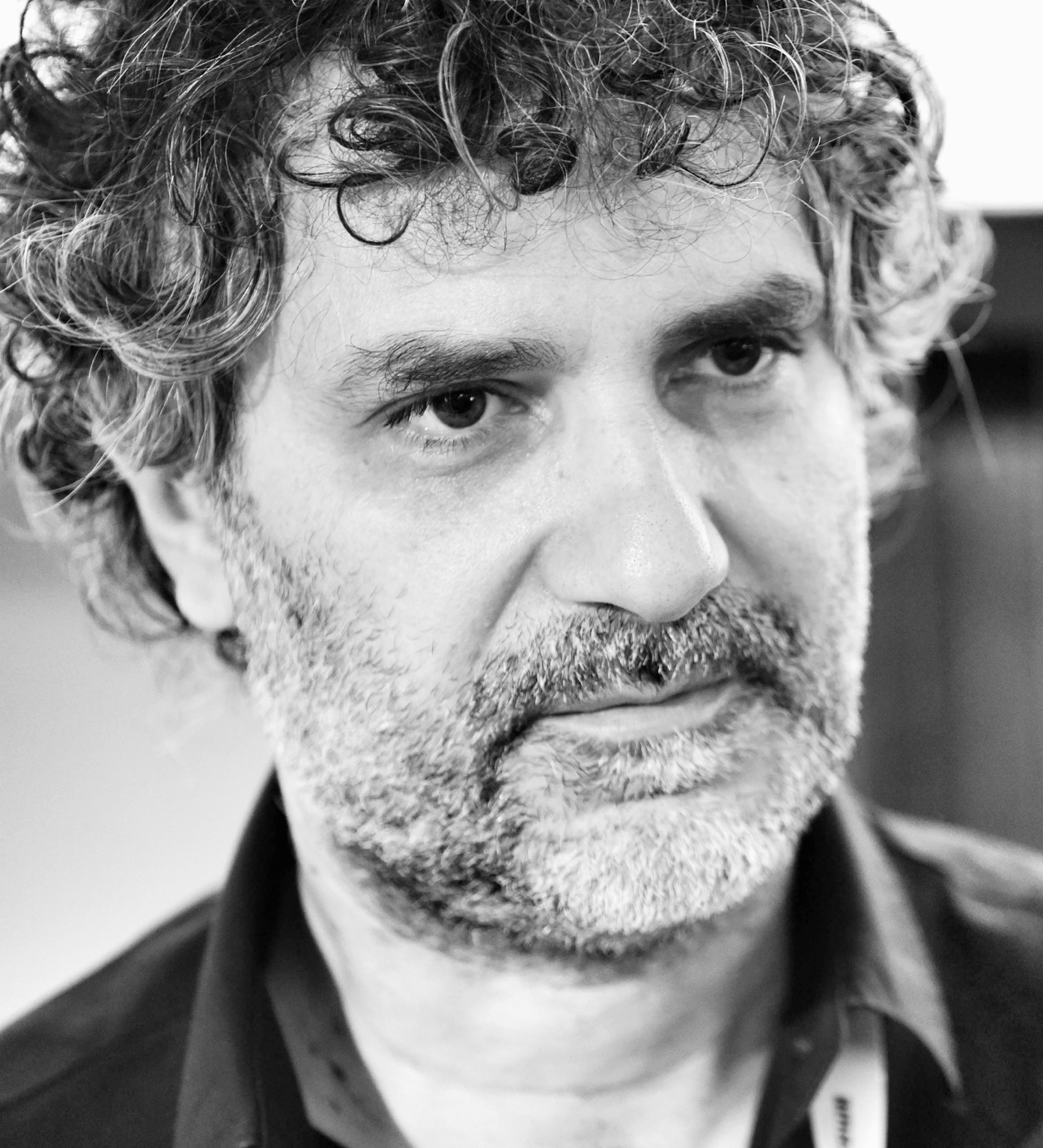
- Marco "Makkox" Dambrosio in 2014 at the International Journalism Festival in Perugia
- Born: 30 August 1965 (age 60); Formia, Italy
- Years active: 2007–present
- Known for: Propaganda Live

Makkox, pseudonym of Marco Dambrosio (born 30 August 1965) is an Italian satirist, cartoonist, illustrator and television creator.

== Career ==
Born in Formia but raised in Gaeta, Dambrosio was raised artistically by an aunt who was a professor of scenography. His passion for drawing began as a child with Donald Duck comics, which continues to inspire his work today. At 8 he would spend his days sketching and drawing still-life sets prepared for him by his aunt.

While working as a graphic designer for the retail industry, on 28 February 2007 he made his web debut with the blog Canemucca, adapting his strips vertically to fit the scrolling of internet pages. He soon achieved success and began to collaborate with the daily newspaper Liberazione, with the weekly information magazine Internazionale and with publisher Coniglio Editore, appearing in their comic magazines Blue and Animals and publishing his first comic book with them in 2009: Le [di]visioni imperfette (The imperfect divisions).

Since May 2010 he has published a monthly magazine, Il Canemucco, with Coniglio Editore. Initially six issues were planned, but publication was definitively interrupted after the release of issue four. A collection of the best cartoons were printed in October 2011 by BAO Publishing with the title Post Coitum – Satire di un Tardo Impero (Post Coitum – Satires of a Late Empire). Also in 2011 two collections of stories from magazines by Makkox were published: Se muori siamo pari (If you die we're even) and Ladolescenza (Adolescence).

From 2013 to 2017 Dambrosio was a regular guest on the Rai 3 show Gazebo, of which he is also the creator. In September 2017 he created the LA7 show Propaganda Live, and is the main interlocutor of host Diego Bianchi.

He currently publishes cartoons with L'Espresso, Il Foglio and Il Post.

In 2020 he published his autobiography Nuove mappe del Paradiso (New maps of Paradise) with the publishing house People founded by Giuseppe Civati.

== TV shows ==
- Gazebo (2013–2017)
- Propaganda Live (2017–present)
