= Vittorio Pezzuto =

Italian journalist, writer and politician

Vittorio Pezzuto (born 16 August 1966 in Genoa) is an Italian journalist, writer and politician.

== Biography ==
Vittorio Pezzuto was born in Genoa to an Italian father (who died when he was 8 years old) and a French mother. He spent 10 years in Catholic scouting. He graduated in 1990 with a degree in political science from the University of Genoa and served as a regional councilor from 1990 to 1995 (Anti-Prohibitionist List) and as a municipal councilor from 1990 to 1993 and 1993–1995 for the Radical Party, of which he has been a member since 1983. During the 1994 European elections, he renounced his seat in favor of Gianfranco Dell'Alba.

In 1984, with his friend René Andreani, he founded the second network of Radio Reporter in Genoa, which featured the first foreign language programs for immigrants. The radio won the RAI competition open to all private radios after two years. Since October 1997, he has been the secretary of the Radical Information Association. From 1995 to 1996, he served as national secretary and coordinator of the Marco Pannella List-Club Pannella Reformers.

From 2006 to 2008, he was head of the press office of the parliamentary group Rosa nel Pugno during the Prodi II Cabinet. He was put on trial with Marco Pannella and others for an anti-prohibitionist demonstration but was acquitted. He has collaborated with Radio Radicale, Il Foglio, Il Riformista, Il Secolo XIX, Vanity Fair, Smoking, Il Tempo, Libero, and Ideazione. From 2008 to 2011, he was the spokesperson and consultant to the minister for public administration and innovation of the Berlusconi IV Cabinet Renato Brunetta. Pezzuto is also among the creators of the anti-idler satirical cartoons published on the Ministry's website. He wrote a biography of Enzo Tortora, Applause and Spit. The Two Lives of Enzo Tortora. This volume and Anna Tortora's book Secret Brother inspired the TV movie Il caso Enzo Tortora – Dove eravamo rimasti? broadcast on Rai 1. He later self-published the volume Marta Russo. The Only Thing Certain is That She Died, dedicated to the case of the Murder of Marta Russo.

== Works ==
- Applause and Spit. The Two Lives of Enzo Tortora, Milan, Sperling & Kupfer, 2008; new edition with additional material in 2016

== Film adapted from his works ==
- Il caso Enzo Tortora – Dove eravamo rimasti? (2012), TV movie, directed by Ricky Tognazzi, screenplay and subject freely adapted from Pezzuto's Applause and Spit and Anna Tortora's Secret Brother.
