= Urbano Cairo =

Italian businessman (born 1957)

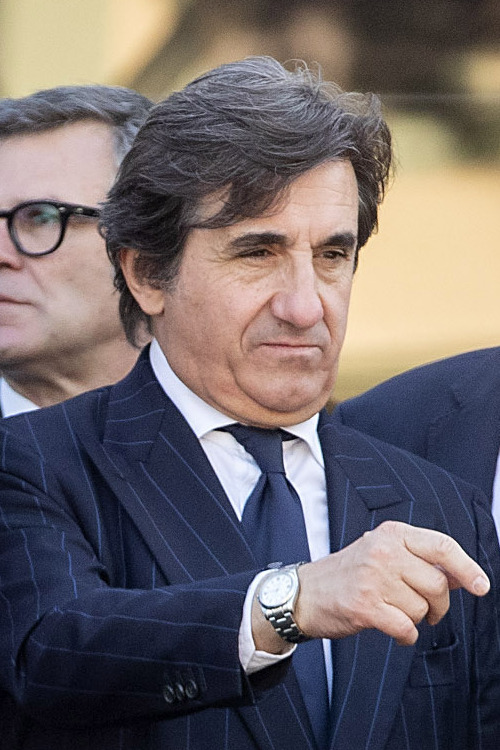
- Cairo in 2023

Personal information
- Date of birth: 21 May 1957 (age 69)
- Place of birth: Masio, Italy
- Position: Midfielder

Youth career
- Years: Team
- 1973 – 1975: Pro Sesto

Urbano Cairo (born 21 May 1957) is an Italian businessman and media proprietor.

== Biography ==
Cairo was born in Milan. His parents were originally from Masio, within the province of Alessandria. He is the first of four children born from the union between Giuseppe Cairo (1932-2022) and Maria Giulia Castelli (1933-2012).

In his teen years, he was a promising football player, and went on to play for Pro Sesto as a midfielder. Cairo graduated from Bocconi University in 1981 and was named alumnus of the year in 2019.

After working for a few years as personal assistant of Silvio Berlusconi at Fininvest, he founded his own company in 2000, Cairo Communication. Cairo, via U.T. Communications and UT Belgium Holding, owns 50.1% stake in Cairo Communication. He is also the owner of the majority share in RCS MediaGroup – a former Rizzoli company that publishes newspapers such as Corriere della Sera and Gazzetta dello Sport.

Since 2005, Cairo has been the owner and president of the Serie A club Torino. In 2017 he was awarded the title of Cavaliere del Lavoro for his achievements in business, development and job creation.

=== Fininvest ===
In 1981, while completing his military service and approaching graduation at the age of 24, Cairo heard a radio interview in which Milanese businessman Silvio Berlusconi invited young people with good ideas to approach him. After persistently contacting Berlusconi’s secretary, Cairo secured a meeting with him through Marcello Dell'Utri. The Fininvest founder takes him on trial as a personal assistant. From 1982 he worked permanently for his companies; in that year he was responsible for the acquisition of the TV station Italia 1 from Edilio Rusconi. Cairo stays at Berlusconi's side until the age of 28.

Cairo continued his career within Berlusconi’s companies, holding several managerial positions, including commercial director and deputy general manager of Publitalia '80, as well as managing director of Mondadori Pubblicità, the advertising division of the publishing house. According to his own statements, between 1991 and 1995, he increased the concessionaire’s revenue from 390 billion to nearly 500 billion lire, achieving a gain of eight percentage points in market share. In 1995 Fininvest dissolved the contract with Cairo who, since then, has continued his career on his own.

However, he was involved in the Mani pulite investigation: at the trial, unlike the other Fininvest executives, Cairo asked for a plea bargain and agreed to a 19-month suspended sentence for the crimes of embezzlement, invoices for non-existent transactions and false accounting. The sentence, which became final in 1999, was then reduced to five months until rehabilitation in 2004.

=== Cairo Communication ===
After leaving the Fininvest group, in 1995 he founded his own business, Cairo Pubblicità s.r.l. (today part of the Cairo Communication group). In January 1996, he obtained the exclusive concession for the advertising collection of three RCS magazines (at that time 46.28% controlled by the financial company of the Fiat group, Gemina) which were Io Donna, Oggi and TV Sette. In addition to the group's magazines, Cairo Pubblicità also has a concession for the monthly Prima Comunicazione.

A significant turning point in the growth of the group occurred in February 1999 with its first major financial operation, the acquisition of Editoriale Giorgio Mondadori S.p.A., a company founded by Giorgio Mondadori in 1980 and active in the book and magazine sector. The acquisition marks Cairo Group's entry into the publishing sector.

In 2000, Cairo Communication S.p.A. was listed on the Italian Stock Exchange, gathering resources to seize further growth opportunities through the development of existing activities and acquisitions or participations in companies operating in the communications sector. In 2003 he created his own publishing house, Cairo Editore S.p.A. It hired Sandro Mayer and the following year hired Silvana Giacobini, entrusting them with the direction of two new popular magazines namely Dipiù (2004) and Diva e Donna (2005). He initially set the sales price at 50 cents, broadening the readership base. He manages to bring the publishing house into profit.

As of 30 December 2015, it owned 72.8% of the capital of Cairo Communication, a share that fell to 50.2% after the acquisition of RCS in 2016.

=== LA7 ===
In 2013, the industrial group led by Urbano Cairo, Cairo Communication, showed interest in a commitment in the television sector, with a takeover bid for the LA7 television network owned by the Telecom Italia group. On 6 March 2013, Urbano Cairo officially acquired La7 by paying EUR 1 million to Telecom.
