= L'Infedele =

- Starring: Gad Lerner
- Country of origin: Italy
- Original language: Italian
- No. of episodes: N/A

Production
- Running time: 140 mins.

Original release
- Network: La7
- Release: 2002 – 2012

L'Infedele was an Italian television talk show hosted by the Italian journalist Gad Lerner and broadcast on La7 from 2002 to 2012.
