= Andrea Frediani =

Italian historian and novelist

Andrea Frediani (born 1963) is an Italian historian and novelist.

Born in Rome, he graduated in Letters with a dissertation on medieval history; after graduating he wrote for several youth magazines and, subsequently, for historical magazines. In 1997 Newton & Compton published his first book, entitled Gli assedi di Roma ("The Sieges of Rome"). His first novel, entitled 300 guerrieri and inspired by the Battle of Thermopylae, was released in 2007. In 2008 he published Jerusalem, a historical novel mixing the events of the First Crusade with the story of a fictional gospel by James, Jesus Christ's brother.

Frediani his also the author of a number of essays concerning the most famous battles in history, such as Le grandi battaglie di Roma antica ("The Greatest Battles of Ancient Rome"), Le grandi battaglie di Napoleone and others. His latest novel is Il tiranno di Roma (2013), following the previous year's La dinastia ("The Dynasty"), which narrated the secret history of Rome's Julio-Claudian Dynasty.
