= Il Post =

Italian news website

- Website type: Daily national online
- Available in: Italian
- Founded: 19 April 2010
- Founder: Luca Sofri
- Editor: Francesco Costa
- Website: ilpost.it

Il Post is an Italian news website, founded in 2010 by Luca Sofri. The editor in chief is Francesco Costa.

Initially backed mostly by sponsorships and revenue from advertising, the website is currently primarily supported by paid subscriptions.

== History ==
Launched on 19 April 2010, Il Post was conceived as an aggregator of the best content of the Italian and international press, selected and commented on by the editors, and supported by original content produced by the same editors and several collaborators, such as Debora Serracchiani, Andrea Romano, Ivan Scalfarotto, Giuseppe Civati, Flavia Perina, Antonio Dini. The lead also features the blogs of some illustrators and cartoonists, including Makkox who periodically publishes topical cartoons. In 2012 Il Post published the comic strips Peanuts and Doonesbury every day.

In 2011, Il Post won the third edition of the Premio Ischia Social Network for online information, presented during the Ischia International Journalism Awards.

== Financial restructuring ==
In May 2013, following a recapitalization to cover the losses of the company, respectively 360,000 euro in 2011 and 480,000 euro in 2012, the chair of the Board of Directors passed to Paul Ainio, CEO of Banzai SpA, which holds the majority of its stock. The news was made public on July 23 in Italia Oggi, a political and financial daily newspaper, in a short article which gave an account of the new allocation of the shares, as being: Banzai 30.53%, Kme different Inc. View and about 24% each, Giorgio Gori Sofri 8% and 10.9%. The next day Paul Ainio wrote to Italia Oggi, claiming the figures to be fictitious, outlining how after a successful reorganization Banzai and Sofri had increased their shares, to respectively to 24% and 22% respectively. The journalist Plazzotta, author of the article, has, in turn, responded that his report was the result of the reading of the notes to the 2012 budget of Il Post Srl, from which the data were taken, and that the control rates quoted in the article (Banzai ventures to 30.53% and Sofri 8%) are described in the Company Chamber certificate of 22 July 2013.
