= Airone =

Italian science magazine

- Categories: Science
- Frequency: Monthly
- Founded: 1981; 45 years ago
- Company: Cairo Communication
- Country: Italy
- Based in: Milan, Italy
- Language: Italian
- Website: Airone

Airone (English: Heron) is an Italian science magazine devoted to science and technology issues. It is published in Milan, Italy, by Editoriale Giorgio Mondadori (former company, now a division of Cairo Editore, a subsidiary of Cairo Communication).

== History and profile ==
Airone was founded in 1981 as an ecologist magazine primarily containing articles about animal world, nature, ethnology and geography. The founder and first director was Egidio Gavazzi. It was for years the most widely circulated scientific magazine in Italy, with a peak of average circulation of about 250,000 copies per month. Between 1985 and 1986 it co-produced with RAI the nature documentary series Pan. In 1989 it was launched a spin-off for the younger readers, Airone Junior, renamed Dodo in April 1995.

Airone was described as a "magazine similar to National Geographic, but perhaps more conservation-minded", and it was referred to as "a stunning natural history magazine, the best of several European magazines". In an article about the first ten years of the magazine, the L'Unità journalist Antonio Del Giudice pointed how the magazine was "not just an editorial phenomenon, but also a cultural, political e social phenomenon".

The circulation of Airone was 94,000 copies in 2007. In December 2013 the magazine had a circulation of 83,000 copies per month.

== See also ==
- List of magazines in Italy
