= Serena Dandini =

Italian television host and writer

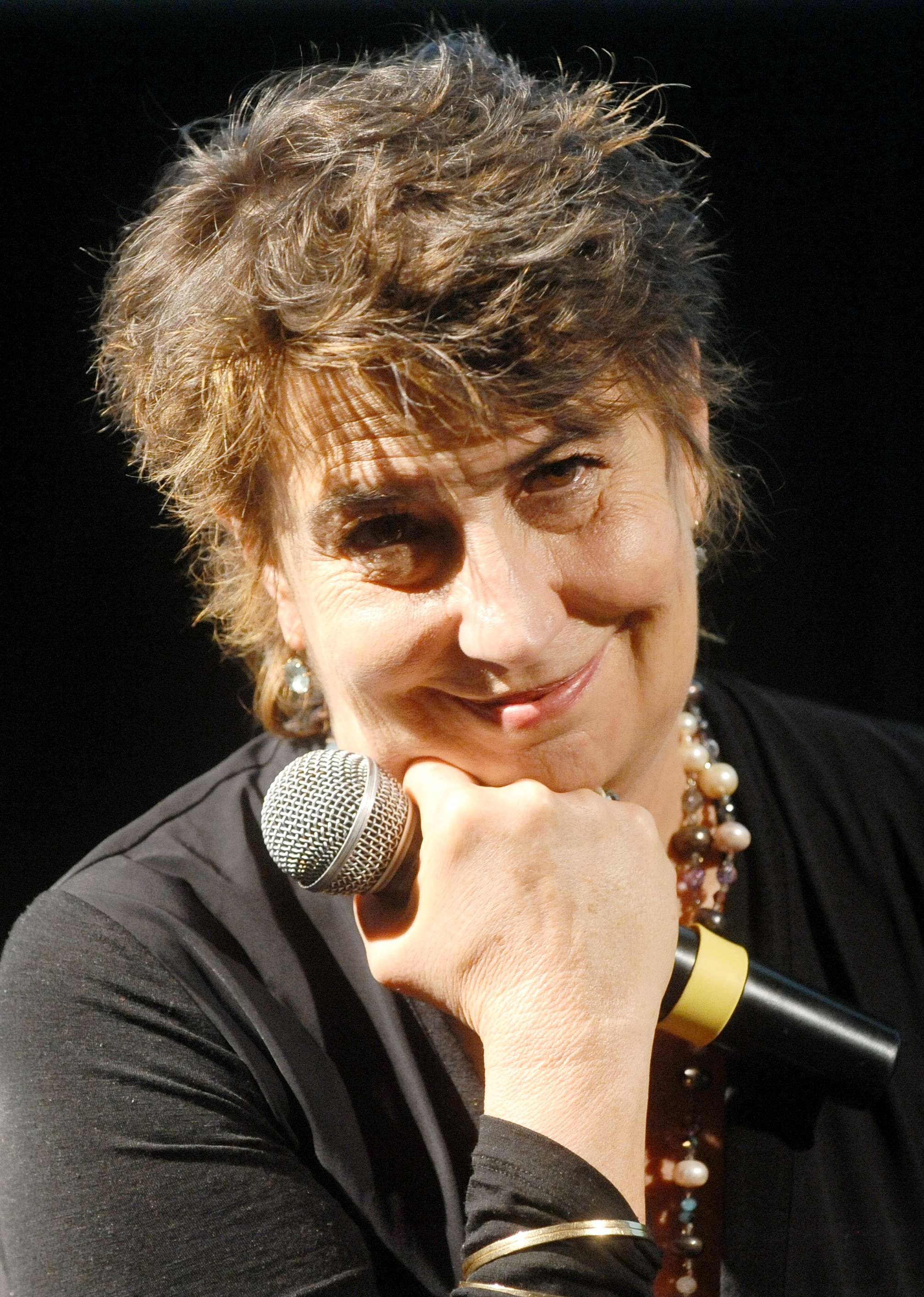
- Dandini in 2014
- Born: Rome, Italy

Serena Dandini (born 22 April 1954) is an Italian television presenter, writer and author.

== Career ==
Dandini was born and raised in Rome, the daughter of Count Francesco Lorenzo Dandini De Sylva, a lawyer and descendant of an ancient family of Roman nobility; and of the Marchioness Silvia Vaccari, sister of the founder of the Vaccari Institute. After studying at the Giulio Cesare classical high school she enrolled at the Sapienza University of Rome in the Anglo-American literature course, stopping three exams before her graduation to begin her career on the radio at the end of the seventies.

From the early 1980s, she collaborated with RAI on television and radio programs. She is the creator on Radio 2 of The Life of Mae West, where she worked with Laura Betti.

In 1995 she hosted the Sanremo Music Festival 1995, with Luciano De Crescenzo, Fabio Fazio and Gianni Ippoliti.

Beginning in 2001 she was artistic director of the Teatro Ambra Jovinelli in Rome. She was on the jury of the Sanremo Music Festival 2013.

From 2004 to 2011 she hosted her first talk show on Rai 3, Parla con me (Talk to me), conceived with the journalist Andrea Salerno, and including regular segments by among others presenter and journalist Diego Bianchi.

She was the host of The States General, a satire television show, which returned in 2019.

She is the author of Vieni avanti, cretina (Come on, you idiot!), and Sisters Don't Sleep, about gender-based violence.

== Personal life ==
Dandini has been married twice, and since 1993 she has been romantically linked to musician Lele Marchitelli. She has a daughter, Adele Tulli, born in 1982 (director of the documentary 365 without 377 on the battles of the LGBT movement in India for the abolition of section 377 of the Indian penal code).

Her sister Saveria Dandini de Sylva is President of the Leonarda Vaccari Institute. Her brother Ferdinando is an aeronautical engineer and currently a lecturer at Luiss Guido Carli and the University of Tor Vergata in Rome.

== Bibliography ==
- Lorenzo e la maturità. Come secernere agli esami, con Corrado Guzzanti, Milano, BUR senzafiltro, 2005, ISBN 88-17-00584-3.
- Amo, con Neri Marcorè, Milano, BUR senzafiltro, 2006, ISBN 88-17-00938-5.
- Parla con me. on Dvd, Milano, BUR, 2007, ISBN 978-88-17-01699-5.
- L'ottavo nano. on 5 Dvd (versione integrale del programma), Milano, BUR, 2009, ISBN 978-88-17-02379-5.
- Dai diamanti non-nasce niente. Storie di vita e di giardini, Milano, Rizzoli, 2011, ISBN 978-88-17-04867-5.
- Grazie per quella volta. Confessioni di una donna difettosa, Milano, Rizzoli, 2012, ISBN 978-88-17-05818-6.
- Ferite a morte, collaborazione ai testi e alle ricerche di Maura Misiti, Milano, Rizzoli, 2013, ISBN 978-88-17-06561-0.
- Il futuro di una volta, Milano, Rizzoli, 2015, ISBN 978-88-17-07268-7.
- Avremo sempre Parigi. Passeggiate sentimentali in disordine alfabetico, Milano, Rizzoli, 2016, ISBN 978-88-17-09020-9.
- Il catalogo delle donne valorose, Milano, Rizzoli, 2018, ISBN 978-88-0468-765-8.
- La vasca del Führer, Torino, Einaudi, 2020, ISBN 978-88-06-24282-4.
