= Cairo Communication =

Italian media and publishing company

Cairo Communication S.p.A.
- Company type: Società per azioni
- Traded as: BIT: CAI; FTSE Italia Small Cap
- ISIN: IT0004329733
- Founded: 1995 (as Cairo Pubblicità)
- Founder: Urbano Cairo
- Headquarters: Milan, Italy
- Key people: Urbano Cairo (chairman); Uberto Fornara (CEO)
- Net income: ▲€20 million (2016)
- Total assets: ▲€1.561 Million (2016)
- Total equity: ▲€344 million (2016)
- Owner: Urbano Cairo (50.101%); others
- Subsidiaries: Cairo Pubblicità; Cairo Publishing; Cairo Editore; RCS MediaGroup (59.693%); La7; others
- Website: cairocommunication.it
- Footnotes / references in a consolidated financial statement

Cairo Communication S.p.A. is an Italian media and publishing company based in Milan. The shares of the company float in Borsa Italiana. Urbano Cairo, via UT Communications, UT Belgium Holding, owned 50.101% stake of the company. In turn Cairo Communication owned 59.693% stake of fellow media company RCS MediaGroup, which was acquired in 2016.

== History ==
Urbano Cairo found a company Cairo Pubblicità in 1995, which wholesale advertisement space for RCS MediaGroup. In 1997 Cairo acquired a company which found in 1984, and renamed into Cairo Communication, as the holding company of his media empire. Cairo Communication acquired La7 in 2013 from Telecom Italia. In 2016 Cairo Communication acquired RCS MediaGroup by offering to buy the shares from the public market, which was more favor than the offer from the rival consortium.

== Publications and subsidiaries ==
- Cairo Editore
  - Editoriale Giorgio Mondadori
    - Airone
    - Edizioni Anabasi s.r.l.
  - Dipiù, a weekly family magazine
- RCS MediaGroup
- La7 S.p.A.
- Cairo Network s.r.l.
- Cairo Pubblicità S.p.A.
- Cairo Publishing S.r.l.
- Il Trovatore
