= Newton Compton Editori =

Italian publisher

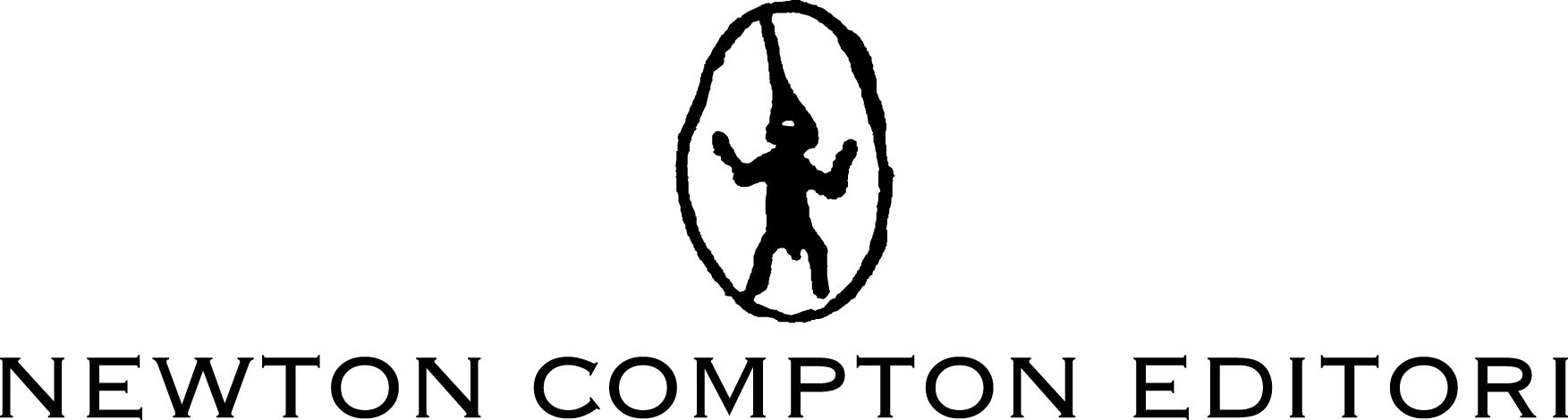
- Status: Active
- Founded: 1969; 57 years ago
- Founder: Vittorio Avanzini
- Country of origin: Italy
- Headquarters location: Rome
- Distribution: Italy
- Publication types: Paperback books in Italian
- Fiction genres: Romance, horror, science fiction, fantasy and historical novels
- Owner: GeMS Group
- Official website: www.newtoncompton.com

Newton Compton Editori, sometimes spelled Newton & Compton, is an Italian publisher of Italian language fiction books. In 2019, the publisher was acquired by GeMS Group.

== History ==
The publisher was founded in Rome by Vittorio Avanzini in 1969.

The house has published mostly paperbacks and low cost editions, including literature classics, essays and poetry. After devoting its activities mainly to reprints, starting from 2000s Newton Compton also publishes previously untranslated horror, science fiction, fantasy and historical novels by authors such as Simon Scarrow, Lisa J. Smith and Stuart MacBride. It has also published original works by Italian authors, including Andrea Frediani and Claudio Rendina.

In 2019, the company was acquired by the Italian publishing group, GeMS group and joined the group's 20 publishing houses retaining its brand name.
