= Diego Bianchi (artist) =

Argentinian visual artist (born 1969)

Diego Bianchi (born 1969 in Buenos Aires, Argentina) is an Argentinian visual artist. He lives and works in Buenos Aires, Argentina.

== Life and career ==
Diego Bianchi received his degree in graphic design from the University of Buenos Aires in 1992, after which he participated in a critique seminar run by Pablo Siquier between 2002 and 2003. Between 2003 and 2005, Bianchi also participated in a program for visual artists co-run by the Centro Cultural Ricardo Rojas and the University of Buenos Aires, funded by the Beca Kuitca scholarship. He subsequently received a scholarship to attend Skowhegan School of Painting and Sculpture (Maine, USA), from which he graduated in 2006.

Bianchi has accrued extensive teaching experience, leading numerous workshops around the world. These include a number of critique seminars at the Universidad Torcuato di Tella Buenos Aires (2013, 2015); an Antiproject workshop at the Universität der Künste Berlin in Dresden, Germany (2016); and an artist workshop at the Mandale Fruta Lugano in Buenos Aires (2017). He has received a number of awards, including the arteBA-Petrobras Award to the visual arts in 2007 and the Grant of Secretaría de Cultura de la Nación in 2006.

He is represented by the Galerie Jocelyn Wolff in Paris, France. He won the Konex Award from Argentina in 2022.

== Artistic Work ==
A prominent figure on the Latin American art scene, Diego Bianchi’s artistic work is made up of eclectic sculptures and installations, often utilizing elements of performance, which address both aesthetic standards and socio-political subjects. His pieces are constructed with visually transgressive materials that range from discarded objects such as chairs, pipes or electronics, to colorful casts of various body-parts, seemingly put together in a haphazard manner to create curious constructions that fill up the exhibition space. While the choice of material remains relatively open, Bianchi often works with smooth surfaces, placing and attaching them in various constellations. The discarded elements – which could be considered as trash – are transferred by the artist into a new context through their placement in a different artistic ecosystem, aesthetically working to "desanctify the work of art" through their constant reconstructions.

This approach is most visible in Bianchi’s recent exhibition at the Buenos Aires Museum of Modern Art, El presente está encantador (2017), in which a number of individual sculptures made up of haphazardly fused and seemingly random elements take over the space holding the museum’s permanent collection, directing the viewer into a dialogue with his precedents.

Diego Bianchi’s work is situated on the border between realist and conceptualist traditions, with many of his approach being traceable to the oeuvre of European artists such as Piero Manzoni, Daniel Spoerri, Giuseppe Penone, and Arman.

One of the more dominant themes of Bianchi’s work is the repetitive use of the human body as an artistic element. While visible already in his earlier works, the emphasis on the physical has become more influential in his recent sculptures and installations. Citing the words of feminist artist Barbara Kruger, he takes an approach in which the “body is more a battlefield than a temple”, and therefore an object to be dismembered and distorted. These recent works, such as Pooldance 4 (2017) or Multileg (2017), actively assemble and dis-assemble the borders between the human and the object. Linked to overarching themes of deconstruction and unraveling, these works disrupt the viewer’s expectations and play with the borders between the personal and the impersonal.

The Suspension of Disbelief (2014) is a work which activates these notions in a performance piece. Taking over the entire room, the installation is activated by the performer who suspended on a web of strings attached to his clothing and to his body: the mouth, a finger, his uncovered penis or from both sides of his t-shirt. Every movement also moves the strings, connecting the body to eerie objects that resemble severed body-parts formed out of latex or plastic, or to everyday objects such as a broom or a chair. The preoccupation with the physical appears also in earlier installations, such as the entrance designed by the artist for his exhibition Imperialismo Minimalism (2006) at the Sendros Gallery in Buenos Aires. Placing a steep wooden ramp over the stairs located in the entry to the gallery, Bianchi forces visitors to engage in a physical effort to enter the space as they are left to climb up the construction with the help of ropes.

In addition to aesthetic considerations, Bianchi’s work also examines political themes linked to the precarious socio-economic situation in his home country and the critique of an (art) consumer society, grappling with the paradox created by the simultaneous decay of social norms thanks to the ongoing global crisis and the more hopeful outlook to the future. Starting at the early 2000s, his pieces reflect the evolution of this process brought to the foreground by the spread of neoliberalist policies in Latin America, expressed through an extensive engagement with the relationship between bodies, objects and the spaces which they inhabit. At the same time, through exhibitions such as Shutdown (2016), the artist engages with the perceived numbness of the contemporary art world towards social issues, and the disconnect between the proliferation of aesthetically idyllic art and the more brutal world which it inhabits.

== Exhibitions ==
=== Selected solo exhibitions ===
- 2019: Soft Realism, Galerie Jocelyn Wolff, Paris
- 2018: Pervert Vitrine, 7 rue de la République, Marseille
- 2017: Museo abandonado [Abandoned Museum]. BIENALSUR, Valparaíso, Chile.
- 2017: Under de Si (co-direction with Luis Garay), Matadero, Centro de creación contemporánea, Madrid, Spain
- 2017: El presente está encantador (The Enchanting Now), Museum Art Moderno Buenos Aires - MAMBA, Buenos Aires, Argentina
- 2016: Shutdown, Barro Arte Contemporáneo gallery, Buenos Aires, Argentina
- 2015: The Work in Exhibition, Galerie Jocelyn Wolff, Paris, France
- 2015: Under de Si (co-direction with Luis Garay), Wiener Festwochen, Vienna, Austria
- 2015: Under de Si (co-direction with Luis Garay), Bienal de Performance Argentina, Centro de Arte Experimental UNSAM, Buenos Aires, Argentina
- 2015: WasteAfterWaste, Project Gallery, Pérez Art Museum, Miami, USA
- 2013: Estado de Spam,(State of Spam),Alberto Sendrós gallery, Buenos Aires, Argentina
- 2013: Under de si,(under the influence of himself),Teatro Argentino de La Plata, TACEC, Argentina
- 2013: Into the wild meaning, Visual Arts Center, Texas University, Austin, Texas, USA
- 2012: Reglas y condiciones (Rules and Conditions), Mite Gallery, Buenos Aires, Argentina
- 2012: La isla de los links (The Links Island), Luis Adelantado Gallery, México DF, Mexico
- 2012: Economic Choreography, U-Turn Project Rooms, Arteba, 21 Edition, Argentina
- 2011: The Ultimate Realities, 11th. Biennale de Lyon, A Terrible Beauty is Born, Lyon, France
- 2011: Ensayo de Situación (Situation Rehearsal), Universidad Torcuato Di Tella, Buenos Aires, Argentina
- 2010: Ejercicios espirituales (Spiritual Exercises), Centro Cultural Recoleta, Buenos Aires, Argentina Panic picnic, Banco Ciudad-arteBA 2010, Buenos Aires, Argentina
- 2009: Monumento para un sótano (Monument for a basement), in collaboration with six artists. Fondo Nacional de las Artes, Buenos Aires, Argentina
- 2009: La crisis es estética (The crisis is aesthetic), X Bienal de la Habana, Cuba
- 2009: Un ritmo que nos sigue (A rhythm that follows us), Performing Arco 09, Madrid, Spain
- 2008: Las formas que no son (The forms that are not), galería Alberto Sendrós, Buenos Aires, Argentina
- 2008: La música que viene (The music that's coming), Museo de Arte Contemporáneo de Rosario, Santa Fe, Argentina
- 2007: From deep inside, Luis Adelantado Gallery, Miami, USA
- 2007: La escultura del presente (The sculpture of the present), Centro Uno de Arte Contemporáneo, Roca, Río Negro, Argentina
- 2007: Wake me up when the present arrives, Locust Projects, Miami, USA
- 2006: My summer bunker Project, Luis Adelantado Gallery, Miami, USA
- 2006: Imperialismo Minimalismo (Imperialism Minimalism), galería Alberto Sendrós, Buenos Aires, Argentina
- 2005: Escuelita Thomas Hirschhorn (Thomas Hirschhorn's School House), en colaboración con Leopoldo Estol, galería Belleza y Felicidad, Buenos Aires, Argentina
- 2004: Daños (Damages), galería Belleza y Felicidad, Buenos Aires, Argentina Estática (Static), Galería Alberto Sendrós, Buenos Aires, Argentina
- 2003: Embale (Pack), Raumkunst, Boquitas Pintadas, Buenos Aires, Argentina Galerie Jocelyn Wolff

=== Selected group exhibitions ===
- 2017: Naturaleza, refugio del hombre. Centro Cultural Kirchner, Buenos Aires, Argentina
- 2016: What Matters? ¿Qué cuenta? Was zählt?, Hochschule für Bildende Künste (HfBK), Dresden, Germany
- 2016: Oasis, Dixit Arte, Buenos Aires, Argentina
- 2015: Experiencia infinita, MALBA, Buenos Aires, Argentina
- 2015: Hacer con lo hecho, Museo Arte Moderno Cuenca, Cuenca, Ecuador
- 2015: The predictions of a One-Night King, Chalet Society, Fiac, Paris, France
- 2015: My Buenos Aires, La Maison Rouge, Paris, France
- 2013: 13th Istanbul Biennial, Mom, am I a barbarian? Salt, Turquey
- 2013: Slow Burn, Fundament Foundation, An index of possibilities, Spoorzone 013, Tilburg, Netherlands
- 2013: Premio Braque, Universidad 3 de febrero, Caseros, Argentina
- 2012: Aire de Lyon, Fundación PROA, Buenos Aires, Argentina
- 2012: Nuevas Tendencias, Museo de Arte Moderno de Buenos Aires (MAMBA), Buenos Aires, Argentina
- 2011: Lo cotidiano de doce artistas, Museo de Arte Contemporáneo de Salta, Salta, Argentina
- 2010: Beuys y más allá – El enseñar como arte, Centro Cultural Recoleta, Buenos Aires, Argentina
- 2007 Ouro sentimental, Museo de Arte Contemporáneo de Niteroi, Río de Janeiro, Brasil
- 2007: É jhuno, mas parece Novembro, Galería Polinesia, San Pablo, Brasil
- 2007: Premio arte, BA-Petrobras a las Artes Visuales, Buenos Aire, Argentina 2006
- 2007: Jardines de Mayo, Casa de la Cultura, Buenos Aires, Argentina
