= Matrix (talk show) =

- Starring: Enrico Mentana (2005-2009); Alessio Vinci (2009-2012); Luca Telese (2013-2016); Nicola Porro and Greta Mauro (2016-2019, 2020 COVID Special)
- Opening theme: Live and Let Die
- Country of origin: Italy
- Original language: Italian
- No. of episodes: N/A

Production
- Running time: 120 minutes

Original release
- Network: Canale 5
- Release: September 5, 2005 – May 1, 2020

Matrix is an Italian news and talk show television program, broadcast on Canale 5, from 2005 to 2020, and rerun on Mediaset Plus. It was a rival program of RAI flagship news program Porta a Porta.

== Background ==
The program was created in 2005 by Enrico Mentana and Le Iene author Davide Parenti, with Mentana hosting the show. Broadcast three times a week in the late night slot, the program progressively improved its ratings, reaching a 18% ratings share. Mentana left the show in 2009, when he resigned after the network opposed his idea of following the Eluana Englaro euthanasia case with a special episode of the program in favour of the reality show Grande Fratello. He was replaced by CNN journalist Alessio Vinci.
