= Enrico Mentana =

Italian journalist and television presenter

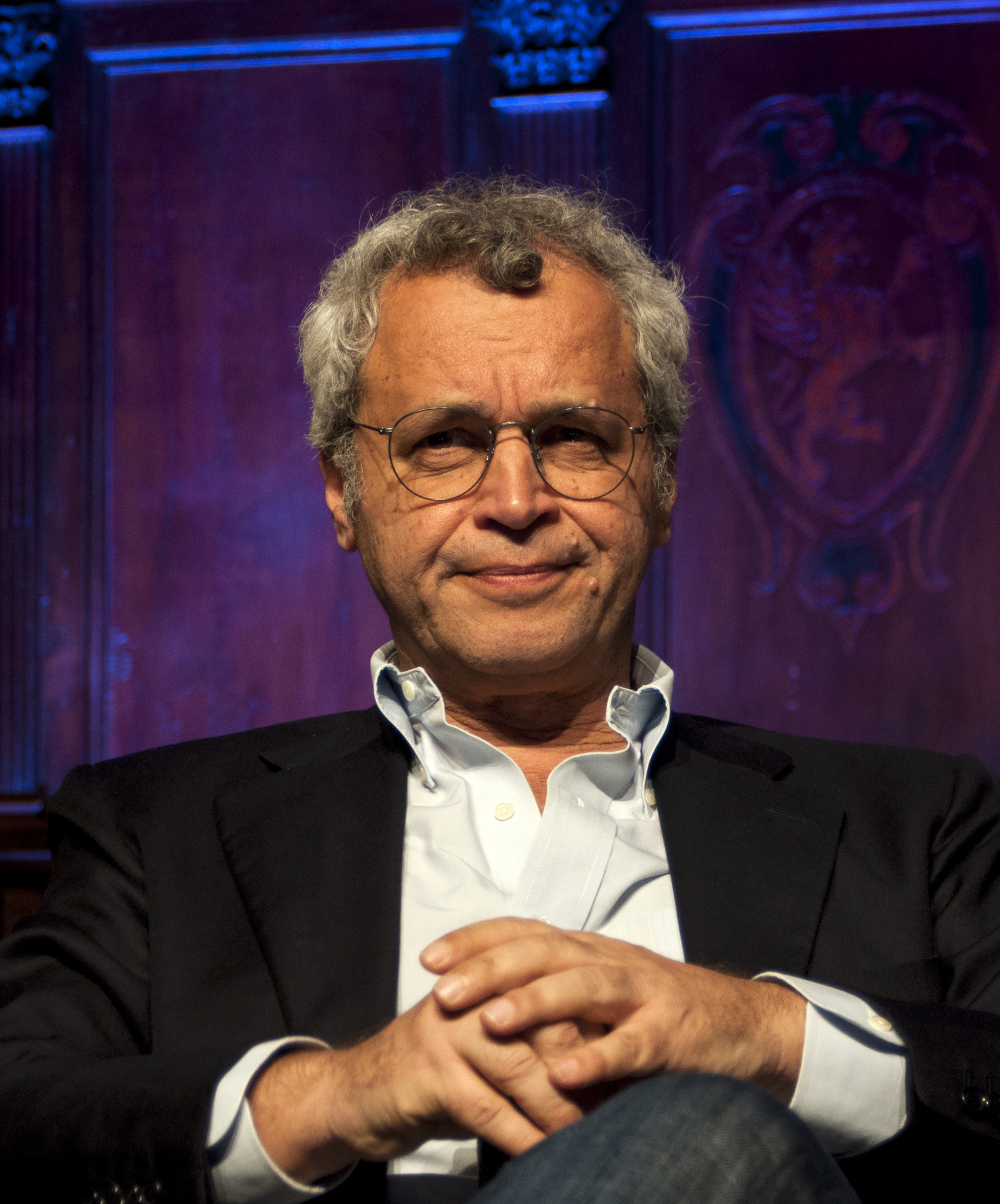
- Mentana in 2016
- Born: 15 January 1955 (age 71); Milan, Italy
- Spouse: Michela Rocco di Torrepadula (m. 2002; div. 2013)
- Partner: Francesca Fagnani (2013–present)
- Children: 4
- Website: www.la7.it/speciali-mentana

Enrico Mentana (born 15 January 1955) is an Italian journalist and television presenter. He founded the Italian news programme TG5 and directed it from 1992 to 2004. In 2005, as Canale 5's editorial director, he conceived and curated the talk show Matrix until his resignation in 2009 due to a disagreement with the network. Since June 2010 he has been the director of the news programme TG La7. He is also the director of the online newspaper Open, which he founded in December 2018.

== Early life ==
Enrico Mentana was born in Milan on 15 January 1955. He is the eldest son of Franco Mentana, well-known correspondent of La Gazzetta dello Sport and native of Bova, and Lella, of Jewish origins. He was baptized as a Catholic, although he will always show great closeness to the Jewish people. His younger brother, Vittorio, was responsible for AC Milan football club's communication until 2018. He grew up in Milan's district of Giambellino, he attended the Liceo Ginnasio Alessandro Manzoni, first joining the small anarchist group Movimento Socialista Libertario, in 1968, and then the Italian Socialist Party.

He collaborated and then became director of the magazine Giovane Sinistra, the official organ of the Federation of Young Socialists (Federazione Giovanile Socialista Italiana), of which he was vice-president from 1977 to 1979. He enrolled in the Faculty of Political Sciences of the University of Milan but never graduated.

In an interview, he stated that he "always thought of being a journalist" because of his father: "because of my love and my admiration for him". He joined the redaction of La Gazzetta dello Sport as a proofreader in 1973, when he was 18 years old. He became a professional journalist on 2 February 1982.

== Journalistic career ==
=== Beginnings in Rai ===
On 27 February 1980, Mentana was hired by RAI, Italy's public radio and television broadcaster, at the Foreign Affairs editorial staff of TG1, the newscast hosted on the main channel Rai 1. His video debut was in 1981 as a special correspondent in London with the report of the marriage between Charles of England and Lady Diana. His first well-known interview was with the mother of Mehmet Ali Ağca after his assassination attempt against Pope John Paul II. He made a swift career in the company, which led him to be the anchor of the mid-evening edition of TG1 first and then editor-in-chief of the weekly TV documentary Speciale TG1, taking over from Alberto La Volpe.

In 1987, he refused the request from Bettino Craxi, the leader of the Italian Socialist Party, to be the main spokesperson for a political commercial; the spot was characterized by the motto "Perhaps a carnation would be good for you too" ("Forse un garofano starebbe bene anche a voi"). This stance led to tension between Mentana and the Rai management. Starting in 1988, Mentana was restricted to minor roles; on 16 January 1989, he was appointed deputy editor of TG2, but was removed a year later. In 1991, he was fired from Rai.

=== Arrival in Fininvest and foundation of TG5 ===
In the autumn of 1991, Mentana began working for Fininvest. On 13 January 1992, together with the journalists Lamberto Sposini, Clemente J. Mimun, Emilio Carelli, Cesara Buonamici and Cristina Parodi, he started TG5, Canale 5's newscast. Mentana, who was only 37 years old at the time, debuted by saying: "what you will see will be a fast newscast, formally well-finished, no lush sets. [It] will fight with the others without any inferiority complex."

TG5's audience often exceeded seven million listeners and beat TG1 in viewership several times, making Mentana one of the best-known TV hosts in Italy. The first time it happened was with the breaking news edition announcing the murder of the judge Giovanni Falcone); other notable events were the interview with Farouk Kassam, 7-year-old child kidnapped in 1992, and the confrontation between Silvio Berlusconi and Achille Occhetto before the 1994 Italian general election. He was also the moderator of the face-to-face between Silvio Berlusconi and Romano Prodi before the subsequent 1996 Italian general election.

In 1994, Mentana criticized the choice of the dismissal of Indro Montanelli from Il Giornale giving first the news and interviewing him live on TG5 on the same day. Giuliano Ferrara responded by asking for his resignation; however, Silvio Berlusconi confirmed his continued trust in him.

In 2001, he presented Rotocalco (the term refers to the rotogravure, the process which enabled editors to print illustrated news magazines in the 1920s; by extension, rotocalco televisivo is a current affairs television programme supported by curated video reports). From 2001, he directed TGcom, Mediaset's first news website; in the same year, he launched Terra!, TG5's in-depth column (edited and conducted by the news correspondent Toni Capuozzo).

On 11 November 2004, during the newscast closure, Mentana announced that the company exempted him from the direction of TG5, replacing him with Carlo Rossella. He was thus leaving the news he founded and directed for almost thirteen years. He commented live: "[this] is their right as a company; equally obvious is my bitterness. ... Over the years, Mediaset has always offered me what I wanted. If you didn't like something, it was my fault—there haven't been any corporate interference." A few days later he was appointed editorial director of Mediaset.

=== Foundation of late-night talk show Matrix ===
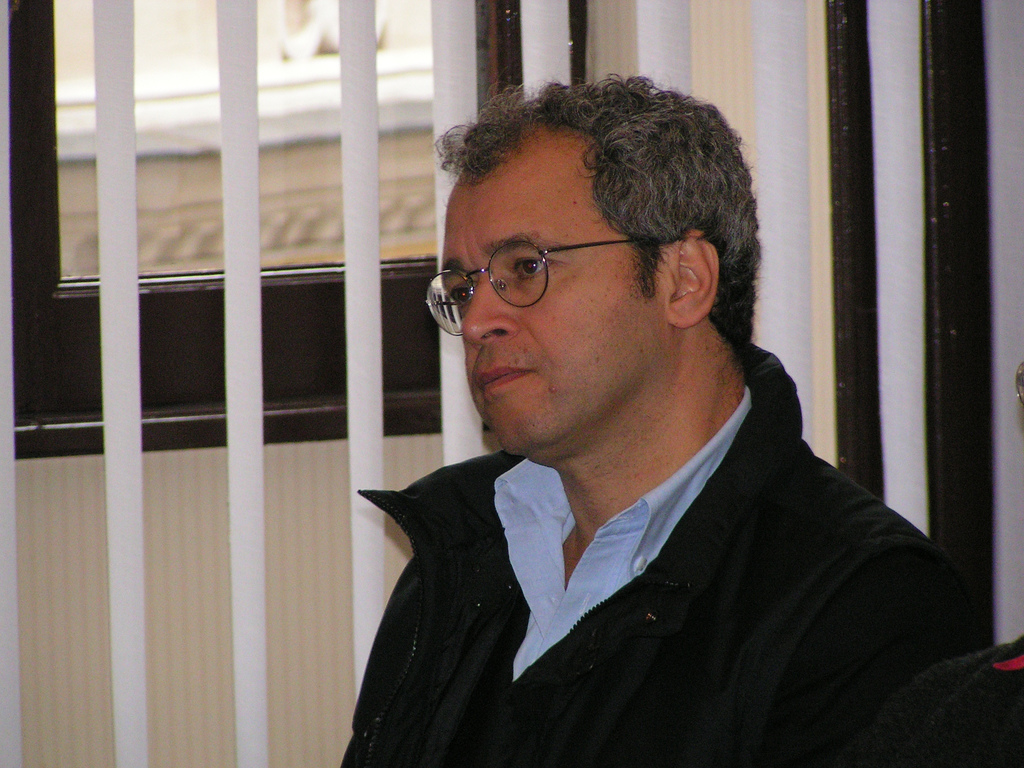
Mentana in 2004

At the end of December 2004, he hosted a special dedicated to the tragedy of the 2004 Indian Ocean tsunami. In 2005, following the death of the Florentine writer Oriana Fallaci, he proposed to establish a foundation that would collect all her writings and dedicate her a television reportage.

On 5 September 2005, ten months after leaving TG5, Mentana debuted with Canale 5's new information programme, Matrix, which he conceived and conducted three times a week in the late-night in direct competition with Bruno Vespa's Porta a Porta. He commented: "In November I left TG5, and I was not consenting. I said it loud and clear. But martial law is not in force at Mediaset. I had a clarification with Confalonieri: he is the president, I am an employee."

In the academic year 2006–2007, he was a professor of Master in journalism at the University of Milan. On the occasion of the 2008 Italian general election, he interviewed the candidates for prime minister Walter Veltroni and Silvio Berlusconi in a prime-time edition of Matrix.

=== TG La7 ===
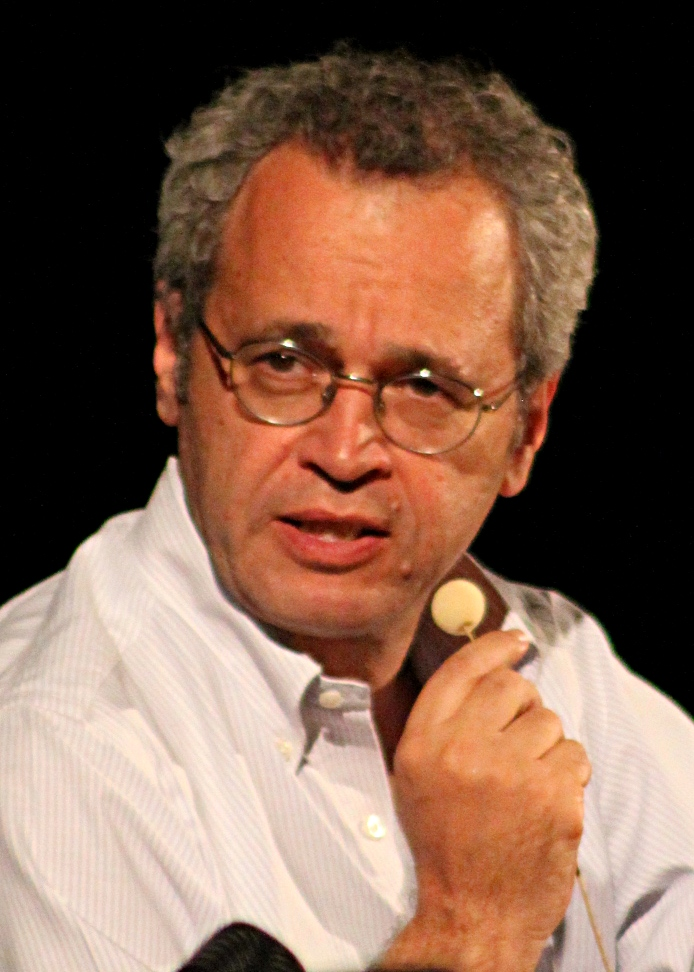
Mentana in 2011

After his experience at TG5, he moved to TG La7, the newscast hosted on the privately owned channel La7. He became its director in July 2010.

== Awards and honours ==
- In 1995, he received the Ischia International Journalism Award.
- Asteroid 48720 Enricomentana was named in his honour. The official naming citation was published by the Minor Planet Center on 31 January 2018 (M.P.C. 108697).

== Personal life ==
Since 2013, Mentana has been romantically linked to journalist Francesca Fagnani.
