= Alessandra Sardoni =

Italian journalist

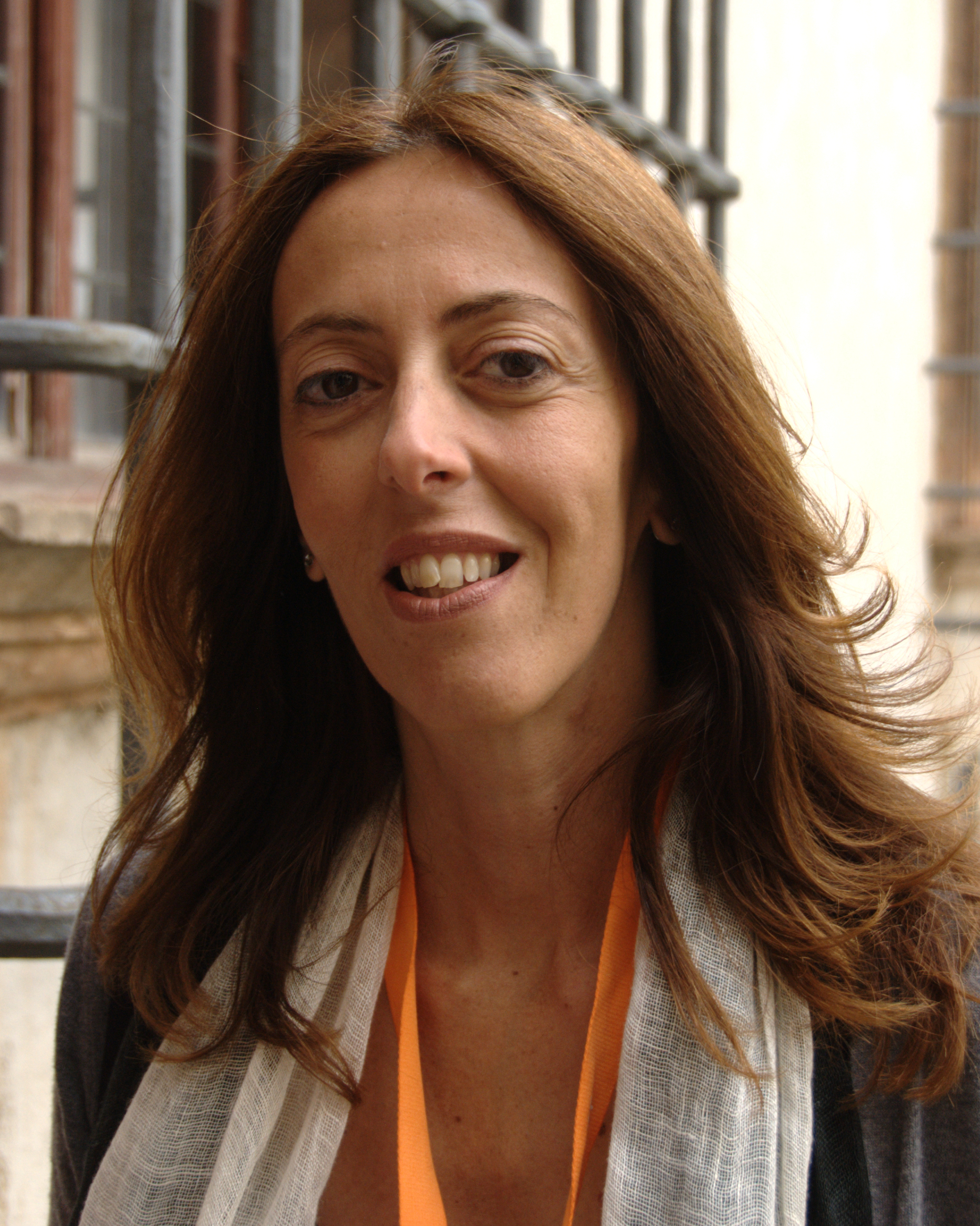
- Born: 5 May 1964 (age 61); Rome
- Occupation: Journalist

Alessandra Sardoni (born 5 May 1964) is an Italian journalist and television presenter.

== Biography ==
Sardoni was born in Rome on 5 May 1964. She studied with Tullio De Mauro and graduated with a degree in Philosophy of language. In 1991 Sardoni worked for the Naples section of la Repubblica. In March 1994, she became a member of the Lazio order of journalists. Sardoni became a political commentator and began working in television. She hosted Otto e mezzo and Omnibus. Sardoni now works for La7 and is one of the leading faces of the network. She has also become a writer with two books to her name.

From 2012 until April 2015, she was president of the Parliamentary Press Association, the first woman to hold the position. In June 2015, she was awarded Il Premiolino, the most prestigious journalism award in Italy.

== Works ==
- Il fantasma del leader, (2009)
- Irresponsabili: Il Potere Italiano e La Pretesa dell’Innocenza, (2017).
