= Alessio Vinci =

Italian journalist

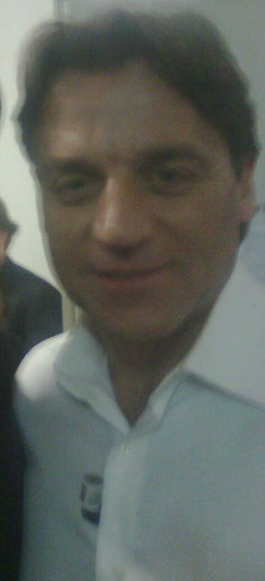
- Born: Alessio Vinci; 15 April 1968 (age 58); Luxembourg City, Luxembourg

Alessio Vinci (born 15 April 1968) is an Italian journalist, working for CNN since 1989. He has served as CNN's bureau chief in Belgrade from 1999 to 2000 and in Rome from 2001 up to the present. He was the host of Matrix, a news and debate television program on Mediaset's Canale 5, from 2009 and 2012.

He received the America Award of the Italy-USA Foundation in 2016.
