= Niente di Personale =

- Starring: Antonello Piroso
- Opening theme: Kiss of Life
- Country of origin: Italy
- Original language: Italian
- No. of episodes: N/A

Production
- Running time: 180 mins.

Original release
- Network: La7
- Release: 2003 – present

Niente di Personale (known also with the acronym NDP) is an Italian television talk show hosted by the Italian journalist Antonello Piroso and is broadcast on La7 since 2003.
