= Killing of Marta Russo =

1997 shooting of a university student in Rome, Italy

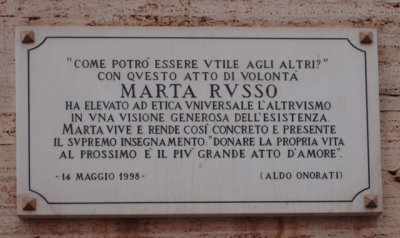
The plaque in memory of Marta Russo, University of Rome La Sapienza

Marta Russo was a 22-year-old student at the school of law at the Sapienza University of Rome, who was shot and killed within the university grounds. Her death was the centre of a complex court case that garnered huge media attention owing to the lack of substantial evidence and motive.

After a six-years-long trial Giovanni Scattone was found guilty of involuntary manslaughter, and Salvatore Ferraro was declared responsible for aiding and abetting. The other accused man, Francesco Liparota, was acquitted, then convicted in appeal, and then dismissed by all allegations.

== Description ==
On 9 May 1997, at about 11:42, a 0.22 calibre bullet hit Marta Russo while she walked with a friend, Jolanda Ricci, on the university's grounds, in a driveway located between the university's schools of Statistical Sciences, Law and Political Science. She was transported to the nearby Policlinico Umberto I but died on 14 May without regaining consciousness. Her parents donated her organs, respecting Marta's desire expressed a few years earlier, speaking about the death of Nicholas Green. Forensic tests showed traces of gunpowder on the sill of a window on the second floor, a reading room in the legal philosophy department. Afterwards (1998), a forensic expert established that such residues were not gunpowder but residual pollution.

The circle tightened around the 25 or so people who often used the room to consult textbooks or use computers. Telephone records identified one person, Maria Chiara Lipari, the daughter of a professor, who indicated – after many uncertainties – the presence of a secretary, Gabriella Alletto, and other people. After an interrogation, during which she was threatened to be arrested for voluntary murder, Gabriella Alletto, after a conflicting testimony, implicated Giovanni Scattone, age 29, and Salvatore Ferraro, age 30, who were junior lecturers in the legal philosophy department of Rome's La Sapienza University, and Francesco Liparota, usher and graduate in law. Neither had a criminal record nor a reason to murder Ms. Russo. The woman accused also professor Bruno Romano of reticence, then defended by well-known lawyers Franco Coppi and Giulia Bongiorno (future lawyer of Raffaele Sollecito in the case of the murder of Meredith Kercher). Then, a videotape with the interrogation, recorded by secret services, came out, showing the stages of interrogation and presence of Alletto's brother-in-law (a policeman), who told her she should have accused some suspects, even though "maybe she did not see materially" the scene of shooting, because "it's best to let them do the crime". The recording also showed the prosecutors warning her, saying "You are guilty of murder" and "you will never again come out of prison".

Prime Minister Romano Prodi criticized these facts and described as "very serious matter" the behaviour of two prosecutors, Mr. Italo Ormanni e and Mr. Carlo Lasperanza. Even Silvio Berlusconi's opposition attacked the prosecutors.

The Italian public has been divided on the guilt of the accused. Some famous personalities (like judge of the Aldo Moro kidnapping Ferdinando Imposimato, politician Marco Pannella and journalist Paolo Mieli) claim the innocence of Scattone and Ferraro and publicly defend them. The trial, which lasted over a year, followed by long appeals, involved investigations into prosecutorial misconduct and possible threatening of witnesses, and questioning the credibility of the main witnesses for the prosecution. The criminal court of Perugia, however, absolved the prosecutors from the accusation of abuse of office, threat and private violence against Gabriella Alletto.

== Media attention ==
The case gained huge attention in the media, owing to the apparent indiscriminate nature in which the victim was targeted. The public was so interested that court proceedings were broadcast live on radio. Campus killings were unheard of in Italy, leading to parents of students being so scared for their children that they insisted on them wearing motorcycle helmets while outside. More than 10,000 students attended Russo's funeral, joined by the Prime Minister Prodi, the Italian President Oscar Luigi Scalfaro and other dignitaries. The Pope John Paul II sent a message of condolence. Academics were banned from speaking directly to the press.

== Trial ==
The trial began in June 1998; some neutral forensics affirmed during the trial the innocence of Scattone and Ferraro, arguing that the shot was fired from the ground floor, while Liparota revealed that he was threatened by the police to accuse his colleagues; initially confirming the allegations, he then retracted by saying that he had not seen anything. There was a telephone bill that, combined with other testimonial reports, contradicted many details of the story of Maria Chiara Lipari and indirectly the allegations of Alletto. Finally, the public prosecutor's office demanded an 18-year prison sentence for voluntary murder, with mitigating effects as no premeditation would have been made, but it would have been possible ("dolo eventuale", in Italian "eventual malice", a less serious case of murder). In December both defendants had been released and placed in house arrest until judgment.

In June 1999, jury rejected the attorney's requests and Giovanni Scattone was convicted of involuntary manslaughter of Russo, caused by his criminal negligence or carelessness (Italian "colpa cosciente" which can be translated as conscious fault), and Salvatore Ferraro was convicted of aiding and abetting Scattone.

After a confirming appeal (2001), at the request of another prosecutor, Court's Attorney General Vincenzo Geraci, the verdict was annulled by the Supreme Court of Cassation for lack of evidence (December 2001); a new appeal reiterated the conviction (2002), then confirmed definitively in 2003 (finally, the punishment consisted to 5 years and four months of prison for Giovanni Scattone, 4 years and two months to Salvatore Ferraro). Scattone and Ferraro have always claimed to be innocent, and to have been framed by perjury. Instead, the supreme court dismissed Francesco Liparota (overturning his previously conviction for complicity) - because he was not punishable at the time, according to the judges he would have covered the shot because he was too scared - and, previously, acquitted even Bruno Romano.

After a penalty discount, Scattone ended up serving the sentence in prison (2003–2004) and to house arrest until 2005; later, having the court granted him the complete legal criminal rehabilitation, eliminating perpetual interdictions from public offices, he became a high school professor of philosophy until 2015, when he got a job as a psychology teacher, but resigned following the controversies by the press and the Russo family. Scattone wrote some essays and translations; in 2001, he married Cinzia Giorgio, writer and scriptwriter. Salvatore Ferraro devoted himself to political activism and to the activity of lawyer and bookseller. Scattone and Ferraro were also sentenced to civil compensation of 1 million euro to Marta Russo's parents and sister in 2011.
