= Diego Bianchi (journalist) =

Italian journalist and television presenter (born 1969)

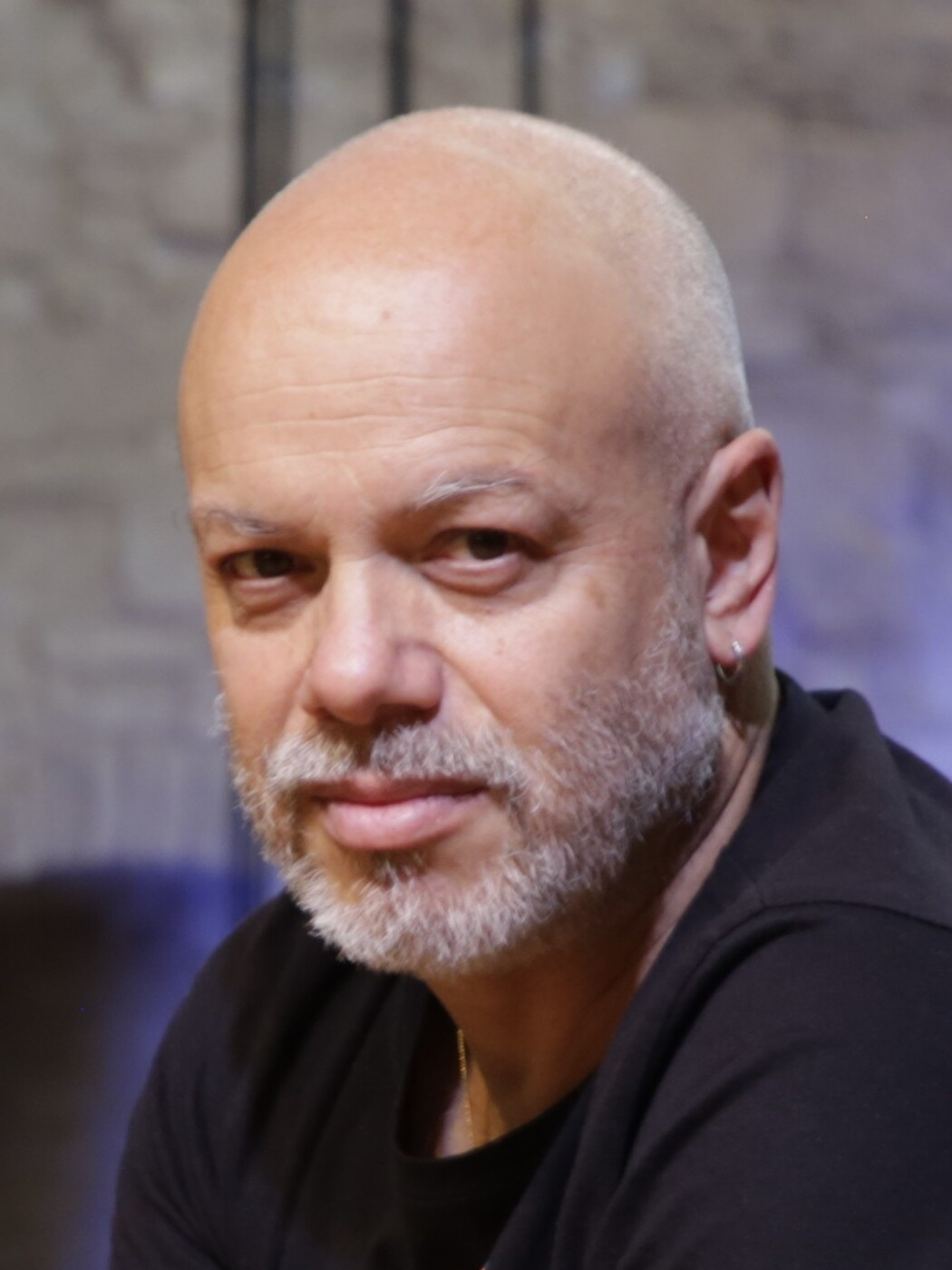
- Diego Bianchi in 2026 at the International Journalism Festival in Perugia
- Born: 28 October 1969 (age 56); Rome, Italy
- Other name: Zoro
- Years active: 2000–present
- Known for: Propaganda Live
- Website: Zoro's Z

Diego Bianchi (born 28 October 1969) is an Italian television presenter, journalist, former blogger and YouTuber. Bianchi often worked under the pseudonym Zoro. He is among other things known as the presenter of the television show Propaganda Live.

== Career ==
Born and raised in the Roman area of San Giovanni, Bianchi obtained his high school diploma at the classical high school "Augusto". He then graduated in Political Science at Sapienza University of Rome under supervisor Domenico Fisichella, with a thesis on the political parties La Rete of Leoluca Orlando and the Lega Nord of Umberto Bossi.

Since his childhood he has been passionate about music, and began playing the violin and then percussion, which he also played on stage at the 1996 edition of the Musicultura festival with the Original Slammer Band.

=== 2000–2008 ===
In 2000 he began working as a content manager for the web portal Excite Italia. Since 2003, under the pseudonym "Zoro", he began blogging at the site "La Z di Zoro".

During this period he also wrote comic summaries of the episodes of Big Brother, which, starting from 2007, became videos published for Excite on YouTube.

Continuing his work as a YouTuber, in September of the same year he started the column Tolleranza Zoro (Zero Tolerance) on his channel, focused on analyzing, in an ironic and satirical way, the different currents of the newborn Italian Democratic Party.

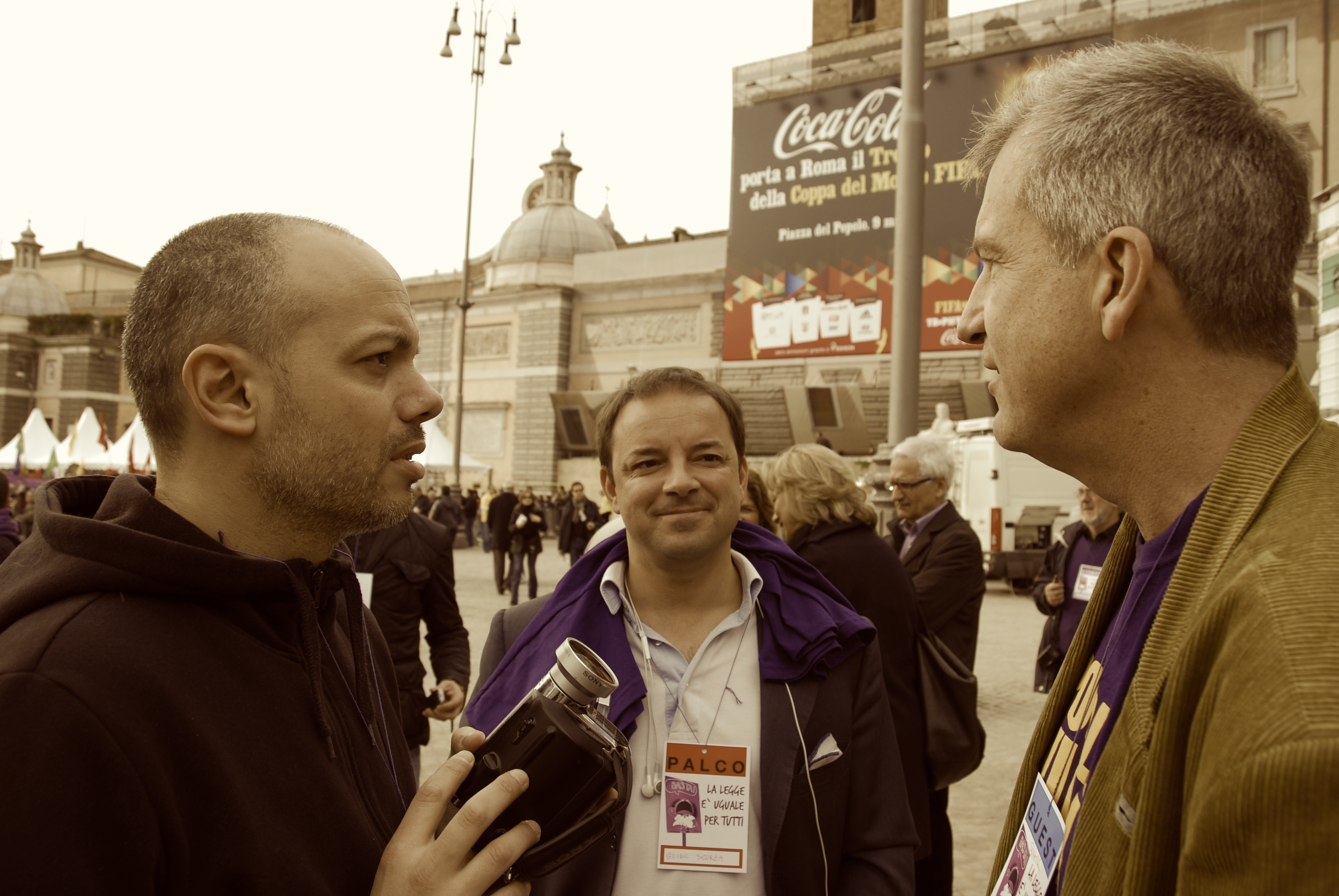
From left: Bianchi with Guido Scorza and Alessandro Gilioli in Rome in 2010, while carrying out gonzo journalism at a Popolo Viola demonstration

From the end of 2007 to May 2010 he edited his own column in the daily newspaper Il Riformista, entitled La posta di Zoro (Zoro's mail). Also in 2007 the television channel LA7 asked him to create a blog for their website, which was born on 5 December of the same year with the name La 7 di 7oro (The 7 of Zoro). Since October 2010 he has also written a column in the weekly Il Venerdì di Repubblica entitled Il sogno di Zoro (Zoro's dream).

=== 2008–present ===
Bianchi made his television debut on 30 April 2008, with his segment Tolleranza Zoro being broadcast in Enrico Mentana's show Matrix on Canale 5. In the same year he joined the cast of Serena Dandini's show Parla con me on Rai 3, in which the videos of the segment Tolleranza Zoro were broadcast. This was the first time in Italy that a product born on the web was reproduced on television with the same original format. On 30 December 2011 LA7 broadcast Zoro 2011 - Finale di partita (Zoro 2011 - Endgame), a special episode of Tolleranza Zoro, a documentary summarising the political year that had just ended.

In January 2012 he followed Dandini to LA7 and joined the cast of the programme The Show Must Go Off, which broadcast episodes of Tolleranza Zoro. In 2013 he returned to Rai with a show hosted by him for the first time, Gazebo; broadcast initially weekly in the late evening, and then daily in the pre-evening, until 2017. In the meantime, after making his film debut in 2012 in Il sole dentro by Paolo Bianchini, in 2014 he directed and starred in Arance & martello, which was presented at the 71st Venice International Film Festival.

Since September 2017 he has returned to LA7 with the show Propaganda Live.

In 2016 Bianchi was given the Archivio Disarmo Golden Dove for Peace Award, awarded annually to four journalists devoted to themes of peace and disarmament. In 2018 Bianchi won the Subito Gressoney Award for innovation in journalism. In the same year he was given the LGBT Person of the Year Award for his raising awareness of and support for LGBT rights. In 2022 Bianchi won the Funari Award for newsagent of the year.

== Personal life ==
Bianchi is in a relationship with Michela Tassistro, and the couple have a daughter, Anita, born in 2003, who occasionally appears on his television shows. He is the uncle of the actor Ludovico Tersigni, who made his acting debut in Bianchi's film Arance & martello.

== TV shows ==
- Talk to Me (2008–2011)
- Zoro 2011 - Endgame (2011)
- The Show Must Go Off (2012)
- AnnoZoro - Endgame (2013)
- Gazebo (2013–2017)
- Propaganda Live (2017–present)
