= TG La7 =

Italian television news show

- Logo since 2010
- Presented by: Enrico Mentana
- Country of origin: Italy
- Original language: Italian
- No. of episodes: N/A

Production
- Running time: 35 mins.

Original release
- Network: La7
- Release: 2001 – present

TG La7 (Italian: TeleGiornale La7, lit. 'La7 News') is the brand for Italian TV channel La7's news programmes. They are shown domestically on La7 several times throughout the day. It was launched in 2001.

== Programme format ==
The programme is generally presented by a single newsreader but with additional newsreaders for the sports.

== Editions and presenters ==
=== TG LA7 07:30 (TG LA7 7.30 a.m.) ===
- Edgardo Gulotta
- Flavia Fratello
- Fabio Angelicchio
- Emanuela Garulli

=== TG LA7 13:30 (TG LA7 1.30 p.m.) ===
- Cristina Fantoni
- Luca Speciale
- Adriana Bellini
- Bianca Caterina Bizzarri

=== TG LA7 ore 20:00 (TG LA7 8 p.m.) ===
- Enrico Mentana
- Francesca Fanuele (week-end)
- Paolo Celata (week-end)

=== TG LA7 Notte (TG LA7 12 p.m.) ===
- Paola Mascioli
- Edoardo Soldati
- Andrea Prandi
- Paolo Stella
- Franco Rina

When there is a very important fact, this edition is almost always conducted by Enrico Mentana.

== Journalists ==
- Adalberto Baldini
- Alessandra Livi
- Alessandra Sardoni
- Alessandro Usai
- Andrea D'Orazio
- Andrea Molino
- Andrea Pennacchioli
- Andrea Prandi
- Antonella Galli
- Armando Sommajuolo
- Barbara Batticciotto
- Bianca Caterina Bizzarri
- Camilla Moreno
- Cinzia Malvini
- Cristina Fantoni
- Damiano Ficoneri
- Daniela Comirato
- Daniele Maglie
- Edoardo Soldati
- Emanuela Garulli
- Emiliano Maini
- Fabio Angelicchio
- Fabrizio Calia
- Felicia Giudice
- Filippo Barone
- Filippo Pirillo
- Flavia Fratello
- Francesca Fanuele
- Francesca Roversi
- Francesca Todini
- Franco Rina
- Frediano Finucci
- Gabriella Caimi
- Gianluca Galeazzi
- Guy Chiappaventi
- Laura Perego
- Leonardo Zellino
- Leslie Guglielmetti
- Lorenza Ceccarini
- Lorenzo Morelli
- Luca Del Re
- Lucio Musolino
- Manuela Ferri
- Marco Ferini
- Marco Fratini
- Marco Guarella
- Marco Lanza
- Maria Covotta
- Maria Rosaria Pezzuto
- Martino Villosio
- Massimo Mapelli
- Nicolò Di Thiene
- Ninfa Colasanto
- Paola Mascioli
- Paolo Argentini
- Paolo Cecinelli
- Paolo Celata
- Paolo Stella
- Raffaella Di Rosa
- Raffaella Leone
- Raniero Altavilla
- Roberto Bernabai
- Roberto Menichini
- Rossana Russo
- Rossella Matera
- Silvia Brasca
- Simona Buonomano
- Simone Costa
- Sonia Mancini
- Stefano Ferrante
- Tiziana Stella
- Ugo Francica Nava
- Umberto Nigri
- Vincenzo Adornetto

== See also ==
- La7
