= La7 =

Italian television channel

- Type: La7
- Country: Italy
- Headquarters: Rome, Italy

Programming
- Picture format: 1080i HDTV (downscaled to 16:9 576i for the SDTV feed)

Ownership
- Owner: Cairo Communication
- Sister channels: La7 Cinema (formerly LA7d)

History
- Founded: 25 May 2001
- Launched: 24 June 2001
- Replaced: Telemontecarlo

Links
- Webcast: La7 – Watch Live
- Website: la7.it

Availability

Terrestrial
- Digital terrestrial television: Channel 7 (HD)

La7 is an Italian free-to-air television channel owned by Cairo Communication and has another channel named La7 Cinema, which had acquired it from Telecom Italia Media, itself owned by Telecom Italia, in 2013.

La7 features a generalist programming schedule, primarily focused on news, current affairs, and entertainment. The channel is known for its in-depth political analysis, talk shows, and investigative journalism, often serving as an alternative to Italy's major public and commercial broadcasters.

The official voice-over announcer of La7 is the renowned dubbing artist Francesco Prando, and advertising sales are managed by Cairo Pubblicità.

The channel is available across Italy via digital terrestrial television, as well as on satellite platforms such as Sky Italia and Tivùsat. It is also accessible in Switzerland through cable providers.

== History ==
=== Telemontecarlo ===
Telemontecarlo
- Country: Italy; Monaco
- Headquarters: Rome, Italy

Programming
- Language: Italian
- Picture format: 576i SDTV

Ownership
- Owner: Tele Monte Carlo (1974–1985); Organizações Globo (1985–1994); Montedison (1994–1995); Cecchi Gori Group (1995–2000); Telecom Italia Media (2000–2001)

History
- Launched: 5 August 1974
- Closed: 24 June 2001
- Replaced by: La7

Telemontecarlo (TMC), founded in 1974, was the Italian language television channel from Monaco. At that time, the channel was one of the only two competitors of the Italian public television network RAI, broadcasting in colour (TV Koper-Capodistria launched in 1971). After the introduction of the Mediaset channels, TMC struggled until 2001. However, in 1999, its last owner, the film producer Vittorio Cecchi Gori, sold the network to SEAT Pagine Gialle.

In the 1970s and early 1980s, the Monegasque network was the main alternative to the RAI television channels. It was one of the international Italian-language television broadcasters available in the Italian peninsula.

Starting in the mid-1980s, Telemontecarlo increasingly became a niche channel following the rise of the Fininvest channels, particularly Canale 5. In 1990, it obtained a license to broadcast across the entire national territory under the Mammì Law.

==== Télé Monte Carlo administration ====
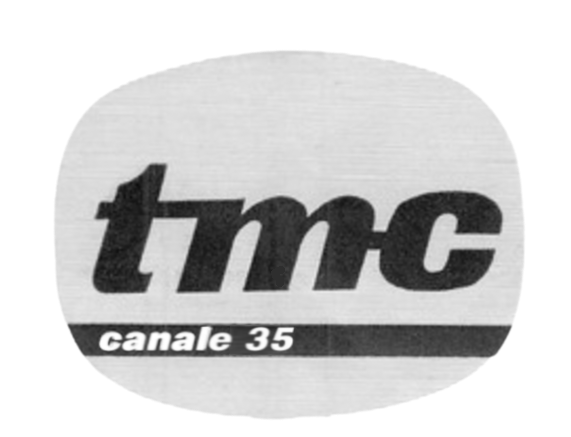
Logo used in the experimental phase

The birth of the Italian TMC (Telemontecarlo) was influenced by the Italian government's decision to adopt color television broadcasts, with the choice between the PAL and SÉCAM standards to be determined later. In 1971, during the debate over these standards, French industrialists reportedly proposed to President Georges Pompidou that TMC broadcast in Italian and in color by using the SÉCAM standard. The broadcasts would target Rome and the Italian coast from the ORTF transmitter in Bastia, Corsica, aiming to promote SÉCAM receivers in the Italian market. However, President Pompidou declined the proposal.

Technical tests in SÉCAM color, intended for Italy, took place in June 1971 with the establishment of UHF channel 35, broadcast in the PAL-G standard with a power of 50 kW. After several tests, in 1973 TMC broadcast some programs in Italian on this channel in an experimental form, which subsequently became Tele Monte Carlo in 1974.

The official inauguration of the Italian service was held on 5 August 1974, one month after the ruling of the Italian Constitutional Court of 10 July 1974, number 225, which sanctioned the legitimacy of foreign relay systems. The first show transmitted by Telemontecarlo was Un peu d'amour, d'amitié et beaucoup de musique ("A Little Bit of Love, Friendship and a Lot of Music"), hosted by Jocelyn Hattab, who couldn't speak proper Italian at the time, and his wife Sophie. Initially, Genova and Turin were its primary targets. At an extraordinary general assembly convened on January 15, 1975, it announced its expansion to Milan (where the Italian channel would eventually be headquartered) by the end of March, still using the SECAM format.

In its first year, Télé Monte Carlo began broadcasting its programs in color, standing out among Italian viewers' television options, as RAI channels didn't have this technology until 1977. In addition to operating outside Italian borders (but with many repeaters in Italian territory, covering a large part of the Italian peninsula), the broadcaster also aired its programs in Italy on a national scale, thus becoming (along with the other two foreign networks of Italy, TV Koper-Capodistria and TSI) one of the first alternatives to RAI channels for the Italian public. As a Monegasque TV, Telé Monte Carlo could broadcast live on a national network, unlike private Italian networks, for which this was not possible until 1991, as it was an exclusive right of the public television service. Like RAI, Telé Monte Carlo was also a member of Eurovision.

The network had its first collaborators, the sports journalist Gianni Brera, director of the network's first sports program, Puntosport, and also Mike Bongiorno, although not in an official way. Indro Montanelli also worked at the network, creating in 1976, the network's news program Il Giornale Nuovo, produced by the Milanese newspaper of the same name, which he himself founded. The program lasted ten minutes, being divided into two parts: in the first (Notiziario), the announcer Antonio Devia read the most important news of the day, written by Il Giornale. In the second (Editoriale), Indro Montanelli (or one of the Milanese newspaper's main columnists, such as Enzo Bettiza, Mario Cervi or Cesare Zappulli) presented his opinion on the day's event. The commentary was recorded in Milan in the late morning and then transported to Monaco by car. From 29 August 1977, the newscast was divided into two nightly editions. From 17 January to 28 August 1977, the news program was preceded by the nightly journalistic study program presented by Luisella Berrino, entitled Montecarlo Sera. Furthermore, from 1980 to 1982, a short news program lasting about a quarter of an hour, Monte-Carlo News, was broadcast.

From 1976 to 1980, engineer Henri de France participated in the creation and operation of the Télé Monte Carlo repeater network in Italy. From 1978 to 1980, the network had TV presenter and author Paolo Limiti as programming director, responsible for creating several programs, including the cooking show Telemenù, hosted by Wilma De Angelis. The program was later renamed Sale, pepe e fantasia (Salt, Pepper and Fantasy). In 1979, Sandra Mondaini also joined the Monegasque channel with a variety program Stasera mi sento milionaria, in prime time. In 1980, TV presenter Ettore Andenna became programming director, remaining in the position for a year. That year, some programs (produced in the Antenna 3 Lombardia studios, in Milan) started to be broadcast on the Monegasque network, such as the morning show Telemattina and the quiz Scusi, le faccio un assegno? shown in the early evening. Also in 1980, Gianfranco Funari debuted his own program, the nightly talk show Torti in faccia, recorded at the station's Milan branch.

In 1981, rumors arose of the intention of the French-Monegasque ownership of the Italian-language branch of Télé Monte Carlo to be put up for sale. This was confirmed in 1983, with the adoption of a new logo at the branch, to distinguish it from its French-speaking sister, after years of using a unified brand. In the station's logo, the spelling used was French, so the word Tele was written Télé, a script that, however, was never used by the Italian press. Also in the early years, when the opening signal of the Eurovision network appeared, the name that appeared was Radio Télé Monte Carlo or Radio Télévision de Monte Carlo, also known in Italian as Radio Televisione de Monte Carlo. With this, the network came to be called Tele Monte-Carlo.

On 18 March 1982, RAI acquired half of the network's share package, out of fear that Canale 5 would control the satellite available to Tele Monte-Carlo. This act soon caused misunderstandings that resulted in the Il Giornale editorial team leaving the network and the cancellation of Monte-Carlo news. There were, therefore, only two short news programs (Notizie Flash), reduced to just one in 1985. During this period, the network repeated some old RAI programs, such as Lascia o raddoppia?, Studio Uno and Discoring.

From the mid-eighties onwards, Tele Monte-Carlo, which until then had a good audience in Italy, gradually began to disappear from the television scene, due to the growth of large national private networks, mainly the Fininvest Group.

==== Globo administration ====
Logo used by the network between 1985 and 1995.

On 4 August 1985, 90% of the network was purchased by Organizações Globo, to which Rede Globo belongs. The remaining 10% remained owned by RAI. The direction of the channel was entrusted to Herbert Fiuza, who delegated the management of internal productions to Carlo Briani. From then on, the network's name began to be spelled Telemontecarlo, and the logo became the same as that used by the Brazilian network from 1981 to 1983.

With the arrival of Rede Globo, there was also the inauguration of TMC's new TV production center in Rome, at Piazza della Balduina, 48. Opened in 1986, it became Telemontecarlo's main studio (while the Monte Carlo and Milan branches had their functions increasingly reduced) and remained in operation until 1998. As a result of the purchase, several Brazilian programs were shown in an Italian version, such as the telenovelas Gabriela, Dancin' Days, Água Viva, Louco Amor, Pão Pão, Beijo-Beijo, Final Feliz, Selva de Pedra, Sinhá Moça, Cambalacho, Guerra dos Sexos, Terras do Sem-Fim and Roda de Fogo.

In addition to telenovelas, the network also aired miniseries and Brazilian TV series, such as Rabo de Saia, A Máfia no Brasil, Lampião e Maria Bonita, Anarquistas, Graças a Deus and Armação Ilimitada. At that time, some American TV shows for children were also shown, such as Get Smart, Batman, I misteri di Nancy Drew and Secrets and Mysteries. TMC also had in its programming the children's program Il paese della cuccagna, with studio jokes, games and anime, presented by Marina Perzy and Paolo Limiti and produced in Brazil. With regard to its own productions, Telemontecarlo had the talk show Specchio della vita, the TV Donna program, presented by Carla Urban, in addition to the consolidated cooking program Sale, pepe e fantasia.

The network's journalism also went through many changes at this stage, and in February 1986, under the direction of Ricardo Pereira, in partnership with Roberto Quintini, the TMC News television news program began to be produced. It was the first in Italy to be presented in a duo (alternating between a male journalist and a female journalist) and with camera movement, an innovation in Italian television journalism at the time. Some Brazilian journalists also worked on the network's team, such as José Altafini.

At that time, Telemontecarlo broadcast celebrations and events related to the Rio Carnival, and in the sports field, football matches for the Brazilian Championship and the Brazilian National Team were broadcast, in addition to Formula 1 races. The graphic part of the network had also been changed with the arrival of Rede Globo, adopting soundtracks and station bumpers from the Brazilian network. Most of the graphics were adapted in Rome by graphic designers such as Fiammetta Grasselli (who at the time was art director and responsible for the network's graphics sector), while most of the tracks were composed or rearranged by Silvio Amato.

In October 1987, Telemontecarlo's programming was removed from the air on its affiliates Canale 7 Roma and Canale 21 Roma, due to a legal challenge to the network's right to carry out live broadcasts in Italian territory made by the Fininvest group, of Silvio Berlusconi, who alleged that the Monegasque network had undue privileges. The determination was that the network should stop broadcasting live in Rome and the Lazio region.

The following were the affiliates TMC had before the passage of the Mammì law in 1990 that caused TMC to become a national network:

Station	Channel	City	Affiliation period	Current situation
Antenna Marche	—N/a	Ancona	1990	Defunct
Antenna Sicilia	41 UHF	Catania	1986–1990	Now independent
Telestars	57 UHF	Mongrassano	1986–1990	Defunct
Video Reporter	—N/a	Pescara	1986–1990	Defunct
TeleBolzano	39 UHF	Trento	1985–1990	Defunct
Telecolor	51 UHF	Cremona	1984–1990	Now independent
Video Spezia	56 UHF	La Spezia	1984–1990	Defunct
Canale 34 Telenapoli	34 UHF	Naples	1983–1990	Defunct
Canale 7 Roma	54 UHF	Castel del Piano	1983–1990	Defunct
Canale 21 Roma	21 UHF	Ciampino	1981–1990	Defunct
TGS2	50 UHF	Palermo	1986–1989	Now Tele Giornale di Sicilia, independent
Canale 6	32 UHF	Milan	1985–1989	Defunct
Canale Uno	28 UHF	Taranto	1984–1989	Defunct
Tele Radio Bologna	55 UHF	Bologna	1982–1989	Defunct
Telemondo 2000	42 UHF	Torrita di Siena	1981–1986	Defunct
Canale 55	55 UHF	Pisa	1982–1984	Defunct
TeleRomana	27 UHF	Rome	1982–1983	Defunct
Tele Frosinone	44 UHF	Frosinone	Unknown	Defunct

In 1990, due to the network's low audience and debts, Globo began to withdraw its shares from Telemontecarlo, transferring 40% of the channel's ownership to Montedison, led at the time by Raul Gardini.

Several celebrities, displaced by the main networks, were hired by Telemontecarlo, such as Luciano Rispoli, with the program Ho fatto 13 and Mino Damato, who from 1991 to 1992, presented the talk show I.T. – Incontri Televisivi, and Loretta Goggi, who at the same time presented the evening variety program Festa di compleanno.

Names that would become popular a few years later were also launched, such as Alessia Marcuzzi (host, together with Mauro Serio, of the children's program Amici mostri, from 1992 to 1993), Paola Perego, host of the program Settimo squillo, accompanied by actor Remo Girone. Perego also presented the health program Quando c'è la salute. Also during this period, newcomer Simona Ventura worked at the channel as a sports journalist. Also in 1992, Telemontecarlo covered part of the 1992 Summer Olympics, held in Barcelona.

From 1992 to 1993, the schedule was also filled with new programs such as La più bella sei tu and Tappeto Volante, with Luciano Rispoli (accompanied by Melba Ruffo), Verde Fazzuoli, by Federico Fazzuoli, and began a series of experimental programs targeting young people, produced by Lorenzo Torraca, such as T.R.I.B.U., with Gegè Telesforo, and The Lion Trophy Show, with Emily De Cesare.

The network's strong point, however, was sports broadcasts. Football (TMC could broadcast, as it was Monegasque and a member of Eurovision, the matches of the European Championship and World Cups, thus avoiding the exclusivity of RAI channels), the yacht races for the Copa América, and alpine skiing, whose World Cup and World Championship races were broadcast with commentary by Bruno Gattai. The biggest highlight of sports programming was Galagoal, a program that debuted in 1990 and had Alba Parietti and Massimo Caputi as presenters. Alba also presented, on Telemontecarlo, the variety program Tre donne intorno al coro, together with Athina Cenci and Susanna Agnelli, and the talk show Corpo a corpo.

In 1992, Telemontecarlo was one of the first private broadcasters in Italy to activate its own teletext service, TMCVideo.

In 1993, Sandro Curzi, former director of TG3 on Rai 3, was appointed director of TMC News.

==== Montedison administration ====
On 4 January 1994, Montedison (which was already controlled by Antonio Ferruzzi) completed the acquisition of Telemontecarlo, and appointed Emmanuele Milano (former director of Rai 1) to the role of general manager of the network. In the same year, journalist Corrado Augias was hired from RAI, who created a daily news section after TMC News and then an electronic culture and current affairs newsmagazine in prime time entitled Domino.

The network's limited coverage, combined with not very competitive and much reformulated programming, as well as an advertising market mostly controlled by Fininvest Group networks (Canale 5, Italia 1 and Rete 4) were the main problems of Montedison's management at Telemontecarlo, which did not achieve good results.

Globo's identity was used until January 1995.

==== Cecchi Gori administration ====
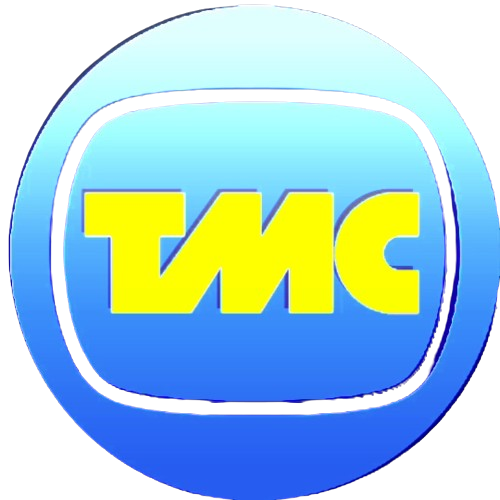
Logo of the transition period (1995)

On 20 July 1995, filmmaker and businessman Vittorio Cecchi Gori, through his company Cecchi Gori Group, after obtaining the consent of the authorities of the Principality of Monaco, purchased Telemontecarlo aiming to create, through Videomusic, another network owned by him, TMC 2, thus creating a third television group focused on breaking the duopoly of the RAI and Mediaset groups (Canale 5, Italia 1 and Rete 4). The new network was officially launched on 1 June 1996.

From 28 April 1996, Telemontecarlo's ratings began to be measured by Auditel.

Some well-known faces, such as Marco Balestri (with the sentimental talk show Strettamente personale), Jocelyn Hattab, who together with Sabrina Salerno and Simona Tagli presented the game show Il grande gioco del mercante in fiera, a new version of Il grande gioco dell'oca, another program presented by Jocelyn on Rai 2, Toto Cutugno (with the musical program Sei Forte), Gianfranco D'Angelo and Cinzia Leone, together with a team of comedians (with the program Retromarsh!!!, based on Italia 1's Drive In), Luciano Rispoli (with the variety program Tappeto Volante, one of the network's few major successes), and the youth program Generazione X, presented by Pierluigi Diaco. An afternoon slot dedicated to children was also created entitled Zap Zap (presented by Guido Cavalleri and Marta Iacopini, who previously presented Ciao Ciao), broadcast every day at 6 pm, which basically returned to showing various anime series previously broadcast on other networks. Still for children, the network also acquired the right to broadcast some of Cartoon Network's cartoons, which were included in a morning slot with the same name, presented by Emanuela Panatta and Beppe Rispoli.

However, the network's average audience did not reach (except in some cases) the expected levels, not even managing to consolidate the channel as the third largest on Italian TV. Furthermore, the problem of few retransmitters and the resulting limited territorial coverage of Telemontecarlo remained.

From 1996 to 1997, the network won the rights to the Italian Serie A football championship, taking them from RAI, but did not give Lega Calcio bank guarantees in time to guarantee payment of the rights. After a series of complaints and agreements, the broadcaster was able to broadcast, thanks to the unbundling of broadcasting rights on terrestrial TV, the championship goals from 7 pm to 8:30 pm. In football, however, an international trophy was broadcast: the African Cup of Nations.

The highlights of the sports programming of the period were Il Processo di Biscardi on Monday nights, migrated from TMC 2 to the main network, and Goleada (updated version of Galagol) with Massimo Caputi (also previously broadcast on TMC 2), in the first edition accompanied by Martina Colombari, in the second by Ela Weber and in the third by footballer and coach Carolina Morace.

On 12 February 1997, Telemontecarlo was the first private television network to broadcast an exclusive football match for the Italian team valid for the World Cup qualifiers, England vs Italy. In the autumn of 1997, Wilma De Angelis returned to the network, presenting a morning program entitled Due come voi, presented in a duo with Benedicta Boccoli.

On 7 April 1997, Antonio Lubrano agreed to be transferred to the network, becoming director of journalism at TMC and presenter of the daily program Candido. Biagio Agnes was appointed director of the channel, and despite putting the medical program Check up back on the schedule, renamed Check up-salute and presented by Annalisa Manduca, he was unable to revive TMC's uncompetitive programming. The network was entrusted to Rita Rusić, wife of the then owner Vittorio Cecchi Gori and a well-known film producer.

In autumn 1998, the programming was renewed again with the aim of directly reaching an audience profile. Thanks to this latest change in the editorial line, Telemontecarlo hired former RAI announcer Ilaria Moscato (for the morning program Casa, amore e fantasia) and makeup artist Diego Dalla Palma (for the program Questione di stile). Alain Elkann was promoted to host of the Sunday talk show, Il caffè della domenica. Rita Forte also became the presenter of the program Forte fortissima.

On 10 March 2000, at 11:10 pm, the first episode of the series Sex and the City with Sarah Jessica Parker aired, part of a women's talk show entitled Sesso, parlano le donne, presented by Anna Pettinelli.

In the same year, the Telemontecarlo branch in Monte Carlo was closed, as a result of the broadcaster's intention to transmit its signal from Italy. This resulted in the dismissal of all employees working in that branch. As a result, a protest was held, which caused TMC to go off the air on 30 May 2000 from 8:05 pm to 8:33 pm, displaying a slide that explained the reason for the interruption of transmissions:

"As part of the closure of the TMC branch in the Principality of Monaco, Cecchi Gori Group uses unacceptable means to dismiss all employees... It's unacceptable that the TMC "Monegasque network" can be broadcast outside of Monaco and that its transmission is carried out directly from Italy."

— Protest screen by Telemontecarlo employees that was displayed to protest the closure of the Monegasque branch.

Until the summer of that year, Telemontecarlo transmitted its signal directly from the offices in Milan and Rome, and sent it to the transmitter in the Monaco office, from where it then reached the Principality, southern France and Italy. This system served to maintain the legal status of foreign television, operating as a Monegasque channel. After that, the network was broadcast directly from Rome (nothing was produced in the Milan office) and began phasing out the Telemontecarlo name, gradually adopting the acronym TMC, officially becoming an Italian broadcaster.

The Monaco office remained open for a few more months due to the fact that the network broadcast UEFA Euro 2000 in the Belgium and the Netherlands.

==== Seat Pagine Gialle administration and conversion to La7 ====
On 6 August 2000, Cecchi Gori, a month and a half of long negotiations after the emergence of financial difficulties, sold TMC and TMC 2 to Seat Pagine Gialle, from Telecom Italia. The new owner decided that, to relaunch the network once and for all, it was necessary to adopt an entirely new form and name, to make it capable of competing with the main national channels of the time. The new company intended to target, as it had stated from the beginning, a young target for the relaunch of the network, and so Roberto Giovalli, former director of Italia 1, was appointed director.

At a press conference held on 3 May 2001, in the presence of director Ernesto Mauri and network manager Roberto Giovalli, it was officially announced that TMC would become LA7, and that the new network would be launched on 24 June.

A series of hires soon began for the new broadcaster, and the most important was that of Gad Lerner, former director of Rai 1's TG1, who on 6 June was appointed new director of TMC News. He was also entrusted with managing the sports newsroom at TMC Sport, and journalism at TMC 2, the latter role assumed on 18 June. Much was invested in the advertising campaign, with TV promos on both networks, as well as billboards in the streets. Also in the previous two months, every five minutes, the TMC logo briefly transitioned into the LA7 logo, then returning to the TMC logo.

On 24 June of that year, during the gala program Prima serata, presented by Fabio Fazio and Luciana Littizzetto, LA7 was officially launched through a symbolic gesture carried out at 10:35 pm, when the presenters made a live link at a viewer's home, asking her to press the 7 button on her remote control to stop the rotation of the logo, which began to rotate on the screen as the program began. From that moment on, TMC was officially extinguished and became LA7. However, the TMC logo was placed side by side with the new brand in the upper right corner of the screen, to gradually accustom the public to the new network's identification. The TMC logo remained up until midnight on 9 September of the same year.

Part of the Telemontecarlo collection became the property of LA7. The material corresponding to the 1974 to 1985 phase of TMC is still owned by Groupe TF1 (the company that owns the French TMC), and consequently, LA7 only has ownership of material produced from 1985 onwards.

=== La7 ===
Against the initial premises, like the hiring of popular TV hosts, anchors and journalists, La7's ratings and shares were much lower than its major competitors. However, in 2010–2011, the channel began doubling its rates, also thanks to current news director Enrico Mentana and his news programme TG La7.

On 4 March 2013, it was announced the acquisition by Urbano Cairo's Cairo Editore. The sale was effective from 30 April 2013.

In April 2026, La7 was involved in a controversy with the company Nvidia, since after the announcement of DLSS 5 by the Taiwanese company, the Italian network took down the video due to copyright. The case was solved within a few hours.

== Programmes ==
=== Talk shows ===
- Coffee Break, daily morning talk show hosted by Tiziana Panella and Enrico Vaime; weather reports are narrated by meteorologist Paolo Sottocorona;
- Piazzapulita, prime time political talk show directed by Corrado Formigli, airing every Thursday at 21:10 after Otto e mezzo;
- Propaganda Live every Friday night, created and hosted by Diego Bianchi and cartoonist Marco "Makkox" Dambrosio;

=== News programmes ===
- TG La7, main news programme, directed by Enrico Mentana;
- Omnibus, morning news block hosted by TG La7 anchorpersons Manuela Ferri, Edgardo Gulotta, Andrea Molino, Andrea Pancani and Alessandra Sardoni; weather forecasts are presented by meteorologist Paolo Sottocorona;
- Gli Intoccabili, with Gianluigi Nuzzi every Wednesday at 23:10;
- Otto e mezzo, access prime time information programme hosted by Lilli Gruber, airing every weekday at 20:35 after TG La7; in Summer time it is substituted by In Onda;
- In Onda access prime time information programme hosted by journalists Luca Telese and Marianna Aprile, airing every weekend at 20:35 after TG La7; in Summer time it substitutes Otto e mezzo every weekday;
- L'aria che tira, business programme hosted by David Parenzo;

=== Cultural programmes ===
- Atlantide – Storie di uomini e di mondi, main documentary evening block airing every weekday, hosted by Natasha Lusenti (now by Greta Mauro);
- Impero, hosted by Valerio Massimo Manfredi;
- Due minuti Un libro, book-related programme hosted by Alain Elkann;
- Prehistoric Park, documentary;
- Missione Natura, summertime nature programme, hosted by biologist and ornithologist Vincenzo Venuto, with the external intervention of herpetologist Austin Stevens.

=== TV series and miniseries ===
- A Touch of Frost
- The Borgias
- Charmed
- Cold Squad
- The Commish
- Crossing Jordan
- Dirt
- The District
- Due South
- F/X: The Series
- Grey's Anatomy
- Hustle
- In the Heat of the Night
- The Kennedys
- Leverage
- The L Word
- MacGyver
- Matlock
- Midsomer murders
- Mike Hammer
- Murder Call
- New Tricks
- Relic Hunter
- Remington Steele
- Saving Hope
- Sex and the City
- Sliders
- Star Trek: The Original Series
- Star Trek: Deep Space Nine
- Stargate SG-1
- The Practice
- This Is Wonderland
- Touched by an Angel
- Undercover Boss
- Unforgettable

=== Sports events ===
- America's Cup
- Coppa Italia matches
- Six Nations Championship
- Superbike World Championship
- Super Bowl
- Supercopa de España
- Superstars Series

=== Defunct Italian programmes ===
- Crozza Italia (known as Italialand in 2011), comedy show hosted by Maurizio Crozza, airing four episodes in May 2011 at 21:10;
- Cuochi e Fiamme, cooking talent show hosted by professional chef Simone Rugiati, with the collaboration of Fiammetta Fadda, Riccardo Rossi and Chiara Maci (as "judges"), airing every weekday (now on La7d);
- Fratelli e Sorelle d'Italia, comedy and historical show hosted by Veronica Pivetti with collaboration of Carlo Lucarelli, Ascanio Celestini, Paolo Hendel, Virginia Raffaele and Lillo & Greg, airing every Friday night at 21:10;
- La Gaia Scienza, scientific comedy show hosted by geologist Mario Tozzi and the comedian group Trio Medusa (1 season);
- Victor Victoria, late night weekday show hosted by Victoria Cabello, Geppi Cucciari, singer Arisa and MelissaP (4 seasons);
- Stargate – Linea di Confine, documentary series, replaced by Impero (9 seasons);
- Exit, prime time talk hosted by Ilaria D'Amico (5 seasons);
- Niente di Personale, hosted by Antonello Piroso;
- Tetris, prime time talk show hosted by Luca Telese (2 seasons);
- I Fantastici 5, Italian version of Queer Eye for the Straight Guy (1 season);
- Markette, late night weekday show hosted by Piero Chiambretti (2 seasons);
- 100%, game show hosted by Gigio D'Ambrosio (1 season). It has been the only game show aired by La7 so far;
- Altra Storia, history deepening programme (5 seasons);
- Il Processo di Biscardi, sport review programme hosted by Aldo Biscardi (now moved on 7 Gold Channel);
- Wife Swap (4 seasons, now on Fox Life and Cielo);
- Il Contratto, hosted by Sabrina Nobile, aired until April 2011 every Wednesday at 21:10.
- G'Day with Geppi Cucciari, evening comedy show, airing at 19:20 every weekday;
- (ah)iPiroso with Antonello Piroso, former La7 News & Sports director, and former tennis player Adriano Panatta, and writer Fulvio Abbate; It airs every weekday (late night show);
- 25a Ora – Il Cinema Espanso (hosted by Davide Dileo, founder of Subsonica). It airs at about midnight on Fridays and Saturdays;
- Italialand Nuove attrazioni, comedy show hosted by Maurizio Crozza, airing every Friday at 21:10;
- I Menù di Benedetta, cooking show hosted by Benedetta Parodi, airing at 12:25 every weekday;
- Interno Giorno, afternoon movie block, airing old Italian and US movies every weekday at 14:00;
- La Valigia dei Sogni, weekend and summer late-night movie block. The movie is introduced by Simone Annichiarico; from July to August 2011. It will be airing on Monday nights at 21:10;
- Ma anche no, an Italian entertainment television news programme hosted by Antonello Piroso, airing every Sunday at 14:05;
- Chef per un Giorno, celebrity cooking talent show hosted by professional chefs Sergio Maria Teutonico, Maurizio Di Mario, Velia De Angelis and Alessio Pizzi, airing every weekend;
- Le Invasioni Barbariche, hosted by Daria Bignardi;
- L'Infedele, Monday night review with Gad Lerner.
