= 1987 in Italian television =

This is a list of Italian television related events from 1987.

== Events. ==
=== RAI ===
- 7 February. The Sanremo Festival, won by the trio Morandi, Tozzi and Ruggeri and hosted by Pippo Baudo, gets an audience of 18.300.000 spectators (3 TV viewers on 4), an absolute record in the history of the singing event. The show is marked by an incident of the guest singer Patsy Kensit, who accidentally shows a naked breast on air. It is also marked by Claudio Villa’s death, announced by Baudo during the final evening.
- 20 February. Enzo Tortora comes back to television, four years after his arrest, with a new season of Portobello. Greeted with a standing ovation, he answers with a quip (“Well, where were we?”), then he thanks the public for their solidarity towards him during his judiciary troubles.
- 5 March. Reorganization of RAI, giving to each of the three great parties (DC, PSI and PCI) the control of a channel. RAI 3 (till then a cultural channel, for a niche audience) is greatly potentiated and put under the direction of the communist Angelo Guglielmi; TG3 is separated from the TGR (regional news) and trusted to Sandro Curzi (former journalist of Radio Prague).
- 26 April: Sergio Zavoli is the first Western journalist to visit the Chernobyl nuclear power plant in the first anniversary of the disaster.
- 10 July. Adriano Celentano signs a contract with RAI for the conduction of Fantastico 8, under conditions of exceptional favor (the artistic direction and 3 billion liras, more other money by the sponsors). The show will be one of the most controversial in the history of Italian television.
- 28 August-6 September: RAI is the oficial televisión for the World Championship of Athletics in Rome.
- 4 September: 14.084.000 TV viewers follow Madonna's concert, broadcast by RAI 1 from the Turin Olympic stadium; it is the second highest rating of the year, after the Sanremo festival.
- 7 November.At the eve of the 1987 Italian referendum, Adriano Celentano, from the Fantastico’s stage, rails against hunting and invites the audience to write on the voting paper “Chase is against love” (forgetting that such act would invalidate the vote). Although he retracts almost immediately, the outburst causes a trial against him and a fine of 200 million liras. This is only the most sensational of Celentano's provocations. In other episodes of the show, he asks the public to turn off the TV or to change the channel. Other controversies are aroused by the monologues of Franca Rame (who describes crudely her rape) and Dario Fo (an irreverent retelling of the Gospel).

=== Fininvest ===
- 20 March: Pippo Baudo and Raffaella Carrà, the two greatest Italian TV stars, pass from RAI to Fininvest, signing generous exclusive contracts (for Baudo, 20 billion liras and the chair of artistic director; for Carrà, 8 billion liras); later, they are imitated by other two popular figures as Enrica Bonaccorti and Milly Carlucci. In spite of this sensational “shopping campaign” by Fininvest, in the following season RAI maintains the primacy of viewings and the four newcomers’ shows on Canale 5 are flops.
- 21 March: “night of the spots”. Provocatively, Canale 5 broadcasts four uninterrupted hours of American commercials from midnight to dawn, interrupted only by a few clips of famous films.
- 14 June: 1987 Italian general election. For the first time, Canale 5 takes part in the electoral campaign with tribunes and political programs (but broadcast only in the late evening).
- 4 October: birth of Italia 7, a syndication of local stations, managed (also if not directly owned) by Fininvest, that provides the programs and the publicity; it's meant as a channel for the male public. The 24 November, Fininvest gets the control also of TeleCapodistria, that specializes in sport events.
- 15 October: the young actor Nick Novecento dies precociously for a heart attack. Fininvest, with a very controversial decision, chooses to still air the registered episodes of the Maurizio Costanzo show where the deceased appeared as commentator.

=== Minor channels. ===
- 5 September: end of the syndication Euro TV, splitting in two separate network: Odeon TV (that begins broadcasting the day after) and Italia 7 (starting in October, see over). Odeon TV, owned by two businessmen near to the DC (Callisto Tanzi and Edoardo Longarini) in the following years tries unsuccessfully to become the “third pole” of Italian TV, after RAI and Fininvest.
- 7 September: Rete A is the first private channel to air a national newscast, directed by Emilio Fede.
- 21 December: birth of Padre Pio TV, owned by the San Giovanni in Rotondo Capuchins and aimed to the devotees of the friar.

== Awards ==
4. Telegatto Award, for the season 1986–1987.

- Man and woman of the year: Pippo Baudo and Enrica Bonaccorti.
- Best TV movie: La voglia di vincere (for Italy) and North and South (for abroad).
- Best serial: I ragazzi della 3. C (for Italy) and Dallas (for abroad).
- Best miniseries: Mino il piccolo alpino.
- Best spot: yogurt Yomo, with Beppe Grillo.
- Best quiz: Pentatlon.
- Best variety: Drive In.
- Best talk show: Domenica In
- Best educational: Il mondo di Quark.
- Best magazine: Il fatto.
- Best music show: 37. Sanremo Festival.
- Best sport magazine: La domenica sportiva.
- Best show for children: Bim bum bam.
- Awards for the foreign TV: Maxwell Caufield (USA), Michel Drucker (France), Julia Smith (UK), Josè Luis Moreno (Spain), Horst Tappert and Hanna Schygulla (Germany).
- Special awards: Mrs. Annalisa Galbiati (reader of Sorrisi e canzoni TV), Capitol (for having reached 1281 episodes), Corrado Maltoni, Raimondo Vianello and Sandra Mondaini (for the 25 years of career), Fantastico 7 (for the highest rating).

== Debuts ==
=== Rai ===
==== Variety ====
- Mezzogiorno è... (Noon is...) – mix of variety and talk show hosted on RAI 2 by Gianfranco Funari; it's for three seasons the most followed program of the lunch hour. In spite of its public success, in 1990, for an interview by Funari to the PRI secretary Giorgio La Malfa unwelcome to the PSI (that has the control of RAI 2) the show is deleted and the presenter moved away from RAI.
- Harem – feminist talk-show, hosted by Catherine Spaak, with three female guests and a male one, who only intervenes at the end; 15 seasons.
- Magazine 3 – at the beginning an anthology of the RAI 3's best, it later became a talk-show with Oreste De Fornari and Daniele Luttazzi; lasted till 2002.
- Biberon, with the Bagalino troupe (Pippo Franco, Oreste Lionello, Leo Gullotta), lasted 3 seasons. In this show of political satire (but the mockery is, really, very tame and obsequious) an average family meets the doubles of the most known politicians.
- D.O.C.: Musica e altro a denominazione d'origine controllata (CDO: music and more with a controlled designation of origin) – musical show, centered on jazz and authorial song, hosted by Renzo Arbore.
- Il milionario (The millionaire) – game show with Jocelyn Hattab.
- Va’ pensiero (Go, mind) – interstitial program of the Sunday afternoon, with Andrea Barbato, Galeazzo Benti and Oliviero Beha.
- Porto matto (Crazy port) – show of the summer.
- Patatrac – show for children of the morning.
- Big! – interstitial program for children of the afternoon, with cartoons.

==== News and educational ====
- Mixer cultura (Mixer culture) – talk show hosted by Arnaldo Bagnasco, that applies the formula of the infotainment to the cultural actuality.
- Samarcanda (Samarkand) – controversial talk show hosted by Michele Santoro, praised as an example of brave journalism, not fearing thorny questions as Mafia and Mani pulite, but also charged of demagogy and factionalism (the conductor doesn't hide his leftist sympathies).
- Telefono giallo (The yellow phone) – crime magazine, hosted by Corrado Augias; 3 season. The show re-enacts unsolved crimes, often with political implications; sensational is the episode about the Itavia Flight 870, with the revelations of an anonymous by phone.
- Diogene – TG2 column in defense of the rights of citizens and consumers, hosted by Mario Pastore and Antonio Lubrano.
- Il caso hosted by Enzo Biagi; 2 seasons.
- Cinema! – cinema magazine, care of Francesco Bortolini and Claudio Masenza.
- Viaggio intorno all’uomo (Travel around the man) – cycle of films followed by a debate about social questions, hosted by Sergio Zavoli; 3 seasons.

=== Fininvest ===
==== Serials ====
- I ragazzi della 3. C. (The 3C boys) – 3 seasons; directed by Claudio Risi, script by the Vanzina brothers. The serial, remembered also for its unprejudiced product placements, mildly satirizes the mores of the Italian middle-class youth, through the life of some teen-agers, schoolmates in a Roman high school. It gets an unexpected success and it's now considered a time capsule of the Eighties.

==== Variety ====
- Caffelatte (Coffee with milk) – cartoon show.
- Candid camera – lasted till 2008 and hosted, among others, by Gerry Scotti and Paolo Bonolis.
- Tra moglie e marito – Italian version of The newlywed game, hosted by Marco Columbro; five seasons.
- Telemike – quiz show with Mike Bongiorno.
- Tu come noi (You like us) - show about the live of ordinary people, hosted by Pippo Baudo.

==== News and educational ====
- Tivù Tivù – news magazine hosted by Arrigo Levi.

=== Minor channels ===
- Colpo grosso (Jackpot) (Europa 7) – sexy game, where the plays are just a pretest to undress female dancers and contenders; hosted by Umberto Smaila; 5 seasons. Infamous for its bad taste, the show gets the same an audience of two million viewers, becomes a cultural phenomenon and is largely imitated abroad.
- Baby show (Junior TV) – show for children, produced by Baby Records.
- La ruota della fortuna (Odeon TV) – Italian version of Wheel of fortune; becomes a national success after having transmigrated on the Fininvest channels, where is trusted to Mike Bongiorno, Enrico Papi, and Gerry Scotti; 22 seasons (by now).
- Forza Italia (Come on, Italy) (Odeon TV) – sport magazine, hosted by Walter Zenga.
- Qui studio, a voi stadio (Studio calls Stadium) (Telelombardia) – football magazine, with Fabio Ravezzani; it is again now one of the most popular sport program in Italy, even if broadcast by a local channel.

=== International ===
- (United States) Perry Mason (RAI 2)
- (Germany) The Black Forest clinic (RAI 3)

== Television shows ==
=== RAI ===
==== TV-movies ====
- Le lunghe ombre (The long shadows) by Gianfranco Mingozzi, with Lina Sastri; coming-of-age story, set in the Second World War.
- Un’australiana a Roma (An Australian girl in Rome) by Sergio Martino; the sad love story between an Australian tourist (Nicole Kidman, by then unknown outside her country) and an Italian disabled boy (Massimo Ciavarro).
- Ellepi – by Roberto Malenotti, with Massimo Ghini and Janis Lee; four undergraduates passionate about music record their first disk.
- Assicurazione sulla morte (Death insurance) – noir by Carlo Lizzani, from James Hadley Chase’s Tell it to the birds, with Patricia Millardet; Italo-French coproduction.

==== Miniseries ====
- Il generale (The general) – by Luigi Magni, in 4 episodes; historically accurate biopic about Giuseppe Garibaldi, with Franco Nero as protagonist, sided by a stellar cast (Erland Joshephson as Cavour, Jacques Perrin as Vittorio Emanuele II, Flavio Bucci as Mazzini).
- Treasure Island in outer space – ideated by Renato Castellani and directed, after his death, by Antonio Margheriti, sci-fi version of the Stevenson’s novel; with the young Itaco Nardulli as Jim, Anthony Quinn as Long John Silver and Ernest Borgnine as Billy Bones. One of the most expensive RAI production (25 billion liras), it's a flop in Italy, while outside gets a relative success and inspires Disney's Treasure planet.
- Voglia di vincere (Desire to win) – by Vittorio Sindoni, in 3 episodes, with Gianni Morandi and Catherine Spaak; sport melodrama about the World Rally Championship.
- Little Roma – by Francesco Massaro, in 10 episodes, with Ferruccio Amendola; the life in a popular district of the Italian capital.
- Nel gorgo del peccato (In the sin's vortex) – by Andrea and Antonio Frazzi, in 2 episodes, with Edvige Fenech and Gastone Moschin; crime story.
- Cinque storie inquietanti (Five unsettling stories) – by Carlo Di Carlo, from the Stanley Ellin's tales.
- Nessuno torna indietro (Nobody comes back) – by Franco Giraldi, from the Alba de Cespedes' feminist novel, set in a girls college under the fascism, with Federica Moro and Anne Parillaud; 4 episodes.

The success of La piovra pushes RAI to exploit the vein of the stories about organized crime, with three miniseries in a year.

- La piovra 3 – by Luigi Perelli, in 7 episodes, with Michele Placido and Giuliana De Sio; debut of the main villain of the cycle, the icy boss Tano Cariddi, played by Remo Girone.
- L’ombra nera del Vesuvio (The Vesuvius's dark shadow) – by Steno, in 4 episodes, with Carlo Giuffrè and Massimo Ranieri, about the Neapolitan camorra.
- Un siciliano in Sicilia (A Sicilian in Sicily) – by Pino Passalacqua, in 3 episodes, script by Andrea Camilleri, with James Russo and Vincent Gardenia; set in Sicily after the Allied invasion.

==== Serials ====
- Due assi per un turbo (Two aces for a turbo) – in 12 episodes; international co-production, with Renato D’Amore and Christian Fremont as two adventurous truckers.

==== Variety ====
- Fantastico 8 – hosted by Adriano Celentano, sided by “the four worst in the world” (Marisa Laurito, Massimo Boldi, Heather Parisi and Maurizio Micheli). Celentano transforms the traditional Saturday evening spectacle in a happening, based on the absolute improvisation and the provocation. The show, also if gets very high ratings, is ravaged by critics and causes also political controversies (see over).
- Indietro tutta (Full speed back) – hosted by Renzo Arbore and Nino Frassica, demented and exasperated parody of the Italian television's trends by then, as the quiz without cultural value, the undressed female dancers (the “cluck cluck girls”, attired as chickens) and the publicity's invasiveness. The show, to which Massimo Troisi too takes part by phone, sees the debuts of Maria Grazia Cucinotta and Paola Cortellesi (who sings one of the tracks).
- Bella d’estate (Nice in summer) – musical show, hosted by Ramona Dell’Abate, with Walter Chiari.
- Canzonissime – musical show celebrating the centenary of the phonograph record; Effetto Non Stop, dieci anni dopo (Non stop effect, ten years later) – show celebrating the decennial of Non stop; and Ieri, Goggi, domain (Yesterday, Goggi and tomorrow), magazine; all hosted by Loretta Goggi.
- La fabbrica dei sogni (The dreams’ factory) – game show among the Italian regions, hosted by Alessandro Benvenuti; it's the first variety aired on RAI 3.
- La grande corsa (The big race) and La grande occasione (The big chance) – game shows inspired, respectively, by Italian geography and economy, both hosted by Luciano Rispoli.
- Immagina (Imagine) – variety on the topic of fantasy, hosted by Edwige Fenech, and shot in high definition.
- Marisa la nuit – anthological show with the material coming from the RAI teche, hosted by Marisa Laurito
- Per chi suona la campanella (For whom the bluebell sounds) – variety, with the troupe of Il Bagaglino.
- Proffimamente non stop – with Simona Marchini.
- Pronto, Topolino? (Hello, Mickey Mouse?) and Pronto, è la RAI? (Hello, RAI?) – shows resuming the formula of Pronto, Raffaella, hosted by Giancarlo Magalli.

==== News and educational ====
- Giallo (Crime) – crime report magazine, hosted by Enzo Tortora in his last appearance in TV. Dario Argento contributes to the show producing two series of shorts (Gli incubi di Dario Argento, Dario Argento's nightmares, directed by himself, and Turno di notte, Night shift, by Lamberto Bava and Luigi Cozzi).
- Linea rovente (Burning line) – talk show hosted by Giuliano Ferrara, one of the first Italian examples of infotainment (the interviews have the form of a symbolic trial).
- Campioni, le più belle partite della nostra vita (Champions, the nicest matches of our life) – with Enzo Biagi, Gianni Minà and Andrea Barbato; commented replays of historical football matches.

=== Fininvest ===
==== TV-movies ====
- Nontuttorosa (Not just romance) by Armanzio Todini, with Marisa Laurito; rom-com with a writer of romance and her guardian angel as protagonists.
- Parole e baci (Words and kisses) by Rossella and Simona Izzo, with Simona Izzo and Ricky Tognazzi and Portami la luna (Take me the moon) by Carlo Cotti, with Mara Venier, John Steiner and Sabrina Ferilli; both chronicles of marital crisis.
- Provare per credere (Seeing is believing) - sexy comedy by Sergio Martino, with the telemarketer Guido Angeli in the role of a playboy.
- La familia Brandacci by Sergio Martino, with Silvio Spaccesi; Italian version of Father of the bride.

==== Miniseries ====
- Professione vacanze (Profession holidays) – by Vittorio De Sisti, ideated and interpreted by Jerry Calà, who plays the goofy and womanizer director of a resort; it's one of the first successes of the fiction by Fininvest.
- Licia dolce Licia (Licia sweet Licia) and Teneramente Licia (Tenderly Licia), with Cristina D’Avena; sequels to Love me Licia.

==== Variety ====
- Che piacere averti qui (What a pleasure to have you here) – with Paolo Villaggio.
- Ciao Enrica (Hi, Enrica) – talk show with Enrica Bonaccorti.
- Festival – hosted by Pippo Baudo; meant as the Fininvest's answer to Fantastico, it's an unforeseen flop, also because the excessive amount of publicity, so to induce Baudo to terminate the contract with the company.
- La giostra (The carousel) – interstitial program of the Sunday afternoon, hosted by Enrica Bonaccorti.
- Lupo solitario (Wolfman Jack) – ideated by Antonio Ricci, hosted by Patrizio Roversi and Suzy Blady; experimental and demented variety, very appreciated by Umberto Eco who call it “the variety of the future”.
- SandraRaimondo show – with Raimondo Vianello and Sandra Mondaini, who celebrate on stage their silver noces.
- Dee Jay beach – musical show of the summer.
- Benvenuta Raffaella (Welcome, Raffaella Carrà); the showgirl makes her debut in Canale 5 with a backstage of the Raffaella Carrà show, aired later;

=== Minor channels ===
- Villaggio party (Odeon TV) – variety with Paolo Villaggio.

== Ending this year ==
- A boccaperta
- Il bingoo
- Pentatlon
- Portobello
- Record
- Tandem
- Casa Cecilia

== Channels ==
=== New channels ===
- Eden TV

== Deaths ==
- 1 February: Alessandro Blasetti (86), movie and TV director.
- 7 February: Claudio Villa (61), singer.
