= 1985 in Italian television =

This is a list of Italian television related events from 1985.

== Events ==
- In 1985, Italian television broadcasts over half a million commercials and advertising occupies 16 percent of the hours of transmission. An agreement between RAI, Fininvest and advertisers to limit publicity crowding does not substantially change the situation.

=== RAI ===
- 9 February: Ricchi e Poveri win the Sanremo Music Festival, hosted by Pippo Baudo, with Se m'innamoro.
- 17 May: RAI breaks the "midnight wall" (the traditional end time of broadcasts) by airing erotic auteur films (including In the realm of the sensess) at half past one.
- 29 May: millions of spectators, waiting for the 1985 European Cup final, see live the Heysel disaster, with the death of 39 Italian supporters. The RAI commentator Bruno Pizzul, clearly dismayed but with great professionalism, reports first of the tragedy and then of the match that is played anyway.
- 11 June: Andy Luotto leaves Quelli della note where he played Sheikh Harmand (an Arab weatherman portrayed in a caricatured and, for some, racist way) after receiving death threats from Islamic fundamentalists. The character had already aroused the official protests of Italian Muslim associations. The actor returns, in European clothes, in the last two episodes of the show.
- 14 September: Enzo Tortora is sentenced to ten years in prison for association with the Camorra and drug trafficking. The presenter, while continuing to proclaim his innocence, waives his immunity as a Member of the European Parliament and is placed under house arrest on 29 December.
- 1 December: the journalis Mino Damato, host of Domenica in, performs live a walk on hot coals.
- 28 December: RAI 3 celebrates the 90th anniversary of the cinematograph with La magnifica ossessione, a 40 hours marathon of movies, care of Enrico Ghezzi. The initiative will be repeated in 1995 for the centenary.

=== Fininvest ===
- 4 February: the Senate, with the decisive vote of MSI, approves the "Berluconi decree"; private televisions get the right to broadcast on a national scale, but not live.
- Fininvest, although it always bases its schedule on variety and American fictions, begins to produce information programs and Italian fictions.

=== Other private televisions ===
- 18 February: birth of Junior TV, syndication of local channels, specialized in anime and show for children.
- 4 August : the Brazilian Rede Globo buys the majority of Telemontecarlo’s shares.

== Awards ==
2. Telegatto Award, for the season 1984–1985

- Best shows: Pronto, Raffaella?, Zig Zag
- Best movie in TV: Raiders of the lost ark.
- Best miniseries: Christopher Columbus, Cuore, Quei 36 gradini (for Italy), Quo vadis?, V (for abroad)
- Best serial: Orazio (for Italy), Dallas, Dynasty, Hotel (for abroad).
- Best soap opera: Los ricos también lloran.
- Best telenovela: Chega mais.
- Best quiz: Il pranzo è servito, Superflash.
- Best game show: Ok il prezzo è giusto, M’ama non m’ama.
- Best variety: Ci pensiamo lunedì, Domenica in, Drive in, Fantastico 5, Quo vadiz? Risatissima, Il tastomatto, W le donne.
- Best talk show: Aboccaperta, Maurizio Costanzo show.
- Best educational: Jonathan, dimensione avventura, Quark.
- Best magazine: Bit, Italia sera, Nonsolomoda.
- Best music show: Dee Jay Television, Festivalbar, Sanremo music festival.
- Best sport magazine: Il processo del lunedì, Record.
- Best features: Trent’anni della nostra storia, Linea diretta.
- Best TV commentary: Miss World 1984, on Canale 5.
- Special award as best journalist: Giorgio Bocca.

== Debuts ==
=== RAI ===
==== Serials ====
- Aeroporto internazionale (International airport) – first attempt of long-lasting Italian serial, ideated by Ennio De Concini, directed by Paolo Poeti, with Adolfo Celi (as the good-hearted director of a terminal), Orazio Orlando and Dalila Di Lazzaro; 2 seasons.

==== Variety ====
- Parola mia (My word) – quiz about the Italian language, hosted by Luciano Rispoli, sided by Anna Carlucci and the university professor Gian Luigi Beccaria; 3 seasons plus a reprisal in 2002. It is a rare example of a TV quiz with a true cultural value.
- Pronto, chi gioca? – new edition of Pronto, Raffaella?, with Enrica Bonaccorti, and later Giancarlo Magalli, in the place of Raffaella Carrà; 2 seasons.

==== News and educational ====
- Un giorno in pretura (A day in the tribunal; in the first two seasosna, In pretura) – hosted by Roberta Petrelluzzi; again on air. TV reality program, which broadcasts, without commentary, the sessions of the trials; initially dedicated to small criminal cases, later it brought historic judicial affairs (such as the crimes of the Monster of Florence) or political ones (such as the trials for Tangentopoli) to the homes of Italians.
- Linea diretta – daily in-depth magazine hosted by Enzo Biagi and aired in the late evening; it is inaugurated by an interview to Mehmet Ali Acga.
- Il mercato del sabato (Saturday market) – magazine about economy and citizens' rights, hosted by Luisa Rivelli, among the first Rai programs of the morning time slot; 8 seasons.

=== Fininvest ===
==== Variety ====
- Forum – court show, with various hosts, all female (Catherine Spaak, Rita dalla Chiesa, Barbara Palombelli); the civil cases are settled by a true magistrate (the most famous is Santi Licheri, who kept the role for 24 years) while, often, the contenders are played by actors. The show, again on air, is one of the most popular Mediaset programs and has generated several spin-offs.
- Grand Hotel – mix of variety and sit-com set in a luxury hotel, ideated by Silvio Berlusconi himself, with Daniele Formica, Paolo Villaggio, Franco and Ciccio, Gigi e Andrea and several guest stars playing themselves (the first is Alain Delon); 2 seasons.
- Buona domenica (Good Sunday) – interstitial show of the Sunday evening, hosted by Maurizio Costanzo, Lorella Cuccarini and others; 20 seasons.

===== Game shows =====
- Doppio slalom (Double slalom) – quiz for teenagers, Italian version of Blockbusters, hosted by Corrado Tedeschi; 6 seasons. In 1988, the future politician Matteo Salvini (by then 15 years old) is champion of the show for three episodes.
- C’est la vie – game show, from the ABC's format That's life!, hosted by Marco Columbro, then by Umberto Smaila; 5 seasons.
- Il gioco delle coppie (The couples' game), Italian version of The Dating Game, hosted by Marco Pedrolin and others; 10 seasons.
- Il buon paese – game show, hosted by Claudio Lippi, with the challenge between two families representing two Italian villages; 2 seasons.
- Pentatlon - quiz hosted by Mike Bongiorno; 2 seasons.

==== News and educational ====
- Le frontiere dello spirito (Spirit's borders) – religious magazine, hosted by Claudio Sorgi and later by Gianfranco Ravasi; lasted till 2017.
- Big bang, lo spettacolo della vita (The show of the life) – popular science program, hosted by Jas Gawronski; 5 seasons.
- Parlamento in – political magazine, hosted by Rita Dalla Chiesa, Emilio Carelli and others; lasted till 2003.

=== Other private channels ===
- Hot line - musical show (Videomusic); till 1992.
- Pegaso kid – show of cartoon (moreover Hungarian) (Telemontecarlo).

== Shows of the year ==
=== RAI ===
==== Drama ====
- Il minestrone by Sergio Citti, with Roberto Benigni, Franco Citti and Ninetto Davoli, in 3 episodes; a shortened theatrical version had been distributed in 1981.
- The two lives of Mattia Pascal – by Mario Monicelli, from Luigi Pirandello's The late Mattia Pascal, with Marcello Mastroianni, Flavio Bucci and Laura Morante; in 2 parts.
- Un caso d’incoscienza (An incoscience case) - by Emidio Greco, with Erland Josephson and Rudiger Vogler; inspired by the life of Ivan Krueger.
- La famiglia Ceravolo by Melo Ferri, from his novel, with Tuti Ferro..

==== Miniseries ====
- Mussolini and I, by Alberto Negrin, with Bob Hoskins (Benito Mussolini), Anthony Hopkins (Galeazzo Ciano) and Susan Sarandon (Edda Ciano), 3 episodes. The serial arouses controversies for the given image of the fascism, judged too benevolent, and for the disappointing Bob Hoskins' performance.
- Sogni e bisogni (Dreams and needs) – by Sergio Citti, with a stellar cast (from Paolo Villaggio to Ugo Tognazzi). A cycle of "modern fairy tales", feel-good stories but in a paradoxical key, with a fantastic frame, where an angel, a devil and the destiny (Giulietta Masina) seek the book with the future of people.
- Voglia di cantare (Desire to sing) – by Vittorio Sindoni, with Gianni Morandi (in the autobiographical role of a singer searching for a relaunch) and Capucine; 4 episodes.
- Olga e i suoi figli – by Salvatore Nocita, with Annie Girardot; story of a widow and her schizophrenic son.

===== Mystery =====
- A viso coperto (Face covered) – drama about Anonima sarda, by Gianfranco Albano, with Ray Lovelock, Marlene Jobert and Nino Castelnuovo; 4 episodes.
- Un uomo in trappola (A trapped man) – thriler by Vittorio De Sisti, with Ugo Pagliai, Elena Sofia Ricci and Massimo Lopez; 4 episodes.
- Un foro nel parabrezza (An hole in the windscreen) – by Sauro Scavolini, from the Carlo Bernari's novel, with Vittorio Mezzogiorno and Mismy Farmer; 3 episodes. The life of a journalist is upstet by the encounter with a mysterious woman.

===== Period dramas =====
- Il corsaro (The rover) – by Franco Giraldi, from the Joseph Conrad novel, with Philippe Leroy, Ingrid Thulin and Laura Morante; 3 episodes.
- Quo vadis? – by Franco Rossi, from the Henryk Sienkiewicz's novel, with Francesco Quinn, Marie Therese Relin and Klaus Maria Brandauer (very appreciated in the Nero's role); European coproduction in 6 episodes.
- Christopher Columbus by Alberto Lattuada, with Gabriel Byrne in the title role and a stellar cast in the minor ones (Oliver Reed as Martin Pinzon, Faye Dunaway as Isabella of Castille, Max von Sydow and Eli Wallach); 4 episodes.
- Antonio Petito, artista comico – biopic by Gennaro Magliulo, with Mario Scarpetta in the title role.

==== Serial ====
- Caccia al ladro d’autore (Author's hunt for the thief)- with Giuliano Gemma, as the leader of a carabinieri unit specialized in the recovery of stolen artworks.

==== Variety ====
- Il tastomatto (The crazy key) – variety by Enzo Trapani, focused on the parody of the channel surfing; with Pippo Franco, Albano and Romina and, for the first time in television, the trio Anna Marchesini-Tullio Solenghi-Massimo Lopez.
- Quelli della notte (The night people) – variety by Renzo Arbore. The program, often improvised on air, is a demented parody of the talk-shows with absurd guests (the friar Nino Frassica, the Arab Andy Luotto, the communist Maurizio Ferrini, and so on); aired at the 11 p.m. and thought for a niche audience, it gets an extraordinary public and critic success and becomes a cultural phenomenon.
- Buonasera, Raffaella – variety with Raffaella Carrà, evening version of the successful noon program Pronto, Raffaella, in 15 episodes (the last five are broadcast by satellite form the RAI Corporation studios in New York). The show gets high rating but arouses also harsh quarrels and a parliamentary question for the huge costs of the trip to America.
- Pomeridiana – talk-show providing for the intervention via phone of the public at home; ideated and hosted by Luciano Rispoli.
- Cinecittò Cinecittà, by Vittorio De Sisti, with Vittorio Gassman, Jane Birkin and many famous actors and directors as guest stars, from Sergio Reggiani to Marcello Mastorianni;; and Passione mia (My passion), hosted by Monica Vitti, directed by Roberto Russo; both tributes to Cinecittà and the Italian cinema.
- Shaker, videococktail – directed by Vito Molinari, with Renzo Montagnani and Daniela Poggi.
- Supersera – with Alida Chelli and Enzo Garinei.

==== For children ====
- Magic – hosted by Piero Chiambretti.
- Pane e marmellata (Bread and jam) – hosted by Fabrizio Frizzi and Rita Dalla Chiesa.

==== News and educational ====
- AIDS story - reportage by Giangi Poli about the spread of AIDS in the United States.
- Serata Manzoni (Manzoni soirée) – talk show hosted by Beniamino Placido, for the 200th anniversary of the writer's birth.
- Laurel & Hardy, due teste senza cervello (Laurel and Hardy, two brainless heads) – documentary by Giancarlo Governi; 12 episodes.
- Mister O – program about parapsychology, hosted by Alessandro Cecchi Paone.

=== Fininvest ===
==== Fiction ====
- Doppio misto - trash comedy by Sergio Martino, with Gigi e Andrea and Moana Pozzi.
- Yesterday, vacanze al mare by Claudio Risi, with Massimo Ciavarro and Mauro Di Francesco; a group of friends remember their holidays on the Romagna Riviera.

==== Variety ====
- Zodiaco – quiz inspired by the astrological signs, hosted by Claudio Cecchetto and Jerry Scotti.

=== Other private channels ===
- Pop shop - music show ideated by Nelson Motta (Telemontecarlo).
- Felicità, dove sei? -first telenovela by Italian production, with Veronica Castro (Rete A).
- Diego 100% - sitcom with Diego Abbantantuono (also director), set in a Milan bar (Euro TV)

== Ending this year ==
- Gli affari sono affari
- Al Paradise
- Cartoni magici
- Pronto, Raffaella?
- Risatissima
- Superflash
- Supersanremo

== Deaths ==
- 27 February: Giuseppe (nicknamed Joe) Marrazzo, 56, RAI journalist, famous for his daring reportages about Italian organized crime.
- 6 March: Italo De Feo, (72), journalist and former RAI vice-president.
- 8 March: Gianni Granzotto, (71), journalist.
- 23 October: Stefano Satta Flores, (48), actor and presenter.
