= Quelli che... il calcio =

Italian television program (1993–2021)

Quelli che... il calcio ("Those who... [follow] football") is a sports-themed entertainment television program initially broadcast on Rai 3 from 26 September 1993 to 17 May 1998 and subsequently on Rai 2 from 13 September 1998 to 2 December 2021 on Sunday afternoon, during the period of activity of the Italian football championship. It followed and comments on the Serie A matches live.

The program was conducted from 1993 to 2001 by Fabio Fazio together with Marino Bartoletti, from 2001 to 2011 by Simona Ventura, from 2011 to 2013 by Victoria Cabello, from 2013 to 2017 by Nicola Savino and from 2017 to 2021 by the comic duo Luca and Paolo together with Mia Ceran. It aired from TV studio 3 of the Rai production center in Milan. In conjunction with the championship round held on Epiphany Day, the program also aired on 6 January, while on Easter week, it was aired on Holy Saturday.

== History ==
=== 1993-2001: presentation by Fabio Fazio ===
The broadcast debuted on Rai 3 on 26 September 1993 conducted by Fabio Fazio and Marino Bartoletti with the participation of sports journalists such as Carlo Sassi. Its name derives from the title of the song (which initially was also the theme song for the program) Quelli che ..., composed and sung by Enzo Jannacci, with the addition of the word "football," a sport that was the focus of discussion with satire and irony. The song by Jannacci for the broadcast, however, had a completely different text (it spoke of football) compared to the original version.

From his debut to the present day, he has also collaborated with the radio broadcast Tutto il calcio minuto per minuto ("All Football Minute by Minute") on Rai Radio 1; until 1997, in fact, the faces of the radio commentators appeared on a large video wall behind the conductor. In 1996, the video wall with the radio commentators was moved and placed behind the audience, undergoing numerous changes over the years.

The format was born, according to the host himself, as a television translation of the Rai Radio 1 radio program, and consisted of transmitting the results of Serie A and Serie B matches (until 2005, when they were moved to Saturday; from 2010, they were replaced by Serie C), which appear in succession at the bottom of the screen. The match commented live by the VIP reporters or the reporter at the event appeared on the upper part. When a Serie A team scored a goal, it was communicated live (until 2005 by the radio broadcast Tutto il calcio minuto per minuto, then by journalists in the studio); in the background, the screams of fans and epic music is broadcast, followed (when possible) by the hymn of the team that scored; from 1997, the new result of the match appeared in the upper part of the screen and on both edges of the screen, a flag with the colors of the team that scored, radio commentators commenting on the action on the spot (during the period of connection with Tutto il calcio minuto per minuto) and the minutes and names of the players who have scored their respective goals; finally, in the center of the screen, the cheers of the players (when possible) and the fans are broadcast live. This graphic would change over the years. Furthermore, until 2009, the Totocalcio ticket was shown at the interval and at the end of the matches.

During the first eight years of the program, comedians such as Teo Teocoli, Anna Marchesini and lesser known but still appreciated personalities alternated alongside the host, among which the Dutch astrologer Peter Van Wood, the Gambian journalist and Juventus fan Idris, the Japanese designer Takahide Sano, the journalist and TV presenter Luciano Rispoli, the pediatric primary and rowdy Sampdoria fan Renato Panconi, the Lazio nun Sister Paola, the journalist Paolo Brosio and the impassive-looking statistics expert Massimo Alfredo Giuseppe Maria Buscemi.

On 4 March 2001 the singer Anastacia performed her single Not That Kind, and later that year the single Paid My Dues.

During the first 4 years of broadcast, there were also fixed connections from the stadiums, and in particular, Everardo Dalla Noce - a former radio commentator and face of TG2 who for many years hosted the economic section - who commented all the games from the various stadiums in Italy together with his assistant, as well as director, Giacomo Forte. In addition to some episodes of the first 3 years, another former face of Tg2, Onofrio Pirrotta, was locked up in a newspaper kiosk at an Italian newsstand. From 1996 to 1999, the engineer Professor Roberto Vacca joined the guests of Quelli che il calcio.

In the same edition, the comedian Maurizio Battista joined the show from 1997 to 1999, then leaving the space to Maurizio Crozza.

=== 2001-2011: presentation by Simona Ventura ===
With the ninth edition, aired from 26 August 2001 to 5 May 2002, the role of host went to Simona Ventura; she would host the program for 10 years, making her the longest-running presenter of the broadcast. Despite the change in hosting, which involved the change of the format to a more youthful version, the broadcast continued to obtain high results from Auditel. It was also due to the updates given by sports journalists and/or former footballers, who analyzed the crucial moments of the matches and other sporting events in the afternoon (including Massimo Caputi, Bruno Pizzul, Ivan Zazzaroni, Marco Fiocchetti, Enrico Varriale, Luigi Maifredi, Bruno Gentili, Giampiero Galeazzi and Stefano Bettarini, who was the ex-husband of the host). Between 2001 and 2005, the program had an extraordinary four-year period. Among the comedians, in addition to the already present Tullio Solenghi and Dario Vergassola, the comedians Maurizio Crozza and Gene Gnocchi are added to the cast. The former became known for his imitations, while the latter for his political satire. Both comedians achieved extraordinary success: on 5 May 2002 the program reached a record 43% share and over 7 million viewers. In addition, Ventura had also managed to present several international pop stars, such as the English singer Amy Winehouse who performed on 4 November 2007, with her single Back to Black, and Lady Gaga, who debuted in 2009 with Paparazzi.

The reasons for the success were primarily found in the imitations, firstly by Maurizio Crozza, and later, Max Giusti and Lucia Ocone, in addition to the fixed presence of the sketches of Gene Gnocchi (present until 2007); other popular elements are: the VIP guests in the studio, who watched the games while ironically discussing them with the host; the "schedine", i.e. the young female assistants of the program to which the "mufloni" (i.e. the male assistants) were also added; the correspondents for live matches from the stadiums (already present in the Fazio era), mainly fans from the entertainment world; the special correspondents, first of all DJ Angelo and Nicola Savino of Radio DeeJay (who later became presenter of the program in the 2013-2014 edition), who participated in events of particular interest.

In 2005, following the passage of Serie A television rights from Rai to Mediaset, to "circumvent" the ban, numerous changes were made: the correspondents for the matches no longer spoke inside the stadiums, but commented on the matches in other places, simulating in some cases the environment of the stands, the audio connections with Tutto il calcio minuto per minuto (whose collaboration continues) for the goals are eliminated, which are announced by the reporters in the studio, together with the epic music and celebrations live, and football begins to be a little less protagonist at the expense of variety. From the 2008-2009 season the format returned to its origins (with the exception of the goals, always communicated by the journalists in the studio), with the reporters being able to return to the stadiums as RAI had again acquired the television rights of Serie A.

=== 2011-2013: presentation by Victoria Cabello ===
For the 2011-2012 season, the broadcast is entrusted to Victoria Cabello; in addition there is the return, after three years, of Paolo Beldì to directing. The regular correspondent of this edition is Marisa Passera while in the studio the presenter is flanked by the comic group Trio Medusa. As sports commentators who report the highlights of the matches we find Massimo Caputi (the only survivor of the Ventura editions), the Korean journalist Suri Chung and then the former referee Daniele Tombolini in recent months; the format also changes again, becoming a football-scandal talk show, making the program less satirical and also eliminating the dance troupe of past editions. Among comedians/imitators are Virginia Raffaele and Ubaldo Pantani; since January 2012 Marcello Cesena has also joined the cast of comedians, who brought the character of Jean Claude and his comic series Sensualità a corte. In this edition, for the first time, Victoria Cabello and her authors introduce a new figure: the football rapper, a role invented thanks to the idea of rapper Gianluca Grauso (G&G) to create and interpret reports on Serie A football matches during transmission. From January 2012 the program changes its scenography and sees the return of the technical commentator Bruno Pizzul, already present in the first editions presented by Simona Ventura and of Idris, present in the past in the editions conducted by Fabio Fazio. The 2012-2013 edition, also conducted by Victoria Cabello, becomes even more variety and even less football, as also underlined by the new title Quelli che... . All this is due to the loss of television rights for connections with the fields Serie A by Rai, as already happened in the three-year period 2005-2008. Consequently, Paolo Beldì again abandons the direction of the program which is entrusted to Massimo Fusi; in the middle of the season also Alba Parietti joins the cast, who intervenes with various comic sketches within the program. The 2012-2013 edition ends on May 19, 2013, marking the end of the Cabello era due to the expiration of the presenter's two-year contract with Rai.

=== 2013-2017: presentation by Nicola Savino ===
From the 2013-2014 season the program changes its title to Quelli che il calcio and therefore focuses again on football, which once again becomes the central theme of the broadcast, without missing forays into other disciplines and moments of variety and comedy. Nicola Savino (already present in the editions conducted by Simona Ventura as a correspondent in important events together with Digei Angelo) arrives to lead the program and Paolo Beldì returns to directing again, after a year of absence.

The presence of Massimo Caputi and Daniele Tombolini as commentators of the matches is confirmed, and also the audio connections with the historic radio broadcast Tutto il calcio minuto per minuto are restored, as happened in the editions of Fabio Fazio and in the first editions of the Ventura but, at unlike in the past, only for the live commentary of penalty kicks. Fixed correspondents of this edition are Valentina Ricci, in connection with parties, kermesse and festivals around Italy, and Maria Pia Timo (already present in the latest editions conducted by Simona Ventura) sent in various sporting events.

== Hosts ==
- 1993–2001 – Fabio Fazio
- 2001–2011 – Simona Ventura
- 2011–2013 – Victoria Cabello
- 2013–2017 – Nicola Savino and Gialappa's Band
- 2017–2021– Luca e Paolo and Mia Ceran
