= Luigi Furini =

Italian journalist and poet (born 1954)

- Born: January 29, 1954; Lungavilla (Pv)

Luigi Furini (Lungavilla Pv Italia, January 29, 1954) is an Italian journalist and author.

== Career ==
Furini was a Inter supporter. Starting in 2010, he co-hosted the TV program Qui studio a voi stadio on Telelombardia. He was fired from this position in August 2023 after using a racial slur on-air to describe Romelu Lukaku, a striker from the Chelsea Football Club who was being loaned to Inter at the time.

== Books ==
- Volevo solo vendere la pizza. Le disavventure di un piccolo imprenditore (2007)
- L'Italia in bolletta. Risparmi in fumo, debiti alle stelle: come si estingue il ceto medio (2009)
- Volevo solo lavorare. Siamo tutti precari: da giovani flessibili, licenziati a cinquant'anni... E la pensione che non arriva (2010)
