= Eleonora Brigliadori =

Italian model, actress and television personality

- Born: 18 February 1960 (age 66); Milan, Italy
- Occupations: Model; actress; television personality

Eleonora Brigliadori (born 18 February 1960) is an Italian model, actress and television personality. In 2016, she sparked controversy in Italy because of her views on chemotherapy and tumors.

== Early life and career ==
Born in Milan, already active as a runway model, Brigliadori began her television career in 1977, as an assistant of Enzo Tortora in the RAI variety show Portobello. One year later, at 18 years old, she made her acting debut on stage, in The Marriage of the petty bourgeois at the Theatre of the Royal Villa in Monza. In 1980 she was chosen as the main announcer of the newborn Canale 5.

Brigliadori came to the success with the Rai Uno Saturday night show Fantastico, that she hosted alongside Pippo Baudo and Heather Parisi in 1984. In 1988, she was dismissed from presenting the Zecchino d'Oro Festival as she had appeared as covermodel of the men's magazine Playmen. Subsequently, she starred on some television reality shows, including ice-skating-themed Notti sul ghiaccio and L'Isola dei Famosi, the Italian equivalent to Survivor.

== Controversies ==
In 2007, Brigliadori was sued for illegally painting a cliff on the Gallura coast, Sardinia. She claimed that she did so for artistic purposes. Into the 2010s and 2020s, she assumed a controversial position on medicine and more specifically tumors. She publicly labeled chemotherapy as responsible for the death of people undergoing it, she spoke out against researchers and pharmaceuticals producers alike, also describing Italian physician Umberto Veronesi as "a doctor from hell". Brigliadori publicly supports pseudo-scientific treatments against tumors on her Facebook account. She advocates the "Hamer method", based on the assumption that diseases generate from unsolved inner conflicts. Brigliadori exchanged harsh words with TV anchor Maurizio Costanzo on the subject, the latter having her walk away from his Maurizio Costanzo Show. Subsequently, she verbally and physically attacked a reporter for TV show Le Iene who was investigating on her preaching alternative healing methods.
