= David Messina (journalist) =

Italian journalist (1932–2024)

- Born: 7 February 1932; Palermo, Italy
- Died: 4 May 2024 (aged 92); Milan

David Messina (7 February 1932 – 4 May 2024) was an Italian journalist and television presenter.

== Life and career ==
=== In printed paper ===
Graduated in law, he began his journalism career at L'Ora of Palermo as a police reporter. His abilities, thanks to which became professional at the end of 1965, are not neglected by the big names in journalism, having worked as a sports reporter in Tuttosport (as a correspondent in Sicily), he moved to Milan as a correspondent of the newspaper La Stampa, Corriere dello Sport and Gazzetta dello Sport, becoming one of the major brands of the newspaper.

=== In television ===
In the late 1980s, he collaborated with Telemontecarlo, and after with Telelombardia founding programs at Qui studio a voi stadio and Cartellino Rosso (Red Card). After leaving Telelombardia he went to 7 Gold rush of transmission Diretta Stadio, then Play TV, Canale Italia (conducting various sports and current affairs programs) and Antenna 3.

=== Death ===
Messina died in Milan on 4 May 2024, at the age of 92.

== Books ==
- Sandro Mazzola vi insegna il calcio
- Va Italia va
- L'Italia di Arrigo Sacchi
- Gioie, brividi, avventure-ecco la storia di 68 anni di mondiali
