= Massimo Lopez =

Italian actor

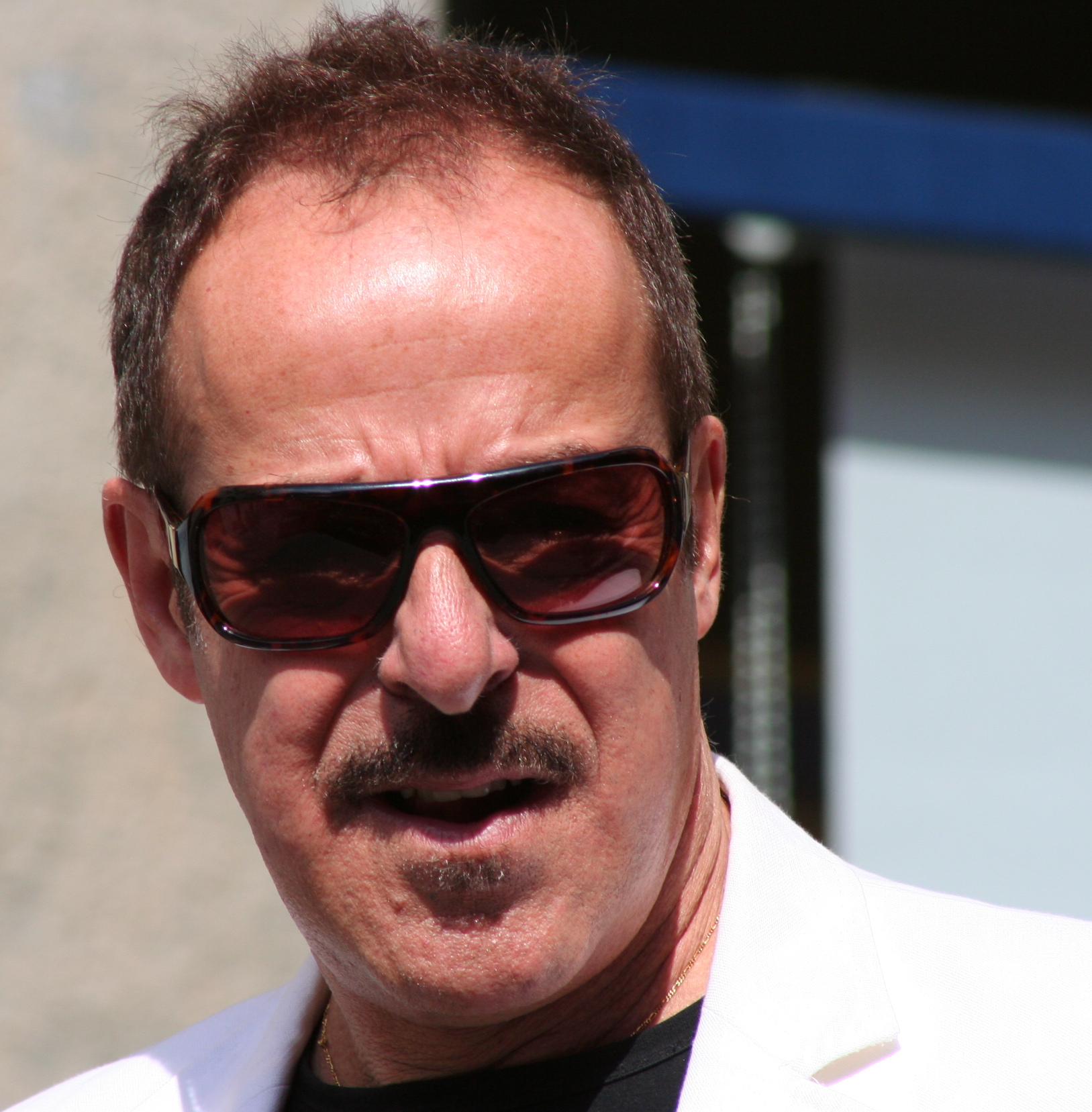
- Lopez in 2007
- Born: 11 January 1952 (age 74); Ascoli Piceno, Italy
- Occupations: Actor; voice actor; television presenter; comedian; impressionist; singer
- Years active: 1975–present
- Height: 1.80 m (5 ft 11 in)
- Relatives: Giorgio Lopez (brother)

Massimo Lopez (born 11 January 1952) is an Italian actor, voice actor, comedian, impressionist and television presenter.

Together with fellow actors Anna Marchesini and Tullio Solenghi, he has been a member of the comic group known as Il Trio (The Trio).

== Biography ==
Lopez was born to parents from Naples who were temporarily working in Ascoli Piceno, with the family ultimately settling in Rome. He started acting on stage in 1975, was first cast as a voice actor in 1980, and founded Il Trio in 1982 with Tullio Solenghi and Anna Marchesini: the Trio debuted on Rai Radio 2 with the Hellzapoppin radio show.

Following the great success of Hellzapoppin, the Trio participated in various television programs like Domenica in and the 1986 edition of Fantastico and took part to the Sanremo Music Festival editions of 1986, 1987 and 1989.

In 1990, the Trio reached the peak of success with the parody of Alessandro Manzoni's The Betrothed, which was broadcast on Rai 1 in 5 episodes. Together with Solenghi and Marchesini, Lopez brought on stage two theatrical shows: Allacciare le cinture di sicurezza (Fasten your seat belts) in 1987 and In principio era il trio (In the Beginning, there was the Trio) in 1990.

The Trio dissolved in 1994, due to the will of all three actors to work as soloists, but reunited for one last time in 2008 to celebrate its 25th anniversary with the TV-program Non esiste più la mezza stagione.

In 1998, Lopez made an appearance as a guest star in the soap opera The Bold and the Beautiful and in 2005 he hosted Striscia la notizia together with Solenghi. From 2005 to 2011 Lopez acted and sang in the theatre one-man-show Ciao Frankie (Goodbye, Frankie), also performed at the Colony Theatre in Miami, directed by his brother Giorgio Lopez and dedicated to Frank Sinatra, featuring songs, gags and impressions.

As a voice actor, Lopez is known for dubbing voices, such as Robin Williams' in the live action adaption of Popeye, Mike Myers in the second installment of the Austin Powers movies, and Stephen Fry in The Hobbit. In his animated roles, he has been providing the current Italian voice of Homer Simpson in The Simpsons since the death of Tonino Accolla in 2013 and has performed the Italian voice of Grand Pabbie in Frozen, Ramon in Happy Feet, Mr. Peabody in Mr. Peabody & Sherman and Lionheart in Zootopia.

On 27 March 2017 Lopez suffered a heart attack while he was performing on stage; he quickly underwent an angioplasty and was transferred to a cardiological rehabilitation center, where he recovered completely and came back on stage two months later.

=== Personal life ===
Lopez is the younger brother of the late actor, voice actor and theatre director Giorgio Lopez, who was the official Italian dubbing artist for Danny DeVito until his death in 2021. He is also the uncle of voice actors Gabriele and Andrea Lopez.

== Filmography ==
=== Cinema ===
Year	Title	Role(s)	Notes
1982	Odd Squad	Pasquale Cutolo	Comedy
1984	Ladies & Gentlemen	Fella	Comedy
2001	Aida of the Trees	Ramfis (voice)	Animated film
2012	Lightning Strike	Pope Benedict XVI (voice)	Comedy
2021	Help! My In-Laws Are Vampires!	Sirio (voice)	Comedy horror
2021	Antonio	Pinocchio/Narrator (voice)	Short film
2022	Buon lavoro		
2023	La quattordicesima domenica del tempo ordinario	Samuele Nascetti	Drama

=== Television ===
Year	Title	Role(s)	Notes
1978	The Venetian Twins	Florindo	Special
1981	La donna serpente	Togrul	Special
1984	I veleni dei Gonzaga	Charles V	TV film
1990	The Betrothed	Don Rodrigo / Fra Cristoforo / Various characters	Miniseries, main role
1998	Professione fantasma	Inspector Max Ventura	TV series, lead role
1998	The Bold and the Beautiful		Soap opera, guest star
2001	Compagni di scuola	Felice Salina	TV series, lead role
2002	Max & Tux	Max	Sitcom, lead role
2012	Le mille e una notte - Aladino e Sherazade	The Genie	Miniseries
2015-2019	Winx Club	Rhodos (voice)	Animated TV series

=== Dubbing ===
==== Films (Animation, Italian dub) ====
Year	Title	Role(s)	Ref
1999	A Monkey's Tale	Sebastian	
2006	Happy Feet	Ramon	
2009	A Town Called Panic	Horse	
2011	Happy Feet Two	Ramon	
2013	Turbo	Bobby	
2013	Justin and the Knights of Valour	Blucher	
2013	Frozen	Grand Pabbie	
2013	Legends of Oz: Dorothy's Return	Cowardly Lion	
2014	The Boxtrolls	Archiebald Snatcher	
2014	Mr. Peabody & Sherman	Mr. Peabody	
2014	Pudsey the Dog: The Movie	Edward the Horse	
2014	Rio 2	Eduardo	
2015	Strange Magic	Stuff	
2016	Zootopia	Mayor Leodore Lionheart	
2016	Ratchet & Clank	Captain Qwark	
2017	Smurfs: The Lost Village	Papa Smurf	
2019	Frozen II	Grand Pabbie	
2021	The Good, the Bart, and the Loki	Homer Simpson	
2021	Plusaversary	Homer Simpson	
2021	Vivo	Andrés	
2021	The Boss Baby: Family Business	Erwin Armstrong	

==== Films (Live action, Italian dub) ====
Year	Title	Role(s)	Original actor	Ref
1980	Popeye	Popeye	Robin Williams	
1981	Game of Death II	Lee Chen-chiang	Bruce Lee	
1982	Night Shift	Chuck Lumley	Henry Winkler	
1982	Angkor: Cambodia Express	Andrew Cameron	Robert Walker	
1988	The Cannibals	Viscount d'Aveleda	Luís Miguel Cintra	
1997	Banzai	Mr. Parker	John Armstead	
1999	Austin Powers: The Spy Who Shagged Me	Austin Powers	Mike Myers	
1999	Austin Powers: The Spy Who Shagged Me	Dr. Evil	Mike Myers	
1999	Austin Powers: The Spy Who Shagged Me	Fat Bastard	Mike Myers	
2009	A Single Man	George Falconer	Colin Firth	
2012	Houba! On the Trail of the Marsupilami	General Pochero	Lambert Wilson	
2013	Hummingbird	Damon Caulfield	Danny Webb	
2013	The Hobbit: The Desolation of Smaug	Master of Lake-town	Stephen Fry	
2013	The Congress	Reeve Bobs	Don McManus	
2013	The Internship	Not Professor X	Jarion Monroe	
2013	The 100-Year-Old Man Who Climbed Out of the Window and Disappeared	Allan Karlsson	Robert Gustafsson	
2013	12 Years a Slave	Mr. Parker	Rob Steinberg	
2014	Teenage Mutant Ninja Turtles	Splinter	Tony Shalhoub	
2014	The Hobbit: The Battle of the Five Armies	Master of Lake-town	Stephen Fry	
2014	A Most Wanted Man	Tommy Brue	Willem Dafoe	
2014	22 Jump Street	The Ghost	Peter Stormare	
2015	A Man Called Ove	Ove Lindahl	Rolf Lassgård	
2015	A Man Called Ove	Ove Lindahl	Filip Berg	
2015	The Big Short	Lawrence Fields	Tracy Letts	
2015	The Walk	Papa Rudy	Ben Kingsley	
2015	Trumbo	Sam Wood	John Getz	
2015	Mad Max: Fury Road	The Bullet Farmer	Richard Carter	
2016	London Has Fallen	Aamir Barkawi	Alon Abutbul	
2016	Love & Friendship	Mr. Johnson	Stephen Fry	
2016	Pride and Prejudice and Zombies	Mr. Bennet	Charles Dance	
2016	Live by Night	Ritz Investor	Christian Clemenson	
2016	Teenage Mutant Ninja Turtles: Out of the Shadows	Splinter	Tony Shalhoub	
2016	Toni Erdmann	Gerald	Thomas Loibl	
2016	31	Death-Head	Torsten Voges	
2016	Alice Through the Looking Glass	Zanik Hightopp	Rhys Ifans	
2017	Overdrive	Jacomo Morier	Simon Abkarian	
2017	The Children Act	Mark Berner	Anthony Calf	
2017	The Leisure Seeker	Will Spencer	Christian McKay	
2017	The Disaster Artist	Method acting teacher	Bob Odenkirk	
2017	Gangster Land	Abe Bernstein	Hal Alpert	
2018	Mamma Mia! Here We Go Again	Fernando Cienfuegos	Andy García	
2018	The Mule	Latón	Andy García	
2020	Jingle Jangle: A Christmas Journey	Jeronicus Jangle	Forest Whitaker	
2021	The Night House	Mel	Vondie Curtis-Hall	
2023	The Palace	Arthur William Dallas III	John Cleese	
2024	Joker: Folie à Deux	Jackie Sullivan	Brendan Gleeson	

==== Television (Animation, Italian dub) ====
Year	Title	Role(s)	Notes	Ref
1980–1982	The Tom and Jerry Comedy Show	Droopy	Main cast	
1980–1982	Fisherman Sanpei	Gyoshin Ayukawa	Main cast	
1981	Supercar Gattiger	Joe Kabuki	Main cast	
1981	Bugs Bunny's Looney Christmas Tales	Light company man, airplane pilots	Special	
1981–1982	Dogtanian and the Three Muskehounds	Aramis	Main cast	
1982	Bugs Bunny's Bustin' Out All Over	Marvin the Martian	Special	
2004–present	Peppa Pig	Dr. Bear	Recurring role	
2004–2009	Miss Spider's Sunny Patch Friends	Spiderus Reeves	Main cast	
2012	Futurama	Lando Tucker Sr.	Episode: "Mobius Dick"	
2012	Futurama	Ben	Episode: "The Bots and the Bees"	
2012	Futurama	Larvae Levin	Episode: "The Thief of Baghead"	
2012	Futurama	Ab-bot	Episode: "A Clockwork Origin"	
2012–present	The Simpsons	Homer Simpson	Main cast (season 24–present)	
2012–present	The Simpsons	Grampa Simpson (young)	Main cast (season 24–present)	
2012–present	The Simpsons	Various characters	Main cast (season 24–present)	
2013–2014	Strange Hill High	Mr. Abercrombie	Main cast	
2013–2016	Doc McStuffins	Chilly	Main cast (season 2-4)	
2014	Family Guy	Homer Simpson	Episode: "The Simpsons Guy"	
2014	BoJack Horseman	Quentin Tarantulino	2 episodes	
2015–2020	New Looney Tunes	Cecil Turtle	Recurring role	
2016–2018	Skylanders Academy	Master Eon	Main cast	
2022	Little Demon	Satan	Lead role	
2023	Digman!	Quail Eegan	Main cast	
2024	Secret Level	Tiangong	Episode: "Honor of Kings: The Way of All Things"	

==== Television (Live action, Italian dub) ====
Year	Title	Role(s)	Notes	Original actor	Ref
1980-1981	Happy Days	Myron "Count" Malachi	Guest role (season 4)	Michael Pataki	
1980-1981	Happy Days	Jacques Du Bois	1 episode (season 6)	Patrick Gorman	
1980-1981	Happy Days	Sergeant Ryan	Recurring role	Ray Girardin	
2012–2018	The Big Bang Theory	Stephen Hawking	7 episodes	Stephen Hawking	
2015	Deadwood	Cy Tolliver	Main cast	Powers Boothe	
2015	Once Upon a Time	Grand Pabbie	Episode: "A Tale of Two Sisters"	John Rhys-Davies	
2015–2016	Daredevil	Ben Urich	Main cast (season 1)	Vondie Curtis-Hall	
2015–2016	Daredevil	Ray Schoonover / Blacksmith	2 episodes (season 2)	Clancy Brown	
2015–2019	Jane the Virgin	Latin Lover Narrator	Main cast	Anthony Mendez	
2016	Game of Thrones	Izembaro	3 episodes (season 6)	Richard E. Grant	

==== Video games (Italian dub) ====
Year	Title	Role(s)	Ref
2015	Lego Dimensions	Homer Simpson	

== Television ==
=== With the Trio ===
- Domenica in (1985–1986)
- Fantastico (1986–1987)
- Sanremo Music Festival 1986 (1986)
- Sanremo Music Festival 1987 (1987)
- Sanremo Music Festival 1989 (1989)
- Non esiste più la mezza stagione (2008)

=== As soloist ===
- Scherzi a parte (1995, 1997)
- Quelli che... il Calcio (2001–2002)
- Striscia la notizia (2005)
- Miss Italia Show (2018)
