= Gian Luca Rossi =

Italian sports journalist (born 1966)

- Born: Gian Luca Massimiliano Rossi; September 17, 1966; Milan, Italy
- Occupation: Journalist
- Military career
- Allegiance: Italy
- Branch: Italian Army
- Service years: 2014 - 2021
- Rank: Major
- Unit: Army's Selected Reserve

Gian Luca Rossi (Milan, September 17, 1966) is an Italian sports journalist, TV presenter and since 2013 a reserve army officer with the rank of major.

== Career ==
Graduated in Law with a thesis on the sport accidents in Roman law and modern, he became a journalist in 1988 and became professional in 1995. He began working in 1986 as a commentator on Radio Peter Flowers, and in 1988 he moved to Telelombardia to do the official commentator of the matches of Inter in the transmission Qui studio a voi stadio, commenting live the victory of the 1989 Scudetto won by Giovanni Trapattoni as coach. He has worked with newspapers Tuttosport, Il Giorno, the monthly Milan-Inter derby and, since 2004, following F.C. Inter also on Antenna 3.
