= Alfio =

Alfio (Italian: [ˈalfjo]) is an Italian masculine given name. Notable people with the name include:

- Alfio Basile, Argentina football coach
- Alfio Bonanno, Australian tenor
- Alfio Caltabiano, Italian actor
- Alfio Contini, Italian cinematographer
- Alfio Fazio, Italian composer
- Alfio Fontana, Italian footballer
- Alfio Giuffrida, Italian sculptor
- Alfio Marchini, Italian entrepreneur
- Alfio Molina, Swiss ice hockey player
- Alfio Musmarra, Italian journalist
- Alfio Oviedo, Paraguayan footballer
- Alfio Peraboni, Italian sailor
- Alfio Piva, Costa Rican politician
- Alfio Quarteroni, Italian mathematician
- Alfio Rapisarda, Vatican diplomat
- Alfio Vandi, Italian racing cyclist
