= La moglie in vacanza... l'amante in città =

1980 film by Sergio Martino

- Directed by: Sergio Martino
- Written by: Ottavio Jemma; Jean Louis; Giorgio Mariuzzo; Sergio Martino; Francesco Milizia; Michele Massimo Tarantini
- Produced by: Luciano Martino
- Starring: Renzo Montagnani; Edwige Fenech; Barbara Bouchet; Lino Banfi
- Cinematography: Giancarlo Ferrando
- Edited by: Eugenio Alabiso
- Music by: Detto Mariano
- Release date: 1981
- Language: Italian

La moglie in vacanza... l'amante in città (The wife on vacation ... the lover in town) is a 1981 commedia sexy all'italiana directed by Sergio Martino.

== Plot ==
During a holiday in Courmayeur, a wealthy industrialist from Parma finds himself in the same hotel with his wife, his lover and the lover of his wife.

== Cast ==
- Renzo Montagnani as Andrea Damiani
- Edwige Fenech as Giulia
- Barbara Bouchet as Valeria
- Lino Banfi as Peppino
- Tullio Solenghi as Giovanni La Carretta
- Marisa Merlini as Andrea's mother-in-law
- Pippo Santonastaso as Emilio Casadei
- Renzo Ozzano as Vasha Milova
- Jacques Stany as Toni
- Maria Teresa Ruta as the nurse

== Production ==
The film was shot between Parma and Courmayeur. The role of Giovanni, later played by Tullio Solenghi, was originally intended for Christian De Sica.

== Release ==
The film was released in Italian cinemas by Medusa on 30 January 1981.

== Reception ==
The film was a box office success, grossing over 1,8 billion lire. Marco Giusti described it as an early attempt to mix commedia sexy and high comedy.
