= Maurizio Ferrini =

Italian actor and television personality

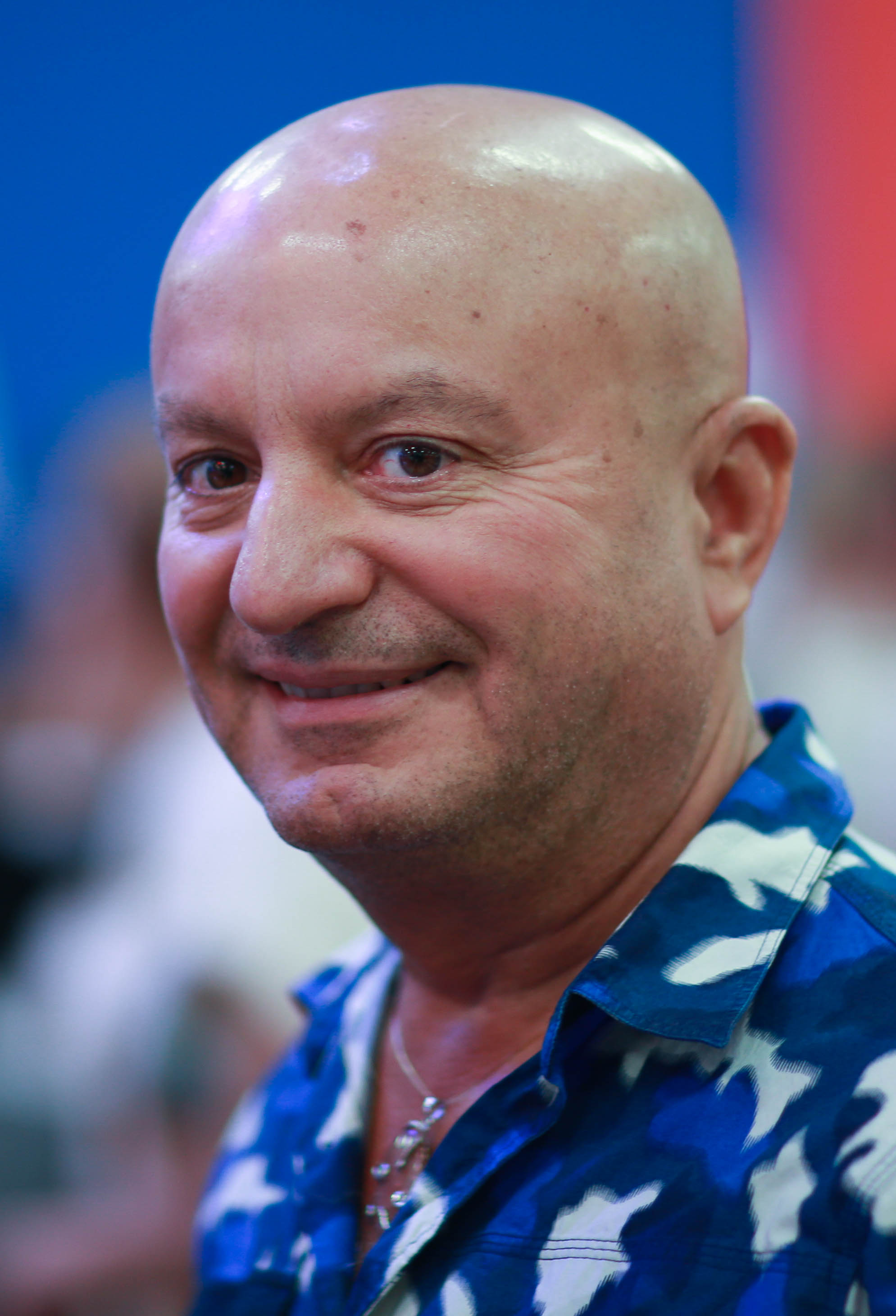
- Born: 12 April 1953 (age 73); Cesena, Italy
- Occupation: Actor
- Years active: 1985–present
- Height: 157 cm (5 ft 2 in)
- Spouse: Carla Urban (m. 1985; div. 1994)
- Partner: Sara Guglielmi

Maurizio Ferrini (born 12 April 1953) is an Italian actor and television personality.

== Biography ==
Ferrini was born in Cesena, Emilia-Romagna, Italy, in 1953. He made his artistic debut in Quelli della notte, starring alongside Renzo Arbore and establishing himself as an eccentric comedian. During the show's airing, he was known for his trademark Non capisco, ma mi adeguo (English: I can't understand, but I adapt myself).

Afterwards, Ferrini went to participate in Domenica in, during the 1989–1990 edition, where he created, and played en travesti, the character of Mrs Emma Coriandoli, a humoristic take on Italian housewives. During the early 2000s he appeared in TV shows only occasionally, as a guest, until in 2005 Simona Ventura offered him to participate in the reality show L'isola dei famosi, where he achieved second place with 25% of the audience's preferences. In 2007, he played a minor role in the drama Ma chi l'avrebbe mai detto acting alongside Ornella Muti and Katia Ricciarelli.

He considers himself Roman Catholic.

== Filmography ==
=== Movies ===
- 1986 – Il commissario Lo Gatto, director Dino Risi
- 1987 – Animali metropolitani, director Steno
- 1988 – Compagni di scuola, director Carlo Verdone
- 1989 – Saremo felici, director Gianfrancesco Lazotti
- 1992 – Sognando la California, director Carlo Vanzina
- 2021 – Credo in un solo padre, director Luca Guardabascio
- 2023 – Fiori di Baggio, director Federico Rizzo

=== Television ===
- 2005 – L'isola dei famosi
- 2006 – Suonare Stella, director Giancarlo Nicotra
- 2007 – Ma chi l'avrebbe mai detto, directors Giuliana Gamba and Alessio Inturri
- 2011 – Don Matteo 8

== Books ==
- Ferrini, Maurizio (1992). L'ultimo comunista (in Italian). Milan: Arnoldo Mondadori. ISBN 88-04-35954-4.
- Emma Coriandoli (1993). È permesso? (in Italian). Milan: Arnoldo Mondadori. ISBN 88-04-36886-1.
- Ferrini, Maurizio (2016). ...O no? (in Italian). Rome: Manfredi. ISBN 978-88-99519-18-6.
