= Sognando la California =

- Directed by: Carlo Vanzina
- Written by: Carlo Vanzina; Enrico Vanzina
- Starring: Massimo Boldi; Nino Frassica; Maurizio Ferrini; Antonello Fassari; Bo Derek
- Edited by: Sergio Montanari
- Music by: Umberto Smaila
- Release date: 18 December 1992
- Running time: 100 minutes
- Country: Italy
- Language: Italian

Sognando la California (lit. 'California dreaming') is a 1992 Italian comedy film directed by Carlo Vanzina.

== Cast ==
- Massimo Boldi as Lorenzo Colombo
- Nino Frassica as Antonio Castagna
- Antonello Fassari as Giovanni Sbariggia
- Maurizio Ferrini as Silvio Morandi
- Bo Derek as herself
- Francesca Reggiani as Cinzia Morechini
- Renato Pareti as Bepi
- Irene Lovborg as the girl at the airport
- Scott Bray as an Italian tourist
