= Simona Marchini =

Italian actress and television presenter

- Born: 19 December 1941 (age 83); Rome, Kingdom of Italy
- Occupation: Actress
- Height: 1.63 m (5 ft 4 in)
- Spouses: Roberto Paolopoli (divorced) Franco Cordova (m. 1970; div. 1980)

Simona Marchini (born 19 December 1941) is an Italian actress, television and radio presenter, stage director, comedian and art dealer.

== Life and career ==
Born in Rome, the daughter of the businessman Alvaro, Marchini graduated in modern literature at La Sapienza University. An art lover, since 1966 she directed several art galleries, notably directing the Contemporary Art Gallery "Nuova Pesa" between 1985 and 1995.

After an intense stage career as actress and director, in 1980 she made her television debut as a comedian in the RAI variety show A tutto gag, and appeared in character roles in some comedy films. In 1985 she had her breakout thanks to her participation to Renzo Arbore's Quelli della notte. Marchini later hosted several television and radio programs, including Prossimamente non stop, Pronto, è la Rai? and Piacere Raiuno. She was also on the board of the Teatro dell'Opera di Roma, and between 1999 and 2008 she was director of Todi Arte Festival.

=== Personal life ===
Previously married to a nobleman from Calabria, between 1970 and 1980 Marchini was married to footballer Franco Cordova.

She is a UNICEF Goodwill Ambassador. She considers herself Roman Catholic.
