= Anna Marchesini =

Italian actress and comedian (1953–2016)

- Marchesini as Lucia Mondella in the 1990 parody of The Betrothed
- Born: Anna Rita Marchesini; 19 November 1953; Orvieto, Italy
- Died: 30 July 2016 (aged 62); Orvieto, Italy
- Education: Silvio D'Amico National Academy of Dramatic Arts; Sapienza University of Rome
- Occupations: Actress; voice actress; comedian; impressionist; writer
- Years active: 1976–2016
- Spouse: Paki Valente (m. 1991; div. 2001)
- Children: 1

Anna Rita Marchesini (Italian pronunciation: [ˈanna ˈriːta markeˈziːni]; 19 November 1953 – 30 July 2016) was an Italian actress, voice actress, comedian, impressionist and writer.

Together with fellow actors Tullio Solenghi and Massimo Lopez, she was a member of the comedy group known as Il Trio ("The Trio").

== Career ==
Marchesini graduated in Psychology at the Sapienza University of Rome in 1975 and attended, from the following year, the Silvio D'Amico National Academy of Dramatic Arts. She began her career on stage and as a voice actress: in 1982, during a dubbing session, she met Massimo Lopez and, together with Tullio Solenghi, they founded Il Trio, which debuts on Rai Radio 2 with the Hellzapoppin radio show.

Following the great success of Hellzapoppin, the Trio participated in various television programs like Domenica in and the 1986 edition of Fantastico and took part in the Sanremo Music Festival editions of 1986, 1987 and 1989.

In 1990, the Trio reaches the peak of success with the parody of Alessandro Manzoni's The Betrothed, which was broadcast on Rai 1 in 5 episodes. Together with Solenghi and Lopez, Marchesini brought on stage two theatrical shows: Allacciare le cinture di sicurezza (Fasten your seat belts) in 1987 and In principio era il trio (In the Beginning, there was the Trio) in 1990.

The Trio dissolved in 1994, due to the will of all three actors to work as soloists, but reunited for one last time in 2008 to celebrate its 25th anniversary with the TV program Non esiste più la mezza stagione. As a soloist, Marchesini took part in several TV programs, giving impressions of famous personalities such as Gina Lollobrigida and Rita Levi-Montalcini.

Since 2000, Marchesini began as well her writing career with several collections of stories and short comic monologues, like ...che siccome che sono cecata (...since I am blind, 2000), quoting one of her most famous catchphrases, Il terrazzino dei gerani timidi (The terrace of shy geraniums, 2011) and Moscerine (Gnats, 2013).

An important work as a voice actress is in providing the Italian voice for Judy Garland, starting with The Wizard of Oz. She is also the Italian voice for Yzma in The Emperor's New Groove.

== Personal life and death ==
Marchesini was married to actor Pasquale "Paki" Valente from 1991 until their divorce in 2001. Together, they had one daughter, Virginia.

Having suffered for many years from rheumatoid arthritis, Marchesini died in her home in her native city of Orvieto on 30 July 2016, at the age of 62. Her body was cremated and buried in the family chapel at the Orvieto cemetery.

== Television ==
=== With the Trio ===
- Domenica in (1985–1986)
- Fantastico (1986–1987)
- Sanremo Music Festival 1986 (1986)
- Sanremo Music Festival 1987 (1987)
- Sanremo Music Festival 1989 (1989)
- Non esiste più la mezza stagione (2008)

=== As soloist ===
- Quelli che... il Calcio (1997–2001)
- Sanremo Music Festival 1999 (1999)
- Sanremo Music Festival 2002 (2002)
