= Stefano Donati =

Italian journalist (born 1982)

- Born: 27 August 1982; Treviglio, Italy

Stefano Donati (born 27 August 1982 in Treviglio, Italy) is an Italian sports journalist and TV presenter of Qui studio a voi stadio.
