= Professione fantasma =

- Genre: Comedy; Mystery
- Created by: Vittorio De Sisti
- Starring: Massimo Lopez; Edy Angelillo; Marzia Ubaldi; Giorgio Lopez; Bruno Bilotta; Roberto Della Casa; Fabiano Vagnarelli; Max von Sydow
- Country of origin: Italy
- No. of seasons: 1
- No. of episodes: 11

Original release
- Network: Italia 1
- Release: February 6 – April 17, 1998

Professione fantasma is an Italian giallo-comedy television series.

== Cast ==
- Massimo Lopez: Max Ventura
- Edi Angelillo: Lella Baldini
- Max von Sydow: The "Afterlife Psychoanalyst"
- Bruno Bilotta: Ettore
- Marzia Ubaldi: Serena Baldini

== See also ==
- List of Italian television series
