= Cristiano Ruiu =

Italian sports reporter

- Born: 19 February 1979 (age 47); Milan, Italy
- Occupation: Journalist
- Spouse: Sara Ripamonti
- Children: 1

Cristiano Ruiu (born February 19, 1979) is an Italian sports journalist and occasional TV presenter of Qui studio a voi stadio (QSVS).
