= Giorgio Lopez =

Italian voice actor (1947–2021)

- Born: 16 February 1947; Naples, Italy
- Died: 10 August 2021 (aged 74); Rome, Italy
- Occupations: Actor; voice actor; theatre director; playwright; dialogue adapter; dubbing director
- Years active: 1969–2021
- Children: Gabriele; Andrea
- Relatives: Massimo Lopez (brother)

Giorgio Lopez (16 February 1947 – 10 August 2021) was an Italian actor, voice actor, and theatre director.

== Biography ==
Born in Naples, Lopez began his career during the late 1960s. Remembered for his work as a stage actor, director and playwright, he was also widely known as a voice actor, being the official Italian voice dubber of Danny DeVito, John Cleese, also regularly dubbing Dustin Hoffman since the death of Ferruccio Amendola in 2001.

Lopez had also dubbed the voices of characters portrayed by Groucho Marx, John Hurt, Ian Holm, Michael Jeter, Pat Morita and Bob Hoskins. His character roles include Garrick Ollivander (portrayed by John Hurt) in the Harry Potter films, Geoffrey Butler (portrayed by Joseph Marcell) in The Fresh Prince of Bel-Air and Mr. Miyagi (portrayed by Pat Morita) in The Karate Kid.

Some of Lopez’s animated roles include King Harold in the Shrek movies, Gene in DuckTales the Movie: Treasure of the Lost Lamp, Baby Herman as a grown-up in Who Framed Roger Rabbit, J. Audubon Woodlore in Hooked Bear, Bootle Beetle in named character short and The Greener Yard in the 1991 redubbing, Scrooge McDuck from 1996 until 2020, replacing Gigi Angelillo, and many characters in Matt Groening's Futurama (of which Lopez served as a dubbing director for the Italian version) and The Simpsons.

From 2005 to 2011 Lopez directed his brother Massimo in the theatre one-man-show Ciao Frankie (Goodbye, Frankie), dedicated to Frank Sinatra, featuring songs, gags and impressions, which was also performed at the Colony Theatre in Miami.

=== Personal life ===
Lopez was the father of voice actors Gabriele and Andrea Lopez. He was also the older brother of actor and Trio member Massimo Lopez.

== Death ==
Ill with cardiopathy and diabetes, Lopez died in Rome on the morning of 10 August 2021, at the age of 74.

== Filmography ==
=== Cinema ===
Year	Title	Role	Notes
1974	The Minor		
1985	Mezzo destro mezzo sinistro - 2 calciatori senza pallone	American Soccer Commentator	
2012	Pinocchio	Alidoro (voice)	Animated film
2016	Fräulein - Una fiaba d'inverno	Narrator (voice)	Comedy/Drama

=== Television ===
Year	Title	Role	Notes
1970	Mother Courage and Her Two Children		TV play
1971	Julius Caesar	Dardanius	TV play
1971	September 8th	Mario Badoglio	TV play
1975	La contessa Lara	Journalist	TV miniseries
1975	As You Like It	Oliver	TV play
1976	Il garofano rosso	Pelagrua	TV miniseries
1980	Gioco di morte	Castro	TV film
1998	Professione fantasma	Commissario Salvi	TV series
2002	Don Matteo	Coroner	TV series, 1 episode (season 3, episode 10)
2013	Le straordinarie avventure di Jules Verne	De L'Ennui' (voice)	Animated series

=== Dubbing ===
==== Films (Animation, Italian dub) ====
Year	Title	Role(s)	Ref
1988	Who Framed Roger Rabbit	Baby Herman	
1988	The Land Before Time	Narrator	
1989	All Dogs Go to Heaven	Itchy Itchiford	
1990	Roller Coaster Rabbit	Baby Herman	
1990	DuckTales the Movie: Treasure of the Lost Lamp	Genie	
1992	FernGully: The Last Rainforest	Root	
1992	Cool World	Dr. Vincent "Vegas Vinnie" Whiskers	
1993	The Nightmare Before Christmas	Mayor of Halloween Town	
1994	A Troll in Central Park	Llort	
1994	The Swan Princess	Lord Rogers	
1994	The Pagemaster	Adventure	
1995	Balto	Boris Goosinov	
1995	Pocahontas	Kekata	
1995	Memories	Oomaeda	
1997	The Swan Princess: Escape from Castle Mountain	Lord Rogers	
1997	Chipollino	Tomato	
1997	Princess Mononoke	Jigo	
1998	The Swan Princess III: The Mystery of the Enchanted Treasure	Lord Rogers	
1999	Mickey's Once Upon a Christmas	Scrooge McDuck	
1999	South Park: Bigger, Longer & Uncut	Jimbo Kearn	
1999	Madeline: Lost in Paris	Lord Cucuface	
2000	Scooby-Doo and the Alien Invaders	Lester	
2000	Rugrats in Paris: The Movie	Jean-Claude	
2001	Jimmy Neutron: Boy Genius	Ooblar	
2001	Final Fantasy: The Spirits Within	Dr. Sid	
2001	The Trumpet of the Swan	Father	
2002	The Wild Thornberrys Movie	Colonel Radcliffe Thornberry	
2002	Eight Crazy Nights	Whitey Duvall	
2003	101 Dalmatians II: Patch's London Adventure	Lil' Lightning	
2003	El Cid: The Legend	Emir Al-Qadir II	
2004	Steamboy	Lloyd Steam	
2004	Shrek 2	King Harold	
2004	Mickey's Twice Upon a Christmas	Scrooge McDuck	
2005	Pinocchio 3000	Mayor Scamboli	
2005	Valiant	Felix	
2005	Chicken Little	Buck "Ace" Cluck	
2005	Wallace & Gromit: The Curse of the Were-Rabbit	Reverend Clement Hedges	
2006	Open Season	McSquizzy	
2006	Flushed Away	Pegleg	
2006	Paprika	Dr. Toratarō Shima	
2006	Hui Buh: The Goofy Ghost	Castellan	
2007	Shrek the Third	King Harold	
2008	Open Season 2	McSquizzy	
2009	Astro Boy	Dr. Elefun	
2010	Shrek Forever After	King Harold	
2010	Open Season 3	McSquizzy	
2010	Dante's Inferno: An Animated Epic	Alighiero di Bellincione	
2010	Dante's Inferno: An Animated Epic	Richard I	
2010	A Cat in Paris	Victor Costa	
2011	Arthur Christmas	Grandsanta	
2012	Zarafa	Malaterre	
2013	Free Birds	Leatherbeak	
2013	The House of Magic	Lawrence Savile	
2013	Justin and the Knights of Valour	Braulio	
2014	The Lego Movie	Albus Dumbledore	
2014	The Boxtrolls	Boulanger	
2014	Coconut, the Little Dragon	Grandpa George	
2014	Song of the Sea	The Great Seanachaí	
2015	Dragon Ball Z: Resurrection 'F'	Dr. Briefs	
2015	A Warrior's Tail	The King	
2016	Trolls	King Gristle Sr.	
2021	Secret Magic Control Agency	The King	

==== Films (Live action, Italian dub) ====
Year	Title	Role(s)	Original actor	Ref
1977	Pumping Iron	Narrator	Charles Gaines	
1984	Greystoke: The Legend of Tarzan, Lord of the Apes	Phillippe d'Arnot	Ian Holm	
1984	The Karate Kid	Mr. Miyagi	Pat Morita	
1985	Head Office	Frank Steadman	Danny DeVito	
1985	Silverado	Sheriff Langston	John Cleese	
1985	National Lampoon's European Vacation	Kent Winkdale	John Astin	
1985	The Goonies	Irving Walsh	Keith Walker	
1985	Rambo: First Blood Part II	Sergei T. Podovsky	Steven Berkoff	
1986	The Name of the Rose	Ubertino of Casale	William Hickey	
1986	Sweet Liberty	Stanley Gould	Bob Hoskins	
1986	The Karate Kid Part II	Mr. Miyagi	Pat Morita	
1986	Little Shop of Horrors	Wink Wilkinson	John Candy	
1986	Three Amigos	Morty	Jon Lovitz	
1987	Throw Momma from the Train	Owen Lift	Danny DeVito	
1988	A Fish Called Wanda	Archie Leach	John Cleese	
1988	Twins	Vincent Benedict	Danny DeVito	
1988	Short Circuit 2	Oscar Baldwin	Jack Weston	
1988	My Stepmother Is an Alien	Lucas Budlong	Joseph Maher	
1988	Funny Farm	Michael Sinclair	Joseph Maher	
1988	The Adventures of Baron Munchausen	Baron Munchausen	John Neville	
1988	Mississippi Burning	Ray Stuckey	Gailard Sartain	
1988	Die Hard	Joseph Yoshinobu Takagi	James Shigeta	
1989	The Karate Kid Part III	Mr. Miyagi	Pat Morita	
1989	Physical Evidence	James Nicks	Ned Beatty	
1989	When Harry Met Sally...	Gary	Kyle T. Heffner	
1989	Miss Firecracker	Mac Sam	Scott Glenn	
1989	The January Man	Eamon Flynn	Rod Steiger	
1989	Driving Miss Daisy	Boolie Werthan	Dan Aykroyd	
1990	The Cocoanuts	Mr. Hammer (1990 dubbing)	Groucho Marx	
1990	Animal Crackers	Captain Spaulding (1990 dubbing)	Groucho Marx	
1990	Monkey Business	Groucho (1990 dubbing)	Groucho Marx	
1990	A Day at the Races	Dr. Hugo Z. Hackenbush (1990 redub)	Groucho Marx	
1990	Room Service	Gordon Miller (1990 dubbing)	Groucho Marx	
1990	At the Circus	J. Cheever Loophole (1990 redub)	Groucho Marx	
1990	Go West	S. Quentin Quale (1990 redub)	Groucho Marx	
1990	A Girl in Every Port	Benny Linn (1990 dubbing)	Groucho Marx	
1990	Cadillac Man	Jack "Little Jack" Turgeon	Paul Guilfoyle	
1991	Other People's Money	Lawrence Garfield	Danny DeVito	
1991	Nothing but Trouble	Alvin "J.P" Valkenheiser	Dan Aykroyd	
1991	Nothing but Trouble	Bobo	Dan Aykroyd	
1992	Batman Returns	Oswald Cobblepot / The Penguin	Danny DeVito	
1992	Hoffa	Bobby Ciaro	Danny DeVito	
1993	Sister Act 2: Back in the Habit	Father Ignatius	Michael Jeter	
1993	Jack the Bear	John Leary	Danny DeVito	
1993	Body of Evidence	Robert Garrett	Joe Mantegna	
1993	The Man Without a Face	Dr. Lionel Talbot	Zach Grenier	
1994	Star Trek Generations	Montgomery "Scotty" Scott	James Doohan	
1994	The Next Karate Kid	Mr. Miyagi	Pat Morita	
1994	Junior	Dr. Larry Arbogast	Danny DeVito	
1994	Naked Gun 33 1/3: The Final Insult	Dr. Eisendrath	Earl Boen	
1994	Drop Zone	Earl Leedy	Michael Jeter	
1994	Baby's Day Out	Edgar "Eddie" Mauser	Joe Mantegna	
1994	True Lies	Albert "Gib" Gibson	Tom Arnold	
1994	Léon: The Professional	Tony	Danny Aiello	
1994	There Goes My Baby	Pop	Seymour Cassel	
1995	Nine Months	Marty Dwyer	Tom Arnold	
1995	Braveheart	Robert de Brus	Ian Bannen	
1995	The Quick and the Dead	Horace	Pat Hingle	
1996	Spy Hard	The Director	Charles Durning	
1996	Matilda	Harry Wormwood	Danny DeVito	
1996	Matilda	Narrator	Danny DeVito	
1996	Mars Attacks!	Rude Gambler	Danny DeVito	
1996	Sleepers	Danny Snyder	Dustin Hoffman	
1996	North Star	Reno	Burt Young	
1996	Up Close & Personal	Dan Duarte	Miguel Sandoval	
1997	Fierce Creatures	Rollo Lee	John Cleese	
1997	L.A. Confidential	Sid Hudgens	Danny DeVito	
1997	The Rainmaker	Deck Shifflet	Danny DeVito	
1997	Wag the Dog	Stanley Motss	Dustin Hoffman	
1997	Alien Resurrection	Dr. Mason Wren	J. E. Freeman	
1997	The Sweet Hereafter	Mitchell Stephens	Ian Holm	
1998	Living Out Loud	Pat Francato	Danny DeVito	
1998	Cousin Bette	Cesar Crevel	Bob Hoskins	
1998	Paulie	Ignacio	Cheech Marin	
1998	Dr. Dolittle	Dr. Gene Reiss	Richard Schiff	
1998	Dr. Dolittle	Dr. Sam Litvack	Steven Gilborn	
1998	Dr. Dolittle	Male Pigeon	Garry Shandling	
1998	The Siege	Frank Haddad	Tony Shalhoub	
1999	Man on the Moon	George Shapiro	Danny DeVito	
1999	King Cobra	Nick "Hash" Hashimoto	Pat Morita	
1999	The Messenger: The Story of Joan of Arc	The Conscience	Dustin Hoffman	
1999	Big Daddy	Arthur Brooks	Josh Mostel	
1999	The World Is Not Enough	R	John Cleese	
1999	The Green Mile	Eduard "Del" Delacroix	Michael Jeter	
1999	Random Hearts	Dick Montoya	Paul Guilfoyle	
1999	Double Jeopardy	Bobby	Jay Brazeau	
1999	The Bachelor	Roy O'Dell	Hal Holbrook	
1999	Bicentennial Man	Dennis Mansky	Stephen Root	
2000	Rules of Engagement	Ambassador Mourain	Ben Kingsley	
2000	Drowning Mona	Wyatt Rash	Danny DeVito	
2000	Esther Kahn	Nathan Quellen	Ian Holm	
2000	Bless the Child	Reverend Grissom	Ian Holm	
2000	O Brother, Where Art Thou?	Pappy O'Daniel	Charles Durning	
2000	Mission: Impossible 2	Dr. Vladimir Nekhorvich	Rade Šerbedžija	
2000	The Gift	Gerald Weems	Michael Jeter	
2000	Taxi 2	Edmond Bertineau	Jean-Christophe Bouvet	
2000	Playing Mona Lisa	Bernie Goldstein	Elliott Gould	
2001	Harry Potter and the Philosopher's Stone	Garrick Ollivander	John Hurt	
2001	From Hell	Sir William Gull	Ian Holm	
2001	What's the Worst That Could Happen?	Max Fairbanks	Danny DeVito	
2001	Heist	Mickey Bergman	Danny DeVito	
2001	Thirteen Ghosts	Cyrus Kriticos	F. Murray Abraham	
2001	Session 9	Bill Griggs	Paul Guilfoyle	
2001	Rat Race	Donald P. Sinclair	John Cleese	
2001	The Curse of the Jade Scorpion	George Bond	Wallace Shawn	
2001	The Tailor of Panama	Harry Pendel	Geoffrey Rush	
2001	America's Sweethearts	Wellness Guide	Alan Arkin	
2002	Moonlight Mile	Ben Floss	Dustin Hoffman	
2002	Die Another Day	Q	John Cleese	
2002	The Adventures of Pluto Nash	James	John Cleese	
2002	Spider-Man	Dr. Mendel Stromm	Ron Perkins	
2002	Austin Powers in Goldmember	Danny DeVito	Danny DeVito	
2002	City by the Sea	Reg Duffy	George Dzundza	
2002	Returner	Dr. Brown	Dean Harrington	
2003	Charlie's Angels: Full Throttle	Alex's father	John Cleese	
2003	Anything Else	Harvey Wexler	Danny DeVito	
2003	Big Fish	Amos Calloway	Danny DeVito	
2003	Levity	Mr. Aguilar	Manuel Aránguiz	
2003	Luther	Johann von Staupitz	Bruno Ganz	
2003	Duplex	Herman	Wallace Shawn	
2003	Confidence	Winston "The King" King	Dustin Hoffman	
2003	Runaway Jury	Wendell Rohr	Dustin Hoffman	
2003	Open Range	Percy	Michael Jeter	
2003	Taxi 3	Gérard Gibert	Bernard Farcy	
2003	Peter Pan	Mr. Smee	Richard Briers	
2004	Hellboy	Trevor Bruttenholm	John Hurt	
2004	Christmas in Love	Brad La Guardia	Danny DeVito	
2004	Vanity Fair	Sir Pitt Crawley the Elder	Bob Hoskins	
2004	Meet the Fockers	Bernie Focker	Dustin Hoffman	
2004	Lemony Snicket's A Series of Unfortunate Events	Critic	Dustin Hoffman	
2004	Monty Python's The Meaning of Life	Various roles (2004 redub)	John Cleese	
2004	Around the World in 80 Days	Grizzled Sergeant	John Cleese	
2004	Melinda and Melinda	Sy	Wallace Shawn	
2004	The Bridesmaid	Gérard Courtois	Bernard Le Coq	
2004	Christmas with the Kranks	Officer Salino	Cheech Marin	
2005	Dreamer	Pop Crane	Kris Kristofferson	
2005	The Lost City	Meyer Lansky	Dustin Hoffman	
2005	Stay	Dr. Leon Patterson	Bob Hoskins	
2005	Where the Truth Lies	Sally Sanmarco	Maury Chaykin	
2005	Transamerica	Calvin Many Goats	Graham Greene	
2005	Missing	Andrew Babcock (2005 redub)	Richard Bradford	
2006	Miss Potter	Rupert Potter	Bill Paterson	
2006	O Jerusalem	David Ben-Gurion	Ian Holm	
2006	Spymate	Kiro Sensei	Pat Morita	
2006	Even Money	Walter	Danny DeVito	
2006	Relative Strangers	Frank Menure	Danny DeVito	
2006	10 Items or Less	Big D	Danny DeVito	
2006	Deck the Halls	Buddy Hall	Danny DeVito	
2006	Man About Town	Dr. Primkin	John Cleese	
2006	Perfume: The Story of a Murderer	Giuseppe Baldini	Dustin Hoffman	
2006	The Holiday	Dustin Hoffman	Dustin Hoffman	
2006	Stranger than Fiction	Professor Jules Hilbert	Dustin Hoffman	
2006	Unknown	Bound Man / Brockman	Joe Pantoliano	
2006	The Illusionist	Josef Fischer	Eddie Marsan	
2007	The Good Night	Mel	Danny DeVito	
2007	Reno 911!: Miami	District Attorney	Danny DeVito	
2007	Nobel Son	George Gastner	Danny DeVito	
2007	Charlie Wilson's War	Clarence "Doc" Long	Ned Beatty	
2007	Taxi 4	Gérard Gibert	Bernard Farcy	
2007	Spider-Man 3	Captain George Stacy	James Cromwell	
2007	Becoming Jane	George Austen	James Cromwell	
2007	Mr. Magorium's Wonder Emporium	Edward Magorium	Dustin Hoffman	
2007	Battle in Seattle	Dr. Meric	Rade Šerbedžija	
2007	The Godfather	Peter Clemenza (2007 redub)	Richard S. Castellano	
2008	Hellboy II: The Golden Army	Trevor Bruttenholm	John Hurt	
2009	The Pink Panther 2	Charles Dreyfus	John Cleese	
2009	Sherlock Holmes	Captain Tanner	Clive Russell	
2009	House Broken	Tom Cathkart	Danny DeVito	
2009	Solitary Man	Jimmy Marino	Danny DeVito	
2009	Surrogates	Older Canter	James Cromwell	
2009	Race to Witch Mountain	Dr. Donald Harlan	Garry Marshall	
2010	Barney's Version	Izzy Panofsky	Dustin Hoffman	
2010	Little Fockers	Bernie Focker	Dustin Hoffman	
2010	When in Rome	Al Russo	Danny DeVito	
2010	Harry Potter and the Deathly Hallows – Part 1	Garrick Ollivander	John Hurt	
2010	Furry Vengeance	Dr. Christian Burr	Wallace Shawn	
2010	Made in Dagenham	Albert Passingham	Bob Hoskins	
2011	Harry Potter and the Deathly Hallows – Part 2	Garrick Ollivander	John Hurt	
2011	Melancholia	Dexter	John Hurt	
2011	Tinker Tailor Soldier Spy	Control	John Hurt	
2012	The Amazing Spider-Man	Gustav Fiers / Gentleman	Michael Massee	
2012	The Dream Team	Foucher	André Penvern	
2013	Admission	Clarence	Wallace Shawn	
2013	Snowpiercer	Gilliam	John Hurt	
2013	Only Lovers Left Alive	Christopher Marlowe	John Hurt	
2013	The Lone Ranger	Chief Big Bear	Saginaw Grant	
2014	Interstellar	Donald	John Lithgow	
2014	Chef	Riva	Dustin Hoffman	
2014	The Cobbler	Abraham Simkin	Dustin Hoffman	
2014	Boychoir	Anton Carvelle	Dustin Hoffman	
2014	The Amazing Spider-Man 2	Gustav Fiers / Gentleman	Michael Massee	
2015	The Program	Bob Hamman	Dustin Hoffman	
2016	Wiener-Dog	Dave Schmerz	Danny DeVito	
2016	Café Society	Marty Dorfman	Ken Stott	
2017	The Meyerowitz Stories	Harold Meyerowitz	Dustin Hoffman	
2018	The Favourite	Sidney Godolphin	James Smith	
2019	Dumbo	Max Medici	Danny DeVito	
2019	Jumanji: The Next Level	Eddie Gilpin	Danny DeVito	
2019	Marriage Story	Frank	Wallace Shawn	
2019	Into the Labyrinth	Dr. Green	Dustin Hoffman	
2020	Rifkin's Festival	Mort Rifkin	Wallace Shawn	

==== Television (Animation, Italian dub) ====
Year	Title	Role(s)	Notes	Ref
1973–1974	Emergency +4	Roy DeSoto	Main cast	
1988	Yogi and the Invasion of the Space Bears	Ranger Smith	TV film	
1990	Yogi's Treasure Hunt	Ranger Smith	Main cast	
1992	Raw Toonage	Scrooge McDuck	Guest role	
1995	Gargoyles	Travis Marshall	Guest role	
1995–2021	The Simpsons	Various characters	Recurring role	
1996	Animaniacs	Ivan Bloski	2 episodes	
1996	Animaniacs	Professor Otto von Schnitzelpusskrankengescheitmeyer	2 episodes	
1999–2000	Mickey Mouse Works	Scrooge McDuck	Recurring role	
1999–2013	Futurama	Scruffy Scruffington	Recurring role (seasons 4x18, 6–7)	
1999–2013	Futurama	Various characters	Recurring role	
2000–2002	Teacher's Pet	Pretty Boy	Main cast	
2000–2005	South Park	Jimbo Kearn	Recurring role (seasons 1–4)	
2001	The 13 Ghosts of Scooby-Doo	Weerd	Recurring role	
2001–2003	House of Mouse	Scrooge McDuck	Recurring role	
2005–2006	King Arthur's Disasters	King Arthur	Main cast	
2005–2009	American Dragon: Jake Long	Luong Lao Shi	Main cast	
2015–2018	Mickey Mouse	Scrooge McDuck	Recurring role	

==== Television (Live action, Italian dub) ====
Year	Title	Role(s)	Notes	Original actor	Ref
1973-1979	El Chavo del Ocho	Quico	Main cast	Carlos Villagrán	
1990	Vendetta: Secrets of a Mafia Bride	Vincent Dominici	TV miniseries	Burt Young	
1991	Twin Peaks	Dr. Lawrence Jacoby	Recurring role	Russ Tamblyn	
1992	Zorro	Sergeant Garcia	Main role (1992 redub)	Henry Calvin	
1993–1996	The Fresh Prince of Bel-Air	Geoffrey Butler	Main cast	Joseph Marcell	
1994–2003	Friends	David	4 episodes	Hank Azaria	
1994–2003	Friends	Mr. Heckles	4 episodes	Larry Hankin	
1994–2003	Friends	Steve	2 episodes	Jon Lovitz	
1996	The Sunshine Boys	Al Lewis	TV film	Woody Allen	
2000	The Last of the Blonde Bombshells	Patrick	TV film	Ian Holm	
2007	Full of It	Principal Marcus Hayes	TV film	Derek McGrath	
2008–2019	It's Always Sunny in Philadelphia	Frank Reynolds	Main cast (seasons 2–13)	Danny DeVito	
2011	Neverland	Mr. Smee	TV miniseries	Bob Hoskins	
2012	The Confession	Priest	TV webseries	John Hurt	
2015	The Last Panthers	Tom Kendle	Main cast	John Hurt	
2018–2021	Young Sheldon	Dr. John Sturgis	Recurring role (seasons 1–3)	Wallace Shawn	
2021	Luck	Chester "Ace" Bernstein	Main cast	Dustin Hoffman	

==== Video games (Italian dub) ====
Year	Title	Role(s)	Ref
2005	Chicken Little	Buck "Ace" Cluck	
2010	Fable III	Jasper	
