= Tullio Solenghi =

Italian actor, director, comedian, television personality and impressionist

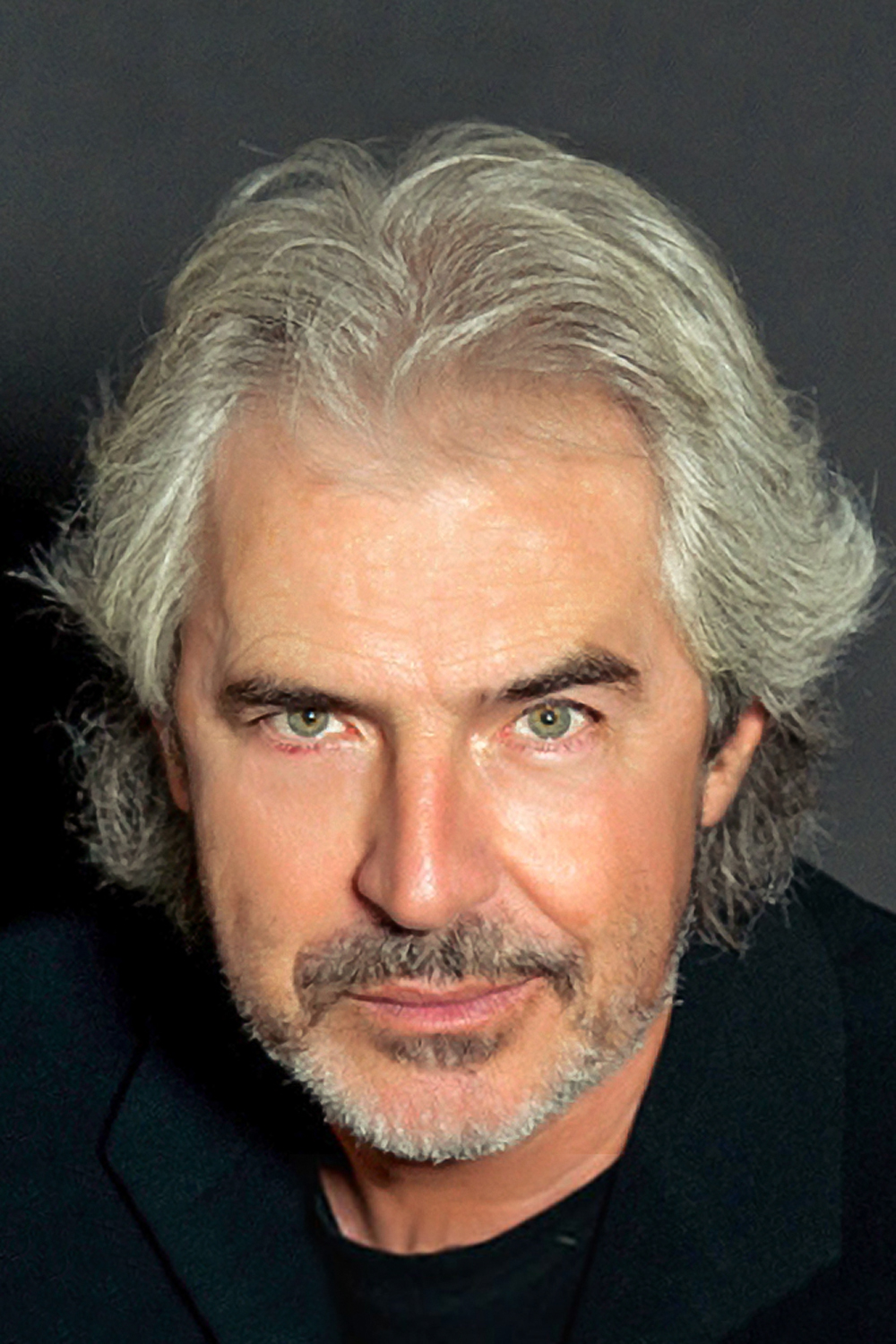
- Born: Tullio Alberto Gianfranco Solenghi; 21 March 1948 (age 78); Genoa, Italy
- Occupations: Actor; comedian; television personality; theatre director; impressionist; voice actor
- Years active: 1970–present
- Spouse: Laura Fiandra
- Children: 2

Tullio Alberto Gianfranco Solenghi (born 21 March 1948) is an Italian actor, director, comedian, television personality and impressionist.

Together with fellow actors Anna Marchesini and Massimo Lopez, he has been a member of the comic group known as Il Trio (The Trio).

== Biography ==
At the age of 17, Solenghi attended the Genoa Stable Theater School, where he met Massimo Lopez and in 1970 he began his acting career. After several experiences on stage and in TV, Solenghi founded Il Trio in 1982 with Lopez and Anna Marchesini: the Trio debuts on Rai Radio 2 with the Hellzapoppin radio show.

Following the great success of Hellzapoppin, the Trio participated in various television programs like Domenica in and the 1986 edition of Fantastico, where Solenghi brought on stage an imitation of the Ayatollah Khomeini, an imitation that provoked international reactions and death threats to Solenghi by Islamic fundamentalists. The Trio came back on TV at the Sanremo Music Festival editions of 1986, 1987 and 1989.

In 1990, the Trio reaches the peak of success with the parody of Alessandro Manzoni's The Betrothed, which was broadcast on Rai 1 in 5 episodes. Together with Lopez and Marchesini, Solenghi brought on stage two theatrical shows: Allacciare le cinture di sicurezza (Fasten your seat belts) in 1987 and In principio era il trio (In the Beginning, there was the Trio) in 1990.

The Trio dissolved in 1994, due to the will of all three actors to work as soloists, but reunited for one last time in 2008 to celebrate its 25th anniversary with the TV-program Non esiste più la mezza stagione.

In 1998, Solenghi hosted Domenica in together with Giancarlo Magalli, and hosted Striscia la notizia in 1996 and 1997 with Gene Gnocchi and in 2005 with his friend Lopez. He additionally hosted the David di Donatello Award ceremonies of 2007, 2008, 2010, 2011, 2012 and 2015.

As a voice actor, Solenghi provided the Italian voice of Scar in the 1994 animated film The Lion King. Although he rarely explores voice dubbing as a vocation, he has given his voice to other animated characters in films such as Casper: A Spirited Beginning.

=== Personal life ===
Tullio Solenghi is married to Laura Fiandra and they have two daughters, Alice and Margherita; he got married in church although he is an atheist.

== Filmography ==
=== Cinema ===
- Io zombo, tu zombi, lei zomba (1979)
- La moglie in vacanza... l'amante in città (1980)
- La gorilla (1982)
- The Blue Collar Worker and the Hairdresser in a Whirl of Sex and Politics (1996)
- What a Beautiful Day (2011)
- Where Storks Dare (2025)

== Television ==
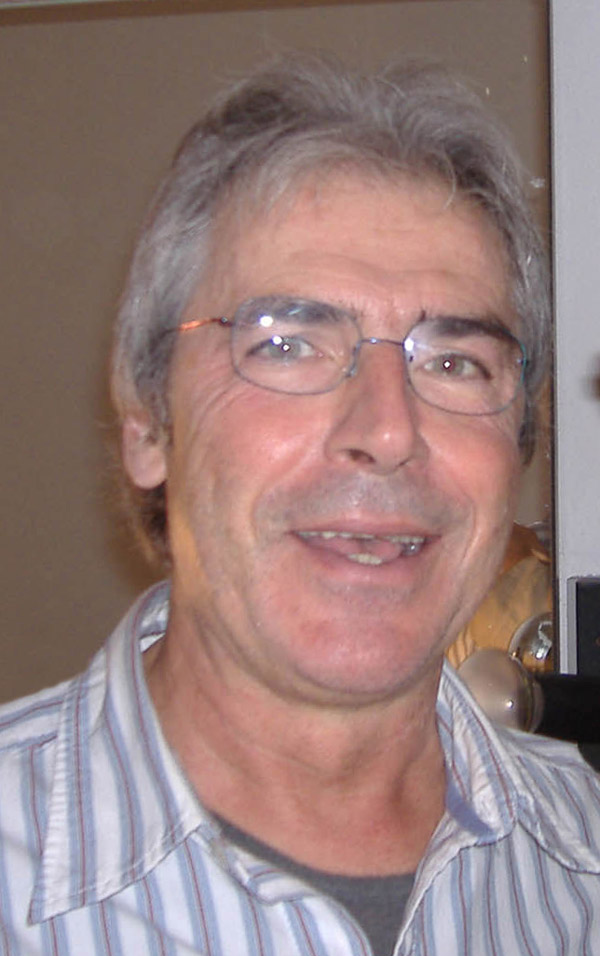
Solenghi in 2017 at Teatro Carcano, Milan.

=== With the Trio ===
- Domenica in (1985–1986)
- Fantastico (1986–1987)
- Sanremo Music Festival 1986 (1986)
- Sanremo Music Festival 1987 (1987)
- Sanremo Music Festival 1989 (1989)
- Non esiste più la mezza stagione (2008)

=== As soloist ===
- Striscia la notizia (1996–1997, 2005)
- Domenica in (1998)
- David di Donatello Award Ceremony (2007–2008, 2010–2012, 2015)
- Miss Italia Show (2018)

== Dubbing roles ==
=== Animation ===
- Scar in The Lion King
- Snivel in Casper: A Spirited Beginning
- The King in A Monkey's Tale
- Christopher Columbus in The Magic Voyage
- Legantir in Justin and the Knights of Valour
- Holm in Otto the Rhino
