= Lapo De Carlo =

Italian sports journalist and presenter

Lapo de Carlo
- Born: Lapo Gianni Augusto De Carlo; 4 December 1968 (age 57); Milan, Italy
- Occupations: Journalist, Radio Host, Teacher
- Family: Adriano de Carlo (father)

Lapo de Carlo (born 4 December 1968) is an Italian sports journalist and presenter. Former director of the sport/talk radio station Radio Milan Inter, he is current chair of Radio Nerazzurra and Linterista.it. He also worked for Radio CNR, Radio Italia Network, Radio Donna and Radio Via Montenapoleone. He hosts a daily afternoon sport show on the Italian all news station Giornale Radio, Giornale Radio Football Club

Since 2008, he has been a consultant in public speaking at the University of Milan Bicocca at the Faculty of Psychology.

He also works as regular guest of one of the main Italian sport tv program, Qui studio a voi stadio, since 2013.

He is the son of the writer Adriano de Carlo.
