= Heather Parisi =

American-Italian dancer, singer, and TV host (born 1960)

- Born: Heather Elizabeth Parisi; January 27, 1960 (age 66); Los Angeles, California, U.S.
- Occupations: Dancer; showgirl; television personality; singer; film director
- Spouse(s): Giorgio Manenti (m. 1993; div. 1999); Umberto Maria Anzolin (m. 2013)
- Children: 4

Heather Elizabeth Parisi (born January 27, 1960) is an American-born Italian dancer, singer and television personality. She was one of the most popular personalities on Italian television from the late 1970s to the 1990s. As of 2011, she and her family mainly live in Hong Kong.

== Life and career ==
Born in Los Angeles, Parisi worked for the San Francisco Ballet and the American Ballet Theatre in New York City. During a vacation in Italy, she was noticed by choreographer Franco Miseria, who had her audition for RAI. In 1979, Parisi debuted on the show Luna Park, hosted by Pippo Baudo.

Her rise as a television star took place in the fall of the same year in the first edition of the Saturday night show Fantastico, which had high ratings (average of 23.6 million viewers). In each episode, Parisi performed a ballet and interpreted the opening song "Disco Bambina." The song became a hit, peaking several weeks at No. 1 on the Italian hit parade.

Parisi was cast in four more editions of Fantastico and in other successful variety shows, and had other musical hits including "Cicale," which ranked first on the hit parade for four weeks between 1981 and 1982. She slowed down her activities in the mid-'90s.

During the COVID-19 pandemic, Parisi chose to remain unvaccinated. On her website in December 2021, Parisi logged an entry entitled "Damned for Eternity" in which she told women that they "should be ashamed" of having children vaccinated against COVID-19 and that it was "criminal". In a different post, Parisi said, "For me, being socially responsible is one of the most overestimated virtues."

== Filmography ==
=== As an actress ===
Year	Title	Role	Notes
1986	Grandi magazzini	Dolly	Film debut
1999	A Midsummer Night's Dream	Nick's wife	

=== As a director and screenwriter ===
Year	Title	Role	Notes
2009	Blind Maze	None	Debut as a director and screenwriter

=== Other appearances ===
Year	Title	Role	Notes
1979	Luna Park	Herself/ Dancer	Television debut; variety show
1979–1988	Fantastico	Herself/ Dancer	Variety show (seasons 1–5, 8)
1981	Stasera niente di nuovo	Herself/ Dancer	Variety show
1983	Al Paradise	Herself/ Co-host	Variety show (season 1)
1987	Pronto Topolino?	Herself/ Co-Host/ Dancer	Variety show
1988	Contigo Televisión Española	Herself/ Co-Host/ Dancer	Variery show
1989	Telegatto 1989	Herself/ Co-host	Annual ceremony
1989	Un disco per l'estate 1989	Herself/ Host	Annual music festival
1989–1990	Finalmente venerdì	Herself/ Co-host	Variety show
1991	Stasera mi butto	Herself/ Co-host	Talent show (season 2)
1991–1992	Ciao Weekend	Herself/ Co-host	Variety show
1993	VIP 93 Telecinco España	Herself/ Co-Host/ Dancer	Variety show
1993	Bellezze al bagno	Herself/ Host	Game show (season 5)
1995	Castrocaro Music Festival	Herself/ Co-host	Annual music festival
1995–1996	Arriba!!! Arriba!!!	Herself/ Host	Children's program
2002–2003	Zecchino d'Oro	Herself/ Host	Talent show (seasons 45–46)
2003–2004	Domenica In	Herself/ Co-host	Talk show (season 28)
2004	Miss Italia 2004	Herself/ Judge	Annual beauty contest
2005–2006	Ballando con le Stelle	Herself/ Judge	Talent show (seasons 1–2)
2016	Nemicamatissima	Herself/ Host	Variety show
2018	Amici di Maria De Filippi	Herself/ Judge	Talent show (season 17)

== Discography ==
Album

- 1981 - Cicale & Company (CGD, CGD 20276)
- 1983 - Ginnastica fantastica (Polydor, 815 721 1)
- 1983 - Il fantastico mondo di Heather Parisi (reprint of Cicale & Company with three new songs)
- 1991 - HP (Mercury, 846 417-1)
- 1991 - Io, Pinocchio (Mercury, 510 738-2)

Singles

- 1979 - Disco bambina/Blackout (CGD, CGD 10200)
- 1981 - Ti rockerò/Lucky girl (CGD, CGD 10302)
- 1981 - Cicale/Mr. pulce (CGD, CGD 10349)
- 1981 - Quando i grilli cantano (CGD, CGD YD 601) promo juke box
- 1983 - Radiostelle/Alle corde (CGD, CGD 10456)
- 1983 - Ceralacca/Raghjayda (Polydor, 815-750-7)
- 1984 - Crilù/No words (Polydor, 881-420-7)
- 1984 - Ciao ciao/Maschio (Polydor, 821697-7)
- 1985 - Crilù in Bangkok/Morning in Tokyo (Polydor, 881 924-1, 12") (as Angel Program)
- 1986 - Teleblù/Videolips (Polydor, 883-952-7)
- 1987 - Dolceamaro/All'ultimo respiro (Polydor, 887-180-7)
- 1987 - Baby come back/I'm hot (White Records, 109 428)
- 1989 - Faccia a faccia/Feelings come and go (Polydor, 871-572-7)
- 1989 - Livido/Livido (Instrumental Version) (Polydor, 873-192-7)
- 1991 - Pinocchio/Se te ne vai (Polydor, 866 194 7)
