= Qui studio a voi stadio =

1987 Italian sports TV series

- Presented by: Fabio Ravezzani
- Country of origin: Italy

Production
- Production locations: Milan, Italy
- Running time: 3–4 hours

Original release
- Network: Telelombardia
- Release: 1987

Qui studio a voi stadio (known also by the acronym QSVS) is a sports talk and debate television program produced by Telelombardia. It aired on various affiliated local television channels in Italy, entirely devoted to Italian Soccer, in particular the Serie A.

== Notable commentators and presenters ==
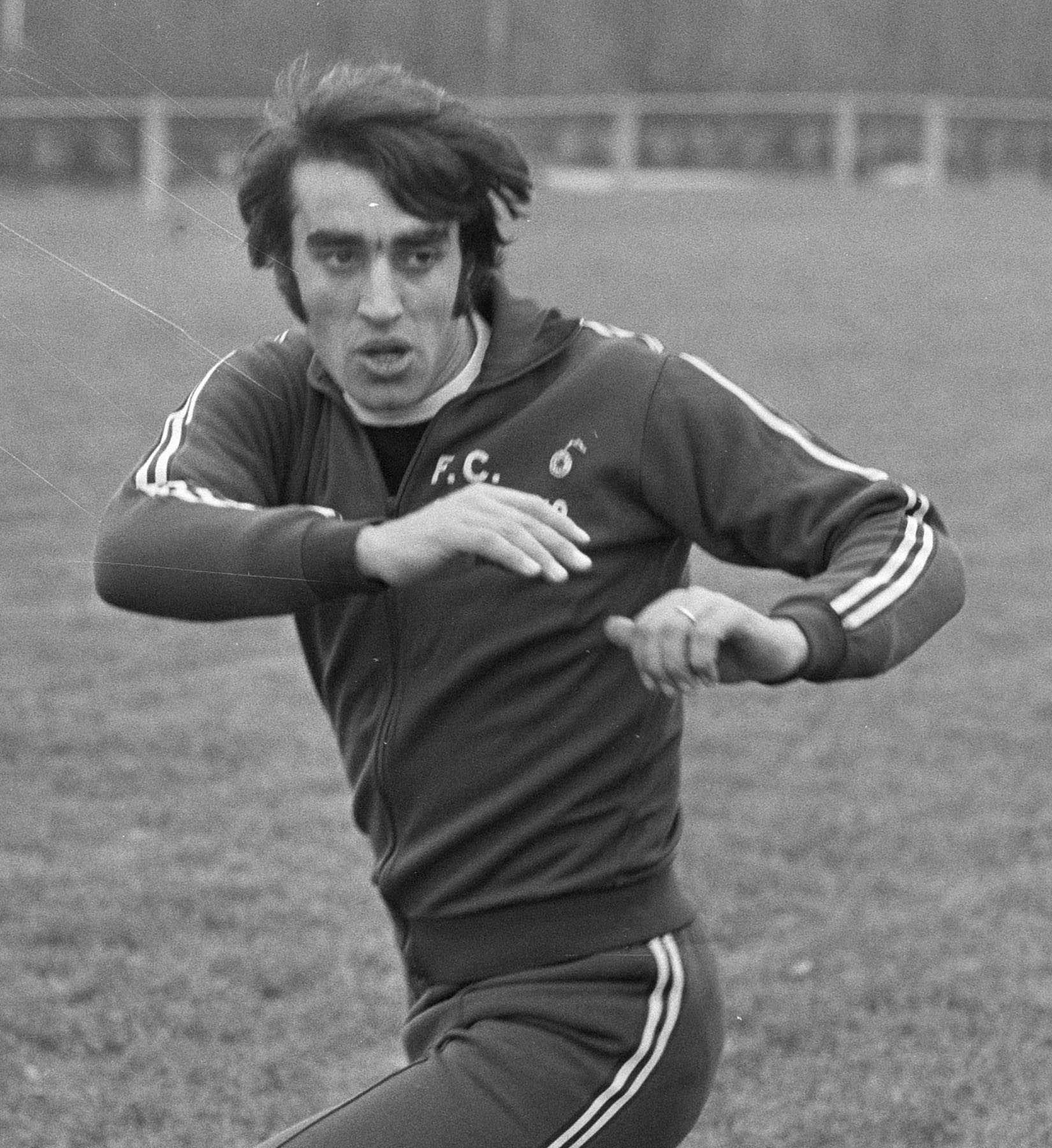
Pietro Anastasi in 1971 when he was a football player

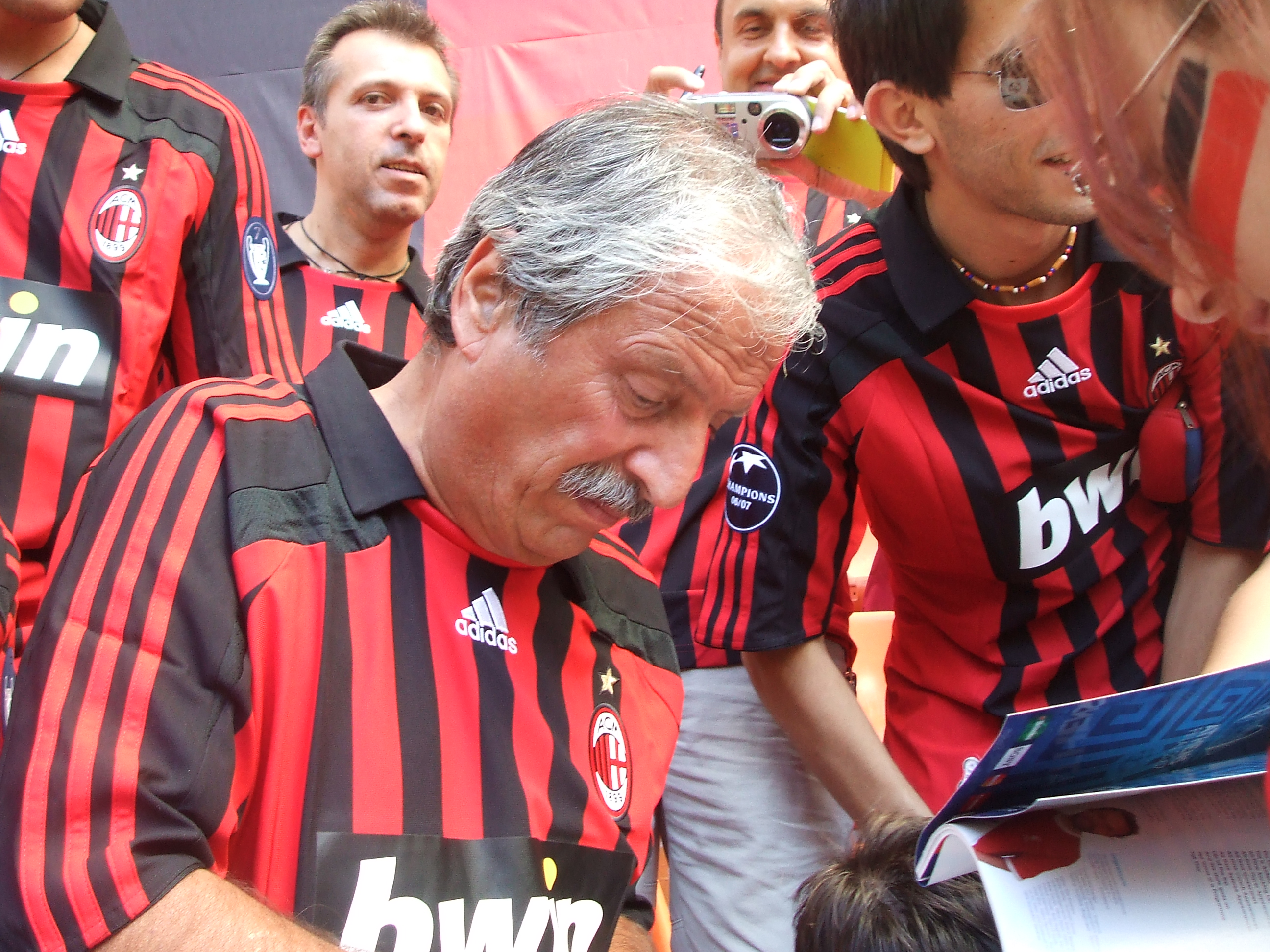
Tiziano Crudeli in 2008

QSVS has had many commentators and presenters during its run. This list includes notable current and former commentators and presenters.

- Fabio Ravezzani
- Gian Luca Rossi
- Cristiano Ruiu
- Lapo De Carlo
- Alfio Musmarra
- Luigi Furini
- Stefano Donati
- Paola Ferrari
- Maurizio Mosca
- Tiziano Crudeli
- Evaristo Beccalossi
- David Messina
- Umberto Colombo
- Carlo Pellegatti
- Davide Fontolan
- Mauro Bellugi
- Pietro Anastasi
- Mario Ielpo
- Michelangelo Rampulla
- Claudio Lippi
- Mauro di Francesco
- Domenico Marocchino
