= Alfio Musmarra =

Italian sports journalist (born 1976)

- Born: 30 May 1976 (age 49); Taurianova, Italy

Alfio Musmarra (born 30 May 1976 in Taurianova, Italy) is an Italian sports journalist and TV presenter of Qui studio a voi stadio.
