= Quelli della notte =

1985 Italian television late night variety show

Quelli della notte is an Italian late night variety show, broadcast on Rai 2 in 1985.

== Overview ==
Created and hosted by Renzo Arbore, it lasted 33 episodes. A parody of serious talk shows, it started with an audience of 800,000 people and raised up to 3 million and a 51% share. Its cast included Nino Frassica, Maurizio Ferrini, Riccardo Pazzaglia, Marisa Laurito, Roberto D'Agostino, Simona Marchini, Giorgio Bracardi, Massimo Catalano, Gianni Mazza. Andy Luotto, who played an Arabic character, Sheik Harmand, following a protest by the Association of Italian Muslims and some serious threats, was forced to abandon the show after a few episodes.
