= Eden TV =

- Country: Italy
- Broadcast area: Northern Italy

Programming
- Language(s): Italian
- Picture format: 4:3 SDTV

Ownership
- Owner: G.R.2000 srl

History
- Launched: 1987

Links
- Website: http://www.edentv.it/

Availability

Terrestrial
- Digital: LCN 86

Eden TV is an Italian regional television channel of Veneto owned by G.R.2000 srl group. It transmits a light entertainment program: movies, news and weather bulletins, documentary film and sports on LCN 86.

Other channels in the group are Eden 2, Arancio, New Generation Tv and Eden 5.

== Programs in Italian ==
- Tg Treviso
- Mercatino
- Vie verdi
- Hard Trek
- Ufo channel
- Veneto News
- Salute e società
- On Race Tv
- Adnkronos rotocalco
- Epoca che storia
- La Tenda Tv
- Verde a Nordest
- Sport e motori
- Video motori
- Superpass
- Salus TV
- Book Generation
- Danza Tv
- Bouquet Tv
- Made in Italy
- Coming Soon
- newsmagazineweek
- Sportwinner
- Pianeta oggi Tv
- Super Sea
- Terra nostra
- Vipsciò
- Village

== Staff ==
- Adriana Rasera (owner)
- Rosanna Vettoretti
- Daniele Antoniol
- Nicola Poloniato
