= Edrissa Sanneh =

Senegalese-born Italian television personality and sports journalist (1951–2023)

- Born: 2 January 1951; Brufut, Gambia Colony and Protectorate
- Died: 4 August 2023 (aged 72); Brescia, Italy
- Occupation(s): TV personality, sports journalist

Edrissa Sanneh (2 January 1951 – 4 August 2023), more commonly known as Idris, was a Gambian-born Italian television personality and a sports journalist. Because of his passionate, enthusiastic, and unique football commentary, Idris became something of a celebrity in Italy. He was a supporter of Juventus.
