= Fabio Ravezzani =

Italian sports journalist and TV presenter (born 1960)

- Born: February 24, 1960; Milan, Italy
- Occupations: Journalist; TV presenter; TV director
- Years active: 1999–present
- Known for: Qui studio a voi stadio

Fabio Ravezzani (born February 24, 1960) is an Italian sports journalist, TV director, and the TV presenter of Qui studio a voi stadio.
