= Bruno Pizzul =

Italian journalist and footballer (1938–2025)

Bruno Pizzul OMRI
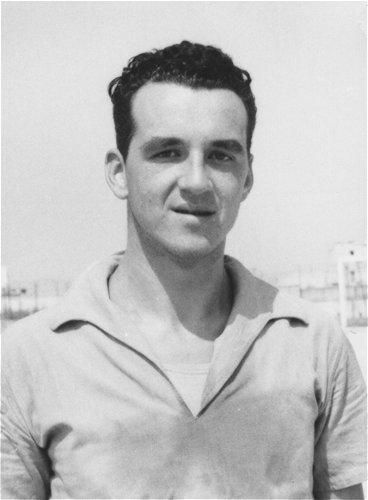
- Pizzul in 1958

Personal information
- Date of birth: 8 March 1938
- Place of birth: Udine, Italy
- Date of death: 5 March 2025 (aged 86)
- Place of death: Gorizia, Italy
- Height: 1.93 m (6 ft 4 in)
- Position: Midfielder

Senior career*
Years	Team	Apps	(Gls)
–1958	Pro Gorizia		
1958–1960	Catania		
1960–1961	Ischia	5	(0)
1961–196?	Catania		
196?	Cremonese		
- * Club domestic league appearances and goals

Bruno Pizzul OMRI (Italian pronunciation: [ˈbruːno ˈpittsul]; 8 March 1938 – 5 March 2025) was an Italian sports journalist and television commentator, as well as a former professional football player. He was best known for serving as the main television commentator for matches involving the Italy national football team from 1986 to 2002.

== Football career ==
Born in Udine, Pizzul began his football career at an amateur club in Cormons, a town in the Province of Gorizia. Between the late 1950s and the early 1960s, he played professionally as a midfielder for Pro Gorizia, Catania, Ischia and Cremonese.

== Career in journalism ==
Graduated in law, Pizzul was hired in 1969 by RAI, the Italian public service broadcaster, as a sports commentator. His first match commentary was Juventus–Bologna in the 1969–70 Coppa Italia, while his first international match was the UEFA Euro 1972 Final between the Soviet Union and West Germany. In 1986, starting with the 1986 FIFA World Cup in Mexico, he became the main television commentator for the Italy national football team, succeeding Nando Martellini.

He held this role until 21 August 2002, when he commentated on his final Italy match, a friendly against Slovenia played in Trieste, which Italy lost 1–0.

After leaving RAI, Pizzul worked for La7 in 2007, commentating rebroadcasts of Italy's matches at the 2006 FIFA World Cup and several matches of the 2007–08 Coppa Italia.

== Film ==
Pizzul appeared as himself in the Italian 1974 film L'arbitro (lit. 'The Referee'), directed by Luigi Filippo D'Amico, alongside Lando Buzzanca and Joan Collins.

In 1996, he provided voice narration in the final scenes of the film Fantozzi – Il ritorno, directed by Neri Parenti and starring Paolo Villaggio.

== Personal life and death ==
Pizzul was married to Maria and had three children—Fabio, Silvia and Carla—as well as eleven grandchildren.

He identified as Roman Catholic. On 2 June 2022, he was awarded the title of Commander of the Order of Merit of the Italian Republic.

Pizzul died on 5 March 2025, three days before his 87th birthday. AC Milan commemorated him as the voice of their historic 4–0 victory over FC Barcelona in the 1994 UEFA Champions League final, which he commentated on Italian public television.

A supporter of Torino, Pizzul was honoured by the club during a match against Parma, with the team wearing a special commemorative patch featuring one of his quotes dedicated to the club. Udinese also paid tribute to him by wearing black armbands during their match against Lazio.
