= Fantastico (TV program) =

- Genre: Variety show
- Directed by: Enzo Trapani; Luigi Bonori; Gino Landi; Fuorio Angiolella; Sergio Japino; Giancarlo Nicotra
- Country of origin: Italy
- Original language: Italian
- No. of seasons: 13
- No. of episodes: 180 (+3 specials)

Original release
- Network: Rai 1
- Release: October 6, 1979 – January 5, 1980
- Release: October 3, 1981 – January 6, 1992
- Release: October 4, 1997 – January 6, 1998

Fantastico is an Italian Saturday night variety show broadcast by Rai 1 from 1979 to 1991, with an interruption in 1980, when it was replaced by the game show Scacco Matto. The television program was linked with the Italian national lottery, and every edition consisted of thirteen episodes with the final episode being broadcast on 6 January, with the extraction of the winning tickets.

The show was generally different in its structure from one edition to another; the first edition was seen by an average of 23.6 million viewers. During the years the ratings dropped, and after a disappointing edition hosted by Raffaella Carrà and Johnny Dorelli (7.8 million viewers), the show was replaced by the variety-quiz Scommettiamo che?.

An attempt to revive the show was made in 1997, but Fantastico Enrico (so titled as a reference to the presenter Enrico Montesano) obtained low ratings and Montesano eventually abandoned the show.

Several opening songs of the show charted, and two of them (Heather Parisi's "Disco Bambina" and "Cicale") peaked first at the Italian hit parade.

== Editions ==
#	Year	Presenters
1	1979	Loretta Goggi with Beppe Grillo and Heather Parisi
2	1981	Walter Chiari, Oriella Dorella, Heather Parisi, Romina Power, Memo Remigi, Gigi Sabani and Claudio Cecchetto
3	1982	Corrado and Raffaella Carrà with Gigi Sabani and Renato Zero
4	1983	Gigi Proietti with Heather Parisi and Teresa De Sio
5	1984	Pippo Baudo with Heather Parisi, Eleonora Brigliadori and José Luis Moreno
6	1985	Pippo Baudo with Lorella Cuccarini, Galyn Görg and Beppe Grillo
7	1986	Pippo Baudo with Lorella Cuccarini, Alessandra Martines, the Trio Lopez-Marchesini-Solenghi and Nino Frassica
8	1987	Adriano Celentano with Marisa Laurito, Heather Parisi, Massimo Boldi and Maurizio Micheli
9	1988	Enrico Montesano and Anna Oxa
10	1989	Massimo Ranieri with Anna Oxa, Alessandra Martines, Giancarlo Magalli and Andy Luotto
11	1990	Pippo Baudo with Marisa Laurito, Giorgio Faletti and Jovanotti
12	1991	Raffaella Carrà and Johnny Dorelli, with Gianfranco D'Angelo
