= Giancarlo Magalli =

Italian television presenter

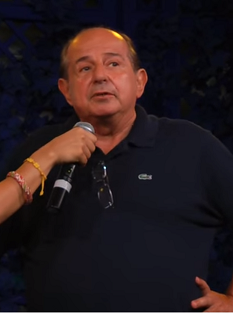
- Magalli in 2015
- Born: 5 July 1947 (age 78); Rome, Italy
- Spouses: Carla Crocivera; Valeria Donati (m. 1989; sep. 2008)
- Children: 2

Giancarlo Magalli (born 5 July 1947) is an Italian television writer, presenter and actor.

== Life and career ==
Born in Rome, Magalli studied at the Istituto Massimiliano Massimo, having Mario Draghi and Luca Cordero di Montezemolo as classmates.

He started his artistic career as an entertainer in the first Italian tourist village at the end of the 1960s. In the seventies he became collaborator of Pippo Franco, writing his monologues. He was contracted as a television writer by RAI in 1977.

In 1985, Magalli debuted as a television presenter with the Rai 1 TV-quiz Pronto chi gioca?. He later hosted several successful TV-programs, including Fantastico, I fatti vostri and Domenica in.

For seven years Magalli has done volunteer work with the municipal police of Rome, of which he is honorary agent, going on patrol two nights a week, receiving the degree of sergeant, then to lieutenant and captain. He is also an honorary carabiniere.

In April 2007, Magalli was appointed Commendatore of the Italian Republic. In January 2015, he ranked first in an Il Fatto Quotidiano poll resulting the preferred candidate to be the successor of Giorgio Napolitano as President of the Italian Republic.

Giancarlo Magalli has married two times and has two daughters; he considers himself Roman Catholic although dubious.

=== Controversy ===
In 2017, Magalli sparked major controversy after insulting co-host Adriana Volpe on air: after she referred to his age, he retorted, "Pijatela in saccoccia te e quelli che non dicono l'età che c'hai te!" (Roman dialect for "Go getting shafted, you and all those not saying how old you are!"). This led to a lawsuit that ended in 2021 with his conviction for aggravated libel. Further tensions continued with provocative social media posts and on-air behavior, including Magalli mocking her TV ratings and refusing to say her surname during a quiz show.
