= Renzo Arbore =

Italian actor

Renzo Arbore Knight Grand Cross OMRI
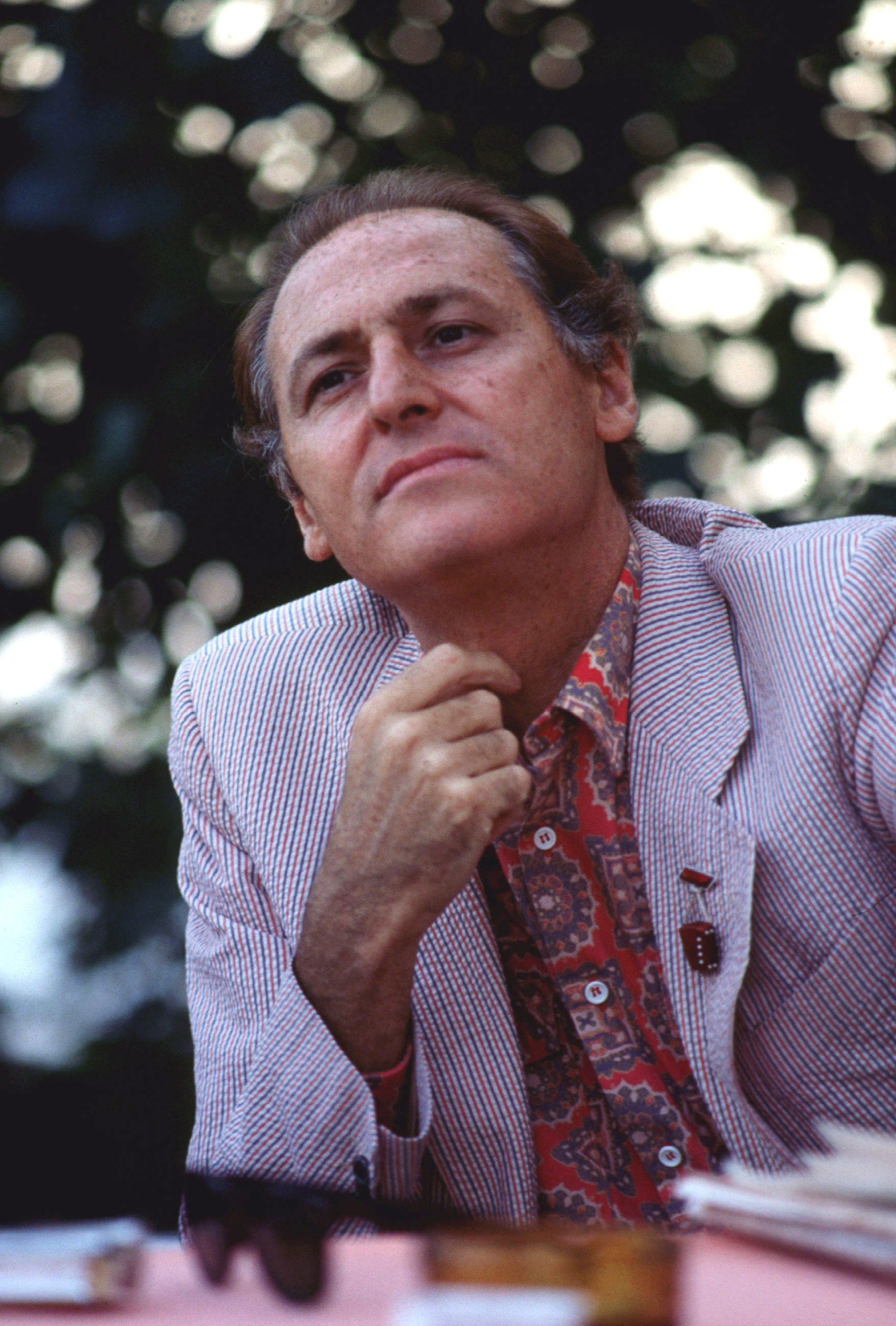
- Arbore in 1983
- Born: Lorenzo Giovanni Arbore; 24 June 1937 (age 89); Foggia, Italy
- Occupations: Television presenter; singer; actor; director
- Years active: 1964–present
- Employer: RAI
- Height: 1.82 m (6 ft 0 in)
- Partner(s): Mariangela Melato (1970s–1980s, 2007–2013)

Lorenzo Giovanni "Renzo" Arbore (Italian pronunciation: [ˈrɛntso ˈarbore]; born 24 June 1937) is an Italian television host, singer, actor and film director.

== Career ==
Arbore became nationally recognized as radio anchor man, together with Gianni Boncompagni, in the late 1960s, with shows such as Bandiera gialla (1965), Per voi giovani (1967), Alto Gradimento (1970), increasingly marked by their ironical approach which later became one of their brands. He debuted in Italian television with Speciale per voi (1969–1970), which included debates about singers of that age. His first great TV success was the surreal L'altra domenica ("The Other Sunday", 1976–1979), in which he launched numerous comedians including Mario Marenco, Isabella Rossellini and Roberto Benigni. Also very successful were Quelli della notte (1985), with Nino Frassica, Riccardo Pazzaglia, Maurizio Ferrini, and Roberto D'Agostino, and Indietro tutta!(1988), again with Frassica, which established Arbore as one of the most intelligent and cult figures of Italian televisions.

In the meantime Arbore wrote and directed the movies Il pap'occhio (1980) and "FF.SS." – Cioè: "...che mi hai portato a fare sopra a Posillipo se non mi vuoi più bene?" (1983), both surreal stories featuring numerous actors launched by him and others friends (including Luciano De Crescenzo, Benigni, Rossellini and many others), set in his adoptive city of Naples. Arbore also played and sang in numerous of his shows, notably in Quelli della Notte and Indietro tutta!, whose music albums sold hundreds of thousand copies in Italy.

An apt amateur clarinet player, in 1991 Arbore founded the Orchestra Italiana, a group of 15 artists with the aim to popularize Neapolitan music worldwide. The orchestra has toured in Europe, Asia, and the Americas. He was also director of the Umbria Jazz festival. His latest TV show is Speciale per me – Meno siamo, meglio stiamo! on Rai Uno.

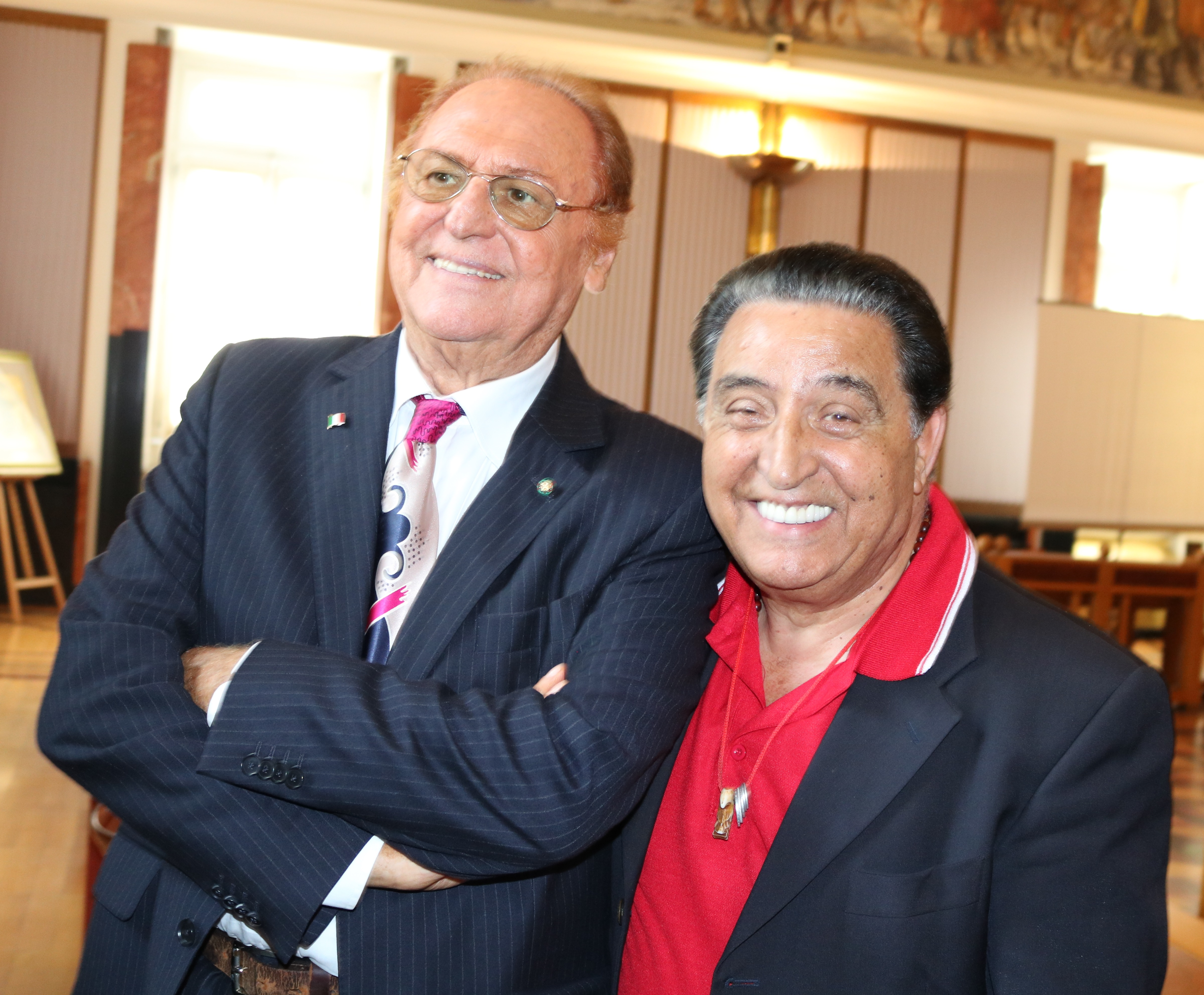
Arbore (left) with Mario Trevi in 2017

Recently, he received the 2010 America Award from the Italy-USA Foundation. In July 2010, Arbore received an Honorary Doctorate of Music from Berklee College of Music. The award was presented at the 25th anniversary of the Umbria Jazz Clinics.

== Honour ==
- Italy: Knight Grand Cross of the Order of Merit of the Italian Republic (3 december 2021)
