= Luciano Rispoli =

Italian television presenter

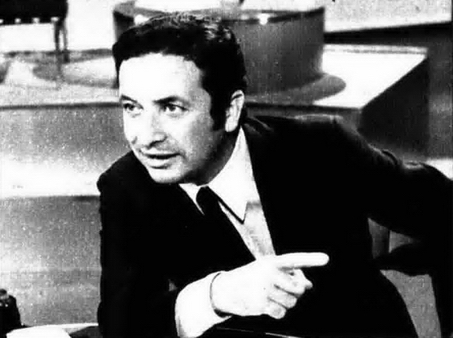
- Rispoli in Radiocorriere magazine, 1975.
- Born: 12 July 1932; Reggio Calabria, Italy
- Died: 26 October 2016 (aged 84); Rome, Italy
- Occupation: Presenter

Luciano Rispoli (12 July 1932 – 26 October 2016) was an Italian television and radio writer and presenter.

Born in Reggio Calabria, the son of a colonel, Rispoli moved to Rome to study law at the Sapienza University, but before graduating, he passed an audition by Vittorio Veltroni to join the newly created RAI in 1954.

A founding father of Italian public television, he conceived and hosted the first TV talk show ever broadcast in Italy - L'ospite delle 2 in 1975 - while his Pranzo in TV was the first Italian dinner talk, in 1983.

In 1960, he debuted as radio presenter with the program La radio per le scuole. Starting from the 1960s, Rispoli held several executive positions on radio and television, and contributed to create popular radio programs such as Bandiera Gialla, Chiamate Roma 3131, La Corrida.

From the 1970s on, he was gradually more active as a TV presenter, getting a personal success as host and author of a quiz show about Italian language, Parola mia (1985–88).

In 1991 Rispoli left RAI and moved to Telemontecarlo, where he hosted the music show La più bella sei tu (1991-2) and Tappeto volante, a long-running talk show broadcast on Telemontecarlo between 1993 and 2000, and later moved to other networks until 2009.
