= Telelombardia =

Italian TV channel

- Type: Broadcast television network
- Country: Italy
- Broadcast area: Italy, Switzerland

Programming
- Picture format: 4:3 SDTV

Ownership
- Owner: Sandro Parenzo

History
- Launched: 1974

Links
- Website: www.telelombardia.it

Availability

Terrestrial
- DTT in Lombardy: Channel 10

Telelombardia (lit. 'Lombardy TV') is a Milan-based Italian local television network that offer entertainment programs, news and weather bulletins, sports and political debates, variety shows and paid programming. In the past it was affiliated to the Tivuitalia circuit.

== History ==
The station was founded in 1975 in Cologno Monzese by Luciano Porilli, an electronics engineer that had previously worked at Magnetti Marelli and subsequently founded Eurolab. Initially, the station planned to operate on cable, but since the technology was unviable, it opted for terrestrial transmissions instead. Its first transmitters were installed at Mount Penice, Mount Gallo and the Euganean Hills. Initially, it used VHF frequencies used to relay TV Koper Capodistria, airing movies while the Yugoslav network was not airing its own programming. Later, Telelombardia began broadcasting on its own UHF transmitters (channels 67, 64, 42 and 28). Quickly, Telelombardia split into two channels, Telelombardia 1 and Telelombardia 2, although its programming was the same, but airing in different time slots. Its first headquarters were located at Cinelandia, where some live-action advertising spots for RAI's Carosello used to be filmed.

== See also ==
- Qui studio a voi stadio
