= Domenica in =

Italian television program

- Genre: Talk show
- Created by: Corrado
- Developed by: Corrado
- Directed by: Roberto Croce; Stefano Vicario
- Presented by: Mara Venier (2018–present)
- Country of origin: Italy
- Original language: Italian
- No. of seasons: 48

Production
- Running time: 360 min (1976−2009); 290 min (2009−2013); 150 min (2013−2016); 100 min (2016−2017); 180 min (2017−2018); 210 min (2018−present)

Original release
- Network: Rai 1
- Release: 3 October 1976 – present

Domenica in is an Italian Sunday long-running television show broadcast by Rai 1 since 1976. During its history, the title was also spelt as Domenica in... and Dom&Nica in.

The show was originally planned to offer to the Italian audience, affected in those years by profound austerity, an alternative to the typical Sunday afternoon trips and outings. It has been the first Italian programme to go well beyond the standard duration of 2 hours and to have a very long running, about six hours from 14:00 to 20:00 A programme which is different in its structure from one edition to another, it consists of different segments reserved for entertainment, interviews, sport, games, journalism.
