= List of Italian journalists =

This is a list of journalists from Italy:

== 20th century ==
=== A–B ===
- Francesco Alberoni
- Barbara Alberti
- Luigi Albertini
- Magdi Allam
- Ilaria Alpi
- Corrado Alvaro
- Giulio Andreotti
- Alberto Angela
- Piero Angela
- Claudio Angelini
- Giovanni Battista Angioletti
- Lucia Annunziata
- Gaetano Arfé
- Bruno Arpaia
- Giovanni Arpino
- Sergio Atzeni
- Corrado Augias
- Enzo Baldoni
- Eugenio Balzan
- Paolo Barnard
- Antonio Barolini
- Ezio Bartalini
- Cesare Battisti
- Roberto Beccantini
- Oliviero Beha
- Maurizio Belpietro
- Arrigo Benedetti
- Stefano Benni
- Enrico Benzing
- Paolo Bertolucci
- Tommaso Besozzi
- Enzo Bettiza
- Alberto Bevilacqua
- Enzo Biagi
- Michele Bianchi
- Luciano Bianciardi
- Fausto Biloslavo
- Aldo Biscardi
- Giorgio Bocca
- Italo Bocchino
- Laura Boldrini
- Carlo Bollino
- Adriano Bolzoni
- Franco Bomprezzi
- Laudomia Bonanni
- Ivanoe Bonomi
- Giuseppe Antonio Borgese
- Roberto Bortoluzzi
- Giovanna Botteri
- Gianni Brera
- Paolo Brera
- Federico Buffa
- Dino Buzzati

=== C–D ===
- Pietro Calabrese
- Piero Calamandrei
- Novella Calligaris
- Achille Campanile
- Candido Cannavò
- Paolo Carbone
- Lianella Carell
- Mario Carli
- Alberto Castagna
- Alberto Cavallari
- Giulio Cerreti
- Gerardo Chiaromonte
- Giulietto Chiesa
- Italo Alighiero Chiusano
- Fausta Cialente
- Antonella Clerici
- Gianni Clerici
- Tristano Codignola
- Massimo Consoli
- Ermanno Corsi
- Maurizio Costanzo
- Tiziano Crudeli
- Maria Cuffaro
- Franco Cuomo
- Susanna Cutini
- Emanuela Da Ros
- Corrado Maria Daclon
- Andrea De Adamich
- Alceste De Ambris
- Augusto De Angelis
- Paolo De Chiesa
- Augusto De Marsanich
- Mauro De Mauro
- Valentina De Poli
- Giuliano De Risi
- Gildo De Stefano
- Dario De Toffoli
- Enrico Deaglio
- Luciano del Castillo
- Ivan Della Mea
- Renzo de' Vidovich
- Tiziano Thomas Dossena

=== E–G ===
- Luigi Einaudi
- Alain Elkann
- Paolo Facchinetti
- Salvatore Falco
- Oriana Fallaci
- Salvatore Farina
- Roberto Farinacci
- Alessandra Farkas
- Claudio Fava
- Giuseppe Fava
- Emilio Fede
- Vittorio Feltri
- Giuliano Ferrara
- Lando Ferretti
- Ennio Flaiano
- Paolo Flores d'Arcais
- Vittorio Foa
- Marco Follini
- Mario Fortunato
- Paolo Fox
- Luigi Freddi
- Mario Furlan
- Milena Gabanelli
- Gigi Garanzini
- Guido M. Gatti
- Alfonso Gatto
- Jas Gawronski
- Roberto Giacobbo
- Oscar Giannino
- Maria Cristina Giongo
- Igino Giordani
- Luca Giurato
- Piero Gobetti
- Gianfranco Goria
- Antonio Gramsci
- Carlo Grande
- Gianni Granzotto
- Ezio Maria Gray
- Gerardo Greco
- Ugo Gregoretti
- Almerigo Grilz
- Mario Gromo
- Lilli Gruber
- Giovannino Guareschi
- Paolo Guzzanti

=== H–M ===
- Daniela Hamaui
- Pietro Ichino
- Pietro Ingrao
- Telesio Interlandi
- Gualtiero Jacopetti
- Rula Jebreal
- Peter Kolosimo
- Alexander Langer
- Carmen Lasorella
- Vincenzo Lavarra
- Domenico Leccisi
- Gad Lerner
- Gianni Letta
- Giuseppe Leuzzi
- Arrigo Levi
- Mimmo Liguoro
- Giovanni Lilliu
- Antonio Locatelli
- Paolo Longo
- Giovanni Lurani
- Maria Antonietta Macciocchi
- Stefano Madia
- Lucio Magri
- Mattias Mainiero
- Maria Majocchi
- Curzio Malaparte
- Franco Maria Malfatti
- Giorgio Manganelli
- Raimondo Manzini
- Rosanna Marani
- Claudio Martelli
- Daniele Mastrogiacomo
- Ezio Mauro
- Viviana Mazza
- Rina Melli
- Giorgia Meloni
- David Messina
- Vittorio Messori
- Paolo Mieli
- Franco Mimmi
- Gianni Minà
- Maurizio Molinari
- Antonio Monda
- Ernesto Teodoro Moneta
- Eugenio Montale
- Indro Montanelli
- Mario Monticelli
- Manlio Morgagni
- Oddino Morgari
- Maurizio Mosca
- Germano Mosconi
- Arnaldo Mussolini
- Benito Mussolini

=== N–Q ===
- Gian Gaspare Napolitano
- Gianluca Attanasio
- Pietro Nenni
- Stanislao Nievo
- Fiamma Nirenstein
- Gabriele Nissim
- Umberto Notari
- Augusto Novelli
- Giuseppe Oddo
- Angelo Oliviero Olivetti
- Alberto Ongaro
- Graziano Origa
- Giancarlo Pallavicini
- Marcello Palmisano
- Marco Pannella
- Michele Pantaleone
- Sergio Panunzio
- Mario Pappagallo
- Goffredo Parise
- Cristina Parodi
- Pier Maria Pasinetti
- Stefania Passaro
- Sandro Paternostro
- Alessandro Pavolini
- Riccardo Pazzaglia
- Carmine Pecorelli
- Carlo Pelanda
- Lea Pericoli
- Nico Perrone
- Sandro Pertini
- Alfonso Perugini
- Arrigo Petacco
- Claudio Petruccioli
- Anna Piaggi
- Giorgio Pini
- Fernanda Pivano
- Irene Pivetti
- Marco Pizzorno
- Bruno Pizzul
- Beniamino Placido
- Roberto Poletti
- Massimo Polidoro
- Mario Praz
- Giuseppe Prezzolini
- Pier Antonio Quarantotti Gambini

=== R–S ===
- Pino Rauti
- Lidia Ravera
- Raffaella Reggi
- Camillo Ricchiardi
- Gianni Riotta
- Lalla Romano
- Sergio Romano
- Luigi Romersa
- Pino Romualdi
- Alberto Ronchey
- Rossana Rossanda
- Ernesto Rossi
- Vittorio Giovanni Rossi
- Edmondo Rossoni
- Gianfranco Rotondi
- Antonio Russo
- Cecilia Sala
- Carlo Salsa
- Luigi Salvatorelli
- Michele Santoro
- Francesca Sanvitale
- Cinzia Sasso
- Eugenio Scalfari
- Edoardo Scarfoglio
- Carlo Scorza
- Matilde Serao
- Clara Sereni
- Barbara Serra
- Michele Serra
- Giacinto Menotti Serrati
- Beppe Severgnini
- Giuliana Sgrena
- Giancarlo Siani
- Renato Simoni
- Marino Sinibaldi
- Antonio Socci
- Adriano Sofri
- Franca Sozzani
- Giovanni Spadolini
- Lamberto Sposini
- Domenico Starnone
- Giampietro Stocco
- Francesco Storace
- Mauro Suttora

=== T–Z ===
- Neliana Tersigni
- Tiziano Terzani
- Silvia Toffanin
- Enzo Tortora
- Gianni Toti
- Marco Travaglio
- Claudio Treves
- Antonello Trombadori
- Gaetano Tumiati
- Augusto Turati
- Filippo Turati
- Luigi Ugolini
- Leo Valiani
- Raf Vallone
- Valerio Varesi
- Vauro Senesi
- Elio Veltri
- Walter Veltroni
- Franco Venturi
- Amleto Vespa
- Bruno Vespa
- Mitì Vigliero Lami
- Demetrio Volcic
- Tullia Zevi
- Alvise Zorzi
- Vittorio Zucconi

== See also ==
- List of Italians
- Lists of journalists
