= Petacci =

Petacci is a surname. Notable people with the surname include:

- Clara Petacci (1912–1945), mistress of Benito Mussolini
- Marcello Petacci (1910–1945), Italian surgeon and businessman and brother of Clara
- Maria Petacci (1923–1991), Italian actress, known as Miriam di San Servolo, and sister of Clara
- Emilio Petacci (1886–1965), Italian film actor
