= Poletti =

Poletti is an Italian and Swiss surname. Holders include (alphabetically):

- Alberto José Poletti (born 1946), Argentine retired footballer
- Bérengère Poletti (born 1959), French politician
- Charles Poletti (1903–2002), American politician
- Fabrizio Poletti (born 1943), Italian footballer
- Felix Poletti (born 1965), Swiss skeleton racer
- Giuliano Poletti (born 1951), Italian politician
- Ignacio Poletti (1930–2023), Argentine former basketball player
- Kurt Poletti (born 1960), Swiss bobsleigher
- Lee Poletti (born 1948), former Australian lawn bowls international
- Lina Poletti (1885–1971), Italian feminist
- Luigi Poletti (architect) (1792–1869), Italian architect
- Luigi Poletti (mathematician) (1864–1967), Italian poet and mathematician
- Roberto Poletti (born 1971), Italian journalist and politician
- Syria Poletti (1917–1991), Italo-Argentine writer
- Ugo Poletti (1914–1997), Italian cardinal
- Pamela Healy, nee Poletti (born 1963), Bronze medalist in sailing, 1992 Barcelona Olympics
