= Risi =

Risi may refer to:

== Folklore ==
- Jötunn, a being in Germanic folklore

== People ==
- Risi Pouri-Lane (born 200), New Zealand rugby union and sevens player
- Bruno Risi (b. 1968), Swiss professional racing cyclist
- Dino Risi (1916–2008), Italian film director
- Giuliano De Risi (b. 1945), Italian journalist
- Lucio de Risi (b. 1953), Italian electrical engineer
- Nelo Risi (1920–2015), Italian poet and film director
- Peter Risi (1950–2010), Swiss footballer
- Umberto Risi (b. 1940), Italian steeplechase runner
- Vittoria Risi (b. 1978), Italian pornographic actress

== Places ==
- Risi, Iran, a village in Razavi Khorasan Province, Iran

== Other uses ==
- Risi Competizione, American auto racing team formed by Giuseppe Risi
- Risi, in Old Norse, means "giant" and usually refers to a race of legendary beings called the Jötnar.
- RISI, Repository of Industrial Security Incidents
- RISI, Russian Institute for Strategic Research or Russian Institute for Strategic Studies
