= Goria =

Goria may refer to:

- Goria (surname), list of people with the surname
- Goriya, ethnic group of India
- Goria, Bhopal, village in India
- Goria festival of Tripura, India
- Goria dance of Tripura, India
- Lac de Goria, lake in Corsica, France
