= Bartalini =

Bartalini is an Italian surname. Notable people with the surname include:

- Biagio Bartalini (1750–1822), Italian physician and botanist
- Ezio Bartalini (1884–1962), Italian politician
- Marcello Bartalini (born 1962), Italian cyclist

== See also ==
- Bartolini
