= Cuffaro =

Origin
- Language: Italian
- Region of origin: Southern Italy

Cuffaro is a surname native to Southern Italy. Notable people with the surname include:

- Antonino Cuffaro (1932–2019), Italian politician, President of the Party of Italian Communists, former senator of the Italian Republic
- Chris Cuffaro (born 1960), American photographer
- Cristian Cuffaro Russo (born 1988), Argentine footballer
- Maria Cuffaro (born 1964), Italian journalist
- Salvatore Cuffaro (born 1958), Italian ex-politician and criminal
