= Goria (surname) =

Goria is a surname. Notable people with the surname include:

- Alexandre Goria (1823–1860), French composer
- Gianfranco Goria (born 1954), Italian cartoonist and journalist
- Giovanni Goria (1943–1994), Italian politician

== See also ==
- Goria (disambiguation)
