= Carlo Grande =

Carlo Grande may refer to:

- Carlo Grande (rower)
- Carlo Grande (writer)
