= MEGA International =

MEGA International can refer to:

- Mega International Commercial Bank, Chinese bank
- MEGA International S.A., French software company
