= Botteri =

Botteri is a surname. Notable people with the surname include:

- Giovanna Botteri (born 1957), Italian journalist
- Matteo Botteri (1808–1877), ornithologist and collector
- Stéphane Botteri (born 1962), French ice hockey player
