= Romersa =

Romersa is a surname. It may refer to:

- Joe Romersa (born 1956), American songwriter, drummer, multi-instrumentalist, producer, sound engineer and vocalist
- Jos Romersa (1915–2016), Luxembourgian gymnast and Olympian
- Luigi Romersa (1917-2007), Italian journalist, writer and war correspondent
