= Cerreti =

Cerreti is an Italian surname. Notable people with the surname include:

- Alberto Cerreti (1939–2019), Italian politician
- Giulio Cerreti (1903–1985), Italian politician
