= Mimmo Candito =

Italian war correspondent

Mimmo Candito (1941 – 3 March 2018) was an Italian war correspondent.

== Biography ==
Mimmo Candito was born in 1941 in Reggio Calabria. He moved to Genoa in the 1960s and graduated in law there. He was hired at the municipality of the Ligurian capital and began working with Il Lavoro writing articles on cinema and culture. In 1970 he moved to the Turin newspaper La Stampa, for which he became a special correspondent and commentator on international politics.

A war correspondent from the main theaters of conflict in the Middle East, Asia, Africa and South America, he covered, among others, the Soviet and American invasions of Afghanistan, the three Gulf Wars and the Falklands War.

He has been the Italian president of Reporters Without Borders since 1999 and director of the cultural magazine L'Indice dei libri del mese since 2001. He also collaborated with Rai, hosting "Prima Pagina" on Rai Radio 3.

Until his death, he was a lecturer in journalistic language at the University of Turin, in the Master of Communication and Media Cultures; he had previously taught theory and techniques of interviewing and reporting at the University of Genoa.

He was married to the journalist Marinella Venegoni.

During the Book Fair of May 2019, the creation of a prize "Mimmo Càndito - Journalism with a Head High" was announced.

In June of the same year, the newly appointed mayor of the town of Crescentino, his wife's hometown, announced that the civic theater inside the town hall would be named after Mimmo Càndito.

During the meeting of the City Council on July 16, 2019, the motion to name the Civic Theater after Mimmo Càndito was unanimously approved.

== Awards ==
He won a number of journalistic awards, including the Max David and the Luigi Barzini as best Italian correspondent and Golden Doves for Peace.

== Publications ==
- M. Càndito, L'apocalisse Saddam. La vera storia della guerra di Bush, Milano, Baldini Castoldi Dalai, 2002
- A. Papuzzi, Professione giornalista, Roma, Donzelli, 2003
- C. Sorrentino, Il giornalismo in Italia. Aspetti, processi produttivi, tendenze, Roma, Carocci, 2003
- La guerra in televisione. I conflitti moderni tra cronaca e storia, a cura di L. Cigognetti, L. Servetti, P. Sorlin, Venezia, Marsilio, 2003
- Informazione di guerra, informazione in guerra, a cura di N. Labanca, Siena, Protagon, 2004
- G. Farinelli, Storia del giornalismo italiano, Torino, UTET, 2004
- Il braccio legato dietro la schiena. Storie dei giornalisti in guerra, a cura di M. Càndito, Milano, Baldini Castoldi Dalai, 2004
- F. Contorbia, Giornalismo italiano, vol. 2, Milano, Mondadori, 2007
- M. Càndito, Introduzione a Dispacci dal fronte, a cura di Reporters sans frontières, Torino, EGA, 2007
- M. Càndito, I reporter di guerra. Storia di un giornalismo pericoloso da Hemingway a Internet, Milano, Baldini Castoldi Dalai, 2009
- M. Càndito, Postfazione a J. Pulitzer,Sul giornalismo, Torino, Bollati Boringhieri, 2009
- M. Càndito, 55 vasche. Le guerre, il cancro e quella forza dentro, Milano, Rizzoli 2016
- M. Càndito, C'erano i reporter di guerra. Storie di un giornalismo in crisi da Hemingway ai social network, Milano, Baldini Castoldi Dalai, 2016

== Bibliography ==
- Vittorio Sabadin (3 March 2018). "Addio a Mimmo Càndito, storico reporter di guerra per La Stampa". lastampa.it. La Stampa.
- Antonio Ferrari (3 March 2018). "È morto Mimmo Candito, grande inviato di guerra, il giornalista che non conosceva l'invidia". corriere.it. RCS MediaGroup.
- Domenico Affinito (3 March 2018). "Addio a Mimmo Càndito. Da oggi siamo tutti più poveri…". articolo21.org. Elzevira.
- Cesare Martinetti (4 March 2018). "Mimmo Cándito, un inviato davvero speciale". lastampa.it/cultura. La Stampa.
