= Carlo Laurenzi (writer) =

Italian writer and journalist (1920–2003)

- Born: 19 May 1920; Livorno, Kingdom of Italy
- Died: 21 August 2003 (aged 83); Rome, Italy
- Occupations: Writer, journalist

Carlo Laurenzi (19 May 1920 – 21 August 2003) was an Italian writer and journalist. He worked as a journalist for several major Italian newspapers, including La Stampa, Corriere della Sera and Il Giornale, and served as director of La Fiera Letteraria. He published essays, travel writings and novels, including Quell'antico amore (1972), which was a finalist for the Campiello Prize.

== Works ==
- Due anni a Roma (1957)
- Toscana delusa (1961)
- La carovana di mare (1968)
- Quell'antico amore (1972)
