= Alberto Cavallari =

Italian journalist and writer

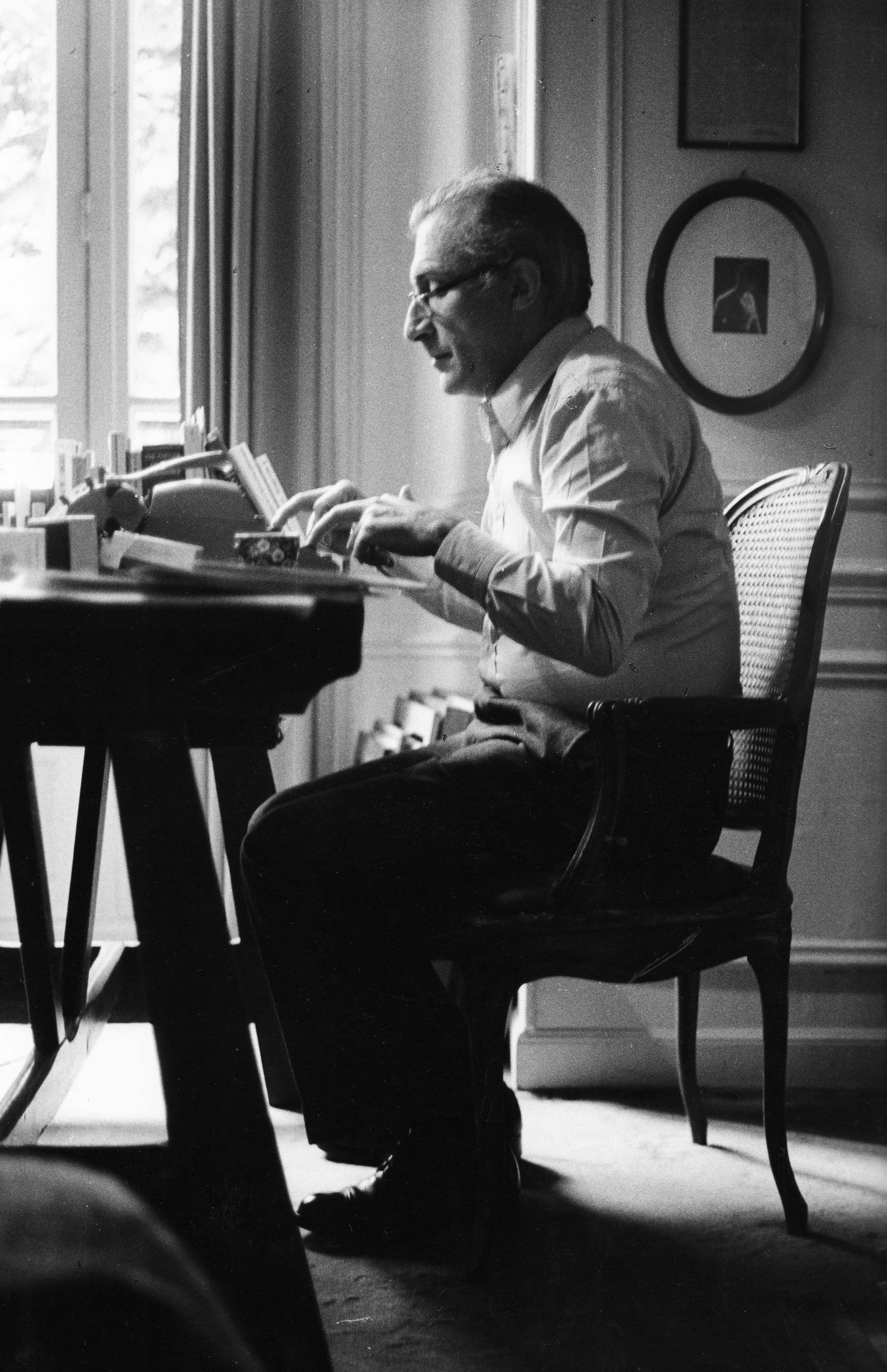
- Cavallari at home: Paris, 24 Avenue Charles Floquet
- Born: 1 September 1927; Piacenza, Kingdom of Italy
- Died: 20 July 1998 (aged 70); Levanto, Liguria, Italy
- Resting place: Bettola (Piacenza), Italy
- Education: High school
- Occupations: Writer; journalist; political commentator
- Years active: 1950s–1990s
- Known for: Editor, Corriere della Sera, 1981–1984
- Spouse: Marisa Astorri
- Children: Paolo and Andrea
- Parent(s): Enrico and Dirce Bongiorni

Alberto Cavallari (1 September 1927 – 20 July 1998) was an Italian journalist and writer.

== Biography ==
The son of storekeeper Enrico (Piacenza, 1894–1972) and housewife Dirce Bongiorni (Casa Celli di S. Lazzaro, 1900 – Piacenza, 1969), he had an elder brother, Oreste. In 1954, he married Maria Teresa Astorri, with whom he had two sons: Paolo and Andrea.

He began his career founding the magazine Numero, (1945–1946), on which artists Ennio Morlotti, Emilio Vedova and others published the Manifesto del Realismo (also known as Oltre Guernica), and collaborating with Italia Libera (1945), official newspaper of Partito d'Azione, Corriere Lombardo (1947) and Libertà, a newspaper of Piacenza.
Later, he worked for the magazine Epoca (as a copy editor, 1950–1953), for the newspapers Corriere della Sera (as a reporter, 1954–1969) and Il Gazzettino, Venice (as editor in chief, 1969–1970). In 1971, Cavallari was a political commentator for TG2 (television news) (1971). After being head of the Rome office of Europeo (1972–1973), he became correspondent from Paris for La Stampa (1973–1975) and Corriere della Sera (1977–1981). He was the editor in chief of Corriere della Sera in the period 1981–1984, when the newspaper was involved in the investigations on the P2 Masonic lodge; and political commentator for La Repubblica from 1984 until his death in 1998.

Cavallari taught journalism at the Paris-Panthéon-Assas University (1978–1989) and held numerous seminars at the University of Pavia. In 1984, he became a member of the European Institute for the Media, first at the University of Manchester, and then at the University of Düsseldorf.

In 1965, Cavallari published, in Corriere della Sera, an inquiry about the Vatican Council II, which culminated, on 3 October, with an interview with Paul VI, the first ever issued by a Pope.

He covered his own life in an autobiography published in the Autodictionary of the Italian writers.

== Books ==
- it L'Europa intelligente, Rizzoli, Milano 1963; survey on science and politics.
- it L'Europa su misura, Vallecchi, Firenze 1963; essay on economic planning in Western Europe.
- it La Russia contro Kruscev, Vallecchi, Firenze 1964; travel diary in Russia in the aftermath of Khrushchev's fall; translated into Spanish, Edtores Plaza and Janes, Barcelona 1965.
- it (With I.Montanelli, P. Ottone, G. Piazzesi and G. Russo) Italia sotto inchiesta, Corriere della Sera, 1963–1965, Sansoni, Firenze 1965.
- Il Vaticano che cambia, Arnoldo Mondadori Editore, Milano 1966; an overview of the Vatican structure including the first interview in history to a Pope; translated into English, Faber & Faber, London 1966; American, Doubleday & Co, New York 1967; Portuguese, Livraria Morais, Lisbon 1967; Spanish, Plaza and Janes, Barcelona 1967; Dutch, Ultgeverij Lannoo, The Hague 1967; Spanish, Ediciones GP, Barcelona 1971.
- it M.A. Asturias e S. Pautasso) Incontro con Miguel Angel Asturias, IILA, Roma 1973.
- it Il potere in Italia, Arnoldo Mondadori Editore, Milano 1967; the Italian political life portrayed through interviews to Italian political figures.
- it Una lettera da Pechino, Garzanti, Milano 1974 e 1976, ISBN 978-88-11-73908-1; diary of a trip through China in 1973.
- it La Cina dell'ultimo Mao, Garzanti, Milano 1975 e 1976, ISBN 978-88-11-73917-3; a revealing journey through the third China following the cultural revolution and the new constitution of 1975.
- it La Francia a sinistra, Garzanti, Milano 1977, ISBN 978-88-11-73934-0; chronicle of political changes and social and cultural life in France in the 1970s.
- it Vicino & lontano, Garzanti, Milano 1981, ISBN 978-88-11-73956-2; an anthology of chronicles on social, economic and political facts having occurred during the years 79–81.
- (With EG Wedell and Luyken GM) Media Competition: The future of print and electronic media in 22 Countries, European Institute for the Media, Manchester and InterMedia Centrum, Hamburg, 1986, ISBN 3-926074-00-0.
- it La fuga di Tolstoj, Giulio Einaudi Editore, Torino 1986, ISBN 978-88-06-59385-8, Garzanti, Milano 1994, ISBN 978-88-11-66653-0 and Skira, Milano 2010, ISBN 978-88-572-0686-8:complete reconstruction of the flight of the Russian writer in the days just preceding his death. Translated into French, Christian Bourgois, Parigi 1989, 2010, ISBN 978-2-267-02069-4; Editions 10/18, Paris 1996, ISBN 2-264-02067-9, Spanish and Catalan, Ediciones de la Magrana, Barcelona 1989 • ISBN 84-7410-451-3; Ediciones Peninsular, Barcelona 1997, ISBN 84-8307-035-9. After this text was adapted, the play "The Kreutzer Sonata", written and staged in 2009, Spain by Quim Lecina.
- it La fabbrica del presente, Feltrinelli, Milano 1990, ISBN 978-88-07-08092-0; lectures on "Public Information" held at the University of Paris 2 and at the University of Pavia in the 1980s.
- it L'atlante del disordine, Garzanti, Milano 1994, ISBN 978-88-11-73836-7, the geopolitical crisis of the century, translated into Norwegian Hegland Trykkeri AS, Oslo 1994, ISBN 978 -82-91165-04-2.
- it La Forza di Sisifo, a cura di Marzio Breda, Aragno Editore, Torino 2011, ISBN 978-88-8419-541-8; collection of chronicles, reports, surveys, interviews and commentaries.

Translations, guardianship and other texts:

- it Dalla pittura ai fumetti, by L. Hogben, Arnoldo Mondadori Editore, Milano 1952.
- Since 1980 has worked for "Affari Esteri" magazine sponsored by the Ministry of Foreign Affairs and by 'Italian Association for the Study of Foreign Policy.
- it Sabbioneta: una stella e una pianura, con P. Carpeggiani, R. Tardito, S. Mazzoni, O. Guaita, L. Sarzi Amade, Cassa di Risparmio delle Provincie Lombarde, Milano 1985.
- Preface of the book Cartoline lametta by Giuseppe Novello, Rosellina Archinto Editore, Milano 1987, ISBN 978-88-7768-037-2.
- it Autodizionario degli scrittori italiani, edited by F. Piemontese, Leonardo Editore, Milano 1990, pp. 98–99. ISBN 88-355-0077-X.
- it Robinson Crusoe, by D. Defoe, Casa Editrice Feltrinelli, Milano 1993, ISBN 978-88-07-82059-5; with an introductory text entitled The Island of modernity, pp. 7–29.

== Prizes ==
- Premio Saint-Vincent di giornalimo (1960)
- Premio Marzotto per il giornalismo (1963)
- Premio Palazzi (1963)
- Premio Estense (1965)
- Lions d'Oro – Lions Club Piacenza (1966)
- Premio giornalistico "Alfio Russo" – Giara d'argento (1979)
- Premio Internazionale "La Madonnina" (1984)
- Premio Acqui Storia – Testimone del Tempo (1988)
- Colomba d'oro per la Pace – Archivio per il Disarmo (1989)
- Premio giornalistico Federico Motta Editore (1996)
- Premio "Angil dal Dom" – Fondazione di Piacenza e Vigevano (1996)

== See also ==
- List of Italian journalists
- List of Italian writers
- List of Milanese people
