= Rosanna Marani =

Italian journalist (born 1946)

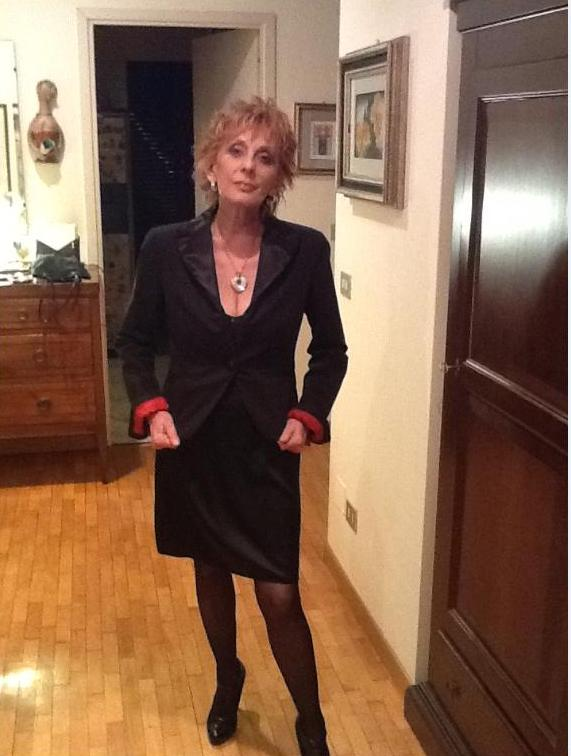
- Born: Rosanna Marani; 12 October 1946 (age 79); Imola, Italy
- Occupations: Journalist, television host
- Years active: 1973–present
- Spouses: Perluigi Aprà (m. 1966; died 1981); Vincenzo Celentano (m. 1981)

Rosanna Marani (born 12 October 1946) is an Italian journalist and television host.

== Biography ==
She started out in journalism at La Gazzetta dello Sport on 18 November 1973 with an exclusive interview with Gianni Rivera silent print from 6 months. She has collaborated with Il Giornale d'Italia and Il Resto del Carlino under the guidance of Gualtiero Vecchietti and Italo Cucci. It was the first woman to become a sports journalist in 1976 and was also the first Journalist to conduct a sports on TV: a Telenorditalia, issuer Lombard, in fact, led Sports Bar, a talk show dedicated to football, sports and protagonists of the '70s.

She followed her career developed entirely on television. For Telemilano, the first television network Fininvest, was sent to the news of Buongiorno Italia, Wiva le donne, Record, Superflash e de Gli speciali. For RAI worked in: Giorni d'Europa, 7 Giorni al Parlamento (with Gianluca Di Schiena), È quasi goal, Il Processo del Lunedì, Tv7, TG3 Telesogni (with Claudio Ferretti). Among the interviews, broadcast by Tg1 of 1 PM to Rosa Bossi, Silvio Berlusconi's mother. l'unica esistente e di cui la signora Marani possiede i diritti d'autore in esclusiva During a brief period in Telemontecarlo was posted on Sport Show, the Tg and Mondocalcio.

In 1990s, Roberto Tumbarello calls for Odeon TV for the heading "Cavoli a merenda" into the transmission Forza Italia, led by a young Fabio Fazio. A Telelombardia, in the 1990s, Rosanna Marani participates Novantesimo donna, led by Eliana Jotta, with a regular column in which votes awards of merit and demerit to the players, bacchettando behaviors less sporty. Works in Telenova Fax 13, and Antenna 3: Marinasumagol, Non solo bici, Antenna tredici, Visti a San Siro, Speciali cronaca e politica, in which he interviews political supporters.

She was married twice: with Pierluigi Aprà, actor of la Cina è vicina to Marco Bellocchio, who died prematurely at 37, and Vincenzo Celentano. He has three children: Gabriele, director, Andrea and Giulia. Now retired, is engaged in volunteer work, after having fought since 2006 to eradicate a malignant tumor. Along with Corinna Andreatta, is among the founders of Chiliamacisegua, partnership non-profit for the protection of animals.

=== Orders ===
- 5th Class / Knight: Cavaliere Ordine al Merito della Repubblica Italiana: 2 June 1983

== Bibliography ==
- Una donna in Campo edizioni Sansoni-Agielle,1975
- La testa nel pallone edizioni Mursia,1978
- L’anima del Palio edizioni NCS, 1993
- Tesi di laurea di Ilaria Macchi, Silvia Dalla Costa, Fanny Xhajanka, Giada Masieri, Chiara Colnaghi
- Atleta al femminile di Gian Maria Madella (Edizioni EditNova)
- Maledetti giornalisti di Gianni de Felice (Conti Editore)
- Voglio entrare negli spogliatoi di Francesca Devincenzi (Sassoscritto Editore)
