= Guido Ceronetti =

Italian poet & philosopher (1927–2018)

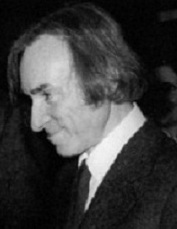
Ceronetti in 1982

Guido Ceronetti (24 August 1927, in Turin – 13 September 2018, in Cetona) was an Italian poet, philosopher, novelist, translator, journalist and playwright.

In 1970, he founded the Theater of the Sensitive. His works are archived at the Cantonal Library of Lugano. He wrote columns for La Repubblica, La Stampa and Radio Radicale.

Emil Cioran dedicated to his book Il silenzio del corpo ("The Silence of the Body") a chapter of the essay Exercices d'admiration (1986).

Ceronetti died in Cetona, Italy, on 13 September 2018 from bronchopneumonia at the age of 91.

== Works (in Italian) ==
=== Essaying, non-fiction and narrative ===
- Difesa della luna e altri argomenti di miseria terrestre, Rusconi, Milano, 1971.
- Aquilegia, illustrazioni di Erica Tedeschi, Rusconi, Milano, 1973; con il titolo Aquilegia. Favola sommersa, Einaudi, Torino, 1988.
- La carta è stanca, Adelphi, Milano, 1976; II ed., Adelphi, 2000.
- La musa ulcerosa: scritti vari e inediti, Rusconi, Milano, 1978.
- Il silenzio del corpo. Materiali per studio di medicina, Adelphi, Milano, 1979.
- La vita apparente, Adelphi, Milano, 1982.
- Un viaggio in Italia, 1981–1983, Einaudi, Torino, 1983; nuova ed. con supplementi, Einaudi, 2004; con appendice di testi inediti e una nuova Prefazione dell'Autore, Einaudi, 2014.
- Albergo Italia, Einaudi, Torino, 1985.
- Briciole di colonna. 1975–1987, La Stampa, Torino, 1987.
- Pensieri del tè, Adelphi, Milano, 1987.
- L'occhiale malinconico, Adelphi, Milano, 1988.
- La pazienza dell'arrostito. Giornali e ricordi 1983–1987, Adelphi, Milano, 1990.
- D.D. Deliri Disarmati, Einaudi, Torino, 1993.
- Tra pensieri, Adelphi, Milano, 1994.
- Cara incertezza, Adelphi, Milano, 1997.
- Lo scrittore inesistente, La Stampa, Torino, 1999.
- Briciole di colonna. Inutilità di scrivere, La Stampa, Torino, 1999.
- La fragilità del pensare. Antologia filosofica personale a cura di Emanuela Muratori, BUR, Milano, 2000.
- La vera storia di Rosa Vercesi e della sua amica Vittoria, Einaudi, Torino, 2000.
- N.U.E.D.D. Nuovi Ultimi Esasperati Deliri Disarmati, Einaudi, Torino, 2001.
- Piccolo inferno torinese, Einaudi, Torino, 2003.
- Oltre Chiasso. Collaborazioni ai giornali della Svizzera italiana 1988–2001, Libreria dell'Orso, Pistoia, 2004.
- La lanterna del filosofo, Adelphi, Milano, 2005.
- Centoventuno pensieri del Filosofo Ignoto, La Finestra editrice, Lavis, 2006.
- Insetti senza frontiere, Adelphi, Milano, 2009.
- In un amore felice. Romanzo in lingua italiana, Adelphi, Milano, 2011.
- Ti saluto mio secolo crudele. Mistero e sopravvivenza del XX secolo, illustrazioni a cura di Guido Ceronetti e Laura Fatini, Einaudi, Torino, 2011.
- L'occhio del barbagianni, Adelphi, Milano, 2014.
- Tragico tascabile, Adelphi, Milano, 2015.
- Per le strade della Vergine, Adelphi, Milano, 2016.
- Per non dimenticare la memoria, Adelphi, Milano, 2016.
- Regie immaginarie, Einaudi, Torino, 2018.

=== Poetry ===
- Nuovi salmi. Psalterium primum, Pacini Mariotti, Pisa, 1955, 1957.
- La ballata dell'infermiere, Tallone, Alpignano, 1965.
- Poesie, frammenti, poesie separate, Einaudi, Torino, 1968.
- Poesie: 1968–1977, Corbo e Fiore, Venezia, 1978.
- Poesie per vivere e per non vivere, Einaudi, Torino, 1979.
- Storia d'amore del 1812 ritrovata nella memoria e altri versi, illustrazioni di Mimmo Paladino, Castiglioni & Corubolo, Verona, 1987.
- Compassioni e disperazioni. Tutte le poesie 1946–1986, Einaudi, Torino, 1987.
- Disegnare poesia (con Carlo Cattaneo), San Marco dei Giustiniani, Genova, 1991.
- Scavi e segnali. Poesie inedite 1986–1992, Tallone, Alpignano, 1992.
- La distanza. Poesie 1946–1996, Edizione riveduta e aggiornata dall'Autore, BUR, Milano, 1996.
- (sotto lo pseudonimo Mehmet Gayuk), Il gineceo, Tallone, Alpignano, 1998; Adelphi, Milano, 1998.
- Messia, Tallone, Alpignano, 2002; Adelphi, Milano, 2017 [nella prima parte del libro].
- Tre ballate recuperate dalle carte di Lugano: 1965, Tallone, Alpignano, 2003.
- Le ballate dell'angelo ferito, Il Notes magico, Padova, 2009.
- Poemi del Gineceo, Adelphi, Milano, 2012 [riedizione de Il gineceo del 1998 con inediti e nuova prefazione].
- Sono fragile sparo poesia, Einaudi, Torino, 2012.

=== Theatre ===
- Furori e poesia della Rivoluzione francese. 8–18 giugno 1989, Carte Segrete, Roma, 1984.
- Mystic Luna Park. Spettacolo per marionette ideofore, ricordi figurativi di Giosetta Fioroni, Becco Giallo, Oderzo, 1988.
- Teatro dei sensibili, La rivoluzione sconosciuta. Pensieri in libertà per ricordare 1789. Una scelta di testi a cura di Guido Ceronetti, Tallone, Alpignano, 1989 [raccolta di 44 locandine teatrali a fogli sciolti dalla mostra-spettacolo di Dogliani].
- Viaggia viaggia, Rimbaud!, Il melangolo, Genova, 1992.
- La iena di San Giorgio. Tragedia per marionette, Einaudi, Torino, 1994.
- Deliri disarmati. Nella messa in scena di Lorenzo Serveti per l'Associazione nazionale L'Albero, a cura di L. M. Musati e M. Lucidi, Grin, 1996.
- Le marionette del Teatro dei Sensibili, Aragno, Torino, 2004 [contiene: I Misteri di Londra e Mystic Luna Park].
- Rosa Vercesi, illustrazioni di Federico Maggioni, Edizioni Corraini, Mantova, 2005.

=== Translation to italian ===
- Martial, Epigrammi, Collana I Millenni, Einaudi, Torino, 1964; Nuova edizione con un saggio di G. Ceronetti, Collana Gli struzzi n. 187, Einaudi, 1979; La Finestra Editrice, Lavis, 2007.
- I Salmi, Collana I Millenni, Einaudi, Torino, 1967; nuova ed. riveduta, Einaudi, Torino, 1994; col titolo Il Libro dei Salmi, Adelphi, Milano, 1985, 2006.
- Catullus, Le poesie, Collana I Millenni, Torino, Einaudi, 1969.
- Qohelet o l'Ecclesiaste, Einaudi, 1970, 1988, 1997, 2008; Qohelet. Colui che prende la parola, Milano, Adelphi, 2002.
- Decimus Iunius Iuvenalis, Le Satire, Collana I Millenni, Torino, Einaudi, 1971; La Finestra Editrice, Trento, 2008.
- Il Libro di Giobbe, Adelphi, Milano, 1972; nuova ed. riveduta, Adelphi, Milano, 1997.
- Cantico dei cantici, Adelphi, Milano, 1975; Alberto Tallone Editore, Alpignano, 2011.
- Il Libro del Profeta Isaia, Adelphi, Milano, 1981; nuova ed. riveduta e ampliata, Adelphi, Milano, 1992.
- Come un talismano. Libro di traduzioni, Adelphi, Milano, 1986. ISBN 978-88-459-0637-4.
- Costantino Kavafis, Tombe, Edizioni dell'Elefante, Roma, 1986.
- Iuvenalis, Le donne. Satira sesta, Alberto Tallone Editore, Alpignano, 1987.
- Nostradamus: annunciatore nel secolo 16. della Rivoluzione che durerà dal 1789 al 1999 / profezie estratte dalle Centurie di Michel de Nostredame, Alpignano, Alberto Tallone Editore, 1989.
- Tango delle capinere, Verona, Castiglioni & Corubolo, 1989.
- Due versioni inedite da Shakespeare e da Céline, Pisa, Cursi, 1989.
- Sofocles, Edipo Tyrannos. Coro 1186–1222, Roma, Edizioni dell'Elefante, 1990.
- (con Cristina Chaumont) Sura 99. Al Zalzala (Il tremito della terra) dal Corano, calligrafia di Mauro Zennaro, Roma, Edizioni dell'Elefante, 1990.
- Il Pater noster. Matteo 6, 9–13, calligrafia di Mauro Zennaro, Roma, Edizioni dell'Elefante, 1990.
- Giorni di Kavafis. 1899–1928. Poesie di Constantinos Kavafis, Verona, Officina Chimerea, 1995.
- Messia, Alpignano, Tallone, 2002; Milano, Adelphi, 2017 [nella seconda parte del libro].
- Siamo fragili, Spariamo poesia. i poeti delle letture pubbliche del Teatro dei Sensibili , Magnano, Qiqajon, 2003.
- Constantinos Kavafis, Un'ombra fuggitiva di piacere, Milano, Adelphi, 2004.
- Trafitture di tenerezza. Poesia tradotta 1963–2008, Torino, Einaudi, 2008.
- Horatius, Odi. Scelte e tradotte da Guido Ceronetti, Milano, Adelphi, 2018.
