= Lorenzo Soria =

Argentinian-Italian journalist and executive (1951–2020)

- Born: 27 November 1951; Buenos Aires, Argentina
- Died: 7 August 2020 (aged 68); Los Angeles, California, U.S.
- Occupation: Journalist
- Years active: 1982–2020

Lorenzo Soria (27 November 1951 – 7 August 2020) was an Argentine-Italian journalist and executive who served as the president of the Hollywood Foreign Press Association for three terms.

== Biography ==
Soria was born in Argentina to Italian parents who left the country during World War II. He lived in Buenos Aires until the age of 11, when his father died and his family moved back to Milan.

=== Journalistic experiences ===
Soria devoted his life to journalism: in the early years he dealt with economics, technology and politics and cinema, interviewing many Hollywood celebrities and writing about movies and changes in the film and television industry. In 1982, Soria moved from Milan to Los Angeles, where he became a local reporter for the weekly magazine L'Espresso and, beginning in 1988, for the newspaper La Stampa. In 1989, Soria joined the Hollywood Foreign Press Association.

=== President of the HFPA ===
Soria was president of the Hollywood Foreign Press Association three times: from 2003 to 2005, from 2015 to 2017 and finally from 2019 until his death in 2020. Under his presidency, agreements were made with internationally important film events, such as the Toronto International Film Festival and the Venice Film Festival, also to support international young directors studying in Los Angeles. Soria became the face of the HFPA, introducing the Golden Globes nomination announcements and solidifying the Association's role in the world of charity.

=== Death ===
Soria died in his home in Los Angeles on 7 August 2020, at the age of 68, following a long struggle with lung cancer.
