= Clara Petacci =

Mistress of Benito Mussolini (1912–1945)

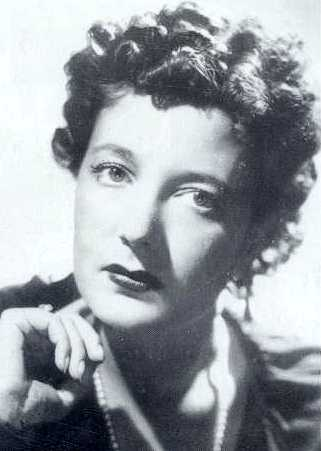
- Petacci in the 1930s
- Born: 28 February 1912; Rome, Kingdom of Italy
- Died: 28 April 1945 (aged 33); Giulino di Mezzegra, Italian Social Republic
- Cause of death: Execution by firing squad
- Known for: Mistress of Benito Mussolini
- Spouse: Riccardo Federici (m. 1934; div. 1936)
- Partner: Benito Mussolini (1933–1945)
- Relatives: Miriam di San Servolo (sister); Marcello Petacci (brother)

Clara "Claretta" Petacci (Italian: [klaˈretta peˈtattʃi]; 28 February 1912 – 28 April 1945) was a mistress of the Italian dictator Benito Mussolini. She was killed by Italian partisans during Mussolini's summary execution.

== Early life ==
Daughter of Persichetti (1888–1962) and the physician Francesco Saverio Petacci (1883–1970), Clara Petacci was born into a privileged and religious family in Rome in 1912. Her father (a physician of the Holy Apostolic Palaces who for several years also had his own private clinic, "La Clinica del Sole") became a supporter of fascism. A child when Mussolini rose to power in the 1920s, Clara Petacci idolised him from an early age. After Violet Gibson attempted to assassinate the dictator in April 1926, the 14-year-old Petacci wrote to him commenting "O, Duce, why was I not with you? ... Could I not have strangled that murderous woman?" Clara studied music with mixed results and was a pupil of the violinist Corrado Archibugi, a friend of her parents.

== Relationship with Mussolini ==
Petacci had a long-standing relationship with Mussolini while he was married to Rachele Mussolini. Petacci was 28 years younger than Mussolini. They met for the first time in April 1932 when Mussolini, driving with an aide to Ostia, overtook a car occupied by the twenty-year-old Petacci and family members. She called out, "Duce! Duce!" and when he stopped, told him that she had been writing to him since her early teens.

In 1934, Petacci married Italian Air Force officer Riccardo Federici, but she parted ways with her husband when he was sent to Tokyo as Air Attaché in 1936. Petacci then became the mistress of the fifty-three-year-old Mussolini, visiting his large headquarters in the Palazzo Venezia, where a private apartment was reserved for her. Her infatuation with Mussolini appears to have been genuine and permanent. The affair became widely known and members of the Petacci family, notably her brother, Marcello, were able to benefit financially and professionally by influence-selling.

Clara was passionate about painting. She took on the role of Mussolini's secret companion, sharing his darkest moments and his final fate, apparently without ever demanding that he leave his wife Rachele for her.

Part of Petacci and Mussolini's correspondence has not been released on the grounds of privacy.

=== Social rise of the Petacci family ===
Toward the end of 1939, the Petacci family moved from their middle-class residence on Via Lazzaro Spallanzani (adjacent to Villa Torlonia) to the splendid "Villa Camilluccia" (located on the slopes of Monte Mario, then on the outskirts of the city), designed by the architects Vincenzo Monaco and Amedeo Luccichenti. It represented an example of Fascist art, defined as Italian Rationalism.

In the right wing of the ground floor (probably for security reasons, due to the necessary proximity to the shelter) was located the alcove of Claretta and Benito. It consisted of a bedroom with walls and ceiling covered in mirrors and furnished with pink furniture, served by a bathroom clad in black marble.

== Death ==
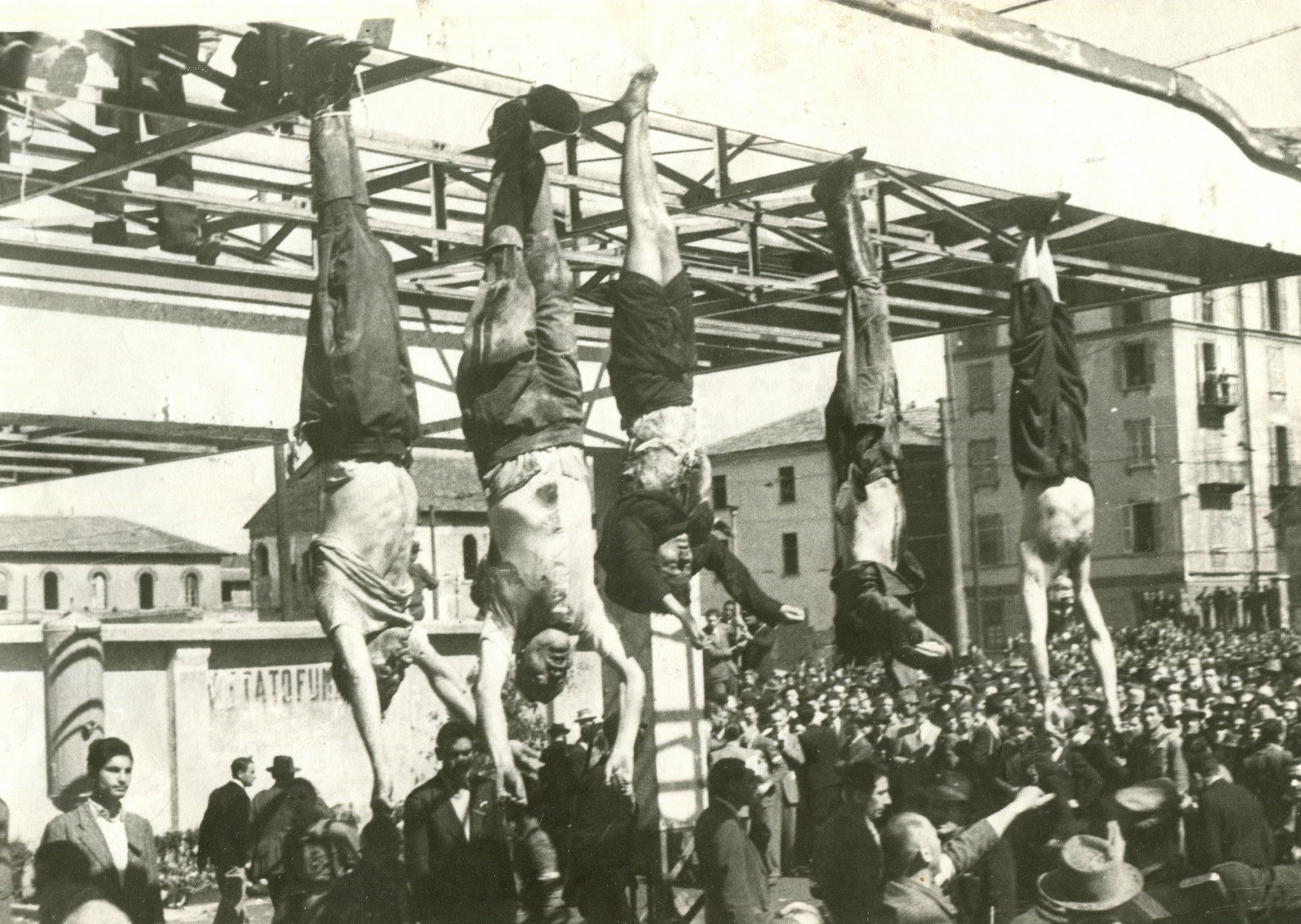
The bodies of Mussolini (second from the left) and Petacci (recognizable by her skirt) displayed at Piazzale Loreto. The first corpse on the left is Nicola Bombacci. The last two on the right are Alessandro Pavolini and Achille Starace.

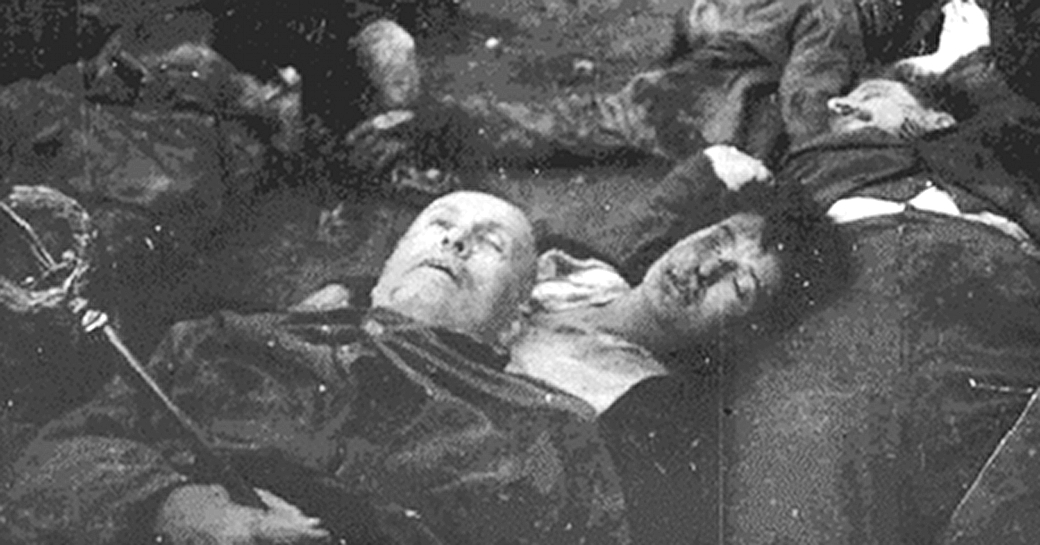
The bodies of Mussolini and Petacci in Piazzale Loreto

Clara Petacci was arrested on 25 July 1943, at the fall of the Fascist regime. During this period, she maintained an intense correspondence with Mussolini and, despite the Duce's contrary opinion, kept all the letters. In one of these she asked that, at the Verona trial, Galeazzo Ciano be sentenced to death as a "traitor, cowardly, filthy, self-interested and false", thus expressing an extremely harsh position (also applicable to Edda Mussolini, "his worthy accomplice"), which was defined by the historian Emilio Gentile as showing "Nazi rigor".

On 27 April 1945, Mussolini and Petacci were captured at Dongo by a unit of the 52nd Garibaldi Brigade of partisans while travelling with a Luftwaffe convoy retreating to Germany. The German column included Italian Social Republic members.

On 28 April, she and Mussolini were taken to Mezzegra and executed. One source alleges Petacci's execution was not planned and that she died by throwing herself on Mussolini in a vain attempt to protect him from the bullets. On the following day, the bodies of Mussolini and Petacci were taken to Piazzale Loreto in Milan and hung upside down by their feet from the canopy of the Esso petrol station in order to protect the bodies from further desecration by the crowd.

The location to which they were taken was chosen as a symbolic act of revenge for the massacre of fifteen partisans and antifascists, executed in reprisal at that same site on 10 August 1944. The bodies were photographed as a crowd vented their rage upon them. On the same day, Clara's brother, Marcello Petacci, was also killed in Dongo by the partisans, along with fifteen other people complicit in Mussolini's escape.

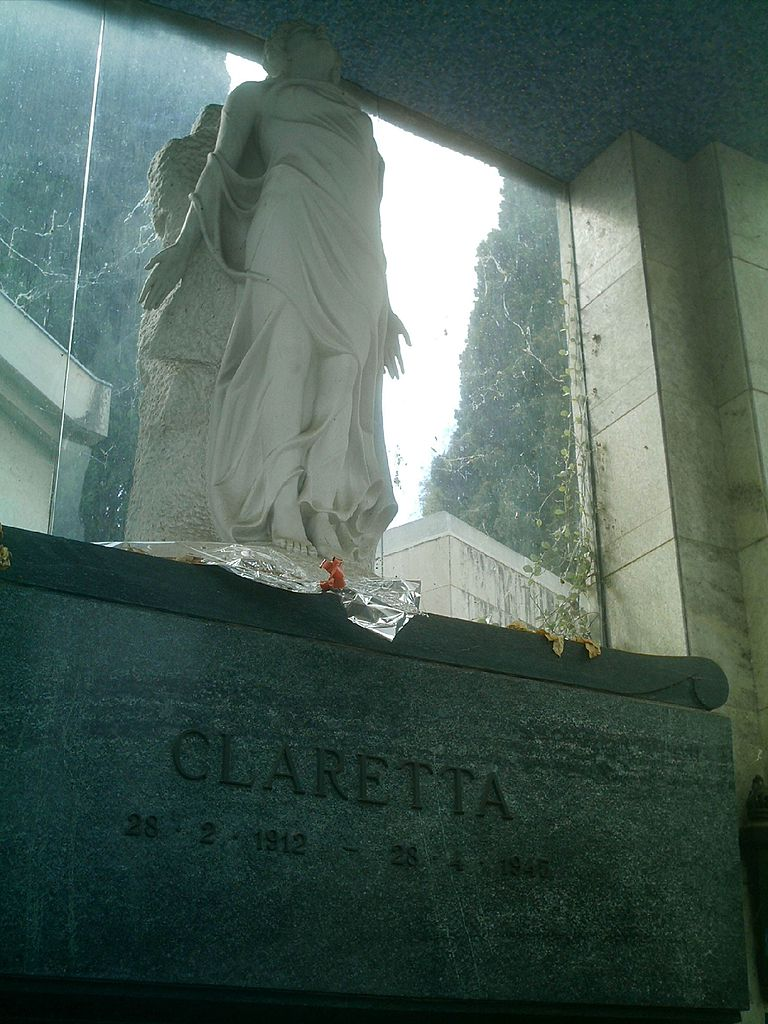
Claretta Petacci's tomb at the Campo Verano cemetery in Rome

At around 3 p.m., the bodies arrived at the Civic Morgue on Via Giuseppe Ponzio.

At nightfall the following day, 30 April, by order of the National Liberation Committee (CLN), Claretta Petacci's body was buried (as were Mussolini and others) in a pit in Field 16 of the Cimitero Maggiore di Milano, left anonymous to avoid further desecration. After two days, at night, to make identification more difficult, again by order of the CLN, the body was exhumed and transferred to a pit in Field 10, the perpetual field intended for the fallen of the RSI, under the fictitious name "Rita Colfosco". It remained there until March 1956, when, with authorization from the Minister of the Interior Fernando Tambroni, Petacci's body was exhumed, transported to Rome, and interred in the family tomb at the Campo Verano cemetery on the 16th.

Following the war, Petacci's family began civil and criminal court cases against Walter Audisio for Petacci's unlawful killing. After a lengthy legal process, an investigating judge eventually closed the case in 1967. Audisio was acquitted of murder and embezzlement on the grounds that the actions complained of occurred as an act of war against the Germans and the fascists during a period of enemy occupation.

Following the deaths of her direct descendants between the 1960s and 1970s and the relocation of the remaining family members to the United States, the tomb was declared a "structure in a state of abandonment" by the cemetery administration in 2015. An association proposed restoring the structure, while former mayor of Sant'Abbondio Alberto Botta proposed transferring the body to Mezzegra, the place of Petacci's death. Subsequently, the tomb was restored in autumn 2017 after a fundraising campaign by the association "Campo della Memoria".

== Epistolary correspondence ==
Only part of the correspondence exchanged over more than fifteen years between Mussolini and Petacci has been published. It is preserved at the State Archives of Rome and has been the subject of a legal dispute.

== Works ==
- Il mio diario, Cernusco sul Naviglio, Editori Associati, 1946.
- Mussolini segreto. Diari 1932-1938, edited by Mauro Suttora, Milan, Rizzoli, 2009, ISBN 978-88-17-03737-2.
- Verso il disastro. Mussolini in guerra. Diari 1939-1940, edited by Mimmo Franzinelli, Milan, Rizzoli, 2011, ISBN 978-88-17-04742-5.

== See also ==
- Eva Braun – Adolf Hitler's mistress
- Margherita Sarfatti – one of Mussolini's earlier mistresses
- Grand Hotel Rimini – Petacci's residence in Rimini during Mussolini's summer holidays in Riccione

== Sources ==
- De Felice, Renzo (1996) [1981]. Mussolini. Il Duce. 2: Lo stato totalitario, 1936–1940 (in Italian) (2 ed.). Torino: Einaudi.

== Bibliography ==
- Franco Bandini, Claretta, Milan, Longanesi, 1969.
- Fabrizio Bernini, Il podestà di Gargnano. Vita sul Garda del capo del fascismo tra Rachele e Claretta, Pavia, Iuculano, 2007. ISBN 978-88-7072-757-9.
- Gustavo Bocchini Padiglione, L'harem del Duce, Milan, Mursia, 2006. ISBN 88-425-3570-2.
- Isabella Brandi Antonini, Claretta Petacci. Una donna innamorata, Rome, Curcio, 2005.
- Pierfranco Bruni, Passione e morte. Claretta e Ben, Cosenza, Pellegrini Editore, 2012. ISBN 978-88-8101-869-7.
- Brutus, L'ultima favorita, Clara Petacci. L'idillio, le ansie, il successo, Rome, Novissima, 1945.
- Pasquale Chessa, Barbara Raggi, L'ultima lettera di Benito. Mussolini e Petacci: amore e politica a Salò 1943-45, Milan, Mondadori, 2010. ISBN 978-88-04-60688-8.
- Angelo Colleoni, Claretta Petacci. Rivelazioni sulla vita, gli amori, la morte, Milan, Lucchi, 1945.
- Richard Collier, Duce! Duce! Ascesa e caduta di Benito Mussolini, Milan, Mursia, 1971.
- Oreste del Buono, Amori neri, Rome, Theoria, 1985.
- Luigi de Vincentis, Io son te, Milan, U.T.A.C, 1947.
- Giorgio Fabre, Mussolini, Claretta e la questione della razza. 1937-38, in Annals of the Ugo La Malfa Foundation, vol. 24, 2009, pp. 347–367.
- Roberto Festorazzi, Claretta Petacci. La donna che morì per amore di Mussolini, Bologna, Minerva, 2012. ISBN 978-88-7381-405-4.
- Luciano Garibaldi, La pista inglese. Chi uccise Mussolini e la Petacci?, Milan, Ares, 2002. ISBN 88-8155-238-8.
- Roberto Gervaso, Claretta, Milan, Rizzoli, 1982.
- Marco Innocenti, Telefoni bianchi amori neri, Milan, Mursia, 1999. ISBN 88-425-2572-3.
- Marco Innocenti, Edda contro Claretta. Una storia di odio e di amore, Milan, Mursia, 2003. ISBN 88-425-3117-0.
- Daniel Jarach, La vita di Claretta Petacci. La donna che seguì Mussolini fino alla morte, Sesto San Giovanni, Peruzzo, 1986.
- Gunther Langes, Auf Wiedersehen Claretta. Il diario dell'uomo che poteva salvare Mussolini e la Petacci, edited by Nico Pirozzi, Villaricca, Edizioni Cento Autori, 2012. ISBN 978-88-97121-37-4.
- Bruno Giovanni Lonati, Quel 28 aprile. Mussolini e Claretta: la verità, Milan, Mursia, 1994. ISBN 88-425-1761-5.
- Benito Mussolini, A Clara. Tutte le lettere a Clara Petacci. 1943-1945, edited by Luisa Montevecchi, Milan, Mondadori, 2011. ISBN 978-88-370-8704-3.
- Alfredo Pace, Benito Mussolini e Claretta Petacci. Chi li ha uccisi, come, dove, quando. Diverse ipotesi, qualche certezza, Milan, Greco&Greco, 2008. ISBN 978-88-7980-448-6.
- Giuseppina Persichetti, La enamorada de Mussolini, Madrid, Ediciones Caballero Audaz, 1947. (in Spanish)
- Anita Pensotti, Almanacco del Novecento, II, Le italiane. Memoriali, conversazioni, documenti per un racconto della vita di Edda Ciano, Toti Dal Monte, Regina Elena, Gina Lollobrigida, Sofia Loren, Anna Magnani, Giulietta Masina, Flora Mastroianni, Rachele Mussolini, Claretta Petacci, Renata Tebaldi, Milan, Simonelli, 1999. ISBN 88-86792-16-6.
- Marcello Petacci, Raccolta di alcuni lavori scientifici, Rome, Italgraf, 1961.
- Myriam Petacci, Chi ama è perduto. Mia sorella Claretta, Gardolo di Trento, Reverdito, 1988. ISBN 88-342-0213-9.
- Francesco Saverio Petacci, La vita e i suoi nemici, Rome, Unione Editoriale d'Italia, 1940.
- Arrigo Petacco, L'archivio segreto di Mussolini, Milan, Mondadori, 1997. ISBN 88-04-42031-6.
- Arrigo Petacco, Eva e Claretta. Le amanti del diavolo, Milan, Mondadori, 2012. ISBN 978-88-04-62246-8.
- Franco Rovere, Vita amorosa di Claretta Petacci, Milan, Lucchi, 1946.
- Franco Servello, Luciano Garibaldi, Perché uccisero Mussolini e Claretta. La verità negli archivi del PCI, Soveria Mannelli, Rubbettino, 2012. ISBN 978-88-498-3100-9.
- Franz Spunda, Clara Petacci. Roman um die geliebte Mussolinis berchtesgaden, Berchtesgaden, Zimmer & Herzog, 1952. (in German)
- Duilio Susmel, Claretta Petacci. Dalla leggenda alla storia! Vita e morte della donna che volle restare con Mussolini sino alla fine, Florence, Editrice Fiume, 1959.
- Vincenzo Talarico, Splendori e miserie delle sorelle Petacci, Naples, Conte, 1944.
- Bruno Vespa, L'amore e il potere. Da Rachele a Veronica, un secolo di storia italiana, Milan, Mondadori, 2007. ISBN 978-88-04-57268-8.
- Armando Volpi, Amore e morte. Corrispondenza tra Mussolini e Claretta, Rome–Milan, Volpi, 1945.
- Antje Windgassen, Im Bund mit der Macht. Die Frauen der Diktatoren, Frankfurt–New York, Campus, 2002. ISBN 3-593-36900-1. (in German)
- Mirella Serri (2021). Claretta l'hitleriana: Storia della donna che non morì per amore di Mussolini [Claretta the Hitlerian: Story of the woman who did not die for love of Mussolini]. Milan: Longanesi.
