= Marcello Petacci =

Brother of Mussolini's lover

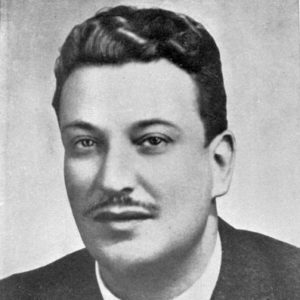
Marcello Petacci

Marcello Cesare Augusto Petacci (Italian pronunciation: [marˈtʃɛllo ˈtʃeːzare auˈɡusto peˈtattʃi]; Rome, 1 May 1910 – Dongo, Lombardy, 28 April 1945) was an Italian surgeon and businessman, the brother of actress Maria Petacci and of dictator Benito Mussolini's lover Clara Petacci.

Accused by many of enriching himself illegally through his closeness to Mussolini, Petacci managed in the last days of the Second World War to escape to Switzerland with his family, but chose to go back to Italy. He was captured and executed a few days later by partisans along Lake Como at the same time as Mussolini and his sister Clara.

== Biography ==
Son of Giuseppina Persichetti (1888–1962) and the physician Francesco Saverio Petacci (1883–1970), Marcello Petacci was a businessman and an officer in the Regia Marina. His father worked as a physician in the Holy Apostolic Palaces. He graduated in medicine at the age of 22 in 1932 and was assistant to the renowned surgeon Mario Donati in Milan. In 1939 he became a lecturer in surgical pathology.

Benito Mussolini's relationship with his sister had begun in 1936, but it was only at the beginning of 1939, when the family had a luxurious villa built on the slopes of Monte Mario in the rationalist style ("La Camilluccia"), that the relationship became public knowledge. From 1940 onwards, a group of intriguers and parasites (nicknamed "Clan Petacci" by the people) had gathered around the Petacci family, led by their mother ("halfway between a boxer and a caryatid") with an iron hand; Marcello, with his economic manoeuvres, was an integral part of it. They sought to exploit the privileged channel with Mussolini for their own interests.

From 1940 Petacci was an opponent of the Chief of Police Carmine Senise and tried to dismiss him. In his autobiography, Senise recounted the episodes that led him to clash with Petacci: the expulsion from Italy of a Romanian "adventurer" with whom the latter was in business; the liberation of an ex-convict, who had promised a bribe of 400,000 Lire to the doctor if the latter "saved" him; the failure to hand over a box full of gold coins smuggled into Spain.

In 1942 Petacci became director of a hospital in Venice and bought a villa in Merano. He was criticised by the Gerarchi for his profiteur-like behaviour: both Galeazzo Ciano and Francesco Maria Barracu sent many confidential letters to Mussolini on the subject. Ciano wrote in his diary on 20 November 1941 that, according to Riccardi, Petacci was a 'swindling businessman'. Moreover, according to the head of the Fascist political police Guido Leto, "Dr. Petacci does more harm to the Duce than fifteen battles lost". His enemies went so far as to compare him to Lorenzino de' Medici, and according to Marshal Emilio De Bono "he should be put up against the wall".

In June 1942 Petacci tried, with the involvement of Guido Buffarini Guidi, to illegally transport 18 kg (40 lb) of gold from Spain by diplomatic courier. Mussolini was very indignant about the matter and ordered Petacci to "refrain from any traffic in the future". Other business deals that Petacci was involved in during the war included the purchase of tin from Portugal and rubber from France, raw materials that Italy was in dire need of at the time. From the fall of the Fascist regime on 25 July to the armistice on 8 September 1943 he was imprisoned for his closeness to Benito Mussolini and freed by the Germans.

=== Escape to Switzerland and return to Italy ===
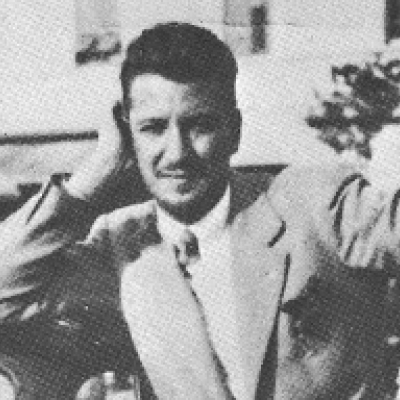
Marcello Petacci in the 1930s.

On the night of 19 April 1945, accompanied by his wife Zita Ritossa and their two children, Petacci paid the sum of one million lire to smugglers (using false passports issued by the Spanish Consulate in Milan in the name of the Molanos) to try to enter Canton Ticino in Switzerland from Agra in the Luino area or from Lanzo d'Intelvi. The group was hosted by the Jewish Rosemberg family, whom he had previously helped to secretly expatriate. However, the four were almost immediately discovered by the Swiss police and interned in a camp in Bellinzona where he could work as a surgeon. Despite the opposition of the police authorities regarding their safety, they let them return to Milan to his sister Clara.

Petacci then returned to Italy with his family on 23 April 1945 via the Palone pedestrian crossing in the municipality of Dumenza near Luino. On 25 April he went to the Spanish consul in Milan, Don Fernando Canthal, to get his permission for an important mission on behalf of Mussolini. The consul accepted and they both went to the Prefecture where Mussolini was. Mussolini entrusted him with a letter for Sir Clifford Norton, British ambassador in Bern: the letter said that the surrender of the Italian Social Republic to the British was offered. In exchange, the British would not have to topple Fascism, but use it as an ally against the Communists.

=== Death ===
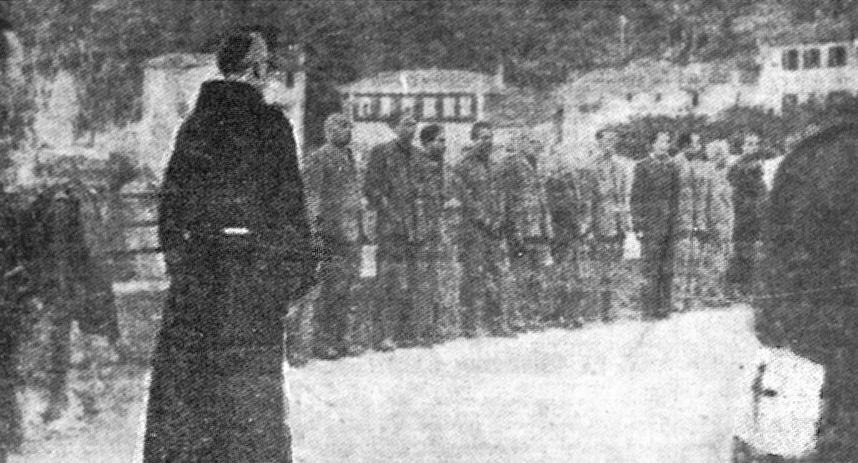
A religious man gives absolution to the fascists in Dongo shortly before their execution. Petacci was shot just after this picture.

On 27 April 1945, following unsuccessful negotiations with Cardinal Ildefonso Schuster and members of the CLNAI, Mussolini and several gerarchi decided to flee northwards. A column of cars was formed and headed towards Como. Among these there was an Alfa Romeo 6C 2500 Superleggera with the Spanish flag, driven by Marcello Petacci. He was travelling with his family and his sister Clara, sitting in the back. He had a false Spanish diplomatic passport in the name of Don Juan Muñez y Castillo and declaring himself to be unrelated to the convoy in which Mussolini was hiding with the gerarchi, passed himself off as the Spanish consul and Clara passing as his wife. Walter Audisio (the partisan leader who later handed over Mussolini and Clara Petacci) initially mistook him for Vittorio Mussolini, but after reaching the entrance of the town hall of Dongo with his car, the partisan Urbano Lazzaro (nicknamed "Bill") unmasked his true identity because of an inconsistency between his passport and that of his wife.

Upon the request of the gerarchi themselves, as they did not consider Petacci one of them but rather a "pimp", it was decided that Petacci would be shot in a separate execution on the lakefront of Dongo on 28 April after the other gerarchi. Petacci tried to escape by throwing himself into the lake but was riddled with machine-gun shots.

== Aftermath ==
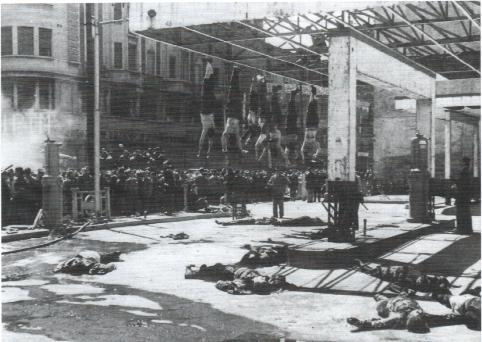
The bodies of Mussolini, Clara Petacci and the other fascists with Marcello Petacci in Piazzale Loreto, Milan

Petacci's corpse and those of the other fifteen shot were taken to Milan. His body was exposed in Piazzale Loreto at 03:00 am on 29 April together with those of Mussolini and the others, which were hanged upside down; to these corpses was added that of Achille Starace, who had a summary trial at the Polytechnic of Milan and was shot near the bodies of the other gerarchi. On 10 August 1944 the square had been the scene of the execution by the Germans of 15 Italian partisans, as a reprisal for a partisan attack on a German military convoy. On that occasion the bodies were left on display for a number of days.

Around 3 p.m. on 29 April, the American military command ordered the 19 bodies to be taken by lorry to the municipal morgue in Via Ronzo no. 1; Petacci's body was then taken to the Maggiore Cemetery and buried as unknown in field 16, where those of Mussolini and Achille Starace were already located. On 17 August 1945 his body was recognised; in 1951 a survey of the grave was carried out under the fictitious name "Mario Conterini", but the body allegedly did not correspond to Petacci's characteristics. In March 1957 his body and that of Clara were buried in the family tomb at the Verano Cemetery in Rome thanks to the permission given by Interior Minister Fernando Tambroni.

Petacci's wife Zita Ritossa (who died in 1987) and his sons Ferdinando and Benvenuto would be kept in Luigi Longo's custody from 28 April to 2 May when, according to Ferdinando, she was repeatedly tortured by the partisans. On 2 May, the Freedom Volunteers Corps granted her a pass to join her family in Milan.

== Sources ==
- De Felice, Renzo (1996) [1981]. Mussolini. Il Duce. 2: Lo stato totalitario, 1936–1940 (in Italian) (2 ed.). Torino: Einaudi.
- De Felice, Renzo (1996) [1990]. Mussolini. L'Alleato. 1: L'Italia in guerra II: Crisi e agonia del regime (in Italian) (2 ed.). Torino: Einaudi. ISBN 8806195697.
