= Rina Melli =

Italian journalist

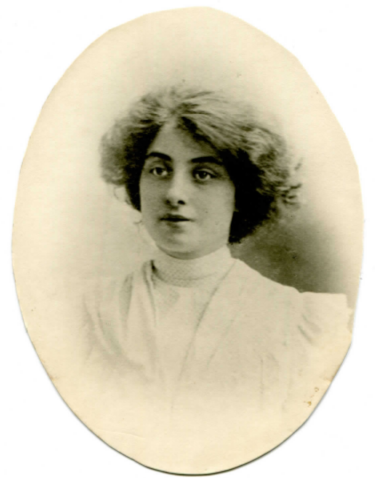
- Born: 3 November 1882; Ferrara, Italy
- Died: 25 March 1958 (aged 75); Pavia, Italy
- Occupations: Socialist activist, feminist, journalist
- Known for: Founding Eva magazine

Rina Melli (3 November 1882 – 25 March 1958) was an Italian socialist activist, feminist, journalist, and founder of the first socialist women's magazine Eva.

== Biography ==
The first of four children born to her parents in Ferrara, Rina was privately educated; for this purpose the father chose to entrust her to a young Italian teacher of Ferrara: Paolo Maranini. The two, she aged fourteen and he in his twenties, began a lifelong love affair. Paolo Maranini, when he met Rina, had already been the manager of the Ferrara socialist circle Figli del Lavoro for two years; this meant that Melli received from him, in addition to Italian lessons, a political education. Soon Rina became an active member of the Ferrara socialist movement, with particular attention to the status of women workers.

In 1898, Paolo was arrested and Rina's father began to oppose his relationship with his daughter in a decisive manner; this meant that Rina, as soon as she turned eighteen, left her family to go and live with his family in the poor and popular district of the city, where after a few months she married Paolo. Having become a prominent member of the Ferrarese socialist movement, Rina founded the women's socialist magazine Eva, but in 1902 she had to move to Genoa with her husband due to friction and disagreements within the Socialist Party in Ferrara. Later that year, she was joined in Genoa by her mother and her three brothers, forced to leave Ferrara due to an unsustainable family situation and the excesses of her jealous and possessive father.

In 1903, Rina moved again with her family to Trento, to collaborate with her husband in Il Popolo by Cesare Battisti. Rina, in order to make her work as a columnist more effective, decided to learn German (Trentino was then Austrian) and to perfect her command of the language she moved for a time to Vienna with her eldest son Giuseppe Maranini. While there she collaborated with the magazine Arbeiter Zeitung under Victor Adler.

Following an illness of Giuseppe, who risked dying, Rina began to dedicate herself primarily to her family, ceasing to be a political militant. However she continued the collaboration with the printed paper and her socialist acquaintances; in particular, she collaborated with the Bietti publishing house, publishing a small Italian grammar book for German-speaking students and translating from German fairy tales and stories by Hans Christian Andersen. Some years after Paolo's death in Milan in 1941, Rina ended up moving to Pavia with her daughter Rosa, going to join her other daughter, Lorenza. She remained in Pavia until her death on 25 March 1958.

== Political activism ==
Rina worked for the Ferrarese socialist leadership group, organising the female component of the labor movement. She went to the Ferrara countryside to reach out to women workers.

Beginning in 1897, in the Ferrara countryside, an impressive wave of strikes had begun which lasted until 1902 and which, despite harsh repression, led tens of thousands of laborers and boars to abstain from work. The strikes highlighted the need to tackle the agrarian question, namely the seasonal chronic unemployment of the laborers and the unsustainability of the ancient relations between masters and settlers, which were gradually being replaced by new relations between wage laborers. That experience represented, with the struggles of Bologna, the heart of the strikes in Italy. The harsh repression, with arrests, trials and convictions, did not prevent wages from being raised thanks to those struggles and the commitment to draw up new colonial contracts, written for the first time.

Particularly painful was the condition of female work which, like child labor, did not enjoy legal protection. For this reason, Melli was particularly committed to union activity aimed at women workers, setting up leagues and organizing socialist circles, often dedicated to Anna Kuliscioff, whom she met. From February 1901, the Ferrara peasant movement undertook an extraordinary organizational and political growth that had no equal in any other Italian province.

Rina's fervent political activity and her consequent popularity made her the target of the opposing press. In reaction to the intrusion of women on political life, the Catholic paper Domenica dell'Operaia referred to her as "the Jewish woman Rina" and wrote: "We also had to get this to see the propaganda of socialism made by women, some of whom roam the countryside, talking in closed or open places, excite men and women to strike, to resist, build leagues and beat the bass drum for the cause of future collectivism. Women, women! It must be said that in them the hysterical phenomena have assumed frightening proportions."

== Journalist activity ==
Rina collaborated with the editorial staff of La Scintilla, a socialist magazine directed by her husband, writing articles on the condition of women and also intervening critically with respect to the initiatives of the socialist leadership.

Melli later felt the need to start a socialist newspaper aimed at women workers and that is why, on 15 June 1901, Eva became the first women's magazine published in Italy. The aim was to educate women workers (especially agricultural workers) in politics through the newspaper, using simple language that is also accessible to those who did not have high levels of education, in order to accelerate the growth of the socialist movement. From the articles published in Eva it clearly emerged that Rina's political stance was that of a reformist and humanitarian socialism, which had Camillo Prampolini as its inspiration.

However, the magazine did not deal only with the material conditions of working mothers: Eva published a column entitled "From the Field to the Table" inviting readers to study and participate in the vast intellectual movement that was taking place in the sense of "a continuous emancipation, a progressive elevation of the feminine soul." After moving to Genoa in 1902, Rina continued with the publication of Eva, which grew to produce six thousand copies. However, in August 1903 the publication of had to stop, due to both financial and family problems.
