= Marino Sinibaldi =

Italian journalist and literary critic

Marino Sinibaldi

Marino Sinibaldi (Italian: Marino Sinibaldi) is an Italian journalist and literary critic. He hosted radio programs on the National Public Radio Tre, where he was author and conductor of Fahrenheit and assistant director of Radio Rai programs. On the 3rd of August 2009, Marino Sinibaldi was appointed director of RadioTre.

He is co-founder of the journal Linea d’Ombra and he published Pulp. La Letteratura nell’era della simultaneità (Donzelli, 1997) and È difficile parlare di sé. Conversazione a più voci condotta da Marino Sinibaldi (Einaudi, 1999) translated into English as "It’s Hard to Talk about Yourself" (University of Chicago Press, 2003).
