= Biagio Bartalini =

Italian physician and botanist

Biagio Bartalini (1750–1822) was an Italian medical doctor and botanist born in Torrita di Siena.

From 1782 to 1822 he was director of the botanical garden in Siena, and in 1815–1819 was president of the Accademia dei Fisiocritici. In 1786 he was appointed to the chair of natural sciences at the University of Siena.

In 1776 Bartalini published Catalogo delle Piante dei dintorni di Siena, which was one of the earliest uses of Linnaean nomenclature in Italy.
