= Lucio de Risi =

Lucio de Risi (born 1953) is an Italian electrical engineer and the founder and CEO of MEGA International Srl.

== Biography ==
De Risi's father and grandfather owned a shoes manufactory for military and police use .; https://www.tf1info.fr/voyages/video-l-incroyable-tresor-des-napolitains-2187982.html

De Risi graduated with a degree in electrical engineering from the Politecnico di Napoli, now known as the University of Naples Federico II. In 1981, he received his Master's from the University of Pennsylvania after being awarded a scholarship from the Fulbright Association. His thesis was entitled A System for a Total Matching of Stereo Pairs of Images.

After graduation, De Risi began working for a small software consulting firm in Paris that was later acquired by Cap Gemini. He spun off the firm from Cap Gemini and created MEGA International Srl. He developed the company into a leading supplier of tools for business modeling and enterprise architecture modeling.

== Personal life ==
While a student in Philadelphia, he met Véronique, his future wife, with whome he has had three children. He moved to Paris with her and launched MEGA International in the French capital.

== Selected publications ==
- De Risi, Lucio (1981). "A System for a Total Matching of Stereo Pairs of Images". University of Pennsylvania ScholarlyCommons. Archived from the original on July 30, 2010.
