= Salvatore Farina =

Salvatore Farina may refer to:

- Salvatore Farina (novelist)
- Salvatore Farina (general)
- Salvatore Farina (essayist)
