= Roberto Poletti =

Italian journalist and politician (born 1971)

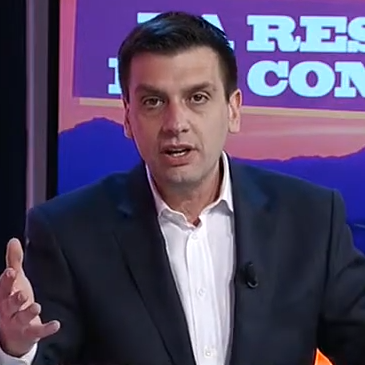
- Roberto Poletti in 2015
- Born: 29 July 1971 (age 55); Feltre, Belluno, Veneto, Italy
- Occupations: Journalist; politician; television presenter; radio personality; opinionist
- Years active: 1995–present
- Employer: Mediaset
- Television: Mediaset
- Height: 1.80 m (5 ft 11 in)
- Partner: Francesco Naccari

Roberto Poletti (born 29 July 1971) is an Italian journalist, politician, television presenter, radio personality and opinionist.

== Beginnings ==
Poletti was born on 29 July 1971 in Feltre, Italy. In the late 1980s, Poletti began to work with magazines and local radio stations in the province of Belluno, and for the journal Il Gazzettino. His first important work was in 1991 when, at twenty years old, he arrived at the journal L'indipendente of Vittorio Feltri. Poletti, who meanwhile was working with Epoca, Panorama, Cento Cose, Energy and Prima Comunicazione, leaving L'Indipendente and moved to Brazil, in Rio de Janeiro, where on behalf of the Italian Chamber of Commerce of São Paulo coordinates a project a project communication and integration of Italians who emigrated to South America. He also conducts a newscast in Italian on a Brazilian television network, and he is a correspondent from Brazil of the newspapers: Il Gazzettino, Il Tempo, Il Giornale di Sicilia, La Sicilia and L'Eco di Bergamo, he returned in Italy in 1997, working for the journal La Padania.

A professional journalist since 1995, after the experience with Radio 24, the radio channel of Il Sole 24 Ore, he arrived at Telelombardia, where he leads the press in the morning Buongiorno Lombardia and the news programmes in the early evening. He was also director of Radio Padania Libera, contributing to the success of the initial radio of Lega Nord.

== Success in Lombardy ==
Poletti establishes a direct relationship with the public, politicians and phone calls made in the studio without filters and without exchange. On numerous occasions, in the studio brings workers from factories that are closing or students who are demonstrating. In the autumn of 2004, he arrived on the national circuit with 7 Gold and the program Aria Pulita, where he manages to put together a real popular uprising to block a bipartisan proposal for the extension of electoral reimbursements also to elections. In December of that year, he left the studios of Legnano for the Channel Antenna 3 to conduct Carta Straccia.

== Political career ==
In February 2006, Roberto Poletti accepted the nomination for election to the Federazione dei Verdi, and he became a member following the resignation of Carlo Monguzzi. He was a member of the Committee on Culture, Science and Education and a member of the House Foreign Affairs Committee. In the Chamber of Deputies, he collides with the Verdi and reports to the public the internal scandals of the Parliament. On 30 October 2007, he joined the group the Sinistra Democratica, to prevent it from melting. On 3 February 2008, he announced on live TV that he would leave the Chamber of Deputies, publicly declaring to be ashamed of earning a salary so generous without being able to do anything in Parliament. So then, he wrote a series of scandal investigations for the newspaper Libero.

== Return to Telelombardia and Antenna 3 ==
From 2008, he has held a regular column in the newspaper every day on Libero, and he returned to TV, working again for the political programmes on Antenna 3 and Telelombardia.
