= Miriam di San Servolo =

Italian actress (1923–1991)

- Born: 31 May 1923; Rome, Lazio, Italy
- Died: 24 May 1991 (aged 67); Rome, Lazio, Italy
- Occupation: Actress
- Years active: 1942–1954 (film)

Miriam di San Servolo (born Maria Petacci; 31 May 1923 – 24 May 1991) was an Italian actress, born in Rome, Italy.

Her elder sister, Clara Petacci, Benito Mussolini's mistress, was executed along with their brother Marcello on 28 April 1945. After the Second World War she emigrated to Francoist Spain where she continued to appear in films for several years.

== Selected filmography ==
- The Emigrant (1946)
- Confidences (1948)
- Doña María the Brave (1948)
- Tempest (1949)
- Tormented Soul (1950)
- One Step to Eternity (1954)

== See also ==
- Death of Benito Mussolini
