= Mattias Mainiero =

Italian journalist and editor in chief (1955–2026)

- Born: 6 June 1955; Torre del Greco, Italy
- Died: 3 April 2026 (aged 70)
- Years active: 1979–20??

Mattias Mainiero (6 June 1955 – 3 April 2026) was an Italian journalist and editor in chief.

== Biography ==
Mainiero was born in Torre del Greco, Naples, Italy. He started his career as journalist in 1979, writing for the newspaper Vita. In 1981 he moved to the Giornale d'Italia. In 1984 Mainiero agreed to become editor of Giornale d'Italia and after of Fiorino. He was editor until 1987. After, he contributed to other newspapers and magazines, like Il Borghese and Il Messaggero. In 2000, he passed to the right-wing newspaper Libero. He wrote L'Italia racconta e Scritti pirati. For Libero and Libero online he wrote the daily newspaper column A tu per tu.
