= Syria Poletti =

Argentinian poet and writer

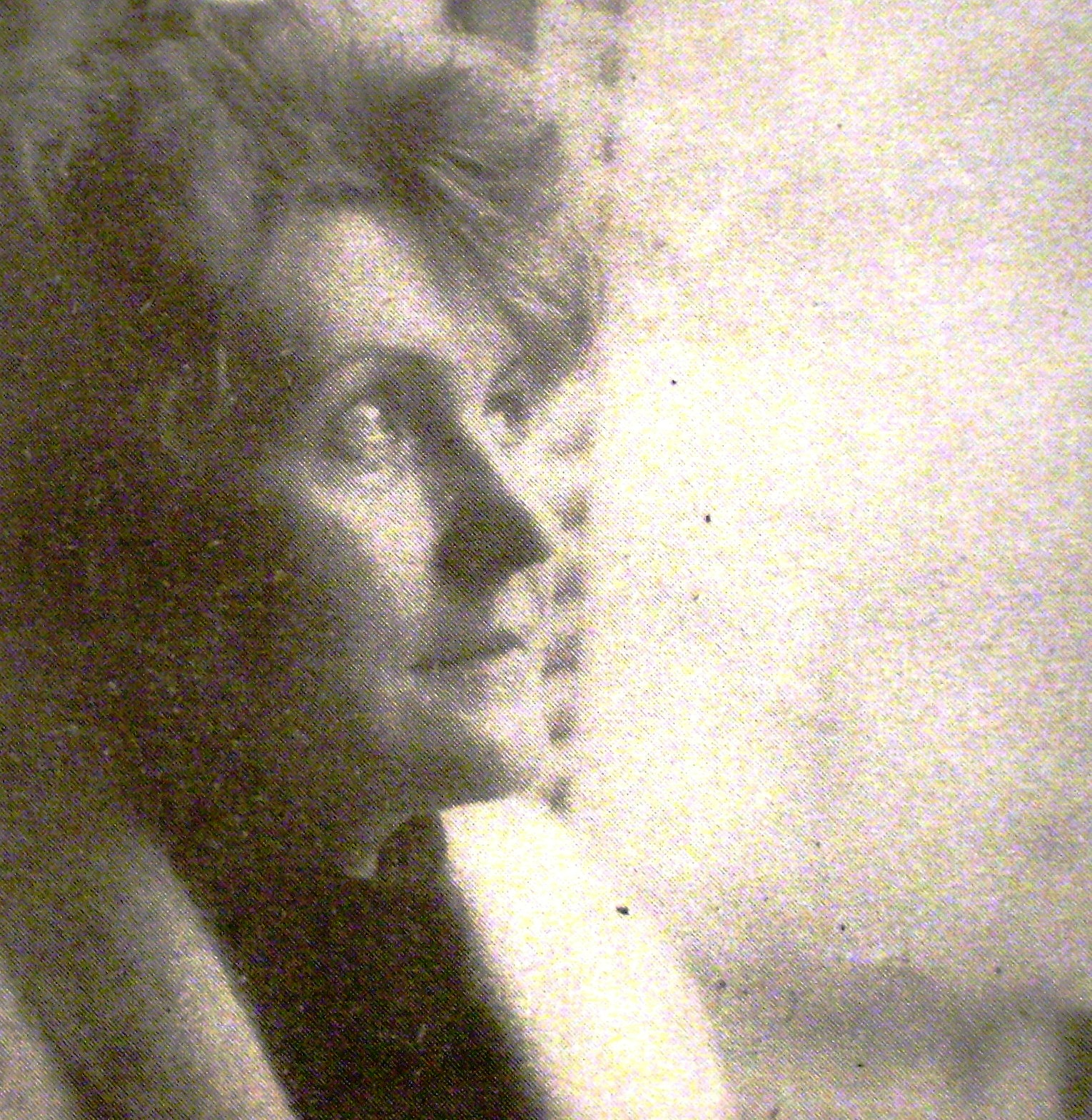
- Syria Poletti in 1968
- Born: 10 February 1917; Pieve di Cadore, Italy
- Died: 11 April 1991 (aged 74); Buenos Aires, Argentina
- Writing career
- Language: Spanish
- Genre: Children's literature

Syria Poletti (10 February 1917 – 11 April 1991) was an Argentine writer who specialized in children's literature.

== Personal life ==
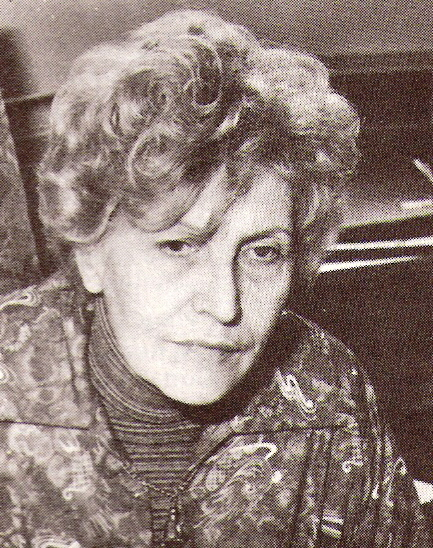

Syria Poletti's parents, José Poletti and Juana Pasquali, emigrated to Argentina from Italy when she was nine years old, leaving her in the charge of her grandmother, who fulfilled the role of mother. During her adolescence, she lived in an orphanage. At age 21 she graduated and decided to travel to Argentina, but the spinal deformity scoliosis which she suffered from was an impediment to emigration. Her sister Beppina traveled to Buenos Aires and was able to obtain a permit, allowing Syria to make the trip to the country where she would become a writer.

== Career ==
Between 1939 and 1944 she was director of the Dante Alighieri school in Cañada de Gómez. In 1946 she graduated as a teacher and translator, receiving a degree from the National University of Córdoba.

After this, she began journalistic activities in important media, and in 1953 started writing stories for the newspaper La Nación. In 1954 she published Veinte poemas infantiles (Twenty Children's Poems). She also contributed to the magazine Vea y Lea, where she wrote short stories.

The publication of her first novel in 1961, Gente conmigo, met with great success. It received the Losada International Award and the Municipal Prize of Buenos Aires, and was adapted into a film in 1965 (screenplay by Jorge Masciángoli, directed by Jorge Darnell). The novel was translated into German, Czech, English, and Italian.

In 1965, Poletti was awarded the Doncel Prize in Madrid for her short story book Botella al mar. For her book Historias en rojo, she again received the Municipal Prize of Buenos Aires in 1969. In addition she received the Ribbon of Honor from the Argentine Society of Writers, and the Grand Knight of the Star of Solidarity, given by the Italian government for her cultural work in Italy and Argentina.

Poletti's work often dealt with the challenges faced by Italian immigrants in rural Argentina and in Buenos Aires. Along with Ernesto Sabato, she is regarded as one of the most influential Italo-Argentine writers.

== Published works ==
- 1954 Veinte poemas infantiles.
- 1961 Gente conmigo (novel)
- 1964 Línea de fuego (stories)
- 1971 Extraño oficio (Crónicas de una obsesión) (novel)
- 1972 Reportajes supersónicos (children's book)
- 1977 Taller de imaginería
- 1978 El misterio de las valijas verdes (children's novel)
- 1981 Amor de alas (novel)
- 1981/1982 El rey que prohibió los globos (children's story), Ediciones de Arte Gaglianone
- 1985 Alelí y el payaso Bum Bum (children's book)
- 1987 Cien cuentos de Syria Poletti (selection of children's stories)
- 1988 Las hadas hacen dedo
- 1989 ...Y llegarán Buenos Aires
- 1991 El terror de la selva
- 1991 Una ventana a la vida
- 1992 Las siete hermanitas

== Prizes and honors ==
- Losada International Award, 1961
- Second Municipal Prize, 1962
- First Municipal Prize, 1967
- Doncel International Prize for children's stories, Spain, 1965
- IBBY Prize (UNESCO) for children's work, Germany, 1972
- Sixto Pondal Ríos Award for established authors, 1984
- Award of the Argentine Chamber of Publications, 1984
- Award of the Argentine Association of Reading, 1984
- Platinum Konex Award for Children's Literature, 1984
- Diploma of Merit (Konex) for Children's Literature, 1984
- UNESCO Prize, Japan, 1985
- Distinction of Cavaliere Ufficiale, given by the Italian government, 1988
