= Lac de Goria =

Lake in Corsica, France

- Location within Corsica
- Location: Corsica
- Coordinates: 42°13′20″N 9°0′18″E
- Type: glacial
- Basin countries: France
- Surface area: 0.04 km^{2} (0.015 sq mi)
- Max. depth: 7 m (23 ft)
- Surface elevation: 1,852 m (6,076 ft)

Lac de Goria is a lake in Corsica, France. At an elevation of 1852 m, its surface area is 0.04 km².
