= Goria, Bhopal =

Goria
- village
- Location within Madhya Pradesh Location within India
- Coordinates: 23.8226036°N 77.3984704°E
- Country: India
- State: Madhya Pradesh
- District: Bhopal
- Tehsil: Berasia
- Elevation: 522 m (1,713 ft)

Population (2011)
  - Total: 147
- Time zone: UTC+5:30 (IST)
- ISO 3166 code: MP-IN
- 2011 census code: 482337

Goria is a village in the Bhopal district of Madhya Pradesh, India. It is located in the Berasia tehsil.

== Demographics ==
According to the 2011 census of India, Goria has 21 households. The effective literacy rate (i.e. the literacy rate of population excluding children aged 6 and below) is 50.93%.

Demographics (2011 Census)
	Total	Male	Female
Population	147	82	65
Children aged below 6 years	39	22	17
Scheduled caste	0	0	0
Scheduled tribe	0	0	0
Literates	55	39	16
Workers (all)	67	35	32
Main workers (total)	66	34	32
Main workers: Cultivators	46	29	17
Main workers: Agricultural labourers	10	4	6
Main workers: Household industry workers	8	0	8
Main workers: Other	2	1	1
Marginal workers (total)	1	1	0
Marginal workers: Cultivators	0	0	0
Marginal workers: Agricultural labourers	0	0	0
Marginal workers: Household industry workers	0	0	0
Marginal workers: Others	1	1	0
Non-workers	80	47	33
