= Carlo Grande (writer) =

Italian writer, screenwriter and journalist

Carlo Grande (born 10 February 1957) is an Italian writer, screenwriter and journalist. He works for several newspapers including La Stampa and La Repubblica. and has written several novels.

== Selected bibliography ==
- I cattivi elementi (2000)
- La via dei lupi (2006)
