= Salvatore Falco =

Italian journalist

Salvatore Falco is an Italian journalist. He won a national journalism prize in 2006.

Falco took part in the investigative journalism show Lavori in Corso (Work in Progress), during which he conducted journalistic investigation about illegal immigrants. The resulting documentary was entitled New Slaves.
