= Franco Mimmi =

Italian journalist and novelist

Franco Mimmi (born 15 August 1942 in Bologna, Italy) is an Italian journalist and novelist.

He has written for some Italian newspapers such as Il Resto del Carlino, La Stampa, Il Corriere della Sera, L'Espresso, Il Sole-24 Ore and L'Unità.

Some of his books have been translated into French, German and Spanish.

Novels and Tales

- Rivoluzione (1979, "Scanno Opera Prima" prize)
- Relitti-A Tale of Time (1988)
- Villaggio Vacanze (1994)
- Il nostro agente in Giudea (2000, "Scerbanenco-La Stampa" prize)
- Un cielo così sporco (2001)
- Amanti latini, la storia di Catullo e Lesbia (con Carlo Frabetti, 2001)
- La guerra es la madre de todas las cosas (in "Daños colaterales", 2002)
- Vom Vater und vom Sohn (in "Schwarze Gedanken: Kriminelle Geschichten", 2002)
- Cavaliere di Grazia (2003, nominated for the "Premio dei Lettori" and "Città di Scalea" prizes)
- Una vecchiaia normale (2004)
- I grandi seduttori sono lupi solitari - Racconti di coppia (2005)
- Holbox (2005) (in "Brivido Nero" with Valerio Massimo Manfredi)
- Povera spia (2006)
- Lontano da Itaca (2007)
- Oracoli & Miracoli (2009)
- Tra il Dolore e il Nulla (2010)
- Corso di lettura creativa (2011)
- Una stupida avventura (2012)
- Il tango vi aspetta (2013)
- Majorca, l'isola degli scrittori (2014)
- Le tre età dell'uomo (2015)
- L'ultima avventura di Don Giovanni (2015)
- Le sette vite di Sebastian Nabokov - Secondo corso di lettura creativa (2016)
- Racconti di coppia (2016)
- Il Sogno dello Scrittore (2017)
- Fabrizio D. e la Bellezza - Passioni 1 (ebook-selfpublishing - 2018)
- Su l'arida schiena del formidabil monte sterminator (2018)
- Del Padre e del Figlio - Passioni 2 (ebook-selfpublishing - 2019)
- Ancora Venezia - Passioni 3 (ebook-selfpublishing - 2019)
- Amanti latini, la storia di Ovidio e Giulia, (2020)
- Il Topo e il Virus (ebook-selfpublishing - 2020)
- Il peggior nemico (2022)

Essays

- Il giornalismo nella letteratura italiana moderna e contemporanea (Slavia, 2010–1)
- Ulisse: uno, cento, mille viaggi (El tema del viaje - Universidad de Castilla-La Mancha)
- Imparare a leggere (Slavia, 2010–4)
- L’Unità d’Italia - Ilusión e delusioni nelle pagine di tre grandi scrittori: Anna Banti, Tomasi di Lampedusa, Federico de Roberto (Università di Cordoba - Convegno su "ITALIA 150 AÑOS DESPUÉS DE LA UNIFICACIÓN")
- Giorgia Marangon, "La poesía de Ugo Foscolo y su alter ego en francés" (Cuadernos de Filología Italiana, Vol 21–2014)
- La mejor amiga del COVID-19 (Conferencia Inaugural de la Feria Internacional del Libro en Guatemala, 26-11-2020)
- Quando Dante inventò Ulisse (Conferenza all'Istituto Italiano di Cultura di Guatemala per l'anno di Dante, 10-06-2021)

Critical Studies on his Works

- Manuel Gil Rovira, University of Salamanca:"Notas sobre dos periodistas narradores: Manuel Vázquez Montalbán y Franco Mimmi".
- Marjatta Saksa: review of "Cavaliere di grazia" in “NOBILTÀ - Rivista di Araldica, Genealogia, Ordini Cavallereschi”, 2004.
- Maria Dolores Castro Jiménez, Complutense University of Madrid:"Ítaca te regaló un hermoso viaje: estudio mitográfico del Ulises de Franco Mimmi".
- Mercedes Monmany: "El dilema del regreso".
- Ferdinando Castelli S.I.: "Variazioni sul tema Gesù - Opere di Sebastiano Vassalli e Franco Mimmi.". La Civiltà Cattolica, 21 maggio 2011.
- Arnaud Dubergier: "Écritures et réécritures: le Nouveau Testament dans les fictions contemporaines - ...Chacune à leur manière les réécritures de Michael Moorcock, « Voici l’homme », Anthony Burgess, « L’homme de Nazareth » et Franco Mimmi, « Notre agent en Judée », portent un regard neuf sur la vie du Nazaréen." (PhD Thesis - 2006)
- Rosanna Morace: "E se la letteratura italiana fosse un trittico?" (La Modernità Letteraria - 8 . 2015)
- Rosanna Morace: “La partenza: lontano da Itaca” (in “Il ponte Ionio-Adriatico: un confine liquido”, intervento presentato al convegno “Tra Adriatico e Ionio”, Corfù 2020)
