= MEGA International S.A. =

French software company

MEGA International
- Company type: Private
- Industry: Enterprise Architecture, IT Strategy and Planning, Business Process Analysis, Customer Journey, GRC
- Founded: 1991
- Founder: Lucio de Risi
- Headquarters: Paris, France.
- Area served: North America, South America, Europe, Asia, Middle East, Turkey, Southeast Asia, South Africa, Singapore
- Key people: Lucio de Risi (founder)
- Products: MEGA Suite; HOPEX
- Website: www.mega.com

MEGA International is a French software company founded by Lucio de Risi in 1991 in Paris in France as a spin off from Capgemini, and is known for the modeling tools, in the domain of Enterprise Architecture and Enterprise Governance Risk and Compliance (software) (GRC).

MEGA International is a member of the Object Management Group (OMG), and participates in their publications, and a member of The Open Group.
