= Susanna Cutini =

Italian journalist, academic, and chef

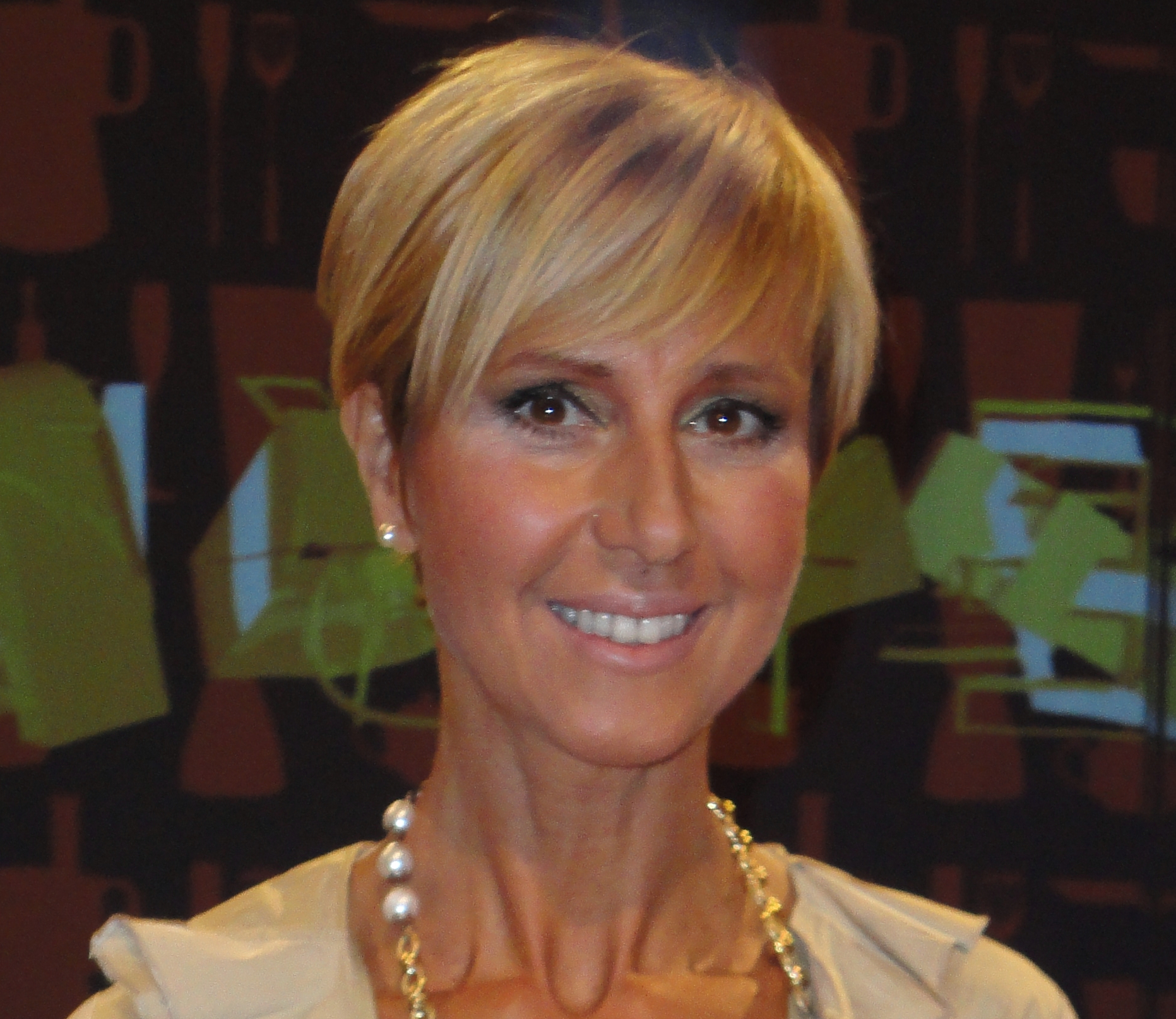
- Born: 1962 (age 63–64); Arezzo, Italy
- Occupation: Italian journalist
- Spouse: Alex Revelli Sorini

Susanna Cutini (born in Arezzo, Italy, 1962) is a journalist, a chef and a scholar of Italian recipes. She works for the University of Siena as an expert in the history of cooking, and has programs on RAI and Sky Television.

== Biography ==
Susanna Cutini began her career in the early 1990s focused on communications linked to the history of gastronomy and cooking techniques. In a number of newspapers, radio and television interviews, she tried to blend tradition and innovation in cooking.

In the 2000s, she worked at the University of Siena at the Arezzo Faculty for Humanities and Philosophy with Master Le Rotte del Gusto.

She was the director and co-founder of the magazine taccuinistorici.it, and she directs the laboratories of the Italian cuisine Gastronomy Historical. She also founded the Social Cooking Italian courses for food and beyond.

In 2011, Cutini won the International Award Silver Venus of Erice (TP) in the category "Gastronomic Literature".

== Publications ==
She is the author of essays on historical and traditional recipes and she has written for the series "Tacuinum" published by Ali&no publishing

- 2012 - Tacuinum de' dolci. Mouth-watering recipes in Italian history.
- 2011 - De' Hostarie - the food in the history of the wayfarers
- 2010 - Tacuinum Bizantino - gastronomic route in the Eastern Mediterranean
- 2009 - De'Eccellentissimi - tastes and recipes of famous people in history
- 2008 - SPQR at the table with the emperors
- 2007 - De’ Afrodisiaci - the recipes of seduction
- 2006 - Templars and the diet of the warrior monks
- 2005 - Geniuses of the Renaissance at the table
- 2004 - Etruscan Archaeology gastronomic
- 2003 - Itinerary of Italian food and wine Medieval
- 2002 - Truffle diamond of the kitchen

== Collaborations on television and radio ==
- RAI1 ed. 2011-2012 expert in the history of food traditions in the program Occhio alla Spesa
- SKY Italia ed. 2011 presenter and author of "Bengodi" program dedicated to food consumption consciousconsapevole
- RADIORAI 1 ed. 2008/9 curator in the "Notte di Radio 1" of phonebook of Monday of review of books on food & wine
- Sky/ALICE ed. 2006/7 sent outside of "A tavola con la storia" TV program dedicated to the knowledge of traditions and food
- Mediaset/RETE4 ed. 2004/5 expert in the history of Mediterranean cuisine to “Fornelli in Crociera”
