= Roberto Beccantini =

Italian sports journalist

Roberto Beccantini (born 20 December 1950 in Bologna) is an Italian sports journalist.

== Career ==
He started writing for Tuttosport on 20 August 1970. On 1 March 1981, Beccantini transferred to La Gazzetta dello Sport. He was head of the department for international football of La Gazzetta dello Sport. He switched to La Stampa on 1 February 1992. Beccantini was one of the first journalists who reported on the 2006 Italian football scandal. In 2011, he won the Nando Martellini journalism award.

== Authored books ==
- Dizionario del calcio. Milan. 1990. ISBN 8817145211.
- Juve ti amo lo stesso. Milan. 2007. ISBN 8804569069.
- Juventus. Quei derby che una signora non dimentica. Scarmagno. 2007. ISBN 8880683810.
