= La Stampa =

Italian daily newspaper (founded 1867)

- Front page, 10 December 2006
- Type: Daily newspaper
- Format: Berliner
- Owner: GEDI Gruppo Editoriale
- Publisher: GEDI Gruppo Editoriale
- Editor: Andrea Malaguti
- Founded: 1 February 1867; 159 years ago
- Political alignment: Social liberalism; Progressivism; Formerly: Fascism (1925–1945); Anti-communism
- Language: Italian
- Headquarters: Via Marenco 32, Turin, Italy
- Circulation: 256,203 (2012)
- Sister newspapers: la Repubblica (since 2017)
- ISSN: 1122-1763
- Website: www.lastampa.it

La Stampa (lit. 'The Press') is an Italian daily newspaper. Headquartered in Turin and owned by the Agnelli family, La Stampa is one of Italy's oldest and most prominent national newspapers.

== History ==
In February 1867, the paper was founded by journalist and novelist Vittorio Bersezio, with the name Gazzetta Piemontese. In 1895, the newspaper was bought, and by then edited, by Alfredo Frassati (father of Pier Giorgio Frassati), who gave it its current name and a national perspective. For criticizing the 1924 murder of the socialist Giacomo Matteotti, he was forced to resign and sell the newspaper to Giovanni Agnelli, who cofounded the automobile manufacturer Fiat. The financier Riccardo Gualino also took a share.

Until the late 1970s and early 1980s, when Italy underwent a nationalization process, La Stampa and Corriere della Sera were not real national daily newspapers, as their geographical area of circulation was mostly limited to Piedmont for La Stampa and Lombardy for Corriere della Sera; thus, both papers shared a readership that was linked to its place of residence and its social class, mostly from the industrialist class and financial circles. The paper is now owned by GEDI Gruppo Editoriale. The former contributors of La Stampa include Italian novelist Alberto Moravia. In 2004, Angelo Agostini categorized La Stampa as an institution daily (quotidiano-istituzione), alongside Corriere della Sera, in contrast to the agenda daily (quotidiano-agenda) such as la Repubblica, and the activist daily (quotidiano-attivista) such as Il Foglio, Libero, and l'Unità.

La Stampa, based in Turin, was published in broadsheet format, until November 2006, when the paper began to be published in the Berliner format. La Stampalaunched a website in 1999 as well as a project called Vatican Insider, the latter of which run by the daily newspaper and has among its staff several Vatican affairs analysts. Since 26 May 2006, it has published the monthly magazine Specchio+. From 26 January 1996 to 7 April 2006, it was called Specchio, which was published as a weekly supplement, a general interest magazine. In September 2012, La Stampa moved to its new headquarters in Turin, leaving its historical editorial building. Mario Calabresi was the editor-in-chief of the daily.

On 9 April 2013, an explosive device was sent by an insurrectionary anarchist group – the Informal Anarchist Federation – to the offices of La Stampa; it did not detonate. In June 2017, during the celebration for its 150 years of activity, La Stampa hosted the international conference "The Future of Newspaper", where many great actors of the news industry discussed the future prospects for the news agencies. Among them John Elkann, editor of La Stampa; Jeff Bezos, owner of The Washington Post; Louis Dreyfus, CEO of Le Monde; and Mark Thompson, CEO of The New York Times.

In April 2020, Maurizio Molinari was replaced by Massimo Giannini (former journalist of la Repubblica and Radio Capital). Under his guide, La Stampa moved to a more marked centre-left position.

== Circulation ==
The 1988 circulation of La Stampa was 560,000 copies. In 1997, the paper had a circulation of 376,493 copies. Its circulation was 399,000 copies in 2000, and 409,000 copies in 2001. The circulation of the paper was 330,000 copies in 2003, and 345,060 copies in 2004. Its 2007 circulation was 314,000 copies. In 2012, the circulation was 256,203 copies. In May 2023, an average circulation was 87,143 copies.

== Contributors ==
Editors

- Massimo Giannini (editor)
- Massimo Gramellini (vice-editor)
- Roberto Bellato (vice-editor)
- Umberto La Rocca (vice-editor)
- Federico Geremicca (vice-editor, Rome)

Columnists and journalists

- Massimo Gramellini (columnist)
- Barbara Spinelli (columnist)
- Mario Deaglio (columnist)
- Lucia Annunziata (columnist)
- Guido Ceronetti (columnist)
- Mina (columnist)
- Maurizio Molinari (journalist)
- Stefania Miretti (columnist)
- Roberto Beccantini (columnist)
- Altiero Scicchitano (columnist)
- Fiamma Nirenstein (columnist)

Former journalists

- Giovanni Arpino
- Adolfo Battaglia
- Enzo Bettiza
- Norberto Bobbio
- Antonio Carluccio
- Carlo Fruttero
- Franco Lucentini
- Lorenzo Soria
- Vincenzo Buonassisi

== Journalists ==
=== 20th century ===
- Giovanni Arpino
- Mario Bassi
- Enzo Bettiza
- Enzo Biagi
- Ugo Buzzolan
- Carlo Casalegno
- Alberto Cavallari
- Guido Ceronetti
- Giuseppe Depanis
- Rinaldo De Benedetti, noto come Didimo
- Umberto Eco
- Enrico Emanuelli
- Carlo Fruttero
- Virginio Gayda
- Carlo Laurenzi
- Emanuele Macaluso
- Igor Man
- Vittorio Messori
- Augusto Minzolini
- Leo Pestelli
- Guido Piovene
- Sandro Sandri
- Luisa Macina Gervasio, known as Luigi di San Giusto
- Alberto Savinio
- Barbara Spinelli
- Anacleto Verrecchia

=== 21st century ===
- Flavia Amabile
- Lucia Annunziata
- Marco Ansaldo
- Riccardo Barenghi
- Roberto Beccantini
- Enzo Bettiza
- Piero Bianucci
- Alberto Bisin
- Franco Bruni
- Mimmo Càndito
- Alessandra Comazzi
- Guido Ceronetti
- Maria Corbi
- Maurizio Cucchi
- Mario Deaglio
- Mattia Feltri
- Fabrizio Ferrari
- Paolo Gallarati
- Franco Garelli
- Federico Geremicca
- Massimo Gramellini (until 2017)
- Carlo Federico Grosso
- Jacopo Iacoboni
- Francesco La Licata
- Luigi La Spina
- Stefano Lepri
- Bernard-Henri Lévy (from 2018)
- Cesare Martinetti
- Fabio Martini
- Anna Masera
- Paolo Mastrolilli
- Alberto Mattioli
- Maria Teresa Meli (until 2015)
- Maurizio Molinari
- Gianluca Nicoletti
- Emanuele Novazio
- Francesca Paci
- Vittorio Emanuele Parsi
- Walter Passerini
- Flavia Perina
- Giorgio Pestelli
- Domenico Quirico
- Antonella Rampino
- Carla Reschia
- Luca Ricolfi (until 2014)
- Gian Enrico Rusconi
- Linda Laura Sabbadini
- Claudio Sabelli Fioretti
- Fabio Scuto
- Marcello Sorgi
- Lorenzo Soria (until 2020)
- Giordano Stabile
- Federico Varese

== See also ==
- List of newspapers in Italy
- Mass media in Italy
