= Maria Cuffaro =

Italian journalist

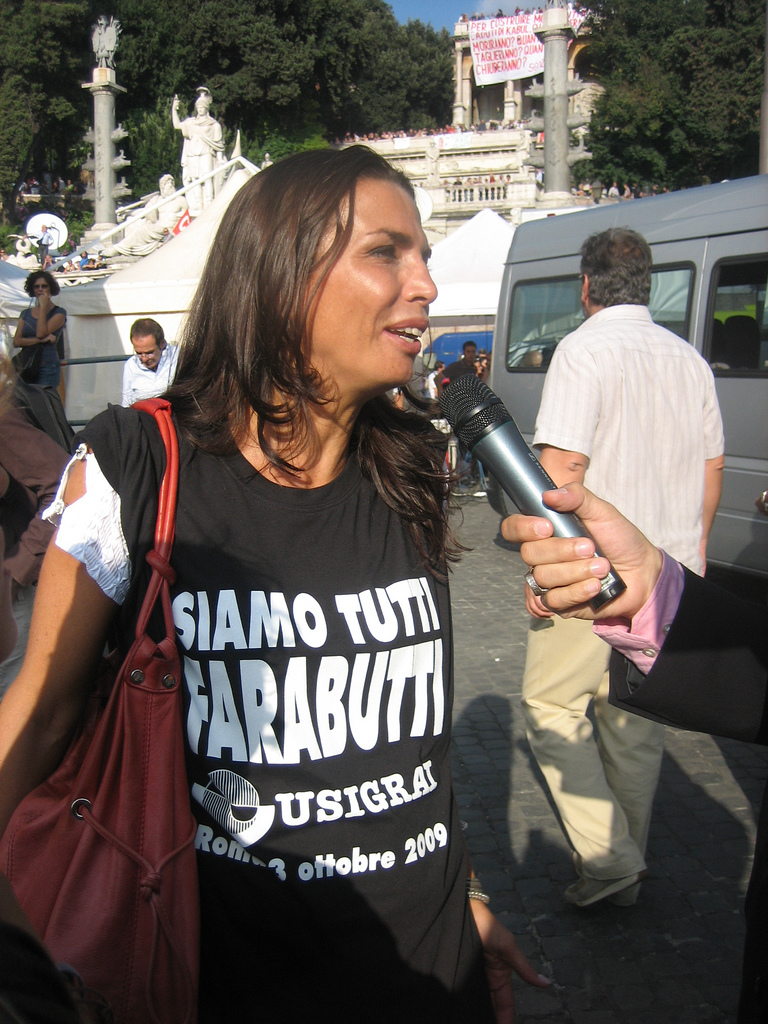
- Maria Cuffaro in 2009, interviewed at the national demonstration for freedom of information.
- Born: 18 August 1964 (age 62); Rome, Italy
- Occupation: Italian journalist

Maria Cuffaro (born 18 August 1964 in Rome) is an Italian journalist and host of TG3. She discovered a passion for journalism collaborating with il Manifesto, L'Espresso, Events and Chanel 4. She has been listed in the Register of Professional Journalists since 29 October 1992.

== Biography ==
Born to an Italian father from Sicily and Indian-Swiss mother, from 15 to 22 years old she painted and tried to launch her career as a painter with two personal exhibitions: At 16 years old she held her first exhibition of drawings at the gallery "il Torchio" in Rome (1980). At 20 years old, she held the second and final exhibition in Athens (1986). She worked for the art magazine Leader which, however, ceased publication after a few issues. From 1985 to 1986, Cuffaro was a teacher of English at two elementary schools in Rome. She then worked with il Manifesto, for whom she was sent to India, Pakistan and South Africa. In 1986 she became a radio broadcaster at Italia Radio, and also writes for Sette, Il Venerdì di Repubblica, Annabella, Avvenimenti (for this newspaper she has also edited a book on immigration), Die Tageszeitung, Nordreihnishcer Rundfunk (German radio) and Nuova Ecologia.

In 1989 Cuffaro headed the programme 'Il filo d'Arianna' on Rai 3, which deals with inquiries from abroad. In the following year, Sandro Curzi convinced her to join TG3. For a period, she presented the programme, and worked with Michele Santoro in broadcasting Il rosso e il nero, Il raggio verde and Tempo reale (1996). An investigative journalist, she has been to war zones and has produced numerous reports from Asia, Africa and South America.

In 1997, she wrote a series of documentaries for RAI 2 called Special 24hrs. In 1999, she wrote numerous documentaries for transmission on 'C'era una volta' for RAI3. In 2000, she returned to work with Michele Santoro on the documentaries Sciuscià. She participated in the 2000 edition of the World Social Forum.

Since June 2006, she has been a regular guest on the entertainment programme Matinee on Rai2 and led by Max Giusti and Sabrina Nobile. In 2011, during a service of the TG3 in Tunis, she was attacked with her cameraman Claudio Rubino, but still managed to return to the hotel without serious injury.

In 2012, by now a journalist at TG3 she published her autobiography Kajal. Le vite degli altri e la mia, published by Imprimatur.

In 2013 she opened the twelfth edition of Sabato del Villaggio, in the elegant surroundings of the Theater Umberto di Lamezia Terme.

Currently she is the host of TG3 Rai.

== Awards ==
- In 2005 she won the XI Edition of the award "Ilaria Alpi" for her report "Under the Bombs in Nasiriyah" concerning the siege of the Coalition Provisional Authority in Nasiriyah.
- In 2007 she won the journalism award 'Maria Grazia Cutuli' for the report from Nasiriyah with the Russian journalist Yulia Latynina.
