= Gianfranco Goria =

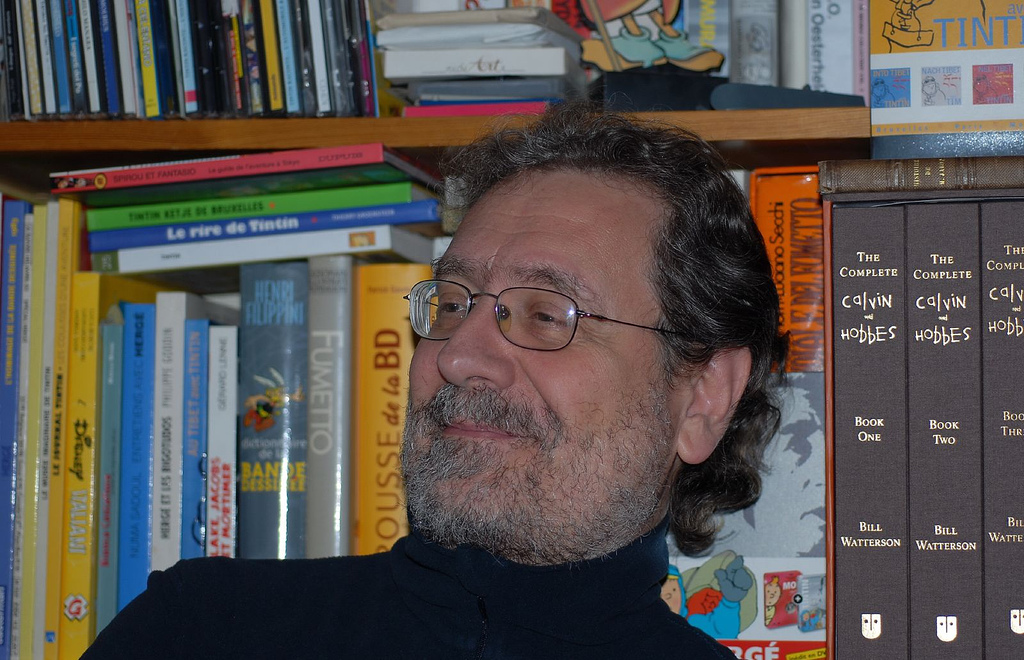
- Goria and his comics art books
- Born: 3 August 1954 Bruneck, Italy
- Areas: Writer, Artist
- Notable works: Italian Disney comics

Gianfranco Goria (born 3 August 1954, in Bruneck, Italy), is an Italian cartoonist, script-writer, Disney comics creator, blogger and journalist. Moved with his parents to Rome and then to Turin. He carried out his university studies at the University of Turin, under the guidance of the orientalist Oscar Botto.

He founded the Italian cartoonists society Anonima Fumetti, the daily news service afNews, the Foundation and Museum of Comic Art Franco Fossati, and the National Union of Comic Artists Sindacato italiano lavoratori fumetto. He is the editor of the Italian editions of important essays about comic art by Scott McCloud, Will Eisner and Benoit Peeters. Goria is also a teacher of Graphic Literature and lecturer, specialized in the works of Hergé (he was also in charge of the philological supervision of the new Italian edition of The Adventures of Tintin for Rizzoli Lizard) and Edgar Pierre Jacobs (Blake and Mortimer). Among his Disney stories, the special homage to Kurosawa's Seven Samurai. Since January 2023, he has been the first Honorary Consul of Syldavia in Italy.
