= Antenna 3 Lombardia =

Italian television channel

Antenna 3
- Country: Italy
- Broadcast area: Lombardia

Programming
- Language: Italian
- Picture format: 4:3 SDTV

Ownership
- Owner: Sandro Parenzo

History
- Launched: 3 November 1977

Links
- Website: https://www.mediapason.it/antenna3/

Availability

Terrestrial
- Digital: LCN 11

Antenna 3, formerly known as "Antenna 3 Lombardia" and also known as "Antennatre" is a private TV station. It was founded in Legnano in 1977 by Renzo Villa, a clerk of the municipality of Varese, who became a self made TV publisher. Enzo Tortora, a famous Italian showbiz personality, was instrumental in its founding.

Antenna 3 was one of the first Italian private TV stations, born once the state monopoly on television broadcasting was ended by the small TV station Telebiella. In those years Atennatre was the largest out of 1500 private Italian TV stations. Attenatre had one of the most modern broadcasting centers in Europe, and the biggest TV studio, the so-called "Studio 1".

It was established in Legnano, a small town in the suburbs of Milan, near Malpensa airport. Several very famous Italian TV personalities showman worked or started their career at Antennatre such as Ettore Andenna, Massimo Boldi and Teo Teocoli, Amanda Lear, Renato Rascel, Giorgio Faletti, Walter Chiari, Carmen Russo, Wilma De Angelis and Cino Tortorella worked at Antenna3 as director and writer.

Other important Italian television directors, such as Beppe Recchia and Paolo Beldì, and Davide Rampello worked in Antenna3 as well. The owner of the TV station himself, Renzo Villa, was one of the anchormen. Many famous technicians and managers of Italian television began their career working for Antenna3.

The TV shows were based on audience engagement and on enterprise generated content. For example the Italian songwriter Roberto Vecchioni, who was educated in classical literature and was a high school teacher, had an afternoon show that aided students on air with their Latin and Ancient Greek homework.

Renzo Villa, was the owner of the TV station until 1987 but from 2004, the station, which still exists today, has been owned by Telelombardia.

After his death in 2010, Renzo Villa's family, former employees, and friends, founded a charity association in his memory.

== Bibliography ==
- Aldo Grasso, La Tv del sommerso, Milano, Mondadori, 2006. ISBN 88-04-56194-7
- Giancarlo Dotto e Sandro Piccinini, Il mucchio selvaggio. La strabiliante, epica, inverosimile ma vera storia della televisione locale in Italia, Milano, Mondadori, 2006. ISBN 88-04-53952-6
- Joseph Baroni, Dizionario della Televisione. I programmi della televisione commerciale dagli esordi a oggi, Milano, Raffaello Cortina Editore, 2005. ISBN 88-7078-972-1
- Renzo Villa e Roberta Villa, Ti ricordi quella sera?, Edizione Televideo3, 2010. ISBN 978-88-905616-0-3
