= Giulio Cerreti =

Italian politician

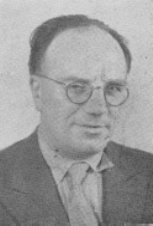
Giulio Cerreti

Giulio Cerreti (1903–1985) was an Italian politician and journalist. He was born in Sesto Fiorentino.
