= Ezio Bartalini =

Italian politician

Ezio Bartalini (24 June 1884 – 17 December 1962) was an Italian politician.

Bartalini was born in Monte San Savino. He represented the Italian Socialist Party in the Constituent Assembly of Italy from 1947 to 1948.
