= Luigi Romersa =

Luigi Romersa (July 5, 1917, in Boretto – March 19, 2007, in Rome) was an Italian journalist and writer who worked as a war correspondent during the Second World War. He probably was the only Italian to enter USA Army missile bases during the Cold War. He was a friend of Wernher von Braun. He was best known for his essays about World War II. He was married to Mary Kisselov.

== Biography ==
Romersa was born in Boretto, near Reggio Emilia, and studied Law in Parma. He started his journalistic career writing for the newspaper La Gazzetta di Parma (The Parma Gazette). He was at first a Benito Mussolini supporter, so he could move to Milan, where he worked for the newspaper Corriere della Sera (Evening Courier). Later, he moved to Rome, where he wrote for the local newspaper Il Messaggero (The Messenger).

On Mussolini's invitation, he went to Germany to be present for Nazi war experiments in October 1944 in Rügen Island, in the Baltic Sea: in fact Hitler wanted to show a new bomb to Mussolini.

After the war, he worked as a foreign reporter for the weekly magazine Tempo (Time) in Milan. He worked there for decades, traveling around the world, from the South Pole to Israel - during the Six-Day War - and Bahrain, where he covered the 1973 oil crisis. Romersa was also in Kindu, Democratic Republic of Congo, as well as in Port Said, Egypt, in 1956, to be present at French-English attack. He was also interested at NASA's Apollo program. In 1962, he won the Saint Vincent Prize for Journalism.

== Works ==
- Le armi segrete di Hitler (The Hitler's Secret Weapons)
- I segreti della guerra d'Africa
- I segreti della Seconda Guerra Mondiale (The World War II Secrets)
- Uomini della Seconda Guerra Mondiale
- All'ultimo quarto di luna
- Von Braun racconta (Von Braun remembers)
- I temerari del cielo
- España: 40 años y un día
