= Giuliano De Risi =

Italian journalist (born 1945)

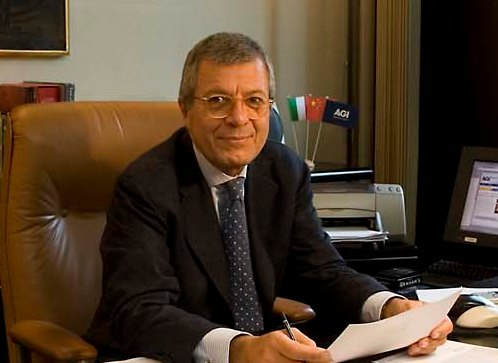
Giuliano De Risi

Giuliano De Risi (born 14 June 1945) is an Italian journalist.

He was Chief Editor from 2005 to November 2010 of AGI - Agenzia Giornalistica Italia. From May 2014 he was appointed Special Adviser in charge of International Relations and Communication in Italy ADA, Académie Diplomatique Africaine - Coalition for International Development. From 2011 to 2013 he was coordinator of the OIL Editorial, periodic energy culture Eni Group.

== Biography ==
De Risi was born on 14 June 1945 in Rome. Having embarked in a journalistic career at an early age, he was a foreign and cultural editor of the Voce Repubblicana, the Italian Republican Party's daily, and later collaborated with important Italian titles such as l’Astrolabio, directed by Ferruccio Parri, the first president of the Italian government council after World War II, l’Espresso, the Fiera Letteraria, l’Europeo, Aut and Mondo Nuovo, as well as with the RAI (the national broadcasting company) . He has been a director of Lazio, ieri oggi e domani, the journal of the Placido Martini Institute of Economic and Social Research.

Further, he was head of the public relations department of the Ministry of Transport and of the National Transport Plan, as well as the public relations consultant to the President of the Cassa per il Mezzogiorno (the agency for the development of the central and southern regions of Italy), a consultant to the EUR's Governance Commissary (the autonomous district of Rome), image consultant of Cap Gemini Italia and a member of the Foreign Investment Committee for the Mezzogiorno Region.

He collaborated in the investigative papers such as “Alarm: Are We Racists?” with the assistance of the Italian Immigrant association (1994), and "Prostitution, Drugs, AIDS, an emergency of humanity" (1994), with the participation of the Italian Red Cross. As director of AGI, he launched Agimondo.Org, the first official site of the Italian ONGs, AgiAfro, the first web site of African news about Africa, AGIChina24 and the first site for information and assistance to Italian entrepreneurs in China. He is now the curator of Food section of FIRSTonline, one of the principal economic and financial journal in Italy.

He is a member of the jury for several prices, such as: the Capri-Agnes prize for International Journalism, the Amalfi Media Coast Award, the Tevere Prize for Journalism and the Scanno Music Prize.

== Awards ==
- "The Journalist's Sign" from the Roman Journalists' Association, 1979.
- Distinguished with the silver medal with ribbon by the Czechoslovak Republic for a series of articles on the "Prague Spring" by Alexander Dubček.
- Ischia Prize for International Journalism and nominated Journalist of the Year by the media (press) agencies in 2008.
