= Giovanna Botteri =

Italian journalist

Giovanna Botteri (born 14 June 1957 in Trieste) is an Italian journalist and TV correspondent specialized in foreign politics.

Botteri’s father, Guido Botteri, was a journalist with Italy's national public broadcasting company, RAI. Her mother was a Montenegrin.

She holds a Ph.D. in history of cinema from the Sorbonne. From 1991 to 1996, she covered the Balkan conflict in Croatia and Bosnia. After a spell as a co-conductor with Michele Santoro of the TV programme “Samarcanda” on RAI 3, she worked for RAI 3 news programme TG3 as a correspondent from Algeria, South Africa, Iran, Albania and Kosovo. Since 2018 she is a political commentator and correspondent from New York.

In 2004 she received the prize "Archivio Disarmo - Golden Doves for Peace" awarded by IRIAD.
