= Mauro Suttora =

Italian journalist and author

Mauro Suttora (born 8 September 1959, Milan) is an Italian journalist and author.

From 1983 to 1995 Suttora worked for the weekly newsmagazine L'Europeo as a writer, special correspondent, and foreign desk editor. He covered the Iran–Iraq War, the 1988 first Palestinian Intifada, the 1989 Tiananmen Square protests, the 1990 Gulf War, the 1991 Moscow coup ousting Mikhail Gorbachev, the 1992–95 Yugoslav Wars.

Since 1995 Suttora has been senior editor of Oggi, the largest Italian weekly magazine, published by the Italian media conglomerate RCS Media Group. He was US Bureau Chief in New York from 2002 to 2006. He covered the 1999 Kosovo War, the 2001 Second Intifada, the 2011 Libyan Civil War, the 2008 Beijing and 2012 London Olympic Games. Since 2020 Suttora is a columnist of Huffington Post Italia

Suttora has contributed to Newsweek and The New York Observer as columnist.

== Bibliography ==
=== Italian ===
- Pannella, i segreti di un istrione (Liber, Milano, 1993) ISBN 88-8004-013-8
- Pannella & Bonino spa (Kaos, 2001) ISBN 88-7953-097-6
- Storia del castello di Oria, Brindisi (Gabbiano, 2001)
- Concupiscenza (I libri del Foglio, 2006)
- No Sex in the City (Cairo Publishing, 2006; second edition 2007) ISBN 88-6052-050-9
- Mussolini segreto, Claretta Petacci's diaries (editor; Rizzoli 2009; paperback Bur 2010) ISBN 978-88-17-03737-2

- Confini. Storia e segreti delle nostre frontiere (Neri Pozza, 2021) ISBN 978-88-545-2174-2
- Green. Storia degli ecologisti, da Celentano a Greta (Neri Pozza, 2025)

ISBN 978-88-545-3151-2

=== Spanish ===
- Mussolini secreto, los diarios de Claretta Petacci, Editorial Crìtica, 2010 ISBN 978-84-9892-135-9

=== Norwegian ===
- Jeg, il Duces kvinne, dagbøker 1932–1938, Forlaget Historie & Kultur, 2010 ISBN 978-82-92870-43-3

=== Polish ===
- Tajemnice Mussoliniego. Pamiętniki 1932–1938, Ksiegarnia Bellona, Polonia 2010 ISBN 978-83-11-11948-2

=== Russian ===
- CEKPETHbIE MYCCOLIHI, DHEBHIKI 1932–1938, Ripol Klassik, Russia 2013 ISBN 978-5-386-05064-1
