= Telecity (Italian TV channel) =

- Country: Italy
- Broadcast area: Piedmont, Aosta Valley, Lombardy and Liguria

Programming
- Language: Italian
- Picture format: 16:9 HDTV

Ownership
- Owner: Telecity 2 s.r.l. & Netweek S.p.A.

History
- Launched: 25 June 1977

Links
- Website: http://www.telecity.it/

Availability

Terrestrial
- DTT in Piedmont: LCN 10 (HD)
- DTT in Aosta Valley: LCN 10 (HD)
- DTT in Lombardy: LCN 13 (HD)
- DTT in Liguria: LCN 13 (HD)

Telecity is a historic private television broadcaster in Piedmont. It broadcast from Castelletto d'Orba, from the "Lavagello" dance hall, on the frequencies of UHF channel 65. It subsequently spread to Lombardy, Liguria and Aosta Valley. Since 1987 it has alternated regional programs with programs of national interest, first broadcasting with the Italia 7 logo and schedule, subsequently from 1999 broadcasting 7 Gold, and from 2024 becoming part of the new Netweek television circuit.

== History ==
=== 1976: the birth of Telecity Piemonte ===
Telecity was created in December 1976 in Castelletto d'Orba, in Alessandria Province, by Radio City, under the name TeleRadioCity.

Founded by initiative of Giorgio Tacchino, it was one of the first television networks, in 1977, to broadcast in color. The first headquarters of the broadcaster is in the studios of the "La Rotonda" maxidiscotheque, in via Lavagello 31 in Castelletto d'Orba. The initial catchment area was lower Piedmont.

The station aired films, TV series, cartoons (such as Steel Jeeg and Candy Candy), sports programs such as Flash sport, game shows, kids' shows, a mostly read news program and music of all types, especially disco and liscio. Many were the programs made with the help of anonymous DJs, which can only radiate vinyl records or cassettes and, in the luckiest cases, the first music videos, like those of Pink Floyd. From "Salone delle Feste", the show, which is repeated on several evenings, is hosted by Dino Crocco, who also presents alone in the morning, anticipating the style of the ballroom programs which today abound on local TV at lunchtime. Crocco, in fact, becomes one of the main faces of the station to the point that he presents six live evening broadcasts a week (Piano bar, Liscio o col ghiaccio, Il tombolotto, Liscio non-ti lascio, Il giocolone and Caccia al campione, five hours of live broadcast with illustrious guests in the fray and a final striptease that caused quite a stir). Among TeleRadioCity's other programs were Il mercatino and Il topoclub, the latter being a quiz show presented by Giusi Lercari with the hare Milcaro (alias Roberto Paravagna), the variety show Viva la gente and Video show, program of musical films hosted on alternate days by Paolo Vignolo known as "Pappo" and Giusi, Stiamo insieme stamattina, with Dede Vinci. The station also relays Superclassifica Show (music show syndicated to other local television stations), presented by Maurizio Seymandi, È fortissimo, presented by Sabina Ciuffini and Claudio Lippi, A tre passi dal successo, presented by Gianfranco D'Angelo and Annamaria Rizzoli, Sulla carozzella by Augusto Martelli, Viva la domenica, with Enzo Baldon e Palma Agati, Cosa bolle in pentola and the erotic segment Sexy follie airing late at night. Another successful show was Pigiama party, presented by a certain Massi, directed by Beppe Recchia, an erotic program anticipating the later Colpo Grosso. Also working at Telecity were Renzo Arbore, Patricia Pilchard, Barbara D'Urso, Meo Cavallero and Franco Dutto.

Also in 1977, its catchment area increased to all of Piedmont, Genova and Liguria, with some spillover in Lombardy (receivable with a significantly lower quality in Milan), on UHF channel 38.

=== 1978: the birth of Telecity Liguria ===
The broadcaster was founded in May 1978 as an independent structure of the Telecity of Castelletto d'Orba. Its first headquarters is in the grounds of the "Maddox" nightclub, in via XII Ottobre in Genoa. It was precisely in these "underground" studios that characters such as Corrado Tedeschi, Marco Predolin and many others coming mainly from the radio world were launched into the television panorama, also given the strong support of Radio City of Castelletto d'Orba, very popular at the time.

In January 1979 the broadcaster moved to a grandiose building near an abandoned cinema-theatre in via Trento 22/r, in whose gallery offices, the radio headquarters, control room, broadcasting, control units and a recording studio were created. Telecity Liguria also makes a large investment in technical equipment: cameras, video mixers, ampex video recorders, for a "Rai quality" image. Well-known personalities from the world of entertainment pass through the Genoese headquarters of the station: Raffaele Pisu with Gran Bazar (telesales ante-litteram), Ric and Gian, Enrica Bonaccorti, Oreste Lionello, Luciano Salce, Maria Grazia Buccella and directors from RAI such as Riccardo Valentini, Giancarlo Nicotra and Beppe Recchia.

=== 1979: the birth of Telecity Lombardia ===
In 1979, in the wake of the success of its older sister Telecity Piemonte of Castelletto d'Orba, Trc Lombardia was born, located in Assago (on the outskirts of Milan) in via Einstein. The cult program of this period is La prima volta che... with Ric and Gian, directed by Beppe Recchia. Some personalities such as Walter Chiari, Christian De Sica, Claudio Lippi and Barbara D'Urso collaborate with the broadcaster.

=== Telecity in the 80s ===
Teleradiocity was renamed Telecity. In the early 80s, Telecity Piemonte and Telecity Lombardia, which both had a combined schedule, even though with different programming in certain timeslots, merged with the Ligurian station to offer a single schedule from UHF channel 55. Among the most notable shows broadcast in that period are Il Citro, presented by Massimo Citro, Citylandia, afternoon variety show for children presented by Dino Crocco and filmed at Dancing "Lavagello" in Castelletto d'Orba, Anni Verdi, with Giusi Lercari and Il Leprotto Milcaro, Smart, film program presented by Beppe Fiorito, Campanili in festa, with Meo Cavallero, Pensieri e Parole, in-depth program Enzo Baldon, Sarah Destro and Gianpaolo Marchionni, the TV series The Cosby Show, telenovelas Capricci e passione and Disperatamente tua with Amanda Gutierrez.

From 1984, the station joins the Euro TV circuit. On 25 June 1987, for its tenth anniversary, it aired Buon compleanno Telecity, a special presented by Dino Crocco and Enzo Baldon, which re-proposes the broadcaster's best programs via archive images.

The UHF channels where Telecity broadcast from changed over time: 24 and 44 in Lombardy, 38 and 46 in Piedmont, 47 and 50 in Alessandria and province, 57 in Liguria.

In 1986, the second network is born, one of the first in Italy to have a second channel, Telestar.

=== Leaving "Euro TV" and the birth of "Italia 7" ===
In September 1987, alongside sister stations Telecity Liguria and Lombardia and other channels, Telecity leaves Euro TV (which became Odeon TV) to give birth to "Italia 7", becoming a relay network of programs broadcast throughout Italy. Among the programs broadcast were Ronin Warriors, Teenage Mutant Ninja Turtles, Saint Seiya, Robotech, BraveStarr and Fist of the North Star, most of which airing for the first time in Italy, films and TV series new to Italy (such as Falcon Crest), first-run American soap operas (Ryan's Hope, Days of Our Lives), sporting events (during the weekly program Italia 7 Sport) and especially the sexy-quiz Colpo Grosso, presented by Umberto Smaila, airing in a late prime slot.

In 1988 the new production center in Milan was inaugurated, located in Assago in via Idiomi, where, in addition to housing the Lombardy news editorial team, other local shows were recorded alongside the Castelletto d'Orba productions. In the following years, the local newspaper editorial offices were opened in Genova, located in via di Francia, for Ligurian information, Turin, in corso Unione Sovietica, and Alessandria, in via Piacenza, for Piedmontese columns and news.

In 1994, during the floods in Alessandria Province, Telecity broadcasts a series of reports created in the disaster areas by Dino Crocco, as a journalist, and intended for a service broadcast significantly titled Per non-dimenticare. Following this experience, the idea of creating Tre minuti con… came, a daily segment, inserted in the Alessandria edition of TG7, entrusted to Dino Crocco, who addresses everyday problems and acts as a spokesperson for ordinary people.

=== The creation of the 7 Gold circuit ===
Following the end of Italia 7, in 1999, Telecity's editor Giorgio Tacchino, with two other publishers (Giorgio Galante of Telepadova and Luigi Ferretti of Sestarete) he founded the syndication "Italia 7 Gold", which in 2003 was renamed "7 Gold". In the following years various private televisions joined the 7 Gold network, gradually spreading the signal to the rest of Italy. Telecity, the Venetian Telepadova and the Emilian Sestarete, to which is added the Tuscan TVR Teleitalia, become the main co-production TV channels on the circuit. The program schedule is made up of films, TV series, anime, sports and entertainment programmes. With the new millennium, the Assago operations center is expanded: it includes five television studios, four control rooms, all in digital technology, to start large sports productions such as Diretta Stadio, in-depth football analysis focused on Serie A matches on which, among others, sports journalists Giorgio Micheletti, Mauro Bellugi, Pietro Anastasi, Giovanni Lodetti, Xavier Jacobelli and Fabio Santini worked.

The 7 Gold programs alternated with slots reserved for programs of local interest managed freely by the individual broadcasters. Telecity broadcasts, as usual, news programs and information programs recorded in the studios of Turin, Alessandria and Castelletto d'Orba for Piedmont and Aosta Valley, in the studios of Genoa for Liguria and in those of Assago for Lombardy, although, to be able to contribute following the creation of the national broadcasts made in Assago, which became the company's registered office, the other offices lost part of their local "identity", having fewer productions under their belt. The administrative headquarters of the consortium, however, remains in Castelletto d'Orba, right where it all began and, where multiple musical varieties continue to see the light, conducted by the veteran Dino Crocco, broadcast on Telestar.

At Telecity, presenters Massimo Villa and Danilo Freri and journalists Riccardo Revello, Fulvio Collovati, Emilio Bianchi e Roberto Poletti worked, which is entrusted with the daily Lombard political column Aria Pulita Subsequently the program is adapted and relayed also in the other two regions of the group with the hosting assigned to journalists from the Turin editorial offices, where the director is Ivano Patitucci and the main hosts are Carla Ruffino and Roberto Monteriso, Alessandria, where the role of director falls to Ketti Porceddu and the best-known faces are Dede Vinci and Alessandra Dellacà, and Genova, which was led by Marco Benvenuto. In Lombardy, where the news service is directed by Gabriele Politi, Poletti is then replaced by Simona Arrigoni, assisted by Roberto Villani and Michele Avola.

=== Telecity on satellite ===
From December 2010, Telecity was also made available on satellite television, on vertical frequency 11541 of the Hotbird satellite, free to air and included in the list of channels of the official Tivùsat decoders and also on Sky Italia (on channel 838). On 25 January 2012, however, it abandoned its satellite frequency, being reduced to digital terrestrial television.

=== Digital conversion ===
In 2010, Telecity 7 Gold's programs and those of the other associated regional networks moved to digital Telecity 7 Gold continued carrying the programs of the 7 Gold circuit (Diretta Stadio, Il processo di Biscardi, Tg7 Sport and others) and also includes territorial service programs in its schedule: its own regional news (two daily editions in Piedmont and Liguria at 12.30 and 19.00, and one in Lombardy at 19.00) and a series of self-produced programs: Tg Salute, health program; Aria pulita mattina, press review and current affairs talks with guests in the studio, broadcast from Monday to Friday from 7.00 am under the guidance of Simona Arrigoni; Aria pulita, local insights scheduled at 12.00 (each branch offers its own version – in Piedmont, then moved to the new Telecity 1 channel) and the Piedmontese version of Musica insieme later renamed Musica in allegria (previously broadcast on Telecity 1) which, following the death of Dino Crocco, continues to be led by Romina, and at her side is the new host Maurizio Silvestri.

Other programs of the time included L'equilibrista, prime time talk-show that first aired in 2007 on Italia 8 (at the time "Milano+"), moved to the parent network in 2011; Filo diretto, daily strip lasting thirty minutes which gives voice to viewers who can intervene live to express everyday social and urban problems, broadcast at 12.00 in Piedmont and Liguria replacing Aria pulita (as for the column that preceded it, also for Filo direto each editorial team creates its own adaptation); Goal&Goal, weekly football news program centered on Genoa and Sampdoria, broadcast only in Liguria, presented by Marco Benvenuto.

=== Financial crisis ===
From 2012 to 2018 the television group remained involved in the crisis that overwhelmed many local stations: as consequence, at the beginning of 2017 the company announced seventy redundancies among journalists, technicians, operators and employees distributed across the five editorial offices. Following a restructuring process, the offices in Turin and Genoa were closed and the staff in Castelletto d'Orba, Milan and Alessandria were downsized. The latter editorial team, again coordinated by Ketti Porceddu, has been dealing with Tg7 and all information broadcasts covering the areas of Piedmont and Liguria since September 2017. Despite the reduction of the sites, the managers have expressed their intention to keep the information spaces for citizens alive in the programming and to have a new editorial project in the pipeline.
