= Maurizio Mosca =

Italian journalist (1940–2010)

- Born: Maurizio Mosca; 24 June 1940; Rome, Italy
- Died: 3 April 2010 (aged 69); Pavia, Italy
- Occupations: Sports journalist, TV presenter
- Height: 1.65 m (5 ft 5 in)

Maurizio Mosca (Rome, 24 June 1940 – Pavia, 3 April 2010) was an Italian sports journalist and TV presenter.

== Career ==
=== In print ===
Son of the humorist, journalist and writer Giovanni Mosca, and brother of Antonello, Benedetto and the writer Paolo Mosca, Maurizio Mosca began working for the newspaper La Notte in Milan before moving to the Gazzetta dello Sport, where he spent twenty years as editor in chief and where he also served as the interim director for two years. In 1983, the paper published an interview with Zico, who seldom granted interviews with Italian newspapers. Mosca declared that it had been made possible thanks to his close friendship with the footballer.

Later, during an appearance on Il Processo del Lunedì (The Monday Trial, most closely associated with its host, Aldo Biscardi), Mosca appeared with Zico. Biscardi asked Zico how he became a friend of Maurizio Mosca, to which the Brazilian responded: "I don't know this man". Mosca's career at Gazzetta dello Sport ended immediately. On being forced to leave the newspaper. Mosca claimed to be the victim of a "plot", and that he was considered "dangerous" by certain members of the national football system.

=== TV ===
Having commentated for Domenica Sportiva ('Sunday Sport') since 1969, Mosca began working regularly in television in 1979, making his debut as the host of a sports programme on a regional channel in Milan. He featured in many television and radio shows, almost always about football, both regionally and nationally.

After his ejection from the press, Mosca began to work in the growing market of private TV sports programming.

The end of the 1980s saw the increased influence of Silvio Berlusconi's Fininvest, and Mosca supported Cesare Cadeo on Calciomania, shown on Italia 1. During the show, in addition to expressing opinions, Mosca played the role of satirical opportunist, inspired by the latest news from the world of football. He made his entrance on stage dressed in an apron, brandishing tagliatelle around the time of the "Case Lipopill" (when the players Andrea Carnevale and Angelo Peruzzi had attributed their failed drugs tests to dietary suppressant medication).

During the years of the great A.C. Milan team coached by Arrigo Sacchi, lit up by the magic of the Dutch trio Marco van Basten, Ruud Gullit and Frank Rijkaard, Mosca became a supporter of the "game to zone" and "total football". He was sufficiently successful to guarantee himself a position as a regular guest and pundit on Guida al Campionato (Guide to the Championship), a Sunday show hosted by a young Sandro Piccinini. Mosca specialized in risky bets, such as "forecast by pendulum".

One of his programmes intended for a wider audience was L'Appello del Martedì (The appeal of the Tuesday), in which he would appear on stage dressed in magistrate's robes and headgear.

Later came other appearances, in programmes such as Controcampo, Zitti e Mosca, La Mosca al Naso and he had a section on Studio Sport called Ce l'ho con... (I blame...) through which he expressed, as can be understood by the eloquent title, his disappointment towards a particular character of the sports landscape.

In 2002 he conducted the TV show Senza Rete (Without Net), broadcast on Rete 4, along with Paolo Liguori, also participated in this broadcast Monica Vanali and Benedetta Massola. Maurizio Mosca is then passed to conduct a television football program popular in Lombardy broadcast on Antenna 3.

On 11 May 2005 Mosca was a guest on the program Carta Straccia, shown Antenna 3 and hosted by Roberto Poletti. The theme of the programme was a complaint by Consumers Association (CODACONS) against the wrestling shows on TV. During the broadcast, in that occasion, Mosca entertains the public, improvising an improbable match with wrestlers from a local federation and a transvestite.

Mosca played himself in Neri Parenti's movies Paparazzi (1998) and Tifosi (1999), and he wrote an autobiographical book titled La vita é rotonda... come un pallone da calcio (Life is round... like a football), published by Rizzoli in 2001.

=== Illness and death ===
Having been ill for a long time, Mosca died on the morning of 3 April 2010 at San Matteo Hospital in Pavia. Two days before his death, Sport Mediaset published his final article, regarding the dispute between José Mourinho and Mario Balotelli. In the article, Mosca discussed the reintegration of Mario Balotelli at Inter and improved relations between the two.

== Television and radio programs ==
=== National TV ===
- 1989–1998: Italia 1 (Guida al campionato, 1989), (Calciomania, 1989), (L'appello del Martedì, 1991)
- 1996–2001: TMC (Il processo di Biscardi)
- 2001–2002: La7 and Rai 2 (Il processo di Biscardi, Quelli che... il calcio)
- 2002–2003: Rete 4 e Italia 1 (Senza Rete, Controcampo)
- 2003–2010: Italia 1 (Controcampo, Guida al campionato)

=== Regional TV ===
- 1979–1981: Telemontepenice
- 1981–1989: Odeon TV Forza Italia (with Fabio Fazio, Walter Zenga, Roberta Termali)
- 1989–1992: Telereporter
- 1992–1993: Telelombardia (Qui studio a voi stadio)
- 1993–1999: Telenova (Novastadio, Supergol, L'edicola di Mosca, 91º minuto, Casa Mosca, Domenica in famiglia)
- 1999–2006: Antenna 3 (Antenna 13, Azzurro Italia, Casa Mosca, Sport daily, Calcio in faccia, Cartellino rosso)
- 2007–2010: Odeon TV (Il Campionato dei Campioni)

=== Radio ===
- 1993–1996: Radio Deejay (La Mosca in Ferrari) with Roberto Ferrari
- 2006–2009: Radio 105 Network (105's in Gazza and 105 Sport) with Fabiana e Fabio Caressa

== Filmography ==
- Paparazzi (1998)
- Tifosi (1999)

== Discography ==
- Superbomba feat. The Fly (2001)

== Bibliography ==
- La vita è rotonda... come un pallone da calcio (2001)
