= Tom Dooley (song) =

North Carolina folk song

Single by The Kingston Trio

from the album The Kingston Trio
- Written: Unknown, Frank Proffitt’s grandfather (possibly)
- Released: November 19, 1958
- Genre: Folk
- Label: Capitol
- Songwriters: Alan Lomax, Frank Warner
- Producer: Voyle Gilmore

Audio sample
- file; help

"Tom Dooley" (Roud 4192) is a traditional North Carolina folk song based on the 1866 murder of a woman named Laura Foster in Wilkes County, North Carolina by Tom Dula (whose name in the local dialect was pronounced "Dooley"). One of the more famous murder ballads, a popular hit version recorded in 1958 by The Kingston Trio reached No. 1 on the Billboard Hot 100 singles chart, was in the top 10 on the Billboard R&B chart, and appeared in the Cashbox Country Music Top 20.

The song was selected as one of the American Songs of the Century by the Recording Industry Association of America (RIAA), the National Endowment for the Arts, and Scholastic Inc. Members of the Western Writers of America chose it as one of the Top 100 Western songs of all time.

"Tom Dooley" fits within the wider genre of Appalachian murder ballads. A local poet named Thomas Land wrote a song about the tragedy, titled "Tom Dooley", shortly after Dula was hanged. In the documentary Appalachian Journey (1991), folklorist Alan Lomax describes Frank Proffitt as the "original source" for the song, which was misleading in that he did not write it. There are several earlier known recordings, notably one that G. B. Grayson and Henry Whitter made in 1929, approximately 10 years before Proffitt cut his own recording.

The Kingston Trio took their version from Frank Warner's singing. Warner had learned the song from Proffitt, who learned it from his aunt, Nancy Prather, whose parents had known both Laura Foster and Tom Dula. In a 1967 interview, Nick Reynolds of the Kingston Trio recounted first hearing the song from another performer and then being criticized and sued for taking credit for the song. Supported by the testimony of Anne and Frank Warner, Frank Proffitt was eventually acknowledged by the courts as the preserver of the original version of the song, and the Kingston Trio were ordered to pay royalties to him for their uncredited use of it.

== History ==
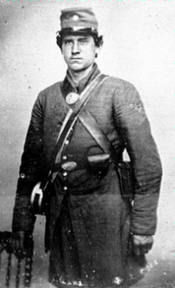
A man wearing a Confederate uniform

In 1866, Laura Foster was murdered. Confederate veteran Tom Dula, Foster's lover and the father of her unborn child, was convicted of her murder and hanged May 1, 1868. Foster had been stabbed to death with a large knife, and the brutality of the attack partly accounted for the widespread publicity the murder and subsequent trial received.

Anne Foster Melton, Laura's cousin, had been Dula's lover from the time he was twelve and until he left for the Civil War – even after Anne married an older man named James Melton. When Dula returned, he became a lover again to Anne, then Laura, then their cousin Pauline Foster. Pauline's comments led to the discovery of Laura's body and accusations against both Tom and Anne. Anne was subsequently acquitted in a separate trial, based on Dula's word that she had nothing to do with the killing. Dula's enigmatic statement on the gallows that he had not harmed Foster but still deserved his punishment led to press speculation that Melton was the actual killer and that Dula simply covered for her. (Melton, who had once expressed jealousy of Dula's purported plans to marry Foster, died either in a carting accident or by going insane a few years after the homicide, depending on the version.)

Thanks to the efforts of newspapers such as The New York Times and to the fact that former North Carolina governor Zebulon Vance represented Dula pro bono, Dula's murder trial and hanging were given widespread national publicity. A local poet, Thomas C. Land, wrote a song titled "Tom Dooley" about Dula's tragedy soon after the hanging. Combined with the widespread publicity the trial received, Land's song further cemented Dula's place in North Carolina legend.

A man named "Grayson", mentioned in the song as pivotal in Dula's downfall, has sometimes been characterized as a romantic rival of Dula's or a vengeful sheriff who captured him and presided over his hanging. Some variant lyrics of the song portray Grayson in that light, and the spoken introduction to the Kingston Trio version did the same. Col. James Grayson was actually a Tennessee politician who had hired Dula on his farm when the young man fled North Carolina under suspicion and was using a false name. Grayson did help North Carolinians capture Dula and was involved in returning him to North Carolina but otherwise played no role in the case.

Dula was tried in Statesville, North Carolina as it was believed he could not get a fair trial in Wilkes County. He was given a new trial on appeal but he was again convicted and hanged on May 1, 1868. On the gallows, Dula reportedly stated, "Gentlemen, do you see this hand? I didn't harm a hair on the girl's head."

Dula's last name was pronounced "Dooley", leading to some confusion in spelling over the years. The pronunciation of a final "a" like "y" (or "ee") is an old feature in Appalachian speech, as in the term "Grand Ole Opry". The confusion was compounded by the fact that Dr. Tom Dooley, an American physician known for international humanitarian work, was at the height of his fame in 1958 when the Kingston Trio version became a major hit.

== Recordings ==
Many renditions of the song have been recorded, most notably:

- In 1929, G. B. Grayson and Henry Whitter made the first recorded version of Land's song by a group well known at the time, for Victor.
- Frank Warner, Elektra, 1952. Warner, a folklorist, unaware of the 1929 recording, in 1940 took down the song from Frank Proffitt and passed it to Alan Lomax who published it in Folk Song: USA.
- On March 30, 1953, the CBS radio series Suspense broadcast a half-hour "Tom Dooley" drama loosely based on the song, which was sung during the program by actor Harry Dean Stanton. While not issued as a commercial recording, transcription discs of the broadcast eventually were digitized and circulated by old time radio collectors.
- The Folksay Trio, which featured Erik Darling, Bob Carey and Roger Sprung, issued the first post-1950 version of the song for American Folksay-Ballads and Dances, Vol. 2 on the Stinson label in 1953. Their version was noteworthy for including a pause in the line "Hang down your head Tom...Dooley". The group reformed in 1956 as The Tarriers, featuring Darling, Carey and Alan Arkin, and released another version of "Tom Dooley" for The Tarriers on the Glory label in 1957.
- The Kingston Trio recorded the most popular version of the song in 1958 for Capitol. This recording sold in excess of six million copies, topping the U.S. Billboard Hot 100 chart, and is often credited with starting the "folk music boom" of the late 1950s and 1960s. It only had three verses (and the chorus four times). This recording of the song was inducted into the National Recording Registry of the Library of Congress and honored with a Grammy Hall of Fame Award. The Grammy Foundation named it one of the Songs of the Century.
- Neil Young and Crazy Horse recorded an eight-minute version on their 2012 album Americana, on which they retitled the song to the proper spelling "Tom Dula".
- The French group Les Compagnons de la Chanson recorded a French version titled "Tom Dooley (Fais ta priere)", which reached No. 1 on the Belgian chart and No. 4 on the French chart in 1959.

Other artists who have recorded versions of the song include Paul Clayton, Line Renaud, Bing Crosby, Jack Narz, Steve Earle the Grateful Dead, Arthur "Guitar Boogie" Smith, and Doc Watson. Lonnie Donegan also recorded the song in the UK. It spent 14 weeks in the British charts from November 1958, reaching its highest ranking at number 3 for 5 weeks.

== References in other songs ==
- The third and final verse of country music singer Stonewall Jackson's 1958 crossover hit "Waterloo" referenced Tom Dooley with the lyrics, "Now he swings where the little birdie sings, and that's where Tom Dooley met his Waterloo."
- Ella Fitzgerald includes an altered line from the song in a recording of "Rudolph the Red-Nosed Reindeer" on her 1967 album, Ella Wishes You a Swinging Christmas.

=== Parodies ===
"Tom Dooley" prompted a number of parodies, either as part of other songs or as entire songs. For example:

- The Smothers Brothers did a version of the song on their 1961 debut album, The Smothers Brothers at the Purple Onion, which referenced the lawsuit against The Kingston Trio by claiming that Dickie Smothers had written it and The Kingston Trio had stolen it.
- The Four Preps used this song and "Worried Man Blues" to make fun of The Kingston Trio in their song "More Money For You and Me".
- The Incredible Bongo Band recorded the song "Hang Down Your Head Tom Dooley, Your Tie's Caught In Your Zipper" (1972).
- The Capitol Steps used this song to make fun of South Dakota Senator Tom Daschle on their 2003 album Between Iraq and a Hard Place.

== Charts ==
Weekly chart performance for "Tom Dooley"
Chart (1958–1959)	Peak position
Belgium (Ultratop 50 Flanders)	1
Belgium (Ultratop 50 Wallonia)	1
Canada (CHUM)	1
Italy (FIMI)	1
Netherlands (Single Top 100) Then called the Muziek Parade chart.	1
Norway (VG-lista)	1
UK Singles (Official Charts)	5
US Billboard Hot 100	1
US Hot R&B/Hip-Hop Songs (Billboard) Then called the Hot R&B Singles chart.	9

== Certifications ==
Certifications for "Tom Dooley"
Region	Certification	Certified units/sales
United States (RIAA)	Gold	1,000,000^{^}
^{^} Shipments figures based on certification alone.

== In popular culture ==
- The Kingston Trio's hit song was the inspiration for the 1959 film The Legend of Tom Dooley, starring Michael Landon as Dooley, and co-starring Richard Rust. A Western set in the immediate aftermath of the Civil War, it was not about traditional Tom Dula legends or the facts of the case, but a fictional treatment tailored to fit the lyrics of the song.
- "Tom Dooley" is the name of a season 5 episode of Ally McBeal, in which John Cage sings a version of the song with his Mexican band.
- The song was parodied in episode No. 702 of Mystery Science Theater 3000. Crow T. Robot, motivated by one actor's resemblance to Thomas Dewey, sang a version beginning "Hang down your head, Tom Dewey."
- Glada Barn's version of Land's song closes Rectify season 2 episode "Mazel Tov".
- In the 1980 film Friday the 13th, the campers in the opening scene start to sing the song. The opening scene is set in 1958, the year the Kingston Trio version of the song debuted.
- Episode 10 of Santo, Sam and Ed's Total Football Podcast is titled "Hang Down Your Head Tom Dula". This naming was in reference to a sample of the song generated by Santo Cilauro whereby he jokingly claimed Tiziano Crudeli had performed a version of Tom Dooley with "The Kingstown Trio". Crudeli's bombastic commentary style on Diretta Stadio afforded him celebrity status in Italy, and audio of Crudeli's pronunciation of various footballers' names was a constant running gag throughout the Total Football Podcast.
- Irish comedian Dave Allen did a sketch in which two cowboys with guitars sit by a hangman's gallows, trying to compose a ballad. They try to think of a name to incorporate into their song, but have no success. Then Tom Dooley walks past, and they sing, "Hand down your head, Tom Dooley" and think that sounds great, so they hang him.

== Song books ==
- Blood, Peter; Patterson, Annie (1992). Rise Up Singing. Amherst, Ma: Sing Out Publications. p. 104. ISBN 978-1-881322-13-9.
- Lomax, Alan; John A., Lomax (1947). Folk Song U.S.A.. Best Loved American Folk Songs (1 ed.). New York: Duell, Sloan and Pearce.

== See also ==
- List of Hot 100 number-one singles of 1958 (U.S.)
- List of number-one singles in Australia during the 1950s
