= Italia 7 =

1987–1998 Italian television channel

- Country: Italy
- Broadcast area: Italy; San Marino; Ticino (Switzerland)

Programming
- Language: Italian
- Picture format: 4:3 SDTV

Ownership
- Owner: Telecity and TVR Voxson

History
- Launched: 4 October 1987; 38 years ago
- Replaced: Euro TV (some stations)
- Closed: 17 April 1998; 28 years ago

Italia 7 was an Italian private television circuit active from 4 October 1987 to 17 April 1998.

Partial inheritor of the Euro TV syndication network, it saw its period of greater popularity between 1987 and 1994, a period where it was managed by the Fininvest group. The channel's flagship program was Colpo Grosso.

== History ==
=== Birth and Fininvest management (1987-1994) ===
Italia 7 launched on 4 October 1987 on stations that left Euro TV and did not join the new Odeon TV circuit (renamed Odeon 24 in 2014). At the beginning, the circuit was managed by Fininveset, which had favored its birth to counter the rise of Odeon TV and which ensured it, in addition to advertising revenue, the production of television programs and the possibility of drawing on its own content warehouse. Its president was Luca Montrone.

Its programming, co-ordinated to the three Fininvest networks, consisted of lots of movies and TV series in premiere showings, such as the final seasons of Falcon Crest, first-run soap operas and telenovelas (Ryan's Hope, Days of Our Lives, Amándote), sporting events during the weekly progcomram Italia 7 Sport and, above all, the famous sexy-quiz Colpo Grosso (Big Strike), presented by Umberto Smaila, airing in a late prime time slot. There was also a rich children's schedule, ppresenteed mainly during two strands: Super 7 (a sort of Bim bum bam set in a spaceship and resented by Carlo Sacchetti, with puppet Frittella and robot Mic Mac, with the voice of Paola Tovaglia; shown from 1988 to 1991) and Sette in allegria (shown from 1991 to 1994). Among the many cartoons and anime broadcast, most titles catered to a male audience, such as Ronin Warriors, F, Dash! Yonkuro, Miracle Giants Dome-kun, Teenage Mutant Ninja Turtles, Saint Seiya, Robotech, BraveStarr and Fist of the North Star, several of which in first-run in Italy. In 1993 and 1994, several American and French series aimed at a younger audience were added.

In those years, many rumors circulated about Silvio Berlusconi's intention to completely acquire the circuit, as he had already done with Italia 1 and Rete 4, making it the fourth Fininvest channel. In particular, if Canale 5 was positioned as the family network (like Rai 1), Italia 1 for the youth and Rete 4 for female audiences, Italia 7 would aim at the male market, in order to complete an offer for each core audience. However, the appropriation of the Mammì law in 1990, which fixed the number of national networks for each private radio and television operator to be at three, forced Fininvest to renounce the project and proceeded to the cession of the circuit to another company; at the time, its rival Odeon TV was no longer seen as a "threat", after the bankruptcy of the two managements in 1991 and in 1994.

=== The D.A.P.S. management (1994-1996) ===
After the Fininvest phase, in March 1994, Italia 7 was handed over to D.A.P.S., a company directed by publisher Giampiero Ades, who at the same time launched the Amica 8 and Amica 9: through Mauro Scaffardi's WBSD, D.A.P.S. signed agreements with Warner Bros. to grant exclusive rights in Italy, for five years, of the US major's film and television archives, first-run and repeats. Talk shows, columns and variety shows hosted by personalities from the showbiz world were added, but they followed already established patterns: for example, the late prime slot was occupied by the sexy game Notte italiana (Italian Night) presented by Ric, Carmen Russo and Augusto Martelli, a clone of Colpo Grosso, or the quiz show Ma quanto mi ami? (But How Much Do You Love Me?), a new version of the historical M'ama non m'ama, again presented by Marco Predolin and Ramona Dell'Abate. However the scarce viewing ratings the network reported caused Warner Bros. to rescind from its contract already stipulated in January 1995, after the sole airing of a premiere episode of Lois & Clark: The New Adventures of Superman, which was later picked up by Rai 3, and a handful of minor film titles. Without the agreement with the American major, D.A.P.S. found itself without sufficient means to manage national television syndication and went bankrupt shortly after, in 1996.

Among the other programs broadcast during this second management there were also the USA Today container, previously broadcast on the rival Odeon TV, hosted by Giorgio Mastrota and Stefano Gallarini, the extreme sport of Action, presented by Guido Bagatta, also previously a face of the competing circuit, the sitcom Punta alle 8, with Paolo Calissano, directed by Giancarlo Nicotra, the comedy variety show Le cose buone della vita, with Andrea Roncato and Gigi Sammarchi.

=== The Telecity/TVR Voxson management (1996-1998) and the division in Europa 7 and 7 Gold ===
After the bankruptcy of D.A.P.S, Italia 7 was now under the hands of Giorgio Tacchino and Francesco Di Stefano, already, respectively, owners of two affiliates of the circuit, Milan's Telecity and Rome's TVR Voxson, both head stations of the syndication. Among the programs produced in this period, there was the comedy variety show Seven Show, presented by then-rookies Alessandro Greco and Teo Mammucari, and the weekly female program Fantastica, presented by Patrizia Rossetti.

In 1998, given that ownership of the Italia 7 brand was uncertain and split between several local broadcasters (see next section), Di Stefano decided to change the name of the circuit: thus on 18 April 1998, Italia 7 changed its name to Europa 7, after a transitional period in which both logos continued to appear on screen. Telecity, as well as two of its affiliate, Veneto's Tele Padova and Emilia Romagna's Sesta Rete, continued to provisionally relay Europa 7 with the logo of Italia 7 and planned an exit from the network, which was achieved the following year with the creation of the new syndication network Italia 7 Gold. This last one, after a few tests that started on 31 May 1999, started official broadcasts using its own logo on 1 January 2000; in the early days it had limited coverage to northern Italy, but then it gradually spread throughout the national territory and from 14 April 2003 it was renamed 7 Gold. Europa 7, however, after having been the protagonist of various political-judicial vicissitudes that lasted for over a decade, announced its evolution in the sense of a pay TV service of a national character, named Europa7 HD: it began broadcasting on an experimental basis on 28 July 2010 and definitively on the following 11 October; the previous syndication activity, however, no longer covered the entire peninsula, remaining visible until the second half of the 2000s mostly in the central-southern regions.

=== The local Italia 7 stations ===
From 1990, the "Italia 7" brand was registered on its own behalf by several of its affiliates and some of these kept the logo on air even after the cessation of the circuit. In addition to the temporary case of Telecity that has already mentioned, there was also Italia 7 Toscana (previously known as Tele 37) which relayed the syndication programs for Tuscany and Umbria, maintaining the same name and logo even after its exit from the national circuit, which occurred in 1996; it was subsequently affiliated, starting from 2003, to the new 7 Gold circuit, until 2008, the year in which it also broke away from this, returning to having totally autonomous and independent programming. The Sicilian broadcaster Telecolor also continued to call itself "Telecolor Italia 7" and used the old circuit logo for its independent broadcasts until 2009. The Abruzzo station TVQ (which relayed the circuit's programs for Abruzzo and Molise), remained affiliated with Europa 7, also maintaining the Italia 7 brand on screen with the subtitle "TVQ", until around 2004 it separated from Di Stefano's circuit and the logo was entirely redesigned.

In July 2018, the television company that owns Italia 7 Toscana, Il Gelsomino Srl, declared bankruptcy. The bankruptcy auction, which took place on 31 July of the same year, decreed the purchase of the television company by the Gold TV group, already owner since 2014 of Odeon 24, former rival of the national Italia 7 in the eighties and nineties. The station still remains present in Tuscany, Umbria, Lazio and Liguria (in the latter two regions, however, the signal is limited respectively only to the provinces of Viterbo and La Spezia) with a renewed Italia 7 logo.
