= Massimo Brambati =

Italian footballer

Personal information
- Full name: Massimo Brambati
- Date of birth: 29 June 1966 (age 60)
- Place of birth: Milan, Italy
- Height: 1.80 m (5 ft 11 in)
- Position: Defender

Senior career*
| Years | Team | Apps | (Gls) |
| 1985–1989 | Torino | 21 | (0) |
| 1986–1988 | → Empoli (loan) | 47 | (0) |
| 1989–1993 | Bari | 98 | (0) |
| 1993–1994 | Lucchese | 32 | (0) |
| 1994–1995 | Palermo | 30 | (0) |
| 1995–1997 | Lucchese | 28 | (1) |
| 1997–1998 | Ternana | 4 | (0) |
| 1998–1999 | Saronno | 19 | (0) |
| Total | | 279 | (1) |

International career^{‡}
| 1987–1988 | Italy under-21s | 9 | (0) |
| 1988 | Italy under-23s | 4 | (0) |
- * Club domestic league appearances and goals as of 12:49, 17 July 2010 (UTC) ‡ National team caps and goals as of 12:49, 17 July 2010 (UTC)

Massimo Brambati (born 29 June 1966) is an Italian former footballer who played as a defender.

== Club career ==
Brambati began his career at Torino, but he first established himself as a first-team footballer during a two-season loan spell at Empoli. He moved to Bari, whom he went on to captain, in 1989, winning the Mitropa Cup with the Italian club in 1990. He spent four seasons at the club before finishing his career with spells at Lucchese, Palermo, Ternana and Saronno.

== International career ==
After representing the Italy under-21 side at the 1988 Under-21 European Championships, Brambati was also a member of the Italy under-23 olympic squad that reached the semi-finals of the 1988 Summer Olympics in Seoul, under Cesare Maldini, eventually finishing in fourth place.

== After retirement ==
Following his retirement in 1999, Brambati has regularly appeared on the football show Diretta Stadio on 7 Gold.

== Personal ==
Brambati was married to the Romanian model Catrinel Menghia.

== Honours ==
Bari

- Mitropa Cup: 1990
