= Super Six =

Super Six or Super 6 may refer to:

- Super Six (film), a Sri Lankan film
- Super Six, a group of fictional characters in the 2006 Indian sci-fi film Koi Mil Gaya
- Super Six World Boxing Classic, a super middleweight tournament starting in 2009
- Six-red snooker, a snooker variant also known as Super 6s
- Super 6 Rugby, an Australasian rugby union tournament played in 1993; predecessor of Super 10 and Super Rugby
- Super 6 (rugby union), a semi-professional competition for Scottish rugby union clubs
- Super 6, a stage of the Cricket World Cup in 1999 and 2003
- The Super 6, an animated cartoon series from 1966
- Hudson Super Six, an American car first produced in 1916
- Super Six corrugated roof sheeting and fencing
- A series of road bicycle models made by Cannondale Bicycle Corporation
- Soccer Saturday Super 6, a free-to-enter online prediction game offered by Sky Betting & Gaming
- Essex Super Six, a brand of automobile produced between 1918 and 1922
- Super Six (TV channel), an Italian television channel
- The DC-6B variant of the Douglas DC-6 airliner aircraft (designated as such by operator Pan Am)
