= Il processo di Biscardi =

- Starring: Aldo Biscardi, Georgia Viero
- Country of origin: Italy

Production
- Running time: 3/4 hours

Original release
- Release: 1993

Il Processo di Biscardi is a sports talk and debate television program produced by Frenter Communication and aired on various affiliated local television channels in Italy, entirely devoted to Italian Soccer, in particular the Serie A.

== Former television ==
- TELE+
- La7 (1996-2006)
- 7 Gold (2006-2013, 2017-2023)
- T9 (2013)
- Netweek (2024-present)

== Commentators and Presenters ==
=== Current commentators and presenters ===
- Aldo Biscardi
- Georgia Viero
- Giorgio Martino
- Maurizio Biscardi

=== Former commentators ===
- Tiziano Crudeli
- Elio Corno
- Marica Longini
- Antonio Paolino
- Federico Bertone
- Daniele Capezzone
- Fabio Ravezzani
- Maurizio Mosca
- Helenio Herrera
- Giampiero Mughini

== Involvement in Calciopoli ==
In May 2006, extracts from intercepted telephone conversations between Biscardi and Luciano Moggi were revealed. In the climate of the scandal which became known as Calciopoli, it was revealed that the Juventus official had instructed Biscardi on what to say or not say during his television transmission. Biscardi therefore joined the list of those under investigation (July 2007) although he was later archived with a penal profile. In the meantime, Biscardi left La7 (May 2006) and took his programme with him to a new channel, 7 Gold. At the same time, in September 2006, the Italian Order of Journalists imposed a 6-month suspension due to the scandal which led to an open and heated confrontation with the Order.
