= Frank Warner (folklorist) =

American folklorist and musician (1903–1978)

- Born: Francis Moreland Warner; April 5, 1903; Selma, Alabama, United States
- Died: February 27, 1978 (aged 74) Long Island, New York, United States
- Genres: Traditional folk music
- Occupations: Folklorist, song collector, singer
- Instruments: Banjo, ukulele, guitar
- Years active: 1924-1975
- Labels: Disc, Elektra, Heirloom, Prestige Int., Minstrel

Francis Moreland Warner (April 5, 1903 – February 27, 1978) was an American folk song collector, singer, musician, and YMCA executive. He and his wife Anne Warner (born Elizabeth Anne Locher, October 18, 1905 – April 26, 1991) collected and preserved many previously unpublished traditional song versions from the eastern United States, including "Tom Dooley", "He's Got the Whole World in His Hands", "The Days of Forty-Nine", and "Gilgarrah Mountain", a New Hampshire version of the song more widely known as "Whiskey in the Jar".

== Early life ==
Frank Warner was born in Selma, Alabama, United States, and grew up in Jackson, Tennessee and Durham, North Carolina. He attended Duke University, and was president of the university's Glee Club. As a student of pioneer song collector Professor Frank C. Brown, he developed his interest in traditional folk music, and made his public singing debut to accompany a lecture by Brown at the North Carolina State Fair in Raleigh in 1924. He graduated in 1925 and continued his studies at the School of Social Work at Columbia University in New York City before deciding to work for the Young Men's Christian Association and joining the YMCA training school. He continued to perform occasionally, singing and playing guitar and banjo, and began spending vacations collecting folk songs. He started work at the YMCA in Greensboro, North Carolina, in 1928, before moving to work in New York City in 1931.

== Marriage and song collecting ==
He married Missouri-born Anne Locher in New York in 1935. She had studied literature at Northwestern University before working as a secretary in New York. The couple lived in Greenwich Village, in a literary community among friends including Stephen Vincent Benét, Carl Carmer, Marianne Moore, Clifton Fadiman, and DuBose Heyward. They continued to spend their vacations traveling in rural parts of the eastern United States, including the Adirondacks, the Appalachians and New England, as well as in eastern Canada, to obtain folk material. Most of their material was collected in upstate New York and in North Carolina.

Between 1938 and 1969 Anne and Frank Warner recorded over one thousand traditional songs and stories. On their travels they met and recorded singers including Yankee John Galusha, Frank Proffitt, Lena Bourne Fish, Lee Monroe Presnell, and Sue Thomas. In 1938, they met traditional Appalachian dulcimer maker Nathan Hicks and his son-in-law Frank Proffitt in Beech Mountain, North Carolina, and recorded Proffitt's performance of the song "Tom Dooley". Using a wooden banjo made for him by Hicks, Warner later began performing the song, which became an international hit in the 1950s in recordings by both The Kingston Trio and Lonnie Donegan. The Warners collected "He's Got the Whole World in His Hands" from Sue Thomas at Nags Head, North Carolina.

As non-professional collectors, they had no outside financial help, and often recorded only short extracts of songs, with Anne Warner transcribing the remainder manually using shorthand. She later said:

"We had a recording machine by this time [1939] and small discs. This was long before tape, and because our supply of discs was short, we would record two stanzas of a song - to get the melody - and stop the machine. The fortunate aspect was that I got them all down correctly then and there. From then on, we spent our month's vacation, which we each had each year from our regular jobs, working as hard as we did any other time - usually spending two weeks in the South and two weeks in the North..".

According to Alan Lomax, writing in the 1990s: "For many years the Warners spent every vacation and every scrap of spare cash on their recording trips. It was a continuous act of unpaid, tender devotion to American folk song and a life-long love affair with the people who remembered the ballads...".

Beside his unpaid work in collecting folk songs, Frank Warner continued in his employment by the YMCA, becoming a member of its national council, and from 1952 until his retirement was general secretary for operations in Nassau and Suffolk counties, Long Island.

== Performances and recordings ==
Frank Warner recorded several albums of the material the couple collected. The first was a set of three 78s, Hudson Valley Songs, for the Disc Company of America in 1946, where he was accompanied by Bess Lomax, Butch Hawes, Pete Seeger and Tom Glazer. In 1951, he issued another 78, containing "Got the Whole World in His Hand", which - together with his own version of "Tom Dooley" - was among the songs he included on his first 10" LP, American Folk Songs and Ballads, released by Elektra Records in 1952. He recorded two more albums for Elektra, Songs and Ballads of America's Wars (1954), and Our Singing Heritage, Vol.III (1958; later reissued as American Traditional Folk Songs). In 1961, he recorded Songs of the Civil War: North and South, for the Prestige International label. Anne Warner wrote the liner notes for his albums.

Frank Warner also appeared regularly on radio and TV, and gave hundreds of lectures and public appearances before educational, civic and community audiences. His banjo playing and singing was featured in the 1957 movie Run of the Arrow starring Rod Steiger. He authored Folk Songs and Ballads of the Eastern Seaboard: From a Collectors Notebook, published in 1963, and became a member of the board of the Newport Folk Festival, vice president of the Country Dance and Song Society of America, and president of the New York State Folklore Society. The couple also published essays on traditional American folk culture and music, in a variety of journals.

From the 1950s, Frank Warner performed in concert halls - including Carnegie Hall - and in colleges and at folk festivals across the US, including the First Annual Newport Folk Festival in 1959, and the 1961 festival. He was often joined onstage by Anne and by their sons Jeff and Gerret Warner, who accompanied them on guitar, concertina, jew's harp, and spoons. Both sons later performed and recorded on their own. An informal concert by Frank Warner and his sons in 1973, at the Cider Press in Dartington, Devon, England, was recorded, and was later released by Folktrax as Listen To America Sing: Frank Warner & Family in Concert.

Frank Warner's last album, Come All You Good People, with accompaniment by his sons and liner notes by Anne Warner, was released by Minstrel Records in 1975.

== Death ==
Frank Warner died at his home on Long Island in 1978, at the age of 74.

== Archiving and legacy ==
The Warners donated their collection of recordings, photographs and other documentation to the Library of Congress American Folklife Center, in 1950 and 1972. Additional recordings, moving image, and written material, including correspondence, is held in the David M. Rubenstein Rare Book & Manuscript Library at Duke University.

After her husband's death, Anne Warner spent several years archiving and compiling their recordings, publishing a book, Traditional American Folk Songs from the Anne and Frank Warner Collection in 1984. She also wrote liner notes for compilations of Frank Proffitt's recordings. Anne Warner died in 1991 at the age of 85.

Collections of the Warners' field recordings, co-produced by Jeff and Gerret Warner, were released by Appleseed Recordings in 2000 as Music From the Anne & Frank Warner Collection, Vol. 1: Her Bright Smile Haunts Me Still and ..Vol. 2: Nothing Seems Better to Me: The Music of Frank Proffitt and North Carolina. Jeff and Gerret Warner also produced From the Mountains to the Sea, a two-hour, multimedia presentation on the lives of Anne and Frank Warner and their collecting activities.

== Discography ==
- Hudson Valley Songs (3x78 album, Disc, 1946)
- American Folk Songs and Ballads (10-inch LP, Elektra, 1952)
- Songs and Ballads of America's Wars (10-inch LP, Elektra, 1954)
- Our Singing Heritage, Vol.III (Elektra, 1958)
- Songs of the Civil War: North and South (Prestige International, 1961)
- Come All You Good People (Minstrel, 1976)
