= Paolo Mosca =

Italian journalist, writer, singer and television presenter

- Born: 20 October 1943; Pallanza, Italy
- Died: 30 November 2014 (aged 71); Rome, Italy
- Occupations: journalist, writer, singer

Paolo Mosca (20 October 1943 – 30 November 2014) was an Italian journalist, writer, singer and television presenter.

Born in Pallanza, Mosca graduated in political science, and he attended the drama school of the Piccolo Teatro in Milan. He later started a career as a singer, and in 1964 he won the "B" section of Cantagiro with the song "La voglia dell'estate".

In later years he dedicated himself to writing and journalism, and was director of magazines and newspapers, notably La Domenica del Corriere.

Mosca was also a playwright, and a television author and host, better known for the RAI late night show Il cappello sulle ventitré. He was the brother of the sport journalist Maurizio Mosca.
