= Telenova (Italian TV channel) =

- Country: Italy
- Broadcast area: much of Lombardy and Piedmont

Programming
- Language: Italian
- Picture format: 16:9 HDTV

Ownership
- Owner: Multimedia San Paolo

History
- Launched: 1976

Links
- Website: http://www.telenova.it/

Availability

Terrestrial
- DTT in Lombardy and Piedmont: LCN 18

Telenova is an Italian television station founded in 1976, based in Milan with regional coverage. The station is of Catholic inspiration, owned by Gruppo Editoriale San Paolo: it is affiliated to the Corallo Sat Catholic circuit, for which it relays some programs.

== History ==
In 1976, it was created by initiative of Famiglia Cristiana, alongside NovaRadio. The station was owned by the Pauline publishers, and, under the name of NOVECO TV, relayed TSI's programming. In 1977, NOVECO TV broadcast on UHF channel 51 in Milan. Joining TSI's relays, local programming emerged, with the press review program Prima Pagina and news bulletin Milano 24 Ore. In April 1978, the station adopted the Telenova name. It added a second relay station on channel 21.

The station initially broadcast in black and white. It contested the illegal television stations that operated across the country that challenged RAI's monopoly. The first director was Giuliano Coacci. Among the first programs were Telenova Notizie presented by Fabio Benati, Massimo Ferrari, Paolo Pardini and Paola Blandi. In 1980, the Milan-Inter program began airing hosted by Enrico Crespi. Other programs included Basket Time with Tullio Lauro and Mike D'Antoni, Ma daiamo i numeri?, and football programs (Milan-Inter and Zona Goal) launched by Marco Civoli and Paola Ferrari. The Telenova cooking expert who read recipes for the viewers was the mother of Irene and Veronica Pivetti, Paolo Pivetti (father of Irene and Veronica) who also worked at TeleNova, hosting the morning press review.

In 1982, the station joined the Euro TV circuit and briefly adopted the T59 brand. When Euro TV went bankrupt in 1985, the station became autonomous and strengthened its signal. In 1988, it joined the Cinquestelle circuit, leaving in 1995.

In the aftermath of the 1992 Mammì law, the government granted licenses to private operators and the station was obliged to begin its news service, coinciding with its new facilities and an increase in local productions. In 1998, Giacomo De Antonellis was appointed director and started relaying programs from Catholic channel Sat2000. In 2005, it started satellite broadcasting nationwide.

Unlike other stations, the station does not air overnight fortune telling or adult content given its Catholic editorial line.

By 2012, Telenova was one of many local television stations facing a financial crisis.

In 2023, the station improved its technological infrastructure.
