= Cesare Cadeo =

Italian television presenter and journalist (1946–2019)

- Born: 2 July 1946; Milan, Lombardy, Italy
- Died: 4 April 2019 (aged 72); Milan
- Occupation: Journalist

Cesare Cadeo (2 July 1946 – 4 April 2019) was an Italian television presenter and journalist.

== Career ==
He began working at Canale 5 in 1981, as a correspondent and business consultant, appearing in the following year in Gol, a football program led by Enzo Bearzot, and Superflash, alongside Mike Bongiorno. In 1983 he led Five Album with Sandra Mondaini, a summary of the 1982–1983 Canale 5 television season. At that time he was also a pundit on many programs and sporting events. He worked as a correspondent for the Buongiorno Italia program.

His television career was particularly linked to the Mediaset networks. He was called the "gentleman of the small screen", and described as an emblem of television in the 1980s.

In 1984 he debuted as a presenter in Record, Super Record and Super Record Sport, on Canale 5, continuing to collaborate in the programs of Mike Bongiorno Superflash and Pentathlon. His experience as a sports journalist continued in the programs Un anno di sport and Cadillac and in the sports sections for Buongiorno Italia and Studio 5. In 1988 he hosted Fantasia on Canale 5, a quiz show with children in the spotlight. From 1989 to 1992 he hosted the Italia 1 late-night show Calciomania, alongside Paola Perego and Maurizio Mosca.

From 1994 he presented on Rete 4 Buona giornata with Patrizia Rossetti, as well as numerous infomercials and home shopping segments. In 1995 he was a regular guest on the Italia 1 Gialappa's Band's program Mai dire Gol, acting as a correspondent from a fake newsstand. In 2001 he presented the cooking show Mezzogiorno di cuoco, with Lorenzo Battistello; in the same period he collaborated with the editorial staff of TG5.

In the spring of 2007 he hosted the Rai 2 reality show La sposa perfetta with Roberta Lanfranchi, and he also presented a special episode of Furore on its tenth anniversary.

Among his last appearances, in 2008 Cadeo was a guest in the Miss Muretto beauty contest, and he appeared in the fifth season of Pechino Express with Patrizia Rossetti in an "infomercial" that the competitors had to replicate.

He died on 4 April 2019 after a long illness.
