= Novastadio =

- Starring: Gianni Visnadi, Luciano Rindone, Michele Marchetti
- Country of origin: Italy

Novastadio is a sports talk and debate television program produced by Telenova and aired on various affiliated local television channels in Italy. The program is entirely devoted to Italian soccer, in particular the Serie A.

== Commentators and Presenters ==
=== Actual commentators and presenters ===
- Gianni Visnadi
- Michele Marchetti
- Luciano Rindone
- Domenico Marocchino
- Enzo Gambaro
- Luigi Balestra
- Bruno Pizzul
- Alessio Grosso
- Emiliano Mondonico
- Bobo Gori
- Luca Serafini
- Piero Frosio
- Carlo Coppola
- Luisito Suárez
- Sandro Mazzola
- Luca Serafini
