= Aldo Biscardi =

Italian journalist and television presenter (1930–2017)

- Born: Aldo Biscardi; 26 November 1930; Larino, Kingdom of Italy
- Died: 8 October 2017 (aged 86); Rome, Italy
- Occupation: sports journalist
- Years active: 1950–2016
- Height: 1.75 m (5 ft 9 in)

Aldo Biscardi (26 November 1930 – 8 October 2017) was an Italian football broadcaster, best known for presenting the show Il processo di Biscardi (The Biscardi Trial).

== Biography ==
Native of Larino, province of Campobasso, he graduated in Law from the University of Naples. In 1952 he began working on the daily Neapolitan newspaper, Il Mattino. In 1956 he became the sports editor of the Rome sports paper Paese Sera, of which he would later become editor-in-chief.

In 1979 he began his television career, taking charge of Raitre sporting broadcasts and in 1980 was presenting programmes on a range of channels, gaining popularity for his down-to-earth style of chatting and for his linguistic gaffes and puns.

In 1980, Biscardi launched his RaiTre creation, Il Processo del Lunedì. In the first series, Enrico Ameri presented the show followed by Marino Bartoletti, with Biscardi taking the backseat role of editor.

In 1993, Biscardi moved to Tele+ and took on the range of sports offered by that channel, re-introducing the Il Processo di Biscardi programme with the same formula and name, followed, in 1996, by another move to Telemontecarlo. His flagship programme would continue on the channel before it became, from 2001, La7.

In 2005, with the creation of the digital terrestrial channel La7, Biscardi became director of sport of La7 and director of the digital terrestrial channel called La7 Sport which was founded in August 2005 but then folded in April 2007.

In May 2006, extracts from intercepted telephone conversations between Biscardi and Luciano Moggi were revealed. In the climate of the scandal which became known as Calciopoli, it was revealed that the Juventus official had instructed Biscardi on what to say or not say during his television programme. Biscardi therefore joined the list of those under investigation (July 2007) and although charges were later dropped they remained on file. In the meantime, Biscardi left La7 (May 2006) and took his programme with him to a new channel, 7 Gold. At the same time, in September 2006, the Italian Order of Journalists imposed a 6-month suspension due to the scandal which led to an open and heated confrontation with the Order.
