= Primantenna =

- Country: Italy
- Broadcast area: Italy

Programming
- Language: Italian
- Picture format: 16:9 576i (SDTV); 1080i (HDTV upscaled)

History
- Launched: November 1976

Links
- Website: Primantenna.tv

Availability

Terrestrial
- Free to air (Piedmont): Channel 14
- Free to air (Liguria): Channel 79

Primantenna is an Italian generalist television station which broadcasts to the Piedmont region. It also broadcasts in Liguria on a separate multiplex. The station is based out of Rivoli, Turin Province.

== History ==
The station has its origins in March 1976, from the creation of Studio Televisivo Padano (STP), founded by Domenico Figoli and Cesare Carando, in Alessandria Province. The first test broadcasts were conducted in black and white in December 1976 from Carando's garage, using black and white cameras used for home security systems of the time, and started regular services in January 1977, from premises at Casale Monferrato, on UHF channels 50 and 52. During this phase, it produced news, sports and entertainment offerings; by the late 70s, it became the most popular local station in eastern Piedmont. Carando later became the station's sole owner in the early 80s, relaying GRT's output.

In the early 80s, Carando merged several stations he owned (STP, Prima Antena Vercelli, Rete Manila 1, Cuneo TV, Asti TV and Ayas), but keeping their existing facilities, and rebranded them as Primantenna, using STP's former facilities as an initial operating base. Later, between the late 80s and early 90s, it moved to its current facilities in Rivoli. With the infrastructures acquired in the 1980s, Primantenna started covering all of Piedmont, as well as large parts of the Aosta Valley and Liguria.

In 1994, Primantenna was given the right to operate in Piedmont, Liguria and the Aosta Valley, having granted the adqeuate UHF frequencies.

In the past, it was one of the stronger affiliates of the Supersix network.

The station started satellite broadcasting free-to-air on the Eutelsat 33E satellite on 1 August 2011, leaving on 6 April 2012. It returned to satellite on 13 January 2022 on Eutelsat 9B, leaving on 5 February 2023.
