= Il Campionato dei Campioni =

- Starring: Stefano Peduzzi, Caterina Collovati
- Country of origin: Italy

Production
- Running time: 2 hours

Il Campionato dei Campioni is a Sports talk and debate television program produced by Odeon TV and aired on various affiliated local television channels in Italy, entirely devoted to Italian Soccer, in particular the Serie A.

== Commentators and Presenters ==
=== Actual commentators and presenters ===
- Stefano Peduzzi
- Caterina Collovati
- Andrea Eusebio
- Fulvio Collovati
- Tony Damascelli
- Giancarlo Besana
- Carlo Pellegatti
- Massimo Buscemi
- Andrea Biavardi
- Stefano Eranio
- Alessandro Scanziani
- Paolo Monelli
- Furio Fedele
- Enzo Bucchioni
- Marco Civoli
- Giovanni Lodetti
- Emiliano Nitti
- Nicola Balzani
- Roberto Galia
- Carlo Tagliagambe
