= Tiziano Crudeli =

Italian sports journalist

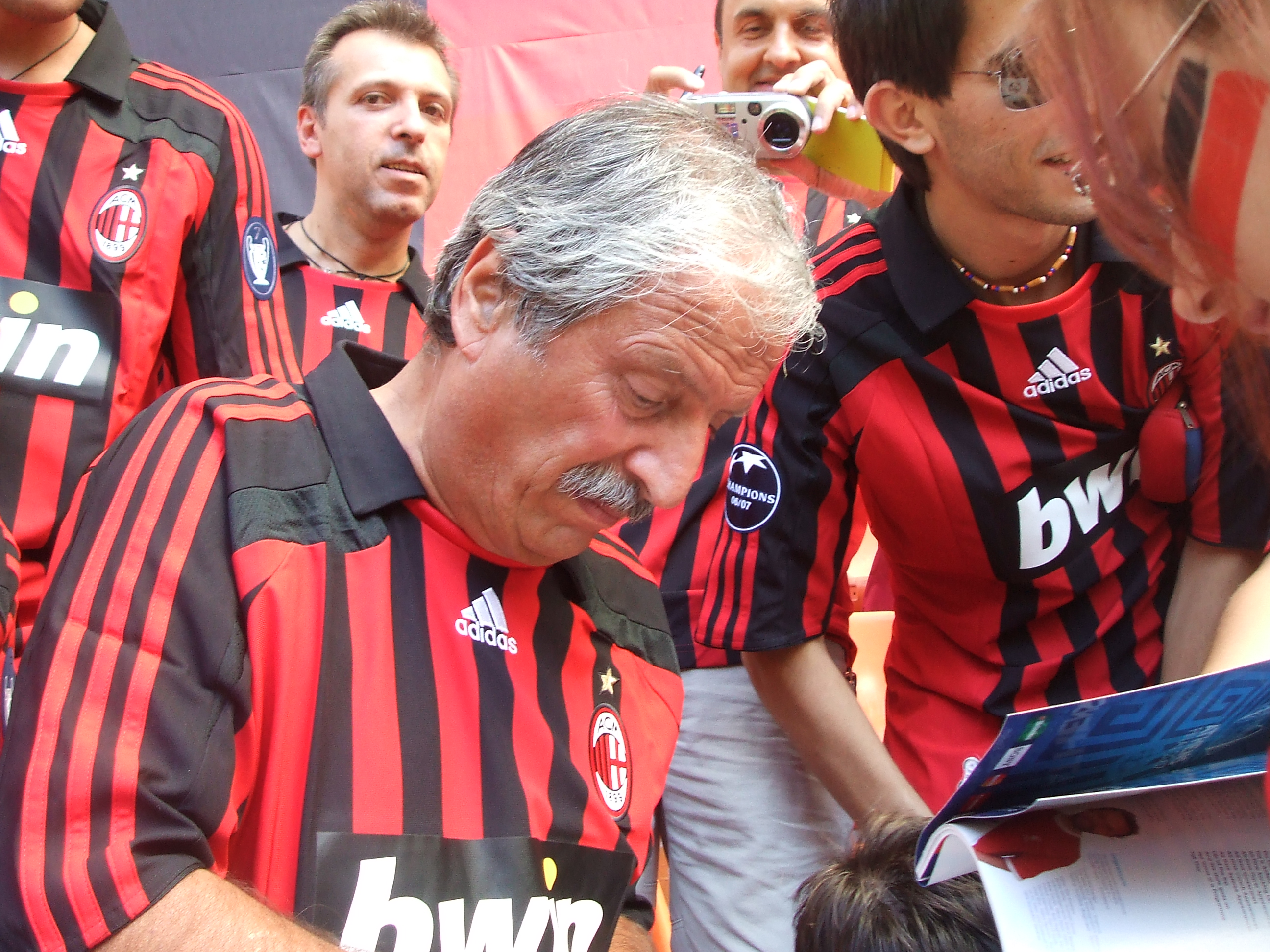
Tiziano Crudeli

Tiziano Crudeli (Italian pronunciation: [titˈtsjaːno kruˈdɛːli]; born 24 June 1943) is an Italian television presenter and sports journalist.

== Biography ==
Crudeli was born in Forlì. Until the age of 30, Crudeli worked as a sales representative, but quit to take on the role as secretary at the Milan Regional Committee of the Italian Tennis Federation, eventually moving on to press secretary.

In terms of journalism, Crudeli became the editor of Italian tennis magazine "Tennis Lombard", before branching into television broadcasting with television channels TVCI and TV Globo.

Following this, he moved away from tennis when given the chance to commentate football games for a radio station, his first game coming in 1987, with AC Milan beating Pescara 2-0.

Written work for newspapers followed, before he became more widely known for his heated debates with Inter Milan fan Elio Corno on the talk show Diretta Stadio in 7 Gold, hosted by Giovanna Martini.

He used this as a springboard to work on other television broadcasts, most notably for the actual AC Milan channel on Sky Italia, while he frequently writes columns for the sport's weekly publication Sprint & Sport Lombardia. Crudeli is a lifelong AC Milan fan, where he is also currently a press officer.

Because of his passionate, enthusiastic and unique football commentary, Crudeli has become something of a celebrity in Italy, and has since 2011 become the face of an English television advertising campaign for Ladbrokes.
