= Colpo Grosso =

Italian television program

- Genre: Game show, Variety show, Erotic
- Directed by: Pino Callà; Celeste Laudisio
- Presented by: Umberto Smaila; Maurizia Paradiso; Massimo Guelfi and Gabriella Lunghi
- Country of origin: Italy
- Original language: Italian
- No. of seasons: 5
- No. of episodes: 1400

Production
- Executive producer: Giancarlo Bettè
- Producers: G.E.I.T. A.S.A. Television
- Production locations: Icet Studios, Cologno Monzese
- Camera setup: Multi-camera
- Running time: 50 minutes

Original release
- Network: Italia 7
- Release: 16 November 1987 – 1992

Colpo Grosso (Big Shot) is an Italian television program, broadcast for five seasons from 1987 to 1992 on the Italia 7 syndication network.

The main host of the program was Umberto Smaila, which was replaced by Maurizia Paradiso in the first part of the final season. After she left the show, she was replaced by Massimo Guelfi and Gabriella Lunghi for the remainder of the season. The first season was directed by Pino Callà, while subsequent seasons were directed by Celeste Laudisio.

The show was produced by Fininvest, the manager of Italia 7's programming at the time. the program was initially set in a casino distinguished by the presence of numerous showgirls who offered stripteases during each episode. The sets became more elaborate as the show went on, with season 3 set in an airport while seasons 4 and 5 were set on a cruise ship. The contestants also had the option to strip in order to increase their score. The show's title was a deliberate reference to the Italian title of the original Oceans 11 film by Frank Sinatra, set in a casino.

Despite being considered by many critics as a lowbrow show of dubious taste, the program achieved enormous public success, especially considering the small channel that broadcast it, with audience peaks exceeding 2 million viewers. Smaila himself, in an interview during Enzo Biagi's program I dieci comandamenti on Rai 1, declared that the audience could easily be identified as the medium-high range.

The popularity of the programme, considered today a cult of commercial television, remained high even after the end of the programme, thanks to the continuous syndication of episodes on regional broadcasters who still owned the masters and on the Mediaset channels Happy Channel (from 1998 to 2005) and Mediaset Extra (since 2015).

== The program ==
Colpo Grosso was produced by G.E.I.T., while its production was handled by A.S.A. Television on behalf of Fininvest. The episodes of the first four editions were recorded at Teatro 12 of Icet Studios in via Peppino Rossi 11/13 in Cologno Monzese (now Big Motion Studios), while for the last season the set was transferred to the studios by A.S.A. Television in Cinisello Balsamo. The filming was entirely carried out using Plumbicon tube cameras, like almost all of the television programs made in Italy in that period. Only for a short period, between December 1989 and January 1990, were CCD digital sensor cameras used.

=== Season 1 (1987–1988) ===
The debut of Colpo Grosso in the television schedules dates back to 16 November 1987: Umberto Smaila hosted it alongside the wardrobe attendant Nadia Picciurro, the croupier Barbara Iaschi (later replaced by Krizia Scognamillo) and the money changer Daniela Lodigiani; Pino Callà is directing. The studio where the show took place was furnished in a style reminiscent of a casino and the contestants (a man and a woman) competed in bets and roulette games. The initial chips for each player were decided by a roll of the same on the slot machine, which contained seven symbols depicting a part of the body to which a different value was attributed (in ascending order: foot, hand, eye, mouth, leg, breast, seat).

The winnings, which could be doubled if the competitor answered correctly to questions posed by the host, were then used to have the masks (four masked men and four women) remove their clothes, while in the event of an insufficient number of chips with to play, the competitors themselves could strip to increase their assets. The aim of the game was to completely undress all the masks (the last piece of clothing they took off was the mask over their eyes) and make the so-called big shot (the titular "colpo grosso"), winning the entire prize pool. The contestant who made the biggest win, but not the big score, had the chance to remain as the reigning champion for the next episode.

The initial formula of the program was progressively changed over the course of the episodes. Among the main changes were the addition of a co-host, Daniela Fornari, the elimination of male masks and the inclusion of a musical space in which Smaila could perform on the piano.

=== Season 2 (1988–1989) ===
The second season of the program started on 5 September 1988, with the passing of the directorial baton from Pino Callà to Celeste Laudisio. The host Umberto Smaila, the co-host Daniela Fornari (later replaced by Linda Lorenzi starting from 4 November 1988) and the croupier Daniela Lodigiani were confirmed.

Numerous changes compared to the previous edition, also due to a greater economic investment by the broadcaster: Rosanna Olmo joined the cast as a notary, Tina Pepe as a cashier, Stefania Valentini as a valet, Stefano Celoria and Lais Silvess as cloakroom attendants; the scenography, although still reminiscent of a casino, was totally renewed; the masks were renamed strip-chips and represented various professional figures in each episode who were often given original names such as "Esagerata", "Scappatella", "Maria la O", "Tripla", etc.; new heats were also established for the competitors, including the slot machine, dice and French cards, but the most significant innovation concerned the introduction of the "Lucky Charms": seven girls of different nationalities representing as many lucky symbols (Esther Aregall the iron horse, Natasja Narain the rabbit, Deborah Zapparata the horn, Natacha Velimirovic the joker, Alma Lo Moro the four-leaf clover, Monique Sluyter the number 13 and Viemla Jagroep the ladybug). The symbol assigned to them, in addition to differentiating the color of their costume, was placed as a left nipple cover during the shows/strips in which they performed.

These girls quickly became one of the most well-known features of the program, so much so that in those years the final part of one of their segments was played every evening during the intro of Rai 3's Blob. In the musical space Umberto Smaila was accompanied by Nylon (Maurizio Filippi, Diego Michelon, Renzo Meneghinello) during the live performance of the musical pieces; furthermore, in the Saturday episode Linda Lorenzi performed magic tricks and the closing theme song was replaced by the striptease of one of the Portafortuna girls.

Starting from February 1989, themed evenings were also held in discos throughout Italy, in which Umberto Smaila and some strip-chips involved the public in participating in games inspired by the television broadcast.

=== Season 3 (1989–1990) ===
Aired from 4 September 1989 to 1 June 1990, the third edition of Colpo Grosso probably represents the most successful one of the programme. The presence of Linda Lorenzi was confirmed alongside Umberto Smaila as host, the busty Tiziana D'Arcangelo made her appearance as cashier, and she passed to the role of valet (after having been one of the Lucky Charm girls in the previous season) Monique Sluyter; Stefano Celoria also confirmed as cloakroom attendant.

While maintaining casino-inspired games, the same as the previous edition, the cash prize pool was replaced by the use of chips (called Eurofiches), while the final prizes were replaced by household appliances and, in case of a big score, by a trip to abroad paid by the production and the sponsor of the program (the Panto fixtures, for which there was also a gift card for each player and a dedicated game). The scenography, significantly changed compared to previous editions, no longer represented a casino but the waiting room of an airport, a symbol with which the program celebrated the opening of the borders of Eastern European countries towards the Western world.

Consequently, the strip-fiches (which entered the studio by descending from the ladder of an airplane) were renamed flags because each one depicted a geographical area of Europe. Finally the Lucky Charm girls were replaced by the Cheers girls: seven girls representing as many fruit drinks with the same role as the Lucky Charms: Nadia Visintainer the pineapple, Esther Kooiman known as "Amy" the cherry, Esther the strawberry, Natacha Velimirovic the kiwi, Stella Kobs the lemon, Angelique the tangerine and Jacqueline Hammond the blueberry. The popularity of the program was such that it dedicated a space in the Saturday episode to the post office corner, where Linda Lorenzi responded to letters and gifts received from viewers of the program (the address to write to was: Colpo Grosso, Casella Postale 112, 20093 Cologno Monzese).

There were several protests against the program, with hundreds of letters sent by a group of Venetian women to the sponsor, who threatened with a boycott. During the 1990 FIFA World Cup held in Italy (from 8 June to 8 July), the program, after a suspension in the first week of June, resumed in conjunction with the tournament, taking the name of Colpo grosso 90 – rivediamole insieme (Let's Rewatch Them Together), and broadcast a selection of stripteases taken from old episodes, then extending the editions with this formula until almost the end of August.

=== Season 4 (1990–1991) ===
The references to geography and travel reached their peak in the 4th season of Colpo Grosso, which began on 10 September 1990 and aired until 29 June 1991 (with a brief interruption during the Christmas period, from 23 December to 6 January, and in Easter period, from 28 March to 1 April), in which the scenography was inspired by a cruise ship of which Umberto Smaila was the captain. Joining him in what was his last season as host were Welshwoman Amy Charles as cashier, already present among the flags of the previous edition with the names of Albarosa and Tripla, and Czechoslovak Žaneta Fajová as cloakroom attendant. The presence of the Cin Cin girls was also confirmed, who have now become a symbol of the program, in this edition played by Jessica (cherry), Lena (pineapple), Susanne (kiwi), Suzana (lemon), Renate (tangerine), Michelle (strawberry) and Bernardine (blueberry).

Compared to previous editions, the regulation underwent various changes, detaching itself from the initial mechanism linked to casino games: the competitors' prize money was no longer counted in chips but in points, which were used by the competitors to visit European countries during the cruise on the ship. of Big Shot; for each country visited we witnessed the striptease of the Star of Europe (name with which the flags were already called in the last episodes of the previous edition) representing that country. Roulette, dice and French card games were abolished from the beginning and later also the historic slot machine game, replaced by games linked to sponsors (such as the Vitec question and the Panto island game). At the end of each episode two possible scenarios could occur:

- In the event that the two competitors had managed to visit fewer than four countries, the one who had obtained the most points (or with the same points, the one who had visited the most countries) became the winner of the bet and, if he had won two bets (out of a maximum of three ) against his challenger, he acquired the title of "champion", eliminating his challenger from the game and returning in the next episode against a new competitor, always with the best of two bets won out of a maximum of three.
- In the event that one of the two competitors managed to visit at least four countries, they had the possibility to choose whether to settle for winning the episode (and, in the case of winning two episodes, to become "champion" by returning in the next episode against a new challenger) or play for the Colpo Grosso by answering within a time limit of 60 seconds to a final question from a series of 36 prepared by the authors of the program (the number from 1 to 36 in which the ball stopped on the roulette determined the choice ) with the possibility of doubling the score obtained; if 0 was rolled, the question was not asked and the Big Score was obtained automatically. The mechanism of the "big question" closely followed that of the "doubling" typical of the final game of the various quizzes conducted by Mike Bongiorno, i.e. in the event of a correct answer to all the questions contained in the "big question" (or in the case in which 0), the contestant won a trip around the world, had the right to have both the Stars of Europe not previously stripped in previous games and also a Superstar girl (a model or sometimes a girl who appeared on the show in previous years as flag or Cheers girl), who undressed completely (the only case during the program). In the other cases the striptease was not complete because when the girl took off her underwear, there was a thong underneath which prevented the full view of her pubis. Furthermore, he eliminated his challenger from the game and did not return in the next episode (in this case two new competitors took part in the following episode, always the best of the two bets won out of a maximum of three), but as soon as a wrong answer was given (or if at the end of 60 seconds not all the correct answers had been given) he lost all the points accumulated, was automatically eliminated from the game and handed over the champion title to his challenger, who would return in the next episode against a new competitor.

Over the course of the episodes, there were some welcome returns to the cast of the show, including Natacha Velimirovic as Superstar, Stefano Celoria as cloakroom/handboy, Monique Sluyter as assistant host and Angelique and Alma among the Cheers girls. During the last week of broadcast the same Cin Cin girls ironically participated in the game as competitors, alternating with each other. In the last episode Angelique replaced Amy, who was the last competitor and challenged Nylon drummer Francesco Casale.

=== Season 5 (1991–1992) ===
After four very successful years Umberto Smaila abandoned hosting the show, having obtained the opportunity to realize his dream of a musical on the life of Fred Buscaglione. Maurizia Paradiso was chosen as his heir, a character already known to the night-time public for having presented some programs with erotic content on various local television stations, who was joined by Gabriella Lunghi. The 5th season aired on 16 September 1991 immediately introducing many new features in the game mechanism, including the participation of two female competitors (with consequent abolition of the male competitor): each game, question or the striptease to which the contestant underwent gave her the victory of a "little heart", the final sum of which declared the winner of the episode; the same hearts were then posted on a gigantic folder inspired by the game of bingo and the achievement of an ambo, terno, quaterna or cinquina allowed the contestant to undress one of the Stars present in the studio. Compared to previous editions, the presence of a Superstar was reconfirmed, who would have provided a full striptease in the event of a bingo by a competitor, and of the Cin Cin girls (Ester the pineapple, Adèle the kiwi, Elke the strawberry, Nadège the blueberry, Simone the tangerine, Caroline the lemon and Jacqueline the cherry).

The new hosting style brought by Paradiso gave the program a more light-hearted but also more erotic tone, with a greater number of stripteases compared to previous editions. The new formula, however, did not achieve the hoped-for success and, following misunderstandings between the presenter and the production, starting from the episode of 4 February 1992, the hosting of the program was temporarily entrusted to Gabriella Lunghi. Subsequently, starting from 17 February 1992, Massimo Guelfi was joined. In this new version, following numerous requests from the female audience, the male competitor was proposed again in the game mechanism; new games were created, the scenography was renewed and we also witnessed the return to the scene of Nylon, who remained solely in the guise of musical authors in the first months of broadcast.

=== End ===
After five years of programming and over 1,000 episodes recorded, the show was not reconfirmed for the 1992/1993 television season. According to the statements of the managers of Italia 7 during the announcement of the closure, the main reason would have been a decline in audience due to disinterest in the "striptease" genre, but more likely it would be identified in the lower quality of the hosts who succeeded Smaila. A final attempt to recover the program was made by proposing its management to Pupo. The new edition should have started on 21 September 1992, but never saw the light of day due to disagreements between the authors and requests for changes to the program made by the singer.

During the 1992/93 television season, various episodes, broadcast in previous editions, were repeated in a container called Colpo Grosso Story. Subsequently, several seasons of the show were periodically repeated in Italy by some local TV channels, by the satellite broadcaster Happy Channel and by the digital channel Mediaset Extra. The reruns also involved some foreign countries such as Portugal, Greece, Albania, Turkey, Russia and Japan, where a subtitled version also sold on the internet as Pay-per-view content was seen with considerable success. In Brazil, its version was produced and aired by SBT presented by Luis Carlos Miele from 1991 to 1992.

== The Colpo Grosso girls ==
Some of the women featured on the show already had experience in the world of glamor or erotic photography. In some cases women who had applied as contestants were then hired into the program as strippers and in turn some strippers were promoted to Cheers Girls. Some of the strippers and Cin Cin girls then continued their careers in the world of entertainment or otherwise became part of the so-called star system. Among these the main girls were:

- the Italian Nadia Picciurro, busty and unfortunate valet of the first edition. She was awarded the title of "Miss Seno Mozzafiato" in 1987 and participated as a regular guest in the program L'Araba fenice by Antonio Ricci as the valet of Colpo Grosso. She died at the age of 19 on the night of 10 June 1988 in a car accident; However, the episodes recorded before the event were still broadcast for about twenty days after her death, a decision that shocked the public; this news was clarified in 2015 by the host Umberto Smaila through a post on Facebook
- the Dutch model Monique Sluyter, Lucky Girl with the number 13 in the second edition and valet in the third. She made her debut in the world of music by performing the theme song of the third season and became part of the cast of the first two editions of Tutti Frutti alongside the host Hugo Egon Balder. She then continued her career as a playmate (obtaining the cover of the Dutch edition of Playboy four times) and singer (with the single I want your body produced by EMI) and also participated in some cameos in non-erotic films. In 2005 she took part in a remake of Colpo Grosso entitled Showgirls, broadcast on Happy Channel, and in 2016 she participated in the new edition of Tutti Frutti.
- the Italian Alma Lo Moro, in the cast of the program for 4 editions. She made her debut as a mask in the first edition and later participated as a four-leaf clover lucky girl and subsequently a blueberry cheers girl in 1989/1990 and a strawberry girl in 1990/1991; in 1989 she made her debut as an actress in the erotic film La boutique by Lorenzo Onorati.
- the Dutch (later naturalized French) Esther "Amy" Kooiman, first cherry of the Cin Cin girls 1989/1990. After leaving the program in January 1990, she became famous in the world of pornography with the stage name of "Zara White". Once her acting career ended in 2001, she began to work for environmental and animal protection, also running for the French legislative elections in 2007 under the pseudonym of Esther Spincer.
- the Italian Tiziana D'Arcangelo, junoesque cashier of the 1989/1990 edition, took part in the first two editions of Tutti Frutti. He later held secondary roles in some Italian and Dutch films.
- the Italian Nadia Visintainer, first Cin Cin pineapple girl of the 1989/1990 edition. She joined the program after working as a model and singer for a few years. Leaving the role in February 1990 after getting married, she continued her career in the entertainment world as a theater producer and musician. In recent years he has taken part in various television programs (including Lucignolo, I soliti ignoti, Matrix and an evening dedicated entirely to Colpo Grosso hosted by Alda D'Eusanio on Rai 2) revealing in an interview that in illo tempore he had received some "advances" from an important politician, who in exchange promised her a brilliant career in the world of entertainment, but she refused outright and therefore encountered many difficulties in remaining in the "circle". In May 2016 she published a book dedicated to her experience as a Cin Cin girl, entitled "Piacere, sono quella di Colpo grosso".
- the Swedish Jasmine Lipovsek, competitor in the 1989/1990 season. She was first "promoted" to the role of Little Flag and later became the second strawberry of the Cin Cin girls replacing Esther. She continued to work as a photo model and later married Formula One driver Ivan Capelli.
- the German Stella Kobs, lemon Cin Cin girl of the 1989/1990 edition. Born in Esslingen on 28 February 1963, she worked for 15 years as a model in Europe and Los Angeles and was Playmate of the Month twice (July 1986 and June 1987) under the name Stella Adorf, as well as Playmate of the Year 1987 of the German edition of Playboy. Committed to the environment, she was a member of the German Greens in the regional parliament of the state of Baden-Württemberg; she is currently an autogenic training hypnotherapist and promotes online, on his website, a system of body care and beauty through sessions in which trance states are induced. In 2016 he participated as a guest in the new edition of Tutti Frutti.
- the Hungarian Deborah Wells, contestant in the third season. He returned to the cast of the program in the same edition as Bandierina and the following year as Superstar; already a model for the German edition of Playboy, in the early 90s she participated in some Rai programs and as an actress in Paprika by Tinto Brass, she later became one of the most famous porn stars of the period working in various European and American hardcore productions.
- the Italian Debora Vernetti (or also Deborah), competitor in the 1989/1990 season. She was first "promoted" to the role of Bandierina with the name of Orbetella and the following year as Superstar. She was the first woman to appear naked on a Rai network in Pippo Baudo's program Uno su cento. He took part in the films Christmas Vacation '90 with Diego Abatantuono and Paprika by Tinto Brass.
- the German Mikki Brenner, Bandierina with the names of Pimpinella and Benvenuto. In the 1990s she was a model for Penthouse and worked as a pornographic actress.
- the Welsh Amy Charles, Bandierina in the third edition with the names Albarosa and Tripla. Much appreciated by the public for her exuberant forms, she became cashier of the program in the fourth edition, revealing a mild and reserved character but also good singing skills. After the end of the program he recorded some dance music songs published in various collections of the genre during the 1990s.
- the German Elke Jeinsen, Star of Europe in the 1990/1991 edition and later strawberry Cheers girl in the fifth season. Born in Stockholm on 25 July 1966, but lived in Germany from the age of one, in 1986 she became Miss Hannover, came second in the Miss Germany competition and in October of that year she posed nude for the German edition of Playboy. After her experience in broadcasting she continued her career as a model and actress by participating in various programmes, films and TV series (including an episode of Baywatch and a part in Crocodile Dundee 3), as well as in the video for the song Night Calls by Joe Cocker. In the 2000s he also participated in soft-core films such as "Every Man's Fantasy 2".
- the German Simone Burkhard, Superstar in the fourth season of the program and Mandarin girl Cheers in the fifth. Born in Mannheim on 30 October 1967, she was a Playmate for the German edition of Playboy in January 1988 and was subsequently featured in Playboy Special Edition (Playboy girls of summer 1993) as well as in the magazine "Perfect 10" in 1998.
- the Hungarian Antónia Valéria Bálint, Star of Europe in the fourth and fifth editions with the name of Annalisa. Born on 30 May 30, 1969 in Budapest, she won the title of Miss Hungary 1991 (title revoked because she had posed nude and then returned to her following legal proceedings); she later became a television presenter in her country and in 2014 she was elected neighborhood councilor in Angyalföld on the lists of the conservative Fidesz party.
- the Californian Tracy Dali, present in 1991 in the German edition of the program as a stripper. Over the years she will star in a few dozen films, both as a protagonist and as an extra (the latter role in which she had had experience even before Big Score, having briefly appeared in Back to the Future Part II).

== Soundtrack ==
Over the course of the various editions, various theme tunes and jingles were created for the broadcast, all published on 45 rpm:

- "Colpo grosso" (Ziglioli-Smaila), intro theme of the 1987/1988 season performed by Mirò Band;
- "Melo' Do Marinheiro" (Ribero, Barone), ending theme of the 1987/1988 season performed by Samambaia;
- "Colpo grosso" (Gregori-Radici), intro theme of the 1988/1989 season performed by Ragazze Portafortuna;
- "Esagerata" (Attarantato-Masini-Salvatori), ending theme of the 1988/1989 season performed by Monique Sluyter.

== International versions ==
Country	Local Title	Host(s)	Network	Year aired
Italy (original format)	Colpo grosso	Umberto Smaila (1987–1991); Maurizia Paradiso (1991–1992); Massimo Guelfi and Gabriella Lunghi (1992)	Italia 7	1987–1992
Brazil	Cocktail	Luís Carlos Miele	SBT	August 23, 1991 – August 13, 1992
Germany	Tutti frutti	Hugo Egon Balder (1990–1993); Jörg Draeger (2016); Alexander Wipprecht (2016)	RTL; RTL Nitro	January 21, 1990 – February 21, 1993; 2016
Spain	¡Ay, qué calor!	Luis Cantero and Eva María Pedraza López	Telecinco	1991
Sweden	Tutti frutti	Bruno Wintzell and Dominika Peczynski	TV3	1994
