= Carlo Pellegatti =

Italian sports journalist

Carlo "Carletto" Pellegatti (Italian pronunciation: [ˈkarlo karˈlɛtto ˌpɛlleˈɡatti]; born 11 April 1950 in Milan) is an Italian sports journalist, football commentator and YouTuber. He is known for his passionate and partial commentary and interviews, when he makes use of several and creative nicknames.

== Biography ==
Graduated in Political Sciences, he started his career in 1983 as radio commentary of AC Milan games. After a long career in Qui studio a voi stadio, he started working for Mediaset as correspondent for Studio Sport in the late 80s. Since 7 July 1994, he is a professional journalist, member of the Order of Journalists in Lombardy. In the early 2000s, he was the commentator of Milan Serie A games working initially for Milan Channel and then for Mediaset Premium. He also worked as columnist for Milan Channel, a role he still fulfils. He collaborated with the magazine Forza Milan, then in 2011 he became MilanNews.it editorialist. He was also columnist for Odeon TV in the TV broadcast Campionato dei Campioni. After 35 years, on 22 August 2018, he announced his retirement from commentary, the last one being Milan-Fiorentina on 20 May 2018. Following that, he created a YouTube channel, where he talks about Milan issues. On 1 September 2018, he changed his mind about leaving commentary, restarting his activity for TopCalcio24. Since 2 September 2018, he was guest of the TV show Pressing. After the latter was cancelled, he passed to Sky Sport.

He is an AC Milan fan since 1957. He also cultivates an interest in horse racing, making predictions for La Gazzetta dello Sport. After 35 years, on 22 August 2018, he announced his retirement from commentary, the last one being Milan-Fiorentina on 20 May 2018. Following that, he created a YouTube channel, where he talks about Milan issues. Since 2018, he has been active on YouTube with his channel Carlo Pellegatti, where he shares news and often highly personal and imaginative interpretations and delusions regarding AC Milan. On 1 September 2018, he changed his mind about leaving commentary, restarting his activity for TopCalcio24.
