= Super Six (TV channel) =

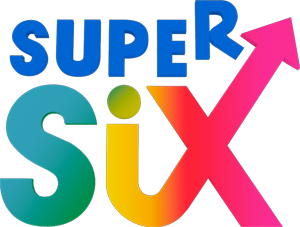
- Country: Italy
- Broadcast area: Italy

Programming
- Language: Italian
- Picture format: 1080i HDTV (downscaled to 576i for the SD feed)

History
- Launched: 1988; 38 years ago

Links
- Website: supersixtv.net

Availability

Terrestrial
- Digital terrestrial television: Channel 833 (HbbTV)

Super Six is an Italian commercial television network. It started broadcasting in 1988 in its initial version as a syndication network, which, in its first incarnation, lasted until 2008. It resumed broadcasting on digital terrestrial as a part-time channel, and a full-time service on streaming.

== History ==
Super Six was founded in 1988 by Gianni Ferrauto (formerly of Euro TV) and was directed by Giuliano Coacci. Its programming at launch included a news program for the youth, music shows created in collaboration with British channel-turned-production company Music Box, subtitled, original music programs, the sports program Catch the Catch, with highlights from New Japan Pro Wrestling, and anime in the Bimbo slot. Notable affiliates during this phase included Primantenna, Teleprima, TRP Teleradio Peloritana, Tele Uno Tris, ETV Marche, Napoli TV, Tele Reggio, Firenze TV and others.

In 1994, the channel's directive passed on to Gianfranco Ferrauto's son Giampaolo. Over time, there were changes to the affiliate portfolio.

In March 2008, the Sitcom Group acquired the Super Six and Euro TV brands from RE.T.E. - Reti Televisive Europee srl, Super Six being the only one of the two that was still active. The group had long-term perspectives for the network, by setting a foothold on analog television as a lure for the digital switchover. With the acquisition, Super Six stopped carrying cartoons in its new schedule, which was replaced by Facile TV.

In June 2018, the Super Six brand was revived with a local television station in Friuli-Venezia-Giulia, 24 hours a day, then from 3 June 2019 as a national circuit, airing anime under the Ka-Boom brand, which was previously a separate channel between 2013 and 2014. Music programming is also a part of the revived channel.
