= Euro TV =

Italian television network (1982–1987)

- Country: Italy
- Broadcast area: Italy

Programming
- Language: Italian

History
- Launched: 10 March 1982; 44 years ago
- Closed: 5 September 1987; 39 years ago
- Replaced by: Odeon TV (some stations); Italia 7 (some stations)

Euro TV was an Italian syndication circuit with national coverage, delivered through affiliated local television stations between 1982 and 1987. After its closure, some of its stations created Odeon TV (renamed Odeon 24 in 2014) which is the direct inheritor (broadcasts started the day following Euro TV's closure), and others to the competing Italia 7 network, which started broadcasting a few months later.

== History ==
Euro TV launched on 10 March 1982 at the initiative of Gianni Ferrauto, former delegate administrator of il Giornale and also manager of the TV Port circuit, and then-Parmalat president Calisto Tanzi, already manager of the Jolly network. The brand was owned by advertising exploitation company STP and RadioVideo through their joint company STP-RV.

Born emulating the syndication model of the American television industry, it consisted of eighteen local television stations which, simultaneously, broadcast identical programs for six hours a day, in the afternoon and evening slots, with current affairs programming, sporting events and feature films, and which for the rest of the schedule remained independent in their editorial line according to their regional demands.

Its limited success, due also to the acquisition of part of Rete 4's film and TV series repertory following an agreement that was not respected by Mondadori, at the time owner of the latter, made the "local" network leader in the battles for the juridic regulation of the sector, to an extent where it said in a press release that "the need and urgence of a precise legislative intervention in order to fill the gap, privileging the associative norms between local stations and consenting each one to know what it is allowed and what it is forbidden". During 1986, when talks of a law to regulate the television sector began, Ferrauto and Tanzi started investing in interconnection between the stations part of the circuit, in the sense of creating a national news bulletin: in this period, 14 local news bulletins were already born, one for each affiliate station, which could form the future national newscast.

Euro TV's experience finished on 5 September 1987, coinciding with the launch, in the following day, of the new Odeon network, founded by Gruppo Acqua Marcia. After several sales, however, part of the affiliate repertory decided to associate to Fininvest's new network, Italia 7.

After its closure, the unused Euro TV brand was acquired, at the same time as Supersix by RE.T.E. - Reti Televisive Europee, which, in 2008, was acquired in turn by Sitcom. On 10 June 2021, the Euro TV brand, revived by a new company alongside Supersix, resumed as an autonomous channel available only on the HbbTV service on digital terrestrial television (initially on three channels; since 2024, only on channel 833), as well as streaming on its own website and mobile application. The new programming, of vintage type, largely includes films, reruns of TV series and music shows.
