= Diretta Stadio =

- Starring: Giovanna Martini, Federico Bertone
- Country of origin: Italy

Production
- Production location: Assago
- Running time: 3/4 hours

Original release
- Network: 7 Gold (1999-present)
- Release: 1999 – present

Diretta Studio (known also with the acronym Diretta Stadio and Diretta Stadio... ed è subito goal!) is a Sports talk and debate television program produced by 7 Gold and aired on various affiliated local television channels in Italy, entirely devoted to Italian football, in particular the Serie A. Currently, it features live commentary of football matches by journalists who support various clubs (in particular Milan, Inter, Juventus and Napoli, with occasional guest commentaries from supporters of Fiorentina, Roma and Lazio, as well as discussion of international football and issues affecting the game.

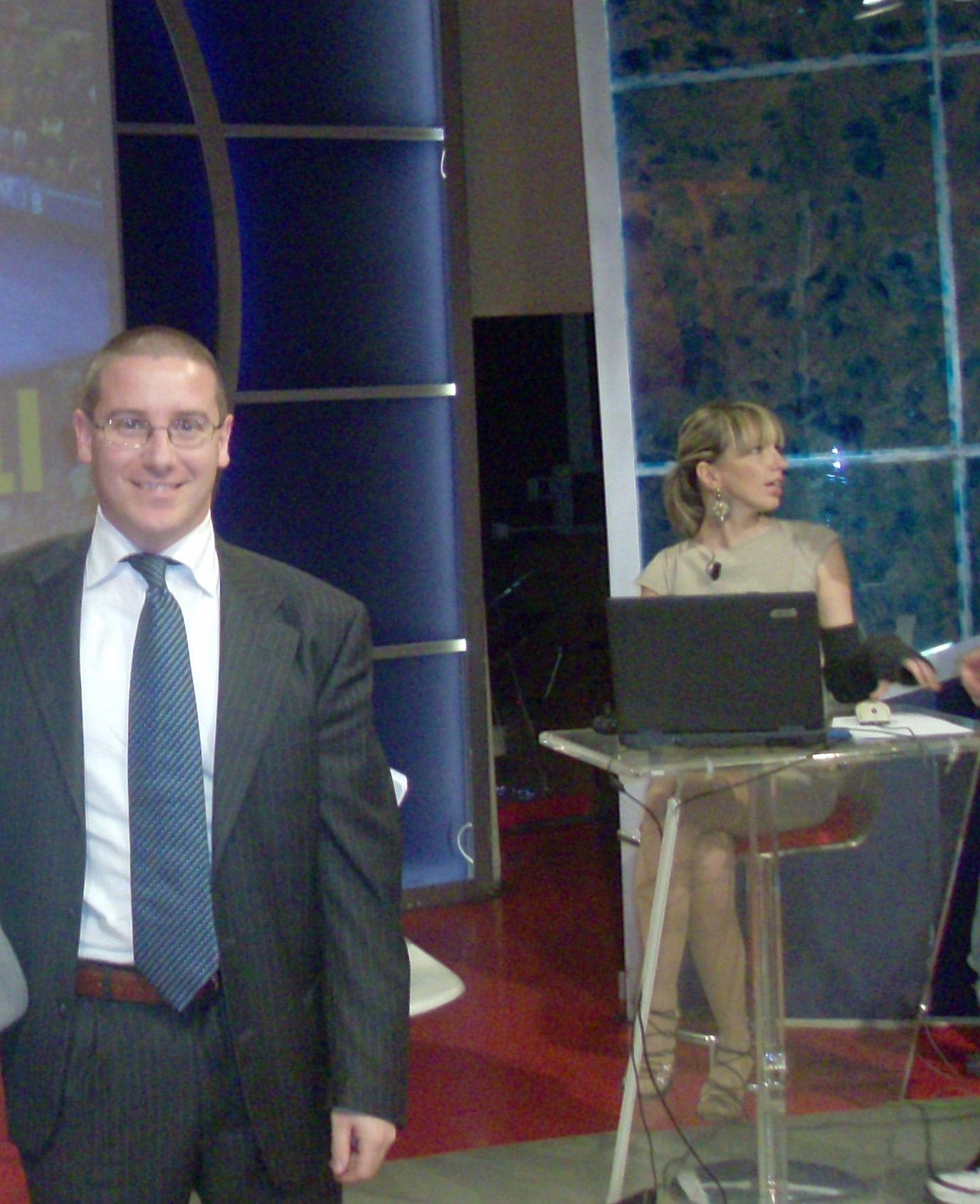
Francesco Bonfanti and Alessandra Magni

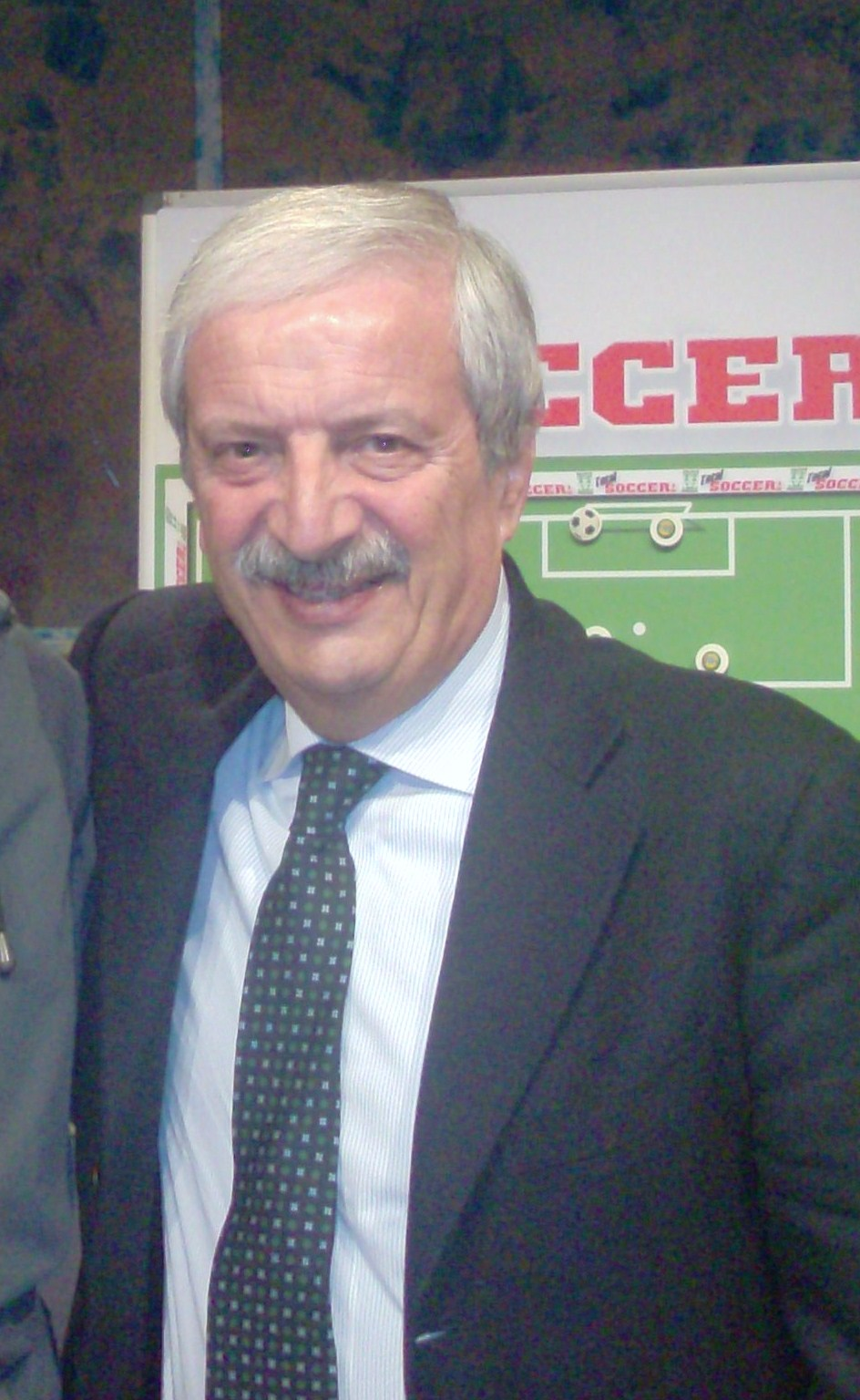
Tiziano Crudeli

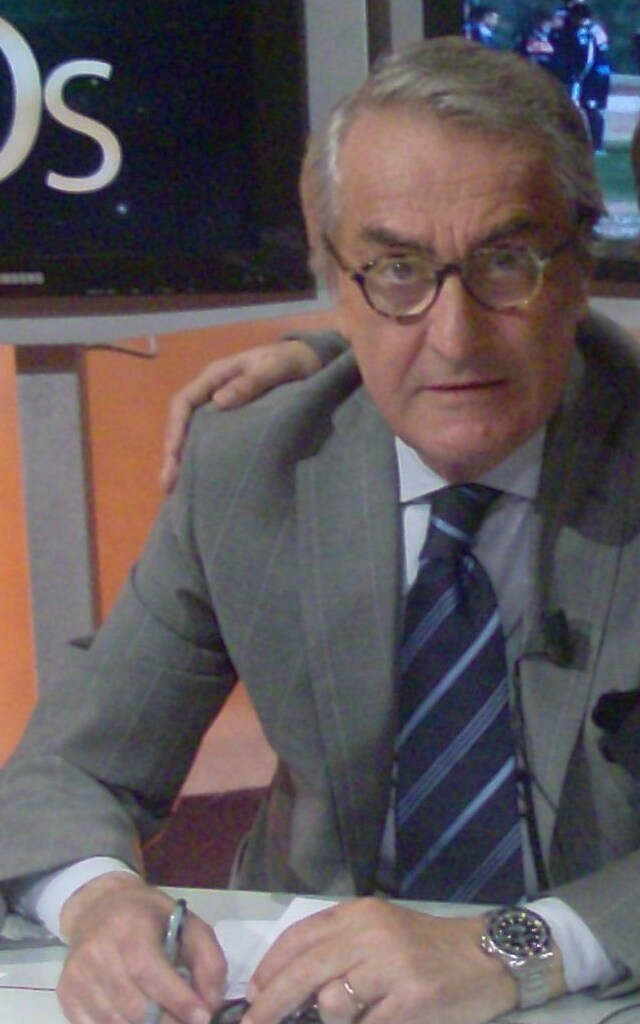
Elio Corno

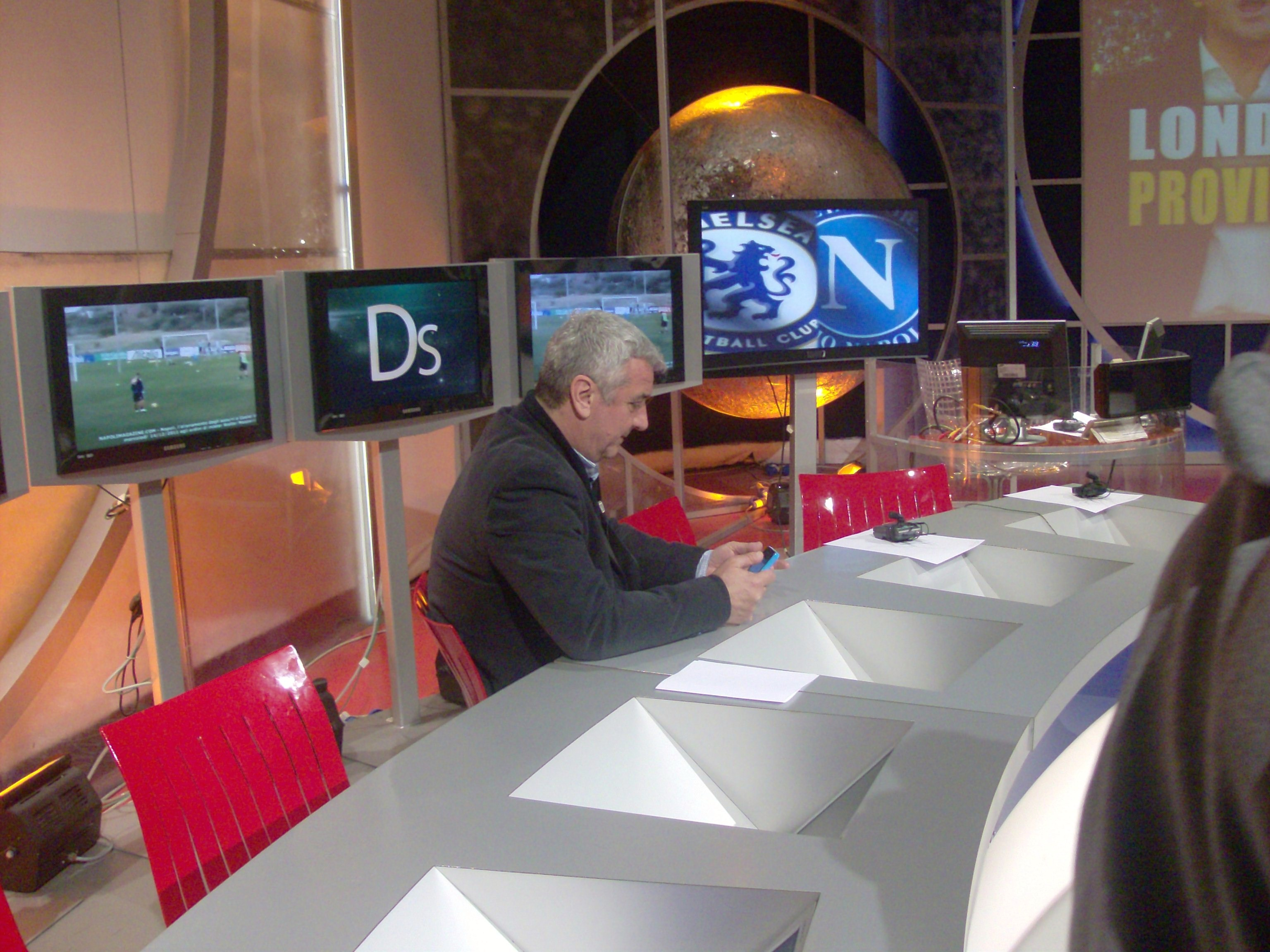
Evaristo Beccalossi

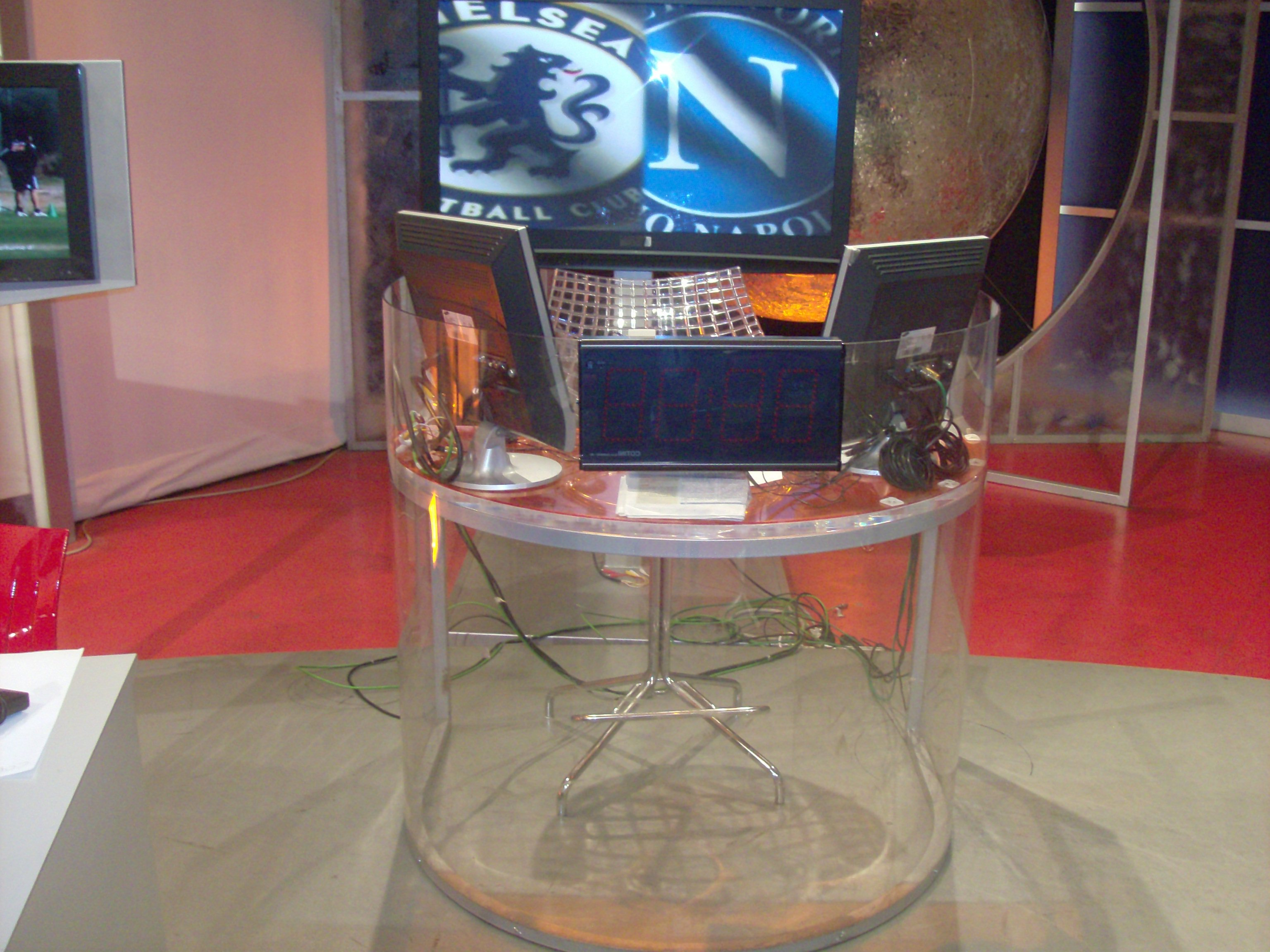

== Commentators and Presenters ==
=== Actual commentators and presenters ===
- Giovanna Martini
- Federico Bertone
- Francesco Bonfanti
- Paolo Marcello
- Tiziano Crudeli (Milan match commentator)
- Elio Corno
- Furio Fedele
- Franco Melli
- Antonio Paolino
- Marika Fruscio
- Massimo Brambati
- Danilo Sarugia
- Roberto Bettega
- Mauro Bellugi
- Filippo Tramontana (Inter match commentator)
- Gianni Solaroli
- Fabio Santini
- Giorgio Vitali
- Carmelo Bongiovanni
- Antonio Sabato (footballer)
- Alessandro Ghigo
- Paolo Specchia

=== E-mail ===
- Melissa Castagnoli
- Alessandra Magni
- Lara Denora
- Livia Ronca

=== Former commentators and presenters ===
- David Messina
- Evaristo Beccalossi
- Giorgio Micheletti
- Emilio Bianchi
- Andrea Bosio
- Giovanni Lodetti
- Corrado Fumagalli
- Alessandro Biolchi
- Francesco Gullo
- Mimmo Pesce (Napoli match commentator)
- Pietro Anastasi
- Michelangelo Rampulla
