= Ric e Gian =

Italian comedy duo

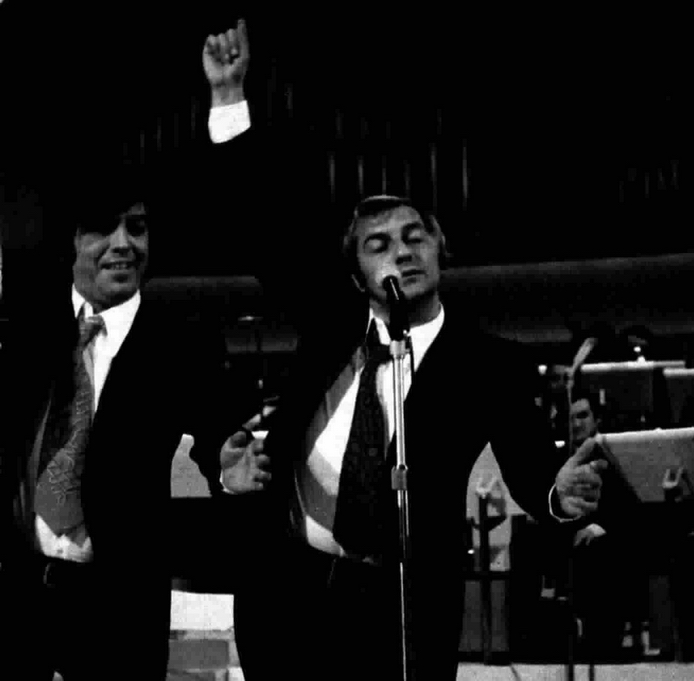
Ric e Gian (Senza Rete, 1972)

Riccardo Miniggio (Turin, 31 December 1935) and Gian Fabio Bosco (Florence, 30 July 1936 - Lavagna, 14 February 2010) were an Italian comedy duo who worked on stage, films and television as Ric e Gian.

== Life and career ==
Miniggio started his career as a dancer-actor in the stage company of Erminio Macario, while Bosco was born in a family of actors and debuted on stage at young age, in the theatrical company of Gilberto Govi.

The couple met in an avanspettacolo at the Teatro Maffei in Turin, where Miniggio worked as a dancer and Bosco was the sidekick of the actor Mario Ferrero. They then decided to performing together as Jerry e Fabio and worked in various theaters, nights and cabarets in Northern Italy as well as at the Crazy Horse in Paris. Noted by film producer Angelo Rizzoli, they renamed themselves Ric e Gian in 1962 and made their film debut in Ischia operazione amore (1966).

Starting from the late 1960s, the couple gained popularity thanks to their participation in several prime time RAI variety shows. In the mid-1970s they focused on theatre, and between late 1970s and early 1980s their popularity revamped thanks to a number of Antenna 3 and Fininvest television shows they took part in.

In 1987 the couple split to pursue some solo projects, before briefly reuniting between 2002 and 2006 for a number of stage shows and plays.

In 2010 Bosco died, aged 73, due to an abdominal aortic aneurysm.
