= Odeon 24 =

- Country: Italy
- Broadcast area: Italy

Programming
- Language: Italian
- Picture format: 576i (16:9 SDTV)

Ownership
- Owner: Gold TV

History
- Launched: 6 November 1987; 38 years ago
- Replaced: Euro TV (some stations)

Availability

Terrestrial
- Digital: LCN 177

Odeon 24 was an Italian channel owned by Gold TV, a television network. Originally airing movies, news and weather bulletins, political debates and variety shows, the channel was bought by Primarete and became almost entirely dedicated to infomercials, the non-infomercial programming was removed after Gold TV's buyout of the channel.

== Programming ==
- Il Campionato dei Campioni
- Playmate
- Go-kart
- Detto da voi
