= 7 Gold =

Italian television network

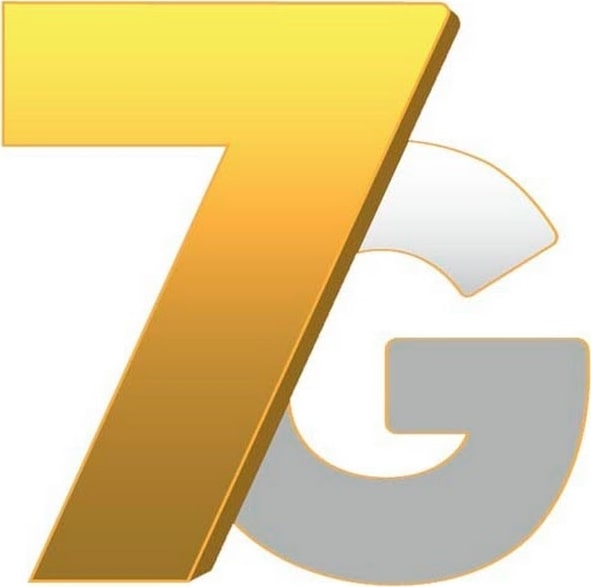
- Logo in use from 10 September 2017.
- Type: Broadcast television network
- Country: Italy

Programming
- Languages: Italian; English (Continuity and promos in Italian, movies/TV series only.)
- Picture format: 576i (4:3 SDTV) (formerly); 1080i (16:9 HDTV) (currently)

History
- Launched: 31 May 1999
- Founder: Giorgio Tacchino; Giorgio Galante; Luigi Ferretti
- Former names: Italia 7 Gold (1999-2003)

Links
- Website: 7goldtelepadova.tv

7 Gold is an Italy-based syndicated television network founded in 1999 by Italian businessmen Giorgio Tacchino, Giorgio Galante and Luigi Ferretti. Currently operating as a broadcast network, it airs TV series (the only one as of 2026 being The Adventures of Shirley Holmes), movies (occasionally), news and weather bulletins, political and sports debates programs and infomercials.

== History ==
7 Gold was founded on 31 May 1999 under the name Italia 7 Gold by entrepreneurs Giorgio Tacchino, Giorgio Galante and Luigi Ferretti, the respective owners of Telecity, Telepadova and Sestarete, three broadcasters already affiliated to Italia 7 (from which Europa 7 was born). The trio decided to create the network after Francesco Di Stefano, founder of Europa 7, participated in the tender for the assignment of frequencies for a national network, thus renouncing the syndication of local broadcasters which until then had broadcast the Europa 7 signal as they would have otherwise become useless.

The station is based in Assago, in the Milanese hinterland, which runs alongside the Castelletto d'Orba office in Piedmont. The network director is Giorgio Galante of Telepadova.

On 15 February 2001, with the match PSV-Parma, Italia 7 Gold was the first circuit of local broadcasters to broadcast a UEFA Cup Round of 16.

On 24 June 2001, when Telemontecarlo became La7, the publisher of the network warned Telecom Italia, owner of the nascent network, from using the name with the number "7" threatening legal actions and polemically marking their broadcasts with a logo bearing the words "La Sette" together with the official one, but the story did not have any sequel.

Initially visible only in northern Italy, it spread a few years later to almost the whole national territory, registering a growing audience which, according to the Auditel surveys, reached peaks of 1.5%, especially in the evening and at night. In the summer of 2006, Telecity took the name Italia 7 on video with a different design from that of the old circuit instead of that of 7 Gold. The various conductors, furthermore, indicate the circuit now with that name. Since September 2006, after the 7 Gold name returned during the summer with a brand similar to the one there was for Italia 7, they have been using the golden logo.

From 10 December 2010 to the end of 2012, 7 Gold programming became visible on the Hot Bird satellite thanks to 7 Gold Telecity; subsequently due to the high satellite management costs, the broadcaster renounced satellite transmissions. The network started "my7.tv" where you can see all the videos of shows like Diretta Stadio on a smartphone. It is also possible to interact with guests in the studio via an app for electronic devices.

On 10 September 2017, 7 Gold renewed its logo and graphics and inaugurates new studios at the headquarters, located in Assago, which allowed the start of the transmission of contents in 16:9 (Additionally, from 1999 to 2017 some imported programs were broadcast in 4:3, except movies broadcast in fullscreen are letterboxed until 2018, then cropped to 16:9 (except some movies produced/aired in 16:9) since the end of 2018). Consequently, the "Silver Production" company was born, an equal joint venture between PRS Mediagroup and 7 Gold. Thus the Prs, as well as being the national advertising agency for 7 Gold, de facto also plays the role of publisher.

From 18 June 2018, 7 Gold is no longer visible in the Sardegna1 MUX as the agreement with 7 Gold has ceased, thus being the only region not covered in Italy until 2023.

In December 2023, Tacchino sold Telecity (Lombardy, Piedmont, Liguria and Valle d'Aosta) to the Netweek group and therefore left the 7 Gold network, thus resulting in 7 Gold airing TOPCalcio24 programming starting January 1, 2024.

== Programming ==
=== Currently ===
- Diretta Stadio
- MotorPad TV
- Casalotto
- Calcissimo
- SuperMercato
- Interconnection
- Apericalcio
- Storie di Calcio
- Pronto 7 Gold - C'è Musica per Te
- TG7 - La Giornata: Italia

=== Formerly ===
- Il Processo di Biscardi
- TG7 Sport
- Soldi
- Funamboli
- Titanic Italia
- Manuel
- Liguria Selection

=== Currently ===
- The Adventures of Shirley Holmes

=== Formerly ===
- Lassie
- The Hunger
- Red Shoe Diaries
- The Adventures of Brisco County, Jr.
- Ultimate Force
- The Adventures of Swiss Family Robinson
- Adventures of the Black Stallion
- The Secret World of Alex Mack
- Paradise
- The Enid Blyton Adventure Series
- Blue Heelers
- Bonanza
- Masada
- Alarm for Cobra 11 (also on Rai 2)
- Split
- Get Smart
