= The Walt Disney Company Italy =

Italian division of the Walt Disney Company

The Walt Disney Company Italia S.r.l.
- Trade name: Disney Italy
- Formerly: Creazioni Walt Disney S.A.I. The Walt Disney Company Italia S.p.A.
- Type: Subsidiary
- Industry: Media conglomerate
- Founded: 8 May 1938
- Headquarters: Milan, Italy
- Area served: Italy
- Key people: Daniel Frigo
- Number of employees: 550
- Parent: The Walt Disney Company EMEA
- Divisions: The Walt Disney Studios Italia
- Website: disney.it

The Walt Disney Company Italia S.r.l. (also Disney Italia; formerly called The Walt Disney Company Italia S.p.A.) is The Walt Disney Company's Italian division and one of The Walt Disney Company's European divisions. The company was founded on 8 May 1938 as Creazioni Walt Disney S.A.I. It is headquartered in Milan.

The television division of the company has produced TV series for Disney Channel Italy. From 1988 to 2013, Disney Italia published digest size comics magazines featuring Disney characters which until then were licensed to Mondadori. (Note: In 2013, the rights were passed to Panini Comics.)

== Divisions ==
- Walt Disney Studios Motion Pictures Italia
- Disney Jr. (Italy)

== Former divisions ==
- Disney XD (Italy) (formerly Fox Kids and Jetix)
- Disney in English
- Disney Channel (Italy)
- Toon Disney
- Disney Store Italy
- FOX (Italy)
- National Geographic (Italy)
- Walt Disney Studios Home Entertainment Italia

== Walt Disney Television Italy ==
The television division of the company has produced series for Disney Channel Italy such as:

- Alex & Co.
- Penny on M.A.R.S.
- Life Bites – Pillole di vita
- Quelli dell'intervallo
  - Quelli dell'Intervallo Cafe
  - Quelli dell'intervallo in vacanza
- Fiore e Tinelli
- Casa Pierpiero
- Chiamatemi Giò
- In tour
- Hip Hop Hurrà
- Sara e Marti #LaNostraStoria

Quelli dell'intervallo (As the Bell Rings) and Life Bites have been subsequently adapted in several other countries, while In tour is an adaptation from Disney Spain's La Gira.

== Films ==
- This Night Is Still Ours (2008)
- Hayfever (2011)
- Alex & Co: How to Grow Up Despite Your Parents (2016)
- Il vegetale (2018)

== Publications ==
- Wizards of Mickey
- MM Mickey Mouse Mystery Magazine
- PKNA
- Topolino
- W.I.T.C.H.
- Monster Allergy
- Kylion

== Design work ==
They designed the mascot (Foody) for the Expo 2015 in Milan.

== See also ==
- The Walt Disney Company France
- List of Disney programs broadcast in Italy
- Mediaset
