= Jacopo Sarno =

Italian actor, voice actor and singer (born 1989)

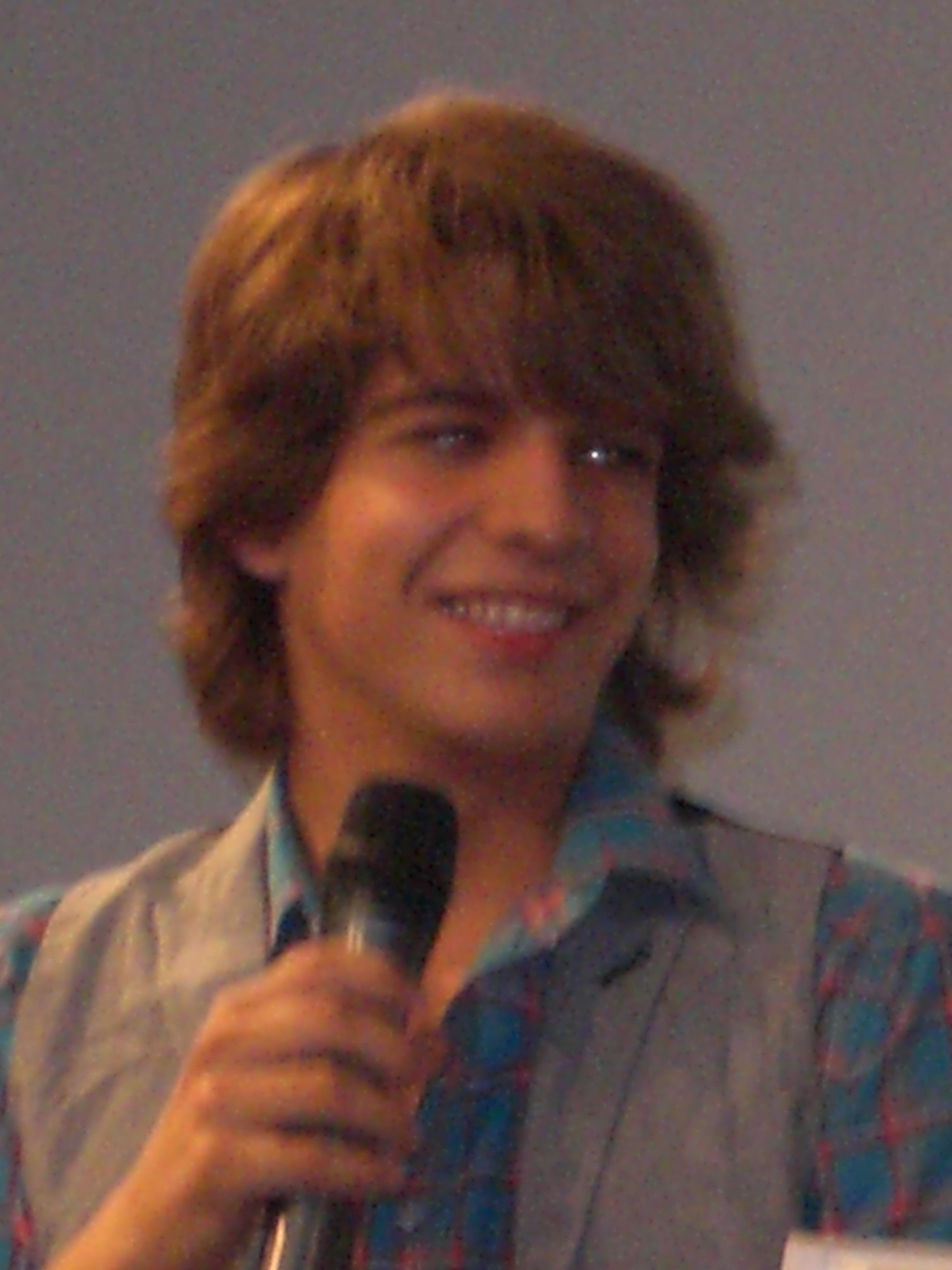
- Jacopo Sarno in 2007

Background information
- Also known as: Jaky, Jake Sarno
- Born: Jacopo Furio Sarno; September 1, 1989 (age 36)
- Origin: Milan, Lombardy, Italy
- Genres: pop
- Occupation: musician
- Instruments: Guitar, piano, harmonica, singing
- Years active: 1995 – present (actor); 2004 – present (singer)
- Labels: Walt Disney Records; EMI (2008–2010); T.Rex Studio; Get Over Records; Cloverthree Music (2016-present)
- Website: www.jacoposarno.net

Jacopo Furio Sarno ([ˈjaːkopo ˈfuːrjo ˈsarno]; born September 1, 1989) is an Italian actor, voice actor and singer. Since 2013 Sarno has been known as "Jake Sarno". Active in the world of acting as a child, he began starring in several sitcoms, most produced by Mediaset. In the early 2000s he continued to work as an actor in theater and film, as well as on television, where he became one of the familiar faces of the sitcom produced by Disney Channel. During his career he has also tried his hand engraving of records and conducting television.

== Biography ==
Sarno was born on September 1, 1989 in Milan. He is the son of Patrizia Bissi and Franz A. Sarno. In 2015, he received his Master of Philosophy degree in University of Milan.

=== Acting and television ===
He made his debut very young and became a familiar face of television by the second half of the 90s, playing in some sitcom and advertising.

In 1995, he made his debut as an actor in the sitcom Io e la mamma (Mom and I), alongside Gerry Scotti and Delia Scala, playing the role Paolino for all seasons, until 1997. Two years later, back on television, he was a regular on Canale 5 and in a sitcom Don Luca, where he played the role of Mirko for only two seasons. The following year he made his film debut, playing a small part in the last film the fantasy saga Fantozzi 2000 - La clonazione (Fantozzi 2000 – Cloning), in which he played the role of a child abandoned by parents too busy with their work. In 2001 he went back to basics and provides the sitcom Bradipo (Sloth), aired on MTV Italy, after a three-year hiatus, he played a small part in the sitcom Il Mammo (The Mom) with Enzo Iachetti and Natalia Estrada.

In 1996 reads short film Il soffitto (The Ceiling), directed by Barbara Nava, and this interpretation was considered Best Actor at Film Festival Messina. He debuted in 2006 as a television host for the music program Nickelodeon Kids' Choice Awards Destination Kids by Nickelodeon. The following year he starred on the show for children of Jaky Quelli dell'intervallo, while in 2010 he obtained a main role in the film by Massimo Boldi A Natale mi sposo.

In the same period he made some appearances in television series Fiore e Tinelli and The Suite Life on Deck, and the music video for the song Grazie a te (Thank you), Ambra Lo Faro.

In 2011, he was one of the stars of Canale 5 television series Non smettere di sognare, in the part of Phil. In the summer of that year leads, Satellite DeAKids issuer, "Arriva lo Zecchino", transmission itinerant shows the auditions for the 2011 edition of the "Zecchino d'Oro".

In 2004, starred in the ad of Mineral water "Uliveto" with Alessandro Del Piero. He also starred in advertising spots for brands such as: Sky, Swisscom, Levissima, Chocapic, OroCiock, TIM, Corriere della Sera, Cebion, Proraso, Saiwa, Geox, Panini and Kinder Merendero.

=== Dubbing ===
From 1999 is entered to the "Associazione Doppiatori Attori Pubblicitari" (ADAP) (Voiced Actors Advertising Association), beginning the same year his career as a voice actor.

Besides the dubbing of many films, of course, for the roles of young people and cartoon characters, lends his voice several times and several characters, including the sparrow protagonist of the famous advertising with Alessandro Del Piero also the voice of Harry Potter in video game learned from books. In 2009, at the film festival in Viareggio Europa Cinema he won the award for the best artist.

=== Drama and musical ===
In addition to film and television actor, he performed well at the theater in some musical, after studying some of the techniques of music, including singing and music theory, guitar and harmonica blues. These studies have allowed him to also take a career in music, participating in the Castrocaro Music Festival in 2004, where he reached the semi-finals, also is a component of a new band Hard Rock Milan because he had previously taken part in another group of the same city and same kind of music the Dusty Heads (heads covered with dust) and in both has and has had the role of singer.

From 2005 until the spring of 2007 was in tour with the musical Datemi tre caravelle, directed by Gianni Quaranta, with Alessandro Preziosi, while in March 2008 part with the important leading role in the Italian stage version of High School Musical on Stage!.

Addition, Jacopo participate Disney Channel Original Series Quelli dell'intervallo, aired on Disney Channel Italy. Still working on Disney Channel made an appearance in the series "Fiore e Tinelli" (Flower and Tinelli) with his former colleagues (Matteo Leoni) playing Matthew and (Andrea Leon) playing Jason, the leader of a band in which Fiore (Francesca Calabrese) wants enter.

In 2007 appears in the music video "Grazie a te" (Thank you) the singer and colleague in Quelli dell'intervallo, (Ambra Lo Faro).

Also, for Disney, Jacopo made an appearance in the episode ("When in Rome...") the first season of the TV series The Suite Life on Deck playing (Luca Fendini), a musician Italian who met in Rome, London and fell in love.

Finally, in 2009, he released his first album 1989 and his first single from his album "È Tardi". In March 2010 released an EP Jacopo Sarno containing the single "Tommy E La Sedia Vuota", written with Nicholas Agliardi, and a selection of songs from 1989.

Despite his young age, Jacopo is also working on the humanitarian front. Since 2009 he is testimonials Change Onlu] Association.

In 2010 it published a maxi single, This Is Christmas. In 2011, he recorded a cover of "Music to Watch Girls By" Bob Crewe with Stefano Signoroni & The Muffinchasers. In the same year he signed with T.Rex Studio.

In 2013, he released another single, "Angels Till Dawn" with Mr. G and Get Far. In 2013 will be the star of the musical The Full Monty.

== Career ==
=== Theatre ===
Start year	Production	Role	Notes and awards
2004	Da Shakespeare a Dario Fo	Johan Padan	
2004	Cuore di Berlino		Teatro Verdi di Milano
2004	Romeo and Juliet	Romeo	Teatro Verdi di Milano
2005	Sogno di una notte di mezza estate	Lysander	Teatro Verdi di Milano
2005	Il borghese gentiluomo	Cléonte	
2005	Sulle tracce di Omero	Ulisse	Palazzolo Acreide
2005–2007	Datemi tre caravelle!	Diego	Gianni Quaranta's Musical
2008–2009	High School Musical on Stage!	Troy	Italian Musical Version
2013	The Full Monty	Gabriele	Italian Musical Version

=== Cinema ===
Year	Film	Role	Notes and awards
1996	Il soffitto	Giovanni	short movie
2000	Fantozzi 2000 - La clonazione	Pier Ulderico Kobram	
2010	A Natale mi sposo	Fabio Godendo	
2014	Tempi morti	executive producer	short movie
2015	Shades of Truth		
2017	Natale da chef	Lorenzo	

=== Television ===
Year	TV series	Role	Notes	
1996–1998	Io e la mamma	Paolino	sitcom	
1999	Don Luca	Mirko	sitcom	
2001	Bradipo		MTV Italy sitcom	
2001	Il mammo		sitcom	
2006	Nickelodeon Kids' Choice Awards	Host	Program	
2007–2008	Quelli dell'intervallo	Jaky	sitcom Season 6 and 7	
2007	Fiore e Tinelli	Jason	Episode Air Band	
2008–2009	Quelli dell'intervallo in vacanza	Jaky	sitcom	
2008	Pomeriggio Cinque	Himself	Canale 5 Talk show/ News program	
2009	The Suite Life on Deck	Luca Findini	Episode "When in Rome ..."	
2009	Chiamatemi Giò	Himself	sitcom 3 episodes	
2009	Life Bites - Pillole di vita	Himself	sitcom Episode Lo scoop	
2009	My Camp Rock	Himself	reality series Season 1	
2010	Quelli dell'intervallo Cafe	Jaky	sitcom	
2010	Domenica Cinque	Himself	Canale 5 Talk show/ News program	
2010	My Camp Rock	Himself	reality series Season 2	
2011	Non smettere di sognare	Filippo	TV movie	
2011	Non smettere di sognare	Filippo Fil	sitcom	
2011	Arriva lo Zecchino	Host ("Zecchino d'Oro Show")	Program	
2011	Casa Pierpiero		sitcom	
2011	2011–present	Pomeriggio Cinque	Himself	Canale 5 Talk show/ News program
2012–present	Domenica Cinque	Himself	Canale 5 Talk show/ News program	
2012–present	Pomeriggio Cinque Cronaca	Himself	Canale 5 Talk show/ News program	
2012–present	Domenica Live	Himself	Canale 5 Talk show/ News program	
2012	Arriva lo Zecchino (2nd Edition)	Host ("Zecchino d'Oro Show")	Program	

=== Dubbing ===
Year	Title	Role	Notes
1999	Star Wars: Episodio I – La minaccia fantasma	Anakin Skywalker	Voice role
1997–2002	Daria	–	Voice role
2000	Is It Fall Yet?	–	Voice role
2001	The Abrafaxe – Under The Black Flag	Brabax	Animation
2001	Harry Potter e la pietra filosofale	Harry Potter	Video game
2002	Is It College Yet?	–	Voice role
2002	Harry Potter e la camera dei segreti	Harry Potter	Video game
2002	Shooters	Skip	Voice role
2004	Tremors 4: The Legend Begins	Fu Yien Chang	Voice role
2006	Gino il Pollo perso nella Rete	Andrea/Cyber Boy	Animation
2007	Gengis Khan, il re del vento	Temugin	Voice role
2007	Mongol	–	Voice role
2008	One True Love	Mike	Voice role
2008	Due ragazzi che si amano	Paul Harrison	Voice role
2011	Elles	Thomas	Voice role
2012	Something in the Air	Rackam le Rouge	Voice role
2012	Detachment – Il distacco	Marcus	Voice role

=== Music ===
==== Songs ====
===== 2008 =====
- Non pensare più
- Tocca a me
- Wonder why
- Dimmi se sei tu
- Voglio Te, Accanto a Me feat. Ambra LoFaro (Italian version of song Right Here, Right Now from High School Musical 3: Senior Year)
- Grido (Italian version of song Scream from High School Musical 3: Senior Year)
- Non c'è confine
- Un vero amico
- Non l'avevo previsto (Italian version of song Wonder why)
- La forza del sorriso

===== 2009 =====
- Anche a primavera
- È tardi
- Sara
- Vent'anni
- Ho voglia di vederti
- Sogno te
- Non so volare
- Mai
- Jenny
- In ogni attimo
- La nuova stella
- Con te
- Senza regole

===== 2010 =====
- Tommy E La Sedia Vuota
- This is Christmas

===== 2011 =====
- C'è una favola per te feat. Lidia Schillaci
- A modo mio feat. Lidia Schillaci
- Music to Watch Girls By feat. Stefano Signoroni & The Muffinchasers

===== 2013 =====
- Angels Till Dawn feat. Mr G & Get Far
- Angels Till Dawn feat. Mr G & Get Far (Acoustic Version) with Francesca Nerozzi

===== 2014 =====
- Calypso Navidad feat. Stefano Signoroni & Sergio Múñiz

=== Discography ===
Studio albums

- 1989 (2009)

Other albums

- Pop It Rock It (2009) – Various Artist
- A Natale mi sposo (2010) – Various Artist (Soundtrack)
- Non smettere di sognare- La colonna sonora – Various Artist (Soundtrack)
- Di Radio 105 Network – Various Artist (105 Extra)
- Get Over Collection, Vol. 1 (2013) – Get Far album
- Dance on the Beach, Vol. 2 (2013) – Various Artist

Singles

- È tardi (2009)
- Ho voglia di vederti (2009)
- Vent'anni (2009)
- Tommy E La Sedia Vuota (2010)
- "This Is Christmas" (2010)
- Angels Till Dawn (2013)

EPs

- Jacopo Sarno (2010)
- Angels Till Dawn (EP) (2013)

=== Tours ===
Jacopo Sarno on September 1 performed in a minilive, with some tracks from his debut album 1989 in Meet & Green Festival.

The Jonas Brothers began their European tour on October 18, Jacopo Sarno was to open the tour in Italy. Jonas Brothers World Tour 2009 in Italy was in:

- November 3 in Milan
- November 4 in Pesaro
- November 6 in Turin

Jacopo Sarno, Finley, Lost, DARI and Broken Heart College were stars New MTV Tour. Five groups took turns on stage to give fans the best of live music from March 13, 2010. Festival had to be in:

- March 13 in Rome, PalaLottomatica
- March 14 in Milan, Mediolanum Forum
- March 20 in Mantua, PalaBam
- March 21 in Turin, Palaolimpico
- March 27 in Genoa, Vaillant Palace
- March 28 in Montichiari (BS), PalaGeorge
- April 10 in Rimini, Stadium 105
- April 11 in Bologna, Paladozza
- April 17 in Padua, Palasport
- April 18 in Florence, Nelson Mandela Forum

The MTV NEW GENERATION TOUR was delayed due to unexpected commitments of artists. The new dates will be announced soon.

==== Concerts ====
- November 10, 2010 in Savona "Forse Nevica" St. Paul's Hospital
- December 11, 2010 in Lodi
- March 27, 2011 in Savona
- June 4, 2011 in Mozzo
- July 28, 2011 in Udine
- August 12, 2011 "Rocks Back... To The Future"
- August 15, 2011 in Lama Mocogno
- September 4, 2011 in Treviso "Home Festival 2011 – Ingresso Gratuito"
- December 17, 2011 in Verona "GretArte 2011"
- April 15, 2012 "Concerto dal Vivo"
- May 11, 2012 in New York City
- May 26, 2012 in Savona
