= Pietro Ghislandi =

Italian actor (1957–2025)

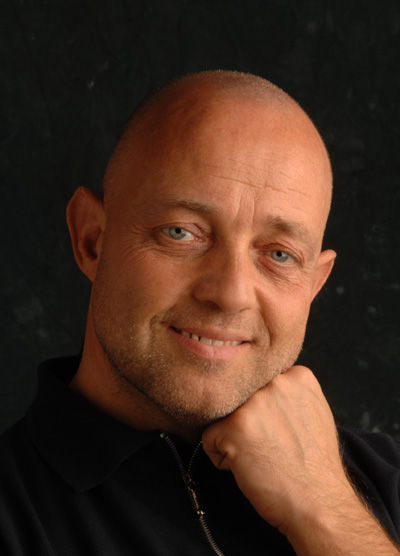
- Born: 19 April 1957; Bergamo, Italy
- Died: 3 June 2025 (aged 68); Bergamo, Italy
- Website: http://www.pietroghislandi.it

Pietro Ghislandi (19 April 1957 – 3 June 2025) was an Italian actor and ventriloquist.

== Life and career ==
Ghislandi was introduced to the public as a ventriloquist, when, with his dummy Sergio, he became a finalist in the 1986/87 edition of the RaiUno program Fantastico 7.

In 1985, Ghislandi worked as a stand-in for Renato Pozzetto in the movie È arrivato mio fratello. Immediately after, he had a small part in Grandi magazzini and performed in many commercials.

In 1987, he played a gay recruit in Soldati – 365 all’alba. Thanks to his expressive skills and surreal style of acting, Ghislandi was often asked to play roles as a character actor, working both in the cinema and on television.

As Ghislandi's career developed, he earned roles in significant films like Il muro di gomma of Marco Risi, I mitici – Colpo gobbo a Milano of Carlo Vanzina, and Vajont and Porzûs of Renzo Martinelli. He also collaborated several times with Leonardo Pieraccioni in Il principe e il pirata, Il paradiso all’improvviso and Ti amo in tutte le lingue del mondo.

Voice was an important element of Ghislandi's show "The left ventriculus", which toured throughout Italy. His impressions included the well-known cartoonist Bruno Bozzetto and the dubbing of the most famous characters of the Italian "Walt Disney".

Ghislandi was also known for his roles in two national commercials, Acqua Uliveto with Alessandro Del Piero and Caffè Kimbo with Gigi Proietti.

Ghislandi died after a long illness on 3 June 2025, at the age of 68.

== Filmography ==
- Sandwich, directed by Bruno Bozzetto (1984)
- È arrivato mio fratello, directed by Castellano e Pipolo (1985)
- Spider, directed by Bruno Bozzetto (1985)
- Grandi magazzini, directed by Castellano e Pipolo (1986)
- Soldati - 365 all'alba, directed by Marco Risi (1987)
- Piccole stelle, directed by Nicola Di Francescantonio (1988)
- Una fredda mattina di maggio, directed by Vittorio Sindoni (1990)
- I segreti professionali del Dott.Apfeldluck, directed by Alessandro Capone (1990)
- The Invisible Wall, directed by Marco Risi (1991)
- The Wicked, directed by Carlo Lizzani (1991)
- Crazy Underwear, directed by Roberto D'Agostino (1992)
- Anni 90, directed by Enrico Oldoini (1992)
- The Heroes, directed by Carlo Vanzina (1994)
- Belle al bar, directed by Alessandro Benvenuti (1994)
- Snowball, directed by Maurizio Nichetti (1995)
- Un paradiso di bugie, directed by Stefania Casini (1996)
- Luna e l'altra, directed by Maurizio Nichetti (1996)
- Porzûs, directed by Renzo Martinelli (1997)
- Frigidaire - Il film, directed by Giorgio Fabris (1998)
- Children of Hannibal, directed by Davide Ferrario (1998)
- Boom, directed by Andrea Zaccariello (1999)
- Screw Loose, directed by Ezio Greggio (1999)
- Doctor Ghiss, directed by Bruno Bozzetto (1999)
- Vajont, directed by Renzo Martinelli (2001)
- Il principe e il pirata, directed by Leonardo Pieraccioni (2001)
- Five Moons Square, directed by Renzo Martinelli (2003)
- Suddenly Paradise, directed by Leonardo Pieraccioni (2003)
- In questo mondo di ladri, directed by Carlo Vanzina (2004)
- I Love You in Every Language in the World, directed by Leonardo Pieraccioni (2005)
- I quattro aspiranti, directed by Daniele Lunghini (2005)
- Quattro quattro due, il gioco più bello del mondo, directed by Roan Occam Anthony Johnson (2006)
- Ombre, directed by Alberto Meroni (2008)
- Un'estate ai Caraibi, directed by Carlo Vanzina (2009)
- Comete com te, directed by Beppe Manzi (2010)
- Leone nel basilico, regia di Leone Pompucci (2012)
- People Who Are Well, regia di Francesco Patierno (2013)

== Television ==
- Cartoni Magici, RaiUno, directed by Sergio Tau (1984)
- Cartoni Magici, RaiUno, directed by Luigi Martelli (1985)
- Fantastico 7, RaiUno, directed by Gino Landi (1986)
- Chi tiriamo in ballo, RaiDue, directed by Roberto Poppi (1987)
- La trappola, Canale5, directed by Carlo Lizzani (1988)
- Colletti bianchi, Canale5, directed by Bruno Cortini (1988)
- Conto su di te, RaiDue, directed by Carlo Nistri (1989)
- Palmitalia 90, RTSI, directed by Mauro Regazzoni (1990)
- La Palmita, RTSI, directed by Sandro Pedrazzetti (1991)
- La Tombola, RTSI, directed by Mauro Regazzoni (1991)
- Piacere Raiuno, ReteQuattro, directed by Mimma Nocelli (1991)
- Quattro salti nel '92, ReteQuattro, directed by Egidio Romio (1992)
- Cercando cercando, RaiDue, directed by Rosario Montesanti (1995)
- Una volta al mese, Canale5, directed by Gino Landi (1997)
- Amici miei, RTSI, directed by Maristella Polli (1998)
- Io e la mamma, Canale5, directed by Fosco Gasperi (1998)
- Maurizio Costanzo Show, Canale5, directed by Paolo Pietrangeli (1998)
- Affare fatto, Canale5, directed by Luisa Alluigi (1998)
- Casa Vianello, Canale5, directed by Fosco Gasperi (1998)
- Scomparsi, Canale5, directed by Claudio Bonivento (1998)
- Nebbia in val Padana, RaiUno, directed by Felice Farina (1999)
- Casa Vianello, Canale5, directed by Fosco Gasperi (1999)
- Striscia la notizia, Canale5, directed by Roberta Bellini (2000)
- Estatissima sprint, Canale5, directed by Roberta Bellini (2000)
- Casa Vianello, Canale5, directed by Fosco Gasperi (2001)
- Speriamo che sia maschio, Canale5, directed by Giorgio Bardelli (2001)
- Don Luca, Canale5, directed by Marco Maccaferri (2002)
- Rocco, Canale5, directed by Nicolò Bongiorno (2003)
- La stagione dei delitti, RaiDue, directed by Claudio Bonivento (2003)
- La fuga degli innocenti, RaiUno, directed by Leone Pompucci (2004)
- L'avvocato, RTSI, directed by Alessandro Maccagni (2004)
- Il grande Torino, RaiUno, directed by Claudio Bonivento (2004)
- Gino Bartali, l'intramontabile, RaiUno, directed by Alberto Negrin (2005)
- Un ciclone in famiglia, Canale5, directed by Carlo Vanzina (2005)
- Nati ieri, Canale5, directed by Carmine Elia (2006)
- Spam, MTV, directed by Paolo Angelici (2007)
- Stasera mi butto, RaiUno, directed by Roberto Cenci (2008)
- Ris 5, Canale5, directed by Cristian De Mattheis (2009)
- Piloti, RaiDue, directed by Celeste Audisio (2009)
- Il sogno del maratoneta, RaiUno, directed by Leone Pompucci (2010)
- Io e Margherita, TV Studio1, regia di Silvia Arzuffi (2011)
- Il nostro amico Walter, RaiUno, regia di Enzo Monteleone (2011)
- Anita, RaiUno, regia di Claudio Bonivento (2011)

== Theater ==
- Satie e il gruppo dei Sei, directed by Giacomo De Sanctis (1980)
- I Litiganti of Racine, directed by Umberto Verdoni (1981)
- Doctor Faust of Marlow, directed by Giancarlo Valenti (1982)
- Student of Ryszard Cieslak, the actor of Grotowski (1984)
- Fantastico in tour, directed by Gino Landi (1987)
- Sconcerto, directed by Pietro Ghislandi and Roberto Frattini (1997)
- La voce interna, directed by Asta Gröting (1998)
- Prova d'orchestra with the great orchestra "Donizetti" and the pianist Lylian Zilberstein(2002)
- L'ultimo burattino directed by Rino Denti with the orchestra "Astori" (2003)
- Suonar Canzoni with Gianni Bergamelli and Gianluigi Trovesi (2005)
- Pierino e il lupo with the Orchestra Sinfonica di Lecco headed by Savino Acquaviva (2006)
- Tutti quanti voglion fare il jazz with the Latin Jazz Orchestra "Hermano Pedro" directed by Maurizio Carugno (2007)
- Masterclass con Gino Vannelli with the international singer Gino Vannelli (2007)
- John Coltrane, A Love Supreme with Gabriele Comeglio and Franco Ambrosetti (2009)
- Tre piccole suite a forma di Pierrot with Marco Remondini, Stefano Bertoli and Gianluigi Trovesi (2010)
- Pierino e il lupo with the Orchestra Sinfonica di Parma headed by Luciano Caggiati (2010)
- Un ventriloquo al circo Ospite del Circo Folloni nella tournée in Lombardia (2012)
- Scurricula Protagonista della conferenza-spettacolo per l'Università degli Studi di Bergamo nella rassegna "Orientamento, stage & placement" directed by Lorenzo Locatelli (2012)
- Il gatto con gli stivali Protagonista della favola musicale di Charles Perrault with the "Banda S. Cecilia" di Borno (BS) headed by Tomaso Fenaroli (2012)
- The jazz singer Protagonista del concerto-spettacolo con la Big Band "CDPM" di Bergamo directed by Sergio Orlandi (2013)
