= Vianello =

Vianello may refer to:

== People ==
- Edoardo Vianello (born 1938), Italian singer, composer and actor
- Fernando Vianello (1939–2009), Italian economist and academic
- Gabriele Vianello (1938–2026), Italian basketball player
- Giacomo Vianello (1947–2022), Italian footballer
- Guido Vianello (born 1994), Italian professional boxer
- Marco Vianello (born 1983), Italian footballer
- Raimondo Vianello (1922–2010), Italian actor, comedian and television presenter

== Television series ==
- Casa Vianello, Italian comedy series
- Cascina Vianello, Italian television series
- I misteri di Cascina Vianello, Italian television series

== See also ==
- Lorenzo Córdova Vianello (born 1972), Mexican political scientist and academic
