= List of Italian television series =

The following is a list of television series produced in Italy.

== # ==
- 1992
- 1993
- 1994
- 48 ore
- 7 vite

== A ==
- Adrian
- Al di là del lago
- AleX
- Le ali della vita
- All Stars
- All'ultimo minuto
- L'amica geniale
- Amiche mie
- Amico mio
- Andata e ritorno
- Andrea Bocelli 30: The Celebration
- Angelo il custode
- Anna
- Anna e i cinque
- Arriva Cristina
- Arrivano i Rossi
- Arsenio Lupin
- Le avventure di Laura Storm
- L'avvocato delle donne
- L'avvocato Porta

== B ==
- Baby
- Balliamo e cantiamo con Licia
- Bangla - La serie
- I bastardi di Pizzofalcone
- Belli dentro
- Il bello delle donne
- Belve
- Il bene e il male
- Benedetti dal Signore
- Boris
- Brian O'Brian
- Brivido Giallo
- Braccialetti rossi
- Buona la prima!
- Butta la luna
- Buttafuori

== C ==
- Caccia al Re - La narcotici
- Call center
- Call My Agent - Italia
- Camera Café
- Canzonissima
- Il Capitano
- Capri
- Carabinieri
- Caro maestro
- Carràmba! Che sorpresa
- Casa Cecilia
- Casa dolce casa
- Casa famiglia
- Casa Pierpiero
- Casa Vianello
- Cascina Vianello
- Un caso di coscienza
- Caterina e le sue figlie
- CentoVetrine
- I Cesaroni
- Che Dio ci aiuti
- Chiamatemi Giò
- Chiara e gli altri
- Un ciclone in famiglia
- I cinque del quinto piano
- Classe di ferro
- Club 57
- Codice rosso
- College
- Commesse
- Il commissario
- Un commissario a Roma
- Il commissario Corso
- Il commissario De Vincenzi
- Il commissario Manara
- Il commissario Montalbano
- Il commissario Rex
- Il commissario Ricciardi
- Compagni di scuola
- Così fan tutte
- Cotti e mangiati
- Cri Cri
- Crimini
- Crimini bianchi
- Cristina
- Cristina, l'Europa siamo noi
- Cugino & cugino
- Cuore contro cuore

== D ==
- La Dama Velata
- I delitti del cuoco
- Di4ri
- Dio vede e provvede
- Disokkupati
- Distretto di Polizia
- Don Fumino
- Don Luca
- Don Luca c'è
- Don Matteo
- Don Tonino
- Donna
- Donna detective
- Una donna per amico
- Donne assassine
- Door into Darkness
- La dottoressa Giò
- Drag Race Italia
- Due assi per un turbo
- Le due facce dell'amore
- Due per tre

== E ==
- Elisa di Rivombrosa
- Extr@

== F ==
- La famiglia Benvenuti
- Una famiglia in giallo
- Fate: The Winx Saga
- FBI - Francesco Bertolazzi investigatore
- Fedeltà
- Felipe ha gli occhi azzurri
- La figlia di Elisa - Ritorno a Rivombrosa
- Finalmente soli
- Finché c'è ditta c'è speranza
- Fiore e Tinelli
- Fratelli Benvenuti
- Fratelli detective
- Fuori corso
- Fuoriclasse

== G ==
- Gawayn
- Generation 56K
- Gente di mare
- Giallo club. Invito al poliziesco
- Giallo sera
- Gino il pollo
- Giornalisti
- Il giovane Montalbano
- Il giudice Mastrangelo
- Gli incubi di Dario Argento
- Gomorrah
- Grandi domani
- Guida astrologica per cuori infranti

== H ==
- Hip Hop Hurrà
- Ho sposato uno sbirro

== I ==
- I Cesaroni
- I-taliani
- Imma Tataranni: Deputy Prosecutor
- In tour
- Incantesimo
- Le inchieste del commissario Maigret
- Intelligence - Servizi & segreti
- InvaXön - Alieni nello spazio
- Un inviato molto speciale
- Io, Agata e tu
- Io e la mamma
- Io e mio figlio - Nuove storie per il commissario Vivaldi
- L'isola
- L'ispettore Coliandro
- L'ispettore Giusti
- Italian Restaurant

== L ==
- La ladra
- Lady Oscar
- La legge di Lidia Poët
- I leoni di Sicilia
- Liberi tutti
- I liceali
- Licia dolce Licia
- Life Bites - Pillole di vita
- Linda e il brigadiere
- Love Bugs
- Love me Licia
- Lo zio d'America
- Lucky Luke
- Lui e lei
- Luna Park

== M ==
- Ma che sera
- Ma il portiere non c'è mai?
- Mammamia!
- Il mammo
- Il maresciallo Rocca
- Max & Tux
- Medici miei
- Medicina generale
- Un medico in famiglia
- Melissa
- Milano-Roma
- I misteri di Cascina Vianello
- Il mondo è meraviglioso
- Muppet Show

== N ==
- Nati ieri
- Nebbia in Val Padana
- Nebbie e delitti
- Noi siamo angeli
- Non esiste più la mezza stagione
- Non lasciamoci più
- Non pensarci - La serie
- Non smettere di sognare
- Nonno Felice
- Norma e Felice
- NormalMan
- La nuova squadra

== O ==
- O la va, o la spacca
- Odio il Natale
- L'onore e il rispetto
- OK, il prezzo è giusto!
- Operazione N.A.S.
- Orgoglio
- L'ottavo sigillo

== P ==
- Un passo dal cielo
- Pazza famiglia
- Il peccato e la vergogna
- Persone sconosciute
- La pietra di Marco Polo
- Piloti (television series)
- La piovra (miniseries)
- Il Polpo
- Una poltrona per due
- Un prete tra noi
- Il principe azzurro
- Prisma
- Professione fantasma
- Pronto Emergenza
- Pronto, Raffaella?
- Provaci ancora prof

== Q ==
- Quei due sopra il varano
- Quelli dell'intervallo
- Quelli dell'Intervallo Cafe
- Quelli della speciale
- Questa casa non è un albergo
- Questa è la mia terra
- Qui squadra mobile

== R ==
- R.I.S. - Delitti imperfetti
- R.I.S. Roma - Delitti imperfetti
- Raccontami
- Radio G.R.E.M.
- Raffa
- Raffaella Carrà Show
- I ragazzi del muretto
- I ragazzi della 3ª C
- I ragazzi di padre Tobia
- Le ricette di Arturo e Kiwi
- Ritorna il tenente Sheridan
- Rocco Schiavone
- Rome
- Romanzo criminale - La serie
- Le rose di Danzica
- Rossella

== S ==
- Il segreto del Sahara
- Sei forte, maestro
- Sensualità a corte
- Sheridan, squadra omicidi
- Skam Italia
- I soliti idioti
- Spazio 1999
- Squadra antimafia - Palermo oggi
- La squadra
- La stagione dei delitti
- Le stagioni del cuore
- Stazione di servizio
- Il supermercato
- Sweet India
- Suburra

== T ==
- Teneramente Licia
- Tequila & Bonetti
- Terapia d'urgenza
- Terminenzio
- Terra ribelle
- The Bastards of Pizzofalcone
- Tracy e Polpetta
- Il tredicesimo apostolo - Il prescelto
- Il triangolo rosso
- Tua sorella
- Turbo
- Turno di notte
- Tutto chiede salvezza
- Tutti gli uomini sono uguali
- Tutti pazzi per amore
- Tutti per Bruno
- TuttoTotò

== U ==
- Ugo
- Una buona stagione
- Un medico in famiglia
- Un posto al sole
- Uno di noi

== V ==
- Valeria medico legale
- La vedova e il piedipiatti
- Ne vedremo delle belle
- Vento di ponente
- Via Zanardi 33
- Vicini di casa
- Il vigile urbano
- Villa Arzilla

== W ==
- Winx Club
  - World of Winx

== Z ==
- Zanzibar
- Zero
- Lo zio d'America

== Sitcoms ==
- 7 vite
- All Stars
- Andata e ritorno
- Arrivano i Rossi
- Belli dentro
- Buona la prima!
- Buttafuori
- Camera Café
- Casa dolce casa
- Casa Pierpiero
- Casa Vianello
- I Cesaroni
- Chiamatemi Giò
- Così fan tutte
- Cotti e mangiati
- Disokkupati
- Don Fumino
- Don Luca
- Don Luca c'è
- Finalmente soli
- Finché c'è ditta c'è speranza
- Fiore e Tinelli
- In tour
- Io e la mamma
- Life Bites - Pillole di vita
- Love Bugs
- Il mammo
- Max & Tux
- Medici miei
- Un medico in famiglia
- Non pensarci - La serie
- Nonno Felice
- Norma e Felice
- L'ottavo sigillo
- Papà prende moglie
- Piloti
- Professione fantasma
- Quei due sopra il varano
- Quelli dell'intervallo
- Quelli dell'Intervallo Cafe
- Radio G.R.E.M.
- Signore e signora
- I soliti idioti
- Il supermercato
- Sweet India
- Terminenzio
- Tua sorella
- Ugo
- Via Zanardi 33
- Vicini di casa
- Villa Arzilla
- Zanzibar
