= Gaetano Varcasia =

Italian actor and voice actor (1959–2014)

- Born: 6 September 1959; Rome, Italy
- Died: 10 November 2014 (aged 55); Rome, Italy
- Occupations: Actor; voice actor; theatre director
- Years active: 1983–2014

Gaetano Varcasia (6 September 1959 – 10 November 2014) was an Italian actor and voice actor.

== Biography ==
Varcasia began his career in 1983. He played key parts on stage and even served as a director. He also had minor roles as a television actor. As a voice dubber, he was the official Italian voice of Mickey Mouse from 1988 to 1995 and also dubbed characters from American television shows which include Tyrion Lannister from Game of Thrones, Carlton Banks from The Fresh Prince of Bel-Air, Ted Buckland from Scrubs, Saul Goodman from Breaking Bad and Chris Taub from House.

Varcasia was also known for dubbing characters from films. These include The Missing Link in Monsters vs. Aliens as well as TV series and The Fallen in Transformers: Revenge of the Fallen. Some of the actors Varcasia dubbed included Jackie Earle Haley, Robert Downey Jr., David Schwimmer, Peter Dinklage, Sam Lloyd, Christian Slater and many more.

== Death ==
Varcasia died in Rome of cancer on 10 November 2014, at the age of 55.

== Filmography ==
=== Cinema ===
- How the Toys Saved Christmas (1996) - voice (Mouse, white pencil, brown pencil)
- Le quattro porte del deserto (2003)
- What a Beautiful Day (2011)
- Gladiators of Rome (2012) - additional voices

=== Television ===
- Club Sandwich (1985)
- Una lepre con la faccia di bambina (1988)
- Stazione di servizio (1989)
- Il maresciallo Rocca (1996)
- Lui e lei (1999)
- San Paolo (2000)
- Carabinieri (2002)
- Camera Café (2003)
- La squadra (2006)
- Il Capo dei Capi (2007)
- Distretto di Polizia (2001–2007)
- RIS Delitti Imperfetti (2008)
- Crimini bianchi (2008)
- Spike Team - animated series (2010–2014) - voice

== Dubbing roles ==
=== Animation ===
- Mickey Mouse in All Disney Productions (1988–1995)
- The Missing Link in Monsters vs. Aliens, Monsters vs Aliens: The Series
- Tailor Smurf, King Gerald (4th voice) and Scruple in The Smurfs
- Minor characters in The Simpsons
- Uncle Henry in Legends of Oz: Dorothy's Return
- Marc Bolan in House of Rock
- Ari Folman in Waltz with Bashir

=== Live action ===
- Tyrion Lannister in Game of Thrones (seasons 1–4)
- Saul Goodman in Breaking Bad
- Carlton Banks in The Fresh Prince of Bel-Air
- Ted Buckland in Scrubs
- Phil Dunphy in Modern Family (seasons 1–5)
- Chris Taub in House
- Jesse Vasquez in Beverly Hills, 90210
- Nick George in Dirty Sexy Money
- Ronnie J. McGorvey in Little Children
- George Noyce in Shutter Island
- Willie Loomis in Dark Shadows
- Gareth Mallory in Skyfall
- Baxter in The Shaggy Dog
- The Fallen in Transformers: Revenge of the Fallen
- Paul in Pulp Fiction
- Soap in Lock, Stock and Two Smoking Barrels
- Heinrich Himmler in Downfall
- Nathan Ford in Leverage (seasons 1–4)
- Thomas Wilson in The Good Shepherd
- Peter in Death at a Funeral
- James Potter in Harry Potter and the Goblet of Fire, Harry Potter and the Deathly Hallows – Part 2
- John Druitt in Sanctuary
- Great Goblin in The Hobbit: An Unexpected Journey
- James Whistler in Prison Break

=== Video games ===
- Ghost in Destiny
