= Don Luca c'è =

- Country of origin: Italy
- No. of seasons: 1

Original release
- Release: 2008

Don Luca c'è is an Italian television series. It is the sequel of Don Luca. It was given a poor (0.5 out of 5) review by La Repubblica, and cancelled after 2 episodes.

== Cast ==
- Luca Laurenti: Don Luca
- Nora Amile: Barista
- Stefano Chiodaroli: Angelo
- Gianluca Fubelli: Crocifisso
- Valeria Graci: Laura

== See also ==
- List of Italian television series
