= Veronica Logan =

Italian film and television actress (born 1969)

- Born: 22 May 1969 (age 56); Rome, Lazio, Italy
- Other name: Veronika Logan
- Occupation: Actress

Veronica Logan (also known as Veronika Logan) is an Italian film and television actress.

== Biography ==
The daughter of the British musician Michael Logan and Antonella Desimone, she started her career working as a model. She made her acting debut in 1984, in the television series I ragazzi della valle misteriosa, directed by Marcello Aliprandi, alongside Kim Rossi Stuart. She continued with a variety of television and film productions, until the successful Canale 5 soap opera Vivere from 1999 to 2006, playing the role of Chiara Bonelli. In 1991, she played the part of the Witch and the Countess in the board game Atmosfear, episode 3 and 4. In 1991, she participated in the Jocelyn programme on Canale 5 Cos'è Cos'è?; in 1992, in well-known television programmes on RAI. She has performed in comic films such as A Spasso Nel Tempo (1996), and in romantic roles such as that in I Ragazzi Del Muretto (1991), to ambiguous roles in TV series like Strangers (1996), where she performs completely naked in love scenes with the forty-five-year-old Cherie Lunghi, up to popular TV series roles like Un medico in famiglia (1998). Her other works include the films La verità vi prego sull'amore (2001), directed by Francesco Apolloni, and Scusa ma ti chiam amore (2008), directed by Federico Moccia, besides the TV series L'ispettore Coliandro (2006- in progress). In 2013 she participated in the talent show Ballando con le stelle, conducted by Milly Carlucci, paired with the Cuban dancer Maykel Fonts: provisionally eliminated during the seventh episode of the reality, she was decisively eliminated in the next episode dedicated to the repechage.

== Filmography ==
=== Films ===
Year	Title	Role	Notes
1993	Women Don't Want To	Girl #2	Cameo appearance
1994	Sentimental Maniacs	Giusy	
1996	Uomini senza donne	Anna	
1996	Fatal Frames: Fotogrammi mortali	Rebecca	
1996	A spasso nel tempo	Michela	
1997	Last Cut - Ultimo taglio	Gloria	
2001	500!	Anna Kohler	
2001	La verità vi spiego sull'amore	Giulia	
2008	Scusa ma ti chiamo amore	Elena	
2011	Ex 2: Still Friends?	Mrs. Marangoni	
2019	Modalità aereo	Veronica Bartolini	
2024	Cortina Express	Serena	

=== Television ===
Year	Title	Role	Notes
1991	Classe di ferro	Sheila Cooper	Episode: "Una vacanza in Florida"
1991–1992	Non è la RAI	Herself / Performer	Variety show (season 1)
1993	The Young Indiana Jones Chronicles	Giulietta	Episode: "Northern Italy, June 1918"
1993	White Fang	Maggie	4 episodes
1996	I ragazzi del muretto	Giada	Episode: "Dirsi addio"
1996	Sorellina e il principe del sogno	Alisea	Television film
1998	Un medico in famiglia	Marina	Episode: "Papà dongiovanni"
1999–2006	Vivere	Chiara Bonelli	Series regular
1999	Excellent Cadavers	Secretary	Television film
2002–2003	Ugo	Ketty	Main role
2006	Camera Café	Famous actress	Episode: "Film festival"
2006–2021	L'ispettore Coliandro	Prosecutor Longhi	Main role
2008	RIS Delitti Imperfetti	Angela Berardi	Episode: "Un killer in fuga"
2008, 2011	Inspector Rex	Mariella	2 episodes
2012	Nero Wolfe	Trina	Episode: "Parassiti"
2013	Ballando con le Stelle	Herself / Contestant	Talent show (season 9)
2014	Don Matteo	Olimpia Cianti	Episode: "Scommessa perdente"
