= Sandra Mondaini =

Italian actress

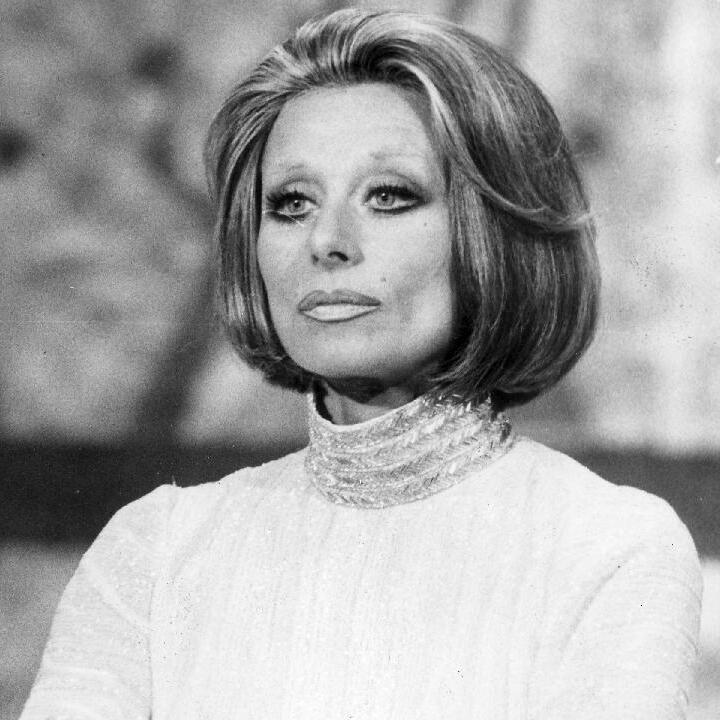
- Mondaini on the variety show Tante scuse (1974)
- Born: Alessandrina Mondaini; 1 September 1931; Milan, Kingdom of Italy
- Died: 21 September 2010 (aged 79); Milan, Italy
- Occupations: Actress; comedian; singer; television personality; radio personality
- Years active: 1953–2008
- Spouse: Raimondo Vianello (m. 1962; died 2010)
- Father: Giacinto Mondaini

Alessandrina "Sandra" Mondaini (Italian: [ˈsandra mondaˈiːni]; 1 September 1931 – 21 September 2010) was an Italian actress, comedian, singer, and television and radio presenter. She appeared in 30 films between 1953 and 2008.

Born in Milan, she was daughter of the painter Giaci and originally of Lambrate. She married actor Raimondo Vianello in 1962, and together with her husband she hosted numerous variety shows on Italian television including Tante scuse, Di nuovo tante scuse, Attenti a noi due, Sandra e Raimondo Show and Stasera niente di nuovo. Between 1988 and 2007 the couple had the leading role in the famous Italian sitcom Casa Vianello. Her last work was the television film Crociera Vianello, a spin-off from Casa Vianello.

She died at the San Raffaele Hospital in Milan at the age of 79, five months after her husband.

== Filmography ==
=== Films ===
Year	Title	Role(s)	Notes
1953	Attanasio cavallo vanesio	Soubrette	Cameo appearance
1954	Laugh! Laugh! Laugh!	Nurse in love	
1955	Il campanile d'oro	Rosetta	
1955	Io piaccio	Sandra	
1957	Susanna Whipped Cream	Marisa Trombetta	
1958	Le dritte	Rina	
1959	Noi siamo due evasi	Isabella	
1960	Caccia al marito	Ilde	
1960	Le olimpiadi dei mariti	Sandra	
1960	Un mandarino per Teo	Rosanella Ferrante	
1960	Ferragosto in bikini	Stella's owner	Cameo appearance
1961	La ragazza sotto il lenzuolo	Greta	
1961	Hercules in the Valley of Woe	Nymph Eco	
1961	Bellezze sulla spiaggia	Fiorella	
1961	Scandali al mare	Alba	
1961	Le magnifiche 7	Stefania	
1962	Gli italiani e le donne	Lilia	Segment: "L'auto garçonniere"
1963	The Shortest Day	Sicilian woman	Cameo appearance
1963	La donna degli altri è sempre più bella	Mrs. Parodi	Segment: "La natura vergine"
1963	Le motorizzate	The Investor	Segment: "Investimento sicuro"
1963	Siamo tutti pomicioni	Lidia	
1964	I maniaci	Wife	
1964	Corpse for the Lady	Marina	
1965	Questo pazzo, pazzo mondo della canzone	The Woman	
1965	Veneri in collegio	Leontine	
1966	Spiaggia libera	Maria	
1966	Mi vedrai tornare	Virginia	
1982	Sbirulino	Sbirulino	

=== Television ===
Year	Title	Role(s)	Notes
1961–1962; 1969	Canzonissima	Herself / Host	Variety show (seasons 4, 7)
1964	Biblioteca di Studio Uno	Nausica	2 episodes
1967	I tappabuchi	Herself / Co-host	Variety show
1969	La donna di cuori	Bridgette Ansara	Main role
1972	Sai che ti dico?	Herself / Co-host	Variety show
1974	Tante scuse	Herself / Co-host	Variety show
1974	Sì, vendetta…	Martolina	Episode: "Episode 3"
1978–1979	Io e la Befana	Herself / Host	Game show
1981–1982	Domenica in	Herself / Co-host	Talk show (season 6)
1984–1986	Zig Zag	Herself / Co-host	Game show
1987	Sandra e Raimondo Show	Herself / Host	Variety show
1988–1990	Il gioco dei 9	Herself / Co-host	Game show
1988–2007	Casa Vianello	Sandra Mondaini	Lead role
1994	The Simpsons	Allison Taylor (voice)	Italian voice; episode: "Lisa's Rival"
1996	Cascina Vianello	Sandra Mondaini	Lead role
1996–1997	Caro maestro	Ottilia	Main role
1997–1998	I misteri di Cascina Vianello	Sandra Mondaini	Lead role
1998	Sapore d'estate	Herself / Host	Special
2002	Miss Italia	Herself / Judge	Annual beauty contest
2004	La fattoria	Herself / Opinionist	Reality show (season 1)
2004	Sandra & Raimondo Supershow	Herself / Host	Variety show
2008	Crociera Vianello	Sandra Mondaini	Television film
