= I cinque del quinto piano =

- Created by: Umberto Simonetta
- Country of origin: Italy
- No. of seasons: 1
- No. of episodes: 95

Original release
- Network: Canale 5
- Release: 1988

I cinque del quinto piano is an Italian sitcom.

== Cast ==
- Gian Fabio Bosco as Edoardo
- Serena Cantalupi as Gisella
- Luca Sandri as Gianfilippo
- Georgia D'Ambra as Stefania
- Niccolò Della Bona as Simone
- Guia Jelo as Rosalia
- Giampiero Bianchi as Rastelli
- Aldo Ralli as Administrator
- Felice Invernici as Daniele

== See also ==
- List of Italian television series
