= Sonia Grey =

Italian actress and television presenter

- Born: Sonia Colone; 30 August 1968 (age 57); Rho, Lombardy, Italy
- Other names: Maria Michela Mari
- Occupations: Actress; television presenter
- Years active: 1988-present

Sonia Grey, known as the stage name of Sonia Colone, and Maria Michela Mari is an Italian actress and television presenter. She began her acting career in 1988 and has been performing since. Sonia Grey promotes a vegan and healthy lifestyle on her website.

== Biography ==
=== Early life ===
She was born in Rho, Lombardy on 30 August 1968. Grey received a degree in Communications Sciences, Information, and Marketing as well as a master's degree in neuro-linguistic programming.

=== Acting career ===
She began her acting career in 1988 when she performed in the show Dibattito! with Gianni Ippoliti on Italia 1. She would go on to a larger role in 1990 when Antonio Ricci chose her for the role of the first sexy nurse on Striscia la Notizia, a role subsequently filled by Angela Cavagna.

After her experience in the satirical news program on Canale 5, she participated in various comedy shows on the network Fininvest, including Sabato al circo, led by Gigi e Andrea, and Yogurt - Fermenti attivi, which would later be replicated on Happy Channel. She also participated in a number of programs as a showgirl, including Il gioco dei 9, Il TG delle vacanze, Sabato al circo, Televiggiù and Didomenica.

Colone played a small role in the film Abbronzatissimi in 1991. In 1993, she appeared alongside Gino Bramieri in the first two seasons of the sitcom Nonno Felice, playing the cashier at the bar frequented by her grandfather. In December 1995, she declared she wanted to pursue a career as a drama actress, and therefore decided to change her image and take the stage name of Maria Michela Mari, although she remained known through her first pseudonym, Sonia Grey. In 1997, she starred in Una donna in Fuga, with Gina Lollobrigida. In 1998, she starred as the main character alongside Gabriel Garko in the drama Angelo Nero, which aired on Canale 5 and Telecinco with the title El Angelo Nigro, in the early evening. She later starred in the TV movie Villa Ada with Pier Francesco Pingitore, and later became a co-star in the first two seasons of Il bello delle donne as a flower girl named Palma.

=== Return to RAI programs on television ===
Sonia returned to the Italian television under the pseudonym Sonia Grey in June 2002 during the 2002 FIFA World Cup, after giving birth. The following year, she was chosen by Michele Guardì to join the cast of Mezzogiorno in famiglia.

She later published a book, Cucina in Famiglia. The following summer she rejoined the program Unomattina Estate, this time as a presenter, alongside Franco Di Mare, where she remained for four seasons. On the same channel, Rai 1, she appeared in In forma con Sonia, and from 2005 she also presented Sabato & Domenica... la tv che fa bene alla salute, with Franco Di Mare and Dr. Fabrizio Duranti.

In 2009-2010, the program was renamed Unomattina Weekend. During the 2010–2011 season, she became the presenter of Domenica in on Rai 1 alongside Lorella Cuccarini and Massimo Giletti. In the show, Sonia Grey hosted the segment in Domenica in... Amori. In 2011, she was also one of the judges in the Rai 1 talent show Ciak... si canta! and appeared on the prime time shows Una Voce per Padre Pio and Una notte per Caruso, both broadcast on Rai 1. Since 2012, she has been a presenter on the Web TV station Nonsolobenessere.tv in collaboration with medical and psychological well-being experts.

== Personal life ==
Her interest in science, health and medicine exists in both her professional and private life. On her website, she also explains her methods for keeping fit, partially through a healthy vegan diet. She regularly practices neuro-linguistic programming, for which she also holds a Master's degree.

== Filmography ==
Credits from Sonia Grey IMDb page.

Actress

- Striscia la Notizia (TV Series) (1988)
- Classe di ferro (1991)
- Abbronzatissimi (Very Tanned) (1991)
- Dido... menica (TV Series) (1992)
- Bellezze al bagno (TV Series) (1992)
- Il gioco dei 9 (TV Series) (1992)
- Nonno Felice (Happy Grandpa) (1993)
- Una donna in fuga (TV Movie) (1996)
- Angelo Nero (Black Angel) (TV Movie) (1998)
- Villa Ada (TV Movie) (1999)
- Il bello delle donne (The Beauty of Women) TV Series (2001–2003)
- Una voce per Padre Pio - 12a edizione (TV Special) (2011)

== Works ==
as Sonia Grey

- Dibattito! (Debate!) (Italy 1, 1988)
- Televiggiù (Italy 1, 1989)
- Striscia la notizia (Strip the news) (Channel 5, 1990-1991)
- Il TG delle vacanze (The holiday news) (Channel 5, 1991)
- Sabato al circo (Saturday at the circus) (Channel 5, 1992)
- Il gioco dei giochi (The game of games) (Italy 1, 1992)
- Yogurt - Fermenti attivi (Yogurt - Active ferments) (Italy 1, 1994)
- Nonno Felice 2 (Happy Grandpa 2) (1994)
- Una donna in fuga (A woman on the run)(1996)
- Villa Ada (1999)
- Cucina in famiglia (Family cooking) with Luigi Sforzellini (2002)
- Telethon (Rai 1, 2002-2010)
- Unomattina Estate (One morning Summer) (Rai 1, 2002-2006)
- Mezzogiorno in famiglia (Midday with the family) (Rai 2, 2002-2003)
- In forma con Sonia (Fit with Sonia) (Rai 1, 2005)
- Premio Massimo Troisi (Massimo Troisi Award) (Rai 1, 2005)
- Sabato & domenica (Saturday Sunday) (Rai 1, 2005-2009)
- Il circolo virtuoso del benessere (The virtuous circle of well-being) with Dr. Fabrizio Duranti (2006)
- Concerto per i ragazzi di strada (Concert for street children) (Rai 1, 2006)
- Sabato, Domenica &...ESTATE (Saturday, Sunday & ... SUMMER) (Rai 1, 2006)
- 2007 - Le 100 regole del benessere (The 100 rules of wellbeing) with Dr. Fabrizio Duranti
- La notte dei leoni (The night of the lions) (Rai 1, 2007)
- Unomattina Weekend (One Morning Weekend) (Rai 1, 2009-2010)
- Domenica in... Amori (Sunday in ... Love) (Rai 1, 2010-2011)
- Ciak... si canta! (Ciak ... let's sing!) (Rai 1, 2011) Giurata (Sworn)
- Una notte per Caruso (One night for Caruso) (Rai 1, 2011)
- Una voce per Padre Pio (A voice for Padre Pio) (Rai 1, 2011)
