= Quei due sopra il varano =

- Genre: Sitcom
- Created by: Antonio Ricci
- Starring: Enzo Iacchetti; Lello Arena; Eleonora Cajafa; Remo Remotti
- Country of origin: Italy
- No. of seasons: 1
- No. of episodes: 20

Production
- Running time: 25 minutes

Original release
- Network: Canale 5
- Release: October 25, 1996 – March 7, 1997

Quei due sopra il varano is an Italian sitcom.

== Cast ==
- Enzo Iacchetti as Enzo Riboldazzi
- Lello Arena as Lello Cardella
- Eleonora Cajafa as Nora
- Remo Remotti as Nora's Father

== See also ==
- List of Italian television series
