= Ugo (TV series) =

- Genre: Sitcom
- Created by: Menotti
- Starring: Marco Columbro; Barbara D'Urso; Marina Rocco; Antonella Steni; Veronica Logan; Veronica Zanchi; Claudia Lawrence; Stefano Masciarelli
- Country of origin: Italy
- No. of seasons: 1
- No. of episodes: 20

Original release
- Network: Canale 5
- Release: October 20, 2002 – March 9, 2003

Ugo is an Italian television sitcom, created by Menotti and starring Marco Columbro and Barbara D'Urso.

== See also ==
- List of Italian television series
