= Max & Tux =

- Genre: Sitcom
- Starring: Massimo Lopez; Tullio Solenghi
- Country of origin: Italy
- No. of seasons: 1
- No. of episodes: 38

Production
- Running time: 5 min

Original release
- Network: Rai 1
- Release: September 2 – November 1, 2002

Max & Tux is an Italian sitcom.

== See also ==
- List of Italian television series
