= Vicini di casa =

- Created by: Gino e Michele
- Starring: Silvio Orlando, Gene Gnocchi, Enzo Cannavale, Teo Teocoli, Rossana Casale, Gabriella Golia
- Country of origin: Italy
- No. of seasons: 2

Original release
- Network: Italia 1
- Release: 1991 – 1992

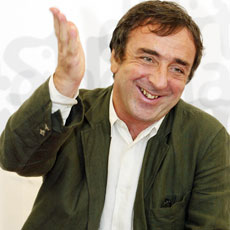
Silvio Orlando

Vicini di casa was an Italian sitcom aired on TV network Italia 1.

The comedy theme based in the everyday lives of an Italian most common melting pot, Italians of southern Italy origins (more traditional) living in a big modern city in northern Italy, namely Milan.

== Cast ==
- Silvio Orlando: Orlando Bauscia
- Teo Teocoli: Teo Bauscia
- Gene Gnocchi: Eugenio Tortelli
- Gabriella Golia: Herself
- Enzo Cannavale: Doorman

== See also ==
- List of Italian television series
