= Gene Gnocchi =

Italian comedian (born 1955)

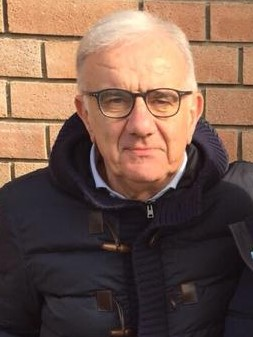
- Gnocchi in 2016

Personal information
- Full name: Eugenio Ghiozzi
- Date of birth: 1 March 1955 (age 71)
- Place of birth: Fidenza, Italy

Youth career
- 1972–1973: Alessandria

Senior career*
| Years | Team | Apps | (Gls) |
| 1973–1974 | Guastalla | | |
| 1977–1978 | Fidenza | | |
| 1980–1984 | Fiorenzuola | 30+ | (0+) |
| 1984–1985 | Castiglione | | |
| 1985–1986 | Viadana | | |
| 1986–1987 | Busseto | | |
| 1987–1988 | Vigolzone | | |
| 2007–2008 | Parma | 0 | (0) |
| 2009 | Genoa | 0 | (0) |
| 2009 | Nuova Verolese | 0 | (0) |
- * Club domestic league appearances and goals

Eugenio Ghiozzi (Italian pronunciation: [euˈdʒɛːnjo ˈɡjɔddzi]; born 1 March 1955), best known by his stage name Gene Gnocchi (Italian pronunciation: [ˈdʒɛːne ɲˈɲɔkki]), is an Italian television presenter, comedian and former footballer.

Gnocchi was born in Fidenza into a working-class family. He was an aspiring vocalist in a rock band when he was younger, and also has a legal degree; he was largely unsuccessful in both roles.

He took advice from the general public and attempted to become a comedian. He started to appear on the then unknown stage of Milan's Zelig in the 1980s, and also as an emerging comedian on the Maurizio Costanzo Show.

Gnocchi started enjoying success in the 1990s, and now is mostly known for his role in Quelli che il calcio, a Raidue football-related TV show with Simona Ventura, usually airing on Sundays.

== The football dream ==
During the 2006–07 edition of Quelli che il calcio, Gnocchi challenged the entire world of football, asking for an opportunity to play five minutes in a Serie A match. He wanted to prove that he's better than some of the overrated Serie A players, and wanted to remind everyone that at the end of the day football is only a game.

Many Italian football players encouraged this initiative, including Marcello Lippi and Alessandro Del Piero. Four teams, Atalanta, Bologna (of Serie B), Siena, and Torino in fact offered a trial to the comedian.

On 23 March 2007, at 52 years of age, he finally signed a three-month contract with Parma, his favourite Serie A team, for a yearly wage of €18,000, the minimum salary allowed in Italy for a professional footballer. He chose to wear the No. 52 shirt, referring to his age, with the name "Gnoccao", a spoof on Brazilian footballers based on his name. He was initially expected to make his debut on the day of the last league match, 27 May 2007, against Empoli. However, as Parma was still involved in the relegation battle, Gnocchi's Serie A debut did not happen. He made his debut with the Parma jersey on 31 May in a friendly match against FC Carpenedolo.

In February 2009, he signed a six-months deal with Genoa CFC.

== Private life ==
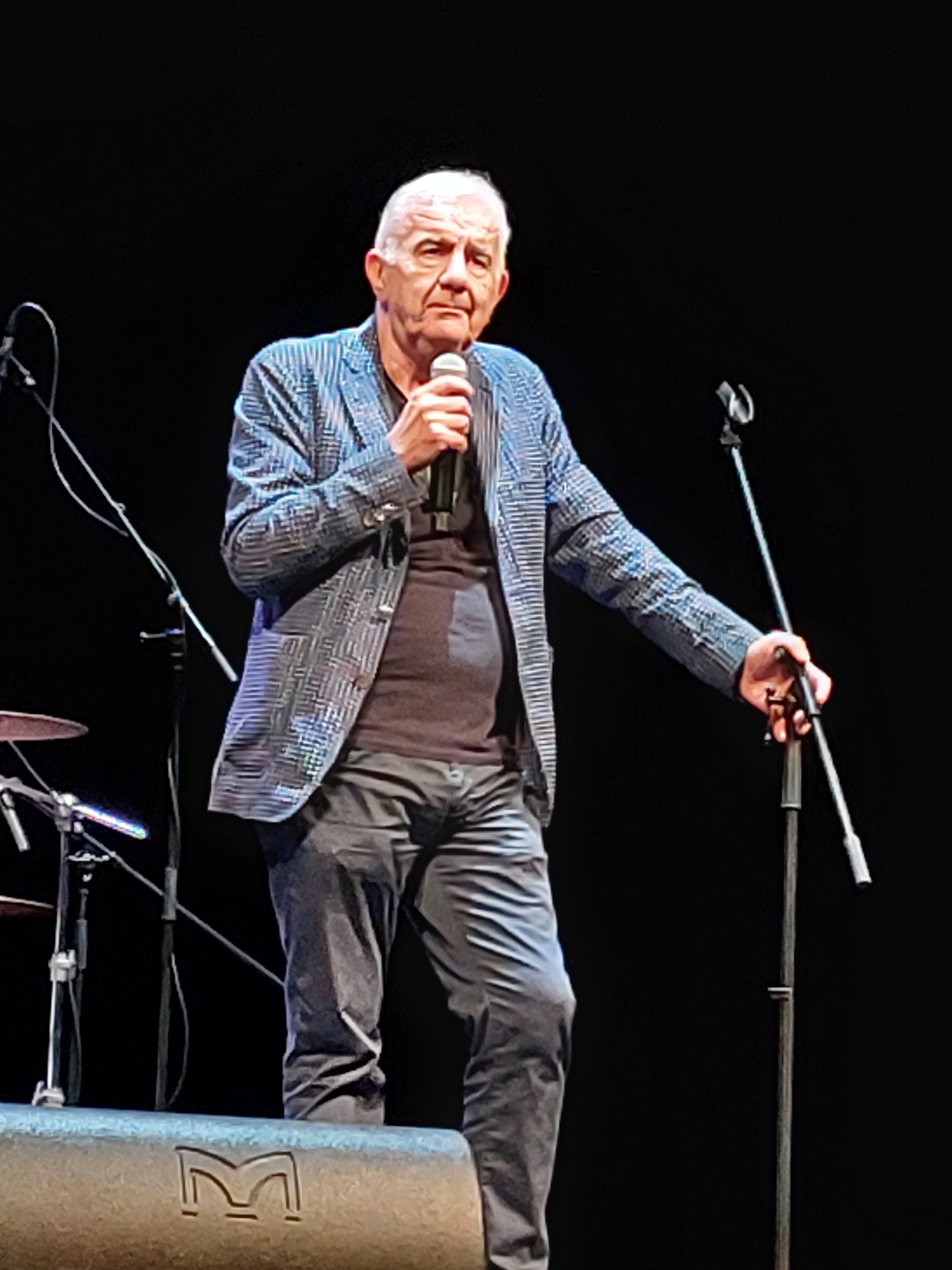
Gene Gnocchi performing Sconcerto Rock at Teatro Ponchielli, Cremona, 21 December 2023

Gene Gnocchi has been married two times and has five children (two sons and three daughters). He is an atheist.

== Filmography ==
=== Film ===
- Cuori al verde, directed by Giuseppe Piccioni (1996)
- Metalmeccanico e parrucchiera in un turbine di sesso e politica, directed by Lina Wertmüller (1996)
- Il rosso e il blu, directed by Giuseppe Piccioni (2012)

=== Television ===
- Vicini di casa (Italia 1, 1991-1992)
- Occhio di falco (Rai 1, 1996)

=== Shorts ===
- Evil Selfie, directed by Eros Bosi, Luca Alessandro, and Luigi Nappa (2016)

=== DVD ===
- Il calcio nel pallone (2004)

== Theatre ==
- Diventare Torero (1989–1990)
- Gene Gnocchi e i Desmodromici (1989–1992)
- Tutta questa struttura è suscettibile di modifica, (1995–1997)
- Santo Sannazzaro fa una roba sua, (1998–1999)
- La responsabilità civile dei bidelli durante il periodo estivo, (2000–2008)
- La constatazione amichevole nei tamponamenti tra mietitrebbie, (2002–2005)
- La neve e l'arte di scioglierla senza farla bollire, (2005–2011)
- Cose che mi sono capitate, di Gene Gnocchi, (2008–2010)
- Cose che mi sono capitate...a mia insaputa, (2010–2011)
- Cose che mi sono capitate...ancora, (2011–2017)
- Radio Gnocchi DJ set (No MTV Music Awards!), (2013–2016)
- Sconcerto Rock, (2016–2019, 2022)
- Il Procacciatore, (2017–2019)
- Se non ci pensa Dio ci penso io, (since 2021)
- Il movimento del nulla, (since 2023)
