= Hip Hop Hurrà =

- Country of origin: Italy

Original release
- Release: 2007

Hip Hop Hurrà is an Italian television series. It was broadcast on Disney Channel in 2007.

== See also ==
- List of Italian television series
