= White Fang (TV series) =

- Based on: White Fang by Jack London
- Developed by: Guy R. Mazzeo
- Starring: Jaimz Woolvett; David McIlwraith; Denise Virieux; Ken Blackburn; Lee Grant; Kevin Atkinson
- Composer: W.A. Oldfield
- Countries of origin: Canada; France; New Zealand
- Original language: English
- No. of seasons: 1
- No. of episodes: 25

Production
- Executive producers: Michael MacMillan; Guy R. Mazzeo; Thierry Caillon; Logan Brewer
- Producers: Guy R. Mazzeo; Seaton McLean; Jeff Authors
- Production locations: Arrowtown and Queenstown, New Zealand
- Cinematography: John Mahaffie
- Editors: Ken Petersen; Bruce Lange; Eric Goddard; Robin Russell
- Production companies: Neverland Studios; South Pacific Pictures; Falcon Productions; Alliance Atlantis

Original release
- Network: M6; Baton Broadcast System
- Release: September 17, 1993 – 1994

White Fang is a 1993 television series loosely based on the 1906 novel by Jack London. During its single season (1993–94) 25 episodes were produced. It tells the story of young Matt Scott who adopts a dog named Fang who continually saves him from bad situations.

== Cast and characters ==
=== Main ===
- Jaimz Woolvett as Matt Scott
- David McIlwraith as Judge Adam Scott
- Denise Virieux as Kate Scott
- Ken Blackburn as Hank Blair
- Lee Grant as Vera Dillon
- Kevin Atkinson as Chief David
- Fang as himself

=== Recurring ===
- Gianluca Venantini as Steve (4, 10, 17)
- Veronika Logan as Maggie (4, 11, 17, 19)
- Carin C. Tietze as Joanna (8, 14, 18)
- Helmut Berger as Sam Calman (9, 13, 16)

=== Guest ===
- Stig Eldred as Beauty Smith (1, 11)
- Chic Littlewood as Dog's owner
- John Cairney
- Karl Urban as David
- John Bach as Tom Cooper (6)
- David Aston as Jake (7)
- Ian Watkin as Uncle Ray (21)

== Episodes ==
No.	Title	Directed by	Written by	Original release date
1	"Coming Home"	Wayne Tourell	Guy R. Mazzeo	September 17, 1993
Matt and his dad, Judge Adam Scott, save an Alaskan Malamute named Fang from the clutches of a vicious man who uses dogs in unlawful fights. Kate, Matt's mom, tends the wounded animal. At first, Fang is left outside at night. But when Fang saves the Scott family from his evil owner (who came to steal Fang back), Fang is accepted into the family and dons a red bandana as his collar.
2	"The Birthday"	Otta Hanus	Jacqueline Lefevre and Gwen Brooks	TBA
Fang encounters a wolf near the ranch. Grandpa Scott has arrived in time to celebrate his grandson Matt's birthday. Meanwhile Adam and Kate plan a surprise party. But when Kate drives her car into a lake, Fang and the black wolf will have to save her.
3	"Tough Kid"	Otta Hanus	Jacqueline Lefevre and Paul Marston	TBA
Matt befriends Eddie at school. The youth holds a bad reputation and is a burglary suspect.
4	"Against the Current"	Jeff Authors	Jacqueline Lefevre, Jim Purdy and Kayleigh Matthew	TBA
Steve (Gianluca Venantini), a bully, challenges Matt to a fistfight and body jumping. Steve is jealous because Matt is courting Maggie (Veronika Logan). Adam is consulted on the probable construction of a mall.
5	"Last Flight"	Wayne Tourell	Jacqueline Lefevre and Glenn Norman	TBA
Jon Peters (Tony Groser) is a seasoned old pilot, nicknamed Hawkeye. One day he lands on the Scott's runway and hits it off with Matt. Peters invites the lad on a perilous flight.
6	"The Enemy Within"	Wayne Tourell	Jacqueline Lefevre and Jim Purdy; Story by : Guy R. Mazzeo	TBA
Matt gets acquainted with Tom Cooper (John Bach), a friend of Hank's, a war-torn veteran who now lives as a hermit. The neighbors suspect that this man is killing their calf so they shoot at him whenever he appears.
7	"Hostage"	Jeff Authors	Jacqueline Lefevre and Jim Purdy	TBA
Matt and Fang come upon a man asleep in the barn. He's Jake (David Aston), a pal of Hank's. Later it is learned that he's a fugitive on the lam. Upon being uncovered, Jake takes Matt hostage.
8	"Wild & Free"	Jeff Authors	Jacqueline Lefevre and Kayleigh Matthew	TBA
Matt and Fang are shocked to find a wounded mustang in the woods. The boy manages to take it home so Kate may check it out.
9	"Clint Eastwood, You're Not"	Otta Hanus	Jacqueline Lefevre, Jim Purdy and Seaton McLean	TBA
Matt is saved by a strange cowboy.
10	"The Cave"	Stefan Scaini	Jacqueline Lefevre and Yan Moore	TBA
After Judge Scott gets the chickenpox, Matt and Fang go on a camping trip by themselves and save Steve (Gianluca Venantini), who was trapped in a cave.
11	"A Matter of Trust"	John Mahaffie	Jacqueline Lefevre and Gwen Brooks	TBA
Matt decides to find out why Maggie is afraid of animals. Fang recalls his abusive master. Matt and Maggie share a kiss, which is interrupted by Fang. Enraged, Maggie runs into the woods only to be attacked by a wild hog.
12	"Up, Up and Away"	John Mahaffie	Jacqueline Lefevre and Jeff Authors	TBA
David, the sheriff, has a surprise for the Scott's. He's an airnaut and has brought a balloon to give them a ride. Fang enters the basket and the balloon turns loose leaving the husky alone in mid-air. Soon it's wild goose chase to catch Fang before he floats into the mountains.
13	"Cry Wolf"	Otta Hanus	Jacqueline Lefevre and Jim Purdy	TBA
Matt and Fang help Sam (Helmut Berger) when they learn that his property is about to be auctioned for lack of payment. Soon they come up with a plan to beat the bank and save Sam's land.
14	"Burnt River"	Jeff Authors	Jacqueline Lefevre and David Blyth	TBA
Judge Scott and Matt are fishing in the river, but when Fang goes to retrieve an astray hook, they find a slew of dead fish. Mrs. Dillon and Hank seem to be embroiled in this affair.
15	"Hit and Run"	John Mahaffie	Jacqueline Lefevre and Jeff Authors	TBA
Fang is hit by a speeding car. Kate grows concerned because of Fang's lethal wounds. The animal unconsciously recalls the accident in flashbacks, while Matt tries to find the culprit.
16	"Torn Loyalties"	Jeff Authors	Jacqueline Lefevre, Jim Purdy and Guy R. Mazzeo	TBA
Fang leads Matt to a swampland where the young man learns about Sam's dark purposes. The cowboy wants to dry out the swamps. Matt's parents oppose strongly for wildlife would be endangered. However the feud takes a dangerous turn when Kate's life is endangered.
17	"That Lovin' Feeling"	Stefan Scaini	Jacqueline Lefevre and Susan Martin	TBA
Fang encounters a lovely female dog (the black wolf from "The Birthday"). Maggie invites Matt to party. The Scott's are preparing to celebrate their wedding anniversary.
18	"Out of Range"	Jeff Authors	Jacqueline Lefevre and Christine Foster	TBA
Fang and Matt are shocked to find a dead elk. Joanna (Carin C. Tietze) helps them find the cause of this strange death. Hank and Kate suspect it could be tuberculosis, a disease dangerous for cattle.
19	"The Mine"	TBA	Jacqueline Lefevre and Glenn Norman	TBA
Matt gets in charge of a clumsy boy named Tyler (Ezra Woods), Maggie's cousin. Tyler is accident-prone and very curious. When Matt and Tyler walk through the woods, they arrive to an abandoned gold mine. Matt is soon knocked unconscious by a falling plank, while Tyler and Fang are trapped inside the mine.
20	"Arrow River"	David Blyth	Jacqueline Lefevre and Jonathan Gunson	TBA
Matt, Hank, and Fang go camping in the mountains, but things end badly when Hank falls into the river.
21	"Poachers"	Stefan Scaini	Jacqueline Lefevre and Paul Marston	TBA
Fang is fishing in a nearby river when a shot is heard. Fang then finds a fawn beside its dead mother. Fang runs to warn Matt and Kate. An illegal deer hunting has begun and David's uncle, Ray (Ian Watkin), has arrived to pay a visit. The man has brought weapons along so suspicions fall on him.
22	"Fangs for the Memories"	David Blyth	Jacqueline Lefevre and David Blyth	TBA
Kate (Jodi Hillock) recalls her childhood when she used to ride horseback along with her dad, Tom (Roy Murdoch). She's sad because of an old horse. Matt is getting ready for his trip to Calgary. Meanwhile, Fang finds a dying wolf in the woods.
23	"Big Foot"	Stefan Scaini	Jacqueline Lefevre and Kayleigh Matthew	TBA
Bigfoot's legend starts to spread like gunpowder after a taped sighting occurs in Arrowtown. A TV reporter, Jessica Barnette (Sylvia Rand) arrives to cover the event, Matt offers himself as a guide to the journalist. Judge Scott believes the story is a hoax.
24	"Fool's Gold"	John Mahaffie	Jacqueline Lefevre and Jeff Authors	TBA
Judge Scott and Fang come upon an abandoned chest in the middle of the woods. The chest contains a treasure map that intrigues them both. After days of searching they discover that it was a set-up to lure the Judge to a surprise party.
25	"Presents of Mind"	John Mahaffie	Jacqueline Lefevre, Guy R. Mazzeo and Jaimz Woolvett	1994
Matt is looking forward to give a fine present to his parents on their anniversary, but Fang spoils the surprise and delivers it un-timely. This angers Matt very much leading to an ugly situation with Fang. Afterwards, Fang runs away to stay with a pack of wolves in the mountains.

== Home releases ==
Echo Bridge Home Entertainment Alliance Home Entertainment has released the entire series on DVD in Region 1 (US and Canada) on the defunct Platinum Disc Corp. label. It was initially released in three volume sets in 2002. On December 7, 2004, they re-packaged all 3 volumes in one 3-disc set entitled White Fang. In July 2008 they were bundled together again to create "White Fang: The Complete Series", a tin box-set.
