= Una famiglia in giallo (TV series) =

- Country of origin: Italy

Una famiglia in giallo is an Italian television series.

== See also ==
- List of Italian television series
