= Le due facce dell'amore (TV series) =

- Country of origin: Italy
- Original language: Italian

Original release
- Network: Canale 5 La5
- Release: October 6, 2010 – present

Le due facce dell'amore is an Italian television series.

== See also ==
- List of Italian television series
