= Call center (TV series) =

2005 Italian television series

- Country of origin: Italy

Production
- Running time: 30 minutes

Original release
- Release: November 2005

Call center is a 2005 Italian comedy television series which aired for one season on the now defunct Happy Channel. It was aired in the last two months of the TV channel, which closed on 1 January 2006. The cast included, among others, Beatrice Luzzi, Davide Paniate, Andrea Santonastaso and Claudia Grego. The series was aired every Thursday at 21:00 in November 2005.

== See also ==
- List of Italian television series
