= Sweet India =

- Country of origin: Italy

Sweet India is an Italian television series.

== See also ==
- List of Italian television series
