= Norma e Felice =

- Country of origin: Italy
- No. of seasons: 1
- No. of episodes: 20

Original release
- Release: 1995 – 1996

Norma e Felice is an Italian sitcom. It is a spin-off of Nonno Felice.

== Cast ==
- Gino Bramieri: Nonno Felice
- Franca Valeri: Norma
- Paola Onofri: Ginevra
- Franco Oppini: Franco Malinverni

== See also ==
- List of Italian television series
