= Tracy e Polpetta =

- Created by: Giovanni Minoli and Mario Orsini
- Starring: Federica Bern and Paolo Cresta
- Country of origin: Italy
- No. of seasons: 3
- No. of episodes: 68

Production
- Running time: 15 minutes

Original release
- Network: Rai Edu
- Release: 2003 – 2008

Tracy e Polpetta (“Tracy and Polpetta”) is an Italian sitcom created to teach children English.

The protagonists are a ten-year-old English girl, Tracy, her magical talking garbage can, Bill the Bin, and the two characters who live with her and speak Italian: the mole Polpetta, and Van Ruben, the ghost of a pirate who lived in the 17th century.

Every episode deals with an important topic, such as civil coexistence, diversity, environmental protection, and education.

== See also ==
- List of Italian television series
