= Il bello delle donne =

- Genre: Comedy-drama; Romantic comedy
- Starring: Stefania Sandrelli; Nancy Brilli; Virna Lisi; Antonella Ponziani; Massimo Bellinzoni; Giuliana De Sio; Lunetta Savino; Caterina Vertova; Gabriel Garko; Eva Grimaldi; Tereza Zaijcova; Azzurra Antonacci; Sonia Grey; Nicole Grimaudo; Patricia Millardet; Maria Grazia Cucinotta; Ida Di Benedetto; Loredana Cannata; Ginevra Colonna; Eva Robin's; Giusi Cataldo; Francesca Nunzi
- Country of origin: Italy
- No. of seasons: 3
- No. of episodes: 36

Original release
- Network: Canale 5
- Release: March 7, 2001 – November 27, 2003

Il bello delle donne is an Italian comedy-drama television series that follows the lives of different Italian women. The series was broadcast on the Canale 5 Italian TV channel starting on 7 March 2001 until 27 November 2003.

== The TV series ==
Every season is composed of twelve episodes (each of them represents one month of the year) and they all have a different protagonist. The time frame covered by the first season is that of a working year (from September to August), while in the following two seasons it corresponds to the solar year (from January to December).

The closing theme song of the third season is Noi, le donne noi by Ornella Vanoni featuring Nancy Brilli.

In 2017 a spin-off of the series titled Il bello delle donne... alcuni anni dopo was broadcast.

== Main cast ==
- Stefania Sandrelli: Anna Borsi
- Nancy Brilli: Vicky Melzi (1ª e 3ª Seasons)
- Giuliana De Sio: Annalisa Bottelli Renzi Di Balsano
- Lunetta Savino: Agnese Astuti Borsi (1ª e 2ª Seasons)
- Antonella Ponziani: Francesca Cialdi
- Caterina Vertova: Olga Astuti De Contris (1ª Season)
- Virna Lisi: Contessa Miranda Spadoni
- Eva Grimaldi: Elfride De Contris
- Nicole Grimaudo: Tina (1ª Season)
- Gabriel Garko: Roberto Bobo De Contris
- Massimo Bellinzoni: Luca Manfridi
- Manuela Arcuri: (4ª Season)
- Urbano Barberini: Andrè Renzi
- Damiano Andriano: Felicetto
- Stefano Davanzati: Alfio Barba
- Pier Maria Cecchini: Cirino Borsi (1ª e 2ª Seasons)
- Maria Michela Mari: Palma Colombo-Verdesca
- Felice Andreasi: Giovanni Cozza
- Pier Paolo Capponi: Conte Pietro Spadoni
- Barbara Di Bartolo: Ludovica Spadoni
- Philippe Caroit: Aldo
- Fabio Fulco: Milko
- Raffaele Buranelli: Giulio Trevi
- Gippy Soprani: Clorinda Contegno
- Elisabetta Rocchetti: Celeste
- Antonio Giuliani: Gianni Bianco
- Manuele Labate: Walter Bassetti
- Ida Di Benedetto: Esmeralda De Santis
- Maria Grazia Cucinotta: Rosy Fumo
- Patricia Millardet: Angelina Brusa (2ª e 3ª Seasons)
- Anita Ekberg: Ingrid
- Eva Robin's: Pola
- Loredana Cannata: Elena Parodi
- Ginevra Colonna: Irma Parodi
- Martine Brochard: Baronessa Tonia Turati
- Isabella Orsini: Saveria
- Pino Micol: Otto Di Balsano
- Daniele Pecci: Edoardo Di Balsano
- Cesare Bocci: Dario Di Balsano
- Florence Guérin: Lilletta Di Balsano
- Pino Colizzi: Gabriele De Contris
- Roberto Posse: Gualtiero Parodi
- Emanuela Garuccio: Fanny
- Georgia Luzi: Mavi
- Vincenzo Peluso: Tony
- Edoardo Leo: Ivan
- Giusi Cataldo: Laura Del Bono
- Michèle Mercier: Noemi Del Bono
- Rossella Falk: Nina
- Francesca D'Aloja: Luna Tamberlani
- Francesca Nunzi: Fiorenza
- Laura Troschel: Myrtis Giovannelli

== See also ==
- List of Italian television series
