= I viaggiatori della sera =

- Directed by: Ugo Tognazzi
- Written by: Ugo Tognazzi; Sandro Parenzo
- Produced by: Franco Committeri
- Starring: Ugo Tognazzi; Ornella Vanoni; Corinne Cléry
- Cinematography: Ennio Guarnieri
- Edited by: Nino Baragli
- Music by: Xavier Battles; Toti Soler
- Release date: 1979
- Running time: 130 minutes
- Countries: Italy; Spain

I viaggiatori della sera ('The Evening Travellers') is a 1979 science fiction-drama film written and directed by Ugo Tognazzi. A co-production between Italy and Spain, it is loosely based on a novel with the same name by Umberto Simonetta.

== Synopsis ==
In an alternative 1980 future, recently approved laws mandate that everybody must retire and move into state-run vacation villages upon reaching their 50th birthday. Here, although provided with free food, alcohol, entertainment and all perks of a promiscuous life style, the guests are effectively prisoners who get progressively decimated, by winning a "cruise" from which there is no return.

The movie follows the experience of a couple forced into the new reality, under pressure of their own sons and society as a whole. Although initially rebellious, they progressively give in, and will both die within some weeks in the village. Their sons are relatively at ease with the new system, which is in turn embraced unquestionably by their own child.

== Cast ==
- Ugo Tognazzi as Orso
- Ornella Vanoni as Nicki
- Corinne Cléry as Ortensia
- Roberta Paladini as Anna Maria
- Pietro Brambilla as Francesco
- José Luis López Vázquez as Simoncini
- William Berger as Cochi Fontana
- Manuel de Blas as Bertani
- Deddi Savagnone as Mila
- Leonardo Benvenuti as Zafferi

== Production ==
Initially, Nino Manfredi, who had just worked with Tognazzi in The Payoff, was attached to the project as both screenwriter and actor. After participating in several writing sessions, however, he withdrew from the project, much to Tognazzi's dismay.
