= Non pensarci – La serie =

- Genre: Comedy
- Created by: Gianni Zanasi
- Starring: Valerio Mastandrea; Giuseppe Battiston; Anita Caprioli; Teco Celio; Anna Ferzetti; Gisella Burinato; Luciana Littizzetto
- Country of origin: Italy
- No. of seasons: 1
- No. of episodes: 13

Production
- Running time: 30 min.

Original release
- Network: Fox
- Release: May 18 – July 20, 2009

Non pensarci – La serie is an Italian comedy television series.

== See also ==
- List of Italian television series
