= AleX =

1997 Italian television series

- Genre: Mystery
- Created by: Alfredo Castelli; Guglielmo Duccoli; Giorgio Schöttler
- Starring: Romina Mondello; Carlo Rivolta
- Country of origin: Italy
- No. of seasons: 1
- No. of episodes: 6

Original release
- Network: Italia 1
- Release: 20 March – 12 June 1997

AleX is an Italian mystery television series created by Alfredo Castelli, Guglielmo Duccoli, and Giorgio Schottler, and produced by Videotime.

== See also ==
- List of Italian television series
