= Antonio Ricci (TV producer) =

Italian television writer and showrunner (born 1950)

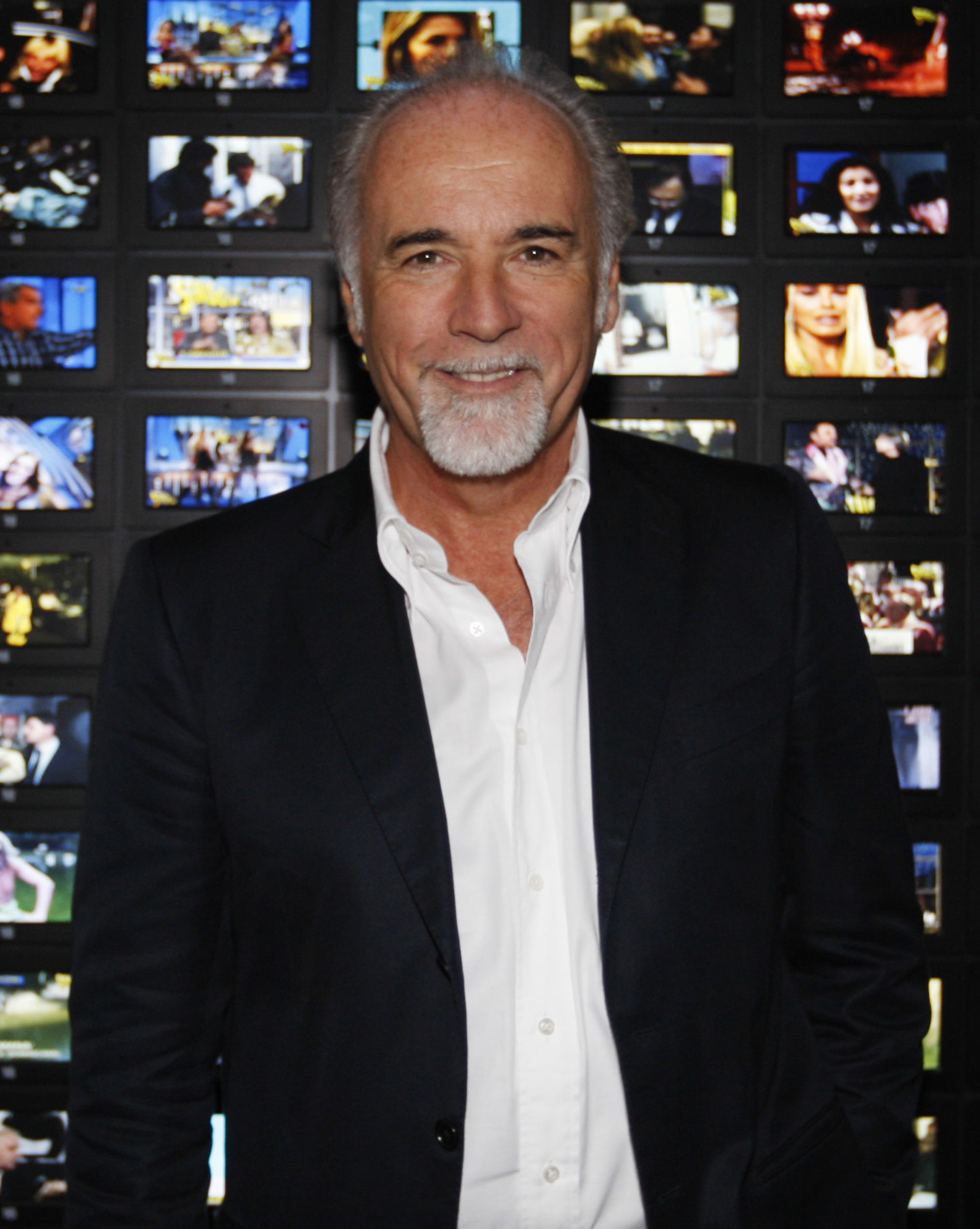
Ricci in 2017

Antonio Ricci (born 27 June 1949) is an Italian television writer and showrunner.

== Biography ==
Antonio Ricci was born in Albenga, in the Italian province of Savona, on 26 June 1950. A literature graduate, he created many TV shows for RAI, the Italian national public broadcasting company, and Mediaset, the largest commercial broadcaster in the country. At 29 years old, he was one of the writers of the Saturday prime-time TV show Fantastico (Raiuno, 1979, 1981 and 1982). Since then, he started an artistic collaboration with Beppe Grillo that continued with the TV shows Te la do io l'America (1981) and Te lo do io il Brasile (1984).

In 1983 he started working for Mediaset and created Drive In, a comical-satirical variety show on air till 1988. Among the other TV shows developed by Ricci, the ones that stand out are Lupo Solitario (1987), the controversial Matrjoska, at first censored and then produced again in 1988 with the title L'araba fenice, with the same set up and the same cast as the previous show. In 1988 Ricci wrote the show Odiens and in the same year he created Striscia la notizia, a satirical TV program. Since 1990, Ricci has produced the TV show Paperissima.

In 1999 he taught three television classes as a guest lecturer at the Sorbonne University. Ricci also created TV shows that aired during the summer months such as: Veline (2002, 2004, 2008 and 2012), Velone (2003 e 2010), Cultura moderna (2006, 2007 and 2016). In 2009 Ricci created the TV program Le nuove mostre (a spin-off of a section of Striscia la notizia, hosted by the veline Costanza Caracciolo e Federica Nargi).

Ricci also wrote the screenplay of the movie Cercasi Gesù (1982), directed by Luigi Comencini, which stars Beppe Grillo, Maria Schneider and Fernando Rey and received a David di Donatello and two Nastri d'Argento awards. In 2006 he and his wife Silvia Arnaud helped save Villa della Pergola and its gardens, situated in Alassio, from property speculation. The Park of Villa della Pergola, created in the late 1870's, is a unique example of an Anglo-Mediterranean park that has preserved its original size. In 1906, the park gained such universal fame and admiration that William Scott described it in his book The Riviera as "one of the marvels of the Riviera". Since May 2012 the park has been opened to the public in collaboration with FAI (Fondo Ambiente Italiano).

== Personal life ==
Anotonio Ricci is married to Silvia Arnaud, an art historian, and has three daughters. He is an atheist.

== Awards ==
Since 1980 Antonio Ricci received 29 Telegatto awards and 33 Oscar TV awards (included the diamond one for Striscia la notizia 20th anniversary). On November 29, 2017, he received a special Telegatto, the 30th, when Striscia celebrated its 30th anniversary.

- 1987 – Palma d'oro at Salone Internazionale dell'Umorismo di Bordighera
- 1994 – Maschera d'argento
- 1995 – Premio Internazionale Ennio Flaiano
- 1999 – Premiolino
- 2003 – È Giornalismo
- 2007 – Premio Satira Politica
- 2007 – Fionda di Legno
- 2007 – Ambrogino d'oro
- 2008 – Premio La Ginestra
- 2008 – Premio Nazionale Pannunzio
- 2009 – Premio Nazionale Arycanda
- 2010 – Chi è chi Award
- 2011 – Premio Margutta
- 2011 – Premio Giornalistico Cinque Terre
- 2011 – Medaglia della Presidenza della Repubblica
- 2011 – Targa Shomano 2011
- 2011 – Premio speciale del Presidente della Repubblica
- 2013 – Premio Città di Osimo "Italiani con la testa"
- 2014 – Premio Scannio per l'Ambiente
- 2015 – Premio Santa Chiara
- 2016 – Premio alla carriera at Video Festival di Imperia
- 2016 – Premio Visioni at Festival ANTICOntemporaneo di Cassino
- 2018 – Emys Award
- 2018 – Premio Speciale "L’Italia che comunica tra le stelle"

== Television ==
- Fantastico (Rai 1, 1979-1980)
- Te la do io l'America (Rai 1, 1980)
- Hello Goggi (Canale 5, 1981)
- Fantastico 2 (Rai 1, 1981-1982)
- Orrore: Sabani o della crisi di identità (Rai 3, 1982)
- Fantastico 3 (Rai 1, 1982-1983)
- Il Grillo Parlante (Elefante TV, 1982)
- Buone notizie - on Domenica in (Rai 1, 1983)
- Drive In (Italia 1, 1983-1988)
- Te lo do io il Brasile (Rai 1, 1984)
- Lupo Solitario (Italia 1, 1987)
- Matrjoska (Italia 1, 1988)
- L'araba fenice (Italia 1, 1988)
- Odiens (Canale 5, 1988-1989)
- Striscia la notizia (Italia 1, 1988; Canale 5, since 1989)
- Paperissima (Italia 1, 1990-1991; Canale 5, 1990-2006, 2008, 2010-2011, 2013)
- Paperissima Sprint (Italia 1, 1990; Canale 5, 1995, 1997, 1999, 2001, 2003, 2005, 2007-2009, since 2011)
- Free dog: fantastico Trapani (Rai 2, 1990)
- Drive In Story (Italia 1, 1990-1992)
- Natale in Casa Gabibbo (Canale 5, 1990)
- Mondo Gabibbo (Canale 5, 1991)
- Estatissima Sprint (Canale 5, 1996, 2000)
- Quei due sopra il varano (Canale 5, 1996)
- Doppio lustro (Canale 5, 1998)
- Veline (Canale 5, 2002, 2004, 2008, 2012)
- Velone (Canale 5, 2003, 2010)
- Cultura moderna (Canale 5, 2006-2007, Italia 1, 2016-2017)
- Striscia la domenica (Canale 5, 2009-2013)
- Le nuove mostre (La 5, 2010-2011)
- Giass (Canale 5, 2014)

== Filmography ==
- Cercasi Gesù (1982)

== Radio ==
- Grillo e il professore (1980) on RMC

== Books ==
- Ricci, Antonio (1998). Striscia la tivù (in Italian). Turin: Einaudi. ISBN 88-06-15042-1.
- Ricci, Antonio (2017). Me tapiro (in Italian). Milan: Mondadori. ISBN 978-88-04-67955-4.
