= Gli incubi di Dario Argento =

- Created by: Dario Argento
- Country of origin: Italy
- No. of seasons: 1
- No. of episodes: 9

Production
- Running time: 3 mins (episode)

Original release
- Network: RAI
- Release: 1987

Gli incubi di Dario Argento is a television series created and directed by Dario Argento, as part of Giallo Argento, a segment of RAI television show Giallo, hosted by Enzo Tortora.

It consists of nine episodes, which were shot in 35 mm, each one having a duration of about three minutes. Among various episodes, Nostalgia Punk has emerged following the criticism raised by the audience after it was broadcast, due to the violent scenes, and led the RAI management to issue a public reprimand to Argento and the show. The series was screened in several festivals, including at the 2014 Locarno Film Festival.

== Episodes ==
- La finestra sul cortile (The window on the court)
- Riti notturni (Night rituals)
- Il Verme (The worm)
- Amare e morire (Loving and dying)
- Nostalgia punk
- La Strega (The witch)
- Addormentarsi (Falling asleep)
- Sammy
- L'incubo di chi voleva interpretare “l'incubo” di Dario Argento (The nightmare of the one who wished to explain Dario Argento's “nightmare”)

== See also ==
- List of Italian television series
