= Quelli dell'intervallo =

Italian television series

- Genre: Sitcom
- Country of origin: Italy
- Original language: Italian
- No. of seasons: 7
- No. of episodes: 341

Production
- Running time: 5–7 minutes
- Production company: Grundy Productions Italy

Original release
- Network: Disney Channel Italy
- Release: 4 September 2005 – 26 December 2008

Quelli dell'intervallo (lit. 'Those of Recess') is an Italian sitcom produced by Disney Channel Italy. The show focuses on kids as they chat and get into unexpected situations while at a window in their school.

After Disney's success with the show, the idea was replicated throughout continental Europe, and eventually Asia, Australia, and the United States. In total, fourteen different shows have spun off from Quelli dell'intervallo.

The show finally ended in 2009, with Quelli dell'intervallo – In Vacanza, as the kids finish primary school and are about to go to high school.

The series spawned three spin-offs: Quelli dell'Intervallo Cafe, where the protagonists have gone to different high schools, and the only place where they can still be together is in a cafe, Fiore e Tinelli, starring Tinelli (Matteo Leoni), one of the main and most popular characters of the series, and his neighbour Fiore (Francesca Calabrese), and Casa Pierpiero, that follows young Pierpiero (Federico Mezzottoni), a rich boy who falls in love with a goth girl.

== Characters ==
- Tinelli – Matteo Leoni
- Valentina – Giulia Boverio
- Dred – Mattia Rovatti
- Secchia – Marc Tainon
- Mafalda "Mafy" – Ambra Lo Faro
- Annina – Andrea Leoni
- Nico - Romolo Guerreri
- Dj – Diana Chihade
- Smilzo – Alessandro Vivian
- Jaky – Jacopo Sarno
- Rudy – Valentina Ghelfi
- Isabella "Bella" – Clara Tarozzo
- Tommy – Giulio Rubinelli
- Spiffy – Edoardo Baietti
- Rocky – Elisabetta Miracoli
- Spy – Alvaro Caleca
- Mrs. Martinelli – Clelia Piscitello
- The dean – Giovanni Battezzato

== See also ==
- As the Bell Rings
