= Arrivano i Rossi =

- Genre: Sitcom
- Created by: Fatma Ruffini
- Starring: Mauro Pirovano; Orlando Valente; Barbara Scoppa; Laura Chiatti
- Country of origin: Italy
- No. of seasons: 1
- No. of episodes: 37

Production
- Running time: 23 min.

Original release
- Network: Italia 1
- Release: April 7 – April 17, 2003

Arrivano i Rossi is an Italian television series that is both a sitcom and Reality Television. It is based on the concept of a (pretence) family who invites a 'victim' into their home, which is full of hidden cameras. It started airing in 2003 on Italia 1.

== See also ==
- List of Italian television series
