= La pietra di Marco Polo =

- Directed by: Aldo Lado
- Theme music composer: Pino Donaggio
- Country of origin: Italy
- No. of seasons: 2
- No. of episodes: 26

Original release
- Network: Rai 2
- Release: 1982 – 1983

La pietra di Marco Polo is an Italian children's adventure television series set in Venice. It was produced by RAI.

== See also ==
- List of Italian television series
