= O la va, o la spacca =

- Country of origin: Italy

O la va, o la spacca is an Italian television series.

== See also ==
- List of Italian television series
