= I misteri di Cascina Vianello =

- Genre: Comedy; Mystery
- Created by: Gianfrancesco Lazotti
- Starring: Raimondo Vianello; Sandra Mondaini; Giorgia Trasselli; Ugo Conti; Andrea Roncato
- Country of origin: Italy
- No. of seasons: 1
- No. of episodes: 5

Production
- Running time: 90 minutes

Original release
- Network: Canale 5
- Release: December 21, 1997 – January 18, 1998

I misteri di Casa Vianello is an Italian comedy television series produced by Mediaset.

== See also ==
- List of Italian television series
