= Finché c'è ditta c'è speranza =

- Country of origin: Italy
- Original language: Italian

Original release
- Network: Canale 5
- Release: January 3, 1999 – January 11, 2003

Finché c'è ditta c'è speranza is an Italian television series.

== See also ==
- List of Italian television series
