= Buona la prima! =

Italian Show

- Country of origin: Italy
- Original language: Italian

Original release
- Network: Italia 1
- Release: April 17, 2007 – September 4, 2009

Buona la prima! is an Italian television series based on the format Schillerstraße.

== See also ==
- List of Italian television series
