= Casa dolce casa =

- Country of origin: Italy
- Original language: Italian
- No. of seasons: 3

Original release
- Network: Canale 5
- Release: 1992 – 1994

Casa dolce casa (Home sweet home) is an Italian sitcom.

== Cast ==
- Gianfranco D'Angelo: Marco Bonetti
- Alida Chelli: Sofia
- Daniela D'Angelo: Chiara Bonetti
- Oreste Di Domenico: Giulio Bonetti
- Enzo Garinei: Pietro
- Wendy Windham: Julie

== See also ==
- List of Italian television series

== Recording studios ==
The series was filmed in the Link Up Studies in Milan.
