= Le avventure di Laura Storm =

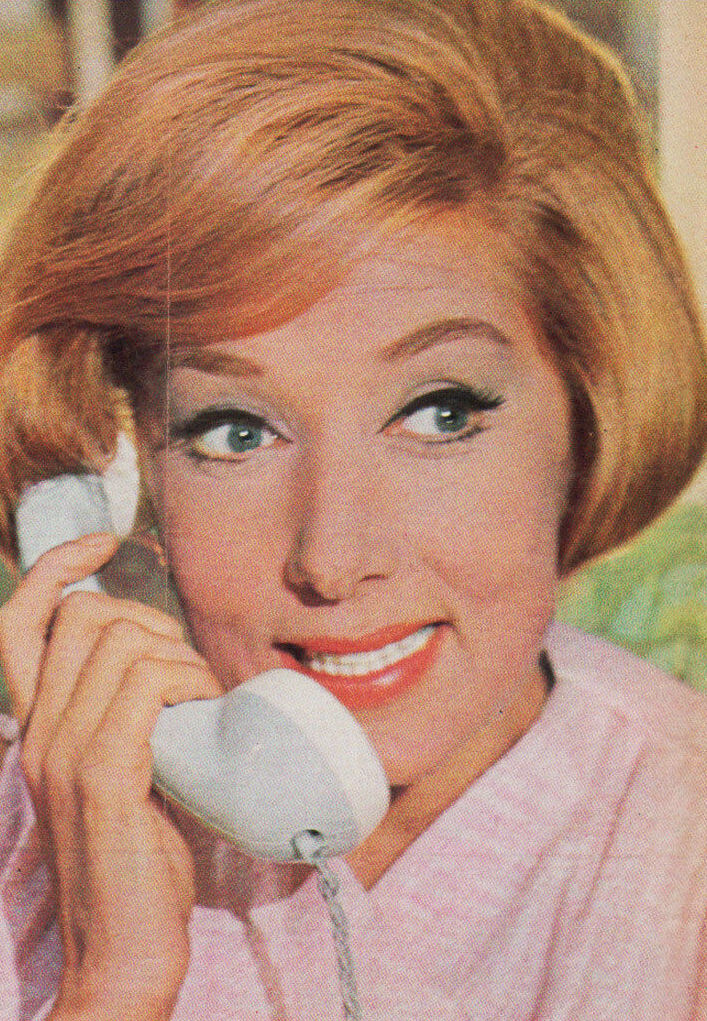
- Lauretta Masiero as Laura Storm
- Created by: Leo Chiosso; Camillo Mastrocinque
- Starring: Lauretta Masiero (Laura Perruchetti alias Laura Storm); Aldo Giuffrè
- Ending theme: Ancora una volta pericolosamente (Johnny Dorelli Leo Chiosso Fausto Leali)
- Country of origin: Italy
- No. of seasons: 2
- No. of episodes: 9

Original release
- Network: Programma Nazionale
- Release: August 11, 1965 – September 18, 1966

Le avventure di Laura Storm (1965) is an Italian television series, starring Lauretta Masiero and Aldo Giuffrè.

== See also ==
- List of Italian television series
