= Sheridan, squadra omicidi =

- Country of origin: Italy
- No. of seasons: 1
- No. of episodes: 5

Original release
- Network: Secondo Programma
- Release: October 13 – November 10, 1967

Sheridan, squadra omicidi is an Italian television series.

== See also ==
- List of Italian television series
