= Don Fumino =

- Country of origin: Italy
- No. of seasons: 1
- No. of episodes: 26

Original release
- Network: Raiuno
- Release: 1993 – 1993

Don Fumino is an Italian sitcom.

== Cast ==
- Renzo Montagnani: Don Fumino
- Pippo Santonastaso: De Lollis
- Isa Gallinelli: Bianca
- Luisa Rovati: Valentina
- Luisella Boni: The Countess

== See also ==
- List of Italian television series
