= Umberto Simonetta =

Italian playwright, writer and lyricist

- Simonetta in 1984
- Born: 4 April 1926; Milan, Italy
- Died: 25 August 1998 (aged 72); Milan, Italy
- Occupations: Playwright, writer, lyricist

Umberto Simonetta (4 April 1926 – 25 August 1998) was an Italian playwright, writer and lyricist. He was described as "an unclassifiable artist" and "a wanderer between different genres".

Born in Milan, Simonetta grew up in Switzerland where his father had been forced to move as an anti-fascist.

He started his career working in couple with Guglielmo Zucconi as a radio writer and a playwright. He wrote several novels, some of them adapted into films such as Normal Young Man by Dino Risi and I viaggiatori della sera by Ugo Tognazzi. He directed the Teatro Gerolamo in Milan from 1979 until its close in 1983. As a lyricist, he often collaborated with Giorgio Gaber.

In his later years Simonetta collaborated with the newspaper Il Giornale as a theatrical critic and was one of the screenwriters of the sitcom Nonno Felice. He died of tumor.
