= Buttafuori =

- Genre: Sitcom
- Created by: Giacomo Ciarrapico
- Starring: Valerio Mastandrea; Marco Giallini
- Country of origin: Italy
- No. of seasons: 1
- No. of episodes: 8

Production
- Running time: 30 min.

Original release
- Network: Rai 3
- Release: July 21 – September 8, 2006

Buttafuori is an Italian sitcom starring Valerio Mastandrea and Marco Giallini.

== Cast ==
- Valerio Mastandrea: Cianca
- Marco Giallini: Sergej

== See also ==
- List of Italian television series
