= Il supermercato =

- Created by: Giorgio Bardelli
- Starring: Enrico Bertolino; Angela Finocchiaro; Vincenzo Messina; Lavinia Longhi; Mimmo Chianese
- Country of origin: Italy
- No. of seasons: 1
- No. of episodes: 19

Il supermercato is an Italian comedy television series.

== See also ==
- List of Italian television series
