= Villa Arzilla =

Italian sitcom

- Directed by: Gigi Proietti
- Country of origin: Italy
- No. of seasons: 1
- No. of episodes: 20

Original release
- Network: Rai 2
- Release: 1990

Villa Arzilla is an Italian sitcom.

== Cast ==
- Caterina Boratto: Vittoria Gransasso
- Marisa Merlini: La direttrice
- Fiorenzo Fiorentini: Castorani l'antiquario
- Giustino Durano: Gastone
- Ernesto Calindri: Il generale Vezio Vezi
- Mirella Falco: Nonna Coraggio
- Elio Crovetto: Chef
- Carlo Molfese: Ragionier Pantalla
- Salvatore Marino: Gazebo
- Paola Giannetti: Peppa
- Giorgio Tirabassi: Vinicio
- Yvonne Sciò: Carmen
- Valeria Sabel: Irina
- Elena Presti: Isabella
- Giorgio Tirabassi: Barman
- Jonis Bascir: friend of Gazebo
- Gigi Proietti: The Gardener

== See also ==
- List of Italian television series
