= Normal Young Man =

- Directed by: Dino Risi
- Edited by: Alberto Gallitti
- Music by: Armando Trovajoli
- Release date: 1969
- Country: Italy
- Language: Italian

Normal Young Man (Italian: Il giovane normale) is a 1969 Italian comedy film directed by Dino Risi.

It is based on the novel with the same name written by Umberto Simonetta.

== Cast ==
- Lino Capolicchio: Giordano
- Janet Agren: Diana
- Eugene Walter: Nelson
- Jeff Morrow: Professor Sid
- Umberto D'Orsi: Un automobilista
- Claudio Trionfi: Mariolino
- Pippo Franco: Claudio
- Dana Ghia: La professoressa
- Gino Santercole: Giorgio
