= Turbo (TV series) =

- Country of origin: Italy

Turbo is an Italian television series.

== See also ==
- List of Italian television series
