= Ma il portiere non c'è mai? =

- Country of origin: Italy

Ma il portiere non c'è mai? is an Italian television series.

== See also ==
- List of Italian television series
