= Fuori corso =

Italian television series

- Created by: Vincenzo Coppola
- Starring: Ciro Ceruti and Ciro Villano
- Country of origin: Italy
- No. of seasons: 6

Production
- Running time: 35 minutes

Original release
- Network: Canale 9
- Release: 2002 – 2014

Fuori corso (also known in English as Off Course) is an Italian television sitcom that was written by Vincenzo Coppola, Ciro Ceruti and Ciro Villano. Ceruti and Villano star in the comedy as cousins Cosimo and Damiano.

It aired on Canale 9 from 2002 to 2014 and was produced by Teleoggi S.r.l.

== Season 1 ==
Cosmas and Damian are cousins, the boyfriends of two sisters, Alfina and Alfonsina. They are controlled by their brother, a priest. Over time they become acquainted with Rosario, a Spanish girl living in Italy to study, who pretends to be timid.

The episodes were nothing more than tests, rough versions of what was shown in the later seasons. It was a pilot season to test the show. Ceruti said the first approach of Canale 9 in proposing a sitcom was always to test the show.

== See also ==
- List of Italian television series
