= Pronto Emergenza =

- Country of origin: Italy

Pronto Emergenza is an Italian television series.

== See also ==
- List of Italian television series
