= InvaXön – Alieni nello spazio =

- Country of origin: Italy
- Original language: Italian

Original release
- Release: April 1, 2007 – present

InvaXön – Alieni nello spazio is an Italian television series.

== See also ==
- List of Italian television series
