= I ragazzi di padre Tobia =

- Country of origin: Italy
- No. of seasons: 3
- No. of episodes: 14

Production
- Running time: 50 min.

Original release
- Network: Programma Nazionale
- Release: 1968 – 1973

I ragazzi di padre Tobia is an Italian television series.

== See also ==
- List of Italian television series
