= All Stars (TV series) =

Italian TV series

- Genre: Sitcom
- Created by: Fatma Ruffini
- Starring: Fabio De Luigi; Diego Abatantuono; Ambra Angiolini; Antonio Cornacchione; Paolo Hendel; Bebo Storti; Gigio Alberti; Gianluca Impastato; Alessandro Sampoli; Francesco Foti; Chiara Gensini; Paolo Casiraghi; Anna Ammirati; Cinzia Mascoli; Zuleika Dos Santos; Ugo Conti
- Country of origin: Italy
- No. of seasons: 1
- No. of episodes: 20 (12 unaired)

Production
- Running time: 25 mins. (ep.)

Original release
- Release: September 21 – November 2, 2010

All Stars is an Italian television series.

== See also ==
- List of Italian television series
