= La stagione dei delitti =

Italian television series

- Country of origin: Italy

La stagione dei delitti is an Italian television series.

== See also ==
- List of Italian television series
