= Crimini bianchi =

- Genre: Medical drama
- Starring: Daniele Pecci; Ricky Memphis
- Country of origin: Italy
- Original language: Italian
- No. of seasons: 1
- No. of episodes: 12

Production
- Running time: 50 minutes

Original release
- Network: Canale 5; Italia 1; Joi
- Release: 24 September 2008 – 28 June 2009

Crimini bianchi is an Italian television series.

== See also ==
- List of Italian television series
