= Nonno Felice =

- Starring: Gino Bramieri
- Country of origin: Italy
- No. of seasons: 3
- No. of episodes: 77

Original release
- Network: Canale 5
- Release: 1992 – 1995

Nonno Felice is an Italian sitcom. It has a spin-off, Norma e Felice.

== Cast ==
- Gino Bramieri: Nonno Felice / Miss Felicita
- Paola Onofri: Ginevra
- Franco Oppini: Franco Malinverni
- Federico Rizzo: Federico Malinverni
- Eva Prantera: Eva Malinverni
- Morena Prantera: Morena Malinverni
- Sonia Grey: Cassiera del bar

== See also ==
- List of Italian television series
