= Classe di ferro =

Italian television series

- Directed by: Bruno Corbucci
- Country of origin: Italy
- No. of seasons: 2
- No. of episodes: 24

Classe di ferro is an Italian action/adventure television series that aired from October 6, 1989, to December 26, 1991. The series focused on a diverse group of young adults who enroll in Italy's military service.

== See also ==
- List of Italian television series
