= Casa Pierpiero =

2011 Italian television series

- Country of origin: Italy
- No. of seasons: 1

Original release
- Release: February 18, 2011

Casa Pierpiero is an Italian television sitcom airing on Disney Channel Italy. A spin-off of Quelli dell'Intervallo Cafe, the series follows young Pierpiero (Federico Mezzottoni), a rich boy who falls in love with a goth girl.

== See also ==
- List of Italian television series
