= Chiamatemi Giò =

2009 Italian TV series

- Genre: Sitcom
- Created by: Daniela Borsese
- Starring: Sara Santostasi; Alice Vastano; Stefano Contieri; Simone Previdi; Carlotta Rossi; Furio Bigi; Aubrey Asiedu; Andrea Appi; Marco Galluzzi; Alessandra Guazzini; Luis Molteni; Margherita Volo
- Country of origin: Italy
- Original language: Italian
- No. of seasons: 2
- No. of episodes: 35

Original release
- Network: Disney Channel (Italy)
- Release: February 9 – December 4, 2009

Chiamatemi Giò (Italian for 'Call me Giò') is an Italian teen sitcom.

== Plot ==
Giorgina "Giò" Manzi is a 14-year-old girl from the fictional town of Campo Grugnuccio, who moves to a big city to start high school. In addition to the strong change of environment, the girl will be forced to face the new schoolmates and initially everything will seem to go wrong.

== See also ==
- List of Italian television series
