= Life Bites – Pillole di vita =

- Starring: Valentina Colombo; Luca Solesin
- Country of origin: Italy
- No. of seasons: 6
- No. of episodes: 545

Original release
- Network: Disney Channel Italia
- Release: 2007 – 2013

Life Bites – Pillole di vita is an Italian television series broadcast on Disney Channel Italia from 2007 to 2013. A situation comedy aimed at teenagers, the show's protagonists are Giulia (played by Valentina Colombo) and her brother Teo (played by Luca Solesin). The series' director is Gianluca Brezza. The episodes—5-minute-long sketches—are designed to present brief glimpses into the daily lives of the protagonists and those of their friends and family. Life Bites – Pillole di vita was originally devised and developed in Disney Italia's short-form programming hub based in Milan and has been subsequently adapted in several other countries: in the UK as Life Bites, in France as Tranches de Vie, in Germany as Life Bites, and in Spain as Cosas de Vida.

== See also ==
- List of Italian television series
