= Stazione di servizio (TV series) =

- Starring: Marco Messeri, Paola Tiziana Cruciani
- Country of origin: Italy
- No. of seasons: 1

Original release
- Network: Rai 1

Stazione di servizio is an Italian television series.

== See also ==
- List of Italian television series
