= Quelli dell'Intervallo Cafe =

- Starring: Matteo Leoni; Romolo Guerreri; Giulia Boverio; Ambra Lo Faro; Marc Tainon; Andrea Leoni; Jacopo Sarno; Valentina Ghelfi; Tony Rucco; Clara Tarozzo; Benedetta Balestri; Luca Fiamenghi; Martina Russomanno; Monica Bonami
- Country of origin: Italy
- Original language: Italian
- No. of seasons: 2
- No. of episodes: 82

Production
- Running time: Approx 10 minutes

Original release
- Network: Disney Channel Italy
- Release: March 26, 2010 – April 15, 2011

Quelli dell'Intervallo Cafè is an Italian television series, second spin-off of the best known Quelli dell'intervallo, original format of As The Bell Rings. The series is set in the Nico's uncle's cafe, Quelli dell'intervallo cafè, where Nico and Tinelli work after school. There often sings Jaky, Nico and Tinelli's schoolmate and an emerging popstar. He has a bodyguard, named Brusco Lino (roughly translated as "Little Abrupt").

All the adventures of the boys are accompanied by the smell of croissants and the presence, not always welcome, of former teachers such as Professor Martinelli, horrible math teacher, who sometimes goes there to bring a bit of fear between her students.

All the Manzoni middle school's students are now gone to the high school and the only place where they can still be together is that cafe, very famous in the circle of guys. There are the always-brats Nico and Tinelli, who work there, but also characters as Mafalda (the nice and funny singer), Secchia (the swot), Valentina (the vain and admired girl), Rudy (the sporty girl) and other historical friends. In addiction to them there are new entries, such as Zita (the gossip girl), Uncle Tony (the cafe owner), Max (handsome and admired waiter), Mrs. Serena (a whiny woman who lives upstair the cafe).

== Crossover with other series ==
In an episode of the first season, called Jake and Blake, at the cafe are arriving two new guys, Jake and Blake (starring Benjamin Rojas). These two identical twins are the protagonist characters of the South American series Jake and Blake.

== International Adaption ==
Quelli dell'intervallo cafe is become very famous and popular even outside the Italian territory. First is France that, with its Trop la classe! Cafe, is following in the footsteps of this series.
