= Nati ieri =

- Genre: Medical drama
- Created by: Luca Bernabei
- Country of origin: Italy
- No. of seasons: 1
- No. of episodes: 26

Production
- Running time: 50 minutes

Original release
- Network: Canale 5 (ep. 1-18), Rete 4 (ep. 19-26)
- Release: December 21, 2006 – July 6, 2007

Nati ieri is an Italian television series.

== See also ==
- List of Italian television series
