= Cotti e mangiati =

Italian television series

- Country of origin: Italy
- Original language: Italian
- No. of episodes: 75

Production
- Running time: 5 minutes

Original release
- Network: Rai Uno
- Release: July 3, 2006 – September 12, 2008

Cotti e mangiati (Cooked and eaten) is an Italian sitcom that aired on RAI Uno in 2006. It starred Flavio Insinna as the lead character, Franco Mancini, a married car rental dealer, and father of two teenagers. The show performed poorly in ratings; however since episodes were only 5 minutes in length, 75 episodes were aired. Each dealt with family issues like teenage pregnancy, peer pressure, etc.

The series first aired in the summer of 2006 in the period after the main edition of TG1 and was seen as an imitator of Italia 1's Love Bugs, which had a similar format, as well as the Italian version of Camera Café, which aired on the same network. What set it apart from Camera Café was that the format was entirely Italian. The first episode was broadcast on 3 July 2006 in order to raise national interest in the final matches of the 2006 FIFA World Cup, which was eventually won by Italy.
