= Il mammo =

- Genre: Sitcom
- Created by: Maurizio Simonetti
- Starring: Enzo Iacchetti; Natalia Estrada; Antonio Petrocelli; Giovanni Battezzato; Elisa Triani; Federica Citarella; Rossana Carretto; Luca Annovazzi
- Country of origin: Italy
- No. of seasons: 3
- No. of episodes: 60

Original release
- Network: Canale 5
- Release: February 22, 2004 – February 2, 2008

Il mammo is an Italian sitcom.

== Cast ==
- Enzo Iacchetti: Silvano Zerbi
- Natalia Estrada: Patty Morales Miranda
- Elisa Triani: Ginevra
- Federica Citarella: Raffaella Zerbi
- Luca Annovazzi: Luca Zerbi
- Francesca Di Cara: Linda Zerbi
- Antonio Petrocelli: Pierpaolo
- Rossana Carretto: Giada Coletti

== See also ==
- List of Italian television series
