= Don Luca =

- Country of origin: Italy
- No. of seasons: 2

Original release
- Network: Canale 5
- Release: 2000 – 2003

Don Luca is an Italian sitcom.

== Cast ==
- Luca Laurenti: Don Luca
- Paolo Ferrari: Don Lorenzo
- Marisa Merlini: Palmira
- Jacopo Sarno: Mirko
- Barbara Di Bartolo: Chiara
- Mavi Felli: Maddalena
- Gianni Fantoni: Silvano

== See also ==
- List of Italian television series
