= Fiore e Tinelli =

- Country of origin: Italy

Original release
- Release: 2007 – 2009

Fiore e Tinelli is an Italian television series.

== See also ==
- List of Italian television series
- Quelli dell'intervallo
