= Raimondo Vianello =

Italian actor

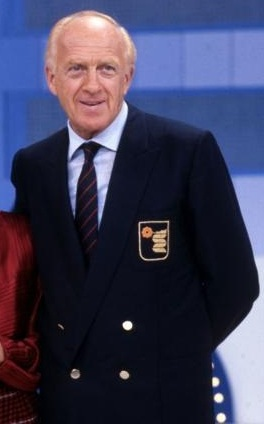
- Vianello in the 1980s in the Zig Zag studio
- Born: 7 May 1922; Rome, Kingdom of Italy
- Died: 15 April 2010 (aged 87); Milan, Italy
- Other names: Riccardo Vianello; Raimondo Viani
- Occupations: Actor; comedian; television presenter
- Years active: 1947–1968 (cinema); 1954–2008 (TV)
- Spouse: Sandra Mondaini (m. 1962)
- Relatives: Giacinto Mondaini (father-in-law)

Raimondo Vianello (7 May 1922 – 15 April 2010) was an Italian film actor, comedian, and television host. He was a well-known Italian television personality.

== Biography ==
He was born in Rome, but spent his youth in Pula, where his father, an Admiral of the Regia Marina, directed the local naval academy.

During World War II he joined the Italian Social Republic, the fascist puppet state established in northern Italy after the Allied invasion of Italy. He was captured by American troops. In 1958 he met actress Sandra Mondaini, whom he married four years later, and with whom he frequently appeared in TV shows during his whole career.

His first famous partner on the small screen was Ugo Tognazzi with whom, starting from 1954, he hosted the satyrical show Un due tre; the show was halted in 1959 after the duo performed an ironical sketch about the then-president of the Republic, Giovanni Gronchi. Vianello then moved full-time to cinema, appearing in a total of 79 films between 1947 and 1968. In the 1970s he returned to RAI (the Italian state broadcasting company, then the only one existing) with a series of Saturday shows which made him and Mondaini extremely popular as hosts and authors of sketches. During his TV career Vianello also hosted quiz shows, such as Zig Zag and Il gioco del 9 on Canale 5; he also hosted the 1998 edition of the Sanremo Music Festival and, from 1991 to 1999, Pressing, Mediaset's Sunday night sports talk show.

His best-known and long-lasting TV programme, Casa Vianello, was a sitcom shot from 1988 to 2008 and broadcast by Mediaset channels Canale 5 and later moved to Rete 4, in which he and Mondaini played fictionalised versions of themselves.

He died at the San Raffaele Hospital of kidney failure in Milan on 15 April 2010 at the age of 87. His wife Sandra Mondaini died 5 months later in the same hospital.

== Selected filmography ==
- Departure at Seven (1946)
- Fear and Sand (1948)
- Napoleon (1951)
- Poppy (1952)
- Laugh! Laugh! Laugh! (1954)
- My Wife's Enemy (1959)
- Guardatele ma non toccatele (1959)
- Sua Eccellenza si fermò a mangiare (1961)
- Hercules in the Valley of Woe (1961)
- I maniaci (1964)
- Amore all'italiana (1965)
- I figli del leopardo (1965)
- Il vostro super agente Flit (1966)
- For a Few Dollars Less (1966)
- Seven Times Seven (1968)
