= Striscia la notizia =

Italian satirical television program

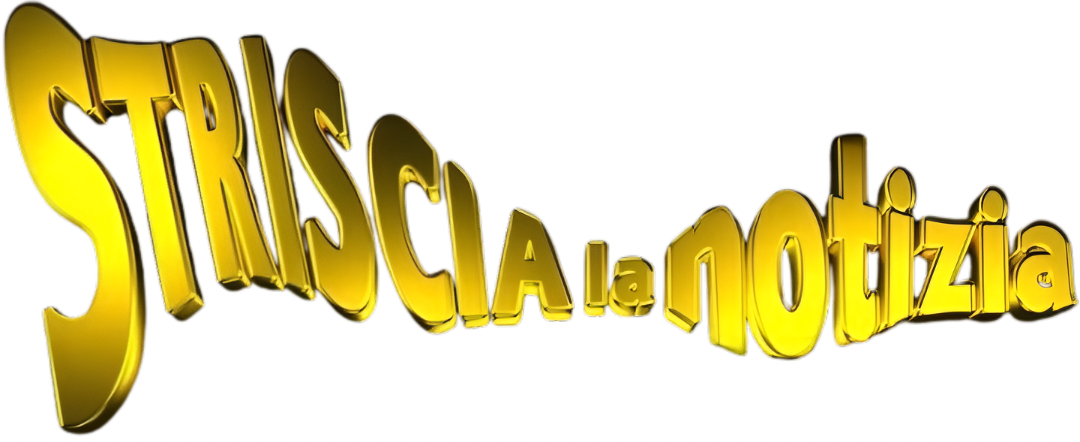
- Striscia la notizia logo
- Genre: Satire, comedy
- Created by: Antonio Ricci
- Directed by: Beppe Recchia (1988); Rinaldo Gaspari (1989–1990); Sergio Attardo (1990–1991); Silvia Arzuffi (1991–1992); Riccardo Recchia (1992–1996); Roberta Bellini (1996–2004); Giuliano Forni (2004–2005); Mauro Marinello (2005–present)
- Presented by: Various
- Country of origin: Italy
- Original language: Italian
- No. of seasons: 37
- No. of episodes: 7965

Production
- Running time: 35–60 min

Original release
- Network: Mediaset: Italia 1 (1988); Canale 5 (1989–2026)
- Release: 6 October 1988 – 19 February 2026

Striscia la notizia (Italian: [ˈstriʃʃa la noˈtittsja], "the news slithers") is an Italian satirical television program on the Mediaset-controlled Canale 5. Launched in 1988, it is meant to be a parody of the daily news, which airs right before the program, but Striscia also satirizes government corruption and exposes scams with the help of local reporters who are also comedians. The program is created by Antonio Ricci and is hosted by two major comedians.

The name of the show literally translates in English as "The News Slither".

== Gabibbo ==
Gabibbo, an Italian cultural icon, is the red mascot of the TV show, with a strong Genoa accent. Always loud, braggart but pungent in his naive but straightforward ways, it is one of the reporters of the program and it also sings and dances the theme song at the end of every episode. The character appears also in another TV show called Paperissima.

== Veline ==
The term velina (English: tissue paper) is a figurative term in Italian journalism which refers to government-issued propagated news. It is a parody of the news industry during the Fascist era under Benito Mussolini, where the government controlled and heavily censored all news reports and papers.

Within Striscia, the veline are two young women (one blonde, the other brunette) who perform short dances called stacchetti, always finishing up on the news anchors' desk. Originally, they also came on stage to hand the "news anchors" their news.

Since 2012, the term velina became an entry in Italian dictionaries.

=== List of veline ===
Names	Years
Cristina Prevosti, Stefania Dall'Olio, Eliette Mariangelo, Micaela Verdiani	1988
Jordy Gordon, Indra Smith, Simonetta Pravettoni, Terry Sessa, Annalisa Gambi (not all the season)	1989/1990
Laura Paternoster, Monica Spreafico, Simonetta Pravettoni, Terry Sessa, Sonia Grey, Angela Cavagna (the nurse)	1990/1991
Ana Laura Ribas, Terry Sessa, Simonetta Pravettoni	1991/1992
Cecilia Belli, Fanny Cadeo	1992/1993
Cecilia Belli, Laura Valci, Fanny Cadeo	1993/1994
Miriana Trevisan, Laura Freddi	1994/1995
Alessia Merz, Cristina Quaranta	1995/1996
Roberta Lanfranchi, Marina Graziani	1996/1997
Alessia Mancini, Marina Graziani	1997/1998
Roberta Lanfranchi, Marina Graziani	1998/1999
Maddalena Corvaglia, Elisabetta Canalis	1999/2002
Giorgia Palmas, Elena Barolo	2002/2004
Lucia Galeone, Vera Atyushkina	2004/2005
Melissa Satta, Thais Souza Wiggers	2005/2007
Melissa Satta, Veridiana Mallman	2008
Federica Nargi, Costanza Caracciolo	2008/2012
Alessia Reato, Giulia Calcaterra	2012/2013
Irene Cioni, Ludovica Frasca	2013/2017
Shaila Gatta, Mikaela Neaze Silva	2017/2021
Giulia Pelagatti, Talisa Jade Ravagnani	2021/2022
Anastasia Ronca, Cosmary Fasanelli	2022/2023

== Golden Tapir ==
The Tapiro d'Oro (Golden Tapir), a small golden statue, is a special prize usually delivered to big celebrities or politicians who have been humiliated or defeated. Although many personalities take it in front of the cameras in the hope of getting attention for themselves, others run away and Valerio Staffelli, a special correspondent for the show, has to run after them until they finally take it. Some even react aggressively. In 2003, Rai Uno Director Fabrizio Del Noce, cornered by Staffelli, banged his microphone on the reporter's face, breaking Staffelli's nose.

== Subtitles ==
Each edition of Striscia la notizia uses a different subtitle.

Year	Edition	Subheading	Translation
1988/1989	1ª	Giornale Radio	Radio News
1989/1990	2ª	La voce dell'innocenza	The Voice of Innocence
1990/1991	3ª	La voce dell'incoscienza	The Voice of Irresponsibility
1991/1992	4ª	La voce dell'impotenza	The Voice of Powerlessness
1992/1993	5ª	La voce dell'incontinenza	The Voice of Incontinence
1993/1994	6ª	La voce dell'intenza	The Voice of Intention
1994/1995	7ª	La voce dell'insistenza	The Voice of Persistence
1995/1996	8ª	La voce dell'impenitenza	The Voice of Unrepentance
1996/1997	9^{a}	La voce dell'incandescenza	The Voice of Incandescence
1997/1998	10ª	La voce dell'insorgenza	The Voice of Uprising
1998/1999	11ª	La voce dell'inavvertenza	The Voice of Inattention
1999/2000	12ª	La voce dell'interferenza	The Voice of Interference
2000/2001	13ª	La voce dell'imprudenza	The Voice of Recklessness
2001/2002	14ª	La voce dell'insolenza	The Voice of Insolence
2002/2003	15ª	La voce della differenza	The Voice of Difference
2003/2004	16ª	La voce della renitenza	The Voice of Resistance
2004/2005	17ª	La voce dell'indipendenza	The Voice of Independence
2005/2006	18ª	La voce della divergenza	The Voice of Dissent
2006/2007	19ª	La voce della turbolenza	The Voice of Turbulence
2007/2008	20ª	La voce della persistenza	The Voice of Persistence
2008/2009	21ª	La voce della supplenza	The Voice of Substitute Teachers
2009/2010	22ª	La voce dell'influenza	The Voice of Influenza/the Flu
2010/2011	23ª	La voce dell'improvvidenza	The Voice of Indifference
2011/2012	24ª	La voce della contingenza	The Voice of Contingency
2012/2013	25ª	La voce dell'insolvenza	The Voice of Insolvency
2013/2014	26ª	La voce dell'irruenza	The Voice of Passion
2014/2015	27ª	La voce dell'indecenza	The Voice of Indecency
2015/2016	28ª	La voce dell'invadenza	The Voice of Intrusion
2016-2017	29ª	La voce dell'impudenza	The Voice of Audacity
2017-2018	30ª	La voce dell'intraprendenza	The Voice of Initiative
2018-2019	31ª	La voce dell'inconsistenza	The Voice of Inconsistency
2019-2020	32ª	La voce della resilienza	The Voice of Resilience
2020-2021	33ª	La voce dell'insofferenza	The Voice of Impatience
2021-2022	34ª	La voce dell'inscienza	The Voice of Ignorance
2022-2023	35ª	La voce dell'intransigenza	The Voice of Intransigence

== Ratings since 2001 ==
Edition	Year	Episodes	Viewers	Share
14ª	2001-2002	208	8.530.000	32,01%
15ª	2002-2003	204	8.803.000	32,18%
16ª	2003-2004	220	7.473.000	27,01%
17ª	2004-2005	207	6.712.000	24,71%
18ª	2005-2006	212	7.706.000	28,71%
19ª	2006-2007	216	7.390.000	28,36%
20ª	2007-2008	215	7.022.000	26,96%
21ª	2008-2009	221	6.975.000	26,21%
22ª	2009-2010	221	6.633.000	25,09%
23ª	2010-2011	222	5.812.000	21,12%
24ª	2011-2012	223	6.186.000	21,88%
25ª	2012-2013	227	5.613.000	19,88%
26ª	2013-2014	220	5.009.000	18,29%
27ª	2014-2015	221	5.353.000	19,48%
28ª	2015-2016	226	4.831.000	18,34%
29ª	2016-2017	221	4.747.000	18,55%
30ª	2017-2018	222	4.774.000	18,65%
31ª	2018-2019	221	4.684.000	18,30%
32ª	2019-2020	239	4.420.000	17,53%
33ª	2020-2021			

== Awards ==
Striscia la notizia is one of the most awarded Italian TV shows ever.

- 1990 – Premio Regia Televisiva
- 1990 – Telegatto
- 1991 – Telegatto
- 1995 – Telegatto
- 1995 – Premio Regia Televisiva
- 1996 – Premio Regia Televisiva
- 1997 – Telegatto
- 1997 – Premio Regia Televisiva
- 1998 – Telegatto
- 1998 – Premio Regia Televisiva
- 1999 – Telegatto
- 1999 – Premio Regia Televisiva
- 2000 – Telegatto
- 2000 – Telegatto
- 2000 – Premio Regia Televisiva
- 2001 – Telegatto
- 2001 – Telegatto
- 2001 – Premio Regia Televisiva
- 2002 – Telegatto
- 2002 – Premio Regia Televisiva
- 2003 – Telegatto
- 2003 – Premio Regia Televisiva
- 2004 – Premio Regia Televisiva
- 2005 – Premio Regia Televisiva
- 2006 – Telegatto
- 2006 – Premio Regia Televisiva
- 2007 – Telegatto
- 2007 – Premio Regia Televisiva
- 2007 – Premio Regia Televisiva
- 2008 – Telegatto
- 2008 – Telegatto Special Anniversary
- 2008 – Premio Regia Televisiva
- 2008 – Premio Regia Televisiva
- 2008 – Leggio d'oro
- 2009 – Premio Regia Televisiva
- 2010 – Premio Regia Televisiva
- 2011 – Premio Regia Televisiva
- 2011 – Guinness World Records Longest-running satirical news TV programme
- 2012 – Premio Regia Televisiva
- 2012 – VideoFestival Città di Imperia
- 2012 – Celebrity Games (Winner)
- 2013 – Premio Regia Televisiva
- 2014 – Premio Regia Televisiva
- 2015 – Premio Regia Televisiva
- 2016 – Premio Regia Televisiva
- 2017 – Telegatto Special edition for Striscia la notizia 30th season

== International editions ==
- Cronica Cârcotașilor (Romania)
- Fiks Fare (Albania)
- Kiks Kosova (Kosovo)
- Gospodari Na Efira (Bulgaria)
- Golata Istina (Bulgaria)

== Current cast ==
- Gabibbo - Correspondent on waste and injustice (since 1990)
- Valerio Staffelli - Bearer of the Golden Tapir and correspondent on injustices and scams (since 1996)
- Jimmy Ghione - Sent from Lazio and, for a short period, in 2020, also on issues related to the world of animals (since 1998)
- Antonio Casanova - Magical and occasional correspondent on waste and injustice (since 1999)
- Max Laudadio - Sent from the North-West (since 2003)
- Moreno Morello - Sent from the North-East (since 2003)
- Stefania Petyx and the dachshund - Sent from Sicily (since 2004)
- Cristiano Militello - Edits the columns Striscia lo bannere and Striscia il billboard (since 2004)
- Luca Abete - Sent from Campania (since 2005)
- Vittorio Brumotti - Correspondent on waste, injustice and social issues (since 2008)
- Luca Galtieri - Correspondent of Why? of daily life regarding disservices, inconveniences, problems and injustices (since 2010)
- Davide Rampello - Edits the column Paese, landscape... until 2017 called Paese e landscape (since 2013)
- Fabrizio Fontana alias Capitan Ventosa - Correspondent on environmental/acoustic/electromagnetic pollution (since 2014)
- Riccardo Trombetta - Correspondent on injustices and scams in the economic/financial field (since 2015)
- Luca Sardella - Edits the Green Hope column (since 2015)
- Alessio Giannone aka Pinuccio - Sent from Abruzzo, Molise, Puglia and Basilicata (since 2015)
- Rajae Bezzaz - Immigration and integration correspondent (since 2015)
- Chiara Squaglia - Sent from Tuscany (since 2015)
- Leonardo Tiralongo - Edits the Ambiente Ciovani column (since 2019)
- Gabriele Scola - Edits the Ambiente Ciovani column (since 2019)
- Marco Camisani Calzolari (aka MCC) - Expert in digital culture (since 2017)
- Roberto Lipari (since 18 November 2019, sent mainly from Sicily, and in particular from Palermo)
- Paolo Marchi - Edits the column Italian masterpieces in the kitchen (since 2019)
- Serena Mauri - Edits the Ambiente Ciovani column (since 2020)
- Silvia Mauri - Edits the Ambiente Ciovani column (since 2020)
- Giulietta Salmeri - Edits the Ambiente Ciovani column (since 2020)
- Angelica Massera in the role of "Super Cazzolina", " deepfake " by Lucia Azzolina in the 2020-2021 season then curates spaces linked to the figure of Mothers and School (from 2020)
- Andrea Rivera - "Intercom" correspondent (since 2020)
- Giuseppe Longinotti - "The politically correct inspector", "il Senatore Longinotti" (dal 2020), "Senator Longinotti" (from 2020)
- Dario Ballantini:impressionist of Giuseppe Conte, Pope Francis, Anna Maria Cancellieri, Paola Borboni, Roberto Speranza, Angelino Alfano, Michela Vittoria Brambilla, Roberto Maroni, Matteo Renzi, Paolo Gentiloni, Luca Cordero di Montezemolo, Ignazio La Russa, Valentino, Nanni Moretti, Valentino Rossi, Vasco Rossi, Enrico Letta, Gianni Morandi, Susanna Camusso, Ignazio Marino, Matteo Salvini, Donald Trump, Angela Merkel, Roberto Cingolani and Luciana Lamorgese (since 2004)
- Giampaolo Fabrizio as Bruno Vespa (since 2005)
- Sergio Friscia as Beppe Grillo (since 2011)
- Valeria Graci as: Peppia Pig (parody of Peppa Pig), Mariuolo, Luigi Di Maio's "brother in black", mother of Virginia Raggi, Mancia e Orso (parody of Masha and the Bear), Barbara D'Urso, Federica Panicucci, Greta Thunberg, Rita Pavone, Paola De Micheli, Jole Santelli, Smurfette Leotta, "little sister" of Diletta Leotta, Ursula von der Leyen (since 2014)
- Francesca Manzini as Mara Venier, Ilary Blasi (since 2019)
- Nando Timoteo as a fake journalist (from 2021)
- Enrico Lucci - Sent to follow the election of the new President of the Republic (from 2022)
- The Samsons - (from 2022)
