= Cascina Vianello =

Italian television series

- Country of origin: Italy

Original release
- Network: Canale 5

Cascina Vianello is an Italian television series.

== See also ==
- List of Italian television series
