= Casa Vianello =

Italian television series

- Genre: Sitcom
- Starring: Raimondo Vianello; Sandra Mondaini; Giorgia Trasselli; Gregorio Palma; Enzo Guarini; Roberto Marelli; Pino Pellegrino; Nicola De Buono; Antonio Cornacchione; Barbara Snellenburg; Raffaele Fallica
- Country of origin: Italy
- No. of seasons: 16
- No. of episodes: 338

Production
- Running time: 24 minutes

Original release
- Network: Canale 5 (1988-2005); Rete 4 (2005-2007)
- Release: January 17, 1988 – April 15, 2007

Casa Vianello is an Italian sitcom produced by Mediaset that aired on Canale 5 from January 17, 1988 to February 5, 2005, with fourteen seasons airing on the channel, to then air on Rete 4 from December 21, 2005 to April 15, 2007, with only two seasons airing on the channel, with a total of sixteen seasons consisting of 338 episodes.

Considering the total number of production years, Casa Vianello is the longest sitcom ever produced in Italian television. Considering instead the number of episodes, Casa Vianello is at second place after the Italian adaptation of the french sitcom Caméra Café.

The sitcom centers around on the daily life of Raimondo Vianello and Sandra Mondaini (married couple both in the sitcom and in real life), narrating their bickering and their initiatives, only to be then always brought forward in a clumsy manner, causing misunderstandings and double meanings.

== Characters ==
- Raimondo Vianello: played by himself
- Sandra Mondaini: played by herself
- Tata: played by Giorgia Trasselli
