= Disney Channel (Italy) =

Italian pay-television channel

- Final logo, used from 15 May 2017 to 1 May 2020
- Country: Italy
- Broadcast area: Italy; Malta; San Marino; Vatican City
- Headquarters: Milan

Programming
- Languages: Italian (dubbing); English
- Picture format: HDTV 1080i; SDTV 576i (downscaled)
- Timeshift service: Disney Channel +1

Ownership
- Owner: The Walt Disney Company (Italia) S.R.L. Disney Branded Television
- Sister channels: Disney Jr.

History
- Launched: 3 October 1998; 28 years ago
- Closed: 1 May 2020; 6 years ago
- Replaced by: Disney+ (most of its content)

Links
- Website: tv.disney.it

Disney Channel was an Italian pay television channel that was owned and operated by The Walt Disney Company Italy. It was launched on 3 October 1998, and its programming consists on the also known as a U.S. channel on the either American, European or locally produced and third party programming acquired by the network.

Disney Channel and its timeshift ceased broadcasting on 1 May 2020 due to Disney failing to renew a deal with Sky Italy, with content moving to Disney+.

== History ==
On 3 October 1998, Disney Channel officially began broadcasting in Italian on TELE+ Digitale. Among the first programs on the channel were Disney animated television series, such as Timon & Pumbaa and Aladdin: The Series. It also showed Disney films and some Disney Channel Original Movies on "Il Fantastico Mondo Disney" (The Wonderful World of Disney) each evening at 20.30 (8:30 pm). A new film was shown every Saturday at the same time slot. In January 1999, Disney Channel launched its original live presentation show: Disney Channel Live (later called Live Zone). In this program, hosted by Isabella Arrigoni and Massimiliano Ossini, viewers interact with the hosts and join games. Other popular programs were Live Zone – Musica, Live Zone – Sport, Live Zone – Da scoprire, Live Zone – Da ridere and Una stella per te (A Star for You).

On 1 November 1999, Disney Channel adopted the new "Circles" logo and idents of Disney Channel UK (created by GÉDÉON). Around that same time, the slogan "Libera la tua Immaginazione" (English: "Free your imagination") debuted on-air.

In 2002, Disney Channel launched two new programs: Quasi Gol and L'ora della magia.

The channel had been available since 2003 on Sky Italia, after the merger between TELE+ Digitale and Stream TV.

On 18 May 2003, Disney Channel adopted the American Disney Channel's new logo (designed by CA Square), along with new graphics and idents.

Live Zone ended in September 2003; it was replaced by Prime Time, led by the hosts of Live Zone, Isabella Arrigoni and Massimiliano Ossini. Even programs secondary to Live Zone were replaced by newer ones like Tok, Eta Beta, and Skatenati. Another program was added, Scooter.

On 24 December 2004, Disney introduced Disney Channel +1, where all regular programs from Disney Channel are postponed an hour.

In 2006, almost all live shows were taken off air.

Prime Time got a refresh in September 2005, with a new logo, new computer-generated graphics, and Arrigoni being the voice-over host who presented the programs.

In 2005, Disney Channel launched a new series called Quelli dell'intervallo, which led to the similar versions in the UK, US, Australia and other countries under the title As the Bell Rings. In 2006, Disney Channel began airing many English language series from the Disney Channel US. These versions were moved to a new channel called Disney in English in 2008.

In January 2007, Prime Time changed its logo once again, and Patrizio Prata became its new voice-over host, although the set design and cartoons remained the same. On 14 May 2007, Prime Time ended and Disney Channel adopted the Ribbon graphics of the Disney Channel (US).

On 8 December 2008, Disney Channel and its +1 timeshift began broadcasting on Mediaset Premium.

On 1 October 2011, Disney Channel adopted new "Smartphone App" logo that was introduced in the US in 2010, and began broadcasting in the 16:9 aspect ratio area (reruns of some series still air in the 4:3 aspect ratio). On the same day, sister channel Toon Disney, which was the last one under this brand, ceased broadcasting along with its timeshift. Toon Disney and Toon Disney +1 were replaced by Disney Channel +2 and Disney XD +2.

Since 1 February 2012, Disney Channel began broadcasting in HD on Sky Italia.

On 8 June 2014, the channel renewed its logo and graphics like the Disney Channel US ones.

On 30 September 2016, Disney Channel and Disney Channel +1 ceased broadcasting on Mediaset Premium.

On 15 May 2017, the channel renewed its logo, which became two-dimensional and changed the graphics.

On 9 April 2018, timeshift channels Disney Channel +2 and Disney XD +2 were discontinued on air.

On 1 October 2019, Disney XD and Disney in English ceased broadcasting after a deal with Sky Italia was not renewed.

On 1 May 2020 at exactly 00:00 CEST, Disney Channel (along with its sister channel), both closed down with the last program being the Mickey Mouse episode "Three-Legged Race", with their content moving to Disney+.

== Related channels ==
=== Disney Channel HD ===
It was the high definition version of Disney Channel, launched on 1 February 2012. It was only available on the Sky Italia platform for owners of Sky Box HD. On this version, moreover, subtitles were available (where present) in Italian and English.

=== Disney Channel +1 ===
It was the time-shift version, launched on 24 December 2004, which re-aired the Disney Channel programs an hour later.

=== Disney Channel +2 (defunct) ===
It was the time-shift version of the Disney Channel, launched on 1 October 2011, which re-aired the programs two hours later. It was later ceased its broadcasts on 9 April 2018.

== Logos ==
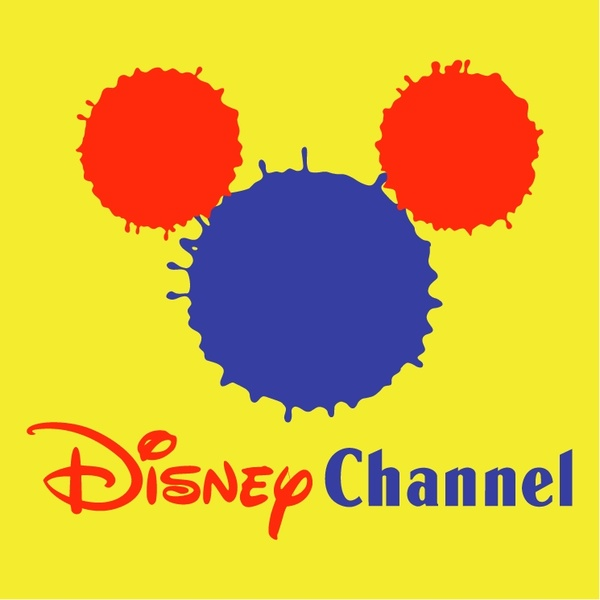
1998–2003

2003–2011

2011–2014

2014–2017

2017–2020
