= 2001 in Italian television =

This is a list of Italian television related events from 2001.

== Events ==
- March 20: the Italian Parliament approves the Law 66 about radio and television; it has chosen December 31, 2006 as the date for the passage of TV broadcasting from analog to digital.

=== RAI ===
- February 26 – March 3: Sanremo festival, hosted by Raffaella Carrà and Enrico Papi, won by Elisa with Luce (tramonti a nord est). The contest does not get its usual public success and is panned by critics. Particularly, the Placebo's vocalist Brian Molko, who brokes a guitar on stage, and the co-presenter Enrico Papi who, during a linkup with Buenos Aires, mocks the principal of the Italian schools in Argentina for her Southern accent, arouse scandal.
- March 1: in the D+ package, debut of the channel RaiSat Fiction, dedicated to the best of European fiction.
- March 14: two months before the election the journalist Marco Travaglio, presenting his book L’odore dei soldi (The money's aroma) at the Daniele Luttazzi's show Satyricon, accuses Silvio Berlusconi and Marcello Dell’Utri of financial liaisons with Cosa Nostra, citing an almost inedited Paolo Borsellino's interview. The program causes very harsh reactions by the House of Freedom, which charges RAI of politic partiality and defamation; two RAI board members, near to the party, resign in protest. Luttazzi is criticized also by leftist politics, as Luciano Violante, but defended by the RAI president Roberto Zaccaria; its show goes on after a one-week suspension.
- March 16: two day after the "Travaglio affair", Michele Santoro too, in his program Il raggio verde, treats the presumed liaisons with Cosa Nostra of men near to Silvio Berlusconi; the political leader himself phone to the host and has, live, an harsh squabble with him, saying: "Congratulations for your process on air". Indro Montanelli too is attacked by the House of Freedom, for the severe judgments about his former editor Berlusconi given in TV interviews with Alain Elkann and Enzo Biagi.
- April 26: launch of RAI MED, satellite channel in Italian and Arabic.
- May 8: five day before the election, Silvio Berlusconi, guest of Porta a porta, signs live the Contract with the Italians; during the electoral campaign, he has obstinately avoided a face to face in television with the center-left leader Francesco Rutelli, preferring to appear in programs hosted by friendly journalists, as Maurizio Costanzo and Bruno Vespa. The Berlusconi's move, however demagogic, is revealed to be effective and May 13 House of Freedom wins the election.
- 20-l–21 July: RAI news and magazines follow, often live, the riots and the street clashes in Genoa for the 27th G8 summit. At 6 PM on the 20th, a special edition of TG1 announces the death of a young protester, whose name (Carlo Giuliani) is made public in the evening, in a special edition of Porta a porta. The next day, TG3 airs an interview to Giuliani's father, who asks for the end of the violence.
- October 22: Roberto Benigni's Life is beautiful, broadcast by RAI Uno, is the most seen movie in the history of Italian Television, with more than 16 million viewiers.
- November 20: the First Lady Franca Ciampi, on the Grinzane Cavour Prize, says to a public of teen-agers: "Read, read, don’t waste time with that deficient television, Zaccaria [the RAI president] pardon me"; the expression "deficient television" becomes soon customary. Already previously, Mrs. Ciampi had called the presenter Enrico Papi "a cretin" for his behaviour at the Sanremo festival.

=== Mediaset ===
- January 8: in the Stream package, debut of MT (Time Machine), channel of popular science produced by Mediaset and directed by Alessandro Cecchi Paone.
- March 8: Mediaset launches TGCOM, very short news program (3 minutes) diffused on-line, by mobile and on air, usually before the commercial breaks.
- May 22: on Canale 5, the first episode of The Sopranos is aired.
- September 11: at 3.12 pm (Italian hour), Emilio Fede (TG4) is the first to break the news of a terrorist act in New York City.
- September 22: debut of the talent show Saranno famosi (later, Amici di Maria De Filippi).
- 20 December: the financial promoter Flavio Montrucchio wins the second season of Grande Fratello; he had entered in the reality show replacing another contender, who had renounced not suffering the restrictions about smoke. Also Montrucchio, as Pietro Taricone the year before, exploits its popularity to pursue a career as actor and showman.

=== Telecom ===
- May 1: TMC2, after having resumed for few days the name Videomusic, ceases broadcasting and is substituted by MTV Italia. Rete A, which had hosted until then MTV on its frequencies, broadcasts on its place the German music channel VIVA.
- June 24: TMC changes name in La7. The new channel and MTV Italia, both owned by Telecom, aspire to become the third pole of Italian television, able to compete with RAI and Mediaset and engaging TV stars as Fabio Fazio, Giuliano Ferrara and Gad Lerner (who diriges the news program, TG La7). A show from Milan and Rome (Prima serata) hosted by Fazio and Luciana Litizzetto, celebrates the new deal, besides the A. S. Roma's scudetto.
- July 18: Roberto Colanino, due to the growing debit, is forced to yield Telecom to Olimpia, a company controlled by Marco Tronchetti Provera and the Benetton family. With the new owners, the project of a third TV pole is greatly scaled down; La 7 becomes a niche channel, focused on information.

=== Other channels ===
- March: the telecommunications company Fastweb launches its cable TV.
- August 26: D+ reorganizes its offer and becomes Tele+ Digitale; besides, the estate changes its conditional access system, to fight the growing diffusion of pirated smart-cards.
- December: in the Stream package, debut of the music channel Rock TV.

== Debuts ==
=== Rai ===
==== Serial ====
- Casa famiglia ("Group home") – by Riccardo Donna, with Massimo Dapporto and Arnoldo Foà; 2 seasons. Don Marco, the prison chaplain of Un prete tra noi, becomes director of a group home.
- Cocco Bill – cartoon by Pierluigi de Mas, inspired by the Benito Jacovitti's character; 2 seasons.

==== Variety ====
- Chiambretti c'è ("There is Chiambretti"), with Piero Chiambretti; 2 seasons.
- I raccomandati ("The connected") – musical talent show, where every amateurish contender is supported by a well-known singer, hosted by Carlo Conti and then by Pupo; 10 seasons.
- Stasera pago io ("I'm paying tonight"), with Rosario Fiorello; 3 seasons. It is a great public and critic success, thanks moreover to the presenter's easiness to interact with his guests, international stars included.

==== Educational ====
- Gaia, il pianeta che vive ("Gaia, the living planet") – show of popular science focused on the planet Earth and hosted by the geologist Mario Tozzi; five seasons.
- Passe-partout – magazine of art and tourism, hosted by the art historian Philippe Daverio with accuracy and together with humor; ten seasons.

=== Mediaset ===
==== Miniseries ====
- Il bello delle donne ("The women's nice side") –comedy-drama, set in a beauty salon in Orvieto, with Stefania Sandrelli, Giuliana De Sio, Nancy Brilli and Virna Lisi; 3 seasons and a spin-off (Il bello delle donne vent'anni dopo).

==== Serial ====
- CentoVetrine ("An hundred showcases") – soap opera, set in a Turin shopping center, with Elisabetta Coraini and Sergio Troiano; 15 seasons. After the RAI production Un posto al sole, it's the longest running Italian soap-opera.

==== Variety ====
- Saranno famosi, then Amici di Maria De Filippi, talent show hosted for the first three months by Daniele Bossari and till now by Maria De Filippi; again on air. It's one of the greatest public successes of the 2000s, becoming a cultural phenomenon and launching singers as Marco Carta, Alessandra Amoroso and Emma Marrone; however, it's also criticized for its atmosphere of exasperated competition.
- Popstars – Italian version of the New Zealand talent show, hosted by Daniele Bossari; 2 seasons. The winners of the first edition reunite in a girl-band (Lollipop), getting a certain success.
- Bande sonore ("Sound bands") – musical show, hosted by Vanessa Incontrada.
- Genius – quiz for kids, Italian version of Who Is the Smartest Kid in America?, hosted by Alessandro Cecchi Paone; 3 seasons.
- Mosquito – magazine for the young people, hosted by Gaja Bermani Amaral and Silvia Toffanin; 2 seasons
- Sfilata d'amore e di moda ("Love and fashion parade") – fashion show, aired annually in June, hosted by Emanuela Foliero and others; 12 seasons.

==== News and educational ====
- Gentes – magazine about Italian folklore, hosted by Elena Guarnieri; 9 seasons.
- Vivere meglio ("To live better") – magazine about medicine and wellness, hosted by Maurizio Trecca; 12 seasons.

=== Other private channels ===
- 100% (La 7) – Italian version of the English game show, hosted (as voice-over) by Gigio D'Ambrosio; 2 seasons.
- Call Game – La 7's game show hosted by Franchy TV and filming took place inside a shop, and that is decides which customers it chooses as competitors; 1 seasons.
- M.O.D.A. – (La 7) magazine about fashion and design, hosted by Cinzia Malvini; 13 seasons.
- La valigia dei sogni ("The carpet of dreams") – (La 7) magazine about the movies broadcast on La 7.
- Loveline (MTV Italia) – talk show about sexuality, hosted by Camilla Raznovich; 9 seasons.
- Video Clash (MTV) – contest of videoclip, hosted by Francesco Mandelli; 2 seasons.
- Ca' Volo (MTV) – talk show hosted by Fabio Volo; 2 seasons.
- Database (Rock TV) – music show hosted, in a very polemic way, by the singer-songwriter Pino Scotto; it lasts until 2016.
- Il grande talk (SAT 2000) – talk show about television, hosted by Massimo Bernardini; it lasts until 2011.

=== International ===
- 7 May – (United States) / (Canada) / (Germany) The Rainbow Fish (Rai 3) (1998–2000)
- September – (France) / (Canada) Mona the Vampire (Italia 1) (1999–2003)
- (United States) Underdog (Italia 1) (1964–1973)
- (United Kingdom) Bob the Builder (Rai 3) (1999–2012, 2015–present)
- (United Kingdom) / (Canada) Rotten Ralph (Rai 1) (1998–2001)
- (Australia) Home and Away (Comedy Life) (1988–present)

== Television shows ==
=== RAI ===
==== Drama ====
- Senza confini, Il commissario Palatucci ("Borderless, the surintendant Palatucci") – by Fabrizio Costa, with Sebastiano Somma in the title role and Chiara Caselli; 2 episodes.
- The Crusaders, by Dominique Othenin-Girard, with Alessandro Gasmann, Johannes Brandrup and Barbora Bobulova; 2 episodes.
- L'attentatuni ("The great attack") – by Claudio Bonivento, with Veronica Pivetti, Claudio Amendola and Massimo Popolizio; 2 episodes. The true story of the special squad that identified and captured the authors of the Capaci bombing.
- La piovra 10 – by Luigi Perelli, with Patricia Millardet and Remo Girone; 2 episodes. After 17 years and 10 chapters, La piovra franchise ends with the spectacular suicide of the villain Tano Cariddi.
- Con gli occhi dell'assassino ("With the killer’s eyes") – thriller by Corrado Colombo, with Valentina Chico.
- Brancaccio by Gianfranco Albano, biopic with Ugo Dighero as don Pino Puglisi.
- Almost America by Andrea and Antonio Frazzi, with Sabrina Ferilli as Italian woman migrated to Canada in the Fifties.
- Donne di mafia ("Mafia women") by Giuseppe Ferrara, with Tosca D'Aquino and Mietta; 2 episodes. The wives of some mafia members rebel against the criminal code of their husbands.
- L'uomo che piaceva alle donne, Bel Ami ("The man liked by women") – by Massimo Spano, with Hardy Kruger jr, from the Guy de Maupassant's novel, transposed in the modern high fashion; 2 episodes.
- Resurrection, by the Taviani brothers, with Stefania Rocca and Timothy Peach, from the Lev Tolstoj's novel; 2 episodes.
- La voce del sangue ("The voice of blood") – by Alessandro Di Robilant, with Franco Nero and Giorgio Pasotti; 2 episodes. A lawyer, enquiring about his family of origin, discover the world of 'ndrangheta.
- La crociera ("The cruise") – by Enrico Oldoini, romantic comedy with Anna Galliena and Vittoria Puccini; 2 episodes.

==== Serial ====
- Angelo il custode ("The warden angel") – by Gianfrancesco Lazotti, with Lino Banfi and Giovanna Ralli; 8 episodes.
- Compagni di scuola ("Classmates") – with Massimo Lopez and Paolo Sassanelli, from the Spanish series Companeros. It is the story of a school year in a Roman high school, focused on the vicissitudes of two brothers, both teachers.

===== Cartoons =====
- Sandokan – La tigre ruggisce ancora ("The tiger roars again").
- Taco e Paco – series in stop-motion for the children in pre-scholar age.

==== Variety ====
- L'ottavo nano ("The eighth dwarf") – satirical variety, hosted by Serena Dandini, with Corrado Guzzanti (also author), his sister Sabina and Neri Marcorè. For the show, that mocks pitilessly the Italian politics and television, Corrado Guzzanti creates two of his most famous characters: Vulvia (an anchorwoman vainly trying to hide her ignorance) and the impersonation of the singer Antonello Venditti.
- 125 milioni di caz..te ("125 millions bullshit") – hosted by Adriano Celentano and Asia Argento, musical show with ambitions of social satire.
- Dopo il festival tutti da me ("After festival, everybody to mine") – talk show following the Sanremo festival, hosted by Raffella Carrà and Enrico Papi (see over.)
- Il gladiatore ("Gladiator") – game show, hosted by Carlo Conti, suspended after three episodes for low ratings.
- Nientepopodimenoche ("None other than") – talent show, hosted by Michele Guardì.
- Passo doppio ("Double step") – hosted by Pippo Baudo, cycle of tribute shows in honor of 14 personalities of Italian television.
- Satyricon – hosted by Daniele Luttazzi. The show aspires to be the Italian version of the David Letterman show, mixing serious information and virulent satire (directed moreover against Silvio Berlusconi and the Catholic Church). The provocative and willingly coarse gags of Luttazzi (who, live, smells the paints of the soubrette Anna Falchi or eats chocolate in shape of excrements) arouse from the beginning controversies and charges of bad taste but it's moreover the interview by the actor to Marco Travaglio to become a political case (see over).
- SMS amiche per caso ("SMS casual friends") – reality show, similar to Grande fratello, but without the absolute seclusion and with an all-female cast.
- Tanti auguri Italia ("Congratulations, Italy") – show for the New Year 2002, hosted by Milly Carlucci and Massimo Lopez.

==== News and educational ====
- 11 settembre, America anno zero ("September 11, America year zero") – reportage by Corrado Formigli for the magazine Sciuscià about the New York response to the slaughter.
- Diario di un cronista ("A chronicler's diary") – anthology, cared by himself, of Sergio Zavoli’s works for television, from the 1962 reportage about the death of Erwin Rommel to his great serialized inquiries.

=== Mediaset ===
==== Drama ====
- Judas, with Enrico Lo Verso in the title role, and Thomas, with Ricky Tognazzi in the title role; tv-movies of the series Jesus' friends, both directed by Raffaele Mertes.
- Il morso del serpente ("The sting of the snake") and Occhi verde veleno ("Green poison eyes") – crime dramas by Luigi Parisi (the first a mafia story, the second a legal thriller) that contribute to launch the actor Gabriel Garko.
- Non ho l'età ("I'm not old enough") – by Giulio Base, with Marco Columbro and Raffaele Pisu; the comic adventures of a bus driver carrying to Rome a group of sprightly old men.
- Per amore per vendetta ("For love and revenge") – by Marco Caiano, with Massimo Dapporto, pilot of the serial Il commissario; 2 episodes.
- Piccolo mondo antico ("The little world of the past") – by Cinzia Th Torrini, from Antonio Fogazzaro's novel, with Alessandro Gassmann, Claudia Pandolfi and Virna Lisi.
- Il testimone ("The witness") –with Raoul Bova and Uno bianca ("The White Uno gang") with Kim Rossi Stuart and Dino Abbrescia; both by Michele Soavi, 2 episodes. The two movies, also if very fictionalized, are inspired by true stories of civil courage (a quiet veterinary defies Camorra witnessing about a crime; two police officers defeat a gang composed by corrupted colleagues).

==== Miniseries ====
- Cuore ("Heart") – by Maurizio Zaccaro, from the Edmondo De Amicis' novel, with Giulio Scarpati, Anna Valle and Leo Gullotta; 6 episodes. The literary source is adapted very freely (a love story is added and the villain Franti redeems himself).
- L'impero ("The empire") – by Lamberto Bava, with Claudio Amendola and Claudia Koll; four episodes. A DIA inspector enquires about an international intrigue, involving also his lover.

==== Serial ====
- Via Zanardi 33 – sitcom with Dino Abbrescia and Elio Germano; the daily life of six students at the Bononia University. The sitcom is thought as the Italian answer to Friends, but it does not get the hoped success and is deleted after a season.

==== Variety ====
- Grande Fratello (2000–present)
- Cari amici miei ("Dear my friends") – reality show, ideated by Paolo Bonolis; four VIPs are shot by the TV cameras while they have dinner.
- Al Bano, una voce nel sole ("Al Bano, a voice in the sun") – music show.
- La notte vola ("Night flies") – show about the music of the Eighties, hosted by Lorella Cuccarini.
- Ciao belli ("Hello, nice people") – TV version of the successful satirical show by Digei Angelo and Roberto Ferrari, aired by Radio Deejay since 1997; here, the two conductors and the actors are impersonated by puppets.
- Piccole canaglie ("Little rascals") – candid camera with children playing pranks on adults, hosted by Paola Perego and Pino Insegno.
- Tacchi a spillo ("High heels") – talent show hosted by Claudio Lippi and Michelle Hunziker, with eight drag queens as contenders.

===== Game shows =====
- 2008 – quiz with Andrea Pezzi; the home public participates sending an SMS to the phone number of the title.
- Facce da quiz ("Quiz faces") – hosted by Gigi Sabani.
- Salto nel buio ("Leap in the dark") – hosted by Paola Perego.
- Italiani – variety and game show, hosted by Paolo Bonolis and Luca Laurenti; it is one of the few clamorous flops in the Roman presenter's career.

===== Talk shows =====
- I sette vizi capitali ("The seven deadly sins") – hosted by Paola Perego.
- L"assemblea ("The assembly") – aimed to the young ones and hosted by Ambra Angiolini.
- Jet Set – hosted by Emanuela Foliero.
- Sembra ieri ("It seems like yesterday") – talk show about the last fifty years of history, hosted by Iva Zanicchi.

==== News and educational ====
- Tutto in un giorno ("All in a day") – documentary reconstructing relevant events (as the Genoa G8 summit) through the actions of four persons.

=== La 7 and MTV ===
==== Variety ====
- Call game – Italian version of the homonymous Dutch show of phone games.
- Il labirinto ("The labyrinth") – game show, hosted by Tamara Donà.
- Telerentola – clip show hosted by Roberta Lanfranchi, Italian version of the French Drôle de zapping.
- Tema – talk show hosted by Rosita Celentano.

==== News and educational ====
- Diario di guerra ("War diary") – magazine following the war in Afghanistan, hosted by Paolo Argentini.

==== Serial ====
- Bradipo (MTV Italia) – sitcom, ideated and intercepted as himself by Andrea Pezzi.

== Ending this year ==
- Le ali della vita
- Allegria!
- Amici
- Ciao ciao
- Una donna per amico
- Galagoal
- Kitchen
- Mai dire gol
- Matricole
- Non lasciamoci più
- OK, il prezzo è giusto
- La piovra
- I ragazzi irresistibili
- Sei forte, maestro
- Sesso, parlano le donne
- Sette per uno
- La settimana di Montanelli
- Taratata
- TG rosa
- TMC news
- Il trucco c'è
- Turbo

== Networks and services ==
=== Launches ===
Network	Type	Launch date	Notes	Source
Rock TV	Cable and satellite	Unknown		
24ore.tv	Cable and satellite	April		
La7	Cable and satellite	25 May		

=== Conversions and rebrandings ===
Old network name	New network name	Type	Conversion Date	Notes	Source

=== Closures ===
Network	Type	Closure date	Notes	Source

== Awards ==
18. Telegatto award, for the season 2000–2001.

- Show of the year: Striscia la notizia (for Italy, awarded also as best satirical show).
- Man and woman of the year: Fiorello and Simona Ventura.
- Best TV movie: Padre Pio, tra cielo e terra.
- Best serial: Il bello delle donne (for Italy).
- Best soap opera: "Vivere".
- Best quiz: Chi vuol essere miliardario?.
- Best variety: Stasera pago io.
- Best talk show: C'è posta per te.
- Best music show: Festivalbar 2000.
- Best magazine: Verissimo.
- Best customs and culture show: Grande fratello.
- Best sport magazine: Novantesimo minuto.
- Best show for children: Disney club.
- Special prize: Novecento and Miss Italia.
- Special awards: Trenta ore per la vita (for the service TV), Mrs. Paola Tiziani (reader of Sorrisi e Canzoni), Elizabeth Taylor (lifetime achievement), Robert Wagner, Gigi Proietti and Sophia Loren.

== See also ==
- 2001 in Italy
- List of Italian films of 2001
