= Roberta Floris =

Italian journalist and television presenter

- Born: Roberta Floris; 27 April 1979 (age 47); Cagliari, Sardinia, Italy
- Education: Law
- Occupations: Journalist, television presenter and former model
- Height: 1.80 m (5 ft 10.87 in)
- Family: Roberta Floris; Lorenzo Flaherty; Emilio Floris; Mario Floris
- Website: Roberta Floris; Roberta Floris

Roberta Floris (born 27 April 1979 in Cagliari, Sardinia) is an Italian journalist, television presenter and former model.

== Biography ==
Roberta Floris was born on 27 April 1979 in Cagliari (Sardinia), to father Giorgio Floris and mother Caterina Placco and is the third of three daughters: one of whom is called Rosanna. Not to be confused with the homonymous cousin, Roberta Floris (wife of actor Lorenzo Flaherty and daughter of Senator Emilio Floris), and both are the granddaughters of the politician and trade unionist Mario Floris.

== Career ==
Roberta Floris attended high school at the Liceo classico Giovanni Maria Dettori in Cagliari. In 1998, finishing high school and obtaining a diploma, she decided to enroll in Law in the Faculty of Law at the University of Cagliari, obtaining her degree with a thesis entitled A constitutional right to quality television. She is enrolled in the register of the Sardinia journalists in the Professional category, since 19 June 2014, she became a professional journalist.

In 1997, she participated in the Miss Italia beauty pageant, where she was ranked fourth.

In 2008, after various television experiences, she started working in Sardinia as a journalist on TG1 for the regional broadcaster Sardegna Uno, where she leads and prepares the news; she signs in-depth services; she edited a weekly column and collaborated in the realization of the news, economic and political broadcast of the newspaper. Due to the results achieved during the year, the Sardegna Live editorial team decided to include Roberta among the candidates for the Sardegna Live Award in the category of the Sardinian of the year 2018.

In 2012, she moved to Rome, starting her national career. She started working for a private national broadcaster ABC, in the on which he conducted the TG33 and at the same time covered in which she covered the role of head of the institutional sector, taking care of the information space of a digital terrestrial channel, taking care of the press area and collaborating in the organization of events related to the world of communications.

Subsequently, she participated in the training course for professional journalists, organized by the National Order. She wrote articles on socio-economic, cultural and tourism-related issues, coordinating and moderating debates.

In 2013, she was chosen to conduct the public presentation of Pope Francis on the occasion of the pastoral visit to Sardinia. In the same year, she began to work at the Authority for Communications Guarantees, in the staff of the Commissioner for Infrastructures and Networks, Antonio Preto.

In 2016, she won the Pentapolis Award in the Journalists for sustainability category. On 19 September 2018 she was interviewed by Gigi Marzullo in the Sottovoce program, broadcast on Rai 1. In 2017 and 2018, she worked as a presenter and correspondent in the editorial staff of TgCom24. In 2018 and 2019, she hosted TG4 broadcast on Rete 4 and then from 2019 to 2021 she hosted Studio Aperto broadcast on Italia 1. At the same time, in addition to conducting Studio Aperto, she also held the role of correspondent.

In 2018, after moving to News Mediaset, she hosted a TG4 column entitled L'almanacco di Retequattro on Rete 4, with which she alternated weekly with Viviana Guglielmi. The column offered a whole series of services dedicated to food, well-being, climate, lifestyle and gossip. On 17 May 2019, she presented the final of the sixth edition of ContaminationLab, at the Massimo theatre in Cagliari. On 30 June of the same year, she made a report for L'arca di Noè, a TG5 column broadcast every Sunday at 1:40 pm on Canale 5. On 28 January 2020, she moderated the Caserme Verdi project in Cagliari.

From 2020, she was hired in the editorial staff of TG5 in Rome (where she had already worked in the editorial office in 2015 and 2016), under the direction of Clemente J. Mimum, where from 2020 she leads the TG5 Prima Pagina aired on Canale 5 and then again from 2020 she leads the 8:00 edition of TG5, while from 2020 to 2022 she also hosted the Flash edition on air at 10:50 a.m, while in 2022 she directed the 1:00 p.m. edition of TG5 and prior to this latest edition he also directed the Flash edition broadcast at 10:50 am. In addition to directing the news, she also holds the role of correspondent. In 2021 she was awarded the Féminas Prize in the Communication category.

In 2022, to celebrate the thirty years of TG5 history, January 15 she was interviewed together with her colleagues Simona Branchetti and Susanna Galeazzi in the Verissimo programme broadcast on Canale 5 with the conduct of Silvia Toffanin. On 28 May that year he led the award ceremony for the third edition of the Costa Smeralda Prize, at the Porto Cervo Congress Centre. The following 13 August she returned to Porto Cervo on the occasion of the celebrations of the sixty years of the Costa Smeralda.

== Television programmes ==
| Year | Programmes | Network |
|---|---|---|
| 1997 | Miss Italia | Rai 1 |
| 2008–2012 | TG1 | Sardegna Uno |
| 2012 | TG33 | ABC |
| 2018–2019 | TG4 | Rete 4 |
| 2018 | L'almanacco di Retequattro | Rete 4 |
| 2019–2021 | Studio Aperto | Italia 1 |
| 2019 | L'arca di Noè | Canale 5 |
| 2020–present | TG5 | Canale 5 |
| 2020–present | TG5 Prima Pagina | Canale 5 |
| 2020–2022 | TG5 Flash | Canale 5 |

== Newsrooms ==
| Year | Programs | Network |
|---|---|---|
| 2008–2012 | TG1 | Sardegna Uno |
| 2012 | TG33 | ABC |
| 2017–2018 | TgCom24 | |
| 2018–2019 | TG4 | Rete 4 |
| 2019–2021 | Studio Aperto | Italia 1 |
| 2015–2016, from 2020 | TG5 | Canale 5 |

== Awards and nominations ==
| Year | Award | Category |
|---|---|---|
| 2016 | Pentapolis Award | Journalists for Sustainability |
| 2018 | Sardegna Live Award | Sardinian of the year 2018 |
| 2021 | Fèminas Award | Communication |
