= Simona Branchetti =

Italian journalist and television presenter (born 1976)

- Born: Simona Branchetti; 15 August 1976 (age 49); Meldola, Forlì-Cesena, Emilia-Romagna, Italy
- Education: University of Bologna
- Occupations: Journalist and television presenter

Simona Branchetti (born 15 August 1976) is an Italian journalist and television presenter.

== Biography ==
She graduated in Law at the University of Bologna with a thesis in civil procedure. In 2002 she collaborated with the daily newspaper La Voce di Forlì and other local newspapers in Emilia-Romagna, obtaining the certificate of professional journalist in 2005.

Alongside the newspapers, she is present in some entertainment programs of Odeon TV, Happy Channel and TMC. In October 2002 she arrived at Stream TV, working in the editorial staff of the in-depth program (Focus) Agrinews and the news program StreamNews.

From 2003 to 2007 she worked for the editorial staff of Sky TG24, where she hosted the afternoon news program together with Marco Congiu and the meteorological analysis column Bel tempo si spera, of which she was also the author.

Since October 2007 she has been employed in the Rome editorial office of TG5 broadcast on Canale 5. She started as a presenter of the morning edition and since 2008 she has hosted the 1:00 pm edition, first together with the journalist Giuseppe Brindisi and then alone since 2009. In the editorial office she deals with current affairs and topics related to well-being, medicine and health.

In 2020 she published her first book, Donne è arrivato lo smart working, published by Edizioni Leima.

From 26 July 2021 to 22 September 2023, he hosted the morning program Morning News, a spin-off of Mattino Cinque, on Canale 5. From 20 December 2021 to 14 January 2022, he hosted the program Pomeriggio Cinque News, a spin-off of Pomeriggio Cinque, on Canale 5.

In 2022, to celebrate thirty years of history of TG5, she was interviewed together with her colleagues Roberta Floris and Susanna Galeazzi in the program Verissimo broadcast on Canale 5 and hosted by Silvia Toffanin. On 9 October 2022, she was the victim of the program Scherzi a parte, hosted by Enrico Papi. In October 2022, she received the Italian TV Awards presented during the Rome Film Festival. In January 2023, at the Campidoglio in Rome, she won the "Golden Antenna for TV" Award.

From 17 June 2024 she returned to host the program Pomeriggio Cinque News on Canale 5, a spin-off of Pomeriggio Cinque. On 25 October 2024 she replaced Myrta Merlino as host of Pomeriggio Cinque.

== Personal life ==
From 2008 to 2013 she was married to the television and radio host Federico Quaranta. In 2016 she began dating the lawyer Carlo Longari, with whom she married the following year, and then separated in 2021.

== Television programs ==
| Year | Title | Network | | Role |
|---|---|---|---|---|
| 2002 | (Focus) Agrinews | Stream TV | | Conductor |
| 2002 | StreamNews | Stream TV | | Conductor |
| 2003–2007 | Sky TG24 | Sky TG24 | | Conductor |
| 2007–present | TG5 | Canale 5 | | Conductor |
| 2021–2023 | Morning News | Canale 5 | TGcom24 | Conductor |
| 2021–2022, 2024 | Pomeriggio Cinque News | Canale 5 | TGcom24 | Conductor |
| 2024 | Pomeriggio Cinque | Canale 5 | TGcom24 | Conductor |

== Works ==
- Branchetti, Simona (2020). Donne è arrivato lo smart working. Edizioni Leima. ISBN 978-88-32290-04-2.

== Awards and nominations ==
| Year | Award | Results | Notes |
|---|---|---|---|
| 2023 | "Golden Antenna for TV" Award | Won | |
