= 2011 in Italian television =

This is a list of Italian television related events from 2011.

== Events ==
- 4 February – Viacom (the American company that owns Nickelodeon) becomes a co-owner of the Italian television studio Rainbow S.p.A. after purchasing a 30% stake.
- 18 April – Andrea Cocco wins the eleventh season of Grande Fratello.
- 30 April – Il Commissario Rex actor Kaspar Capparoni and his partner Yulia Musikhina win the seventh season of Ballando con le stelle.
- 11 June – 48-year-old painter Fabrizio Vendramin wins the second season of Italia's Got Talent.

== Debuts ==
=== International ===
- 14 February – /Floopaloo, Where Are You? (RAI/France Télévisions) (2011‐2016)
- 19 October – /Octonauts (Disney Junior) (2010–present)

== shows ==
=== RAI ===
==== Drama ====
- Atelier Fontana, le sorelle della moda ("Fashion sisters") – biopic by Riccardo Milani, with Alessandra Mastonardi, Anna Valle and Federica De Cola as Micol, Zoe and Giovanna Fontana; 2 episodes.
- Tiberio Mitri, il campione e la miss ("The champ and the miss") – biopic by Angelo Longoni, with Luca Argentero in the title role and Martina Stella as Fulvia Franco; 2 episodes. The airing of the movie is delayed of six months, for a lawsuit by the Mitri's family.

==== Miniseries ====
- Il segreto dell'acqua ("The secret of the water") – by Renato De Maria, with Riccardo Scamarcio and Valentina Lodovini; 6 episodes. An edgy policeman investigates the Mafia traffic of drinking water in Palermo, in which his family too is involved.

==== News and educational ====
- La mala del Brenta, la vera storia ("Mala del Brenta, the true story") – documentary by Nicola Prosatore, two episodes.
- Tutta un'altra storia ("Another story at all") – care of Andrea Camilleri. Eight famous writers, from Camilleri himself to Giancarlo De Cataldo tells the history of Italy since 1861.
- Sostiene Bollani ("Bollani Maintains") – mix of variety and educational program about music, both classic and popular, hosted by the pianist Stefano Bollani, with Caterina Guzzanti as constant guest; two seasons.

=== 2000s ===
- Grande Fratello (2000–present)
- Ballando con le stelle (2005–present)
- X Factor (2008–present)

=== 2010s ===
- Italia's Got Talent (2010–present)

== Networks and services ==
=== Launches ===
Network	Type	Launch date	Notes	Source
Radio Italia TV	Cable and satellite	Unknown		
Udinese Channel	Cable and satellite	Unknown		
ME	Cable and satellite	1 March		
MTV Music	Cable and satellite	1 March		
Sky 3D	Cable and satellite	6 September		
Sky Sport 24 HD	Cable and satellite	24 September		
Sky Uno HD	Cable and satellite	20 October		
DMAX	Cable and satellite	10 November		
TgCom24	Cable and satellite	28 November		

=== Conversions and rebrandings ===
Old network name	New network name	Type	Conversion Date	Notes	Source
Hallmark Channel	Diva Universal	Cable and satellite	31 March		
ME	For You	Cable and satellite	6 June		

=== Closures ===
Network	Type	Closure date	Notes	Source
MTV Brand New	Cable and satellite	10 January		
MTV Pulse	Cable and satellite	10 January		
Dahlia TV	Cable and satellite	25 February		
MediaShopping	Cable and satellite	1 March		
MTV Plus	Cable and satellite	1 March		
Cooltoon	Cable and satellite	1 April		
FX	Cable and satellite	1 July		
Mediaset Plus	Cable and satellite	2 July		
Hiro	Cable and satellite	1 August		

== See also ==
- 2011 in Italy
- List of Italian films of 2011
