= Giovanni Allevi =

Italian pianist and composer

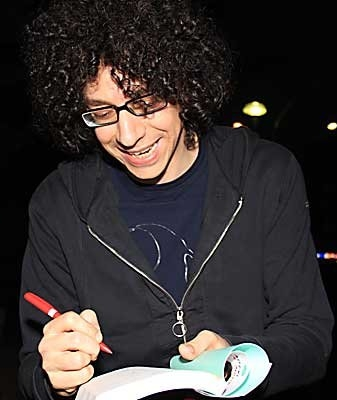

Background information
- Born: Giovanni Allevi; 9 April 1969 (age 57); Ascoli Piceno, Italy
- Origin: Ascoli Piceno, Italy
- Genres: Contemporary classical music
- Occupations: Soloist; Composer
- Instrument: Piano
- Years active: 1997–present
- Website: http://www.giovanniallevi.it

Giovanni Allevi (Italian pronunciation: [dʒoˈvanni alˈlɛːvi]; born 9 April 1969) is an Italian pianist and composer. His song "O Generosa" is the current theme tune of the top flight of Italian football, Serie A.

== Biography ==
=== Education ===
Allevi attained a first-class diploma both in piano at the "F. Morlacchi" conservatoire in Perugia and in composition at the Milan Conservatory. He graduated cum laude in philosophy with a thesis entitled "Il vuoto nella Fisica contemporanea" (The Void in Contemporary Physics) and he attended the Accademia Internazionale di Alto Perfezionamento in Arezzo, under maestro Carlo Alberto Neri.

In 1991, he did military service in the Italian Army Music Band. The master of the band noticed his piano talent and decided to put the piano soloist in his "inventory." He played the Rhapsody in Blue by George Gershwin and the Warsaw Concerto by Richard Addinsell in his capacity as the piano soloist of the Banda during a tour in numerous Italian theatres. At the end of his military service, Allevi started presenting in concert a repertory formed exclusively of his own compositions for pianoforte while at the same time attending courses of "Bio-music and music therapy" by professor Mario Corradini, in which he enhanced his awareness of music's great power of "setting minds free" and its ability to evoke memories, images and emotions.

In 1996, he set to music the tragedy The Trojan Women by Euripides, performed on the occasion of the International Festival of the Ancient Drama in Siracusa. It won a special prize for the "best scene music."

In 1997, he won the international selections for young concert performers at the San Filippo Theatre in Turin.

He received the America Award of the Italy-USA Foundation in 2017.

In 2021, he received the title of ambassador of Japanese culture on behalf of Kagoshima prefecture becoming the first non-Japanese to receive this recognition.

=== Encountering Saturnino and Jovanotti ===
Thanks to Saturnino, Giovanni Allevi matures the idea of moving to Milan and to gather into one CD his own piano production; this work is picked up by Lorenzo Cherubini, stage name Jovanotti, who, in 1997, under his label Soleluna and together with Universal Italia, decides to publish Allevi's first album, by the title of 13 Dita (13 Fingers) and produced by Saturnino. He also provided the music at the opening ceremony of the 2009 World Aquatics Championships in Rome.

As a result of Allevi's encounter with Saturnino and Jovanotti, he faces the large audiences of modern rock concerts: Allevi opens, with his piano alone, Jovanotti's concerts during the tour L'Albero, executing a few tracks from 13 Dita.

In 1998, again with Saturnino as the producer, Allevi creates the soundtrack for the short film Venceremos, awarded at the Sundance Film Festival, a film festival that takes place annually in the state of Utah, in the United States.

=== Non-piano work ===
Giovanni Allevi has written some non-piano works, in addition to his piano compositions, which are mostly unpublished. The most important are:

- Inno delle Marche (Hymn of the Marche region) - Orchestral work for the Marche Italian region, commissioned in occasion of a youths meeting promoted by the Italian Church in Loreto (2007).
- Angelo Ribelle (Rebel Angel) - Suite for string orchestra, written in five movements. The premiere was executed by the Virtuosi Italiani orchestra on 9 March 2007, at the Teatro nuovo in Verona, under the conduction of Allevi. It was published in his 2008 album Evolution.
- 300 Anelli (300 Rings) - Work for piano and orchestra (strings, winds and harp) composed in two movements (the first without the piano). The premiere was executed on 4 August 2007 for the "I suoni delle Dolomiti" season, by the Virtuosi Italiani orchestra with Allevi on the piano and conductor. It was published in Evolution.
- Foglie di Beslan (Beslan's leaves) - Work for piano and symphony orchestra written to commemorate the Beslan massacre. The premiere was executed on 29 April 2005 at the Metropolitan theatre in Palermo, by Allevi himself at the piano with the Orchestra sinfonica Siciliana directed by Daniel Kawka. It was published as the first track of the album Evolution.
- Sparpagghiò - Musical comedy for orchestra (22 players) and choir, under the direction of Gianni Lattanzi. The first execution was held on 9 February 2001 at the Ventidio Basso theatre in Ascoli Piceno. The orchestra was directed by Allevi himself.

=== The concert at the Senate ===
On 21 December 2008, Allevi directed "I virtuosi Italiani" symphony orchestra at the Christmas concert at Senate House. The audience included the likes of Giorgio Napolitano, the president of the Republic, and other high-ranking State officers. Along with two pieces by Giacomo Puccini, five compositions by Allevi himself were played. The concert was broadcast live on RAI1, the main national television channel, establishing his fame and success in the national music scene.

=== Criticism ===
The concert at the Senate hall inspired a strong debate on Allevi's actual talent: the celebrated violinist Uto Ughi strongly criticized the artist in an article that appeared in the newspaper La Stampa. Ughi clearly felt "offended as a musician" and declared "Allevi's success is the triumph of relativism".

Allevi retorted later in the same newspaper, accusing Ughi of "defending the caste", adding: "my music speaks to people's hearts but its technical and rhythmical virtuosity requires highly-talented performers". He noted that "in music, it has always been difficult for new ideas to gain a hold, but later on, they became the rule to follow".

Allevi is often accused of being simply a mass media phenomenon, nothing but the "result of a marketing strategy", as Piero Maranghi, director of Classica, a television channel fully dedicated to classical music, said. Marcello Filotei, journalist at the Osservatore Romano notes that "Allevi is the stereotyped representation of the composer, as anybody not familiar with concert halls expects him to be". Allevi is also criticized for his conceit (he defines his music as a "visionary project" for "establishing the basis for a new cultured contemporary music").

Other musicians plead Allevi's cause, recalling that "his success gave a new birth to the piano, and encouraged many young to take piano lessons. In this debates I see only envy" as the pianist Nazzareno Carusi said to Panorama.

Italian piano player Loredana Brigandi has also been a highly outspoken critic of the artist.

=== Books ===
La Musica in Testa, his first book was published on March 5, 2008. It's a diary which collects his thoughts, his experiences and the anecdotes until his success.

=== Private life and health state ===
Allevi said he has always suffered from panic attacks, depression, anxiety disorder, and he has Asperger syndrome. He is married and he has two sons. In 2017, during a concert in Japan, he had a retinal detachment. In 2022, the musician announced that he was suffering from cancer, a multiple myeloma.

== Discography ==
=== Studio albums/CD ===
- 13 Dita (1997)
- Composizioni (2003)
- No Concept (2005)
- Joy (2006)
- Evolution (13 June 2008)
- Alien (28 September 2010)
- Sunrise (30 October 2012)
- Christmas for You (19 November 2013)
- Love (20 January 2015)
- Equilibrium (20 October 2017)

=== Live ===
- Allevilive (2007)

=== Concerts/DVD ===
- Joy tour 2007 (2007)
- Allevi & All Star Orchestra Arena di Verona (2009)

=== Collection ===
- Allevi All (2008)
- Giovanni Allevi 2005–2008
- Il nuotatore (2009)
- Secret Love (2012)
- The Very Best Of (2018)

== Musical editions ==
- No Concept, piano score, Carisch, Milano 2006, ISBN 978-88-507-0959-5
- Joy, piano score, Carisch, Milano 2007, ISBN 978-88-507-1143-7
- Giovanni Allevi for Guitar, score composed for up to four guitars, Carisch, Milano 2007, ISBN 978-88-507-1461-2 (contains the transcription of the following pieces for the guitar: Aria, Come Sei Veramente, Downtown, Go With The Flow, Il bacio, Panic, Panic (arrangiamento per 4 chitarre)
- Alien, piano score, Carisch, Milano 2011, ISBN 978-88-507-2094-1
- Secret Love (The Best of), piano score, Carisch, Milano 2012, ISBN 978-88-507-2512-0
- La Danza Della Strega, orchestral score reduced for piano and violin, Carisch, Milano 2012, ISBN 978-88-507-2618-9
- Pianoforte a quattro mani, four-hands piano score, Carisch, Milano 2008, ISBN 978-88-507-1276-2 (it contains the transcription of the following pieces for the four-hands piano: Back to life, Come sei veramente, Vento d'Europa, Jazzmatic)
