= Giuseppe Brindisi =

Italian journalist and television presenter (born 1976)

- Born: Giuseppe Brindisi; 7 June 1962 (age 64); Modugno, Bari, Apulia, Italy
- Education: University of Bari
- Occupations: Journalist and television presenter
- Height: 1.90 m (6 ft 3 in)

Giuseppe Brindisi (born 7 June 1962) is an Italian journalist and television presenter.

== Biography ==
Born in 1962 in Modugno, Bari, Giuseppe Brindisi began working in the entertainment and radio fields as a DJ and radio speaker in Apulia at a very young age; he later studied Political science at the University of Bari, working at the same time as a sports journalist for some private radio stations in Bari.

In September 1990 he arrived on television, making his debut as a correspondent from Puglia for the sports editorial team of Pressing, a sports magazine broadcast at the time on Italia 1. In 1991 he left Bari and moved to Milan to join the sports editorial team of Videonews (a newspaper independent of the three Mediaset news programs, which at the time only covered sports) as a journalist, and obtained two roles: correspondent for Pressing and host of the Italia 1 sports news program Studio Sport. In 1993 he moved to the editorial team of Studio Aperto (at the time directed by Vittorio Corona and then by Paolo Liguori), where he hosted all the editions of the news program. In 2000 (under the direction of Paolo Liguori and then by Mario Giordano), he became the editor-in-chief of the Rome editorial team of Studio Aperto, a position he held until 2001.

In 2001 he moved to TG5 where he took on the role of head of the Internet editorial team and then over the years he first hosted the night edition and then the daytime edition at 1:00 pm (first with various partners, then as a single host); his commitment with TG5 lasted until November 2011 with only one interruption: in fact in 2005, from 12 September to 23 December, the then director of TG5 Carlo Rossella appointed Brindisi host of Verissimo (in that period broadcast in the afternoon daytime weekdays from Monday to Friday) together with Benedetta Corbi in place of Cristina Parodi; the Brindisi-Corbi duo was then removed from hosting due to low ratings: in fact from 9 January 2006 Verissimo passed to Paola Perego, while Brindisi and Corbi returned to TG5 to host the daytime edition 13:00 (paired or hosted individually) in the following years. As a presenter of TG5, in 2009 he made a brief appearance in the second episode of the fifth season of the series R.I.S. - Delitti imperfetti, entitled Libri pericolo.

In November 2011, together with Benedetta Corbi and others, after many years spent in Rome, he returned to Milan to join the new newspaper News Mediaset (at that time directed by Mario Giordano, who later became director of TG4 from January 2014), because he became one of the presenters of the news programs and columns of TGcom24.

In July 2013 he moved to TG4 (at that time directed by Giovanni Toti) as host of the evening edition at 6.55 pm and as editor-in-chief. At the same time as these commitments, in the 2013-2014 television season (from September to June), he hosted Dentro la notizia (an in-depth programme in the late evening produced by TG4) on Rete 4; in autumn 2014 he returned to host the new edition of Dentro la notizia, but the director of TG4 Mario Giordano had to cancel this second edition of the news programme because the ratings had fallen below the average ratings of Rete 4 and so Brindisi remained at TG4 as host of the evening edition and editor-in-chief. On 2 April 2018, after almost five years, he temporarily abandoned the hosting of the 6.55pm edition of TG4 (which he, however, returned to hosting from the autumn of the same year until 13 January 2024).

From 3 August to 4 September 2015 he hosted Dalla vostra parte... anche d'estate, the summer version of Dalla tua parte, replacing Paolo Del Debbio, obtaining an excellent response from the public; he also hosted the episode of 25 March 2016 of the program Dalla tua parte in place of Del Debbio.

From 9 April 2018 to 27 October 2019, together with Veronica Gentili, he hosted the program Stasera Italia (heir to Dalla vostra parte) at 8:30 pm on Rete 4, initially from Monday to Friday and then in the 2018-2019 season only on weekends with Stasera Italia - Weekend and in the summer with Stasera Italia - Estate, while in the 2019-2020 season (until 27 October 2019) only on weekends with Stasera Italia - Weekend.

Since April 7, 2021, he has hosted a new news and current affairs program broadcast in prime time on Rete 4, entitled Zona bianca. Since 2022, he has become deputy director of the Videonews newspaper. From January 15 to September 6, 2024, again on Rete 4, he hosted the TG4 column entitled Diario del giorno. On February 7 and 8, March 22, April 5, May 2 and 3, 2024, he replaced Myrta Merlino as host of Pomeriggio Cinque. On November 6, 2024, he hosted the afternoon special on Rete 4 The President, a spin-off of Zona bianca dedicated to the presidential elections in the United States.

== Television programs ==
Year	Title	Network	Role
1990–1993	Pressing	Italia 1	Sent
1991–1993	Studio Sport	Italia 1	Conductor
1993–2001	Studio Aperto	Italia 1	Conductor
1997	Le Iene	Italia 1	Author
2001–2011	TG5	Canale 5	Conductor
2005	Verissimo	Canale 5	Conductor
2011–2013	TGcom24	TGcom24	Conductor
2013–2024	TG4	Rete 4	Conductor
2013–2018	Dentro la notizia	Rete 4	Conductor
2018, 2021–2024	Pomeriggio Cinque	Canale 5	Opinionist (2018); Analyst (2021–2023); Conductor (2024)
2015–2016	Dalla vostra parte	Rete 4	Conductor
2018–2019	Stasera Italia	Rete 4	Conductor
2018–2019	Stasera Italia - Weekend	Rete 4	Conductor
2019	Stasera Italia - Estate	Rete 4	Conductor
2021–present	Zona bianca	Rete 4	Conductor
2024	Diario del giorno	Rete 4	Conductor
2024	The President	Rete 4	Conductor

== Filmography ==
=== Actor ===
==== Television ====
Year	Title	Network	Notes
2009	R.I.S. - Delitti imperfetti	Canale 5	TV series, episode 5x2, directed by Fabio Tagliavia
