= Elisabetta Ripa =

Italian businesswoman

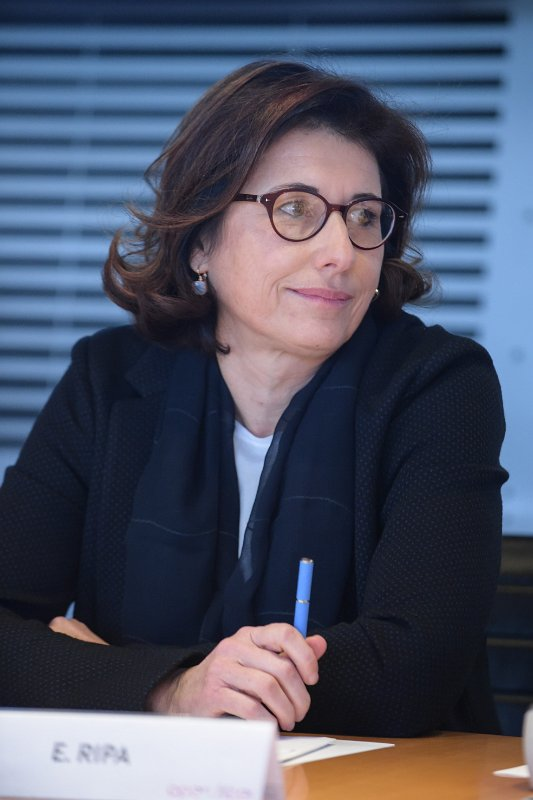
- Born: 1965 (age 60–61); Turin, Italy
- Education: Sapienza University of Rome, INSEAD
- Occupation: Businesswoman
- Title: CEO, Enel X Way

Elisabetta Ripa (Turin, 20 November 1965) is an Italian businesswoman, CEO of Enel X Way since April 2022 and Advisory board of IAB Italia, a consultative body established to promote digital culture. As a successful Manager, Forbes included her among the 100 most successful Italian women in 2019.

== Education ==
Born in Turin, she graduated in Economics and Business at the Sapienza University of Rome. She then completed her studies at INSEAD in Fontainebleau.

== Career ==
In 1988 she started her career working for an advertising agency. In 1990 she joined SIP, where she held the position of Head of Strategic Planning for Mobile Services. Five years later, in 1995, she contributed to the creation of TIM and in 1998 she was entrusted with the management and international development of this mobile company. In 2005, after the merger between Telecom Italia and TIM, she became Head of Strategic Marketing, and then Head of the Institutional Investors Relationship Office for the TLC Group. In 2011, she was appointed Head of Sector Customer for TIM Mobile Services Department.
In 2013 she was appointed CEO of Telecom Italia Sparkle, a company with a network of more than 500,000 km of fiber-optic cables, mostly submarine, used for communications between Italy, the US, North Africa and the Middle East, intertwining in all directions. Under her leadership, Sparkle launched innovative solutions for SMEs and the corporate sector as a whole. In the same period, Sparkle also received two acknowledgments at the Global Carrier Awards 2014: "Best OTT partnership" and "Best Latin American project". In 2015 she moved to South America where she served as CEO of Telecom Argentina Group, the main telecommunication and digital services operator in the country. The project to expand the 4G/LTE network on the national territory was then launched. In 2016, she coordinated the project to sell off the company to Fintech Group.

=== Open Fiber ===
After being appointed member of the Board of Directors of Open Fiber in January 2017, Elisabetta Ripa came back to Italy. The objective of the new company was to create a fully fiber-optic network infrastructure (FTTH) covering the entire Italian territory. In January 2018, she became CEO of the company, owned 50% by Enel and 50% by Cassa Depositi e Prestiti bringing to Open Fiber her experience as former Telecom Italia Manager. On 14 February 2018, she received the FTTH Council Award, in Valencia, awarded by Open Fiber as "a young and dynamic business, operating as an innovative element on the Italian Market investing in FTTH massively".
In April 2018, Open Fiber approved the 2018–27 business plan with 6.5 billion euros of investments in fiber optic, also thanks to the financing agreement signed with BNP Paribas, Société Générale and UniCredit. The project involves 271 cities and 7 thousand municipalities, from Turin to Catania, at a pace of more than 2.5 million building units per year. In August, a loan was underwritten by a group of banks, EIB and Cassa Depositi e Prestiti. The biggest structured finance transaction in the Europe-Middle East-Africa region for the development of a fiber-optic network.
In October 2018 Elisabetta Ripa joined, together with Ferruccio de Bortoli and Antonio Campo Dall'Orto, the Advisory board of IAB Italia, an organization established by interactive advertising operators to promote digital culture.

In September 2020, the Open Fiber project to create a fully fiber-optic ultra-broadband network to connect more than 6,000 Italian municipalities was supported by Nokia. The agreement signed between Open Fiber and the Finnish multinational company confirms the shared intention to speed up the spread of FTTH technology in Italy.

=== Enel X Way ===
In November 2021 she was appointed director of Enel's Global e-Mobility division. In April 2022, the division changed its name to Enel X Way, the new global business line of the Enel Group created to promote electric mobility, of which she was appointed CEO.

== Positions held ==
On 22 February 2018 Ripa joined the Presidency Council of Asstel as a member.

On May 27, 2021, she entered the Board of Directors of Telenor: the new assignment of Elisabetta Ripa has immediate effect and a duration of two years. Telenor is a Norwegian telecommunications company with 14 billion euros in turnover whose revenues are made in Scandinavia and in the Middle East.

== Honours ==
In 2019 Elisabetta Ripa was awarded a "Mela d’Oro" (Golden Apple) for the "Marisa Bellisario" Award in the "Management" category. In the same year, she was among the personalities from the world of finance, economy, arts and culture who won the Italia Informa Award.
