= Italy–USA Foundation =

Italian-American organization

Italy–USA Foundation (Italian: Fondazione Italia USA) is a non-profit non-partisan organization based in Rome, Italy, established to promote friendship between Italians and Americans plus American culture in Italy.

== Organization ==
The foundation's president is Mauro della Porta Raffo, and its Vice Presidents are Emilio Carelli, Gabriella Giammanco, Dario Stefano and Gianpaolo Vallardi. The Secretary General and founder is Corrado Maria Daclon. The President of the Scientific Committee is Alain Elkann, the Vice Presidents of the Scientific Committee are Stefania Giannini and Franco Bassanini, and the Secretary of the Scientific Committee is Antonio Martino.

== Activities ==
The foundation organizes meetings between Italian members of Parliament and US Senators and Representatives to discuss legislation and cultural issues; these include meetings with American Legislative Exchange Council (ALEC) members. The foundation cooperates with many American universities, like John Cabot University and Loyola University Chicago through the John Felice Rome Center, for projects, conferences, staging. The scientific committee consists of more than 30 members, including some Italian scientists, politicians, diplomats, and journalists, for example Paolo Mieli, Stefania Giannini, Vincenzo Camporini, Fiamma Nirenstein, Aurelio De Laurentiis, Giuliano da Empoli, Beatrice Trussardi, Mario Capecchi, Giampaolo Di Paola, Carlo Cracco, Giulio Tremonti, Carlo Scognamiglio, Francesco Paolo Fulci, Edward Luttwak, Dante Ferretti, Antonio Marzano, Carla Fendi, Antonio Martino, Alessandro Minuto-Rizzo, Carlo Rubbia, Margherita Missoni, Carlo Pelanda. The Director of the Scientific Committee is Emilio Iodice, a former American diplomat, best-selling author, professor and business leader. The foundation is a member of the United Nations Academic Impact and also promotes the Leadership per le relazioni internazionali e il Made in Italy Master's degree, directed by the former minister Stefania Giannini.

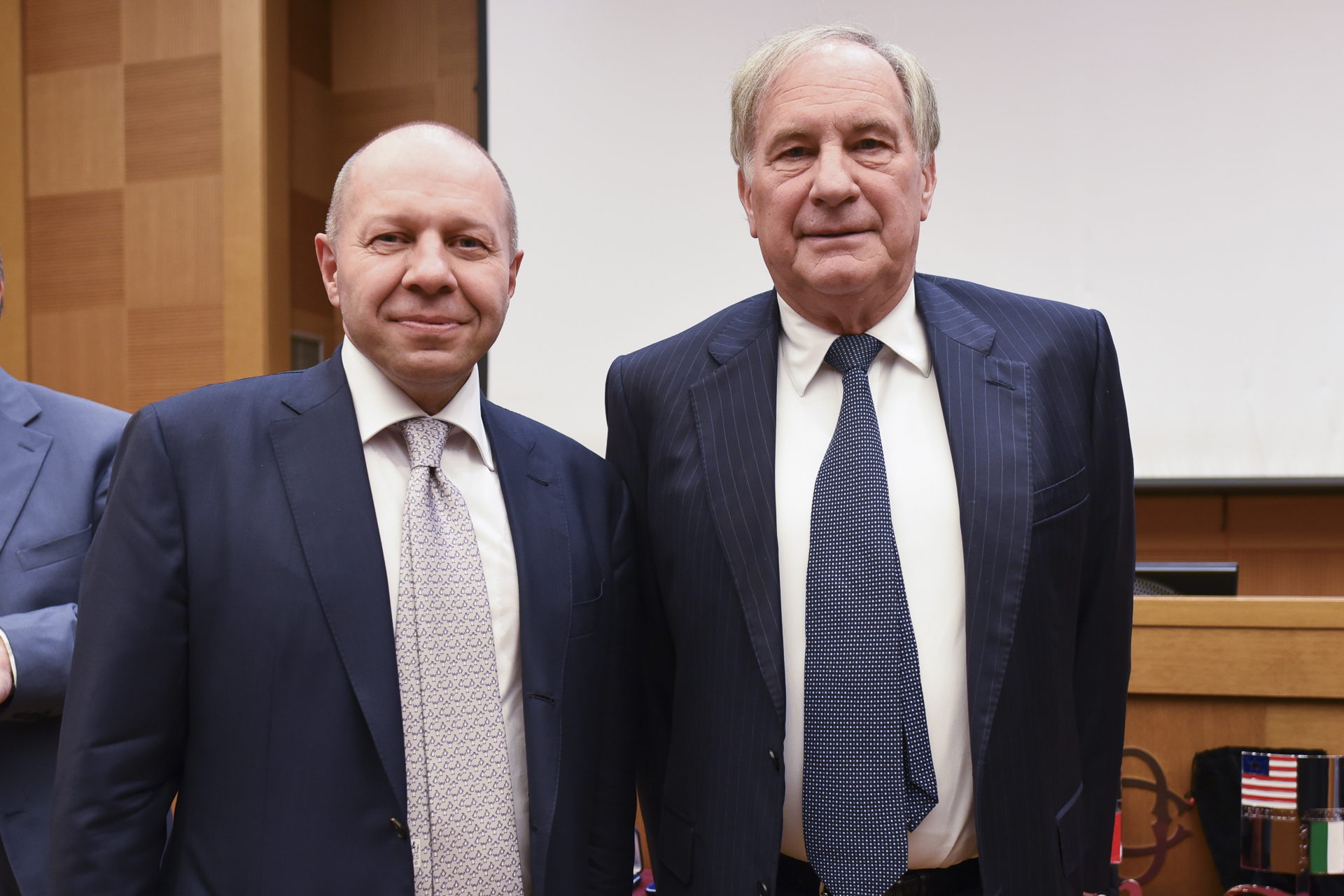
US Ambassador to Italy John Phillips with Secretary General of the Italy-USA Foundation Corrado Maria Daclon

President Barack Obama sent to the Secretary General of the Foundation, at the end of his presidency, a letter to thank the Foundation for the support since his 2008 campaign and election: "Michelle and I have many fond memories of our visits to Italy during the Administration, and we are touched by your and the Italy-USA Foundation's support and inspired by the work."

== America Award ==
The Italy–USA Foundation promote yearly in Italy the America Award (Italian: Premio America), a recognition under the auspices of the President of the Italian Republic. The award is mainly seen as a means to acknowledge and encourage initiatives and work aimed at favoring relationships between Europe and the United States of America. Clearly famous, eminent figures that have distinguished themselves in their work and have achieved the utmost excellence in their respective fields of interested and activities, are considered.

=== Ceremony ===
The ceremony is held in Rome, Italy, at Chamber of Deputies, the Italian Parliament. The Italy–USA Foundation, in the frame of the America Award, also confer three sterling silver medals of the President of the Chamber of Deputies to three students of American universities. The prize is an exclusive work of art in sterling silver, rose bronze and palladium, representing a Caravel with the American flag.

=== Laureates ===
Among the winners Andrea Bocelli, Dino De Laurentiis, Walter Veltroni, Herman Van Rompuy, Umberto Paolucci, Pier Francesco Guarguaglini, Umberto Veronesi, Antonio Campo Dall'Orto, Ennio Morricone, Franco Frattini, Rinaldo Petrignani, Maria Grazia Cucinotta, Luciano Pavarotti, Igor Man, Luisa Todini, Paolo Limiti, Piero Fassino, Renzo Arbore, Justine Mattera, Renato Balestra, Massimo Ferragamo, Antonio Di Bella, Emilio Carelli, Alain Elkann, Oriana Fallaci, Emma Bonino, Laura Biagiotti, Mike Bongiorno, Maria Laura Baccarini, Franca Sozzani, Jeremy Rifkin, Peter F. Secchia, Carlo Rossella, Maria Grazia Cucinotta, Edward Luttwak, Alison Smale, Jo Champa, Lapo Elkann, Paul Bremer, Gianni Riotta, Guido Damiani, Oscar Farinetti, Alan Friedman, Gianni Versace, Gianni Letta, Roberta Pinotti, Margherita Missoni, Mel Sembler, Frank Joseph Guarini, Sergio Leone, Frank Sinatra, Gabriella Pession, Paolo Nespoli, Vittorio Zucconi, Mario Moretti Polegato, Mario Andretti, Nicola Bulgari, Stefania Giannini, Uto Ughi, Kathryn Iacocca, Tony Renis, Lucia Annunziata, Ronald Spogli, George Lombardi, Bebe Vio, Joe Bastianich, Alberta Ferretti, Filippo Magnini, Silvio Garattini, Valentina Cervi, Federico Marchetti (businessman), Bruno Vespa, Alessandro Benetton, Dario Franceschini, Christian De Sica, Antonin Scalia, John R. Phillips (attorney), Anders Fogh Rasmussen, Veronica Mainetti, Gualtiero Marchesi, Giovanni Allevi, Luca Cordero di Montezemolo, Alberto Angela, Nerio Alessandri, Marco Bussetti, Emanuele Filiberto of Savoy, Prince of Venice, Maria Latella, Danny Quinn, Brunello Cucinelli, José María Aznar, Curtis Scaparrotti, Carlo Cracco, Ilaria Capua, Luca Maestri, Jean Claude Trichet, Alessandro Minuto Rizzo, Massimo Bottura, Valentina Vezzali, Umberto Guidoni, José Manuel Barroso, Ronn Moss, Luca Parmitano, Jean Todt.

== Prosecution of Amanda Knox ==
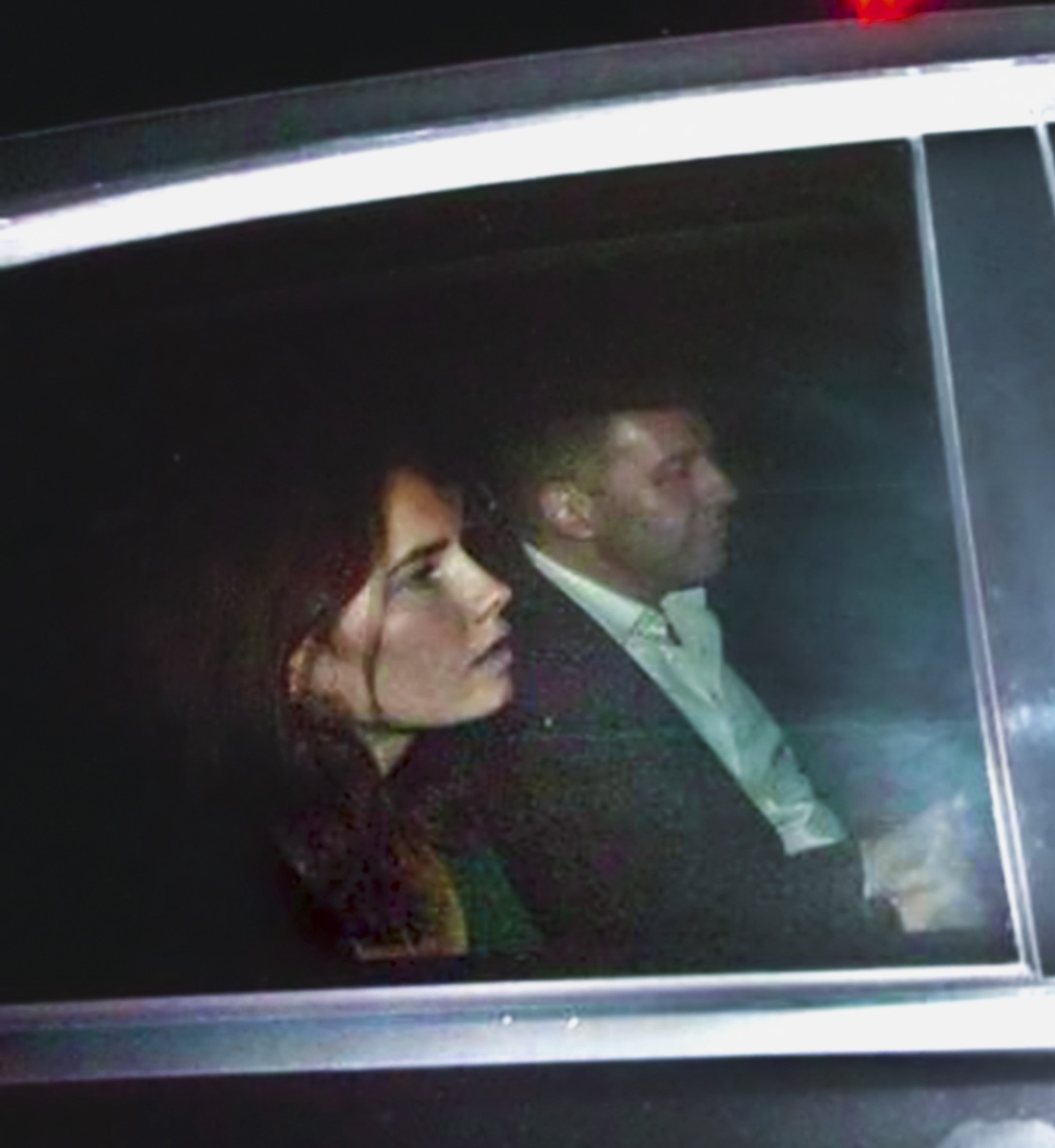
Amanda Knox leaving the prison in Perugia in a car with Corrado Maria Daclon, secretary general of the Italy–USA Foundation (2011)

A delegation of the Foundation met on Sunday December 13, 2009, in Capanne prison on the outskirts of Perugia, with American prisoner Amanda Knox, and then campaigned for her until the acquittal verdict. The Secretary General of the Foundation, Corrado Maria Daclon, who became a close friend of Knox's while she was in prison, managed Knox's departure from the penitentiary of Perugia to the airport after the acquittal, when Knox returned to her home in Seattle.

Knox wrote a letter to Corrado Maria Daclon the day after she was freed by prison, with her first words since she regaining freedom: "To hold my hand and offer support and respect throughout the obstacles and the controversy, there were Italians. There was the Italy–USA Foundation, and many others that shared my pain and that helped me survive, with hope. I am eternally grateful for their caring hospitality and their courageous commitment. To those that wrote me, that defended me, that stood by me, that prayed for me. I am forever grateful to you. I love you."
