= Dario Maltese =

Dario Maltese may refer to:

- Dario Maltese (born 1977), Italian journalist and television presenter
- Dario Maltese (born 1992), Italian footballer
