= Régiment d'honneur =

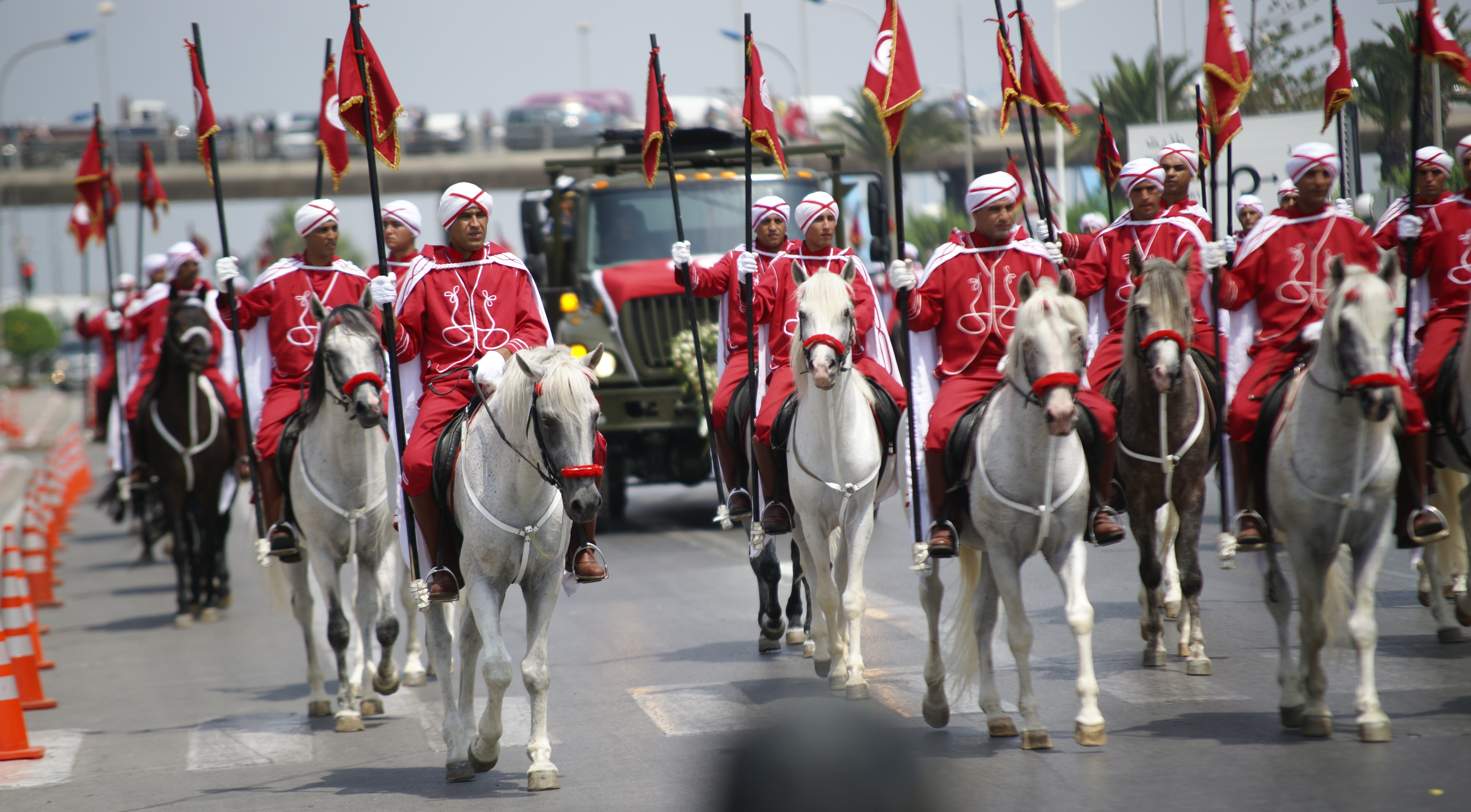
- The cavalry of the regiment during the state funeral of Béji Caïd Essebsi in 2019.
- Active: 1963; 62 years ago
- Country: Tunisia
- Allegiance: President of Tunisia
- Branch: Tunisian Army
- Type: Honor Guard
- Role: Public duties
- Size: 3 sub-units
- Headquarters: Tunis

Commanders
- Current commander: Colonel Fathi Ben Anaya

The Régiment d'honneur de l'armée nationale (Honour Regiment of the National Army) is a special unit of the Tunisian National Army. It is responsible for the rendering of military honors at official ceremonies and the perpetuation of the Tunisian equestrian tradition. It can also be of an operational nature, serving in the event of a flood or earthquake during which it provides military police. In its current role, it serves as a Household Division-like service for the President of Tunisia. Since 2016, it has been led by Colonel Fathi Ben Anaya.

== History and organization ==
The current regiment of honor is the heir of the first cavalry brigade created by Ahmad I ibn Mustafa in 1840, consisting of 3,000 men; with the brass band having been created in the royal court of the beys. This regiment disappeared during the era of the French protectorate of Tunisia, and was reborn after it gained independence in 1963, with an enlargement of its functions in 1965. The regiment marched during the opening ceremony of the 2004 Africa Cup of Nations. During the 2011 Tunisian Revolution, the regiment of honor carried out field missions in defense of the capital. The regiment was invited to France to take part in the 70th anniversary of the Normandy landings in Caen in June 2014. At the end of July 2019, the regiment escorted the funeral procession of the late President Béji Caïd Essebsi, who died earlier in the month.

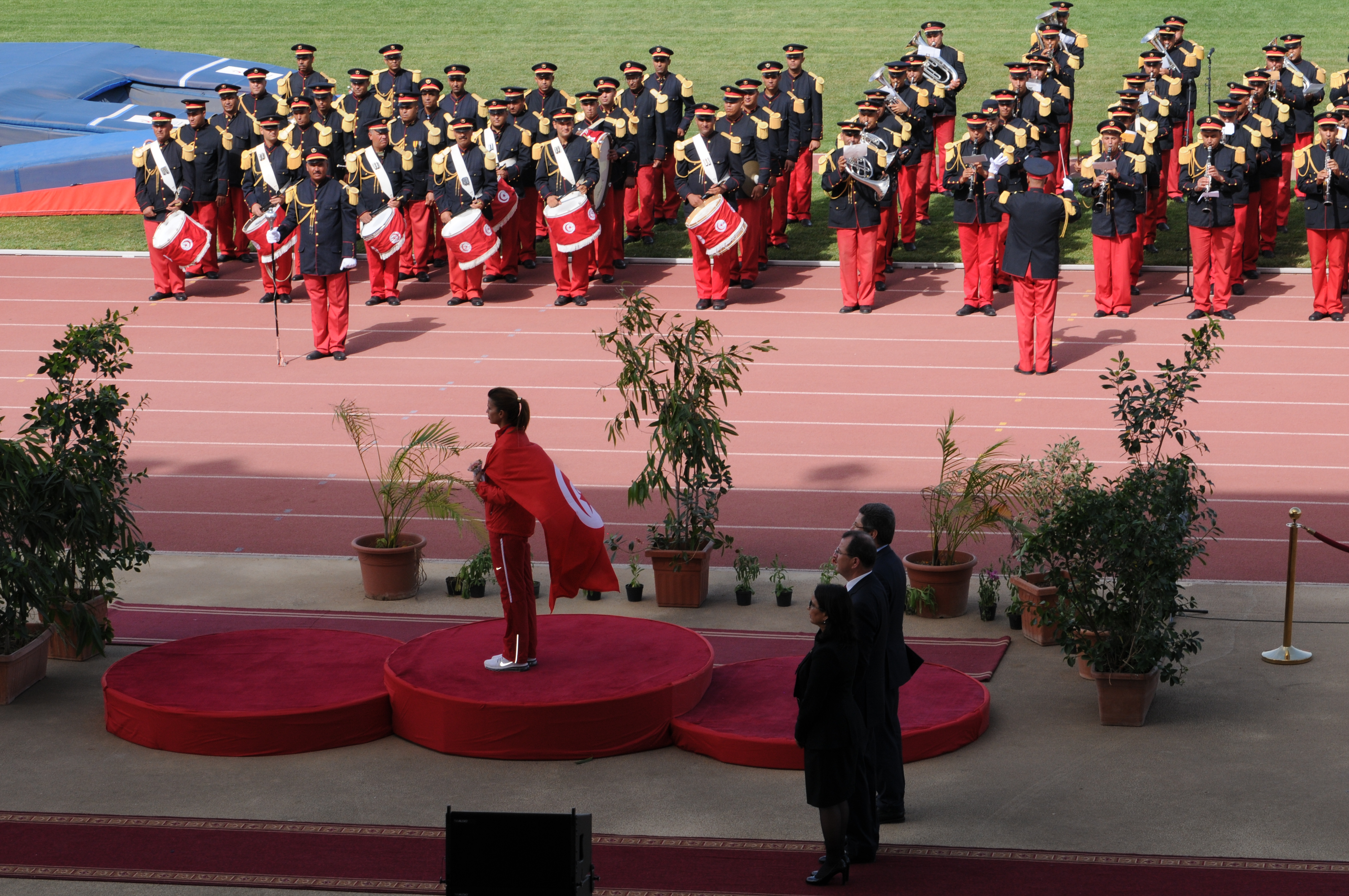
The official unit band.

The regiment of honor has three units: a military band, a ceremonial army detachment and a cavalry squadron. The cavalry unit provides six to thirty-two riders, all of which are bred and trained at the national stud farm of El Battan. It operates in collaboration with the National Foundation for the Improvement of the Horse Race, under the Ministry of Agriculture. The musical parade full dress uniform is either red and white (based on the colors of the Flag of Tunisia) or red and black.

== See also ==
- Presidential Guard Brigade (Nigeria)
- Algerian Republican Guard Band
