= For You (Italian TV channel) =

for you
- Country: Italy

Programming
- Picture format: 576i (16:9 SDTV)

Ownership
- Owner: Mediashopping S.p.A. (Mediaset group)

History
- Launched: 1 March 2011; 14 years ago (as ME)
- Replaced: Mediashopping
- Closed: 20 May 2013; 12 years ago
- Replaced by: Top Crime
- Former names: ME (2011)

Links
- Website: foryou.it

Availability

Terrestrial
- Digital, in Italy: LCN 39

For You (stylised as "for you") was an Italian shopping and movie television channel, available on digital terrestrial television in Italy. Launched on March 1, 2011 as ME, "for you" was the replacement for Mediashopping. The channel adopted its current name on June 6, 2011. The channel has closed broadcasts on May 20, 2013 and has been replaced by the new Mediaset TV channel Top Crime.

It was owned by Mediashopping SpA, a subsidiary of the Mediaset group and broadcast in Italy on DTT channel 39 on mux L'Espresso 1 .

== Shopping TV channel ==
=== Programming ===
Until June 6, 2011 ME transmitted home shopping for 16 hours a day, from 8 a.m. to midnight, using two different brands: the historic Mediashopping and the previous by ME preceded by the name of one of the six divisions: Beauty, Cook, Electro, Home, Sport and Toys.

Until December 31, 2011 for you transmitted home shopping and also programs for 17 hours a day, from 8 a.m. to 1 a.m., as Show 5 Stelle and using just the new brand for you preceded by the name of one of the nine divisions.

The broadcast of TV movies and old TV shows by Mediaset resumed on December 16, 2012 after almost a year of uninterrupted teleshopping programs. From that date on, movies and other non-shopping events were transmitted during 4 breaks in the daytime schedule.

=== Shopping programs ===
- Baby for you
- Beauty for you
- Big Guy for you
- Book for you
- Cook for you
- Electro for you
- Home for you
- Movie for you
- Sport for you
- Tech for you
- Toys for you
- Show 5 Stelle: the best products of the day from all divisions.

==== Hosts ====
All articles are accurately described with demonstrations on using, by experts of the line presented and these hosts:

- Raffaello Benedetti
- Veronica Canizzaro
- Jill Cooper
- Francesca De Rose
- Loredana Di Cicco
- Nino Graziano Luca
- Marco Marino
- Ninfa Raffaglio
- Andrea Spina
- Emanuele Turchi
- Bill Wilsoncia

=== Programs cooking recipes ===
- Cotto e mangiato: either all days from 12 to 12:15 a.m., with reply from 6.45 to 7 p.m.
- In cucina con Mengacci: either all days from 11.30 to 12 a.m.

In Cotto e mangiato Benedetta Parodi and in In cucina con Mengacci Davide Mengacci with Loredana Di Cicco cook using products of line Cook for you.

=== Headings ===
- "Coming Soon": cinema
- "Meteo": weather
- "Oroscopo": horoscope
- "TGCOM": news
- "Tra parentesi": beauty and lifestyle.

== TV movie ==
=== Programming ===
From 1 a.m. to 8 a.m. for you transmits replicas of movies and varied TV series already transmitted by the channel Mediaset.

==== Movies ====
The channel transmits especially movies of:

- adventure,
- comedy
- Italian comedy,
- historical,
- musical

==== TV Series ====
The most famous of TV series transmitted are:

- Grandi domani produced by Maurizio Costanzo and Maria De Filippi, with the presence of emerging actors as Hoara Borselli, Giovanni Esposito, Irene Ferri, Marco Giallini, Francesco Paolantoni, Primo Reggiani, Massimiliano Varrese and the ballerina Oriella Dorella
- Giornalisti with Riccardo Garrone
- I cinque del quinto piano with Gian Fabio Bosco and Luca Sandri.

== See also ==
- Digital television in Italy
- Home shopping
- Mediaset
- Television film
