= Algerian Republican Guard Band =

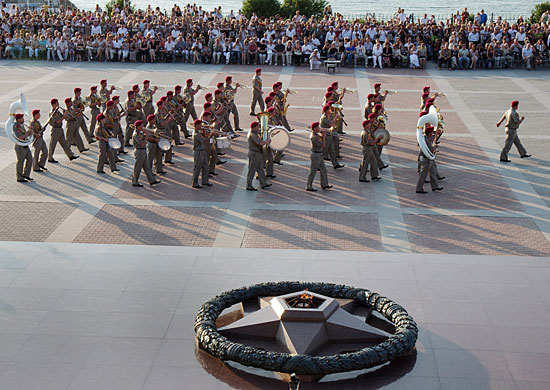
The band performing in southern Ukraine in 2011.

The Algerian Republican Guard Band (Arabic: موسيقى الحرس الجمهوري الجزائري; French: Musique de la garde républicaine d'algérie) is a uniformed marching military band in the Algerian People's National Armed Forces, serving as part of the Algerian Republican Guard.

== History ==
The first band was created during the Algerian War in 1960, on the East and West borders, with the aim of interpreting national songs. The musical group founded on the eastern border, in the Tunisian city of Melag. Following the signing of the Évian Accords, the music group moved to the city of Constantine. In 1963, after being transferred to "L'Ecole des Cadets de la Révolution à Koléa", certain elements continued their studies, while others joined the National Radio Orchestra. After the cease-fire, the military band formed its first services in a large parade of the NLA in Oujda in honor of the members of the Provisional Government of the Algerian Republic. In January 1963, this formation was moved to the Headquarters of the Ministry of National Defense, where it provided music training for the benefit of elements of the Armed Forces The first class, made up of 160 elements, was formed, in record time, in military music. Egyptian President Gamal Abdel Nasser was the first foreign leafer to be honored by the band in May 1963, then the King of Morocco Hassan II in June of the same year. In 1964, the bagpipe band was created and continues, until today, to animate parades in traditional Algerian costumes by presenting the folklore of the popular culture and heritage. In March 1965, the band was transferred to El Harrach Barracks, which was the headquarters of the first military music school. It moved to its current location in January 1969. In September 1973, on the occasion of the holding of the 4th Summit of the Non-Aligned Movement, the band of the Republican Guard performed the national anthems of the member countries during the welcoming and departure ceremonies reserved for participating heads of state at Houari Boumediene Airport.

== Characteristics and duties ==
The band plays the national anthem, "Qassaman", and other national songs on official occasions such as an official state visit by a foreign head of state, or during international events where military musical units gather. The band is divided into the harmonic orchestra and the rhythmic band. The rhythmic band consists of a variety of materials that consist of ensembles such as an oboe band. The musical units also play many instruments including the traditional bagpipe.

=== Participation in international events ===
- Sevastopol Military Tattoo (June 2011)
- 13th International Festival of Military Bands in Veliko Tarnovo (September 2019)
- The Harmonic Ensemble of the Republican Guard and the Central Military Band of the Ministry of Defense of Russia jointly hosted a concert in Algiers as part of the celebrations of the 65th anniversary of the outbreak of the revolution (1 November 2019)

== See also ==
- French Republican Guard Band
- Egyptian Armed Forces Symphonic Band
- Italian Army Music Band
- Ottoman military band
