= 13 dita =

Studio album by Giovanni Allevi
- Released: 1997
- Genre: New-age, Jazz
- Length: 52:23
- Label: Soleluna

Giovanni Allevi chronology
13 dita (1997)	Composizioni (2003)

13 dita is the first solo album by Italian pianist Giovanni Allevi, released in 1997 by Soleluna Records.

== Track listing ==
1. Il nuotatore – 3:15
2. Parole – 3:17
3. Cassetto – 5:46
4. Scherzo n°1 – 4:22
5. Room 108 – 3:10
6. Sogno di Bach – 2:05
7. Improvviso n°1 – 3:24
8. Facoltà di filosofia – 3:57
9. Toccata in 10/16 – 2:35
10. Japan – 3:13
11. Volo sul mondo – 2:47
12. Anelli – 4:32
13. Stella – 3:27
14. Carta e penna – 3:14
15. L'ape e il fiore – 3:19

== Charts ==
Chart (2007–08)	Peak position
Italian Albums (FIMI)	40
