= George Lombardi =

American real estate investor (born 1950s)

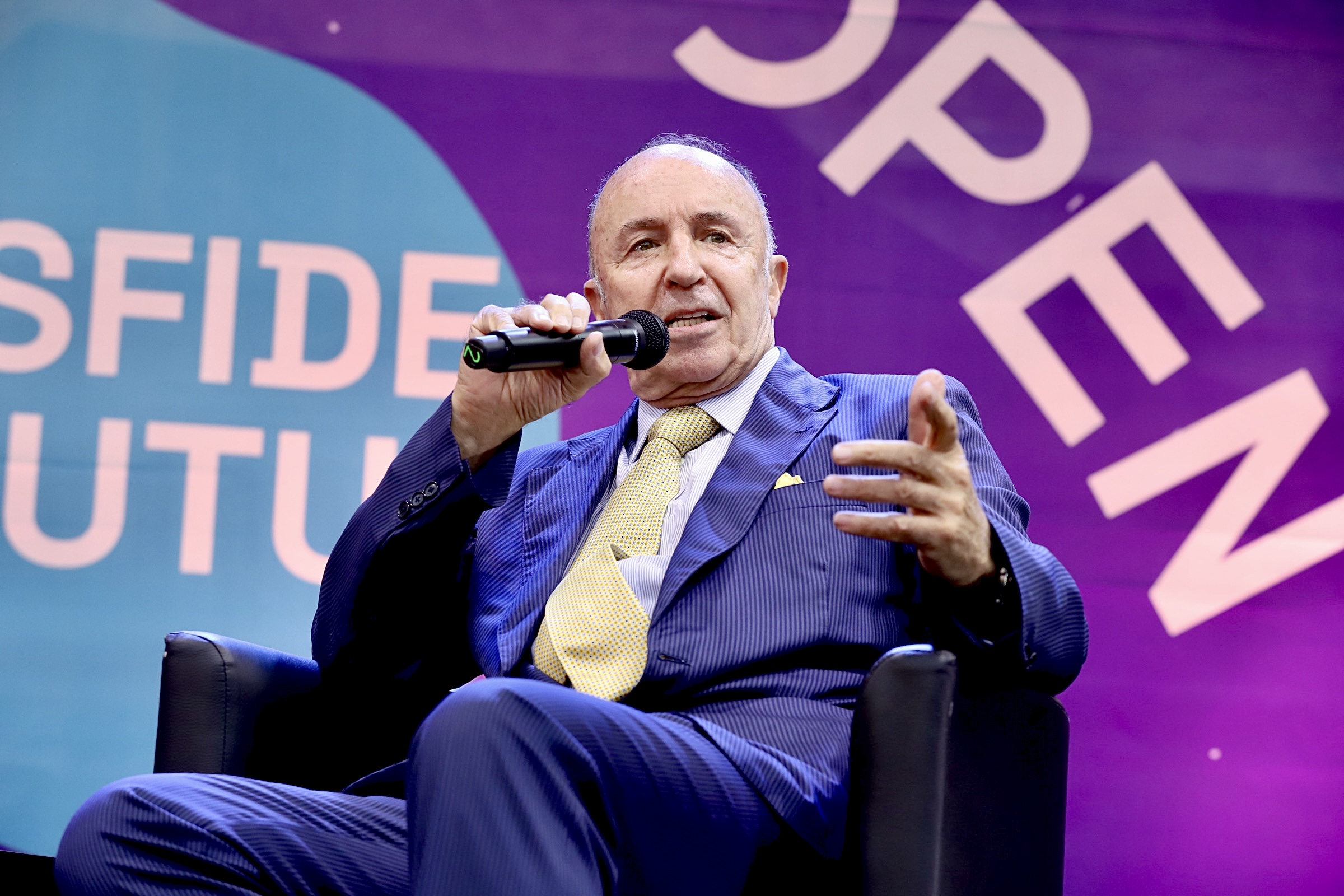
Lombardi at Festival di Open 2024 in Italy

Guido "George" Lombardi (born 1950s) is an American businessman and advisor to Donald Trump. According to Lombardi, he ran a social media operation, such as Facebook groups, supporting Trump's candidacy for U.S. president in 2016 though he was never officially part of the campaign.

Lombardi emigrated to the United States from Italy in the 1970s. He is a former executive director of the International Council for Economic Development and the author of a book "Liberta' e Progresso Economico" (Freedom and Economic Progress). In 2000, he married Gianna Lahainer, widow of real estate magnate Frank Lahainer. She was one of the first buyers of a condo in Trump Tower.

Lombardi received requests to meet with Trump from right-wing leaders in Europe, including French member of European Parliament and head of the National Front Marine Le Pen, Hungarian Prime Minister Viktor Orbán and members of Austria's Freedom Party. Lombardi relayed the messages, but few requests to meet Trump have been granted. Lombardi was famously spotted with Marine Le Pen having coffee at Trump Tower in New York, where Lombardi lives as neighbor of Donald Trump.

He received at the Italian Parliament in Rome the America Award of the Italy-USA Foundation in 2018.
