= Emilio Carelli =

Italian journalist and politician (born 1952)

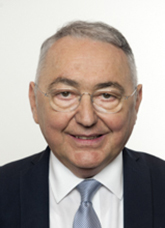

Member of the Chamber of Deputies
- In office 23 March 2018 – 13 October 2022
- Constituency: Fiumicino

Personal details
- Born: 21 May 1952 (age 74) Crema, Lombardy, Italy
- Party: M5S (2018-2021); CI (2021-2022); IpF (since 2022)
- Domestic partner: Silvia Mazzucco
- Children: 2
- Education: Catholic University of Milan
- Profession: Journalist; politician

Emilio Carelli (born 21 May 1952) is an Italian journalist and politician, member of the Chamber of Deputies for the Five Star Movement, since 24 March 2018 until 2 February 2021.

== Early life ==
Emilio Carelli was born in Crema, near Cremona in Lombardy, in 1952, from a middle-class family. After attending the classical lyceum, he graduated in literature in 1975 at the Catholic University of the Sacred Heart in Milan, and later became a professional journalist after completing his studies in the United States. Vice President of the Italy-USA Foundation since 2018.

== Journalistic career ==
In 1980 Carelli was hired by Fininvest, the holding company of Silvio Berlusconi, as editor and journalist of Canale 5. In the same period he was editor of Notizienotte and worked in the editing of Canale 5 News, which replaced Notizienotte. In 1986 he moved to Rome as head of the local Fininvest office. From 1986 to 1992 he hosted with Cesara Buonamici the weekly politics program Parlamento in, broadcast on Canale 5 and Rete 4.

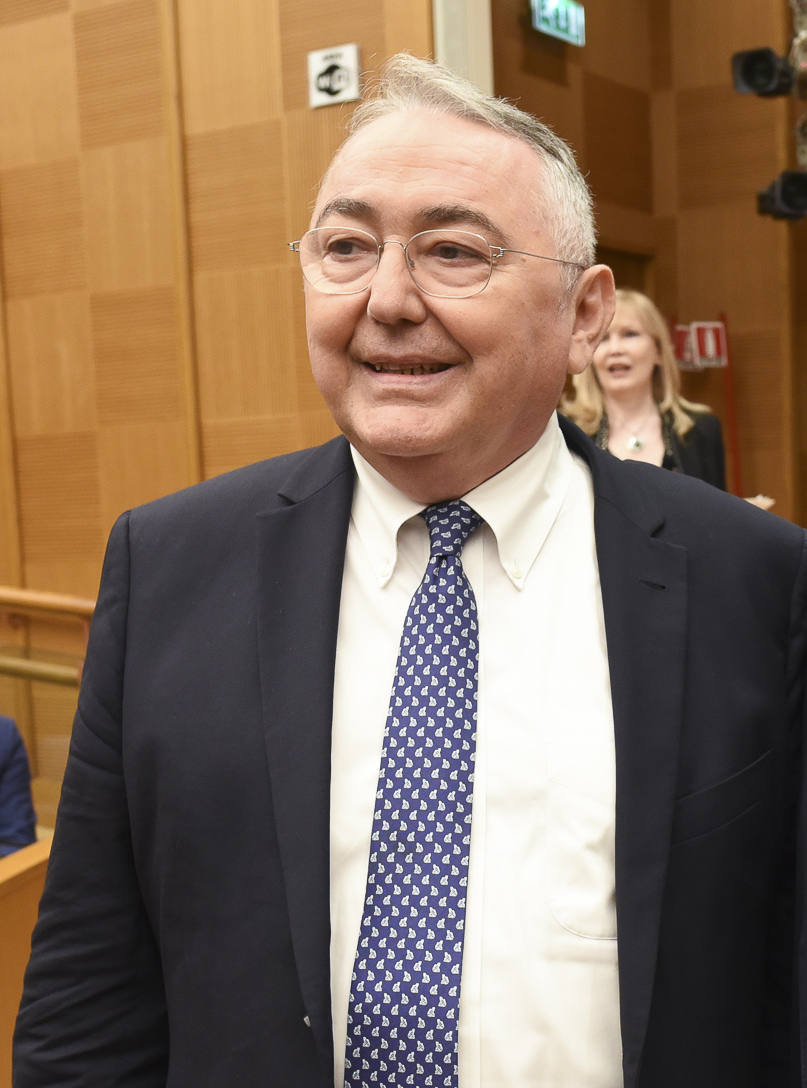
Emilio Carelli in 2018

In 1989, with Tullio Camiglieri, he was the creator and curator of 80s no longer 80s, a program on Italia 1 dedicated to the events and to the most important people of culture and politics during the 1980s. In 1990 he created the program Miti for Italia 1, focusing on the myths and fashions of young people from the 1950s to the 1980s. In January 1989 he became deputy editor of the Videonews magazine. In 1991 Carelli became deputy editor of the journalistic office of Studio Aperto, Italia 1 news programme, and in January 1992 he took part in the foundation of TG5 as deputy director and host. On 1 November 2000 he left TG5 to become deputy director of TGCOM, while the director was Enrico Mentana.

In 2002 he became professor of "Theory and techniques of on-line information" at the faculty of Letters and Philosophy of the Catholic University of Milan. From 16 June 2003 he was replaced by Paolo Liguori to the management of TGcom and became director in charge of the newborn Sky TG 24, the Sky Italia channel dedicated to information and news, in which he also hosted several programmes including America 2008 dedicated to the United States election. Carelli left the editorial board on 4 July 2011, succeeded by Sarah Varetto. Since January 2014 he hosted L'Incontro program, a weekly interview with notable members of Italian politics and society.

== Political career ==
In January 2018, the leader of the Five Star Movement, Luigi Di Maio, announced Carelli's candidacy in the upcoming election in March 2018. Carelli was elected in the Chamber of Deputies in the single-member constituency of Rome–Fiumicino with 39.5% of the votes, beating the center-right Domenico Menorello (32.3%) and the centre-left Tobia Zevi (19.9%).

== Electoral history ==
2018 general election (C): Rome – Fiumicino
Candidate	Party	Votes	%
Emilio Carelli	Five Star Movement	66,721	39.5
Domenico Menorello	Centre-right coalition	54,605	32.3
Tobia Zevi	Centre-left coalition	33,571	19.9
Others		14,051	8.3
Total		168,948	100.0
