= Composizioni =

Studio album by Giovanni Allevi
- Released: 2003
- Genre: New-age, Jazz
- Length: 45:16
- Label: Soleluna

Giovanni Allevi chronology
13 dita (1997)	Composizioni (2003)	No Concept (2005)

Composizioni is the second solo album by pianist Giovanni Allevi. The musician performed Piano Karate at the 59th Festival della canzone italiana.

== Track listing ==
1. L'idea - 2:29
2. Luna - 3:14
3. Le sole notizie che ho - 3:04
4. Incontro - 4:10
5. Apollo 13 - 3:41
6. Monolocale 7.30 a.m. - 3:24
7. Affinità elettive - 5:47
8. Filo di perle - 3:11
9. Il vento - 3:13
10. L'avversario - 1:54
11. La notte prima - 4:28
12. Piano karate - 2:54
13. Sipario - 3:47
