= 2011 in Italy =

- Decades: 1990s; 2000s; 2010s; 2020s; 2030s
- See also: History of Italy; Timeline of Italian history; List of years in Italy

Events of 2011 in Italy:

== Incumbents ==
- President: Giorgio Napolitano
- Prime Minister: Silvio Berlusconi (until 16 November), Mario Monti (starting 16 November)

== Silvio Berlusconi underage prostitution charges ==
- Italian Prime Minister Silvio Berlusconi is being investigated concerning allegations that he paid a 17-year-old girl for sex and that he lied and misused his power to have her released from police custody after she was arrested for theft.
- Berlusconi resigns as Prime Minister.

== Murder of Meredith Kercher ==
- Amanda Knox and Raffaele Sollecito had their murder convictions quashed and were released.

== Births ==
In 2011 there were an estimated 1.44 births (women)

== Deaths ==
- March 12 – Nilla Pizzi, 91, singer
- September 4 – Mino Martinazzoli, 79, politician
- September 13 – Walter Bonatti, 81, mountain climber and journalist
- September 26 – Sergio Bonelli, 78, publisher
- October 21 – Antonio Cassese, 74, jurist
- October 23 – Marco Simoncelli, 24, motorcycle racer
- December 25 – Giorgio Bocca, 91, essayist and journalist
- December 30 – Mirko Tremaglia, 85, politician

== See also ==
- 2011 in Italian television
- List of Italian films of 2011
