= Corrado Maria Daclon =

Italian scientist and journalist

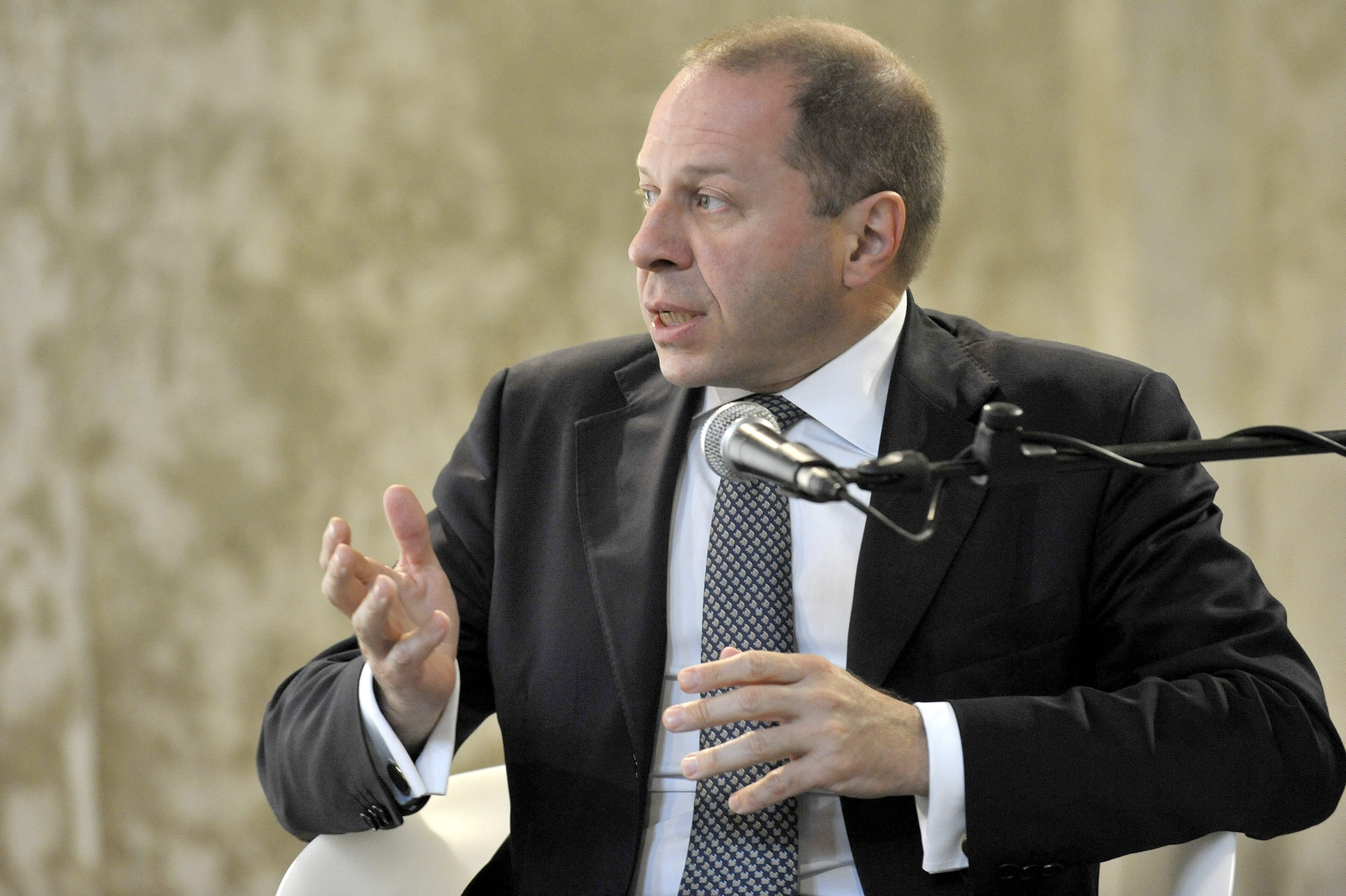
Corrado Maria Daclon

Corrado Maria Daclon (born 1963) is an Italian scientist and journalist.

== Biography ==
He was born in Milan. Since 1995 he has been a professor of environmental policy and geopolitics at the Ca' Foscari University of Venice, Italy, journalist, writer, and a collaborative editorial contributor with periodicals on international energy, environmental and geopolitical issues. Since 1987 to 2012 he has led the oldest Italian environmental organization, Pro Natura.

From 1986 he worked at the highest advisory levels with Government Ministers of the Italian National Government (Prime Minister, Minister of Environment, Minister of Scientific Research, Minister of Agriculture, Minister of Education). Since 1999 Corrado Maria Daclon has been a senior advisor and scientific partner of the NATO Committee on the Challenges of Modern Society, and he has developed relationships with the most senior levels of such international institutions and federal agencies as the European Union (EU), NASA, United Nations (UN) and the Council of Europe, and has published over 60 scientific articles and 16 books, several of which have been adopted as major university text books in Europe and the Mediterranean region. He received the Diploma Meritorium award from European commissioner Stanley Clinton Davis.

In the 1990s he was a member of UNEP Governing Council in Nairobi, to prepare the Earth Summit of Rio de Janeiro, also known as United Nations Conference on Environment and Development. Since 2000 he has been the Italian Focal Point of the Earth Charter project. As of 2005 he has also held the post of Secretary General of the Italy-USA Foundation, the Embassy of the United States in Rome officially attended the establishment of the Foundation, represented by the Minister Counselor for Public Affairs. Dr. Daclon’s government and university service includes work in more than 60 countries in Europe, Africa, Asia, North America and South America.

He is a columnist of the magazine Gnosis published by the Italian Agency of Intelligence Agenzia Informazioni e Sicurezza Interna, and blogger of Huffington Post.

== External links and sources ==
- All American Entertainment - Speakers
- Executive Manager - Biography
- Pro Natura - Staff
- European Commission, Representation in Italy - List of experts
- Catalogue of Italian Libraries and for Bibliographic Information
- Italy-USA Foundation - Staff
- University of Venice - List of Academics
- Earth Charter Focal Point in Italy
- Magazine Gnosis
- blogger Huffington Post
