= Dario Maltese (journalist) =

Italian journalist and television presenter (born 1977)

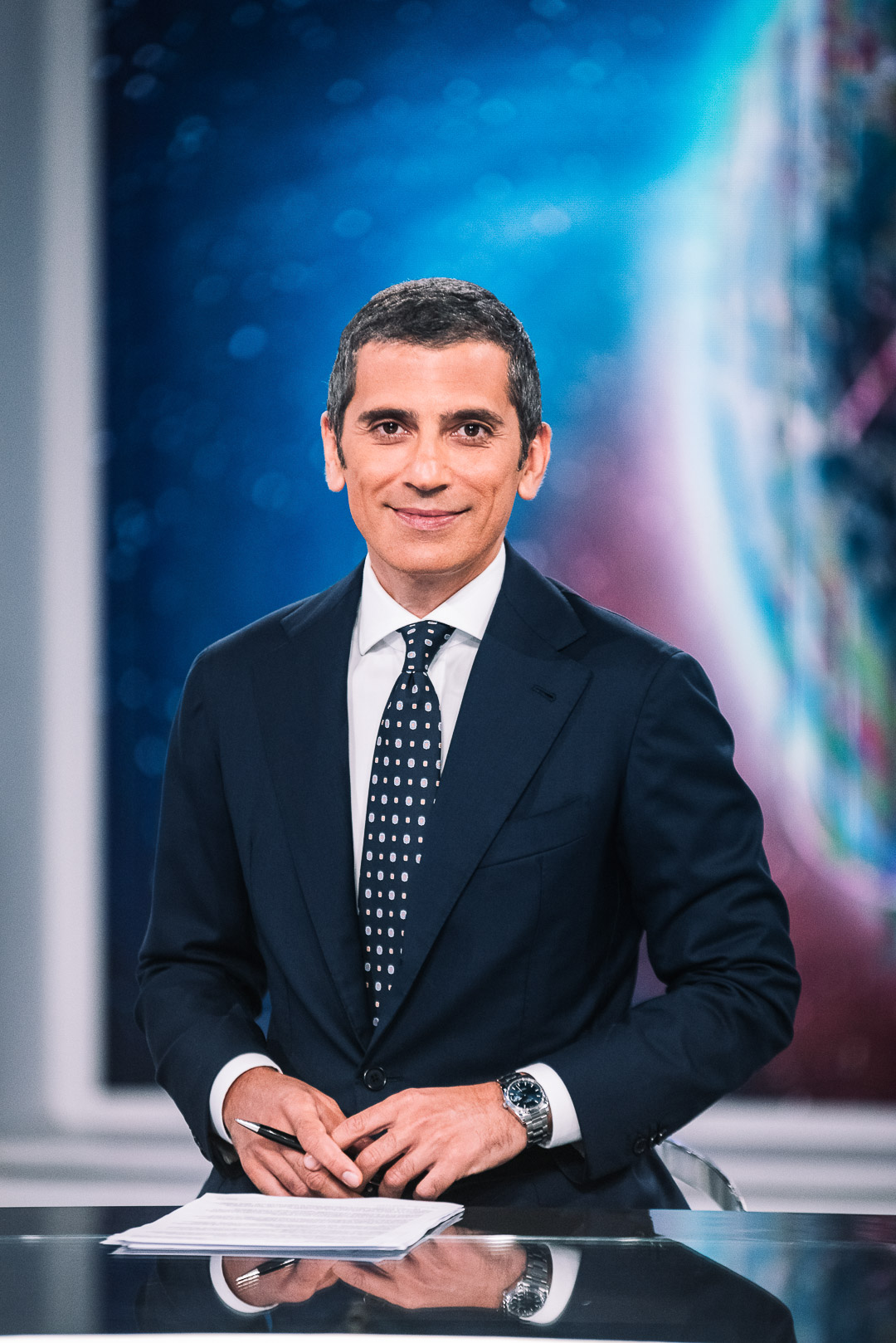
- Dario Maltese at TG5 in 2019
- Born: Dario Maltese; 13 February 1977 (age 49); Erice, Trapani, Sicily, Italy
- Education: Luiss Guido Carli
- Occupations: Journalist and television presenter

Dario Maltese (born 13 February 1977) is an Italian journalist and television presenter.

== Biography ==
After living and studying in Castellammare del Golfo, obtaining a classical high school diploma, he moved from Sicily to Rome, graduating in political science at Luiss Guido Carli.

In 2001 he was hired by Mediaset, where he took part in the editorial staff of Mediasetonline and TGcom and covered the role of correspondent. In 2003 he won the Ischia prize in memory of Angelo Rizzoli reserved for journalists under 35, in the online newspapers category. In 2006 he joined the political editorial staff of TG5 and subsequently the foreign editorial staff.

After an initial period hosting the late-night and 1pm editions, he becomes one of the presenters who alternate hosting the 8pm edition of TG5 and some specials, mainly in-depth foreign policy programmes.

In 2023 he published his first book Les italiens. Storie e incontri con talenti italiani che hanno conquistato la Francia, published by Rizzoli. The following year he took on the role of commentator in the eighteenth edition of L'isola dei famosi hosted by Vladimir Luxuria and hosted the morning program Morning News.

== Television programs ==
Year	Title	Network	Role
2002	TGFin	Rete 4	Host
2017–present	TG5	Canale 5	Host
2017–present	Speciale TG5	Canale 5	Host
2024	L'isola dei famosi	Canale 5	Opinionist
2024–present	Morning News	Canale 5	Host

== Works ==
- Maltese, Dario (2023). Les italiens. Storie e incontri con talenti italiani che hanno conquistato la Francia. Rizzoli. ISBN 9788817183536.

== Awards and nominations ==
Year	Award	Category	Results
2003	Ischia International Journalism Award	Best Journalist Under 35, Online Newspapers	Won
