= Maria Latella =

Italian multimedia journalist (born 1957)

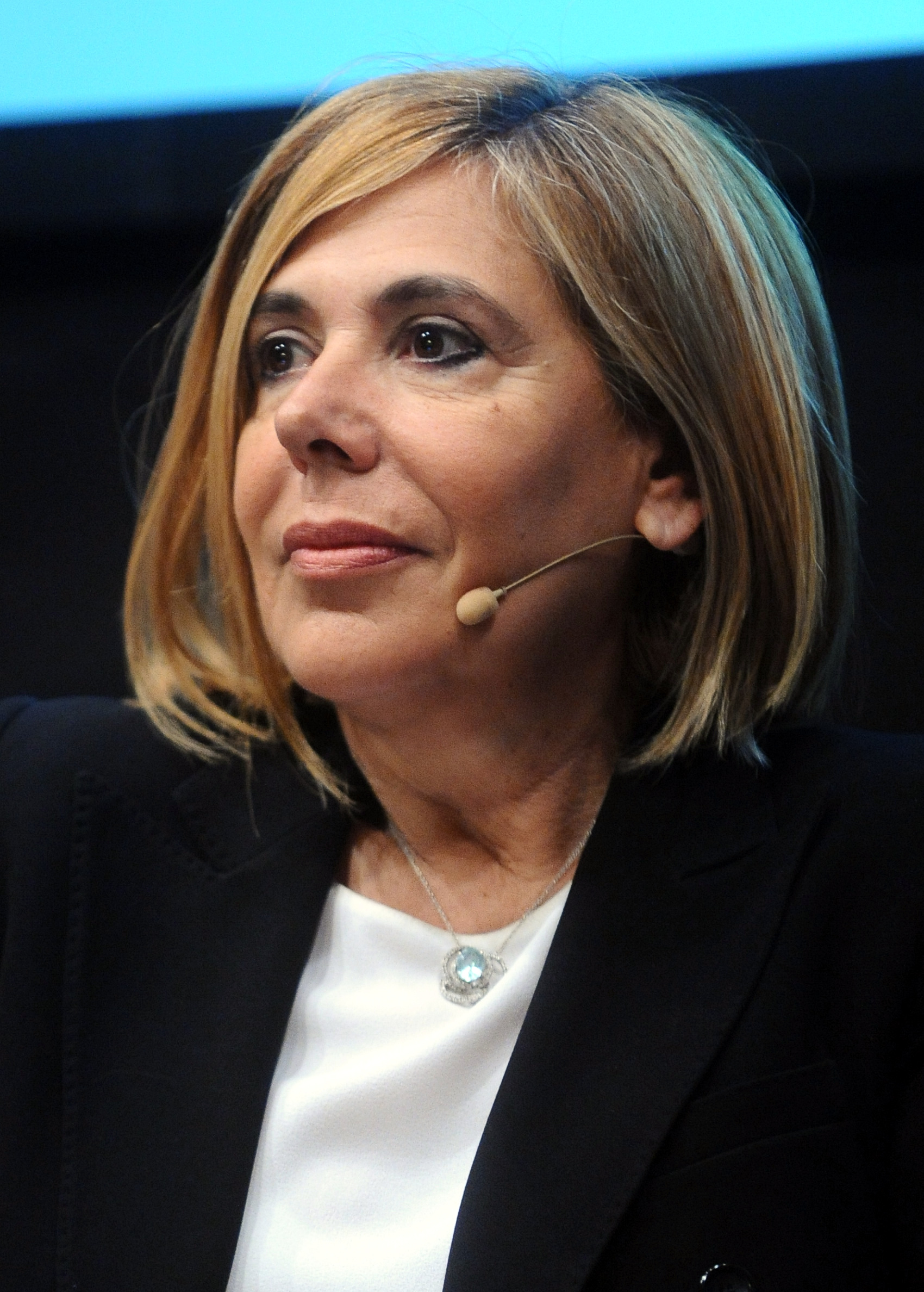
Maria Latella

Maria Latella (born 13 June 1957, in Reggio Calabria) is a multimedia journalist, columnist for Il Messaggero, Rome's leading daily newspaper, TV anchor woman and interviewer. She works for Sky Italia's SkyTg24, on the Sunday morning program "L'Intervista." The show was voted Italy's best political/current affairs TV program of 2012).

She has written several books, including "Tendenza Veronica", the first biography of Veronica Berlusconi. Latella was a political correspondent for the national newspaper "Corriere della Sera" and then editor of the weekly magazine "A". She also worked from Italy for Nbc.

Maria Latella is married, has a daughter and lives between Rome, Milan and Paris.

She received the America Award of the Italy-USA Foundation in 2019.

== Publications ==
- Regimental : dieci anni con i politici che non sono passati di moda. Marsilio. 2003. ISBN 9788831782524.
- Tendenza Veronica. Rizzoli. 2004. ISBN 9788817004077.
- Come si conquista un paese : i sei mesi in cui Berlusconi ha cambiato l'Italia. Rizzoli. 2009. ISBN 9788817031622.
- Il potere delle donne : confessioni e consigli delle ragazze di successo. Feltrinelli. 2015. ISBN 9788807070396.
