= No Concept =

Studio album by Giovanni Allevi
- Released: 16 May 2005
- Genre: New-age, Jazz
- Length: 45:34
- Label: Ricordi

Giovanni Allevi chronology
Composizioni (2003)	No Concept (2005)	Joy (2006)

No Concept is the third album composed by Giovanni Allevi and was published in 2005 by the label Casa Ricordi.

== Track listing ==
1. Go with the flow – 3:35 – 'Emotion must be left to flow: let your existence manifest itself free from obstacles, for nothing belongs to us and all is given.' – Giovanni Allevi
2. Ciprea – 2:57 – 'The neat drawing and the radiant surface of this shell, recall to mind the African rhythms that inspired this extended melody.' – Giovanni Allevi
3. Come sei veramente – 6:07 – 'Whoever is in love has the gift of seeing the other in all their depth, of discovering the intimate beauty even when it is obscured by daily life.' – Giovanni Allevi
4. Prendimi – 2:49 – 'Running after each other until suddenly meeting: and then again, fleeing once more.' – Giovanni Allevi
5. Ti scrivo – 2:45 – 'A letter written with pen and paper in the email era... takes lots of courage. Promise me you will write a real letter.' – Giovanni Allevi
6. Regina dei cristalli – 2:07 – 'The pride of the Renaissance returns upon my fingers: in Music, History is a game where anything can be up to date.' – Giovanni Allevi
7. Ossessione – 2:34 – 'A thousand doors open, the mind seeks thousands of solutions, but there is no way out from the obsession of a face, a memory.' – Giovanni Allevi
8. Sospeso nel tempo – 1:17 – 'A tear on the garment of time is where fresh thoughts lay.' – Giovanni Allevi
9. Le tue mani – 2:30 – 'Of infinite shapes and sensual dances are hands capable, thus revealing intentions and desires that cannot be avowed.' – Giovanni Allevi
10. Qui danza – 2:28 – '"Here’s the rose, here it dances" (Hegel): in order not to lose itself amidst the clouds of conceptuality the absolute must descend unto daily life, revealing all its splendour in the simplicity of a rose. Dance then, celebrating the smallest things as mirrors of the infinite.' – Giovanni Allevi
11. Notte ad Harlem – 5:08 – 'They say that from 125th St. onwards, at night-time one should be afraid, that's why glances veer between fear and curiosity. But the other is a fellow man like me; perhaps it is me that scares him.' – Giovanni Allevi
12. Pensieri nascosti – 2:29 – 'Glances speaking of hidden thoughts.' – Giovanni Allevi
13. Breath – 8:40 – 'I let my body receive the vibrations from the piano's single notes, from the lowest depths up to the head. I listen in total silence, in the dark, with the volume turned up loud. For ten minutes I am outside of this world.' – Giovanni Allevi.

== Notes ==
^ Giovanni Allevi.
