= Sardegna Uno =

Sardinian TV channel

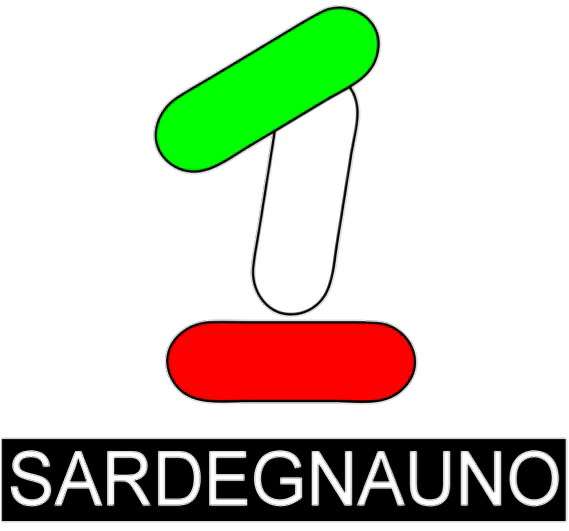
- Country: Italy

Ownership
- Owner: 7 Gold

History
- Launched: 1984

Links
- Website: sardegna1.it

Sardegna Uno is an Italian television owned and operated by 7 Gold. It is located in Cagliari, Sardinia.
