= Carisch =

Carisch is an Italian music publishing house, founded in Leipzig in 1887 under the name Carisch & Jänichen for editorial production, trade and import of sheet music and musical instruments and based in Milan by the Swiss, G.A. Carisch. Initially dealing with the sale of musical instruments and music manuscripts, it became a music publishing concern in 1894. Ownership passed down to various members of the Carisch family and the firm was incorporated in 1936. Carisch has a catalog of printed books of almost five thousand titles, under the labels Carisch and Real Musical, by prestigious and successful authors and composers. Its offices are based in Milan, Paris and Madrid and its products are distributed internationally by Music Sales & Carisch Distribution It became, as well, a recording label, the first in Italy, for example, to issue Beatles recordings in the 1960s. In 1989 Carisch was acquired by Warner Chappell Music Italiana (Group AOL - Time Warner) and then by Monzino, Spa. in 2002.

== See also ==
- List of record labels
