= Italian Army Music Band =

Italian Army Band Banda dell'Esercito Italiano
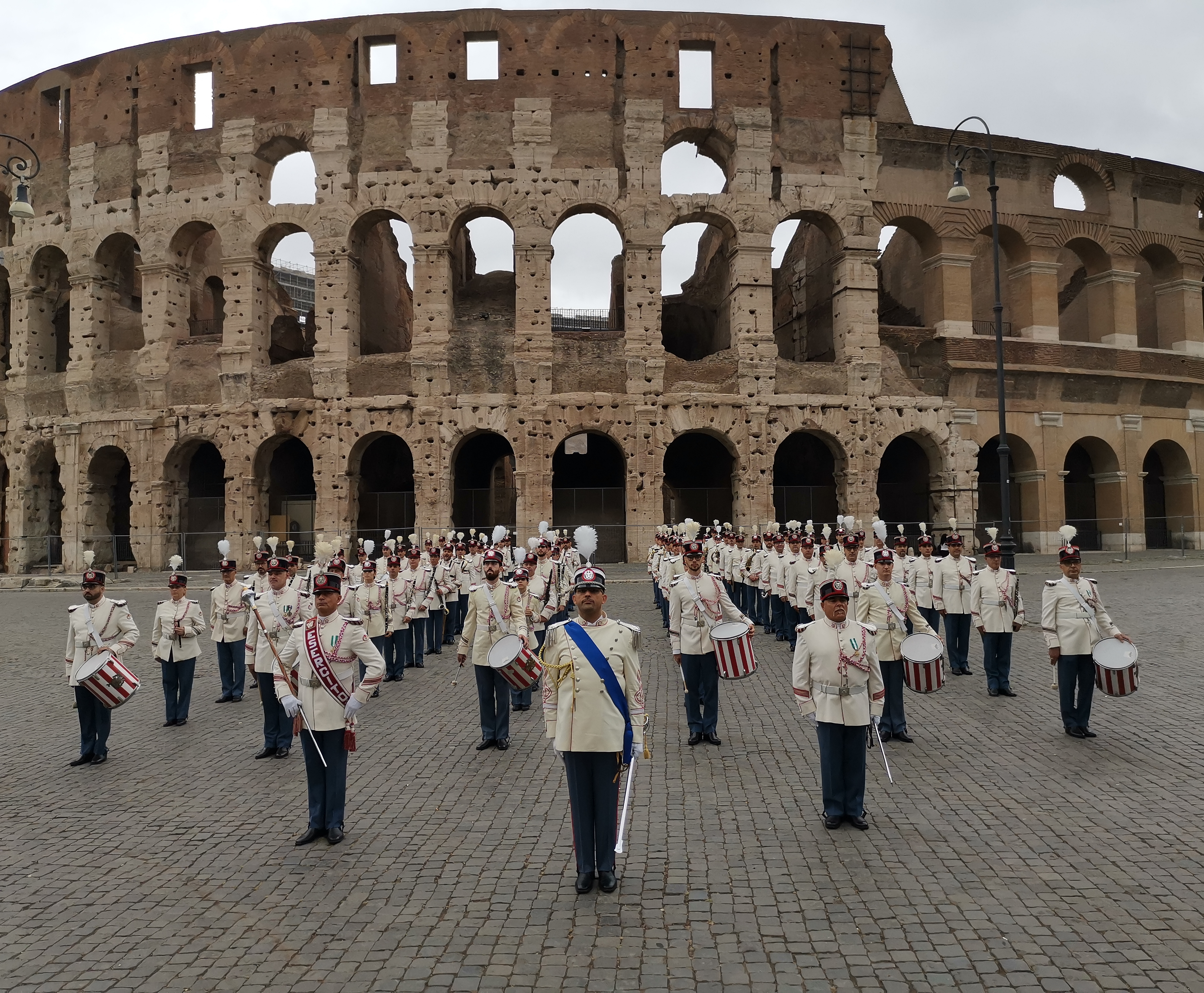
- The Band in front of the Colosseum, 2021

Background information
- Origin: Rome, Italy
- Genres: Original music for band, symphonic transcriptions, pop, jazz, and soundtracks
- Years active: 1964–present
- Members: 1 Maestro Director, 1 Maestro Assistant Director, 102 musicians, 1 archivist
- Website: www.esercito.difesa.it/organizzazione/capo-di-sme/comfoter/la-banda-dell-esercito/

The Italian Army Band (Italian: Banda dell'Esercito Italiano) is the primary musical ensemble representing the Italian Army.

== History ==
The official foundation took place in Rome on February 1, 1964, under the name Banda musicale dell'Esercito Italiano, following a decision by the Italian Army General Staff. The primary purpose was to create 1 single national representative musical institution for official ceremonies and public performances, replacing several other minor military bands that had been disbanded.

Initially, it was placed under the command of the Granatieri di Sardegna division. In December 1964, it assumed an organizational structure that it still maintains today as a largely autonomous unit, although hierarchically subordinate to the Army's National Territorial Command. The first public performance took place on June 2, 1964, in Rome during the military parade for the Festa della Repubblica.

== Symbols ==
=== Logo ===
The logo of the Italian Army Band

The logo, a fundamental element for the identification and recognition of the institutional musical ensemble of the Italian Army, is based on the "alamaro" (frog lacing), which serves as the Band's gorget patch.

The logo is composed as follows:

- The musical lyre: a stringed instrument symbolizing virtue, moderation, and balance.
- The star: represents light, guidance, and distinction. It is superimposed on the musical lyre to achieve continuity in the Armed Force's visual identity.
- The laurel: a symbol of triumph, wisdom, and glory.
- The Tricolour: unequivocally identifies the institution and its national identity.

The graphic design of the logo was curated in 2024 by Andrea Giannetti.

==== Color palette ====
The color palette has been selected to maintain chromatic harmony and historical continuity. For the Tricolour, the official colors released by the Presidency of the Council of Ministers are used.

Official Color Palette
Color	Reference	Pantone	HEX	RGB	CMYK
	Fern Green	17-6153 TCX	#008C45	0, 140, 69	100, 0, 100, 0
	Bright White	11-0601 TCX	#F4F9FF	244, 249, 255	0, 0, 0, 5
	Scarlet Red	18-1662 TCX	#CD212A	205, 33, 42	0, 100, 100, 0
	Gold (Main Logo)	—	#CCA243	204, 162, 67	19, 34, 80, 7
	Gold (Dark/Shadow)	—	#AA883D	170, 136, 61	28, 39, 81, 18
	Grey	—	#B2B2B2	178, 178, 178	0, 0, 0, 40

==== Logotype ====
The resulting style is geometric and strongly echoes the identity of the Italian Army logotype.

== Concert activity ==
Alongside institutional duties — such as oaths, military ceremonies, and guard of honor services at the Quirinal Palace — the Band carries out intense concert activity in Italy and abroad. It has performed in prestigious venues such as Teatro alla Scala, Teatro Verdi, Teatro Bellini, Teatro Petruzzelli, Teatro di San Carlo, Teatro dell'Opera di Roma, La Fenice, and Teatro Regio.

The ensemble has participated in several editions of the Festival dei Due Mondi in Spoleto (1998, 1999, 2001, and 2002). International activities have led the Band to perform in France, Netherlands, Malta, Luxembourg, Belgium, Yugoslavia, Austria, Egypt, and Japan for Expo 2025 Osaka.

== Discography and repertoire ==
The Band has produced a significant discography. The repertoire includes celebratory music and transcriptions from the operatic-symphonic repertoire. Since 2001, it was the first Italian military band to perform Hector Berlioz's Grande symphonie funèbre et triomphale. Recently, the Band recorded a version of Il Canto degli Italiani faithful to Michele Novaro's original manuscript, which was officially adopted by the Quirinal Palace.

== Personnel ==
The military band is composed of 1 Maestro Director, 1 Maestro Assistant Director, 102 musicians, and 1 archivist. All members are permanent service military personnel. Hierarchically, it is subordinate to 1 Commander (a senior officer) and to 1 Maestro Director for artistic aspects. It is based at the Caserma Goffredo Mameli in Rome.

== Maestro directors ==
The following is the complete chronology of the Maestro Directors of the ensemble since its foundation:

- Warrant Officer Pellegrino Caso (acting February 1, 1964 – May 12, 1964)
- Major Amleto Lacerenza (May 13, 1964 – September 3, 1972)
- Warrant Officer Francesco Sgritta (acting September 4, 1972 – October 17, 1975)
- Warrant Officer Manlio Neri (acting October 18, 1975 – March 8, 1976)
- Lieutenant colonel Marino Bartoloni (March 9, 1976 – May 10, 1994)
- Captain Domenico Cavallo (acting May 11, 1994 – August 31, 1997)
- Lieutenant colonel Fulvio Creux (September 1, 1997 – September 22, 2014)
- Captain Antonella Bona (acting September 23, 2014 – July 7, 2019)
- Major Filippo Cangiamila (since July 8, 2019)

== Uniform ==
The Band typically wears the ordinary and service uniforms of the Armed Force, on which it applies a distinctive gorget patch designed for the ensemble. The "alamaro" (frog lacing) consists of a laurel wreath with gold berries, at the center of which is a silver musical lyre; both the star and the patch are placed on a red background. On the headgear, the Band adopts the "pluriarma" badge, depicting a Roman cuirass with helmet, superimposed on crossed rifles, spears, cannons, axes, and electrical discharges, enclosed within oak and laurel branches. For high-profile ceremonies, the Band wears a historical uniform inspired by the Umbertine period, evocative of the reign of King Umberto I of Italy.
