= TGcom =

Italian news website

- the TGcom website from 2007 and 2011
- Website type: Online newspaper
- Available in: Italian
- Founded: March 8, 2001; 25 years ago
- Dissolved: November 28, 2011; 14 years ago
- Successor: Tgcom24 www.tgcom24.mediaset.it
- Headquarters: Italy
- Owner: Mediaset
- Creator: Mediaset
- Founder: Enrico Mentana
- Website: www.tgcom.mediaset.it
- Commercial: Yes
- Launched: March 8, 2001; 25 years ago
- Current status: evolved to Tgcom24, Offline

TGcom was an Italian news Website owned by Mediaset, launched on March 8, 2001. The Website contained mainly Italian and international news coverage, as well as political and entertainment news. TGcom brand was also used to produce news bulletins on Mediaset television channels. TGcom was closed on November 28, 2011, the day in which it was replaced by Tgcom24.

== History ==
It was launched on March 8, 2001, under the direction of Enrico Mentana, who had served as director of TG5 from 1992 to 2004 and, since October 10, 2000, of ‘'Tg.com’', and Deputy Editor-in-Chief Emilio Carelli. The latter would become Editor-in-Chief a year later. From June 16, 2003, to November 28, 2011, the director was Paolo Liguori.

This program was also broadcast on TV during commercial breaks in movies transmitted on Mediaset networks.

TGcom was an online site and did not have a print edition. Furthermore, it was characterized by its ability to deliver news across various media channels: for example, via SMS and MMS services, or through the use of approximately one-minute-long promotional segments during commercial breaks in movies transmitted on the three main Mediaset networks. The news segments themselves aired hourly on the digital channels MediaShopping, Canale 5, Italia 1, Rete 4, and Iris. The latter channel aired Cinema e dintorni, a film news program produced by the Editorial Department, which, following the closure of the website, would later become an independent program.

After joining the NewsMediaset newsroom led by Mario Giordano in 2010, TGcom was taken off the air on November 28, 2011, at 8:30 p.m., coinciding with the launch of the new all-news television network Tgcom24, also directed by Giordano. The website has also been replaced by the new brand.

the TGCOM website from 2001 to 2004

== TGfin ==
Along with TGcom, in 2001, Mediaset also launched TGfin, a sister news program dedicated specifically to the economy that provided quick updates for investors and professionals, based on Radiocor bulletins from Il Sole 24 Ore. For a short time, the news programs were broadcast on Rete 4.
