= Verissimo (TV show) =

- Also known as: Verissimo - Tutti i colori della cronaca
- Presented by: Cristina Parodi (1996–2005); Benedetta Corbi (2005); Giuseppe Brindisi (2005); Paola Perego (2006); Silvia Toffanin (2006–present)
- Country of origin: Italy
- No. of episodes: N/A

Production
- Running time: 60/170/200 minutes

Original release
- Network: Canale 5
- Release: 1996 – present

Verissimo, initially titled Verissimo - Tutti i colori della cronaca, is an Italian entertainment television news program covering events and celebrities which debuted on 1996 on Canale 5. It has been produced in collaboration with TG5 until 2006, when the program switched to Videonews.

From September 1996 until June 2006, it was a daily show, initially hosted by the journalist Cristina Parodi and then replaced by Benedetta Corbi and Giuseppe Brindisi and after by Paola Perego. From September 2006, it became a weekly show hosted by Silvia Toffanin and entirely dedicated to gossip and interviews.
