= Antonio Campo Dall'Orto =

- Born: Antonio Campo Dall'Orto
- Occupation: CEO of RAI

Antonio Campo Dall'Orto is the former CEO of the Italian television broadcasting RAI.

== Career ==
Dall'Orto was CEO of the Italian television broadcasting RAI from December 2015 to June 2017.
