= Silvia Toffanin =

Italian television host, and former fashion model (born 1979)

- Born: 26 October 1979 (age 46); Marostica, Italy
- Occupations: Television host, model, journalist
- Years active: 1997–
- Partner: Pier Silvio Berlusconi (since 2002)
- Children: 2

Silvia Toffanin (born 26 October 1979) is an Italian television host, and former fashion model

== Early life and education ==
Toffanin was born on 26 October 1979 in Marostica. In 2007, Toffanin earned a degree in Foreign Languages and Literature from the Catholic University of Milan.

== Career ==
In 1997, Toffanin was a contestant for Miss Italia but did not win. In 2000, Toffanin debuted in TV as one of the dancers in the Canale 5 quiz Passaparola, with Gerry Scotti (2000). Toffanin stayed in Passaparola until 2002, when she replaced Michelle Hunziker in the late night show Nonsolomoda; she hosted this show until 2009. In 2003, she presented Moda mare a Porto Cervo and then the Saturday afternoon show Mosquito, aired by Italia 1, until 2004. In September 2006, Toffanin replaced Paola Perego in Verissimo, which in that year switched from the daily schedule to the Saturday afternoon. It is still aired by Canale 5. After 2007, Toffanin became a professional journalist.

== Personal life ==
Since 2001 Toffanin's partner is Pier Silvio Berlusconi, who is the father of her son Lorenzo Mattia and her daughter Sofia Valentina.

== Filmography ==
=== Television ===
- Passaparola (Canale 5, 2000–2002)
- Nonsolomoda (Canale 5, 2002–2009)
- Moda mare a Porto Cervo (Italia 1, 2003)
- Mosquito (Italia 1, 2003–2004)
- Verissimo (Canale 5, 2006–present)
