= MediaShopping =

MEDIASHOPPING
- Country: Italy

Programming
- Picture format: 576i (4:3 SDTV)

Ownership
- Owner: MediaShopping S.p.A. (Mediaset group)
- Sister channels: Cincoshop (Spain)

History
- Launched: 30 September 2005; 21 years ago
- Closed: 1 March 2011; 15 years ago
- Replaced by: ME
- Former names: H.O.T. Italia (1998-2000); Home Shopping Europe (2001-2003); Canale D (2003-2005)

Links
- Website: http://www.mediashopping.it/

Availability

Streaming media
- MediaShopping.it: Windows Media

MediaShopping was an Italian shopping TV channel, launched on 30 September 2005, that transmitted 24-hour in Italy on DTT channel 121 on Mux Mediaset 2 and on digital satellite platform SKY Italia channel 808, whose origins go back to 1998 with the channel H.O.T. Italia became first Home Shopping Europe in 2001 and then Canale D in 2003.

Since 1 March 2011 the channel is replaced by ME, and became For you on 6 June 2011.

== Corporate ==
MediaShopping S.p.A. is a company of Mediaset group, owner of the TV channel for you, until 1 March 2011, called by the homonymous name.

=== Brand ===
TV promotions with its own brand, still existing, are transmitted by the channel Mediaset, for shopping with phone and web.

== See also ==
- Digital television in Italy
- Home shopping
- Mediaset
