= Paola Perego =

Italian television host (born 1966)

- Born: 17 April 1966 (age 60); Monza, Italy
- Occupation: Television host
- Years active: 1982–present
- Spouse: Andrea Carnevale (1990–1997)
- Partner: Lucio Presta (2001–present)
- Children: 2

Paola Perego (Italian: [ˈpaːola ˈpɛːreɡo]; born 17 April 1966) is an Italian television host and former model.

== Biography ==
Perego was born in Monza, Italy. She spent her first twenty years in Brugherio, where her grandparents lived. She made her debut in 1982 as a model after visiting a friend in Milan. In 1983 she started working in TV in the local station Antenna 3 Lombardia with comedians Ric e Gian and Teo Teocoli in Ric e Gian graffiti. She was noticed by the Fininvest television network and signed a contract with it in 1984.

She started working on Italia 1 with Marco Columbro in the primetime show Autostop, and during the 1980s worked in several entertainment and sports shows including Record, Superecord, American Ball, Cadillac, Grand Prix, Azzurro and Calciomania.

In 1991 she moved to Telemontecarlo where she presented Settimo squillo with Remo Girone, and the primetime medicine show Quando c'è la salute, with Tiberio Timperi during the 1991/1992 season. The next year she signed a contract with RAI and, from 1992 to 1996, hosted the daily shows Mattina due, In famiglia, Pomeriggio in famiglia and Mattina in famiglia, initially with Alessandro Cecchi Paone and then Massimo Giletti.

She returned to Fininvest, which had become Mediaset, in 1996, and after hosting the short show Aspettando Beautiful replaced Rita Dalla Chiesa in the historical transmission Forum, aired by Retequattro. She presented Forum for six years, until 2003. In 2002 she hosted a primetime show on Retequattro, named I sette vizi capitali.

In 2003 she returned to RAI and remained until 2005. In that year she replaced Alda D'Eusanio in Rai 2's Al posto tuo show, In February 2004 she presented the Italian version of The Mole, named La talpa, replacing Amanda Lear who left after the first episode.

After conducting Castrocaro Music Festival and Sanremo estate with Toto Cutugno, she returned to Mediaset in September 2005 hosting the second season of La talpa on Italia 1. In January 2006 she replaced the journalists Benedetta Corbi and Giuseppe Brindisi in the afternoon infotainment show Verissimo, aired by Canale 5; the decision, taken by Mediaset leaders, was criticized by the transmission's journalist staff.

In September 2006, she stopped hosting Verissimo and replaced Maurizio Costanzo in the Sunday show Buona domenica, giving rise to several criticisms of the quality of the content of the transmission. In June 2008 she also hosted the pilot Il momento della verità, the Italian version of Nada más que la verdad, aired by Italia 1. In the 2008/2009 season Buona domenica was cancelled and she hosted a new Sunday show, Questa domenica. In autumn 2008 she also hosted the third of series La talpa, on Italia 1, and from march to April 2009 Perego presented the fourth edition of the Italian version of The Farm, named La fattoria, on Canale 5.

After a period of absence from the screen, she returned to TV in March 2010 replacing Barbara D'Urso in the primetime show Lo show dei record, aired by Canale 5. In May and June of the same year she hosted the Italia 1 primetime show Wind Music Awards, recorded at the Verona Arena.

She came back to RAI in September 2010 hosting the afternoon show Se... a casa di Paola, aired from Monday to Friday by Rai 1: the programme finished in June 2011. From 13 January to 2 March 2012, she hosted the prime time show Attenti a quei due - la sfida, aired on Friday by Rai 1. From November 2012, she hosted the prime-time show Superbrain, which aired on Saturday on Rai 1.

== Television ==
- Ric e Gian graffiti (Antenna 3 Lombardia, 1983)
- Autostop (Italia 1, 1984)
- Zodiaco (1985)
- Azzurro (Italia 1, 1986)
- Tuttinfamiglia (Canale 5, 1988)
- Calciomania (Italia 1, 1990)
- Settimo squillo (Telemontecarlo, 1991)
- Quando c'è salute (Telemontecarlo, 1991–92)
- Mattina due/In famiglia (Rai 2, 1992–96)
- Zecchino d'Oro (Rai 1, 1996)
- Aspettando beautiful (Canale 5, 1996)
- Forum (Rete 4, 1997–2003)
- Forum di sera (Rete 4, 1997)
- Canzoni sotto l'albero (Canale 5, 1997)
- Salto nel buio (Rete 4, 2001, 2004)
- I sette vizi (Rete 4, 2002)
- Festival di Castrocaro (Rai 1, 2003–04)
- Al posto tuo (Rai 2, 2003–05)
- Sanremo estate (Rai 1, 2004)
- La talpa (Rai 2, Italia1, 2004–2005, 2008)
- Verissimo (Canale 5, 2006)
- Buona Domenica (Canale 5, 2006–08)
- Il momento della verità (Italia 1, 2008)
- Questa domenica (Canale 5, 2008–09)
- Questo capodanno (Canale 5, 2008)
- La fattoria (Canale 5, 2009)
- Lo show dei record (Canale 5, 2010)
- Wind Music Awards (Italia 1, 2010)
- Se... a casa di Paola (Rai 1, 2010–11)
- Attenti a quei due - la sfida (Rai 1, 2012)
- Superbrain (Rai 1, 2012)
- Domenica in (Rai 1, since 2014)

== Filmography ==
Year	Title	Role	Notes
2010	Distretto di polozia 10	celebrity	1 episode
2012	My families	Perla	TV movie
2013	Il tredicesimo apostolo	Clara Antinori	Season 2
