= TG5 =

Italian television news show

- Logo since 2018
- Created by: Enrico Mentana, Lamberto Sposini, Clemente J. Mimum, Emilio Carelli, Cesara Buonamici and Cristina Parodi
- Starring: See Presenters
- Ending theme: TG5 jingle
- Country of origin: Italy
- Original language: Italian

Production
- Running time: See Daily programme

Original release
- Network: Canale 5 TGcom24 (simulcast)
- Release: January 13, 1992 – present

TG5 (TeleGiornale 5) is a news programme on the Italian television channel Canale 5, part of the Mediaset network and owned by MFE - MediaForEurope. It is broadcast domestically on Canale 5 and Mediaset TGcom24 several times a day. The ratings for the programme's 08:00 PM edition are among the highest for Italian commercial television. The programme is broadcast from Rome. The editor-in-chief is Clemente Mimun.

== Programme format ==
The roots of the programme go back to 1980 on Canale 5, with a programme covering Lombardy called Video 5. In 1983, it was replaced by Canale 5 News.

The programme is generally presented by a single newsreader, but with additional newsreaders for financial reports. Generally, the programme features reports which are preceded and followed by the correspondent reporting live from the scene of the report.

TG5, as it exists today, was created in 1992 with Enrico Mentana as director.

== Programmes ==
Name	CET Time	Description	Running time
TG5 Prima Pagina	06:00	7-minute news bulletin with traffic, weather and financial reports.	Repeats every 15 minutes (last run at 07:45 AM).
TG5 Mattina	08:00		35-40 mins.
TG5 Breve LIS	10:50	From Monday to Friday. The presenters are supported by an Italian sign language interpreter.	3 mins.
TG5 Giorno	13:00		35 mins.
TG5	20:00	Preceded by the cover TG5 Prima Pagina aired at 19:54	30 mins.
TG5 Notte	After prime time	Presents several newspapers front-pages through a touch-screen machine	35 mins.

- TG5 Mattina and TG5 flash: Cristina Bianchino, Paolo Di Lorenzo, Francesca Cantini, Veronica Gervaso, Roberta Floris
- TG5 Giorno and TG5 flash: Simona Branchetti, Costanza Calabrese, Domitilla Savignoni, Paola Rivetta, Francesca Cenci
- TG5 Sera: Cesara Buonamici, Alberto Bilà, Elena Guarnieri, Dario Maltese
- TG5 Notte: Lorenzo Montersoli, Antonio Sapio, Paolo Trombin

== Editor-in-chief ==
- 1992-2004 - Enrico Mentana
- 2004-2007 - Carlo Rossella
- 2007-present - Clemente Mimun
- 2020 - Mauro Crippa (ad interim)
