= 1999 in Italian television =

This is a list of Italian television related events from 1999.

== Events ==
=== Rai ===
- 23 February: Anna Oxa wins the Sanremo festival with Senza pietà. The show is conducted, for the first time, by Fabio Fazio, sided by the actress Letitia Casta and by the Nobel Prize for Medicine Renato Dulbecco; the presenter achieves a personal success, getting the presence of several international guest stars, even not related to the music, such as Michael Gorbachev and Neil Armstrong. The festival is the most watched program of the year, with 16,234,000 spectators.
- 26 April: at 6 am, the all-news satellite channel Rai news 24 begins to broadcast.
- 6 May: The snack thief, first episode of the Montalbano series, is aired on RAI 2.
- 1 July: the thematic channels RAISat Cinema, Album (material from the RAI archive), Art, Show, Ragazzi (for children) and Gambero Rosso (cooking) make their debut (for a fee) on the satellite platform Tele+ Digitale.
- 27 July: Rai Way is born. The company owns and manages the RAI broadcasting infrastructure. In the year, RAI effectuates, in Rome, the first digital terrestrial broadcastings.
- 7 October: the first episode of ’Francamente me ne infischio, with Adriano Celentano, is broadcast. Provocative as usual, the singer alternates musical numbers with a shocking video against the capital punishment, displaying an execution in Guatemala. The show gets 9,6 million viewers.

=== Mediaset ===
- 3 July - Debut of Momenti di gloria, a series hosted by Mike Bongiorno in which members of the public impersonate their favourite singers.

=== Other channels ===
- Law 78, regulating Italian pay-TV, is promulgated; it imposes some antitrust rules to contrast Rupert Murdoch's plans for a monopoly in the sector.
- 30 May: the local televisions network Italia 7 splits into two ones: 7 Gold and Europa 7, belonging to the Abruzzo businessman Francesco Di Stefano.
- 28 July: A decree of the Ministry of Communications establishes that the national frequencies of Rete 4 are transferred to Europa 7. The rule, which should reduce Mediaset's monopoly of private television, will never be applied, despite a long Di Stefano's legal battle.

== Awards ==
16. Telegatto award, for the season 1998–1999.

- Show of the year: Striscia la notizia.
- Man and woman of the year: Teo Teocoli and Paola Barale.
- Best TV movie: Ultimo
- Best serial: Un medico in famiglia (for Italy) and Derrick (for abroad)-
- Best quiz: In bocca al lupo.
- Best variety: Carramba, che fortuna.
- Best satirical show: Le iene.
- Best talk show: Maurizio Costanzo show.
- Best music show: C’era un ragazzo
- Best magazine: Porta a Porta.
- Best sport magazine: Quelli che... il calcio
- Best show for children: GT ragazzi.
- Special awards: Chi l’ha visto (for the service TV), Murder, she wrote (cult show), Mrs. Attilia Pellgrini (reader of Sorrisi e Canzoni), Enzo Biagi (for the TV journalism), Ciao Darwin, Sandra Mondaini and Raimondo Vianello (for Casa Vianello’s ten years).

== Debuts ==
=== Miniseries ===
- Commesse (Salesgirls) – by Giorgio Capitani and Josè Maria Sanchez, with Nancy Brilli, Sabrina Ferilli, Veronica Pivetti and Anna Valle; 2 seasons. Comedy drama about family and work troubles of some salesgirls in a Roman boutique.

=== Serials ===
- Inspector Montalbano by Alberto Sironi, with Luca Zingaretti in the title role, Cesare Bocci, Angelo Russo and Katharina Bohm, from the Andrea Camilleri's novels; 15 seasons. Procedural set in the imaginary Sicilian town Vigata, it's the greatest public and critic success of the latest Italian fiction and one of the few Italian serials exported abroad.
- Non lasciamoci più (Let's never break-up again) – romantic comedy by Vittorio Sindoni, with Fabrizio Frizzi (in his only performance as an actor) and Debora Caprioglio; 2 seasons. A marriage lawyer, confirmed bachelor, avoids several useless divorces, till he's embedded by his helper, a charming female private eye.
- Turbo – with Roberto Farnesi, Anna Valle and the Border Collie Sun Shonik as protagonist in the role of a police dog; 2 seasons.

=== Variety ===
- Al posto tuo (In your place)– talk-show hosted by Alba d’Eusabio; 7 seasons. Considered a typical example of trash TV, the program is also accused of presenting as real made-up stories; following the controversies, the presenter was replaced by Paola Perego.
- Cominciamo bene (We start well) – talk show of the morning, hosted by Toni Garrani, Michele Mirabella and various others; 13 seasons (+ 10 seasons of the summer edition and various spin-off).
- Convenscion – cabaret with Enrico Bertolino and Natasha Stefanenko; 3 seasons.
- Festa di classe (Class party) – game show hosted by Amadeus and Pippo Franco; 2 seasons. Two VIP (a man and a woman) must compete with their old schoolmates.
- Sette per uno (7 x 1) – game show of the summer from the Mirabilandia park, hosted by Gigi Sabani; 3 seasons
- Sanremo estate (Sanremo in the summer) – musical show, 6 editions.
- Varietà – anthology of variety from the RAI archive; 5 seasons. It generates two spin-offs (Supervarietà and Fantastico! 50 anni insieme)

=== News and educational ===
- Correva l’anno (It was the year...) – historical magazine, care of Paolo Mieli.
- La musica di RAI 3 – magazine of art music; 16 seasons.
- C’era una volta (Once upon a time) by Silvestro Montanaro – magazine about the problems of the Third World, realized in collaboration with United Nations; 14 seasons.

=== For children ===
- Melevisione (Apple TV) – show for children, hosted by Danilo Bertazzi and Lorenzo Branchetti; 16 seasons. Initially, it's a simple block programming of cartoons, but soon it evolves in two distinct shows: La Melevisione (a sti-com set in an enchanted wood) and La melevisione e le sue storie (cartoons).
- (United Kingdom) Teletubbies (RaiSat Ragazzi) (1997-2001, 2015–present)
- (United States) The Angry Beavers (Rai 2) (1997–2001)

=== Serials ===
- Finalmente soli (Alone, at least) – sit-com with Gerry Scotti and Maria Amelia Monti, spin-off of Io e la mamma; 5 seasons and 3 TV-movies. A dentist, who has lived with his mother up to forty, faces for the first time marriage and fatherhood.

=== Variety ===
- Allegria! – quiz aired for Christmas and hosted by Mike Bongiorno, with VIP contenders answering questions about television history; 3 editions.
- 3 July - Momenti di gloria (1999–2000)
- Passaparola – game show hosted by Gerry Scotti, Italian version of The alphabet game; 8 seasons.
- Chi ha incastrato Peter Pan? (Who framed Peter Pan?) – game show and variety with contenders from four to ten years old, hosted by Paolo Bonolis and Luca Laurenti; 6 seasons. (The 2005 edition, hosted by Gerry Scotti, has been called Who framed Uncle Gerry?) Italian version of the Spanish Esos locos bajitos.
- Il trucco c’è (There is the make-up) - talk show hosted by Rita dalla Chiesa and the make-up artist Diego dalla Palma; 2 seasons.

=== Serials ===
- Vivere – soap opera about the lives of three families in Como, with Gianni Garko and Veronica Logan; 8 seasons.
- Finché c’è ditta c’è speranza (As long there is the company there is hope) – comical sketches with the comic quartet La premitata ditta (including Pino Insegno)

=== News and educational ===
- Pressing champions’ league – sport magazine about the matches of UEFA champions League, hosted by Massimo De Luca and Giorgia Rossi; 9 seasons (with a break from 2006 to 2019)
- TV Moda – fashion magazine, hosted by Jo Squillo; again, on air. Born on the Mediaset channels, it evolves later into a satellite channel of its own., owned by Class Editori.

=== For children ===
- September - (United States) / (Canada) Pocket Dragon Adventures (Italia 1) (1998–1999)

=== Other channels ===
- Anime night; 11 seasons. Unlike in other Italian televisions, anime are broadcast uncensored for an adult audience. (MTV Italia)
- Total request Italia – Italian version of Total Request Live; 11 seasons (MTV Italia)
- Come Thelma e Louise (As Thelma and Louise) – reality series, hosted by Justine Mattera, showing couples of girls travelling in exotic places; 3 seasons. (TMC 2 and later Odeon TV)
- Stargate Linea di confine (Stargate borderline) – program of popular science (actually, of pseudoscience and pseudo-history), initially bound to the Stargate serial, hosted by Ruggeerio Giacobbo and, later, by Valerio Massimo Manfredi; 9 seasons (TMC).
- Diretta stadio: ed è subito gol! (later, Diretta studio), talk show commenting live the main football matches, and TG7 sport, sport news programs; both again on air (Italia 7 Gold)
- Missione relitti (Relic mission) – magazine about underwater explorations; (Odeon TV)

== Television shows ==
=== Drama ===
- Pinocchio ovvero lo spettacolo della Provvidenza (Pinocchio, or The Providence's show) – parody of the Collodi's novel, directed and interpreted by Carmelo Bene.
- A due passi dal cielo (Two steps from the sky) by Sergio Martino, with Giulia Boschi and Pino Quartullo; drama about adoption.
- Il compagno (The comrade) – by Francesco Maselli, with Luca Zagaria and Amanda Sandrelli, from Cesare Pavese's novel; the ripening of a young communist under the fascism.
- Meglio tardi che mai (Better late than never) – by Luca Manfredi, with Nino Manfredi and Nancy Brilli (father and wife of the director); a girl pursues to Cuba her father, fled from an oppressive family, but ends up following his example.
- Tutti per uno (All for one) – by Gianfranco De Sisti, with Giampiero Ingrassia and Anna Valle; a group of children resort to all means, even illicit, to pay for a heart operation on one of their mates.
- I guardiani del Cielo (The sky wardens) – by Alberto Negrin, archeological fantasy from Valerio Massimo Manfredi's Tower of loneliness, with Ben Cross and Peter Weller.

==== Religious ====
- Esther – by Raffaele Mertes, with Louise Lombard in the title role and F. Murray Abraham as Mordecai; tenth episode of the Lux Vide's Bible project.
- Jesus – by Roger Young, with Jeremy Sisto in the title role, Jacqueline Bisset as Mary, Debra Messing as Mary Magdalene and Gary Oldman as Pontius Pilate; 2 episodes. Eleventh episode of the Lux Vide's Bible project.
- Una farfalla nel cuore (A butterfly in the heart) – by Giuliana Gamba, with Claudia Pandolfi; an upper-class girl discovers her religious calling after the death of a friend.

==== Crime ====
- Ama il tuo nemico (Love your enemy) by Damiano Damaini, with Andrea Di Stefano and Massimo Ranieri; 2 episodes. A young criminal is redeemed by the example of an anti-Camorra priest
- Il mistero del cortile (The courtyard mystery) – by Paolo Poeti, with Elisabetta Gardini and Franco Castellano; 2 episodes. A psychologist, casual witness of a murder, is, against her will, involved in the enquiry.
- La donna del treno (The train woman) by Carlo Lizzani, with Antonella Fattori and Alessio Boni; 2 episodes. A deputy prosecutor investigates a crime, whose main suspect was her one-night stand.
- Morte di una ragazza perbene (Death of a good-natured girl) – by Luigi Perelli, with Remo Girone, Romina Mondello and Riccardo Cucciolla in his last role; vaguely inspired by the killing of Marta Russo.
- Ombre (Shadows) – thriller by Cinzia Th Torrini, with Stefania Rocca and Tobias Moretti; coproduced with Germany. The hunt for a serial killer is bound to mysterious murders happened three centuries earlier.

=== Miniseries ===
- Gli amici di Sara (The friends of Sara) by Gabriele Muccino; 8 shorts produced by Ministry of Health for a campaign against AIDS and broadcast simultaneously by RAI and Mediaset.
- Fine secolo (End of the century) – by Gianni Lepre, with Fabrizio Contri, Ana Kanakis and Arnoldo Foà; 6 episodes; intricate detective story vaguely inspired by the events of the Ferruzzi family.
- La vita che verrà (The coming life) – by Pasquale Pozzerese, with Valeria Golino, Roberto De Francesco and Margherita Buy; 4 episodes; family saga, showing the Italian history from 1944 to 1960, through the lives of two married couples.

=== Serial ===
- Baldini e Simoni – sitcom about an enlarged family, with Roberto Citran and Mariella Valentini.
- Pepe Carvalho – Italian-Spanish co-production from Manuel Vázquez Montalbán's novels, with Juanjo Puigcorbé and Valeria Marini.

=== For children ===
- Jolanda, la figlia del corsaro nero (Yolanda, the black corsair's daughter) – animated series from the Emilio Salgari's novel, coproduced with Spain.

=== Variety ===
- C’era un ragazzo... (There was a boy) – tribute show to Gianni Morandi, debuting as presenter.
- I fantastici di Raffaella – daily strip with Raffaella Carrà
- Francamente me ne infischio (Frankly, my dear, I don't give a damn) – musical show with Adriano Celentano and Francesca Neri (see over).
- GNU (sigle fo Genial, New, Unique) – showcase show for young comic actors, hosted by Pia Klover.
- 2000 today – show of the end of the year.
- Su e giù (Up and down) – infotainment show, hosted by Gaia De Laurentis.
- Troppolitani – cabaret with Antonio Rezza, the comic actor has surreal conversations with passers-by on the streets of Rome.
- L’ultimo valzer (Last waltz) – spinoff of Anima mia, with Fabio Fazio and Claudio Baglioni.
- Barracuda – late show with Daniele Luttazzi.

=== News and educational ===
- Circus – itinerant talk show, set under a circus tent, hosted by Michele Santoro.
- Ragazzi del 99 (The ‘99 boys) - magazine by Enrico Deaglio.

=== Drama ===
- Cristallo di rocca, una storia di Natale (Rock crystal, a Christmas history) - by Maurrizio Zaccaro, from Adalbert Stifter's novel, with Virna Lisi and Tobias Moretti; coproduction with Austria.
- Villa Ada – by Pier Francesco Pingitore, with Gianni Garko and Eva Grimaldi; several stories interlace on the background of the Roman park.
- Mio figlio ha settant’anni (My son is 70 years old) – by Giorgio Capitani, with Massimo Dapporto, Philippe Noiret and Elena Sofia Ricci; a married couple must face an uneasy coexistence with an evicted old neighbor.
- Tre stelle (Three stars) – by Pier Francesco Pingitore, with Alba Parietti, Eva Grimaldi and Mandala Tayde; the misadventures of three Italian actresses in the Second world war.

==== Crime ====
- IAS – Investigatore allo sbaraglio (Detective in Jeopardy) - by Giorgio Molteni, with Corrado Mantoni as himself; pilot of a detective comedy series, not realized for the death of the showman.
- Il commissario Raimondi (inspector Raimondi) - by Paolo Costella; with Marco Columbro and Barbara De Rossi.
- Mai con i quadri (Newer with the Paintings) and Tre addii (Three farewells) – by Mario Caiano, with Daniele Liotti and Anne Roussel; a judge and a policewoman (former lovers) investigate together about mysterious murders.
- Ultimo – La sfida by Michele Soavi, with Raul Bova and Ricky Memphis; sequel of Ultimo

=== Serial ===
- Anni 60 (The Sixties) - by Carlo Vanzina, with Ezio Greggio, Jerry Calà and Maurizio Mattioli; tribute to the classics of the commedia all’italiana.
- Caraibi – pirate swashbuckler by Lamberto Bava, with Nicholas Rogers and Mario Adorf.
- Michele Strogoff, il corriere dello zar – by Fabrizio Costa, with Paolo Seganti and Hardy Kruger jr, from the Jules Verne's novel;
- Ciao Professore (Hello teacher) - miniseries about school by José Maria Sanchez, with Massimo Dapporto and Antonella Fattori.
- L’ispettore Giusti (Inspector Giusti) detective comedy by Sergio Martino, with Enrico Montesano and Mietta.
- Squadra mobile scomparsi (Missing persons flying squad) – procedural by Claudio Bonivento, with Claudio Amendola and Elena Sofia Ricci

=== Variety ===
- La canzone del secolo (The song of the century) - music show hosted by Pippo Baudo.
- Capriccio – erotic talk show, hosted by Alba Parietti
- Innamorati pazzi (Madly in love) - St. Valentine's Day show, hosted by Loretta Goggi.
- Tel chi el telun (Here is the marquee in Milan dialect) - shooting of Aldo, Giovanni and Giacomo stage show.

=== News and educational ===
- Real TV, eroi per caso (Casual heroes) - docu-drama about the dramatic experiences of true persons, hosted by Marco Liorni; the show is deleted after a season, because of a lawsuit for plagiarism by RAI.

=== Other channels ===
- Dario Argento, il mio cinema (Tele+) - documentary by Luigi Cozzi.

== Ending this year ==
- Campioni di ballo
- Chi c’è c’è
- Colpo di fulmine
- Due per tre
- Game boat
- Giochi senza frontiere
- Glu Glu
- Lui e lei
- Moby Dick
- Il mondo di Quark
- Quark speciale
- Sgarbi quotidiani

== Channels ==
=== New channels ===
- 26 April - RaiNews 24
- 17 September - Game Network
- 16 December - Milan TV

== Deaths ==
Date	Name	Age	Cinematic Credibility
8 June	Corrado Mantoni	74	Italian radio & television host
19 June	Mario Soldati	92	Writer and TV author and presenter
