= 1997 in Italian television =

This is a list of Italian television related events from 1997.

== Events ==
The RAI-Mediaset duopoly shows the first signs of crisis; several shows by the two estates are suspended or change their host for low ratings, while the new media, as Internet and the satellite television, spread also in Italy.

- July 31. The Maccanico law, ruling the telecommunications, is approved by Italian Parliament. A single subject is forbidden to own more than 20% of national networks and 30% of the economic resources; RAI 3 must become a service channel, publicity free; AGCOM (Autorità per le garanzie nelle comunicazioni) is instituted. The law should terminate the RAI-Mediaset duopoly, but its concrete application is postponed to 2003 (actually, it will remain on paper).

=== RAI ===
- February 22: Jalisse, an almost unknown duo, with the song Fiumi di parole, wins the 1997 Sanremo music festival, hosted by Mike Bongiorno (for the eleventh and last time) and Piero Chiambretti. Paola e Chiara, with Amici come prima, win among the new proposals.
- March 16: Mara Venier announces live, and crying out, to leave RAI for Mediaset; her program, Domenica in, is RAI's flagship show, also if many critics consider it a typical example of trash TV. For Venier, as for many other RAI defectors, the experience in Mediaset will be disappointing.
- June 23: RAI 3 airs the first episode of Friends.
- September 29: the first RAI satellite channel, RAISAT 2, aimed to the youngest ones, begins broadcasting. Soon, the entertainment channel RAISAT 1 (October 27) and the educational RAISAT 3 (October 13) and Uninettuno University TV (November 10) follow. All the four channels are free.
- October 9: Dario Fo, in a car with the actress Ambra Angiolini for an episode of the show Milano-Roma, (see below) learns by some fans to have won the Nobel Prize for literature. The RAI cameras shot the historical moment.
- November 3: Enrico Montesano leaves, for low ratings, the hosting of Saturday evening show Fantastico Enrico; Giancarlo Magalli takes his place, with slightly better results. It's the last edition of Fantastico, the most popular RAI show in the Eighties.
- November 15: the match Italy-Russia, for 1998 FIFA World Cup qualification, it's the 1997 most seen TV program, with 16.700.000 viewers.

=== Private channels ===
- March 4: on TMC, the dating show Strettamente personale shows, for the first time in Italy, a young gay (the Croatian Elvis Busic) looking for a stable relationship with another man. The program arouses many controversies by the Catholics.
- April 14: TMC rips off from RAI part of the TV rights on Serie A and particularly the one to the synthesis of a match, traditionally broadcast the Sunday evening. RAI serves the exclusive on the match of the National team, for fifty billion liras.
- September 1. MTV Italia begins to broadcast, with the Nirvana concert MTV unplugged in New York, recorded 4 years before; the new channel is guest of Rete A frequencies.
- September 20, the newborn MTV Italia organizes and airs a U2 concert form Reggio Emilia with the presence of several emerging Italian bands.
- November 27: Mike Bongiorno celebrates his fifty years of career (he debuted on radio in 1947) and enters in the Guinness World records as the TV presenter been active for the longest time, with 7500 presences in video.

=== Pay TV ===
- February. Stream TV, the second pay digital platform in Italy, owned by STET, begins to broadcast by cable.
- Spring The French group Canal Plus gets the 90% of Tele+, ousting Leo Kirch. The Italian versions of Bloomberg and Hallmark are added to Tele+ Satellite.
- September 1. General reorder of the Tele+ offer. The air channels Tele+ 1 and Tele+2 become Tele+bianco (cinema) and Tele+nero (sport). The platform Tele+satellite becomes D+ and is enriched by new channels: Tele+Calcio, (airing live the Serie A matches), Telepiù 16/9, (the first Italian TV in the broader format), Marcopolo (travels), Eurosport (Italian version) and INN (all news).
- November 15 The Italian version of Canal Jimmy make its debut on D+.

== Awards ==
14. Telegatto award, for the season 1996-1997.

- Show of the year: Anima mia.
- Man and woman of the year: Paolo Bonolis and Maria De Filippi.
- Best TV movie: Caro maestro 2.
- Best serial: Dio vede e provvede (for Italy) and ER (for abroad).
- Best soap opera: The bold and the beautiful.
- Best quiz: Tira & molla.
- Best variety: Paperissima.
- Best talk show: Maurizio Costanzo show.
- Best satirical show: Striscia la notizia.
- Best Music show: Sanremo music festival 1997
- Best magazine: Target.
- Best sport magazine: Quelli che... il calcio.
- Best show for children: Solletico.
- Lifetime achievement awards: Eli Wallach and Enzo Biagi.
- Special awards: Mi manda Lubrano (for the service TV), Porta a porta, Mrs. Gabriella Pontone (reader of Sorrisi e Canzoni) and Johnny Deep (for the cinema in TV).

== Debuts ==
=== RAI ===
==== Serials ====
- Linda e il brigadiere (Linda and the brigadier) – detective comedy, by Gianfrancesco Lazotti and Alberto Simone; 3 seasons. Nino Manfredi plays a retired police brigadier who constantly interferes with the work and the private life of his daughter (Claudia Koll), she too police officer; in the third seasons, the Koll's character dies and her place in the life of the brigadier is taken by a young colored girl (Caterina Deregibus), his helper in a detective agency.
- Un prete tra noi (A priest among us) by Giorgio Capitani and Lodovico Gasparini, with Massimo Dapporto, as the prison chaplain Don Marco, and Giovannia Ralli; 2 seasons.

==== Variety ====
- Milano Roma – reality show; 5 seasons (one on Italia 1) and a restart in 2016. The program follows the travel by car of a couple of VIP from Milan to Rome.
- Furore, music game with VIP as contenders, Italian version of the French La fureur, hosted by Alessandro Greco; 7 seasons more a reprisal for the twenty years of the show..
- Per tutta la vita? – game show reserved to couples about to get married, Italian version of the French Pour la vie, hosted by Fabrizio Frizzi; 6 seasons more a reprisal in 2012.

==== News ====
- A sua immagine (in his image) – religious program aimed to the Catholics, hosted by Lorena Bianchetti and others; again on air.
- Pinocchio – program of journalistic insight hosted by Gad Lerner; 2 seasons.
- Pole position – magazine about Formula One; 21 seasons.
- TG2 motori – column about motors, again on air.

==== Educational ====
- La grande storia (again on air) and La storia siamo noi (hosted by Giovanni Minoli, on air till 2013) – cycles of historic documentaries, focused on the Twentieth Century.
- Magazzini Einstein – documentaries about art and culture; on air till 2013.
- Speciale Superquark (spin-off of Superquark, hosted by Piero Angela, on air till 2015) and Passaggio a Nord-ovest (North-West passage, hosted by his son Alberto Angela, again on air) – programs of popular science, history and travels.

==== For children ====
- Lupo Alberto – cartoon from the comic strip by Silver, the protagonist is voiced by Francesco Salvi; 2 seasons.
- Glu-glu – block-programming of cartoons on RAI SAT 2, one of the first RAI show realized for the satellite; 2 seasons.

=== Mediaset ===
==== Serials ====
- Doctor Giorgia – medical drama with Barbara D’Urso; 3 seasons (the third one realized after a 20 years break-up).
- Due per tre (Two parents for three sons) – sitcom with Johnny Dorelli and Loretta Goggi; 3 seasons.

==== Variety ====
- Sarabanda – musical quiz, inspired by Name that tune and hosted by Enrico Papi and Teo Mammuccari; 10 seasons (Italian record for a musical show, with 1777 episodes, specials included). The show gets a wide public success, so much so that its timetable is often changed to not harm the other Mediaset programs. It arouses yet several controversies about the regularity of the contest.
- Ciro il figlio di target (Ciro, the Target's son) – satirical variety ideated by Gregorio Paolini, hosted by Gaia De Laurentis and Enrico Bertolino, with various comic actors, among which Luciana Litizzetto stands out; 5 seasons (with slightly different titles).

==== News and educational ====
- Le iene (The hyenas) – infotainment show, Italian version of the Argentinian Caiga quien caiga, with various hosts, generally female (Simona Ventura, Alessia Marcuzzi, Ilary Blasy, Nadia Toffa); again on air. It's a mix of reportages and interviews, realized, often in a very provocative tone, by actors dressed as the Reservoir dogs’ characters. The program, despite the charges of sensationalism, is now again one of the most successful of the Italian television ad has generated several special editions and spin-off.
- La macchina del tempo (Time machine) – show of popular science, hosted by Alessandro Cecchi Paone, considered the Mediaset answer to the Piero Angela's programs in RAI; 9 seasons and a reprisal.
- Fuego – magazine aimed to the young ones, hosted by Alessia Marcuzzi and others; 3 seasons.
- Angeli (Angels) – magazine about spirituality and ESP experiences, hosted by Marco Liorni; 3 seasons and a reprisal.

=== Other channels ===
- Hitslist Italia (till 2016) and MTV select (till 2005): musical shows on MTV Italia.

== Television shows ==
=== Rai ===
==== Drama ====
- Vajont 9 ottobre 1963, orazione civile (Vajont 9 October 1963, civil oraction) – monologue by Marco Paolini (author and interpreted). The show is broadcast live on RAI 2 for the 34th anniversary of the Vajont disaster, in a theatre build on the dam's place, and gets 3 million and a half of viewers.
- David by Robert Markowitz, with Nathaniel Parker in the title role and Solomon by Roger Young, with Ben Cross in the title role; seventh and eighth chapter of the Lux Vide Bible project.
- La piovra 8 – Lo scandalo (The scandal) by Giacomo Battiato, with Raoul Bova and Primo Reggiani; 2 episodes. Prequel of La piovra franchise, it describes the beginning of the Tano Cariddi's criminal career in the Sicily of the Fifties.
- Nessuno escluso (Nobody excluded) – by Massimo Spano, with Ennio Fantastichini and Giancarlo Giannini; a Mafia business consultant redeems himself working for DIA.
- Teo – by Cinzia Th Torrini, with Ludgero Fortes Dos Santos –a young Somali saves an Italian girl abused by the stepfather.
- Un giorno fortunato (A lucky day) – by Massimo Martelli, with Fabio Fazio, in his only role as an actor, and Claudio Bisio; tv-movie about the daily work of a public service psychologist.
- Il padre di mia figlia (The father of my daughter) – by Livia Giampalmo, with Davide Bigazzi and Sabrina Ferilli; comedy about the consequences of the assisted reproduction.

===== Biopics =====
- Padre Pio da Petralcina, by Alberto Rondalli, with Antonio Buil Pejo in the title role.
- Don Milani, il priore di Barbiana (The Barbiana prior) – by Andrea and Antonio Frazzi, biopic with Sergio Castellitto (in the title role) and Ilaria Occhini.
- La casa bruciata (The burn-out house) – by Massimo Spano, with Giulio Scarpati; inspired by the true story of Ezechiele Ramin.

==== Miniseries ====
- Mamma per caso (The accidental mum) – by Sergio Martino; romantic comedy in 4 episodes with Raffaella Carrà and Maurizio Crozza. A career anchorwoman, always a single, is forced to take care of her three nephews.
- Il conto Montecristo (The Montecristo account) – by Ugo Gregoretti, with Corso Salani, Imma Piro and Alessio Boni; parody of Alexandre Dumas’ The count of Montecristo, transferred in the time of Mani pulite.
- Racket – by Luigi Perelli, with Michele Placido. A restaurant owner, former policeman, fights against the Sacra Corona Unita racket.
- Noi siamo angeli – by Ruggero Deodato, with Bud Spencer, Philip Michael Thomas and Kabir Bedi; in Costa Rica, two fake friars (actually, escaped inmates) become protectors of the weak and oppressed.

==== Serials ====
- L’avvocato delle donne (The women's lawyer) – legal drama with Mariangela Melato, from the book of the feminist lawyer Tina Lagostena Bassi.
- In nome della famiglia (In name of the family) – by Vincenzo Verdecchi, with Ivo Garrani and Elisabetta Cavallotti; soap-opera about the vicissitudes of the Carraras, a family of publishers. It lasts just a season; later, it has a follow-up (Ricominciare), the same unsuccessful.
- Disokkupati (Unemployed) – demented sit-com directed and interpreted by Pier Francesco Loche, with Paolo Ferrari and Sabina Impacciatore; it tells the uneasy cohabitation between an aged retiree and his lodgers, three young unemployed.

===== Cartoons =====
- Pimpa, le nuove avventure (The new adventures of Pimpa) – directed by Enzo D’Alò.
- Princess Sissi by Bruno Bianchi, coproduced with France 3; fairy-tale biography of Empress Elisabeth of Austria, fully unrelated to the historical reality.

==== Variety ====
- Anima mia – hosted by Fabio Fazio and Claudio Baglioni, it's the public and critic success of the year. The show recalls, with tenderness and irony, the pop culture of the Seventies, also in its most kitsch sides; many forgotten stars of the decades are guest in studio (as I cugini di campagna, whose tune gives the name to the program).
- Macao – by Gianni Boncompagni, hosted by Alba Parietti and, later, by the “virtual showman” Mr. P. The show, too experimental and nonsense for the audience, is suspended for low ratings; however, it reveals young comic actresses, as Sabina Impacciatore and Paola Cortellesi.
- Pippo Chennedy Show – satirical variety hosted by Serena Dandini, with Corrado and Sabina Guzzanti and Neri Marcorè. The actors play now famous personalities of politics and entertainment (as Silvio Berlusconi, impersonated by Sabina Guzzanti), now imaginary characters, inspired by social phomenons (as the narcissistic TV anchorman Pippo Chennedy, impersonated by Corrado Guzzanti).
- Colorado – game show of the early evening, hosted by Alessandro Greco (substituted by Carlo Conti for low ratings).
- Va ora in onda (And now on air) – comic variety with Carlo Conti and Giorgio Panariello.

==== News and educational ====
- Mani pulite – cycle of four documentaries, care of Pino Corrias and others.
- The Kremlin's archives – care of Arrigo Levi.

=== Mediaset ===
==== Drama and comedy ====
- Fatima – by Fabrizio Costa, with Joaquim de Almeida and Caterina Furlado, romanced story of the Marian apparitions in Fatima.
- Da cosa nasce cosa (One thing lead to another) – by Andrea Manni, with Enzo Iachetti. An unemployed actor improvises butler for a community of neurotic women.
- Ladri si nasce (You are born a thief) – by Pier Francesco Pingitore, with Pippo Franco, Serena Grandi and Leo Gullotta; eleven chained sketches, in each of which a bribe is paid.
- Non chiamatemi papà (Don't call me dad) – by Ninì Salerno, with Jerry Calà and Umberto Smaila; the family life of a jazz musician is upset by his guest, a friend just separated from his wife.
- Fantaghirò 5, with Alessandra Martines and Remo Girone as antagonist, last chapter of the Fantaghirò franchise; in 2 parts. and La principessa e il povero (The princess and the poor), similar fantasy romance in international coproduction, with Anna Falchi, Lorenzo Crespi and Max von Sydow, both directed by Lamberto Bava.

==== Miniseries ====
- L’avvocato Porta – by Franco Giraldi, with Gigi Proietti and Ornella Muti; 4 episodes. A washed-up lawyer regains his professional skills and his wife's love, defending an innocent. The series has two sequels in 2000, with Maria Grazia Cucinotta replacing Muti.
- Desert of fire – by Enzo G. Castellari, with Anthony Delon, Giuliano Gemma and Mandala Tayde. A young French orphan, adopted and grown by a Tuareg tribe, looks of his family
- The Odissey – by Andrei Konchalovsky, with Armand Assante, Greta Scacchi and Isabella Rossellini; great international production from the Homer's’ poem.
- Dove comincia il sole (Where the sun begins) – by Rodolfo Roberti, with Barbara De Rossi and Christian Kohlund; the tormented love story between two persons, both already happily married.

==== Serials ====
- Io e la mamma (Me and Mummy), sit com with the presenter Jerry Scotti, (debuting as an actor) as a mature single, and Delia Scala (in her last role) as his mother.
- Tutti gli uomini sono uguali (All the males are the same), sit-com with Enzo Decaro and Randi Ingermann, from the Spanish movie Todos los hombres sois iguales; about an unusual community, composed by three divorced men living together and a charming maid.
- I misteri di cascina Vianello (Vianello farm mysteries) – second spin-off of Casa Vianello, now in the mood of the detective comedy. The couple Raimondo Vianello and Sandra Mondaini is sided by a gallant carbineers’ officer (Andrea Roncato).
- AleX – by Giancarlo Soldi, ideated by Alfredo Castelli, with Romina Mondello; a girl, university student, investigates the great historical mysteries.
- Simba è nato un re (Simba, a king is born) – cartoons, imitating The lion king, produced by Mondo Cartoon.

==== Variety ====
- 6 del mestiere? (Are you of the trade?)– game show with Claudio Lippi and Luana Ravegnini, Italian version of Pwy di Pwy?; two contenders have to guess the work of six workers present in the studio.
- Dillo a Wally (Tell Wally it) – comic variety with Gene Gnocchi, parody of the trashing talk show.
- Il gatto e la volpe (The cat and the fox) – game show hosted by Paolo Bonolis.
- Volevo salutare (I wanted to say hello) – musical show with Linus and Albertino, the first in Italy to be aired simultaneously on TV (Italia 1) and on radio (Radio Deejay).

In the fall, no less than four Mediaset variety are suspended for low ratings:

- 100 milioni più IVA (100 millions and IVA) – musical quiz hosted by Iva Zanicchi, suspended after the first number and then reprised.
- Ciao Mara – talk show hosted by Mara Venier.
- Tiramisù – game show hosted by Pippo Baudo.
- Una volta al mese (Once by month) – monthly variety hosted by Pippo Baudo; the program is talked about above all for the lapses in taste committed by Baudo, usually a very professional presenter.

=== Other channels ===
- A casa loro (Odeon and Telecampione) – financial magazine.
- Televiscion (Telenorba) – sit-com by Gerardo Nunziante with Emilio Soflrizzi; a parody of the trash TV already then in vogue on the major Italian televisions.through a fictional quiz reserved to the married couples and aired by a Bari television.

== Networks and services ==
=== Launches ===
Network	Type	Launch date	Notes	Source
Classica HD	Cable and satellite	Unknown		
Discovery Channel	Cable and satellite	1 September		
Hallmark Channel	Cable and satellite	1 September		

=== Conversions and rebrandings ===
Old network name	New network name	Type	Conversion Date	Notes	Source

=== Closures ===
Network	Type	Closure date	Notes	Source

== Ending this year ==
- Caro maestro
- Ciack
- Luna Park
- Non dimenticate lo spazzolino da denti
- Più sani e più belli
- Se io fossi... Sherlock Holmes
- Sotto a chi tocca
- Telemenù
- Ultimo minuto

== Deaths ==
- January 1: Franco Volpi, actor (75)
- January 3: Enzo Avallone, dancer (41)
- May 19: Paolo Panelli, comic actor (71)
- November 11: Ave Ninchi, actress (82)
- December 4: Alberto Manzi, teacher, writer and host of educational TV programs (73)
