= Nicola Pistoia =

Italian actor, director, and playwright

- Born: 31 March 1954 (age 71); Rome, Italy
- Occupation(s): Actor, director
- Height: 1.76 m (5 ft 9 in)

Nicola Pistoia (born 31 March 1954) is an Italian actor, director and playwright.

== Life and career ==
Born in Rome, Pistoia became first known thanks to his association with actor and playwright Pino Ammendola, with whom he wrote and starred in a large number of successful comedy plays. Later, Pistoia himself directed a number of plays he wrote, including Binario and Sono emozionato. Also active in films and on television, in 2001 he made his film directorial debut with Stregati dalla luna, an adaptation of one of his stage works.

== Selected filmography ==
- Little Misunderstandings (1989)
- Vietato ai minori (1992)
- Quattro bravi ragazzi (1993)
- Caro maestro (TV, 1996-1997)
- L'avvocato Porta (TV, 1997-2000)
- Finalmente soli (TV, 1999–2004)
- Viva l'Italia (2012)
- Invisibles (2025)
