= Finalmente soli =

- Genre: Sitcom
- Starring: Gerry Scotti; Maria Amelia Monti; Rosalina Neri; Nicola Pistoia; Pino Ammendola; Alessandro De Padova; Elisabetta Saccani
- Country of origin: Italy
- No. of seasons: 5
- No. of episodes: 90

Original release
- Network: Canale 5
- Release: September 19, 1999 – May 23, 2004

Finalmente soli is an Italian sitcom. It is a spin-off of Io e la mamma. After the closing of the series, three TV-movies were produced between 2007 and 2008.

== Cast ==
- Gerry Scotti: Gigi Mantelli
- Maria Amelia Monti: Alice Fumagalli
- Rosalina Neri: Wanda
- Nicola Pistoia: Spartaco Ceccacci
- Pino Ammendola: Gambardella
- Francesca Rettondini: Cinzia
- Milena Miconi
- Sylvie Lubamba

== See also ==
- List of Italian television series
