= Lorena Cacciatore =

Italian actress (born 1987)

- Born: 30 September 1987 (age 38); Palermo, Italy
- Occupation: Actress
- Years active: 2004–present
- Partner: Federico Marchetti
- Children: 1

Lorena Cacciatore (born 30 September 1987) is an Italian actress.

== Biography ==
Born in Palermo, Cacciatore suffered from bullimia, which depleted after marrying her husband. Upon graduation from psycho-pedagogical high school "Finocchiaro Aprile" in the Sicilian capital, she moved to Rome to become a student of the Accademia Nazionale di Arte Drammatica Silvio D'Amico, which she left after the first year due to the filming of Agrodolce.

Cacciatore made her acting debut on RAI in 2009, playing Eleonora Scaffidi in the soap opera Agrodolce. In 2011, she played Anna in La vita che corre, a mini-series directed by Fabrizio Costa. The following year, Cacciatore co-starred in Love Is Not Perfect directed by Francesca Muci with actress Anna Foglietta, playing the role of Adriana. Following her academic experience, Cacciatore continued her training through internships abroad, working with some actor coaches of the Actors Studios in New York. After her cinema debut, she took part in numerous RAI series – including Season 11 of Don Matteo – playing mostly dramatic and controversial roles.

Cacciatore was in a relationship with Alessio Vassalo. After their breakup, she married football goalkeeper Federico Marchetti. They welcomed their child on 26 September 2021.

== Filmography ==
=== Film ===
- L'ultimo re, directed by Aurelio Grimaldi (2010)
- Love Is Not Perfect, directed by Francesca Muci (2012)
- Mi rifaccio il trullo, directed by Vito Cea (2016)
- Se mi vuoi bene, directed by Fausto Brizzi (2019)

=== Television series ===
- Fuori corso, directed by Vincenzo Coppola – TV series (2004)
- Agrodolce, TV series (2009)
- La vita che corre, directed by Fabrizio Costa – TV series (2011)
- Rosso San Valentino, directed by Fabrizio Costa – TV series (2012)
- Provaci ancora prof! – TV series (2012)
- Un posto al sole – TV series (2014)
- Che Dio ci aiuti, directed by Francesco Vicario – TV series (2014)
- Il paradiso delle signore, directed by Monica Vullo – TV series (2015)
- Tutto può succedere, directed by Lucio Pellegrini – TV series (2015-2018)
- Baciato dal sole, directed by Antonello Grimaldi – TV series (2016)
- Sirene, directed by Davide Marengo – TV series (2017)
- L'ispettore Coliandro, directed by Manetti Bros. – TV series (2017)
- Don Matteo – TV series, 3 episodes (2018)
- Thou Shalt Not Kill, - TV series, 2 episodes (2018)
- Mudù 9, directed by Vito Cea – sitcom (2020)
- Mina Settembre, directed by Tiziana Aristarco – TV series (2021)
- Belli Ciao (2022)
