= Dario Vergassola =

Italian actor (born 1957)

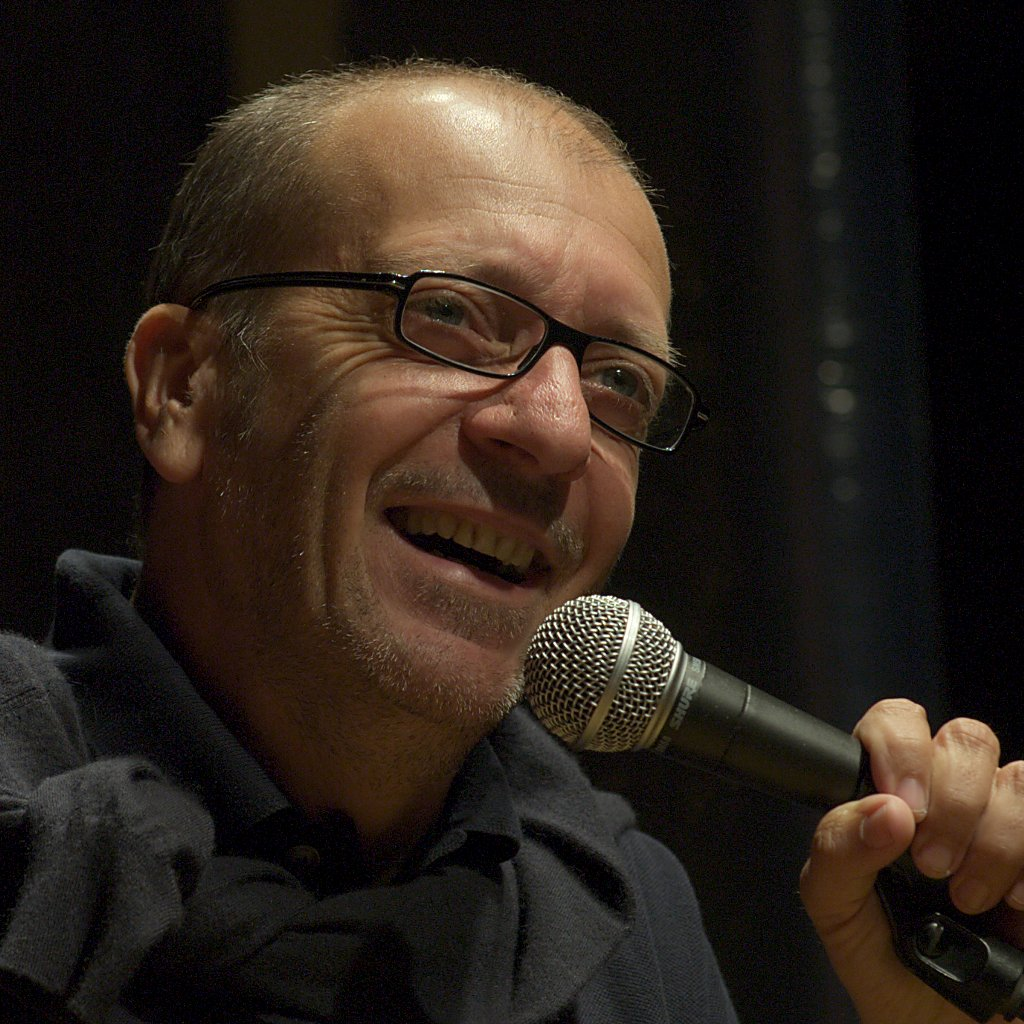
- Dario Vergassola in 2009
- Born: 3 May 1957 (age 68); La Spezia, Liguria, Italy
- Occupation(s): Comedian, actor, author, singer-songwriter, presenter
- Years active: 1988–present

Dario Vergassola (born 3 May 1957) is an Italian comedian, actor, author, singer-songwriter, television and radio presenter.

== Career ==
He has worked with all the main Italian television broadcasters and is known for his participation as a comedian in shows such as Maurizio Costanzo Show, Zelig, Mai dire Gol, Parla con me, 2Next, Cartabianca and Quelli che il calcio. He also hosted or co-hosted Bulldozer, Kilimangiaro, Sei in un Paese meraviglioso and two editions of the Concerto del Primo Maggio (2014–15).

Vergassola played recurring roles as Erminio in the series Dio vede e provvede and Pippo Santi in Carabinieri. He also released two studio albums and published several books with Mondadori, Feltrinelli and Baldini & Castoldi.

== Filmography ==
Film
| Year | Title | Role | Notes |
|---|---|---|---|
| 1992 | Anni 90 | | |
| 1997 | Nuda proprietà vendesi | Vinicio | TV film |
| 1997 | Grazie di tutto | Lorenzo | |
| 2002 | L'erba proibita | Himself | Documentary |
| 2004 | InvaXön: Alieni in Liguria | President of Liguria | |
| 2008 | The Early Bird Catches the Worm | Claudio Cecchetto | |
| 2009 | L'ultimo Crodino | Callisto | |
| 2012 | Lost in Laos | Daniela's father | |
| 2022 | The Voyagers | Fascist at the concert | |

Television
| Year | Title | Role | Notes |
|---|---|---|---|
| 1996–1997 | Dio vede e provvede | Erminio | TV series |
| 2001 | Via Zanardi 33 | Photographer | Sit-com |
| 2002–2007 | Carabinieri | Filippo Santi | TV series; main role |
| 2007 | InvaXön – Alieni nello spazio | President of Liguria | TV series |

== Discography ==
=== Studio albums ===
- Manovale gentiluomo (Mercury, 1992)
- Lunga vita ai pelandroni (Sony Music, 1999)

=== Singles ===
- "Mario (Marta)" (1992)
