= Karin Proia =

Italian actress (born 1974)

- Born: 14 March 1974 (age 52); Latina, Italy
- Occupation: Actress
- Years active: 1994–present

Karin Proia (born 14 March 1974) is an Italian actress who began acting in 1994. She has also directed.

Movies she has appeared in include the Italian movies The Crusaders, the comedy Five Stormy Days and Wasteland.

She has also appeared in television dramas, including Amico mio 2, Avvocato Porta, Shoo Shoo and Lo zio d'America.

Her stage performances include Catherine in A View from the Bridge (Italy, 1995) and Shelby in Steel Magnolias (Italy, 1997).

== Biography ==
Proia was born in Latina, Italy. An actress since 1994, she works in theatre, cinema and television in Italy and abroad. She worked such as leading-actress with directors as Joseph Sargent, Dominique Othenin-Girard, Michele Placido and close to actors such as Henry Cavill, Joe Mantegna, Emmanuelle Seigner, Valeria Golino, Giancarlo Giannini, Burt Young, Armin Mueller-Stahl.

In 1990 she obtained the "theory, solfeggio and musical dictation" diploma at the Conservatory "L. Refice" in Frosinone. She plays piano and she sings.

In 1991 she obtained the diploma of "Master of Art" at the State Institute of Art "J. Romani" in Velletri, Italy and in 1993 the diploma of "Applied Art" at the same Institute, specializing in "Art of Ceramics".

From 1991 to 1994 she attended some seminars: acting, diction, movement, theatral fencing at the "S.A.T (I.A.L.S)" of Rome and a course of mime at the "Perfecta of Latina".

In 1993 she enrolled at Sapienza University of Rome in Literature DMS (Study of the performing arts) where she also attended a class of "psichodrama" with prof. Ferruccio Di Cori.

She studied dancing and she trained in skating, archery and competitive swimming.

In 2006 she attended a course of "editing" in Rome. The short film Farfallina is her first film as director.

In 2016, she directed her first feature film, Una gita a Roma (An outing to Rome), prizewinning in Canada, Italy and Russia.

=== Filmography ===
Year	Title	Director	Notes
1997	Five Stormy Days	Francesco Calogero	
1997	A View from the Bridge	Luciano Odorisio	TV RAIDUE
1997	L'avvocato Porta	Franco Giraldi	TV Series CANALE 5
1998	Amico mio 2	Paolo Poeti	TV Series CANALE 5
1999	Terra bruciata	Fabio Segatori	
1999	La vita che verrà	Pasquale Pozzessere	TV Series RAIDUE
1999	Lui e lei 2	Luciano Manuzzi, Elisabetta Lodoli	Episodes 1/4 by Manuzzi, 5/8 by Lodoli; TV Series RAIUNO
2000	Vola Sciusciù	Joseph Sargent	TV Movie
2000	Week-end	Paola Columba	Short Film
2000	Don Matteo	Enrico Oldoini	TV Series RAIUNO
2000	Arresti domiciliari	Stefano Calvagna	
2001	Crociati	Dominique Othenin-Girard	TV Series
2001	Vendetta	Dennis Berry	Aka Hotel Laguna
2002	Lo zio d'America	Rossella Izzo	TV Series RAIUNO
2004	Vite a perdere	Paolo Bianchini	TV Series RAIDUE
2005	Orgoglio capitolo secondo	Vittorio De Sisti, Giorgio Serafini, Alessandro Capone	TV Series RAIUNO
2005	Ho sposato un calciatore	Stefano Sollima	TV Series CANALE 5
2008	Boris 2	Giacomo Ciarrapico, Mattia Torre, Luca Vendruscolo	TV Series FOX
2009	Salomè – una storia	Raffaele Buranelli	Short Film
2010	Boris 3	Davide Marengo	TV Series
2010	L'importanza di piacere ai gatti	Claudia Nannuzzi	Short Film
2010	Italia bella mostrati gentile	Augusto Fornari	Short Film
2010	Area Paradiso	Diego Abatantuono, Armando Trivellini	
2011	Boris – Il film	Giacomo Ciarrapico, Mattia Torre, Luca Vendruscolo	
2011	Walter Chiari – fino all'ultima risata	Enzo Monteleone	TV Series RAIUNO
2011	Le tre rose di Eva	Raffaele Mertes, Vincenzo Verdecchi	TV Series CANALE 5
2012	Ragazze a mano armata	Fabio Segatori	
2013	Le tre rose di Eva 2	Raffaele Mertes, Vincenzo Verdecchi	TV Series CANALE 5
2013	Ombrelloni	Riccardo Grandi	TV Series RAIDUE
2013	The Homecoming	Olaf Kreinsen	
2015	Le tre rose di Eva 3	Raffaele Mertes, Vincenzo Verdecchi	TV Series CANALE 5
2017	Una gita a Roma	Karin Proia	(An Outing to Rome)
2017	Le tre rose di Eva 4	Raffaele Mertes, Vincenzo Verdecchi	TV Series CANALE 5

=== Theatre ===
- A View from the Bridge by Arthur Miller, director Teodoro Cassano (1995/1998) Character: Catherine
- Steel Magnolias by Robert Harling, director Teodoro Cassano (1997/1998) Character: Shelby
- Denise Calls Up by Hal Salwen, director Pino Quartullo (2005) Character: Martina
- Liolà by Luigi Pirandello, director Gigi Proietti (2006) Character: Tuzza
- Uomini sull'orlo di una crisi di nervi 2 by Rosario Galli & Alessandro Capone, director Marco Simeoli (2008) Character: Livia
- Quel venticinque Luglio a Villa Torlonia by Pier Francesco Pingitore, director Pier Francesco Pingitore (2010)
- Terms of Endearment by Dan Gordon, director Gino Zampieri (2010) Character: Emma Horton

=== Director ===
- Farfallina – Short Film (2008) – 10 min.
- Una gita a Roma (An outing to Rome) – Feature Film (2017)

=== Screenwriter ===
- Farfallina, director Karin Proia – Short Film (2008) – 10 min.
- Salomè – una storia, director Raffaele Buranelli – Short Film (2009) – 13 min. – winner Opera IMAIE award 2009
- Una gita a Roma (An outing to Rome) – Feature Film (2017)
