= Rosalina Neri =

Italian actress (1927–2024)

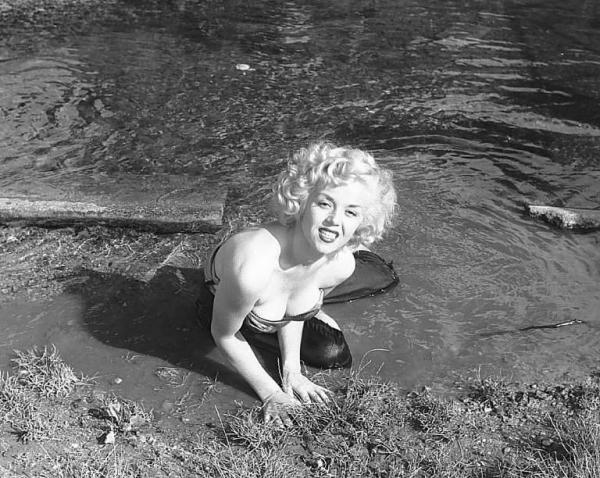
- Neri in 1954
- Born: 12 November 1927; Arcisate, Italy
- Died: 5 June 2024 (aged 96); Milan, Italy
- Occupation: Actress
- Years active: 1954–2020
- Partner: Jack Hylton
- Children: 1 daughter

Rosalina Neri (12 November 1927 – 5 June 2024) was an Italian stage, television, film and radio actress.

== Life and career ==
Born in Arcisate, Province of Varese, Neri started her career appearing in the 1954 Garinei & Giovannini's musical comedy Tobia la candina spia. She had her breakout with the Marcello Marchesi's RAI variety show Invito al sorriso, and got a lot of press coverage because of her resemblance to Marilyn Monroe, which led to her being labeled as the "Italian Marilyn Monroe" and nicknamed Marilina.

During a trip in England to shoot a television commercial, Neri met the conductor Jack Hylton, with whom she started a long romantic relationship and had a daughter, Angela. During her career she was mainly active on stage, where among others she worked with Giorgio Strehler and Umberto Simonetta.

Neri died in Milan on 5 June 2024, at the age of 96.

== Selected filmography ==
- I pinguini ci guardano (1956)
- Valeria ragazza poco seria (1958)
- Bocche cucite (1968)
- The Betrothed (TV, 1989)
- The House of Smiles (1991)
- Three Men and a Leg (1997)
- All the Moron's Men (1999)
- Finalmente soli (TV, 1999-2004)
- Il volto di un'altra (2012)
- The Predators (2020)
