= Love Is Not Perfect =

- Film poster
- Italian: L'amore è imperfetto
- Directed by: Francesca Muci
- Screenplay by: Francesca Muci; Gianni Romoli
- Based on: L’amore è imperfetto by Francesca Muci
- Produced by: Tilde Corsi; Gianni Romoli
- Starring: Anna Foglietta; Giulio Berruti
- Cinematography: Vittorio Omodei Zorini
- Music by: Manuel De Sica
- Production companies: R&C Produzioni; Rai Cinema
- Distributed by: 01 Distribution
- Release date: November 29, 2012
- Running time: 92 minutes
- Country: Italy
- Language: Italian

Love Is Not Perfect (Italian: L'amore è imperfetto) is a 2012 Italian romance film written and directed by Francesca Muci in her directorial debut, and starring Anna Foglietta and Giulio Berruti. The screenplay is based on the 2012 Italian novel of the same name, written by Francesca Muci.

Produced by Tilde Corsi and Gianni Romoli, Love Is Not Perfect premiered in Italy on 29 November 2012.

== Cast ==
- Anna Foglietta as Elena
- Giulio Berruti as Marco
- Bruno Wolkowitch as Ettore
- Lorena Cacciatore as Adriana
- Camilla Filippi as Roberta

== Plot ==
Thirty-five year old Elena works for a publishing house. She has chosen to live as a single woman after her long-lasting but unsatisfying relationship with Marco, a free-lance photographer, ended when she discovered him flirting with another man in a restaurant.

After a minor accident on a scooter she meets Adriana, a seductive young woman, and Ettore, an older man. Attracted to Adriana's unpredictability, which offers excitement and passion, and Ettore's calmness, which provides stability and security, Elena finds herself torn between the two and enters into a relationship with both in pursuit of love.

== See also ==
- List of Italian films of 2012
