= Se mi vuoi bene =

2019 Italian comedy film

- Theatrical release poster
- Directed by: Fausto Brizzi
- Written by: Fausto Brizzi; Herbert Simone Paragnani; Mauro Uzzeo; Martino Coli
- Produced by: Luca Barbareschi
- Starring: Claudio Bisio; Sergio Rubini; Flavio Insinna; Maria Amelia Monti; Lucia Ocone; Gianmarco Tognazzi
- Cinematography: Marcello Montarsi
- Edited by: Luciana Pandolfelli
- Music by: Bruno Zambrini
- Distributed by: Medusa Film
- Release date: 17 October 2019 (Italy)
- Running time: 104 minutes
- Country: Italy
- Language: Italian

Se mi vuoi bene (lit. 'If you love me') is a 2019 Italian romantic comedy film directed by Fausto Brizzi.

== Plot ==
Diego Anastasi, lawyer depressed, try to improve the live of his friends and relatives. He is helped by Massimiliano and Edoardo, of the store Chiacchiere.

== Cast ==
- Claudio Bisio as Diego Anastasi
- Sergio Rubini as Massimiliano
- Flavio Insinna as Edoardo
- Maria Amelia Monti as Giulia
- Lucia Ocone as Loredana
- Gianmarco Tognazzi as Alessandro
- Lorena Cacciatore as Laura
- Memo Remigi as Diego's father
- Valeria Fabrizi as Diego's mother
- Elena Santarelli as Daniela
- Susy Laude as Simona
- Dino Abbrescia as Luca
- Cochi Ponzoni as Bertoni
- Luca Carboni as himself
