= Amico mio =

- Also known as: My Friend
- Genre: Medical drama
- Directed by: Paolo Poeti
- Starring: Massimo Dapporto; Katharina Böhm; Maria Amelia Monti; Elisa Giani; Ugo Pagliai; Pierfrancesco Favino; Claudia Pandolfi; Salvatore Marino; Antonella Fattori; Paolo Scalondro; Inka Groetschel; Billie Zöckler; Désirée Nosbusch; Marianna Cristofaro; Karin Proia
- Countries of origin: Italy; Germany
- No. of seasons: 2
- No. of episodes: 14

Production
- Camera setup: Emilio Loffredo
- Running time: 90 minutes

Original release
- Network: Rai 2 Canale 5 Das Erste
- Release: December 7, 1993 – May 7, 1998

Amico mio (English: My Friend) is a 1993 Italian-German television series directed by Paolo Poeti. The show is set in a children's hospital, and stars Massimo Dapporto as Dr. Paolo Magri and Katharina Böhm and later Désirée Nosbusch in the role of Dr. Angela Mancinelli. Other actors include Maria Amelia Monti, Paolo Maria Scalondro, Pierfrancesco Favino, Claudia Pandolfi, Antonella Fattori, Billie Zöckler, and Riccardo Garrone. The series had two seasons: the first aired from December 7, 1993 to January 25, 1994 on Rai 2, and the season aired from April 9 to May 7 1998 on Rete 4.

== Plot ==
The series follows Doctor Magri and his colleagues in the pediatrics ward of the Hospital San Carlo di Nancy in Rome who are convinced that they must not only care for the health of their young patients but also investigate and involve themselves in their patients' family and social situations that are often at the source of their illnesses. The doctors must also fight against the bureaucratic red tape they find them and their patients mired in. As the series went on the personal life of Dr. Magri, in love with Dr. Angela Mancinelli, and that of Spillo (Adriano Pantaleo), a young orphan, are intertwined with the stories of the young patients of the hospital.

== Cast ==
- Massimo Dapporto: Dr. Paolo Magri
- Katharina Böhm: Dr. Angela Mancinelli (season 1)
- Desirée Nosbusch: Dr. Angela Mancinelli (season 2)
- Claudia Pandolfi: Susanna Calabrò (season 1)
- Karin Proia: Susanna Calabrò (season 2)
- Maria Amelia Monti: Clara
- Lisa Kreuzer: Angela's Mother
- Ugo Pagliai: Filippo Antognazzi
- Riccardo Garrone: Primario
- Pierfrancesco Favino: Beppe Vanni
- Cristiana Capotondi: Helene
- Adriano Pantaleo: Spillo
- Piero Natoli: Tony Greco
- Antonella Attili: Marinella

== See also ==
- List of Italian television series
