= Chi vuol essere milionario? =

2000 Italian TV game show

- Original logo as Chi vuol essere miliardario?
- Also known as: Chi vuol essere miliardario? (2000–2001); Chi vuol essere milionario? Edizione straordinaria (2008–2009); Chi vuol essere milionario? Il torneo (2025–present)
- Created by: David Briggs; Mike Whitehill; Steven Knight
- Presented by: Gerry Scotti
- Music by: Keith Strachan; Matthew Strachan; Ramon Covalo (2018 - 2020); Nick Magnus (2018 - present)
- Country of origin: Italy
- Original language: Italian
- No. of seasons: 16
- No. of episodes: 1,706

Production
- Production companies: Endemol (2000–2011); Wavy (2018–2020, 2025–present)

Original release
- Network: Canale 5
- Release: 22 May 2000 – 29 July 2011
- Release: 7 December 2018 – 5 November 2020
- Release: 7 December 2025 – 29 March 2026

Chi vuol essere milionario? (pronounced [ˈki vˌvwɔl ˈɛssere miljoˈnaːrjo]; English translation: Who wants to be a millionaire?), originally titled Chi vuol essere miliardario? (pronounced [ˈki vˌvwɔl ˈɛssere miljarˈdaːrjo]; English translation: Who wants to be a billionaire?), is an Italian game show based on the original British format of Who Wants to Be a Millionaire?. Every edition of the show has been hosted by Gerry Scotti and broadcast on Canale 5.

In the original version (Chi vuol essere miliardario?; 2000–2001), the main goal of the game was to win Lit. 1,000,000,000 by answering 15 multiple-choice questions correctly. There were three "lifelines" – 50:50, Phone-a-Friend and Ask the Audience. If a contestant answered the fifth question correctly, they left with at least Lit. 1,000,000. If a contestant answered the tenth question correctly, they left with at least Lit. 32,000,000. There was one winner of the show, Francesca Cinelli. In 2002, after the changeover to the euro, the show changed its name into Chi vuol essere milionario?.

In 2011, the Guinness World Records confirmed Gerry Scotti as the presenter who had hosted the most episodes of the Who Wants to Be a Millionaire? format (1,593, as of 5 May 2011). The record stood for many years, with 1,690 episodes hosted as of 5 November 2020.

== The game's prizes ==
Payout structure
Question number	Question value					
Question number	2000–2001	2002–2007	2008–2010	2010–2011	2018–2020	2025–
15 (10)	₤ 1,000,000,000 (€516,456)	€1,000,000				
14 (9)	₤ 500,000,000 (€258,228)	€300,000		€300,000		
13 (8)	₤ 250,000,000 (€129,114)	€150,000		€150,000		€200,000
12 (7)	₤ 125,000,000 (€64,557)	€70,000		€70,000		€150,000
11 (6)	₤ 64,000,000 (€33,053)	€35,000	€30,000	€30,000		€100,000
10 (5)	₤ 32,000,000 (€16,256)	€16,000	€20,000	€20,000		€70,000
9 (4)	₤ 16,000,000 (€8,263)	€8,000	€15,000	€15,000		€50,000
8 (3)	₤ 8,000,000 (€4,131)	€4,000	€10,000	€10,000		€30,000
7 (2)	₤ 4,000,000 (€2,065)	€2,000	€7,000	€7,000		€20,000
6 (1)	₤ 2,000,000 (€1,032)	€1,000	€5,000	€5,000		€10,000
5	₤ 1,000,000 (€516)	€500	€3,000	€3,000	€3,000	—N/a
4	₤ 500,000 (€258)	€300	€2,000	€2,000	€2,000	—N/a
3	₤ 300,000 (€154)	€200	€1,500	€1,500	€1,500	—N/a
2	₤ 200,000 (€103)	€100	€1,000	€1,000	€1,000	—N/a
1	₤ 100,000 (€51)	€50	€500	€500	€500	—N/a
Milestone Custom milestone Top prize

== Top prize winners ==
- Francesca Cinelli – Lit. 1,000,000,000 (18 March 2001)

Lit. 1,000,000,000 (15 of 15) – no time limit

If you were Albert King, what would be your profession?

1. Writer
2. Television journalist
3. Formula One driver
4. Musician(correct answer)
- Davide Pavesi – €1,000,000 (17 October 2004)

Ask the Audience results: A: 52% ⬥ B: 13% ⬥ C: 24% ⬥ D: 11%

€1,000,000 (15 of 15) – no time limit

The name of which scientist is mentioned along with Kant in the theory of the formation and evolution of the Solar System?
"Ask the Audience" lifeline used"

1. Laplace(correct answer)
2. Lavoisier
3. Faraday
4. Gauss
- Michela de Paoli – €1,000,000 (27 January 2011)

Ask the Audience Results: A: 15% ⬥ B: 52% ⬥ C: 17% ⬥ D: 16%

€1,000,000 (15 of 15) – no time limit

According to Genesis, which was the first action taken by Adam after leaving the Garden of Eden?
"50:50", "Phone a Friend" and "Ask the Audience" lifelines used

1. Offered sacrifices to God
2. Worked the land(answer was eliminated either using the 50:50 lifeline or by choosing it while using the Double Dip lifeline)
3. Joined Eve(correct answer)
4. Built a house(answer was eliminated either using the 50:50 lifeline or by choosing it while using the Double Dip lifeline)
- Enrico Remigio – €1,000,000 (29 January 2020)

€1,000,000 (15 of 15) – no time limit

What did Gene Cernan, the last man who set foot on the moon, leave written on the moon?

1. The symbol of peace
2. The initials of his daughter(correct answer)
3. God Bless America
4. Gene Was Here
- Vittoria Licari – €1,000,000 (14 December 2025)

€1,000,000 (10 of 10) – no time limit

"Years later, as he faced the firing squad": which novel starts like this?

1. One Hundred Years of Solitude(correct answer)
2. The Plague
3. Doctor Zhivago
4. Crime and Punishment
