= Sylvie Lubamba =

Italian model, showgirl and TV presenter (born 1972)

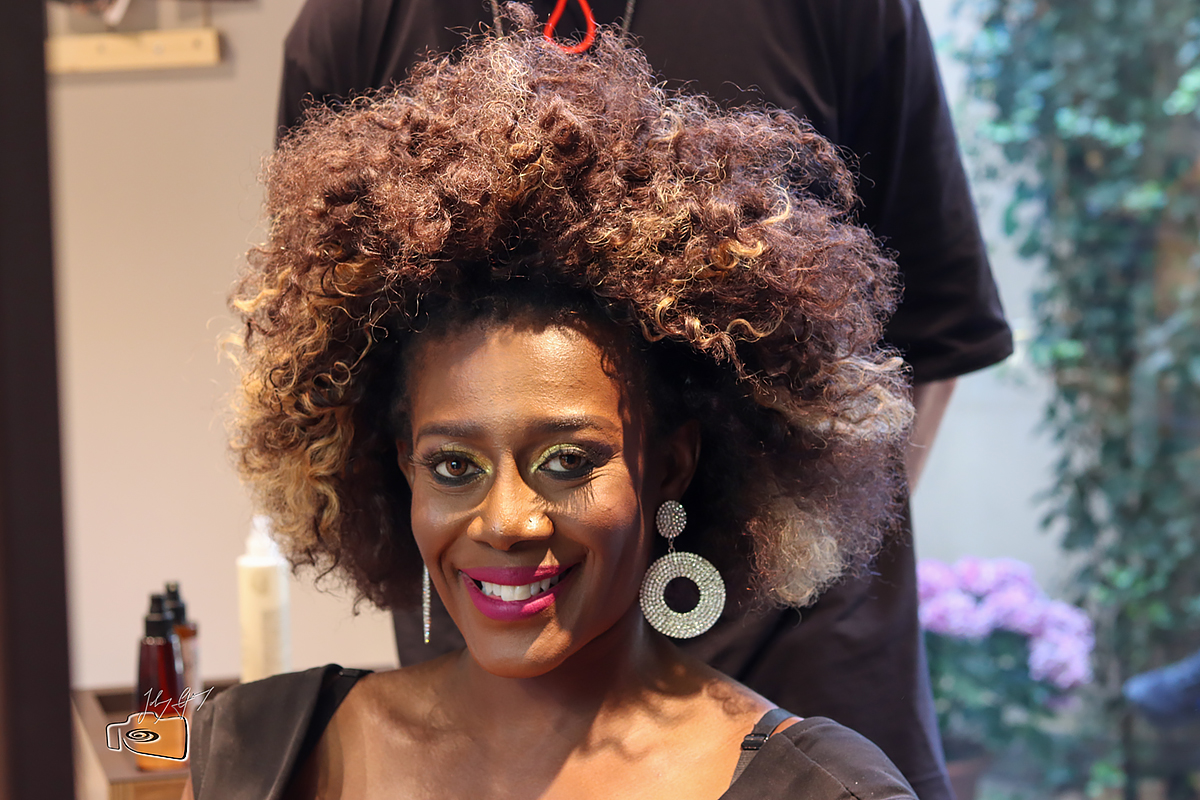
- Born: Renée Sylvie Lubamba; 29 February 1972 (age 54); Florence, Italy
- Occupations: Showgirl, model, television personality
- Height: 175 cm (5 ft 9 in)

Sylvie Lubamba (born Renée Sylvie Lubamba on 29 February 1972) is an Italian model, showgirl and TV presenter.

== Biography ==
Lubamba was born in Florence to parents from Kinshasa. She studied in a Piarists College and in 1992 was elected Miss Toscana. After some years as a model, and with minor roles in TV shows, she became Letterina ("Letter-carrier") in Canale 5's Passaparola. She later participated in the Italian version of The Farm.

In 1998 she began her television career in the program Guida al campionato with Alberto Brandi. In 2004 she had her most successful moment as a soubrette of the Markette conducted by Piero Chiambretti on La7. In 2005 she participated in the reality show The Mole. She speaks fluent English and French.

In January 2006, the penal court of Grosseto sentenced her to five months and twenty days in jail for improper use of credit cards. On 7 August 2014, she was arrested for the same crimes. On 2 April 2015 she was among the prisoners who had their feet washed by Pope Francis in the prison of Rebibbia. On Christmas 2017, she was released after serving three years and four months in jail.

== Filmography ==
- "Ivo il Tardivo" dir. A. Benvenuti
- "Chiavi in mano" dir. M. Laurenti
- "Finalmente soli" dir. U. Marino
- "Figli di Annibale" dir. F. Ferrario
- "Fughe da Fermo" dir. E. Nesi
- "Ridere fino a volare" dir. A. Antonacci e F. Bianchini, co-protagonist
