= Five Stormy Days =

1997 film

- Directed by: Francesco Calogero
- Written by: Francesco Calogero; Giovanni Veronesi; Sandro Veronesi
- Produced by: Galliano Juso
- Starring: Roberto De Francesco; Chiara Caselli
- Cinematography: Giulio Petromarchi
- Edited by: Davide Azzigana
- Music by: Mario Tronco
- Release date: 1997
- Country: Italy
- Language: Italian

Five Stormy Days (Italian: Cinque giorni di tempesta) is a 1997 Italian comedy-drama film co-written and directed by Francesco Calogero. It premiered at the 54th edition of the Venice International Film Festival.

== Cast ==
- Roberto De Francesco as Giovanni
- Chiara Caselli as Loredana
- Amanda Sandrelli as Antonella
- Gigio Alberti as Dario
- Rocco Papaleo as Michele
- Massimo Ceccherini as Renato
- Massimo Reale as Sergio
- Renato Carpentieri as Vince
- Umberto Orsini as himself
- Karin Proia as Fiorianna
- Angiola Baggi as Barbara
- Tonino De Bernardi

== Release ==
The film premiered at the 54th Venice International Film Festival, in the Midday sidebar.

== Reception ==
Variety's critic David Rooney praised the film and wrote: "While it declines to build much on the script's solid comedic foundations, and perhaps could have used more punch, this amusing reflection on life, love and friendship quietly satisfies with its lightness of touch, its bittersweet observations and affectionately drawn characters." Paolo Mereghetti described the film as "marked by a poetics of small coincidences and by surreal touches but also by discrepancies and ingenuity, [...] yet unusual and worthy of attention".
