= Federico Marchetti =

Italian footballer (born 1983)

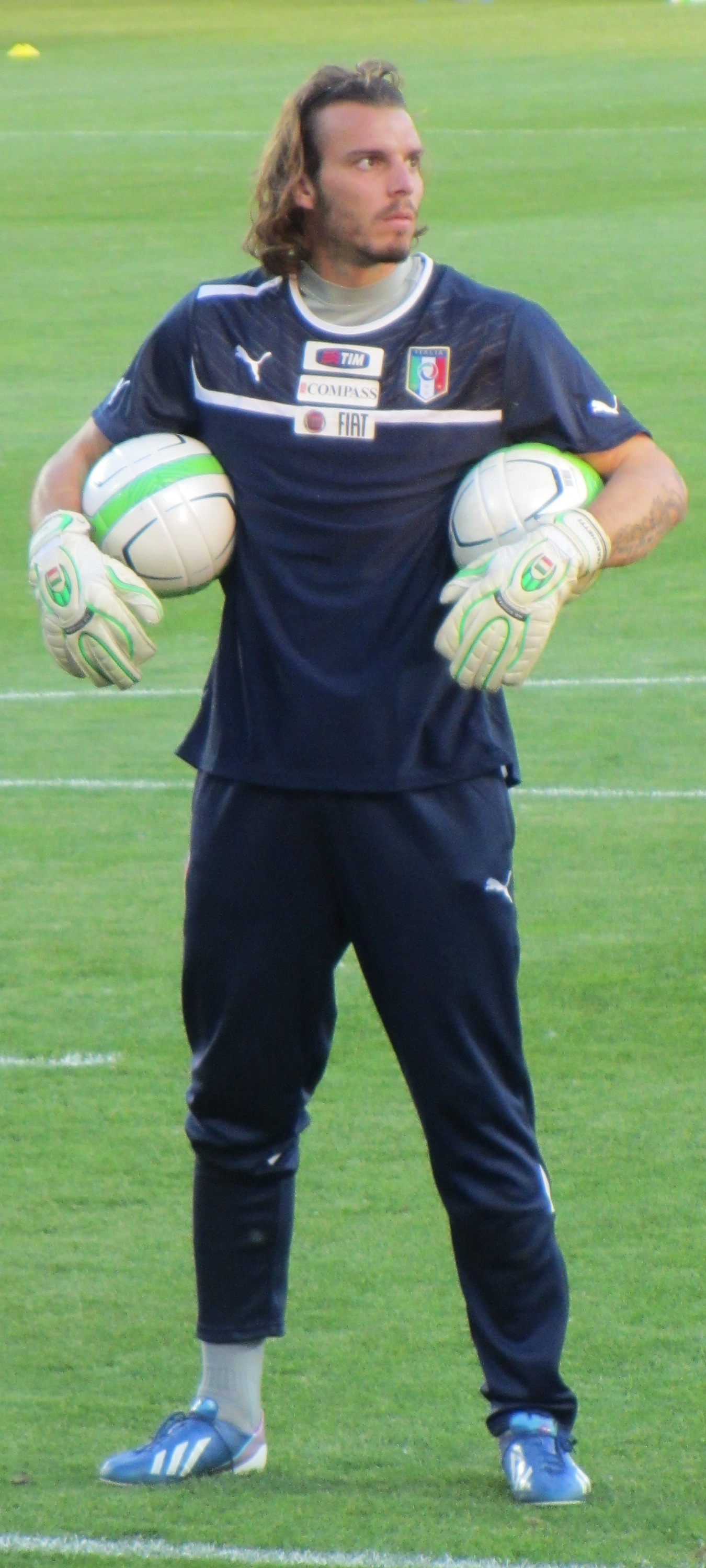
- Marchetti with Italy in 2013

Personal information
- Full name: Federico Marchetti
- Date of birth: 7 February 1983 (age 43)
- Place of birth: Bassano del Grappa, Italy
- Height: 1.90 m (6 ft 3 in)
- Position: Goalkeeper

Youth career
- Bessica
- Torino

Senior career*
Years	Team	Apps	(Gls)
2002–2005	Torino	1	(0)
2002–2003	→ Pro Vercelli (loan)	34	(0)
2003–2004	→ Crotone (loan)	0	(0)
2004	→ Treviso (loan)	0	(0)
2004–2005	→ Pro Vercelli (loan)	14	(0)
2005–2006	Biellese	28	(0)
2006–2008	AlbinoLeffe	45	(0)
2008–2011	Cagliari	68	(0)
2011–2018	Lazio	161	(0)
2018–2022	Genoa	8	(0)
2023	Spezia	1	(0)
2023–2024	Ħamrun Spartans	14	(0)
2024–2025	Marsaxlokk	2	(0)

International career^{‡}
2009–2013	Italy	11	(0)
Medal record
Men's Football
Representing Italy
FIFA Confederations Cup
Third place	2013 Brazil
- * Club domestic league appearances and goals as of 16 June 2025 ‡ National team caps and goals as of 15 October 2013

Federico Marchetti (Italian pronunciation: [fedeˈriːko marˈketti]; born 7 February 1983) is an Italian former professional footballer who played as a goalkeeper.

Marchetti began his professional club career with Torino in 2002. He moved to Pro Vercelli, Crotone on loan, before signing permanently for Treviso. In 2005, Marchetti spent one season with Biellese and for AlbinoLeffe as well as Cagliari, before moving to Lazio in 2011, where he won the Coppa Italia in 2013. At international level, Marchetti has represented Italy at the 2010 FIFA World Cup, at the 2013 FIFA Confederations Cup (winning a bronze medal), and at UEFA Euro 2016.

== Club career ==
=== Early career ===
A Torino youth system trainee, Marchetti made his professional debut on loan to Pro Vercelli, moving on loan to numerous other Serie C1 and Serie C2 teams in the following years.. He spent the 2003–04 season as second choice goalkeeper for Crotone and Treviso, only to lack any appearance with said teams. Marchetti started the 2004–05 season as third-choice goalkeeper at Torino, making only one appearance in his time with the granata as a substitute. In January 2005, after Torino signed another goalkeeper, Gianluca Berti, he subsequently moved to Pro Vercelli on loan the remainder of the season.

=== AlbinoLeffe ===
In mid-2005, Torino – which originally promoted to Serie A – went bankrupt and a new team restarted in Serie B as a successor, with all former Torino players being allowed to leave for free. He was signed by AlbinoLeffe and left for Biellese in co-ownership deal. In June 2006, Marchetti was bought back by Serie B club AlbinoLeffe, initially as reserve to Paolo Acerbis. In his first season with the celeste, he made 13 appearances, being successively promoted as first choice goalkeeper the following season.

During the 2007–08 season, his performances proved to be instrumental in AlbinoLeffe's historic first qualification to the promotion playoffs, where his club narrowly missed promotion to Lecce. He subsequently won the Serie B best goalkeeper award, thus raising significant interest from top-flight teams.

=== Cagliari ===
In July 2008, Cagliari agreed a loan bid with AlbinoLeffe for Marchetti, with the former club an option to buy 50% of players' rights to an agreed price. In his first season in Serie A, Marchetti confirmed his performances, gaining a place in the starting line-up. His performances were also praised by several football pundits and defined by Gianluigi Buffon as his favourite young Italian goalkeeper. On 1 February 2010, Cagliari bought the remaining rights from AlbinoLeffe.

However, he was frozen out by the club in the 2010–11 season, as his transfer request denied. He became the third keeper, behind Michael Agazzi and Ivan Pelizzoli. He was unfrozen on 3 April 2011, winning Genoa as unused bench.

=== Lazio ===
Following the departure of their Uruguay international Fernando Muslera at the end of the 2010–11 season, Marchetti joined Lazio. President Claudio Lotito activated Marchetti's €5.2 million release clause. Marchetti arrived in Rome on 5 July to undertake a medical and sign a five-year contract. He described his move to Lazio as "the end of a nightmare". Marchetti played a terrific season for Lazio and his presence and command over the defence together with his numerous saves helped Lazio achieve two consecutive Europa League qualifications with 5th and 4th-place finishes in the 2010–11 and 2011–12 Serie A campaigns respectively.

Federico Marchetti's continued period of good form during the 2012–13 season saw become one of the club's protagonists; on 26 May 2013, he won the Coppa Italia with Lazio, keeping a clean sheet in a historic 1–0 Rome derby final victory against cross-city rivals Roma. His performances led him to be called up once again to the Italy national team.

=== Later career ===
Marchetti was acquired by Genoa on 2 July 2018 on a free transfer after his contract with Lazio expired. On 21 January 2023, signed a six-month contract for Spezia until the end of the season.

On 4 July 2023, Marchetti signed a one-year contract with Maltese Premier League club Ħamrun Spartans. He made his debut in the first qualifying round of the UEFA Champions League during the controversial match against Maccabi Haifa. Marchetti debuted in the Maltese Premier League during Ħamrun Spartans' match against Balzan FC. He also made three appearances in the Maltese FA Trophy and contributed to Ħamrun's victory against Birkirkara FC in the Maltese Super Cup final. Marchetti also played in the decisive match against Floriana FC, which ended in a 5–0 victory for Ħamrun Spartans, leading the club to be crowned as champions. In December 2024, he signed a six-month contract with another Maltese club Marsaxlokk F.C., a club from the Maltese Premier League

In 2025, Marchetti retired from professional football at the age of 42 and joined the Radio TV Serie A team as a pundit.

== International career ==
In May 2009, following his impressive performances with Cagliari, Marchetti received his first call-up to Italy national team for Marcello Lippi for a friendly match against Northern Ireland. He debuted as a starter in said match and played the whole match whilst keeping a clean sheet, ending in a 3–0 victory for the Italians.

Marchetti made his competitive debut at the 2010 FIFA World Cup, replacing the injured starter Gianluigi Buffon at half-time during Italy's opening Group F clash with Paraguay, which ended in a 1–1 draw. Marchetti kept a clean sheet, as Italy were already 1–0 down at the time of his introduction. In Marchetti's next two matches, he allowed four goals from five shots on goal, as Italy suffered a 1–1 draw against New Zealand, and a 3–2 defeat to Slovakia, and were ultimately eliminated from the tournament in the first round, failing to win a match, and finishing last in their group with only two points.

Marchetti played only one game for the Italy national team under new coach Cesare Prandelli between 2010 and 2012. However, in 2013, was recalled by Prandelli to represent Italy in a friendly match against Netherlands. Marchetti was also selected for Prandelli's 23-man Italy squad for the 2013 FIFA Confederations Cup, as a back-up behind Buffon and Salvatore Sirigu; the Confederations Cup 2013 was Marchetti's second major international tournament with Italy, after previously featuring in the 2010 World Cup, and the Italians went on to earn a third-place finish. On 14 August 2013, in honour of Pope Francis, Marchetti was brought on for the second half of an international friendly match between Italy and Argentina, played in Rome.

On 31 May 2016, Marchetti was included in Antonio Conte's 23-man Italy squad for UEFA Euro 2016, but remained as the only member of the squad not to play in the tournament.

== Style of play ==
A strong, agile and reliable shot-stopper, Marchetti is considered to be one of the best Italian goalkeepers of his generation; due to his promising performances in his youth, he was considered a possible heir to Gianluigi Buffon as Italy's starting goalkeeper, who himself praised the youngster. He is known in particular for his composure, concentration, and his explosive reactions in goal, as well as his speed and bravery when rushing off his line. In his youth, he played as a forward before switching to the role of goalkeeper. Due to his long hair, he earned the nickname Tarzan from the Lazio fans.

== Personal life ==
Marchetti is married to actress Lorena Cacciatore. The couple welcomed their child on 26 September 2021.

== Career statistics ==
=== Club ===
As of match played 10 March 2024

Appearances and goals by club, season and competition
Club	Season	League			Coppa Italia		Europe		Maltese FA Trophy		Other		Total	
Club	Season	Division	Apps	Goals	Apps	Goals	Apps	Goals	Apps	Goals	Apps	Goals	Apps	Goals
Pro Vercelli	2002–03	Serie C2	34	0	—		—				2 (Note: Appearances in Serie C2 relegation play-offs)	0	36	0
Pro Vercelli	2004–05	Serie C2	14	0	—		—				—		14	0
Pro Vercelli	Total		48	0	—		—				2	0	50	0
Torino	2004–05	Serie B	1	0	0	0	—				—		1	0
Biellese	2005–06	Serie C2	28	0	—		—				2	0	30	0
AlbinoLeffe	2006–07	Serie B	13	0	0	0	—				—		13	0
AlbinoLeffe	2007–08	Serie B	32	0	1	0	—				4 (Note: Appearances in Serie B promotion play-offs)	0	37	0
AlbinoLeffe	Total		45	0	1	0	—				4	0	50	0
Cagliari	2008–09	Serie A	35	0	1	0	—				—		36	0
Cagliari	2009–10	Serie A	33	0	1	0	—				—		34	0
Cagliari	2010–11	Serie A	0	0	0	0	—				—		0	0
Cagliari	Total		68	0	2	0	—				—		70	0
Lazio	2011–12	Serie A	31	0	1	0	7 (Note: Appearances in UEFA Europa League)	0			—		39	0
Lazio	2012–13	Serie A	33	0	3	0	10	0			—		46	0
Lazio	2013–14	Serie A	21	0	1	0	4	0			—		26	0
Lazio	2014–15	Serie A	30	0	0	0	—				—		30	0
Lazio	2015–16	Serie A	29	0	0	0	5	0			1 (Note: Appearance in Supercoppa Italiana)	0	35	0
Lazio	2016–17	Serie A	17	0	1	0	0	0			—		18	0
Lazio	2017–18	Serie A	0	0	0	0	0	0			0	0	0	0
Lazio	Total		161	0	6	0	26	0			1	0	194	0
Genoa	2018–19	Serie A	4	0	2	0	—				—		6	0
Genoa	2019–20	Serie A	0	0	0	0	—				—		0	0
Genoa	2020–21	Serie A	4	0	2	0	—				—		6	0
Genoa	2021–22	Serie A	0	0	1	0	—				—		1	0
Genoa	Total		8	0	5	0	0	0			0	0	13	0
Spezia	2022–23	Serie A	1	0	0	0	—				0	0	1	0
Ħamrun Spartans	2023–24	Maltese Premier League	4	0	0	0	6 (Note: Two appearances in UEFA Champions League, four appearances in UEFA Europa Conference League)	0	3	0	1 (Note: Appearance in Maltese Super Cup)	0	15	0
Career total			364	0	14	0	32	0	3		8	0	424	0

=== International ===
Appearances and goals by national team and year
National team	Year	Apps	Goals
Italy	2009	3	0
Italy	2010	5	0
Italy	2011	—	
Italy	2012	—	
Italy	2013	3	0
Total		11	0

== Honours ==
Lazio

- Coppa Italia: 2012–13

Ħamrun Spartans

- Maltese Super Cup: 2023
- BOV Premier League: 2024
