= Melevisione =

Italian children's television program

- Genre: Children's television
- Created by: Mussi Bollini; Bruno Tognolini; Mela Cecchi
- Written by: Mela Cecchi; Bruno Tognolini; Janna Carioli; Luisa Mattia; Lorenza Cingoli; Martina Forti; Lucia Franchitti; Venceslao Cembalo; Armando Traverso
- Directed by: Pierluigi Pantini; Roberto Valentini; Enza Carpignano; Alfredo Franco; Rossella De Bonis; Paolo Severini
- Starring: Danilo Bertazzi (1999–2004); Lorenzo Branchetti (2004–2015)
- Composers: Aldo Valente; Paolo Serazzi; Livio Brescia
- Country of origin: Italy
- Original language: Italian
- No. of seasons: 17
- No. of episodes: 2,045

Production
- Executive producer: Danilo Leonardi
- Producers: Cristina Cuzzupoli; Donatella Meazza; Donatella Rorro
- Cinematography: Valter Venturelli

Original release
- Network: Rai Tre; Rai Yoyo
- Release: 18 January 1999 – 2 May 2015

Melevisione (Italian pronunciation: [meleviˈzjoːne]; portmanteau from mele, "apples", and televisione, "television") is an Italian children's television program that aired in the early afternoon between 1999 and 2015, mainly on Rai Tre with the latter seasons broadcast on Rai Yoyo. It focuses on the adventures of fairy tale characters: elves, princes, witches etc. The main character was Tonio Cartonio (played by Danilo Bertazzi) until 2004, then followed by Milo Cotogno (Lorenzo Branchetti).

The episode entitled "Chi ha paura del lupo cattivo?" was also dubbed in English with the title "Who's Afraid of the Big Bad Wolf?".
