= Maria Amelia Monti =

Italian actress (born 1962)

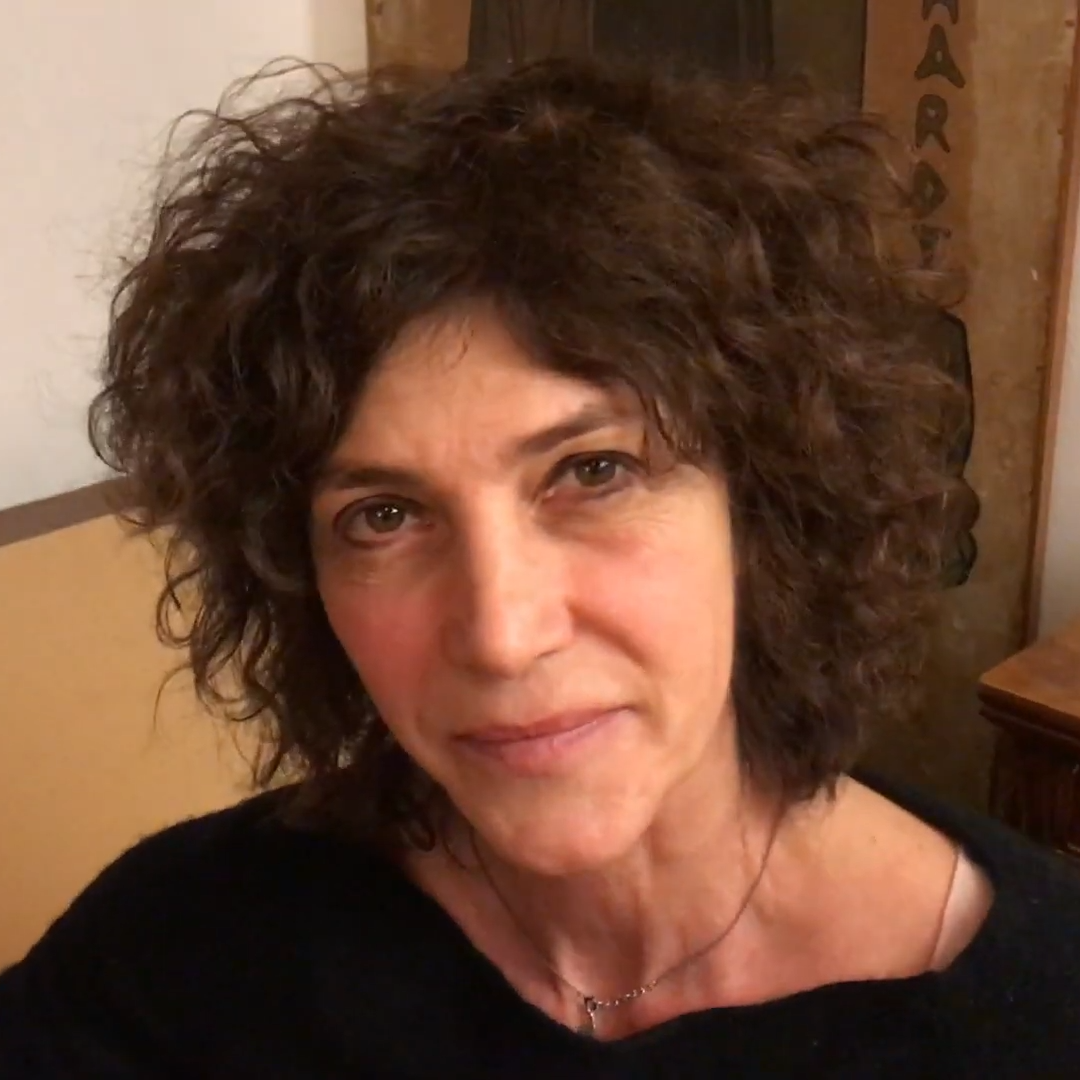
- Monti in 2018
- Born: 30 June 1962 (age 64); Milan, Italy
- Occupation: Actress

Maria Amelia Monti (born 30 June 1962) is an Italian actress and comedian.

== Life and career ==
Born in Milan, Monti is the daughter of the architect Anna Maria Bertarini and the granddaughter of painter Cesare Monti. After being rejected from the Accademia Nazionale di Arte Drammatica Silvio D'Amico and from the drama school of the Piccolo Teatro, she graduated from the Accademia dei Filodrammatici. She made her professional debut on stage in Tony Cucchiara's Stasera Musical.

Starting from 1982, Monti appeared on television as a comedian in several variety shows, notably Drive In and La TV delle ragazze. She is best known for her leading roles in television series such as the medical drama Amico mio, the comedy series Dio vede e provvede and the sitcom Finalmente soli. Monti is also active in films, mostly cast in humorous character roles.

=== Personal life ===
Monti is married and has three sons, including one adopted from Ethiopia. She is a Buddhist.

== Filmography ==
=== Film ===
Year	Title	Role(s)	Notes
1987	Il mistero del panino assassino	Wanda	
1994	Love Burns	Mercedes Woman	Cameo appearance
1994	Italia Village	Daniela	
1994	Miracolo italiano	Lucia Baggioni	
1994	The True Life of Antonio H.	Herself (fictional version)	
1996	Stella's Favor	Roberta	
1999	Asini	Rita	
2004	13 at a Table	Matilde	
2005	L'isola degli smemorati	Maria (voice)	Short film
2016	Come saltano i pesci	Mariella	
2019	Se mi vuoi bene	Giulia	
2021	Carla	Santina Fracci	
2025	Where Storks Dare	Doula	
2025	Siblings	Piera	
2026	Election Day	Doctor	
2026	Il malloppo	Lorena	

=== Television ===
Year	Title	Role(s)	Notes
1987	Italian Detectives	Luisa Gismondi	Episode: "Il diabolico crimine della vipera umana"
1989	Io Jane, tu Tarzan	Kelly the Anthropologist	Episode: "Episode 1"
1993–1998	Amico mio	Clara	Main role; 12 episodes
1996–1998	Dio vede e provvede	Sister Teresa	Main role; 19 episodes
1999–2004	Finalmente soli	Alice Fumagalli	Co-lead role; 85 episodes
2004	Amiche	Rita	Main role; 4 episodes
2007	7 vite	Brigitte	2 episodes
2007	Finalmente Natale	Alice Fumagalli	Television film
2008	Finalmente a casa	Alice Fumagalli	Television film
2009	Finalmente una favola	Alice Fumagalli	Television film
2011	L'amore non basta (quasi mai)	Luana Mariani	Main role; 5 episodes
2011	Baciati dall'amore	Rosa Dell'Acqua	Main role; 6 episodes
2011–2012	Distretto di Polizia	Chief Anita Cherubini	Main role (season 11); 26 episodes
2012	Colorado: 'Sto classico	Athena	Episode: "Odissea"
2021–2022	An Astrological Guide for Broken Hearts	Ada Bassi	Recurring role; 5 episodes
