= Piero Chiambretti =

Italian television presenter

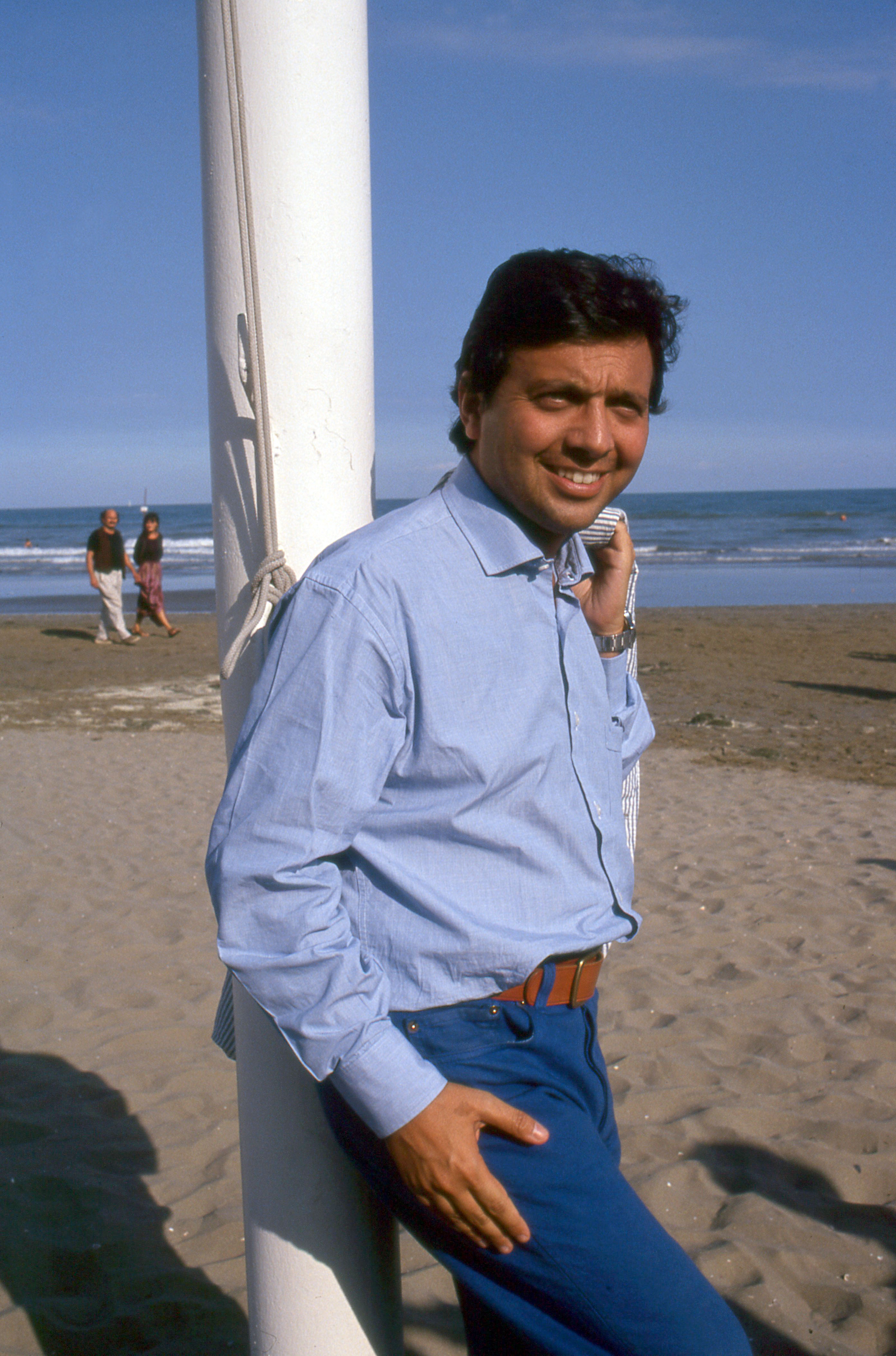
- Chiambretti in 1990
- Born: 30 May 1956 (age 70); Aosta, Aosta Valley, Italy
- Occupation: Television presenter
- Years active: 1977–present

Piero Chiambretti (born 30 May 1956) is an Italian television presenter.

== Biography ==
Born on 30 May 1956 in Aosta to Felicita Chiambretti, an 18-year-old single mother, he grew up in Turin. He later moved to Bologna, where he studied Arts, Music and Entertainment. During his studies, Chiambretti also presented some cabaret shows and worked as a tourist resort entertainer.

His first TV appearance was in 1977 when he co-presented the show Non siamo gazzose with Erik Colombardo, aired by Grp, a local TV channel broadcast in Piedmont only. In 1982, he started working in RAI, appearing in some shows for kids. Starting from 1988, he was part of the cast of the TV show Va Pensiero, broadcast by Rai 3. This experience allowed him to receive a Telegatto for Revelation of the Year.

In 1997, Chiambretti was chosen as one of the presenters of the 47th Sanremo Music Festival, along with Mike Bongiorno and Valeria Marini. During the following year, he presented the DopoFestival, a show aired immediately after each night of the Sanremo Music Festival, featuring comments about the televised song contest. In 2002, he created a new TV show, Chiambretti c'è, together with Gianni Boncompagni. After being excluded from RAI, Chiambretti, assisted by the showgirl Sylvie Lubamba, presented the show Markette – tutto fa brodo in TV on the channel La7. After returning to the DopoFestival in 2007, he presented the Sanremo Music Festival once again in 2008, with Pippo Baudo.

Chiambretti later started to work for Italian television company Mediaset, presenting shows including Chiambretti Night, Chiambretti Supermarket and Striscia la Notizia.

On 17 March 2020 Chiambretti tested positive for coronavirus.
