= L'avvocato Porta =

- Genre: Legal drama; Mystery
- Directed by: Franco Giraldi
- Starring: Gigi Proietti; Ornella Muti; Fiorenzo Fiorentini; Ninetto Davoli; Nicola Pistoia; Luisa De Santis; Karin Proia; Laura Di Mariano; Lea Gramsdorff; Maria Grazia Cucinotta
- Country of origin: Italy
- Original language: Italian
- No. of seasons: 2
- No. of episodes: 8

Original release
- Network: Canale 5
- Release: November 24, 1997 – January 31, 2000

L'avvocato Porta is an Italian legal drama television series directed by Franco Giraldi.

== Cast ==
- Gigi Proietti: Lawyer Antonio Porta
- Ornella Muti: Chiara
- Fiorenzo Fiorentini: Mr. Costanzo
- Ninetto Davoli: Remondino
- Nicola Pistoia: Inspector Gargiulo
- Luisa De Santis: Renata
- Karin Proia: Patrizia Sorgi
- Edoardo Leo: Vincenzo
