= Tina Lagostena Bassi =

Italian lawyer and politician (1926–2008)

Augusta Lagostena Bassi
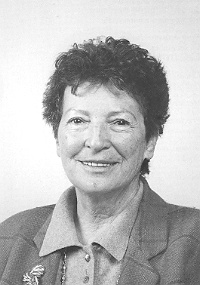
- Born: 2 March 1926; Milan, Italy
- Died: 4 March 2008 (aged 82); Rome, Italy
- Occupations: Lawyer; Politician; Writer; Showoman
- Spouse: Vitaliano Lagostena

Augusta Lagostena "Tina" Bassi (2 March 1926 – 4 March 2008) was an Italian lawyer, an Italian deputy for the Forza Italia party, a media personality and a writer.

== Professional career ==
She earned a law degree and taught as an assistant professor at Genoa University and then as professor of navigation law at Parma University. She worked in the Italian Justice Department at the Reform Office from 1973 - 1975 as a consultant and continued her career as a lawyer. She was particularly famous for her work on cases involving women's rights. In 1983, she was the Italian delegate at the World Conference for Peace in Prague. She was also one of the founders of "Telefono Rosa" (in English "Pink Telephone"), an association that assists female victims of brutality.

== Political career ==
She was elected deputy of the Italian Chamber of Deputies in the XII republican Parliament of Italy as a member of the Forza Italia party. She was additionally President of the Italian National Committee for Equal Chance, member of the European Union Equal Opportunity Committee, member of the Justice Committee in Italian Parliament, delegate at Peking Conference for Women's Rights and assistant supervisor of the new Italian Law against sexual violence.

== Work in TV ==
In 1993, for RAI, she wrote the scenography for the television production "L'avvocato delle donne" ("The Women's Lawyer"), starring actress Mariangela Melato. She then wrote of book of the same title. From 1998 until her death, she was an arbitration judge on the TV show "Forum" on Mediaset Rete 4. She also hosted a Talk show "Tina-mite", on the Italian TV network "Odeon". In 2006, she was named Honorary Provost of the Popular University of Milan.

== Death ==
She died in Rome in a private hospital after a long illness, two days following her 82nd birthday.
