= Nadia Toffa =

Italian journalist (1979–2019)

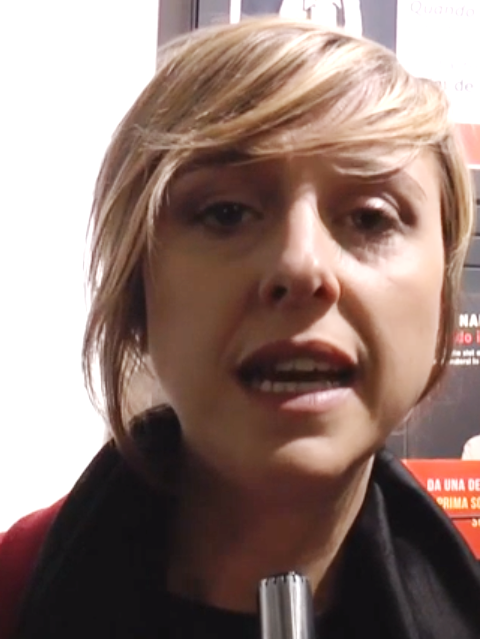
- Toffa in 2014
- Born: 10 June 1979; Brescia, Italy
- Died: 13 August 2019 (aged 40); Brescia, Italy
- Education: University of Florence
- Occupations: Journalist; television presenter
- Known for: Le Iene

Nadia Toffa (10 June 1979 – 13 August 2019) was an Italian journalist and television presenter for satirical current affairs programme Le Iene who gained attention in 2017 for a series of stories about the environmental impacts of alleged nuclear testing at the Gran Sasso Laboratory.

== Biography ==
=== First experiences ===
After graduating in Literature at the University of Florence, Toffa made her first television appearance at the age of 23 on the Emilia-Romagna local channel Telesanterno, while from 2005 to 2009 she worked for Retebrescia, a local channel of her hometown Brescia.

=== Le Iene ===
In 2009, at the age of 30, Toffa became a reporter for the television programme Le Iene, recording numerous reports. Among the most famous are those on alleged scams carried out by pharmacies against the national health service, on the proliferation of slot machine rooms, on illegal waste disposal in Campania at the hands of the Camorra, on the growing rate of tumours in the "triangle of death" between Naples and Caserta and on the "land of poisons" in Crotone.

On 21 November 2017 Toffa presented a report on an allegedly dangerous nuclear experiment kept hidden in the Gran Sasso Laboratory, yet this report was judged unfounded by the academic world.

She was awarded the Ischia International Journalism Award "Special Prize – Television Presenter of the Year" in 2015.

In 2017, hers was the third most searched-for personal name on Google worldwide.

In 2018, several fake news alleging her death appeared on various websites, before she denied such allegations. In the same years, she found out to be a victim of false advertising, after a fake interview and deepfake videos of her appeared online, showing the journalist 'promoting' Chocolite, an alleged weight loss beverage. These fake news alleged that she had shed 30 kg in one month by using the aforementioned product.

=== Illness and death ===
On 2 December 2017, Toffa suffered a collapse during a report in Trieste, and this led to her temporary departure from working life. On 11 February 2018, Toffa revealed that her collapse was caused by a tumour she was fighting against.

On 13 August 2019, at 07:39 at age 40, Toffa died from brain cancer in her hometown Brescia, having been hospitalised from the beginning of July following the worsening of her health.
