= Lorenzo Branchetti =

Italian actor, presenter, and entertainer

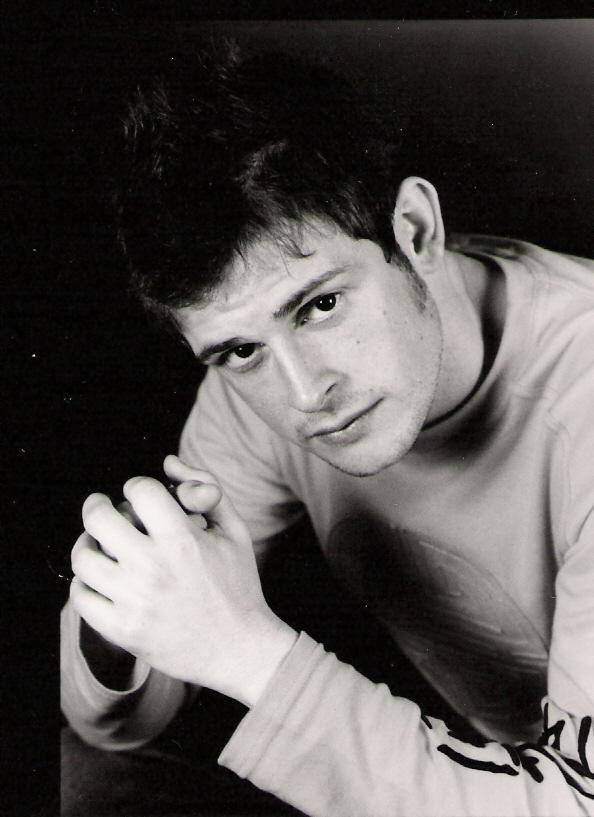
- Born: Lorenzo Branchetti; 14 January 1981 (age 45); Prato, Italy
- Occupations: Character actor; television presenter

Lorenzo Branchetti (born 14 January 1981) is an Italian character actor, presenter, and entertainer perhaps best known for his role in the television program Melevisione on Raitre (as Milo Cotogno).

== Filmography ==
=== Television ===
| Tear | Title | Role | Notes |
|---|---|---|---|
| 2002 | Valeria medico legale | Mario | Episode: "Una mamma per Valeria" |
| 2004–2015 | Melevisione | Milo Cotogno | Series regular (seasons 6–17) |
| 2010–2018 | La prova del cuoco | Co-host | Seasons 11–18 |
| 2011 | Identity | Contestant | Season 5 |
| 2013, 2018 | Zecchino d'Oro | Guest | Annual music contest |
| 2016–2018 | Natale con Yo-Yo | Presenter | Christmas specials |
| 2017 | Black Death - The Series | Lunaire | Main role |
| 2018–present | La posta di Yo-Yo | Himself/ Milo Cotogno | Seasons 8–present |

=== Films ===
| Tear | Title | Role | Notes |
|---|---|---|---|
| 2002 | Senso '45 | Soldier | Cameo appearance |
| 2003 | The Wedding Dress | Rosso | |
