= Danilo Bertazzi =

Italian actor (born 1960)

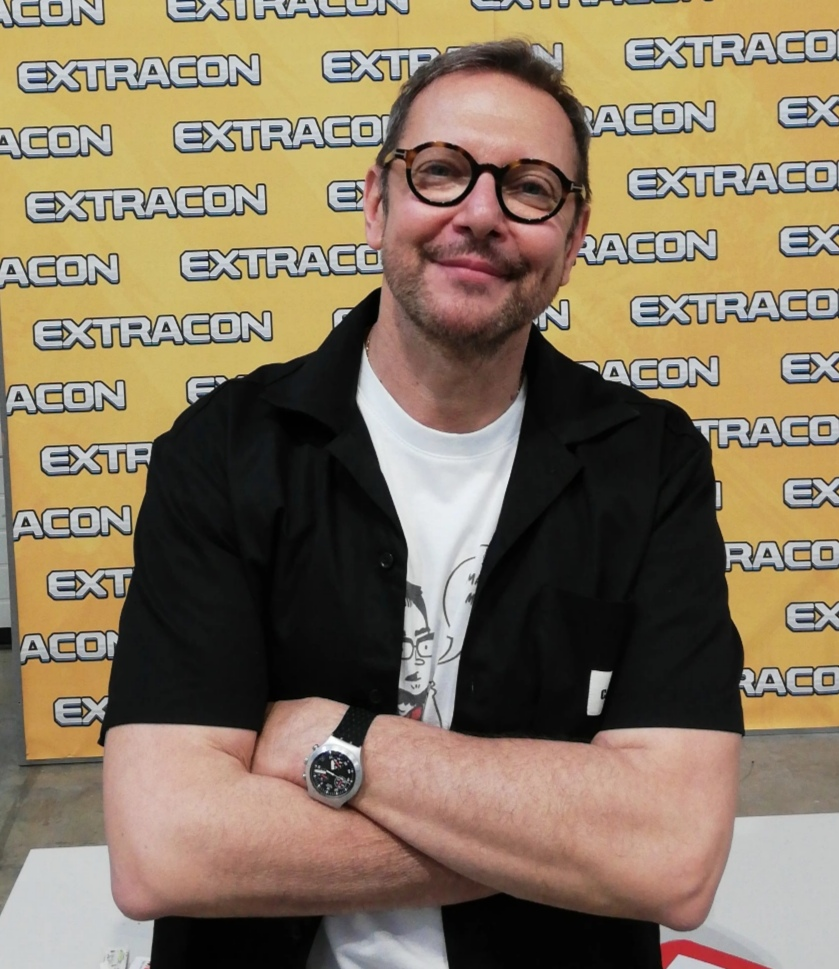
- Danilo in Pordenone on 2023
- Born: Danilo Bertazzi; 23 February 1960 (age 66); Chivasso, Piedmont, Italy
- Occupations: Voice-over artist, character actor, comedian, presenter

Danilo Bertazzi (born 23 February 1960 in Chivasso, Piedmont) is an Italian character actor, voice-over artist, presenter and entertainer perhaps best known for his role in the television programme Melevisione on Raitre (as Tonio Cartonio) from 1999 to 2004 and his roles in Trebisonda (as Danilo) from 2006.

== Biography ==
He graduated from the Centro di Formazione Teatrale in Turin, followed by advanced seminars, and worked in both theater and television with selected directors (Massimo Scaglione, Krzysztof Zanussi, Petruzzi, Gervasio), playing a variety of roles. With the Teatro Stabile di Torino, he worked on Il piccolo principe and Cuore a gas, with the Teatro delle Dieci on La cantatrice calva, Rassegna di monologhi,Tonight We Improvise, and also children's theater.

He has appeared in various television productions such as Versilia '66,Carolina Invernizio, Il giro del mondo in 80 giorni (a variety show on Rai 1 where he voiced Topo Gigio) and Passioni. His resume also includes several radio productions, from readings of Cesare Pavese to Racconti di mezzanotte, as well as radio dramas and dubbing. In 1990, he took part in the SIP commercial for the 187 service. In 1995, he appeared in the film Cuore cattivo and in 1999 he played the role of a Polizia Penitenziaria officer in the film Ormai è fatta!, alongside Stefano Accorsi.

He worked for just over six years on the program Melevisione, playing Tonio Cartonio, the elf who makes drinks, a role that brought him great fame, becoming an icon for children in the 1990s. In 2004, he left the program due to health problems, some misunderstandings with a new director, and because the character of Tonio Cartonio “was taking over.” From December 2005, he worked in theater with the musical group Nuove Tribù Zulu in Fantastica, a show inspired by the fairy tales of Gianni Rodari, while in February 2006, he appeared with Oreste Castagna in Racconti di Pace, a show presented for the Trento Carnival. From October 9, 2006, until the summer of 2008, he returned to Rai 3 with the variety show Trebisonda, where he played the character Danilo.

Since November 2010, he has hosted the program Slurp on the Arturo channel alongside Michela Coppa, a cooking show aimed at young people. Since the summer of 2011, he has appeared in the soap opera CentoVetrine in the role of Dr. Giorgio Correntini, and in the winter he returned to Melevisione playing the role of Chef Danilo. In the same year, he starred in the film Le stelle inquiete, directed by Emanuela Piovano, in the role of Father Perrin. Since 2012, he has been the author of the program La posta di YoYo on the Rai Yoyo channel.

Since 2020, he has been a member of the cast of the program Che succ3de?, hosted by Geppi Cucciari on Rai 3, as the “notary” in the Friday night special episode. In April 2022, he returned to television with Calzino, a new children's program available on Rai Yoyo. In March 2025, he starred in the video for Stefano Tiranti's song Mk1, taken from the album Fuck the Mono.
