= The Snack Thief =

1996 novel by Andrea Camilleri

- Italian first edition cover
- Author: Andrea Camilleri
- Original title: Il ladro di merendine
- Translator: Stephen Sartarelli
- Language: Italian/Sicilian
- Series: Inspector Salvo Montalbano, #3
- Genre: Crime, Mystery novel
- Publisher: Sellerio (ITA); Viking (US); Macmillan/Picador (UK)
- Publication date: 16 December 1996
- Publication place: Italy, Sicily
- English publication date: 2003
- Media type: Print (Hardcover, Paperback)
- Pages: 247 pp 352 pp (Eng. trans.)
- ISBN: 0-330-49291-8 (Eng. trans.)
- OCLC: 59278658
- Preceded by: The Terracotta Dog
- Followed by: The Voice of the Violin

The Snack Thief (Italian: Il ladro di merendine) is a 1996 novel by Andrea Camilleri, translated into English in 2003 by Stephen Sartarelli.

It is the third novel of the internationally popular Inspector Montalbano series.

== Plot summary ==
During a night off the coast of Vigàta a fishing boat from Mazara del Vallo, called "Santopadre", is intercepted and machine-gunned, apparently in international waters, by a Tunisian patrol boat. The exploded shots kill a Tunisian sailor who was on board the Italian boat. On the same day the former merchant Aurelio Lapecora is stabbed in a lift and Karima Moussa, a beautiful Tunisian cleaning lady, suddenly disappears.

Montalbano discovers that the girl also worked in the office of the murdered merchant whose lover she was, and that she had a son, François, who also disappeared with her. Thanks to the help of the elderly Aisha, an acquaintance of Karima, Montalbano also finds a savings account owned by the girl with deposited five hundred million lire, a sum too high for a young immigrant who should have had only what she received from her humble work.

While returning to the police station from the visit to the house of Karima, Montalbano sees in front of a primary school a small group of mothers who complain with a policeman of some thefts of snacks, which accuse a small foreigner child. Montalbano realizes that he's François: lurking with his girlfriend Livia and his men, he manages to take the little Tunisian who had taken refuge in an abandoned house. Livia, in reassuring the child brought home by Montalbano to protect him, will feel the birth of her maternal instinct and the desire to form a more intense union with Salvo, adopting the child. The commissioner will join the project of Livia but in the meantime the investigations are complicated by the secret services and the slimy figure of Colonel Lohengrin Pera.

In the story there are many references to Montalbano's relationship with his father, who lives far from Vigata and remains a widower of his second wife. He collects newspaper articles that write about his son's investigative successes and when the commissioner was wounded, he was near him by calling and went to visit him in hospital. Sometimes a box of his good wine arrives at the police station. During the investigation, Montalbano receives a letter from a partner of his father's winery informing him that he has long been seriously ill with a tumor and that, although aware of his imminent death, he did not want to let his son know anything about spare him the agony of his suffering. Montalbano will arrive in the hospital where his father is hospitalized when he is dead and will bitterly reproach himself for his selfishness because even if he had intuited the malaise he has unconsciously ignored it.

== Adaptation ==
It was first adapted for television by RAI with Luca Zingaretti in the TV series Inspector Montalbano. The episode was the first of the series and aired on 6 May 1999.
