= Dio vede e provvede =

Italian television series

- Genre: Comedy
- Created by: Carlotta Ercolino
- Starring: Angela Finocchiaro; Maria Amelia Monti; Athina Cenci; Nathalie Guetta; Billie Zöckler; Cecilia Dazzi; Evelina Gori; Giovanna Rotellini; Nadia Rinaldi; Nicoletta Boris
- Country of origin: Italy
- No. of seasons: 2
- No. of episodes: 19

Original release
- Network: Italia 1
- Release: October 29, 1996 – December 30, 1998

Dio vede e provvede is an Italian comedy television series.

== Cast ==
- Angela Finocchiaro: Suor Amelia
- Maria Amelia Monti: Suor Teresa
- Athina Cenci: Madre Superiora
- Antonio Catania: "il Principe"
- Nathalie Guetta: Suor Letizia
- Billie Zöckler: Suor Orsola
- Cecilia Dazzi: Suor Luminosa
- Evelina Gori: Suor Gemma
- Giovanna Rotellini: Suor Delfina
- Nadia Rinaldi: Suor Apollonia
- Nicoletta Boris: Suor Pia
- Dario Vergassola: Erminio
- Remo Girone: Don Caracciolo
- Zuleika Dos Santos: Suor Tikonokono
- Carlo Croccolo: Gaetano
- Luca Zingaretti: Italo

== See also ==
- List of Italian television series
