= UniNettuno University TV =

- Country: Italy

Programming
- Language: Italian
- Picture format: 4:3/16:9 (SDTV)

Ownership
- Owner: Università telematica internazionale UniNettuno

History
- Launched: 10 November 1997
- Former names: Rai Nettuno (1997–1999); RaiSat Nettuno Lezione Universitarie (1999–2003); Rai Nettuno Sat Uno (2003–2014)

Links
- Website: www.uninettuno.tv

UniNettuno University TV (formerly Rai Nettuno Sat 1) is an Italian educational television channel owned by Università telematica internazionale UniNettuno, a distance education organisation. In 2009, a second channel, Rai Nettuno Sat Due, began broadcasting (which was ceased a few years later).
