= Giorgia Rossi =

Italian journalist and television presenter (born 1987)

- Rossi in 2026
- Born: 5 June 1987 (age 39); Rome, Italy
- Occupations: Journalist; television presenter
- Years active: 2007–present
- Employers: Roma Channel; Sky Sport; Rai Sport; Mediaset (2013–2021); DAZN (2021–present)
- Television: Tiki Taka - Il calcio è il nostro gioco; Pressing Champions League; Pressing Serie A

Giorgia Rossi (born 5 June 1987) is an Italian journalist and television presenter.

== Biography ==
Rossi was born in Rome on 5 June 1987. She studied in the Liceo scientifico and then at Jurisprudence, without completing her studies. She later enrolled as a publicist in the Lazio order of journalists, and at the age of 20 began to work for the thematic channel Roma Channel. She moved first to Sky, then to Rai Sport. From October 2013, she worked for Mediaset as a correspondent for the television program Tiki-Taka. Later she worked for Studio Sport, and finally the management of the pre and post-match UEFA Champions League on Mediaset Premium and that of Domenica Premium, a program that broadcasts Serie A matches on Premium Sport every Sunday morning.

Rossi led the pre- and post-match coverage of the 2018 FIFA World Cup on Mediaset, and she was a regular guest on the Balalaika – Dalla Russia col pallone program. From 2019, she led "Pressing Champions League" on Italia 1, and from January 2020 she led "Pressing Serie A" on Rete 4. In June 2021, she left Mediaset joining DAZN.
