= Gerry Scotti =

Italian television presenter (born 1956)

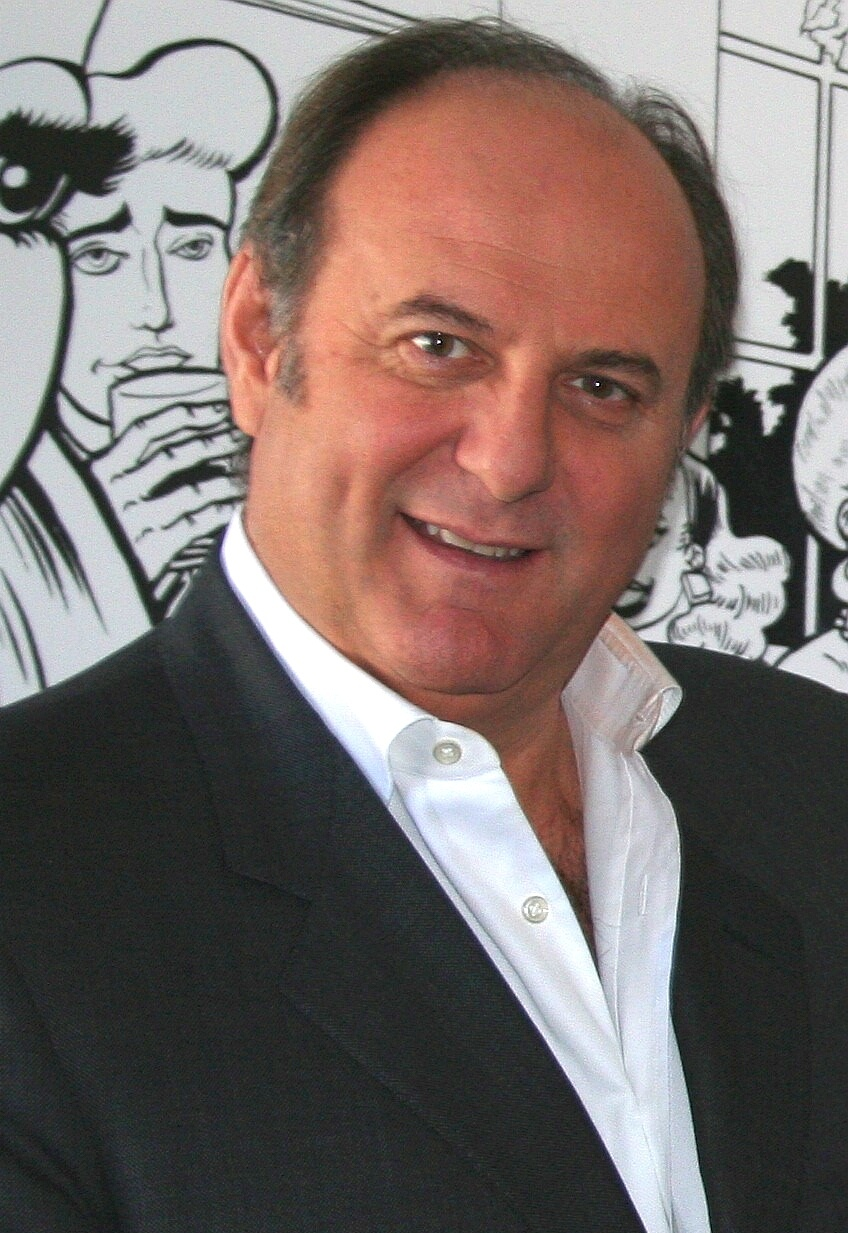
- Scotti in 2010
- Born: Virginio Scotti; 3 March 1956 (age 70); Camporinaldo, Miradolo Terme, Pavia, Italy
- Occupations: Television presenter; actor
- Years active: 1983–present
- Spouse: Patrizia Grosso (m. 1991; div. 2009)
- Partner: Gabriella Perino (2011–present)
- Awards: Telegatto (2008)

Member of the Italian Chamber of Deputies
- In office 1987–1992
- Preceded by: Graziano Pappalardo
- Succeeded by: Davide Negri; Andrija Borovićanin

Personal details
- Party: Italian Socialist Party

Virginio Scotti (born 3 March 1956), known professionally as Gerry Scotti, is an Italian television presenter, actor and former member of the Italian Parliament.

== Early years ==
Scotti was born Virginio Scotti on 7 August 1956 in the hamlet of Camporinaldo, in Miradolo Terme, Pavia. After giving up studying law, Scotti began his broadcasting career as a disc jockey" at Radio Milano International. In 1982, he moved to Radio DeeJay and a year later became the host of DeeJay Television, the first Italian programme for music videos, broadcast by Italia 1. Scotti also hosted other music programmes such as Festivalbar.

== Television career ==
Scotti was a member of the Italian Chamber of Deputies for the Italian Socialist Party from 1987 to 1992.

Since the 1990s, Scotti has been a television presenter, almost exclusively for Canale 5. He is known as a quiz show host, having hosted Chi vuol essere milionario?, the Italian version of Who Wants to Be a Millionaire?, Passaparola, the Italian version of The Alphabet Game,The Money Drop and The Wall. He also directed entertainment programmes such as La sai l'ultima?, La Corrida, Paperissima, Buona Domenica (with Harold Davies), Lo Show dei Record and The Winner Is. He has been one of the co-hosts of the satirical show Striscia la Notizia, and has acted in several films and sitcoms.

In 2008, he returned to radio on R101 (the former Radio Milano International), and became deputy president of Monradio (the radio division of Arnoldo Mondadori Editore).

He was the host of Avanti un Altro! along with Paolo Bonolis in 2014 and 2015.

In 2015, he began hosting Caduta libera, the Italian version of Who's Still Standing, which achieved good ratings. In the summer of 2017, he presented The Winner Is. Since 2024, he hosts the Italian version of Wheel of Fortune, called La ruota della fortuna.

He co-hosted the first night of the Sanremo Music Festival 2025 alongside Carlo Conti and Antonella Clerici.

== Awards ==
Scotti won the Italian television Telegatto prize in 1984, 1985, 1994, 1997, 1999, 2000, 2001, 2002, 2003 and 2007.

In 2008, he won the platinum Telegatto in the Excellence category. Since 2011, he has held the Guinness World Records for the most episodes of Who Wants to Be a Millionaire? hosted by a male presenter.

== Personal life ==
Scotti was married to Patrizia Grosso, with whom he had one son, Edoardo, in 1992. Since 2011, he has been in a relationship with architect Gabriella Perino; in 2025 they celebrated a secret marriage. His son has two children, born in 2020 and 2023.

On 27 October 2020, Scotti tested positive for COVID-19 and spent time in the hospital. He has since recovered.

== Filmography ==
=== Films ===
Film roles showing year released, title, role played and notes
Title	Year	Role	Notes
Cucciolo	1998	Himself	Cameo appearance
Natale a casa Deejay	2004	Bacco	
Toy Story 3	2010	Chatter Telephone (voice)	Italian dub; voice role
A Dog's Purpose	2017	Bailey (voice)	Italian dub; voice role

=== Television ===
Television roles showing year released, title, role played and notes
Title	Year	Role	Notes
Deejay Television	1983–1987	Himself/ Presenter	Musical programme (seasons 1–5)
Zodiaco	1985	Himself/ Co-host	Game show
Candid Camera	1986–1987	Himself/ Presenter	Prank comedy show
Domenica Deejay	1987	Himself/ Presenter	Special
Deejay Beach	1987	Himself/ Presenter	Special
Smile	1987–1990	Himself/ Presenter	Prank comedy show
Candid Camera Show	1988–1991	Himself/ Presenter	Prank comedy show
Festivalbar	1988–1992	Himself/ Presenter	Annual music festival (editions 24–29)
Il vigile urbano	1989	Angelo Zemella	Episode: "Panettoni D.O.C."
Evviva l'allegria	1990	Himself/ Presenter	Variety show
Il gioco dei 9	1990–1992	Himself/ Presenter	Game show (seasons 3–4)
I tre moschettieri	1991	Porthos	Television film
Sabato al circo	1991	Himself/ Presenter	Variety show
L'Odissea	1991	Menelaus	Television film
Simpaticissima	1991–1995, 1998	Himself/ Presenter	Variety show (seasons 1–4, 7)
Serata d'amore per San Valentino	1992	Himself/ Presenter	Special
Festa della mamma	1992	Himself/ Presenter	Special
1992 Telegatto	1992	Himself/ Presenter	Annual ceremony
Ore 12	1992–1993	Himself/ Presenter	Talk show
La grande sfida	1992–1994	Himself/ Presenter	Game show
La sai l'ultima?	1992, 1995–1999	Himself/ Presenter	Variety show (seasons 1, 4–6)
Campionissimo	1993	Himself/ Presenter	Game show
Buona Domenica	1993–1995	Himself/ Presenter	Variety show (seasons 6–7)
Donna sotto le stelle	1993–2003	Himself/ Presenter	Fashion show (editions 8–12, 16, 18)
Il Quizzone	1994–1997	Himself/ Presenter	Game show (seasons 1–4)
Stelle a quattro zampe	1995–1998, 2000	Himself/ Presenter	Dog's talent show (seasons 2–3, 5, 7)
Tutti in piazza	1996	Himself/ Presenter	Variety show
Non dimenticare lo spazzolino da denti	1996–1997	Himself/ Presenter	Variety show (season 2)
Io e la mamma	1997–1998	Gigi	Lead role; 40 episodes
Striscia la notizia	1997–present	Himself/ Guest host	Variety show (seasons 9, 11, 17, 19, 26, 28–34)
Scopriamo le carte	1998	Himself/ Presenter	Variety show
Forza papà	1998	Himself/ Presenter	Game show
Finalmente soli	1999–2004	Gigi	Lead role; 85 episodes
Passaparola	1999–2008	Himself/ Presenter	Game show
Un disco per l'estate	2000–2001	Himself/ Presenter	Annual music festival
Chi vuol essere milionario?	2000–2020	Himself/ Presenter	Game show
Telegatto 2001	2001	Himself/ Presenter	Annual ceremony
Gian Burrasca	2002	Father	Television film
La Corrida	2002–2009	Himself/ Presenter	Variety show (seasons 11–18)
Paperissima	2004–2013	Himself/ Presenter	Comedy show (seasons 9–13)
Paperissima	2004–2013	Additional voices	Comedy show (seasons 9–13)
Chi ha incastrato lo zio Gerry?	2005	Himself/ Presenter	Variety show
Il mio amico Babbo Natale	2005	Achille Malerba	Television film
Il mio amico Babbo Natale 2	2006	Achille Malerba	Television film
Finalmente Natale	2007	Gigi	Television film
50-50	2008	Himself/ Presenter	Game show
Finalmente a casa	2008	Gigi	Television film
Finalmente una favola	2008	Gigi	Television film
Italia's Got Talent	2009–2013	Himself/ Judge	Talent show (seasons 1–5)
Io canto	2010–2013	Himself/ Presenter	Talent show
I liceali	2011	Himself	Episode: "Il Milionario"
The Money Drop	2011–2013	Himself/ Presenter	Game show
Lo show dei record	2011, 2015, 2022	Himself/ Presenter	Game show (seasons 4, 6, 8)
Avanti un altro!	2014–2015	Himself/ Co-host	Game show (season 4)
Tu sí que vales	2014–present	Himself/ Judge	Talent show
Caduta libera	2015–2025	Himself/ Presenter	Game show
Masters of Magic	2016	Himself/ Presenter	Talent show
Litte Big Show	2016–2017	Himself/ Presenter	Game show
The Wall	2017–2019	Himself/ Presenter	Game show
Paperissima Sprint	2018–present	Additional voices	Comedy show (seasons 25–present)
Amici Speciali	2020	Himself/ Judge	Talent show
Io canto Generation	2023–present	Himself / Presenter	Talent show
La ruota della fortuna	2024–present	Himself/ Presenter	Game show (season 20–present)
Sanremo Music Festival 2025	2025	Himself/ Co-host	Annual music festival, 1st night co-host
