= Due per tre =

- Genre: Sitcom
- Created by: Giorgio Vignali
- Starring: Johnny Dorelli; Loretta Goggi; Marta Forghieri; Margherita Lombardo; Alessandro Sacco; Sabrina Marciano; Rosanna Ruffini
- Composer: Augusto Martelli
- Country of origin: Italy
- No. of seasons: 3
- No. of episodes: 60

Production
- Running time: 25 min

Original release
- Network: Canale 5
- Release: March 23, 1997 – February 7, 1999

Due per tre is an Italian sitcom.

== Cast ==
- Johnny Dorelli as Giorgio Antonioli
- Loretta Goggi as Elena Antonioli
- Marta Forghieri as Martina Antonioli
- Margherita Lombardo as Niki Antonioli
- Alessandro Sacco as Leo Antonioli

== See also ==
- List of Italian television series
