= Pino Ammendola =

Italian actor (born 1951)

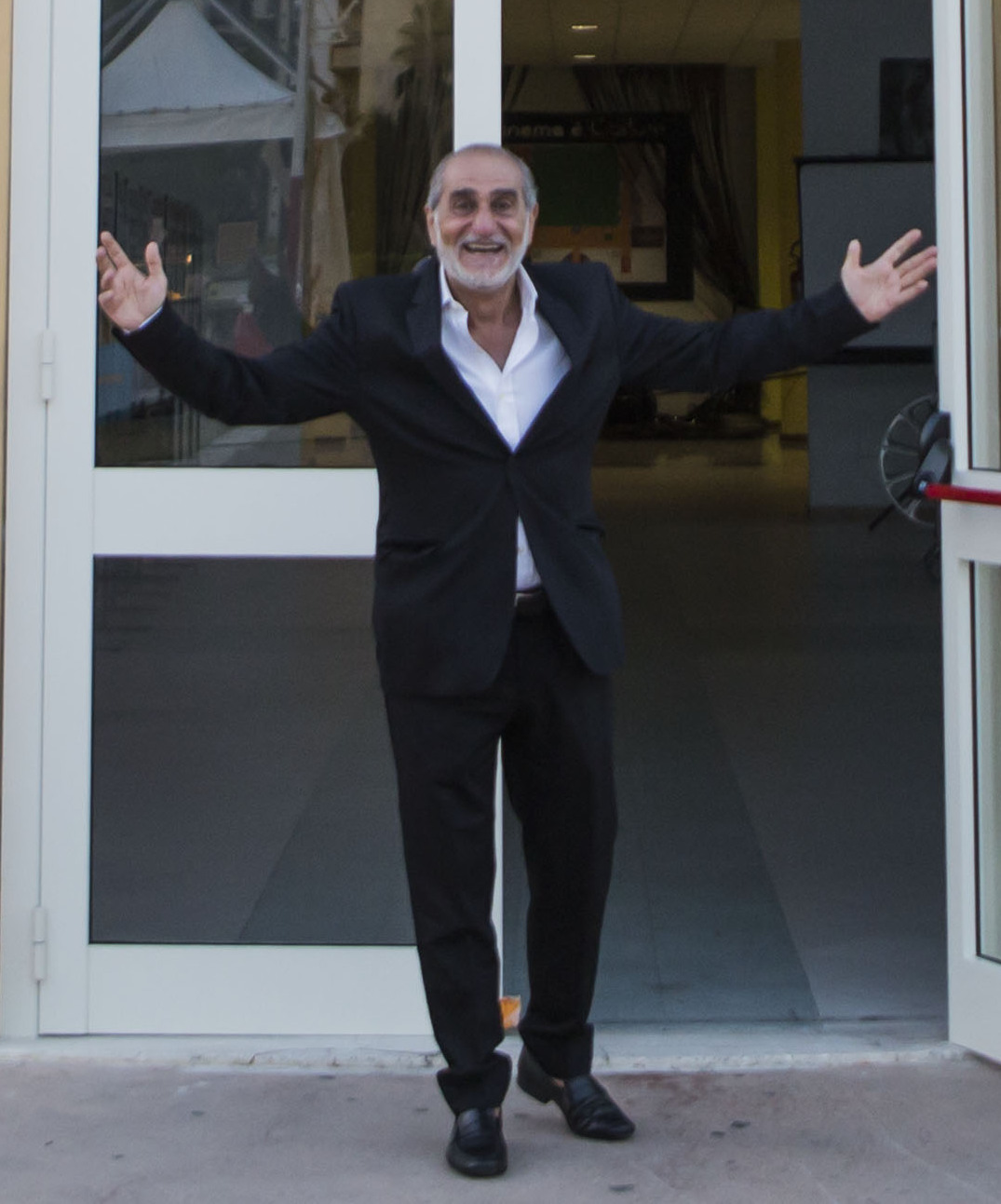
- Ammendola in 2018
- Born: Giuseppe Ammendola; 2 December 1951 (age 74); Naples, Italy
- Occupations: Actor; voice actor; film director; playwright
- Years active: 1966–present
- Height: 1.69 m (5 ft 7 in)
- Children: Claudio Ammendola

Giuseppe "Pino" Ammendola (born 2 December 1951) is an Italian actor, voice actor, film director and playwright. He has appeared in films since 1966.

== Selected filmography ==
- Operazione San Gennaro (1966)
- Caligula (1979)
- Camorra (A Story of Streets, Women and Crime) (1986)
- Piedipiatti (1991)
- Erotic Tales II (1995)
- Tequila & Bonetti (2000)
- Fade to Black (2006)
- Göta kanal 2 – Kanalkampen (2006)
- Don Matteo
- Incantesimo
