= Io e la mamma =

- Genre: Sitcom
- Created by: Riccardo Barbieri; Belinda Bellotti
- Starring: Gerry Scotti; Delia Scala; Gea Lionello; Jacopo Sarno; Enzo Garinei; Mariangela Fremura
- Country of origin: Italy
- No. of seasons: 2
- No. of episodes: 40

Production
- Running time: 25 min.

Original release
- Network: Canale 5
- Release: January 12, 1997 – January 17, 1998

Io e la mamma is an Italian sitcom.

== Cast ==
- Delia Scala: Delia Mantelli
- Gerry Scotti: Gigi Mantelli
- Gea Lionello: Elena Mantelli
- Jacopo Sarno: Paolino
- Enzo Garinei: Barozzi

== See also ==
- List of Italian television series
