= 2000 in Italian television =

This is a list of Italian television related events from 2000.

== Events ==
=== RAI ===
- 12 January: in an episode of Porta a Porta, the two "Montecastrilli lovers" (a married woman and a teen-ager, protagonists of an elopement in Germany) tell their story to Bruno Vespa, for a remuneration of 30 million liras. Despite the controversies, the show gets 5 million 266,000 viewers.
- 17 February: Roberto Zaccaria and Pier Luigi Celli are elected, respectively, president and CEO of RAI.
- 21–26 February: 50th Sanremo Festival, hosted by Fabio Fazio and won by the band Avion Travel with Sentimento; the final evening gets 18.699.000 viewers. Jovanotti performs, out of competition, the rap Cancella il debito, addressed to the Prime Minister Massimo D’Alema, and for this is charged of undue politic propaganda.
- 23 June: end of the "kids TV", the afternoon space traditionally reserved by Rai 1 to the youngest ones. The show for children Solletico is cancelled for low ratings and substituted by a program of gossip (La vita in diretta).
- 2 July.: The UEFA Euro 2000 Final match between Italy and France teams gets the highest audience of the year, with 21.330.000 viewers and an 81.1% share.
- 28 September: the TG1 broadcasts some crude images about the pedophilic traffic between Italy and Russia. Because the protests of right-wing politicians included the president of the RAI supervisory commission, Mario Landolfi, the director Gad Lerner (in charge for just three months) is forced to resign.
- 1. October: on air, Gad Lerner confirmis his resignation; he admits his error but, in turn, accuses Landolfi to have solicited by a letter the hiring of a journalist. In place of Lerner, Albino Longhi becomes, for the third time, TG1 director.
- 18 December: guest of Porta a Porta, Silvio Berlusconi exposes his program of big public works, tracking on the map of Italy the designed infrastructures. The show arouses the usual controversies for the partiality of the host Bruno Vespa to the Italian right-wing leader.

=== Mediaset ===
- 22 February: The par condicio law, ruling the political communication in TV, is approved: the televisions, public or private, must give equal space to every political subject; the political ads and the presence in the variety shows of candidates in elections are forbidden. The law, intended moreover to limit the politic partiality of the Mediaset televisions, is, for obvious reasons, harshly criticized by Silvio Berlusconi and the Pole for Freedoms.
- 14 September – The Italian version of Big Brother debuts. The show is aired, in anthological form, by Canale 5, and integrally, by the satellite platform Stream and the Internet channel Jumpy. The 19, there is the first scandal: two contenders (Pietro Taricone and Cristina Pievani), hidden behind a sofa, have sexual intercourse with cameras on. In November, another contender, Marina La Rosa, just after leaving the seclusion, poses naked on the Panorama cover.
- 12 October: a TG4 troupe films the Ramallah lynching; the gruesome images go around the world. After a letter of the RAI correspondent Riccardo Cristiano to Al-Hayat al-Jadida, that attributes the footage to an Italian concurrent, Mediaset must withdraw its troupe from Jerusalem to avoid reprisals. Cristiano is, in his turn, disowned and recalled by RAI.
- 21 December – The first season of Grande Fratello is won by Cristina Plevani; the moral winner, however, is the third classified, the culturist Pietro Taricone, who exploits the gained popularity to begin a career as actor. The last episode is seen by 18 million and a half viewers.

=== Other channels ===
- February: on the satellite platform D+, birth of the channel Nuvolari, focused on motorship.
- March: Rete A breaks the collaboration with MTV Italia and sign an agreement with the German musical channel VIVA. The 22 May MTV Italia transmigrates on TMC 2.
- April: Rupert Murdoch gets the control of the satellite platform Stream TV, ousting the Italian associates (Vittorio Cecchi Gori and Telecom Italia). In the year, Stream expands its offer, with the birth of new channels (National Geographic, Comedy Life, Fox Kids, Duel TV, Roma Channel) and broadcasts integrally Grande fratello, with great public success. However, D+ maintains the primate in the field, with one million subscribers (the double of the Stream's ones).
- June: Tele+ makes the first experimental DTTV broadcastings in Italy, limited to the cities of La Spezia, Brescia and Palermo.
- 6 August: Roberto Colanino, president of Telecom Italia, buys TMC and TMC2 by Vitttorio Cecchi Gori for one thousand billion liras and becomes the second tycoon of the private Italian television. The operation, that breaks the law about telecommunications, is sustained by the Democrats of the Left and opposed by the Pole for Freedoms and Italy of Values.
- 1 December: Retemia stops to broadcast; its frequenceis are given to the channel of home shopping H.O.T. (later, Home Shopping Europe).

== Awards ==
17. Telegatto award, for the season 1999–2000.

- Show of the year: Striscia la notizia (for Italy, awarded also as best satirical show) and Walker Texas Ranger (for abroad).
- Man and woman of the year: Luca Laurenti, Simona Ventura and Giorgio Panariello as revelation of the year.
- Best TV movie: Le ali della vita.
- Best serial: Un medico in famiglia (for Italy),
- Best soap opera: Vivere.
- Best quiz: Passaparola.
- Best variety: Buona domenica.
- Best talk show: C'è posta per te.
- Best event: Aldo, Giovanni e Giacomo show.
- Best music show: Sarabanda
- Best magazine: La macchina del tempo.
- Best sport magazine: Quelli che... il Calcio.
- Best show for children: The Simpsons.
- Special awards: Trenta ore per la vita (for the service TV), Mrs. Emma Baratto (reader of Sorrisi e Canzoni), George Clooney (for the cinema in TV), James Coburn (lifetime achievement) and the Pediatric Association for the Children with AIDS.

== Debuts ==
=== Rai ===
==== Serials ====
- Don Matteo – detective comedy, produced by Lux Vide; with Terence Hill as a country parish, amateurish detective, Nino Frassica and Flavio Insinna; 12 seasons (until now). The serial, light and imbued of good feelings, is, after Inspector Montalbano, the greatest success of the RAI fiction in the 2000s.
- Sospetti ("Suspicions") – by Luigi Perelli and Gianni Lepre, with Sebastiano Somma as the deputy attorney Luca Bartoli, Isabella Ferrari and Remo Girone; 3 seasons. The serial resumes the formula of La piovra (a solitary hero fights against the corruption of the society), transferred from Sicily to the intrigues of the North Italy upper class; the second season gets 9 million viewers for episode.
- La squadra ("The team") – procedural set in a Naples police station, with Massimo Bonetti, Renato Carpentieri and Massimo Wertmuller; 8 seasons.
- Tommy e Oscar – cartoon by Iginio Straffi, with a kid and an alien as protagonists; 2 seasons.

==== Variety ====
- Libero ("Free!") – variety focused on the prank calls, hosted by Teo Mammuccari and others; 7 seasons. The show is charged of vulgarity and sexism for the use of the soubrette Flavia Vento, forced to stay constantly under a glass desk and repeatedly humiliated.
- La prova del cuoco ("The cook's test") – cooking show, Italian version of Ready Steady Cook, hosted by Antonella Clerici and Elisa Isoardi; 20 seasons.
- Una voce per padre Pio ("A voice for Padre Pio") – benefit concert, broadcast every year from Santissima Annunziata square in Pietralcina; again on air.
- Affari di cuore ("Heart affairs") – reality show hosted by Federica Panicucci; 2 seasons. In every episode, the fidelity of an engaged couple is tried by two "tempters".
- Novecento – mix of talk show, quiz and variety about the history of the Twentieth century, hosted by Pippo Baudo; 6 seasons.
- Quiz show, l'occasione di una vita – Italian version of It's Your Chance of a Lifetime, hosted by Amadeus; 2 seasons. The show, very similar to Chi vuol essere milionario? is closed because a Mediaset's complaint for plagiarism.
- Top of the Pops, Italian version of the BBC show; 7 seasons (4 in RAI, 3 in Mediaset).
- Torno sabato ("Saturday I come back") – traveling musical show, hosted by Giorgio Paneriello; 3 seasons.

==== News and educationals ====
- Easy driver – magazine about motors, again on air.
- Linea Bianca ("White line") – magazine about life in the mountains, again on air.
- Il raggio verde ("The green ray"), talk show, and Sciuscià, magazine, both hosted by Michele Santoro. Because its leftist orientation, Sciuscià is closed after 2 seasons, at the express request of prime minister Silvio Berlusconi who, the year before, had attacked Santoro with a clamorous phone-call on air during an episode of Il raggio verde.
- Stracult – magazine about Italian cinema, focused on the popular genres and the B-movies, care of Marco Giusti; it includes also satirical sketches and parodic fictions; again on air.
- Tutti a scuola ("Everybody at the school") – ceremony for the official opening of the Italian school year, with the presence of the President of Italy and the Minister of Education.
- Ulisse, il piacere della scoperta ("Ulysses, the pleasure of discovering") – informative magazine about history, art and culture, hosted by Alberto Angela.

=== Mediaset ===
==== Miniseries ====
- Le ali della vita ("The wings of the life") by Stefano Reali; 2 seasons. The series tells, in the ways of an old-fashioned melodrama, the battle between a bigoted and scheming nun (Virna Lisi) and a free-spirited music teacher (Sabina Ferilli), fought first in a female college and then in an orphanage.
- Sei forte, maestro ("Teacher, you are great") comedy with Emilio Solfrizzi, Gaia De Laurentis and Gastone Moschin; 2 seasons. A middle-aged man with a troubled family situation finds the serenity working as primary school teacher and the love in a colleague.

==== Serials ====
- Distretto di Polizia ("Police district") – procedural set in Rome, with Isabella Ferrari, Giorgio Tirabassi and Ricky Memphis, one of the greatest success of the Mediaset fiction; 11 seasons.
- Don Luca – sitcom with Luca Laurenti in the title role (an excentric Catholic priest) and Paolo Ferrari; 2 seasons and a spin-off (Don Luca c’è).
- Valeria medico legale ("Valeria the coroner") – forensic crime drama with Claudia Koll and Giulio Base; 2 seasons.

==== Variety ====
- 14 September – Grande Fratello (Canale 5) (2000–present; see over)
- C'è posta per te ("You"ve got mail") – people show hosted by Maria De Filippi; 21 seasons (till now), Italian record for such kind of program. The hostess organizes a reunion in studio between two persons (friends, former lovers, relatives) separated by life; the invitation letters to the show are delivered by actors dressed as postmen, sometimes VIP as the famous goalkeeper Walter Zenga. The format, also if ravaged by critics, has got a constant public success in Italy and has been largely imitated abroad.
- Chi vuol essere milionario? – game show, Italian version of Who Wants to Be a Millionaire?, hosted (for 1706 episodes, world record for the format) by Gerry Scotti, 15 seasons and a spin-off.
- Ieri e oggi in TV ("Yesterday and today in TV") – anthology of various material (moreover musical) from the Mediaset archives; again on air.
- Premiata teleditta, cabaret with the comic quartet La premiata ditta, parodying the other Mediaset programs; 4 seasons.
- I ragazzi irresistibili ("The irresistible boys") – musical show with the singers, aged but still perky, Rita Pavone, Adriano Pappalardo, Little Tony and Maurizio Vandelli; 2 seasons.

==== News and educational ====
- Celebrità ("Celebrities") – magazine about gossip, with Silvana Giacobini; 2 seasons.
- Sipario del TG4 ("TG4 curtain") – magazine focused on gossip, ideated by Emilio Fede; on air till 2015.
- Terra! ("Land!") – magazine of investigating journalism, directed by Toni Capuozzo, on air until 2017; it's considered the most professional among the Mediaset news programs.

=== MTV Italia ===
- MTV Mad: Chi è Gip? ("Who is Gip?") – variety characterized by a demented and also outrageous humor, hosted by Giampiero Cutrino (Gip); 3 seasons.
- MTV Trip – reality show with the comic duo Luca e Paolo driving around Europe on a hearse; 4 seasons.
- Say What – Italian version of Say What? Karaoke, hosted by Marco Maccarini; on air till 2002.

=== Other channels ===
- Sesso, parlano le donne (TMC) ("Women speak about sex") – talk-show bound to the serial Sex and the City, hosted by Anna Pettinelli; 2 seasons.
- Le battagliere ("The pugnacious women"), on the Apulia channel Antenna Sud, and Catene (Chains), on the rival Telenorba – sit-coms in Bari dialect, both characterized by black humor and grotesque social satire. They get a noticeable success with the local public and last, respectively, for 4 and 6 seasons.

=== International ===
- 6 January – (United States) Futurama (Italia 1) (1999–2013)
- 7 April – (United Kingdom) Kipper (Italia 1) (1997–2000)
- 11 June – (United States) Buffy the Vampire Slayer (Italia 1) (1997–2003)
- 4 August – (United States) / (Canada) Dragon Tales (Italia 1) (1999–2005)
- 17 September – (France) Oggy and the Cockroaches (Italia 1) (1998–2019)
- 16 October – (United States) The Powerpuff Girls (Rai 2) (1998–2005)
- (United States) / (Canada) Ed, Edd n Eddy (Cartoon Network) (1999–2009)
- (United States) The New Woody Woodpecker Show (Italia 1) (1999–2002)

== Television shows ==
The year of the Great Jubilee is characterized, on the Italian little screen, by a spread, both in RAI and Mediaset, of religious fictions, often produced by Ettore Bernabei's Lux Vide, usually naive and hagiographic products but appreciated by the large public.

=== RAI ===
==== Drama ====
- I, Tigi, Canto per Ustica ("Song for Ustica") – monologue by Marco Paolini, played on the twentieth anniversary of the Itavia Flight 870.
- Il furto del tesoro ("The robbery of the treasure") – by Alberto Sironi, with Luca Zingaretti, script by Laura Toscano; 2 parts. In the Twenties, a cunning inspector of the fascist police foils a heist to the S. Peter's Basilica.
- La stanza della fotografia ("The room of the photo") – thriller about domestic violence by Antonio Bonifacio, with Cinzia Monreale.
- Vola, Sciuscìù ("Fly, Sciusciù") – by Joseph Sargent, with Lino Banfi in his first dramatic role. In Apulia, during the World War II, a mentally disable man becomes a hero saving three allied paratroopers.
- Il rumore dei ricordi ("The sound of memories") – by Paolo Poeti, from the Maria Venturi's novel, with Elena Sofia Ricci and Marco Bonini; 2 parts. A free-spirited mature woman falls in love for a younger man.
- Una storia qualunque ("A usual story") – by Alberto Simone, with Nino Manfredi and Agnese Nano; 2 parts. After thirty years of undue prison, an aged man tries to clear his name and to recuperate a link with the sons.

===== Religious dramas =====
- San Paolo – by Roger Young, with Johannes Brandrup in the title role and Ennio Fantastichini as St. Peter; 2 parts. Twelfth chapter of the LUX VIDE's Bible project.
- Un dono semplice ("A simple gift") by Maurizio Zaccaro, with F. Murray Abraham and Virna Lisi; a rampant businessman changes his values after his wife's death and the encounter with a nun, missionary in India.
- Lourdes – by Lodovico Gasparini, with Angéle Osinski, Alessandro Gassmann and Stefania Rocca; 2 parts. The movie interlaces the stories of Bernadette Soubirous and of a modern journalist enquiring about the Lourdes apparitions.
- Padre Pio: between heaven and heart – by Giulio Base, with Michele Placido in the title role and Barbora Bobulova; 2 parts.

==== Comedy ====
- Cornetti al miele (the Italian title can mean both "honey croissants" and "honey extramarital affairs") – spicy comedy by Sergio Martino, with Antonio Catania, Carla Signoris and Lando Buzzanca.
- Come quando fuori piove (As when it's raining outside, meaningless sentence, used in Italy to remember the card suits) – by Mario Monicelli, with Stefano Accorsi and Franca Valeri; 2 parts. The quiet life of the little town Cittadella is upset by the chase to the winning lottery ticket, lost at a poker game.
- Piovuto dal cielo ("Fell out of the sky") – by Josè Maria Sanchez, with Lino Banfi, Ben Gazzara, Stefania Sandrelli and Cristiana Capotondi; 2 parts. Two men, a janitor and a dentist, divided by the class differences and by sad family affairs, are forced to collaborate for sake of an abandoned child.

==== Miniseries ====
- Nebbia in Val Padana ("Fog in the Po Valley") – nonsense comedy by Felice Farina with Cochi e Renato (reunited after 25 years of separation) as an improbable couple of private eyes.
- La bicicletta blu ("The blue bicycle") – by Thierry Binisti, from the Régine Deforges' novel, with Laetitia Casta and Silvia De Santis; 3 chapters, coproduced with France. It's almost a remake of Gone with the wind, whose plot is transposed in France during World War II.
- Vite bruciacchiate ("Scorched lives") – by Carlo Arturo Signon, with Elio e le Storie Tese and Renzo Arbore; 4 episodes. The series, that tells the absurd adventures of an Italian rock band looking for success in the USA, was aired after midnight, with very low ratings, and no more replied or distributed in home video; despite its invisibility, in the years it has become a cult-object for the fans of EELST.

==== Serials ====
- Ricominciare ("Starting over") – first RAI soap-opera, set in Perugia, about the vicissitudes of two families (the publishers Vallesi and the middle-class Ruggeri). Aired daily, it's abruptly stopped after a single season for low ratings.

==== Music ====
- La Traviata à Paris – by Giuseppe Patroni-Griffi, with Eteri Gvazava and Josè Cura; the Verdi's opera is broadcast live from the real places of the story in Paris (also if the action is transposed in the year 1900); second chapter of the series La via della musica ("The music way").

==== Variety ====
- Greed – Italian version of the Fox game show, hosted by Luca Barbareschi.
- Tutti gli zeri del mondo ("All the zeros of the world") – musical show from Mirabilandia, hosted by Renato Zero.
- Tutti in piazza per capodanno ("Everybody in the square for New Years Eve") – show for the end of the year, hosted from Verona by Milly Carlucci; during the event, the new value, the Euro, is presented to the Italians.
- Zitti tutti, parlano loro ("Shut! They speak") – talk show with children, Italian version of Kids Say the Darndest Things, hosted by Carlo Conti.

==== News and educational ====
- Sermonti legge Dante ("Sermonti reads Dante") – complete and commented reading of the Divine Comedy by the writer Vittorio Sermonti, on the background of the Trajan's Market and the Pantheon; direction by Marco Risi.
- Beat graffiti - Sulle tracce di Jack Kerouac ("On the trail of Jack Kerouac") - with Emanuele Bevilacqua and Dianne Jones, reportage about the Beat generation.

=== Mediaset ===
==== Comedy and drama ====
- Dov'è mio figlio? ("Where is my son?") – by Lucio Gaudino, with Laura Morante; the broadcast of the movie, about the research of a kidnapped child in Cuba, curiously coincides with the Elián González affair.
- La casa delle beffe ("The jests' house") – by Pier Francesco Pingitore, with Anna Falchi and Pippo Franco; 2 parts. A Tuscan villa is the theatre, in various historical ages, of eight jests (plus one, in the year 2000, which frames the others).
- Operazione Odissea ("Operation Odissey") by Claudio Fragasso, with Luca Zingaretti, Daniele Liotti and Leo Gullotta; 2 parts. A police commando with codenames all inspired by the Homeric poems has to escort a pentito and to capture a Mafia boss; it carries out the two missions, also if at the cost of the commander's life.

===== Religious fictions =====
- Maria, figlia di suo figlio ("Mary, daughter of her son") – by Fabrizio Costa, with Yael Abecassis in the title role; 2 parts.
- Joseph of Nazareth, with Tobias Moretti in the title role, and Maria Maddalena, with Maria Grazia Cucinotta in the title role, both directed by Raffaele Mertes; first chapters of the Lux Vide series Jesus’ friends.
- Padre Pio, miracle man – by Carlo Carlei, with Sergio Castellitto in the title role. Realized in competition with a similar RAI's miniseries (see over) on occasion of the friar's beatification, it's the most successful TV fiction of the year, with 12.589.000 viewers.

==== Miniseries ====
- Les Miserables – by Josée Dayan, international coproduction from the Victor Hugo's novel, with Gerard Depardieu, Asia Argento, Enrico Lo Verso and Giovanna Mezzogiorno; 4 episodes.

==== Serials ====
- Giornalisti ("Journalists") – by Donatella Maiorca, with Fabrizio Conti and Donatella Cavalli; Italian version of the Spanish serial Periodistas, it does not repeat the success of the prototype and lasts for just a season.
- Questa casa non è un albergo ("This house is not an hotel") – by Raffaele Mertes, with Sabina Ciuffini in the (autobiographical) role of a mother of a family, former TV star, and Sergio Bustric.
- Tequila & Bonetti, sequel of the CBS series Tequila and Bonetti, with Jack Scalia and Alessia Marcuzzi; the setting is transposed from Los Angeles to Rome.

==== Variety ====
- Bigodini ("Hair rollers") – game show focused on Gossip magazines and set in a fictitious hairdressing salon, hosted by Max Novaresi; 2 seasons.
- A tu per tu ("Face to face") – talk show of the noon, hosted by Antonalla Clerici and Maria Teresa Ruta, then substituted by Gianfranco Funari.
- Macchemù – contest among the most famous title tracks of the Italian TV shows, hosted by Paola Barale; the winner is Giorgio Vanni with Pokémon.
- Operazione five ("Operation five") – anthology of the Canale 5 variety shows, celebrating the twenty years of activity by the network.
- Ricomincio da 20 ("I restart from twenty") – show celebrating the Canale 5's twenty years of activity, hosted by Mike Bongiorno and Paolo Bonolis.
- Provini, tutti pazzi per la TV ("Auditions, everybody crazy for TV") – hosted by Gerry Scotti; unfortunate auditions, taken from the Mediaset archives, are shown to the public, often in presence of the candidates themselves.
- Teatro 18 – show, hosted by Serena Dandini and Claudio Bisio, with singers and comedians performing together.
- Telenauta 69 – with Lilo & Greg; the program opposes nostalgically a fake 1969 RAI variety, shot in black and white and inspired to cult shows as Canzonissima, to pieces of the vulgar Italian TV in 2000.
- Wozzup, la casa di Italia 1 ("What's up, Italia1 house") – talk show aimed to the teen-agers, hosted by Daniele Bossari.

=== Other channels ===
- Disco 2000 (MTV Italia) – program about history of pop music, hosted first by Daniele Bossari, then by Giorgia Surina.

== Ending this year ==
- Avvocato Porta
- Bellissima
- Il brutto anatroccolo
- Canzoni sotto l’albero
- Cinematic
- Circus
- Fantastica italiana
- Fuego!
- Il grande bluff
- In bocca al lupo
- Linda e il brigadiere
- Lion network
- Momenti di gloria (1999–2000)
- Paperissima sprint
- Pinocchio
- Provincia segreta
- Le ragazze di Piazza di Spagna
- Solletico
- Target
- Vota la voce
- Zap zap

== Networks and services ==
=== Launches ===
Network	Type	Launch date	Notes	Source
Alice	Cable and satellite	Unknown		
CFN	Cable and satellite	14 June		
Inter TV	Cable and satellite	20 September		
Case Design Stili	Cable and satellite	October		

== Deaths ==
- 29 June: Vittorio Gassmann, 77, actor.
- 24 October: Silvio Noto, 75, presenter.

== See also ==
- 2000 in Italy
- List of Italian films of 2000
