= Democratic Energy =

Democratic Energy Energia Democratica
- Leader: Anna Ascani
- Founded: 29 September 2019
- Split from: Always Forward
- Ideology: Liberalism; Centrism; Reformism
- Political position: Centre

Democratic Energy (Italian: Energia Democratica) is a liberal and centrist faction within the Democratic Party (PD), a political party in Italy. Its leader is Anna Ascani, PD's vice president and deputy from Umbria, who was considered very close to Matteo Renzi, party's former national secretary and former Prime Minister of Italy from February 2014 to December 2016.

== History ==
The movement is the de facto heir of Always Forward, the faction which rose around Giachetti and Ascani's candidacy as secretary and deputy secretary in March 2019 leadership election.

On 17 September, during an interview to Italian newspaper la Repubblica, Renzi announced his intention to leave the PD, and create new parliamentary groups, led by himself. On the same day, interviewed by Bruno Vespa during the late-night TV talk-show Porta a Porta, he officially launched Italia Viva (IV). Almost every member of Always Forward, including Roberto Giachetti, followed Renzi in the new movement, while Anna Ascani remained within the PD, of which she was serving as vice president. After few days, on 29 September, she officially launched Democratic Energy.
