= Morgante (surname) =

Morgante is an Italian surname. Notable people with the surname include:

- Barbara Morgante (born 1962), Italian businesswoman
- Vincenzo Morgante (born 1963), Italian journalist
