= TGR (disambiguation) =

TGR is a brand name for Italian regional television and radio news programmes broadcast on Rai 3 and Rai Radio 1.

TGR may also refer to:

- TGR Motorsport
- Toyota Gazoo Racing
- Taieri Gorge Railway, otherwise known as Dunedin Railways
- Tasmanian Government Railways, a former railway operator in Tasmania, Australia
- Teton Gravity Research
- Terriblemente Guapo el Rey
- The Great Race (Thomas & Friends), a 2016 Thomas & Friends film
