= TG1 =

- Logo since 8 September 2022
- Starring: See Presenters
- Theme music composer: Egidio Storaci
- Country of origin: Italy
- Original language: Italian
- No. of episodes: Airs daily

Production
- Running time: 35 mins.

Original release
- Network: Rai 1
- Release: 10 September 1952 – present

TG1 (Telegiornale 1) is the flagship television newscast produced by Rai 1, the main channel of state-owned Italian public broadcaster RAI. It is the longest-running programme in the history of television in Italy as it has been broadcast daily since 3 January 1954.

It is shown domestically on Rai 1 and across the world on Rai Italia several times throughout the day. Gian Marco Chiocci is the current editor-in-chief. It was launched as simply Telegiornale, which was later renamed as TG1 in 1975–76. From 1992 to 1993 it was named Telegiornale Uno before reverting to the TG1 name.

== Programme format ==
The programme is generally presented by a single newsreader but with additional newsreaders for the sports. Most items are made up of reports and are generally preceded and followed by the correspondent reporting live from the scene. The programme is followed by a weather report known as Meteo and a financial news report, known as TG1 Economia.

== Criticism and controversies ==
The Undersecretary to Communications Paolo Romani, member of The People of Freedom, in an interview with the newspaper Il Tempo, has defined that the TG1 "seems politically affiliate with the Centre-left".

However it was criticized by the newspaper la Repubblica for political bias in favour of The People of Freedom party and its leader Silvio Berlusconi, when the politician Antonio Di Pietro requested the dismissal of the editor in chief of TG1 Augusto Minzolini, comparing him to Emilio Fede, editor-in-chief of a newscast broadcast by one of Berlusconi's networks.

== Opening theme ==
The opening theme for the newscast has been done by an orchestra since its debut in 1952, although the arrangement has been modernised several times, most recently on 8 October 2023.

== Directors ==
| Name | Directors | Time | Notes |
|---|---|---|---|
| Telegiornale | Vittorio Veltroni | 1954 – 1956 | |
| Telegiornale | Massimo Rendina | 1956 – 1959 | |
| Telegiornale | Leone Piccioni | 1959 – 1961 | |
| Telegiornale | Enzo Biagi | 1961 – 1962 | |
| Telegiornale | Giorgio Vecchietti | 1962 – 1965 | |
| Telegiornale | Fabiano Fabiani | 1965 – 1967 | |
| Telegiornale | Villy De Luca | 1967 – 1976 | |
| TG1 | Emilio Rossi | 1976 – 1980 | |
| TG1 | Franco Colombo | 1980 – 1981 | |
| TG1 | Emilio Fede | 1981 – 1982 | ad interim |
| TG1 | Albino Longhi | 1982 – 1987 | |
| TG1 | Nuccio Fava | 1987 – 1990 | |
| TG1 | Bruno Vespa | 1990 – 1992 | |
| Telegiornale Uno | Bruno Vespa | 1992 – 1993 | |
| Telegiornale Uno | Albino Longhi | 1993 | ad interim |
| Telegiornale Uno | Demetrio Volcic | 1993 | |
| TG1 | Demetrio Volcic | 1993 – 1994 | |
| TG1 | Carlo Rossella | 1994 – 1996 | |
| TG1 | Nuccio Fava | 1996 – 1997 | |
| TG1 | Rodolfo Brancoli | 1997 | |
| TG1 | Marcello Sorgi | 1997 – 1998 | |
| TG1 | Giulio Borrelli | 1998 – 2000 | |
| TG1 | Gad Lerner | 2000 | |
| TG1 | Albino Longhi | 2000 – 2002 | |
| TG1 | Clemente J. Mimun | 2002 – 2006 | |
| TG1 | Gianni Riotta | 2006 – 2009 | |
| TG1 | Andrea Giubilo | 2009 | ad interim |
| TG1 | Augusto Minzolini | 2009 – 2011 | |
| TG1 | Alberto Maccari | 2011 – 2012 | ad interim |
| TG1 | Alberto Maccari | 2012 | |
| TG1 | Mario Orfeo | 2012 – 2017 | |
| TG1 | Andrea Montanari | 2017 – 2018 | |
| TG1 | Giuseppe Carboni | 2018 – 2021 | |
| TG1 | Monica Maggioni | 2021 – 2023 | |
| TG1 | Gian Marco Chiocci | 2023 – present | |

== Key people ==
Director: Gian Marco Chiocci

Central managing editor: Maria Luisa Busi

Chief editor: Daniele Valentini

Deputy chief editor: Alessandra Mancusco

== Editions and presenters ==
=== TG1 Mattina ===
This airs from 6 to 8 am with interruptions for TG1 newscast at 6:30 am and 7:00 am.

- Micaela Palmieri
- Maria Soave

=== TG1 ore 6:30, 7:00, 8:00, L.I.S. ===
The L.I.S. broadcast airs at 9:00 am on weekends and on weekends, it airs between 9:30 and 9:35 am. On weekends there is no 6:30 am newscast. However, there is a 9:00 newscast on weekends with the same presenter that does the 7:00 and 8:00 newscast.

- Gabriella Capparelli
- Perla Dipoppa
- Giuseppe Rizzo
- Mariasilvia Santilli
- Virginia Volpe

=== TG1 ore 13:30 ===
- Valentina Bisti
- Barbara Capponi
- Paola Cervelli
- Roberto Chinzari
- Isabella Romano
- Sonia Sarno

=== TG1 ore 16:55 ===
- Alessandra Barone
- Francesca Grimaldi
- Cecilia Primerano
- Gianpiero Scarpati
- Virginia Volpe

=== TG1 ore 20:00 ===
- Giorgia Cardinaletti
- Laura Chimenti
- Emma D'Aquino
- Alessio Zucchini

=== TG1 Sera ===
This is usually broadcast between 23:00 or early next day (between 00:00-00:10)

- Barbara Carfagna
- Giovanna Cucè
- Susanna Lemma
- Virginia Lozito
- Carlo Maria Miele
- Dania Mondini
- Monia Venturini (formerly)

=== Past ===
==== TG1 Mattina - Rassegna Stampa ====
- Elisa Anzaldo (from 2022 to 2023)
- Giorgia Cardinaletti (from 2022 to 2023)
- Alessio Zucchini (from 2022 to 2023)
- Paola Cervelli (from 2022 to 2023)
- Laura Chimenti (in 2023)
- Marco Valerio Lo Prete (from 2022 to 2023)
- Mariasilvia Santilli (in 2023)
- Monia Venturini (in 2023)
- Susanna Lemma (in 2023)
- Daiana Paoli (in 2023)

==== TG1 Mattina ====
- Tiziana Ferrario and Lamberto Sposini (every other week)
- Paolo Giani (from 1986 to 1988, then in 2007, he introduced, the topic of TG in the course of Unomattina)
- Claudia D'Angelo (from 1986 to 1989)
- Fabrizio Binacchi (from 1989 to 1991)
- Manuela De Luca (from 1987 to 1991)
- Stefano Menghini (from 1988 to 1994)
- Maria Luisa Busi (from 1991 to 1992)
- Diletta Petronio (from 1991 to 1993)
- Stefano Ziantoni (from 1991 to 2003, then from 2009 to 2010 curates the various pages of Unomattina)
- Cristina Guerra (from 1993 to 2013)
- Ludovico Di Meo (from 1994 to 1997)
- Roberto Valentini (from 1994 to 1997)
- Stefano Campagna (from 2003 to 2009 and from 2011 to 2014)
- Leonardo Sgura (from 2004 to 2007)
- Francesco Primozich (occasionally in 2006)
- Laura Chimenti (spring 2006)
- Piero Damosso (from 2009 to 2010)
- Alessandra Di Tommaso (from 2010 to 2011)
- Marco Betello (from 1994 to 2016)
- Barbara Capponi (from 2010 to 2016)
- Sonia Sarno (from 2013 to 2019)
- Mario De Pizzo (occasionally in September 2019)
- Alessandra Barone (in 2021)
- Adriana Pannitteri (from 2000 to 2022)
- Dania Mondini (summer 2013, 2014 and from 2015 to 2022)
- Susanna Lemma (from 2019 to 2022)
- Andrea Gerli (from 2022 to 2023)
- Valeria Cucchiaroni (from 2022 to 2023)
- Micaela Palmieri (from 2016 to 2022 and occasionally in 2023)

==== TG1 Flash ore 12:00 (1983-1993) ====
- Danila Bonito (from 1983 to 1987)
- Bruno Modugno (in 1986)
- Alfredo Meocci (from 1983 to 1987)
- Marco Ravaglioli (from 1983 to 1989)
- Filippo Anastasi (from 1984 to 1991)
- Manuela De Luca (from 1988 to 1992)
- Stefano Menghini (from 1988 to 1993)
- Fabrizio Binacchi (from 1989 to 1993)
- Alessandro Feroldi (in 1991)

==== TG1 ore 13:30 ====
- Bruno Modugno (from 1976 to 1979)
- Alberto Michelini (from 1976 to 1981)
- Bianca Maria Piccinino (from 1976 to 1981)
- Bruno Vespa (from 1976 to 1984)
- Marcello Morace (from 1976 to 1984)
- Alberto Masoero (from 1980 to 1983)
- Claudio Angelini (from 1979 to 1992)
- Piero Badaloni (from 1981 to 1984)
- Angela Buttiglione (from 1984 to 1989)
- Liliano Frattini (from 1984 to 1987)
- Danila Bonito (from 1987 al 1991)
- Filippo Anastasi (from 1986 to 1987)
- Giulio Borrelli (from 1987 to 1992)
- Manuela De Luca (saltuariamente dal 1989 to 1991)
- Stefano Menghini (saltuariamente dal 1989 to 1991)
- Fabrizio Binacchi (occasionally from 1989 to 1991)
- Lamberto Sposini (occasionally from 1989 to 1991)
- Paolo Giani (from 1994 to 1997)
- Lilli Gruber (from 1991 to 1993)
- Maria Luisa Busi (from 1992 to 1994)
- Tiziana Ferrario (from 1993 to 2007)
- Marco Varvello (from 1994 to 1995)
- Margherita Ghinassi (from 1995 to 1999)
- Donato Bendicenti (occasionally in 1998)
- Paolo Di Giannantonio (from 1997 to 2010)
- David Sassoli (from 1997 to 2000)
- Francesco Giorgino (from 2000 to 2004 e dal 2006 to 2010)
- Attilio Romita (from 2003 to 2004)
- Manuela Lucchini (from 2004 to 2006)
- Susanna Petruni (from 2004 to 2009)
- Filippo Gaudenzi (from 2007 to 2011)
- Nicoletta Manzione (from 2009 to 2013)
- Laura Chimenti (from 2009 to 2010 and occasionally in July and September 2022)
- Emma D'Aquino (occasionally in 2013 and 2021)
- Alberto Matano (occasionally in 2013)
- Marco Frittella (from 2010 to 2020)
- Francesca Grimaldi (from 2010 to 2016 and occasionally in 2022)
- Elisa Anzaldo (from 2013 to 2017)
- Marina Nalesso (occasionally from 2016 to 2018)
- Alessio Zucchini (from 2013 to 2020)
- Maria Soave (from 2016 to 2023)
- Cecilia Primerano (occasionally in 2018)

Note: From December 1987 to June 1988 the 1.30 pm edition was hosted in pairs, made up of Claudio Angelini and Danila Bonito, and finally Giulio Sciorilli Borrelli and Angela Buttiglione.

==== Oggi al Parlamento ====
- Jader Jacobelli (from 1976 to 1986)
- Vittorio Orefice (from 1976 to 1989)
- Pierantonio Graziani (from 1976 to 1988)
- Nuccio Fava (from 1977 to 1987)
- Adalberto Manzone (from 1976 to 1990)
- Nicoletta Orsomando (from 1976 to 1990)
- Tiziana Amico (from 1987 to 1991)
- Rosanna Vaudetti (from 1976 to 1989)
- Fulvio Damiani (from 1978 to 1993)
- Roberto Di Palma (from 1984 to 1995)
- Giuseppe D'Amore (from 1986 to 1992)
- Giulio Cesare Pirarba (from 1984 to 1995)
- Pino Berengo Gardin (from 1984 to 1994)
- Adriana Retacchi (from 1984 to 1994)
- Alessandra Canale (from 1991 to 1995)
- Luigi Carrai (from 1991 to 1994)
- Pierfelice Bernacchi (in 1995)
- Raffaele Garramone (from 1995 to 1996)
- Giovanni Miele (from 1995 to 1996)

==== TG1 Pomeriggio ====
- Marco Ravaglioli (from 1987 to 1990)
- Alfredo Meocci (from 1986 to 1989)
- Pino Scaccia (from 1987 to 1990)
- Filippo Anastasi (from 1987 to 1990)
- Alessandro Feroldi (from 1987 to 1990)
- Fabrizio Binacchi (occasionally from 1990 to 1991)
- Lamberto Sposini (occasionally from 1989 to 1991)
- Claudia D'Angelo (from 1990 to 1992)
- Marco Varvello (from 1990 to 1994)
- Dino Cerri (from 1991 to 1995)
- Anna Scalfati (from 1992 to 1994)
- Manuela De Luca (from 1994 to 2004)
- Paolo Di Giannantonio (from 1994 to 1995)
- Diletta Petronio (from 1994 to 1995)
- Donato Bendicenti (from 1995 to 1997)
- Susanna Petruni (from 1995 to 1998 and from 2002 to 2003)
- Ludovico Di Meo (from 1997 to 2002)
- Filippo Gaudenzi (from 2000 to 2006)
- Stefano Ziantoni (from 2004 to 2009)
- Marco Franzelli (from 2004 to 2013)
- Piero Damosso (from 2006 to 2009)
- Nicoletta Manzione (from 2007 to 2009)
- Laura Chimenti (from 2009 to 2010)
- Leonardo Sgura (from 2009 to 2013)
- Laura Mambelli (occasionally in 2010)
- Alessio Zucchini (occasionally from 2013 to 2015)
- Elisa Anzaldo (occasionally in 2013)
- Barbara Carfagna (from 2010 to 2016)
- Valentina Bisti (from 2013 to 2016)
- Maria Soave (from 2013 to 2016)
- Marina Nalesso (from 2013 to 2019)
- Gabriella Capparelli (from 2020 to 2022)
- Barbara Capponi (from 2016 to 2023)
- Virginia Volpe (from 2022 to 2023)

Note: From the first half of the 80s until 2000 this edition was broadcast at 6 pm. From 2001 until 2014 it was instead brought forward from Monday to Saturday at 5 pm and on Sundays at 4.30 pm. From September 2014 to 2020 it aired Sunday to Friday at 4.30 pm and Saturday at 5 pm; from 2016 to 2020 the Sunday edition was postponed to 5.30 pm. From 2020 until 2022 it aired from Monday to Saturday at 4.45 pm (previously it aired at 4.10 pm and 4.30 pm) and on Sundays at 5.15 pm. From 2022 it will be broadcast Monday to Friday at 4.55 pm, Saturday at 4.45 pm and Sunday at 5.15 pm.

==== TG1 ore 20:00 ====
- Emilio Fede (from 1976 to 1981 and from 1982 to 1983)
- Massimo Valentini (from 1976 to 1984)
- Alberto Michelini (from 1981 to 1984)
- Vittorio Citterich (from 1982 to 1989)
- Bruno Vespa (from 1983 to 1990)
- Paolo Frajese (from 1984 to 1994)
- Angela Buttiglione (from 1989 to 1993)
- Maurizio Beretta (occasionally from 1989 to 1990)
- Danila Bonito (occasionally from 1991 to 1994)
- Piero Badaloni (from 1991 to 1995)
- Lilli Gruber (from 1993 to 2004)
- Maria Luisa Busi (from 1994 to 2010)
- Giulio Borrelli (from 1995 to 1998)
- Lamberto Sposini (from 1998 to 2000)
- David Sassoli (from 2000 to 2009)
- Attilio Romita (from 2004 to 2013)
- Monica Maggioni (occasionally in 2007)
- Tiziana Ferrario (from 2007 to 2010)
- Susanna Petruni (from 2009 to 2013)
- Alberto Matano (from 2013 to 2019)
- Francesco Giorgino (from 2004 to 2005 and from 2010 to 2022)
- Elisa Anzaldo (from 2022 to 2023)

==== TG1 Sport ====
- Fabrizio Maffei
- Marco Franzelli
- Donatella Scarnati
- Fedele La Sorsa
- Gianpiero Galeazzi
- Jacopo Volpi

==== TG1 Sera/60 Secondi ====
- Enrico Mentana (from 1982 to 1988)
- Tiziana Ferrario (from 1982 to 1991)
- Giulio Borrelli (from 1984 to 1987)
- Liliano Frattini (from 1988 to 1991)
- Alfredo Meocci (from 1988 to 1991)
- Lamberto Sposini (from 1988 to 1991)
- Manuela De Luca (from 1991 to 1994)
- Manuela Lucchini (from 1991 to 2004 and from 2006 to 2010)
- Francesca Grimaldi (from 1994 to 2010)
- Donato Bendicenti (from 1994 to 1997)
- Dino Cerri (from 1997 to 2002)
- Raffaele Genah (from 2003 to 2010)
- Marco Frittella (from 2004 to 2010)
- Alberto Matano (from 2010 to 2012)
- Emma D'Aquino (from 2010 to 2013)
- Maria Soave (from 2010 to 2015)
- Valentina Bisti (from 2012 to 2015)
- Cinzia Fiorato (in 2013)
- Marina Nalesso (occasionally in 2013)
- Mariasilvia Santilli (from 2010 to 2013)
- Alessandra Di Tommaso (from 2013 to 2018)
- Gabriella Capparelli (from 2014 to 2018)
- Perla Dipoppa (from 2015 to 2022)
- Gianpiero Scarpati (saltuariamente nel 2018)
- Isabella Romano (dal 2018 al 2021)
- Roberto Chinzari (dal 2018 al 2020)

==== TG1 Sera/Notte ====
- Ottavio Di Lorenzo (from 1976 to 1979)
- Leonardo Valente (from 1976 to 1982)
- Roberto Di Palma (from 1976 to 1985)
- Giuseppe D'Amore (from 1976 to 1986)
- Lucio Orazi (from 1976 to 1990)
- Luigi Carrai (from 1977 to 1991)
- Adriana Retacchi (from 1977 to 1991)
- Bruno Modugno (from 1979 to 1987)
- Pierluigi Camilli (from 1979 to 1987)
- Fabio Massimo Rocchi (from 1982 to 1992 and from 1997 to 2002)
- Manuela Lucchini (from 1987 to 1991)
- Francesca Grimaldi (from 1989 to 1994)
- Alessandro Feroldi (from 1990 to 1992)
- Nicoletta Manzione (from 1992 to 1994)
- Danila Bonito (from 1993 to 1994)
- Diletta Petronio (from 1995 to 1996)
- Mauro Mazza (from 1995 to 1997)
- Filippo Gaudenzi (from 1995 to 1999)
- Marco Ravaglioli (from 1997 to 1999)
- Paolo Giani (from 1997 to 2009)
- Marco Frittella (from 1999 to 2004)
- Puccio Corona (from 2003 to 2006)
- Cinzia Fiorato (from 2004 to 2008 and from 2010 to 2013)
- Barbara Carfagna (from 2007 to 2009 and from 2016)
- Laura Mambelli (from 2007 to 2010)
- Elisa Anzaldo (from 2008 to 2011)
- Stefano Campagna (from 2009 to 2010 and in 2011)
- Maria Soave (from 2010 to 2015)
- Alessio Zucchini (from 2010 to 2013)
- Marina Nalesso (from 2011 to 2013)
- Mariasilvia Santilli (from 2010 to 2013)
- Alessandra Di Tommaso (dal 2011 to 2018)
- Gabriella Capparelli (dal 2014 to 2018)
- Perla Dipoppa (dal 2015 al 2022)
- Gianpiero Scarpati (saltuariamente nel 2018)
- Roberto Chinzari (dal 2018 to 2020)
- Cecilia Primerano (from 2013 to 2022)
- Paola Cervelli (from 2018 to 2021)
- Isabella Romano (from 2018 to 2021)
- Giorgia Cardinaletti (from 2019 to 2021)
- Giuseppe Rizzo (occasionally in 2022)
- Virginia Volpe (occasionally in 2022)
- Giulia Serenelli (in 2022)
- Angelo Polimeno Bottai (in 2022)
- Micaela Palmieri (from 2022 to 2023)

=== Speciale TG1 ===
This airs only on Sunday at around 23:30. The coordinated edition was presented by Sergio Fratini and Massimo Proietti.

== Programmes ==
- Porta a Porta
- Rai News 24
- Unomattina News
- Unomattina
- Unomattina estate (summer edition)

== See also ==
- TG2
- TG3
- TGR
- Rai News 24
