= Rai Med =

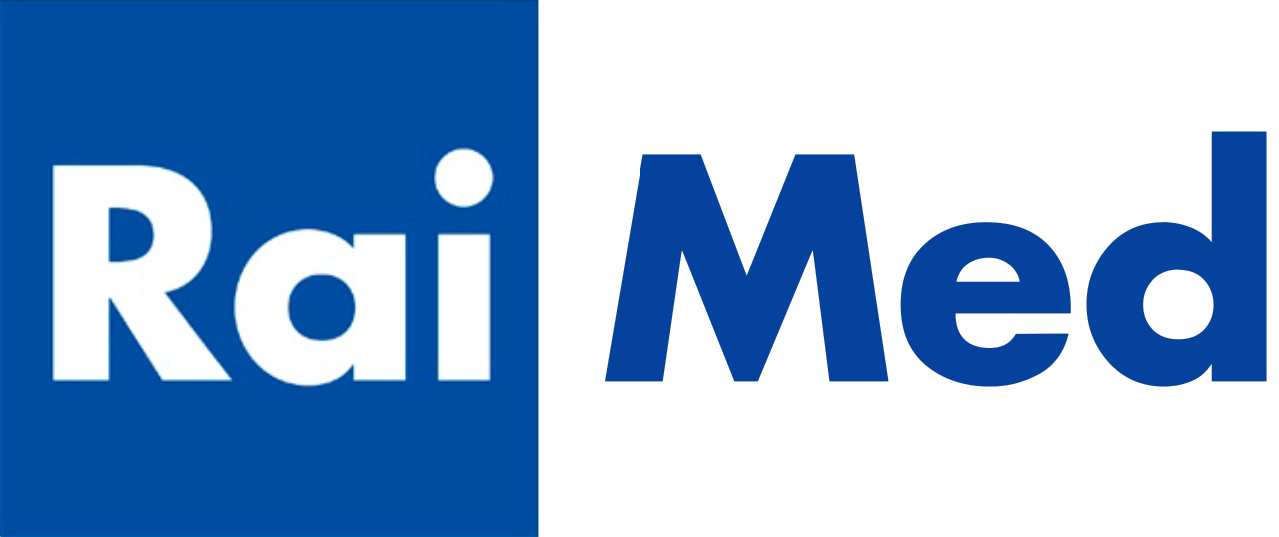
- Country: Italy
- Broadcast area: Maghreb

Programming
- Languages: Arabic; Italian
- Picture format: 576i (16:9 SDTV)

Ownership
- Owner: Rai

History
- Launched: 26 April 2001; 25 years ago
- Closed: April 2014; 12 years ago

Links
- Website: http://www.rai.it/

Rai Med was an Italian free-to-air television channel owned and operated by RAI.

== Overview ==
Mainly devoted to the Maghreb area, the channel provided Arabic and Italian programming from RAI, including in particular an Arabic dub of the evening edition of TG3.

Rai Med was in a timeshare with Rai News 24 and Rai Italia during its broadcast. Rai Med closed down in April 2014 due to programming no longer existing since April 2012.

On 23 March 2016, Rai Med, which has been on a black screen for some time, was eliminated from the Hotbird frequency.
