= Dick Helling =

Dutch footballer

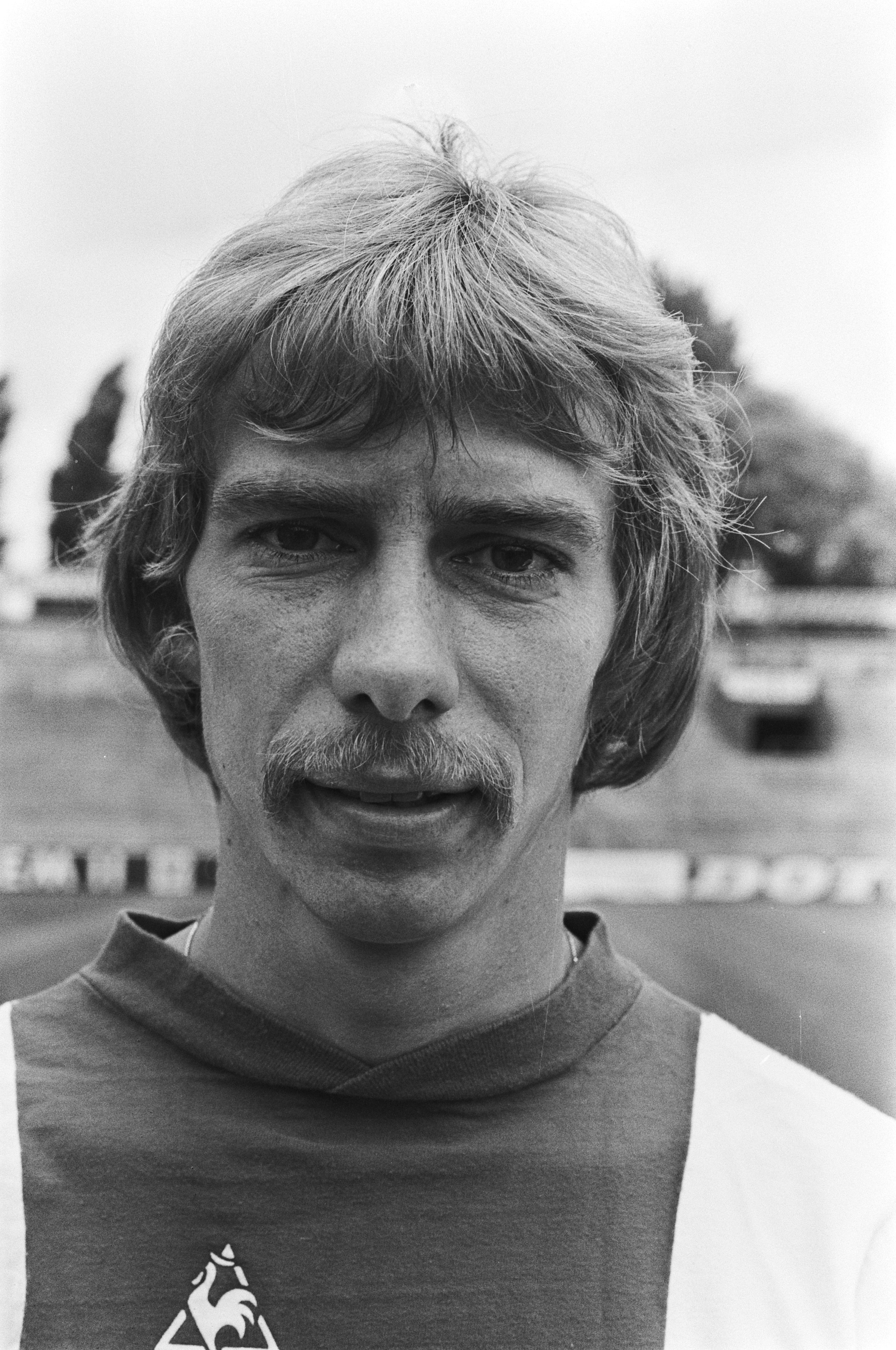
- Helling whilst with Ajax.

Personal information
- Date of birth: 22 September 1950
- Place of birth: Zaandam, Netherlands
- Date of death: 30 December 2018 (aged 68)
- Place of death: Krommenie, Netherlands
- Position: Midfielder

Senior career*
Years	Team	Apps	(Gls)
1968–1971	ZFC	51	(17)
1971–1975	Telstar	59	(11)
1975–1977	Ajax	21	(0)
1976	→ Telstar (loan)	17	(2)
1977–1985	Volendam	197	(46)
- Always Forward
Total		345	(76)
- * Club domestic league appearances and goals

Dick Helling (22 September 1950 – 30 December 2018) was a Dutch professional footballer who played as a midfielder.

== Early and personal life ==
Helling was born in Zaandam into a middle-class family; he was the middle child of three.

== Career ==
Helling began his career with ZFC, moving to Telstar in August 1971. He played for them until 1975. He next played for Ajax. Whilst at Ajax in 1975 he famously missed a penalty in a European Cup match against Levski-Spartak, resulting in Ajax's elimination from the competition. He made 29 appearances for Ajax – 21 in the league, 3 in the Cup, and 5 times in Europe. He returned to Telstar for a loan spell in 1976. He then spent 8 seasons with Volendam, for whom he scored 48 goals in 218 games in all competitions. At Volendam he was part of the team which won promotion in May 1983. He ended his career with amateur side Always Forward.

== Later life and death ==
He died on 30 December 2018, aged 68, in a hospice in Krommenie.
