= Pino Scaccia =

Italian journalist and blogger (1946–2020)

- Born: 17 May 1946; Rome, Italy
- Died: 28 October 2020 (aged 74); Rome, Italy
- Occupations: Journalist and blogger

Pino Scaccia, the pseudonym of Giuseppe Scaccianoce (17 May 1946 – 28 October 2020), was an Italian journalist and blogger.

== Biography ==
Scaccia was one of the RAI correspondents. He followed numerous events, from the first Gulf War to the Croatian War of Independence, from the disintegration of the former Soviet Union and the former Yugoslavia, to the crisis in Afghanistan, in addition to the difficult post-war period in Iraq (where he was the last travel companion of Enzo Baldoni) until the revolt in Libya.

He made numerous reports all over the world, he was the first Western reporter to enter the Chernobyl Nuclear Power Plant after the disaster, to be the first to discover the remains of Che Guevara in Bolivia and to show the hitherto secret images of Area 51 in the Nevada Desert. He also dealt with news with particular reference to the Mafia, terrorism and kidnappings as well as earthquakes and natural disasters.

Before dedicating himself full time to the activity of blogger and writer, he was editor-in-chief of the special services of TG1. He was a lecturer in the radio and television journalism master at the Lumsa University of Rome. He wrote 15 books. For years, Scaccia was a point of reference for the research of the Italian soldiers who disappeared in Russia during the Second World War. He edited the blog Letters from the Don. He published four essays with testimonies, photographs, letters, diaries of survivors or fallen of the ARMIR and edited the series "Amori maledetti" for Tralerighe libri editore.

Scaccia died on 28 October 2020, at the age of 74, at San Camillo hospital in Rome, where he had been hospitalized for a few weeks after contracting COVID-19 during the COVID-19 pandemic in Italy.

== Publications ==
- Armir, sulle tracce di un esercito perduto (1992)
- Sequestro di persona (2000)
- Kabul, la città che non c'è (2002)
- La Torre di Babele (2005)
- Lettere dal Don (2011)
- Shabab - la rivolta in Libia vista da vicino (2011)
- Mafija - dalla Russia con ferocia (2014)
- Nell'inferno dei narcos, with Miriam Marcazzan (2015)
- Giornalismo, ritorno al futuro (2015)
- Armir (2015)
- Voci e ombre dal Don (2017)
- Dittatori (Hitler e Mussolini tra passioni e potere), with Anna Raviglione (2018)
- Le ultime lettere dal fronte del Don (2019)
- Tutte le donne del presidente, with Anna Raviglione (2020)
- Un inverno mai così freddo come nel 1943 (2020)
