= Gianni Riotta =

Italian journalist

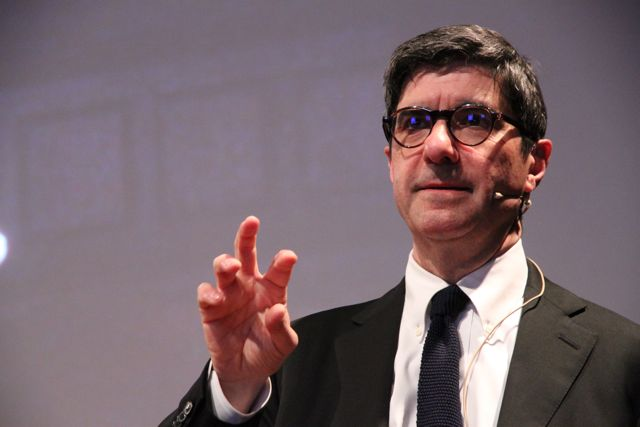
Gianni Riotta

Gianni Riotta (born 12 January 1954 in Palermo, Italy) is an Italian journalist, a regular contributor for the daily newspaper La Stampa and a former editor-in-chief of the financial newspaper Il Sole 24 Ore, Rai 3 and the news bulletin TG1. He has contributed to the Washington Post, Le Monde, Foreign Policy, and the New York Times. Riotta also has U.S. citizenship.

Riotta sits on the Advisory Council of the Department of French and Italian at Princeton University. He also collaborates with IMT School for Advanced Studies Lucca.

He received the America Award of the Italy-USA Foundation in 2013. Riotta is a member of the Council on Foreign Relations.

== Bibliography ==
- NY, on the September 11 attacks.
- Global War, essays on the Iraq War
- Prince of the Clouds (short-listed for the Prix Médicis)
