= Vincenzo Morgante =

Vincenzo Morgante (Palermo, October 1, 1963) is an Italian journalist, director of the RAI regional news programming (TGR).

== Biography ==
He graduated in Law at the University of Palermo with honors. He holds a BA in Social Sciences at the Pontifical University of St. Thomas Aquinas in Rome. He is married and father of six children.

In 1987 he was a member of the office of the then Minister for relations with Parliament Sergio Mattarella.

He wrote for the DC newspaper "Il Popolo" and at the beginning of the 90's was called as a correspondent from Sicily by the daily Avvenire. In 1991 he was appointed member of the Industry Advisory Board of the Sicilian Region .

Professional journalist since January 26, 1993, was the correspondent from Palermo for Il Sole 24 Ore. Started working for RAI in 1997. He has made the only RAI interview of Don Pino Puglisi, the priest killed by the Mafia in Palermo in 1993 and beatified by the Church in 2013.

He was assigned to the TG3 in Rome in 1999 as Vatican correspondent to follow the events of the Jubilee of 2000.

He was appointed chief editor responsible for the Sicilian edition of TGR in October 2003 by Angela Buttiglione. During his tenure the Order of Journalists of Sicily has awarded the Sicilian TGR the "Mario Francese Award", an award for "the high quality of information on the facts of the Mafia" in 2012.

Invited by the State Department of the USA in June 2007 he participated in the International Visitor Leadership Program.

He is a board member of San Marino RTV

He teaches Social Doctrine of the Church at the Pontifical Theological Faculty of Sicily. He has taught Theory and Techniques of Broadcasting at the University of Palermo.

On 17 October 2013, the Board of Directors of Rai unanimously appointed him director of TGR as proposed by the Director General Luigi Gubitosi. Its editorial plan was approved by the journalists of the TGR with 82% of the vote. Under his direction the TGR has started the process of digitization of regional newsrooms.
