= Sempre Avanti =

Always Forward Sempre Avanti
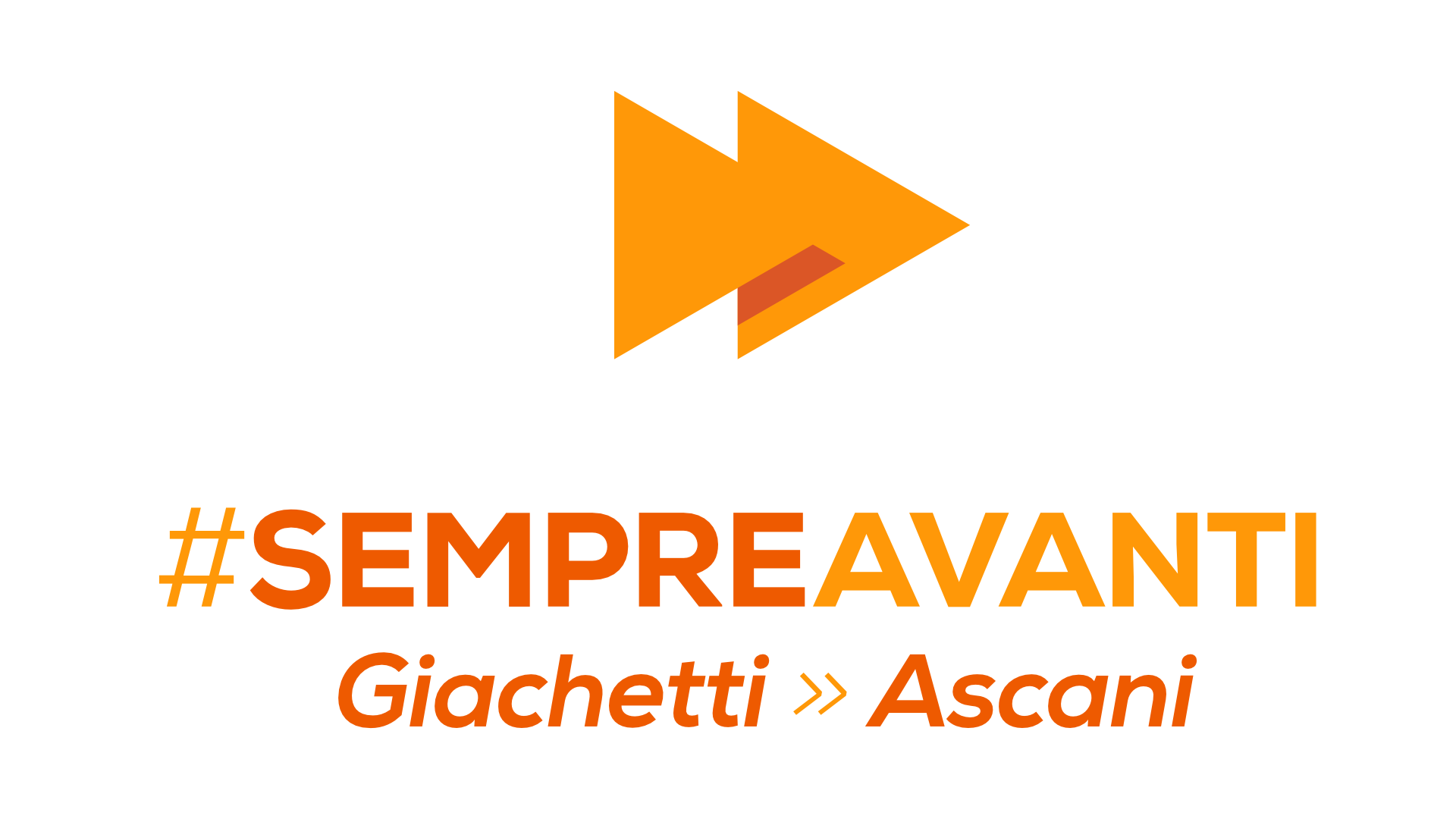
- Leaders: Roberto Giachetti; Anna Ascani
- Founded: June 2019
- Dissolved: September 2019
- Merged into: Italia Viva
- Ideology: Liberalism; Reformism; Economic liberalism
- Political position: Centre

Website
- Official website

Always Forward (Italian: Sempre Avanti) was a liberal and centrist faction within the Democratic Party (PD), a political party in Italy. Its leaders were Roberto Giachetti and Anna Ascani, close advisors of Matteo Renzi, party's former national secretary and former Prime Minister of Italy from February 2014 to December 2016.

The movement rose around Giachetti's candidacy as secretary in March 2019 leadership election, where he arrived third, gaining 12% of votes. Always Forward was considered Renzi's most loyal faction, which opposed any deal with secretary Nicola Zingaretti, a social democrat.

On 17 September, during an interview to Italian newspaper la Repubblica, Renzi announced his intention to leave the PD, and create new parliamentary groups, led by himself. On the same day, interviewed by Bruno Vespa during the late-night TV talk-show Porta a Porta, he officially launched Italia Viva (IV). Almost every member of Always Forward, including Roberto Giachetti, followed Renzi in the new movement, while Anna Ascani remained within the PD, of which she was serving as vice president. This brought to the de facto end of the faction.
