= Lilli Gruber =

Italian journalist and former politician

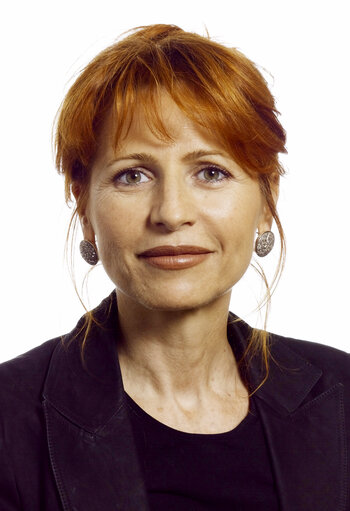

Member of the European Parliament for Central Italy
- In office 14 June 2004 – 30 September 2008
- Majority: Party of European Socialists

Personal details
- Born: Dietlinde Gruber; 19 April 1957 (age 69) Bolzano, South Tyrol, Italy
- Party: Independent
- Spouse: Jacques Charmelot (m. 2000)
- Education: Ca' Foscari University of Venice
- Profession: Journalist

Dietlinde "Lilli" Gruber (born 19 April 1957) is an Italian journalist and former politician.

Currently a talk show host for Italian private television channel La7, Gruber also served as Member of the European Parliament from 2004 to September 2008 with the Olive Tree centre-left coalition.

== Biography ==
=== Early career and resignation from RAI ===
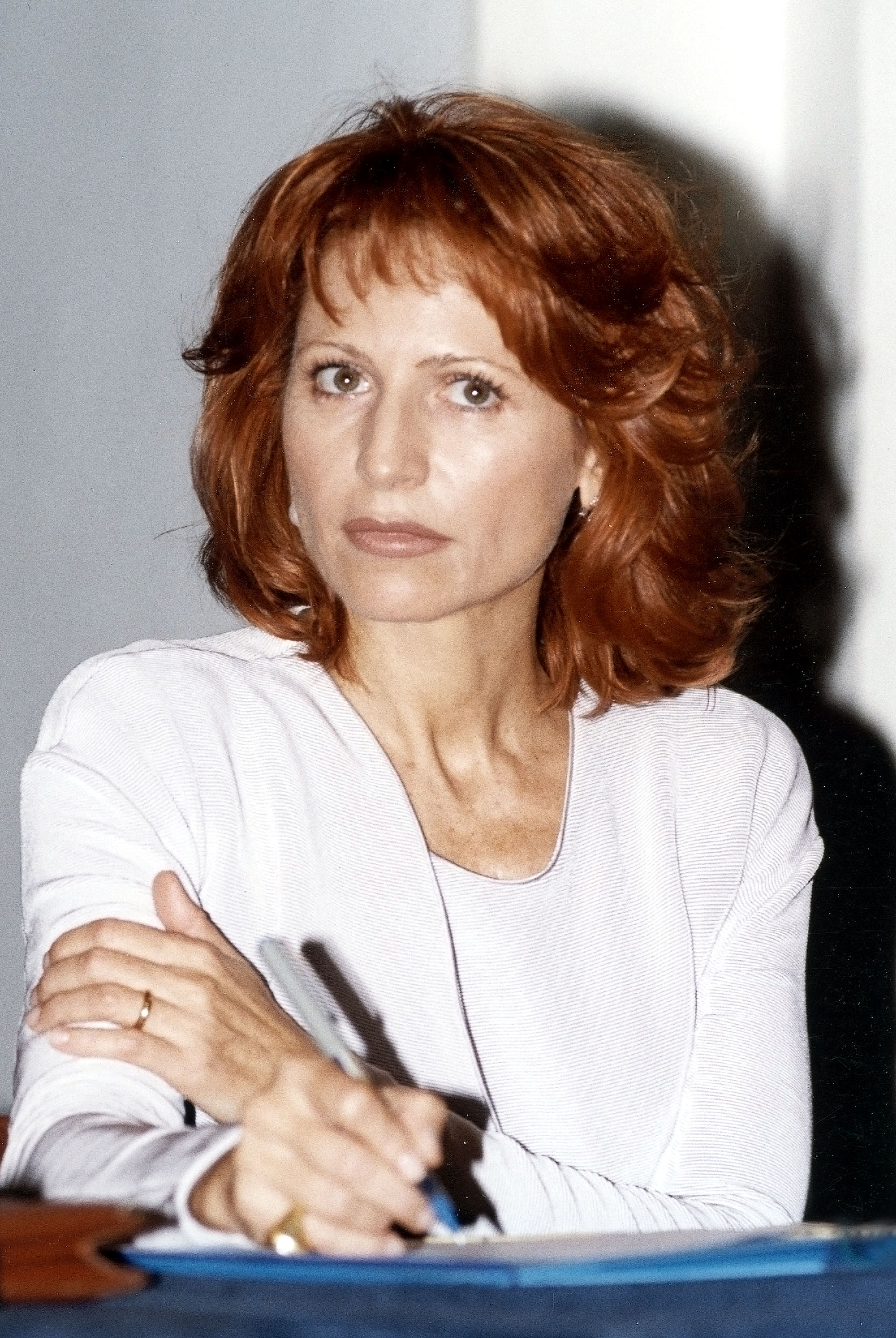
Lilli Gruber in 2003

Gruber was born in Bolzano and is a German and Italian native speaker. She attended the foreign languages and literature course at the University of Venice. In 1982 Gruber started her journalism career and in 1987 became the anchor of TG1, the main television news program on Rai Uno.

In 1988, she became political correspondent for RAI, covering events such as the collapse of the Soviet Union, the Israeli–Palestinian conflict, the war in the former Yugoslavia, the situation in the United States after the terrorist attacks of 11 September 2001, and the Iraqi war.

In 1999, in addition to her TV career in Italy, she also worked with the German TV broadcasters such as SWF (1988) and Pro 7 (1996).

In April 2004, Gruber resigned from her position at RAI in protest against the influence on state controlled media by Prime Minister Silvio Berlusconi. She attacked his "unresolved conflict of interest", and considered that RAI had abandoned its tradition of pluralism in order to support the government's views. Gruber has also worked for the Italian newspaper La Stampa, for "Io Donna", TV Sorrisi e Canzoni and Anna.

=== Member of European Parliament ===
In the European Parliament elections of 2004 she ran as an independent candidate for the European Parliament under the centre-left Olive Tree ticket; her candidacy was proposed, together with Michele Santoro, after she was pushed out of Silvio Berlusconi-controlled RAI. She topped the Olive Tree votes in two electoral regions, and beat Berlusconi himself in the Central region vote. After election, she joined the Socialist Group. Gruber served in the Committee on Civil Liberties, Justice and Home Affairs, and as an alternate on the Committee on Foreign Affairs and Chair of the Delegation for relations with the Gulf States, including Yemen. She resigned from her position in September 2008, months before the natural completion of her mandate, to return to her previous journalism career.

=== Back into national TV ===
After her resignation from European Parliament, in 2008 Gruber accepted an offer from private TV channel La7, where she took charge of the long-running political talk show Otto e mezzo (it).

=== Bilderberg invitation ===
She was included in the guest list of Bilderberg Group 2012 edition, at Chantilly, Virginia, as Journalist/Anchorwoman, and was the only journalist allowed at the 2013 meeting in Hertfordshire, England.

== Education ==
- 1993: 'William Benton Fellowship for Broadcasting Journalists' at the University of Chicago
- 2002: 'Visiting scholar' at the School of Advanced International Studies (SAIS) of Johns Hopkins University; for two years 'discussion leader' at the World Economic Forum of Davos

== Awards and honours ==
- 1991: "Numeri UNO" Prize
- 1995: Best Female Journalist
- 1995: Carlo Schmidt Preis, Germany, for distinguished service to freedom of information
- 1995: Fregene prize
- 2001: Spoleto prize
- For covering the war in Iraq, among other things
- 2004: Honorary graduate of the American University of Rome

== Works ==
- Quei giorni a Berlino. Il crollo del Muro, l'agonia della Germania Est, il sogno della riunificazione: diario di una stagione che ha cambiato l'Europa, con Paolo Borella, Torino, Nuova Eri edizioni RAI, 1990. ISBN 88-397-0594-5.
- I miei Giorni a Baghdad ("My Days in Baghdad", 2003)
- L'altro Islam ("The Other Islam", 2004)
- Chador (2005)
- America anno zero ("America year zero", 2006)
- Figlie dell'Islam (2007)
- Streghe (2008)
- Ritorno a Berlino (2009)
- Eredità (2012); Das Erbe. Die Geschichte meiner Südtiroler Familie. Droemer 2013. ISBN 978-3-426-30072-5
- Tempesta (2014)
- Prigionieri dell'Islam. Terrorismo, migrazioni, integrazione: il triangolo che cambia la nostra vita, Milano, Rizzoli, 2016. ISBN 978-88-17-08854-1

Media offices
| Preceded by — | Newscaster for TG1; 1987–2004 | Succeeded by — |
| Preceded by Giuliano Ferrara | Host of Otto e mezzo since 2008 | Incumbent |
Assembly seats
| Preceded by — | Member of the European Parliament for Italy; 2004–2008 | Succeeded by — |
