= Attilio Romita =

Italian journalist

Attilio Romita (born 1 August 1953) is an Italian journalist.

Born in Bari, Romita started his career as a journalist in a local radio, then in a small TV channel; in 1990 he became a Radio Rai journalist in Rome. During the 90s, he became a news speaker of TG2 and, in 2003, of TG1.

In 2022 he appeared on Grande Fratello VIP.

== Private life ==
Married to Angela, he has a daughter, Alessia. His marriage ended in 2008. He considers himself Roman Catholic.
