= Claudio Angelini =

- Born: 29 March 1943; Rome, Italy
- Died: 2 June 2015 (aged 72); New York City, U.S.A.
- Occupations: Journalist, writer
- Spouse: Olga Cortese
- Children: Gianclaudio Angelini

Claudio Angelini (29 March 1943 – 2 June 2015) was president of the Dante Alighieri Society in New York, U.S. political correspondent for RAI, the Italian national television network and was President Emeritus of RAI Corporation. He wrote several books and poems including Obama, un anno di sfide (Obama, a Year of Challenges).

== Biography ==
Angelini served a 4-year term as director of the Italian Cultural Institute of New York from 2003 to 2007, the Italian governmental agency for the worldwide promotion of Italian cultural affairs. His tenure was praised by some of the most prominent cultural and political figures, including U.S. Ambassador Richard Gardner and Professor David Friedberg, the director of the Italian Academy at Columbia University.

Became a Guarantor and ex-officio member of the Board of Italian Academy at Columbia University from 2002-2003 to 2005-2006

He was well known among Italian-Americans for hosting the weekly TV show "Zoom", on RAI International, a 30-minute lifestyle program focused on many aspects relevant to the large Italian community of North America.

In 1997 Angelini moved from Rome to New York, where he served as the U.S. Bureau Chief for RAI. He was the first Italian journalist to broadcast the tragic September 11 terrorist attack. Before moving to the U.S., Angelini was the director of RAI News Radio and the deputy director of TG1 (RAI 1 news office). He also served for 20 years as the RAI chief correspondent for the president of the Italian Republic. This role made him a familiar face in Italian households and earned him the affectionate nickname of the "Voice of the Presidents." Prior to these roles, Angelini anchored TG1 (RAI 1 TV news) and hosted the popular cultural program "Almanacco del Giorno dopo" for several years.

He has been editor-in-chief of important cultural publications including Fiera and has published many books of fiction and poetry with notable Italian publishers Rusconi Libri and Bompiani.

He also wrote a political column for the Italian daily newspaper Il Messaggero.

He was at times the President, Chairman and promoter of the Capri Awards for literary and cultural events in Capri which he founded with his wife Olga Cortese in the 1980s.

Angelini died in New York from a serious illness.

== Private life ==
He was survived by his wife journalist Olga Cortese and son Gianclaudio.

== Selected publications ==
1968 Prima della fine, Marotta won an Italian award for the best first book

1976 Viaggio di nozze, All’Insegna del Pesce d’Oro

1982 Malato speciale. Romanzo, Risconi won the Bancarello Opera Prima Award

1985 L'occhio del diavolo, Bompiani

1985 In viaggio con Pertini, Bompiani

1986 La grazza mia madre, Bompiani

1987 Gomorra, Bompiani

1987 Chiese di Toscana, Dalla Pieve romanica alla chiesa dell'Autosterada (co author), Silvana Editoriale

1988 Villa Adriana, (co author), Autostrada (Gruppo I.R.I. - Italstat)

1992 Il cerchio magico, Bompiani

1992 Racconti do vbita vissuta e da vivere, Ellemme

1998 Il mistero di Simonetta, (Nuova narrativa Book 11), Newton and Compton

2004 La Luce di Trani, Schena Editore

2007 The mystery of Simonetta, (Volume 50 Picas Series; Vol 50 Prose Series) Utp Distribution

2008 La foresta di New York (The jungle of New York), Rizzolli

2009 Fioro della lirica tedesca, Ediz, Italiana e tedesca, Sovera Ediioni

2010 Obama: Un Anno di Sfide (Obama: A Year of Challenges), Rizzolli

2012 Obama in Naples (Musical play)

2012 La donna d'altri, Bompiani

2012 Poesie a Manhattan, Passigli

2014 Manhattan Poems, Ekstasis Editions

2015 My wife in a chador : a play in two acts, Ekstasis Editions

2015 La moglie in chador, Aracne
