= Lamberto Sposini =

Italian journalist

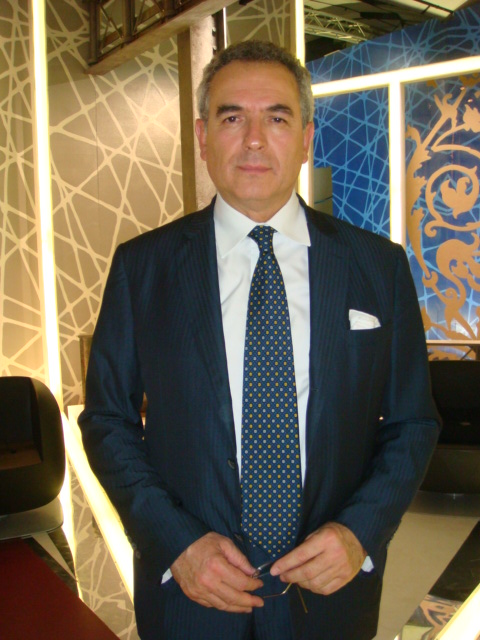
Portrait of Lamberto Sposini in 2008

Lamberto Sposini (born 18 February 1952) is an Italian former journalist and television presenter.

Born in Foligno, Sposini started his career as a journalist for the newspaper Paese Sera, then in 1978 he became a collaborator of RAI TV, working as a redactor, a correspondent and as a news speaker of TG1. In 1991 he moved to Mediaset, where he co-founded the TG5 and became one of its news speaker. After a short comeback at TG1 which he left in 2006 as a result of the disagreements with the new editor in chief Carlo Rossella, in 2008 he became the presenter of La Vita in diretta, a Rai 1 television program broadcast in the afternoon. In April 2011 Sposini was affected by a severe brain hemorrhage and retired from showbusiness.
