= Nicoletta Manzione =

Italian journalist (born 1966)

Nicoletta Manzione (born 14 April 1966 in Rome) is an Italian journalist. She is also the Director of RAI programme Rai Parlamento.

== Biography ==
Manzione studied political science, joined RAI in 1989 as an intern, and eventually became an editor. She joined TG1, where she was foreign manager and editor, and handled the 13:30 edition of the newscast. She also manages the programme Unomattina.

=== Director of Rai Parlamento ===
On 4 August 2016, she was appointed director by managing director Antonio Campo Dall'Orto.

As of June 2019, she is the correspondent for radio and television news reports from France.
