= Emilio Fede =

Italian journalist (1931–2025)

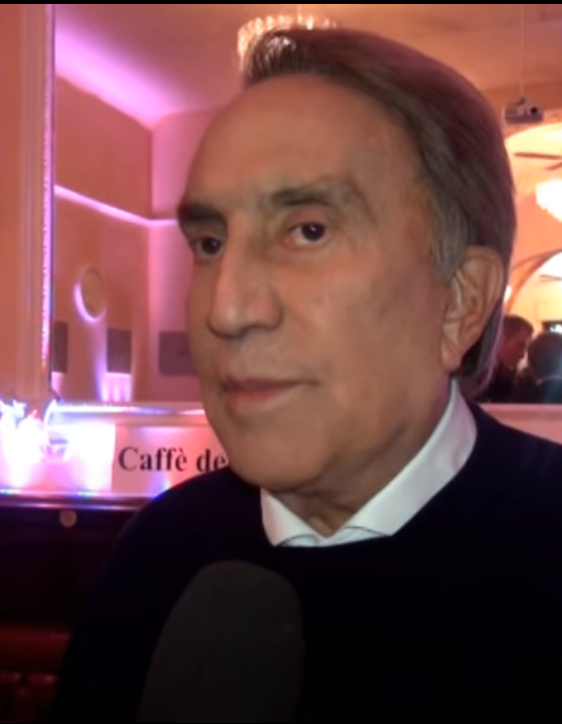
- Fede in 2016
- Born: 24 June 1931; Barcellona Pozzo di Gotto, Italy
- Died: 2 September 2025 (aged 94); Segrate, Italy
- Occupations: Anchorman; journalist; writer
- Spouse: Diana de Feo (m. 1965; died 2021)
- Children: 2

Emilio Fede (24 June 1931 – 2 September 2025) was an Italian anchorman, journalist, and writer. He was the director of TG1 (from 1981 to 1982), Studio Aperto (from 1991 to 1992), and TG4 (from 1992 to 2012).

== Biography ==
Fede was born in Barcellona Pozzo di Gotto, Sicily on 24 June 1931. He spent part of his youth living in nearby San Piero Patti.

He started his career in the Italian public broadcasting company (RAI) in the early 1950s, and went on to become one of the most popular faces in its news dominant television market share in Italy. Fede during the direction from 1991 to 2012 of TG4, a news programme on Rete 4, owned by Italian tycoon and former premier Silvio Berlusconi, has been often accused of excessive partisanship for Berlusconi in his news management.

Fede was later indicted for favouring prostitution of a minor in the framework of the so-called Rubygate scandal.

Fede died on 2 September 2025, at the age of 94.

=== Assault ===
On 24 November 2010, Fede was assaulted at a restaurant in Milan's city centre by Gian Germano Giuliani, the owner of Giuliani Pharmaceuticals.

=== Prison ===
In 2017, Fede was sentenced to jail for three years, six months because of bankruptcy. He was found guilty of pocketing €1.1 million that were supposed to be used to prevent Lele Mora's agency from going bankrupt. The court ordered him to pay back the money immediately.

== Books ==
- Finché c'è Fede (1997)
- Privé. La vita è un gioco (1998)
- L'invidiato speciale (1999)
- La foglia di fico (2000)
- Samba dei ruffiani (2001)
- La cena dei cretini (2002)
- Ladro d'amore (2003)
- Peluche (2005)
- Fuori Onda (2006)

All published by Arnoldo Mondadori Editore.

Media offices
Preceded by —	Newscaster for TG1; 1976–1981	Succeeded by —
Preceded by Franco Colombo	Editor in chief of TG1; 1981–1982	Succeeded by Albino Longhi
Preceded by —	Editor in chief of Videonews; 1989–1992	Succeeded by Clemente Mimun
Preceded by —	Editor in chief of Studio Aperto; 1991–1993	Succeeded by Vittorio Corona
Preceded by —	Editor in chief of TG4; 1992–2012	Succeeded by Giovanni Toti
