= TG4 (TV program) =

Italian television news

- Logo of TG4 since October 29, 2018
- Country of origin: Italy
- Original language: Italian

Production
- Running time: See Daily programme

Original release
- Network: Rete 4 TGcom24 (simulcast)
- Release: 29 July 1991 – present

TG4 (TeleGiornale 4) is the brand for Italian television channel of Mediaset network Rete 4's news programmes. They are shown domestically on Rete 4 several times throughout the day. Its current editor-in-chief is Rosanna Ragusa.

== Programme format ==
Rete 4 had a news program from its inception until 1984, named Gli speciali di Rete 4. However, in 1984, Rete 4 Ultimissima was established.

The programme is generally presented by a single newsreader. Most items is made up of reports, but may be preceded or followed by a correspondent reporting live from the scene of the report.

== Daily programme ==
- 11:55 am edition (30 minutes).
- 06:55 pm edition (35 minutes).
- 01:10 am edition (20 minutes): nobody (it is a collection of reports about main news of the past day).
- 06:00 am edition (20 minutes): nobody (it is a collection of reports about main news of the past day).

== Editor-in-chief ==
- July 1991–June 1992: Edvige Bernasconi
- June 1992–March 2012: Emilio Fede
- March 2012–January 2014: Giovanni Toti
- January 2014–May 2018: Mario Giordano
- May–August 2018, February–June 2019: Rosanna Ragusa
- August 2018-February 2019: Gerardo Greco
- June 2019-today: Andrea Pucci
