= Barbara Morgante =

Italian chief executive

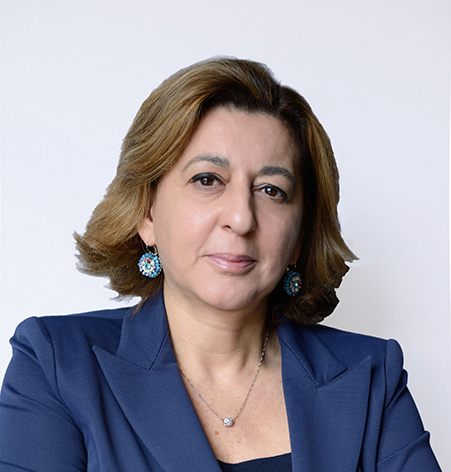
- Born: Barbara Morgante; 1962; Livorno
- Occupation: CEO of trenitalia

Barbara Morgante (born 1962) is the CEO of the Italian railway company Trenitalia, since 21 December 2015. She previously worked as business counselor and then she worked as marketing advisor. She started to work for Ferrovie dello Stato Italiane in 1995.

She graduated from the University of Bologna in Statistical and Economic Science in 1986.

In 1995 she joined TAV SpA, and in 1998 moved to the Commercial Directorate of the Infrastructure Division of Ferrovie dello Stato to take responsibility for the structure of planning and strategic marketing of the Strategic, Quality and Systems Directorate of Rete Ferroviaria Italiana SpA, the infrastructure manager.

In 2006 she was named Director of Strategy and Planning of RFI SpA, with responsibility for planning, marketing and business plans, international programmes and strategies for the development of the network.

Internationally, she is a member of the Infrastructure Commission of the UIC (Union Internationale des Chemins de Fer), project manager for the UIC's European Performance Regime project and vice-president of RNE.

In 2008 she was named Director of Central Strategy and Planning for Ferrovie dello Stato.

On 21 December 2015 she was named CEO of Trenitalia.

== December 2016 Investigations ==
Barbara Morgante is under investigations since 12 December 2016 due to the lack of safety precautions on Trenitalia trains.
