= TGR =

Italian regional news programme

- Country of origin: Italy
- Original language: Italian
- No. of episodes: N/A

Production
- Running time: 4 to 20 mins.

Original release
- Network: Rai 2 (until 15 December 1979); Rai 3 Rai Italia (some national programmes)
- Release: 1979 – present

TGR (Italian: TG Regione) is the brand for Italian state-owned public broadcasting company Rai's regional news programmes. They are broadcast domestically on Rai Tre and Rai Radio 1. It was launched in 1979 as TG3 Regione, and was known as Rai Regione from 1987-1992 before adopting the current TGR name from 1992-1999 (when its name was changed to TG3 Regione again) and again from 2002 onwards. Today, with about 850 journalists employed across Italy, it is Europe's largest broadcast news organisation.

== Programme format ==
The programme is generally presented by a single newsreader with additional newsreaders for the sports news. Most items are made up of reports and are generally preceded and followed by the correspondent reporting live from the scene of the report. It is a local news bulletin: the news only concerns the region to which the edition belongs (21 editions for 20 regions: for the Trentino-Alto Adige region two different news programs are broadcast, TGR Trento for the Trentino area and TGR Bolzano for the Alto Adige area) and the program only airs in the relevant region through the Rai 3 channel. The programme airs at 14:00 and at 19:30 and lasts 20 minutes. There is also a third edition, shorter, lasting about five minutes, called "Edizione della notte" (night-time edition) that airs at around 23:30 but sometimes a bit later. The programme is followed by a weather report known as Meteo.

== Daily programme ==
Rai also produces other programmes with the TGR brand, for a local or national audience.

=== National programmes ===
Programm	Channel	Weekday	Time	Rai Local Branch	Topic
TGR Buongiorno Italia (Good Morning Italy)	Rai 3	From Monday to Friday (except summer and holidays)	7 AM	Coordinated by Milan and Naples with connections to others regional newsrooms	National Information
TGR Leonardo	Rai 3	From Monday to Friday (except in summer)	2:50 PM	Turin	Science
TGR Bellitalia (Beautiful Italy)	Rai 3	Saturday (except in summer)	11 AM	Florence	Culture
TGR Officina Italia	Rai 3	Saturday (except in summer)	11:30 AM	Bologna and Milan	Economy
TGR Petrarca	Rai 3	Saturday (except in summer)	12:55 PM	Turin	Ecology
TGR Il Settimanale	Rai 3	Saturday (except in summer)	12:25 PM		Regional information
TGR Estovest (East West)	Rai 3	Sunday (except in summer)	11:10 AM	Bari and Trieste	European Integration
TGR Mediterraneo (Mediterranean Sea)	Rai 3	Sunday (except in summer)	12:25 AM	Palermo	Mediterranean Countries
TGR Regioneuropa (Region-Europe)	Rai 3	Sunday (except in summer)	11:30 AM	Rome	Europe-Regions Relationships
TGR Piazza Affari (Business Square)	Rai 3	From Monday to Friday	3:05 PM	Milan	Business, Stock Exchange, Economy
TGR Estovest Radio	Radio 1	Sunday (except in summer)	06:05 AM	Venice	European Integration

=== Regional programmes ===
Program	Channel	Weekday	Time	Topic	
TG Regione (Regional tv newscast)	Rai 3	Daily	2 PM	Regional Information	
TG Regione (Regional tv newscast)	Rai 3	Daily	7:30 PM	Regional Information	
TG Regione (Regional tv newscast)	Rai 3	Daily	12:10 AM (Between Saturday and Sunday at 11:30/11:40 PM) --- No longer a time slot	Regional Information	The third edition nowadays exists only in South Tyrol
GR Regione (Regional radio newscast)	Rai Radio 1	Daily	7:20 AM (except on Sunday)	Regional Information	
GR Regione (Regional radio newscast)	Rai Radio 1	Daily	12:10 PM (12:15 PM on Sunday)	Regional Information	In some regions also at other times
GR Regione (Regional radio newscast)	Rai Radio 1	Daily	18:30 PM (from Monday to Saturday)	Regional Information	
TGR Buongiorno Regione (Good Morning Region)	Rai 3	From Monday to Friday (except summer and holidays)	7:30 AM	Regional Information	

== History ==
It was created following the creation of the third RAI network following the 1975 RAI reforms. Until 1987, TG3 was in charge of the regional news bulletins; this changed in March of that year when TG3 became a national service. As a consequence, a separate unit called RAIREGIONE was introduced. Before the news reforms, TG3's regional bulletins aired at 7 pm and 10 pm. From August, in line with Rai Radio 1's conversion into an all-news service, the TV bulletins aired on RAI Tre at 2 pm, 7:30 pm, and at around midnight. The RAIREGIONE radio bulletins moved from Rai Radio 2 to Radio 1.

Coinciding with the launch of TGS (Testata Giornalistica Sportiva), the bulletin was renamed TGR on 21 October 1991. On 13 March 1995, a 10:45 pm bulletin was added. On 8 March 1999, TGR was incorporated into TG3's structure, forming Telegiornale 3 (initially abbreviated as T3 and later TG3 again), touted as "the largest newscast in Europe".

TGR regained its autonomy in 2002, being detached from TG3, when Rai 3 was given a new directorate under the opposition centre-left. The regional news unit, however, was put under the directorate of center-right leaning candidate Angela Buttiglione.

TGR Piazza Affari launched its new opening on 7 July 2015, which was then later followed by TGR Regional newscast a little bit later on 21 July 2015 for most of them, while some kept the same original opening, which has a different sound when switching to a different opening of the newscast. Most of the news station sets were changed mostly in August. TGR Buongirono Italia had new graphics since it started airing in Autumn 2015.

== Directors ==
- 1979 Biagio Agnes
- 1987 Piervincenzo Porcacchia
- 1990 Leonardo Valente
- 1993 Barbara Scaramucci
- 1994 Piero Vigorelli
- 1996 Nino Rizzo Nervo
- 1997 Ennio Chiodi
- 2000 Nino Rizzo Nervo
- 2001 Antonio Di Bella
- 2002 Angela Buttiglione
- 2009 Alberto Maccari
- 2012 Alessandro Casarin
- 2013 Vincenzo Morgante
- 2018–present Alessandro Casarin

== Presenters ==
=== TGR Piazza Affari ===
From Monday to Friday at 15:10. Presenters:

- Michela Coricelli
- Paolo Gila
- Sabrina Manfroi
- Fabrizio Patti
- Marzio Quaglino
- Chiara Rancati

=== TGR Buongiorno Italia ===
From Monday to Friday at 7:00 am. Presenters:

- from Milan for the Central Northern Italy: Maria Chiara Grandis, Anna Madia (one week a month from TGR Marche), Maria Rosa Monaco and Luigina Venturelli (one week a month from TGR Bolzano)
- from Naples for the Central Southern Italy; Lorenzo Bertolucci (one week a month from TGR Calabria), Simona Desole (one week a month from TGR Sardegna), Diego Dionoro and Marcella Maresca

=== TGR Buongiorno Regione ===
From Monday to Friday at 7:30 am. Presenters:

- Abruzzo: Alice Cercone, Roberta Mancinelli.
- Basilicata: Ines Siano, Igor Uboldi.
- Calabria: Livia Blasi, Gabriella D’Atri, Marco Innocente Furina, Mara Martelli, Ilaria Raffaele.
- Campania: Claudia Bruno, Diego Dionoro, Marcella Maresca.
- Emilia Romagna: Roberta Castellano, David Marceddu, Francesco Tomei, Lucia Voltan.
- Friuli-Venezia Giulia: Eva Ciuk, Nada Čok, Lorenzo Gherlinzoni, Livia Liberatore, Andrea Saule, Francesca Terranova, Anna Vitaliani
- Lazio: Rosario Carello, Eleonora Fioretti
- Lombardia: Simone Gorla, Maria Rosa Monaco, Eloisa Moretti Clementi, Marco Signorelli, Linda Stroppa; newspaper reader: Giuditta Castellanza, Claudia Mondelli, Laura Troja, Luigina Venturelli.
- Piemonte: Marzia De Giuli, Fabio De Ponte, Ludovico Fontana, Noemi Romeo, Martino Villosio.

=== TG Regione ore 14:00 ===
- Abruzzo: Alice Cercone, Piergiorgio Greco, Gianni Quagliarella
- Basilicata: Eugenio Montesano, Alessandro Panuccio, Nicoletta Soave
- Calabria: Rita Campanaro, Davide Gangale, Francesco Salvatore, Maria Teresa Santaguida, Viviana Spinella
- Campania: Andrea Caruso, Giuseppe De Caro, Alessandro Di Liegro, Fabio Forlano, Lara Martino, Margherita Rosciano
- Emilia Romagna: Roberta Castellano, Anna Maria Cremonini, Francesco Maltoni, David Marceddu, Virginia Novellini, Maria Chiara Perri, Francesco Satta, Sara Scheggia, Francesco Tomei, Lucia Voltan, Nicola Zanarini
- Friuli-Venezia Giulia: Giorgio Bearz, Marinella Chirico, Eva Ciuk, Nada Cok, Lorenzo Gherlinzoni, Livia Liberatore, Dario Ronzoni, Elisabetta Zaccolo, Alessandra Zigaina
- Lazio: Isabella Di Chio, Ester Maria Lorido, Mauro Scanu, Francesco Trapanotto
- Liguria: Mariangela Bisanti, Marta Buonadonna, Rita Lucido, Enzo Melillo, Emanuela Pericu
- Lombardia: Giuditta Castellanza, Roberta Di Matteo, Alice Monni, Marco Signorelli
- Marche: Jurij Bogogna, Federico Capezza, Lucio Cristino, Damiano Fedeli, Anna Madia, Anna Francesca Mezzina, Carlo Musilli, Samuele Sabatini, Matteo Tacconi, Alessandro Trevisani, Silvio Vitelli
- Molise: Francesco Abiuso
- Piemonte: Lorenzo Bertolucci, Manuela Gatti, Francesca Nacini, Camilla Nata, Maria Elena Spagnolo, Elisabetta Terigi, Maria Valeria Vendemmia
- Puglia: Antonello Cassano, Stefano Galeotti, Adele Lapertosa, Gianvito Lo Vecchio, Chiara Merico, Giacomo Susca, Andrea Tedeschi
- Sardegna: Cristiana Aime, Elena Laudante, Carlo Manca, Gaia Rau
- Sicilia: Lucilla Alcamisi, Salvatore Fazio, Roberto Ruvolo, Vicky Sorci, Debora Verde
- Toscana: Michaela Barilari, Cristina Benedetti, Laura Passetti, Emilia Rettura, Maria Serena Wiedenstritt
- Trentino Alto Adige: Matteo Battistella, Cinzia Berardi, Diana Benedetti, Nicola Chiarini, Laura Galassi, Anna Saccoccio, Paolo Scandale, Giovanni Stinco
- Umbria: Valentina Antonelli, Erika Baglivo, Federica Becchetti, Giulia Bianconi, Alessandro Buscemi, Alessandro Catanzaro, Elisa Marioni, Riccardo Milletti, Ivano Porfiri
- Valle d'Aosta: Selene Rinaldi
- Veneto: Maura Bertanzon, Roberto Bonaldi, Giuseppe Bucca, Elena Chemello, Lucia Cappelletti, Alessia Piovesan, Federica Riva

=== TG Regione ore 19:30 ===
- Abruzzo: Alice Cercone, Piergiorgio Greco, Gianni Quagliarella
- Basilicata: Cinzia Grenci, Grazia Napoli, Manuela Mele
- Calabria: Gabriella d'Atri, Marco Innocente Furina, Carla Monaco
- Campania: Letizia Cafiero, Luigi Carbone, Giuseppe De Caro, Piero Vitiello
- Emilia Romagna: Roberta Castellano, Anna Maria Cremonini, Francesco Maltoni, David Marceddu, Virginia Novellini, Maria Chiara Perri, Francesco Satta, Sara Scheggia, Francesco Tomei, Lucia Voltan, Nicola Zanarini
- Friuli-Venezia Giulia: Giorgio Bearz, Marinella Chirico, Eva Ciuk, Nada Cok, Lorenzo Gherlinzoni, Livia Liberatore, Dario Ronzoni, Elisabetta Zaccolo, Alessandra Zigaina
- Lazio: Davide Fiorani, Danilo Fumiento, Pasquale Notargiacomo, Cleto Romantini
- Liguria: Pietro Adami, Mariangela Bisanti, Marta Buonadonna, Marco Gervino, Simone Gorla, Martin Kucera, Rita Lucido, Emanuela Pericu, Oscar Puntel
- Lombardia: Michela Coricelli, Valentina David, Marco Signorelli, Federico Simonelli
- Marche: Jurij Bogogna, Federico Capezza, Lucio Cristino, Damiano Fedeli, Anna Madia, Anna Francesca Mezzina, Carlo Musilli, Samuele Sabatini, Matteo Tacconi, Alessandro Trevisani, Silvio Vitelli
- Molise: Sergio Di Vincenzo
- Piemonte: Lorenzo Bertolucci, Manuela Gatti, Camilla Nata, Maria Valeria Vendemmia
- Puglia: Carlotta Balena, Gianvito Lo Vecchio, Giacomo Susca, Andrea Tedeschi, Gianluca Veneziani
- Sardegna: Francesca Caria, Nicola Corda, Salvatore Lussu, Lorenzo Manunza, Gaia Rau
- Toscana: Federica Sevi
- Trentino Alto Adige: Matteo Battistella, Cinzia Berardi, Diana Benedetti, Nicola Chiarini, Laura Galassi, Anna Saccoccio, Paolo Scandale, Giovanni Stinco
- Umbria: Antonella Marietti
- Valle d'Aosta: Elena Baiocco, Enrico Romagnoli, Silvia Tagliaferri
- Veneto: Maura Bertanzon, Roberto Bonaldi, Giuseppe Bucca, Elena Chemello, Lucia Cappelletti, Alessia Piovesan, Federica Riva

== See also ==
- Rai 3
- TG3
