= TGR Motorsport =

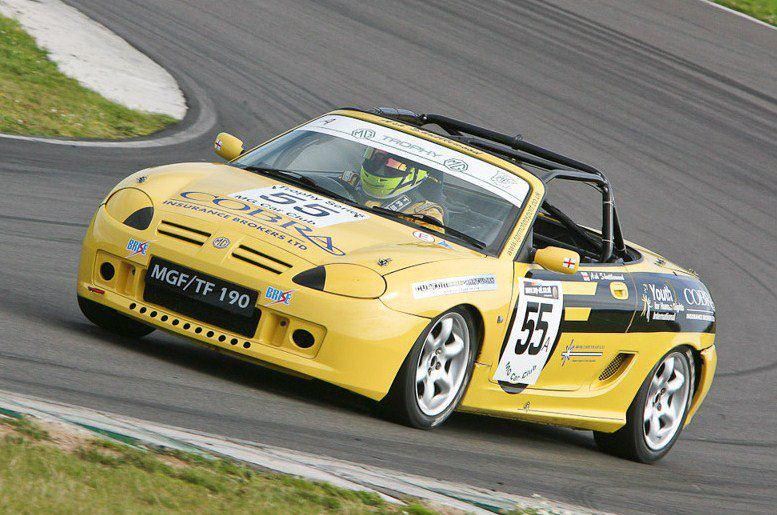
Ash Shuttlewood in the TGR Motorsport MGTF in 2009

TGR Motorsport is a professional motor racing team from the United Kingdom. The team was formed in 2008 by racing driver Ash Shuttlewood who was the C.E.O and currently drives for the team.

Ash finished 3rd in Class A of the MG Trophy in 2009, the team's first year of racing. Ash has been joined by Kaytee Shuttlewood as the Director of Operations from 2012 after 3 years as Chief Engineer. 2015 onwards sees the team expanding into several different championships and seeking both sponsors and investors.

In 2014 the sister company TGR Autocentre was formed to cover general car repairs and sales, situated in Kent UK

Other team members include:

- Kaytee Shuttlewood – Operations Director
- Luc Spaticchia – I.T Director
- Dee Thorne – No 1 Engineer Car 1
- Matthew Large – No 1 Engineer Car 2
