= Rai Italia =

International television service of RAI in Italy

- Logo used since 2017
- Country: Italy
- Broadcast area: Worldwide

Programming
- Languages: Italian; English (Paparazzi and limited subtitled programming)
- Picture format: 1080i HDTV (downscaled to 16:9 576i/480i for the SDTV feed)

Ownership
- Owner: RAI through Rai Internazionale
- Sister channels: Rai 1 Rai 2 Rai 3 Rai 4 Rai 5

History
- Launched: April 1996; 30 years ago
- Former names: Rai International (1992–2008)

Links
- Website: www.raitalia.it

Rai Italia is the international Italian language television service of Rai Com, a subsidiary of RAI, Italy's public national broadcaster. Rai Italia operates a television network that broadcasts around the world via four localized feeds. Programming features a mix of news, discussion-based programs, drama and documentaries as well as sports coverage.

The broadcast of the signal, sent from the Saxa Rubra television production center in Rome, is broadcast through several satellite, cable, IPTV and OTT platforms, as a paid service in the Americas, Africa and Australia while in Asia it is a FTA channel.

The channel falls under the Offerta Estero (International Offer) unit and produces original programs under the Rai Italy structure. The expansion took place in 2022, when the corporation announced the creation of a section on RaiPlay dedicated to such programming.

== History ==
Rai Italia's history can be traced back to the setup of the American subsidiary Rai Corporation in 1959. The subsidiary distributed radio and television programs in the USA, with special attention to the Italian-American community. Production only started in 1971, starting a two-hour programming block limited to the New York metropolitan area. The block was delivered over cable. Thirteen years later, in 1984, the schedule got an increase of about three hours, totalling five and a half hours and a schedule containing at least a variety show, a Domenica Sportiva segment and a local newscast. The following year, the weekly schedule increased to seventeen hours: two hours a day Mondays to Fridays, one hour on Saturdays and six hours on Sundays.

From Italy, exclusively from satellite, relays of the main news (either TG1 or TG2), a Serie A soccer match and cultural and entertainment programs arrived. Then a local newscast produced by Rai Corporation was broadcast. In the early 90s, the RAI satellite network achieved coverage in 29 cities, reaching 68% of the Italian-American community. Shortly afterwards the satellite signal expanded to Latin America. Thanks to the office in Montevideo, Rai distributed tapes of its content to broadcasters, entitites and institutions that were unable to pick up the satellite signal.

In April 1996, the channel upgraded to 24-hour broadcasts as Rai International. The channel was divided in three feeds: Rai International 1 for America, Rai International 2 for Australia and Rai International 3 for Africa. That same year, it started broadcasting to Dish Network as a subscription option. In December, it launched on Optus Vision, as part of a raft of ethnic channels added to the provider.

Its infrastructure was used in October 1997 to carry the FAO-backed Telefood telethon, where, in addition to the carriage of the event (also shown on Rai Due), it was tasked to downlink to television channels in the sixty participating countries. That same month, it announced the creation of Italica, an online project dedicated to Italian culture. Still during fall 1997, it started carrying Miss Italia's sister contest, Miss Italia nel mondo, after a controversy erupted the previous year involving Danny Mendez, raising awareness about the competition.

In April 2001, Rai International signed a carriage agreement with Time Warner Cable. The channel was initially carried in the NY-NJ head-end but would expand to the US East Coast at a later date. Major hotels and 50 US universities now received its signal.

The channel applied to the CRTC in 2003 in order to broadcast in Canada. At the time, the channel had a shadow audience of 10,000 viewers who watched its signal illegally using satellite decoders. The regulator finally approved it on 13 May 2005, after a long period of requests from the country's Italian community, under the condition that it would be provided alongside basic cable channel Telelatino.

The channel changed its name to Raitalia on March 30, 2008, adopting a new logo based on the spherical designs of Italian artist Arnaldo Pomodoro, using the spheres of the UN headquarters and the Ministry of Foreign Affairs (Italy) as references. In 2009, it was restyled to the current Rai Italia, adopting a logo matching the Rai channels.

From 18 May 2010, following a reduction plan approved unanimously by the Council of Administrators, Rai Italia ceased all of its original productions. From 7 October 2012, however, the channel resumed producing original content for the channel, with a new program, Cristiantà, broadcast on Sunday mornings.

In November 2022, Rai announced an increase in its international television offerings over linear and its Rai Play platform. Additionally, some English-language content (mostly subtitles) was added to the daily schedule, including a news bulletin from Rai News 24. There were plans to launch a standalone English service, but these were scrapped. Simultaneously, the channel's distribution to Europe began, with over three million Italian immigrants registered in Europe according to 2022 AIRE data. Agreements with OTT providers in Spain and the United Kingdom were signed in December 2023.

In July 2025, former TG1 vice-director Mariarita Grieco was appointed head of Offerta Estero RAI, subsequently some of Rai Italia's original programs were renewed, including its flagship Rai Italia.

== Audience and programming ==
Rai Italia is targeted at Italian expatriates, foreign citizens of Italian descent, and non-Italians interested in Italian language and culture; as such the network features a mix of the best programming from Rai as well as original programming created especially for this channel. In 2022, Rai Italia claimed to have an audience of 20 to 22 million viewers. The total potential audience is estimated to surpass 120 million.

Rai Italia started international television broadcasting on New Year's Day 1992 as Rai International, Rai Italia has worked under an agreement with the Italian government to develop the presence of public service in international radio and television broadcasting. Rai Italia also strives to meet the demands for information and services from Italian communities abroad.

Rai Italia broadcasts three television channels, via satellite, which vary according to the different geographical targets. No service is available for Europe as Rai's domestic channels are widely available free-to-air in this region. Rai Italia has organized the satellite service into 4 zones with each having a different localized schedule:

- Rai Italia Europe/Africa – Broadcasts to Europe (United Kingdom, Ireland, Germany, France, Austria, Slovenia, Croatia, Serbia, Bosnia, Macedonia, Spain, Czechia, Slovakia, Hungary, Sweden, Norway, Iceland, Latvia, Lithuania, Estonia, Finland, Bulgaria, Denmark, Greece, Malta, Portugal, Romania, Poland, Netherlands) and Africa
- Rai Italia Asia – Broadcasts to Asia (Singapore, Malaysia, Indonesia, Thailand, Vietnam, India, Pakistan, Bangladesh, Japan, South Korea, Taiwan, Mainland China, Mongolia)
- Rai Italia Australia – Broadcasts to Australia

In Europe, Rai Italia has broadcast for a short period (2008-2009) of timesharing with Rai Med (Arabic language entertainment, FTA), but this broadcast has ended.

83% of the annual output consists of productions from the three main Rai channels. The remaining 17% consists of original productions, which were boosted following the creation of the Rai Italy unit in 2022.

- Casa Italia: weekday format catering the diaspora, covering Italian topics. Presented by Roberta Ammendola. Created in October 2018, it was named L'Italia con voi (Italy With You) before the 2022 revision. During December 2019, it carried English subtitles.
- Cristianità: weekly religious program airing for about two hours on Sundays. The format broadcasts the Holy Mass and the Angelus live from the Vatican. Presented by Myriam Casteli. The channel also broadcasts Papal audiences on Wednesdays (as a collaboration with Rai Vaticano). The program is also one of the channel's oldest original productions still on air; the program also receives calls from the Italian diaspora, particularly in the Americas, as well as their religious events.
- Il Confronto: Half-hour weekly program discussing political and economic topics of relevance in Italy with two experts from both sides. Presented by Monica Setta.
- Italian Colors: Created by means of collaboration with TGR, the items come from Rai's regional centers and consists of TGR's tourism-centric segments, often with English subtitles.
- Paparazzi: English-language magazine programme showing Italian culture and trending topics. Presented by Filippo Solibello and Marco Ardemagni who were both working on Rai Radio 2 at the time of its creation. Initially a half-hour program, beginning in its second season in 2023, its length increased to 45 minutes.
- English-language newscast from Rai News 24: created in line with the 2022 Rai Italia reforms, a five-minute news bulletin in English is shown, presented by an Italian-American journalist.
- Italian Food: strand which was created following the signing of an agreement with the Italian pay television channel Gambero Rosso Channel to provide Rai Italia with 150 hours worth of its original productions, which, in exchange, are shown with English subtitles. In 2024, Gambero Rosso produced the second season of Pizzagirls to air on this channel first.
- Che Classe!: Sitcom set in a classroom with the aim of learning Italian, shown in the summer of 2024, with subtitles in both English and Italian.
- La Giostra del Gol: sports program with highlights of Italian football and other competitions. Originally a program on mainline Rai channels in Italy in 1977, it was revived as a Rai Italia original in 2025 presented by Stefano Orsini, and is produced in association with Rai Sport.

Other formats also exist, including formats about the diaspora in general, "Made in Italy" topics, documentaries about the country, etc. The content is also available on the Rai Italy section of RaiPlay.

== Logos ==
2008–2011

2011–2017

Since 2017

== See also ==
- RAI, Italy's publicly funded national broadcaster
- Rai Satelradio Italy's former international radio service
- Mediaset Italia
