= TG3 =

- Logo of TG3 since September 21, 2026
- Starring: See Presenters
- Country of origin: Italy
- Original language: Italian
- No. of episodes: N/A

Production
- Running time: 30 mins.

Original release
- Network: Rai 3 Rai Italia (occasionally)
- Release: 15 December 1979 – present

TG3 (TeleGiornale 3) is the brand for Italian state-owned TV channel Rai 3's news programmes. They are shown domestically and across Europe on Rai 3. The newscasts are aired from Rai's Studios in Saxa Rubra, Rome, Italy, except for the 12 pm edition which is broadcast from Milan The head-journalist of the show is Pierluca Terzulli from 21 march 2025. It was launched in 1979, and was named T3 (Telegiornale 3) from 1999 to 2000.

== Directors of the TG3 ==
Name	Period
Biagio Agnes	15 December 1979 – 14 September 1980
Luca Di Schiena	15 September 1980 – 31 May 1987
Sandro Curzi	1 June 1987 – 1 August 1993
Andrea Giubilo	2 August 1993 – 11 September 1994
Daniela Brancati	12 September 1994 – 7 May 1995
Italo Moretti	8 May 1995 – 28 April 1996
Lucia Annunziata	29 April 1996 – 17 May 1997
Nuccio Fava	19 May 1997 – 3 May 1998
Ennio Chiodi	4 May 1998 – 2 April 2000
Nino Rizzo Nervo	3 April 2000 – 3 June 2001
Antonio Di Bella*	4 June 2001 – 30 September 2009
Bianca Berlinguer	1 October 2009 – 5 August 2016
Luca Mazzà	6 August 2016 – 30 October 2018
Giuseppina Paterniti	31 October 2018 – 14 May 2020
Mario Orfeo	15 May 2020 – 18 November 2021, 9 June 2022 – 6 October 2024
Simona Sala	18 November 2021 – 9 June 2022
Pierluca Terzulli	since 6 October 2024

Note: the names highlighted in blue concern the directors who, in addition to directing the TG3, also directed the TGR.

- Antonio Di Bella is director of TGR only from 2001 to 2002.

== Programme format ==
The programme is generally presented by a single newsreader Most items will be made up of reports and are generally preceded and followed by the correspondent reporting live from the scene of the report.

== Daily programme ==
They are also other features with TG3 brand, all on Rai 3:

- GT Ragazzi (devoted to a youth audiences, aired on Rai Gulp).

== Criticism and controversies ==
The Undersecretary to Communications Paolo Romani, member of The People of Freedom, in an interview with the newspaper Il Tempo, has defined that the TG3 "is politically affiliate with the Leftists".

== Presenters ==
=== TG3 Linea Notte ===
This is aired from Monday to Friday at 00:00 (58 minutes), summer editions are known as TG3 Linea Notte Estate which airs between 23:00 and 23:30. Presenters:

- Maurizio Mannoni (until 2023)
- Monica Giandotti (September 5, 2023 – present)

=== TG3 Flash ===
This is aired on Sunday, between 23:00 and 00:00 (7–10 minutes).

- Tindara Caccetta
- Niccolò Bellagamba
- Paolo Piras
- Sara Segatori
- Giusi Sansone

=== TG3 Mondo ===
This is aired on Saturdays and Sundays between 23:00 and 00:00. Presenters:

- Maria Cuffaro

=== TG3 ore 12:00 ===
This newscast comes from Milan, Italy

- Paolo Pasi
- Paola Maria Anelli
- Annamaria Levorin
- Jari Pilati

=== TG3 Fuori TG ===
This is aired from Monday to Friday at 13:40 (19–20 minutes). Presenters:

- Maria Rosaria De Medici

=== TG3 ore 14:20 ===
This is aired from Monday to Saturday at 14:20, Sundays at 14:15 (15–25 minutes). Presenters:

- Cristiana Palazzoni
- Andrea Rustichelli
- Jacopo Matano
- Anna Frangione
- Giusi Sansone

=== TG3 LIS ===
This edition is signed for the deaf. It's aired from Monday to Saturday at 14:55, Sundays at 12:55 (2–3 minutes). Presenters are the same of 14:20 edition.

=== TG3 ore 19:00 ===
This airs every day at 19:00 (30–32 minutes). Presenters:

- Mario Franco Cao
- Chiara Garzilli
- Elisabetta Margonari
- Tatiana Lisanti

=== Speciale TG3 ===
This only airs during certain time of the year. This is usually live reporting of major events happening around the world or events going on in Italy

== TG3 Web ==
TG3 offers both Internet and TV content on the web. The site offers live and archived broadcasts, recorded newscasts, and extra images, interviews and services not available offline. It also offers communication with the editorial team.

The exclusive rubrics for the web:

- Tg3 Tech
- Tg3 Tech Books
- Tg3 Comics
- Tg3 Ludus
- Tg3 La Vignetta
- Tg3 Videochat

== Direction ==
- Director:
  - Pierluca Terzulli
- Vicedirector:
  - Maurizio Ambrogi
  - Carmen Santoro
  - Giorgio Saba
  - Antonella Zunica

== See also ==
- Rai 3
