= Bruno Vespa =

Italian television and newspaper journalist

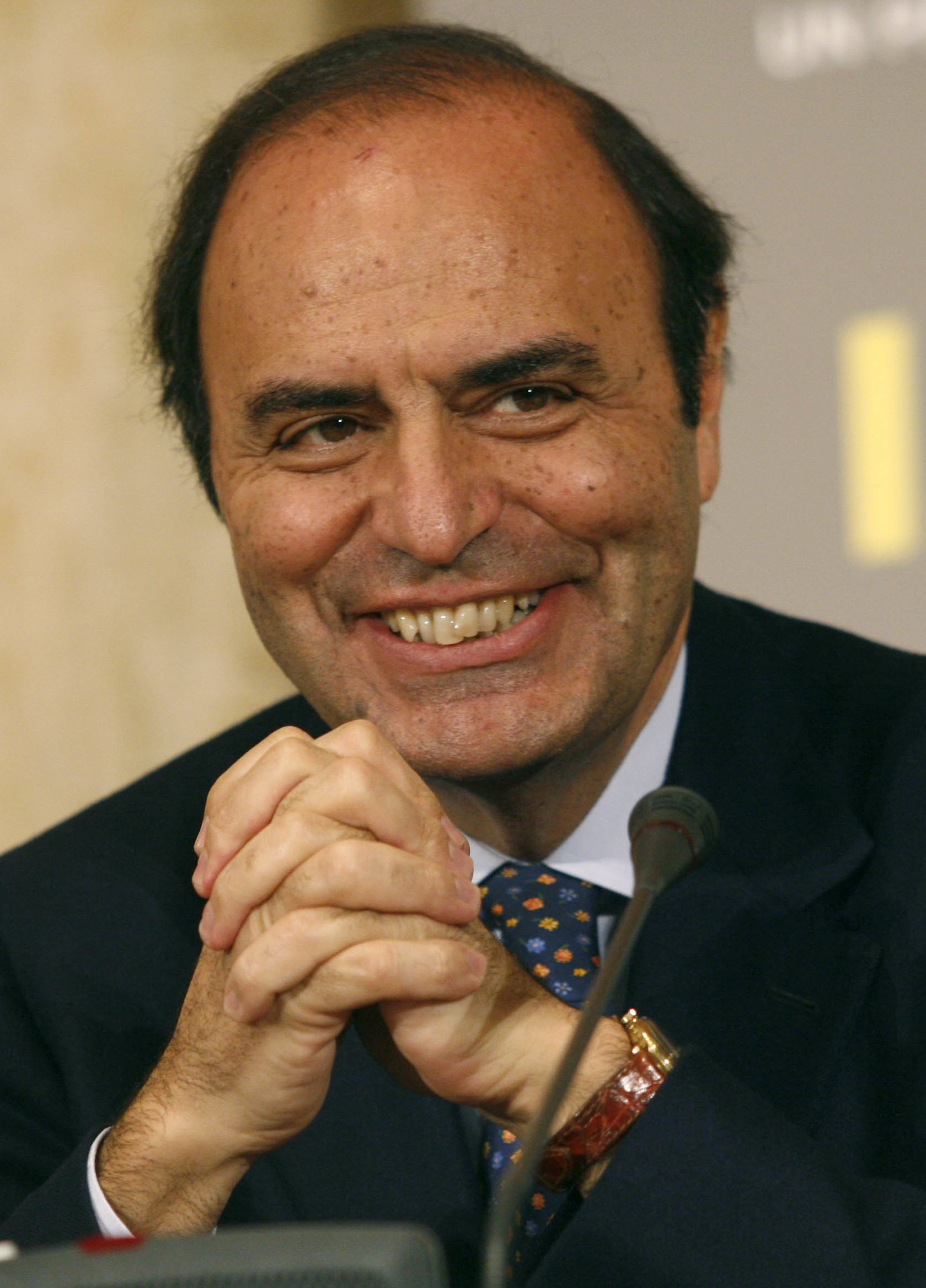
- Born: 27 May 1944 (age 82); L'Aquila, Kingdom of Italy
- Other name: Vespa
- Occupation: Journalist
- Years active: 1960–present
- Height: 1.74 m (5 ft 9 in)
- Spouse: Augusta Iannini (m. 1975)
- Children: 2

Bruno Paolo Vespa (born 27 May 1944) is an Italian television and newspaper journalist. A former director of the Italian state-owned TV channel Rai 1's news programme TG1, Vespa is the founding host of the programme Porta a Porta (English: "Door to door"), which has been broadcast without interruption on RAI channels since 1996.

== Biography ==
=== Early life ===
Vespa was born in L'Aquila, Abruzzo. He is married to Augusta Iannini, who is a judge.

=== Journalist career ===
Vespa began working with the local press in his native Abruzzo at a relatively young age, authoring sports articles for the L'Aquila branch of the newspaper Il Tempo when he was sixteen years old.

In 1962, he became a radio announcer on RAI broadcasts and, after obtaining his LL.B. in 1968, began hosting the daily newscast Telegiornale RAI (afterwards renamed TG1).

During the 1970s and 1980s, he undertook several controversial and ground-breaking projects, mainly as a foreign correspondent for RAI, interviewing many soon-to-be-influential personalities of the decades (for example, Vespa interviewed then-Cardinal Karol Wojtyła in 1977, a full year before his election to the pontificate).

In 1977 he co-hosted, with Arrigo Petacco, the news programme Tam Tam, moving the following year to a different format, precursor to that of Porta a Porta, where up-and-coming personalities and current events were discussed in front of a live studio audience, which participated to the exchange through Q&A sessions (hence, the program was called Ping Pong).

In June 1984, he was named "official commentator" for the live, televised broadcast of the state funeral for Enrico Berlinguer, who had been the leader of the Italian Communist Party. During the broadcast, he erroneously announced that Pietro Valpreda had been found guilty of the Piazza Fontana bombing, whereas he was a mere suspect, at the time—a mistake for which he publicly apologised on several occasions.

Between 1989 and 1992, while he was the head newscaster for the RAI news programme TG1, he came under attack for publicly declaring that he considered the ruling party Christian Democracy his "editorial sounding board"; because RAI stations are state-owned and publicly funded, they are expected to be unbiased, which Vespa's words indicated not to be the case.
On 11 January 1991, the RAI aired the interview to Saddam Hussein and Vespa become the unique Italian journalist to have interviewed the Iraqi leader. In August 1990, when the Gulf War erupted, he supported the armed intervention in a much-criticised editorial that concluded that "War has been brought forth by the international community. And if we want to be members of that club, we must pay our dues."

Since 1996, Vespa has been at the helm of the news programme Porta a Porta, where much of Italy's political debate takes place, so much so that it is sometimes sarcastically referred to as "the third house" (together with the Chamber of Deputies and the Senate) of the Parliament of Italy. In 2000, his wife Augusta Iannini definitively closed the inquiry conducted in 1992–1993 by the Italian Public Prosecutor of Palmi, Agostino Cordova, on the relations between mafia and the Italian Freemasonry. In 1994, Cordova was transferred to Naples, and the inquiry had been moved to the Procura della Repubblica of Rome, where it didn't make any progress for the following six years.

On 3 April 2006, Vespa moderated the second televised debate between then-Prime Minister of Italy Silvio Berlusconi and the leader of the centre-left coalition Romano Prodi. In the same year, Vespa found himself at the centre of a political scandal after a telephone conversation he had with Salvatore Sottile, spokesperson for politician Gianfranco Fini, concerning an upcoming episode of Porta a Porta. During the (intercepted) conversation, Vespa indicated that he would "custom-tailor" the program to suit Fini's needs, requesting, in fact, that the politician's aide select the chosen adversary for the scheduled face-to-face. Since the programme publicly prided itself on creating an unbiased turf for political confrontations, Vespa's integrity was called into question, going as far as to be discredited, due to his perceived "servitude" towards right-wing politicians, especially Berlusconi, and a tendency of asking softball questions on most of his shows. This has led to some in the Italian media establishment calling Vespa a "regime servant", most famously by now-deceased journalist Giorgio Bocca.

In February 2012, a photo of Italian troops who were killing Slovene civilians (as a retaliation because Tito's partisans killed Italian soldiers) was shown by the host Vespa on TV as if it were the other way round. When historian Alessandra Kersevan, who was a guest, pointed it out to Vespa that it is Slovenes in the photo who were killed and not vice versa, he did not apologise. A diplomatic protest followed.

Vespa is credited with having a position of strong allegiance towards Silvio Berlusconi.

He received the America Award of the Italy–USA Foundation in 2018.

== Awards ==
- 1978 – Premio Saint Vincent for television, awarded by President Sandro Pertini
- 1990 – European personality of the year for the category of journalism
- 1992 – Premio La Madonnina for journalism
- 1995 – Premio Guidarello for journalism
- 1997 – Telegatto for career achievements
- 1999 – Ischia International Journalism Award, for TV journalism
- 1999 – Telegatto for best culture show
- 2000 – Premio Saint Vincent for television, awarded by President Carlo Azeglio Ciampi
- 2002 – Telegatto for best talk show
- 2004 – Premio Bancarella
- 2006 – Telegatto (platinum)
- 2008 – Big Brother Awards
- 2008 – Premio Regia Televisiva

== Published works ==
All Vespa's books were published by Arnoldo Mondadori Editore.

- Uno stadio per Tommaso Fattori (1966)
- Abruzzo aperto (1974)
- A sessant'anni dalla rivoluzione d'ottobre. Speciale TG1 (1977)
- ...E anche Leone votò Pertini. Cronaca di un settennato incompiuto, di una crisi e di una elezione presidenziale (1978)
- Flash 79 (1980)
- Visita di sua santità Giovanni Paolo II al traforo del Gran Sasso (1980)
- Intervista sul socialismo in Europa (1980)
- Flash 1980 (1981)
- Italia/Libano. Storia di una spedizione di pace attraverso le testimonianze di corrispondenti giornalistici (1983)
- Ping pong (1983)
- Marsica 1915 (1984)
- Abruzzo Abruzzi (1986)
- Friuli-Venezia Giulia. Da un secolo all'altro (1988)
- Paesi del Gran Sasso (1989)
- Veneto. La rinascita (1989)
- Telecamera con vista. Da Valpreda a Di Pietro, 25 anni di storia italiana nei retroscena del Telegiornale (1993)
- Il cambio. Uomini e retroscena della nuova repubblica (1994, 1996)
- Il duello. Chi vincerà nello scontro finale (1995)
- Il duello. Storia dello scontro finale (1996)
- La svolta. Il pendolo del potere da destra a sinistra (1996)
- Il Papa eremita. Celestino V e la perdonanza all'Aquila (1996)
- La sfida. Dal patto alla crisi e oltre (1997)
- La corsa. Dopo D'Alema a palazzo Chigi chi salirà al Quirinale? (1998)
- La corsa. La lunga strada del presidente Ciampi (1999)
- Dieci anni che hanno sconvolto l'Italia. 1989-2000 (1999)
- Il superpresidente. Che cosa cambia in Italia con Ciampi al Quirinale (1999)
- Scontro finale. Chi vincerà l'ultimo duello (2000)
- Scontro finale. Ultimo atto (2001)
- Scontro finale. Chi vincera l'ultimo duello (2001)
- Verdi e l'Arena (2001)
- La scossa. Il cambiamento italiano nel mondo che trema (2001)
- L'opera, il mito. 80 anni di spettacoli all'Arena di Verona (2002)
- Rai, la grande guerra. 1962-2002. Quarant'anni di battaglie a Viale Mazzini (2002)
- La Grande Muraglia. L'Italia di Berlusconi, l'Italia dei girotondi (2002)
- Il Cavaliere e il Professore. La scommessa di Berlusconi, il ritorno di Prodi (2003)
- Cinquant'anni. Il miracolo del Friuli. 1953-2003 premio del lavoro e del progresso economico (2003)
- Storia d'Italia da Mussolini a Berlusconi. 1943: l'arresto del duce, 2005: la sfida di Prodi (2004)
- Vincitori e vinti. Le stagioni dell'odio. Dalle leggi razziali a Prodi e Berlusconi (2005)
- La sfida cinese (2005)
- L'Italia spezzata. Un paese a metà tra Prodi e Berlusconi (2006)
- L'amore e il potere. Da Rachele a Veronica, un secolo di storia italiana (2007)
- Viaggio in un'Italia diversa (2008)
- Italiani voltagabbana. Dalla prima guerra mondiale alla Terza Repubblica (2014)
- Donne d'Italia. Da Cleopatra a Maria Elena Boschi, storia del potere femminile (2015)
- Perché l’Italia amò Mussolini (2020)

Media offices
Preceded by —	Newscaster for TG1; 1968–1989	Succeeded by —
Preceded by Nuccio Fava	Editor in chief of TG1; 1989–1993	Succeeded by Albino Longhi
New title	Host of Porta a Porta since 1996	Incumbent
