= Porta a Porta =

Italian late night television talk show

- Genre: Talk show
- Presented by: Bruno Vespa
- Country of origin: Italy
- Original language: Italian
- No. of seasons: 31
- No. of episodes: 3,674 (04 June 26)

Production
- Running time: 95 minutes

Original release
- Network: Rai 1
- Release: January 22, 1996 – present

Porta a Porta (lit. 'Door-to-door') is an Italian late night television talk show hosted by the Italian journalist Bruno Vespa and is broadcast on Rai Uno since 1996, lasting 31 seasons. Its first episode aired on January 22, 1996. The show airs on Tuesdays, Wednesdays and Thursdays.

== Scheduling and format ==
The formula and placement of the program within the schedule have remained unchanged over the years, while the number of evenings has changed. In the first season the program dealt exclusively with politics and was broadcast two evenings a week (Monday and Thursday) alternating with the weekly costume program Cliché hosted by Carmen Lasorella, broadcast on Wednesdays. From season 2, Cliché was cancelled, Porta a Porta expands its range of action by also dealing with customs and society, and increases the episodes from two to four, airing from Monday to Thursday. Later the evenings were reduced from four to three a week; first from Monday to Wednesday, and then from Tuesday to Thursday. Each episode sees politicians, experts, television personalities and news protagonists called to discuss one or more issues. Guests enter the studio one at a time passing through a door opened by an employee who acts as a butler, played by the actor Paolo Baroni. At the beginning, the director was Marco Aleotti, who was replaced by Sabrina Busiello starting from 2019, while among the authors there were Giuseppe Breveglieri and Marco Zavattini from the first episode until their deaths, which occurred in 2004 and 2023 respectively.

Over the years, due to its centrality in the Italian political scene, Porta a Porta has been defined as the third Chamber of State. The program's theme song, rearranged over the years, is the soundtrack to the film Via col vento.

Together with the Maurizio Costanzo Show, it is considered one of the television programs that have most made the history of late evening entertainment in Italy. The program is still one of the most followed today despite its broadcast time.

In the autumn of 2011 the program has a cycle of weekly appointments broadcast in prime time on Wednesdays entitled PrimaSerata Porta a Porta.

From 10 to 16 March 2020 the program was not broadcast following the COVID-19 emergency in Italy.

== Seasons ==
Seasons
| Season | Start | End |
|---|---|---|
| 26 | September 8, 2020 | June 6, 2021 |
| 27 | September 14, 2021 | June 29, 2022 |
| 28 | August 30, 2022 | June 29, 2023 |
| 29 | September 13, 2023 | June 13, 2024 |
