= Trachtenberg =

Trachtenberg is a German language name that is also used in other language societies.

== About Trachtenberg as surname ==
(Russian/Ukrainian: Трахтенберг, Yiddish: טראַכֿטנבערג; Hebrew: טרכטנברג, is a surname of several notable people, typically an Ashkenazi Jewish surname, especially Bessarabian and Ukrainian. Sometimes the name is transliterated to Trachtenburg, whilst Jews from Argentina often spell the name Trajtenberg according to Spanish spelling norms. Some more recent immigrants from the former Soviet Union have had the name transliterated as Trakhtenberg when entering the US.

Trachtenberg, literally "a mountain of costumes" (in German), or "a mountain of thoughts" (in Yiddish), is a modification of the former German name of a town in Silesia (Trachenberg "Dragon Castle") now called by the Polish name Żmigród, where Jews were a significant part of the population until World War II and the Holocaust. Jews who bear this name are usually descendants of families who moved from Trachtenburg, Silesia, to another place in central or eastern Europe (and then elsewhere, later on). They became known in their new communities by their former place of residence.

== List of people with the surname Trachtenberg ==
- Alan Trachtenberg (1932–2020), scholar of American Studies
- Alexander Trachtenberg (1884–1966), Marxist founder of International Publishers (NYC)
- Betty Glassman Trachtenberg (1933–2023), American college administrator
- Dan Trachtenberg (born 1981), American director
- Deborah Trachtenberg, American journalist and television personality
- Herman Trachtenberg (1839–1895), Ukrainian-Jewish jurist
- Isaac Trachtenberg (1923–2023), Ukrainian hygienist and professor
- Jakow Trachtenberg (1888–1953), Ukrainian-Jewish inventor of the Trachtenberg system of rapid mental arithmetic
- Joshua Trachtenberg (1904–1959), American rabbi and scholar of Jewish history
- Marc Trachtenberg (born 1946), American historian
- Michelle Trachtenberg (1985–2025), American actress
- Stephen Joel Trachtenberg (born 1937), former president of George Washington University
- Yeshayahu Trachtenberg, better known as Shaike Dan (1909-1994), Israeli parachutist and Aliyah Bet activist

== List of people with alternative spellings ==
- Jason Trachtenburg, American musician
- Rachel Trachtenburg (born 1993), American musician
- Tina Trachtenburg, better known as Mother Pigeon, American street performance artist
- Roman Trakhtenberg (1968–2009), Russian radio host and actor
- Manuel Trajtenberg (born 1950), Israeli economist
- Gabriel Trajtenberg (1964-2023) Argentinian Sociologist and philanthropist. founder of Hillel in Argentina.

== Alternative spellings ==
- Trakhtenberg
- Trachtenburg
- Drachenberg
- Trachenberg, German name of Żmigród, Poland
