= Caldwell Tanks =

American tank manufacturer

- Company type: Privately held
- Founded: 1887
- Founder: William E. Caldwell
- Headquarters: 4000 Tower Rd; Louisville, KY 40219
- Area served: Worldwide
- Key people: K. Ryan Harvey (CEO)
- Products: Industrial Storage Tanks; ASME Vessels; Elevated Storage Tanks; Ground Storage Tanks; Turbine Inlet Cooling Systems
- Number of employees: 500
- Website: caldwelltanks.com

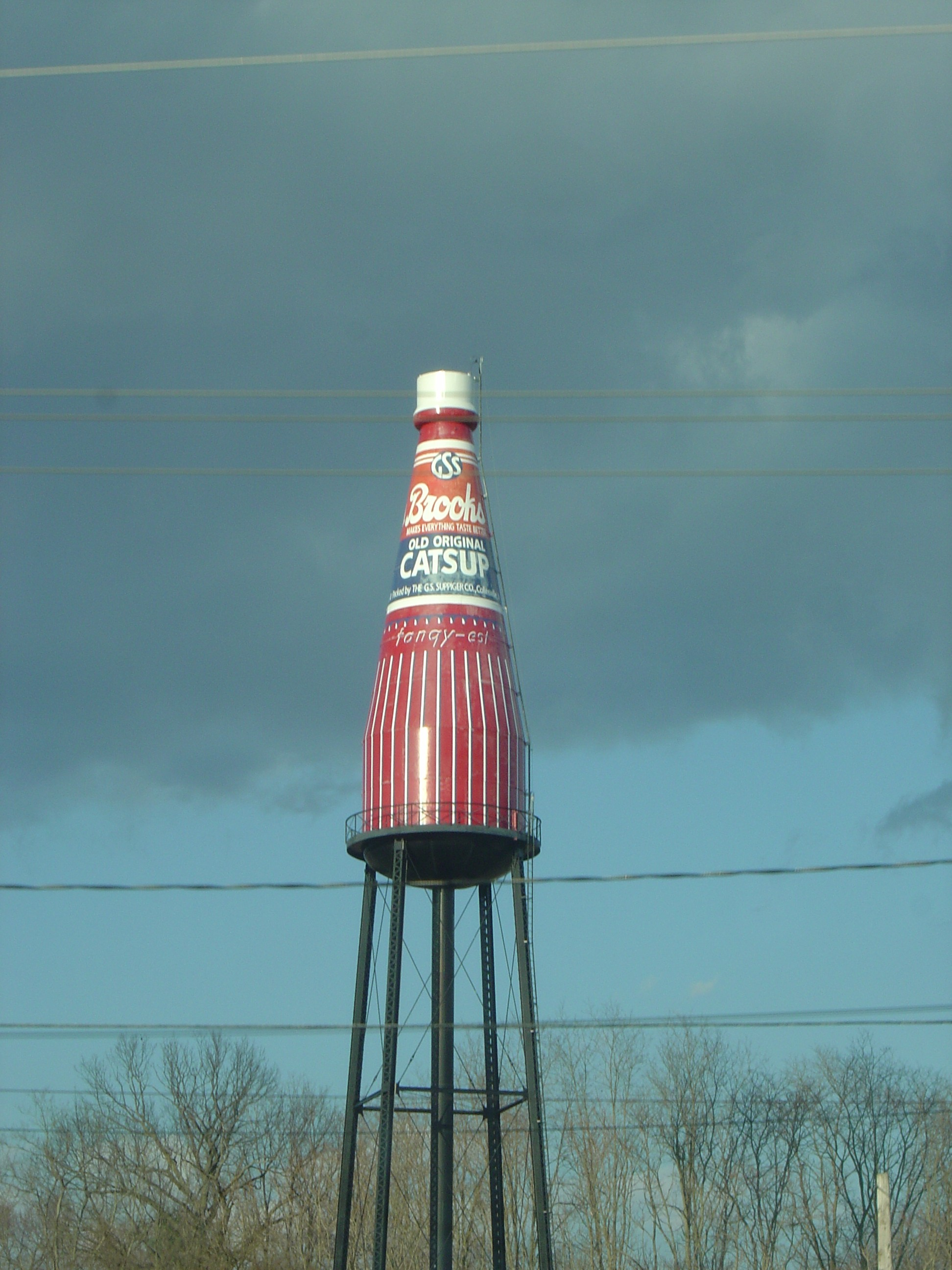
Brooks Catsup Bottle Water Tower, "The World's Largest Ketchup Bottle", built by Caldwell Tanks in 1949.

Caldwell Tanks is a large privately held company that designs, fabricates, and builds tanks for the water, wastewater, grain, coal and energy industries. Caldwell is the largest elevated tank company in the world. Caldwell has approximately 500 total employees with 206 employees in Louisville at its 20-acre (81,000 m^{2}) headquarters campus. Caldwell has two major facilities: fabrication facilities in Louisville, Kentucky, and Newnan, Georgia.

== Operating divisions ==
- Caldwell Tanks - Constructs customized elevated and ground level potable water storage tanks
- Industrial API Tanks and ASME Vessels - Industrial field-erected projects in industries such as oil, gas, midstream and chemical.
- Caldwell Energy - Established in 1995, Caldwell Energy provides Turbine Inlet Air-Cooling (TIC) systems

== History ==
Caldwell Tanks was founded in 1887 by William E. Caldwell. The company was originally known as W.E. Caldwell Co. The firm remained in the Caldwell family until 1986 when it was purchased by James W. Robinson. Robinson appointed a former banker, Bernard S. Fineman, to be president of Caldwell.

The W.E. Caldwell Company headquarters was originally located on what is now part of the campus of the University of Louisville. The university's Red Barn multi-purpose activities facility is a remaining building of the original Caldwell Tanks complex. The university purchased the facility from Caldwell in 1969.

In April 2011, Caldwell Tanks completed a 16,000-square-foot (1,500 m^{2}) expansion of its headquarters in Louisville. The expanded space doubled the office space at its Louisville headquarters, adding additional offices, conference rooms, and file-storage rooms. Caldwell also announced plans for a 24,000-square-foot (2,200 m^{2}) addition to its 180,000-square-foot (17,000 m^{2}) production facility.

== Notable projects ==
- Earffel Tower - Caldwell's most widely recognized installation was the Earffel (or Earful) Tower, located at Disney's Hollywood Studios theme park from 1989 to 2016. The tank won the Tank of the Year award in 1987 from the Steel Plate Fabricators Association.
- Solana Generating Station - Caldwell was awarded the contract to build 12 molten salt thermal energy storage tanks for the first large-scale solar plant in the United States capable of storing energy.
- Western Kentucky University water tower - In Fall 2004, Caldwell completed the new 2.5-million-US-gallon (9,500 m^{3}) water tank on the Western Kentucky campus. The 156-foot (48 m) landmark tank features WKU's mascot Big Red, and it was constructed at a cost of $1,662,000.
- Victory Junction Gang Camp - Caldwell completed a 140-foot (43 m) tall, 150,000-US-gallon (570,000 L) capacity hot air balloon styled tank for Kyle and Pattie Petty's Victory Junction Gang Camp.
- St. Charles County, Missouri Water District 2 - Caldwell was awarded the 2005 Steel Tank of the Year Award by the Steel Tank Institute / Steel Plate Fabricators Association (STI/SPFA) for an elevated tank completed in December 2005. The 180-foot (55 m) tall tank has a capacity of 3,000,000 US gallons (11,000,000 L) of water.
- South Carolina Electric & Gas Company - Caldwell Energy installed the world's largest central chilled plant dedicated to combustion turbine inlet air cooling at the Jasper Power Plant in Hardeeville, South Carolina
- Collinsville, Illinois - Caldwell completed the "World's Largest Ketchup Bottle" water tower for the G.S. Suppiger catsup bottling plant in 1949.
- Brown-Forman Distillery - Caldwell completed the Louisville distillery's Old Forester whiskey bottle tank in 1936.
- The Bottle District - Caldwell constructed the giant Vess bottle in St. Louis, Missouri in 1953.
- The "World's Largest Bat" - Caldwell fabricated and delivered the largest baseball bat in the world for Louisville Slugger Museum & Factory, standing at 120 ft. tall. and weighing 68,000 pounds.

== Use as a filming location ==
Caldwell's Newnan, Georgia facilities have been used as a filming location for films and television series. Portions of The Hunger Games: Mockingjay – Part 1 were filmed on the Caldwell Tanks property in December 2013 to January 2014. Portions of the AMC television series The Walking Dead have also been filmed at Caldwell's facilities in Newnan.

== See also ==
- Brooks Catsup Bottle Water Tower
