= Dinosaur (statue) =

Statue in New York City

- Dinosaur on view on the High Line in 2025.
- Artist: Iván Argote
- Year: 2024
- Medium: Cast aluminum
- Subject: Feral pigeon
- Dimensions: 487 x 243 x 304 cm 191 3/4 x 95 11/16 x 119 11/16 inch
- Weight: 2,000 lb (910 kg)
- Location: High Line, New York City

Dinosaur (2024) is a large, hyper-realistic cast-aluminum sculpture of a feral pigeon (an example of a feathered dinosaur), by Colombian artist Iván Argote, installed since October 2024 at New York City’s High Line, to remain on display until the Spring of 2026.

At 16 ft (4.9 metres) tall, the sculpture sits on a 5 ft (1.5 metres) concrete plinth located above 10th Avenue and 30th Street. As the fourth recipient of the High Line Plinth commission, Argote is the youngest artist to receive the Plinth commission and the first recipient from the Global South.

The sculpture measures approximately 20 ft (6.1 metres) in length and weighs close to 910 kilograms (2,000 pounds). With its large size and position above New York City’s streets, it intends to reverse the typical power dynamic between pigeon and human, celebrating a creature often considered a pest. Long concerned with challenging dominant political ideologies, Argote constructed Dinosaur to recast the idea of sculpture, a medium historically used to honor "great men, who all too often are neither honorable nor great." The sculpture was erected four years after its original proposal, in 2020, and has since become a prominent symbol of urban resilience and the oft-overlooked persistence of pigeons in man-made environments.

== Background ==
=== High Line Plinth ===
The High Line Plinth is a public art platform located on the Spur, the final section of New York City’s High Line park. Inaugurated in 2019 by Simone Leigh’s Brick House (2019), it is one of few public sites in the city exclusively dedicated to large-scale contemporary art commissions. With its rotating series of commissioned artworks, all remaining on display for 18-month periods, it provides a unique opportunity for artists to present massive works in an urban, hyper-visible setting.

While preceded by similar public art forums—notably, the Fourth Plinth in London, which began displaying commissioned artworks in 2005—the High Line Plinth is uniquely integrated into an urban linear park, and designed specifically for the display of hulking contemporary sculptures. From its vantage point at the intersection of 10th Avenue and 30th Street, the Plinth is visible from a variety of locations, including rooftops, the street, and other positions on the High Line itself. This centrality affords commission recipients a strong presence within their urban surroundings, becoming temporary fixtures within the New York City streetscape. Since its inception in 2019, the Plinth has showcased diverse artists and themes, inviting a dynamic relationship between the public and contemporary art.

=== Iván Argote ===
Iván Argote is a Colombian artist and filmmaker based in Paris. His performance pieces and installations use humor to challenge dominant political ideologies. Born in Bogotá, Colombia, in 1983, he was raised in a militant family that was heavily involved in the armed conflicts during La Violencia. These experiences influenced him to become a human rights activist. His work is heavily informed by an awareness of historical narratives and patterns. Argote is the youngest artist to receive the High Line Plinth commission, and the first from the Global South. While characteristically tender and light-hearted, his work serves to question our “intimate relationship with others, institutions, power, and belief systems.” Argote’s work can be found in the collections of major metropolitan museums including the Solomon R. Guggenheim Museum, Centre Pompidou, Centre national des arts plastiques, and MACBA.

== Description ==
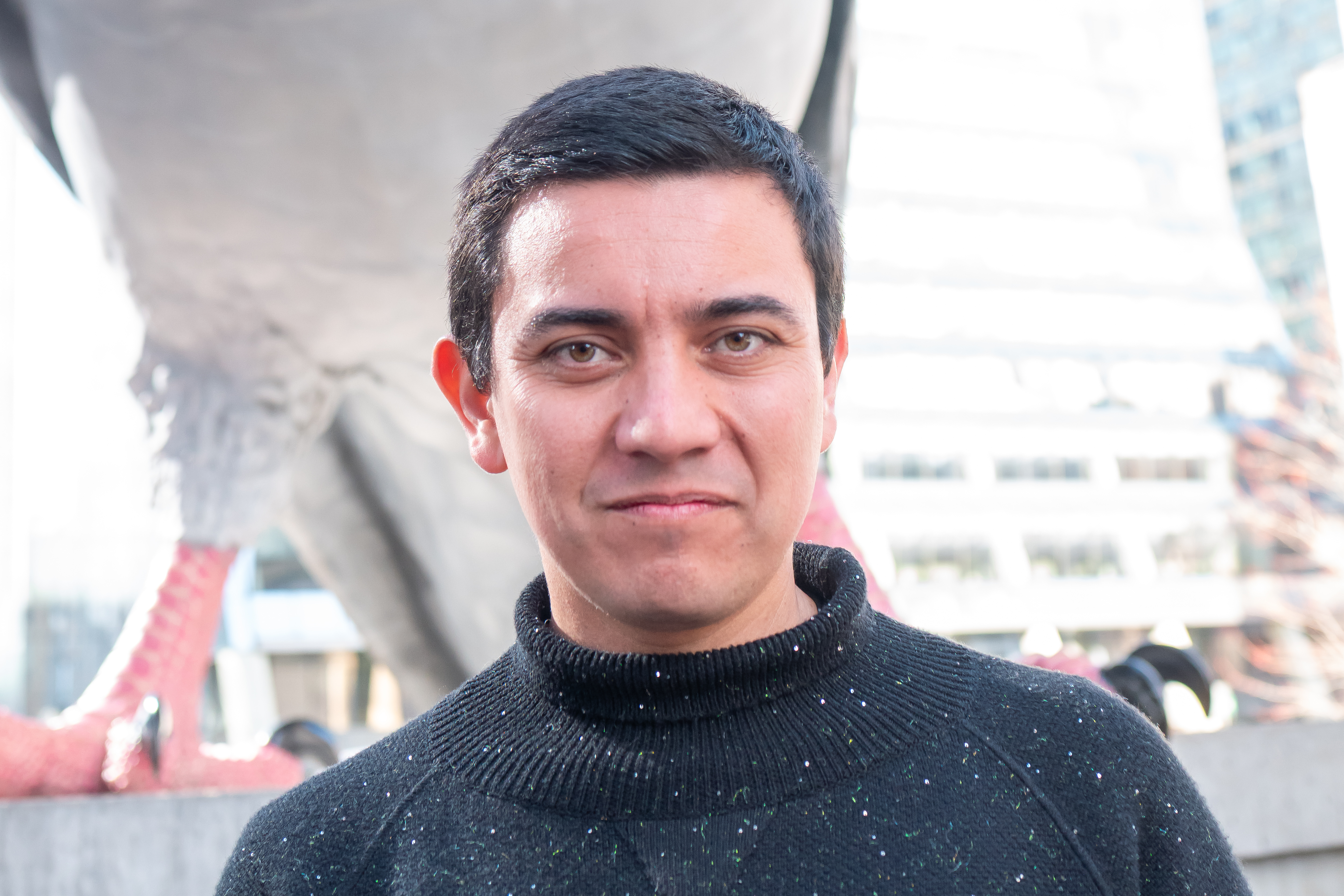
Argote in front of the statue

In 2020, Iván Argote submitted a proposal for Dinosaur to the High Line Plinth, joining 80 other candidates for the commission. It is the fourth artwork to receive the commission, following Simone Leigh’s Brick House (2019), Sam Durant’s Untitled (drone) (2021), and Pamela Rosenkranz’s Old Tree (2023). In October of 2024, Dinosaur debuted on the Plinth, where it will remain for 18 months, through the Spring of 2026. The sculpture stands at approximately 16 feet and sits on a concrete plinth that resembles New York City sidewalks. Argote has said that its title is a reference to its hulking size and the pigeon’s evolutionary ancestors, who "millions of years ago dominated the globe, as we humans do today." The sculpture has been described as a reversal of the power dynamic between birds and humans.

Dinosaur is a colossal, hyper-realistic sculpture of a pigeon cast in aluminum. It was meticulously hand-painted by Argote to recreate the intricate details of pigeons’ iconic plumage. The sculpture is 16 feet tall and elevated by the plinth to tower 21 total feet over the intersection of 10th Avenue and 30th Street. By representing and aggrandizing the pigeon, Argote sought to challenge conventional modes of sculpture, a medium typically reserved for historical human figures. For New York in particular, Dinosaur also served to subvert public perception of pigeons, as lowly, oft-derided "rats with wings." The city has long been home to sculptures of wildlife, from the Charging Bull on Wall Street to the marble lions of the New York Public Library. Argote’s Dinosaur hints toward a reconsideration of pigeons in relation to other, more well-respected urban creatures.

== Significance ==
While pigeons have famously resided in New York City for several centuries, their close proximity to humanity–relying on urban infrastructure for food and shelter—has gained them unpopularity among residents, who have historically complained of excrement and the potential spread of diseases. Beyond social hostility, the very infrastructure of New York City additionally makes life difficult for the species. Pigeon spikes are a common fixture on office structures and apartment complexes, and scholars have estimated that between 90,000 and 250,000 pigeons die from building collisions per year. The pigeon is an “icon of New York,” Argote wrote in a statement, but also a “marginal creature, living in dirty corners.”

Although pigeons have been derided by New York residents as vermin, a number of contemporary efforts have been made to vouch for their acceptance. An increasing number of efforts have been made to protest against the poaching of New York pigeons across state lines for pigeon shoots. Dinosaur inspired a June 2025 event called Pigeon Fest in which thousands of New Yorkers gathered to celebrate the statue and the city's pigeons. Mother Pigeon was among the featured performers.

== See also ==
- Doves as symbols
- Big Duck
- Dinah the Pink Dinosaur
- Pigeons in New York City
