= Brooks Catsup Bottle water tower =

Site in Collinsville, Illinois

- Brooks Catsup Bottle Water Tower
- U.S. National Register of Historic Places
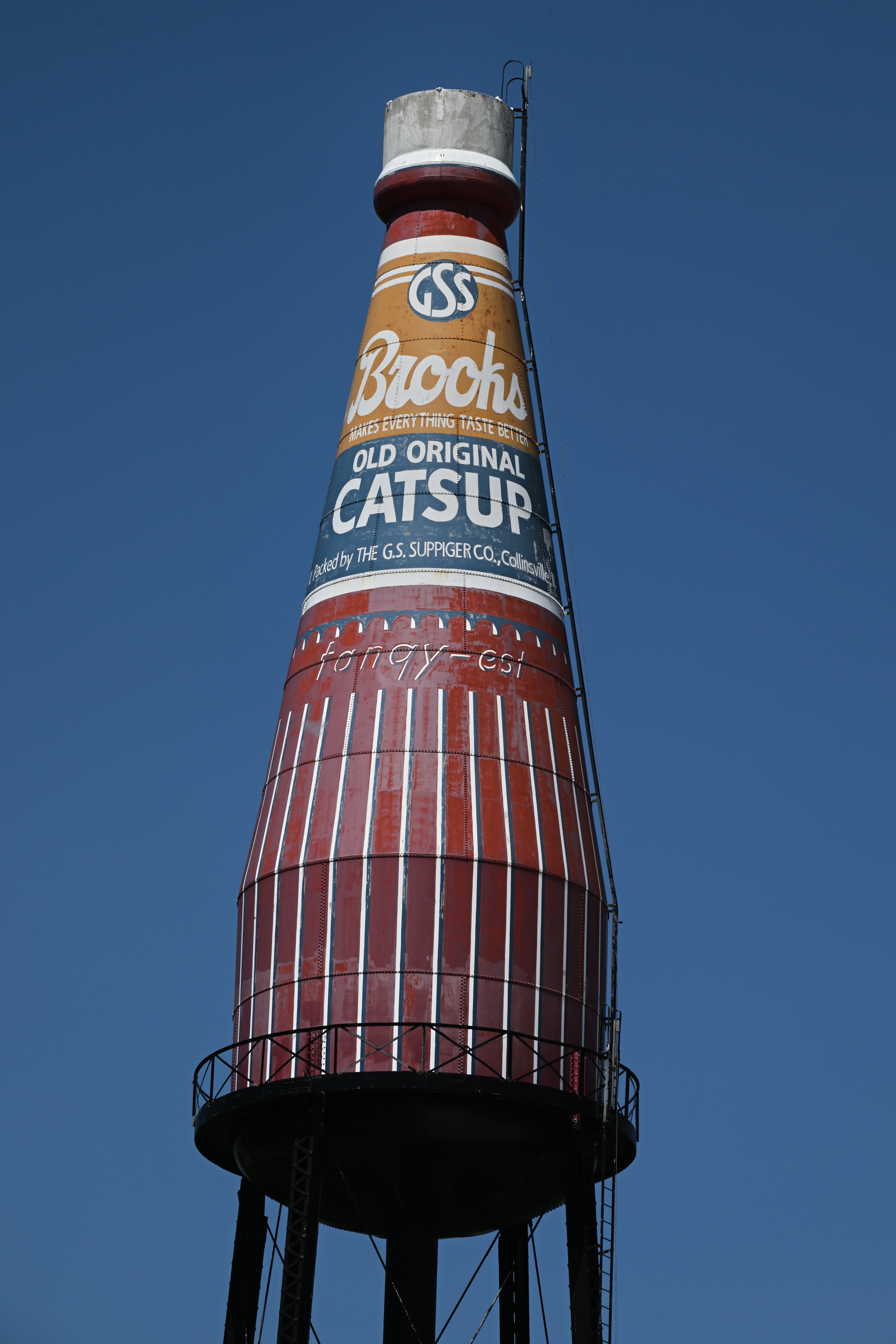
- Collinsville Water Tower in 2025

- Location within Illinois Location within the United States
- Location: Collinsville, Illinois
- Coordinates: 38°39′46.44″N 89°58′56.28″W
- Built: 1949
- Built by: W.E. Caldwell Company
- Restored: June 1995
- Restored by: Catsup Bottle Preservation Group
- Website: https://www.worldslargestcatsupbottle.com
- NRHP reference No.: 02000847
- Added to NRHP: 2002

The Brooks Catsup Bottle water tower, trademarked "The World's Largest Catsup Bottle", is a water tower on the south side of Collinsville, Illinois. It is claimed to be the largest catsup bottle in the world at 70 feet tall on a 100 foot stand with a volume of 100,000 gallons, which could theoretically hold 640,000 bottles of catsup. As a prime example of mid-20th-century novelty architecture, it is listed on the National Register of Historic Places. The tower is most notable in its capacity as a regional landmark and as a roadside attraction.

"The World's Largest Catsup Bottle" has an official page available to access.

== Construction ==
The water tower was constructed in 1949 by the W.E. Caldwell Company of Louisville, Kentucky. The tower was built to supply water to the nearby Brooks catsup plant owned by the G.S. Suppiger Company. The president of the company, Gerhart S. Suppiger, is credited with the suggestion that the water tower be designed to resemble one of the company's catsup bottles.

== Restoration ==
In 1993, the owners of the Brooks plant, Curtice-Burns, Inc., prepared to sell the property. It offered the water tower to the nearby city of Collinsville, but the city declined to purchase it due to the high projected cost of repairs and restoration. Over the course of two years, volunteers raised $80,000 to "repair, strip, and paint" the aging structure. The project was completed in June 1995, and the structure was added to the National Register of Historic Places in August 2002.

== In popular culture ==
The tower was featured in A Program About Unusual Buildings & Other Roadside Stuff, a 2004 PBS documentary by Rick Sebak of WQED.

It was mentioned as a place the character Bella should visit in The Twilight Saga: Eclipse.
