= A Program About Unusual Buildings & Other Roadside Stuff =

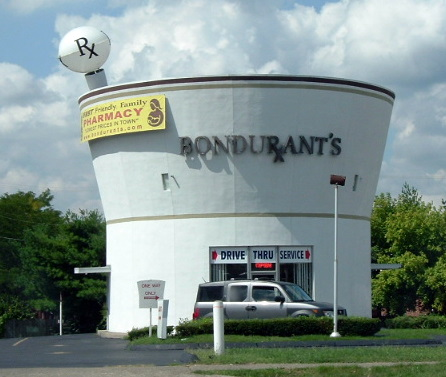
Bondurant's Pharmacy

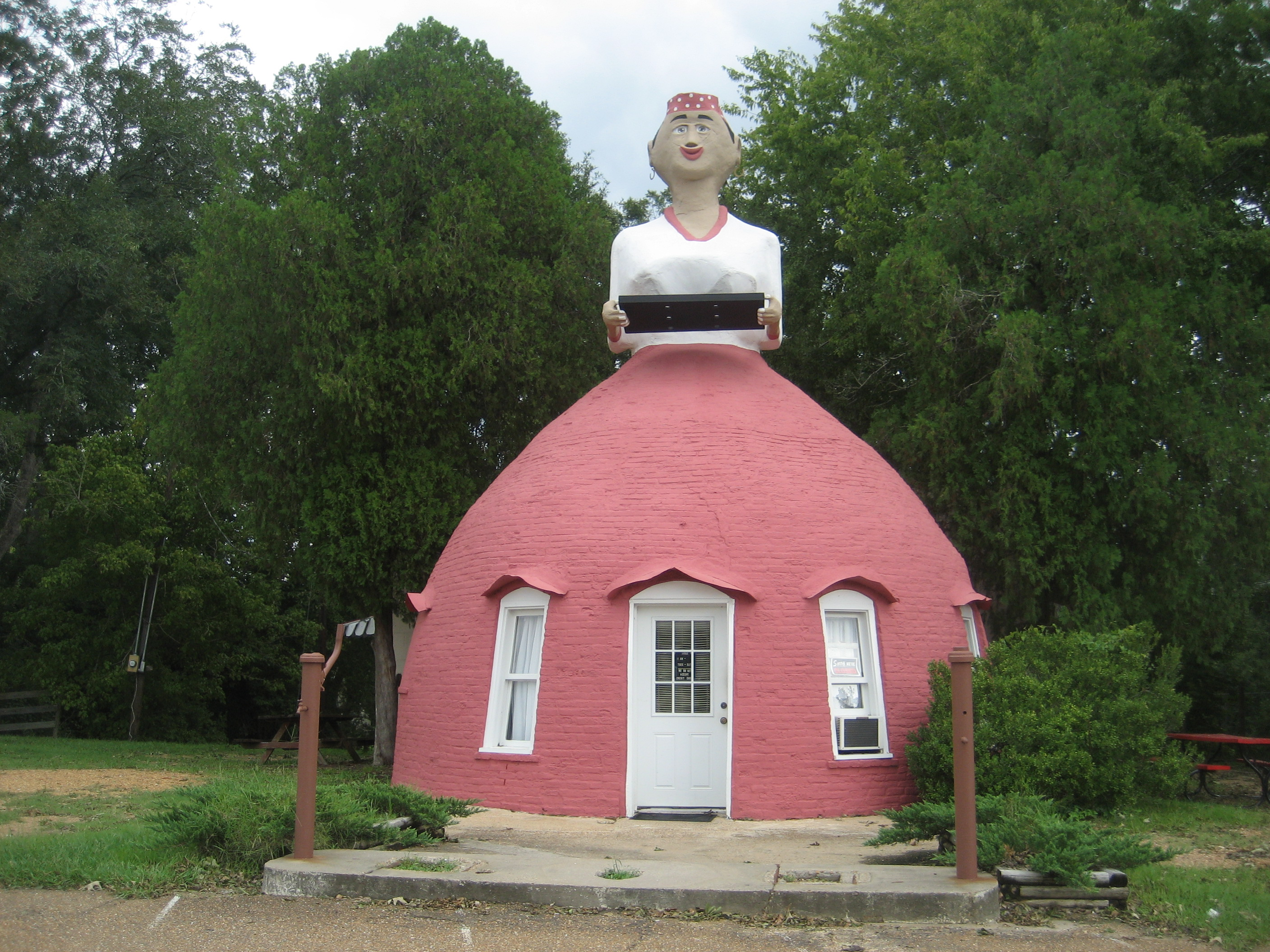
Mammy's Cupboard Restaurant

A Program About Unusual Buildings & Other Roadside Stuff is a 2004 PBS documentary by Rick Sebak of WQED. It showcases mimetic and novelty buildings across the United States.

Some of the architecture and buildings depicted in the documentary include:

- Haines Shoe House, Hallam, Pennsylvania — shoe
- Frates Bottle, New Bedford, Massachusetts — milk bottle
- Bondurant's Pharmacy, Lexington, Kentucky — mortar and pestle
- Wigwam Village #2, Cave City, Kentucky — teepees
- Tail O' the Pup, West Hollywood, California — hot dog
- Brooks Catsup Bottle Water Tower, Collinsville, Illinois — ketchup bottle
- Clam Box, Ipswich, Massachusetts — clam box
- Stacey family private house, Hazard, Kentucky — goose
- National Fresh Water Fishing Hall of Fame & Museum, Hayward, Wisconsin — muskie
- Orange World, Kissimmee, Florida — orange
- WonderWorks, Orlando, Florida — upside-down
- Corn Palace, Mitchell, South Dakota — corn-covered
- Mammy's Cupboard, Natchez, Mississippi — mammy
- Big Duck, Hampton Bays, New York — duck

== See also ==
- List of world's largest roadside attractions
