= Gabibbo =

Mascot for the Italian Mediaset-controlled channel Canale 5

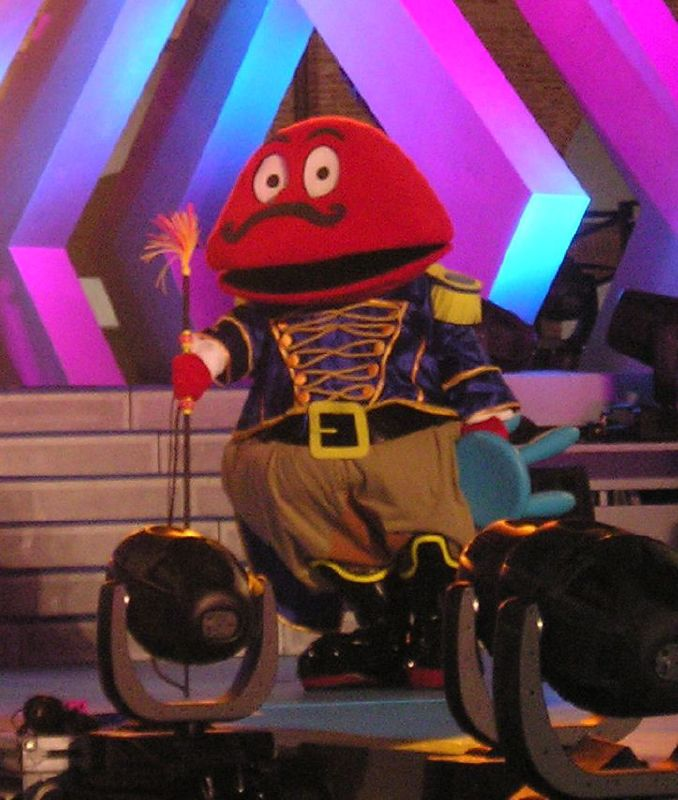
The Gabibbo

Gabibbo was the italian mascot for the Mediaset-controlled channel Canale 5 created in 1990. Gabibbo's main role has been in the programs Paperissima and Striscia la notizia, but he has appeared in several other Canale 5 programs. He is normally a jovial character known for his ability to make wisecracks and his overall humble demeanor. He speaks Italian with a Genoese accent, occasionally using Italianized Genoese words. In fact the word Gabibbo or Gabibbu [ɡaˈbibbu] belongs to the Genoese language and it is used to indicate, in an ironic-depreciative way, an immigrant from southern or even central Italy (it may originate from the Arab word habib).

== Western Kentucky Hilltoppers lawsuit ==
Gabibbo has also earned negative press surrounding a lawsuit brought by Western Kentucky University who claim that Gabibbo is an exact copy of their mascot Big Red. Western Kentucky claims it has a case because in an interview with Novella 2000, Ricci states that he created Gabibbo after seeing Western Kentucky's mascot, further adding that Gabibbo is in fact, "(an imported) Big Red".

Ricci claims he was joking in that interview, saying that he made the remark after Novella pointed out the similarities between Big Red and Gabibbo. He goes on to say that there are "100 different mascots who look like Gabibbo", not just Big Red, adding that the Sesame Street mascots Cookie Monster and Elmo also look like Gabibbo. However, Gabibbo's head is almost an exact copy of Big Red's (a fact repeated by The New York Times' business section, who quip that Gabibbo is simply a "better dressed" version of Big Red) and that Big Red debuted in 1979, almost eleven years prior to Gabibbo.

On 12 December 2007, Gabibbo and Antonio Ricci were found to not be liable for infringement by the court of appeals in Milan. On June 7, 2018, the decision was overruled and remanded by the Italian Supreme Court.
