= Brick House (Leigh) =

Sculpture by Simone Leigh

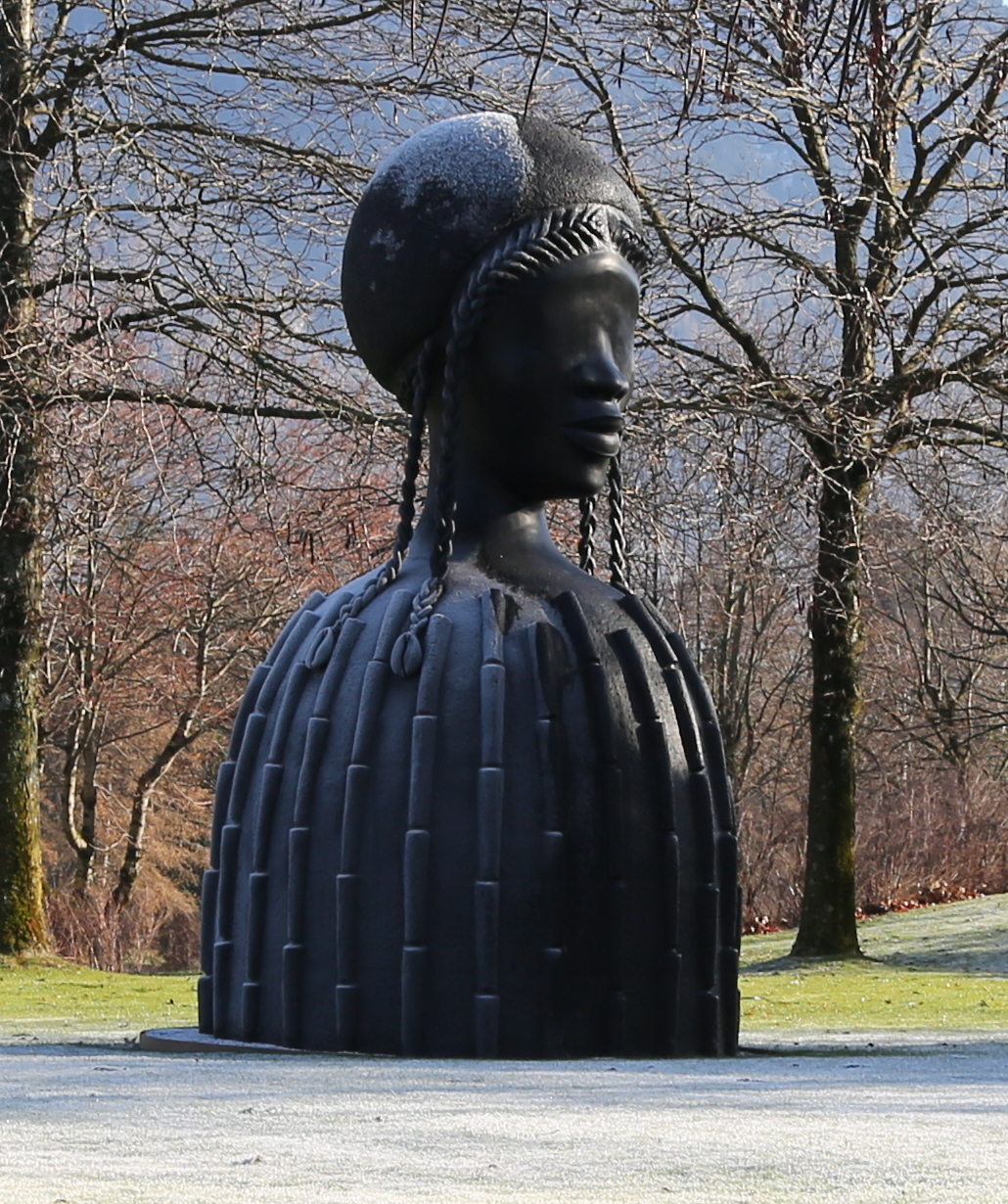
- Brick House in Bad Ragaz, Switzerland
- Artist: Simone Leigh
- Year: 2019
- Medium: Bronze sculpture
- Subject: Black woman
- Dimensions: 490 cm (16 ft); 270 cm diameter (9 ft)(at the base)
- Weight: 5,900 pounds (2,700 kg)
- Location: University of Pennsylvania, Philadelphia

Brick House is a 16-foot (4.9 m) tall bronze bust of a black woman by Simone Leigh, installed along New York City's High Line from 2019 to 2021. Another edition of the sculpture was acquired by the University of Pennsylvania and installed at the campus' main entrance in November 2020. This statue is the first sculpture in Simone Leigh’s Anatomy of Architecture series, which combines architectural forms from varied regions with elements of the human body.

The sculpture's head is crowned with an afro framed by two asymmetric cornrow braids that each end in a cowrie shell. Meanwhile, the torso of the sculpture, 9 feet (2.7 m) in diameter, combines the form of a skirt with a clay house based on architectural styles from Africa and the southern United States. While the sculpture has traditionally Black features, it lacks a pair of eyes, which allows the identity of the sculpture to remain ambiguous so that it cannot be attached to one specific Black individual or group.

The statue, which weighs 5,900 pounds (2,700 kg), was the inaugural commission for New York City's High Line Plinth and was installed in the fall of 2019. At that time, there were only a handful of monuments to Black individuals in New York City; and only one of these depicted a woman (Alison Saar's Swing Low sculpture of Harriet Tubman in Harlem).

== Influential architecture styles ==
Brick House is based on architectural styles from West African cultures, specifically the Batammaliba and the Mousgoum, in addition to Mammy's Cupboard in the Southern United States.

=== Batammaliba ===
The Batammaliba are an Oti–Volta-speaking people in Benin and neighboring Togo. The name Batammariba (or Batammaliba) means "those who are the real architects of the earth”; they place a strong emphasis on the interconnectedness of architecture, humans, and their environment. This interconnectedness shapes the design and functionality of their buildings. Buildings are treated as members of one's family. Drinks are spilled on the threshold or “mouth” of the home so it can drink, while the same colorful clothes that the people wear during ceremonies and rituals cover its walls. Thus their structures are fully personified. The name of Leigh's sculpture refers to a strong Black woman who stands with strength, endurance, and integrity, like a house constructed of bricks. Therefore, the sculpture serves as the embodiment of feminine power amid a patriarchal society demanding viewers to apply a sense of respect and dignity to the female body and the Black female body as a prominent figure in the urban landscape. In Brick House, Leigh also draws on Batammaliba culture by using cowrie shells on the sculpture's head. These are a nod toward the Batammalibian priests' sacred geomancy shells among other allusions.

=== Mousgoum ===
The Mousgoum or Mulwi are a Chadir ethnic group in Cameroon and Chad. Their dwellings, called Teleuks, are traditionally dome-shaped buildings made from a mixture of soil, grass, and animal dung. For the torso of Brick House, Leigh replicated the Teleuk shape and utilized sponges and steel wool to mimic the texture of the dwellings. Throughout history, the notion of the hut has been used as a form of oppression to degrade Black individuals and reduce them to colonialist tropes of "uncivilized savages". However, Leigh's use of the hut shape places this typically oppressive architecture in a modern space to redefine what it means to be perceived as Black in current society.

=== Mammy's Cupboard ===
Mammy's Cupboard is a roadside restaurant along US Highway 61 south in Natchez, Mississippi. The 28 feet (8.5 m) tall restaurant is shaped like a woman wearing a round skirt, which houses a dining room and a gift shop. Her hands hold a serving tray, which further perpetuates the mammy archetype. The restaurant serves makes the Black woman's form a symbol of the labor she provides.

== Sculpting process ==
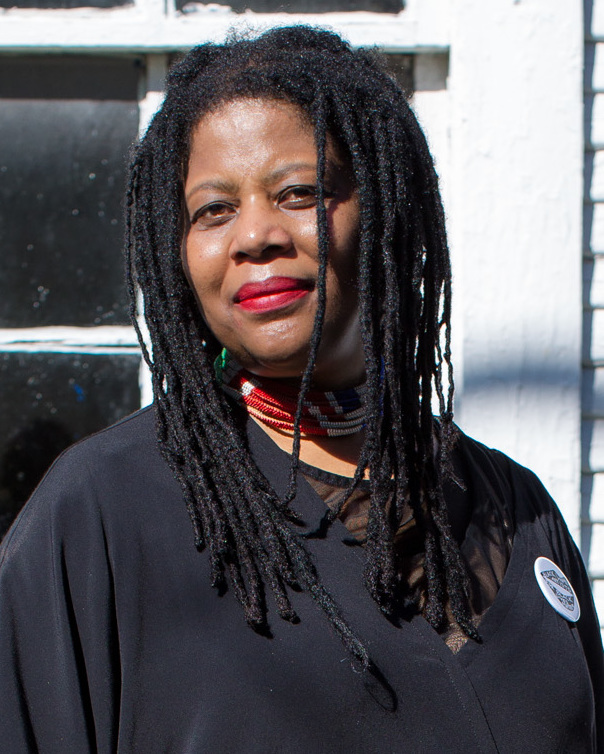
Simone Leigh

Brick House began as a ceramic maquette in Leigh's Brooklyn studio. The maquette was then used to create a 3D digital model for planning, visualizing, and a reference for the full-scale sculpture. After proportions were decided, 2 tons (1.8 t) of modeling clay were mounted onto an armature in Leigh's studio to begin sculpting. The clay was taken from a French quarry which is said to be where Auguste Rodin is believed to have acquired his clays. A team of sculptors worked on the form while Leigh oversaw the shapes and textures of the different elements.

Once the clay model was complete, Leigh selected Stratton Studio in Philadelphia as the fabrication site, in view of its experience and expertise in sculpting and casting large-scale bronze sculptures. Typically, for sculptures of this size, the studio uses a smaller maquette to be reproduced as a full-scale foam model from which the model is made. However, Leigh was concerned that the computer-generated foam reproduction would lose the personal touches; so instead the studio team made a plaster mold fabricated in 100 separate sheets to produce a wax positive. The cast was then dipped 20 or more times into a ceramic slurry to form the molds into which 6,000 pounds (2.7 t) of bronze, melted in a crucible, were poured, 400 pounds (180 kg) at a time. These bronze blocks were sand blasted, fitted, and welded together to form the final sculpture.

=== Design changes ===
In the earlier maquette, made for the 2017 High Line Plinth proposal, Leigh had originally planned to cover the head in sculpted roses made of porcelain, a recurring medium in her work. However, to make these flowers by hand to the scale required would have been too challenging and time-consuming. Thus Leigh and her team rethought the architecture and redesigned the sculpture's head to better fit its aesthetics and timeline. This resulted in the sculpture receiving a textured afro and asymmetric cornrow braids inspired by Thelma, the daughter in the popular 1970s TV show Good Times.

== Locations ==
=== High Line ===
Brick House was placed on New York City's High Line, a public park built on a historic elevated railroad on the West Side of Manhattan.

High Line Plinth is on the Spur, the last remaining section of the original railroad structure, at the intersections of 30th Street and 10th Ave on Manhattan's West Side. The Plinth is the first space on the High Line and one of the few spaces in New York City dedicated solely to a rotating series of new, monumental contemporary art commissions. Each commission is set to remain on view at the Plinth for 18 months.

=== University of Pennsylvania ===
Another original of the Brick House sculpture stands at the gateway to College Green on the University of Pennsylvania campus. This was installed on the campus in alignment with the university's commitment to confronting racial injustice.

The sculpture was gifted to the university by two alumni, Glenn and Amanda Fuhrman. “We first encountered Simone’s work in 2016 and immediately felt an almost visceral sense of both its historical resonance and incredible connection to our contemporary reality,” said Mrs. Fuhrman. “Because we were aware that Simone felt strongly about having this particular work reside on a university campus, we advocated for bringing it to Penn.”

Brick House was transported to the university on a flatbed truck and hoisted into place by crane onto a specifically constructed concrete platform.

=== 59th Venice Biennale (2022) ===
Brick House appeared in the Biennale's main exhibition Milk of Dreams, and Leigh earned a Golden Lion for the work.
