= Mother Pigeon =

American performance artist

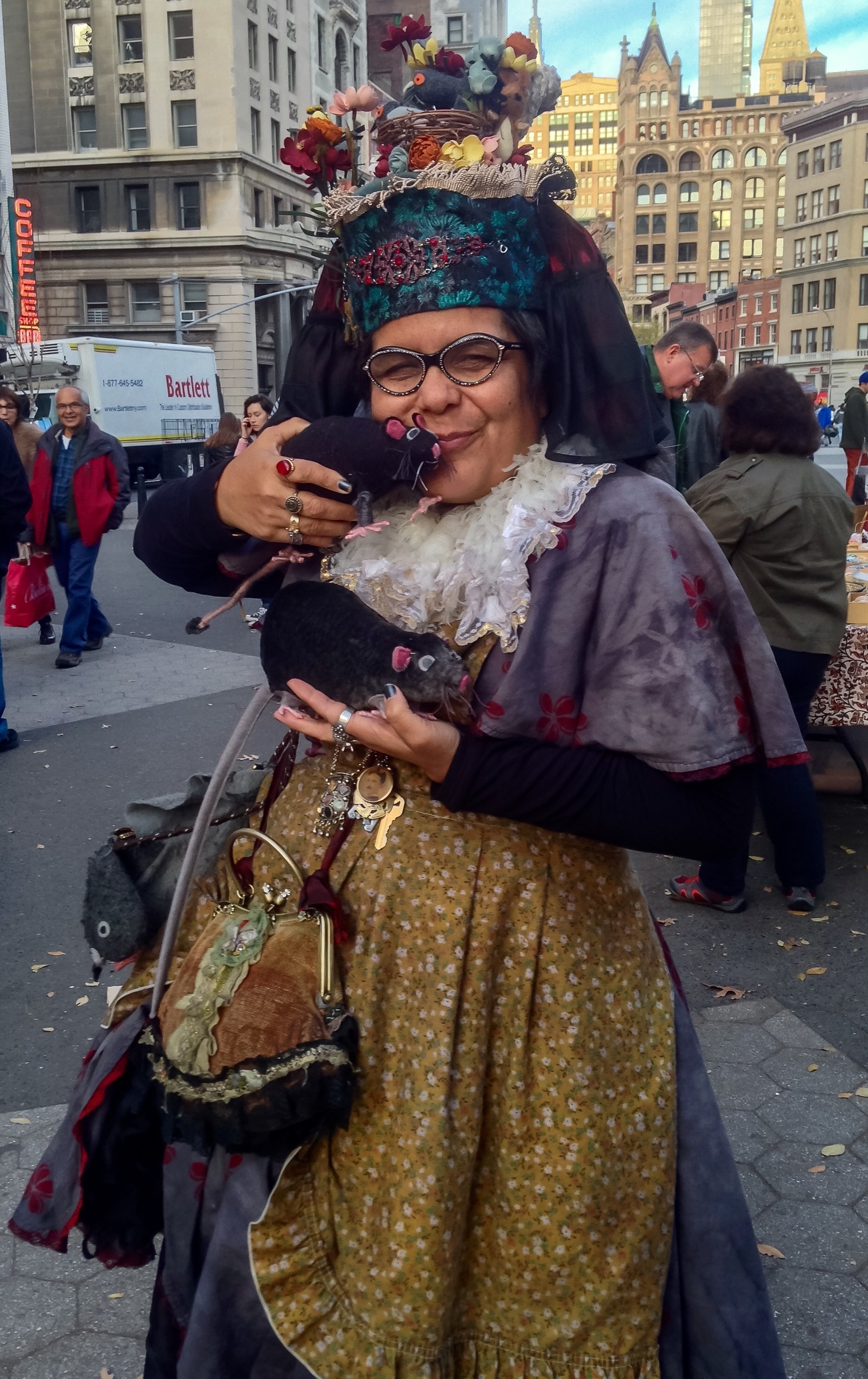
- Mother Pigeon in 2015
- Born: Tina Piña
- Spouse: Jason Trachtenburg (m. 1989-present)
- Children: Rachel Trachtenburg

Tina Trachtenburg (née Piña), known by her stage name Mother Pigeon, is an American street performance artist in New York City. In a typical show, she arranges an art installation of handmade soft sculptures representing pigeons and other urban wildlife while she sits among them. The goal of her art is both for entertainment and to promote animal rights for feral pigeons, rats in New York City, and other urban animals. Her exhibitions are intended to improve the reputations of animals who are "maligned" and "overlooked". Her pigeon sculptures are lifelike in appearance.

She is from San Antonio, Texas. Before becoming a solo street performer and activist, Mother Pigeon was a member of the Trachtenburg Family Slideshow Players, a self-described "indie-vaudeville-conceptual-art rock" band that consisted of Mother Pigeon's husband, Jason, and their only child Rachel, who is a musician, model and actress. Mother Pigeon performed at Pigeon Fest, a June 2025 festival in New York City inspired by the Dinosaur statue.

Mother Pigeon lives in Bushwick, Brooklyn.

== See also ==
- Pigeons in New York City
