= Great Old Amusement Parks =

1999 television documentary

- Created by: Rick Sebak
- Starring: Rick Sebak
- Country of origin: United States
- No. of seasons: 1

Production
- Running time: 60 minutes
- Production company: WQED

Original release
- Network: PBS

Great Old Amusement Parks is a 1999 PBS television documentary produced for VHS and DVD produced by Rick Sebak of WQED Pittsburgh which aired on PBS, on July 21, 1999.

Traditional amusement parks are presented by discussing their origins. Unique rides for each park are profiled such as the oldest surviving roller coaster, and the only surviving Noah's Ark walk-through attraction. Most parks are family owned and are interviewed along with each park's attendees. Subjects include Connecticut's Lake Compounce, California's Santa Cruz Beach Boardwalk, Whalom Park in Massachusetts, Pennsylvania's Idlewild Park and StoryBook Forest, Kennywood's Thunderbolt, Deno's Wonder Wheel at Coney Island and San Diego's Giant Dipper, where a local radio station held a Roller Coaster Riding Contest.

Not covered here are vintage "traditional" amusement parks no longer with us. Having aired in 1999, the program has not been updated to indicate if the parks are still around, although most are.

Rick Sebak is known for producing local interest documentaries for the Pittsburgh area with a heavy emphasis on food. This is one of four documentaries he produced of that has been shown throughout the PBS network.
