= Pennsylvania Diners and Other Roadside Restaurants =

1993 documentary television program

Pennsylvania Diners & Other Roadside Restaurants is a 1993 documentary created by Rick Sebak. The program originated in a 1992 item in The Pennsylvania Road Show about Lee's Diner. It was to be called "Pennsylvania Diners" but added "Other Roadside Restaurants" to cover other establishments than diners. When it was released on DVD in 2006, additional stories not seen nationally were included.

== Reception ==
In 1994 the show was nominated to the Mid-Atlantic Emmy Award Competition, for "Outstanding Cultural Programming". David Dillon, the architecture critic from The Dallas Morning News reviewed the show describing it as "amiable, if somewhat plodding".

== See also ==
- Pittsburgh A To Z
