= A Hot Dog Program =

1996 American documentary film

A Hot Dog Program is a 1996 documentary film which explores the history, food culture, and regional variety of hot dogs in the United States of America. It was produced, directed, and narrated by Rick Sebak. It premiered on PBS on June 30, 1996.
