= Pittsburgh A to Z =

Pittsburgh A To Z is a 2001 documentary created by Rick Sebak about 26 things about the City of Pittsburgh for every letter of the alphabet. Sebak included a larger area than just the city. In addition to the city, they include Somerset County, Fayette County, and Lawrence County. They had no rules about what to include. However, double usage of any letter gave it an added attraction. They skipped the letter H because the historic spelling of Pittsburgh did not include an H during a period of 20 years.

== Letters of the alphabet ==
- Arrowheads and Archaeology
- Braddock
- Confluences
- Dormont and Daguerreotype
- Evergreen Hamlet
- Fish Sandwiches
- Grant Streets
- Islands
- Historic Spelling of Pittsburgh
- Jeeps
- Kentuck Knob
- Thomas Lipinski
- Mancini's
- Night Talk
- Opera
- Plenty of Possibilities
- Robert Qualters (Painter)
- Rail Trail
- Soldiers & Sailors
- Tailgating
- Ushers
- Vinnie's Pizza
- Westinghouse in Wilmerding
- Xitech
- Yinz
- Zambelli Fireworks

== Bonus features on the DVD ==
Considering how they did not pick a "P" in the program, they added extra stories from other WQED specials:

- Penn Mac from "The Strip Show"
- Penn Brewery from "North Side Story"
- The Pretzel Shop from "South Side"
- Primanti's from "The Strip Show"
- PPG Place or PPG Plaza from "Downtown Pittsburgh" and "Thing's We've Made"
- Pip's Diner from "Pennsylvania Diners and Other Roadside Restaurants"

== See also ==
- Pennsylvania Diners And Other Roadside Restaurants
