= Shore Things =

- Genre: Documentary
- Country of origin: United States
- Original language: English

Production
- Producer: Rick Sebak
- Running time: 57 minutes

Original release
- Release: July 31, 1996

Shore Things is a 1996 PBS television documentary produced, written and narrated by Rick Sebak of WQED in Pittsburgh. The show profiles American beaches, the things they are known for, and other notable facts.

== Beaches ==
The beaches and other things featured are:

- Daytona Beach, Florida — cars allowed on sand
- Stephen Leatherman — "Dr. Beach"
- Venice, Los Angeles, California — canals; artists
- Ocean City, New Jersey — boardwalk; salt water taffy; dry town
- Ocean City, Maryland — crabs
- Outer Banks — fishing
- Punalu'u, Hawai'i — 'oama (or 'owama) fishing
- Calabash, North Carolina — seafood
- Rehoboth Beach, Delaware — gay beach
- Cape Cod — horseshoe crabs; Cape Cod National Seashore
- Nantucket, Massachusetts — sailing
- Lucy the Elephant — Margate City, New Jersey
- Ocean Beach, San Diego, California — dog beach
- Kailua, Hawaii — a "simple" beach

== Additional topics ==
Bonus features on the DVD Include

- Kelly's Roast Beef from "Sandwiches That You Will Like"
- Santa Cruz Beach Boardwalk from "Great Old Amusement Parks"
- Ligonier Beech from "Things That Are Still Here"
