= Big Red (Western Kentucky University) =

Mascot of the sports teams of Western Kentucky University

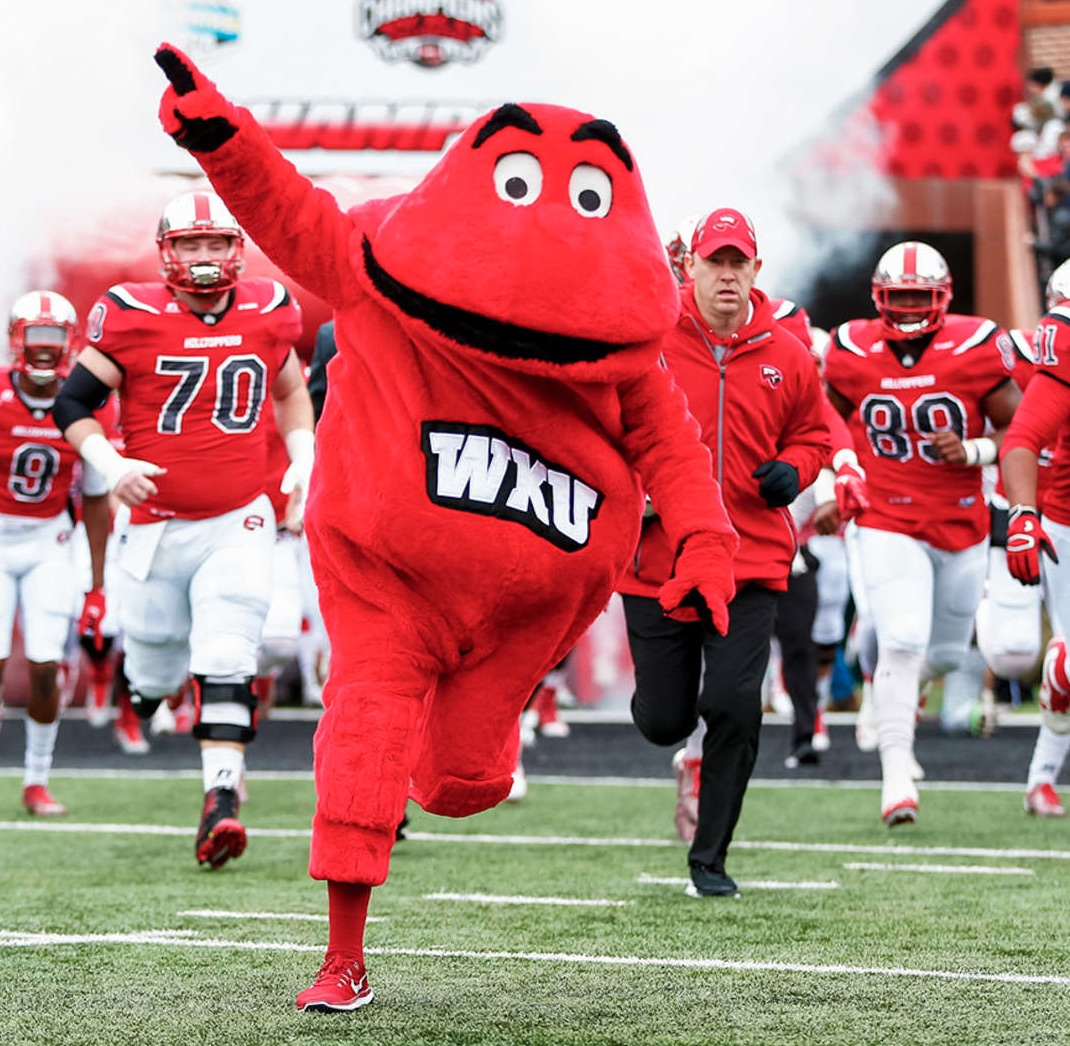
- WKU's mascot Big Red was created by student Ralph Carey in 1979.
- Team: Western Kentucky Hilltoppers and Lady Toppers
- University: Western Kentucky University
- Conference: Conference USA
- Description: Red cartoon-like character
- First seen: December 1, 1979
- Hall of Fame: 2007

Big Red is the mascot of Western Kentucky University's sports teams, the "Hilltoppers" and "Lady Toppers". It is a red, furry blob created by Ralph Carey in 1979. Big Red is meant to symbolize the spirit of WKU students and alumni as well as the sports teams' nickname, the "Hilltoppers," a name chosen because the school's campus sits atop a hill 232 feet above the Barren River flowing through WKU's home city of Bowling Green.

== Creation ==
Prior to the start of the 1979 college basketball season, WKU student Ralph Carey volunteered to create a mascot for the school's sports teams. It was hoped a mascot would generate enthusiasm and supplement the iconic red towels waved by fans in the stands. Carey said he wanted to create something unique that stayed as far away as possible from the stereotype many have of Kentuckians. Although he liked the antics of the San Diego Padres' chicken mascot and initially sketched a bear wearing a sweater emblazoned with the letter "W", he ultimately decided not to use a known animal or entity.

Carey eventually presented the sketch of a red, furry blob-like mascot concept to a committee which included future university president Gary Ransdell. When asked what the character should be called, Carey suggested 'Big Red' as an acknowledgement of the nickname given to WKU sports teams. The concept was approved. After some refinement, Carey constructed the first Big Red costume by hand. It consisted of "air conditioner foam, fake fur, plastic tubing and aluminum framing". The materials cost was roughly $300. Carey then performed in the suit he created when Big Red debuted at a home basketball game on December 1, 1979, in WKU's E.A. Diddle Arena. Carey graduated in 1980. The suit was then handed down to fellow student Mark Greer. Greer was the first to portray the character at a WKU football game in the fall of that year.

Historically, tryouts for students who want to portray Big Red are held in April of each year. The university library maintains an archive of every student who has portrayed the character. When a WKU student who portrayed Big Red graduates, they are allowed to wear the Big Red "gloves" on graduation day to let people know they were a WKU mascot.

== Description ==
According to WKU's branding guide, Big Red is neither male nor female. It must always be red and display "WKU"—the abbreviation for Western Kentucky University —– on the front. The character cannot talk, but Mark Greer, the second person ever to portray Big Red, noted, "It’s a very funny suit. ... It can make expressions where most mascots have one stupid expression on their face at all times. Big Red can show emotion like no other mascot." The character's signature moves are the belly slide and the belly shake.

The Bowling Green Daily News, the paper of record in WKU's home city, described Big Red as the "amorphous, ambiguous, asexual and always lovable representative of the school’s athletics", although in response to a Twitter message from WKU wishing Big Red a happy birthday, Ryan Nanni of SB Nation's college football blog "Every Day Should Be Saturday" speculated that having a birthday implied that Big Red was the result of—and was created by—sexual reproduction.

== Recognition ==
Big Red won the Universal Cheerleading Association's Key to the Spirit award in 1980, 1981 and 1983. It reached the Universal Cheerleading Association's Final Four and was awarded 2nd runner-up to collegiate Mascot of the Year in 1990. In 1996 it reached the Final Four of ESPN's "Battle of the Mascots." In 2002, the character was part of ESPN's promotion of the SportsCenter's 25,000th.

In 2007, WKU alumna Kate Mercer Miller appeared as a contestant on the game show "Deal or No Deal" and brought Big Red as one of her seven supporters who appear on the show. Big Red has also appeared as a guest on "The Ellen Degeneres Show", "The Tony Danza Show", and "The Early Show".

Big Red has been selected eight times to compete in the Capital One Mascot Challenge in the competition's ten-year history, reaching the semifinals of the 2006 Capital One Mascot Challenge. That year, Big Red appeared on the game show "Wheel of Fortune" as part of the promotion of the Challenge.

In 2012, Big Red was the first mascot inducted into the Capital One Mascot Challenge Hall of Fame. Big Red also ranked tenth in the inaugural Cheetos Top 25 Cheesiest College Mascots that year.

In 2017, WKU's student newspaper, the College Heights Herald, reported that a crowdfunding campaign on the website SpiritFunder raised over $7,000 from 44 donors in three days to purchase a new costume for Big Red.

== Italian copyright lawsuit ==
In 2003, Western Kentucky University sued Antonio Ricci and Italian television station Mediaset for $250 million, claiming that Gabibbo, a character created by Ricci and featured on Mediaset's show Striscia la Notizia, was a "carbon copy" of Big Red and infringed on the university's intellectual property rights. Gabibbo debuted and was trademarked in Italy in 1990; although Big Red first appeared in 1979, the character was not trademarked in Italy until 1991. WKU cited a 1991 interview with Italian magazine Novella 2000 in which Ricci told the interviewer that the idea for Gabibbo came to him after seeing a photo of Big Red, noting "Big Red became Gabibbo." When a reporter from The New York Times confronted Ricci about the quote in 2004, shortly after WKU's lawsuit had been filed, he recanted, saying he was joking in the 1991 interview and had only seen Big Red after the Novella 2000 interviewer showed him a picture.

Because the infringement was alleged to have occurred in Italy, the dispute was adjudicated in the Italian court system. WKU won each round of the case in lower Italian courts, but in 2008, the Court of Lugo ruled in favor of Mediaset. The ruling held that Big Red's function as a mascot was entitled to copyright protection, but that the likeness of Big Red was in the public domain and ineligible for copyright protection. It further noted differences in the appearance and behavior of the characters, including Gabibbo's trademark tuxedo (in contrast to Big Red's apparel bearing the "WKU" abbreviation) and Gabibbo's ability to speak.

On appeal, the court of appeals in Milan ruled in favor of Ricci and Mediaset. In 2018, WKU and Big Red's creator, Ralph Carey, re-filed the lawsuit, and the Italian Supreme Court ruled that the case had merit, sending it back to the Milan Court of Appeals.
