= Pigeons in New York City =

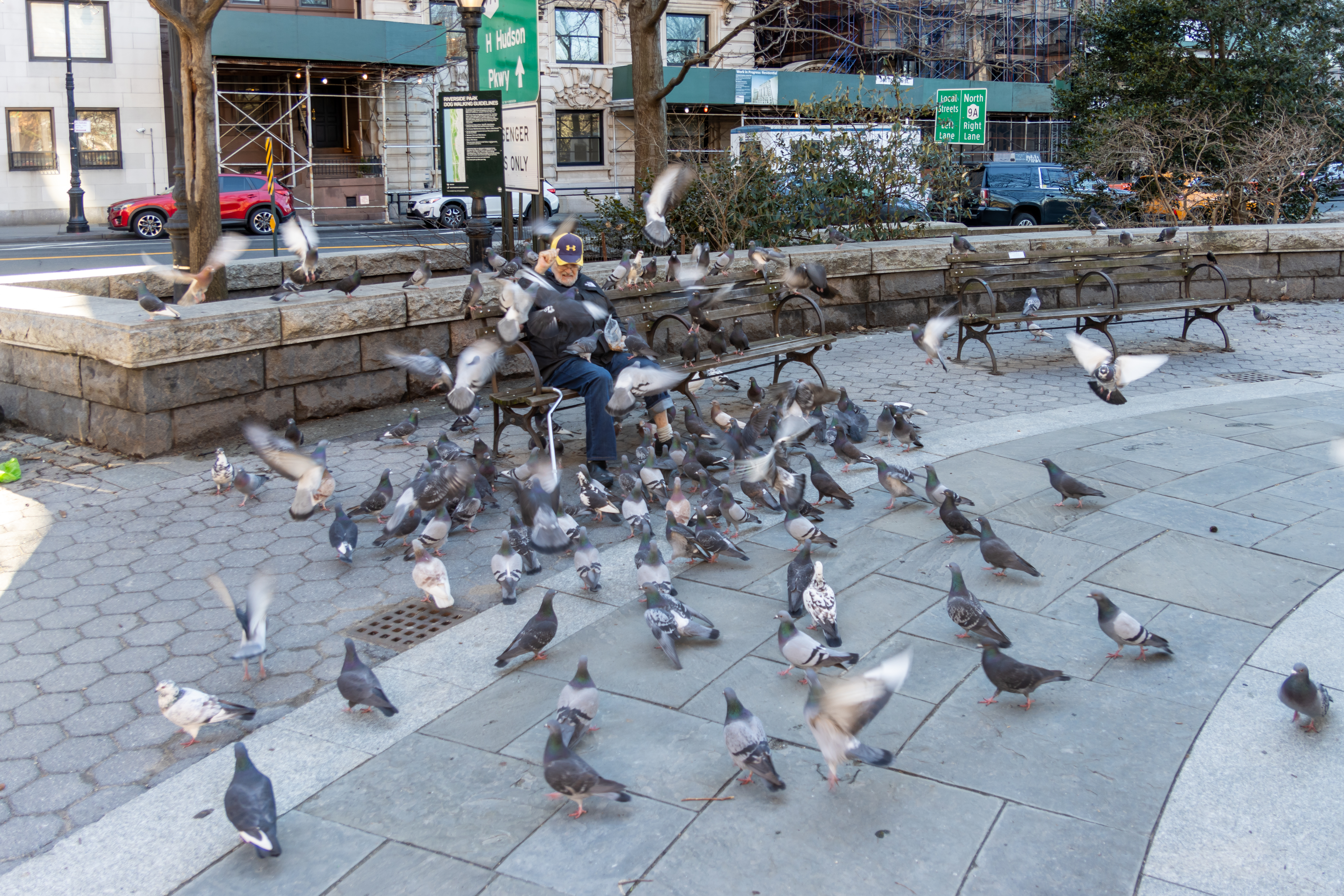
A man feeding pigeons in Manhattan in 2024

There were approximately 9 million pigeons in the American city of New York City in 2024. According to the New York City Department of Parks and Recreation, pigeons "are as much a part of NYC's identity as bagels, pizza, and the subway". It is legal to own pigeons in the city.

The New York Times has described local performance artist Mother Pigeon as "a pro-pigeon activist who feeds flocks of pigeons dressed as a pigeon while also selling felted figurines of pigeons".

Pigeon Fest was a June 14, 2025 festival held in New York City inspired by the Dinosaur statue. It was held on National Pigeon Appreciation Day. Hundreds of people attended. The festival included a pigeon impersonation pageant, which was won by British artist Miriam Abrahams. Mother Pigeon was among the featured performers.

In July 2025, a 700-pound inflatable pigeon floated down the New York Harbor as part of a promotion for New York City FC.

Fast Company has credited the company Birdmaster for "single-handedly pigeon-proof[ing] almost every important building in the city" since 1989, including Carnegie Hall, the Metropolitan Museum of Art, the Morgan Library, the New York Public Library, the New York Stock Exchange Building, the Statue of Liberty, and the Washington Square Arch.

== See also ==
- Birding in New York City
- Rats in New York City
