= Return to Downtown Pittsburgh =

"Return To Downtown Pittsburgh" is a 2016 documentary by Rick Sebak about present downtown Pittsburgh. This is a sequel to the 1992 program Downtown Pittsburgh. Return To Downtown Pittsburgh includes stories about PNC Tower, Banner Coin Exchange, Blue Bird Kitchen, The Union Trust Building, Light Up Night, The Fountain at the Point, Mellon Square, and many more.
