= Simone Leigh =

American artist from Chicago (born 1967)

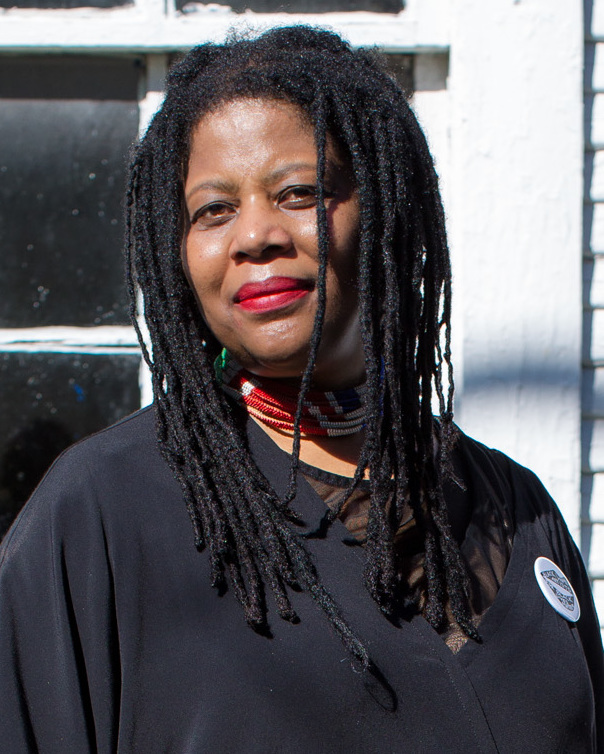
- Leigh in 2017
- Born: 1967 (age 58–59); Chicago, Illinois
- Awards: Guggenheim Fellowship; Louis Comfort Tiffany Foundation Biennial Award; Creative Capital grantee; Lower Manhattan Cultural Council's Michael Richards Award; Joan Mitchell Foundation grant; Artist-in-Residence The Studio Museum in Harlem; New York Foundation for the Arts fellowship; Art Matters Foundation grant; Foundation for Contemporary Arts Grants to Artists award (2018); Hugo Boss Prize (2018); Venice Biennale Golden Lion (2022)
- Website: simoneleigh.com

Simone Leigh (born 1967) is an American artist from Chicago with a studio in Brooklyn. She works in various media including sculpture, installations, video, performance, and social practice. Leigh has described her work as auto-ethnographic, and her interests include African art and vernacular objects, performance, and feminism. Her work is concerned with the marginalization of women of color and reframes their experience as central to society. Leigh has said that her work is focused on "Black female subjectivity," with an interest in complex interplays between various strands of history. She was named one of the 100 most influential people in the world by Time magazine in 2023.

== Early life and education ==
Simone Leigh was born in 1967 in Chicago, Illinois, to Jamaican immigrants who came to the United States as missionaries for the Church of the Nazarene. She grew up mostly in South Shore on Chicago's South Side. Her neighborhood had become segregated by white flight beginning in the 1960s; nonetheless, she viewed the South Side of Chicago as a wonderful place for a black person to grow up. Describing her childhood in an interview, Leigh stated "Everyone was black, so I grew up feeling like my blackness didn't predetermine anything about me. It was very good for my self-esteem. I still feel lucky that I grew up in that crucible." She went to Kenwood Academy High School and like her three siblings excelled in her academics.

Although her parents wanted her to go to a stricter religious school and live at home, Leigh chose Earlham College, associated with the Quakers, in Richmond, Indiana. She then became estranged from her parents and worked to put herself through college. She received a BA in art with a minor in philosophy in 1990.

== Career ==
"I came to my artistic practice via the study of philosophy, cultural studies, and a strong interest in African and African American art, which has imbued my object and performance-based work with a concern for the ethnographic, especially the way it records and describes objects."

After graduating in 1990, Leigh planned to become a social worker. After an internship at the National Museum of African Art and stint at a studio near Charlottesville, Virginia, she embraced art as a career. She moved to Williamsburg in Brooklyn and met her future husband (later divorced) an art photographer. As a young mother, she worked intently to get showings and galleries interested in her ceramics work but it was not until 2001 that she began to call herself an artist. In 2015 she remarked, "I tried not to be an artist for a really long time but at a certain point I realized I was not going to stop doing it."

Leigh combines her training in American ceramics with an interest in African pottery, using African motifs which tend to have modernist characteristics. Though she considers herself to be primarily a sculptor, she recently has been involved in social sculpture, or social practice work that engages the public directly. Her objects often employ materials and forms traditionally associated with African art, and her performance-influenced installations create spaces where historical precedent and self-determination co-mingle. She describes this combination representing "a collapsing of time." Her work has been described as part of a generation's reimagining of ceramics in a cross-disciplinary context. She has given artist lectures in many institutions nationally and internationally, has taught in the ceramics department of the Rhode Island School of Design and has fired ceramics as a visiting artist at Anderson Ranch Arts Center in Colorado.

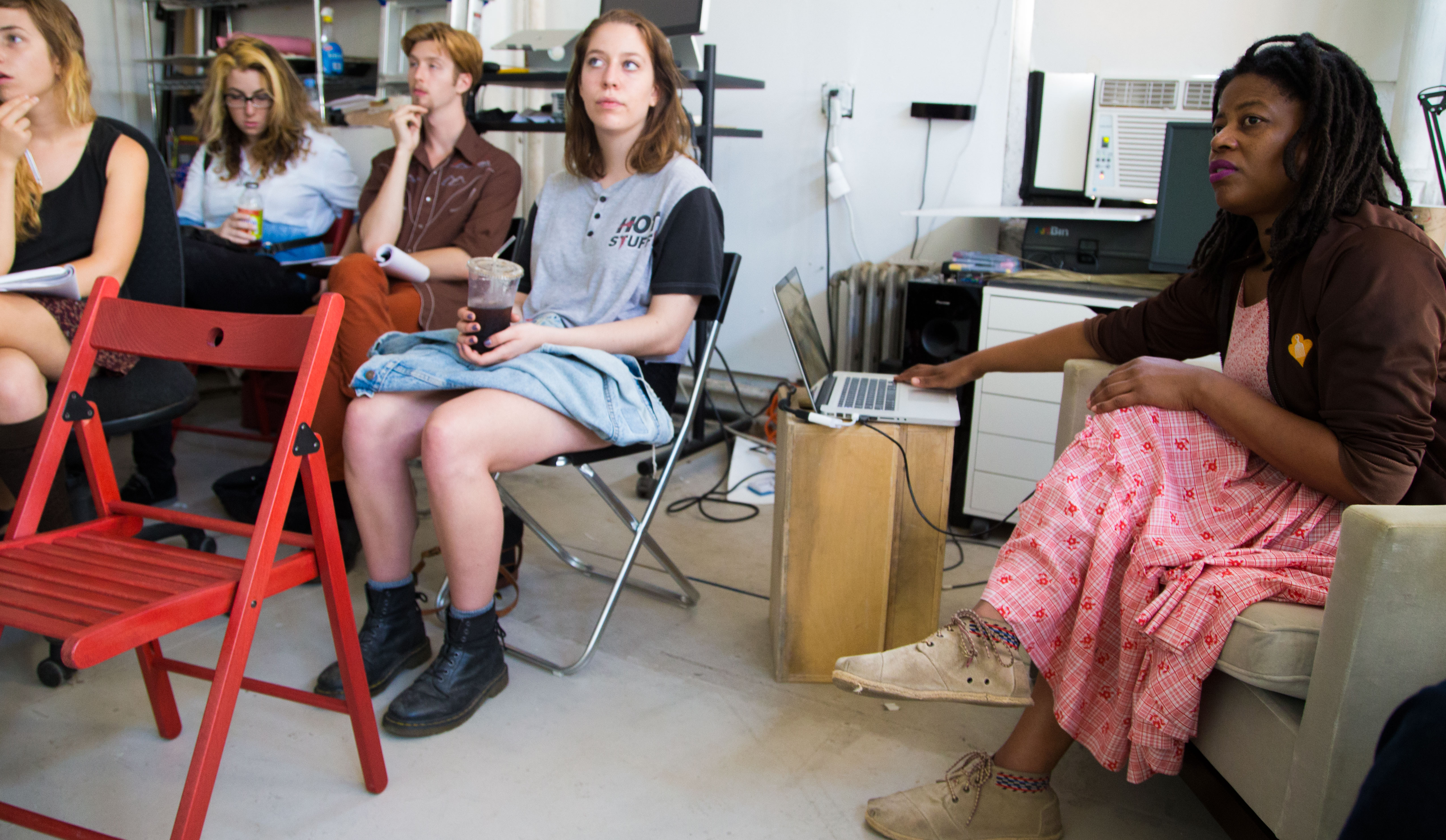
Leigh lecturing in 2013

In October 2020, Leigh was selected to represent the United States at the 2022 Venice Biennale. She was the first black woman to do so. Her showing of works known as a presentation was entitled "Sovereignty". She was also awarded the Golden Lion for her work Brick House in the general exhibition. Leigh created her first portrait sculpture, Sharifa, with Sharifa Rhodes-Pitts, a Harlem cultural historian, as her subject. The film Conspiracy, featured in her solo show at the Biennale, was co-produced with filmmaker and visual artist Madeleine Hunt-Ehrlich.

== Works and critical reception ==
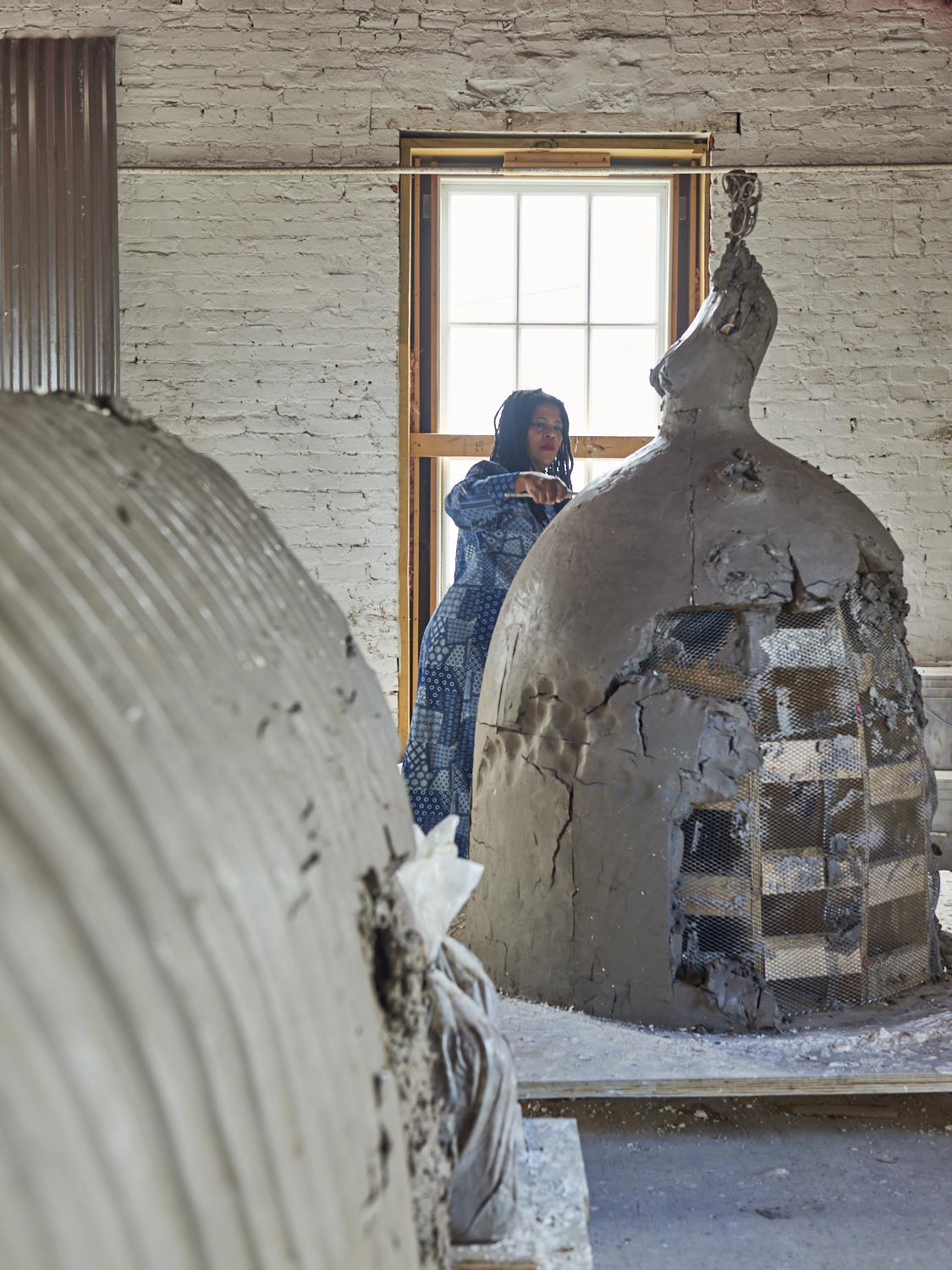
Leigh working in her studio

Leigh has exhibited internationally including: MoMA PS1, Walker Art Center, Studio Museum in Harlem, Yerba Buena Center for the Arts, The Hammer Museum, The Kitchen, The Bronx Museum of the Arts, Tilton Gallery, Contemporary Arts Museum Houston, SculptureCenter, Pérez Art Museum Miami, Kunsthalle Wien in Vienna, L'appartement 22 in Rabat, Morocco, the Andy Warhol Museum in Pittsburgh, and the Association for Visual Arts Gallery in Cape Town, South Africa. Leigh organized an event with a group of women artists, who performed in "Black Women Artists for Black Lives Matter" part of her solo exhibition, The Waiting Room at the New Museum in 2016. Her large bronze sculpture of a woman, Sharifa, became the first sculpture by a living artist to be permanently displayed in the sculpture garden of the Art Institute of Chicago, after appearing at the Venice Biennial. Leigh's work was selected among "the most important and relevant work" by curators Jane Panetta and Rujeko Hockley for the 2019 Whitney Biennial.

During her residency at the New Museum, Leigh founded an organization called Black Women Artists for Black Lives Matter (BWAforBLM), a collective formed in direct response to the murder of Philando Castille, and in protest against other similar injustices against black lives.

Simone Leigh is the creator of the Free People's Medical Clinic a social practice project created with Creative Time in 2014. A reenactment of the Black Panther Party's initiative of the same name. The installation was located in a 1914 Bed-Stuy brownstone called the Stuyvesant Mansion, previously owned by notable African-American doctor Josephine English (1920–2011). As an homage to this history, Leigh created a walk-in health center with yoga, nutrition and massage sessions, staffed by volunteers in 19th-century nurse uniforms.

She is the recipient of many awards, including: a Guggenheim Fellowship; the Venice Biennale Golden Lion (2022); The Herb Alpert Award; a Creative Capital grant; a Blade of Grass Fellowship; the Studio Museum in Harlem's Joyce Alexander Wein Artist Prize; the Guggenheim Museum's Hugo Boss Prize; United States Artists fellowship; and a Foundation for Contemporary Arts Grants to Artists award (2018). She was named one of Artsy Editorial's "Most Influential Artists" of 2018. Her work has been written about in many publications, including Art in America, Artforum, Sculpture Magazine, Modern Painters, The New Yorker, The New York Times, Small Axe, and Bomb magazine.

Simone Leigh's work and practice is the subject of a 2023 monograph, edited by Eva Respini. The monograph includes essays and reflections on Leigh's work from a number of Black scholars, including from Hortense Spillers, Denise Ferreira da Silva, Saidiya Hartman, Christina Sharpe, and Dionne Brand, among others.

=== Brick House ===
The Brick House sculpture's torso combines the forms of a skirt and a clay Mousgoum domed hut (or teleuk) while the sculpture's head is crowned with an afro framed by cornrow braids. This 5,900-pound bronze bust is of a Black woman with a torso standing 16 feet high and 9 feet in diameter at its base.Brick House is the inaugural commission for the High Line Plinth, a landmark destination for major public artworks in New York City since 2019, and is part of a series of art installations that will rotate every eighteen months and the first space on the High Line dedicated solely to new commissions of contemporary art. The content of Leigh's sculpture directly contrasts the location in which it is sited in New York since it is situated where "glass-and-steel towers shoot up from among older industrial-era brick buildings, and where architectural and human scales are in constant negotiation." In 2020, another original Brick House was permanently installed in another urban location (albeit surrounded by a patch of grass) at the key gateway to the University City campus of University of Pennsylvania (near corner of 34th Street and Woodland Walk adjacent to Penn's School of Design). Brick House is the first piece in Leigh's Anatomy of Architecture collection, an ongoing body of work where the artist combines architectural forms from regions as varied as West Africa and the Southern United States with the human body. Brick House combines a number of different architectural styles: "Batammaliba architecture from Benin and Togo, the teleuk dwellings of the Mousgoum people of Cameroon and Chad, and the restaurant named Mammy's Cupboard located on US Highway 61 south of Natchez, Mississippi." One edition of Brick House now resides at the beginning of the Freedom Monument Sculpture Park in Montgomery, Alabama.

=== The Waiting Room ===
The Waiting Room was exhibited at the New Museum in New York City from June to September 2016. This exhibition honors Esmin Elizabeth Green, who died from blood clots after sitting in a waiting room of a Brooklyn hospital for 24 hours, and provides an alternative vision of health care shaped by female, African-American experience. In an interview with the Guardian, Leigh says "obedience is one of the main threats to black women's health" and "what happened to Green is an example of the lack of empathy people have towards the pain of black women." The Waiting Room involved public and private care sessions from different traditions of medicine such as herbalism, meditation rooms, movement studios, and other holistic approaches to healthcare. Outside of museum hours this exhibition became "The Waiting Room Underground" providing free, private workshops outside of the public eye, an homage to the healthcare work of the Black Panthers and the United Order of Tents. Additionally this exhibition featured lectures; workshops on self-defense, home economics, and self-awareness; Taiko drumming lessons for LGBTQ youth, and summer internships with the museum for teens. This work came after and is related to Leigh's previous project Free People's Medical Clinic (2014).

== Recognition ==
Leigh is a recipient of the Venice Biennale Golden Lion (2022); the Studio Museum in Harlem's Joyce Alexander Wein Artist Prize (2017); John Simon Guggenheim Memorial Foundation Fellowship (2016); Anonymous Was a Woman Award (2016); Herb Alpert Award in the Arts (2016); A Blade of Grass Fellowship for Socially Engaged Art (2016); Guggenheim Fellowship (2012); Louis Comfort Tiffany Foundation Biennial Award, Creative Capital Grantee, Lower Manhattan Cultural Council's Micheal Richards Award (2012); Joan Mitchell Foundation Grant, Artist-in-Residence The Studio Museum in Harlem (2010–11); NYFA Fellowship, Art Matters Foundation Grant (2009); Foundation for Contemporary Arts Grants to Artists Award (2018); and The Hugo Boss Prize (2018) (a $100,000 award facilitated by the Guggenheim Museum that ranks among the world's top art prizes).

== Art market ==
As of 2021, Leigh was represented by Matthew Marks Gallery. She was previously represented by Hauser & Wirth (2019–2021), David Kordansky Gallery (2019), and Luhring Augustine Gallery (2016–2019).

In 2023, Leigh's sculpture Stick (2019), sold for $2.7 million at Christie's in New York, a record for the artist. Her previous auction record, a life-size mixed media female head titled Birmingham (2012), was sold for $2.2 million at Sotheby's in New York in 2022.

== Exhibitions ==
Leigh has staged many solo shows at galleries and museums in the United States and internationally, as well as several solo public art installations. Her solo shows include Simone Leigh (2004) Momenta Art, New York; if you wan fo' lick old woman pot, you scratch him back (2008), Rush Arts Gallery, New York; You Don't Know Where Her Mouth Has Been (2012), The Kitchen, New York; Gone South (2014), Atlanta Contemporary Art Center; The Waiting Room (2016), New Museum, New York; Psychic Friends Network (2016), Tate Modern, London; inHarlem: Simone Leigh (2016), Marcus Garvey Park, Studio Museum in Harlem, New York; Loophole of Retreat (2019), Solomon R. Guggenheim Museum, New York; Brick House (2019), High Line, New York; Simone Leigh (2021), Hauser & Wirth, Zurich; Trophallaxis (2008–17), Pérez Art Museum Miami (2022–2023); Sovereignty (2022), American pavilion, 59th Venice Biennale; and Simone Leigh (2023), originating at the Institute of Contemporary Art, Boston.

Leigh has also participated in many group exhibitions, including the Dakar Biennale (2014); Berlin Biennale (2019); Whitney Biennial (2019); Prospect.5 (2021), Prospect New Orleans; and The Milk of Dreams (2022), 59th Venice Biennale.

Her work was included in the 2024 exhibition Making Their Mark: Works from the Shah Garg Collection at the Berkeley Art Museum and Pacific Film Archive (BAMPFA).

Leigh was chosen to represent the United States at the 59th Venice Biennale in 2022. Her works from the Venice Biennale later made their United States premiere in Boston at the Institute of Contemporary Art. The exhibition was titled Simone Leigh, and it also included ceramic, bronze, and video artwork from throughout her career. The exhibition was curated by Chief Curator Barbara Lee and deputy director for Curatorial Affairs Eva Respini, who also curated the United States' pavilion at the 59th Venice Biennale. The exhibition ran at the ICA from April 6 to September 4, 2023. It then was displayed at the Hirshhorn Museum and Sculpture Garden in Washington, D.C. from November 3, 2023, to March 3, 2024. Then, the exhibition was jointly presented at the Los Angeles County Museum of Art (LACMA) and the California African American Museum (CAAM) from May 26, 2024, to January 20, 2025.

Leigh exhibited 'Recent Sculptures' at the Turner Contemporary in Margate, Kent, England from October 2025.

== Personal life ==
Leigh married art photographer Yuri Marder. Marder had been one of her roommates in Brooklyn when she first moved there. He was the grandson of a Holocaust survivor. They had one daughter together in the 1990s and later divorced.

== Notable works in public collections ==
- Breakdown (2011), by Simone Leigh and Liz Magic Laser, Solomon R. Guggenheim Museum, New York; and Smithsonian American Art Museum, Smithsonian Institution, Washington, D.C.
- My Dreams, My Works Must Wait Till After Hell (2011), by Simone Leigh and Chitra Ganesh, Smithsonian American Art Museum, Smithsonian Institution, Washington, D.C.; and Whitney Museum, New York
- Stack II (2015), KMAC Museum, Louisville, Kentucky
- Trophallaxis (2008–2017), Pérez Art Museum Miami
- Dunham (2017), Art Institute of Chicago
- Georgia Mae (2017), Solomon R. Guggenheim Museum, New York
- 103 (Face Jug Series) (2018), University of Iowa Stanley Museum of Art, Iowa City
- Cupboard VII (2018), Whitney Museum, New York
- Figure with Skirt (2018), Nelson-Atkins Museum of Art, Kansas City, Missouri
- No Face (Crown Heights) (2018), Phillips Collection, Washington, D.C.
- No Face (Pannier) (2018), Museum of Fine Arts, Boston
- Opuwo (2018), Rhode Island School of Design Museum, Providence
- Brick House (2019), University of Pennsylvania, Philadelphia
- Corrugated (2019), North Carolina Museum of Art, Raleigh; and Moderna Museet, Stockholm
- Cupboard IX (2019), Institute of Contemporary Art, Boston
- Las Meninas (2019), Cleveland Museum of Art
- Sentinel (2019), Art Gallery of New South Wales, Sydney, Australia
- Stick (2019), Whitney Museum, New York
- Loophole of Retreat (2019), Brooklyn Museum, New York
- Kasama (2020), Nasher Sculpture Center, Dallas
- Quonset (2020), Whitney Museum, New York
- Sentinel IV (2020), Landmarks, University of Texas at Austin
- Sphinx (2021), Joslyn Art Museum, Omaha, Nebraska
- Village Series (2021), Buffalo AKG Art Museum, Buffalo, New York
- Village Series (2021), Glenstone, Potomac, Maryland
- Sentinel (2022), National Gallery of Art, Washington, D.C.
- Sharifa (2022) Art Institute of Chicago.

== Bibliography ==
- Stefan Üner: Black Renaissance. Simone Leigh, Sandra Mujinga und die Biennale 2022, in: stayinart, special edition, Innsbruck 2022, p. 82–89.
