= The Prettiots =

American alternative band

- Origin: Brooklyn, New York
- Genres: Indie rock, alternative rock
- Label: Rough Trade Records
- Members: Kay Kasparhauser; Lulu Landolfi
- Past members: Rachel Trachtenburg
- Website: Website

The Prettiots are an American all-female alternative band from Brooklyn, New York, consisting of Kay Kasparhauser (Goldberg) and Lulu Landolfi. Rachel Trachtenburg was the band's drummer briefly. After performing five shows at SXSW in 2015, the band was praised by NPR music critics Bob Boilen and Robin Hilton and was signed to Rough Trade Records.

Their first full-length album, Funs Cool, was released in 2016 and earned positive reviews from critics, who praised the blunt honesty of their lyrics, the prominent use of the ukulele in their music, and their inventive reinterpretations of other songs (The Misfits, Dolly Parton). Several reviewers noted that The Prettiots subvert the "cutesy" tropes and expectations that come along with being an independent band fronted by women and featuring ukulele.

The single, Suicide Hotline, has been especially praised for its sardonic humor and honest discussion of mental health. Katie Presley of NPR wrote that the song "couches stunning barbs of insight between sweet, fun harmonies and playful ukulele strums."

It is unclear the current state of the band; their Instagram account has been active, and they have hinted at new music, but nothing has been released.

== Discography ==
=== Albums ===
- Funs Cool (2016, Rough Trade)

=== Singles ===
- "Boys (That I Dated In Highschool)" (2015, Rough Trade)
- "Suicide Hotline" (2015, Rough Trade)
- "Stabler" (2015, Rough Trade)
