= Freedom Monument Sculpture Park =

Monument in Montgomery, Alabama, US

- Interactive map of Freedom Monument Sculpture Park
- Location: 831 Walker St, Montgomery, AL 36104
- Coordinates: 32.38935°N 86.31352°W
- Opening date: April 27, 2024; 2 years ago
- Website: legacysites.eji.org/about/monument/
- Owner: Equal Justice Initiative

The Freedom Monument Sculpture Park in Montgomery, Alabama, is the third of four "Legacy sites" developed by the non-profit Equal Justice Initiative.

Starting in 2021, EJI acquired 17 acres in Montgomery on the Alabama River to erect the National Monument to Freedom, a 43 feet tall, 155 feet long wall depicting 122,000 surnames adopted by the 4.7 million formerly enslaved African Americans listed on the 1870 United States census, the first census to list African Americans entirely as free people. QR codes on display near the monument allow visitors to find other African Americans listed in later censuses with the same surname. The park includes 170-year-old dwellings from nearby cotton plantations, objects made by enslaved persons, replicas of rail cars and holding pens, and audio recordings of people speaking in the Muscogee language, the language of the indigenous people of the park's area. The park also includes various sculptures created by Charles Gaines, Alison Saar, Kwame Akoto-Bamfo, Simone Leigh, Wangechi Mutu, Rose B. Simpson, Theaster Gates, Kehinde Wiley, and Hank Willis Thomas. The park opened on March 27, 2024. Stevenson stated to W that the idea was inspired by his 2021 visit to a former slave plantation (his first visit to any plantation), which he felt marginalized the slave experience in favor of the slaveowner's mansion's architecture.

Visitors to the Park may arrive by car, by free shuttle from another Legacy Site, or following a short boat ride on the Alabama River, the same route that enslaved Africans took to get to downtown Montgomery where enslaved families were split up and sold.
