= Vess =

Brand of soft drink

Vess Soda is a brand of soft drink manufactured and distributed primarily in the St. Louis, Missouri, United States metropolitan area and recently in Canada through Dollarama and Giant Tiger locations. The company was founded in 1916 by Sylvester "Vess" Jones.

Charles Leiper Grigg, who later developed 7UP, developed and marketed his first soft drink, called "Whistle", an orange soda which is still sold by Vess. The success of Whistle led to his promotion to the position of sales and marketing manager; however, eventually he and Vess came to an unreconcilable disagreement and Grigg left the company, leaving Whistle behind. While Whistle was marketed individually, the Vess logo was used on other soda flavors. The 1929 stock market crash left the company in bad financial shape, and the business was sold to Donald Schneeberger, who was considered a genius at marketing and added several new flavors to the line, many of which are still produced today. At the height of its popularity, Vess had bottling plants in several locations, including Asheville, North Carolina; Lafayette, Indiana; Anderson, Indiana; and Cincinnati, Ohio.

Vess was purchased in 1994 by Cott Beverages. In 2017, Refresco purchased Cott and the Vess label. Vess continued to be distributed primarily in the Midwestern United States with its core business centering around St. Louis, where the Vess bottle statue near the Gateway Arch is a protected landmark. In 2021, Vess hired Folsom Distributing Company of St. Louis to distribute its products in the St. Louis region.

== Products ==
As of 2007, Vess is sold in small plastic bottles and cans, and 2- and 3-liter bottles. Its slogan is "The Billion Bubble Beverage."

=== Discontinued ===
In the 1980s, Vess produced a chocolate beverage similar to Yoo-hoo called Vess Chocolate, discontinued in the mid-1990s.

Vess also made Holy Cow collectible soda in a variety of flavors in 1988. It had an image of Harry Caray's face on each can.

== See also ==
- 7 Up
- Coca-Cola
- Pepsi-Cola
- Shasta
- The Bottle District
