= Betty Glassman Trachtenberg =

American college administrator

- Born: Betty Glassman; October 16, 1933; Philadelphia, Pennsylvania
- Died: March 14, 2023 (age 89); Hamden, Connecticut
- Occupation: College administrator
- Spouse: Alan Trachtenberg

Betty Glassman Trachtenberg (October 16, 1933 – March 14, 2023) was an American college administrator. She was Dean of Student Affairs at Yale College from 1987 to 2007.

== Early life and education ==
Glassman was born in Philadelphia, the daughter of Solomon Glassman and Anna London Glassman. Both of her parents were Jewish immigrants from Eastern Europe. Her father ran a grocery store. She studied piano with Leo Ornstein, and graduated from Girls High School in 1951.

== Career ==
Trachtenberg worked in administration at Yale College, beginning in 1974 in the summer program, and then in the admissions office, where she was associate director. She was director of the Eli Whitney Students Program for nontraditional-age students, and active in the Yale Women's Center. She was a founding leader of the Sexual Harassment Grievance Board, and the Sexual Harassment and Assault Resource and Education Center, both at Yale.

Trachtenberg was Yale College's Dean of Student Affairs from 1987 until she retired in 2007. This position brought her into the center of campus policy enforcement controversies. In the 1990s she was named as a defendant in a lawsuit by the "Yale Five", a group of Orthodox Jewish students who argued that Yale's undergraduate housing policies were discriminatory. The suit was dismissed in 1998. In 2005, she was responsible for an unpopular new ban on drinking games and extended tailgating at football games. She was also the college's spokesperson when celebrity students made headlines. She gave an oral history interview to the Yale Archives in 2009.

Trachtenberg taught piano as a young woman. in the 1960s she co-founded the Music Academy in State College, Pennsylvania. In her retirement, she served on the board of New Haven's Neighborhood Music School (NMS).

== Personal life ==
Glassman married her childhood friend Alan Trachtenberg in 1952. They had three children, Zev, Elissa, and Julie. Her husband died in 2020, and she died in 2023, at the age of 89, in Hamden, Connecticut.
