= Trachtenburg Family Slideshow Players =

American rock/pop band

- Genre: Anti-folk
- Years active: 2000–2011
- Labels: Bar-None, Tired and Lonesome, Cass, Sarathan, Tummy Touch
- Past members: Jason Trachtenburg; Tina Trachtenburg; Rachel Trachtenburg

The Trachtenburg Family Slideshow Players were an American indie rock/art pop family band. It consisted of main vocalist Jason Trachtenburg, his wife Tina, and their child Rachel.

== Overview ==
The band's members consisted of father, Jason Trachtenburg, who played guitar and piano and sang; mother, Tina Piña, who ran the slide projector and was a backup vocalist; and daughter, Rachel, who played the drums and sang backup. Born on December 10, 1993, Rachel was only six years old when she began performing publicly.

Their trademark was the slideshow: slides collected from "estate sales, garage sales, thrift stores, etc." were constantly shown in order to "turn the lives of annonymous [sic] strangers into pop-rock musical expos[é]s based on the contents of these slide collections". The band sings about things that occurred in the places shown in the slides, such as public execution ("Mountain Trip to Japan, 1959") and McDonald's' competitors (Wendy's, Sambo's and Long John Silver's) "using network television to take advantage of efficiency".

== History ==
Jason first met Tina at a Greenwich Village open mic in New York City around 1989. They soon moved to Seattle, Washington, where their daughter, Rachel, was born in 1993. The family ran a dog-walking business called The Dog Squad by day while Jason was an open-mic performer by night. However, his music act, The Terriers, failed to find audiences.

While dog-walking with Rachel, Tina found an old slide projector and a box of slides at an estate sale from a 1959 family trip to Japan. When Tina suggested that Jason use the slides in his music, he wrote a song to accompany the slides, "Mountain Trip To Japan, 1959". The song was later released on the debut album, Vintage Slide Collections From Seattle, Vol 1. Eventually, the Trachtenburgs formed together, with Jason playing keyboards and guitar and providing vocals, Tina operating the slide projector and Rachel playing harmonica (later playing drums). The trio performed their act at a local talent show and won first place and a $500 prize. They continued their act and later moved to New York City. The Trachtenburgs disbanded in 2008 after Rachel formed her own girl band, Supercute!, in 2009, and Jason formed his band, The Pendulum Swings, also in 2009. Tina continues her artistic endeavors in the parks of Manhattan, where she is known as the performance artist Mother Pigeon.

In a 2024 social media post, Rachel Trachtenburg publicly reflected on her experience in the band, describing her childhood involvement as exploitative and part of a family "business". She also expressed intentions to share her full story in the future.

== Discography ==
Trachtenburg Family Slideshow Players

- Vintage Slide Collections from Seattle, Vol I (2001)
- Adventures in Middle America, Vol. 2 (2004)
- Lost and Found (2011)

Kate Nash – "Kiss That Grrrl" CD single (UK) (2741841)

- 1. "Kiss That Grrrl" – Kate Nash, 3:44
- 2. "Kiss That Grrrl" – performed by The Trachtenburg Family Slideshow Players, 4:42

== DVD releases ==
Self-released untitled 4-track DVD

- "Middle America" live music video
- "Mountain Trip to Japan, 1959" music video
- "Look at Me" – live on the Conan O'Brien show, 3 January 2003
- Sundance Channel documentary

The Trachtenburg Family Slideshow Players: Off & On Broadway (2006)

== Unreleased songs ==
- "World's Best Friend" – performed at Lamb's Theatre in 2006 on The Trachtenburg Family Slideshow Players: Off & On Broadway with The WoWz
- "Charcoal Gray" – a song commissioned for a private party
- "Let's Go On Tour With Kate" – released on the band's website; music video featuring Kate Nash
- "You're the One Who's Made For Me and I was Made for You" (from Jack's Big Music Show)
