= Alan Trachtenberg =

American historian (1932–2020)

Alan Zelick Trachtenberg (March 22, 1932 – August 18, 2020) was an American historian and the Neil Gray Jr. Professor of English and professor emeritus of American Studies at Yale University.

== Biography ==
Born in Philadelphia, Trachtenberg attended Temple University, and earned his Ph.D. in American Studies at the University of Minnesota, writing his dissertation on the Brooklyn Bridge in American literature.

Trachtenberg taught at Penn State for eight years, then spent a year at the Stanford Center for Advanced Study in the Behavioral Sciences, before joining the faculty at Yale in 1969.

He resided in Hamden, Connecticut with his wife Betty (née Glassman), pianist and college administrator, who was dean of students at Yale College from 1987 to 2007.

Trachtenberg's landmark 1990 book, Reading American Photographs: Images as History, Mathew Brady to Walker Evans– A Study of American Photography from 1839 to 1938, won the Charles C. Eldredge Prize that year.

== Selected works ==
- Lincoln's Smile and Other Enigmas, Hill and Wang, 2007, ISBN 978-0-8090-6573-8.
- Shades of Hiawatha: Staging Indians, Making Americans, 1880-1930, Hill and Wang, 2004, ISBN 0-374-29975-7.
- Distinctly American: The Photography of Wright Morris (with Ralph Lieberman) exh. cat. Iris & B. Gerald Cantor Center for Visual Arts at Stanford University, Merrill, 2002. ISBN 1858941768.
- Reading American Photographs: Images as History, Mathew Brady to Walker Evans, Hill and Wang, 1990, ISBN 0-374-52249-9.
- The Incorporation of America: Culture and Society in the Gilded Age, Hill and Wang, 1982, ISBN 0-8090-5827-8.
- Hart Crane, A Collection of Critical Essays. Prentice-Hall, 1982. ISBN 0133839354.
- Classic Essays in Photography (editor), Leetes Island Books, 1981, ISBN 0-918172-07-1.
- Brooklyn Bridge: Fact and Symbol, University Of Chicago Press, 1965, ISBN 0-226-81115-8.
