= Rachel Trachtenburg =

American musician

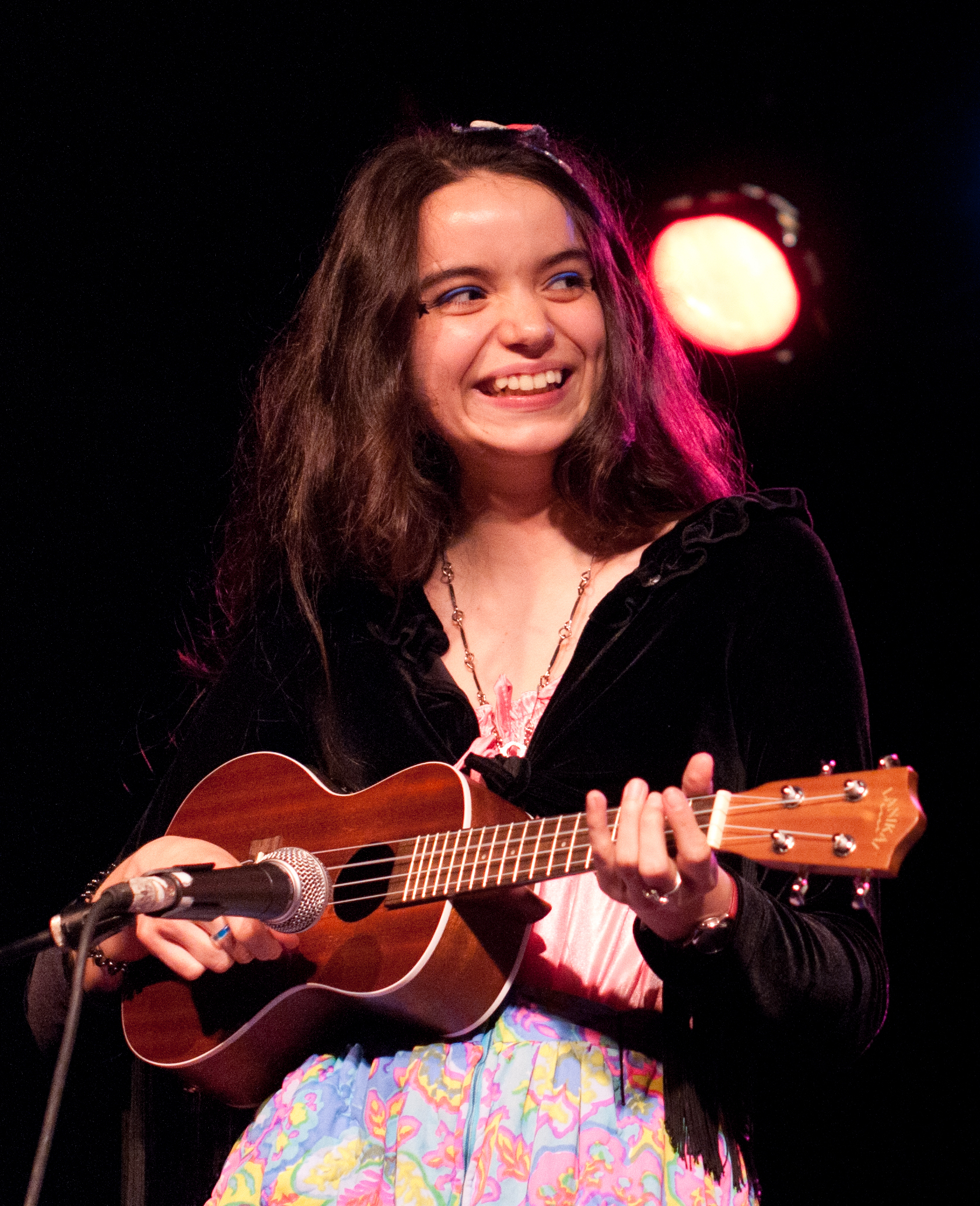
- Trachtenburg performing in 2012

Background information
- Born: Rachel Sage Piña-Trachtenburg; December 10, 1993 (age 32); Seattle, Washington, U.S.
- Genres: Acoustic, anti-folk, indie rock, psychedelic pop
- Occupations: Musician, singer, actress, model, activist
- Instruments: Vocals, ukulele, drums
- Years active: 2000–present

Rachel Sage Piña-Trachtenburg (born December 10, 1993) is an American musician. She is most notable for her key role as drummer and backup vocalist of the Trachtenburg Family Slideshow Players, a family band consisting of herself and her parents, Jason and Tina, from 2000 to 2011. Trachtenburg was also lead singer of the band Supercute! from 2009 to 2013, and is currently the guitarist and vocalist for New York-based trio Wooing. Also a model, Trachtenburg signed to Elite Model Management; a radio talk show host for Gary Null's Progressive Radio Network; and an actress who appeared in indie movies Happy Birthday in 2004, Ruchiki in 2011, and Exteriors in 2014, as well as a television pilot for an unaired children's TV show titled Rachel Trachtenburg's Homemade World in 2009.

== Music career ==
Rachel Trachtenburg has been a member of the Trachtenburg Family Slideshow Players, The Prettiots, Supercute!, and Larry and the Babes. She is currently the guitarist and vocalist for New York–based three-piece band Wooing.

=== Trachtenburg Family Slideshow Players ===
Trachtenburg played harmonica (and later drums) for her parents' act, the Trachtenburg Family Slideshow Players. The band had its early start playing gigs in Seattle in 2000 and 2001 until they moved to New York City in 2002 to reach a larger audience. Trachtenburg and her parents played gigs across America and Europe nonstop from 2003 to 2008. While on the road, Trachtenburg was homeschooled. The band disbanded in 2011 when the band had run its course.

=== Supercute! ===
After the Slideshow Players disbanded, Trachtenburg began to put more focus into her band, Supercute!, an indie pop/psychedelic pop girl band she founded with friend and co-songwriter Julia Cumming. From 2009 through 2013, the band toured several times in America and Europe with their friend and mentor English singer-songwriter Kate Nash, going through several band member changes - founding co-member June Lei left in late 2010 - as well as musical changes. The band recorded a song, "Superrookie!", for the September 2011 debut of Tavi Gevinson's online magazine, Rookie, which was later released as a flexi disc accompanying the 2012 Drawn & Quarterly book release of Rookie Yearbook One. In 2011, the band recorded an entire album (DON'T PoP MY BUBBLE) produced by Kate Nash that featured the single "Dumb Dumbs" - the video of which features cameos of Nash, Jason Trachtenburg and Andrew W.K. Another song from those 2011 sessions ("LoveLoveLeaveLove") received a video release in 2013, but the rest of the album has yet to see the light of day.

==== Discography ====
EPs

Supercute!

EP by Supercute!
- Released: 2010
- Recorded: 2009–2010
- Genres: Indie pop; psychedelic pop; anti-folk

- Supercute! (2010)
1. "Candy City"
2. "Not To Write About Boys"
3. "Haunted Hostel"
4. "Misty Mountain Hop" (Led Zeppelin cover)
5. "Hula Hoop Song"
6. "Supercute!"

Videos

- "Not To Write About Boys", released April 19, 2010
- "Paint It Black", released July 30, 2011
- "Dumb Dumbs", released January 5, 2012
- "LoveLoveLeaveLove", released February 22, 2013

Single

"LoveLoveLeaveLove" b/w "DumbDumbs" (released February 22, 2013, via Bandcamp/Secret Code Records)

Flexidisc

Supercute!'s "Superrookie!" and the Dum Dum Girls' "I Don't Care" were included on a "Rookie Tunes" flexidisc in Rookie Yearbook One, a book edited by Tavi Gevinson and published by Drawn & Quarterly in 2012 (ISBN 9781770461123).

Backing vocals

- "Lost and Found" LP (with the Trachtenburg Family Slideshow Players, released 6/28/11)
- "Coming Up" (with R. Stevie Moore, released 4/20/12)
- "Speed Limit", "Your Best Friend", "If I Could Be Your Hero", "A Christmas Song" (with The Dot Wiggin Band, released 10/29/13)

== Other projects ==
As of 2014, Trachtenburg was signed to Elite Model Management and had appeared in spreads for Lanvin Paris. She is inspired by 1960s and 1970s fashion and as a child, wore homemade clothing made by her mother and clothing bought in thrift stores and vintage clothing shops. Trachtenburg made her acting debut at the age of ten in 2004 in a short indie movie titled Happy Birthday, playing the role of a girl named Lisa. She then starred in an unaired children's television pilot titled Rachel Trachtenburg's Homemade World in 2009, based on an onstage variety show she and her parents did in New York titled Rachel Trachtenburg's Morning Show. She also held a role in 2011's Ruchiki. In 2014, she starred in the short film Exteriors, which premiered at BFI London Film Festival 2014. Her most recent role was in the 2017 sci-fi short film The Privates, which was released on the YouTube short film channel omeleto in 2018. She appears in the video for "Seventeen" by Sharon Van Etten.
