= Rick Sebak =

American film director

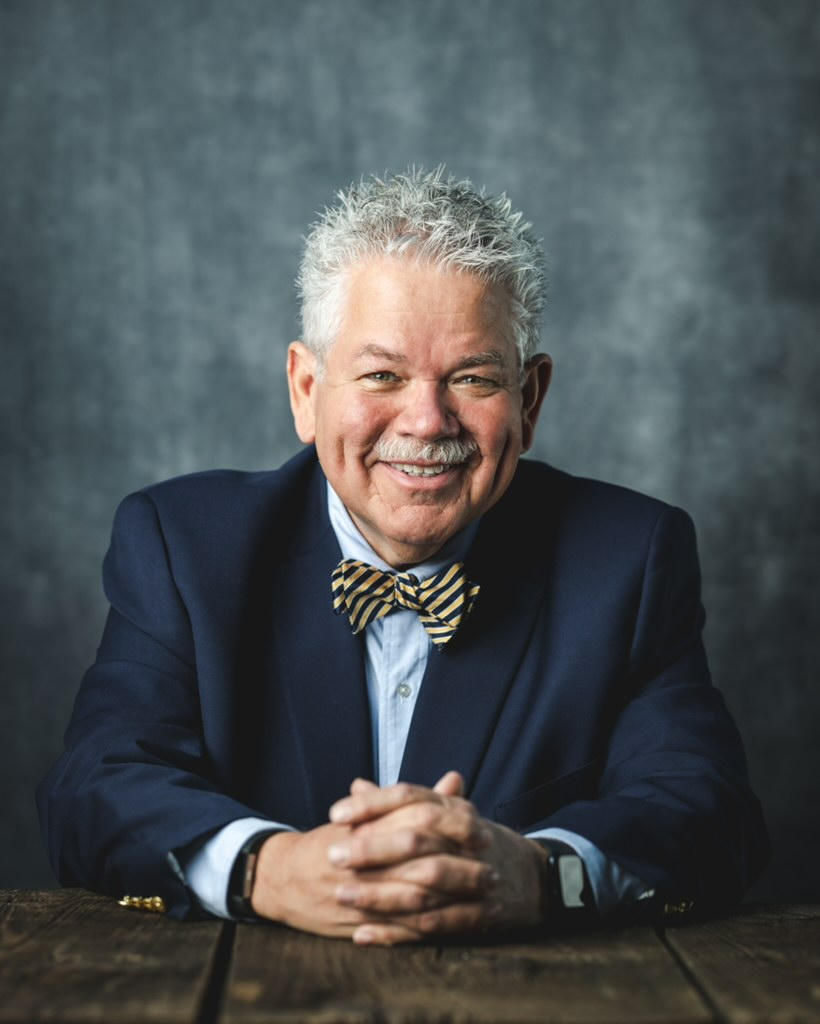
- Born: June 5, 1953 (age 73); Bethel Park, Pennsylvania, U.S.
- Occupations: Public television producer and host
- Known for: Documentaries

Richard Sebak (born June 5, 1953) is an American public broadcasting television producer, writer and narrator who lives and works in Pittsburgh, Pennsylvania, United States.

== Early life and education ==
Richard Sebak was born on June 5, 1953, in Bethel Park, Pennsylvania. He attended Bethel Park High School and the University of North Carolina at Chapel Hill, where he was a Phi Beta Kappa graduate.

== Career ==
Sebak's first foray in the nostalgia documentary is the 1984 documentary Shag for South Carolina ETV, about a dance popular in the region. Four years later at WQED, Sebak produced The Mon, The Al & The O, about the Monongahela, Allegheny, and Ohio rivers, which meet to form at Pittsburgh's Golden Triangle; and Kennywood Memories, about Kennywood, a historic local amusement park.

As of March 2006, 313,227 copies of Sebak's films had been sold or given away as pledge gifts by public television stations nationwide, which WQED credits with largely helping it become financially solvent. Sebak's scrapbook documentary format has been copied by other stations, many of whom see record pledge drive numbers when their documentaries air at pledge time.

For his 25th year at the station, WQED produced a program called What Makes Rick Tick. Special photos of Sebak to celebrate this 25th anniversary were added to Yinztagram. The City of Pittsburgh declared the 1st week of December "Rick Sebak Week."

Starting in 2018 the Rick Sebak specials for WQED have been shortened to 30 minutes and put under the umbrella title "Nebby: Rick Sebak's Tales of Greater Pittsburgh". Nebby is a Pittsburghese term meaning "nosy." Sebak fell and seriously injured his leg in 2018, and his special "Nebby: My Seven Weeks in Magee" showed his recovery and the support (and food) he received from many Pittsburghers. Due to Sebak's injury, 3 of the 8 episodes re-used 20 year old footage from older, out of circulation, documentaries with updates.

Sebak is the creator of the "scrapbook documentary" genre, many of which he has created for WQED and PBS. This scrapbook style incorporates many old films, home movies, postcards, old photos and memorabilia of all sorts. Sebak does not appear on-camera in these programs, but audiences have learned to recognize his voice and distinctive narrative style.

His work is supported by the Buhl Foundation.

== Filmography ==
PBS Documentaries running 60 minutes – Pittsburgh History Series unless marked
- The Mon, The Al & The O (1988)
- Kennywood Memories (1988)
- Holy Pittsburgh! (1989)
- Our Neighbor Fred Rogers (Two versions: 1989, 1990)
- Flying Off The Bridge To Nowhere! And Other Tales Of Pittsburgh Bridges (1990)
- Things That Aren’t There Anymore (1990)
- Downtown Pittsburgh (1992)
- The Pennsylvania Road Show (1992)
- Pennsylvania Diners And Other Roadside Restaurants (1993)
- Stuff That’s Gone (1994)
- Houses Around Here (1994)
- The Strip Show (1996)
- An Ice Cream Show (1996)
- Shore Things (1996) – All-American Series
- North Side Story (1997)
- South Side (1998)
- Things That Are Still Here (1999)
- A Hot Dog Program (1999) – All-American Series
- Great Old Amusement Parks (1999) – All-American Series
- Something About Oakland (2000)
- Pittsburgh A To Z (2001)
- A Flea Market Documentary (2001) – All-American Series
- Sandwiches That You Will Like (2002) – All-American Series
- Happy Holidays in Pittsburgh (2002)
- Things We've Made (2003)
- Fred Rogers: America's Favorite Neighbor (2003)
- It's the Neighborhoods (2004)
- A Program About Unusual Buildings & Other Roadside Stuff is a 2004 PBS All-American Series documentary that showcases mimetic and novelty buildings across the United States.
- A Cemetery Special (2005) – All-American Series
- What Makes Pittsburgh Pittsburgh (2006)
- Underground Pittsburgh (2007)
- To Market To Market To Buy A Fat Pig (2007) – All-American Series
- Invented, Engineered, and Pioneered in Pittsburgh (2008)
- A Ride Along the Lincoln Highway (2008) – All-American Series
- Right Beside the River (2009)
- Breakfast Special (July 2010) – All-American Series
- Breakfast Special 2: Revenge of the Omelets (November 2012) – All-American Series
- 25 Things I Like About Pittsburgh (2012)
- A History of Pittsburgh in 17 Objects (2014)
- A Few Good Pie Places (2015) – All-American Series
- A Few Great Bakeries (2015) – All-American Series
- Return to Downtown Pittsburgh (2016)

NEBBY: RICK SEBAK'S TALES OF GREATER PITTSBURGH: This series of public TV programs are stand alone documentaries. While the word "nebby" means "nosey" or "inquisitive" to most native Pittsburghers, many of whom have known a "nebby neighbor" for years, the series is an unpredictable mix of topic. They are available on WQED's website for streaming. https://www.wqed.org/watch/nebby-rick-sebaks-tales-greater-pittsburgh

- A Short History Of Route 88 (2018). New 30 minute documentary about rural route 88 and its locals.
- Meat Pittsburgh (2018) New 30 minute documentary about meat from the Pittsburgh region--its origins, processing & preparation.
- People Who've Written Books Around Here (2018) New 30minute documentary about Pittsburgh authors.
- Pittsburgh Vintage Mixer (2018). New 30 minute documentary about Pittsburgh's Mixer Party.
- That Kennywood Summer (2019) 30 minutes of footage shot for 1988's "Kennywood Memories"
- Don't Stand Up (2019) 30 minutes of footage shot for 1988's "Kennywood Memories"
- My Interview With Fred (2019) 30 minute interview shot for 1989's "Our Neighbor Fred Rogers"
- My Seven Weeks in Magee (2019). New 30 minute documentary. After a fall that ruptured his left quadriceps tendon, Rick had to have surgery and then began a long, slow recovery. He spent time at a “skilled nursing facility” to recuperate. Now he has made a new program for his popular crowd-funded NEBBY series that details the trials and tribulations (but primarily the delicious joys) of what he calls “My Seven Weeks In Magee.”

== Home video ==
- The PITTSBURGH HISTORY SERIES (WQED Multi-media)- From the start, 1988, as each new documentary was produced VHS tapes were made as "Thank You" gifts for WQED supporters and sold at specialty stores throughout Pittsburgh. In 2002 releases switched over to the new popular DVD format. WQED re-issued all but two of the VHS shows onto DVD with new bonus material under the "WQED Classics" banner. "The Mon, The Al & The O" got combined with "Flying Off The Bridge to Nowhere..." for their DVD re-issue. "Holy Pittsburgh" never got re-issued. "Our Neighbor Fred Rogers'(1989) was updated and re-titled to "Fred Rogers, America's Favorite Neighbor"(2003) for the DVD release. VHS tapes were sold as long as stock remained, but no new dubs were made. NONE of these documentaries were made available for video streaming.
- The ALL-AMERICAN SERIES (PBS Home Video) – 1996 to 2002 Documentaries were sold on VHS Tape. 2003 PBS Home Video switched over to DVD. The VHS documentaries were re-issued on DVD with bonus material, later the first four were collected as one set. To date, July 2021, all of the PBS Home Video DVDs are still available, although their website indicates less than 10 copies of each title is in stock. NONE of these documentaries are currently available for video streaming.
- NEBBY: RICK SEBAK'S TALES OF GREATER PITTSBURGH – 2018 & 2019 After their broadcast these Half Hour Documentaries were posted on both WQED and PBS websites for video streaming.
