= The Bottle District, St Louis =

Area of St. Louis in Missouri, US

Coordinates: 38°38′09″N 90°11′15″W

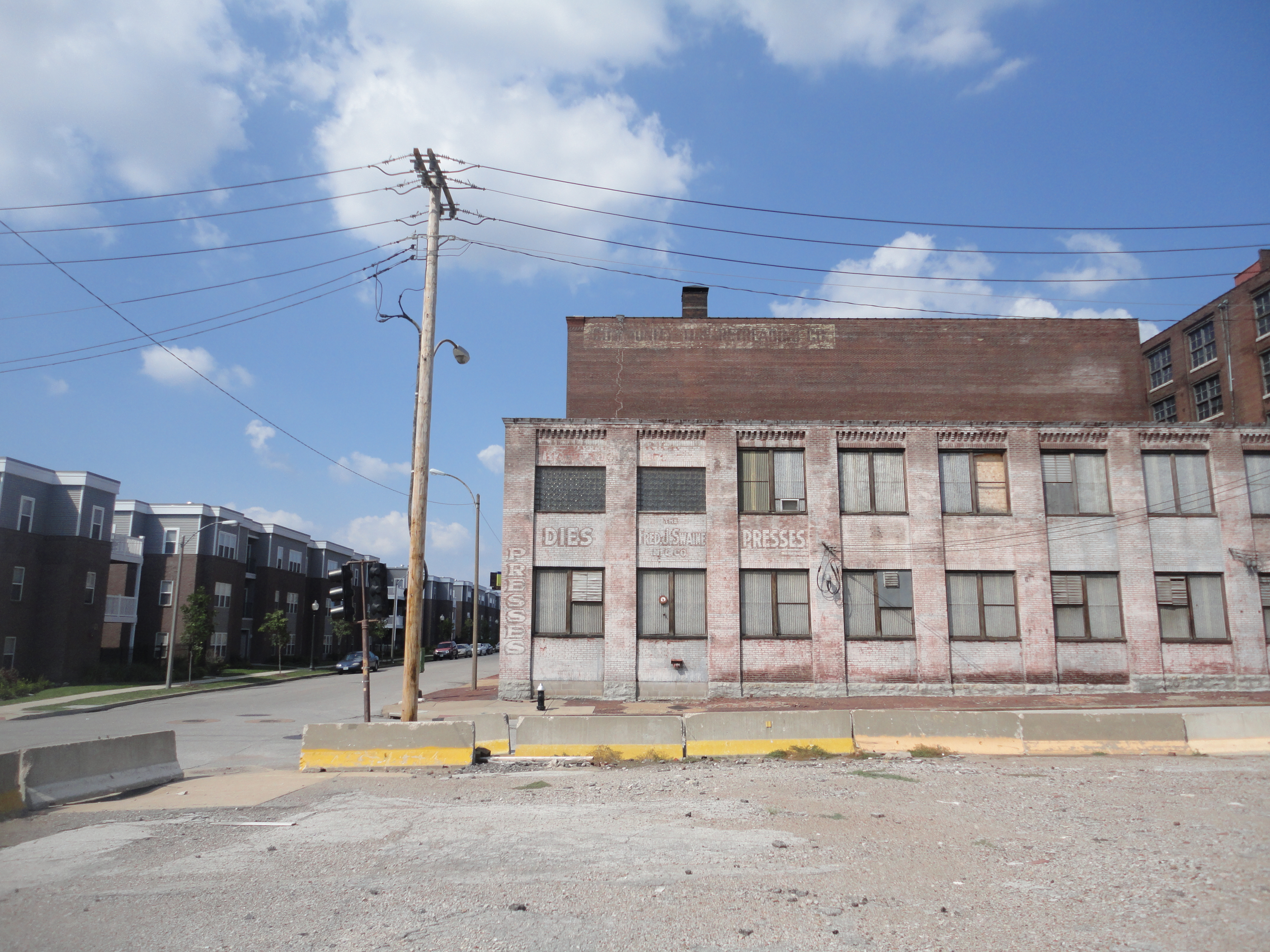
Building in The Bottle District, August 2010

The Bottle District was a six-block, 17-acre area north of Downtown St. Louis, Missouri, that was being redeveloped as a mixed-use entertainment and residential district. It sat north of the city's convention center and west of Laclede's Landing.

== History ==
The area is part of the old Kerry Patch neighborhood, which was home to thousands of Irish immigrants in the 19th century. The neighborhood gradually became more industrial and was noted in the 1920s for its animal stockyards and bottling companies.

In 2004, neighborhood business McGuire Moving and Storage Company announced plans to redevelop the district as an entertainment destination. The area was named "Bottle District" in recognition of the 34-foot-tall (10 m) bottle-shaped advertisement for Vess Soda that was installed in 1989. Noted architect Daniel Libeskind was hired to design the district with the Ghazi Company of Charlotte, North Carolina as co-developer.

A groundbreaking ceremony was held on September 27, 2005, with plans for the first phase to open in 2007. The plans called for a Rawlings Sports museum, a Grand Prix Speedways kart-racing center, a boutique bowling alley, 250 residential units, and several restaurants. The first phase of the development was anticipated to cost $290 million, to be funded in part by $51.3 million in tax increment financing.

In late 2011, the St. Louis Board of Aldermen approved the transfer of the unused $51.3 million to a new developer, Paul McKee's NorthSide Regeneration LLC. The deal would see the previous investment group, including developers Larry Chapman and Bob Clark, sell the site to NorthSide for an undisclosed amount that documents with the city suggest would be $3 million; all three were to work to find tenants and build on the site. Construction on a $190 million office and residential project was to begin in summer 2012.

In 2018, the city of St Louis severed its ties with McKee’s Northside Regeration LLC. In 2025, fire swept through the McGuire building, forcing the city to demolish the structure. Estimated costs to demolish were said to be around $1.5M. The land is currently still vacant, with the city and McKee engaged in legal battles.

== See also ==
- Vess
