= Iván Argote =

Colombian artist and filmmaker

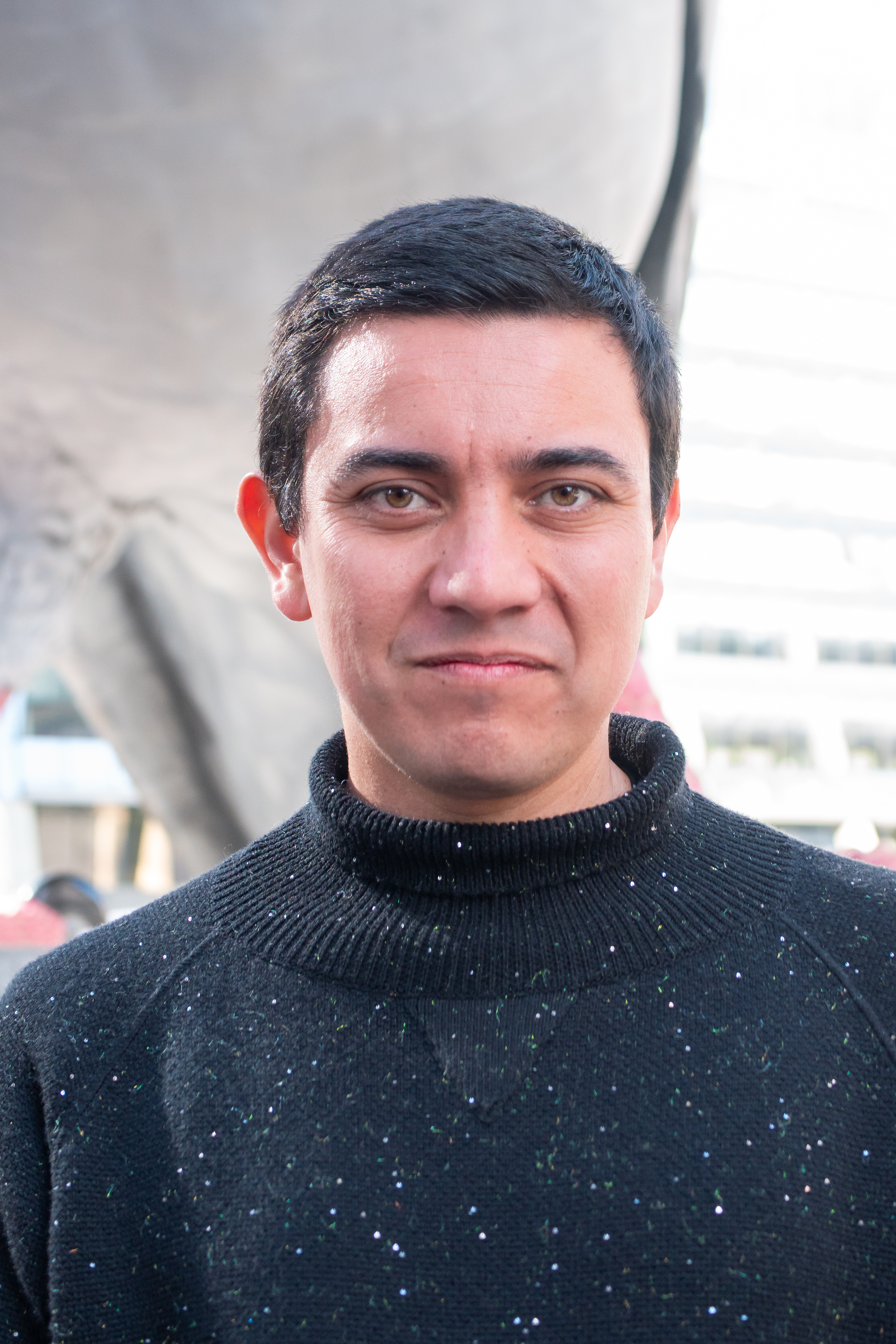
- Born: 1983 (age 42–43); Bogotá, Colombia
- Education: National University of Colombia; Beaux-Arts de Paris (MFA, 2009)

Iván Argote (born 1983) is a Colombian artist and filmmaker based in Paris. Using humor and staged interventions, his performance pieces and installations challenge dominant political ideologies.

== Biography ==
Iván Argote was born in Bogotá, Colombia, in 1983, and was raised in a family of militants who were heavily involved in the armed conflicts during La Violencia. As a result, he became a human rights activist focusing his artwork on social justice issues. Argote's awareness of historical processes and social policies (particularly in Colombia) are what informs his work. At the age of 22, he worked as assistant director at Colombo Films in Bogotá where he learned about filmmaking, video, and photography. Until 2005, Argote had been living in Colombia where he spent time studying Graphic Design at the National University of Colombia. Soon after graduating, he moved to Paris, and made it his home. The move gave Argote the opportunity to meet Emmanuel Perrotin, a French gallery owner, who inspired him to seek a career in the art world. Argote's collaborations with Perrotin started his art career. In 2011, his first collaboration was his first solo exhibition at Galerie Perrotin in Paris called Caliente. Over the years, he has had several show and screenings at Galerie Perrotin, including his 22-minute film As Far As We Could Get (2017) which features people from two antipodes, the town of Palembang in Indonesia and the city of Neiva in Columbia. The resulting work is a commentary on transnational cultural relations. He works primarily in mediums of sculpture, installations, and videography.

== Education ==
Argote studied visual arts and design at the National University of Colombia. He later attended the Beaux-Arts de Paris in Paris, and graduated with his MFA in 2009.

== Artwork ==
=== Strengthlessness, 2014 ===
In 2014, Argote worked on Strengthlessness, a sculpture created from concrete, wood, and gold leaf. The construction of this sculpture continued his theme of modification of the normal world. It is an obelisk, similar to the one at the Place de la Concorde, but limp, a phallic image turned impotent. In an interview with France 24, Argote explains the true meaning as "Small fight against images of power."

=== Barcelona, 2014 ===
The five-minute video, Barcelona took place in eponymous Barcelona, Spain, and shows Argote's view on colonization. In the conceptual video, a statue of a missionary priest is depicted relation to an indigenous man and Argote lights the statue on fire.

=== Ideologically Yours, 2017 ===
From 2014-2017, Argote worked on the concrete sculpture which was named Ideologically Yours, one of the many works exhibited at the Venice Biennale. In Ideologically Yours, Argote figuratively and literally brings a shattered world into a new environment by making note of its destroyed features. Using a destroyed black and grey wall, Argote described it as, "piece of a world that was destroyed."

=== Dinosaur, 2024 ===
In October 2024, Argote's Dinosaur sculpture was installed along New York City’s High Line as the fourth commission for High Line's Plint program. The sculpture is of a colossal, hyper-realistic cast-aluminum sculpture of a feral pigeon. The sculpture itself is 16 ft (4.9 metres) tall, sitting on the permanent 5 ft (1.5 metres) concrete plinth.

Argote stated that the work's title is a reference to its scale as well as the pigeon's evolutionary ancestors, who "millions of years ago dominated the globe, as we humans do today."

The statue is scheduled to be removed in early April 2026. On March 21, 2026, a farewell party was held with Argote in attendance.

== Select group exhibitions ==
- 2005 - Photographic 217; Colombia's National University of Colombia, Bogotá, Colombia
- 2016 - An Idea of Progress, London, England
- 2017 - Continua Sphères ENSEMBLE, Le Centquatre-Paris, Paris, France
- 2017 - Ideologically Yours on What We Feel, How We Feel It, Venice Biennale, Venice, Italy
- 2018 - The Street. Where the World Is Made, MAXXI, Rome, Italy
- 2019 - Desert X, Coachella Valley, California

== Select solo exhibitions ==
- 2011 - Caliente, Galerie Perrotin, Paris, France
- 2013 - Tompkins, 18th Street Arts Center, Los Angeles, USA
- 2014 - EspaiDos, Sala Muncunill, Barcelona, Spain
- 2016 - Kepple, The Standard Hotel, New York, USA
- 2017 - Somos, Galeria Vermelho, Sao Paulo, Brazil
- 2019 - Juntos Together, Arizona State University Arizona, USA
- 2025 - Una lucha de paisajes, Galeria Albarrán Bourdais, Madrid, Spain

== Collections ==
Argote's work can be found in the collections of major metropolitan museums including the Centre Pompidou and the Centre national des arts plastiques.

== Honors and awards ==
- First Prix 2005, National Salon of Young Art, First Prix 2008, Create the "Canal +" ad, Canal, First Prix, Intervenciones TV
- Prix Sam Art Projects, Politic Science Prize for contemporary art, Ecole de Sciences Politiques, 2011
- First Prix, Audie talents awards Art contemporain, 2013
- CIFO Cisneros Fontanais Foundation Prize, 2015
- Future Generation Art Prize, PinchukArtCentre, 2017
