= Herman Trachtenberg =

Herman Trachtenberg (German Isaakovich Trakhtenberg) (1839 Zhytomyr, Volyn - 1895 Zhytomyr) was a famous Jewish jurist.

He studied law at the University of St. Petersburg, and at the end of his course entered the government service. For meritorious work he was granted the Order of Stanislaus of the third degree and that of Vladimir of the fourth degree, thus gaining the rights and privileges of a hereditary citizen. He was noted for his compilations of briefs on criminal cases. At the end of the seventies he was accorded the rare honor of being elected honorary justice of the peace for the district of St. Petersburg.

Trachtenberg always took an active interest in the affairs of the Jewish community of St. Petersburg, and in 1891 devoted much time and energy to the case of the Starodub Jews, who were victims of the anti-Jewish riots.

== Bibliography ==
- "Khronika Voskhoda", 1895, No. 34.
