= Novella 2000 =

Italian women's and celebrity magazine

- Categories: Women's magazine; Celebrity magazine
- Frequency: Weekly
- Circulation: 3,700 (June 2023)
- Publisher: RCS Pubblicità
- Founded: 1919; 107 years ago
- Company: RCS MediaGroup
- Country: Italy
- Based in: Milan
- Language: Italian
- Website: Novella 2000
- ISSN: 1120-4443
- OCLC: 317934485

Novella 2000 is a weekly celebrity and women's magazine published in Milan, Italy. Founded in 1919, it is one of the oldest publications in the country. It is also one of the most read and well-known Italian gossip magazines.

== History and profile ==
It was established as a literary magazine with the name Novella (Italian: Short Story) in 1919. The magazine was started as a notebook-sized publication, and the publisher was Casa Editrice Italia. As of 1926 it was published on a monthly basis, and its editor was Guido Cantini. In 1927 the magazine was acquired by the Rizzoli, now RCS MediaGroup, which is still the owner of the magazine. Like other Rizzoli magazines it was printed in a certain color which was purple for Novella. During this period it featured fiction narratives and short stories. It also published work by Italian intellectuals, including Gabriele D’Annunzio and Luigi Pirandello. Filippo Piazzi contributed to the magazine between 1934 and 1935.

The magazine was relaunched in 1967 as a gossip magazine. This drastic transformation which was done by the director of the magazine, Guido Cantini, was a business success. Following this the magazine began to publish a monthly supplement entitled I Romanzi di Novella which was a best-selling romance series.

Novella 2000 is published by RCS Pubblicità, magazine division of RCS MediaGroup, on a weekly basis in Milan and features articles on celebrity gossip and scandalous events. Its content is mostly accompanied by paparazzi photographs. The weekly is one of the Italian magazines which published Lady Diana's photographs in her final moments in September 1997.

=== Circulation ===
The circulation of the magazine was 300,000 copies in the period 1952–1953. In 1984 Novella 2000 had a circulation of 365,256 copies. From December 2002 to November 2003 its average circulation was down to 174,095 copies. In 2007 the weekly sold 146,030 copies.

== See also ==
- List of magazines in Italy
