= Mammy's Cupboard =

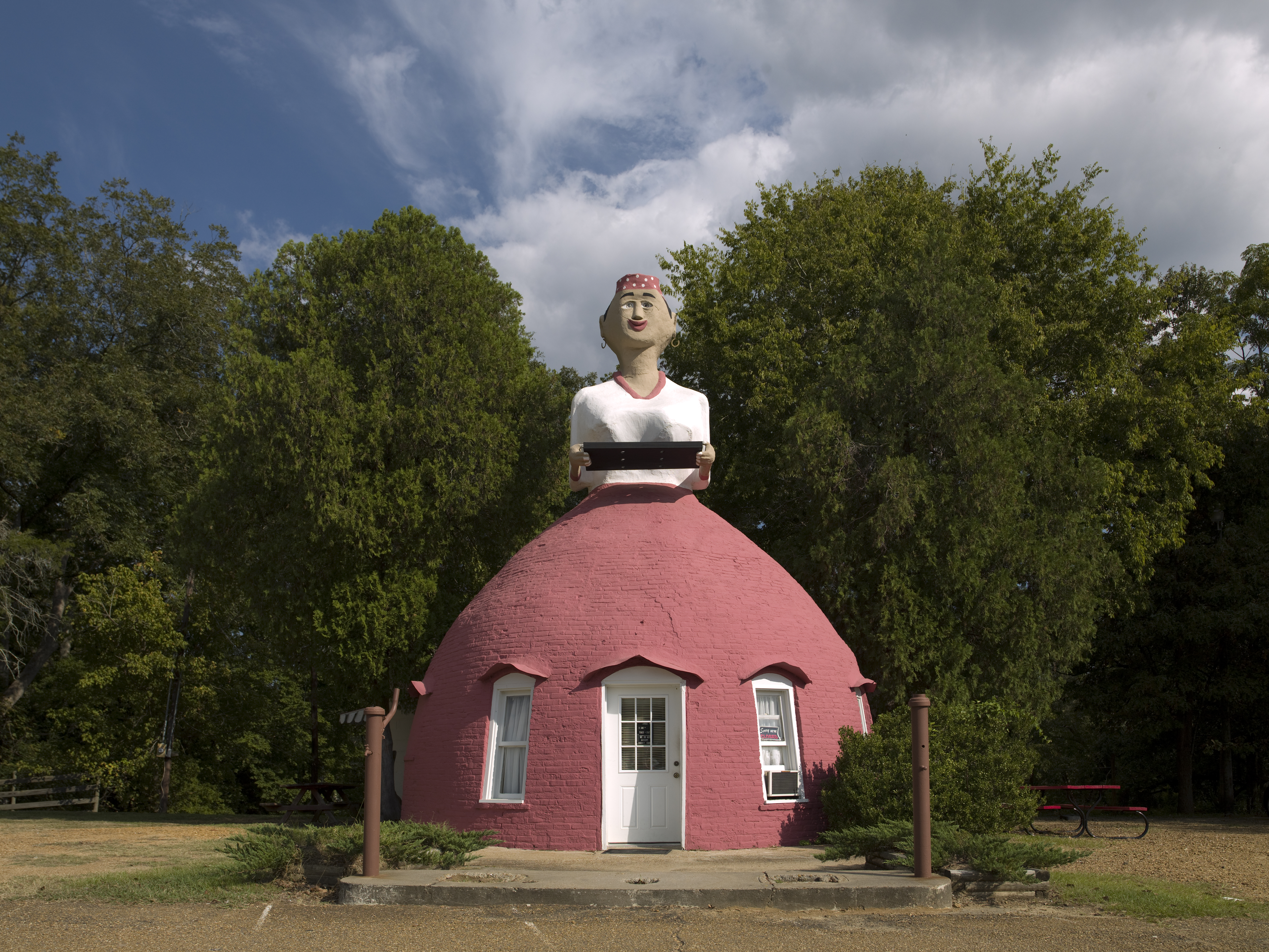
- Interactive map of the Mammy's Cupboard area

General information
- Type: Restaurant
- Architectural style: Novelty architecture
- Location: 555 U.S. 61, near Natchez, Mississippi, United States
- Coordinates: 31°28′41″N 91°22′17″W
- Opened: 1940

Height
- Height: 28 ft (8.5 m)

Mammy's Cupboard (founded 1940) is a roadside restaurant built in the shape of a mammy archetype, located on US Highway 61 south of Natchez, Mississippi. The woman's skirt holds a dining room and a gift shop. The skirt is made out of bricks, and the earrings are horseshoes. She is holding a serving tray while smiling. Mammy's Cupboard has been through several renovations; the exterior has been repaired and the interior refurbished. The restaurant currently serves various lunches and desserts.

== History ==
The restaurant's founder was originally a tour guide of Natchez's nearby antebellum mansions and she believed tourists would also be interested in this type of restaurant. Also a mammy character had been portrayed in the very popular 1939 film Gone with the Wind, about the same time plans for the restaurant were being made. During the Civil Rights Movement of the 1960s the Mammy's skin was repainted a lighter shade. The current owner said of the Mammy, "There is honor in everything you do and for those who have young people. You have a crying child. Who are they going to run to? Nine times out of ten, they are going to run to the mammy. ... I want people to look at her and see that."

The author of Crossings: A White Man's Journey Into Black America described the restaurant as "a massive statue—twenty-eight feet [8.5 m] high—of a black woman dressed like Aunt Jemima, wearing a red scarf, a white blouse, and a red hoopskirt that actually houses a restaurant", while the authors of Frommer's USA said that if you want to visit the restaurant, "you need to check your political correctness at the door". The restaurant's homemade pie was covered in the book American Pie and the newspaper The Press Democrat for National Pie Day.
