= Erikavision =

EP by Erika Vikman
- Released: May 16, 2025
- Label: Warner Music Finland, Mökkitie Records

Erikavision is an EP released on May 16, 2025, by the Finnish singer Erika Vikman. The EP contains songs that Vikman had already released as well as the new release "Syntisten Hard Rock Hallelujah". The EP was released physically only as a CD and on vinyl.

The EP rose to 18th place on Finland's Official Album List and first place for physical releases.

== Track listing ==
1. Ich komme
2. Ich komme (Roos+Berg Remix)
3. Syntisten Hard Rock Hallelujah
4. Cicciolina
5. Syntisten pöytä
6. Myynnissä
