= Pornography in Europe =

Pornography has been dominated by a few pan-European producers and distributors, the most notable of which is the Private Media Group that successfully claimed the position previously held by Color Climax Corporation in the early 1990s. Most European countries also have local pornography producers, from Portugal (e.g. Naturalvideo) to Albania, who face varying levels of competition with international producers. The legal status of pornography varies widely in Europe; its production and distribution are illegal in countries such as Ukraine, Belarus and Bulgaria, while Hungary has permissive pornography laws.

== Albania ==
In Albania, pornography is illegal only for producing, delivery, advertising, import, selling and publication of pornographic materials in persons under 18 years old. Child pornography is strictly prohibited.

== Austria ==
Austrian legislation on pornography has its roots in legal efforts dating back to 1715 to suppress obscene writings and objects, which became increasingly widespread with the advent of printing. The reason for enacting the pornography law was that the catastrophe of World War II had not only crippled the economy, but also led to a shake-up of traditional views on customs and morals. The law was intended to set boundaries of decency and propriety in the interest of orderly coexistence. It serves to restrict the satisfaction of sexual desire, as purely erotic works have an intoxicating effect similar to that of drugs, arousing the subconscious urges of young people. It was considered a great injustice that had to be combated to use the superiority of the instinct for self-preservation and procreation for financial gain. Since its adoption in 1950, the content of the law has not been amended, but it has been increasingly liberalized by the courts. Due to its age, it has been criticized on several occasions as outdated and in need of reform. In 1994 a prohibition on child pornography was added to the law. Under these regulations the minimum age for buying hardcore pornography is 16. Publication of pornography or material depicting bestiality is illegal.

== Belarus ==
Pornography is illegal in Belarus. Production, distribution, promotion, exhibition as well as possession with intent of distribution or promotion of pornographic materials or objects of pornographic nature is punished by Belarusian criminal law and results in compulsory community service, fine or up to 4 years imprisonment.

== Bulgaria ==
In the People's Republic of Bulgaria (1946–1990) pornography was only available to a comparatively limited number of people. What pornographic materials there were (mostly magazines and videocassettes) were smuggled into the country. The abandonment of censorship in the early post-communist period resulted in pornography becoming widely available. In the early 1990s pornographic magazines were sold at newsstands, pirated foreign pornographic videocassettes became available and foreign pornographic television stations were accessible. The first Bulgarian pornographic film was made in 1992.

The production and distribution of pornography is illegal in Bulgaria. The filming of pornography and the online distribution of sexual content are illegal. There are no Bulgarian pornographic production companies. Accessing, possessing or storing pornographic materials is not illegal (except for child pornography).

The penalty for production or distribution of pornography is up to one year imprisonment (or up to two years if the perpetrator used the Internet) and a fine of 1000 to 3,000 leva. The penalty for distribution or possession of child pornography is up to one year imprisonment or a fine of up to 2,000 leva. Authorities tolerate illegal distribution of hardcore porn in designated shops, and on television after 11:00 p.m. Softcore material is rarely censored. Magazines and pornographic papers have become increasingly available since the fall of communism in 1989, and local editions of many international porn magazines are published. Society is often exposed to sexual content in advertising.

== Czech Republic ==
Pornography in the Czech Republic was legalized in 1993 following the Velvet Revolution, when the country ceased to be a communist state and returned to liberal democracy. Among the Czech companies that produce pornography are LegalPorno Studios, based in Prague.

The sale and distribution of child pornography is illegal and is punishable by imprisonment for up to 3 years. Possession of child pornography was made illegal in 2007 and carries a penalty of up to 2 years in prison. The Czech penal code also bans the sale and distribution of pornography depicting sexual intercourse with an animal and pornography depicting violence or disrespect to human beings, with a penalty of up to 1 year in prison.

== Denmark ==
A ban on pornographic literature was lifted in 1967. In 1969, Denmark became the first country in the world to legalize pornography. People in Denmark have free access to pornography. Pornography including minors younger than 18 years is prohibited since 1980, and possession of the same is also illegal.

== Estonia ==
Pornography is legal and distribution or production is regulated by law.

== Finland ==
In Finland, child pornography is illegal, along with violent and bestial pornography. It is legal to sell pornography in any store, but magazines may not be sold to buyers less than 16 years of age, and hardcore is restricted to buyers aged at least 18.

Prior to 1 January 1999, all indecent publishing, including the import and export thereof, was banned.

== France ==
In France, pornography is overall permitted, but with distinctions:

- Hardcore pornography must not be sold to persons under the age of 18.
- Softcore pornography must not be sold to persons under the age of 16.
- Extremely violent or graphic pornography is considered X-rated, and so may be shown only in specific theaters, and may not be displayed to minors.
- Some pornography has a special VAT (value-added tax): a 33% tax is levied on X-rated movies, and a 50% excise is placed on pornographic online services.

The ratings system has caused controversy. For example, in 2000 the sexually explicit and violent film Baise-moi was initially rated only as "restricted" by the French government. This classification was overturned by a Conseil d'État ruling in a lawsuit brought by associations supporting Christian and family values.

Some movies are forbidden to persons under the age of 18, without the requirement for an X rating, such as Baise-moi, Ken Park or Saw 3, so that these movies can be viewed in theaters and not attract VAT.

== Germany ==
The constitution and laws of Germany are very strict about hardcore pornography, especially when compared to its very liberal laws about softcore pornography, prostitution and sex shops. Supplying hardcore pornography to people who are less than 18 years old is an offence, and shops selling it must keep people under the age of 18 from entering their premises. If only a part of the shop is dedicated to pornography, it must be completely closed off from the rest of the premises. Alternatively, shops may choose not to display their goods or advertise that they sell them, in which case minors may be admitted. Websites hosting pornographic material within Germany must comply with rules about verifying that viewers are over 18.

Softcore pornography is less restricted, and may even be broadcast on TV at night. The age threshold is usually FSK-16. In contrast many uncut action films or video games easily reach the FSK-18 rating.

Pornography is legal with the exception of child pornography. German prosecution authorities and legal bodies of Germany's sixteen states handle the definition of child pornography very differently. The German Edathy affair of 2013–14 following the neglected cooperation of BKA within the Canadian child pornography uncoverings gave way for new legislation procedures in parliament to define the status of either posing or exhibitive pictures of minors. New laws were still in parliamentary debating as recently as 19 December 2014.

== Greece ==
Pornography in Greece is legal by selling or publishing material, but it is illegal to minors under 18 years old. Despite the fact, the practice is still commonly done because the law is weakly enforced. Pornographic material is sold in sex shops, DVD-clubs, mini markets, and kiosk shops. There is also a local pornographic production which began unofficially in the 1970s, which then became official and full legal since 2008. Child pornography is illegal and is punished by imprisonment and monetary penalties.

== Hungary ==
Pornography is generally legal in Hungary. In Hungary, the production of pornography mainly dates from the period after the fall of communism in 1989. The production and distribution of pornography was illegal under communism, but the laws were liberalised with the emergence of democracy. Permissive government policies soon propelled the country to the forefront of the European pornography industry. Several foreign directors were attracted to the country's liberal legislation, cheap production costs and large supply of attractive female performers. Eventually, domestic producers began to prosper as well, and several female actresses made big names for themselves within the industry. Hungarian pornography is different from that produced in America in the more natural appearance of its performers. The sex scenes also tend to be more extreme, with frequent use of anal sex and various forms of multiple penetration.

In 2021 Hungary's parliament passed a law that bans display or promote pornography, including gender change or homosexuality to anyone under 18 years old.

== Iceland ==
The production or sale of pornography is prohibited in Iceland. Heavy fines were applied in 2001 and ten years earlier a fine was applied to the first manager of the first private TV station (and the only case to present) in Iceland for showing the Danish "mainstream" Zodiac-films, I Tvillingernes tegn and I Tyrens tegn. In early 2013 there was a draft proposal by Ögmundur Jónasson, the Minister of the Interior, to extend the ban to online pornography to protect children from violent sexual imagery. The plan has been stalled since the change in government during the parliamentary election on 27 April 2013. Since then, there have been no changes to the relevant legislation, and no changes have been formally proposed.

Publication of pornography is illegal in Iceland, and is punishable by a fine or imprisonment for up to 6 months. Publication of child pornography is punishable by a fine or imprisonment for up to 2 years. In 2013 the Icelandic government proposed banning violent Internet pornography and Iceland's parliament began debating a ban on online pornography.

== Ireland ==
Other than laws against it, no laws against it exist. Other than regulations regarding pornographic movies, no laws against pornography, other than child pornography (a child is defined as someone under 17), exist.

=== Censorship of pornogaphy ===
Pornography that includes any participants being beneath the Irish age of consent [which is 17 years old] is strictly illegal. This includes videos, DVD, film, photographs, digital files, drawings and text descriptions. There are no other laws banning specific types of pornography in Ireland. However, distribution of obscene material by the telephone network can be prosecuted under the Post Office (Amendment) Act of 1951, the Director of Film Classification at the Irish Film Classification Office may ban public display of films considered to be obscene, and the Censorship of Publications Board may prohibit the sale and distribution of books and periodicals if they are found to be obscene. In the 1960s, Roman Catholic Archbishop of Dublin John Charles McQuaid lobbied the Irish government to have pornography banned outright.

The government-controlled IE Domain Registry currently has a ban on all domain names it considers "offensive or contrary to public policy or generally accepted principles of morality". In particular, the domains pornography.ie and porn.ie are known to be banned.

== Italy ==
In Italy, it is illegal to distribute pictorial or video pornography to persons under the age of 18. However, persons over 18 years of age are permitted to view pornographic material. Although Italy had accumulated a lot of softcore pornography in the 1970s, hardcore pornography was not a usual trend until the 1980s. The first pornographic film in Italy was Il Telefono rosso (The red telephone) in 1983 by Riccardo Schicchi with Ilona Staller (aka "Cicciolina"). The film caused much controversy and it was restrained from legal release until 1986 with an alternate revision of Italian censorship laws.

== Latvia ==
In Latvia, the distribution of pornographic material is allowed under very similar legal conditions as in Poland. Pornographic or erotic material is rarely to never sold in places accessible to general public.

== Lithuania ==
Lithuania has some of the strictest laws on pornography. Distribution, production and acquisition of pornographic material is prohibited by Article 309 of the country's Criminal Code which states in section 1 that "A person who, for the purpose of distribution, produces or acquires pornographic material or distributes such material shall be punished by community service or by a fine or by restriction of liberty or by imprisonment for a term of up to one year".

== Malta ==
In Malta, pornography and obscene material was prohibited until the latter part of 2016, regardless of whether it was for commercial purposes or whether it was directed at an adult audience. The relevant law in this respect was Article 208 (1) of the Criminal Code of Malta which prohibited the manufacture, print, importation, circulation and exportation of pornographic or obscene print, painting, photograph, film, book, card or writing, or any other obscene article whatsoever, whether for gain, or for distribution, or for display in a public place. In a decision given on 21 February 2011, the Maltese Court of Criminal Appeal upheld the criminal conviction of Mr. Alexander Baldacchino who was found guilty of exhibiting soft and hardcore pornographic films at the City Lights Theatre in Valletta. In another judgement, student editor Mark Camilleri and author Alex Vella Gera were found not guilty under Article 208 (1) of the Criminal Code and Article 7 of the Press Act (obscene libel) for the publication of an obscene story entitled Li Tkisser Sewwi (translated in English to 'Repair that which you break') in student newspaper Realtà (distributed for free on campus at the University of Malta) by the Court of Magistrates (Malta). The decision was upheld by the Court of Criminal Appeal.

In 2015, the Minister of Social Justice Owen Bonnici started to work on legislation to allow both services or art to create pornographic material while also giving official right to access pornographic material. By late 2016 the parliament of Malta allowed most pornographic material. Pornography involving minors and extreme forms of expression, including threats with the use of such material, remain illegal.

== Netherlands ==
Pornography is legal in the Netherlands.

- Article 240a indirectly prohibits giving pornographic pictures to children younger than 16 years. Maximum imprisonment is one year, or a fine of the 4th category (€19,500).
- Article 240b prohibits child pornography, which is defined as a picture showing a person younger than 18 performing sexual acts. Maximum imprisonment is 4 years or a fine of the 5th category (€78,000). It also prohibits making a profession or habit of it. The maximum imprisonment in that case is 6 years or a fine of the 5th category (€78,000).
- Article 248e prohibits online dating with minors (0–15 years old) in order to have sex or to make porn with them. The maximum imprisonment in that case is 2 years or a fine of the 4th category (€19,500).
- Article 254a prohibits bestiality porn. Maximum imprisonment is 6 months or a fine of the 3rd category (€7,800).

== Norway ==
Until 2023 porn was legal if it was accepted by media tilsynet, a government supervisor. After 2023 illegal porn follows very old rules related to porn, due to change in penal code section 317.

An adapted translation from Ot.prp. nr. 28 (1999-2000), pp. 127, gives distinction between illegal and legal porn:

"The decisive factor is whether the depiction is capable of giving rise to sexual associations. Mere nude images without any sexually charged context are therefore not covered. Depictions of ordinary sexual activity between adults may, depending on the circumstances, fall within the provision, cf. Rt. 1978 p. 1111. In that case, the Supreme Court held that the films in question were obscene despite the fact that they did not contain depictions involving children, animals, violence, coercion, or corpses."

== Poland ==
In Poland, as of September 1998, Article 202 of the national Penal Code makes pornography legal except for the production or possession of pornographic materials containing minors, bestiality (zoophilia), and "scenes of violence/rape". Also illegal is presenting or showing pornographic materials to people who do not want to have any contact with them, and to persons under 15 years of age.

== Portugal ==
In Portugal, hardcore pornographic movies can only be shown in adult cinemas. Videos and magazines are openly sold in newsstands but are forbidden by law to be supplied to minors under the age of 18 years. Additionally, hardcore pornographic movies are banned from open-channel TV and can only be broadcast through encrypted/pay-per-view channels.

Child pornography (i.e., pornography depicting children or juveniles below the age of 18) is illegal. Although the national age of consent is 14, the age of legal responsibility (i.e., the age a person can sign contracts consenting to appear in pornography) is 18.

== Romania ==
Romania legalized pornography in 2003. However, all pornographic sites hosted in the country must be locked with a password, and a tax per minute must be paid by the website owners. Production and distribution of pornography is legal, and regulated by the Law 196/13.05.2003. Child pornography is punishable with up from 1 to 5 years imprisonment, according to the article 374 of the Romanian Penal Code.

The status on zoophilic pornography is uncertain, as there are no laws that ban or at least, define it but the law says that all sites which feature paedophilia, necrophilia and zoophilia pornography are banned.

== Russia ==
According to Russian law, consumption of pornography is allowed though the production of it is not. The illegal production, distribution, and "public demonstration" of pornography is punishable by a 2- to 6-year prison term. Roskomnadzor, the Russian government's media overseer, has the power to order the blocking of pornographic websites. In 2015 the agency required the blocking of the Russian-language version of Pornhub and 10 other pornographic sites on the basis of a court ruling.

There is nevertheless some uncertainty concerning the legal status of pornography in Russia. The law criminalizes only the 'illegal' production and selling of pornography (which implies that it sometimes can be legal), but two issues make enforcement of the law difficult: there is no legal definition of pornography, and there is no law defining when production or selling is permitted.

== Slovakia ==
Pornography in Slovakia is legal for consenting adults, though the country has only a small domestic industry, most notably the gay pornography studio BelAmi, founded in Bratislava in 1993.

== Spain ==
Pornography was illegal in Francoist Spain, although some people travelled to France to see films such as Last Tango in Paris and some group tours to French X-rated cinemas were organised. For climate reasons, a number of Private movies were shot though not released in Spain.

The censorship of that period ended with Franco's death in 1975. For less than a year there was no censorship at all, and hardcore porn was sometimes shown in main cinemas. Subsequently the S-rating for films was introduced, allowing softcore pornography to be shown in mainstream cinemas. The film genre that arose was known as destape (undressing) and included popular films such as Las eróticas vacaciones de Stela (Stela's Erotic Vacations), El mundo maravilloso del sexo (The Marvellous World of Sex), Trampa sexual (Sexual Trap) and La orgía (The Orgy). The magazine Interviú, founded in 1976, had revealing covers of famous actresses and included nude photographs inside. In 1983 the S-rating was replaced by the more permissive X-rating.

== Sweden ==
Like Denmark and the Netherlands, Sweden does not regulate pornography and the country has no age laws for the possession or viewing of pornography. Some shops follow a voluntary limit and do not sell to minors. Material that involves animals is legal, though it is subject to animal-welfare laws. BDSM is classified as an "illegal depiction of violence" (olaga våldsskildring).

It is illegal for people under the age of 18 to act or pose for pornography in Sweden. Recording, downloading, distributing or watching pornographic photographs and films depicting children is a crime. Swedish child pornography laws outlaw actual photographic material as well as drawn images. The Supreme Court argued, however, that because a conviction would mean a restraint in the defendant’s freedom of expression, the court must present a serious case as to when pornographic manga-styled cartoon images like hentai or lolicon can have any potential to harm a child in any way. Since the images are usually not made in any child’s likeness and because e.g. manga was deemed an expression of Japanese culture, the Supreme Court ruled that the restraint on the defendant’s freedom of expression would be too great if it was punishable due to the images being held to constitute child pornography.

== Switzerland ==
Pornography in Switzerland is defined by the Article 197 of the Swiss criminal code. The first alinea states that «Any person who offers, shows, passes on or makes accessible to a person who is under the age of 16 pornographic documents, sound or visual recordings, depictions or other articles of a similar nature or pornographic representations, or broadcasts any of the same on radio or television is liable to a custodial sentence not exceeding three years or to a monetary penalty.» Furthermore, it is illegal to produce, import, store, market, advertise, exhibit, offer, show, pass on or make accessible pornography that depicts sexual acts involving children (under 18 years old) or animals, human excrement, or acts of violence, called "hard pornography".

Since July 2014, human excrement and urine are not considered being "hard pornography" anymore. Until June 2014, actors aged 16 and above could participate in a pornography production; however, since July 2014, the age of participation was raised to eighteen. This is due to the Swiss ratification of the Lanzarote Convention.

The age of viewing pornography stays fixed at 16 years old (Art. 197 al. 1 of the Swiss criminal code).

The same materials cited above are nevertheless not regarded as pornographic if they have a cultural or scientific value that justifies their protection by law.

== Turkey ==
Turkey, which is a formally secular state with a Muslim majority, was the first country to legally produce pornographic materials in the Muslim world. After a long period of producing Italian-inspired softcore comedies in the 1970s, the hardcore film Öyle Bir Kadın Ki was distributed in 1979.

== Ukraine ==
Pornography was outlawed in Ukraine in 2009 when the president Victor Yushchenko signed new legislation. The law has been overwhelmingly approved by the Verkhovna Rada (the Ukrainian parliament). The possession, distribution, sale and manufacture of pornographic materials are illegal. Possession of pornographic material can carry a fine or up from three to five years imprisonment. Pornography is defined by the law as "vulgar, candid, cynical, obscene depiction of sexual acts, pursuing no other goal, the explicit demonstration of genitals, unethical elements of the sexual act, sexual perversions, realistic sketches that do not meet moral criteria and offend honor and dignity of the human by inciting low instincts". Pornography for "medical purposes" remains legal.

Wiska, one of Ukraine's internationally known pornstars, alleges continuous and unconstitutional persecution for her work abroad, and has unsuccessfully applied for political asylum in the European Union.

Ukrainian lawmakers have plans and propose to legalize pornography in 2020s following Invasion of Ukraine and Tax refunds. In 2025 an online petition calling for decriminalization of pornography was published on the official website of the President of Ukraine and was supported by over 25,000 users. Ukrainian president Volodymyr Zelenskyi reacted by directing proposals voiced in the petition to the Verkhovna Rada in order for it to consider possible changes in legislation.

== United Kingdom ==
The main legislation on pornographic materials is the Obscene Publications Act 1959, the Obscene Publications Act 1964, the Indecent Displays (Control) Act 1981, and the Video Recordings Act 1984. Video-oriented depictions of hardcore pornographic material (with certain exceptions for works considered primarily "artistic" rather than pornographic) were banned until 1999, when the removal of trade barriers with other European Union member states allowed for the relatively free movement of such goods for personal use. Under terms set out in the Video Recordings Act 1984, all forms of pornographic material released on either DVD or video formats, within the United Kingdom must, as with all works released on such formats, first be classified by the British Board of Film Classification (BBFC).

"In Britain, where pornography is already more restricted than it is anywhere else in the English-speaking world or in Western Europe", wrote Avedon Carol in 1995, "sexual media is easily smeared for an audience that is seldom given an opportunity to see what really is sold under the name of 'pornography'". Under criminal law, the Sexual Offences Act 2003 (in England and Wales), the Sexual Offences (Scotland) Act 2009 (in Scotland), and the Sexual Offences (Northern Ireland) Order 2008 (in Northern Ireland), each make it a criminal offence for an adult to display pornographic material to a minor (a person under the age of 16).

Pornographic material released on DVD or video formats is required (under terms set out in the Video Recordings Act 1984) to be classified by the British Board of Film Classification (BBFC), who will generally place such material either at their assigned ‘18’ or ‘R18’ classifications. The Licensing Act 2003 requires that BBFC classifications be applied to adult works released in England and Wales, or Northern Ireland within a theatrical context. The British Board of Film Classification can, as with all works, issue compulsory cuts to pornographic material (generally when such material is in breach of either the Video Recordings Act 1984, the Obscene Publications Act 1959, and the Obscene Publications Act 1964, with current interpretation of such acts being incorporated into the guidelines which the BBFC as a whole, operate under). Without such cuts issued works can be refused classification (therefore barring the sale of such a work on DVD or video formats within the United Kingdom).

The current British legislative framework including the Obscene Publications Act 1959 (in England and Wales), the Civic Government (Scotland) Act 1982 (in Scotland) and the Video Recordings Act 1984 (which is applied nationwide) leads to a confusing situation in which there is a theoretical ban on the publication and distribution (but not possession) of pornographic material in any form, which is in practice unenforceable due to the vagueness of the legal test of material that "depraves and corrupts". In practice, hardcore material on video and DVD was until recently banned by the requirement under the Video Recordings Act to be certified by the BBFC, while mainstream hardcore material in other forms such as magazines and websites is essentially unrestricted.

Continental European, American and British hardcore pornographic magazines are now openly sold in many British newsagents, for instance. Due to liberalisation in BBFC policy, mainstream hardcore DVDs now receive R18 certificates, legalising them but restricting their sale to licensed sex shops such as those in Soho. Until it left the European Union on 1 January 2021, the UK was the only Member State of the EU to prohibit private imports of adult pornography by consumers coming from other Member States. In the 2004–2005 fiscal year, the agents of His Majesty's Revenue and Customs seized 96,783 items of pornographic media carried by people travelling into the UK. In 2008, the Crown Prosecution Service unsuccessfully prosecuted a man under the Obscene Publications Act (the R v Walker trial) for a textual story on a pornography website involving Girls Aloud. Also that year, the Home Office introduced legislation to criminalize possession of what it has labelled extreme pornography; these laws are now contained in sections 63 to 68 of the Criminal Justice and Immigration Act 2008. In 2019 the laws concerning extreme pornography were relaxed. The depiction of fetishes such as BDSM and humiliation is no longer likely to be prosecuted, provided the production is consensual and no harm is caused thereby, and the depiction does not promote criminality and is not aimed at minors. The Crime and Policing Act 2026 banned pornography in the United Kingdom if it shows suffocation, strangulation, or sexual roleplay involving people pretending to be closely related or "where a reasonable person would think at least one person is, or is pretending to be, under 16."

In 2005, the UK porn industry was estimated to be worth about £1 billion.

== See also ==
- Adult Film Database
- Pornography in the Americas
- Pornography in Asia
- Pornography laws by region
- Legality of child pornography
- Legality of bestiality
