= List of number-one singles of 2021 (Finland) =

This is the complete list of number-one singles in Finland in 2021 according to the Official Finnish Charts. The list on the left side of the box (Suomen virallinen singlelista, "the Official Finnish Singles Chart") represents physical and digital track sales as well as music streaming, and the one on the right side (Suomen virallinen radiosoittolista, "the Official Finnish Airplay Chart") represents airplay.

== Chart history ==
Official Finnish Singles Chart				Official Finnish Airplay Chart			
Issue date	Song	Artist(s)	Reference(s)	Issue date	Song	Artist(s)	Reference(s)
Week 1	"Treenaa"	Antti Tuisku		Week 1	"Frida"	Behm	
Week 2	"Without You"	The Kid Laroi		Week 2	"Frida"	Behm	
Week 3	"Drivers License"	Olivia Rodrigo		Week 3	"Frida"	Behm	
Week 4	"Drivers License"	Olivia Rodrigo		Week 4	"Frida"	Behm	
Week 5	"Drivers License"	Olivia Rodrigo		Week 5	"Syntisten pöytä"	Erika Vikman	
Week 6	"Drivers License"	Olivia Rodrigo		Week 6	"Dinosauruksii"	Ellinoora	
Week 7	"Me ei mennä rikki"	Gasellit (featuring Karri Koira)		Week 7	"Dinosauruksii"	Ellinoora	
Week 8	"Dark Side"	Blind Channel		Week 8	"Dinosauruksii"	Ellinoora	
Week 9	"Piilotan mun kyyneleet"	Haloo Helsinki!		Week 9	"Dinosauruksii"	Ellinoora	
Week 10	"Piilotan mun kyyneleet"	Haloo Helsinki!		Week 10	"Dinosauruksii"	Ellinoora	
Week 11	"Piilotan mun kyyneleet"	Haloo Helsinki!		Week 11	"Dinosauruksii"	Ellinoora	
Week 12	"Piilotan mun kyyneleet"	Haloo Helsinki!		Week 12	"Dinosauruksii"	Ellinoora	
Week 13	"Steppasin Partyy"	Yb026		Week 13	"Piilotan mun kyyneleet"	Haloo Helsinki!	
Week 14	"Montero (Call Me by Your Name)"	Lil Nas X		Week 14	"Piilotan mun kyyneleet"	Haloo Helsinki!	
Week 15	"Montero (Call Me by Your Name)"	Lil Nas X		Week 15	"Dinosauruksii"	Ellinoora	
Week 16	"Montero (Call Me by Your Name)"	Lil Nas X		Week 16	"Piilotan mun kyyneleet"	Haloo Helsinki!	
Week 17	"Montero (Call Me by Your Name)"	Lil Nas X		Week 17	"Piilotan mun kyyneleet"	Haloo Helsinki!	
Week 18	"Montero (Call Me by Your Name)"	Lil Nas X		Week 18	"Piilotan mun kyyneleet"	Haloo Helsinki!	
Week 19	"Pettäjä"	Sanni		Week 19	"Piilotan mun kyyneleet"	Haloo Helsinki!	
Week 20	"Montero (Call Me by Your Name)"	Lil Nas X		Week 20	"Piilotan mun kyyneleet"	Haloo Helsinki!	
Week 21	"Dark Side"	Blind Channel		Week 21	"Piilotan mun kyyneleet"	Haloo Helsinki!	
Week 22	"Zitti e buoni"	Måneskin		Week 22	"Piilotan mun kyyneleet"	Haloo Helsinki!	
Week 23	"Zitti e buoni"	Måneskin		Week 23	"Piilotan mun kyyneleet"	Haloo Helsinki!	
Week 24	"I Wanna Be Your Slave"	Måneskin		Week 24	"Piilotan mun kyyneleet"	Haloo Helsinki!	
Week 25	"I Wanna Be Your Slave"	Måneskin		Week 25	"Aavikko"	Lauri Tähkä	
Week 26	"Vauhti kiihtyy"	Portion Boys (featuring Matti ja Teppo)		Week 26	"Aavikko"	Lauri Tähkä	
Week 27	"I Wanna Be Your Slave"	Måneskin		Week 27	"Aavikko"	Lauri Tähkä	
Week 28	"Vauhti kiihtyy"	Portion Boys (featuring Matti ja Teppo)		Week 28	"Aavikko"	Lauri Tähkä	
Week 29	"Bad Habits"	Ed Sheeran		Week 29	"Taipumaton"	Kaija Koo	
Week 30	"Bad Habits"	Ed Sheeran		Week 30	"Taipumaton"	Kaija Koo	
Week 31	"Stay"	The Kid Laroi and Justin Bieber		Week 31	"Lupaan"	Behm	
Week 32	"Stay"	The Kid Laroi and Justin Bieber		Week 32	"Bad Habits"	Ed Sheeran	
Week 33	"Stay"	The Kid Laroi and Justin Bieber		Week 33	"Bad Habits"	Ed Sheeran	
Week 34	"Stay"	The Kid Laroi and Justin Bieber		Week 34	"Bad Habits"	Ed Sheeran	
Week 35	"Stay"	The Kid Laroi and Justin Bieber		Week 35	"Bad Habits"	Ed Sheeran	
Week 36	"Stay"	The Kid Laroi and Justin Bieber		Week 36	"Bad Habits"	Ed Sheeran	
Week 37	"Samma gamla vanliga" (remix)	Cledos, Ibe and Averagekidluke (featuring A36)		Week 37	"Bad Habits"	Ed Sheeran	
Week 38	"Samma gamla vanliga" (remix)	Cledos, Ibe and Averagekidluke (featuring A36)		Week 38	"Bad Habits"	Ed Sheeran	
Week 39	"Samma gamla vanliga" (remix)	Cledos, Ibe and Averagekidluke (featuring A36)		Week 39	"Bad Habits"	Ed Sheeran	
Week 40	"Samma gamla vanliga" (remix)	Cledos, Ibe and Averagekidluke (featuring A36)		Week 40	"Bad Habits"	Ed Sheeran	
Week 41	"Samma gamla vanliga" (remix)	Cledos, Ibe and Averagekidluke (featuring A36)		Week 41	"Tulikärpäset"	Haloo Helsinki!	
Week 42	"Samma gamla vanliga" (remix)	Cledos, Ibe and Averagekidluke (featuring A36)		Week 42	"Tulikärpäset"	Haloo Helsinki!	
Week 43	"Samma gamla vanliga" (remix)	Cledos, Ibe and Averagekidluke (featuring A36)		Week 43	"Tulikärpäset"	Haloo Helsinki!	
Week 44	"Samma gamla vanliga" (remix)	Cledos, Ibe and Averagekidluke (featuring A36)		Week 44	"Tulikärpäset"	Haloo Helsinki!	
Week 45	"Samma gamla vanliga" (remix)	Cledos, Ibe and Averagekidluke (featuring A36)		Week 45	"Tulikärpäset"	Haloo Helsinki!	
Week 46	"Samma gamla vanliga" (remix)	Cledos, Ibe and Averagekidluke (featuring A36)		Week 46	"Tulikärpäset"	Haloo Helsinki!	
Week 47	"Samma gamla vanliga" (remix)	Cledos, Ibe and Averagekidluke (featuring A36)		Week 47	"Easy on Me"	Adele	
Week 48	"Samma gamla vanliga" (remix)	Cledos, Ibe and Averagekidluke (featuring A36)		Week 48	"Easy on Me"	Adele	
Week 49	"Samma gamla vanliga" (remix)	Cledos, Ibe and Averagekidluke (featuring A36)		Week 49	"Easy on Me"	Adele	
Week 50	"ABCDEFU"	Gayle		Week 50	"Easy on Me"	Adele	
Week 51	"Snowman"	Sia		Week 51	"Merry Christmas"	Ed Sheeran and Elton John	
Week 52	"Joulun kanssas jaan"	Haloo Helsinki! (featuring Cantores Minores)		Week 52	"Easy on Me"	Adele	

== See also ==
- List of number-one albums of 2021 (Finland)
