= List of number-one albums of 2021 (Finland) =

This is the complete list of number-one albums in Finland in 2021 according to the Official Finnish Charts compiled by Musiikkituottajat. The chart is based on sales of physical and digital albums as well as music streaming.

== Chart history ==
Number-one albums of 2021 in Finland
Physical and digital albums
Week	Album	Artist(s)	Reference(s)
Week 1	Draaman kaari viehättää	Behm	
Week 2	Draaman kaari viehättää	Behm	
Week 3	Draaman kaari viehättää	Behm	
Week 4	Draaman kaari viehättää	Behm	
Week 5	Live in Stockholm 1977	Hurriganes	
Week 6	Draaman kaari viehättää	Behm	
Week 7	Zen	Gasellit	
Week 8	Master Workout	Antti Tuisku	
Week 9	Novus Ordo Mundi	Stam1na	
Week 10	Novus Ordo Mundi	Stam1na	
Week 11	Draaman kaari viehättää	Behm	
Week 12	Justice	Justin Bieber	
Week 13	Draaman kaari viehättää	Behm	
Week 14	Draaman kaari viehättää	Behm	
Week 15	Draaman kaari viehättää	Behm	
Week 16	Draaman kaari viehättää	Behm	
Week 17	Taipumaton	Kaija Koo	
Week 18	Taipumaton	Kaija Koo	
Week 19	Taipumaton	Kaija Koo	
Week 20	Jumalattomat	Kotiteollisuus	
Week 21	Hiljainen pöytä läheltä orkesteria	Klamydia	
Week 22	Teatro d'ira: Vol. I	Måneskin	
Week 23	Teatro d'ira: Vol. I	Måneskin	
Week 24	Teatro d'ira: Vol. I	Måneskin	
Week 25	Teatro d'ira: Vol. I	Måneskin	
Week 26	Teatro d'ira: Vol. I	Måneskin	
Week 27	Teatro d'ira: Vol. I	Måneskin	
Week 28	Teatro d'ira: Vol. I	Måneskin	
Week 29	Teatro d'ira: Vol. I	Måneskin	
Week 30	Teatro d'ira: Vol. I	Måneskin	
Week 31	Happier Than Ever	Billie Eilish	
Week 32	Once	Nightwish	
Week 33	Teatro d'ira: Vol. I	Måneskin	
Week 34	Erika Vikman	Erika Vikman	
Week 35	Donda	Kanye West	
Week 36	Senjutsu	Iron Maiden	
Week 37	Älä pelkää elämää	Haloo Helsinki!	
Week 38	Älä pelkää elämää	Haloo Helsinki!	
Week 39	Viimeinen romantikko	Ellinoora	
Week 40	Boy Wonder	William	
Week 41	Älä pelkää elämää	Haloo Helsinki!	
Week 42	Älä pelkää elämää	Haloo Helsinki!	
Week 43	A View from the Top of the World	Dream Theater	
Week 44	Dark Connection	Beast in Black	
Week 45	Voyage	ABBA	
Week 46	Voyage	ABBA	
Week 47	30	Adele	
Week 48	30	Adele	
Week 49	30	Adele	
Week 50	30	Adele	
Week 51	Tämä maailma tarvitsee joulun	Suvi Teräsniska	
Week 52	Tämä maailma tarvitsee joulun	Suvi Teräsniska	

== See also ==
- List of number-one singles of 2021 (Finland)
