= Erika Vikman (album) =

2021 studio album by Erika Vikman

Studio album by Erika Vikman
- Released: 20 August 2021
- Recorded: 2018–2021
- Genre: Pop; disco
- Length: 32:23
- Language: Finnish
- Label: Warner Music Finland; Mökkitie
- Producer: Mika Laakkonen; Timo Ruokola

Singles from Erika Vikman
- 1. "Cicciolina" Released: 27 January 2020; 2. "Syntisten pöytä" Released: 21 August 2020; 3. "Häpeä" Released: 9 April 2021; 4. "Tääl on niin kuuma" Released: 4 June 2021

Erika Vikman is the debut studio album by Finnish singer Erika Vikman. The album was released on 20 August 2021 through Warner Music Finland and Mökkitie Records, and peaked at number one on the Finnish albums chart. Production on the album was handled by Mika Laakkonen and Timo Ruokola.

The album was preceded by four singles: the lead single "Cicciolina" peaked at number five in Finland, becoming Vikman's first top ten hit in the country, while the follow-up singles "Syntisten pöytä" and "Tääl on niin kuuma" also peaked in the top ten. The album's third single "Häpeä" peaked within the top twenty.

== Background ==
Vikman began her professional music career in 2016, after winning Tangomarkkinat and signing a recording contract with Sony Music the following year. Vikman released three singles with Sony, but failed to receive much traction in the Finnish music industry. In 2018, Vikman was introduced to Finnish songwriter Janne Rintala, whom had worked extensively with Finnish singer-songwriter Arttu Wiskari, and informed him that she would like to collaborate. Vikman hoped to reinvent her image to that of an "inappropriate or unruly woman" and the "queen of trashy disco." Her recording contract with Sony later came to an end, and Vikman signed with Warner Music Finland and Mökkitie Records.

During the recording of the album in fall 2018, Vikman was featured in the series Unelmia ja studiohommia broadcast by Yle, while she was recording the song "Pizza" at the studios of Mökkitie Records.

== Singles ==
"Cicciolina" was released as the album's lead single on 27 January 2020. The song was selected to compete in Uuden Musiikin Kilpailu 2020, the Finnish national selection for the Eurovision Song Contest, with the winner of the 2020 edition receiving the right to represent Finland at the Eurovision Song Contest 2020 in Rotterdam. The final of the competition was held on 7 March 2020 at Mediapolis in Tampere. "Cicciolina" received the most votes from the Finnish public, receiving 99 points, but placed third with the professional music juries, receiving 58 points; this led to a total of 157 points, placing the song second behind Kankaanranta and "Looking Back", which had scored 170 points. Despite only placing second, "Cicciolina" went on to become Vikman's breakout song in Finland, peaking at number five on The Official Finnish Charts, and being certified platinum.

"Syntisten pöytä" was released as the album's second single on 21 August 2020. The song became the most commercially successful single on the album, peaking at number three on the Finnish singles charts and number one on the Finnish radio airplay charts, additionally becoming certified platinum. "Syntisten pöytä" was also nominated for Song of the Year at the 2021 Emma-gaala. "Häpeä" was released as the album's third single on 9 April 2021, and peaked at number 15 on the Finnish singles chart.

"Tääl on niin kuuma", a duet with Finnish singer-songwriter Arttu Wiskari, was released as the album's fourth and final single on 4 June 2021. The song was also selected to serve as the official theme song for the 2021 Kesäkumi campaign. "Tääl on niin kuuma" went on to peak at number six on the Finnish singles chart, becoming Vikman's third top ten hit.

== Track listing ==
Erika Vikman track listing
No.	Title	Writer(s)	Producer(s)	Length
1.	"Intro"	Janne Rintala	Mika Laakkonen	1:13
2.	"Cicciolina"	Rintala; Laakkonen; Vikman; Saskia Vanhalakka	Laakkonen	2:58
3.	"Aikuisten rannekkeet"	Rintala; Vanhalakka	Laakkonen	3:14
4.	"Pyhä Erika"	Kaisa Korhonen; Rintala	Laakkonen	3:26
5.	"Ei rakkaus kulu käyttämällä"	Rintala; Saara Törmä	Laakkonen	3:39
6.	"Pizza"	Rintala	Laakkonen	3:10
7.	"Häpeä"	Korhonen; Rintala	Laakkonen	3:23
8.	"Tääl on niin kuuma" (with Arttu Wiskari)	Jonas Olsson; Aku Rannila; Rintala	Laakkonen	2:55
9.	"Amorin siivet"	Korhonen; Rintala	Timo Ruokola	3:40
10.	"Syntisten pöytä"	Korhonen; Rintala	Laakkonen	3:43
11.	"Outro"	Rintala	Laakkonen	1:02
Total length:				33:43

== Charts ==
Weekly chart performance for Erika Vikman
Chart (2021)	Peak position
Finnish Albums (Suomen virallinen lista)	1

== Release history ==
Release formats for Erika Vikman
Region	Date	Format	Distributor	Ref.
Various	21 August 2021	CD; digital download; streaming	Warner Music Finland; Mökkitie Records	
Various	26 November 2021	Vinyl	Warner Music Finland; Mökkitie Records	

== See also ==
- List of number-one albums of 2021 (Finland)
