= Diva Futura =

Italian pornography and erotica film studio

- Industry: Pornography
- Founded: 1983
- Founder: Ilona Staller & Riccardo Schicchi
- Defunct: 2021
- Headquarters: Italy
- Products: Pornographic films
- Website: www.divafutura.tv

Diva Futura (Italian for "Future Diva", i.e. "Future Star") is an Italian pornography and erotica film studio. When founded in 1983 by porn star Ilona Staller and photographer and talent scout Riccardo Schicchi, it was the first casting agency in Italy to specialize in pornography. The studio is notable for launching the careers of pornstars Cicciolina and Moana Pozzi.

== Development ==
In 1985, Diva Futura produced the first Italian hardcore porn film, Telefono Rosso, starring Staller (a.k.a. Cicciolina). The following year, in February 1986, the company produced Curve deliziose, a spettacolo (live theatrical show) featuring several porn stars.

== Controversy ==
Diva Futura has caused some moral panic among certain Italian Catholic groups, and has had to defend itself against legal action for obscenity, most notably in 1986 when Curve deliziose was released. Ilona Staller (already a member of the Italian Parliament) formed the Partito dell'Amore in 1991, switching from the Partito Radicale (although this political activity was not officially linked to Diva Futura).

== Television ==
Recently, Diva Futura has founded satellite television channels in Italy on Hotbird. Its original channel (commonly known as Diva Futura TV) began in August 2004, and Diva Futura Plus began on 1 September 2006. Schicchi also announced that Diva Futura Sex, a new channel, would begin on 15 August 2007.
