= Ilona Staller =

Hungarian-Italian former pornographic actress, politician, and singer (born 1951)

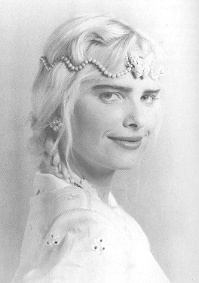
- Staller in 1987

Member of the Chamber of Deputies
- In office 2 July 1987 – 22 April 1992
- Constituency: Lazio

Personal details
- Born: Ilona Anna Staller; 26 November 1951 (age 74) Budapest, Hungarian People's Republic
- Party: Radical Party (1987–1989); Love Party (1991–1992)
- Height: 168 cm (5 ft 6 in)
- Spouses: Salvatore Martini (m. 1971; div. 1972) Jeff Koons (m. 1991; div. 1994)
- Children: Ludwig Koons (son)
- Occupation: Pornographic actress; politician; singer
- Other names: Cicciolina
- Website: cicciolinaonline.it (in Italian)

Ilona Anna Staller (born 26 November 1951), known by her stage name Cicciolina, is a Hungarian-Italian former porn star, politician, and singer. Staller gained fame in the early 1970s through her radio show Voulez-vous coucher avec moi? and became widely recognized by her stage name Cicciolina. She appeared in numerous films and gained attention for being the first to bare her breasts on live Italian television in 1978. Staller ventured into politics and was elected to the Italian Parliament in 1987, campaigning on a libertarian platform with the Radical Party.

Throughout her career, Staller made provocative offers, such as offering to have sex with Saddam Hussein, Osama bin Laden and Vladimir Putin in exchange for peace. Staller also had a brief marriage to American artist Jeff Koons, with whom she had a son.

== Early life ==
Staller was born in Budapest during the era of the Hungarian People's Republic. Her father, László Staller, left the family when she was 3. She was raised by her mother, who was a midwife, and her stepfather, who was an official in the Hungarian Ministry of the Interior. In 1964, at age 12, she began working as a model for the Hungarian news agency Magyar Távirati Iroda. In her memoirs and in a 1999 TV interview, she claimed that she had provided the Hungarian authorities with information on American diplomats staying at a Budapest luxury hotel where she worked as a maid in the 1960s.

During her hotel work when she was 20, Staller met a 25-year-old Italian national named Salvatore Mercuri, whom she later married. Initially, she had accepted the marriage proposal, but she changed her mind before the wedding and threw the ring on the snow. Staller's stepfather forced her to marry him to avoid embarrassment. During the ceremony, the priest reportedly noticed that Staller was the saddest bride he had ever met. The couple lived in Milan, near the Central Station, in modest conditions. Her work as a model allowed her to divorce after a year of marriage.

== Pornography and show business ==
Naturalized through marriage and settled in Italy, Staller met pornographer Riccardo Schicchi in the early 1970s. Starting in 1973, she gained fame with her radio show called Voulez-vous coucher avec moi? on Radio Luna. For that program, she adopted the name Cicciolina, and she referred to her male fanbase and later the male members of the Italian Parliament as cicciolini ("little tubby boys").

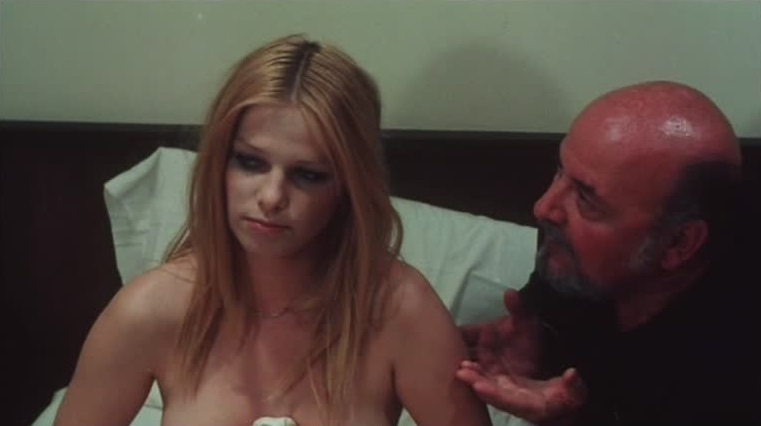
Staller in the 1975 film L'ingenua

Staller appeared in several films from 1970 but made her debut under her own name in 1975 with La liceale (also known as The Teasers), where she played alongside Gloria Guida as her lesbian classmate. In 1978, during the RAI show C'era due Volte, Staller's breasts were the first to be bared live on Italian TV. In 1983, she appeared in her first hardcore pornographic film, Telefono rosso (Red Telephone). Staller produced the film together with Schicchi's company, Diva Futura. Her memoirs were published as Confessioni erotiche di Cicciolina (Erotic Confessions of Cicciolina) by Olympia Press of Milan in 1987. That same year, she appeared in Carne bollente, titled The Rise and Fall of the Roman Empress in the United States, co-starring John Holmes. The film caused controversy when it was later revealed that Holmes had tested positive for HIV prior to appearing in it.

In 1987, invited by the Portuguese magazine Tal & Qual, Staller visited the Assembly of the Republic and posed topless, leading to the suspension of the session and official complaints from members of CDS – People's Party. The only person who talked to Staller was Natália Correia.

Staller has appeared nude in Playboy editions in several countries. Her first Playboy appearance was in Argentina in March 1988. She also appeared in the U.S. edition in September 1990, and in Hungary (June 2005), Serbia (July 2005), and Mexico (September 2005).

In the early-'90s, Staller appeared in several porn scenes of Italian hardcore films with Rocco Siffredi, when he was a young rising porn star. They worked together in movies like "Le perversioni degli angeli" in 1991.

In 1994, Staller appeared in the sci-fi film Replikator. In 1996, she had a role in the Brazilian soap opera Xica da Silva as Princess Ludovica di Castelgandolfo di Genova. In 2008, Staller participated as a contestant on the Argentine version of Strictly Come Dancing called Bailando por un Sueño. In 2026, she was chosen by Andreas Kronthaler to appear in Juergen Teller's campaign for Vivienne Westwood Autumn/Winter 2026–27 collection; Kronthaler referred to her as "an icon that brings everyone together".

== Political life ==
In 1979, Staller was presented as a female candidate to the Italian Parliament by the Lista del Sole, Italy's first Green party. In 1985, she switched to the Radical Party, campaigning on a libertarian platform against nuclear energy and NATO membership, as well as for human rights. She was elected to the Italian Parliament in 1987, with approximately 20,000 votes. While in office and before the outset of the Gulf War, she offered to have sex with Iraqi leader Saddam Hussein in return for peace in the region. She was not re-elected at the end of her term in 1992.

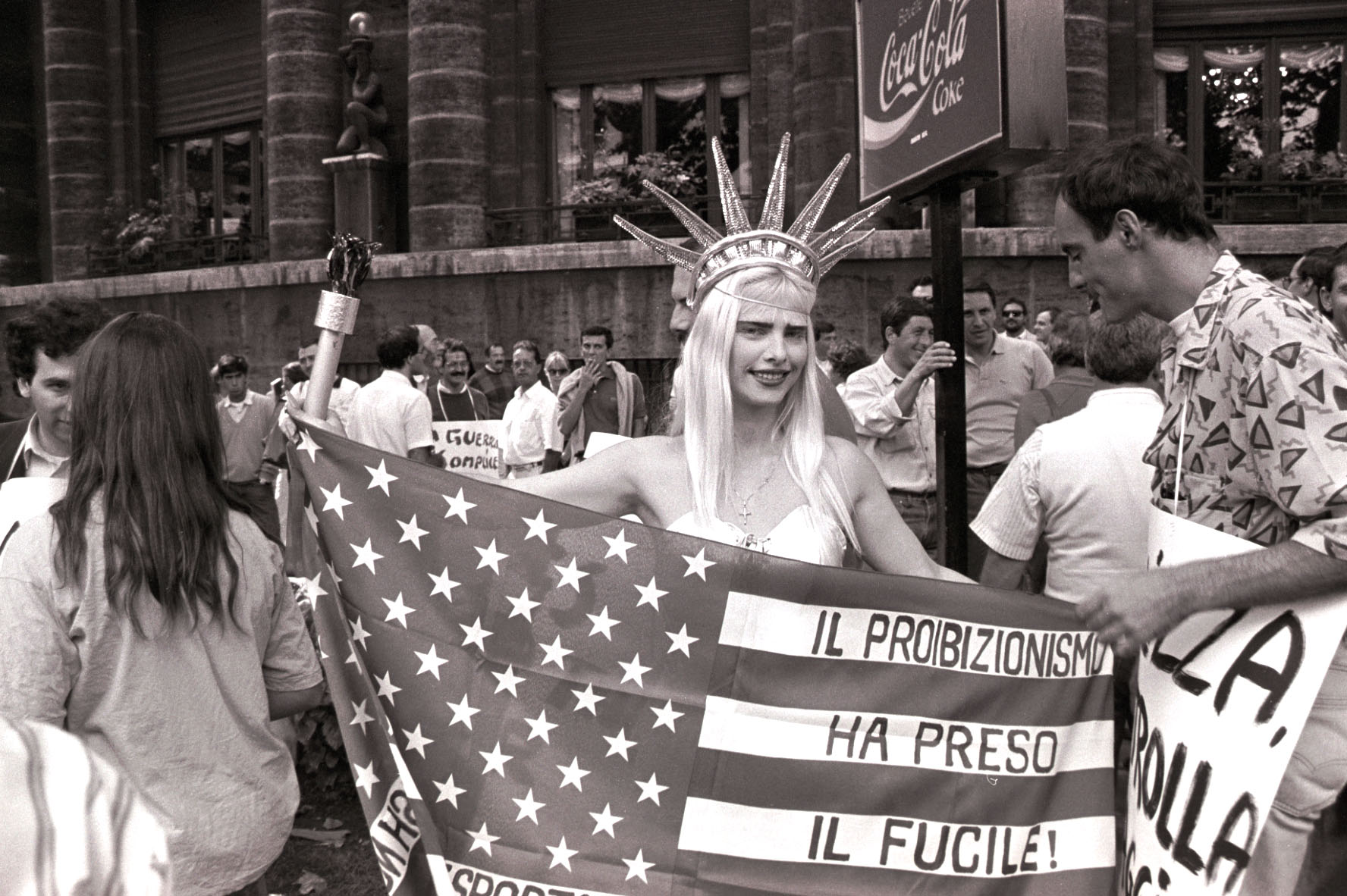
Staller at a protest in Rome, 1989

In 1991, Staller was among the founders of another Italian political movement, called Love Party, which was spearheaded by friend and fellow porn star Moana Pozzi. In January 2002, she began exploring the possibility of campaigning in Hungary, her country of birth, to represent Budapest's industrial Kőbánya district in the Hungarian Parliament; however, she failed to collect enough petition signatures for a non-partisan candidacy. In the same year, she ran in the local elections in Monza, Lombardy, promising to convert a prominent building into a gambling casino but was not elected. In 2004, she announced plans to run for mayor of Milan with a similar promise. She renewed her offer to have sex with Saddam Hussein in October 2002, when Iraq was resisting international pressure to allow inspections for weapons of mass destruction, and she made the same offer to Osama bin Laden in April 2006.

In September 2011, it was revealed that Staller was eligible for and would be receiving a yearly pension of €39,000 from the Italian state as a result of her five years in the country's parliament. Reacting to the controversy raised by the news, Staller, who started receiving the pension in November 2011, when she turned 60, stated: "I earned it and I'm proud of it." In 2012, Staller founded the Democracy, Nature, Love party. Its objectives included the legalization of same-sex marriage, the reopening of former brothels, a guaranteed minimum wage for young people, improvements to the judiciary, and the elimination of the privileges of the rich political caste. On a proposal by blogger Luca Bagatin, who said that Staller was "a friend I had always respected and was intrigued by the idea of relaunching the secular area with a 'radical' and 'far-left' program", Staller was the unsuccessful candidate, in the 2013 Rome municipal election in Rome held on 26 and 27 May 2013, as part of the Republicans and Liberals list.

In 2020, Staller relaunched her Democracy, Nature, Love party and said that she had appealed a new law that reduced her parliamentary pension from €3,100 to €1,000.

== Musical career ==
Staller has recorded several songs, mostly from live performances, with explicit lyrics being sung to a children's melody. Her most famous song is "Muscolo rosso", a song entirely dedicated to il cazzo, which means "the dick" in Italian. Because of its extensive use of profanity, the song could not be released in Italy, but became a hit in other countries, especially in France. The song gained considerable popularity in the internet era, when many Italian speakers were able to hear it for the first time. Several unreleased songs were recorded during her RCA period and the Diva Futura agency period. Some of these unreleased songs were subsequently used during her TV shows and live performances or as soundtracks in her porn movies.

== Personal life ==
Staller was the muse of American artist Jeff Koons, who persuaded her to collaborate on a series of sculptures and photographs of them having sex in many positions, settings, and costumes, which were exhibited under the title Made in Heaven and made waves at the 1990 Venice Biennale. Staller married Koons in 1991. In 1992, they had a son but separated the following year, partly because Staller refused to stop making porn. Their marriage ended in 1994. In violation of a United States court order, as Koons had custody of their child, Staller left the United States for Italy, taking their then-two-year-old son. In 2008, Staller filed suit against Koons for failing to pay child support. In 2024, Staller said that she has reported her son to the police for drug abuse several times.

Staller is an accomplished chess player, having learned from her father while growing up in Hungary. In July 2021, it was announced she would demonstrate her ability in an exhibition match, taking on four top players simultaneously.

== In popular culture ==
In 1980, an erotic comics series, La Cicciolina, was made by Lucio Filippucci and Giovanni Romanini, based on Staller. Italian metal band Bulldozer released the tracks "Ilona the Very Best" on their 1987 album IX and "Ilona Had Been Elected" on their 1988 album Neurodeliri in dedication to her. In 1994, Later in 2005, Japanese metal band Abigail released the compilation "Abigail Loves Ilona, as She Is the Very Best" featuring a photograph of Ilona as the album art, and includes several Bulldozer covers.

Brazilian musician Fausto Fawcett wrote a song in tribute to Cicciolina, titled "Cicciolina (O Cio Eterno)", featured on his 1989 album Império dos Sentidos. British band Pop Will Eat Itself released a song called "Touched by the Hand of Cicciolina" as an unofficial World Cup single in July 1990. The song reached number 28 on the UK Singles Chart. The 1991 Machines of Loving Grace album paid tribute to Staller and named a song after her. Chilean punk band Los Peores de Chile released a song titled "Chicholina" in 1994, which had heavy TV and radio airplay, receiving critical acclaim by the national music press at the time, in live shows, the band says Ilona is a God.

Finnish singer Erika Vikman released a song titled "Cicciolina" on 26 January 2020. It was selected as one of six entries that competed to represent Finland in the Eurovision Song Contest 2020. The song finished in second place in the national selection. In the 2020 Spanish television series Veneno, Staller, played by Miriam Giovanelli, was portrayed attending to a party in Gran Canaria in 1996, where she met Spanish personality La Veneno. Also in 2020, electronic music duo Brutalismus 3000 released a song titled "Cicciolina", the first track of their album named Amore Hardcore. In the song, they refer to Staller and her life. In 2023, Oska Wald from the band Chuckamuck released a song entitled "Pizza Amore", in which he refers to a fictional pizza called "Pizza Cicciolina".

Ilona Staller was portrayed by Lidija Kordic in the 2024 Italian film Diva Futura.

=== Discography ===
==== LPs/CDs ====
- 1979 Ilona Staller (RCA PL 31442) published at least in Italy and Colombia. The Colombian record has titles in Spanish. A music tape also exists.
  - Track list: I Was Made for Dancin' / Pane Marmellata e Me / Labbra / Benihana / Lascia l'ultimo ballo per me / Cavallina Cavallo (by Ennio Morricone) / It's all up to you / Professor of Percussions / Più su sempre più su
- 1987 Muscolo Rosso (Boy Records) published in Spain only.
  - Track list: Russians / Inno (Come un angelo) / Satisfaction / Telefono rosso (Avec toi) / Black Sado / Goccioline (Bambole) / Perversion / Animal Rock / Nirvana / Muscolo rosso / Muscolo rosso (reprise)
- 1988 Sonhos Eróticos printed in Brazil only. (All Disc 00.101.009, also music tape 00.107.009.) Reprint of the English long playing Erotic dreams plus two Cicciolina songs "Muscolo rosso" and "Avec toi". The other songs are performed by Erotic Dreams Band. Some of Cicciolina's speeches are used in "La prima volta" song. Cover is dedicated to Cicciolina.
  - Track list: Muscolo rosso / Emmanuelle / Bilitis / Le réve / La prima volta / I feel love / Je t'aime... moi non plus / Histoire d'O / Les Femmes / Black Emmanuelle / Love to love you bay / Avec toi
- 1994 Sonhos Eróticos (Brazil only, All Disc RQ 032) Reprint of 1988 LP with a new layout of the cover, with background from brown to pink and violet.
- 2000 Ilona Staller (CD, in United Kingdom only, Sequel Records/Caste Music NEMCD398); reprint on CD of the 1979 LP, plus the two extended tracks of the red vinyl mix.
- 2000 Ilona Staller (LP, in United Kingdom only, Sequel Record/Castle Music NEMLP398); white label promotional test pressings, less than 5, were made for a proposed but ultimately cancelled vinyl release of the CD reissue.

==== 7" disks ====
- 1976 "Voulez vous coucher avec moi?" (Italy only, with neither serial number nor cover; on the vinyl it is written "Nuovo Playore 1° Radio Rete 4 D.R." only); from the same-named radio programme on Radio Luna station by Riccardo Schicchi where the nickname Cicciolina was born.
- 1979 "I Was Made for Dancin'" / "Più su sempre su su" (Italy only, RCA PB 6323)
- 1979 "Cavallina Cavallo" / "Più su sempre più su" (Japan only, RCA SS 3205)
- 1980 "Buone Vacanze" / "Ti amo uomo" (Italy only, RCA BB 6449)
- 1981 "Ska Skatenati" / "Disco Smack" (Italy only, LUPUS LUN 4917)
- 1987 "Muscolo rosso" / "Avec toi" (SFC 17117–7) symbol of the Italian Radical Party on the cover. The record was published in France and limited in other European countries.
- 1987 "Muscolo rosso" / "Russians" (Spain only, BOY-028-PRO) promo for journalist; no cover.

==== 12" mix and picture disks ====
- 1979 "I Was Made for Dancin'" (extended version) / "Save the Last Dance for Me" (English original version of "Lascia l'ultimo ballo per me") (Italy only, RCA PD 6327, red vinyl mix without cover, promo for DJs).
- 1987 "Muscolo Rosso" / "Russians" (Spain only, BOY-028) versions are not extended, the same as 7".
- 1989 "San Francisco Dance" / "Living in my Paradise" / "My Sexy Shop" (Acv 5472) Picture disk; limited edition; published in Europe, together with her colleague Moana Pozzi's release.

==== Collaborations ====
- 1979 Dedicato al Mar Egeo, LP soundtrack by Ennio Morricone published in Japan only; though she does not sing, she is portrayed naked on the inlay and back-cover. She recorded two songs from that album ("Cavallina a cavallo" and "Mar Egeo") later in the year. The LP exists in two versions, one with Japanese titles, the other with Italian titles. Also, a CD version exists.
- 1979 Aquarium sounds, LP of an Italian TV programme; she sings on the track "Elena Tip".

== Bibliography ==
- Barbano, Nicolas (1999). Verdens 25 hotteste pornostjerner. Denmark: Rosinante. ISBN 87-7357-961-0. Features a chapter on Cicciolina (in Danish).
- Filippucci, Lucio; Romanini, Giovanni (1989). Les aventures de Cicciolina. FRance: Média 1000. Graphic novel about her life (in French).
- Schicchi, Riccardo; Staller, Ilona (1992). Cicciolina. Cologne: Taschen. ISBN 3-8228-9761-2. Large-format Italian, German, English, and French language album.
