= Bulldozer (band) =

Italian metal band

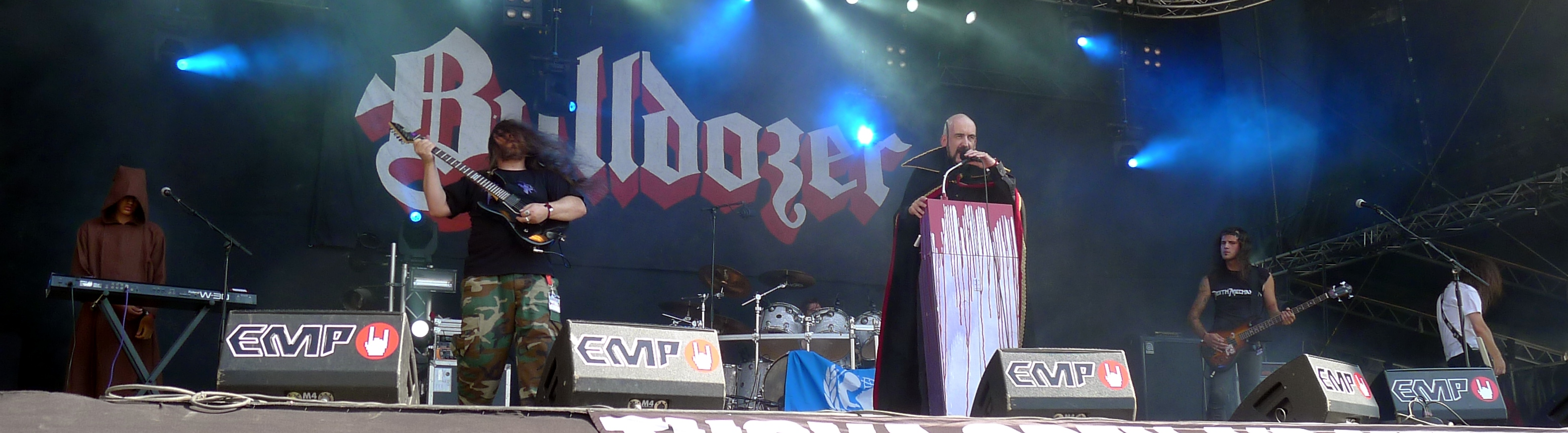
- Bulldozer at Tuska Open Air 2011

Background information
- Origin: Milan, Italy
- Genres: Speed metal; thrash metal; black metal
- Years active: 1980–1990, 2008–present
- Members: A.C. Wild; Andy Panigada; Manu
- Past members: Dario Carria; Erminio Galli; Rob K. Cabrini; Don Andras

Bulldozer is an Italian extreme metal band from Milan active from 1980 to 1990 and reformed in 2008.

== History ==
Bulldozer formed in 1980 by bassist Dario Carria and guitarist Andy Panigada. Erminio Galli joined them on drums. They split up in 1981 due to national service commitments, but reformed in 1983 with Alberto Contini (A.C. Wild) on bass and vocals, and drummer Don Andras. This lineup recorded the Fallen Angel demo (later re-issued as a 7"), their debut, The Day of Wrath, and their follow-up, The Final Separation.

The Day of Wrath was produced by Algy Ward of Tank, a bass-driven power trio that influenced Bulldozer. The Final Separation interrupted the deal with Roadrunner Records, which failed to promote the album and selected a different image from the one the band suggested as its cover art. The band deemed the photo cartoonish and ineffective. They signed a new contract with Italian label Metalmagic, a sub-division of Discomagic.

Drummer Rob Cabrini was brought in for IX (1987). This lineup recorded Neurodeliri (1988), and was captured live in Poland in 1990 for Alive... in Poland. Their final release was the posthumous Dance Got Sick! EP, which, although put together by Contini as a "joke", enjoyed success in Japan, prompting him to move to that country to work in music production.

In 2004, Bulldozer's song "Whiskey Time" was included in the Peaceville Records compilation Fenriz Presents... The Best of Old-School Black Metal, assembled by Darkthrone's drummer Fenriz. In November 2006, Bulldozer's five albums were collected by Polish label Metal Mind Productions on the box set Regenerated in the Grave. The box set, with bonus tracks and a 32-page booklet, was limited to 2,000 copies.

In 2007, Italian power metallers Labyrinth, while touring Japan, hosted Contini onstage for a rendition of Bulldozer's classics. The crowd's appreciation of the songs sparked thoughts of reunion. As of 2008, according to statements from Alberto Contini and Andy Panigada, Bulldozer had reunited. Contini announced that they would start to work on a new album in August 2008. The album, Unexpected Fate, was released on 11 June 2009, and features Death Mechanism drummer Manu as Bulldozer's third member.

The band was scheduled to perform at the Hell's Heroes music festival in Houston in March 2026.

== Musical style ==
Bulldozer plays thrash/speed metal in the style of Motörhead, Venom, and Tank, initially combined with satanic and occult themes. However, A.C. Wild is not a Satanist, and has stated that his lyrics were merely based on personal experiences. Starting with their second album, keyboards were introduced into Bulldozer's music, primarily to create a dark atmosphere. On the album IX, the band's original themes were replaced with pornographic lyrics. At that time, the porn industry in Italy was at its peak, led by adult film actress Ilona Staller, whom Bulldozer wrote a song about. Later releases featured the typical party themes and social criticism of that era. On Neurodeliri, the band experimented with samples, symphonic elements, and triggered drums after being dropped by Roadrunner Records and losing hope of achieving further success. The commercial press ignored or mocked the band, with magazines like Kerrang! and Metal Hammer giving them zero-star reviews, something A.C. Wild has said he is proud of. The band's earnings only covered the production costs.

IX caused controversy due to its lyrics, but according to A.C. Wild, they were filled with irony that only a few understood. The band did not provoke just for fun but rather to make people think. In the underground scene, Bulldozer was praised for never softening their sound like other thrash metal bands and always maintaining a raw style with a morbid atmosphere. Their uncompromising approach later influenced the second wave of black metal; some elements of Graveland's music, for example, resemble the title track from Neurodeliri.

On the 1992 EP Dance Got Sick, produced by a rapper, the band played a mix of metal, rap, and techno, which, according to A.C. Wild, influenced the Japanese techno scene for two years.

In 2000, a Bulldozer tribute album titled The Bulldozer Armageddon – Volume 1 featured covers by Sabbat (Japan) and Imperial (France), followed by a second volume in 2001 with Abigail (Japan) and Decayed (Portugal). Fenriz of Darkthrone included Bulldozer's song "Whiskey Time" on his 2004 compilation Fenriz Presents... The Best of Old-School Black Metal.

== Band members ==
=== Current lineup ===
- Alberto "A.C. Wild" Contini – vocals (1983–1990, 2008–present), bass (1984–1990, studio 2008–2011)
- Andy Panigada – guitars (1980–1981, 1983–1990, 2008–present)
- Emanuele "Manu" Collato – drums (2008–present)
- Ghiulz Borroni – guitars (2009–present)
- Giovanni "G.C." Contini – keyboard (2009–present)
- Alessandro Pozza – bass (2011–present)

=== Former members ===
- Don Andras – drums (1984–1987)
- Dario Carria – vocals (1980–1981), bass (1980–1981, 1983–1984) (died 1988)
- Erminio Galli – drums (1980–1981, 1983–1984)
- Rob K. Cabrini – drums (1987–1990)

== Discography ==
=== Main albums ===
- The Day of Wrath (1985, Roadrunner Records)
- The Final Separation (1986, Roadrunner)
- IX (1987, Discomagic Records)
- Neurodeliri (1988, Metal Master Records)
- Alive... in Poland (live, 1990, Metal Master)
- Unexpected Fate (2009, Scarlet Records)
- The Neurospirit Lives... (2012, Scarlet)
- The Exorcism (2014, Foad Records, re-recording of the 1984 original demo)

=== EPs ===
- Dance Got Sick! (EP, 1992, Build Records)

=== Compilations ===
- 1983–1990: The Years of Wrath (1999, Sound Cave Records)
- Regenerated in the Grave (box set, 2006, Metal Mind Productions)
