= The Final Separation =

Studio album by Bulldozer
- Released: February 1986
- Recorded: Bips Studio, Milan, Italy
- Genre: Thrash metal; black metal
- Label: Roadrunner
- Producer: Bulldozer

Bulldozer chronology
The Day of Wrath (1985)	The Final Separation (1986)	IX (1987)

Professional ratings
Review scores
Source	Rating
Allmusic	4/5 stars

The Final Separation is the second album by the Italian thrash/black metal band Bulldozer, released in February 1986.

== Track listing ==
All songs by A.C. Wild & Andy Panigada

Side A
No.	Title	Length
1.	"The Final Separation"	4:50
2.	"Ride Hard - Die Fast"	3:59
3.	"The Cave"	4:34
4.	"Sex Symbols' Bullshit"	3:31
5.	"'Don' Andras"	3:04

Side B
No.	Title	Length
6.	"Never Relax!"	5:35
7.	"Don't Trust the 'Saint'"	4:28
8.	"The Death of Gods"	10:05
Total length:		40:06

Limited Edition Bonus Track
No.	Title	Length
1.	"Another Beer (It's What I Need)"	3:15
Total length:		43:21

== Band members ==
- A.C. Wild - vocals and bass
- Andy Panigada - guitar
- Don Andras - drums, vocals on "Don" Andras

== Production ==
- Ivan Facchin - engineering
- Nicola Calgari - engineering
- Tony Magrini - photography
