= IX (Bulldozer album) =

Studio album by Bulldozer
- Released: December 1987
- Recorded: Bips Studio, Milan, Italy
- Genre: Thrash metal, black metal
- Length: 31:02
- Label: Discomagic
- Producer: Bulldozer

Bulldozer chronology
| The Final Separation (1986) | IX (1987) | Neurodeliri (1988) |

Professional ratings
Review scores
| Source | Rating |
|---|---|
| Sea of Tranquility | 3.5/5 stars |

IX is the third album by the Italian thrash/black metal metal band Bulldozer, released in December 1987. A 12" vinyl by Japanese record label F.O.A.D. Records was released on 9 May 2014 containing an extra slimcase CD included in the gatefold, filled with rare and unreleased photos. This is a sort of a "director's cut" proposed by the band that was previously unreleased.

== Track listing ==
All lyrics written by A.C. Wild. All tracks written by ix.

Side A
| No. | Title | Length |
|---|---|---|
| 1. | "IX" | 3:37 |
| 2. | "Desert!" | 4:30 |
| 3. | "Ilona the Very Best" | 2:41 |
| 4. | "Misogynists" | 3:37 |

Side B
| No. | Title | Length |
|---|---|---|
| 5. | "Heaven's Jail" | 2:48 |
| 6. | "Rob "Klister" | 2:00 |
| 7. | "The Derby" | 4:02 |
| 8. | "No-Way" | 2:59 |
| 9. | "The Vision Never Fades" | 4:48 |
| Total length: | | 31:02 |

2007 limited edition bonus track
| No. | Title | Length |
|---|---|---|
| 1. | "The Derby" (live in Tokyo, Japan) | 5:05 |
| Total length: | | 36:07 |

2014 director's cut mix
| No. | Title | Length |
|---|---|---|
| 1. | "IX" | 3:36 |
| 2. | "Desert!" | 4:18 |
| 3. | "Ilona the Very Best" | 2:41 |
| 4. | "Misogynists" | 3:40 |
| Total length: | | 14:15 |

== Notes ==
- "Ilona the Very Best" is dedicated to Ilona Staller, a famous porn star of the 1980s.
- "The Derby" is dedicated to the soccer club AC Milan, which A.C. Wild is a big fan of.

== Personnel ==
Bulldozer

- Andy Panigada – guitars
- A.C. Wild – vocals, bass, keyboards
- Rob "Klister" Cabrini – drums

Production

- Nick – engineering
- Marco Comerio – cover art
- Rob "Klister" Cabrini – cover art
- Joseph Carlucci – photography
- Ivan – engineering
- Luca Passeri – cover art
