= The Day of Wrath =

Studio album by Bulldozer
- Released: 13 March 1985
- Recorded: Psycho Studios, Milan, Italy
- Genre: Thrash metal; black metal
- Label: Roadrunner
- Producer: Algy Ward

Bulldozer chronology
| The Day of Wrath (1985) | The Final Separation (1986) |

Professional ratings
Review scores
| Source | Rating |
|---|---|
| AllMusic | 4.5/5 stars |

The Day of Wrath is the major-label debut album of the Italian thrash/black metal band Bulldozer, released on 13 March 1985.

== Music and lyrics ==
Adem Tepedelen of Decibel categorized the style on The Day of Wrath as "a prime slice of Motörhead- and Venom-inspired first-wave black metal." Eduardo Rivadavia of AllMusic described the sound on the album as "literally the sound of all hell breaking loose." He described the drumming of Don Andras as sounding "locomotive-like". Lyrical themes explored on the album include Satanism and rituals.

== Reception and legacy ==
Eduardo Rivadavia of AllMusic gave the album four and a half stars out of five. He stated the album helped bridge the gap between the early days of black metal with the scene that would later develop in Scandinavia, alongside releases by Hellhammer and Bathory: "The Day of Wrath wasn't pretty, nor very original, but then ugly was what black metal was about in the mid-'80s -- as well as a D.I.Y.-like simplicity, sheer volume, blind fury, shock value, and of course Beelzebub. What Bulldozer deserve credit for [...] is helping to bridge the trying years between black metal's messy, underrated beginnings and the next generation of mostly Scandinavian bands that would revive and reinvent it for the 1990s, duly transforming it into one of the most form-challenging and sophisticated musical styles in the world by the start of the 21st century."

The album was inducted into the Decibel Hall of Fame in 2024. Staff writer Adem Tepedelen said: "Though Bulldozer plowed forward after Wrath, subsequent releases quickly moved away from the primal, punky evil of the debut. Nothing in the band’s catalog shares the feral immediacy of Wrath, and by the early ’90s Contini left Bulldozer behind and immersed himself in producing Euro dance tracks with great success."

== Track listing ==
All songs written by Andy Panigada & AC Wild

Side A
| No. | Title | Length |
|---|---|---|
| 1. | "The Exorcism" (Instrumental) | 2:49 |
| 2. | "Cut-Throat" | 3:54 |
| 3. | "Insurrection of the Living Damned" | 5:43 |
| 4. | "Fallen Angel" | 3:56 |
| 5. | "The Great Deceiver" | 4:31 |

Side B
| No. | Title | Length |
|---|---|---|
| 6. | "Mad Man" | 4:41 |
| 7. | "Whisky TIme" | 4:15 |
| 8. | "Welcome Death" | 6:08 |
| 9. | "Endless Funeral" (Instrumental) | 5:41 |
| Total length: | | 41:38 |

Limited Edition Bonus Track
| No. | Title | Length |
|---|---|---|
| 1. | "Fallen Angel" (Demo; From "Fallen Angel" demo) | 3:45 |
| Total length: | | 45:23 |

== Personnel ==
- A.C. Wild – bass, vocals
- Andy Panigada – rhythm & lead guitars
- Don Andras – drums, percussion

Additional Musicians

- Adriano Bosone – narration on "The Exorcism"
- Dario Carria – bass on "Fallen Angel"

== Production ==
- Algy Ward – producer
- Claudio Dentes – engineering
