= Pornography in Asia =

Pornography in Asia includes pornography created in Asia, watched in Asia, or consumed or displayed in other parts of the world as one or more of the genres of Asian pornography.

== East Asia ==
=== China ===
Internet pornography was outlawed in the People's Republic of China effective 2002, when state censors issued guidelines requiring that all websites remove any pornographic material. The government started a crackdown in 2004, which included the jailing of a woman.

Since 2008, the production of pornographic films has been banned by state censors, the State Administration of Radio, Film, and Television's prohibition on pornography has been complete, and the government has shown no signs of changing course. Directors, producers, and actors involved in pornographic films have been barred from competing in any film competitions. Any film studio found in violation may have its license revoked. As a result of this regulation and censorship, adult films and media can only be obtained through the Internet and on the black market. Possession of pornography is punishable by up to 3 years in prison, a fine of CN¥ 20,000, or up to life imprisonment for large underground distributors. In 2010 China shut down 60,000 pornographic websites according to the news agency Reuters, arresting almost 5,000 suspects in the process.

China's criminal code defines pornography as

sex-propagating books or periodicals, films, video- or audio-tapes, pictures or other pornographic articles which concretely describe sexual acts or undisguisedly publicize sex

— translation by Asian Legal Information Institute

It is illegal to sell, distribute pornography or arrange for pornographic performances in mainland China.

=== Hong Kong ===
In Hong Kong, pornography is illegal if sold or shown to children under 18 years of age, if it is publicly displayed (except within the confines of and only visible from inside a "bona fide art gallery or museum"), or if it is sold without being wrapped completely with an "easily noticeable" warning stating that the material may be offensive and may not be distributed to minors.

=== Japan ===
Pornography in Japan includes pornography ranging from well-known sex acts such as bukkake to sexual fetish pornography such as tamakeri. Pornography is legal in Japan; however, there are restrictions. Genitalia must be pixelated or censored under Article 175 of the Penal Code of Japan (1907) and all participants must be 18 years of age or older, unless it is of a fictional characters.

As in Europe, photographs of nudes are not uncommon in the mainstream media. In the 1970s and 1980s, the strongest prohibition was against showing pubic hair or adult genitalia. Imported magazines would have the pubic hair scratched out, and even the most explicit videos could not portray it. Starting around 1991, photobook publishers began challenging this ban to the point where the portrayal of pubic hair is now fairly well accepted. Close-ups of genitalia remain proscribed. In 1999, the government enacted a law banning photos and videos of naked children. Manga and anime remain largely unregulated, although large publishers tend to self-censor or specify that characters are at least 18 years of age.

The 1960s, in Japanese pornography, was the era of the independent Pink film. In the years since the end of World War II, eroticism had been gradually making its way into Japanese cinema. The first kiss to be seen in Japanese film—discreetly half-hidden by an umbrella—caused a national sensation in 1946. Nevertheless, until the early 1960s, graphic depictions of nudity and sex in Japanese film could only be seen in single-reel "stag films", made illegally by underground film producers such as those depicted in Imamura's film The Pornographers (1966). Nudity and sex would officially enter the Japanese cinema with the independent, low-budget softcore pornographic films which would come to dominate domestically produced films in the 1960s and 1970s. These films were called eroductions during the early 1960s, but are now more commonly referred to as pink films. The first true pink film, and the first Japanese movie with nude scenes, was Satoru Kobayashi's controversial and popular independent production, Flesh Market (Nikutai no Ichiba, 1962), starring Tamaki Katori. Katori would go on to star in over 600 pink films throughout the 1960s, earning the nickname the "Pink Princess". In 1964 Tetsuji Takechi made the first big-budget, mainstream pink film, Daydream. Takechi would remake Daydream as Japan's first theatrical hardcore film in 1981, starring Kyoko Aizome.

=== North Korea ===
In 2007 the Seoul-based online newspaper Daily NK reported that pornographic literature was produced in North Korea for high-ranking officials during the late 1990s. Some pornographic films showing nude or scantily-clad women dancing to music were also made. In the 2000s these were superseded by imported pornographic films, for which a public rental market developed.

Imported works of pornography have been available in North Korea in recent decades, mainly in the capital Pyongyang and typically in the form of CD-R copies bought secretly at markets. There is very little domestic production. Producing, distributing, importing and watching pornography is illegal.

Importing pornography to North Korea is harshly punished. Pornography is sold openly on the China–North Korea border regardless of regulations. Despite attempts to curtail circulation of imported pornography, most of the pornography watched in North Korea is currently made abroad. A significant part of pornographic media in circulation consists of Chinese bootleg recordings of poor quality.

There is no access to foreign pornographic websites from within North Korea.

North Korea has ratified the Optional Protocol on the Sale of Children, Child Prostitution and Child Pornography of the Convention on the Rights of the Child. However, there are currently no specific laws to combat child pornography.

=== South Korea ===
Hardcore pornographic books, films, magazines, photographs, or other materials depicting exposed genitals are illegal in South Korea. The regulations are similar to those in Japan, but South Korea's rules are more restrictive and do not allow the depiction of intercourse with the genitals pixellated. Distribution of pornography can result in a fine or one-year prison sentence, although the law is not regularly enforced. Softcore pornography without exposed genitals is legal and can be sold with an R-rating (19 and over).

There is no penalty for viewing or possessing pornography on the Internet in South Korea with the exception of child pornography, for which possession carries a sentence of more than one year in prison, while distributing, selling or displaying it for commercial purposes carries a sentence of more than five years.

Since 2009, pornographic websites have been blocked by the South Korean government. In 2012 the Ministry of Public Administration and Security released statistics that cited 39.5% of South Korean children having experienced watching online pornography, with 14.2% of those who have viewed online pornography reportedly "wanting to imitate" it. Many foreign pornographic websites are blocked, and those found to be operating from within the country are shut down. The Korea Internet Safety Commission is responsible for instructing Internet service providers to block access to "pornography and nudity". Google Search in South Korea filters search results for around 700 terms considered by the government to be adult in nature unless the user demonstrates that they are aged over 19.

=== Taiwan ===
In Taiwan, pornographic films can be legally traded and pornography is available via a number of routes, including DVD, television and the Internet. The level of piracy of pornographic films in Taiwan is high because authorities have not traditionally recognised their copyrights. Copyright protection is usually strictly applied in Taiwan, but pornography has been seen as an exception.

== Southeast Asia ==
=== Brunei ===
Possession of pornographic material is illegal in Brunei.

=== Indonesia ===
The Indonesian criminal code (Kitab Undang-undang Hukum Pidana, KUHP), in conjunction with the Roman-Dutch law-based Indonesian legal system, strictly prohibits pornographic material. The creation, distribution, sale and rental of explicit materials is banned in the country. On 30 October 2008, the People's Representative Council (DPR) passed the Bill against Pornography and Pornoaction, but it was deemed controversial. The broadness of the law has concerned practitioners of regional traditions such as the nightclubs in Bali, West Javan jaipong dance, and New Guinean penis gourd wearing. In 2010 the anti-pornography law was challenged but Indonesia's Constitutional Court upheld the ban and stated that the law's definition of pornography was clear and did not violate the constitution. A law passed in 2010 states any "pictures, sketches, photos, writing, voice, sound, moving picture, animation, cartoons, conversation, gestures, or other communications shown in public with salacious content or sexual exploitation that violate the moral values of society" will have offenders face up to a 15-year jail sentence. With the maximum penalty for downloading pornographic material is a 4-year jail sentence or a 2 billion rupiah ($219,200) fine.

A revised criminal code (RUU KUHP) has been drafted and is currently being discussed by the DPR. There is controversy over the RUU (Law Proposal) because child abuse is already recognized by the KUHP and the RUU is deemed to meddle too much in domestic affairs.

=== Laos ===
Pornography is illegal in Laos. Decree No. 327 of October 2014 banned pornography and "inappropriate photos" from online publication, as well as "photos that contradict Lao traditions and culture".

=== Malaysia ===
Pornography is illegal in Malaysia with fines of up to RM10,000 for owning or sharing pornographic materials. The Malaysian Communications and Multimedia Commission (MCMC) has blocked more than 2,400 pornographic websites between 2018 and 2020. Possession of pornographic material is punished by Malaysian criminal law and results in fine and up to 5 years' imprisonment.

The Printing Presses and Publications Act of 1984 subjects all offline media (such as newspapers, television, and radio stations) to licensing regimes granted at the discretion of ministers. However, the Communications and Multimedia Act of 1998 pledged the Malaysian government to refrain from Internet censorship in Malaysia. Nevertheless, the Malaysian Communications and Multimedia Commission, the main regulatory authority of information technology and communications industries, prohibits online content that is "indecent" or "obscene".

In July 2018, the Malaysian police announced the creation of the Malaysian Internet Crime Against Children Investigation Unit (MICAC) that is equipped with real-time mass Internet surveillance software developed in the United States. It is tasked with the monitoring of all Malaysian Internet users even on mobile phones, with a focus on pornography, especially child pornography. The system creates a "data library" of users which includes details such as IP addresses, websites, locations, duration and frequency of use, and files uploaded and downloaded. Visiting these websites is subject to either questioning by police or imprisonment.

=== Myanmar ===
Pornographic material is prohibited in Myanmar. Many users of the Internet in Myanmar cannot access content outside the country, and a significant number of pornographic websites are blocked using content-control software.

=== Philippines ===
Any kind of pornography is illegal in the Philippines. This is due to the influence of conservative Christian groups, such as the Catholic Bishops Conference of the Philippines, and churches, mainly the Roman Catholic Church, among other institutions.

Since 14 January 2017, several pornographic websites including Pornhub and XVideos have been blocked in the Philippines upon the order of President Rodrigo Duterte as part of his Republic Act 9775 or Anti-Child Pornography Law. However, there are a few Internet service providers in the country which still allow access to these websites.

=== Singapore ===
In Singapore the government agency responsible for regulating media content is the Info-communications Media Development Authority (prior to 2016 the Media Development Authority). It is not a crime or offence to visit pornographic websites and view their content except for downloading, which is prohibited. It is deemed illegal to provide and/or supply any form of pornography from within the country. It is also an offence to be in possession of pornographic material. The Yangtze Cinema, opened on 27 January 1977, which was probably the only theatre on the island to primarily screen softcore films in the city-state, also closed its doors on February 29, 2016.

=== Thailand ===
The 287th section of the Thai Penal Code makes it a criminal offence to produce, distribute or possess obscene materials for the purpose of trade. The maximum penalty is up to 3 years' imprisonment or a fine not exceeding THB6,000 or both. Despite this, pornography is widely available in Thailand and the law remains usually unenforced with the exception of some high-profile cases. On November 3, 2020, The Ministry of Digital Economy and Society announced that it has banned Pornhub, along with 190 other pornographic websites. The ministry stated that the ban was part of the efforts to restrict access to pornography and gambling websites, which remains illegal in Thailand. Many types of pornography are prohibited in Thailand but law enforcement is lax and the prohibition is poorly enforced. Some religious minorities may possess pornography for personal use legally because possession for personal use is legal. Other forms of pornography such as yaoi and hentai are illegal but are common over the Internet. The popular Thai actor, model and singer Penpak Sirikul has been a pioneer in Thai pornography.

=== Vietnam ===
Production, distribution, broadcasting, transport, import and advertisement of pornography, is strictly illegal in Vietnam. In 1996 officials became concerned about pornographic films in the country and launched a campaign, with courts awarding fines and prison sentences. Pornography in Vietnam is classed as a "social evil".

== South Asia ==
=== Bangladesh ===
In 2012, the government in Bangladesh attempted to outlaw pornography as a result of the passing of the Pornography Control Act. Information and telecommunication minister of 11th parliamentary government of Bangladesh, Mostafa Zabbar blocked nearly 20,000 porn websites access in Bangladesh from November 2018 to February 2019. By passing the "Pornography Control Act, 2012", the government of Bangladesh prohibited the carrying, exchanging, using, selling, marketing, distributing, preserving, filming etc. of pornography (sexually explicit materials, unless it has artistic and/or educational value). Penalties include a maximum of 10 years in prison and fines up to Tk500,000 (US$6,410).

=== Bhutan ===
Pornography in Bhutan is strictly forbidden. It is defined in Section 476 (A) of the Bhutan Penal Code of 2004, which states, "A defendant shall be guilty of the offence of computer pornography if the defendant publishes and distributes an obscene photography or picture on the computer or over the internet."

=== India ===
- The publishing or transmission of pornographic material is illegal in India under section 292
- The distribution, sale, or circulation of obscene materials and the selling of pornographic content to any person under age 20 years are illegal under section 293 and IT Act-67B.
- Child pornography is illegal and strictly prohibited across the country under section 67B of the Information Technology Act, 2000
- The manufacturing, publishing and distribution of pornography is illegal in India under section 292, 293.

In July 2015 the Supreme Court of India refused to allow the blocking of pornographic websites and said that watching pornography indoors in the privacy of ones own home was not a crime. The court rejected an interim order blocking pornographic websites in the country. In August 2015 the Government of India issued an order to Indian ISPs to block at least 857 websites that it considered to be pornographic. In 2015 the Department of Telecommunications (DoT) had asked internet service providers to take down 857 websites in a bid to control cyber crime, but after receiving criticism from the authorities it partially rescinded the ban. The ban from the government came after a lawyer filed a petition in the Supreme Court arguing that online pornography encourages sex crimes and rapes. In February 2016 the Supreme Court asked the Indian Government to suggest ways of banning all forms of child pornography.

In October 2018 the government directed Internet service providers to block 827 websites that host pornographic content following an order by the Uttarakhand High Court, according to official sources. Although the Uttarakhand High Court had asked for the blocking of 857 websites, the Ministry of Electronics and IT (Meity) discovered that 30 of these had no pornographic content and removed them from the list. The court asked the Department of Telecommunications (DoT) to ban pornographic websites in India, citing an incident in Dehradun where a 10th standard girl was raped by four of her seniors. The accused later told police that they did so after watching pornographic content on the Internet. Following the order from the Uttarakhand High Court and the regulations of the DoT, Internet Service Providers in India banned pornographic websites across the country.

=== Maldives ===
The production, possession, sale, dissemination, distribution, or importation of pornography or pornographic material (including sex toys) is illegal in Maldives. There were attempts by the government to block pornographic websites. However, it is still accessible in the country as long it is viewed at home.

=== Nepal ===
Nepali law identifies pornography as illegal and unethical. The sharing, distribution and broadcasting of pornographic content through any medium is prohibited. In 2010 it was reported that the Home Ministry had banned access to a list of websites including explicitly adult websites. In September 2018, concerns about violence against women led the Government of Nepal to announce its intention to ban online pornography. From 24 September, the Nepal Telecommunications Authority (NTA) began to put a block on all websites providing pornographic content on the orders of the Nepal Government Ministry of Communication and Information Technology (MOCIT). By 12 October more than 21,000 pornographic websites had been blocked.

=== Pakistan ===
Pornography in Pakistan is illegal and is subject to several legal provisions. Since November 2011 the Government has placed a complete ban on Internet websites containing pornographic material. The list of banned websites is updated on an ongoing basis. Despite this, child pornography is illegal and strictly forbidden in Pakistan and there are severe punishments for possessing or viewing child pornography which include a minimum of 14 years to 20 years in prison and a fine of 1 million Rupees. Pakistan also has cyber unit to curb child pornography within the country. The unit has a team of 40 members and one director-level official, who independently investigate the issue. The unit is integrated with the National Database and Registration Authority (NADRA) and Pakistan Telecommunication Authority (PTA). It is not easily accessible, and the government has put an all-time ban on websites containing such material since November 2011. The list of banned pornographic websites is updated on an ongoing basis.

=== Sri Lanka ===
In 2010, the government banned more than 100 local and international porn sites and arrested people with pornography on their mobile phones. They also published the photos of 83 Sri Lankan porn stars, who they wanted to arrest.

== Central Asia ==
=== Kazakhstan ===
The legal status of pornography in Kazakhstan was changed in 2013 with the introduction of the law: "On Ratification of the International Convention for Suppression of the Circulation and Traffic of Obscene Publications". This made it illegal to produce, possess or advertise pornography for the purpose of sale, circulation or public display. Additionally, the law made it a criminal offence to import or export pornography or run a pornography business.

=== Turkmenistan ===
Even though the legal status of pornography in Turkmenistan is unknown, a law, passed on 1 January 2015, banning citizens to access pornography on the Internet infers that pornography is illegal in Turkmenistan.

== South Caucasus ==
=== Azerbaijan ===
In Azerbaijan in accordance with article 3 of the Media Act of 7 December 1999, "pornographic materials" are defined as works of art, photographic reproductions of paintings, information and other materials the main content of which is the crude and undignified depiction of the anatomical and physiological aspects of sexual relations. Pornography in Azerbaijan is easily and cheaply obtainable in Baku, although not in most other places. There are reports of bribes being charged for taking hardcore pornography across the country's borders. Meanwhile, the legal activity to combat child pornography is governed by 1998 Rights of the Child Act, 1999 Media Act, the Plan of Measures to Solve the Problem of Homeless and Street Children and the National Plan of Action to Combat Trafficking in Persons.

== Middle East ==
=== Iran ===
Pornography is illegal in Iran. However, due to widespread Internet access (in particular, downloading programs) and the existence of a large-scale black market in Western films, pornography is called "super film." In Iran, a law was passed in mid-2007 by parliament but still required approval of the Guardian Council, producers of pornographic films face execution if found guilty.

=== Iraq ===
Pornography is illegal in Iraq.

=== Israel ===
Pornography is legal in Israel. Pornographic films in Israel began to be produced in the 1990s, but most of the films were shot in the early 2000s. Any kind of child pornography is strictly forbidden (under the age of 18).

=== Lebanon ===
The production and distribution of pornography films are illegal in Lebanon. Regulation of Internet pornography is relatively light. In September 2011, four members of a criminal ring involved in the sale of pornographic films were arrested by Lebanese authorities. The men, of Lebanese and Syrian nationality, had been promoting the sale of unlicensed copies of pornographic DVDs in different areas of the country, particularly Byblos, north of Beirut, where they were apprehended. The men were referred to the relevant authorities, with the case investigated to uncover the remaining members of the ring and anyone else involved in the distribution of the pornographic films. In September 2011, A Syrian-Lebanese gang involved in promoting pornographic movies was arrested by the Lebanese general security forces, according to Lebanon's National News Agency. The group sold the films on DVDs in various regions in Lebanon.

=== Palestine ===
In 2008, Hamas attempted to implement Internet filters to block access to pornography in the Gaza Strip.

=== Saudi Arabia ===
Saudi Arabia prohibits all forms of pornography due to Islam's opposition to it. In 2000 Saudi authorities said that they were "winning the war against pornography on the internet". Items considered pornographic by Saudi Arabian standards are forbidden in the country. Customs authorities enforce strict regulations concerning the importation of pornographic items into Saudi Arabia. Such items may be confiscated on arrival and the owner may be subject to a fine. However, there were episodes in which Saudi women produced and participated in pornographic videos. In 2022, 20 young women were arrested on charges of producing and featuring in illegal material distributed via social media.

Most pornography crimes in Saudi Arabia involve child pornography.

=== Syria ===
Pornography is banned in the country. The government has blocked access to around 160 websites.

=== Turkey ===
Turkey is one of the few areas in Asia where pornography is allowed and produced. The industry can be traced all the way back to the 1970s since its inception.

== See also ==
- Pornography by region
- Pornography in the Americas
- Pornography in Europe
