= Pornography in the Americas =

Pornography in the Americas consists of pornography made and viewed in North, Central and South American and Caribbean countries and territories. The culture of Latin America and French America has traditionally been strongly influenced by the Roman Catholic Church, which tends to be socially conservative. Pornography is least restricted and essentially legal in those countries where the Catholic church is politically and socially the weakest, such as Brazil, Colombia and Mexico. The viewing of pornography in the region has been popularized by the Internet and DVDs.

Pornography between consenting adults is legal in many American countries including Colombia and Uruguay.

== Bahamas ==
The Bahamian penal code prohibits the production and distribution of obscene publications. Many types of pornography are prohibited in the Bahamas, however law enforcement is relaxed and does not usually enforce the prohibition. Pornography is available on Bahamian cable television and in 2014 ZNS-TV broadcast a report on the establishment of a local pornography industry in the Bahamas.

== Brazil ==
In Brazil, pornographic film actors must be 18 or older. Pornography which does not involve bestiality or juvenile pornography is legal when sold in public places. Depiction of sex with non-human animals is legal. However, magazine and DVD covers that depict genitalia must not be visible from public view, and pornography can only be sold to people 18 or older. As of August 2026, fictional child pornography may constitute criminal offenses under art. 241-E of the Child and Adolescent Statute (ECA).

== Canada ==
The laws of Canada permit the sale of hardcore pornography to anyone over the age of eighteen. While persons below that age may have pornography in their possession, its sale to them is prohibited. Most hardcore pornography is sold in adult stores or on adult websites.

== Chile ==
Chile's pornography industry began in the 1950s and grew significantly until the 1973 Chilean coup d'état. Under the subsequent military dictatorship of Chile the industry was suppressed. Following the Chilean transition to democracy and the development of the Internet, the pornography industry in the country has begun to expand again.

== Colombia ==
Colombia has become a big hub for live web cam streams and has seen a rise in camgirls as a result of the increase in access to the internet.

== Cuba ==
Pornography was illegal in Cuba during Fidel Castro's leadership of the country, but the laws were relaxed in the 2010s. Currently, Cuba restricts online pornography.

== United States ==
In the United States, courts have repeatedly confirmed that obscenity is not legal in the United States; it is not entitled to the freedom of the press protection contained in the First Amendment to the United States Constitution. Pornography has become semi-legal, then in practice legal, because it has been "shown" not to be obscene.

Distinguishing between "pornography" and "obscenity" is conducted using the Miller test, which was developed in the 1973 case Miller v. California. The Miller test has three parts:

- Whether "the average person, applying contemporary community standards", would find that the work, taken as a whole, appeals to the prurient interest,
- Whether the work depicts or describes, in a patently offensive way, sexual conduct specifically defined by applicable state law,
- Whether the work, taken as a whole, lacks serious literary, artistic, political, or scientific value. (Note: This is also known as the (S)LAPS test—an initialism for the [serious] literary, artistic, political, and scientific value.)

The work is considered obscene only if all three conditions are satisfied. Local areas are permitted to develop their own laws on the issue, as long as they do not conflict with federal law.

Pornography is a large industry that involves major entertainment companies, which offer pornography films through cable channels and in-room movies in hotels. Pornography distribution changed radically during the 1980s, with VHS and cable television largely displacing X-rated theaters. VHS distribution, in turn, has been replaced by DVD and Internet distribution for niche markets. Pornography generates billions of dollars in sales in the United States alone. An estimated 211 new pornographic films are made every week in the United States.

The following four forms of pornography are specifically unlawful at the federal level.

1. Child pornography
  - The commercial production of child pornography was first made unlawful beginning in 1977, but child pornography itself was not made categorically unlawful until 1984.
  - Most of the current penal statutes are codified in chapter 110 of the United States Code.
2. Animal crush fetish pornography
  - Animal crush fetish pornography was first made unlawful in 1999, but that initial law was ruled unconstitutional and revised in 2010.
  - The current penal statute is found at title 18, United States Code, section 48 thereof.
3. Video voyeurism pornography
  - Made unlawful in 2004, the current penal statute is found at title 18, United States Code, section 1801 thereof.
4. Revenge pornography
  - While the current prohibition carries no civil or criminal penalties, there exists a private right of action for victims.
  - This redress for victims is currently found at title 15, United States Code, section 6851 thereof.

== Venezuela ==
Despite the fact that in Venezuela pornography can be viewed through cable television systems, the government of that country has been taking anti-pornography stances since 2018. On June 19, it was reported that CANTV, the country's largest Internet provider, blocked access to three popular pornographic websites hosting user-generated content — namely, XVideos, PornHub and YouPorn. However, these three websites can be viewed through other providers, through IP or DNS changes, or through a VPN. Moreover, there are rumors that webcam sites could be banned in Venezuela.

== See also ==
- Pornography by region
- Pornography in Asia
- Pornography in Europe
