= Telefono rosso =

1986 Italian pornography film

Il telefono rosso
- Directed by: Riccardo Schicchi
- Starring: Ilona Staller
- Production company: Diva Futura
- Release date: 1986

Il telefono rosso is also the Italian title of Étienne Périer's 1968 comedy Le Rouble à deux faces.

Telefono rosso (Red Telephone) is a 1986 film, the first Italian hardcore pornography production. Starring Ilona Staller and directed by Riccardo Schicchi, it was produced by their company Diva Futura.

== Plot ==
Cicciolina wakes up in a muffled and unreal world, already made up and fully dressed and undertakes her job: to give happiness to men through telephone contact, precisely with the red telephone. After some telephone conversations that always end with an orgasm from the protagonist, Cicciolina decides to seriously meet her loyalists but does nothing but get trouble on trouble, first with a truck driver who surprises her to call random numbers in a cabin by telephone outside Rome, then with patrons met in a sort of cruising always just outside the capital. It all ends with an orgy.
