= Love Party (Italy) =

Love Party Partito dell'Amore
- Abbreviation: PdA
- President: Ilona Staller
- Secretary(s): Riccardo Schicchi (1991–92); Moana Pozzi (1992–94); Mauro Biuzzi (1994)
- Founded: 12 July 1991
- Headquarters: Via Cassia, 1818 – 00123, Rome
- Ideology: Free love Libertarianism
- Political position: Centre
- Colours: Pink

Website
- partitodellamore.it

Love Party (Italian: Partito dell'Amore, PdA) is a political party in Italy. The party was co-founded on 12 July 1991, by pornographic actresses Moana Pozzi and Ilona Staller (Cicciolina); at the time, the latter was a member of the Chamber of Deputies, having been elected in 1987 as a Radical Party candidate. Pozzi died on 15 September 1994. The party has not contested elections since 1994 in protest of Italian politics and has largely been out of the public eye since then; however, it has not been officially dissolved, and has advocated electoral reform since 2008.

== Political line ==
The party was organized by Riccardo Schicchi, Cicciolina's manager, as a parody of the traditional political parties. However, it was later identified as a counterculture movement by exponents Mauro Biuzzi and Marcella Zingarini. The party supports the legalisation of brothels and improved sex education.

== Elections ==
After a brief alliance with Carlo Fatuzzo's Pensioner's Party in 1991, Pozzi ran unsuccessfully for the parliament at the general election in 1992. In 1993, Pozzi ran for Mayor of Rome.

== See also ==
- Australian Sex Party
- One Love Party
- Prostitution in Italy
