= Cicciolina (song) =

Single by Erika Vikman

from the album Erika Vikman
- Released: 27 January 2020
- Genre: Disco
- Length: 2:58
- Label: Warner Music Finland; Mökkitie Records
- Songwriters: Janne Rintala; Mika Laakkonen; Erika Vikman; Saskia Vanhalakka
- Producer: Mika Laakkonen

Erika Vikman singles chronology
"Jos osaisin sanoa ei" (2017)	"Cicciolina" (2020)	"Syntisten pöytä" (2020)

"Cicciolina" is a song recorded by Finnish singer Erika Vikman, and written by Vikman, Janne Rintala, Mika Laakkonen, and Saskia Vanhalakka, with production handled by Laakkonen. The song was released through Warner Music Finland and Mökkitie Records on 27 January 2020, as the lead single from Vikman's self-titled debut album, after having been announced as one of the competing entries in Uuden Musiikin Kilpailu 2020, the Finnish national selection for the Eurovision Song Contest 2020. Vikman performed the song during the final of Uuden Musiikin Kilpailu on 7 March 2020, where it finished as the runner-up.

Lyrically inspired by the Hungarian-Italian pornographic actress-turned-politician Ilona Staller, also known by her stage name Cicciolina, critics described the song as a Finnish disco track, influenced by Finnish singers such as Kikka Sirén and Frederik. Following Uuden Musiikin Kilpailu, "Cicciolina" went on to peak at number-5 on The Official Finnish Charts, becoming Vikman's first top ten hit.

== Background and composition ==
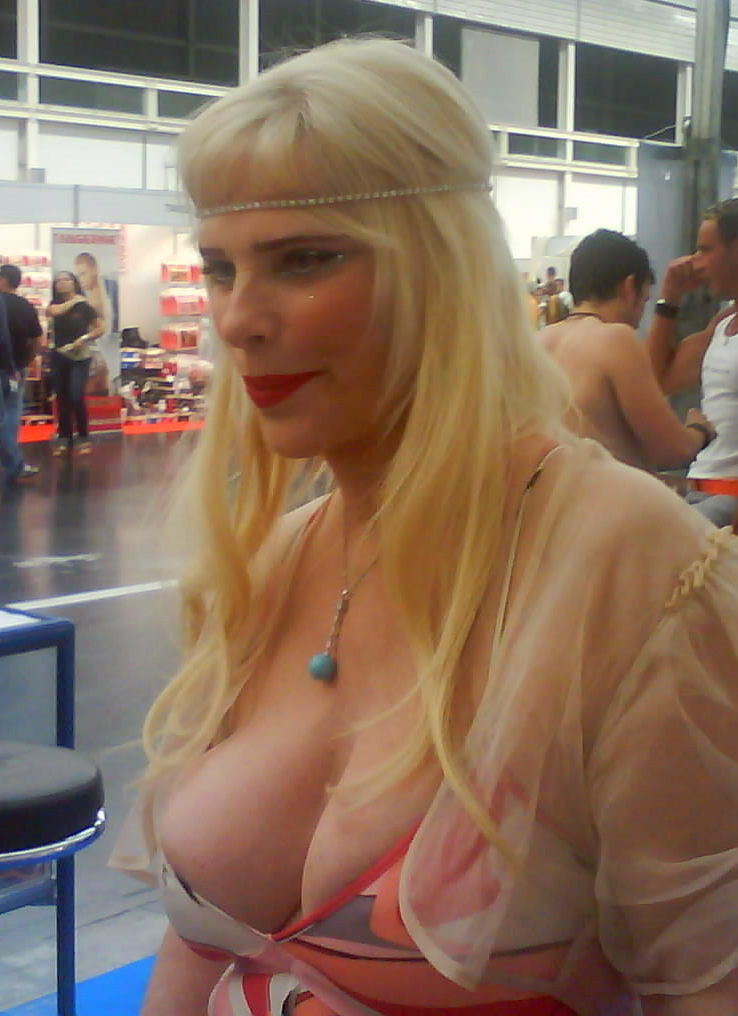
"Cicciolina" was inspired by the life of Hungarian-Italian pornographic actress-turned-politician Ilona Staller (pictured in 2009), also known by her stage name Cicciolina.

The song was composed by Vikman, Janne Rintala, Mika Laakkonen, and Saskia Vanhalakka, while production was handled by Laakkonen. The song's production had been influenced by the late Finnish singer Kikka Sirén, whom Vikman had intended the song to be a tribute to.

Vikman had been inspired to write the song after seeing a documentary on the life of Hungarian-Italian pornographic actress-turned-politician Ilona Staller, also known by her stage name Cicciolina. After informing Rintala and Laakkonen, they were also intrigued by Staller and wished to write a song about her. The song's Finnish lyrics do not speak of the life of Staller directly, but instead allude to brave women in general. According to Vikman, the song's lyrics convey a feminist message advocating for women to live their lives boldly, and encouraging people to live freely without caring what others think of them. One of the lyrics' main points is to address that femininity and feminism are not mutually exclusive.

Yle journalist Anni Gullichsen described the song as "a brisk Finnish disco where sexual freedom is not hidden", while also acknowledging the influence from Sirén. Mari Pudas of Iltalehti also compared the song to the music of Sirén and other Finnish disco music of the past, while Anton Vanha-Majamaa of Yle compared the song to Sirén and Finnish singer Frederik.

== Uuden Musiikin Kilpailu 2020 ==
"Cicciolina" was announced as one of the six competing entries in Uuden Musiikin Kilpailu 2020 on 26 January 2020. Uuden Musiikin Kilpailu serves as the Finnish national selection for the Eurovision Song Contest, with the winner of the 2020 edition receiving the right to represent Finland at the Eurovision Song Contest 2020 in Rotterdam. The final of the competition was held on 7 March 2020 at Mediapolis in Tampere, and aired live on Yle TV1.

Vikman was drawn to perform the song second during the broadcast, following Catharina Zühlke with the song "Eternity" and preceding Aksel Kankaanranta with the song "Looking Back". During the voting sequence, "Cicciolina" received the most votes from the Finnish public, receiving 99 points, but placed third with the professional music juries, receiving 58 points; this led to a total of 157 points, placing the song second behind Kankaanranta and "Looking Back", which had scored 170 points. The 2020 edition of the Eurovision Song Contest was later canceled due to the COVID-19 pandemic, and Kankaanranta was not invited back to the Eurovision Song Contest 2021.

== Track listing ==
Digital download
No.	Title	Length
1.	"Cicciolina"	2:58

== Charts ==
2020 weekly chart performance
Chart (2020)	Peak position
Finland (Suomen virallinen lista)	5
Finland Airplay (Radiosoittolista)	16

2021 weekly chart performance
Chart (2021)	Peak position
Finland Airplay (Radiosoittolista)	36

2022 weekly chart performance
Chart (2022)	Peak position
Finland Airplay (Radiosoittolista)	54

2023 weekly chart performance
Chart (2023)	Peak position
Finland Airplay (Radiosoittolista)	79

2024 weekly chart performance
Chart (2024)	Peak position
Finland Airplay (Radiosoittolista)	92

2025 weekly chart performance
Chart (2025)	Peak position
Finland Airplay (Radiosoittolista)	91

2026 weekly chart performance
Chart (2026)	Peak position
Finland Airplay (Radiosoittolista)	89
