= Erika Vikman =

Finnish singer and songwriter (born 1993)

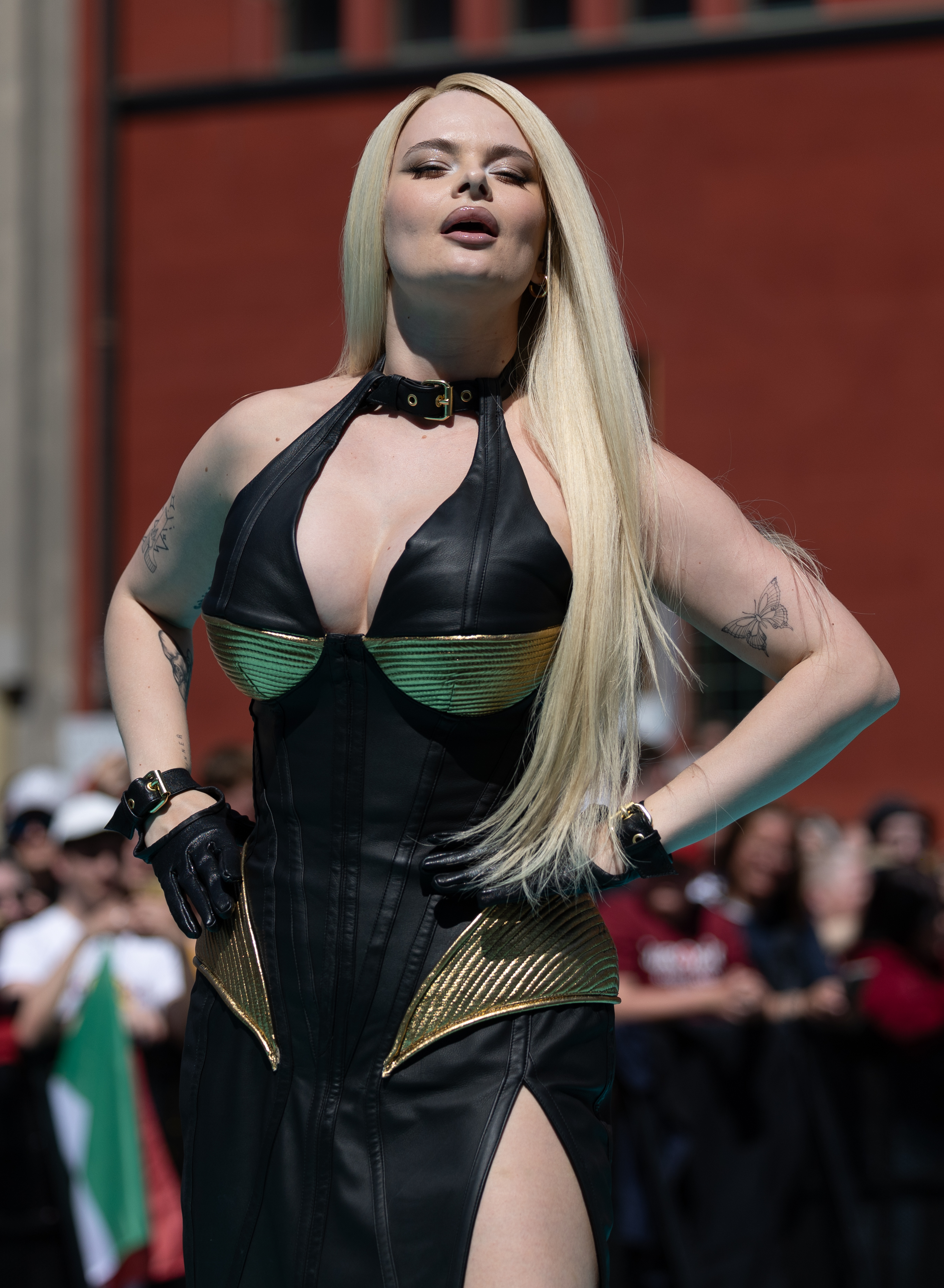
- Vikman in 2025

Background information
- Born: Erika Susanna Vikman; 20 February 1993 (age 33); Tampere, Finland
- Genres: Electropop; tango (early)
- Occupations: Singer; songwriter
- Instrument: Vocals
- Years active: 2013–present
- Labels: Sony; Warner Music Finland

Erika Susanna Vikman (Finnish: [ˈeːrikɑ ˈsusɑnːɑ ˈʋiːkmɑn]; born 20 February 1993) is a Finnish singer and songwriter. Beginning her career as a Finnish tango singer, Vikman first received recognition after winning Tangomarkkinat in 2016. She later received further nationwide attention following the release of the single "Cicciolina" in 2020, which became her first top five hit in Finland. Her debut self-titled studio album was released the following year, and topped the charts in Finland. She represented Finland in the Eurovision Song Contest 2025 with the song "Ich komme".

== Early life and education ==
Vikman was born on 20 February 1993 in Tampere. She later grew up in Lempäälä and Pori. Her mother was also a singer, who sang Finnish tango music and competed in Tangomarkkinat. She has a younger sister named Jennika, who is also a singer. Vikman began singing as a teenager, and won the girls' division in the 2008 Junior Tango Competition. She later also participated in the 2010 Tampere Springboard Competition.

Vikman attended Tampere Upper Secondary School of Performing Arts (Tampereen Yhteiskoulun Lukio), and graduated with her upper secondary school diploma in 2013. Afterwards, she also studied pop-jazz vocals at Pirkanmaa Music College.

== Career ==
=== 2013–2019: Tango career and Tangomarkkinat 2016 ===
Vikman began her professional career in 2013, after she was selected to be a contestant in season seven of the Finnish version of Idols. She was selected as one of the twelve finalists, and was later eliminated during the 7 November 2013 episode, placing ninth. She later was brought back as a wildcard on the 28 November episode, but was eliminated again that week, ultimately placing seventh.

Following her departure from Idols, Vikman established herself as a Finnish tango singer. She competed in Tangomarkkinat in 2015, where she finished in second place. Vikman later returned to the competition the following year and won, being crowned the Tango Queen of Finland for 2016. Following the competition, Vikman later signed with Sony Music, and released her first single with the label, "Ettei mee elämä hukkaan", in 2017. The song saw Vikman experimenting more with electropop music.

=== 2020–present: "Cicciolina", mainstream success and Eurovision ===
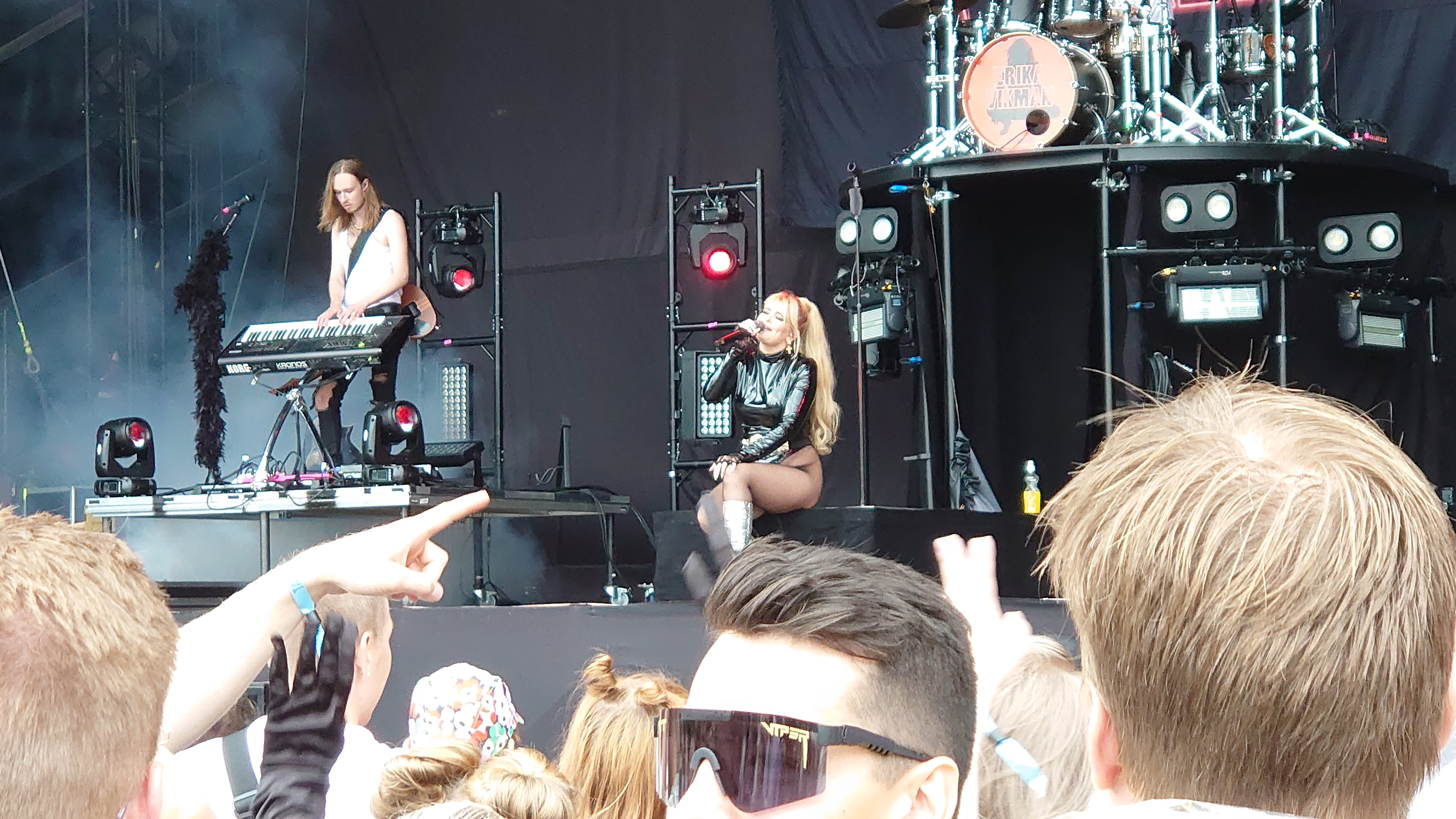
Erika Vikman performing at Tammerfest in 2022

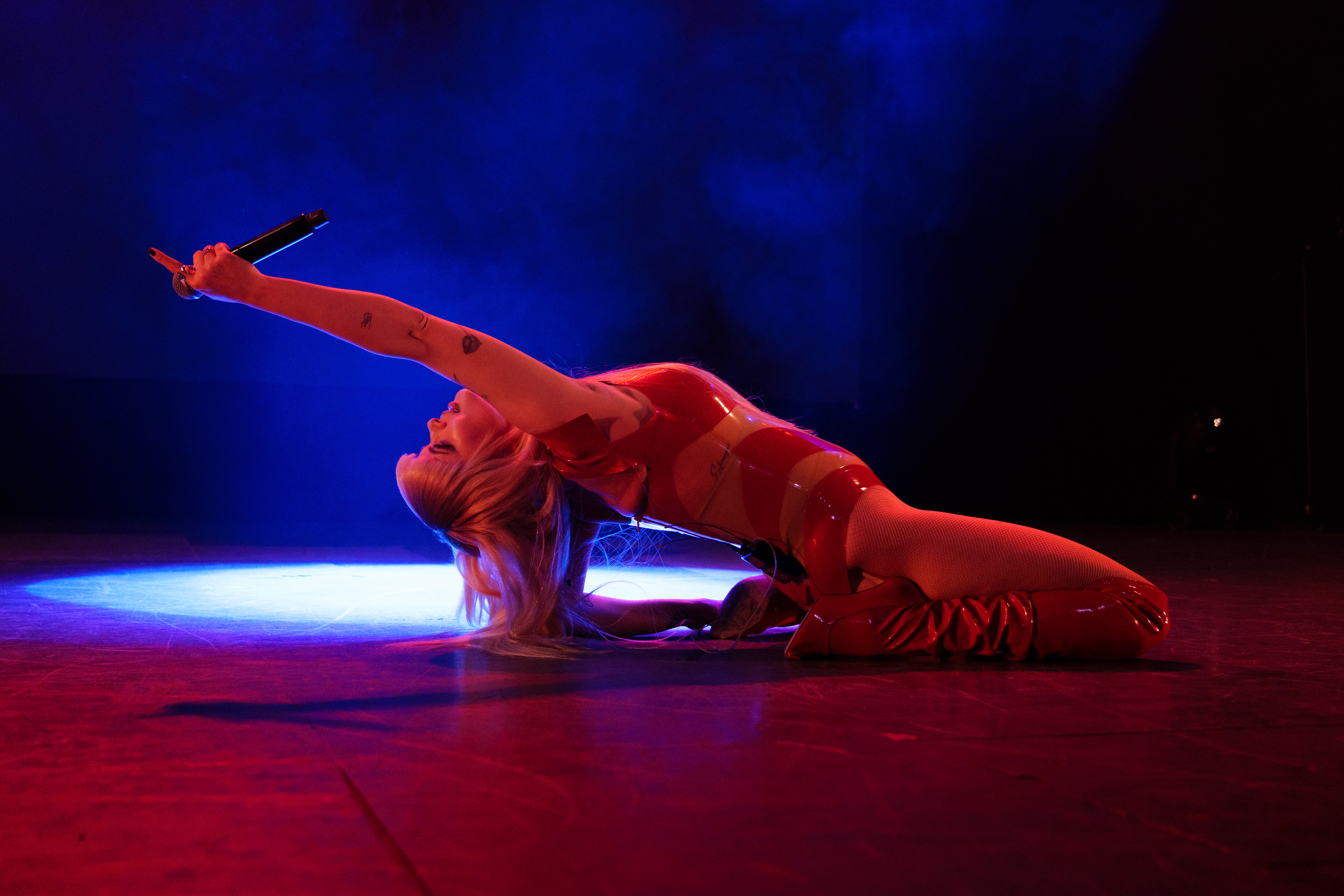
Vikman performing at the PrepartyES Eurovision pre-party event in 2025

In 2020, Vikman inked with Warner Music Finland and was approved by Yle to be competing in Uuden Musiikin Kilpailu 2020, the Finnish national selection for the Eurovision Song Contest 2020. In the competition, she performed the song "Cicciolina", written about the Hungarian-Italian pornographic actress Ilona Staller, who performed under the stage name Cicciolina. Vikman competed in the competition final on 7 March 2020 in Tampere, where she placed second; she received the most votes from the Finnish public, but the professional jury ranked her only third. Despite only placing second, the song went on to become a hit in Finland, becoming her first top five single. Following the success of "Cicciolina", Vikman later released the follow-up single "Syntisten pöytä", which became her second top five hit, and later first number one radio hit. Also in 2020, Vikman placed third in season one of Masked Singer Suomi, competing as "The Wasp".

Vikman released her debut self-titled studio album in August 2021. The album went on to peak at number-one in Finland, becoming Vikman's first number-one album. In May 2022, it was announced that Vikman would appear in season thirteen of Vain elämää, the Finnish version of The Best Singers.

In 2025, it was confirmed that Vikman would compete at Uuden Musiikin Kilpailu 2025 with the song "Ich komme". She later won and represented Finland in the Eurovision Song Contest 2025. She qualified for the finals where she finished 11th with 196 points.

== Personal life ==
From 2016 until 2020, Vikman was in a relationship with Finnish singer Danny. The relationship was controversial due to their age gap, with Danny being 50 years older than Vikman. They resided together in Kirkkonummi until their separation. She came out as bisexual in 2020.

== Discography ==
=== Albums ===
Title	Details	Peak chart positions
Title	Details	FIN
Erika Vikman	Released: 20 August 2021; Label: Warner Music Finland, Mökkitie Records; Formats: LP, CD, digital download, streaming	1

=== EPs ===
Title	Details	Peak chart positions
Title	Details	FIN
Erikavision	Release date: 16 May 2025; Label: Warner Music Finland, Mökkitie Records; Formats: LP, CD	18

=== Singles ===
List of singles, with selected chart positions
Title	Year	Peak chart positions						Album or EP
Title	Year	FIN	AUT	LTU	NOR	SWE	SWI	Album or EP
"Etkö uskalla mua rakastaa"	2015	—	—	—	—	—	—	Non-album singles
"Ettei mee elämä hukkaan"	2017	— (Note: "Ettei mee elämä hukkaan" did not enter the Official Finnish Singles Chart, but peaked at number 70 on the Official Finnish Airplay Chart.)	—	—	—	—	—	Non-album singles
"Säännöt"	2017	— (Note: "Säännöt" did not enter the Official Finnish Singles Chart, but peaked at number 78 on the Official Finnish Airplay Chart.)	—	—	—	—	—	Non-album singles
"Jos osaisin sanoa ei"	2017	—	—	—	—	—	—	Non-album singles
"Cicciolina"	2020	5	—	—	—	—	—	Erika Vikman
"Syntisten pöytä"	2020	3	—	—	—	—	—	Erika Vikman
"Häpeä"	2021	15	—	—	—	—	—	Erika Vikman
"Tääl on niin kuuma" (with Arttu Wiskari)	2021	6	—	—	—	—	—	Erika Vikman
"Huonoja ideoita" (with Antti Tuisku)	2021	12	—	—	—	—	—	Non-album singles
"Elizabeth Taylor"	2023	46	—	—	—	—	—	Non-album singles
"Ruoska" (with Käärijä)	2024	1	—	—	—	—	—	People's Champion
"Aivan sama" (with Janna and F)	2024	42	—	—	—	—	—	Ihminen
"Myynnissä"	2024	34	—	—	—	—	—	Erikavision
"Ich komme"	2025	2	48	17	72	38	56	Erikavision
"Appetite" (with Go-Jo)	2025	—	—	—	—	—	—	The Go-Jo Variety Show
"Father (I Will Never Confess)"	2026	—	—	—	—	—	—	Non-album singles
"Adam & Steve"	2026	—	—	—	—	—	—	Non-album singles
"—" denotes a recording that did not chart or was not released in that territory.

== Awards and nominations ==
Year	Award	Category	Nominee(s)	Result	Ref.
2025	Uuden Musiikin Kilpailu (UMK)	"Ich Komme"	Herself	Won	
2025	Eurovision Awards	Style Icon	Herself	Won	

== Notes ==
Awards and achievements
Preceded by Windows95man with "No Rules!"	Finland in the Eurovision Song Contest; 2025	Succeeded by Linda Lampenius and Pete Parkkonen with "Liekinheitin"
