= Finland in the Eurovision Song Contest 2020 =

- Eurovision Song Contest 2020
- Participating broadcaster: Yleisradio (Yle)
- Country: Finland
- Selection process: Uuden Musiikin Kilpailu 2020
- Selection date: 7 March 2020

Competing entry
- Song: "Looking Back"
- Artist: Aksel Kankaanranta
- Songwriters: Joonas Angeria; Whitney Phillips; Connor McDonough; Riley McDonough; Toby McDonough

Placement
- Final result: Contest cancelled

Participation chronology

Finland was set to be represented at the Eurovision Song Contest 2020 with the song "Looking Back" written by Joonas Angeria, Whitney Phillips, Connor McDonough, Riley McDonough, and Toby McDonough, and performed by Aksel Kankaanranta. The Finnish participating broadcaster, Yleisradio (Yle), organised the national final Uuden Musiikin Kilpailu 2020 in order to select its entry for the contest. Six entries were selected to compete in the national final on 7 March 2020 where the 50/50 combination of votes from eight international jury groups and votes from the public selected "Looking Back" performed by Aksel Kankaanranta as the winner.

Finland was drawn to compete in the second semi-final of the Eurovision Song Contest which took place on 14 May 2020. However, the contest was cancelled due to the COVID-19 pandemic.

== Background ==
Prior to the 2020 contest, Yleisradio (Yle) had participated in the Eurovision Song Contest representing Finland fifty-three times since its first entry in 1961. It has won the contest once in 2006 with the song "Hard Rock Hallelujah" performed by Lordi. In 2019, "Look Away" performed by Darude featuring Sebastian Rejman failed to qualify Finland to the final, placing seventeenth (last) in the semi-final.

As part of its duties as participating broadcaster, Yle organises the selection of its entry in the Eurovision Song Contest and broadcasts the event in the country. The broadcaster confirmed its intentions to participate at the 2019 contest on 3 June 2019. Yle had selected its entries for the contest through national final competitions that have varied in format over the years. Between 1961 and 2011, a selection show that was often titled Euroviisukarsinta highlighted that the purpose of the program was to select a song for Eurovision. However, since 2012, the broadcaster has organised the selection show Uuden Musiikin Kilpailu (UMK), which focuses on showcasing new music with the winning song being selected as the Finnish entry for that year. Along with its participation confirmation, the broadcaster also announced that its entry for the 2020 contest would be selected through Uuden Musiikin Kilpailu 2020, reverting to an open selection with multiple artists and songs; Yle opted to internally select the artist with the song selected through Uuden Musiikin Kilpailu in 2018 and 2019.

== Before Eurovision ==
=== Uuden Musiikin Kilpailu 2020 ===
Uuden Musiikin Kilpailu 2020 was the ninth edition of Uuden Musiikin Kilpailu (UMK), the music competition that selects Finland's entries for the Eurovision Song Contest. The competition consisted of a final on 7 March 2020, held at the Mediapolis in Tampere and hosted by 2013 Finnish Eurovision entrant Krista Siegfrids with YleX hosts Ville Eerikkilän and Juuso Kallion hosting from the green room. The show was broadcast on Yle TV1 with a second audio program providing commentary in Finnish by Mikko Silvennoinen as well as in Swedish by Eva Frantz and Johan Lindroos. The competition was also broadcast online at Yle Areena as well as via radio on Yle Radio Suomi and Yle X3M. The competition was watched by 885,000 viewers in Finland.

==== Competing entries ====
A submission period was opened by Yle which lasted between 1 November 2019 and 8 November 2019. At least one of the writers and the lead singer(s) had to hold Finnish citizenship or live in Finland permanently in order for the entry to qualify to compete. A panel of ten experts appointed by Yle selected six entries for the competition from the 426 received submissions. The experts were Tapio Hakanen (Head of Music at YleX), Anssi Autio (UMK producer), Juha-Matti Valtonen (television director), Reija Wäre (choreographer), Samuli Väänänen (Senior Editor at Spotify Finland), Perttu Mäkelä (A&R manager at Etenee Records), Ida Karimaa (music journalist at YleX), Katri Norrlin (music journalist at YleX), Johan Lindroos (Head of Music at Yle Radio Suomi) and Amie Borgar (Head of Music at Yle X3M). The competing entries were presented during a live streamed press conference on 21 January 2020, hosted by Krista Siegfrids and Mikko Silvennoinen, while their lyric videos were released between 24 and 31 January 2020.

Artist	Song	Songwriter(s)
Aksel Kankaanranta	"Looking Back"	Joonas Angeria, Whitney Phillips, Connor McDonough, Riley McDonough, Toby McDonough
Catharina Zühlke	"Eternity"	Marcia "Misha" Sondeijker, Roel Rats, Josefine Myrberg, Henrik Tala, Catharina Zühlke
Erika Vikman	"Cicciolina"	Janne Rintala, Mika Laakkonen, Erika Vikman, Saskia Vanhalakka
F3M	"Bananas"	Olli Äkräs, Hanna Ollikainen, Rafael Elivuo
Sansa	"Lover View"	Sannaliisa Ilkka, Otto Yliperttula, Anton Sonin
Tika	"I Let My Heart Break"	Neea Jokinen, Timo Oiva, Oliver@ i-One Music, Lotus Wang

==== Final ====
The final took place on 7 March 2020 where six entries competed. "Looking Back" performed by Aksel Kankaanranta was selected as the winner by a 50/50 combination of public votes and eight international jury groups from Bulgaria, Estonia, Germany, Netherlands, Sweden, Spain, Russia and the United Kingdom. The viewers and the juries each had a total of 320 points to award. Each jury group distributed their points as follows: 4, 6, 8, 10 and 12 points. The viewer vote was based on the percentage of votes each song achieved through the following voting methods: telephone, SMS and app voting. For example, if a song gained 10% of the viewer vote, then that entry would be awarded 10% of 320 points rounded to the nearest integer: 32 points. A total of 114,664 votes were cast during the show. In addition to the performances of the competing entries, the interval act featured Behm performing her song "Hei rakas" and Mikael Gabriel performing his single "Löytäjä saa pitää".

Final – 7 March 2020
R/O	Artist	Song	Jury	Televote			Total	Place
R/O	Artist	Song	Jury	Votes	Percentage	Points	Total	Place
1	Catharina Zühlke	"Eternity"	42	8,600	7.5%	24	66	5
2	Erika Vikman	"Cicciolina"	58	35,431	30.9%	99	157	2
3	Aksel Kankaanranta	"Looking Back"	76	33,711	29.4%	94	170	1
4	F3M	"Bananas"	64	7,167	6.3%	20	84	4
5	Sansa	"Lover View"	30	2,121	1.8%	6	36	6
6	Tika	"I Let My Heart Break"	50	27,634	24.1%	77	127	3

Detailed International Jury Votes
R/O	Song	United Kingdom	Estonia	Germany	Bulgaria	Spain	Russia	Sweden	Netherlands	Total
R/O	Song	United Kingdom	Estonia	Germany	Bulgaria	Spain	Russia	Sweden	Netherlands	Total
1	"Eternity"		6	10		10	6	6	4	42
2	"Cicciolina"	12	4	8	4	12	4	4	10	58
3	"Looking Back"	10	12	12	12	4	12	8	6	76
4	"Bananas"	8	8	4	8	8	8	12	8	64
5	"Lover View"	4	10		10	6				30
6	"I Let My Heart Break"	6		6	6		10	10	12	50
International Jury Spokespersons
United Kingdom – William Lee Adams; Estonia – Laura Põldvere; Germany – Reinhard Ehret; Bulgaria – Poli Genova; Spain – Lucía Pérez; Russia – Tutta Larsen; Sweden – Elize Ryd; Netherlands – Erik Bolks

International Jury Members
Country	Members
United Kingdom	William Lee Adams; Ricardo Autobahn; Katya Edwards; Charlotte Haining
Estonia	Laura Põldvere; Erik Morna; Liis Lemsalu; Noëp; Heidy Purga
Germany	Reinhard Ehret; Frank Albers; Meike Vollmar; Felix Brand
Bulgaria	Poli Genova; Borislav Milanov; Vasil Ivanov; Georgi Simeonov
Spain	Lucía Pérez; Chema Purón; Vicente Rico; Xabier Vizcaino
Russia	Tutta Larsen; Elena Pindzhoyan; Marina Gubina; Oskar Kuchera
Sweden	Elize Ryd; Elina Ryd; Olof Mörck; Henrik Englund Wilhelmson
Netherlands	Erik Bolks; Roel Schaap; Sanne Messemaker; Anja Kroeze

== At Eurovision ==
According to Eurovision rules, all nations with the exceptions of the host country and the "Big Five" (France, Germany, Italy, Spain and the United Kingdom) are required to qualify from one of two semi-finals in order to compete for the final; the top ten countries from each semi-final progress to the final. The European Broadcasting Union (EBU) split up the competing countries into six different pots based on voting patterns from previous contests, with countries with favourable voting histories put into the same pot. On 28 January 2020, a special allocation draw was held which placed each country into one of the two semi-finals, as well as which half of the show they would perform in. Finland was placed into the second semi-final, to be held on 14 May 2020, and was scheduled to perform in the second half of the show. However, due to the COVID-19 pandemic, the contest was cancelled.

During the Eurovision Song Celebration YouTube broadcast in place of the semi-finals, it was revealed that Finland was set to perform in position 13, following the entry from Albania and before the entry from Armenia.

On 18 March 2020, the EBU announced that contest would be cancelled due to the COVID-19 pandemic.
