= Syntisten pöytä =

Single by Erika Vikman

from the album Erika Vikman
- Released: 21 August 2020
- Length: 3:43
- Label: Warner Music Finland; Mökkitie Records
- Songwriters: Kaisa Korhonen; Janne Rintala
- Producer: Mika Laakkonen

Erika Vikman singles chronology
"Cicciolina" (2020)	"Syntisten pöytä" (2020)	"Häpeä" (2021)

"Syntisten pöytä" is a song recorded by Finnish singer Erika Vikman, written by Kaisa Korhonen and Janne Rintala, and produced by Mika Laakkonen. The song was released through Warner Music Finland and Mökkitie Records on 21 August 2020, as the second single from Vikman's self-titled debut album. "Syntisten pöytä" went on to peak at number-3 on The Official Finnish Charts, becoming Vikman's second consecutive top ten hit, and her first number-one hit on the Finnish radio airplay charts.

"Syntisten pöytä" was also nominated for Song of the Year at the 2021 Emma-gaala.

== Music video ==
A music video to accompany the release of "Syntisten pöytä" was released on 21 August 2020 through Warner Music Finland's YouTube channel. It was directed by JIRINA.

== Track listing ==
Digital download
No.	Title	Length
1.	"Syntisten pöytä"	3:43

== Charts ==
Chart performance for "Syntisten pöytä"
Chart (2020)	Peak position
Finland (Suomen virallinen lista)	3
Finland Airplay (Radiosoittolista)	1
