= Éva Henger =

Italian-Hungarian actress, television personality, and model

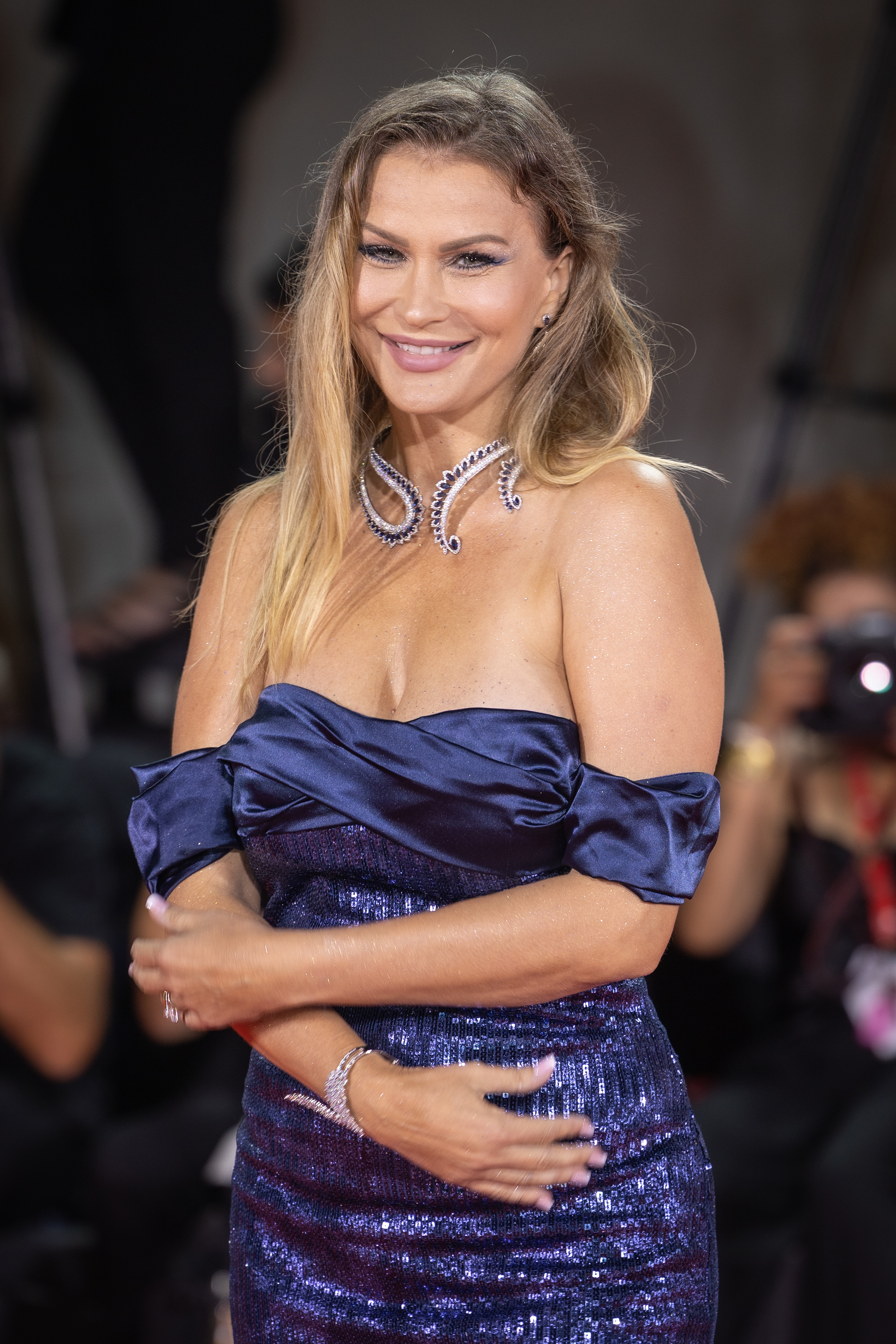
- Henger at the 2024 Venice Film Festival
- Born: 2 November 1972 (age 54); Győr, Győr–Moson–Sopron, Hungary
- Education: Prohászka Ottokár Orsolyita Gimnázium; Általános Iskola és Óvoda
- Occupations: Actress; television host; singer; showgirl; model; dancer; former pornographic actress
- Years active: 1986–present
- Spouses: Riccardo Schicchi (m. 1994; died 2012) Massimiliano Caroletti (m. 2013)
- Children: Mercédesz Henger; Riccardo Schicchi Jr.; Jennifer Caroletti
- Musical career
- Genres: EDM; hip-hop; trap
- Instruments: Vocals; piano
- Modeling information
- Height: 178 cm (5 ft 10 in)
- Hair color: Blond
- Eye color: Blue-green
- Beauty pageant titleholder
- Title: Miss Teen Hungary 1989; Miss Alpe Adria 1990
- Major competitions: Miss Alpe Adria 1990 (winner); Queen of Hungary 1990 (2nd place); Miss Teen Hungary 1989 (winner); The Look of the Year 1988 (contestant); Beauty pageant Hungary 1987 (3rd place); Fotomodella dell'anno 1986 (top 3)

Éva Henger (born 2 November 1972) is an Italian-Hungarian actress, television personality, singer, model, internet personality, and former pornographic actress.

== Biography ==
=== Career ===
==== Early life and beginnings ====
She is daughter of a conservatory director and songwriter (her father also composed for her a song entitled) and of a dancer of classical ballet and liscio. Éva Henger began her modeling career at 14 when her mother sent some of her photos to a beauty contest, "Fotomodella dell'anno", where she ranked in the top three, after which she was the TV face in TV commercials for a chain of shopping centers.

In the 1980s, she also played handball for the team that won the championship. At 15 she ranked third in a beauty contest in Hungary and, further, to make television advertisements, she also being testimonials for magazines, newspapers and periodicals (the firsts where she worked are Kurier and Reforme). At 16 she took part in the beauty pageant "The Look of the Year".

She graduated in Hungary, in particular she attended the Prohászka Ottokár Orsolyita Gimnázium, Általános Iskola és Óvoda in Győr where she studied dance, specializing in classical ballet; in addition to classical studies, Éva studied piano for eight years and also worked as a nurse for two years, furthermore manage a bowling alley for two years. In these years she also began her career as an actress in German television dramas, in particular she takes part in various episodes of Derrick.

==== 1989–1998 ====
At the age of 17 she was elected Miss Teen Hungary 1989. The following year she ranked second place, and she was elected Miss Alpe Adria 1990 in Villach in Austria. She was hired by the Italian-Hungarian agency Blue Angels, of which Riccardo Schicchi was co-founder. The first work with Riccardo Schicchi dates back to the early 1990s: it is a photo shoot without veils for Playmen magazine, then Éva met him as a glamor photographer. She parades all over the world, mainly in European countries, especially in Eastern Europe, in particular Hungary and Austria, but also in Germany, France and Italy.

She moved to Italy and intensified her collaboration with Riccardo Schicchi, who later became her husband, and began performing in the clubs of the Diva Futura agency, of which Riccardo Schicchi was co-founder, and in other lap dance clubs throughout Italy, in various shows Éva uses banknotes, more precisely US dollar banknotes with hes image. She also plays the profession of deejay; Éva also helps her husband in directing and photography also in the hard genre. At the same time, also she made her debut in the hard world under the direction of her husband; her debut is in a film by Rocco Siffredi in 1993.

In the meantime, in the 1990s she paraded for Chiara Boni, Fendi and other brands. In addition to parading, Éva poses for covers all over the world, in particular she does many photo shoots for numerous magazines, especially in Latin America. In South America, more precisely in Peru, she is the protagonist of Cin cin program aired on Peruvian television.

In 1995 she posed for the Penthouse calendar. In 1996 she made his debut in comic films with Fantozzi – Il ritorno directed by Neri Parenti. In 1998 she recorded her first single Ooh Yeah with music video; in the same year she is in the cast of A Song for Eurotrash, directed by Peter Stuart. Also in 1998 she is the protagonist of Le avventure ermetiche di Eva Henger, a comic wanted by Riccardo Schicchi, drawn by Giuseppe Di Bernardo with Jacopo Brandi based on an idea by Marco Bianchini that was published in serial numbers in the magazines of the Diva Futura. In the same year she is the protagonist of Un mostro di nome Lila, directed by Enrico Bernard; from the film is made a calendar 1999. Also in the same year she is the protagonist of Il fantasma directed by Joe D'Amato; it's the remake in an erotic and romantic version of The Phantom of the Opera, a novel by Gaston Leroux. In 1998 she is the protagonist of I sogni proibiti di Lila directed by Enrico Bernard.

Penthouse, Blitz, Le Ore and many others. At the same time she also take part in the traveling exhibition of erotic shows such as the Erotica tour.

==== 1998–2005 ====
Her pornographic filmography includes 18 films: later Éva says that only 4 films were shot and that the others would be made with scenes cut from those four. Éva decides to leave this world; her last film in her filmography is from 2001 directed by her husband Riccardo Schicchi. Instead, she intensifies her career as an actress of other genres, which she already carried out in parallel.

She continues her modeling work by posing for various magazines. Also since 1998 to 2008 Éva starred in 15 sexy calendars produced by Diva Futura, the photographer of many works, including many calendars, was Riccardo Schicchi.

Between 2000 and 2010 she took part in three editions of Ciao Darwin on Canale 5. From 2000 to 2002 she is in the cast of Milano-Roma on Rai 2. From 2000 to 2005 she hosted the radio program Due di notte on Rai Radio 2; in these years Éva also began her work as influencer.

In 2001 she was the protagonist, Regina, of the film Il gioco dei sensi directed by Enrico Bernard; and she played a part in E adesso sesso, film directed by Carlo Vanzina; in this year she took part, in the United Kingdom, in Eurotrash on Channel 4. In 2001, moreover, Éva cooperates with Enrico Bertolino and Natasha Stefanenko in Convenscion on Rai 2, followed by Superconvenscion and the following year Convenscion a colori and Convenscion Express always on Rai 2; in these programs, where she also had the role of pollster, was included the sitcom Zovvo where Éva played Zovvo's wife, played by Tullio Solenghi. Also in 2001 she hosts Eva contro Henger on My-Tv, which in addition to being a television channel was also considered as web TV; and Éva takes part in Stracult on Rai 2 (where she is directed in various short films by directors as Dino Risi or Luciano Emmer) in the role of "Mrs. Fottenberg" working with Max Tortora and Max Giusti, in Stracult; she is also in the cast of the sitcom Max-G Hunter Production. In 2001, she also takes part in Furore on Rai 2; in 2002, she also takes part in Stracult Redux on Rai 2. In the 2001-02 sporting season she was a sponsor of Pallavolo Palermo, a Serie A1 women's volleyball club.

In 2002 Éva was in the cast of Gangs of New York, a film directed by Martin Scorsese; in the film makes her debut, using the surname of her mother, the daughter Mercédesz, with whom Éva will also works on other occasions. In the same year she is also in the cast, in the role of Mrs. Fottenberg, of L'ispettore Derrick… e Harry! directed by David Emmer. Between 2002 and 2003 she took part in Cocktail d'amore on Rai 2. In 2003 he took part in Libero, in Tv Zone, both programs aired on Rai 2; and, for the same channel, Éva took part again in Stracult she is also in the cast of the sitcom Argoss - The Fantastic Superman. Furthermore, in 2003, she is co-star of the docu-fiction La dolce via, a medium-length film directed by Marco Colli.

Between 2004 and 2005 she took part in the television program Cronache marziane on Italia 1. In 2004 she is in the cast of The Jokes directed by Carlo Vanzina and in 2005 she is in the cast of Il ritorno del Monnezza directed by Carlo Vanzina. Also in 2005 she is in the cast of the film Tutti all'attacco directed by Lorenzo Vignolo.

==== 2005–2008 ====
In 2005 she is one of the contestants of the second edition of the reality show La fattoria, hosted by Barbara D'Urso and aired on Canale 5; Éva ranks semifinalist. In addition, in 2005 she hosts, with Gabibbo, the television program Paperissima Sprint on Canale 5, becoming the darling of children. In the same year, moreover, she takes part in Domenica in on Rai 1. Since 2005 she has appeared in music videos of other singers.

In 2006 Éva enters the house of Grande Fratello 6 for a particular weekly test: teach to the students the hungarian language. In the same year she is in the cast of four films: Nemici per la pelle by Rossella Drudi, AD Project by Eros Puglielli, she played the protagonist Lila in La natura di Lila by Enrico Bernard and played the role of Inga in Parentesi tonde by Michele Lunella. Also in 2006 she released her second single My Heart Is Dancing with a music video. In the same year she is one of the protagonists of Una settimana di risate with Max Tortora directed by David Emmer. She also takes part at the "Festival Show 2006", both as a singer and as a dancer, together with her daughter Mercédesz; moreover she is the protagonist of the short film Il gioiello directed by Stefano Calvagna.

From 2006 to 2008 she took part in Saturday Night Live from Milano on Italia 1; she is also in the cast of The Bang, a police sitcom with Enzo Salvi. In 2007 on Italia 1 she hosts with Alessandro Cecchi Paone Azzardo and takes part in Lucignolo. In the same year, with Enzo Salvi she is also in the cast of the sitcom Le avventure di Diabetik. In 2007 Éva recorded her third single Quando te quiero and her fourth Romantica with Mal. In the same year she was awarded the "premio speciale della direzione del Festival" at the 61st Salerno Film Festival.

In 2008 she was in the cast of three films: she played the protagonist Jessica in Torno a vivere da solo directed by Jerry Calà, Lenka in Bastardi directed by Federico Del Zoppo and Andres Alce Meldonado, and Lorena in Guardando le stelle directed by Stefano Calvagna. Moreover, in the same year she takes part in the culinary talent Chef per un giorno and is a speaker at the "Telefilm Festival". Also in 2008 she was in the cast of Cocktail d'amore Zip broadcast on RaiSat Premium.

==== 2008–2016 ====
Since 2008 Éva is a regular columnist for Pomeriggio Cinque and from 2009 to 2012 for Domenica Cinque, then, from 2012 to 2021, she also becomes a regular columnist for Domenica Live; all programs hosted by Barbara D'Urso on Canale 5. Furthermore, from 2009 to 2012 she is the commentator of Mattino Cinque, a program hosted by Federica Panicucci on Canale 5.

In 2009 she recorded her fifth single Lost Love and her first EP Lost Love (containing various versions of Lost Love and the song Circles). In the same year, she also made a calendar in the Maldives while she was pregnant with her third child Jennifer.

In 2010 she returned to Stracult on Rai 2 with the short The performance of the living dead in which she is the protagonist. In 2011 she was the protagonist of the television crime fiction Roma nuda, directed by Giuseppe Ferrara. In the same year she takes part in Top Secret on Rete 4 and recorded, together with Dr. Feelx, her sixth single Parole parole cover of Mina.

In 2011, moreover, Éva appears on the cover of Playboy Italia; for Playboy she had already posed for editions of other countries. In 2012 she poses for a calendar and plays Angelica in the film Fallo per papà directed by Ciro Ceruti and Ciro Villano; she also hosts Hobby a tv program on Vero, and takes part in the docufilm Il Signore del porno-Riccardo Schicchi directed by Alberto D'Onofrio. From 2012 to 2013, for all three editions, she hosted Pescati dalla rete, program tv on Vero. In 2013 she released the seventh single Tum cha cha with a music video. In these years she has acted in various short films collaborating with university students of cinema.

==== 2016–2023 ====
Éva Henger continues her activity as a columnist in the programs Videonews conducted by Barbara D'Urso. In 2016 she is in the cast of Habemus film - Perugia oggi, a film directed by Roberto Goracci and Alessio Ortica, the proceeds from the film go to charity. Between 2017 and 2018 she is a regular columnist of Casa Signorini, a web program on 361tv.

In 2018 she take part in L'isola dei famosi 13, a reality show on Canale 5 hosted by Alessia Marcuzzi.

From 2019 to 2020 she is a commentator of Live - Non è la D'Urso, a program hosted by Barbara D'Urso on Canale 5. In 2019 he records the single with Sciarra Come Adamo ed Eva with two music videos published in 2020.

In 2020, moreover, she is the protagonist of the short film Il postino sogna sempre due volte directed by Rocco Marino, for which she was awarded with "premio esercenti cinematografici" at 19° Villammare Film Festival. In 2022, together with her daughter Mercédesz, she is a judge in Sharm el-Sheikh of the Lollapalooza Got Talent.

In 2023 she takes part, together with her daughter Mercédesz, in the talk show Il salotto delle celebrità - Sanremo 2023''. In the same year is released the single Influencer ("Sfrizzami" edition) by Sara Tommasi feat. Éva Henger and Francesca Cipriani.

==== 2023–present ====
Éva Henger continues her activity as a columnist in the programs Videonews conducted by Barbara D'Urso. In 2023 she leads the beauty contest Miss Woman Beauty Contest - World Edition and is the protagonist of the film Tic toc directed by Davide Scovazzo.

=== Private life ===
From 1990s Éva is romantically linked with Riccardo Schicchi. The first daughter of Éva is Mercédesz was born on 18 August 1991 in Győr from a previous relationship. Declared as Mercedesz Jelinek Schicchi (Jelinek is the surname of the biological father), Riccardo wants the daughter to be recognized as his in all respects, keeping the secret of biological paternity; in 2019 Mercédesz makes the topic public, underlining that for her the only father is in any case Riccardo. Éva married Riccardo Schicchi in Rome on 19 January 19, 1994; the couple has a son: Riccardo Jr. was born on 22 December 1994 in Rome.

On 9 December 2012 in Rome dies Riccardo Schicchi; despite their living separated for many years, Éva and Riccardo never divorced. After the death of Riccardo Schicchi, the property of Schicchi of Diva Futura, moreover, becomes property of Éva, Mercédesz and Riccardo Jr.

Éva Henger is romantically linked from 2004 with Massimiliano Caroletti and with him had a daughter: Jennifer Caroletti born on 12 April 2009 in Rome. Éva Henger and Massimiliano Caroletti often work together and in 2007 they founded "Anteprima Eventi Production e Management". The couple married on 14 April 2013 in Rome. On 13 March 2019 the couple remarried in the Maldives.

Since 2005 Éva has supported the National League for the Defense of Dogs (LNDC); she has always been a supporter of animal rights, in the 1990s she undressed in front of Palazzo Montecitorio in defense of abused dogs.

Éva Henger was portrayed by Tesa Litvan in the 2024 Italian film Diva Futura.

== Filmography ==
=== Mainstream films ===
- Fantozzi - Il ritorno, directed by Neri Parenti (1996)
- Il fantasma, directed by Joe D'Amato (1998)
- Un mostro di nome Lila, directed by Enrico Bernard (1998)
- I sogni proibiti di Lila, directed by Enrico Bernard (1999)
- Il giuoco dei sensi, directed by Enrico Bernard (2001)
- E adesso sesso, directed by Carlo Vanzina (2001)
- Gangs of New York, directed by Martin Scorsese (2002)
- The Jokes, directed by Carlo Vanzina (2004)
- Tutti all'attacco, directed by Lorenzo Vignolo (2005)
- Il ritorno del Monnezza, directed by Carlo Vanzina (2004)
- Parentesi tonde, directed by Michele Lunella (2006)
- La natura di Lila, directed by Enrico Bernard (2006)
- Nemici per la pelle, directed by Rossella Drudi (2006)
- AD Project, directed by Eros Puglielli (2006)
- Una settimana di risate, directed by David Emmer (2006)
- Bastardi, directed by Federico Del Zoppo and Andres Alce Meldonado (2008)
- Torno a vivere da solo, directed by Jerry Calà (2008)
- Guardando le stelle, directed by Stefano Calvagna (2008)
- Fallo per papà, directed by Ciro Ceruti and Ciro Villano (2012)
- Habemus film - Perugia oggi, directed by Roberto Goracci and Alessio Ortica (2016) - charity film
- Tic toc directed by Davide Scovazzo (2023)

==== Television ====
- German television dramas (1980s)
- Derrick (1990)
- A Song for Eurotrash, directed by Peter Stuart (1998)
- Max-G Hunter Production (2001) - sit-com of Stracult (Rai 2)
- Zovvo (2002) – sitcom
- Argoss - Il fantastico Superman (2003) - sit-com of Stracult (Rai 2)
- Le avventure di Diabetik, directed by Andres Alce Meldonado (2007)
- The Bang (2006-2008) - sit-com of Saturday Night Live from Milano (Italia 1)
- La performance dei morti viventi (2010) - short film
- Il signore del porno - Riccardo Schicchi, directed by Alberto D'Onofrio (2012) - docufilm

==== Medium-length film ====
- L'ispettore Derrick... e Harry!, regia di David Emmer (2002)
- La dolce via, directed by Marco Colli (2003)

==== Short film ====
- Il gioiello, directed by Stefano Calvagna (2006)
- Il postino sogna sempre due volte, directed by Rocco Marino (2020)

=== Pornographic films ===
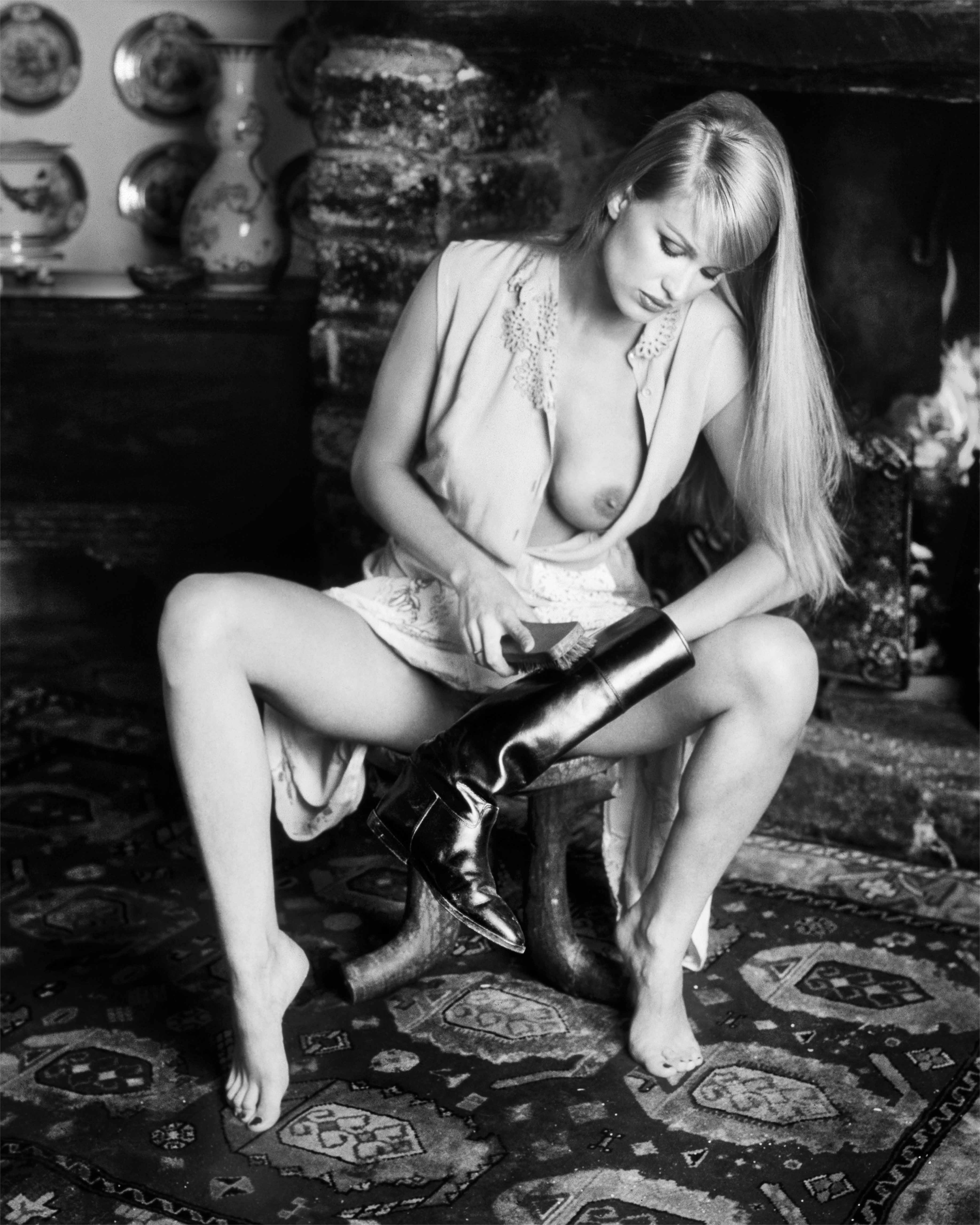
Éva Henger

- Rocco e le storie vere, directed by Rocco Siffredi (1993)
- Rocco e le storie vere - Parte 2, directed by Rocco Siffredi (1993)
- Il mistero del convento, directed by Mario Salieri (1993)
- Finalmente pornostar (la conchiglia violata), directed by Riccardo Schicchi (1997)
- L'angelo dell'inferno - Il vizio del peccato, directed by Joe D'Amato (1997)
- Peccati di gola, directed by Joe D'Amato (1997)
- Le pornololite di Diva Futura 5, directed by Riccardo Schicchi (1997)
- Eva più che mai!!!, directed by Antonio Adamo and Riccardo Schicchi (1998)
- Capricci anali, directed by Joe D'Amato (1998)
- Showgirl, directed by Joe D'Amato (1998)
- Il fantasma, directed by Joe D'Amato (1998)
- Experiences - Il culo violato, directed by Joe D'Amato (1998)
- Experiences - Il culo violato: Seconda parte, directed by Joe D'Amato (1999)
- Private XXX 5, directed by Peter Backman, John Millerman and Frank Thring (1999)
- Eva per tutti! (il sogno diventa realtà), directed by Riccardo Schicchi (1999)
- A letto con Eva - Esordienti in azione, directed by Riccardo Schicchi (1999)
- Eva contro Eva, directed by Riccardo Schicchi (2001)
- Scacco alla regina, directed by Riccardo Schicchi (2001)

==== Documentary ====
- Camerini ardenti, directed by Pietro Balla and Monica Repetto (1996)

== Television ==
- Cin cin (TV Perú, 1990)
- Ciao Darwin 3 (Canale 5, 2000)
- Milano-Roma (Rai 2, 2000–2002)
- Eurotrash (Channel 4, 2001)
- Eva contro Henger (My-Tv, 2001)
- Max-G Hunter Production (Rai 2, 2001)
- Stracult (Rai 2, 2001, 2003)
- Furore (Rai 2, 2001)
- Convenscion (Rai 2, 2001)
- Superconvenscion (Rai 2, 2001)
- Convenscion a colori (Rai 2, 2002)
- Convenscion Express (Rai 2, 2002)
- Libero (Rai 2, 2003)
- Tv Zone (Rai 2, 2003)
- Argoss - Il fantastico Superman (Rai 2, 2003)
- Cocktail d'amore (Rai 2, 2002–2003)
- La Fattoria (season 2) (Canale 5, 2005)
- Paperissima Sprint (Canale 5, 2005)
- Domenica in (Rai 1, 2005)
- Grande Fratello 6 (Canale 5, 2006)
- Saturday Night Live from Milano (Italia 1, 2006–2008)
- The Bang (Italia 1, 2006–2008)
- Azzardo (Italia 1, 2007)
- Lucignolo (Italia 1, 2007)
- Ciao Darwin 5 - L'anello mancante (Canale 5, 2007)
- Chef per un giorno (La7/LA7d/Discovery Real Time, 2008)
- Cocktail d'amore Zip (RaiSat Premium, 2008)
- Pomeriggio Cinque (Canale 5, 2008–present)
- Mattino Cinque (Canale 5, 2009–2011)
- Domenica Cinque (Canale 5, 2009–2012)
- Ciao Darwin 6 - La regressione (Canale 5, 2010)
- Top Secret (Rete 4, 2011)
- Pescati dalla rete (Vero TV, 2012–2013)
- Domenica Live (Canale 5, 2012–present)
- Le iene (Italia 1, 2017–2018)
- L'isola dei famosi 13 (Canale 5, 2018)
- Live - Non è la D'Urso (Canale 5, 2019–present)

=== Web TV ===
- Eva contro Henger (My-Tv, 2001)
- Vip Champion 2017 (361tv, 2017)
- Casa Signorini (361tv, 2017–2018)
- Vip Champion 2018 (361tv, 2018)
- Il salotto delle celebrità - Sanremo 2023 (Instagram/Facebook, 2023)

== Discography ==
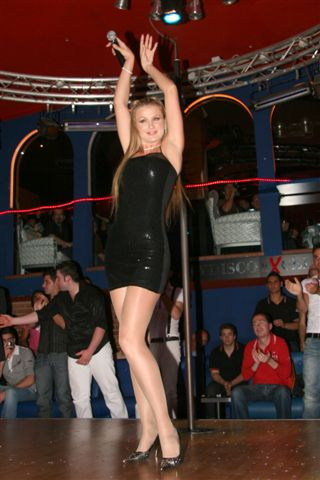
Éva Henger in 2008

=== EPs ===
- 2009 – Lost Love

=== Singles ===
- 1998 – Ooh Yeah
- 2006 – My Heart Is Dancing
- 2007 – Quando te quiero
- 2007 – Romantica with Mal
- 2009 – Lost Love
- 2011 – Parole parole with Dr. Feelx
- 2013 – Tum cha cha
- 2019 – Come Adamo ed Eva with Sciarra
- 2023 – Influencer ("Sfrizzami" edition) by Sara Tommasi feat. Éva Henger and Francesca Cipriani

=== Music videos ===
- 2006 – My Heart Is Dancing
- 2013 – Tum cha cha
- 2020 – Come Adamo ed Eva with Sciarra
- 2020 – Come Adamo ed Eva: Live Milano – The Club/Fidelio with Sciarra (in this music video there is Barbara D'Urso)

Music videos by other artists with Éva Henger

- 2005 – Alterego by Nearco (directed by Jury Rossetti)
- 2006 – Mal di stomaco by Fabri Fibra (directed by Cosimo Alemà)
- 2011 – Closer by Ekow Wonder feat. Snoop Dogg & Kylian Mash (directed by Claudio Zagarini and Marco Pavone)
- 2011 – U R A Million $ Girl di Dwaine feat. Diddy, Keri Hilson & Trina (directed by Gil Green e Claudio Zagarini)
- 2012 – (Avalanche) Rescue Me from the Dancefloor by M.iam.i & Flo Rida (directed by Claudio Zagarini, Gianluca Catania and Samuele Dalò)
- 2019 – Buona primavera by Pàmela feat. Trash Italiano & Elenoire Ferruzzi (directed by Arianna Mereu, Marco D'Annolfi and Andrea Papazzoni)
- 2022 – Callo puttano by Rambo Smash feat. Stylo aka Space

=== Collaborations ===
- 2007 – Romantica with Mal
- 2011 – Parole parole with Dr. Feelx
- 2019 – Come Adamo ed Eva with Sciarra

=== Soundtrack ===
- 1998 – A Song for Eurotrash di Peter Stuart con Ooh Yeah

== Radio ==
- Due di notte (Rai Radio 2, 2000–2005)

== Awards ==
=== Beauty pageants ===
- Miss Alpe Adria 1990 (winner)
- Queen of Hungary 1990 (2nd place)
- Miss Teen Hungary 1989 (winner)
- The Look of the Year 1988 (contestant)
- Beauty pageant Hungary 1987 (3rd place)
- Fotomodella dell'anno 1986 (top 3)

=== Sports ===
Golf

- 2007 – Celebrity Golf Cup (winner with Massimiliano Caroletti) – Italy

Tennis

- 2017 – Vip Champion (winner with Massimiliano Caroletti) – Types: singles and doubles – Italy
