= Mediaset Italia =

- Country: Italy
- Broadcast area: Worldwide, except Italy
- Headquarters: Rome, Italy

Programming
- Language: Italian
- Picture format: 576i (16:9 SDTV)

Ownership
- Owner: Mediaset
- Sister channels: Canale 5, Italia 1, Rete 4

History
- Launched: 2009; 17 years ago

Links
- Website: mediasetitalia.com

Availability

Streaming media
- Ziggo GO (Netherlands): ZiggoGO.tv (Europe only)

Mediaset Italia is an international linguistic and cultural television channel, part of the Italian media company Mediaset. Launched in 2009 with the aim to reach Italian communities worldwide, the channel is the international service of Mediaset and broadcast entertainment programming from Canale 5, Italia 1 and Rete 4.

On June 15, 2011, Mediaset Italia officially launched in the United States, available via Dish Network and Comcast. Since September 20, 2017 the channel was also available via DirecTV.

== Programming ==
=== TV series and soap operas ===
- Amore pensaci tu
- Centovetrine
- Dottor Clown
- Fuoco amico TF45 - Eroe per amore
- Furore - Il vento della speranza
- I piccoli maestri
- Il bello delle donne - alcuni anni dopo
- L'onore e il rispetto
- La regina di Palermo
- Le tre rose di Eva
- R.I.S Roma
- Rimbocchiamoci le maniche
- Romanzo siciliano
- Solo
- Squadra Antimafia
- Tutti insieme all'improvviso
- Un cane per due
- Un dottore quasi perfetto
- Vivere

=== News and infotainment ===
- Stasera Italia
- Striscia la notizia
- Battiti Live
- Matrix
- Quarto grado
- Quarta Repubblica
- Dritto e Rovescio
- Freedom - Oltre il confine
- CR4 - La repubblica delle donne
- Segreti e delitti
- Studio Aperto
- Terra!
- TG5
- TG4

=== Entertainment ===
- Amici
- Avanti un altro!
- Big Show
- Caduta libera
- Colorado
- Ciao Darwin
- Chi ha incastrato Peter Pan?
- C'è posta per te
- Cotto e mangiato
- Domenica Cinque
- Forum
- Grande Fratello
- Le Iene Show
- Lo sportello di Forum
- Live - Non è la D'Urso
- L'isola dei famosi
- Mattino Cinque
- Melaverde
- Pomeriggio Cinque
- Ricette di famiglia
- Ti racconto un libro
- Temptation Island
- The Call Trasformat
- Uomini e Donne
- Verissimo
- Vite straordinarie
- Zelig
- I viaggi del cuore

== See also ==
- Rai Italia
