= Francesca Cipriani =

Italian television host

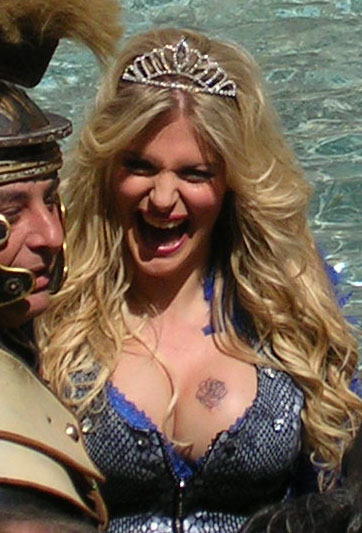
- Cipriani at a protest against Endemol in 2009
- Born: Francesca Cipriani D'Altorio; July 3, 1984 (age 42); Popoli, Italy
- Occupation: Television personality
- Spouse: Alessandro Rossi (m. 2022)

Francesca Cipriani D'Altorio (born July 3, 1984) is an Italian television host and celebrity.

== Biography ==
Cipriani grew up in Sulmona, her debut in Italian television dates back to 2005, when she worked as an anchorwoman and correspondent for Onda TV, a local TV station of Valle Peligna.

In 2006 she gained notoriety by participating as a contestant in the sixth edition of the reality show Grande Fratello. Between 2006 and 2007 she was a host of the weekly column Show television on Sky, she also took part in several satirical programs aired on Sky Show and Comedy Central. In 2008 she was co-host of Qui studio a voi stadio, a sports program by the broadcaster Telelombardia, she then took part in the TV movie by Canale 5 Finalmente a casa, in the sitcom by Rai 2 Piloti and in the sitcom by Italia 1 Medici miei.

In the fall of 2009 she took part as a correspondent in the program by Canale 5 Domenica Cinque hosted by Barbara D'Urso. In the spring of 2010, shortly after making her debut in cinema with the film Un neomelodico presidente, Cipriani won paired with Federico Bianco the reality show by Italy 1 La pupa e il secchione - Il ritorno. In autumn of 2010 she then took part, along with other competitors of the aforementioned reality show, in the comedy program Colorado by the same issuer.

In the first half of 2011 Cipriani joined Enrico Papi as a host of the game show Trasformat; in December of the same year she moved to Canale 5 and participated as correspondent, assisted by Marco Ceriani, in the program Kalispéra! by Alfonso Signorini On the same channel, in 2014 she worked as among the senders of Mattino Cinque, between 2015 and 2016 she was hosted among the regular guests of Piero Chiambretti's Grand Hotel Chiambretti. In the 2017–2018 television season, Cipriani took part in the cast of Colorado, this time as a comic sidekick; in 2018 she participated as one of the contestants of the thirteenth edition of the reality show L'isola dei famosi, on Canale 5, where she finishes in fourth place overall. Since 2020 she is part of the cast of La pupa e il secchione e viceversa, alongside the conductors Paolo Ruffini in the third edition and Andrea Pucci in the fourth edition. In 2021 she participated as a contestant in the reality show Grande Fratello VIP on Canale 5.

Cipriani has made three nude calendars, the first in 2007 for Show Television, the second in 2010 for the Italia 1 program Mitici '80 and the third in 2015 for Eva Tremila magazine.

== Filmography ==
- Finalmente a casa, directed by Gianfrancesco Lazotti – TV movie (2008)
- Piloti – TV series (2008)
- Medici miei – TV series (2008)
- Un neomelodico presidente, directed by Alfonso Ciccarelli (2010)
- Fratelli Benvenuti – TV series (2010)

== TV Series ==
- Grande Fratello (2006)
- Show television (2006–2007)
- Tg Show (2007)
- Quasi TG (2007)
- Qui studio a voi stadio (2008)
- Domenica Cinque (2009)
- La pupa e il secchione - Il ritorno (2010)
- Colorado (2010–2019)
- Trasformat (2011)
- Kalispéra! (2011)
- Mattino Cinque (2014)
- Pomeriggio Cinque (2014–present)
- Grand Hotel Chiambretti (2015–2016)
- Domenica Live (2017–2021)
- L'isola dei famosi (2018–2019)
- La pupa e il secchione e viceversa (2020–present)
- Grande Fratello VIP (2021)

== Videoclips ==
- Il bagnino Gino, by Marco Milano (2013)
- Milonga nueva, by Alex Di Maggio feat. Francesca Cipriani (2015)
- Ncopp'a na stella, by Antonio Ambrosino (2015)
- Spaghetti a colazione, by Dr. Lemme (2017)

== Discography ==
=== Singles ===
- Milonga nueva (Alex Di Maggio feat. Francesca Cipriani)
