= Mercédesz Henger =

Italian-Hungarian television personality, influencer and model

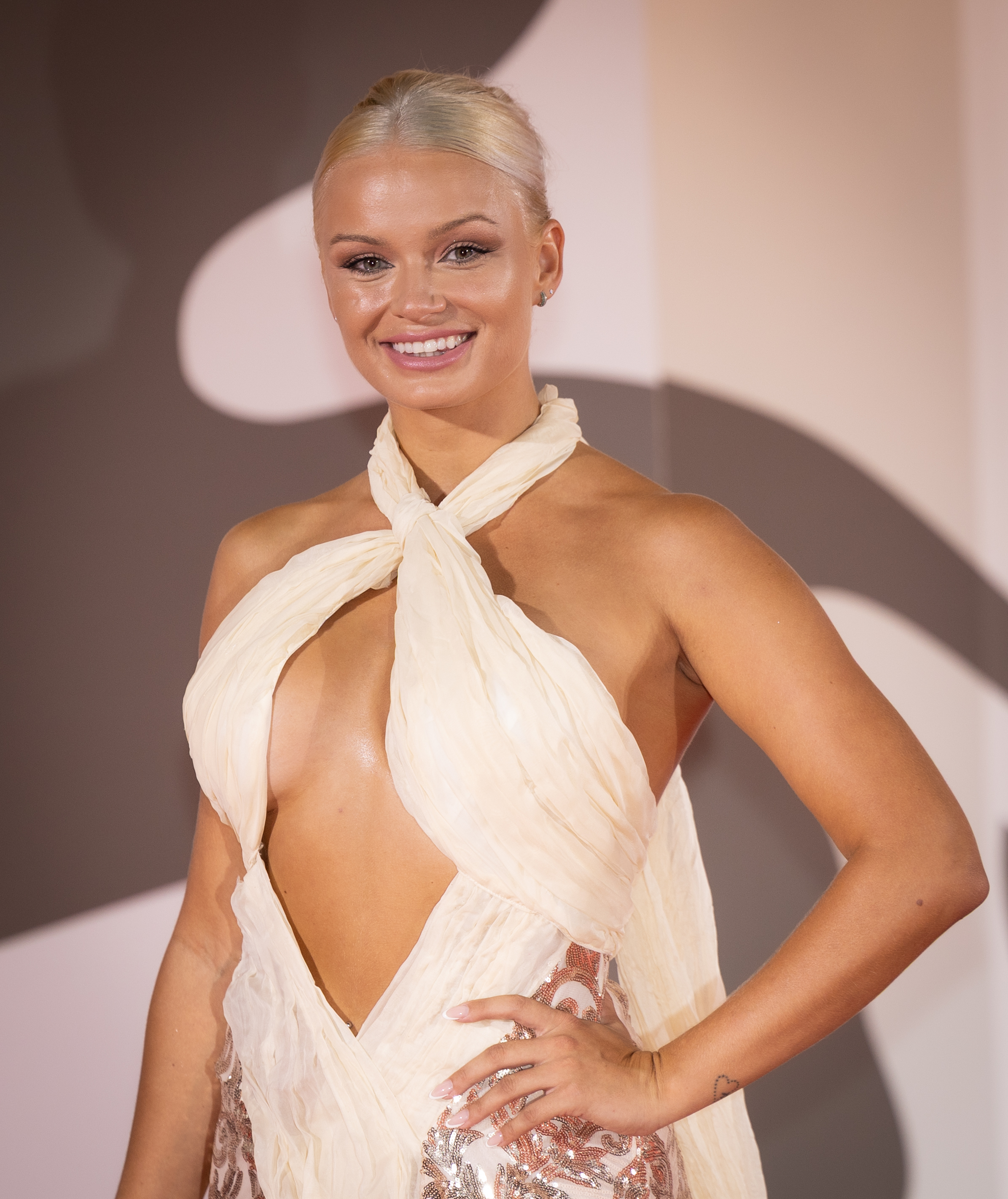
- Henger at the 2024 Venice Film Festival
- Born: Mercédesz Jelinek Schicchi; 18 August 1991 (age 35); Győr, Hungary
- Education: University of Southampton; University of Oxford; St. George's British International School; Marymount International School of Rome
- Occupations: Actress; television personality; influencer; model
- Years active: 2002–present
- Parents: Riccardo Schicchi (father); Éva Henger (mother)
- Relatives: Riccardo Schicchi Jr. (brother); Jennifer Caroletti (maternal half-sister); Massimiliano Caroletti (stepfather)
- Musical career
- Genre: EDM
- Instrument: Vocals
- Modeling information
- Height: 180 cm (5 ft 11 in)
- Hair color: Blond
- Eye color: Blue-green
- Beauty pageant titleholder
- Title: Miss Volto 2006
- Major competitions: Miss Volto 2006 (winner); The Look of the Year 2006 (2nd place)

Mercédesz Henger (born Mercédesz Jelinek Schicchi; 18 August 1991) is an Italian-Hungarian actress, television personality, influencer and model; she is daughter of Éva Henger and Riccardo Schicchi and she is known with the surname of Éva Henger, her mother, as Mercédesz Henger since 2002, when she made her cinema debut in 2002 with a cameo role in the movie Gangs of New York directed by Martin Scorsese; her mother also appears in the film.

== Biography ==
=== Career ===
==== Early life and beginnings ====
Mercédesz Henger, birth name Mercédesz Jelinek Schicchi (Jelinek is the surname of biological father and Schicchi is the surname of Riccardo Schicchi), is daughter of Éva Henger and Riccardo Schicchi. She studied at Marymount International School of Rome and at St. George's British International School in Rome; she then continued her studies in United Kingdom, where she attended courses at the University of Oxford, and then graduated in psychology at the University of Southampton.

She is known with the surname of Éva Henger, her mother; as Mercédesz Henger since 2002, when she made her cinema debut in 2002 with a cameo role in the movie Gangs of New York directed by Martin Scorsese; film where there is also the mother Éva Henger.

==== 2003–2015 ====
In 2003 she posed for a photo shoot for a magazine for teenagers. In 2005 she is, with her mother, in the music video of My Heart Is Dancing, single of her mother. In the 2006 she take part at The Look of the Year where she ranks second and won the title of "Miss Volto". Mercédesz started modeling for "Roma Sposa" and Alviero Martini. In the same year, as dancer, she is in the cast of "Festival Show" with her mother.

In 2008 she played the role of Orsola Iuvara, one of the protagonists, in the film Bastardi directed by Federico Del Zoppo and Andres Alce Meldonado; film where there is also the mother Éva Henger. In the same year Mercédesz Henger won the "Piper Club Award" with her mother Éva Henger.

In 2009 she played the role of Chiara in the film Torno a vivere da solo directed by Jerry Calà, film where there is also the mother Éva Henger; in the same year posed for her first calendar for teenagers.

In 2015 she is the protagonist of the music video We Gon Ride by B-Goss feat. Flo Rida, T-Pain e J-Rand.

==== 2016–2020 ====
In 2016, she is the third finalist of L'isola dei famosi 11, a reality show on Canale 5 hosted by Alessia Marcuzzi from the studio and Alvin from the island; in the same year she is in the cast of Grand Hotel Chiambretti on Canale 5, she is in the cast of the music video Estate 2016 by Paolo Vallesi and in the cast of Bring the Noise on Italia 1.

Since 2016 Mercédesz is a pundit in the programs Domenica Live (closed in 2021) and Pomeriggio Cinque (until 2023), both on Canale 5 and hosted by Barbara D'Urso, many times with her mother Éva Henger. Moreover in 2016 she is a basketball player in BasketArtisti, a basketball team.

In 2017 she is the testimonial of S.S. Lazio Women, an Italian women's football team.

In 2017 and in 2018 she is a pundit in the program Casa Signorini on 361tv, many times with her mother Éva Henger; and in 2018 Mercédesz is in the cast of Vip Champion 2018 on 361tv, where there is also her mother.

External videos
- Boomerang by Btsound Vs Mercedesz Henger on YouTube

In 2017 and in 2019 she takes part in the cast of Le Iene on Italia 1, in 2017 with her mother Éva Henger. In 2018 she is in the cast of the music video E contro tutto by Dorian. In the same year she debuts as a singer collaborating with Btsound; the single is Boomerang and there is also a music video; in this music video there is also her sister Jennifer. In 2018 she is in the cast of the music video Portami via da me by Marco Santilli.

Since 2018 signs a line of lipsticks for MU – Make Up. From 2019 to 2020 she is a pundit in the programs Live – Non è la D'Urso on Canale 5 and hosted by Barbara D'Urso.

In 2019 she is in the cast of the music video Traguardo by VEMO, she is co-host for Miss Europe Continental (backstage), and she is in the cast of music video Chica linda by Prynce Niko.

==== 2020–2023 ====
Mercédesz Henger continues her activity as a columnist in the programs Videonews conducted by Barbara D'Urso. In 2020 she is the protagonist of the music video Playlist by Daniele Ronda. In 2021 she is the protagonist of the short film Biphora directed by Wylliam Fumagalli.

In 2022 and in 2023 she is in the cast of Sartù, il sorriso è servito. In the same year she is the fourth finalist of L'isola dei famosi 16, a reality show on Canale 5 hosted by Ilary Blasi from the studio and Alvin from the island.

In the same year she is the protagonist of the music video Lividi by Soniko; and, together with her mother Éva, she is a judge in Sharm el-Sheikh of the Lollapalooza Got Talent. In the same year Mercédesz is in the cast of the music video Svalutation (cover of Adriano Celentano) by Jean-Christophe Moroni.

External videos
- Il girone della giostra by Ilenya and Mercedesz Henger on YouTube

In 2023 she takes part in the cast of Le Iene on Italia 1 and she released the single, with music video, Il girone della giostra, a duet with Ilenya.

In 2023 she takes part, together with her mother Éva, in the talk show Il salotto delle celebrità - Sanremo 2023''; and she takes part, as singer, in the beauty contest Miss Woman Beauty Contest - World Edition hosted by her mother Éva, and she is the protagonist of the music video Tu malavita, io criminale by Marco Calone.

In the same year she is in the cast of Tic toc directed by Davide Scovazzo, film where there are also her mother Éva Henger and her sister Jennifer; she is also in the cast of Elohim directed by Paolo Vegliò.

==== 2024–present ====
In 2024 she played a lead role in Il passo del vento directed by Massimo Paolucci and in The Contract directed by Massimo Paolucci with screenplay of her mother Éva Henger.

=== Personal life ===
Mercédesz is the first daughter of Éva Henger and she was born on 18 August 1991 in Győr from a previous relationship. Declared as Mercedesz Jelinek Schicchi (Jelinek is the surname of the biological father), Riccardo wants the daughter to be recognized as his in all respects, keeping the secret of biological paternity; in 2019 Mercédesz makes the topic public, underlining that for her the only father is in any case Riccardo.

Mercédesz has one brother (Riccardo Jr. Schicchi was born on 22 December 1994 in Rome, son of Éva Henger and Riccardo Schicchi) and one sister (Jennifer Caroletti was born on 12 April 2009 in Rome, daughter of Éva Henger and Massimiliano Caroletti).

After the death of Riccardo Schicchi (9 December 2012 in Rome), the property of Schicchi of Diva Futura, moreover, becomes property of Éva, Mercédesz and Riccardo Jr.

== Television ==
- L'isola dei famosi (season 11) (Canale 5, 2016)
- Grand Hotel Chiambretti (Canale 5, 2016)
- Bring the Noise (Italia 1, 2016)
- Domenica Live (Canale 5, 2016–2021)
- Pomeriggio Cinque (Canale 5, 2016–2023)
- Casa Signorini (361tv, 2017–2018)
- Le Iene (Italia 1, 2017, 2019, 2023)
- Vip Champion 2018 (361tv, 2018)
- Live – Non è la D'Urso (Canale 5, 2019–2020)
- L'isola dei famosi (season 16) (Canale 5, 2022)

== Filmography ==
- Gangs of New York, directed by Martin Scorsese (2002)
- Bastardi, directed by Federico Del Zoppo and Andres Alce Meldonado (2008)
- Torno a vivere da solo, directed by Jerry Calà (2009)
- Biphora, directed by Wylliam Fumagalli (2021) – short film
- Tic toc, directed by Davide Scovazzo (2023)
- Elohim, directed by Paolo Vegliò (2023)
- Il passo del vento by Massimo Paolucci (2024)
- The Contract by Massimo Paolucci (2024)
- Dettami che scrivo by Massimo Paolucci

== Web TV ==
- Sartù, il sorriso è servito (2022–2023)
- Il salotto delle celebrità – Sanremo 2023 (Instagram/Facebook, 2023)

== Singles ==
- 2018 – "Boomerang" by Btsound vs Mercedesz Henger
- 2023 – "Il girone della giostra" by Mercedesz Henger and Ilenya

== Music videos ==
- 2006 – "My Heart Is Dancing" by Éva Henger
- 2015 – "We Gon Ride" by B-Goss feat. Flo Rida, T-Pain and J-Rand
- 2016 – "Estate 2016" by Paolo Vallesi
- 2018 – "E contro tutto" by Dorian
- 2018 – "Boomerang" by Btsound Vs Mercedesz Henger
- 2018 – "Portami via da me" by Marco Santilli
- 2019 – "Traguardo" by VEMO
- 2019 – "Chica linda" by Prynce Niko
- 2020 – "Playlist" by Daniele Ronda
- 2022 – "Lividi" by Soniko
- 2022 – "Svalutation" by Jean-Christophe Moroni
- 2023 – "Il girone della giostra" by Mercedesz Henger and Ilenya
- 2023 – "Tu malavita, io criminale" by Marco Calone
