= Myrta Merlino =

Italian journalist, television presenter and television writer (born 1969)

- Merlino in 2026
- Born: Myrta Merlino; 3 May 1969 (age 57); Naples, Campania, Italy
- Occupations: Journalist, television presenter and television writer

Myrta Merlino (born 3 May 1969) is an Italian journalist, television writer and presenter.

After working at the Council of Ministers of the European Economic Community, since 1995 she has been a member of the Order of Italian Journalists, working both in various Italian newspapers, including Il Mattino, Il Messaggero, Il Sole 24 Ore, and international ones such as International Herald Tribune and Libération.

During her career she has also written eight books, taking a stand for women's rights, the rights of the LGBTQ community in Italy, freedom of the press and becoming a UNICEF ambassador.

== Biography ==
Daughter of the French scholar Giuseppe Merlino and the sinologist and director of the Italian Cultural Institute in Beijing Annamaria Palermo, she graduated from high school.

Although there is no information on the university she attended, various online biographies report that Merlino graduated with honors in political science with a thesis in international law on the Community Charter of Fundamental Rights of Workers. As her first profession, she was hired at the Directorate-General for the Internal Market in the Financial Services area for the Council of Ministers of the European Economic Community.

Her journalistic career began with a collaboration with the economics page of the newspaper Il Mattino, entering the Order of Italian journalists in 1995. At the same time, she continued her profession within the RAI television schedules, initially dealing with some investigations for the program Mixer, on Rai 2, continuing on Rai 3 by creating the program Italia Maastricht together with Giovanni Minoli and Alan Friedman in 1995. Subsequently, she wrote the programs Energia and Mister Euro, the latter also as co-host, becoming the economic manager of Rai 3. In 1997, she edited and hosted ten episodes of the column on the history of the twentieth century, the sign of the command of the program La Storia siamo noi.

Between 2002 and 2003, she was responsible for information for Rai Educational, and the following year she was a regular guest on the program Casa Raiuno, as an economic expert. Between 2005 and 2008, she was the author and host of the information program Economix, produced by Rai Educational.

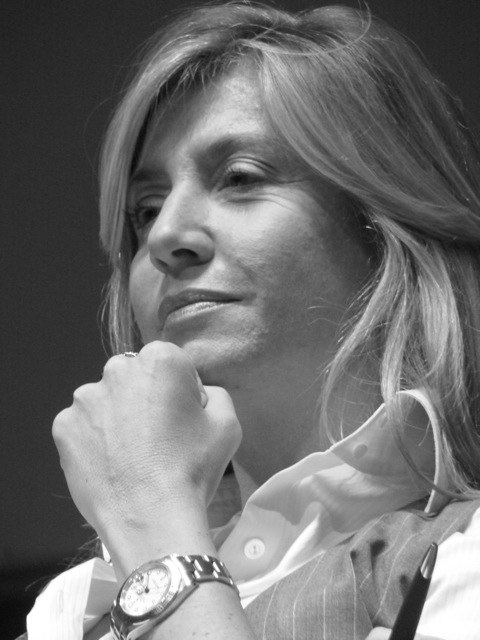
Myrta Merlino in 2011

In 2009 she arrived at La7, as author and host of Effetto domino, an economic analysis broadcast in the late evening until 2011. Since 2011 she has been the creator, author and host, again on La7, of the program L'aria che tira. In the summer of 2014 Merlino debuted in L'aria che tira stasera, four episodes broadcast on Mondays in prime time. In 2015 she published with Rizzoli Madri. Perché saranno loro a cambiare il Paese. Since November 15, 2020 she has hosted another spin-off of her program entitled L'aria di domenica. In 2023 she left La7 and moved to Mediaset, where she was chosen as host of Pomeriggio Cinque, replacing Barbara D'Urso.

She has also worked for a long time for the radio, hosting, within the Rai Radio 2 program Alle otto della sera, a series of episodes on the history of money and then, again for Rai Radio 2, a series of twenty episodes dedicated to the biographies of the men who changed history through money, entitled Re di Denari. She has written for Il Sole 24 Ore, Il Messaggero, Panorama, International Herald Tribune, Libération, Families in Business, Nord e Sud, Il Secolo XIX, Il Resto del Carlino, La Gazzetta del Mezzogiorno. She was the author of a dictionary of community terms, distributed in 250,000 copies with the newspapers Il Mattino and La Gazzetta del Mezzogiorno. Moderator of numerous conferences and public meetings, over the years she has interviewed the main international players in political and economic life.

== Personal life ==
She had two twin sons, Pietro and Giulio Tucci, in 1997 from a relationship that began at the age of twenty-four. From the early 2000s until 2016 she was linked to the former CEO of Invitalia Domenico Arcuri, with whom she had a daughter, Caterina, born in 2001. Since 2016 she has been in a relationship with the former coach and former footballer of Juventus and the national team Marco Tardelli.

== Television programs ==
Year	Title	Network	Role
1994	Mixer	Rai 2	Sent
1997	La storia siamo noi	RaiSat 3	Conductor
2002–2004	Casa Raiuno	Rai 1	Regular guest
2005–2009	Economix	Rai Edu 1	Conductor
2010–2011	Effetto domino	La7	Conductor
2011–2023	L'aria che tira	La7	Conductor
2014–2023	L'aria che tira stasera	La7	Conductor
2020	L'aria di domenica	La7	Conductor
2023–2025	Pomeriggio Cinque	Canale 5	Conductor

=== Television writer ===
Year	Title	Network	Notes
1995–2001	Italia Maastricht	Rai 3	Author
1997	La storia siamo noi	RaiSat 3	Editor of the column l sign of command
	Energia		Author
	Mister Euro		Author
2011–2023	L'aria che tira	La7	Author
2014–2023	L'aria che tira stasera	La7	Author
2020	L'aria di domenica	La7	Author
2023–2025	Pomeriggio Cinque	Canale 5	Author

== Radio ==
Year	Title	Network	Notes
2001, 2004–2005	Alle 8 della sera	Rai Radio 2	Conductor

== Works ==
- La moneta, Sperling & Kupfer editore, 2003
- Gli Affari nostri, Sperling & Kupfer, 2006
- L'aria che tira, Sperling & Kupfer, 2012
- Madri. Perché saranno loro a cambiare il nostro Paese, Rizzoli, 2015
- Donne che sfidano la tempesta, Solferino, 2021

== Awards and nominations ==
Year	Award	Results	Notes
2014	Sulmona Journalism Award	Won	
2016	Simply Woman Award for Information	Won	
2019	Matilde Serao Journalism Award	Won	
2020	Pratola National Award for Television Journalism	Won	
2021	Biagio Agnes Award for Television	Won	
2022	Pio Alferano Award	Won	
