= Ines Trocchia =

Italian fashion model and actress

Ines Trocchia (born December 22, 1994) is an Italian fashion model, actress, and television personality. She has appeared in international fashion and lifestyle magazines.

== Early life ==
Trocchia was born in Nola and raised in Sperone, a municipality in the province of Avellino within the Campania region of Italy. After completing a high school diploma, she began her modeling career locally in Naples. At the age of 19, she reportedly relocated to Milan to pursue fashion modeling full-time.

== Career ==
=== Modeling ===
Trocchia started her modeling career with clothing and lifestyle brands such as Zuiki, Alcott, and Chateau d'Ax, later becoming a spokesmodel for the hair care brand Cotril in 2016. Trocchia's print media career gained international recognition with features in the Italian editions of GQ and Maxim in 2014. She subsequently appeared in editorials and cover shoots for international publications, including For Him Magazine (FHM), Sports Illustrated, GQ Mexico, and multiple international editions of Playboy. In December 2023, FHM France named her the "Breakout Supermodel of the Year". Trocchia has also worked with luxury fashion houses, participating in campaigns and collaborative editorials for brands such as Roberto Cavalli and Dolce & Gabbana. In addition to men's lifestyle magazines, she has been featured in fashion publications, including an appearance in Vogue China and a cover shoot for Vogue Jewelry.

=== Television and acting ===
Trocchia began her television career in 2016, appearing on Sportitalia for the Calciomercato show. In August 2017, she joined Rai Sport as a face of their transfer market coverage (Speciale Calciomercato) on Rai 2, a role she held for two seasons. Her subsequent television appearances include guest roles on the Italia 1 sports talk show Tiki Taka (2018), the Rete 4 program #CR4 - La Repubblica delle Donne hosted by Piero Chiambretti, and the Canale 5 infotainment show Pomeriggio Cinque. In 2025, she returned to Rai 2 as a participant in the late-night variety show Paradise-la finestra sullo showbiz.
