= Schicchi =

Schicchi may refer to:

- Gianni Schicchi, a comic opera in one act by Giacomo Puccini
- Riccardo Schicchi (1953–2012), Italian pornographer
