= Mediaset Plus =

- Country: Italy

Programming
- Language(s): Italian

Ownership
- Owner: Mediaset

History
- Launched: 1 December 2008
- Closed: 2 July 2011

Mediaset Plus was an Italian entertainment television channel which started broadcasting on 1 December 2008, carrying an entertainment-themed programming produced by Mediaset. It closed on 2 July 2011, and its programs were moved to the digital channels La5 and Mediaset Extra.

== Programming ==
- Domenica Cinque
- Mattino Cinque
- Pomeriggio Cinque
- Studio Aperto
- TG5
- Verissimo
- Matrix
