= Ramona Badescu =

Italian actor, singer, model and politician

Ramona Bădescu
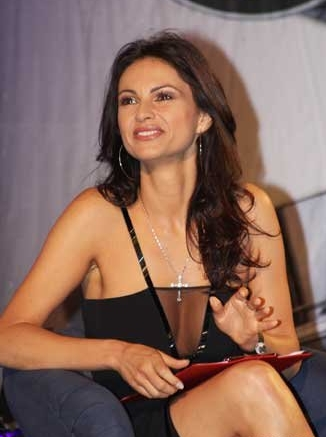
- Ramona Bădescu in June 2008
- Born: 29 November 1968 (age 57); Craiova, Romania
- Occupations: Actress; television personality; showgirl; singer; politician
- Years active: 1991–present

Ramona Bădescu (Romanian pronunciation: [raˈmona bəˈdesku]; born 29 November 1968) is a Romanian-Italian actress, singer, model, and politician. In 2008 Bădescu joined the list of council candidates supporting Gianni Alemanno for Mayor of Rome, but was not successful. However Alemanno was elected mayor and subsequently appointed her his Counsellor for the Romanian Community of Italy.

== Biography ==
She grew up in Romania in a well-off family. She holds a degree in Economics and has lived in Italy since 1990. In addition to her native Romanian, she speaks fluent Italian, French, and English.

In 1996, following her marriage to a Roman lawyer, she also obtained Italian citizenship.

She made her television debut in 1994 in the fantasy series Le storie di Farland, playing the fortune teller Vedonia. She later began her film and television career, appearing in several Italian television productions, including La piovra 8 - Lo scandalo, Incantesimo 2, and I misteri di Cascina Vianello.

She was one of the leading performers of the Bagaglino theatre company, alongside Giulia Montanarini, Pamela Prati, and Angela Melillo, appearing in the show Marameo.

In 2005 she took part in the second edition of the reality television show La fattoria, hosted by Barbara D'Urso with Pupo, and was eliminated during the seventh episode with 61% of the votes.

In 2007 she appeared in several television programmes and performed in theatre in the musical Le magie del Moulin Rouge - Musical romantico, inspired by the Moulin Rouge, alongside Nathalie Caldonazzo.

In May 2010 she released the album Jumi Juma. The title, meaning "half and half", reflects the artist's cultural background—half Italian and half Romanian—with the aim of bringing together the musical traditions of the two countries. The album features reinterpretations of Neapolitan songs in a Balkan style as well as traditional Romanian songs. It also includes a duet with Gigi Finizio, who arranged the song Resta cu'mme.

== Filmography ==
=== Films ===
Year	Title	Role	Notes
1992	Parenti serpenti	Party guest	Cameo appearance
1993	Teste rasate	Waitress	Cameo appearance
1994	Le nuove comiche	Ramona	
1995	La regina degli uomini pesce	The Queen	
1996	Chiavi in mano	Trielina	
1998	Paparazzi	Herself	Cameo appearance
2000	Alex l'ariete	Fabiana	
2000	Bibo per sempre	Alessia	
2001	Caruso, Zero for Conduct	Trielina	

=== Television ===
Year	Title	Role	Notes
1993–1994	Le storie di Farland	Vedonia	Series regular; 40 episodes
1997	La piovra 8 - Lo scandalo	Maria Cariddi	Miniseries
1997	I misteri di Cascina Vianello	Samantha	Episode: "Un matrimonio e un funerale"
1997–1998	Incantesimo	Sonya Laris	Recurring role (seasons 1–2); 17 episodes
1998	Trenta righe per un delitto	Francesca	Episode: "Il serial killer del metronotte"
2005	La Fattoria	Herself	Contestant (season 2)
2006	Lo zio d'America	Sam	Recurring role; 3 episodes
2010	Lo scandalo della Banca Romana	Ida Tanlongo	Miniseries
