= Bastardi =

2008 film

- Directed by: Federico Del Zoppo, Andres Alce Meldonado
- Produced by: Nicolino Matera
- Starring: Franco Nero
- Music by: Massimo Filippini
- Distributed by: Italian Good Fellas
- Release date: 4 January 2008
- Running time: 88 minutes
- Country: Italy
- Language: Italian

Bastardi is a 2008 Italian thriller film directed by Federico Del Zoppo and Andres Alce Meldonado, written by Noa Palotto, Dardano Sacchetti, and Lorenzo De Luca.

== Cast ==
- Franco Nero: René Iuvara
- Barbara Bouchet: Carmen Iuvara
- Don Johnson: Sante Patene
- Giancarlo Giannini: il Gatto/Carlo
- Éva Henger: Lenka
- Enrico Montesano: don Alfonso/Armando
- Massimiliano Caroletti: Luca Iuvara
- Diego Conte: Alessandro Patene
- Pietro Genuardi: Marco Iuvara
- Mercédesz Henger: Orsola Iuvara
- Massimo Vanni: Brasi
- Riccardo Barbera: zio Oscar
- Terry Schiavo: Elisa
- Miriana Trevisan: Amalia
