= La Fattoria season 2 =

La Fattoria 2 is the second season of The Farm was held in 2005, and is one that has undergone major changes. It aired from March 16, 2005 on Canale 5 (the last season was aired on Italia 1) with the conduction of Barbara D'Urso, who has replaced Daria Bignardi as happened previously in the conduct of Grande Fratello. As posted in the location, a ranch in Brazil, was chosen Pupo.

The edition was won by Raffaello Tonon, who clashed for the final victory Sunday, May 29 with singer Mal and Patrizia Rossetti, with whom he befriended in the transmission, the final was followed by 5.696 million (with 31.58% share).

== Contestants ==
- Raffaello Tonon – TV Host.
- Mal – Singer.
- Patrizia Rossetti – TV Host.
- Giulia Montanarini – Showgirl.
- Éva Henger – Pornstar.
- Ugo Conti – Actor.
- Marco Basile – Actor.
- Clayton Norcross – Actor.
- Ramona Badescu – Showgirl.
- Edoardo Costa – Actor.
- Francesca Lodo – Showgirl.
- Francesco Benigno – Actor.
- Cristel Carrisi – Al Bano's daughter.
- Jo Squillo – Singer.

== Nominations ==
	Round 1	Round 2	Round 3	Round 4	Round 5	Round 6	Round 7	Round 8	Round 9	Round 10	Round 11	Final	
Farm Leader	Francesco	Patrizia	Edoardo	Raffaello	Giulia	Marco	Giulia	Mal	Mal	Giulia	Mal	-	
Raffaello	Clayton	Clayton	Francesco	Ramona	Clayton	Clayton	Clayton	Eva	Ugo	Eva	Giulia	Winner	
Mal			Francesco	Francesca	Edoardo	Patrizia	Marco	Marco	Giulia	Patrizia	Giulia	Runner-Up	
Patrizia	Jo	Cristel	Francesco	Francesca	Eva	Eva	Clayton	Giulia	Eva	Eva	Raffaello	3rd Place	
Giulia	Jo	Francesco	Eva	Ugo	Marco	Clayton	Patrizia	Ugo	Raffaello	Mal	Raffaello	Evicted	
Eva			Raffaello	Francesca	Edoardo	Patrizia	Marco	Ugo	Ugo	Patrizia	Evicted		
Ugo	Clayton	Clayton	Raffaello	Giulia	Clayton	Eva	Clayton	Giulia	Eva	Evicted			
Marco	Patrizia	Ramona	Ramona	Giulia	Edoardo	Ramona	Clayton	Giulia	Evicted				
Clayton	Patrizia	Raffaello	Raffaello	Patrizia	Edoardo	Patrizia	Marco	Evicted					
Ramona	Evicted	Clayton	Mal	Francesca	Edoardo	Ugo	Evicted						
Edoardo	Patrizia	Clayton	Clayton	Patrizia	Ramona	Evicted							
Francesca	Jo	Francesco	Eva	Patrizia	Evicted								
Francesco	Ramona	Clayton	Ramona	Evicted									
Francesco	Ugo	Clayton	Ramona	Evicted									
Cristel	Jo	Francesco	Walked										
Jo	Giulia	Ejected											
Walked	None	Cristel	None										
Ejected	René	None											
Nominated	Ugo; Jo	Clayton; Cristel	Clayton; Francesco	Ramona; Francesca	Marco; Edoardo	Patrizia; Ramona	Patrizia; Clayton	Giulia; Marco	Giulia; Ugo	Mal; Eva	Raffaello; Giulia	-	
Evicted	Eviction; Cancelled	None	Francesco; 69%	Francesca; 86%	Edoardo; 65%	Ramona; 61%	Clayton; 57%	Marco; 52%	Ugo; 65%	Eva; 55%	Giulia; 78%		
Evicted	Eviction; Cancelled	None	Francesco; 69%	Francesca; 86%	Edoardo; 65%	Ramona; 61%	Clayton; 57%	Marco; 52%	Ugo; 65%	Eva; 55%	Giulia; 78%	Patrizia; 10% (out of 3)	Mal; 21% (out of 2)
Evicted	Eviction; Cancelled	None	Francesco; 69%	Francesca; 86%	Edoardo; 65%	Ramona; 61%	Clayton; 57%	Marco; 52%	Ugo; 65%	Eva; 55%	Giulia; 78%	Raffaello; 79% to win	
