= Selvaggia Quattrini =

Italian actress and voice actress

- Born: Selvaggia Appignani; 25 June 1975 (age 50); Rome, Italy
- Occupations: Actress; voice actress
- Years active: 1983–present
- Children: 1
- Mother: Paola Quattrini

Selvaggia Quattrini (born Selvaggia Appignani; 25 June 1975) is an Italian actress and voice actress.

== Biography ==
Born in Rome, Italy, to actress Paola Quattrini, Quattrini began her career on stage at just eight years old and she made her very first appearances on screen by the late 1990s. Quattrini's earliest film was Marianna Ucrìa followed by Cuori perduti. She also made numerous appearances on television.

As a voice actress, Quattrini is best known for voicing Princess Fiona in the Italian-Language dub of the Shrek franchise. She has most notably dubbed Kristin Kreuk, Paz Vega and Lake Bell in most of their work. Other actresses she has dubbed includes Halle Berry, Milla Jovovich, Frances O'Connor, Jennifer Love Hewitt, Keira Knightley and Leonor Watling.

== Filmography ==
=== Cinema ===
- Marianna Ucrìa (1997)
- Cuori perduti (1997)
- Gli angeli di Borsellino (2003)
- But When Do the Girls Get Here? (2005)
- Abbraccialo per me (2016)

=== Television ===
- Doctor Giorgia (1997)
- Non lasciamoci più (2001)
- Una donna per amico (2001)
- Incantesimo (2002-2003)
- Imperium: Pompeii (2007)
- Che Dio ci aiuti (2011)
- CentoVetrine (2013)

== Dubbing roles ==
=== Animation ===
- Princess Fiona in Shrek, Shrek 4-D, Shrek 2, Shrek the Third, Shrek Forever After
- Kelly in Handy Manny
- Jeanette in Alvin and the Chipmunks: The Squeakquel, Alvin and the Chipmunks
- Chloe in The Secret Life of Pets, The Secret Life of Pets 2
- Luminara Unduli in Star Wars: The Clone Wars
- Jessica in Scooby-Doo! Camp Scare
- Cleopatra in ChalkZone

=== Live action ===
- Rita in Windtalkers
- Peggy Hodgson in The Conjuring 2
- Jules Paxton in Bend It Like Beckham
- Domino Harvey in Domino
- Georgiana Cavendish in The Duchess
- Fiona in EuroTrip
- Chun-Li in Street Fighter: The Legend of Chun-Li
- Lana Lang in Smallville
- Catherine Chandler in Beauty & the Beast
- Tara Knowles in Sons of Anarchy
- Charlotte Lewis in Lost
- Alison Lockhart in The Affair
- Maya Hansen in Iron Man 3
- Claire Keesey in The Town
- Alma Beers Del Mar in Brokeback Mountain
- Ruth in A Million Ways to Die in the West
- Sweet Polly Purebred in Underdog
- Erin Gilbert in Ghostbusters
- Maggie Mayhem in Whip It
- Katie Van Waldenberg in Blades of Glory
- Delilah Blaine in The Tuxedo
- Divina Martinez in Paul Blart: Mall Cop 2
- Cecily Cardew in The Importance of Being Earnest
- Leticia Musgrove in Monster's Ball
- Lynn in Sunshine Cleaning
- Colette McVeigh in Shadow Dancer
- Latika in Slumdog Millionaire
- Beth Green in The Lucky One
