= Beyond Silence (1996 film) =

1996 film

Jenseits der Stille
- Theatrical release poster
- Directed by: Caroline Link
- Written by: Caroline Link; Beth Serlin
- Produced by: Jakob Claussen; Thomas Wöbke; Luggi Waldleitner
- Starring: Sylvie Testud; Howie Seago; Emmanuelle Laborit; Sibylle Canonica; Matthias Habich; Hansa Czypionka; Tatjana Trieb
- Cinematography: Gernot Roll
- Edited by: Patricia Rommel
- Music by: Niki Reiser
- Production companies: Claussen + Wöbke Filmproduktion; Roxy Film
- Distributed by: Buena Vista International
- Release date: 19 December 1996
- Running time: 112 minutes
- Country: Germany
- Languages: German; German Sign Language
- Box office: $11.5 million

Beyond Silence (German: Jenseits der Stille) is a 1996 German film directed by Caroline Link. The film was nominated for the Academy Award for Best Foreign Language Film at the 70th Academy Awards.

== Plot ==
The film tells the story of Lara, who grows up as the daughter of deaf parents, Martin and Kai. Lara herself is hearing and is fluent in sign language. Even as a young child, she serves as an interpreter for her parents in many situations, such as credit negotiations at the bank as well as her own parent–teacher conference, although not always completely truthfully.

Lara receives a clarinet for Christmas from Clarissa, her father's sister and an enthusiastic musician. Lara discovers the world of music, where her parents cannot follow her. In the years that follow, she is discovered to be a talented clarinet player. When 18-year-old Lara wants to study at a music conservatory in Berlin, the family seems to break apart. Lara finds love in Berlin with a teacher of deaf children.

After Kai is killed in a bicycle accident, Lara's grieving father feels abandoned. Lara bounces from her family home, to her aunt's, to her uncle's before returning to her childhood home. The ending seems to reconcile it all: Martin tries to understand the love of music that his daughter feels, and the film ends with a cautious reunion between him and Lara.

== Cast ==
- Sylvie Testud as Lara
- Tatjana Trieb as young Lara
- Howie Seago as Martin
- Emmanuelle Laborit as Kai
- Sibylle Canonica as Clarissa
- Matthias Habich as Gregor (Clarissa's husband)
- Alexandra Bolz as Marie
- Hansa Czypionka as Tom
- Doris Schade as Lilli
- Horst Sachtleben as Robert
- Hubert Mulzer as Mister Gärtner
- Birge Schade as Miss Mertens
- Stephan Kampwirth as Bank Manager

== Reviews ==
Beyond Silence has an 83% approval rating on Rotten Tomatoes.

- "A successful film debut of a graduate of the Munich Film Academy. The film is a sensible presentation of the problem of the handicapped as well as the universal theme of the self discovery of a young woman and the plea for understanding and openness about seemingly disproportionate experiences." (film-dienst 25/1996)
- "Whoever would like to find out how loud the snow is and how the sounds of a clarinet can enchant people, should not allow themselves to miss this film: a German production which takes up extraordinary themes across the relationship-comedy and tells the story about saying goodbye to one's childhood with gentle humor and an idiosyncratic aesthetic." (Fischer Film Almanach, 1997)
- "A film that allows silence to become music and has found strength in the balance between laughing and crying, happiness and pain. "Jenseits der Stille" is memorable among German productions, and excellently cast. (Dirk Jasper FilmLexikon)
- "Thanks to good casting for all roles and assured acting performances under its direction, this [film is] a successful journey into the world of the deaf, with all its problems of social integration and family conflict." (FBW Langfilme)

== Accolades ==
Year	Award	Category	Recipient	Result
1997	Bavarian Film Awards	Best Director	Caroline Link	Won
1997	Bavarian Film Awards	Best Film Score	Niki Reiser	Won
1997	Chicago International Film Festival	Special Mention	Caroline Link	Won
1997	Chicago International Film Festival	Best Film	Caroline Link	Nominated
1997	Deutscher Filmpreis	Best Performance by an Actress in a Leading Role	Sylvie Testud	Won
1997	Deutscher Filmpreis	Best Editing	Niki Reiser	Won
1997	Deutscher Filmpreis	Outstanding Feature Film	Caroline Link	Won
1997	Deutscher Filmpreis	Best Performance by an Actress in a Supporting Role	Emmanuelle Laborit	Nominated
1997	Deutscher Filmpreis	Best Direction	Caroline Link	Nominated
1997	Guild of German Art House Cinemas	German Film	Caroline Link	Won
1997	Palm Springs International Film Festival	Best Foreign Language Film	Caroline Link	Nominated
1997	Tokyo International Film Festival	Best Screenplay Award	Caroline Link	Won
1997	Tokyo International Film Festival	Tokyo Grand Prix	Caroline Link	Won
1997	Vancouver International Film Festival	Most Popular Film	Caroline Link	Won
1997	Young Artist Award	Best Family Feature - Foreign	Caroline Link	Nominated
1997	Young Artist Award	Best Performance in a Foreign Film	Tatjana Trieb	Nominated
1998	Academy Awards	Best Foreign Language Film	Caroline Link	Nominated
1998	National Board of Review	Top Foreign Films	Caroline Link	Won

== See also ==
- List of submissions to the 70th Academy Awards for Best Foreign Language Film
- List of German submissions for the Academy Award for Best Foreign Language Film
- List of films featuring the deaf and hard of hearing
- Khamoshi: The Musical (1996), Indian film with similar plot.

== Book ==
- Link, Caroline (2001). Jenseits der Stille. Berlin: Aufbau. ISBN 978-3-7466-1453-3.
