= Torno a vivere da solo =

- Directed by: Jerry Calà
- Written by: Jerry Calà; Gino Capone
- Produced by: Massimiliano Caroletti
- Starring: Jerry Calà; Enzo Iacchetti; Tosca D'Aquino; Paolo Villaggio; Éva Henger; Don Johnson; Randi Ingerman
- Cinematography: Duccio Cimatti
- Music by: Umberto Smaila
- Release date: 5 December 2008
- Running time: 104 minutes
- Country: Italy
- Language: Italian

Torno a vivere da solo (I'll be back to living alone) is a 2008 Italian comedy film written, directed and starred by Jerry Calà. It is the sequel of Marco Risi's Vado a vivere da solo (1982).

== Plot ==
In Milan, Giacomo is a good real estate agent. But he fights with his wife, because he does not stand his life, and wants to be the guy globetrotter of yesteryear. The two are separated, and Giacomo tries to change his life with Jessica. However, Giacomo has to deal with the problems of the life of a grown man, because he can no longer act like a kid.

== Cast ==
- Jerry Calà: Giacomo
- Enzo Iacchetti: Ivano
- Tosca D'Aquino: Francesca
- Paolo Villaggio: Giacomo's father
- Éva Henger: Jessica
- Don Johnson (dubbed by Roberto Pedicini): Nico
- Randi Ingerman: Lory
- Gisella Sofio: Giacomo's mother
- Mercédesz Henger: Chiara
- Mara Venier: Herself
- Piero Mazzarella: Barbone
- Sergio Fiorentini: Peppino
