= Sibylle Canonica =

Swiss actress

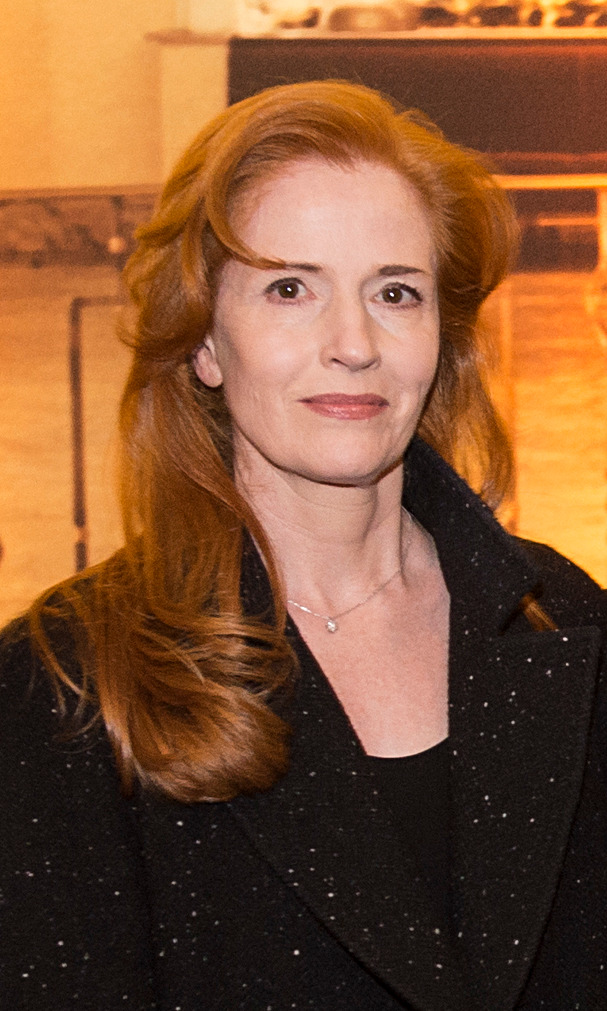
- Born: 26 April 1957 (age 68); Bern, Switzerland
- Occupation: Actress
- Years active: 1981–present

Sibylle Canonica (born 26 April 1957) is a Swiss actress. She appeared in more than forty films since 1981. Canonica received her training at the Folkwang University of the Arts in Essen. She played at the Oldenburgisches Staatstheater, the Schiller Theater Berlin, the Staatstheater Stuttgart, the Düsseldorfer Schauspielhaus and the Munich Kammerspiele. Since 2001 she has been engaged at the Residenz Theatre in Munich.

== Selected filmography ==
Film
Year	Title	Role	Notes
1989	Waller's Last Trip	Rosina	
1995	After Five in the Forest Primeval	Johanna	
1996	Beyond Silence	Lara's aunt	
2001	Mostly Martha	Frida	
2008	Age and Beauty	Rosi	
2011	Hotel Lux	Frau Platten	
