= Marianna Ucrìa =

1997 film

- Film poster
- Directed by: Roberto Faenza
- Written by: Dacia Maraini; Roberto Faenza
- Starring: Emmanuelle Laborit
- Cinematography: Tonino Delli Colli
- Edited by: Roberto Perpignani
- Music by: Ennio Morricone; Franco Piersanti
- Distributed by: Cecci Gori
- Release date: 7 February 1997 (Italy)
- Running time: 108 minutes
- Country: Italy
- Language: Italian
- Box office: $0.8 million (Italy)

Marianna Ucrìa is a 1997 Italian drama film directed by Roberto Faenza. It is based on a novel by Dacia Maraini. It was entered into the 20th Moscow International Film Festival.

== Plot ==
In Sicily, in the first half of the eighteenth century, the twelve-year-old Marianna Ucrìa was taken by her grandfather to watch a hanging, in the hope that the show could make her recover from silence. But all is in vain. Marianna does not speak and does not hear. She is thus induced by her mother to marry her uncle Pietro and, when she reaches sixteen, she has already given birth to three children. Having become a young woman, she welcomes the visit of Grass, a French instructor who initiates her to sign language and introduces her to the Enlightenment philosophical ideas that move around Europe. When her husband dies, Marianna finds herself having to manage her life and relationships with others. She thus demonstrates that she has acquired a strong personality that allows her to govern relationships with easement and an important romantic relationship with the brother of her servant Fila. By now a mature and conscious woman, Marianna is able to understand the terrible secret that had been hidden to her: her silence came from the trauma caused by the sexual violence suffered by her uncle Pietro.

== Cast ==
- Emmanuelle Laborit as Marianna Ucrìa
- Bernard Giraudeau as Grass
- Laura Morante as Maria
- Philippe Noiret as Duke Signoretto, grandfather of Marianna
- Laura Betti as Giuseppa
- Leopoldo Trieste as Pretore Camaleo
- Lorenzo Crespi as Saro
- Roberto Herlitzka as Duke Pietro
- Silvana Gasparini as Fiammetta
- Eva Grieco as Marianna when child
- Selvaggia Quattrini as Fila
- Pamela Saino as Giuseppa when child

== Reception ==
The film opened in Italy on 39 screens and grossed $155,893 for the weekend, placing tenth at the box office. After four weeks it had grossed $779,270.

== See also ==
- List of films featuring the deaf and hard of hearing
