= Emmanuelle Laborit =

French actress (born 1971)

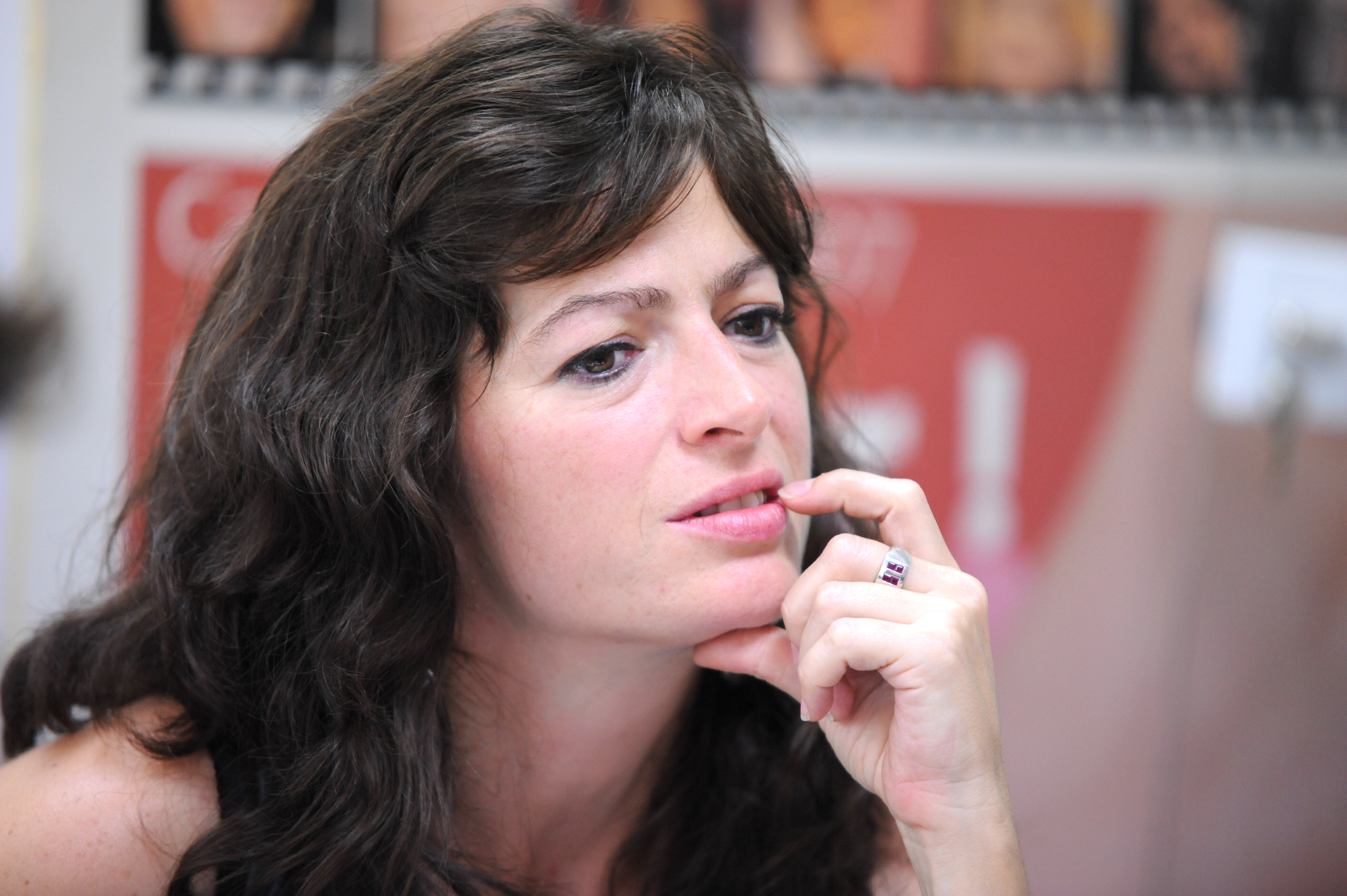
- Laborit in 2009
- Born: 18 October 1971 (age 54); Paris, France
- Occupation: Actor
- Years active: 1994-present

Emmanuelle Laborit (born 18 October 1971) is a deaf French actress. She appeared in more than ten films since 1994. Marianna Ucriya, An Air So Pure, Beyond Silence and Still Liebe are some of them. She is married to Jean Darlic, a French theatre and cine artist.

== Selected filmography ==
| Year | Title | Role | Notes |
|---|---|---|---|
| 1997 | Marianna Ucrìa | | |
| 1997 | An Air So Pure | Mathilde | |
| 1996 | Beyond Silence | | |
