= Chiara Boni =

Italian fashion designer and journalist (born 1948)

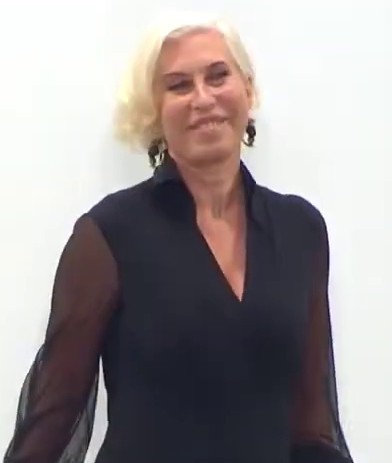
- Boni at the 2017 New York Fashion Week
- Born: Maria Chiara Boni; 27 August 1948 (age 77); Florence, Italy
- Occupation: fashion designer
- Spouses: Vittorio Maschietto (m. 1970, divorced) Angelo Rovati (m. 2006; died 2013)
- Partners: Vittorio Sgarbi; Cesare Romiti; Fabrizio Rindi
- Children: 1
- Awards: Knight of Labour

Chiara Boni (born 27 August 1948) is an Italian fashion designer and journalist.

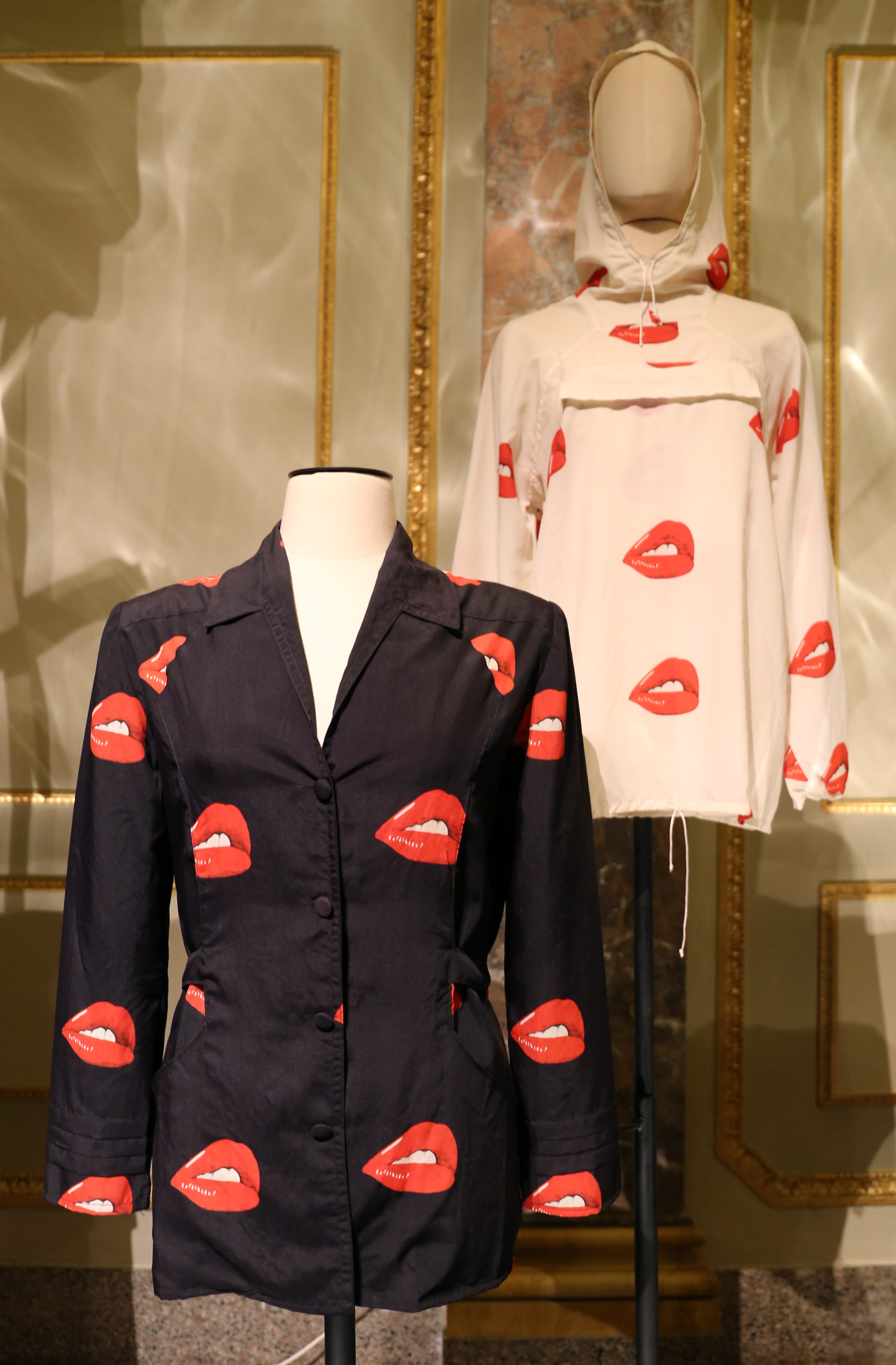
Chiara Boni designs from the You Tarzan Me Jane collection (1974)

== Early life ==
She was born in Florence to Antonio Boni and Maria Teresa Masetti Fedi. She graduated from a liceo linguistico.

== Career ==
In 1971 Boni opened her first clothing and accessories boutique You Tarzan Me Jane in Florence. A member of the group UFO (Urban Future Organization), in 1973 her first magazine cover was for Domus.

In 1975, she launched her first couture collection. In 1985, following an agreement with the Gruppo Finanziario Tessile (Gft), she founded the company Chiara Boni Spa and launched her eponymous brand. In 2008, she launched the collections "Chiara Boni Girl" and "La Petite Robe".

Boni's neo-avantgarde style is characterized by the use of stretch or soft materials, notably spandex and organza. She is known for her often provocative fashion shows In the 1990s she was one of the first stylists to organise a fashion show consisting of only transsexual models, and she brought pornstars Moana Pozzi and Éva Henger onto the catwalk.

Beyond her fashion career, Boni hosted Il dilemma - Storia di famiglie allargate on Rai 3 and was a contestant in Ballando con le Stelle, the Italian version of Dancing with the Stars. Between 2000 and 2005 she served as Regional Councillor for Image and Communication of Tuscany.

== Personal life ==
Chiara Boni married twice and has one son, Giacomo.
