= Federica Panicucci =

Italian television host and radio personality

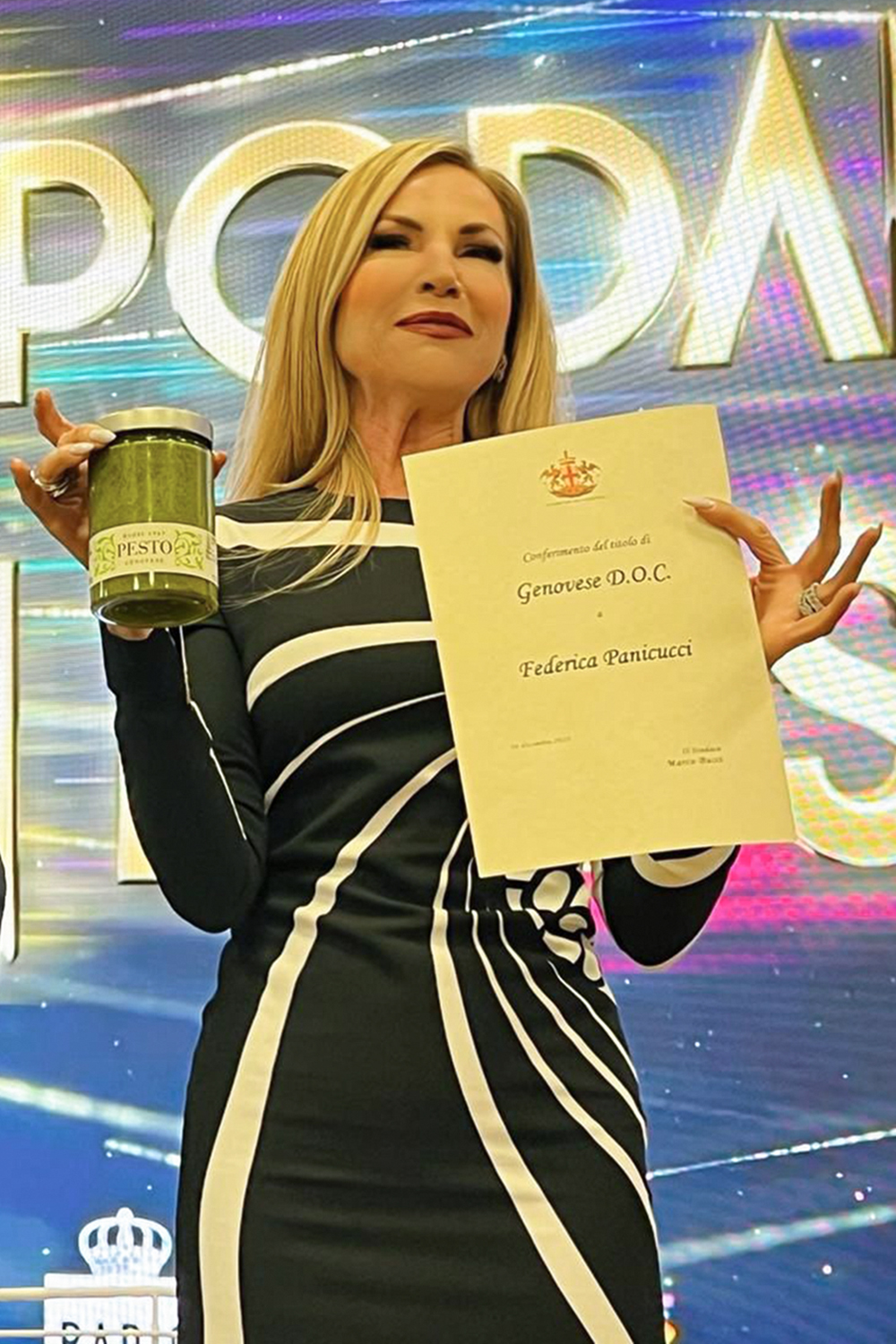
- Born: 27 October 1967 (age 58); Cecina, Italy
- Occupations: Television host, radio personality
- Years active: 1987–present
- Spouse: Mario Fargetta (2006–2015)
- Children: Sofia; Mattia

Federica Panicucci (born 27 October 1967) is an Italian television host and radio personality.

== Biography ==
Born in Cecina, she debuted in 1987 in Portobello, with Enzo Tortora, as one of the "telephonists". The year after she was in the cast of the daily television game Il gioco delle coppie.

From 1991 to 1996, she was one of the most important presenters of Italian TV channel Italia 1, where she hosted Unomania, Twin Clips, Smile and the important summer music festival Festivalbar. In the second half of the 1990s, she hosted such shows as Arrivano gli uomini, Jammin Night, Il ballo delle debuttanti, aired by Italia 1 and Rai 1.

In 2000, she started working on Rai 2 hosting the daily programme Affari di cuore, until 2002, and then on the same TV channel other talk shows about love stories like Batticuore and Scherzi d'amore. From 2003 to 2005 she hosted the hilarious late night show Bulldozer with Enrico Bertolino and then the TV events Concerto di Natale and Bravograzie.

In 2006, she married the Italian DJ Fargetta, with whom she has two children. In the same year she came back to Italia 1 where she led an episode of Comedy Club and, in the autumn of the same year, the Italian version of Beauty and the Geek, named La pupa e il secchione, with Enrico Papi, one of her greatest TV successes. The year after she hosted the pilot Mi raccomando and the comedy shows Candid Camera and Cupido.

From September 2009, she moved to Canale 5 to host the morning infotainment show Mattino cinque, with (until February 2010) and with Paolo Del Debbio (from February 2010), replacing Barbara D'Urso. From January 2011 to April 2012 Panicucci (with Claudio Brachino until December 2011) replaced d'Urso in another infotainment show, Domenica cinque, on air on Canale 5 on Sunday afternoon.

She added radio hosting to her career in 1996, when she began to host Dear Deejay on Radio Deejay, until 2003. In 2006 she hosted Superclassifiche on R101, followed by La superclassifica, a programme about the Italian music chart which is still on air.

== Filmography ==
Films + television roles
Year	Title	Role	Notes
1988	Balliamo e cantiamo con Licia	Jessica	Italian TV Series
1998	Laura non-c'è	Mrs. Baldi	Feature film
2008	I Cesaroni	Herself	Italian TV Series
2008, 2017	Buona la prima!	Various	Italian variety show

== Television ==
- Portobello (Rai 2, 1987)
- Il gioco delle coppie (Canale 5, Retequattro, 1988–1990)
- Unomania (Italia 1, 1991–1994)
- Twin clips (Italia 1, 1991–1992)
- Festivalbar – Zona verde (Italia 1, 1992)
- Festivalbar (Italia 1, 1993–1995)
- Smile (Italia 1, 1994–1995)
- Arrivano gli uomini (Rai 1, 1996)
- Capodanno in diretta (Italia 1, 1996)
- Premio Regia Televisiva (Rai 1, 1997–1998)
- Jammin Night (Italia 1, 1996–1997)
- Il ballo delle debuttanti (1997)
- La notte delle muse (1997)
- La partita del cuore (Rai 2, 1998)
- Affari di cuore (Rai 2, 2000–2002)
- Batticuore (Rai 2, 2001)
- Scherzi d'amore (Rai 2, 2001)
- Destinazione Sanremo (2002)
- Bulldozer (Rai 2, 2003–2005)
- Concerto di Natale (Rai 2, 2005)
- Bravo grazie (Rai 2, 2005)
- Comedy Club (Italia 1, 2006)
- La pupa e il secchione (2006)
- Mi raccomando (2007)
- Candid Camera (2007–2008)
- Cupido (2009)
- Mattino cinque (2009–present)
- Finale Mediafriends Cup 2010 (2010)
- Domenica cinque (2011–2012)

== Radio ==
- Dear deejay (Radio DeeJay, 1996–2003)
- Super classifiche (Radio 101, 2006)
- La superclassifica (Radio 101, 2006–present)
