= Doctor Giorgia =

- Italian: La dottoressa Giò
- Genre: Comedy-drama; Medical drama
- Created by: Filippo De Luigi; Antonello Grimaldi
- Starring: Barbara D'Urso; Fabio Testi; Flavio Bucci; Riccardo Cucciolla; Carola Stagnaro; Marina Ninchi; Claudio Belli; Eleonora Pariante; Sabina Stilo; Corrado Invernizzi; Filippo Nigro; Paolo Calissano; Anna Rilke; Zoe Incrocci; Paki Valente; Fabio Grossi; Marco Bonini; Alessia Giuliani; Christopher Lambert; Camilla Ferranti; Maximilian Nisi; Rocco Tanica; Susy Laude; Paola Tiziana Cruciani; Eleonora D'Urso; Teresa Romagnoli; Filippo Gattuso; Desirée Noferini; Simone Corbisiero; Eleonora Belcamino
- Country of origin: Italy
- Original language: Italian
- No. of seasons: 3
- No. of episodes: 19

Production
- Running time: 90 minutes

Original release
- Network: Rete 4 (season 1-2); Canale 5 (season 3)
- Release: October 25, 1997 – January 29, 2019

Doctor Giorgia (Italian: La dottoressa Giò) is an Italian medical comedy-drama television series.

== Cast and characters ==
- Barbara D'Urso as Dr. Giorgia Basile
- Fabio Testi as Armando Colucci (season 1-2)
- Flavio Bucci as Dr. Nicotera (season 1-2)
- Riccardo Cucciolla as Dr. Lombardi (season 1-2)
- Marina Ninchi as Adelaide (season 1-2)
- Luciano Roffi as Dr. Capovilla (season 1-2)
- Eleonora Pariante as Betta (season 1-2)
- Selvaggia Quattrini (season 1) and Sabrina Stilo (season 2) as Mara (season 1-2)
- Filippo Nigro as Paolo (season 1-2)
- Paolo Calissano as Dr. Gianmaria Stefani (season 1-2)
- Anna Rilke as Daniela (season 1-2)
- Fabio Grossi as Renzo (season 1-2)
- Amarily Lemos as Martina (season 1)
- Corrado Invernizzi as Cesare (season 1)
- Zoe Incrocci as Giacinta (season 1)
- Carola Stagnaro as Dr. Priscilla Finzi (season 2)
- Paki Valente as Father Lorenzo (season 2)
- Marco Bonini as Dr. Paolo Zampelli (season 3)
- Christopher Lambert as Sergio Monti (season 3)
- Camilla Ferranti as Anna Torre (season 3)
- Alessia Giuliani as Sandra Giusti (season 3)
- Rocco Tanica as Fabio Bracco (season 3)
- Susy Laude as Monica Poggi (season 3)
- Paola Tiziana Cruciani as Gigliola Ardenzi (season 3)
- Teresa Romagnoli as Angela (season 3)
- Desirée Noferini as Francesca Biondi (season 3)
- Eleonora Belcamino (season 3)
- Simone Corbisiero as Luca (season 3)
- Filippo Gattuso as Giacomo (season 3)

== Episodes ==
Season	Episodes	Originally released	
Season	Episodes	First released	Last released
1	5	October 25, 1997	November 25, 1997
2	6	November 13, 1998	December 13, 1998
3	4	January 13, 2019	January 29, 2019

== See also ==
- List of Italian television series
