= My-Tv =

- Available in: Italian, English
- Headquarters: Milan, Rome, Italy
- Area served: Worldwide
- Owners: RCS MediaGroup, Mediobanca, Gruppo Ciancio.
- Founder: Salvo Mizzi
- President: Salvo Mizzi
- CEO: Benedetto Habib
- Key people: Paola Jacobbi (Editor-in-chief), Lucio Dalla, Andrea Zingoni, Joshua Held
- Industry: Streaming
- Services: On-demand video streaming
- Website: www.my-tv.it
- Registration: Not required
- Launched: 9 November 2000
- Current status: Not active

My-Tv was Italy's first internet television service. Owned by RCS MediaGroup, Mediobanca and Gruppo Ciancio, it streamed on-demand video content from Milan and Rome that included music and information about events, clubs and shopping.

== History ==
My-Tv was founded in 2000 in Milan by Salvo Mizzi, and it's considered the first Italian web television.

In Italy My-Tv programs "have been the only ones to be rebroadcasted [sic] by television channels thanks to their huge internet circulation and success". Art director was popular Italian singer-songwriter Lucio Dalla.

== See also ==
- Alternative media
