= Riccardo Schicchi =

Italian film director

- Born: Riccardo Schicchi; 12 March 1953; Augusta, Sicily, Italy
- Died: 9 December 2012 (aged 59); Rome, Lazio, Italy
- Occupations: Director; photographer; entrepreneur; producer; talent scout
- Political party: Love Party
- Spouse: Éva Henger (m. 1994)
- Children: Mercédesz Henger; Riccardo Schicchi Jr.

Riccardo Schicchi (Italian pronunciation: [rikˈkardo ˈskikki]; 12 March 1953 – 9 December 2012) was an Italian pornographer.

== Biography ==
Riccardo Schicchi was born in Augusta, Sicily in 1953.

He graduated from art school with a specialization in photography, and began working as a photographer for Epoca magazine, travelling to several parts of the world, including war zones.

He began co-hosting, with Ilona Staller, the radio show Voulez-vous coucher avec moi?, featuring discussions about sex, with live calls from the audience. In 1983, Schicchi and Staller (nicknamed "Cicciolina") founded the model agency Diva Futura.

Schicchi established a political party, Partito dell'Amore (The Love Party), fronted by his associate Moana Pozzi, which parodied other Italian political parties. It was later identified as a counterculture movement by exponents Mauro Biuzzi and Marcella Zingarini. The party supported the legalisation of brothels and improved sex education. In the 1992 general election, the Love Party, led by Pozzi, received over 16,000 votes, but did not surpass the minimum threshold for admission into the lower Chamber.

Schicchi also discovered Éva Henger, who later became his wife in 1994. The couple had two children, Mercédesz (1991) and Riccardo Jr. (1994), before separating, though they never officially divorced.

Schicchi suffered from diabetes mellitus type 2, which led to his hospitalization in 2012 due to a diabetic coma, assisted by Henger. The disease also impaired his vision and caused chronic kidney disease. Schicchi died in San Pietro Hospital, Rome, on 9 December 2012.

== Legacy ==
Riccardo Schicchi was portrayed by Fausto Paravidino in Moana, a 2009 biographical miniseries about Moana Pozzi. He was also portrayed by Vincenzo Nemolato in Supersex, a 2024 biographical miniseries loosely based on the life of Rocco Siffredi.

Diva Futura is a 2024 film written and directed by Giulia Louise Steigerwalt about Schicchi's pornographic film studio, starring Pietro Castellitto as Schicchi. The film premiered at the 81st Venice International Film Festival.
