= Paolo Del Debbio =

Italian journalist and TV presenter (born 1958)

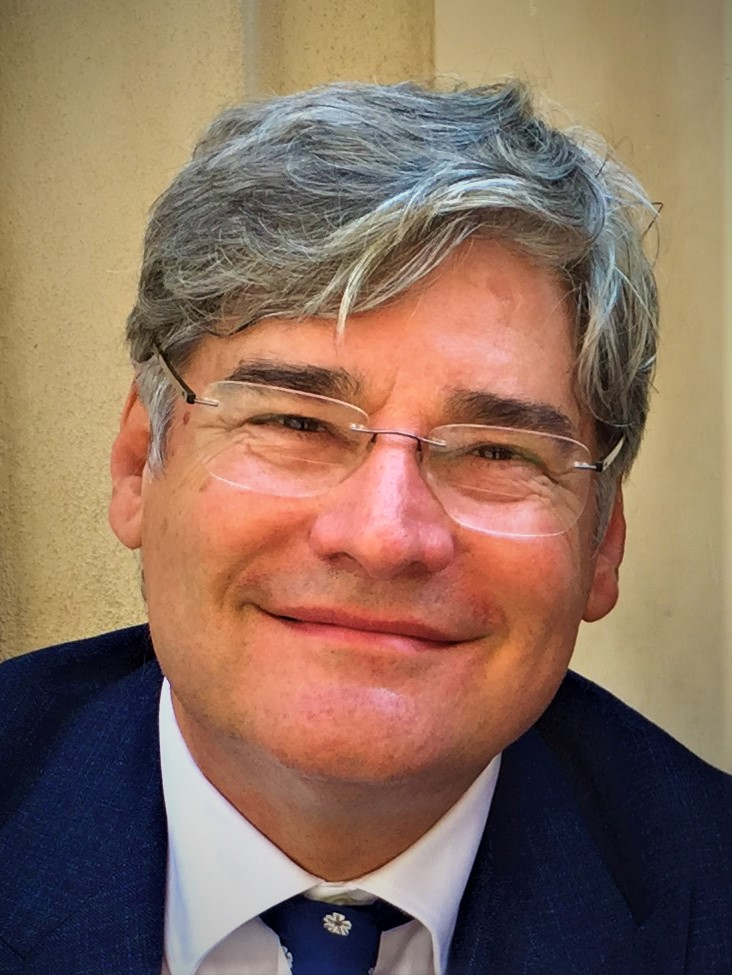
- Born: 2 February 1958 (age 68); Lucca, Italy
- Occupations: Journalist and television presenter

Paolo Del Debbio is an Italian journalist, television presenter, and politician. He is also a lecturer in ethics and economics at the IULM University of Milan.

== Biography ==
Del Debbio was born in Lucca in 1958. He obtained a bachelor's degree in philosophy from the Pontifical University of the Holy Cross in Rome and a degree in philosophy from the Pontifical Urban University. In 1988, Del Debbio began working for Silvio Berlusconi's Fininvest group, first as coordinator of the research department and then as assistant to CEO Fedele Confalonieri. At Fininvest, Del Debbio met Gina Nieri, with whom he married and had two daughters: Maddalena and Sara.

Working at Fininvest until 1993, Del Debbio was among the founders of Forza Italia, the liberal-conservative party launched by Berlusconi. Del Debbio wrote the party's political program, and was the director of the party's national studies office from 1994 to 1997. In the 1995 Tuscan regional election, Del Debbio was the candidate for president for the centre-right Pole for Freedoms but was defeated. Later, from 1998 to 2001, he was municipal minister for the suburbs and security in the city government of Milan under mayor Gabriele Albertini (Forza Italia).

Since 2001, Del Debbio has been a freelance journalist, enrolled in the Order of Journalists of Lombardy. Since 2004, he has presented several talk shows on Mediaset networks, such as Secondo voi (2004 – 2010), Mattino Cinque (2010 – 2013), Quinta colonna (2012 – 2018), Dalla vostra parte (2015 – 2016), and Dritto e rovescio (since 2019).
