= Sara Tommasi =

Italian actress

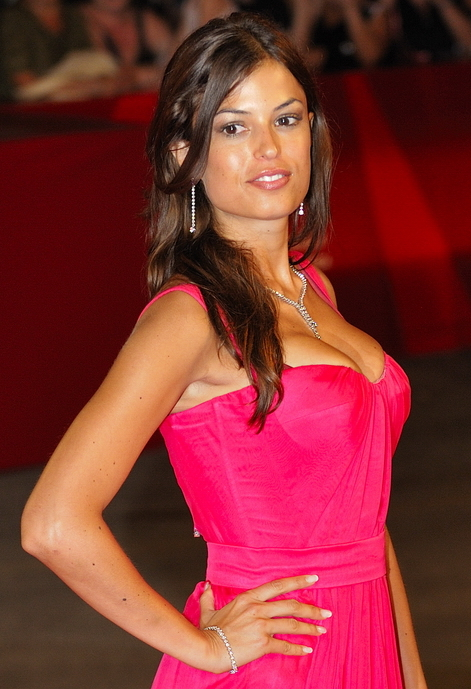
- Tommasi at the 2009 Venice Film Festival
- Born: 9 June 1981 (age 45); Narni, Umbria, Italy
- Education: Bocconi University
- Occupations: Actress; television personality; pornographic actress
- Height: 5 ft 7 in (1.70 m)

Sara Tommasi (born 9 June 1981) is an Italian actress, television personality, and former pornographic actress. She made her film debut in the 2008 comedy Ultimi della classe, playing a teacher who had appeared in a "sexy" calendar shoot. Tommasi herself had appeared topless in a Max Calendar shoot in 2007. In 2010, she appeared nude in an episode of the television series Crimini.

== Personal life ==
She graduated in economics at Bocconi University in Milan. Currently she lives in Egypt. She married her manager Antonio Orso on 21 March 2021. Only seven guests attended due to COVID-19 restrictions.

== Adult film ==
Tommasi's first hardcore film, Sara Tommasi: Il Mio Primo Film Hard, featuring her in explicit, non-simulated sex scenes, was released in 2012. About her pornographic work, she said that she had not done anything wrong. "I have put my body at the service of the nation."
