= Saturday Night Live from Milano =

Italian version of the American TV show Saturday Night Live

- Also known as: Sabato Notte Live; Saturday Night Live
- Presented by: Paolo Bonolis and Luca Laurenti (1994); Claudio Bisio (2018)
- Country of origin: Italy
- Original language: Italian
- No. of seasons: 4
- No. of episodes: 8 (Seasons 1–2); 10 (Seasons 3–4)

Production
- Production location: Milan, Italy
- Running time: 60 mins.

Original release
- Network: Canale 5
- Release: 1994 – 1994
- Network: Italia 1
- Release: November 11, 2006 – 2011
- Network: TV8
- Release: 7 April – 12 May 2018

Saturday Night Live from Milano, also known as Saturday Night Live, was the Italian localization of the popular US-comedy television series Saturday Night Live, shown on Mediaset television channels Canale 5 in 1994 and later on Italia 1 from 2006 to 2011. In 2018, the format was shortly revived by TV8.
