= Mal (singer) =

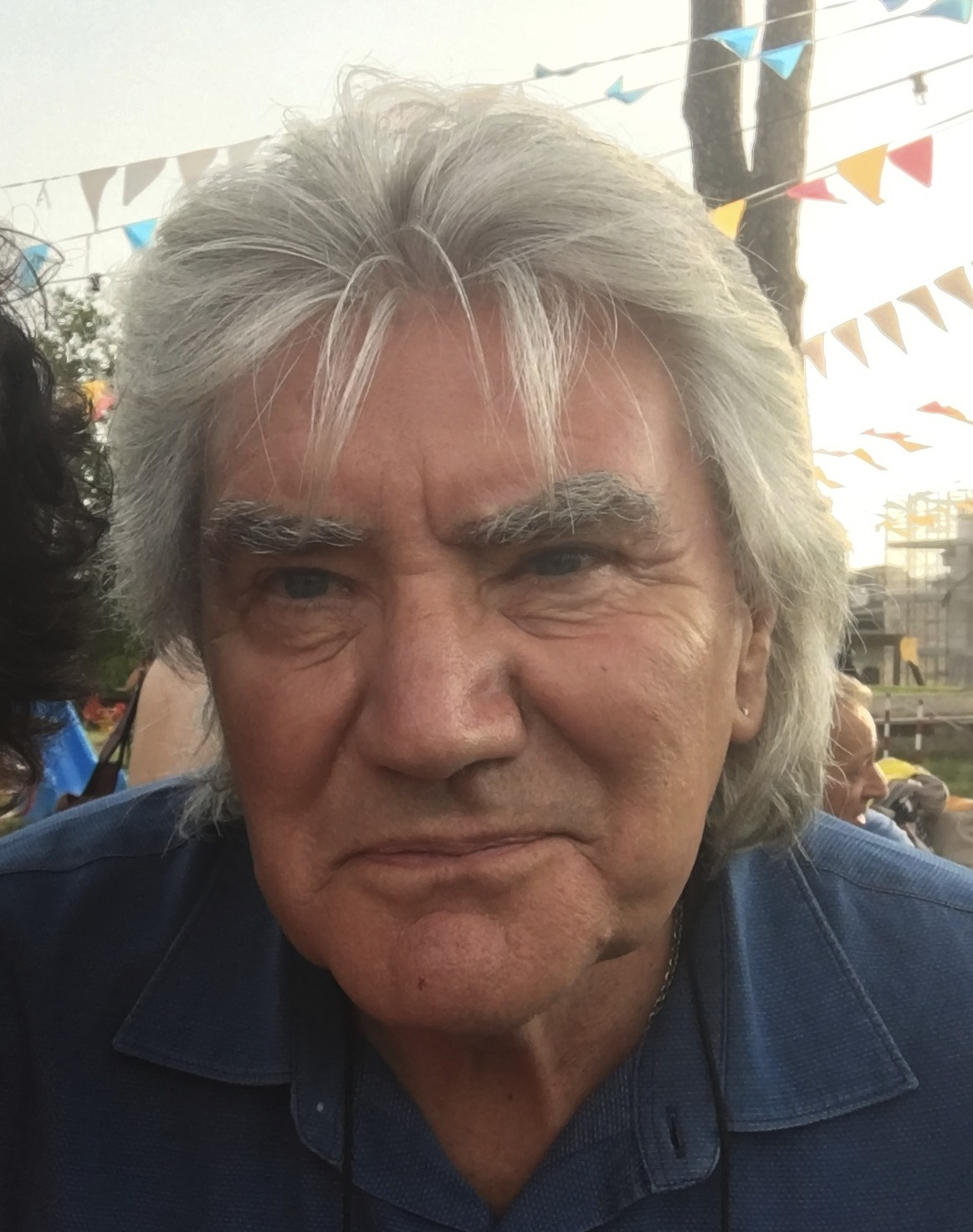
- Mal in 2018

Background information
- Born: Paul Bradley Couling; 27 February 1944 (age 82); Llanfrenchfa, Wales
- Genres: Beat
- Occupation: Singer
- Instrument: Vocals
- Years active: 1962–present
- Labels: Pye; RCA Victor; Carosello; Ricordi; Baby Records
- Spouse: Renata Maialetti
- Website: www.mal.it

Paul Bradley Couling (born 27 February 1944), known by his stage name Mal or Mal Ryder, is a singer who achieved popularity in Italy in the late 1960s, singing with his band Mal and the Primitives. Born in Wales, he became a naturalized Italian citizen in 1989. One of his biggest hits was the Italian theme of the TV series Fury.

== Life and career ==
Born in Llanfrenchfa, at young age Mal moved to Oxford, where he worked as an electrician and was vocalist in a number of local groups. In 1963, he formed the group Mal Ryder and the Spirits, which whom he recorded two singles for Decca.

In 1965, he joined the group The Primitives, with whom he recorded two singles for Pye. The same year, Gianni Boncompagni and Alberico Crocetta offered the band a contract to perform at Piper Club in Rome. In 1966, the band toured Italy, enjoying immediate success and deciding to settle there. The band's debut Italian single Yeeeeeh! was a massive hit. Music journalist Phil Smee identified their song Johnny noooo! as a key example of freakbeat. Mal attracted most interest by media and fans, leading to the group splitting and Mal starting a solo career.

Mal's first solo hit was Bambolina, which was followed by his Sanremo Music Festival 1969 entry Tu sei bella come sei and by Pensiero d'amore, a cover of Bee Gees' "I've Gotta Get a Message to You", which was also adapted in a musicarello film with the same title starring the same Mal and Silvia Dionisio.

Following two more Sanremo Music Festivals, in 1970 with "Sole pioggia e vento" and in 1971 with "Non dimenticarti di me", and a few more hits, notably "Betty Blue", Mal returned to perform in English language with "Mighty Mighty Roly Poly". In 1975, his career was relaunched by the unexpected success of his cover version of 1932 song "Parlami d'amore Mariù", which topped the Italian hit parade. In 1977, he sold over one million copies with "Furia", the Italian opening theme used for the re-run of the TV-series Fury.

In 1982, Mal made his return to the Sanremo Music Festival with "Sei la mia donna". In the following years, his musical career consisted mainly of live events and appearances on nostalgia-themed TV shows. In 1997, he took part in a successful stage musical version of Grease starring Lorella Cuccarini. In 2005, he took part in the Canale 5 reality show La Fattoria 2. In 2023, he was the Hippo in Il cantante mascherato, the Italian version of Masked Singer.

== Personal life ==
Mal is married to Renata Maialetti and has a son, Kevin, and a daughter, Karen. They live in Pordenone. Born in a Protestant family, he identifies as an atheist.
