= Milano-Roma =

Milano-Roma was a reality show broadcast on the Italian television channel Rai Tre at the end of the 1990s. It starred two VIPs traveling by car from Milan to Rome.

In an episode from February 1998, Dario Fo was informed that he had won the Nobel prize for literature while traveling with Ambra Angiolini by a sign from another car on the motorway.
