= Domenica Cinque =

Italian television program

- Starring: Barbara D'Urso (2009-2010); Claudio Brachino and Federica Panicucci (2011); Federica Panicucci (2012)
- Country of origin: Italy

Production
- Running time: 300 minutes

Original release
- Network: Canale 5
- Release: 20 September 2009 – 29 April 2012

Domenica Cinque is an Italian entertainment television news program broadcast every Sunday on Canale 5 and rerun on Mediaset Plus and Mediaset Extra. It was produced in collaboration with Videonews. In 2012 it was cancelled due to low audience, and afterward replaced by Domenica Live with Barbara D'Urso as host.
