= Mattino Cinque =

- Starring: Barbara D'Urso and Claudio Brachino (2008-2009); Federica Panicucci and Claudio Brachino (2009-2010); Federica Panicucci and Paolo Del Debbio (2010-2013); Federica Panicucci and Federico Novella (2013-2016); Federica Panicucci and Francesco Vecchi (2016-today)
- Opening theme: "Mattino Cinque" by Alessandro Boriani
- Country of origin: Italy
- No. of episodes: N/A

Production
- Running time: 140 minutes

Original release
- Network: Canale 5
- Release: 2008 – present

Mattino Cinque is an Italian infotainment television program. It airs every morning, from Monday to Friday, on Canale 5 and reruns on Mediaset Plus. It is produced in collaboration with Videonews.
