= Barbara D'Urso =

Italian television personality, television host, actress and writer

- Born: Maria Carmela D'Urso; 7 May 1957 (age 69); Naples, Italy
- Occupations: Television presenter; actress; author
- Years active: 1977–present
- Spouse: Michele Carfora (m. 2002; div. 2006)
- Website: www.barbaradurso.it

Maria Carmela D'Urso (born 7 May 1957), known professionally as Barbara D'Urso, is an Italian television presenter, actress and writer.

== Career ==
D'Urso was born in Naples, Campania. Her father was from Laurenzana (died in 1996), and her mother, who died when Barbara was 11, was born in Sant'Eufemia d'Aspromonte. She made her debut in 1977 in the programme Goal, alongside Diego Abatantuono, Teo Teocoli and Massimo Boldi. The following year she took part in the variety show Stryx. In 1979 she presented the programme Che combinazione broadcast on Rai 2, and the year afterward, together with Pippo Baudo, she appeared in Domenica in on Rai 1. That same year, 1980, she also made her debut as a singer, with the single Dolceamaro, which was not very successful.

In 1984 she appeared naked on the front cover of Playboy and Playmen magazines. After that, she started working for the television network of Silvio Berlusconi: she participated in a television fiction, and in 1995 she also presented Agenzia matrimoniale, but she returned to the RAI with In famiglia together with Le ragazze di piazza di Spagna, Donne di mafia and Una donna scomoda.

She received moderate notability as a result of her performance in La dottoressa Giò (1997).

Since then she has taken part in many reality shows. For three years D'Urso presented three editions of Grande Fratello, the Italian version of the Big Brother (one in 2003 and two editions in 2004). In 2005 she was the host of the Italian version of The Farm. D'Urso maintained this role for two years. In June 2005 she had a role in the TV series Ricomincio da me.

In 2006 she took part in Reality Circus, which was unsuccessful, and in 2007 with Uno due tre stalla.

In January 2008 she presented Mattino Cinque, with Claudio Brachino; this was followed in the spring of 2008 with Lo show dei record, dedicated to the Guinness World Records. In autumn 2008, she presented the prime time show Fantasia, while in the season of 2008/2009 she hosted Pomeriggio Cinque and Mattino Cinque.

In the 2009/2010 season, she left Mattino cinque and became the presenter of Domenica Cinque, a Sunday afternoon programme, and Pomeriggio 5. In the 2011 season she was replaced by Federica Panicucci.

In December 2010 she hosted the New Year Canale 5's show Capodanno cinque and, in January 2011, left Domenica Cinque to host the primetime show Stasera che sera!, which aired for only two episodes and was suspended because of extremely low ratings.

In September 2011 she hosted the program Baila!, which was also cancelled after 4 episodes due to a court sentence for plagiarism of the program Dancing with the Stars.

== Discography ==
- Dolceamaro (1980)
- Più forti di prima (2015)
- Dolceamaro with Cristiano Malgioglio

=== Singles ===
- "Dolceamaro/Se mi guardi così" (1980)

=== Music videos ===
- 2019 – Dolceamaro with Cristiano Malgioglio

Music videos by other artists with Barbara D'Urso

- 2020 – Come Adamo ed Eva: Live Milano - The Club/Fidelio Éva Henger with Sciarra

== Filmography ==
=== Films ===
Film roles showing year released, title, role played and notes
Year	Title	Role	Notes
1985	Blues metropolitano	Francesca	Feature film debut
1989	Vogliamoci troppo bene	Vanessa	
1992	Non chiamarmi Omar	Golda Fez	
1995	Mollo tutto	Bettina Giacobetti	
1995	Romanzo di un giovane povero	Student's mother	
1999	Il manoscritto di Van Hecken	Giulia	
1999	All the Moron's Men	Dr. Giorgia Basile	
2004	Per giusto omicidio	Barbara	
2018	Il vegetale	Herself	Cameo appearance
2018	Show Dogs	Daisy (voice)	Italian voice-over role
2021	Genitori vs. Influencer	Herself	Cameo appearance

=== Television ===
Television roles showing year released, title, role played and notes
Year	Title	Role	Notes
1978	Stryx	Herself/co-host	Variety show (season 1)
1979	Delitto in via Teluada	Annie	Television film
1979–1980	Che combinazione	Herself/co-host	Variety show (season 2)
1980–1981	Domenica in	Herself/co-host	Talk show (season 5); also performing
1981	La casa rossa	Gilda	Miniseries
1981	Un disco per l'estate 1981	Herself/co-host	Annual music festival
1982	Fresco fresco	Herself/host	Variety show (season 3)
1982	Giorno dopo giorno	Alice	Television film
1986	Buon Natale a tutto il mondo	Herself/host	Special
1987	La lunga notte di Biancaneve	Herself/host	Special
1987	1987 Castrocaro Music Festival	Herself/host	Annual music festival
1992	Bony	Gina	Main role; 13 episodes
1995	Per amore - Dove porta il sentimento	Herself/host	Talk show
1995	Doctor Giorgia - Una mano da stringere	Dr. Giorgia Basile	Television film
1996	Agenzia	Herself/host	Dating/Reality show
1996–1997	Mattina in famiglia	Herself/host	Talk show (season 8)
1997–2019	Doctor Giorgia	Dr. Giorgia Basile	Lead role
1998	Festival di Napoli	Herself/host	Annual music festival
1998	Le ragazze di piazza di Spagna	Dr. Giorgia Basile	Episode: "Episode 1"
2001	Via Zanardi 33	Barbara	2 episodes
2001	Donne di mafia	Giulia Marotta	Miniseries
2002	Lo zio d'America	Magda	Main role (season 1); 8 episodes
2002–2003	Ugo	Veronica	Co-lead role; 20 episodes
2003–2004	Grande Fratello	Herself/host	Reality show (seasons 3–5)
2004	Noi	Chiara Doni	Miniseries
2004	Rocco	Lucia	Television film
2004	Orgoglio	Princess Maria Pia	Main role (season 1); 13 episodes
2005–2006	La fattoria	Herself/host	Reality show (seasons 2–3)
2005–2006	Ricomincio da me	Vera Molinari	Lead role; 4 episodes
2006	Reality Circus	Herself/host	Variety show
2006–2009	Lo show dei record	Herself/host	Game show (seasons 1–2)
2007	Un due tre stalla!	Herself/host	Reality show
2008–2009	Mattino Cinque	Herself/host	Talk show (seasons 1–2)
2008–2023	Pomeriggio Cinque	Herself/host	Talk show
2009–2010	Domenica Cinque	Herself/host	Talk show (seasons 1–2)
2011	Baila!	Herself/host	Talent dance show
2012–2021	Domenica Live!	Herself/host	Talk show
2018–2019	Grande Fratello	Herself/host	Reality show (seasons 15–16)
2019–2021	Live - Non è la D'Urso	Herself/host	Talk show
2022	La Pupa e il Secchione Show	Herself/host	Reality show (season 5)
2024	Ballando con le Stelle	Herself/guest dancer	Talent show (season 19)
2025	Ballando con le Stelle	Herself/contestant	Talent show (season 20)

== Documentary ==
- Il Ribelle – Giacomo Franciosa (2010)

== Theatre ==
- Appuntamento d'amore – P. Passalacqua (1993)
- E meno male che c'è Maria – P. Garinei (1999)
- Lisistrata – Walter Manfrè (2002)
- La vedova scaltra – W. Manfrè (2007)
- Il letto ovale – G. Landi (2007–2008)

== Books ==
- Più forti di prima (Arnoldo Mondadori Editore, 2010)
- Tanto poi esce il sole (Arnoldo Mondadori Editore, 2011)
- Ma credo ancora nell'amore – Sopravvivere alle ferite del cuore (Arnoldo Mondadori Editore, 2012)
- Ecco come faccio (Arnoldo Mondadori Editore, 2013)
- La mia Contursi (Arnoldo Mondadori Editore, 2014)
