= Pomeriggio Cinque =

- Starring: Barbara D'Urso (2009–2023); Myrta Merlino (2023–2025)
- Opening theme: Smoking Pomeriggio by Alessandro Boriani (2008); Follow You Follow Me by Genesis and rearranged by the Royal Philharmonic Orchestra (2009-2021)
- Country of origin: Italy
- No. of episodes: 3119

Production
- Running time: 70 minutes weekday at 5:25 pm

Original release
- Network: Canale 5
- Release: 2008 – 2025

Pomeriggio Cinque is an Italian television entertainment news program broadcast every weekday at 5:00 p.m., on the Italian TV channel Canale 5. Barbara D'Urso has hosted the program since 2008. The program leads the ratings for its time slot (share 20% / 2 mln).

== Cast ==
- Éva Henger
- Riccardo Signoretti
- Roberto Alessi
- Daniele Interrante
- Patrizia Groppelli
- Paola Caruso
- Biagio D'Anelli
