= Musgum =

Musgum may refer to:

- Musgum people
- Musgum dwelling units
- Musgu language
