= Beehive house =

Building made from a circle of stones topped with a domed roof

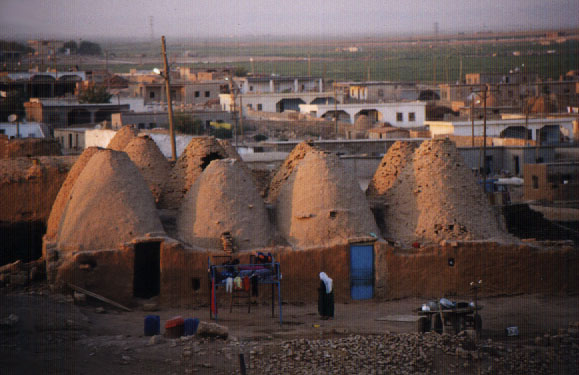
Village of beehive houses in Harran, Turkey.

A beehive house is a building made from a circle of stones or mud topped with a cone-shaped roof. The name comes from the similarity in shape to a straw beehive.

== Occurrences ==
The ancient Bantu used this type of house, which was made with mud, poles, and cow dung. Early European settlers in the Karoo region of South Africa built similar structures known as corbelled houses. These white-washed structures are described as coursed rubble on a circular plan, with each successive course smaller and slightly corbelled over the course below so that a conical shape is achieved as each course is completed.

Beehive houses are some of the oldest known structures in Ireland and Scotland,. Beehive houses have also been built in the Italian Peninsula, with some still being built as late as the 19th century in Apulia (south-eastern Italy). and going by the name of trulli.

A town called Harran in Turkey is also the location of houses that mimic the beehive architecture and they are still in existence today. The structures, which are clustered together like a termite colony, were said to have been constructed as windowless cones because it is the only way to achieve a roof without timber.

== Gallery ==
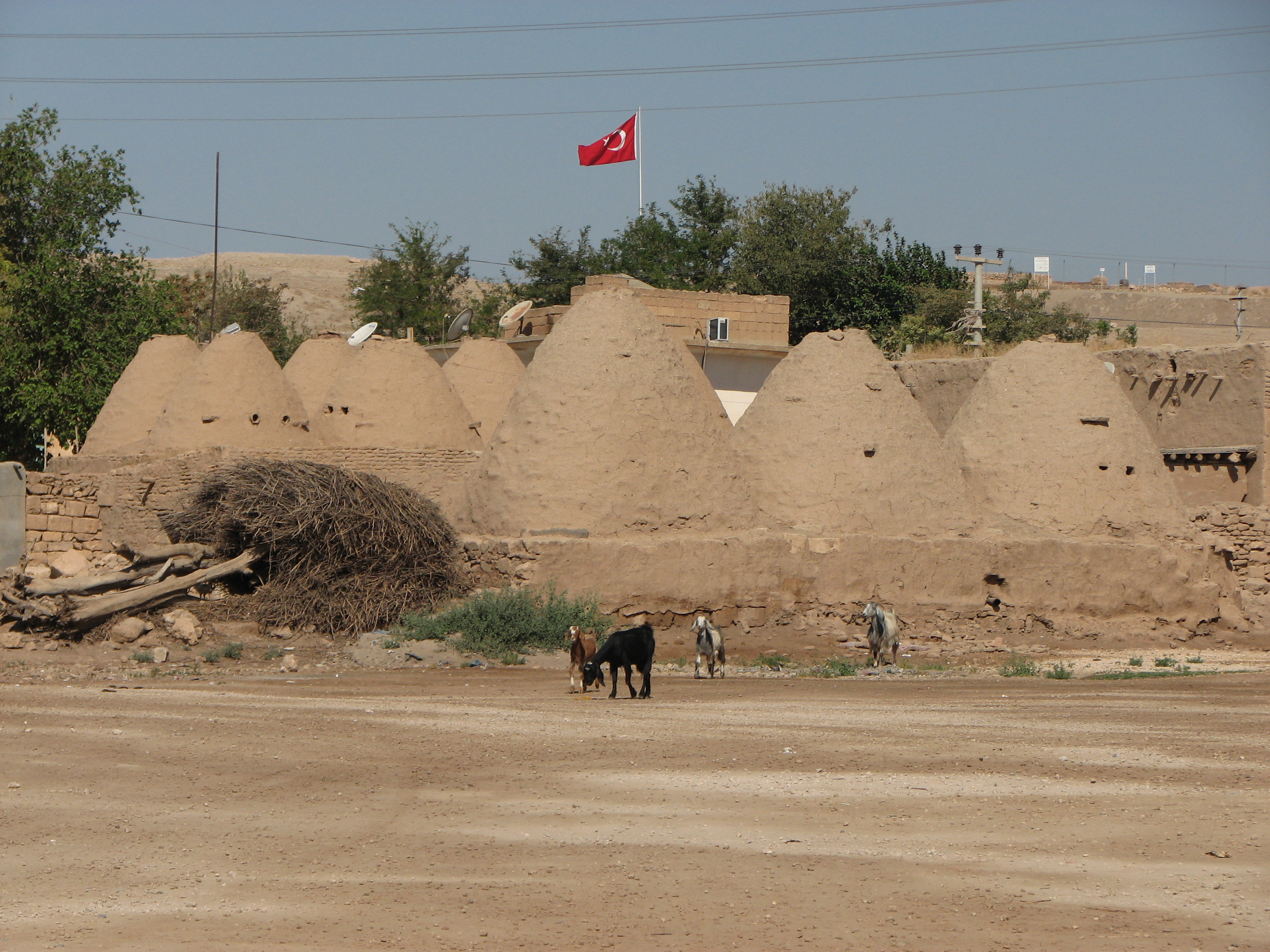
Another view of beehive houses in Harran.

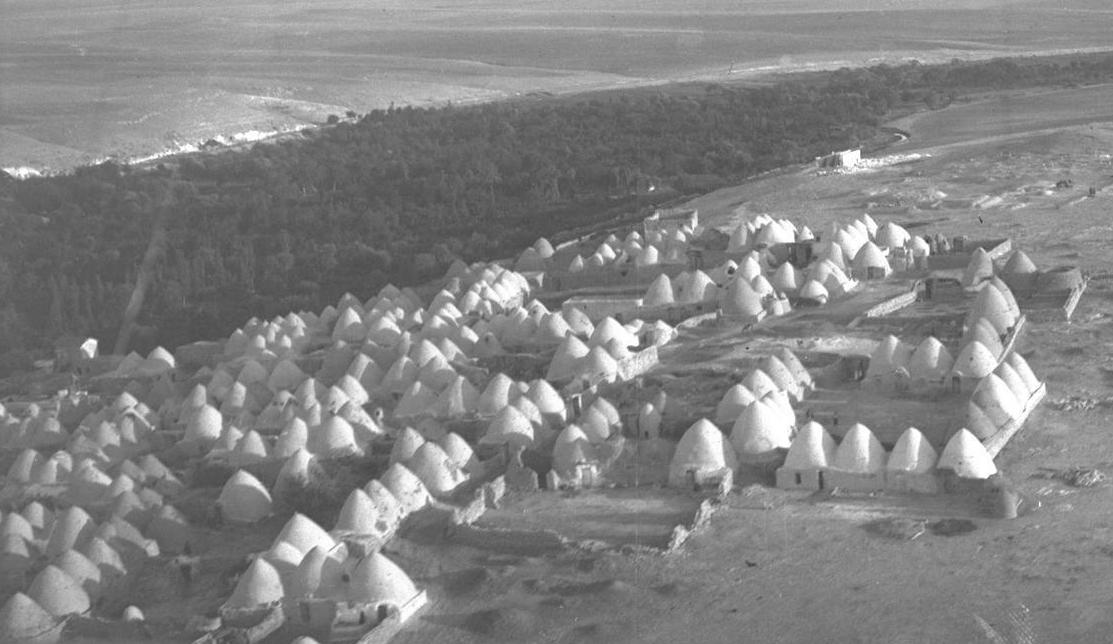
Village of beehive houses near Aleppo, Syria, in 1927

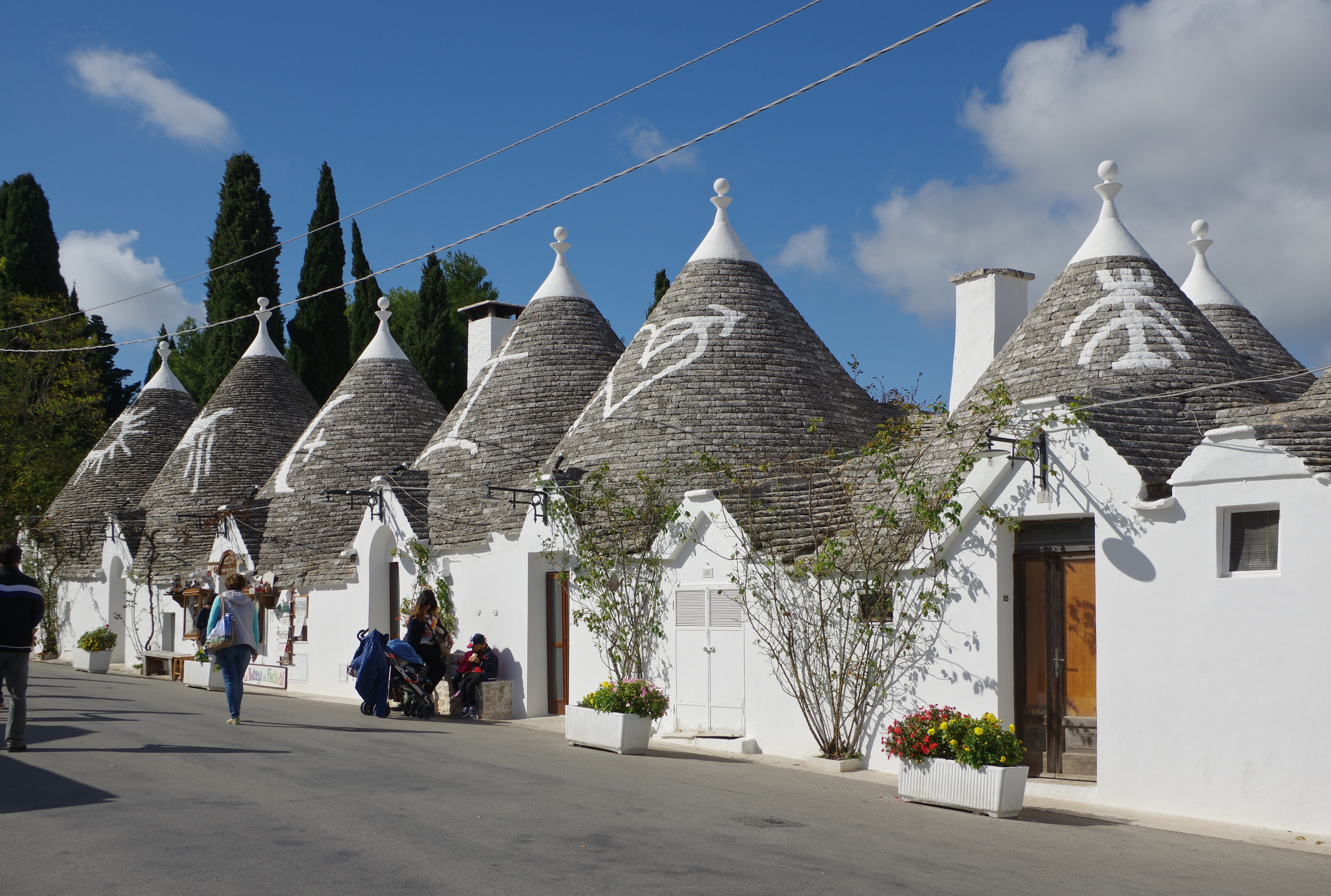
Row of trullo beehive houses in Monte Pertica street in Alberobello, Bari Province, Italy.

== See also ==
- Beehive tomb
- Clochán, Irish stone huts, often beehive shaped
- Musgum mud huts, huts of the Musgum people in Cameroon
- Nuraghe, large, round, neolithic, stone structures in Sardinia
- Trullo, a southern Italian and northern Israel type of beehive house
- Dovecote also called doocot (Scots), buildings to house doves, some are beehive shaped, stone structures
- Early and simple domes
