= Tomba della Mula =

Tomb in Sesto Fiorentino, Italy

Coordinates: 43°49′42.56″N 11°12′51.63″E

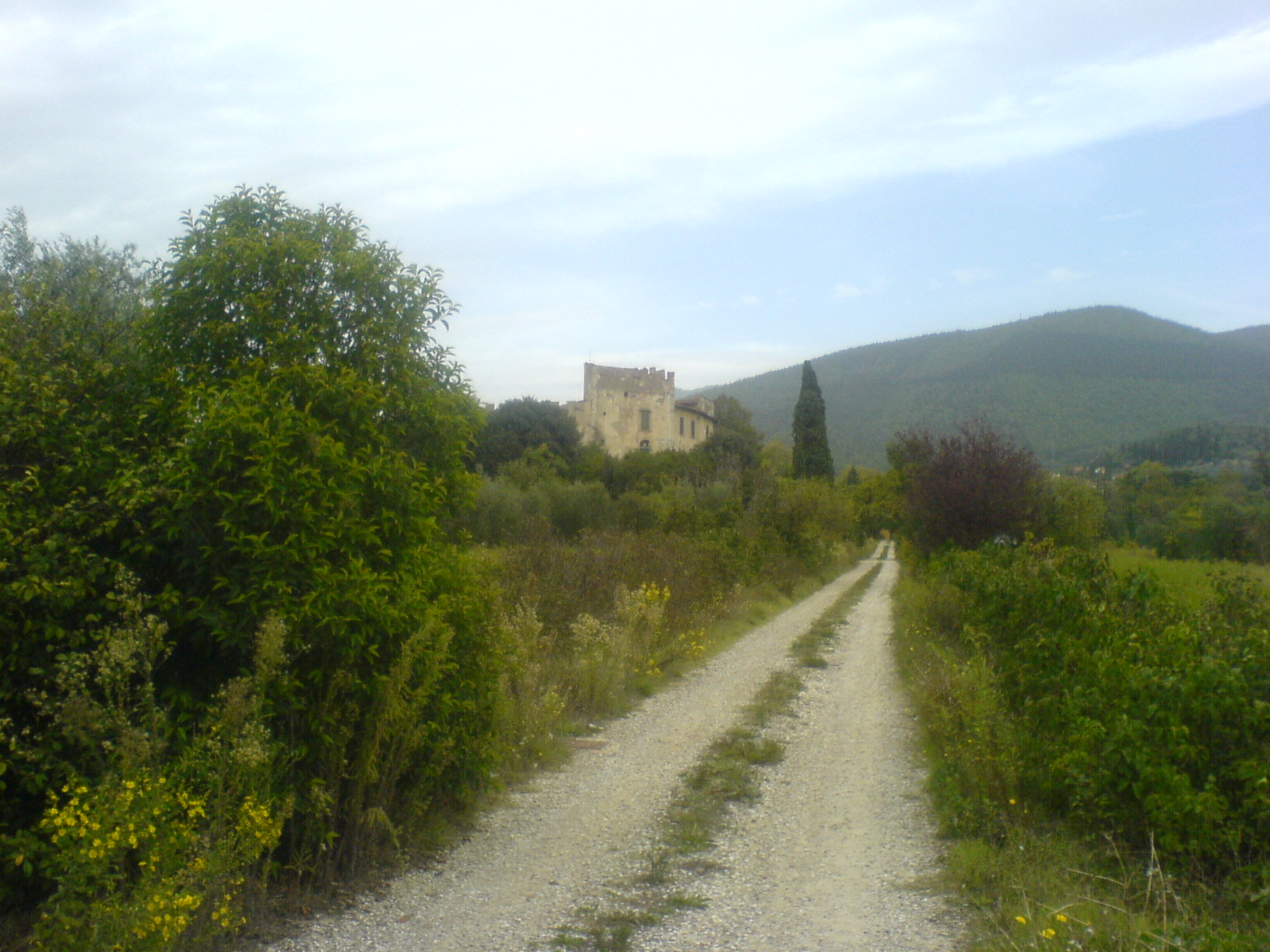
Tomba della Mula.

The Tomba della Mula (Italian: "Tomb of the She-Mule") is a beehive tomb in Sesto Fiorentino, near Florence, Central Italy, dating to the 7th century BC.

The name derives from an ancient legend, according to which a golden she-mule had been buried in the fields around Florence. It has been known since the 15th century, and is the largest pre-Roman Italic dome tomb known in Italy. The structure has a diameter of some 9 m (30 ft) and contains vaulted roofs. The tomb was declared a national monument in 1905.

== See also ==
- Early and simple domes
