= Early and simple domes =

Cultures from pre-history to the modern era constructed early and simple domes using local materials. Although it is not known when or where the first dome was created, sporadic examples of early domed structures have been discovered as far back as the Stone Age. The first examples may not have survived due to the use of perishable materials like saplings, reeds, or timbers covered with thatch, turf, or skins, but similar forms have been documented more recently in vernacular architecture around the world. Comparable historical domes built with such materials include Central Asian felt tents, Thule whalebone dwellings, Inuit igloos, Native American wigwams and Anasazi roofs, and various African grass, leaf, wattle and daub, and thin clay domes.

Examples built with more lasting materials have been found from the Neolithic period and Chalcolithic periods, with sites in the ancient Near East showing small corbelled or mudbrick domes over round houses and granaries. In the Bronze Age, corbelled stone "beehive" tombs and other structures appear from Egypt and Nubia through Oman, Crete, Sardinia, and Mycenaean Greece. Iron Age and later early domes include Etruscan, Hellenistic, Achaemenid, and Han-dynasty Chinese examples. Nineteenth-century beehive houses in Turkey and the trulli of Italy belong to the same family of techniques.

The historical path from the earliest examples to later monumental masonry and concrete domes remains poorly documented. That similar forms appear across many cultures could reflect either a common source or multiple independent traditions. The dome form encloses a given volume with less material and surface area relative to rectilinear techniques and so often has favorable thermal properties, which may explain why some Indigenous peoples around the world produce similar structures today.

== Early and indigenous domes ==
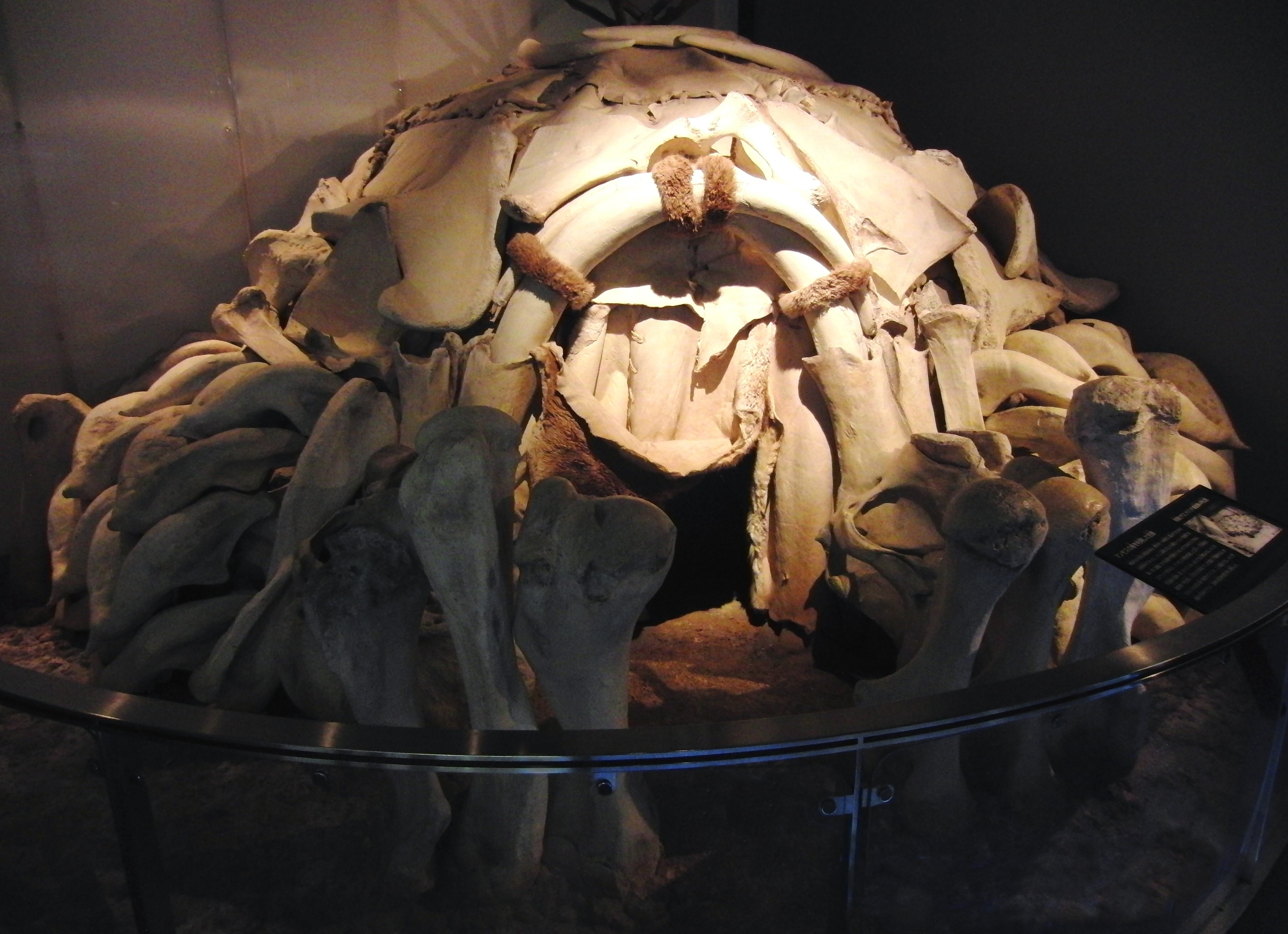
Mezhirich mammoth hut reconstruction.

The earliest domes were likely domed huts made from saplings, reeds, or timbers and covered with thatch, turf, or skins. Materials may have transitioned to rammed earth, mud-brick, or more durable stone as a result of local conditions. The earliest discovered remains of domed constructions may be four small dwellings made of Mammoth tusks and bones. The first was found by a farmer in Mezhirich, Ukraine, in 1965 while he was digging in his cellar and archaeologists unearthed three more. They date from 19,280–11,700 BC.

The historical development from structures like these to more sophisticated domes is not well documented. That the dome was known to early Mesopotamia may explain the existence of domes in both China and the West in the first millennium BC. Another explanation, however, is that the use of the dome shape in construction did not have a single point of origin and was common in virtually all cultures long before domes were constructed with enduring materials. Even when built from mud-brick or stone, remains of old buildings are typically limited to the lower walls only. In exceptional circumstances, the remains of a collapsed roof can be preserved in a building's interior, but detecting this depends on careful observation during excavations. As a result, determining whether a building originally had a domed roof usually depends on interpretation of the remaining ground plan. Circular-plan buildings may have had flat roofs, domes, or conical roofs, determined by a number of environmental and social factors. Interior post holes may indicate the use of flat or conical roofs, while smaller diameters, thicker walls, or a lack of wood in the region may suggest the use of domes. There is evidence that building function and social factors could also play a role in roofing type and a variety of types may have been used contemporaneously at the same location.

Sylvester Baxter wrote that domes were evidently of Persian origin, with those early Persian domes being thought by Pascal Coste to have been derived from hemispherical bent-pole hide tents of the nomadic Iliate tribe of Turkmens near the Aral Sea, and thought by Frederic Edwin Church to have been derived from an earlier use of brick dome-shaped huts like those he had seen in Turkey.

Turkic and Mongolian nomads have used domed tents covered in felt for at least a thousand years in central Asia, and they were used to the early 1900s from Anatolia to Mongolia. Yakut tents in the Sakha Republic, Russia, form a pointed dome shape.

Pre-Incan chullpas at Sillustani, Peru, included single and superposed corbelled dome chambers.

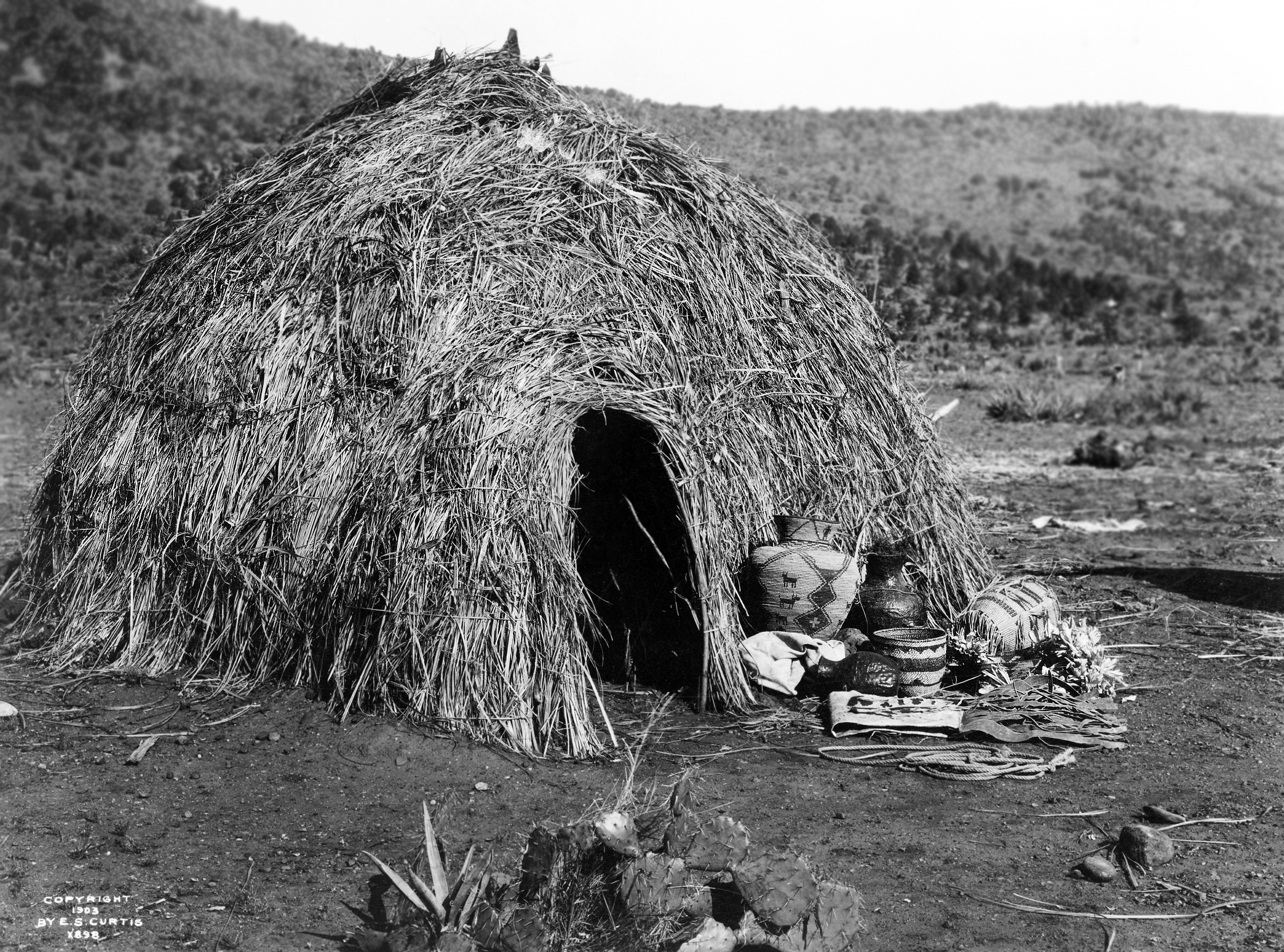
1903 photo of an Apache wigwam.

Semi-subterranean dwellings of the Thule people, ancestors of the Inuit who were established in the Canadian Arctic by 1300 AD, were made of whalebone frames lashed together with hide straps in a parabolic dome shape covered with hides and blocks of sod and snow. The igloo, a shelter built from blocks of ice in a spiral, was used by the Inuit. The wigwam was made by Native Americans and covered with hides or bark. A kind of corbelled dome using lengths of wood was used by the Anasazi to cover some kivas between 900 and 1250. A similar technique is used in Afghanistan.

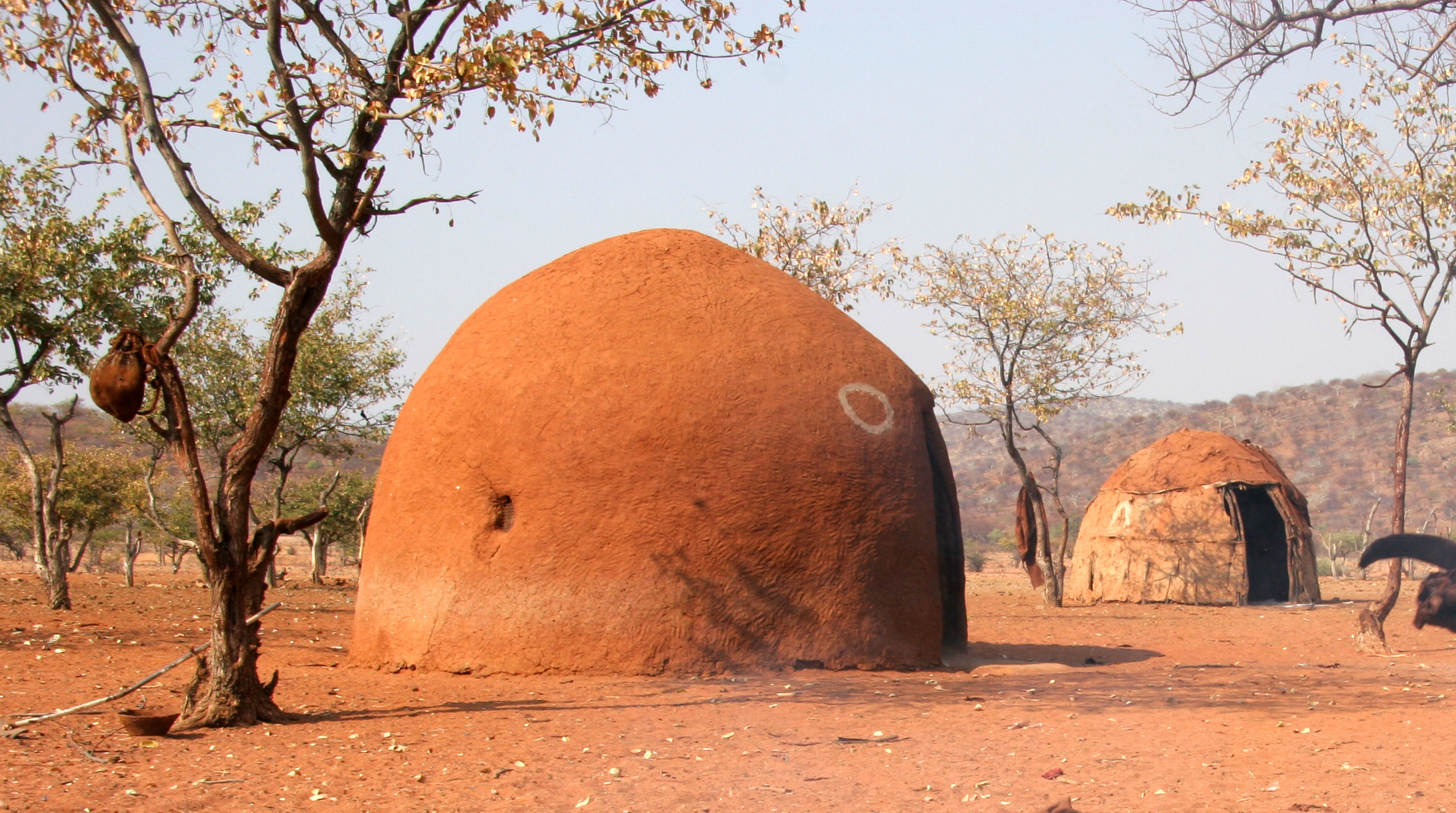
Domed wattle and daub shelters made by the Himba.

In South Africa, there are accounts as far back at 1727 describing mobile domed shelters about 4.2 meters wide made by Khoi nomads as well as grass houses among forager communities in either a conical or dome form, which appear to have been the dominant type of housing by 1800 among communities in the grass-rich areas east of the Drakensberg escarpment. A later development of the grass dome house were the cone-on-cylinder and dome-on-cylinder houses in KwaZulu-Natal. A traditional dome house is used by the Xhosa people as a temporary male initiation shelter that is then burned. The Efé people of central Africa construct similar structures, using leaves as shingles. The Himba people of Namibia construct "desert igloos" of wattle and daub for use as temporary shelters at seasonal cattle camps, and as permanent homes by the poor. Extraordinarily thin domes of sun-baked clay 6.1 metres (20 ft) in diameter, 9.1 metres (30 ft) high, and nearly parabolic in curve, are known from Cameroon. In Namibia and Mali, domes are made with ribs of flexible branches either meeting in the center or interwoven orthogonally. A traditional reinforced mud dome technique by the Hausa of northern Nigeria uses mud, palmwood, and cement plaster to create domes formed by different configurations of half-arches with permanent timber formwork between them, all covered in a daub of mud and cement.

Domes made with loam are found in Europe, Asia, and Africa, almost always using mud-bricks or adobes. In developing countries, domes are often less expensive alternatives to flat or sloped-roofed construction because they use less material to enclose a given volume and provide a lower rate of heat transfer due to the reduced surface area. A way of building them without centering called the Persian dome technique has been used for centuries in Afghanistan. Traditional farming shelters with clay adobe true domes and corbelled domes are found in the Tierra de Campos region of Spain, which has few trees. Bordering regions with available limestone combined that with clay adobe elements, but the huts in the rest of the peninsula favored stone corbelled domes. Earthen brick domes bonded with earthen mortar in villages near Aleppo, Syria, are distinguished from similar corbelled domes known since antiquity in the Mediterranean region, such as those of Italy, Sardinia, Spain, France, North Africa, and the Near East, by being closer to the funicular shape for a dome, having thinner structures, laying the bricks in a continuous spiral, and behaving like a monolithic material. Although descended from a longer tradition, the examples of clay brick beehive domes at Harran, Turkey, have been dated to the 19th century AD, as are the dry stone trulli of Italy.

The trulli of Italy are typically made of a structural inner layer of corbelled stones in a pointed dome shape, an outer conical layer of corbelled stones angled away from the peak to facilitate water runoff, and a middle fill layer. An example in Alberobello spans 3.84 meters over "a well-clamped squared basement made of irregular stones" and the interior sides of the stones are cut to create a smooth dome surface. The inner structural layer of the dome is about 0.26 meters thick.

== Neolithic and Chalcolithic ==
Small domes in corbelled stone or brick over round-plan houses go back to the Neolithic period in the ancient Near East, and served as dwellings for poorer people throughout the prehistoric period, but domes did not play an important role in monumental architecture.

The discoveries of seal impressions in the ancient site of Chogha Mish (c. 6800 to 3000 BC), located in the Susiana plains of Iran, in the vicinity of the modern city of Dezful in Khuzestan province, show the extensive use of dome structures in mud-brick and adobe buildings, likely granaries.

Other examples of mud-brick buildings that also seemed to employ the "true" dome technique have been excavated at Tell Arpachiyah, a Mesopotamian site of the Halaf (c. 6100 to 5400 BC) and Ubaid (c. 5300 to 4000 BC) cultures. Excavations at Chagar Bazar have uncovered several circular-plan Halaf structures with upper rows of mud-bricks inclining toward the center, suggesting corbelled domes. One six-meter-wide circular-plan structure was found to have been destroyed by fire with its collapsed flat roof preserved in the interior. It appears to have had a half-corbelled dome finished with a flat roof. There may have been domed buildings at Tell Arpachiyah (6000-5700 BC) and Yarim Tepe II (c. 6th millennium BC), but the evidence has been disputed.

In the South Caucasus, there may have been domed buildings at Gadachrili Gora (5970-5300 BC) and Göy-Tepe (5650-5460 BC). At Gadachrili Gora, almost complete domes were preserved. At nearby Shulaveris Gora, buildings preserved up to 2 meters in height indicated domes, although this has been disputed.

== Bronze Age ==
Ancient stone corbelled domes have been found from the Middle East to Western Europe. Corbelled beehive domes were used as granaries in Ancient Egypt from the first dynasty, in mastaba tombs of the Old Kingdom, as pressure-relieving devices in private brick pyramids of the New Kingdom, and as kilns and cellars. They have been found in brick and in stone. The mastaba tombs of Seneb and of Neferi are examples. A model of a 10th dynasty house has also been found in Rifeh showing the tops of three domes just emerging through the terraced roof. Above-ground tombs made of corbelled stone domes have been found in the fourth cataract region of Nubia with dates beginning in the second millennium BC. The "Nubian dome" technique of using a movable guide to lay courses of a spherical dome dates back thousands of years in Upper Egypt.

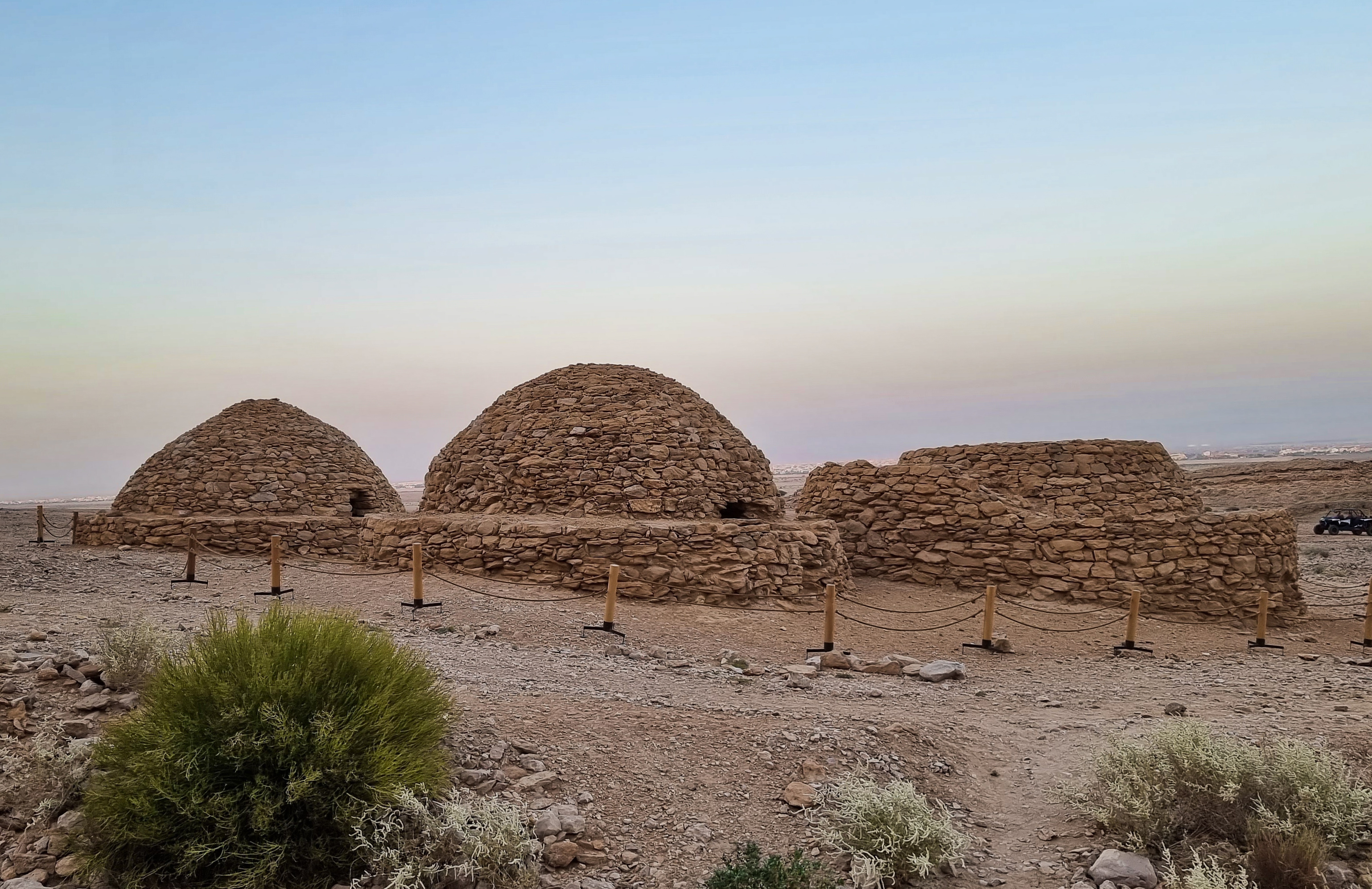
Hafit stone tombs.

In an area straddling the borders between Oman, UAE, and Bahrain, stone beehive tombs built above ground called "Hafit graves", or "Mezyat graves", date to the Hafit period between 3200 and 2700 BC.

Early stone corbelled dome examples include a prehistoric settlement at Los Millares in Spain, the mid-third millennium B.C. Hypogeum of Hal Saflieni in Malta, and the Dolmen de l’Ile longue in France.

At the Sumerian Royal Cemetery of Ur, a "complete rubble dome built over a timber centring" was found among the chambers of the tombs for Meskalamdug and Puabi, dating to around 2500 BC. Set in mud mortar, it was a "true dome with pendentives rounding off the angles of the square chamber." Other small domes can be inferred from the remaining ground plans, such as one in the courtyard of Ur-Nammu's ziggurat, and in later shrines and temples of the 14th century BC. Some monumental Mesopotamian buildings of the Kassite period are thought to have had brick domes, but the issue is unsettled due to insufficient evidence in what has survived of these structures. Excavations at Tell al-Rimah have revealed pitched-brick domical vaults from about 2000 BC. A 4-meter circular structure dating to around the 18th century BC was found at Chagar Bazar partly preserved up to the closing rows of its unfired mud-brick corbelled dome. It may have been a kiln or furnace.

Examples on the Mediterranean island of Sardinia have been dated to 2500 BC. The nuraghe built between the 17th century BC and the 5th century BC include stone corbelled domes, some of which were covered by a flat roof or terrace. The largest, Nuraghe Is Paras from the 15th century BC, is 11.8 meters tall and spans 6.4 meters.

In the Aegean, circular domed buildings made of stone appear as early as the end of the third millennium BC, used almost exclusively for funerary functions.

Minoan free-standing tombs about 4 to 13 meters in diameter are partially preserved on the Messara Plain of Crete. Only the lowest 3 or 4 meters remain standing of structures that may have risen up to 12 meters, but they are generally agreed to have been domed and provide a developmental link between Neolithic round houses and the circular tombs of the Bronze Age. They are dated after the round houses of Chalcolithic western Cyprus and before the Mycenaean "tholoi". Eight round buildings at the palace of Malia may have been domed storage spaces, although they were built aboveground. They do not appear to have been tombs.

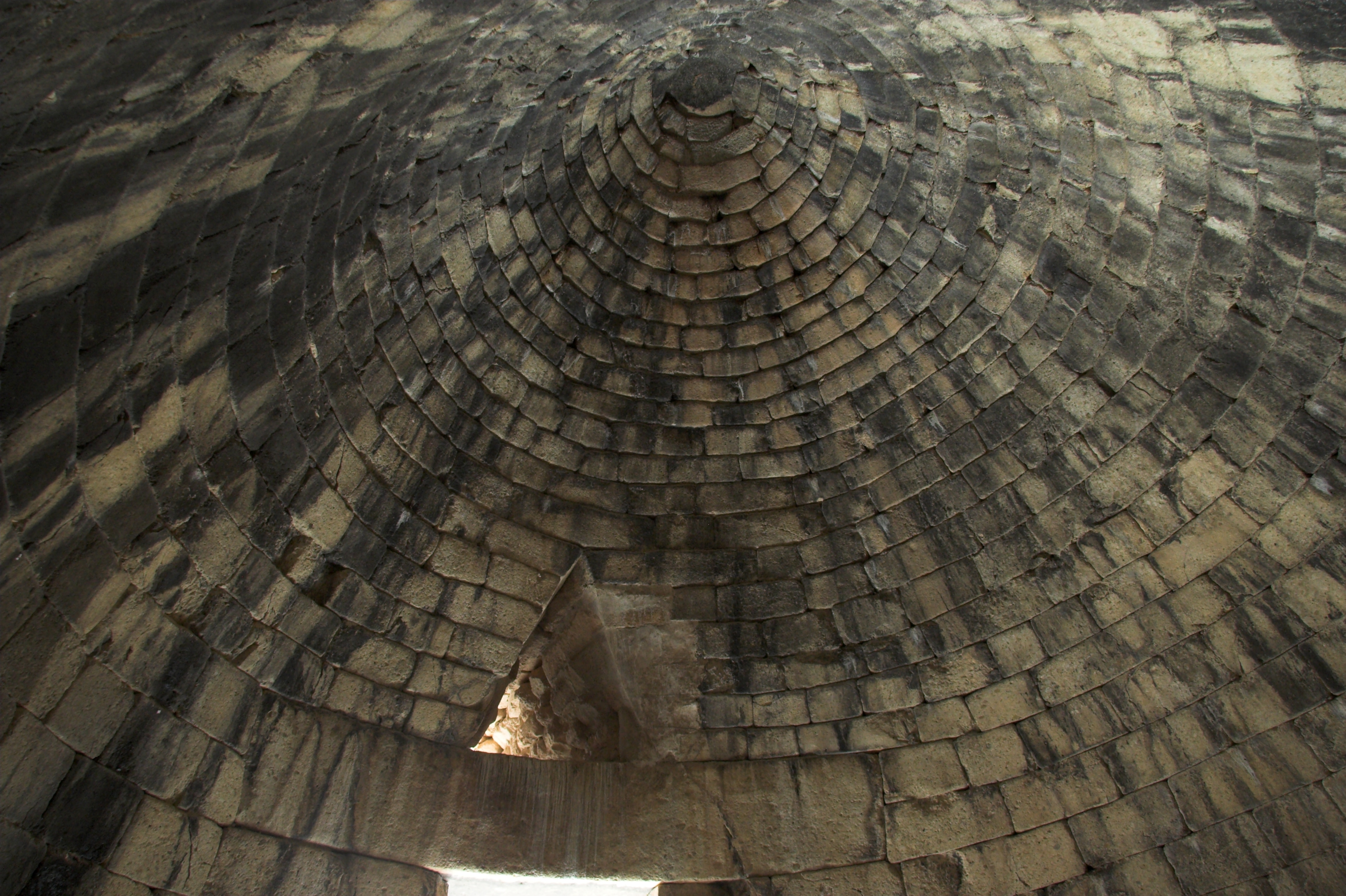
The so-called Treasury of Atreus in Mycenae, Greece.

Underground tombs called "treasuries", a term used by Pausanias for the grave of a hero, flourished in Mycenaean Greece between 1500 BC and 1300 BC, increasing in diameter from about 8 meters to about 14 meters in that time. Almost 200 have been discovered. They share stone construction, a beehive shape, and an inside diameter equal to the height. Stone courses above the doorway openings may have an inward inclination to increase the inward thrust from surrounding soil used to stabilize the structure. Smaller scale examples from this time can also be found in other parts of southern and western Europe.

The "Treasury of Atreus", a large Mycenaean tomb covered with a mound of earth, dates to around 1330 BC. It is about 15 meters in diameter and one of several tholos tombs with corbelled domes. Others include the "Treasury of Clytemnestra" and the "Treasury of Minyas". The tombs of Clytemnestra (13.4 meters in diameter), Lion (14 meters in diameter), and Atreus (14.6 meters in diameter) use dry masonry ashlar limestone and conglomerate blocks and are the only three at Mycenae that are monumental in size. The size and quality of the stonework, in particular the inner lintel stone in the Atreus tomb carved to match the double curvature of the dome's inner surface, have led to speculation that these were the tombs of royalty. The Atreus inner lintel stone was almost eight meters long, five meters wide, and weighed more than 120 tons. It was the heaviest stone block used in Greek history.

== Iron Age ==
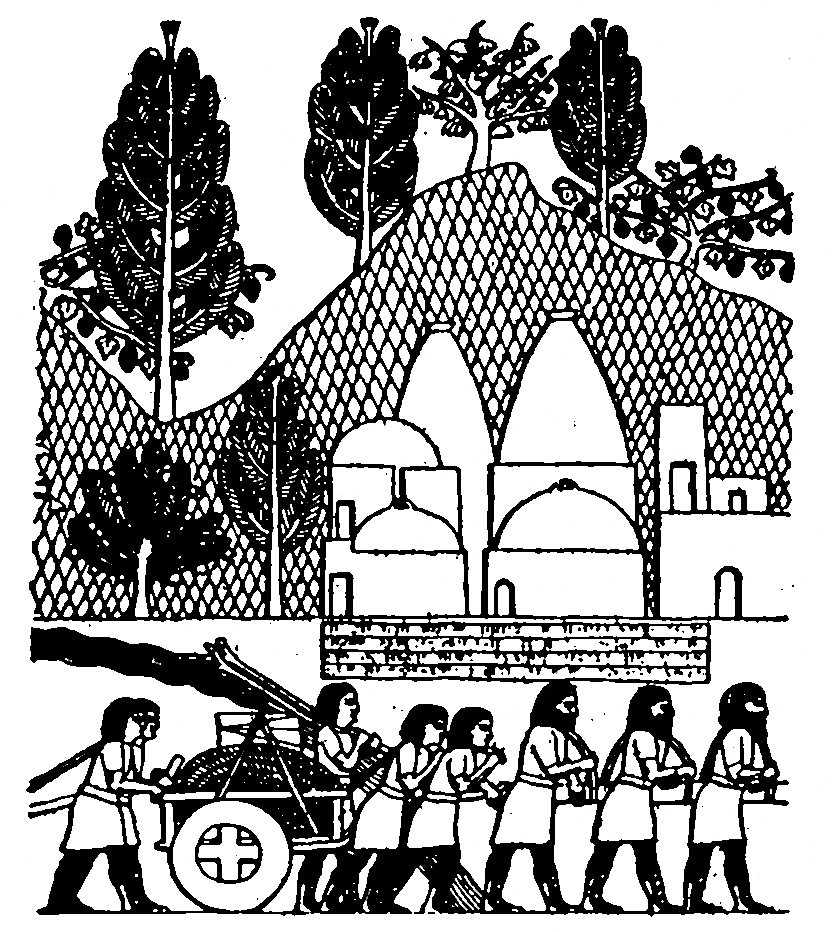
Drawing of an Assyrian bas-relief from Nimrud.

A Neo-Assyrian bas-relief from Kuyunjik depicts domed buildings, although remains of such a structure in that ancient city have yet to be identified, perhaps due to the impermanent nature of sun-dried mudbrick construction. However, because the relief depicts the Assyrian overland transport of a carved stone statue, the background buildings most likely refer to a foreign village, such as those at the foothills of the Lebanese mountains. The relief dates to the 8th century BC, while the use of domical structures in the Syrian region may go back as far as the fourth millennium BC. The piece depicting the beehive domes, SWPS 150a (referring to the identifier in 1998 publication Sculptures from the Southwest Palace of Sennacherib at Nineveh; possibly slab 61), was documented in a drawing as part of the excavation by Austen Henry Layard but was not sent to London, likely due to its state of damage.

Corbelled beehive tombs over square chambers appear in Thrace, the Crimea, and in Etruria in the first millennium BC. Corbelling in the corners created pendentives.

A series of Etruscan chamber tombs at Populonia have been dated from the late 9th century to the 8th century BC with corbelled domes made of limestone slabs. They appear to mirror royal houses. Built between the eighth century and the first century BC, particularly around Tarquinia and Cerveteri, thousands of examples of Etruscan domed tombs in Italy have been identified. The Etruscan "Tomb of the Diavolino" at Vetulonia is an example.

Beginning in the middle of the 7th century BC, possibly due to emigration of peoples from the Levant because of the conquests of Sargon II, square-plan tomb chambers were used with corbeled domes supported from pendentive-like features at the corners. Although a central pillar was used to support the closing slab of the dome, it was not structurally necessary and may have been intended to imitate a central pole in Etruscan huts. The example of the Tomb of Pietrera in Vetulonia collapse a few decades after its construction in the mid-7th century BC and a new tomb was constructed at a higher level at the site without a central pillar. The Tomba della Mula appears to have been the earliest example in which the dome starts from the floor level, reaches a height approximately equal to the diameter, and does not have a central pillar.

Wooden domes were evidently used in Etruria on the Italian peninsula from the Archaic period. Reproductions were preserved as rock-cut Etruscan tombs produced until the Roman Imperial period, and paintings at Pompeii show examples of them in the third style and later.

== Antiquity before the Roman Empire ==
Wooden domes may also have been used in ancient Greece, over buildings such as the Tholos of Epidaurus, which is typically depicted with a shallow conical roof. Evidence for such wooden domes over round buildings in ancient Greece, if they existed, has not survived and the issue is much debated. The heroon at Stymphalos has been dated to the late Classical or early Hellenistic period and has a round room preceded by a long rectilinear porch. Its layout might have been copied from Mycenaean tholos tombs and because it was still in use in the Roman period it has been suggested as an inspiration or precedent for the Pantheon in Rome.

Although they had brick and stone palaces, the kings of Achaemenid Persia held audiences and festivals in domical tents derived from the nomadic traditions of central Asia. They were likely similar to the later tents of the Mongol Khans. Called "Heavens", the tents emphasized the cosmic significance of the divine ruler. They were adopted by Alexander the Great after his conquest of the empire, and the domed baldachin of Roman and Byzantine practice was presumably inspired by this association.

Simple domical mausoleums existed in the Hellenistic period. The possible use of domed ceilings in the architecture of Ptolemaic Egypt is suggested by rock-cut tombs in Alexandria and by a poem from a third century BC papyrus that references a fountain niche covered with a semi-dome.

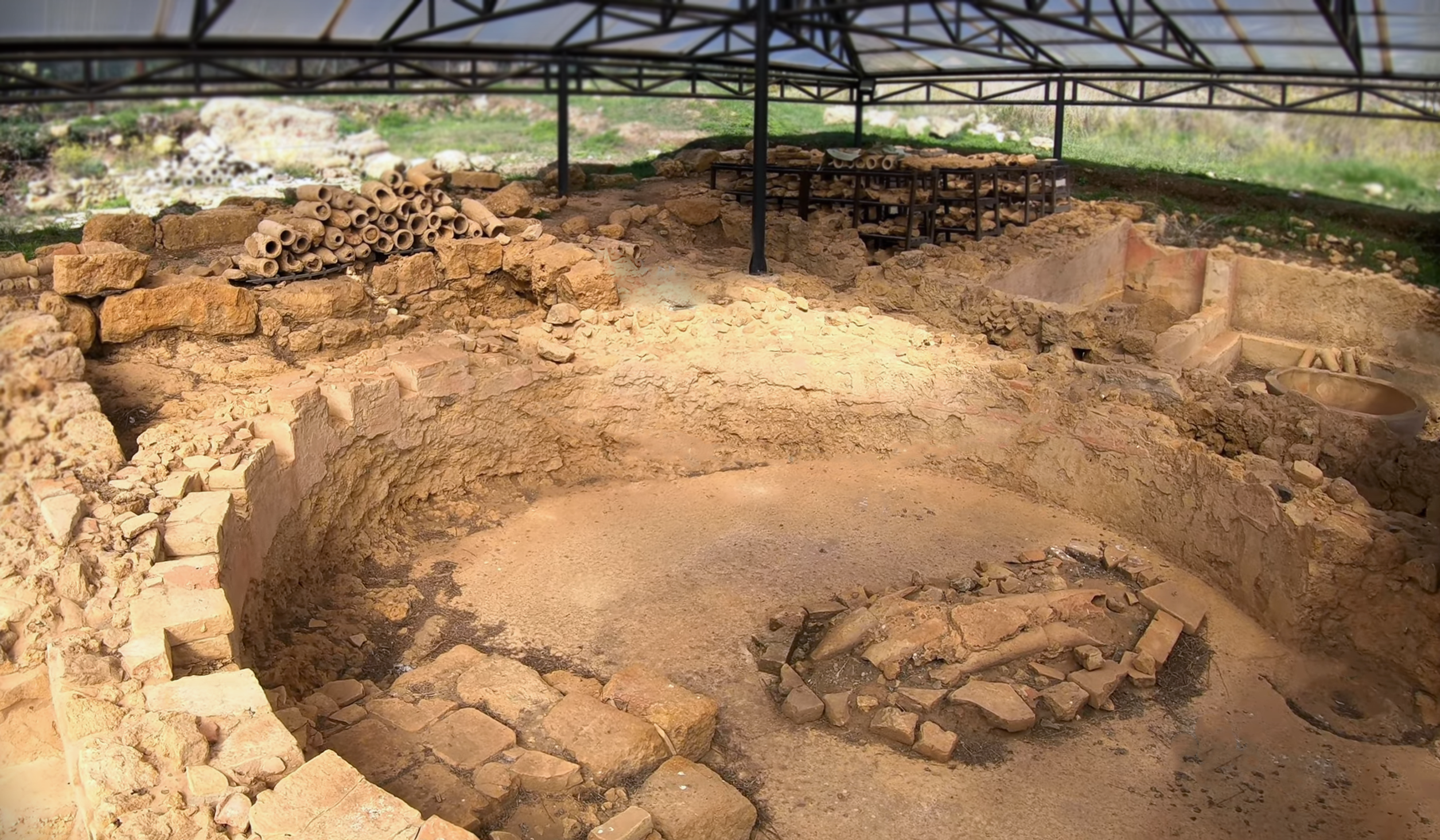
Ruins of the North Baths at Morgantina, Sicily.

The earliest physical evidence of a Hellenistic dome is at the North Baths of Morgantina in Sicily, dated to the mid third century BC under Hieron II. The dome measured 5.75 metres in diameter over the circular hot room of the baths. It was made of terracotta tubes partially inserted into each other and arranged by parallel arches into a hemispherical shape that was then completely covered with mortar on the inside and outside surfaces. Iron pins were used to connect some of the tubes horizontally. It is also the earliest known example of this technique of tubular vault construction. A Hellenistic bathing complex in nearby Syracuse may also have used domes like these to cover its circular rooms. The domes are contemporaneous with Archimedes, and the technique of their construction may be related to his method of analyzing spheres as a series of parallel truncated cone segments. The ship Syracusia was built for Hieron II with a domed library, and construction of the ship was overseen by Archimedes.

Vaulting tubes were used in a 3-meter-wide bath dome at Cabrera de Mar near Barcelona, dated to the middle of the 2nd-century B.C. The tubes were shaped similarly to those at Morgantina and also used iron pins, but were only about 22 centimeters long and the tubes with pins included interior transverse tubes for them.

In the city of Pergamon, there are remains of stone apsidal semi-domes from the second century BC. The earliest evidence for dressed stone domes with voussoirs comes from the first century BC in the region of Palestine, Syria, and southern Anatolia, the "heartland of Oriental Hellenism". A stone pendentive dome is known from a first century BC bath in Petra.

The Scythians built domed tombs, as did some Germanic tribes in a paraboloid shape. In the Saar basin of the Germanic north of Europe, the domical shape was used in wooden construction over houses, tombs, temples, and city towers, and was translated into masonry construction only after the beginning of Roman rule.

== Imperial China ==
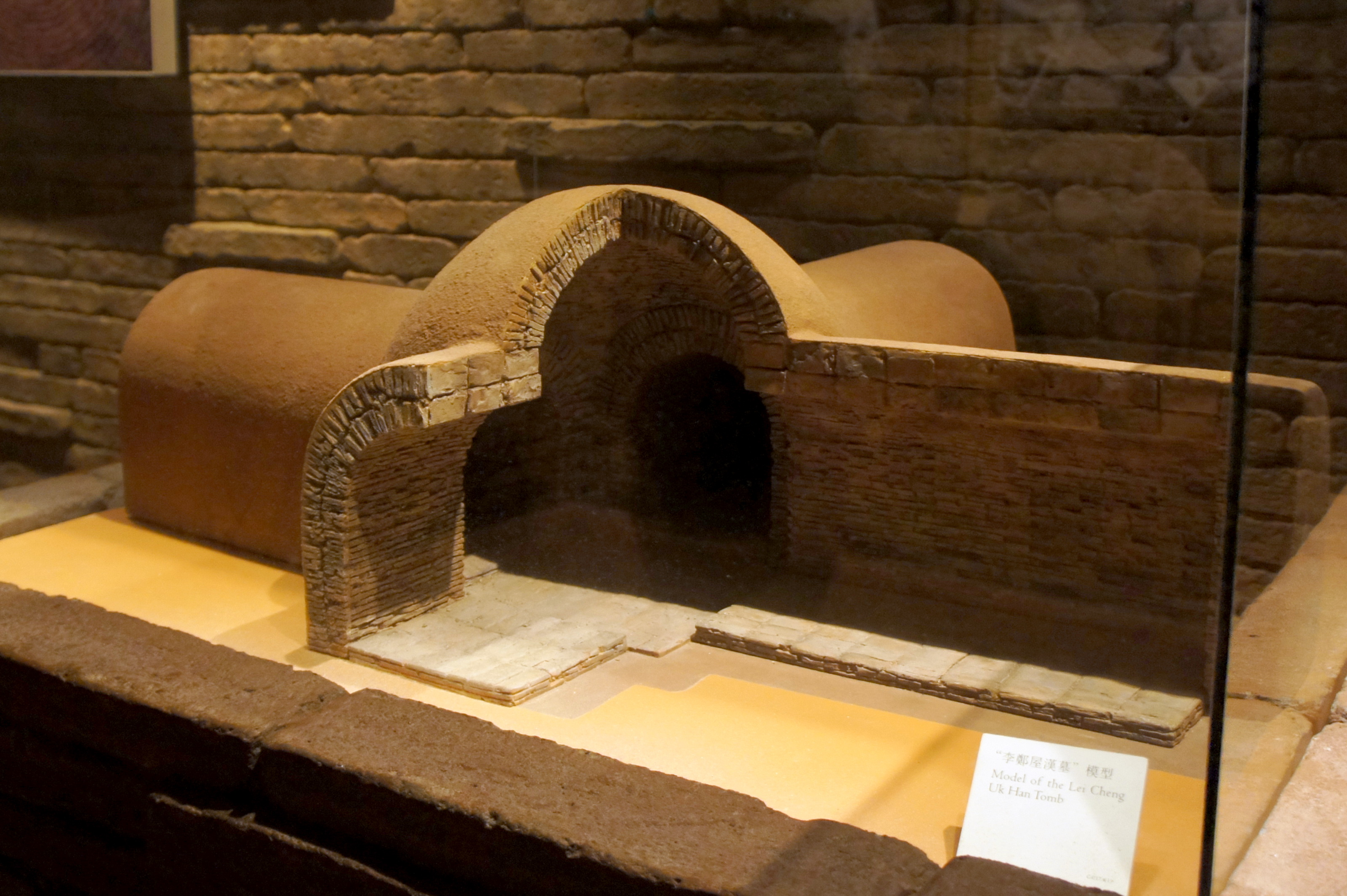
Model of the Lei Cheng Uk Han Tomb of Hong Kong, dated to the Eastern Han dynasty (25–220 AD).

In ancient Chinese architecture, the use of brick vaults and domes in aboveground structures is unknown, and traditional Chinese architecture only rarely used corbelled domes in temples and tombs.

The tomb of the first emperor has not yet been excavated, but "reportedly featured a large chart of the heavens painted on its domed vault". Underground tombs dating to the Han dynasty (202 BC – 220 AD) have been discovered and often feature archways, vaulted chambers and domed ceilings. These underground vaults and domes did not require buttress supports since they were held in place by earthen pits. The continued use of domed ceilings in underground tomb architecture can be seen at sites such as the Baisha Tomb near Gongyi, Henan province, dated to the Song dynasty (960–1279 AD), which features two chambers with conical ceilings.

A square-and-diamond pattern used in post-and-lintel ceilings has been called a laternendecke or "lantern ceiling" and is also related to the later Chinese octagonal wooden domes that create an eight-sided cone on a square base.

== Bibliography ==
- Jebel Hafit Tombs, Abu Dhabi Authority for Culture and Heritage (ADACH), 2012, archived from the original on March 15, 2012
- "Tombs cast light on nation's origins", The National, Abu Dhabi Media, February 20, 2010
- Andrews, P. A. (1973), "The White House of Khurasan: The Felt Tents of the Iranian Yomut and Gökleñ", Iran, 11, Taylor & Francis, Ltd.: 93–110, doi:10.2307/4300487, JSTOR 4300487
- Aradeon, Susan B. (1991). "Maximizing Mud: Lofty Reinforced-Mud Domes Built with the Assistance of Supernatural Powers in Hausaland". Paideuma: Mitteilungen zur Kulturkunde. 37. Frobenius Institute: 205–221. JSTOR 40341631.
- Arnold, Dieter (2003), "Cupola", in Strudwick, Helen; Strudwick, Nigel (eds.), The Encyclopaedia of Ancient Egyptian Architecture, New York, NY: I.B.Tauris & Co. Ltd., pp. 62–63
- Bardill, Jonathan (2008). "Chapter II.7.1: Building Materials and Techniques". In Jeffreys, Elizabeth; Haldon, John; Cormack, Robin (eds.). The Oxford Handbook of Byzantine Studies. Oxford, England: Oxford University Press. ISBN 978-0-19-925246-6.
- Baudouin, Emmanuel; Decaix, Alexia; Brunacci, Emmanuela; Guliyev, Farhad; Palumbi, Giulio (2023). "Domed or flat? The case study of Building 21 at Kiçik Tepe (Middle Kura Valley, Azerbaijan) and a reconsideration of the Neolithic roofing architecture in the South Caucasus". Paléorient. Revue pluridisciplinaire de préhistoire et de protohistoire de l’Asie du Sud-Ouest et de l’Asie centrale. 48 (2): 65–90. doi:10.4000/paleorient.2129.
- Baxter, Sylvester (1902). Spanish-colonial Architecture in Mexico. Vol. 1 (Gómez de Mora ed.). Boston, MA: J. B. Millet. p. 236.
- Castex, Jean (2008). Architecture of Italy. Reference Guides to National Architecture. Westport, CT: Greenwood Press. ISBN 978-0-313-32086-6.
- Chant, Colin; Goodman, David (1999). Pre-Industrial Cities and Technology. Abingdon, England: Routledge. ISBN 978-1-134-63620-4.
- Crandall, David P. (2000). The Place of Stunted Ironwood Trees: A Year in the Lives of the Cattle-herding Himba of Namibia. New York, NY: Continuum International Publishing Group, Inc. ISBN 978-0-82641-270-6.
- Creswell, K. A. C. (January 1915). "Persian Domes before 1400 A.D.". The Burlington Magazine for Connoisseurs. 26 (142). The Burlington Magazine Publications, Ltd.: 146–155. JSTOR 859853.
- Cygielman, Mario (2009), "Tholos tombs in Etruria", in Mileto, C.; Vegas, F. (eds.), Earthen Domes and Habitats: Villages of Northern Syria. An architectural tradition shared by East and West, Edizioni ETS, pp. 33–37, ISBN 978-8-846-72535-6
- Delougaz, Pinhas; Kantor, Helene A. (1996). Alizadeh, Abbas (ed.). Chogha Mish: The First Five Seasons of Excavations 1961-1971 Part 1: Text (PDF). Chicago, IL: The Oriental Institute of the University of Chicago. ISBN 978-1-885-92301-1. Archived from the original (PDF) on 2012-10-07.
- Dodge, Hazel (1984). Building Materials and Techniques in the Eastern Mediterranean from the Hellenistic Period to the Fourth Century AD (Thesis) (PhD Thesis ed.). Newcastle, England: Newcastle University. hdl:10443/868.
- Foti, Pilade; Fraddosio, Aguinaldo; Lepore, Nicola; Piccioni, Mario Daniele (2017). "On the mechanics of corbelled domes: new analytical and computational approaches". Research on Engineering Structures & Materials. 3 (3): 210–226. doi:10.17515/resm2016.71st0725.
- Fraddosio, Aguinaldo; Lepore, Nicola; Piccioni, Mario Daniele (2019). "Further refinement of the Corbelling Theory for the equilibrium analysis of corbelled domes" (PDF). Curved and Layered Structures. 6 (1): 30–40. doi:10.1515/cls-2019-0003.
- Frizell, Barbro Santillo (1998). "Giants or Geniuses? Monumental Building at Mycenae". Current Swedish Archaeology. 6 (1): 167–184. doi:10.37718/CSA.1998.13.
- Grabar, Oleg (December 1963). "The Islamic Dome, Some Considerations". Journal of the Society of Architectural Historians. 22 (4): 191–198. doi:10.2307/988190. JSTOR 988190.
- Hill, Donald Routledge (1996). A history of engineering in classical and medieval times (Illustrated ed.). New York, NY: Routledge. ISBN 978-0-415-15291-4.
- Hitchcock, Don, Mezhirich - Mammoth Camp
- Hosey, Lance, ed. (2012). The Shape of Green: Aesthetics, Ecology, and Design. Washington, DC: Island Press. ISBN 978-1-61091-214-3.
- Hourihane, Colum, ed. (2012). The Grove Encyclopedia of Medieval Art and Architecture. Oxford, England: Oxford University Press. ISBN 978-0-19-539536-5.
- Jones, Mark Wilson (2003). Principles of Roman architecture. New Haven, CT: Yale University Press. ISBN 978-0-300-10202-4.
- Kawami, Trudy S. (1982). "Parthian Brick Vaults in Mesopotamia, Their Antecedents and Decendants [sic]" (PDF). Journal of the Ancient Near Eastern Society. 14: 61–67. Archived from the original (PDF) on 2013-10-29.
- Kubba, Shamil A. A. (1987). Mesopotamian Architecture and Town Planning: from the Mesolithic to the end of the Proto-Historic Period c. 10,000-3,500 B.C. Oxford, England: B.A.R. ISBN 978-0-860-54476-0.
- Lancaster, Lynne C. (2012). "Ash mortar and vaulting tubes: agricultural production and the building industry in North Africa". In Camporeale, Stefano; Dessales, Hélène; Pizzo, Antonio (eds.). ARQUEOLOGÍA DE LA CONSTRUCCIÓN III, Los procesos constructivos en eL mundo romano: La economía de Las obras (École Normale Supérieure, París, 10-11 de diciembre de 2009). MADRID-MÉRIDA: Consejo Superior de Investigaciones Científicas (CSIC). pp. 145–160. ISBN 978-84-00-09501-7.
- Lehmann, Karl (1989) [1945], "The Dome of Heaven", in Kleinbauer, W. Eugène (ed.), Modern Perspectives in Western Art History: An Anthology of Twentieth-Century Writings on the Visual Arts (Medieval Academy Reprints for Teaching), vol. 25, University of Toronto Press, pp. 227–270, ISBN 978-0-802-06708-1
- Leick, Gwendolyn, ed. (2003), "Dome", A Dictionary of Ancient Near Eastern Architecture, London and New York: Taylor & Francis, ISBN 978-0-203-19965-7
- Luo, Di (2020). "Dome of Heaven: From the Lantern Ceiling to the Chinese Wooden Dome". In Lerner, Jeffrey D.; Shi, Yaohua (eds.). Silk Roads: From Local Realities to Global Narratives. Oxford, England: Oxbow Books. ISBN 978-1-789-25473-0.
- Levy, Richard; Dawson, Peter (2009). "Using finite element methods to analyze ancient architecture: an example from the North American Arctic" (PDF). Journal of Archaeological Science. 36 (10). Elsevier: 2298–2307. Bibcode:2009JArSc..36.2298L. doi:10.1016/j.jas.2009.06.014.
- Lucore, Sandra K. (2009), "Archimedes, the North Baths at Morgantina, and Early Developments in Vaulted Construction", in Kosso, Cynthia; Scott, Anne (eds.), The nature and function of water, baths, bathing, and hygiene from antiquity through the Renaissance, Leiden, The Netherlands: Brill, pp. 43–59, ISBN 978-9-004-17357-6
- Mainstone, Rowland J. (2001). Developments in Structural Form (2 ed.). Abingdon, England: Routledge. ISBN 978-0-7506-5451-7.
- Martines, Giangiacomo (2015). "Four - The Conception and Construction of Drum and Dome". In Marder, Tod A.; Jones, Mark Wilson (eds.). The Pantheon: From Antiquity to the Present (PDF). Cambridge, England: Cambridge University Press. pp. 99–131. doi:10.1017/CBO9781139015974.005. ISBN 978-1-139-01597-4.
- Melaragno, Michele G. (1991). An Introduction to Shell Structures: the Art and Science of Vaulting (softcover ed.). New York, New York: Van Nostrand Reinhold. ISBN 978-1-4757-0225-5.
- McNeil, Ian, ed. (2002). An Encyclopaedia of the History of Technology. Abingdon, England: Routledge. ISBN 978-1-134-98165-6.
- Minke, Gernot (2012). Building with Earth: Design and Technology of a Sustainable Architecture (3rd; revised ed.). Berlin, Germany: Walter de Gruyter. ISBN 978-3-034-60872-5.
- Ӧzdeniz, M. B.; Bekleyen, A.; Gönül, I. A.; Gönül, H.; Sarigül, H.; Ilter, T.; Dalkiliç, N.; Yildirim, M. (1998). "Vernacular domed houses of Harran, Turkey". Habitat International. 22 (4). Great Britain: Elsevier Science Ltd.: 477–485. doi:10.1016/S0197-3975(98)00027-7.
- Palmer, Douglas; Pettitt, Paul; Bahn, Paul G. (2005). Unearthing the past: the great archaeological discoveries that have changed history (Illustrated ed.). Guilford, CT: Globe Pequot. ISBN 978-1-59228-718-5.
- Palyvou, Clairy (2009), "Prehistoric dome architecture in the Aegean", in Mileto, C.; Vegas, F. (eds.), Earthen Domes and Habitats: Villages of Northern Syria. An architectural tradition shared by East and West, Edizioni ETS, pp. 33–37, ISBN 978-8-846-72535-6
- Paner, Henryk; Borcowski, Zbigniew (2007). "Dome graves and other uncommon constructions from the Fourth Cataract region". In Näser, Claudia; Lange, Mathias (eds.). Proceedings of the Second International Conference on the Archaeology of the Fourth Nile Cataract, Berlin, August 4th - 6th, 2005. Wiesbaden, Germany: Otto Harrassowitz Verlag. ISBN 978-3-447-05680-9.
- Revuelta, O. Abril; Merino, F. Lasheras (2014). "Domes of adobe and stone on the rural architecture of centre of Castilla y León (Spain)". In Mileto, C.; Vegas, F.; García Soriano, L.; Cristini, V. (eds.). Vernacular Architecture: Towards a Sustainable Future (PDF). Boca Raton, Florida: CRC Press. doi:10.1201/b17393.
- Rovero, Luisa; Tonietti, Ugo (2012). "Structural behaviour of earthen corbelled domes in the Aleppo's region" (PDF). Materials and Structures. 45. Springer Science+Business Media: 171–184. doi:10.1617/s11527-011-9758-1.
- Salvadori, M.G. (1987). "The Anasazi cribbed domes". Building and Environment. 22 (3). Elsevier Ltd: 233–235. Bibcode:1987BuEnv..22..233S. doi:10.1016/0360-1323(87)90011-4. ISSN 0360-1323.
- Sinopoli, Anna (2010). "No Tension behaviour and Best Shape of Pseudo-Vaults". Construction History. 25. The Construction History Society: 21–51. JSTOR 41613958.
- Smith, Earl Baldwin (1978) [1st Pub. 1950]. The Dome: A Study in the History of Ideas. Princeton, NJ: Princeton University Press. ISBN 978-0-691-03875-9.
- Spiers, Richard Phené (1911). "Vault" . In Chisholm, Hugh (ed.). Encyclopædia Britannica. Vol. 27 (11th ed.). Cambridge University Press. pp. 956–961.
- Steinhardt, Nancy Shatzman (1993). "The Tangut Royal Tombs near Yinchuan". Muqarnas: An Annual on Islamic Art and Architecture. 10: 369–381.
- Sullivan, Michael; Qiyi, Liu; Silbergeld, Jerome (4 March 2022). "Chinese architecture". Encyclopedia Britannica.
- Tampone, Gennaro (2012), "On the Origins of the Dome" (PDF), Proceedings of the International Congress on Domes in the World, Florence, Florence, Italy: Nardini Editore, pp. 7–14
- Tunca, Önhan; Rutten, Katrien (2009), "The corbelled dome in the archaeology of the ancient Near East", in Mileto, C.; Vegas, F. (eds.), Earthen Domes and Habitats: Villages of Northern Syria. An architectural tradition shared by East and West, Edizioni ETS, pp. 33–37, ISBN 978-8-846-72535-6
- Turner, Geoffrey (2020). Russell, John Malcolm (ed.). The British Museum’s Excavations at Nineveh, 1846–1855. Leiden, The Netherlands: Brill. doi:10.1163/9789004435377. ISBN 978-90-04-43537-7.
- van Vuuren, Chris J. (2007). "Reconstructing the Ndebele grass dome house: an integrated heritage initiative". South African Journal of Art History. 22 (2): 179–194.
- Wang, Zhongshu (1982), Han Civilization, translated by Chang, Kwang-chih, New Haven and London: Yale University Press, ISBN 978-0-300-02723-5.
- Watson, William (2000), The Arts of China to AD 900, New Haven: Yale University Press, ISBN 978-0-300-08284-5.
- Wilkie, David S.; Morelli, Gilda A. (2000). "Forest Foragers: A Day in the Life of Efe Pygmies in the Democratic Republic of Congo". Cultural Survival Quarterly. 24 (3). Cambridge, MA: Cultural Survival, Inc.
- Williams, Hector (2005). "The Exploration of Ancient Stymphalos, 1982-2002" (PDF). Ancient Arcadia: Papers from the Third International Seminar on Ancient Arcadia, Held at the Norwegian Institute at Athens, 7–10 May 2002. Uppsala, Sweden: Paul Forlag Astroms.
- Winter, Frederick E. (2006). Studies in Hellenistic Architecture (illustrated ed.). Toronto, Canada: University of Toronto Press. ISBN 978-0-8020-3914-9.
- Wright, G.R.H. (2009). Ancient Building Technology, Volume 3: Construction (2 Vols) (illustrated ed.). Leiden, The Netherlands: Brill. ISBN 978-9-004-17745-1.
