= Musgum mud hut =

Traditional dwelling used by the Musgum people

Musgum Mud Huts
- Tolek
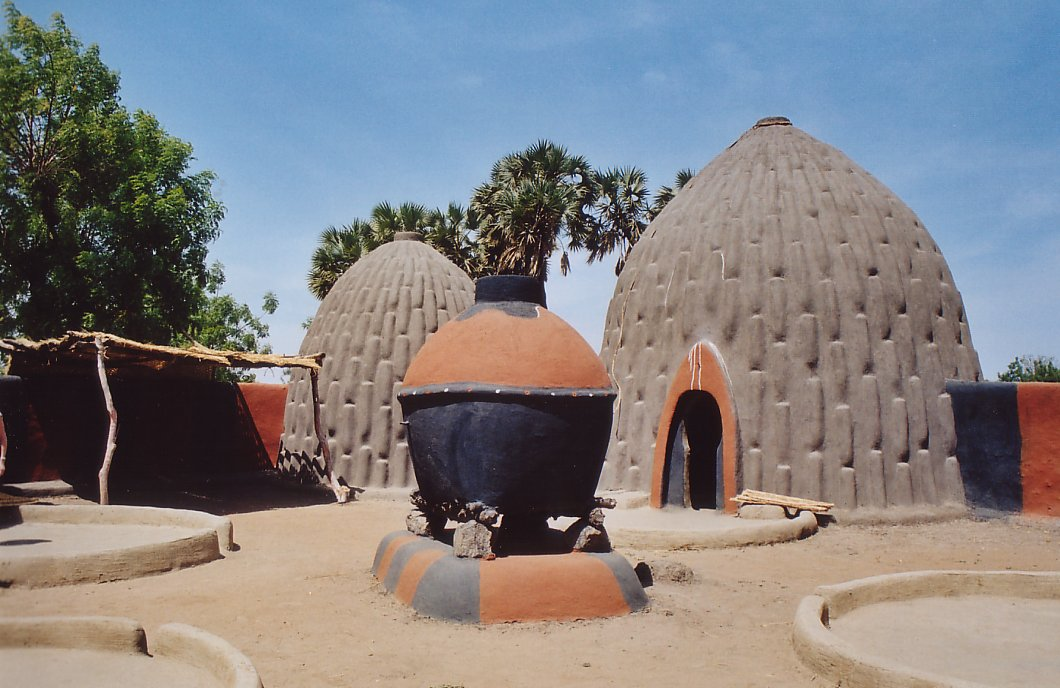
- Musgum huts in the shape of a shell in Far North province, Cameroon
- Alternative names: French: Cases Obus

General information
- Architectural style: Beehive house
- Location: Cameroon
- Current tenants: Villagers
- Cost: Low cost
- Owner: Musgum people

Height
- Height: 9 m (30 ft)

Musgum mud huts or Musgum dwelling units are traditional domestic structures built of mud by the ethnic Musgum people in the Maga sub-division, Mayo-Danay division, Far North Province in Cameroon. (Musgum also is spelled as Mousgoum.) Referred to in Munjuk as Tolek, the dwellings are built in a variety of shapes, such as tall domed or conical dwellings or huts, some with a reverse-V shape, and others with geometric designs.

Toleks are an example of earth structures. Of simple design, they are constructed of mud, thatch, and water by local residents using few tools. Resembling the shape of beehives or shells, they are also known as "cases obus" (granate houses). They are adobe structures, a variant of cob, and are in the catenary arch form, which can bear maximum weight with the minimum use of building materials. The dwellings also are described as "beehive type" because of their dome shape. They are considered to be an important architectural style of Cameroon, although not in fashion in the present day.

== History ==
The houses were built with earth, following a traditional practice before the advent of cement. These structures are no longer popular, however, as they are considered to be outdated. Very few Musgums build them now, though a resurgence in appreciation for their role in Musgum history has resulted in more recent construction.

== Architecture ==
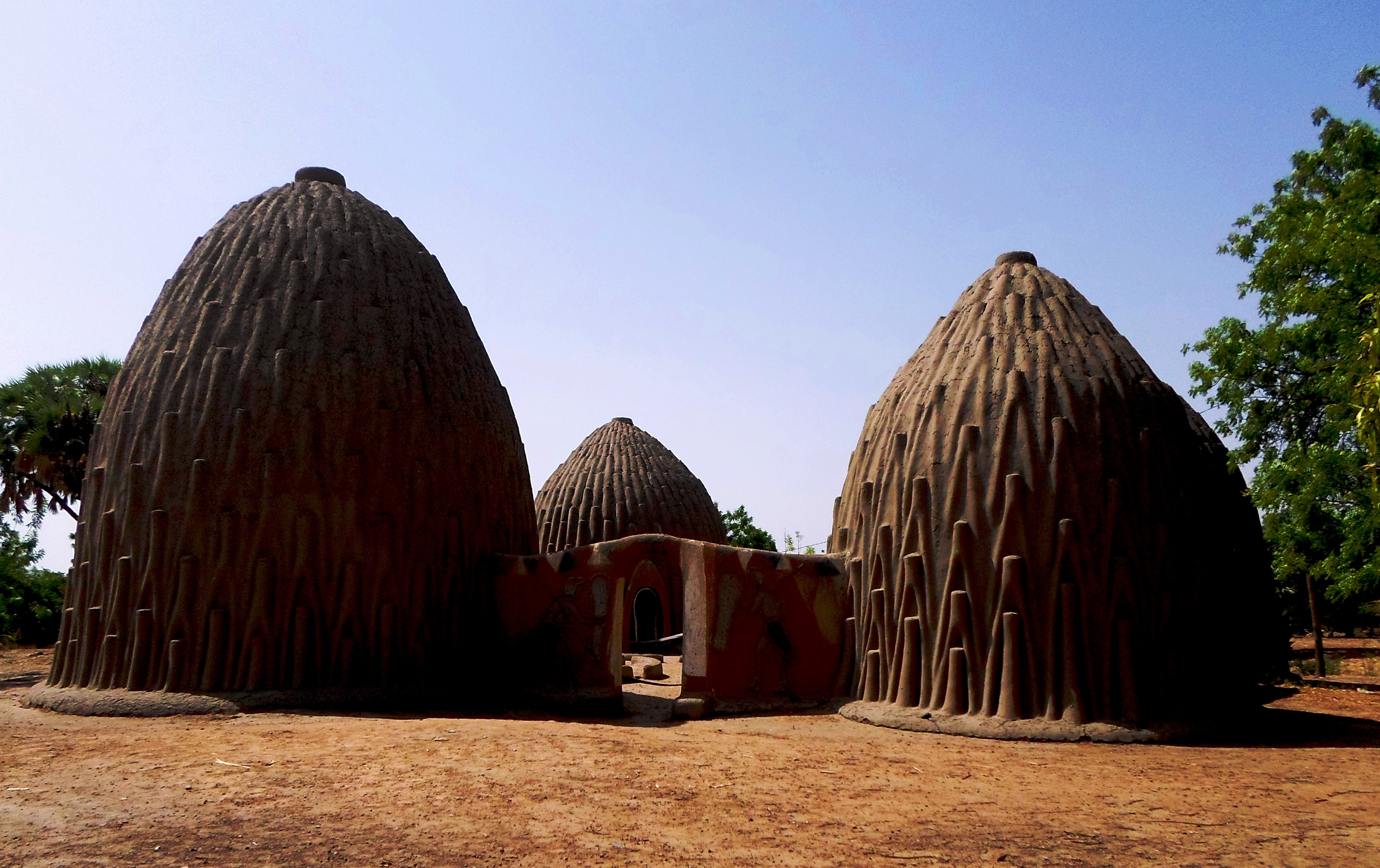
Traditional huts of the Musgum people

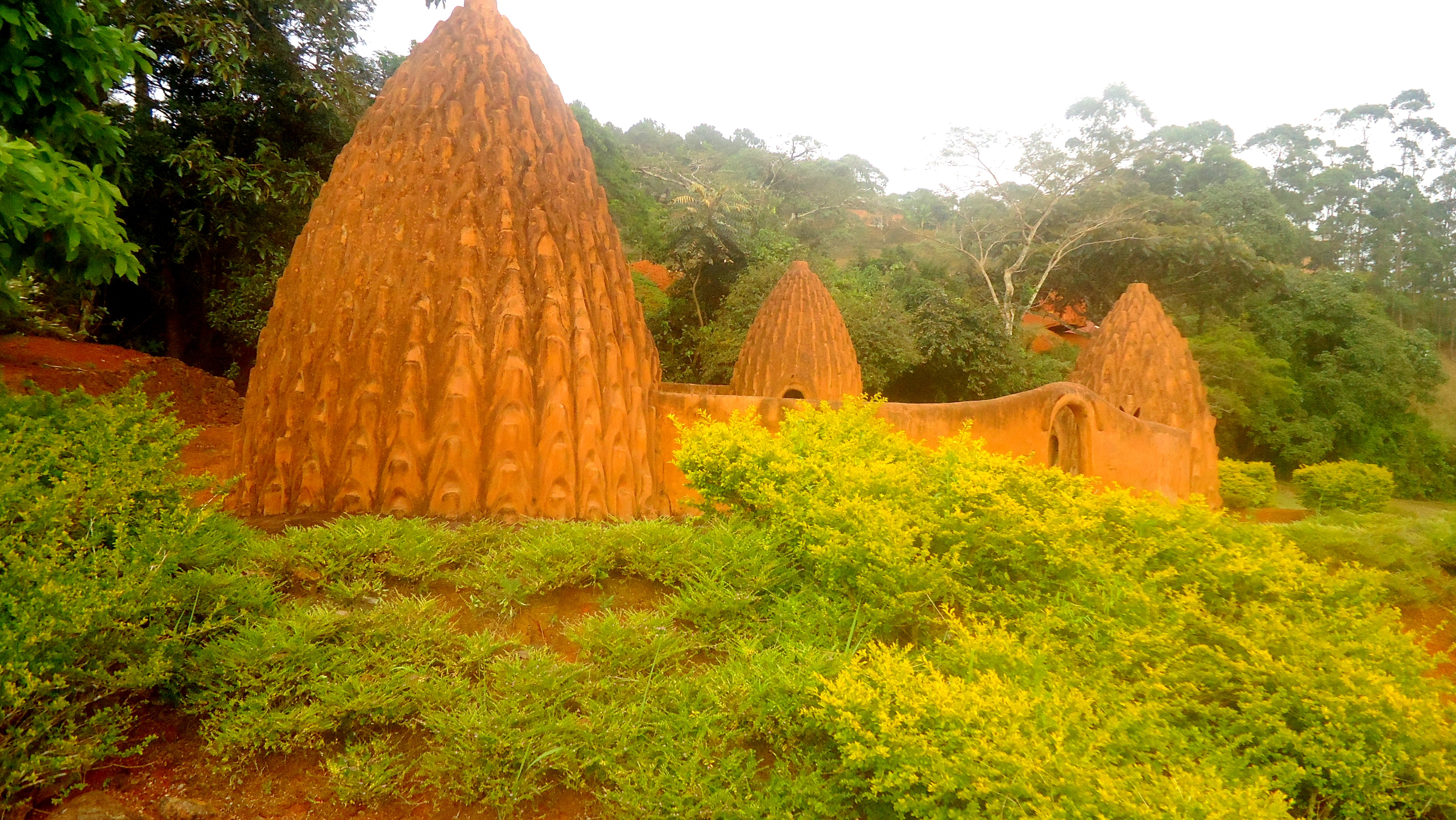
Musgum huts, rain season

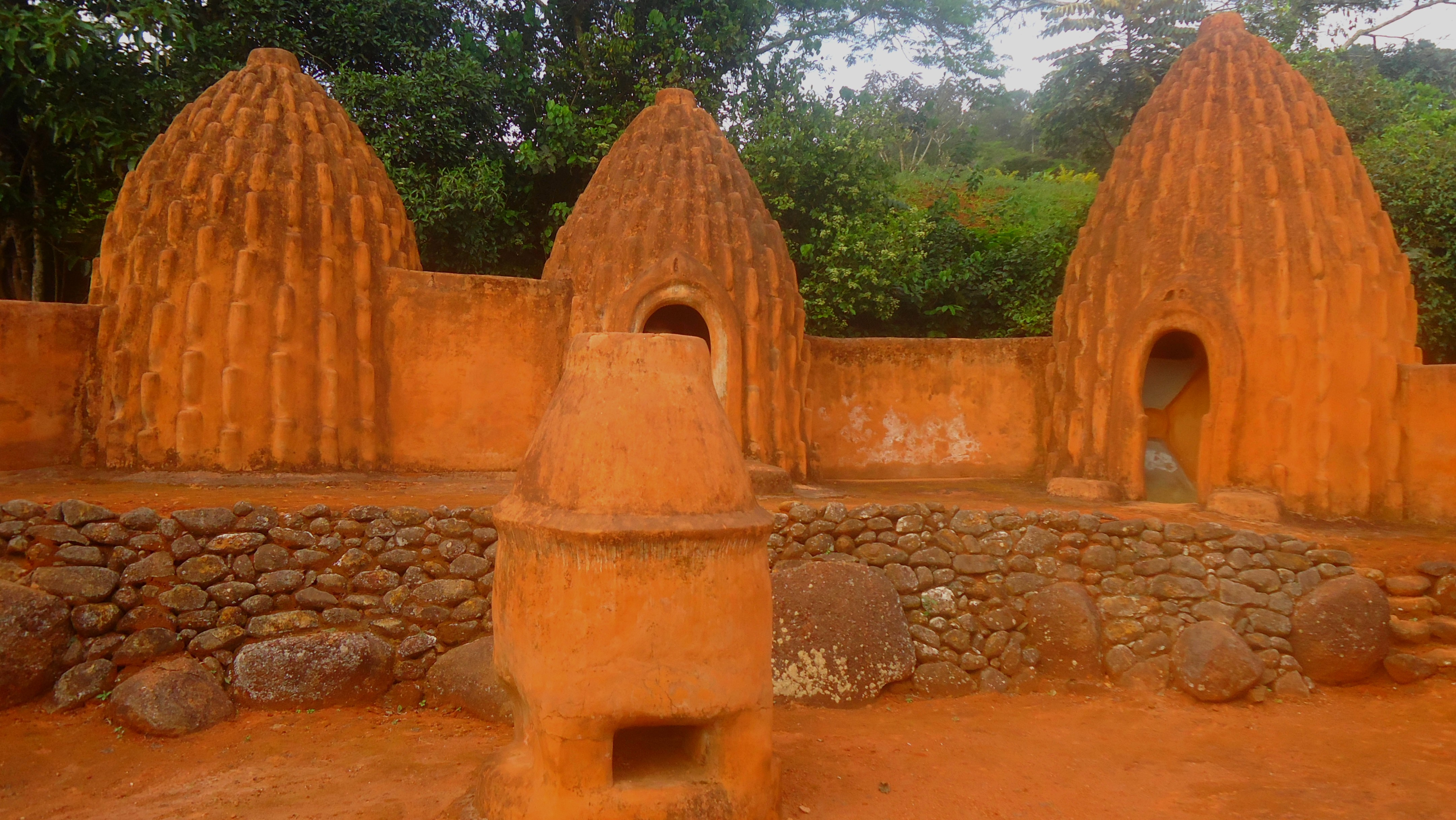
Musgum Huts

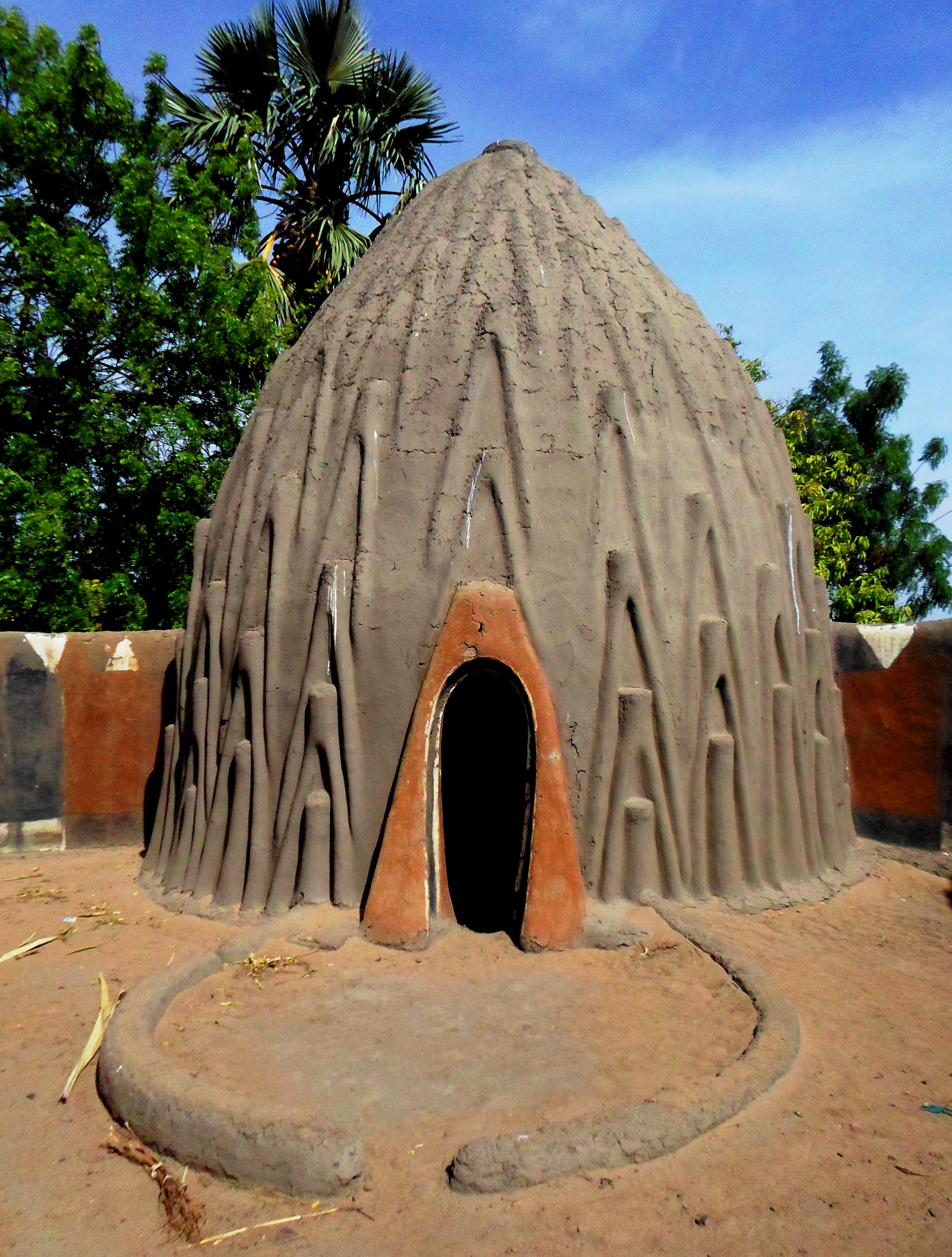
Traditional hut

The Musgum people in Cameroon constructed their mud houses with compressed sun-dried mud. Mud is laid over a thatch of lashed reeds. They are compared to adobe structures or variants of cob structures, which are made from sand, clay, water, and some kind of fibrous or organic material such as sticks, straw, and/or manure. Although of simple design, they are well planned from a utility viewpoint. The houses were built with geometric designs. They were built in the shape of a shell in inverted-“V’ or conical form. Ronald Rael, an architect and author of the book entitled Earth Architecture, has observed that the Musgum houses are of "a catenary arch—the ideal mathematical form," which can withstand the load of the building with minimum use of material. Because of the inverted form of an arc of a chain, the domes are slim and work on the principle of compression providing rigidity to the structure without any twisting or bending moments. The geometric patterns on the exterior face of the domes provide a foothold for workers who stand on them during construction and also during subsequent maintenance. The exterior design and large height of the structures (nearly 9 m (30 ft)) keeps the houses cool inside on hot summer days.

A small circular opening at the top of the huts also helps with air circulation and is used as an escape hatch if subjected to flooding. This circular opening, a few inches in diameter, also known as a smoke hole, is closed with a slab or a pot during the rains to prevent water entering the house. Entrance is provided by a single door, which is narrow up to knee level, but widens at shoulder level, and is said to resemble a keyhole.

Toleks form part of a complex of housing units, granaries, and a central courtyard enclosed within a thatched compound wall. The walls are connected to provide access. The exterior surfaces are grooved so that rain water can drain easily. The complex also is protected with fencing. Space is provided for expansion of the dwelling units for each new wife or daughter-in-law or, for additions to the family. The technique adopted during construction is called the mud coil pottery technique. In this method, the mud layers are placed spirally with each lift of about 0.5 m. Each lift is allowed to dry before the next one is added. The walls are thicker at the base, gradually thinning out toward the top, thereby contributing to the structure's stability. The relief lines are created as the construction proceeds upward in the "V" shape or with straight line grooves to facilitate quick and easy draining of water when it rains.

== See also ==
- Early and simple domes
