= Musgum people =

Musgum
Mulwi
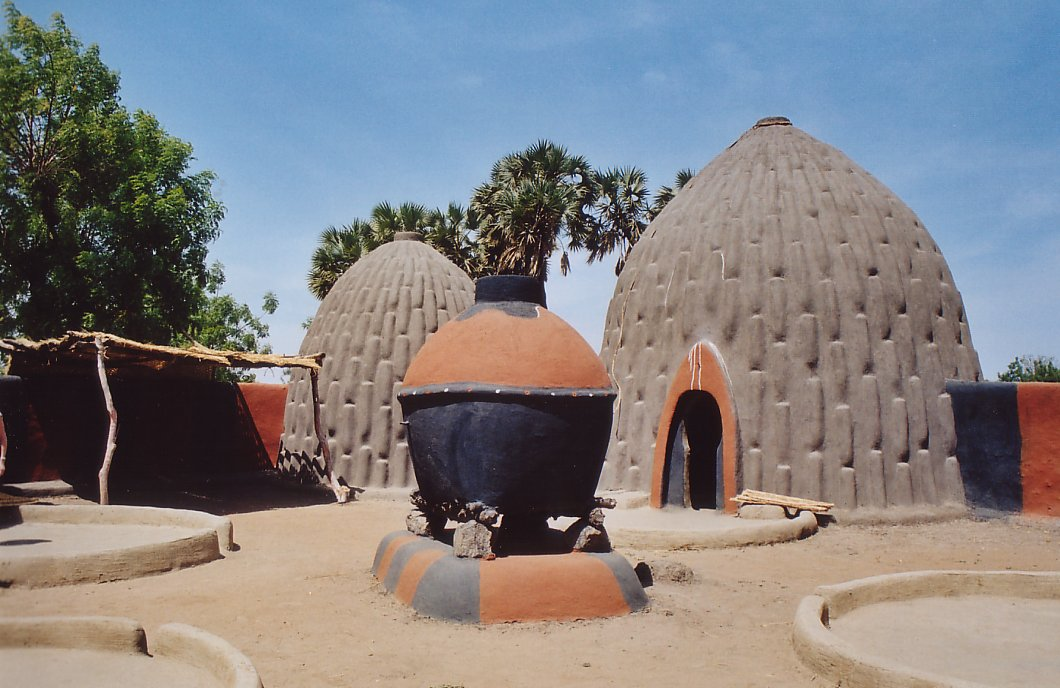
- A Musgum home in Cameroon made of earth and grass.

Total population
- 164,400

Regions with significant populations
- Cameroon, Chad
- Cameroon: 140,000
- Chad: 24,400

Languages
- Musgu

Religion
- Islam

Related ethnic groups
- Kotoko and other Chadic peoples

The Musgum or Mulwi are a Chadic ethnic group in Cameroon, Chad, and northern Nigeria. They speak Musgu, a Chadic language, which had 61,500 speakers in Cameroon in 1982 and 24,408 speakers in Chad in 1993. The Musgum call themselves Mulwi.

== Distribution ==
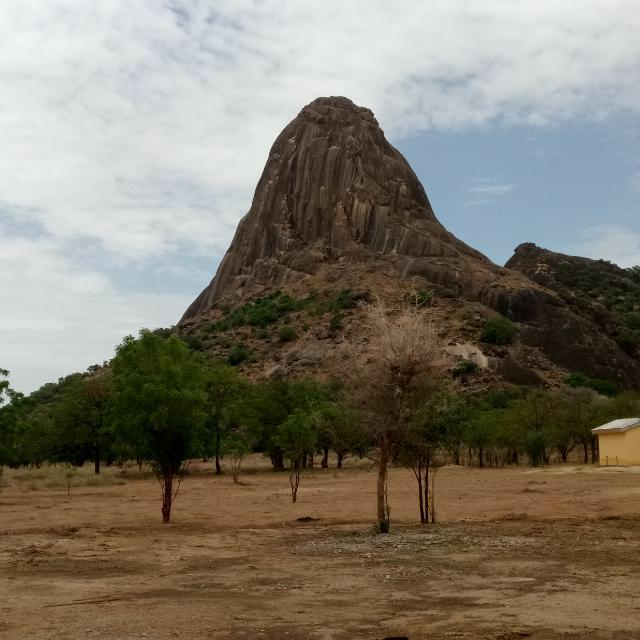
Mindif Peak, Far North Region

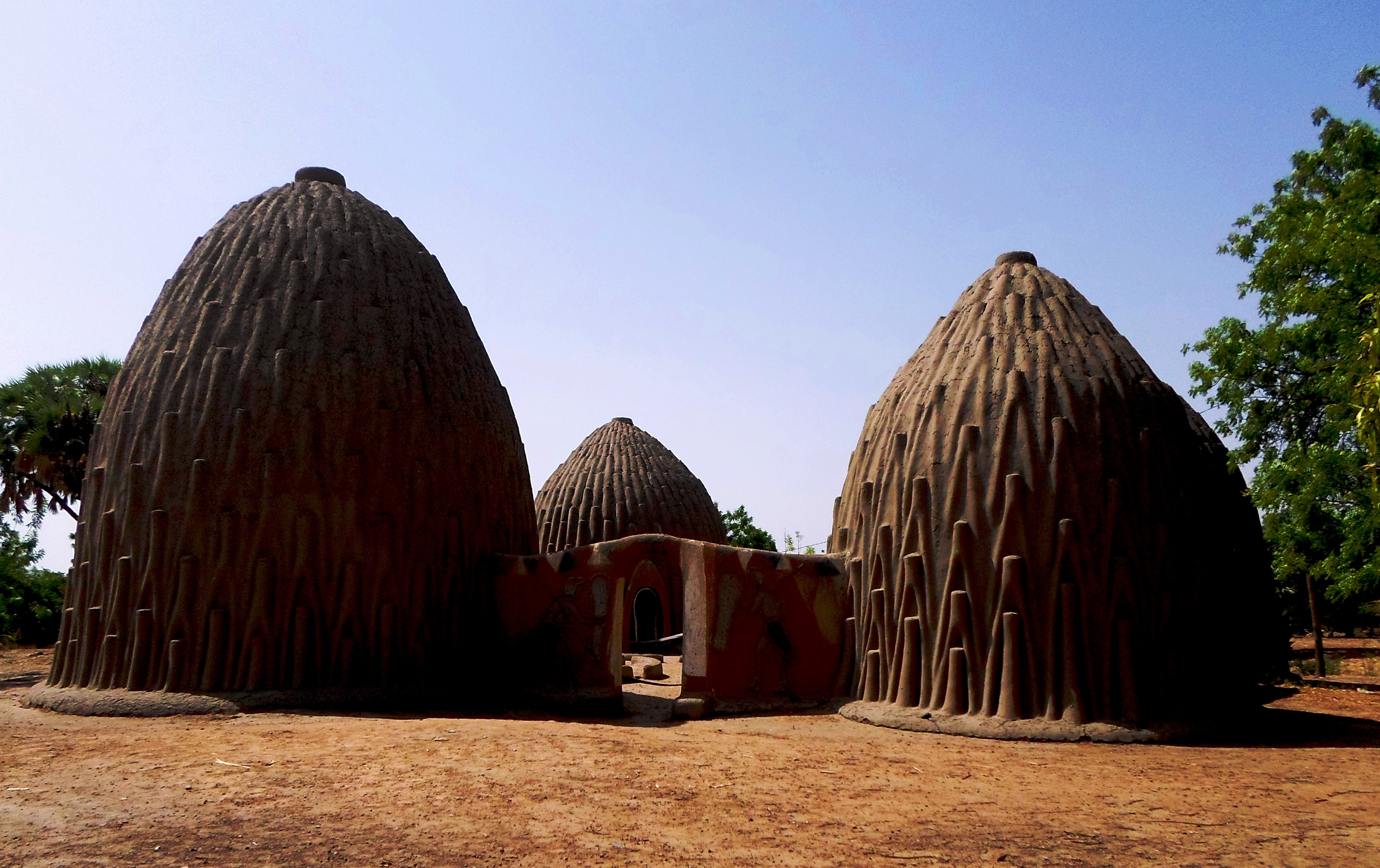
Traditional huts of the Mousgoum people

In Cameroon, the Musgum live in the Maga sub-division, Kai-Kai sub-division Mayo-Danay division, Far North Province. In Chad, they live in Bongor Subprefecture, Guelendeng, Katoa Mayo-Kebbi Prefecture, Wadang and in N'Djaména Subprefecture, in areas such as Ngueli, Sukkabir, etc. Chari-Baguirmi Prefecture. This territory lies between the Chari and Logone rivers. Increasing numbers of Musgum in Cameroon are settling farther north, in the direction of Kousséri. Waza, a national park in Cameroon is founded on Musgum territory. This name derives from the Musgum word "Waza" which means "my house, or my homeland"; Moulvoudaye, which means "I buy people" was a slave trading center. We also have the "peak of Mindif" translated as "la den tde Mindif", comes from a Musgum word "Mindif" which literally means "the mouth of man" The Musgum people are autochthone people in Kousseri, living with their fellow brothers Kotoko. Both of these tribes are descendant of SAO people who were the pioneer around the Lake Chad. In Nigeria, they live mainly in Borno State in Eastern North of Nigeria, especially in areas such as Bama, Banki, Gambaru, villages neighbouring Darak, Blangoua with their neighbours Kanuri with which they formed the Borno Empire. They have a common history since the time they harmoniously lived and constituted the Baguirmi Empire. In one word, they are spread in five sub-divisions over six in the Far North Region.

== History ==
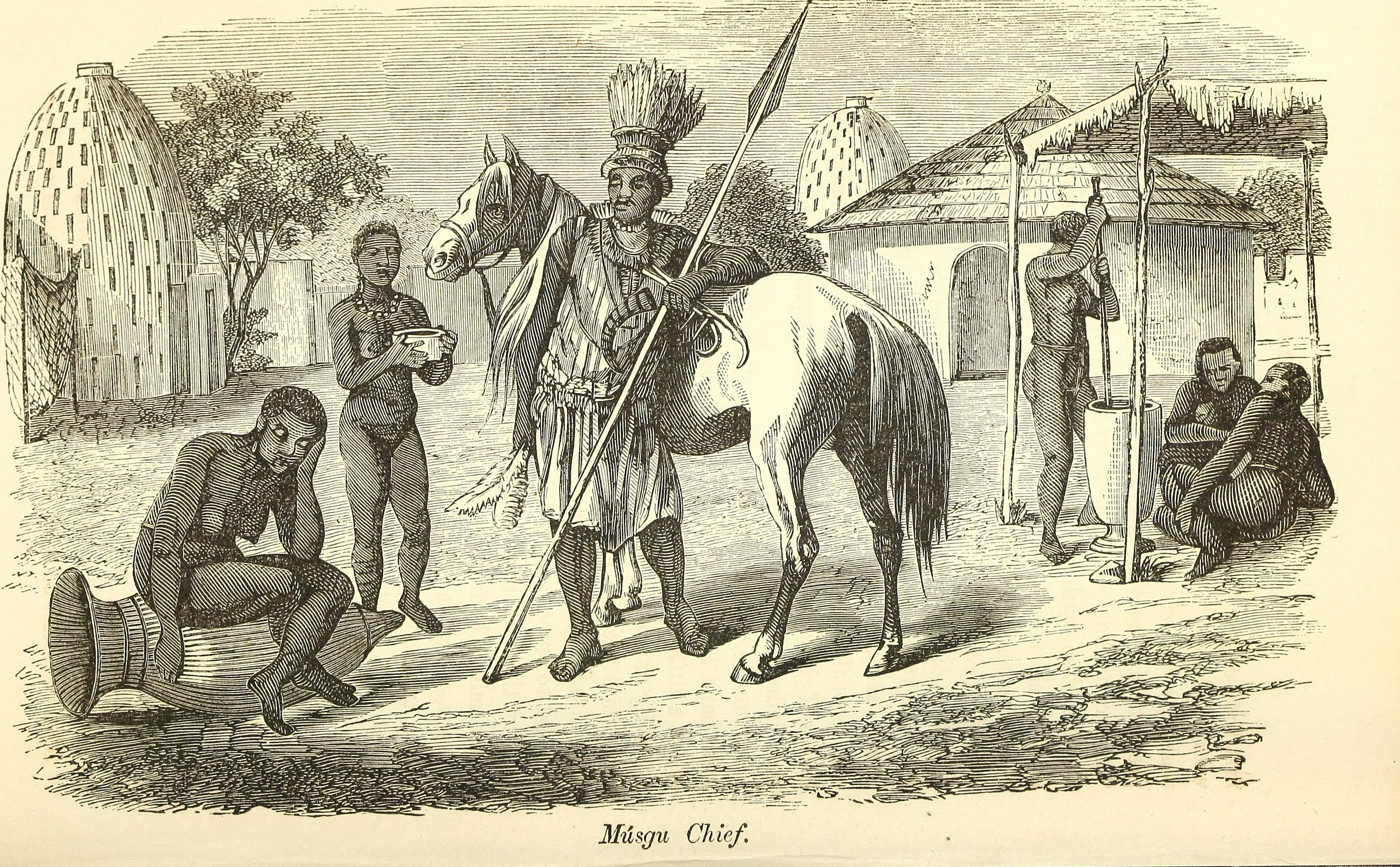
Musgu chief, ca. 1851

The Musgum are Afro-Asiatic in origin, having displaced the Paleo-Sudanese at the present territory along with other Neo-Sudanese groups. There were frequent battles between the Musgum and the forces of the Bagirmi kingdom from the 17th to 19th centuries. In the 19th century, the eastern Musgums began paying tribute to Bagirmi while the western Musgums faced military pressure from the Fulani under the guidance of Mahdist leader Sheikh Hayatu ibn Sa'id. Some of the Musgum chiefs such as Zigla, Awersing etc. came out with their troops to drive the Fulani out and to take back their areas. As such a tremendous battle was held in the village of Bogo in Diamaré Division (its name comes from a Musgum word meaning "noise" and refers to the site of the battle). At the fullness of time, that war was followed by the victory of Musgum troops and the loss of the territory by the Fulani groups. That caused them to flee away from Bogo to Adamawa. After having succeeded in the North and Adamawa region, some of the Fulani people returned to Bogo where they adopted and mingled with the native Musgums. This is a process whereby a Fulani man decides deliberately to give his daughter to a wealthy Musgum man, or to a man known by his community as chief of a village. Their aim was to inherit by a blood relationship the wealth and chiefdoms. For instance, the kingdom of Bogo which was a Musgum kingdom mixed with Fulani by marriage covenant. Be it in Cameroon or in Chad, Musgum areas are ruled by a native Musgum chief and not by an outsider. For example, the Sultanate of Pouss, the Lamidat of Guirvidig, the Sultanate of Zina, and the Lamidat of Bogo. Musgum people are also known as initiators of "Laba" or Labana, which is a traditional rite for fighting. In the present day world, the dream of a young Musgum man is to practice a military activity.

== Culture ==
Fishing is an important activity for the Musgum during the dry and rainy season when the Logone River floods. This has led to ethnic tensions with their rival fishermen of the Kotoko ethnic group (who are also of the Chadic branch of the Afro-Asiatic stock).

Many Musgums also engage in agriculture where staple crops include ground nuts and cotton which is sold for commercial use.

Most Musgums profess Islam. However, traditional beliefs and practices still remain influential.

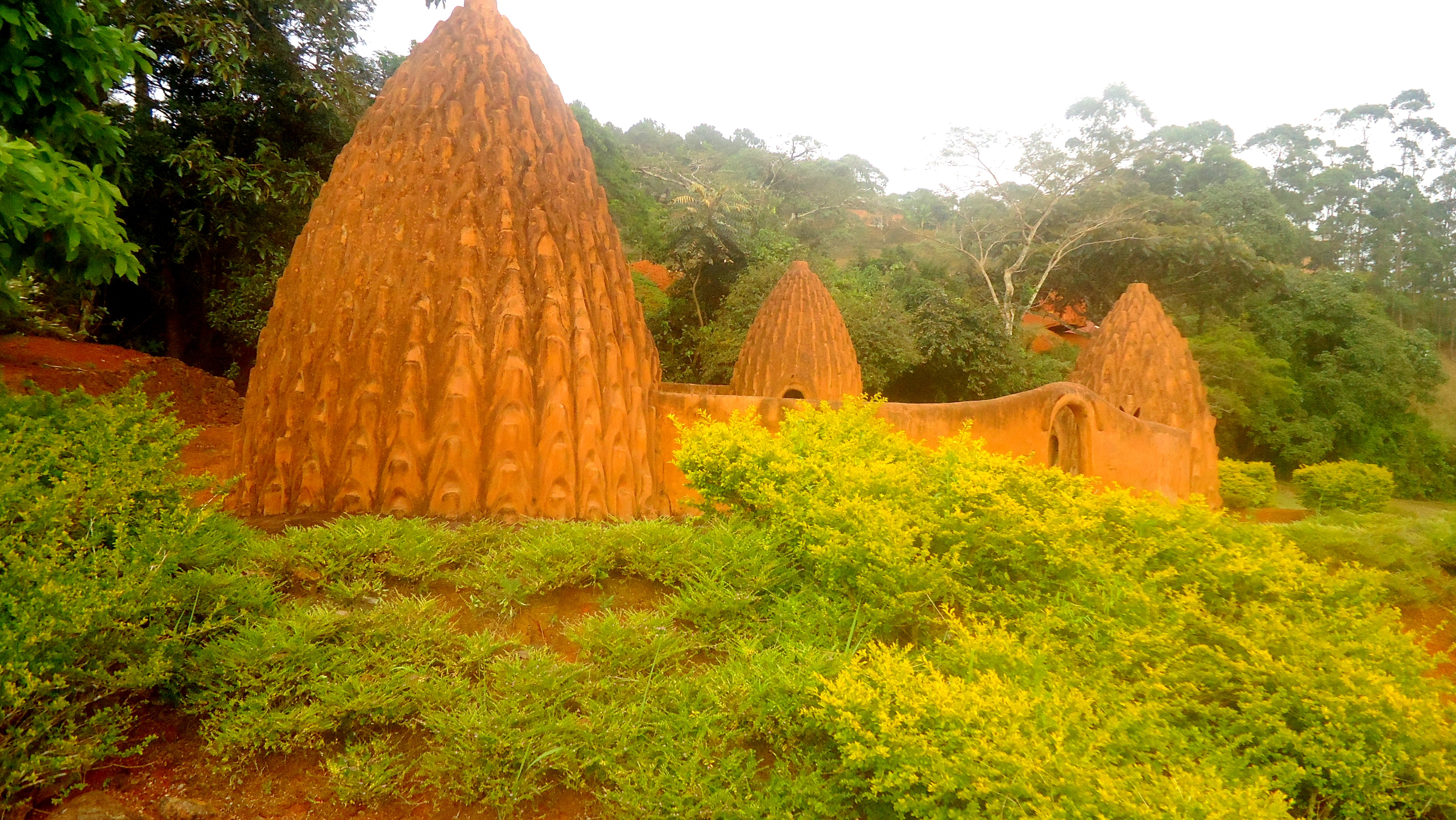
Musgum Hut

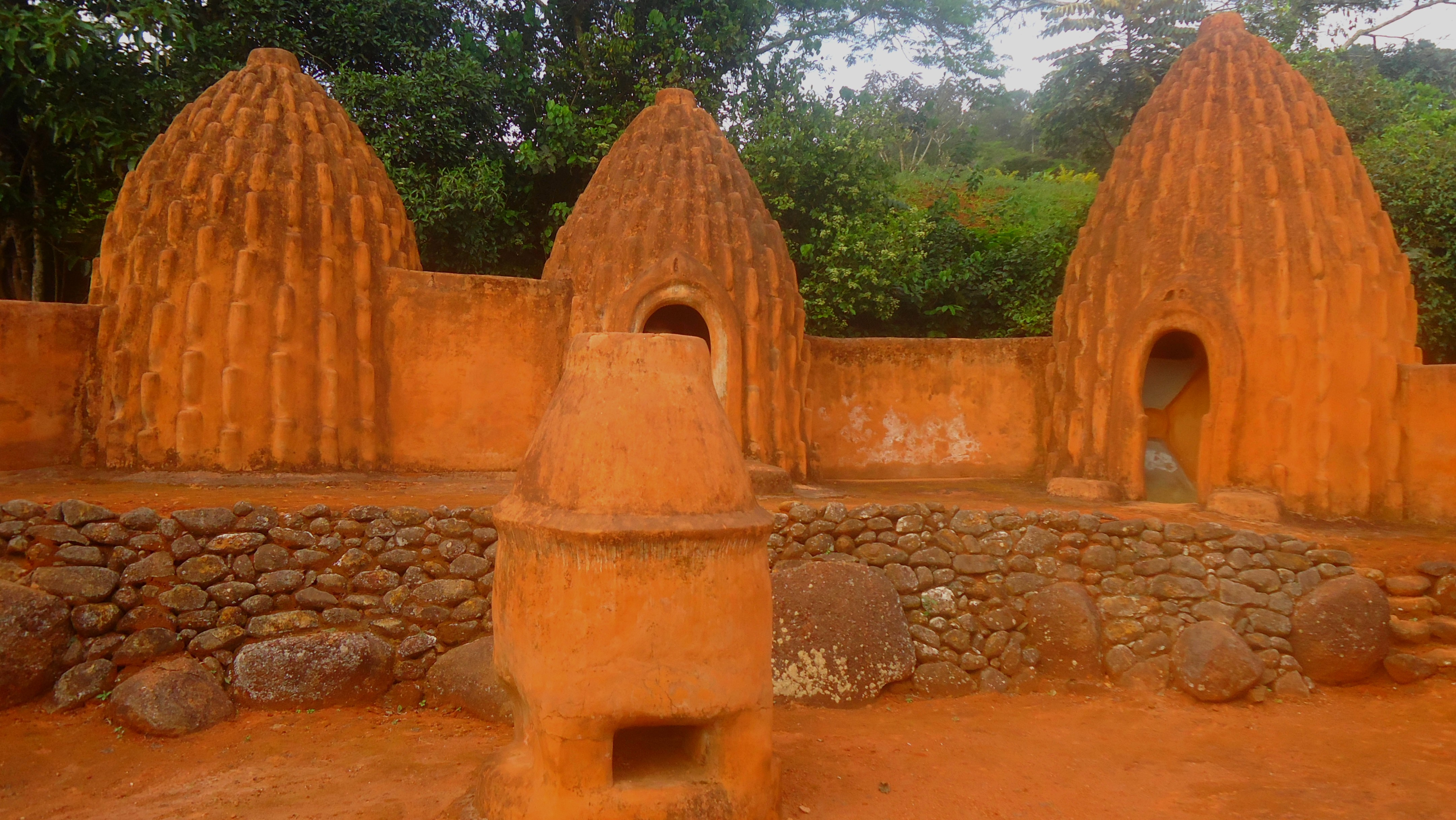
Musgum Village

== See also ==
- Musgum dwelling units

== General References ==
- "Eight killed as rival fishermen clash in Cameroon". 12 January 2007. Reuters. Accessed 7 January 2008.
- Gordon, Raymond G., Jr. (ed.) (2005): "Musgu". Ethnologue: Languages of the World, 15th ed. Dallas: SIL International. Accessed 2 February 2007.
- Mbaku, John Mukum (2005). Culture and Customs of Cameroon. Westport, Connecticut: Greenwood Press.
- Neba, Aaron (1999). Modern Geography of the Republic of Cameroon, 3rd ed. Bamenda: Neba Publishers.
