= List of teen sitcoms =

This is a list of teen sitcoms that are originally targeted towards teens aged 13 to 18.

== Argentina ==
- Calientes (2000), Canal Trece
- Cebollitas (1997–98), Telefe
- Champs 12 (2009–10), América TV
- Consentidos (2009–10), Canal Trece
- Cuando toca la campana (2011–12), Disney Channel Latin America
- Divina, está en tu corazón (2004), Canal Trece
- Floricienta (2004–05), Canal Trece
- Highway: Rodando la Aventura (2010), Disney Channel Latin America
- Jake & Blake (2009), Disney Channel Latin America
- Jungle Nest (2016), Disney XD Latin America
- Margarita (2024–present), Max
- Montaña rusa (1994–96), Canal Trece
- Montaña rusa, otra vuelta (1996), Canal Trece
- Niní (2009–10), Telefe
- Patito Feo (2007–08), Canal Trece
- Peter Punk (2011–13), Disney Channel Latin America
- Señales del fin del mundo (2013–14), Canal 7
- Simona (2018), Canal Trece
- Supertorpe (2011), Telefe, Disney Channel Latin America
- Violetta (2012–15), Disney Channel Latin America

== Australia ==
- Angry Boys (2011), ABC1
- As the Bell Rings (2007–11), Disney Channel Australia
- Born to Spy (2021), ABC Me
- The Bureau of Magical Things (2018–21), 10 Peach
- Chuck Finn (1999–2000), ABC
- Don't Blame Me (2002–03), Nine Network, ABC3
- Driven Crazy (1998), Network Ten
- A gURLs wURLd (2011), Nine Network
- H_{2}O: Just Add Water (2006–10), Network Ten
- In Your Dreams (2013), Seven Network
- Ja'mie: Private School Girl (2013), ABC1
- Jonah from Tonga (2014), ABC1
- Lockie Leonard (2007–10), Nine Network
- Mal.com (2011), ABC3
- Mind Over Maddie (2013), Disney Channel Australia
- Misery Guts (1998), ABC3
- Mortified (2006–07), Nine Network
- The PM's Daughter (2022–23), ABC Me
- Pugwall (1989–91), Nine Network
- Round the Twist (1989–2001), Seven Network, ABC
- Scooter: Secret Agent (2005), Network Ten
- The Sleepover Club (2002–09), Nine Network
- Summer Heights High (2006–09), ABC1
- Worst Year of My Life Again (2014), ABC3

== Belgium ==
- Buiten De Zone (1994–96), VRT
- De Raad van Soekie (2024–25), Ketnet

== Brazil ==
- Cúmplices de um Resgate (2015–16), SBT
- Floribella (2005–06), Rede Bandeirantes
- Julie e os Fantasmas (2011–12), Rede Bandeirantes, Nickelodeon Brazil
- Quando Toca o Sino (2009–12), Disney Channel Brazil
- Que Talento! (2014–16), Disney Channel Brazil
- Sandy & Junior (1999–2002), Globo Network

== Canada ==
- 6teen (2004–10), Teletoon
- 18 to Life (2010–11), CBC
- About a Girl (2007–08), E!, The N
- Alice, I Think (2006), The Comedy Network
- Baxter (2010–11), Family
- Big Wolf on Campus (1999–2002), YTV
- Boogies Diner (1994–95), syndication
- Braceface (2001–04), Teletoon
- Breaker High (1997–98), YTV
- Clone High (2002–03, 2023–24), Teletoon, Max
- The Communist's Daughter (2021), CBC Gem
- Connor Undercover (2010–11), Family
- Daft Planet (2000–02), Teletoon
- Darcy's Wild Life (2004–06), Family
- Davey & Jonesie's Locker (2024), Amazon Prime Video
- Debra! (2011–12), Family
- Detention Adventure (2019–22), CBC Gem
- Dog House (1990–91), YTV
- Don't Even (2024), Crave
- The Edison Twins (1984–86), CBC
- Family Biz (2009), YTV
- Flash Forward (1995–97), Disney Channel
- Fred's Head (2008), Télétoon
- Fries with That? (2004–05), YTV
- Game On (2015), YTV
- Hangin' In (1981–87), CBC
- Home Sweet Rome! (2023), Family
- How to Be Indie (2009–11), YTV
- I Woke Up a Vampire (2023), Family
- The Latest Buzz (2007–10), Family
- Less Than Kind (2008–13), Citytv, HBO Canada
- Life with Boys (2011–13), YTV
- Life with Derek (2005–09), Family
- Majority Rules! (2009), Teletoon
- Make It Pop (2015–16), YTV, Nickelodeon
- Mr. Meaty (2006–09), Nickelodeon Canada
- Mr. Young (2011–13), YTV
- My Babysitter's a Vampire (2011–13), Teletoon
- Naturally, Sadie (2005–07), Family
- Overruled! (2009–11), Family Channel
- Radio Active (1998–2001), YTV
- Radio Enfer (1995–2001), Canal Famille, Vrak.TV
- Really Me (2011–13), Family
- Popularity Papers (2023–24), YTV
- The Sausage Factory (2001–02), The Comedy Network
- Some Assembly Required (2014–16), YTV
- Son of a Critch (2022–present), CBC
- The Stanley Dynamic (2015–17), YTV
- Stoked (2009–2013), Teletoon
- Student Bodies (1997–99), YTV
- Take Note (2022), Family
- Toby (1968–69), CBC
- What's Up Warthogs! (2011–12), Family
- Wingin' It (2010–13), Family
- Young Drunk Punk (2015), City

== China ==
- As the Bell Rings (2007–11), syndication
- Nonstop (2009), Dragon TV

== Chile ==
- Floribella (2006–07), TVN
- Pobre Rico (2012–13), TVN

== Colombia ==
- Floricienta (2006–07), RCN Televisión
- Isa TK+ (2009–10), Nickelodeon Latin America

== France ==
- Les Années fac (1995–98), TF1
- Classe mannequin (1993–94), M6
- Les Emmerdeurs (2018), YouTube Premium
- Fred's Head (2008), France 2, Unis
- Le Groupe (2001–02), France 2
- Hélène et les Garçons (1992–94), TF1
- Mère et Fille (2012–17), Disney Channel France
- Premiers baisers (1991–95), TF1
- Trop la Classe (2006–10), Disney Channel France

== Germany ==
- Bibi & Tina (2020), Amazon Prime Video
- Kurze Pause (2006–08), Disney Channel Germany
- Türkisch für Anfänger (2006–09), Das Erste

== India ==
- Agadam Bagdam Tigdam (2007), Disney Channel India
- Best of Luck Nikki (2011–16), Disney Channel India
- Break Time Masti Time (2008–09), Disney Channel India
- Dhoom Machaao Dhoom (2007–08), Disney Channel India
- Kya Mast Hai Life (2009–10), Disney Channel India
- Palak Pe Jhalak (2015), Disney Channel India
- Sanya (2005–06), Hungama TV
- Shake It Up (2013), Disney Channel India
- Shararat (2003–07), StarPlus
- Sunaina (2008), Pogo TV
- Sun Yaar Chill Maar (2007–08), Bindass
- The Suite Life of Karan & Kabir (2012–13), Disney Channel India
- Vicky & Vetaal (2006–07), Disney Channel India

== Ireland ==
- Teenology (2007), RTÉ2
- The Young Offenders (2018–present), RTÉ2, BBC Three

== Israel ==
- As the Bell Rings (2009), Disney Channel Israel
- Betzefer (2005–12), Nickelodeon Israel
- Betzefer (2019), Nickelodeon Israel
- Hapijamot (2003–15), Arutz HaYeladim
- Spyders (2020–22), Nickelodeon Israel
- What's the Problem? (2024–present), Zoom, Yes

== Italy ==
- Alex & Co. (2015–17), Disney Channel Italy
- Casa Pierpiero (2011), Disney Channel Italy
- Chiamatemi Giò (2009), Disney Channel Italy
- Compagni di scuola (2001), Rai 2
- Fiore e Tinelli (2007–09), Disney Channel Italy
- Fuoriclasse (2011–15), Rai 1
- In tour (2011–12), Disney Channel Italy
- Life Bites – Pillole di vita (2007–13), Disney Channel Italy
- Maggie & Bianca: Fashion Friends (2016–17), Rai Gulp
- Quelli dell'intervallo (2005–08), Disney Channel Italy
- Quelli dell'Intervallo Cafe (2010–11), Disney Channel Italy
- School Hacks (2018), Disney Channel Italy

== Japan ==
- As the Bell Rings (2010–11), Disney Channel Japan
- Blazing Transfer Students (2017), Netflix
- Minna! ESPer Dayo! (2013), TV Tokyo
- Mischievous Kiss: Love in Tokyo (2013), Fuji TV
- Mob Psycho 100 (2018), Netflix, TV Tokyo
- My Neighbor Seki (2015), MBS
- My Undead Yokai Girlfriend (2024), Amazon Prime Video
- Kyō Kara Ore Wa!! (2018), NTV
- Ouran High School Host Club (2011), TBS
- Switch Girl!! (2011–13), Fuji TV
- Tadashii Ouji no Tsukuri Kata (2008) TV Tokyo

== Malaysia ==
- Waktu Rehat (2010–12), Disney Channel Malaysia
- Wizards of Warna Walk (2019), Disney Channel Malaysia

== Mexico ==
- Atrévete a soñar (2009–10), XEW-TDT
- Cachún cachún ra ra! (1981–87), Televisa
- La CQ (2012-2014), Cartoon Network, Televisa, Canal 5
- La CQ: nuevo ingreso (2024–present), Canal 5
- Miss XV (2012), Nickelodeon Latin America
- ¿Qué le pasa a mi familia? (2021), Canal de Las Estrellas
- Skimo (2006–07), Nickelodeon Latin America
- Soltero con hijas (2019–20), Canal de Las Estrellas

== Netherlands ==
- Als de bel gaat (2009), Disney Channel Netherlands
- Hunter Street (2017–21), Nickelodeon, TeenNick, Nickelodeon UK

== New Zealand ==
- The Amazing Extraordinary Friends (2006–10), TV2
- Being Eve (2001–02), TV3
- bro'Town (2004–09), TV3
- Girl vs. Boy (2012–14), TV2

== Norway ==
- Rektors kontor (2020), NRK Super
- Verst når det gjelder (2021), NRK Super

== Pakistan ==
- Bulbulay (2009–17), ARY Digital
- Rubber Band (2005–07), ARY Digital

== Philippines ==
- Boys Nxt Door (2007–08), GMA Network
- Gokada Go! (2007), ABS-CBN
- Iskul Bukol (1977–90), IBC-13
- Let's Go (2006–07), ABS-CBN
- Luv U (2012–16), ABS-CBN
- Rakista (2008), TV5

== South Korea ==
- Feel It, Genie (2018–19), Olleh TV, YouTube, Facebook
- Nonstop (2000–07), MBC
- What Happens to My Family? (2014–15), KBS2

== Spain ==
- Cambio de clase (2006–09), Disney Channel Spain
- Campamento Newton (2022), Disney Channel Spain
- Colegio mayor (1994–95), Telemadrid
- Más que amigos (1997–99), Telecinco
- Mónica Chef (2017), Clan

== United Kingdom ==
- As the Bell Rings (2007–08), Disney Channel UK
- All at Sea (2013–15), CBBC
- Atlantis High (2001–02), Channel 5
- Bad Education (2012–14; 2023–24), BBC Three
- Belfry Witches (1999–2000), BBC One
- Big Boys (2022–25), Channel 4
- Billy Bunter of Greyfriars School (1952–61), BBC
- Bromwell High (2005), Channel 4
- A Bunch of Fives (1977–78), ITV
- Cavegirl (2002–03), BBC One, CBBC
- Coming of Age (2007–11), BBC Three
- Cone Zone (1995–97), CITV
- The Crust (2004–05), CBBC
- Dani's House (2008–12), CBBC
- Dani's Castle (2013–15), CBBC
- Derry Girls (2018–22), Channel 4
- The First Team (2020), BBC Two
- Fresh Meat (2011–16), Channel 4
- G'wed (2024–present), ITV2
- Harry and Cosh (1999–2003), Channel 5
- Help! I'm a Teenage Outlaw (2004), CITV
- High Hoops (2025–present), CBBC
- Hollywood 7 (2001), CBBC
- Hotel Trubble (2008–11), CBBC
- I Dream (2004), CBBC
- The Inbetweeners (2008–11), E4
- Jinx (2009–10), CBBC
- Kerching! (2003–06), CBBC
- L.A. 7 (2000), CBBC
- The Legend of Dick and Dom (2009–11), CBBC
- Life Bites (2008–09), Disney Channel UK
- Miami 7 (1999), CBBC
- Microsoap (1998–2000), CBBC
- Millie Inbetween (2014–18), CBBC
- Mike and Angelo (1989–2000), CITV
- My Almost Famous Family (2009), CBBC
- My Life as a Popat (2004–07), ITV, CITV
- My Parents Are Aliens (1999–2006), ITV, CITV
- My Phone Genie (2012), CITV
- No Sweat (1997–98), CBBC
- Nova Jones (2021–23), CBBC
- Off the Hook (2009), BBC Three
- Pixelface (2011–12), CBBC
- Pramface (2012–14), BBC Three
- PRU (2022), BBC Three
- Raised by Wolves (2013–16), Channel 4
- The Reluctant Vampire (2026–present), BBC One
- Renford Rejects (1998–2001), Nickelodeon UK
- The Revolting World of Stanley Brown (2012), CBBC
- Roy (2009–15), CBBC
- Sadie J (2011–13), CBBC
- So Awkward (2015–21), CBBC
- Some Girls (2012–14), BBC Three
- Spatz (1990–92), CITV
- Starstreet (2001–02), CITV
- Still So Awkward (2021), CBBC
- Summer in Transylvania (2010–11), Nickelodeon UK
- Teenage Health Freak (1991–93), Channel 4
- Viva S Club (2002), CBBC
- Weirdsister College (2001), ITV
- The Wild House (1997–99), CBBC
- Young Dracula (2006–14), CBBC
- Young, Gifted and Broke (1989), ITV
- The Young Ones (1982–84), BBC Two

== United States ==
- 10 Things I Hate About You (2009–10), ABC Family
- 100 Deeds for Eddie McDowd (1999–2002), Nickelodeon
- 100 Things to Do Before High School (2014–16), Nickelodeon
- A.N.T. Farm (2011–14), Disney Channel
- The Adventures of Pete & Pete (1993–96), Nickelodeon
- Alexa & Katie (2018–20), Netflix
- Alien Dawn (2013–14), Nickelodeon, TeenNick
- Aliens in America (2007–08), The CW
- All About Us (2001), NBC
- All Grown Up! (2003–08), Nickelodeon
- All Night (2018), Hulu
- American Vandal (2017–18), Netflix
- Andi Mack (2017–19), Disney Channel
- The Archie Show (1968–1969), CBS
- As the Bell Rings (2007–09), Disney Channel
- The Astronauts (2020–21), Nickelodeon
- Austin & Ally (2011–16), Disney Channel
- Awkward (2011–16), MTV
- Beavis and Butt-Head (1993–97, 2011, 2022–present) MTV, Paramount+, Comedy Central
- Bella and the Bulldogs (2015–16), Nickelodeon
- Best Friends Whenever (2015–16), Disney Channel
- Best.Worst.Weekend.Ever. (2018), Netflix
- Better Days (1986), CBS
- Big Mouth (2017–25), Netflix
- Big Time Rush (2009–13), Nickelodeon
- Bill & Ted's Excellent Adventures (1992), Fox
- Bizaardvark (2016–19), Disney Channel
- Blossom (1990–95), NBC
- Blue Mountain State (2010–11), Spike TV
- Boo, Bitch (2022), Netflix
- Boy Meets World (1993–2000), ABC
- The Brady Bunch (1969-1974), ABC
- The Brady Kids (1972-1973), ABC
- The Brothers García (2000–04), Nickelodeon
- Brothers and Sisters (1979), NBC
- Brutally Normal (2000), The WB
- Bucket & Skinner's Epic Adventures (2011–13), Nickelodeon, TeenNick
- Bunk'd (2015–24), Disney Channel
- Cake (2006), CBS
- California Dreams (1992–96), NBC
- Chad (2021–24), TBS
- Crash & Bernstein (2012–14), Disney XD
- City Guys (1997–2001), NBC
- Clarissa Explains It All (1991–94), Nickelodeon
- Clueless (1996–99), ABC, UPN
- Co-Ed Fever (1979), CBS
- Complete Savages (2004–05), ABC
- Coop & Cami Ask the World (2018–20), Disney Channel
- Cory in the House (2007–08), Disney Channel
- Cousin Skeeter (1998–2001), Nickelodeon
- Critters: A New Binge (2019), Shudder
- Danger Force (2020–24), Nickelodeon
- Daria (1997–2002), MTV
- Dead End: Paranormal Park (2022), Netflix
- Delta House (1979), ABC
- Diary of a Future President (2020–21), Disney+
- A Different World (1987–93), NBC
- A Different World (2026–present), Netflix
- Do Over (2002), The WB
- Dog with a Blog (2012–15), Disney Channel
- Double Trouble (1984–85), NBC
- Drake & Josh (2004–07), Nickelodeon
- Drama Club (2021), Nickelodeon
- Duncanville (2020–22), Fox
- Electric Bloom (2025–present), Disney Channel
- Erin & Aaron (2023), Nickelodeon
- Even Stevens (2000–03), Disney Channel
- Every Witch Way (2014–15), Nickelodeon
- Everybody Hates Chris (2005–09), UPN, The CW
- Everything's Gonna Be Okay (2020–21), Freeform
- The Expanding Universe of Ashley Garcia (2020), Netflix
- The Facts of Life (1979–88), NBC
- Fairfax (2021–22), Amazon Prime Video
- Faking It (2014–16), MTV
- Family Matters (1989–98), ABC, CBS
- Fast Layne (2019), Disney Channel
- Fast Times (1986), CBS
- Ferris Bueller (1990), NBC
- Filthy Preppy Teen$ (2016), Fullscreen
- Fish Hooks (2010–14), Disney Channel
- Fred: The Show (2012), Nickelodeon
- Free for All (2003), Showtime
- The Fresh Prince of Bel-Air (1990–96), NBC
- Full House (1987–95), ABC
- Fuller House (2016–20), Netflix
- Gabby Duran & the Unsittables (2019–21), Disney Channel
- Gamer's Guide to Pretty Much Everything (2015–17), Disney XD
- Game Shakers (2015–19), Nickelodeon
- Gidget (1965–66), ABC
- Girl Meets World (2014–17), Disney Channel
- Go Fish (2001), NBC
- The Goldbergs (2013–23), ABC
- Good Luck Charlie (2010–14), Disney Channel
- Good Morning, Miss Bliss (1988–89), Disney Channel
- Good Vibes (2011), MTV
- Gordita Chronicles (2022), HBO Max
- Gortimer Gibbon's Life on Normal Street (2014–16), Amazon Prime Video
- Grachi (2011–13), Nickelodeon Latin America
- Great Scott! (1992), Fox
- Grosse Pointe (2000–01), The WB
- Grown-ish (2018–24), Freeform
- Hang Time (1995–2000), NBC
- Hank (1965–66), NBC
- Hannah Montana (2006–11), Disney Channel
- Happy Days (1974–84), ABC
- Happyland (2014), MTV
- The Hard Times of RJ Berger (2010–11), MTV
- The Haunted Hathaways (2013–15), Nickelodeon
- Head of the Class (1986–91), ABC
- Head of the Class (2021), HBO Max
- Henry Danger (2014–20), Nickelodeon
- Hey Dude (1989–91), Nickelodeon
- High School USA! (2013), Fox
- Hollywood Arts (2026–present), Netflix
- Hoops (2020), Netflix
- How to Rock (2012), Nickelodeon
- Hunter Street (2017–21), Nickelodeon, TeenNick
- I Didn't Do It (2014–15), Disney Channel
- I'm in the Band (2009–11), Disney XD
- iCarly (2007–12), Nickelodeon
- The Inbetweeners (2012), MTV
- It's Your Move (1984–85), NBC
- The Jersey (1999–2004), Disney Channel
- Jessie (2011–15), Disney Channel
- Joe & Valerie (1978–79), NBC
- Jonas (2009–10), Disney Channel
- The Journey of Allen Strange (1997–2000), Nickelodeon
- Just for Kicks (2006), Nickelodeon
- Just Jordan (2007–08), Nickelodeon
- Karen (1964–65), NBC
- K.C. Undercover (2015–18), Disney Channel
- Kickin' It (2011–15), Disney XD
- Kenan & Kel (1996–2000), Nickelodeon
- The Kicks (2015–16), Amazon Prime Video
- The Kids From C.A.P.E.R. (1976–77), NBC
- Knight Squad (2018–19), Nickelodeon
- Lab Rats (2012–15), Disney XD
- Lab Rats: Elite Force (2016), Disney XD
- Legendary Dudas (2016), Nickelodeon
- Legends of Chamberlain Heights (2016–17), Comedy Central
- Level Up (2012–13), Cartoon Network
- Little Demon (2022), FXX
- Liv and Maddie (2013–17), Disney Channel
- Lizzie McGuire (2001–04), Disney Channel
- Lugar Heights (2001–08), mun2, MTV Tres
- Malcolm in the Middle (2000–06), Fox
- Malibu, CA (1998–2000), syndication
- Malibu Rescue (2019–20), Netflix
- The Many Loves of Dobie Gillis (1959–63), CBS
- Margie (1961–62), ABC
- Marvin Marvin (2012–13), Nickelodeon
- Max & Shred (2014–16), Nickelodeon
- Maybe It's Me (2001–02), The WB
- Meet Corliss Archer (1951), CBS
- Mighty Med (2013–15), Disney XD
- Minimum Wage (2026–present), Netflix
- Moesha (1996–2001), UPN
- Mr. Iglesias (2019–20), Netflix
- Mr. Student Body President (2016–18), go90
- My Brother and Me (1994–95), Nickelodeon
- My Wife and Kids (2001–05), ABC
- The Naked Brothers Band (2007–09), Nickelodeon
- Napoleon Dynamite (2012), Fox
- Ned's Declassified School Survival Guide (2004–07), Nickelodeon
- The New Adventures of Beans Baxter (1987–88), Fox
- The New Archies (1987), NBC
- No Good Nick (2019), Netflix
- Noah Knows Best (2000), Nickelodeon
- O'Grady (2004–06), The N
- Odd Man Out (1999–2000), ABC
- One on One (2001–06), UPN
- One World (1998–2001), NBC
- The Other Kingdom (2016), Nickelodeon
- Out of the Blue (1995–96), syndication
- Out of Jimmy's Head (2007–08), Cartoon Network
- Out of This World (1987–91), syndication
- Pair of Kings (2010–13), Disney XD
- Parker Lewis Can't Lose (1990–93), Fox
- Partners in Rhyme (2021–23), ALLBLK
- The Partridge Family (1970-1974), ABC
- The Patty Duke Show (1963–66), ABC
- Pepper Ann (1997–2000), ABC, UPN
- Phil of the Future (2004–06), Disney Channel
- The Popcorn Kid (1987), CBS
- Pretty Freekin Scary (2023), Disney Channel
- Primo (2023), Amazon Freevee
- Prince of Peoria (2018–19), Netflix
- Project Mc^{2} (2015–17), Netflix
- Raven's Home (2017–23), Disney Channel
- Resident Advisors (2015), Hulu
- Richie Rich (2015), Netflix
- Romeo! (2003–06), Nickelodeon
- Running the Halls (1993), NBC
- Sabrina the Teenage Witch (1996–2003), ABC, The WB
- Salute Your Shorts (1991–92), Nickelodeon
- Sam & Cat (2013–14), Nickelodeon
- Saturdays (2023), Disney Channel
- Saved by the Bell (1989–93), NBC
- Saved by the Bell (2020–21), Peacock
- Saved by the Bell: The College Years (1993–94), NBC
- Saved by the Bell: The New Class (1993–2000), NBC
- School of Rock (2016–18), Nickelodeon
- Scout's Safari (2002–04), Discovery Kids
- Shake It Up (2010–13), Disney Channel
- Side Hustle (2020–22), Nickelodeon
- Sister, Sister (1994–99), ABC, The WB
- Smart Guy (1997–99), The WB
- So Little Time (2001–02), Fox Family, ABC Family
- Son of Zorn (2016–17), Fox
- Sonny with a Chance (2009–11), Disney Channel
- Speechless (2016–19), ABC
- Spencer (1984–85), NBC
- Square Pegs (1982–83), CBS
- Star Falls (2018), Nickelodeon, TeenNick
- Step by Step (1991–98), ABC, CBS
- Stuck in the Middle (2016–18), Disney Channel
- Suburgatory (2011–14), ABC
- The Suite Life of Zack & Cody (2005–08), Disney Channel
- The Suite Life on Deck (2008–11), Disney Channel
- Supah Ninjas (2011–13), Nickelodeon
- Sydney to the Max (2019–21), Disney Channel
- Taina (2001–02), Nickelodeon
- Take Note (2022), Peacock
- Talia in the Kitchen (2015), Nickelodeon
- Team Kaylie (2019–20), Netflix
- Ted (2024–26), Peacock
- Teen Angel (1997–98), ABC
- That '70s Show (1998–2006), Fox
- That '90s Show (2023–2024), Netflix
- That Girl Lay Lay (2021–24), Nickelodeon
- That's So Raven (2003–07), Disney Channel
- The Thundermans (2013–18) Nickelodeon
- The Troop (2009–13), Nickelodeon, TeenNick
- True Jackson, VP (2008–11), Nickelodeon
- Tucker (2000–01), NBC
- Two of a Kind (1998–99), ABC
- Ultra Violet & Black Scorpion (2022), Disney Channel
- Undeclared (2001–02), Fox
- Undergrads (2001), MTV
- Unfabulous (2004–07), Nickelodeon
- Unsupervised (2012), FX
- USA High (1997–99), USA
- Vampirina: Teenage Vampire (2025–present), Disney Channel
- Velma (2023–2024), HBO Max
- Victorious (2010–13), Nickelodeon
- The Villains of Valley View (2022–23), Disney Channel
- The Wannabes (2009–11), Starz Kids & Family
- Warped! (2022), Nickelodeon
- Weird Science (1994–98), USA
- Welcome Back, Kotter (1975–79), ABC
- Welcome Freshmen (1991–93), Nickelodeon
- Wet Hot American Summer: First Day of Camp (2015), Netflix
- What I Like About You (2002–06), The WB
- What's Happening!! (1976–79), ABC
- WITS Academy (2015), Nickelodeon
- Wizards Beyond Waverly Place (2024–26), Disney Channel
- Wizards of Waverly Place (2007–12), Disney Channel
- The Wonder Years (1988–93), ABC
- The Wonder Years (2021–23), ABC
- Young Rock (2021–23), NBC
- Zach Stone Is Gonna Be Famous (2013), MTV
- Zeke and Luther (2009–12), Disney XD
- Zoe, Duncan, Jack and Jane (1999–2000), The WB
- Zoey 101 (2005–08), Nickelodeon

== Venezuela ==
- Isa TKM (2008–10), Nickelodeon Latin America
- NPS: No puede ser (2011), Venevisión, Boomerang

== Other countries ==
- Czech Republic – Sex O'Clock (2023–25), Voyo
- Finland – Äijä (2025–present), Yle Areena
- Poland – Do dzwonka (2010–12), Disney Channel Poland
- Portugal – Floribella (2006–08), SIC
- Russia – As the Bell Rings (2010–12), Disney Channel Russia
- Singapore – As the Bell Rings (2007), Disney Channel Asia
- Sweden – När klockan ringer (2010–11), Disney Channel Scandinavia
- Taiwan – As the Bell Rings (2012–13), Disney Channel Asia
- Turkey – Zil Çalınca (2012–13), Disney Channel Turkey
- Ukraine – Kuratory (2018), UFO TV

== See also ==
- Teen sitcom
- Teen drama — (List of teen dramas)
- Teen films — (List of teen films)
- Teen pop
- Teen magazine — (List of teen magazines)
