= As the Bell Rings =

Disney Channel franchise

As the Bell Rings is a Disney Channel short franchise, based on the original Disney Channel Italian series Quelli dell'intervallo, that has been adapted for numerous other markets worldwide:

== As the Bell Rings franchise ==
=== Original version ===
Region/Country	Local name	Language	Network	Seasons	Date premiered	Date ended
Italy	Quelli dell'intervallo	Italian	Disney Channel Italy	7	4 September 2005	26 December 2008

=== Other versions ===
A range of Disney Channel networks aired these versions in various regions and countries in different local languages. The number of seasons for which these versions were aired also varied, from one to five seasons.

Region/Country	Local name	Language	Network	Seasons	Date premiered	Date ended
Argentina	Cuando toca la campana	Spanish	Disney Channel Latin America	2	28 February 2011	15 December 2012
Australia	As the Bell Rings	English	Disney Channel Australia	4	24 September 2007	7 June 2011
Belgium; Netherlands	Als De Bel Gaat	Dutch	Disney Channel (Netherlands)	1	7 June 2009	30 November 2009
Brazil	Quando Toca o Sino	Portuguese	Disney Channel Brazil	3	23 March 2009	21 December 2012
China	Kè jiān hǎo shíguāng	Mandarin	Dragon Club	4	24 March 2007	25 July 2011
Denmark; Sweden	Når klokken ringer	Danish / Swedish (recorded in two languages)	Disney Channel Denmark	2	26 February 2010	10 June 2011
France	Trop la Classe!	French	Disney Channel France	5	10 April 2006	19 November 2010
Germany	Kurze Pause	German	Disney Channel Germany	4	18 September 2006	8 September 2009
India	Break Time Masti Time	Hindi	Disney Channel India	2	6 October 2008	30 January 2009
Israel	אחריהצלצול(סדרת טלוויזיה ישראלית)	Hebrew	Disney Channel Israel	1	1 March 2010	9 November 2010
Japan	The Yasumi Jikan	Japanese	Disney Channel Japan	2	2 February 2010	5 July 2011
Malaysia	Waktu Rehat	Malay	Disney Channel Asia	3	31 August 2010	21 July 2012
Poland	Do dzwonka	Polish	Disney Channel Poland	2	7 November 2010	30 June 2012
Russia	Prikoly na peremenke	Russian	Disney Channel Russia	3	1 January 2010	25 May 2012
Singapore	As the Bell Rings	English	Disney Channel Asia	1	20 February 2007	12 August 2007
Spain	Cambio de Clase	Spanish	Disney Channel Spain	4	11 September 2006	21 February 2009
Taiwan	Kè jiān hǎo shíguāng Yī nián Èr bān	Mandarin	Disney Channel Asia	2	6 February 2012	6 January 2013
Turkey	Zil Çalınca	Turkish	Disney Channel Turkey	2	23 April 2012	22 June 2013
United Kingdom	As the Bell Rings	English	Disney Channel UK	2	2 April 2007	4 July 2008
United States	As the Bell Rings	English	Disney Channel	2	26 August 2007	19 April 2009
