= Trinks =

Trinks is a surname. Notable people with the surname include:

- Benjamin Trinks (born 1990), German actor
- Constantin Trinks (born 1975), German conductor
- Florian Trinks (born 1992), German footballer
- Willibald Trinks (1874–1966), German-American mechanical engineer
