= Andrea Guasch =

Spanish actress, singer, composer, and dancer (born 1990)

- Born: Andrea Guasch Selva; December 20, 1990 (age 35); Barcelona, Catalonia, Spain
- Origin: Barcelona, Spain
- Genres: Pop; Latin pop
- Occupations: Actress; singer; composer; dancer
- Years active: 1998–present
- Spouse: Rubén Tajuelo "Rosco" (m. 2022)
- Website: andreaguasch.es

Andrea Guasch Selva (born 20 December 1990) is a Spanish actress, singer, composer, and dancer from Barcelona. She gained prominence as a Disney Channel star in the 2000s and has since established herself as a versatile performer in television, theatre, and music. She is known for her historic performance on Tu cara me suena (2023), where she won five galas, and as one half of the musical duo Hotel Flamingo with her husband Rubén Tajuelo "Rosco".

== Early life and career beginnings ==
At the age of 5, she began training in classical dance and jazz as well as breakdance, tap, and contemporary dance. In October 2007, she passed the Intermediate level exam of the Royal Academy of Dance with a Merit grade. As a child, she spent several years as a model in advertising, appearing in almost a hundred commercials, before continuing as a performing arts actress.

== Career ==
=== Disney Channel era (2006–2011) ===
Starting in June 2006, she starred in the Disney Channel youth series Cambio de clase during its three seasons, appearing in 104 of the 131 episodes that were broadcast. The series was an adaptation of an Italian production where Guasch played the character Valentina. Also on the same television channel, in 2007 she hosted the contest Baila conmigo, where she taught viewers the most famous choreographies from Disney Channel movies. In April 2007, she participated in the international event Disney Channel Games 2007 held in Orlando and also competed in the next edition of the Disney Channel Games 2008.

In January 2008, she made her debut as a singer with the Spanish version of the song Nada es lo que parece ser, the opening theme for the Disney Channel series Wizards of Waverly Place. In August 2008, she appeared in 2 episodes of the series Disney's Kurze Pause.

Later, also with The Walt Disney Company, she starred in the Spanish series La gira, which premiered in March 2011. She remained in the series for its two seasons, playing the role of Sara Cuervo.

=== Television and film career ===
In December 2008 and January 2009, she appeared in 3 episodes of the series Acusados on Telecinco. Later, in June 2009, she appeared in 2 episodes of the third season of Sin tetas no hay paraíso. During those years, between October and December 2009, she also participated in the filming of Punta Escarlata, a thriller series produced by Globomedia and Cuatro that premiered in 2010.

In 2018, she acted in the digital series Wake Up broadcast on the Playz platform, playing the character of Dalia. A year later, she made a cameo in an episode of the third season of Paquita Salas (Netflix) as a hostess at a party. In 2021, she was one of the protagonists of the series Todo lo otro on HBO Max.

From 2023 to 2024, she appeared in the long-running Spanish series Amar es para siempre as Alicia Crespo Sunner, appearing in 143 episodes. In 2024, she also appeared in 4 episodes of the series 4 estrellas on La 1.

=== Theatre ===
Between 2013 and 2014, she returned to theater to star in the musical Hoy no me puedo levantar as the character María.

In May 2018, she joined the cast of the musical La llamada, by Javier Ambrossi and Javier Calvo, in its fifth season, in the lead role of María Casado, alternating the character with Nerea Rodríguez.

=== Music career ===
==== Hotel Flamingo ====
In 2019, Andrea Guasch formed the musical duo Hotel Flamingo with her husband Rubén Tajuelo "Rosco". The duo is known for their pop sound and intimate acoustic performances.

=== Tu cara me suena (2023) ===
In 2023, Andrea Guasch participated in the tenth season of Tu cara me suena on Antena 3, becoming one of the most successful contestants in the show's history. She won five galas during the season, setting a historic record, and finished as runner-up in the final. Her notable performances included impersonations of Chanel Terrero (performing "SloMo"), Beyoncé, The Bangles, Halsey, and Mónica Naranjo. Her opening performance as Chanel earned her a perfect score and widespread acclaim. She occasionally performed alongside her husband Rosco in duet performances.

=== Recent work (2024–2025) ===
In 2024, Guasch served as one of the hosts for the Premios de la Academia de Música alongside Abril Zamora, Ángel Carmona, and Johann Wald. She has continued to make appearances at high-profile events including the Premios Condé Nast Traveler 2025, and the GQ & Azzaro Summer Party 2025.

== Personal life ==
Andrea Guasch married Rubén Tajuelo "Rosco" in 2022 in a boho-style ceremony. The couple had met and married in Las Vegas after knowing each other for only three months. They currently reside in Madrid and perform together as the musical duo Hotel Flamingo.

== Filmography ==
=== Film ===
Year	Title	Role	Notes
2002	Dalí être Dieu	Cécile	TV Movie
2010	¡Primaria!	Mother of Child	Feature film
2020	Mi Gran Despedida	Candelaria	Feature film
2024	Una perra andaluza		Feature film

=== Television ===
Year	Title	Role	Episodes	Network
2002	Dalí être Dieu	Cécile	1	TV Movie
2003	Javier ya no vive solo	María	1 episode	Telecinco
2003	L'orquestra de les estrelles	Núria	1	TV3
2004–2005	De moda	Lidia	7 episodes	Telecinco
2006	El comisario	Cynthia	1 episode	Telecinco
2006–2009	Cambio de clase	Valentina	104 episodes	Disney Channel
2007	MIR	Paloma	1 episode	Telecinco
2007	Hospital Central	Vanesa	1 episode	Telecinco
2007	Cuenta atrás	Claudia	1 episode	Cuatro
2007	Cuéntame cómo pasó	Isa	3 episodes	La 1
2008	Disneys kurze Pause	Valentina	2 episodes	Disney Channel
2009	Acusados	Ana Sánchez	3 episodes	Telecinco
2009	Sin tetas no hay paraíso	Dunia	2 episodes	Telecinco
2011–2013	La Gira	Sara Cuervo	51 episodes	Disney Channel
2011	Vida de Cuervo: ¡Pillados!	Sara Cuervo	12 episodes	Disney Channel
2011	Punta Escarlata	Icíar Lozano	9 episodes	Telecinco
2018	Wake Up	Dalia	6 episodes	Playz
2019	Paquita Salas	Azafata	1 episode	Netflix
2020–2021	Mercado central	Susana	14 episodes	La 1
2021	Valeria	Aina Andradas	1 episode	Netflix
2021	Todo lo otro	Martina	8 episodes	HBO Max
2023–2024	Amar es para siempre	Alicia Crespo Sunner	143 episodes	Antena 3
2024	4 estrellas	Rachel	4 episodes	La 1

=== Programs ===
Year	Program	Role	Network
2007	Baila conmigo	Host	Disney Channel
2023	Tu cara me suena (Season 10)	Contestant	Antena 3
2024	Premios de la Academia de Música	Host	

== Discography ==
=== As Hotel Flamingo ===
- "Discos y Vinilos" (2019)
- "Lleva tu nombre" (2019)
- "Quedan balas" (2023)
- "Soy Mejor" (2024)
- "Zorra" (2024)

=== Solo ===
- "Nada es lo que parece ser" (Spanish version) (2008)

== Awards and recognition ==
Year	Award	Category	Work	Result
2023	Tu cara me suena	Gala Winner	5 victories	Won
2023	Tu cara me suena	Season Finalist	Season 10	Nominated (Runner-up)
