= As the Bell Rings (Australian TV series) =

Australian television series

- Country of origin: Australia
- Original language: English
- No. of seasons: 4
- No. of episodes: 95

Production
- Running time: Approx 6 minutes
- Production company: FremantleMedia Australia

Original release
- Network: Disney Channel
- Release: 24 September 2007 – 7 June 2011

As the Bell Rings is a Disney Channel Australia original interstitial program which ran from 2007 to 2011. The format is a selection of short live-action comedy sequences. It is an Australian adaptation of the Disney Channel Italy Original Series Quelli dell'intervallo, and was recognised as Most Outstanding Short Form Program at the ASTRA Awards in 2009.

== Cast and characters ==
=== Characters ===
- Jonesy (Jack Pearson): Jonesy is a corrupt doofus. He's always getting into trouble more than anybody else. His best friend is Raff and he's desperately in love with Amber. His younger sister Annie humiliates him most of the time. He's not as cool as Annie. He has appeared in nearly all of the episodes. He's the tallest characters of the cast.
- Raff (Deniz Akdeniz): Raff is an average lieutenant. He's a sporty kid who gets into trouble, like his best friend Jonesy. In an interview with the cast, he said that his favourite moment was when he and Jack finished their handshake for the whole series.
- Amber (Alicia Banit): Amber is a girl of fashion. She gets very upset when Jonesy asks her out on a date. In an interview with the cast, Banit said that her favourite episode was when Jonesy dressed up as a girl and said that it was the funniest thing she's ever seen.
- Annie (Tessa Whelan): Annie is Jonesy's cooler younger sister. She tries to help Jonesy go on a kill with Amber but she humiliates him most of the time. She likes Raff, Jonesy's best friend. She's the shortest member of the cast. She does not appear in the second season.
- Parker (Bardiya McKinnon): Parker is a geeky soldier who likes Haley and tries to impress her. He's actually an alien from another planet as seen in at the end of one of the episodes. In an interview with the cast, McKinnon said that his favourite episode was when he dressed up as a rockstar.
- DJ (Sianoa Smit-McPhee): DJ is very bright, energetic soldier and talks too much. She could easily drive anyone crazy with her talking. Most of the time she mentions she has a little sister. She does not appear in the second season.
- S.A.M. (Aleksa Kurbalija): S.A.M. is the school major and dobs on all the kids. No one really likes him and his worst enemies are Jonesy and Raff.
- Haley (Nicole Gulasekharam): Haley is sort of an terrorism to everyone. She tries to be really nice to people.
- Rusty (Max Pfiefer): Rusty is the school joker. He doesn't get into a lot of trouble like Jonesy. He uses different voices most of the time. In an interview with the cast, Pfiefer said that his favourite episode was when he broke the school statue and dressed up as the statue to avoid getting in trouble with the principal.
- Rocky (Rhiannon Fish): Rocky likes to humiliate and is always wearing sport clothes. She's pretty full of herself and can scare boys with her strength.
- Vince (Christian Antidormi): Vince is the sporty one, that replaces Raff. The girls also think he is good looking when he arrives, but later criticise him in every way possible.
- Tina (Kiane O'Farrell)
- Zoe (Allegra Fleming)
- Eddie (James Campbell)
- Marcus (Rowan Hills)
- Mia (Tori Bailey): Mia is a new character introduced in the fourth season. She is a loud soap singer that plays guitar.
- Principal (voiceover) (Michael Bishop): He knows when the kids are being naughty. His voice is only heard through the loudspeaker but has been seen in two episodes.

In season 3 five new characters were added: Vince, Tina, Zoe, Eddie and Marcus.

Season 4 of As the Bell Rings featured a new character, Mia. Tori Bailey, who portrayed Mia, won the Australia and New Zealand Disney Casting Call Competition. She was one of five finalists who went into the studio and met with some of the As the Bell Rings crew. Bailey receiving the phone call that she had won the competition was featured as a special break-filler on Disney Channel Australia.

=== Cast ===
Actor	Character	Seasons	Years
Jack Pearson	Paul Jones (Jonesy)	1–2	2007–09
Deniz Akdeniz	Raffael (Raff)	1–2	2007–09
Max Pfiefer	Rusty	1–2	2007–09
Clae Whitelaw	Miller	1	2007–08
Martin Quinn	Spud	1	2007–08
Bardiya McKinnon	Parker	1–4	2007–11
Aleksa Kurbalija	S.A.M. Tipping	1–4	2007–11
Alicia Banit	Amber	1–4	2007–11
Nicole Gulasekharam	Haley	1–4	2007–11
Sianoa Smit-McPhee	DJ	1	2007–08
Rhiannon Fish	Rocky	1–2	2007–09
Tessa Whelan	Annie	1	2007–08
Tom Jordan	Dylan	2	2009
Amelia Reynolds	Lara	2	2009
Zoe Agtoft	Chloe	1	2007–08 (recurring)
Zachary Sheehan	Tommy	1	2007–08 (recurring)
James Campbell	Eddie	3–4	2009–11
Rowan Hills	Marcus	3–4	2009–11
Kiane O'Farrell	Tina	3–4	2009–11
Allegra Fleming	Zoe	3–4	2009–11
Christian Antidormi	Vince	3–4	2009–11
Tori Bailey	Mia	4	2010–11

== Broadcast ==
The series premiered on 24 September 2007 and screened on weekdays at 5:25 pm between The Suite Life on Deck/Wizards of Waverly Place and Hannah Montana. The shorts have also been repeated after movies and TV series. Season 2 aired between 2 January 2009 and 14 September 2009. Season 3, which included new cast members, completed filming on 17 July 2009, and premiered on 2 October 2009 running through 16 April 2010. A fourth season started filming in June 2010 and ended production in October 2010, and aired between 11 February 2011 and 17 June 2011.

== Episodes ==
=== Series overview ===
Series	Episodes	Originally released	
Series	Episodes	First released	Last released
1	26	24 September 2007	2008
2	26	2 January 2009	14 September 2009
3	25	2 October 2009	16 April 2010
4	18	11 February 2011	17 June 2011

The Australian version is similar to the United Kingdom version except the school is called Paterson High, the names of the characters are different and there is no laugh track. At the end of each episode they show bloopers of the actors. All of the characters are from Melbourne, except for Parker (Bardiya McKinnon) who is from Sydney and DJ (Sianoa Smit-McPhee) who is from Adelaide.

As the Bell Rings was filmed at Docklands Studios Melbourne.

=== Season 1 (2007–08) ===
No. overall	No. in season	Title	Original release date
1	1	"1.1" "One Strange Sandwich"	24 September 2007
2	2	"1.2"	2007
3	3	"1.3" "A Touch of Class"	2007
4	4	"1.4"	2007
5	5	"1.5"	2007
6	6	"1.6"	2007
7	7	"1.7"	2007
8	8	"1.8"	2007
9	9	"1.9"	2007
10	10	"1.10"	2007
11	11	"1.11"	2007
12	12	"1.12"	2007
13	13	"1.13"	2007
14	14	"1.14"	2007
15	15	"1.15"	2008
16	16	"1.16"	2008
17	17	"1.17"	2008
18	18	"1.18"	2008
19	19	"1.19"	2008
20	20	"1.20"	2008
21	21	"1.21" "Oh Romeo"	2008
22	22	"1.22"	2008
23	23	"1.23"	2008
24	24	"1.24"	2008
25	25	"1.25"	2008
26	26	"1.26"	2008

=== Season 2 (2009) ===
No. overall	No. in season	Title	Original release date
27	1	"Amber the Nerd"	2 January 2009
28	2	"Careers Week"	11 August 2009
29	3	"CSI Paterson High"	12 August 2009
30	4	"Fame Goes to Sam's Head"	13 August 2009
31	5	"Family Tree"	14 August 2009
32	6	"Has Anyone Seen Rusty?"	17 August 2009
33	7	"Hot Gossip"	18 August 2009
34	8	"Hypnosis"	19 August 2009
35	9	"I Bet You Think This Song Is About You"	20 August 2009
36	10	"School Musical"	20 August 2009
37	11	"MC Parker"	24 August 2009
38	12	"Parker the Wizard"	25 August 2009
39	13	"Raff the Expert"	26 August 2009
40	14	"Robo Raff"	27 August 2009
41	15	"Rusty Vs Rocky"	28 August 2009
42	16	"Save Raff"	31 August 2009
43	17	"The Music Video"	1 September 2009
44	18	"So You Think You Can Think"	2 September 2009
45	19	"The Bully"	3 September 2009
46	20	"The Weather Makers"	4 September 2009
47	21	"Vote Now"	7 September 2009
48	22	"Shoes"	8 September 2009
49	23	"Students Exposed!"	9 September 2009
50	24	"The Extemousenator"	10 September 2009
51	25	"Time Capsule"	11 September 2009
52	26	"Valentine's Day Card"	14 September 2009

=== Season 3 (2009–10) ===
No. overall	No. in season	Title	Original release date
53	1	"Dance Fever"	2 October 2009
54	2	"Extra! Extra! Parker Loves Zoe"	9 October 2009
55	3	"The Talking Cockatoo"	9 October 2009
56	4	"The School Play"	16 October 2009
57	5	"Dance Battle"	23 October 2009
58	6	"Exchange Student"	30 October 2009
59	7	"Battle of the Bands"	6 November 2009
60	8	"The School Song"	20 November 2009
61	9	"Newspaper-itis"	27 November 2009
62	10	"He's My Sister"	4 December 2009
63	11	"Vince the Astronaut"	11 December 2009
64	12	"Bizarro Patterson High"	18 December 2009
65	13	"Dylan's Musical Crisis"	4 January 2010
66	14	"Whacky Teacher"	11 January 2010
67	15	"The Short Film"	22 January 2010
68	16	"Student of the Week"	29 January 2010
69	17	"Personality Swap"	12 February 2010
70	18	"Patterson FM"	19 February 2010
71	19	"Haley Chases Vince"	26 February 2010
72	20	"Chill Out Sam"	5 March 2010
73	21	"Amber's Everywhere"	12 March 2010
74	22	"Grow Up Mum"	19 March 2010
75	23	"School Formal"	26 March 2010
76	24	"Parker Quits Science"	9 April 2010
77	25	"Great Escape"	16 April 2010

=== Season 4 (2011) ===
No. overall	No. in season	Title	Original release date
78	1	"Mia's Jingle"	11 February 2011
79	2	"Mia the Tutor"	18 February 2011
80	3	"Boss from Hell"	25 February 2011
81	4	"Geek Week Magazine"	4 March 2011
82	5	"Leg Swap"	11 March 2011
83	6	"Hayley's Comet"	18 March 2011
84	7	"The Braniac"	25 March 2011
85	8	"Boys vs Girls"	1 April 2011
86	9	"The New Tuckshop Lady"	8 April 2011
87	10	"Hayley Needs a Hobby"	15 April 2011
88	11	"Ask the Statue"	22 April 2011
89	12	"The Heist"	29 April 2011
90	13	"Sam the Rule Breaker"	6 May 2011
91	14	"Eddie the Magnificent"	13 May 2011
92	15	"Amber Gets Jealous"	20 May 2011
93	16	"The Science Competition"	27 May 2011
94	17	"Dream Helmet"	3 June 2011
95	18	"Poetry Fest"	17 June 2011

== See also ==
- Kurze Pause
- Cambio de Clase
- Trop la Classe
