= Dress to Impress (disambiguation) =

Dress to Impress is a 2023 multiplayer dress-up video game on Roblox.

Dress to Impress may also refer to:

== Music ==
- Dress to Impress (album), by Keith Sweat, 2016
- "Dress to Impress", a 2018 song by Mavado

== Television ==
- "Dress to Impress", an episode of American TV series As the Bell Rings
- "Dress to Impress", an episode of British TV series Moving On
- "Dress to Impress", an episode of American game show Perfect Score
- "Dress to Impress", an episode of American TV series Roseanne

== See also ==
- "Dress 2 Impress", a 2021 song by Dani M
