= Miray Daner =

Turkish actress and model (born 1999)

- Born: Miray Daner; 15 January 1999 (age 27); Istanbul, Turkey
- Occupation: Actress/Model
- Years active: 2006–present
- Relatives: Aras Bulut İynemli (cousin)

Miray Naz Daner (born 15 January 1999) is a Turkish actress and model. She is best known for her role in the TV series Hudutsuz Sevda as Zeynep Leto. She also played "Hilal" in Vatanım Sensin, a series about the Turkish War of Independence and won a Golden Butterfly Award for her role in it.

== Life and career ==
Daner began her career at the age of seven as child actor. In 2013, she studied in English Preparatory Class of Cemal Reşit Rey Fine Arts High School for one year. She studied cello, piano, and singing in the Music Department of Cemal Reşit Rey Fine Arts High School and studied her final year in the Music Department of Mimar Sinan Fine Arts High School but she left the fine arts high school due to absences and is going to finish her education by distance education. Among her paternal relatives are actors Aras Bulut İynemli (cousin), Orçun İynemli (cousin), Cengiz Daner (uncle), and İlhan Daner (great uncle). She has an older sister, fashion designer İpek Nur Daner. Her maternal grandfather is one of the Turks who immigrated from Greece to Turkey due to war.

Beginning at the age of nine, she played in 121 episodes in Papatyam as "Gonca", opposite Metin Akpınar who is cited as one of the best actors in Turkish cinema. She portrayed Sabiha Gökçen, the world's first female fighter pilot, Turkish pilot and foster child of Mustafa Kemal Atatürk in her first movie Dersimiz Atatürk with Halit Ergenç, and later played in the film Çınar Ağacı among a starred ensemble cast. Her other roles include "Doll Nergis" (her first role) in an episode of popular fantastic series Bez Bebek, and "Young Zeynep" in an episode of hit comedy series 1 Kadın 1 Erkek. She also played in theatre "Sürç-i Lisan Etti-isek Affola" and commercials.

At the age of thirteen, she played her first lead role in Zil Çalınca, the first Turkish series of Disney Channel and an adaptation of As The Bell Rings. She appeared as herself in the short movie Zil Çalınca Avı. She played opposite Cihan Şimşek for the fifth time in Merhaba Hayat, an adaptation of Private Practice and Medcezir, an adaptation of The O.C. series. She also had a role in the film Arkadaşım Max, starring a dog named Max. Since childhood, she has played characters in various genres including comedy, fantastic, biography, and drama.

At the age of seventeen, she played "Hilal" in Vatanım Sensin, a series about the Turkish War of Independence. She won a Golden Butterfly Award for her role in the series. She had leading role as Helen in spin off series "Saygı: Bir Ercüment Çözer Dizisi" of Behzat Ç. with Boran Kuzum for fourth times. She joined Netflix fantasy series Hakan: Muhafız.

She starred in the movie Hürkuş, based on the life of aviator Vecihi Hürkuş. Daner had the leading role in series Bir Litre Gözyaşı as Cihan. She performed in short modern theatre adaptation of "Romeo & Juliet" which released in Dijital Sahne.

She played in series "Kara Tahta" and "Kuş Uçuşu".

In 2023, she began starring as Zeynep Leto in the television drama Hudutsuz Sevda, alongside Deniz Can Aktaş.

Miray Daner has been involved in a romantic relationship with former player of The Turkey national under-18 football team, Oğulcan Engin, who is the son of famous singer Seda Sayan and football player Sinan Engin.

== Theatre ==
Year	Title	Role	Venue
2010	Sürç-i Lisan Etti-isek Affola		Ahali Theatre
2021	Romeo & Juliet	Juliet	Digital Stage

== Filmography ==
=== Film ===
Year	Film	Role	Note
2010	Dersimiz Atatürk	Sabiha Gökçen	
2011	Çınar Ağacı	Pelin	
2012	Zil Çalınca Avı	Herself	Short TV movie
2013	Arkadaşım Max	Melda	
2018	Hürkuş: Göklerdeki Kahraman	Selin	
2023	Life	Hicran	

=== Web series ===
Yıl	Series	Role	Episode
2012–2013	Zil Çalınca	Duygu	1–40
2019	Hakan Muhafız	Oracle	
2020–	Saygı	Helen	1–16
2022–2024	Kus Uçusu	Aslı Tuna	1–24
2026	Bize Bir Şey Olmaz	Lal	1–8
2026	aliKARA	Işik	1-10

=== TV series ===
Yıl	Series	Role	Episode
2008	Bez Bebek	Toy Nergis	1 (episode 53)
2008–2011	Papatyam	Gonca	1–121
2010	1 Kadın 1 Erkek	young Zeynep	1 (episode 98)
2012	Merhaba Hayat	Dünya	1–10
2013–2015	Medcezir	Beren Beylice	1–77
2016–2018	Vatanım Sensin	Hilal	1–59
2018–2019	Bir Litre Gözyaşı	Cihan Yürekli	1–15
2022	Kara Tahta	Irmak Güngör	1–20
2023–2025	Hudutsuz Sevda	Zeynep Leto	1–63

=== Music videos ===
- Bergüzar Korel - "Son Mektup"

== Awards ==
Year	Awards	Work	Result
2017	Golden Butterfly Awards – Shining Stars	Vatanım Sensin - Hilal	Won
2017	Golden Butterfly Awards – Best Couple	Vatanım Sensin - Miray Daner & Boran Kuzum	Won
2017	Turkey Youth and Student Platform – Young Actress of the Year	Vatanım Sensin - Hilal	Won
2017	Academic Quality – Best Young Actress of the Year	Vatanım Sensin - Hilal	Won
2017	Bilkent TV Awards – Best Partners	Vatanım Sensin - Miray Daner & Boran Kuzum	Won
2017	Crystal Screen Awards – Best Supporting Actors	Vatanım Sensin - Miray Daner & Boran Kuzum	Won
2017	Music Onair Awards – Best TV Actress	Vatanım Sensin - Hilal	Won
2018	KTÜ Media Awards – Best Debut by an Actress	Vatanım Sensin - Hilal	Won
2018	KTÜ Media Awards – Most Beautiful Actress	Vatanım Sensin - Miray Daner	Won
2018	Çorbada Tuzun Olsun – Best Debut by an Actress	Vatanım Sensin - Hilal	Won
2018	Çorbada Tuzun Olsun – Most Admired TV Couple of the Year	Vatanım Sensin - Miray Daner & Boran Kuzum	Won
