= Benjamin Trinks =

German actor and a voice actor (born 1990)

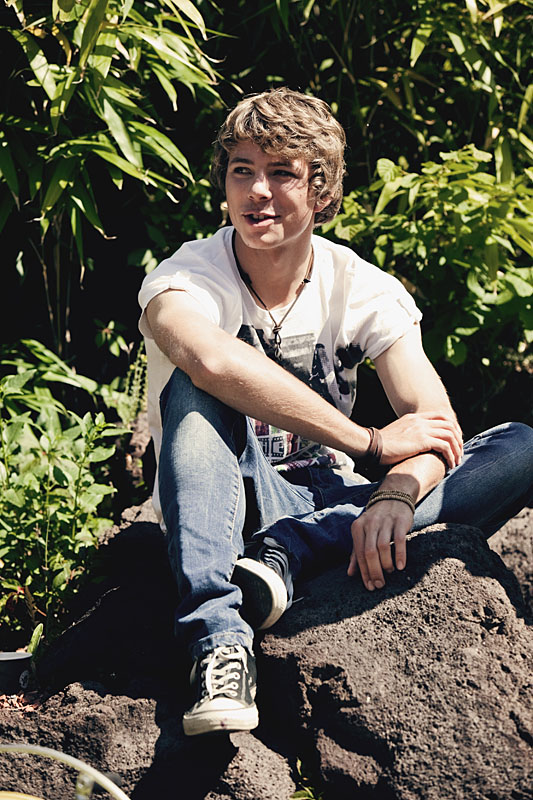
- Born: 15 October 1990 (age 35); Berlin, Germany
- Occupation: Actor
- Website: Official website

Benjamin Trinks (born 15 October 1990) is a German actor and voice actor.

== Biography ==
Benjamin Trinks was born in Berlin. At the age of eight, he was admitted to the child ensemble at the Friedrichstadt-Palast in Berlin, where he had his first experiences on stage in various revues. After appearing in music clips for Michael Schanze's variety shows, he came to the attention of TV executives. In 2004 he appeared in his first major television role in the ZDF series Sabine. Shortly after, roles followed in TV shows like ZACK (Sat.1) and Krimi.de (KI.KA).

Early in 2007, Trinks played Warrenville in the radio play a pact, a kiss and softy knee. At the same time he was filming the boarding school series Schloss Einstein as Nick, before appearing in the second series of Disney's Kurze Pause in April. The third series was shot during the summer of the same year. In addition, Trinks took part in an on-camera master class with Nancy Bishop, a US casting director. He also had a part in the Berlin edition of Tatort and the television series Die Stein.

On 29 November 2007, Trinks was the interview guest of Italian theatre star and singer Mafy on the Italian radio station radiosound 95. Both appeared in the sitcom Kurze Pause in their respective countries. Previously they had cooperated by presenting the live feed from the London premier of High School Musical 2.

Trinks was cast in the film The Reader, also starring Ralph Fiennes and Kate Winslet. He also appeared in the short film "Teacher".

== Filmography ==
- 2001: Clips with Michael Schanze
- 2001: Volkstümliche Hitparade
- 2003: Spot für Toleranz
- 2004: Krimi.de
- 2004: Lucky Punch
- 2004: Sabine
- 2004: Wo bleibst du Baby?
- 2004: ZACK
- 2005: ZACK
- 2006: Disneys Kurze Pause
- 2006: Unser Charly
- 2006: Disney Christmas Song Winterwunderzeit
- 2006: LEO - Ein fast perfekter Typ
- 2007: Disneys Kurze Pause 2
- 2007: Schloss Einstein
- 2007: Tatort
- 2007: High School Musical 2 - Premiere in London
- 2007: Disneys Kurze Pause 3
- 2007: Die Stein
- 2007: Lehrer (AT)
- 2008: Disney Channel Games - Florida
- 2008: Ich liebe den Mann meiner besten Freundin
- 2008: Camp Rock - We Rock
- 2009: Draußen am See
- 2009: Die Wette
- 2009: Familie Dr. Kleist
- 2009: The Reader
- 2009: Fairfield
- 2009: Vater, bin ich Kind?
- 2009: Allein unter Schülern
- 2010: Rauchfrei
- 2010: zaOza - Lass dich nicht ausbeuten
- 2010: Ampelmann
- 2011: Schicksalsjahre
- 2011: The Old Fox (Der Alte) - Der Tod und das Mädchen
- 2011: Der gestohlene Sommer
- 2012: Und alle haben geschwiegen
- 2012: Notruf Hafenkante - Unzertrennlich
- 2012: Terra X - Die Seefahrer der Bounty
- 2012: Mord in Ludwigslust
- 2013: Unsere Mütter, unsere Väter
- 2014: Ein Fall von Liebe - Annas Baby
- 2014: SOKO Wismar - Neptuns Rache
- 2014: Kripo Holstein - Bömmel kloppen
- 2014: Gut Molzow

== Synchronous work ==
- 2003: The Village; role: Junge
- 2004: Hitler in Colour; role: Wolfgang Findeisen
- 2005: Familie Dr. Kleist; role: Jacob
- 2005: Krimi.de; Teil 3; role: Rocky
- 2006: Disneys Weihnachtssong
- 2006: Titelsong Disneys Kurze Pause
- 2007: Ein Pakt, ein Kuss und weiche Knie; role: Warrenville
- 2007: Ferrero Fernsehspot Surprise Visit; role: Gastgeber
