= Do dzwonka =

- Starring: Agnieszka Doczyńska; Iga Krefft; Magdalena Osińska; Wojciech Rotowski; Marcin Turski; Piotr Janusz; Jakub Nowak; Jowita Ryczkowska
- Country of origin: Poland
- Original language: Polish
- No. of seasons: 2
- No. of episodes: 80

Production
- Production locations: Warsaw, Poland
- Running time: 5 minutes
- Production company: FremantleMedia

Original release
- Network: Disney Channel Poland
- Release: 7 November 2010 – 30 June 2012

Do dzwonka is a Polish television sitcom, originally aired by the Disney Channel Poland from 7 November 2010 to 30 June 2012. It is a Polish adaptation of the Disney Channel Italy series Quelli dell'intervallo.

== Cast and characters ==
=== Main ===
- Agnieszka Doczyńska as Dominika "Domi" — main character — she likes Mati and clothes
- Iga Krefft as Agnieaszka "Aga" — main character
- Magdalena Osińska as Natalia "Natka" — main character — she likes Seba; she is a vegetarian
- Wojciech Rotowski as Mateusz "Mati" — main character — he loves to play his guitar
- Marcin Turski as Sebastian "Seba" — main character — he likes Natka
- Piotr Janusz as Konrad — main character — he likes Domi
- Jakub Nowak as Tadeusz "Tadzio" — main character — he's a nerd
- Jowita Ryczkowska as Aldona — main character — she loves PE, has a crush on Tadzio
- Justyna Bojczuk as Beatka — main character in the second season
- Julia Chatys as Martyna — secondary character — she is Konrad's sister
- Karol Galos as Arek — secondary character
- Aleksander Witkowski as Maciek "Kudłaty" — secondary character

== Episodes ==
=== Series overview ===
Season	Episodes	Originally aired (Poland dates)	
Season	Episodes	Season premiere	Season finale
1	40	November 7, 2010	June 24, 2011
2	40	October 29, 2011	June 30, 2012

==== Season 1 (2010–2011) ====
No	Title	English title	Original air date
01	"Reklama"	"The Ad"	November 7, 2010
02	"Umów się ze mną"	"Go Out with Me"	November 7, 2010
03	"Piosenka"	"A Song for His Love"	November 9, 2010
04	"Pocałunek"	"Kiss"	November 11, 2010
05	"Nowy starszy brat"	"New Older Brother"	November 11, 2010
06	"Ćwiczenia Tadzia"	"Tadzio's Exercising"	November 13, 2010
07	"Nic już nie mów"	"Stop Talking Already"	November 14, 2010
08	"Wegetarianka"	"Going Vegetarian"	November 20, 2010
09	"Dziewczyna z okładki"	"The Heroine on the Cover"	November 21, 2010
10	"Czasopismo"	"The Magazine"	November 27, 2010
11	"Rozmowa Kontrolowana"	"Controlled Conversation"	November 28, 2010
12	"Mikołajki"	"Dream Presents"	December 5, 2010
13	"Mięśniak"	"Strongman"	December 12, 2010
14	"Dziewczyna w drużynie"	"A Girl in the Team"	December 12, 2010
15	"Najstarszy uczeń"	"The Oldest Student"	December 18, 2010
16	"Randka Agi"	"Aga's Date"	December 22, 2010
17	"Tajemnice damskiej toalety"	"Secrets of the Ladies' Room"	December 22, 2010
18	"Król parkietu"	"King of the Dance Floor"	December 25, 2010
19	"Długi"	"Obligation"	January 8, 2011
20	"Horror w bibliotece"	"Horror in the Library"	January 15, 2011
21	"Projekt na fizykę"	"Physics Project"	January 16, 2011
22	"Plotki"	"Rumors"	January 29, 2011
23	"Pan Tadeusz"	"Sir Thaddeus"	February 8, 2011
24	"Rewolucja"	"Revolution"	February 12, 2011
25	"Walentynki"	"Valentine's Day"	February 14, 2011
26	"Dokument"	"Document"	February 22, 2011
27	"Czwórka"	"The Grade B"	March 5, 2011
28	"Księżniczka"	"Princess"	March 8, 2011
29	"Trendy"	"Trends"	March 11, 2011
30	"Model"	"Model"	April 1, 2011
31	"Klasowy prezydent"	"Class President"	April 16, 2011
32	"Wykłady o dziewczynach"	"Lectures About Girls"	April 16, 2011
33	"Grawitacja"	"Gravitation"	April 16, 2011
34	"Przepowiednia"	"Prophecy"	May 7, 2011
35	"Święto Niepodległości"	"Independence Day"	May 14, 2011
36	"Pleśń"	"Mold"	May 21, 2011
37	"Klamka"	"Handle"	May 29, 2011
38	"Dyżurna"	"Standby"	June 24, 2011
39	"Służący"	"Servant"	June 24, 2011
40	"Teledysk"	"Music Video"	June 24, 2011

==== Season 2 (2011–2012) ====
No	Title	English title	Original air date
41	"Łowcy duchów"	"Ghost Hunters"	October 29, 2011

== Background and creation ==
The representative of the Disney Channel Poland, Maciej Bral, said:

The Disney company attaches great importance to the creation of local production, complementary to global actions and deepen the relationship with our audience. We are very excited to present the first Polish local production, short series Do dzwonka, which is also our chance to work with the FremantleMedia Poland. This production gives us a chance to be creative in developing program proposals[...] At the moment, we are looking for Polish talents. We are looking for twelve promising young actors to play the lead roles. This format has achieved a great success around the world. We hope to repeat that success in Poland.

On 24 June 2010, it was confirmed that the Disney Channel Poland would make its first original series. Maciej Bral explained it would be a Polish version of the Disney Channel Italy series Quelli dell'intervallo, that had already had numerous international versions. The most popular have been the British and the American, both entitled As the Bell Rings. The official advertisings began airing on the Disney Channel Poland on 18 September 2010.

== See also ==
As the Bell Rings
