= Life (2023 film) =

- Promotional poster
- Directed by: Zeki Demirkubuz
- Written by: Zeki Demirkubuz
- Produced by: Zeki Demirkubuz; Rossitsa Valkanova
- Starring: Miray Daner; Burak Dakak
- Cinematography: Cevahir Şahin; Kürşat Üresin
- Release dates: October 20, 2023 (Filmekimi); December 15, 2023 (Turkey)
- Running time: 193 min.
- Countries: Turkey; Bulgaria
- Language: Turkish

Life (Turkish: Hayat) is a 2023 Turkish drama film directed by Zeki Demirkubuz. It was selected as the Turkish entry for the Best International Feature Film at the 97th Academy Awards, but was not nominated.

== Cast ==
- Miray Daner as Hicran
- Burak Dakak as Rıza
- Umut Kurt as Mehmet
- Melis Birkan as Hicran's mother
- Cem Davran as Orhan
- Doğu Demirkol as Yılmaz
- Osman Alkaş as Rıza's grandfather
- Ozan Dağara as Rıza's uncle
- Kayhan Açıkgöz as Yaşar

== See also ==
- List of submissions to the 97th Academy Awards for Best International Feature Film
- List of Turkish submissions for the Academy Award for Best International Feature Film
