= Punta Escarlata =

- Genre: Mystery
- Starring: Carles Francino; Antonio Hortelano; Nadia de Santiago; Kira Miró; Elena Ballesteros
- Country of origin: Spain
- Original language: Spanish
- No. of seasons: 1
- No. of episodes: 9

Production
- Executive producers: Pablo Barrera; Manuel Valdivia
- Production companies: Cuatro; Globomedia

Original release
- Network: Telecinco
- Release: 20 July – 5 September 2011

Punta Escarlata is a Spanish mystery television series that originally aired on Telecinco from 20 July to 5 September 2011.

== Premise ==
Two girls disappeared after attending an open-air dance in the fictional sea-side village of Punta Escarlata. 8 years later a girl from Madrid experiences a vision about the murder of the girls that leads her to the location of the corpses. Two police officers from Madrid arrive to Punta Escarlata to solve the mystery.

== Cast ==
- Carles Francino as Bosco Ruiz
- Antonio Hortelano as Max Vila
- Nadia de Santiago as Lucía
- Elena Ballesteros as Eva
- Kira Miró as Carla
- Fernando Cayo as Reyes
- Álvaro Cervantes as Marcos
- Macarena García as Raquel
- Javier Coll as Doctor Rozas
- José Sánchez Orosa as the priest
- Chema Ruiz as Lucía's father
- Juan Díaz as Rudy
- Daniel Holguín as Jero
- Carla Díaz as Patricia Rozas
- Ana Rujas as Vir
- Víctor Elías as Ximo
- Andrea Guasch as Itzíar
- Carlotta Cosials as Anabel

== Production and release ==
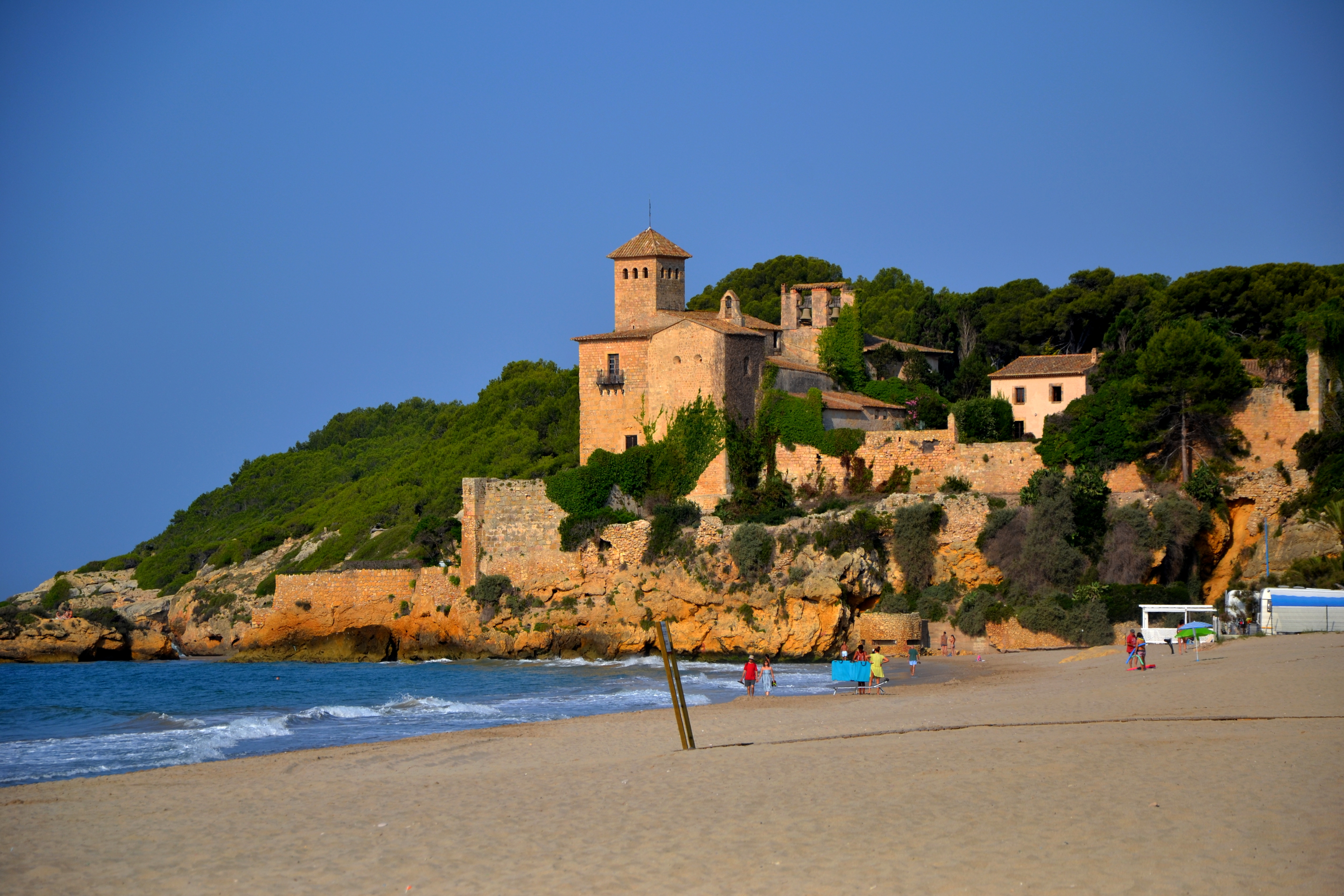
The coast of the province of Tarragona near Altafulla (in the image the Tamarit beach and the Castle of Tamarit) was a shooting location

The executive producers were Pablo Barrera and Manuel Valdivia. The series was produced by Cuatro and Globomedia, and it was intended to air on the former TV channel. The series was filmed in 2009 in Altafulla, province of Tarragona. However, after the merging of the Cuatro and Telecinco's operators, the series was shelved for a while. The first episode eventually aired on Telecinco on 20 July 2011, at 23:26, attracting an audience of 2,054,000 viewers (18.6%), becoming the best fiction release on the channel since Sin tetas no hay paraíso in 2008. The broadcasting run ended on 7 September 2009, averaging a 12.8% share, slightly below the channel's average.

It premiered in the US market on 20 September 2012, aired on VME.

Series	Episodes	Originally released			Viewers	Share (%)	Ref.
Series	Episodes	First released	Last released	Network	Viewers	Share (%)	Ref.
1	9	20 July 2011	7 September 2011	Telecinco	1,610,333	12.8	

This is a caption
No. in season	Title	Viewers	Original release date	Share (%)
1	"Soñé que despertaba"	2,056,000	20 July 2011	18.6
2	"El pasado vuelve hoy"	1,719,000	27 July 2011	16.7
3	"El adiós"	1,650,000	3 August 2011	12.6
4	"El bosque"	1,470,000	10 August 2011	12.4
5	"La sombra"	915,000	17 August 2011	6.1
6	"Los bailes de Marte"	1,305,000	24 August 2011	10.7
7	"El monstruo que habita en los hombres"	1,628,000	31 August 2011	12.8
8	"La duda"	1,810,000	6 September 2011	10.9
9	"La maldición del fin del mundo"	1,940,000	7 September 2011	14.2
