= Shawn Gerrard =

Canadian director

Shawn Gerrard is a Canadian film and television director from Toronto, Ontario. He is most noted for Inheritance, a short documentary film he made as part of the NBA Films for Fans anthology project in 2021.

An alumnus of the film studies program at York University, Gerrard started his career as a post-production producer on television shows such as Odd Squad and Age of Samurai: Battle for Japan. He directed a number of short films before releasing his debut feature film, Space & Time, in 2017.

His television credits have included the series The Next Step, Lockdown and Take Note.

His second feature film, Summer League, is in development.
