= Nadia de Santiago =

Spanish actress

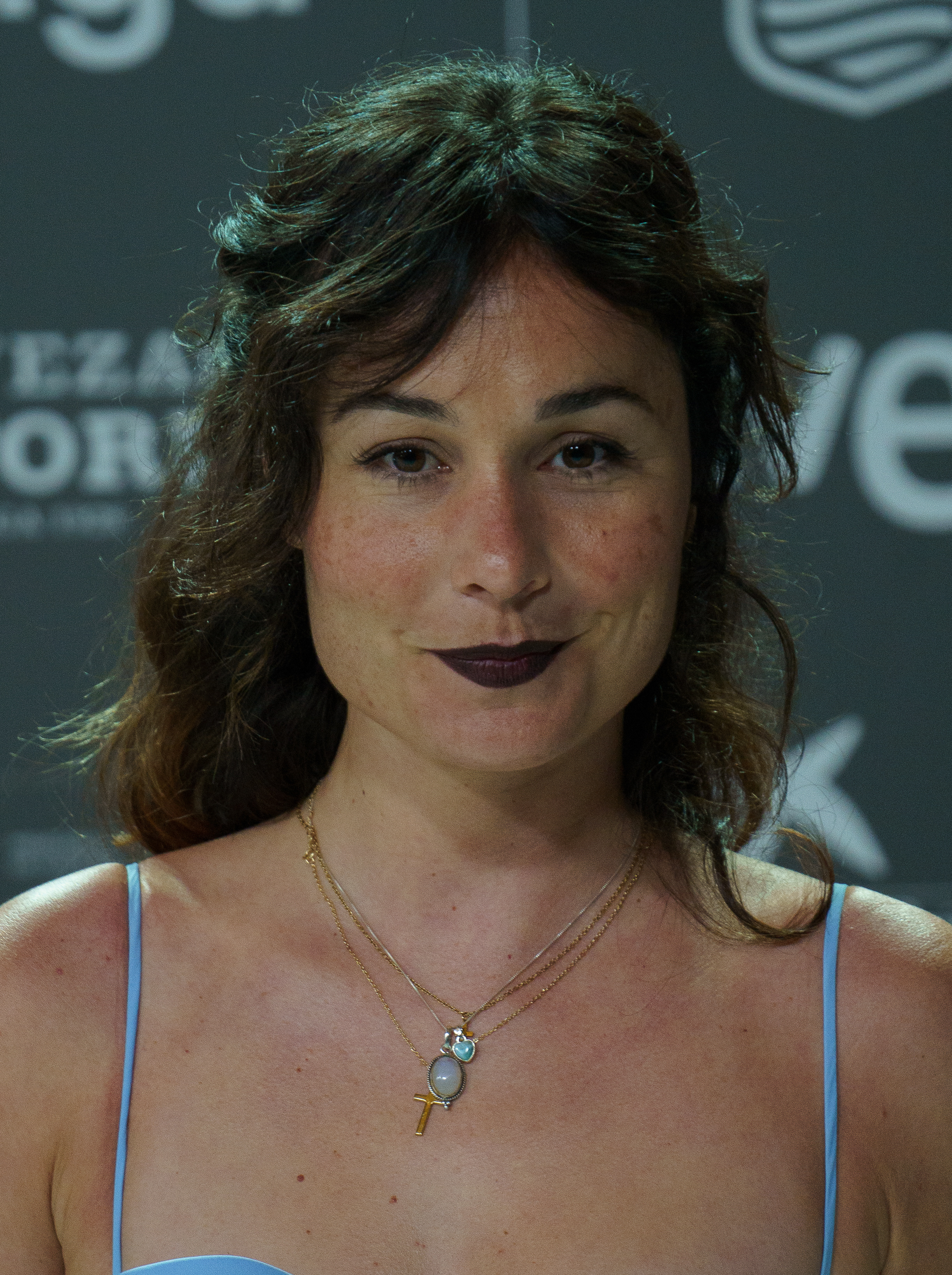
- De Santiago in 2025
- Born: Nadia de Santiago Capell; 3 January 1990 (age 36); Madrid, Spain
- Occupation: Actress
- Years active: 2001-present

Nadia de Santiago Capell (born 3 January 1990) is a Spanish actress.

== Life and career ==
Nadia de Santiago Capell was born in Madrid on 3 January 1990. She made her feature film debut as a child actress in Clara y Elena (2000). In 2007, she was nominated for the Goya Award for Best New Actress for her performance in 13 Roses.

== Selected filmography ==
=== Films ===
Year	Title	Role	Notes	Ref.
2005	Otros días vendrán (Other Days Will Come)	Vega		
2005	Vida y color (Life and Colour)	Sara		
2007	The Dark Hour			
2007	Las 13 rosas (13 Roses)	Carmen		
2014	Musarañas (Shrew's Nest)	La niña		
2019	El increíble finde menguante (The Incredible Shrinking Wknd)	Sira		
2025	Un año y un día (One Year and One Day)	Sara		

=== TV series ===
Year	Title	Role	Notes	Ref.
2003–2004	Ana y los 7	Andrea Hidalgo		
2006–2007	Cambio de Clase	Mafalda		
2009	90-60-90, diario secreto de una adolescente	Luz		
2011	Punta Escarlata	Lucía Castro		
2005-2014	Amar en tiempos revueltos	Asunción Muñoz		
2017-2020	Las chicas del cable	Marga Suárez	42 episodes	
2021	El tiempo que te doy (The Time It Takes)	Lina Ruiz	Also creator	
2025	Manual para señoritas	Elena Bianda		

=== TV films ===
Year	Title	Role
2013	Les enfants volés,	Conchita
