= As the Bell Rings (American TV series) =

American short television program

- Created by: Chris Thompson
- Starring: Demi Lovato; Tony Oller; Carlson Young; Gabriella Rodriguez; Collin Cole; Seth Ginsberg; Lindsey Black
- Country of origin: United States
- Original language: English
- No. of seasons: 2
- No. of episodes: 36 (list of episodes)

Production
- Camera setup: Multi-camera
- Running time: 2–5 minutes

Original release
- Network: Disney Channel
- Release: August 26, 2007 – April 19, 2009

As the Bell Rings is a Disney Channel short show based on the Disney Channel Italy series Quelli dell'intervallo. The format was a selection of short live-action comedy sequences. The American version of As the Bell Rings also aired on the Dutch Disney Channel, as well as the Latin American one. The show ended after the second season.

The series features Demi Lovato (only in season one), Tony Oller, Seth Ginsberg, Carlson Young, Gabriela Rodriguez, Collin Cole and Lindsey Black (only in season two). The first season with 15 episodes began airing on August 26, 2007 at 8:25 and 8:55 p.m. (ET/PT).

== Series overview ==
| Season | Episodes | Originally released | |
| Season | Episodes | First released | Last released |
|---|---|---|---|
| 1 | 15 | August 26, 2007 | April 19, 2008 |
| 2 | 21 | July 5, 2008 | April 19, 2009 |

== Cast ==
- Demi Lovato as Charlotte Adams (season 1) – Charlotte was the main female character in the first season. In Ladder Dudes, Danny asks Charlotte out and she happily agrees. Their feelings for each other are constantly shown, although they will never admit it to each other. Charlotte moves away at the end of season one, due to Lovato filming Camp Rock and starring in the original Disney Channel series, Sonny with a Chance.
- Tony Oller as Daniel "Danny" Neilson – Danny is one of the main characters. He and Charlotte have a very shy, romantic relationship, as he is often crushing on Charlotte and getting her help. He is the most normal out of the three boys and is best friends with Skipper and Toejam. His talents include singing and songwriting. In Season 2, though dismayed that Charlotte moved, he meets the new girl, Lexi, whom he realizes that he knows from his childhood. Since Charlotte moved away his friends have told him to "move on". It is revealed in one episode that Danny's had a crush on Lexi since they were in second grade (when they were around seven or eight).
- Seth Ginsberg as Thomas "Toejam" James – "Toejam" is the other of Danny's best friends. In "I Am Toejam", reveals that "Toejam's" first name is Thomas. There is a lot of romance between Toejam and Brooke, but usually only after Tiffany intervenes, because they're both quite shy. In one episode, though, Toejam steps in on his own when Brooke is being made fun of by the school bully. Also, in another episode, Toejam and Brooke have a "study date" planned and is shy to admit it is a date. When she changes her image and tries to cancel the date, Toejam attempts change his image to fit in with Brooke's new image, proving that he likes her, but the plan backfires when Brooke goes back to her old self.
- Collin Cole as Skipper Adamson – Skipper Adamson is one of Danny Neilson's weird best friends. He is also best friends with Toejam. He likes to call himself the "Funny Kid With The Curly Hair", as seen in his rap. He has a huge crush on the most popular girl in school, Tiffany Blake, and when he gets nervous he starts saying "Uh Uh Uh" until he gets a chance to run away. In one episode he pretends to be his fake uncle, Uncle Kipper, who is a janitor. At the end it turns out that Uncle Kipper is real and that he is a janitor. In another episode Skipper starts to like Lexi and when Toejam told Tiffany she chained herself to Skippers locker while Skipper chains himself to Lexi's locker. But in an ironic twist they are both told by Toejam "You do realize that's not her/his locker?", while they are chained two lockers away from each other. Then Toejam says "I'll get the jaws of life".
- Gabriela Rodriguez as Brooke Nichols – Brooke is the smartest main character out of the seven that have appeared on the show. In the first episode of season 2, it is portrayed that Lexi is just as smart as her. She often disagrees with Tiffany as Tiffany is possibly the most flaky girl in school. Her talent is dancing and being funny. She is best friends with Charlotte, Tiffany and later with Lexi. She also has a crush on Toejam. She is usually called a nerd and a geek by the school bully, until Toejam sticks up for her, proving that he likes her and wants what's best for her. Unfortunately, Brooke and Toejam will not confess their feelings to one another
- Carlson Young as Tiffany Blake – Tiffany is known as the stereotypical "dumb blonde" and the most popular girl in school. She grew up with Brooke and Charlotte and they're very good friends. Sometimes she comes up with good ideas without knowing it. Tiffany's secret admirer is Skipper.
- Lindsey Black as Alexandra "Lexi" Adams (season 2) – Lexi was the main female character in the second season. Lexi replaces Charlotte as Danny's love interest who is very competitive with Danny and beats him in most things, even arm wrestling. Lexi is able to do many magic tricks, and fits well with all of Danny's best guy friends and girl friends. Danny considers her, "one of the guys." Toejam, Brooke, Skipper, and Tiffany all tell Danny to move on since Charlotte moved away, so Danny pays attention to Lexi who has moved back. Lexi is also always trying to tell Danny that she likes him by giving him hints such as pretending to be his girlfriend, writing a poem about him, and saying that they make a great team. Danny doesn't get the hints and always calls her "buddy". However, he has mentioned having a crush on her since the 2nd grade.

== Music ==
"Shadow", by Demi Lovato and Tony Oller was performed in Season 1. "Could You Be the One", "Here I Go" and "All You Gotta Do", by Tony Oller, was performed in Season 2.

== Critical reception ==
Abby West of Entertainment Weekly was mostly unenthusiastic about As the Bell Rings, giving it a grade of "B−" and writing, "It's no Saved by the Bell" and described the shorts as "harmless, if often barely humorous".

== See also ==
- Kurze Pause
- Cambio de Clase
- Trop la Classe!
