= As the Bell Rings (Singaporean TV series) =

2007 Singaporean TV series

- Country of origin: Singapore

Production
- Running time: Approx 5–7 minutes

Original release
- Network: Disney Channel Asia
- Release: February 10 – August 12, 2007

As the Bell Rings is the Singapore version of As the Bell Rings. It is currently on the Disney Channel Xtra Mobile. It is a Singapore adaptation of the Disney Channel Italy Original Series Quelli dell'intervallo.

== Cast ==
- Zac: Dylan Loh
- Elizabeth: Nicole Joy Tan
- Jamie: Chia Zhong Han
- Jackie Chen: Duane Russell Ho An
- Tan Ying Ying: Victoria Lim
- Wee Chong: Wong Renjie
- Aziz Maidin: Farez Bin Juraimi
- Maisy: Deborah Arunditha Emmanuel
