= Zil Çalınca =

Turkish television series

- Starring: Turhan Cihan Şimşek; Elif Ceren Balıkçı; Merve Hazer; Miray Daner; Emir Çalıkkocaoğlu; Aylin Üskaya; Lorin Merhart; Berkay Mercan; Yağmur Yılmaz; Fırat Can Aydın
- Country of origin: Turkey
- Original language: Turkish
- No. of seasons: 2
- No. of episodes: 40

Production
- Executive producer: Timur Savcı
- Running time: 5 minutes (season 1); 7–8 minutes (season 2)
- Production company: Tims Productions

Original release
- Network: Disney Channel Turkey
- Release: April 23, 2012 – June 22, 2013

Zil Çalınca is the first Turkish series of Disney Channel and the last version of As The Bell Rings.

== Characters ==
- Metehan (Turhan Cihan Şimşek): Handsome. Girls love Metehan. He can play guitar. He likes rock music.
- Merve (Elif Ceren Balıkçı): Metehan's sister. She is energetic and talkative. She is friends with Acar.
- Ada (Merve Hazer): Hardworking. She is President of the school. She loves Korcan.
- Duygu (Miray Daner): The most beautiful girl. Daughter of a wealthy family, she wants to be an actress.
- Korcan (Emir Çalıkkocaoğlu): Successful student. Korcan's mother and father are university teachers. He loves his mom and dad very much. He helps his friends with homework. He loves Duygu.
- Aslı (Aylin Üskaya): Athletic. She loves soccer. She has short black hair.
- Acar (Lorin Merhart): Genius. His friends call him "glasses" because he can not see without them.
- Tanıl (Berkay Mercan): Loves physics and chemistry. He is the New Einstein.
- Nisan (Yağmur Yılmaz): Loves nature. Her favorite topics are the melting of glaciers, extinction of animals, organic food, the difference between vegetarians and vegans.
- Sarp (Fırat Can Aydın): Playful student who wears funny hats, colorful scarves, and strange-looking sports shoes. He likes Nisan.

== Episodes ==
=== Series overview ===
Season	Episodes	Originally aired (Turkey)	
Season	Episodes	Season premiere	Season finale
1	19	April 23, 2012	July 27, 2012
Zil Çalınca Avı: TV Movie	1	August 24, 2012	
2	21	October 24, 2012	22 June 2013
