= As the Bell Rings (Japanese TV series) =

2010 Japanese TV series

- Also known as: The Break Time
- Country of origin: Japan
- Original language: Japanese
- No. of seasons: 2
- No. of episodes: 39

Production
- Running time: 10 minutes

Original release
- Network: Disney Channel
- Release: February 2, 2010 – July 5, 2011

The Yasumi Jikan (Japanese: ザ・休み時間; The Break Time) is the Japanese version of As the Bell Rings. It is a Japanese adaptation of the Disney Channel Italy Original Series Quelli dell' Intervallo.

== Characters ==
- Rica (Yuko Takayam)
- Yūta (Kosei Mizuta)
- Karen (Ai Hasegawa)
- Kazuyo (Marika Fukunaga)
- Akira (Aoi Nakamura)
- Jirō (Sota Maeda)
