= List of As the Bell Rings (American TV series) episodes =

This is a list of episodes of the Disney Channel American sitcom, As the Bell Rings.

== Series overview ==
Season	Episodes	Originally released	
Season	Episodes	First released	Last released
1	15	August 26, 2007	April 19, 2008
2	21	July 5, 2008	April 19, 2009

== Episodes ==
=== Season 1 (2007–08) ===
- Note: The first five episodes are five minutes long. Episodes 6–15 are two minutes long.

No. overall	No. in season	Title	Original release date	Prod. code
1	1	"Flower Day"	August 26, 2007	101
Danny and Charlotte secretly want to give each other flowers on "Flower Day" at school.
2	2	"Talent Show"	August 26, 2007	102
The gang prepares auditions for the school talent show while Danny and Charlotte compose a song and sing a duet.
3	3	"The Dance"	August 31, 2007	103
Danny tries to get Charlotte to go to the dance with him, but ends up getting stuck with going to the dance with an extremely tall girl named Cherylle instead.
4	4	"To Go or Not Go"	September 7, 2007	104
The boys are curious as to why girls always go to the bathroom together.
5	5	"Bad Boys"	September 14, 2007	105
When they see Charlotte with Frank at lunch, Skipper tells Danny that Charlotte likes so-called bad boys so he, Skipper and Toejam dress up like bad boys. And when Charlotte sees Danny talking to the bad girl in school, Brooke tells her that boys like bad girls. Then Charlotte, Tiffany and Brooke dress up like bad girls and then they both realize that Charlotte was only tutoring Frank and that neither of them like bad boys/girls.
6	6	"Ladder Dudes"	September 21, 2007	106
Skipper and Toejam help Danny ask Charlotte out by hanging on to ladders outside of the school while telling Danny what to say. Absent: Carlson Young (Tiffany) and Gabriela Rodriguez (Brooke)
7	7	"Slacker Girl"	October 5, 2007	107
Brooke decides to not care about work after she receives her first B on a test. Toejam decides to change his appearance to a matching "goth look" since they had a "study date" planned, only to find out Brooke changes back to her original look after finding out the B was a mistake and had actually gotten an A. Absent: Carlson Young (Tiffany), Tony Oller (Danny) and Collin Cole (Skipper)
8	8	"The Mascot"	October 19, 2007	108
Skipper becomes the school mascot, an Eagle, and tries to surprise and impress Tiffany. But then Skipper finds Tiffany has a fear of birds. Absent: Demi Lovato (Charlotte)
9	9	"The Quiz"	November 10, 2007	109
Toejam finds Charlotte's magazine, where Danny and him see a quiz. Danny and Toejam think Charlotte filled it out, but her mother did. Danny is embarrassed to clog dance to impress Charlotte. Absent: Collin Cole (Skipper)
10	10	"Ladies Man"	November 30, 2007	110
Skipper reads a book about how to talk to girls and tries to talk to Tiffany. But he got nervous, couldn't talk, and ran away. Absent: Demi Lovato (Charlotte) and Gabriela Rodriguez (Brooke)
11	11	"Tiffany's Web"	December 21, 2007	111
Tiffany decides to be a fashion designer. Toejam suggests she use Danny as her male model for her new (and very bad) design to get back at Danny for calling him "Small Fry". Toejam gets more payback by photographing Danny in the ugly costume. Absent: Demi Lovato (Charlotte), Gabriela Rodriguez (Brooke) and Collin Cole (Skipper)
12	12	"Presidential"	February 22, 2008	112
Brooke runs for class president, and her success is determined by the vote of the boys. So each of the girls got caught up in the campaign election. They feel it is tacky to give away free stuff, but they decide to bake cupcakes. Tiffany is put in charge of hanging up the fliers and baking cupcakes but instead puts the flyers in the cupcakes making them a success. Absent: Collin Cole (Skipper)
13	13	"The Kiss"	March 14, 2008	113
Skipper helps Danny practice kissing with Charlotte to audition for Romeo in the Romeo and Juliet play happening at the school since Danny finds out Charlotte is auditioning for Juliet. Absent: Carlson Young (Tiffany), Gabriela Rodriguez (Brooke) and Seth Ginsburg (Toejam)
14	14	"The Geek Squad"	March 21, 2008	114
Since Frank won't stop calling Brooke a geek, the gang, the entire school and even Tiffany, all transform into geeks to make Frank apologize to Brooke and never do it again. Absent: Collin Cole (Skipper)
15	15	"Hall Monitor"	April 19, 2008	115
Skipper becomes hall monitor and Danny and Toejam think that Skipper will be their free get-out-of-jail pass, but Skipper disagrees.

=== Season 2 (2008–09) ===
No. overall	No. in season	Title	Original release date	Prod. code
16	1	"The (Not So) New Girl"	July 5, 2008	201
In the season premiere, although Danny is sad Charlotte has moved, his spirits are lifted when the gang introduces him to Lexi Adams and he realizes he's met her before in the second grade.
17	2	"Chess for a Day"	July 12, 2008	202
Lexi and Danny face off in a series of competitions to see who's the better competitor.
18	3	"Fake Girlfriend"	July 19, 2008	203
Danny asks Lexi to be his fake girlfriend so he can get a date with Jenny.
19	4	"Ballad from Lexi"	August 2, 2008	204
Danny puts a poem into music written by Lexi without knowing it was made towards her feelings to him.
20	5	"Muscles"	August 9, 2008	205
Skipper has trouble opening a jar in front of Tiffany. So Toejam coaches Skipper in working out to try to impress her. Absent: Lindsey Black (Lexi)
21	6	"Undercover Brother"	August 16, 2008	206
The girls dress like men to find out if the guys like them.
22	7	"Daydreamer"	August 30, 2008	207
Danny talks in his sleep, while Lexi listens to what he says. When he finally wakes up from the multiple dreams, Danny asks Lexi if she heard him say anything and she replies no; but when he leaves she whispers to herself smiling "liked me since the 2nd grade huh?". Absent: Carlson Young (Tiffany) and Seth Ginsberg (Toejam)
23	8	"Romeo & Juliet"	September 6, 2008	208
Toejam asks Tiffany for help on the Romeo and Juliet (played by Tony Oller and Lindsey Black respectively) test that they have to take. Absent: Lindsey Black (Lexi), Tony Oller (Danny) and Gabriela Rodriguez (Brooke)
24	9	"Here I Go"	September 12, 2008	209
Danny attempts to make a music video, but he foolishly picks Skipper to be the director.
25	10	"I Am Toejam"	October 5, 2008	210
Lexi wonders where Toejam got his nickname, Brooke says he is a big rapper in Tokyo, Danny says he opened his jammed locker (he said his toe was shaped like a crowbar), and Skipper said he ate a whole jar of jam with his toe (shaped like a spoon), but, it ends up that Toejam is Thomas and James together, which is his first and middle name. Absent: Carlson Young (Tiffany)
26	11	"All You Gotta Do"	October 19, 2008	211
Danny cheers everyone up on a rainy day with a song.
27	12	"Class Photo"	November 2, 2008	212
It's time to take a class photo, which makes the guys scared. Tiffany gives them tips. Absent: Lindsey Black (Lexi) and Gabriela Rodriguez (Brooke)
28	13	"Butler for a Week"	November 16, 2008	213
Skipper becomes Lexi's butler for a week after losing to her in a video game. Absent: Tony Oller (Danny) and Seth Ginsberg (Toejam)
29	14	"Unreal World"	December 7, 2008	214
After receiving several different ideas, Brooke decides to do a serious documentary for her film class. Unfortunately, her friends seem to have trouble acting normally in front of the camera. In the end, Brooke ends up getting an 'A' for turning in the project as it is.
30	15	"Study Partners"	December 21, 2008	215
Danny and Brooke are lab partners but Danny decides not to help. But when Brooke goes out sick, Danny is doomed. Absent: Carlson Young (Tiffany), Collin Cole (Skipper) and Seth Ginsberg (Toejam)
31	16	"Dance Contest"	January 4, 2009	216
Brooke needs a dance partner for a dance competition but Skipper, Danny and Toejam think it's lame, but when they hear there is money involved, they try to prove to Brooke that they can dance.
32	17	"Freaky Thursday"	February 8, 2009	217
Brooke and Tiffany think about what life would be like if they traded places. Absent: Lindsey Black (Lexi) and Tony Oller (Danny)
33	18	"Skipper's Away"	February 16, 2009	218
When Tiffany doesn't recognize Skipper chained on her locker, Skipper temporarily likes Lexi when she says he is funny. So Tiffany tries to get Skipper back. Absent: Tony Oller (Danny) and Gabriela Rodriguez (Brooke)
34	19	"Mona Lexi"	February 22, 2009	219
The gang prepares for the annual art contest. Lexi doesn't know what to do so the gang gives her advice that finally shows her artistic side.
35	20	"Rockstar Dreams"	March 22, 2009	220
The gang tries to think about what life would be like if Danny were a rock star. Absent: Lindsey Black (Lexi), Carlson Young (Tiffany) and Seth Ginsberg (Toejam)
36	21	"If I Had a Million"	April 5, 2009	221
Brooke, Toejam, and Skipper imagine if what they would do with a million dollars. Absent: Lindsey Black (Lexi), Tony Oller (Danny) and Carlson Young as (Tiffany)
37	22	"Dress to Impress"	April 19, 2009	222
Skipper wonders what to wear of something to impress Danny and Toejam and Skipper wears the trendy clothes. Lexi, Brooke and Tiffany take Skipper for a high school lunch.
