= Take Note =

2022 multinational TV series or program

- Genre: Musical comedy
- Created by: Joan Lambur
- Developed by: Micheal Feldman; Earl Davis
- Starring: Braelyn Rankins; Nadine Whiteman Roden; Aadin Church; Sebastian Spencer
- Countries of origin: Canada; United States
- Original language: English
- No. of seasons: 1
- No. of episodes: 10

Production
- Executive producer: Joan Lambur
- Producers: Micheal Feldman; Earl Davis
- Camera setup: Single-camera
- Running time: 23 minutes
- Production companies: Lambur Productions; WildBrain Studios

Original release
- Network: Peacock; Family Channel
- Release: February 24, 2022

Take Note is a musical comedy television series created by Joan Lambur and developed by Micheal Feldman and Earl Davis that premiered on February 24, 2022, on Peacock and on February 28, 2022, on Family Channel. In June 2021, the series was green-lit for 10 episodes.

== Episodes ==
No. overall	No. in season	Title	Directed by	Written by	Original release date	Prod. code
1	1	"Courage"	Warren P. Sonoda	George Doty IV	February 24, 2022	101
Calvin must overcome his performance anxiety to win a spot on his favorite reality singing competition show, Take Note.
2	2	"Beginnings"	Warren P. Sonoda	George Doty IV	February 24, 2022	102
The Richards family must find their bearings in the strange new world of Hollywood and Take Note.
3	3	"Trust"	James Dunnison	Earl Davis & Michael Feldman	February 24, 2022	103
When another contestant tells Calvin that Sydney and Miles are deceitful, he must overcome his suspicions and learn to trust his new Take Note friends as well as his own instincts about how to compete.
4	4	"Community"	James Dunnison	Earl Davis & Michael Feldman	February 24, 2022	104
As the competition heats up, emotions start to boil over. Miles is on edge; Noah's losing patience with Calvin, and Calvin thinks Sydney has quit the show because of something he said.
5	5	"Respect"	Joyce Wong	Tally Knoll	February 24, 2022	105
Calvin is paired with Noah for a duets challenge and discovers there's a whole lot more to his rival than meets the eye.
6	6	"Growth"	Joyce Wong	Ian Steaman	February 24, 2022	106
It's "Folk Music Week" and Calvin struggles to find a connection with music written years before he was born.
7	7	"Loss"	Alicia K. Harris	Jennifer Siddle	February 24, 2022	107
After his big win the previous week, Calvin suffers a surprising and painful loss that rocks his soul.
8	8	"Sacrifice"	Shawn Gerrard	Amanda Joy	February 24, 2022	108
Reggie's uncharacteristic focus on Calvin winning causes a rift between him and Drea.
9	9	"Acceptance"	James Dunnison	Tally Knoll & Jennifer Siddle	February 24, 2022	109
Calvin must come to terms with having been eliminated from the competition.
10	10	"Strength"	Warren P. Sonoda	Amanda Joy & Ian Steaman	February 24, 2022	110
After being dramatically saved by Ivy, Calvin must overcome his anxiety and fear to win Take Note.
