= Deborah Emmanuel =

Slam poet and multi-disciplinary artist

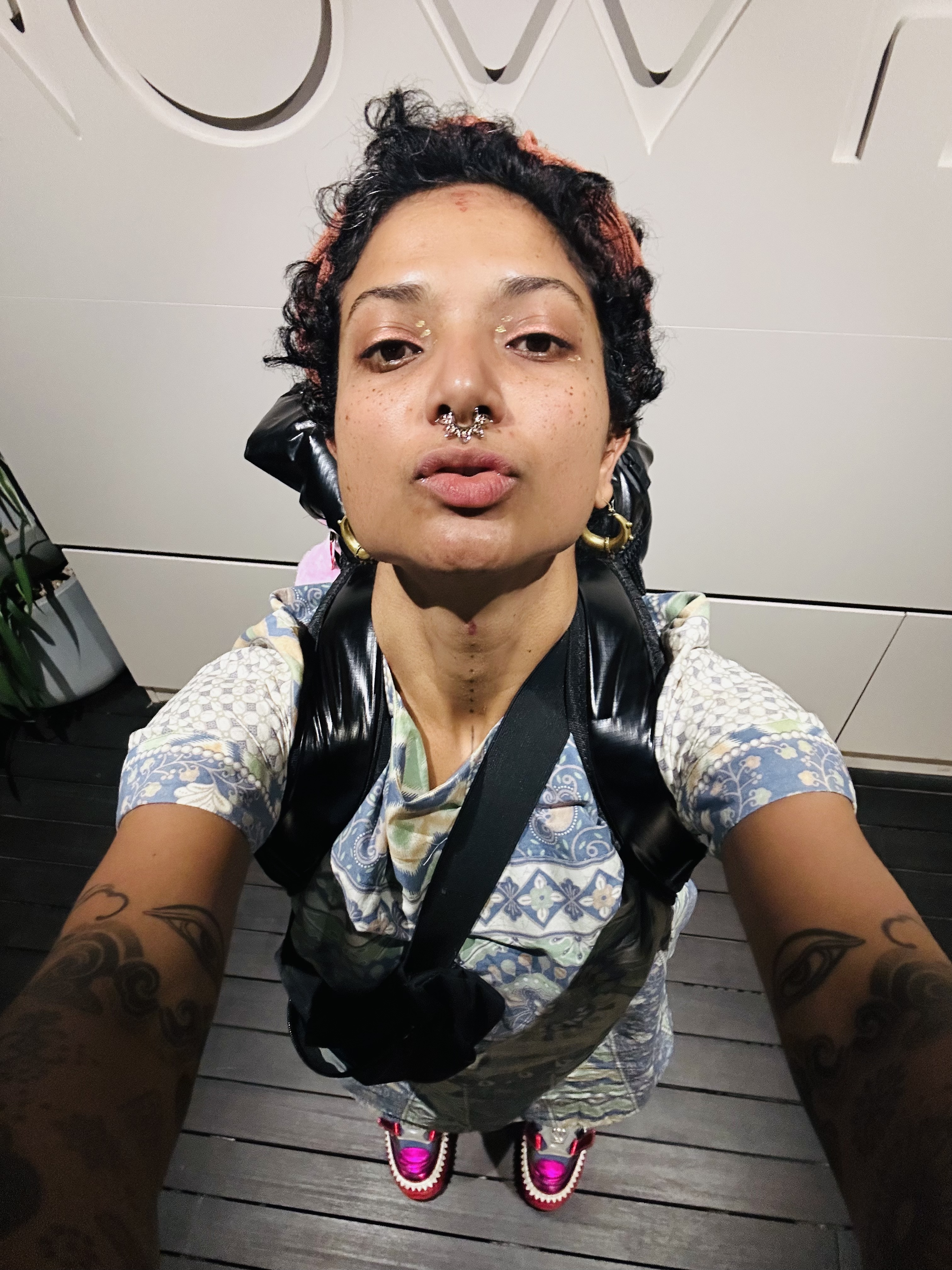
- Born: Deborah Arunditha Emmanuel; 19 September 1988 (age 38)
- Other name: ArunDitha
- Occupations: Slam poet and multi-disciplinary artist
- Notable work: When I Giggle In My Sleep, Genesis Visual Poetry Collection, Rebel Rites

Deborah Emmanuel (19 September 1988), known by her performance name ArunDitha, is a slam poet and multi-disciplinary artist from Singapore.

As a slam poet, she has won competitions in Singapore, Germany and Australia. She has performed at Singapore Repertory Theatre’s A Midsummer Night’s Dream, and acted in Okto’s kids show Zoom Zim Zam, and Disney’s comedy series, As the Bell Rings. She also makes music with musicians and bands including Wobology, Mantravine, The Ditha Project and Kiat.

== Education ==
Emmanuel holds a diploma in applied drama and psychology from Singapore Polytechnic and graduated with a Bachelor of Arts in contemporary and applied theatre from Australia’s Griffith University.

== Literary career ==
Emmanuel wrote her first poem at the age of 11, dedicated to her mother as a birthday gift. While at Singapore Polytechnic, she attended a workshop with Chris Mooney-Singh and Savinder Kaur who ran Word Forward, and wrote a poem about prison.

She has toured the world performing at National Arts Council Writers Fest 2015 in Singapore, World Travel’s Story Fest 2018 in Australia, Barcelona International Poetry Festival in 2018, Concave Summit 2019 in London and Superpowerpoetry 2020 in Berlin. In September 2016 she toured 4 cities in Nepal with performance poet Sarah Kay. She has published two books of poetry, When I Giggle In My Sleep (2015) and Genesis Visual Poetry Collection (2018), as well as the volume of prose Rebel Rites (2016). Her poetry and prose has been published by The Straits Times, Math Paper Press, Ethos Books and Penguin Random House.

Emmanuel also performed Singapore Writers Festival’s commissioned song Ocean Free at the opening of the festival in November 2017 and performed Apostrophe at The Performance Theater in the same year.

In 2019, Emmanuel hosted the documentary series Show Me The City on Channel News Asia. An art installation, called Modern Resonance II, was depicted by her, visual artist Alecia Neo, sound artist Li-Chuan Chong at the BuySingLit movement, an annual industry-led movement to promote Singapore literature. Emmanuel is a regular TEDx speaker in Singapore.

== Personal life ==
Emmanuel was imprisoned for a year for drug consumption. Her mother died in 2013 of ovarian cancer.
