= As the Bell Rings (Russian TV series) =

2010 Russian TV series

- Приколы на переменке
- Country of origin: Russia
- Original language: Russian

Production
- Running time: Approx 5-7 minutes

Original release
- Network: Disney Channel
- Release: August 10, 2010 – May 25, 2012

As the Bell Rings (Russian: Приколы на переменке, romanized: Prikoly na peremenke) was a Russian adaptation of the Disney Channel Italy Original Series Quelli dell'intervallo. It was broadcast on Disney Channel Russia, formerly Jetix Russia, and premiered on August 10, 2010.

== See also ==
- As the Bell Rings, for other adaptations
