= Disney Channel (Russia) =

Former Russian free-to-air TV channel

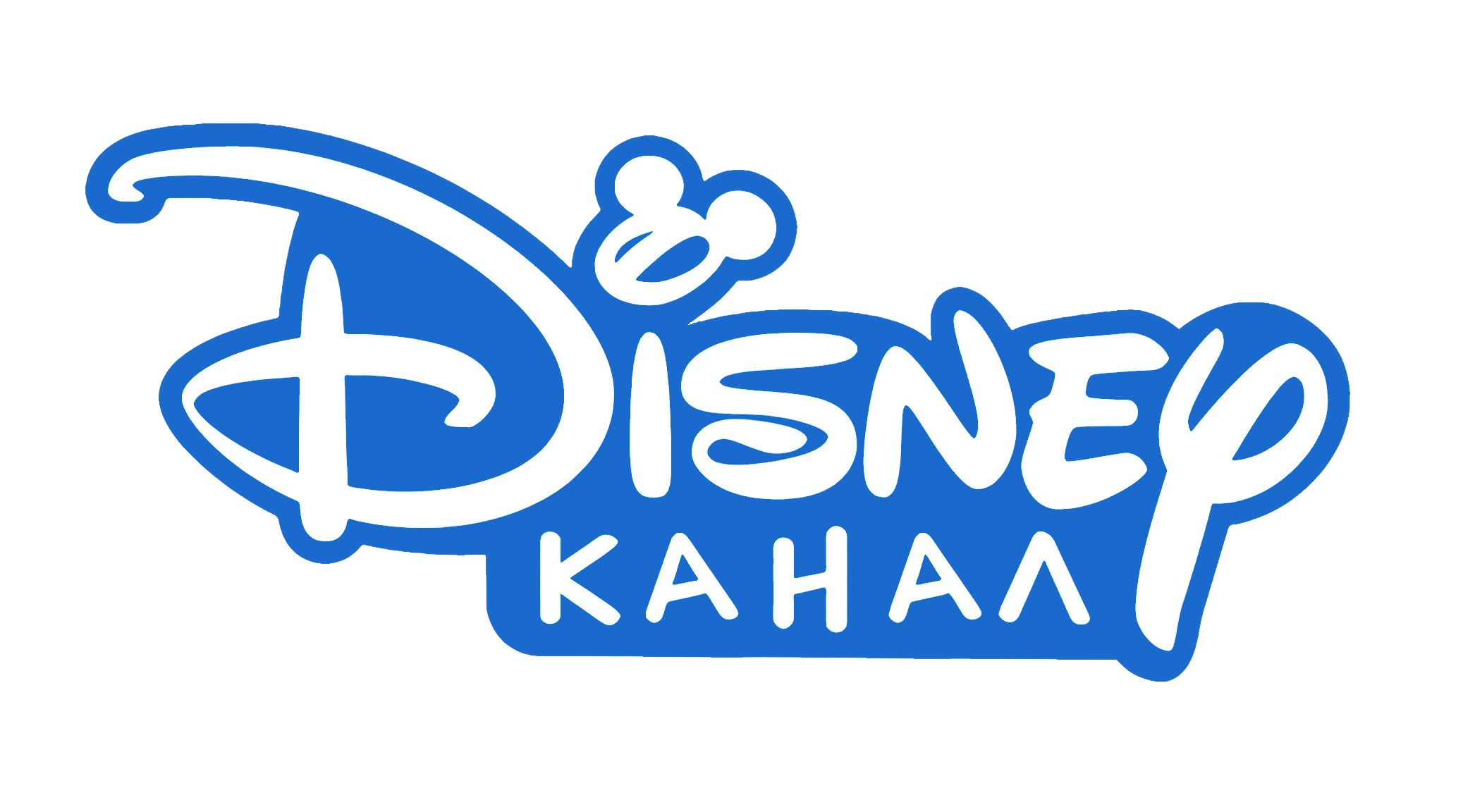
- Final logo used from 1 August 2014 to 14 December 2022
- Country: Russia
- Broadcast area: Russia; Belarus
- Headquarters: Moscow, Russia

Programming
- Languages: Russian; English (2010–2011)
- Picture format: 16:9 576i (SDTV)

Ownership
- Owner: Media1 (80%); The Walt Disney Company CIS (20%) (2016-2022)
- Key people: Vladimir Vereshchagin (Vice President, TV and Film Production); Svetlana Lysko (Editor-in-Chief); Kakhaber Abashidze (CEO The Walt Disney Company CIS); Jan Kuhalsky — (CEO Disney Channel)

History
- Launched: 1 April 1999; 27 years ago 31 December 2011; 14 years ago (free-to-air TV broadcast)
- Replaced: Seven TV (on-air broadcasting)
- Closed: 14 December 2022; 3 years ago
- Replaced by: Solntse
- Former names: Fox Kids (1999–2005); Jetix (2005–2010)

Links
- Website: Disney Channel Russia (archived August 2022)

Disney Channel (Russian: Канал Disney, romanized: Kanal Disney) was a Russian free-to-air television channel, serving as a local version of the American Disney Channel. It was launched as a pay television channel on 10 August 2010. On 31 December 2011, after acquiring the Russian free-to-air television network Semyorka, Disney Channel was launched in its place, becoming the second Disney Channel feed to be broadcast on free-to-air national television, after Spain and before Turkey and Germany. The channel ceased broadcasting on 14 December 2022, due to content licensing issues.

The channel targeted viewers aged 10 to 45 and aired popular animated series, live-action shows, and films, including both Disney originals and Russian-produced content.

== History ==
=== Background (1991–2004) ===
Before the creation of Disney Channel in Russia, Disney content, including animated series, TV shows, and films, was broadcast on several Russian channels through blocks such as "Walt Disney Presents" (1991-1992), "Disney Club" (1998-2014), and "The Magical World of Disney" (2007-2013). These blocks aired on major networks like Channel One, RTR, STS, and REN TV. After Disney Channel launched, these blocks were discontinued.

Despite having its own channel, Disney films and animated features continued to premiere on larger federal channels like Channel One until 2017, with STS becoming Disney’s primary partner for premieres. Since 2016, REN TV has aired Disney-owned action and horror films.

In 1999, Fox Kids, a joint venture between News Corporation and Saban Entertainment, launched in Russia. It primarily aired animated series and films from Saban Entertainment, DIC Entertainment, and Marvel. In 2001, The Walt Disney Company acquired Fox Family Worldwide and a controlling stake in Fox Kids Europe, leading to the eventual rebranding of Fox Kids as Jetix.

=== Jetix (2005–2009) ===
On 1 January 2005, Fox Kids was rebranded as Jetix. The channel continued to air programs from Fox Kids alongside new shows such as W.I.T.C.H., A.T.O.M., and Super Robot Monkey Team Hyperforce Go.

On 1 January 2006, Jetix introduced the "Jetix Max" block, a three-hour segment aimed at older audiences featuring comedies, anime, and classic Marvel shows. The channel's broadcast hours were extended to 2:00 AM, and ESPN Classic Sports was removed from the lineup. Later in April 2006, the "Jetix Play" block was launched, featuring animated series from Saban Entertainment and DIC Entertainment.

A proposal to launch a separate Disney Channel in Russia began in January 2007 but was postponed and faced regulatory challenges. A second attempt in early 2009 was blocked by the Federal Antimonopoly Service.

On 1 July 2008, Jetix switched to 24-hour broadcasting. Disney increased its stake in Jetix Europe to 99.8% by February 2009. On 19 September 2009, Jetix Russia launched, operating exclusively from Moscow, with The Walt Disney Company CIS as the owner and Telco Media providing technical support.

=== Launch of the original incarnation; merger with 7TV and content expansion (2010–2015) ===
On 31 March 2010, Disney received a license from Roskomnadzor for broadcasting Disney Channel in Russia, and the channel officially launched on 10 August 2010, replacing Jetix. Disney Channel began with the animated film Finding Nemo and initially mirrored the Eastern European Disney Channel feed.

On 20 December 2010, Disney Channel started broadcasting with a +2 time shift for Eastern Russia. The channel offered a mix of Disney content, Jetix series, and domestic productions like Disney 365 and As the Bell Rings. The "Uznavaika" block for preschoolers, akin to Playhouse Disney, was featured until 2020.

On 27 October 2011, Disney acquired a 49% stake in Seven TV to launch Disney Channel on federal frequencies, officially starting on 31 December 2011, with Mickey's Twice Upon a Christmas. The channel was managed by LLC 7TV, a joint venture between Disney and UTV Holding. The Disney Channel began airing ABC series, Russian animations, and feature films in various time slots.

From mid-2013, the channel incorporated Russian cartoons and features from studios like Pixar and DreamWorks. It also introduced local children's programming such as Through the Mouth of a Baby and Mom for 5+.

By early 2014, feature films and TV series were reduced, with most programming shifting to nighttime slots. On 1 August 2014, the network underwent a global rebranding and increased the "Big Animation" block to daily. The "Uznavaika" block expanded to 7 hours, and new programs like Everything Interesting: Cinema replaced previous projects.

=== Reorganization and closure (2016–2022) ===
In January 2016, following amendments to Russian media laws limiting foreign ownership to 20%, UTV Holding increased its stake in Disney Channel Russia to 80%, while The Walt Disney Company retained a 20% share. Despite this, Disney's economic involvement remained at 49%, overseeing content, rights management, and production, while UTV handled technical support and distribution.

In 2017, AF Media sold its stake in UTV Holding, and by 2019, all UTV Holding assets, including Disney Channel, were transferred to Media1. Disney and Media1 became the sole founders of LLC 7TV.

The channel underwent a rebranding in late 2018, updating its design and logo placement. In early 2020, game series returned to nighttime slots, with daytime broadcasts resuming briefly in June 2020 before being removed again in August 2021. The "Uznavaika" (Russian: Узнавайка, lit. 'Learn more') block was rebranded to "Dobroe utro s Mickey" (Russian: Доброе утро с Микки, lit. 'Good morning with Mickey') on 1 May 2020, with reduced airtime.

On 11 March 2022, Disney suspended operations in Russia after the country invaded Ukraine. By summer 2022, Disney ceased dubbing content in Russian, and the channel's website and social media were shut down by 30 September 2022. The channel ceased broadcasting on 14 December 2022, with its last program being Gravity Falls episode "The Last Mabelcorn", followed by a short version of Frozen's "Let It Go" by Anna Buturlina. Disney exited LLC 7TV, and Media1 launched a new channel, Solntse, on the former Disney Channel frequencies. Disney ended its association with Media1 entirely.

== Aftermath and replacement ==
Solntse
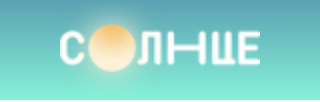
- Country: Russia
- Broadcast area: Russia; Belarus
- Headquarters: Moscow, Russia

Programming
- Language: Russian
- Picture format: 1080i (HDTV); 576i (SDTV)

Ownership
- Owner: Media1

History
- Launched: 14 December 2022; 3 years ago
- Replaced: Disney Channel

Links
- Website: sun-tv.ru/

Solntse (Russian: Солнце, lit. '[The] Sun') is a Russian free-to-air television channel launched on 14 December 2022 as the replacement for Disney Channel following the mutual termination of the joint venture agreement between Disney and Media1 which had operated Disney Channel in the country since 21 August 2010. The channel focuses on family entertainment through animated shows, family-oriented shows, films and all-Russian TV shows.

== Programming ==
Disney Channel Russia primarily targeted younger audiences with its programming. From 2010, the channel featured Playhouse Disney content, which was later rebranded to Disney Junior on 1 May 2020. Initially, the programming block aired from early morning until 12:00 p.m., but its airtime gradually decreased over the years.

Early on, Disney Channel Russia mirrored the Eastern European Disney Channel feed and included former Jetix programming. The lineup featured a mix of Disney Channel and Disney XD live-action series, such as Jessie, Austin & Ally and Lab Rats, alongside animated series from Disney Channel and Jetix like Phineas and Ferb and Kid vs. Kat.

Starting in 2014, the channel shifted focus to children's animation, incorporating Disney XD and Disney Junior series such as Gravity Falls, Star vs. the Forces of Evil and DuckTales. Live-action programming declined due to cultural differences and financial challenges. A new evening block, "Большая Анимация" ("Great Animation"), replaced the earlier "Your Bright Night!" block, showcasing Disney’s theatrical movies nightly at 7:30 p.m. In 2020, live-action series made a brief return, with the premiere of Gabby Duran & the Unsittables.

=== Disney Channel Russia Original Productions ===
- Boljshie semeynye igry ("The Great Family Game", Большие семейные игры)
- Eto moy rebyonok?! ("Is this my child?!", Это мой ребёнок?!)
- Eto moya komnata! ("This is my room!", Это моя комната!)
- Mama na 5+ ("Mama 5+", Мама на 5+)
- Pravila stilya ("Style rules", Правила стиля)
- Posle shkoly ("After School", После школы)
- Prikoly na peremenke: Novaya shkola ("As the Bell Rings: A New School", Приколы на переменке. Новая школа)
- Ustami mladentsa ("The mouth of the baby", Устами младенца)
- Vsyo interesnoe: Kino ("Everything interesting: Movies", Всё интересное: Кино)

== Logos ==
1999–2005

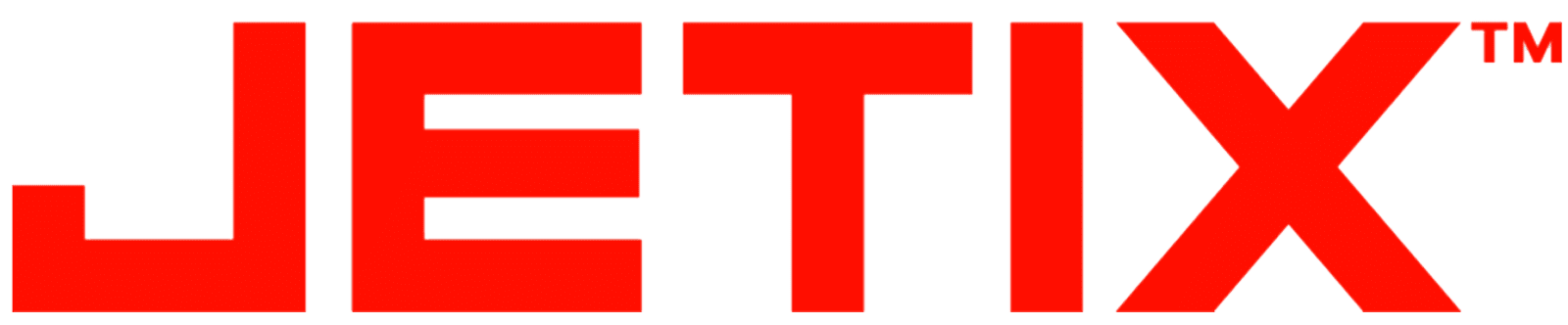
2005–2009

2010–2014

== See also ==
- Jetix
- Jetix Play
- Seven TV
- Disney Channel (Central and Eastern Europe)
