= Cambio de Clase =

- Cambio de Clase title card
- Country of origin: Spain
- No. of seasons: 4
- No. of episodes: 69

Production
- Running time: 5–7 minutes
- Production company: Grundy Producciones Spain

Original release
- Network: Disney Channel Spain
- Release: September 11, 2006 – February 21, 2009

Cambio de Clase is a television program that is the Spanish version of As the Bell Rings. It is shown on the Disney Channel and every Sunday on one cable broadcast. It is a Spanish adaptation of the Disney Channel Italy Original Series Quelli dell'intervallo.

The premiere of the series in Spain took place on September 11, 2006, on the Disney Channel Spain channel and Disney Zone @ TVE. Since then, broadcast daily on Disney Channel and Saturdays and Sundays at TVE.

The series is starring Andrea Guasch, Juan Luppi, Nadia de Santiago, Santiago Luisber, Sergio Garcia and Ismael Garcia, who give life to Valentina, Nico, Bertini, Mafalda, Max and Nacho. In 2007, the characters played by Andrea Guasch and Sergio Martin were absent due to the filming of the Disney Channel Games 2007.

The second season began filming in June 2007 and debuted in late 2007 on Disney Channel Spain.

== Cast ==
- Sergio Martín as Max
- Luisber Santiago as Bertini
- Andrea Guasch as Valentina
- Rafael Ramos as Newton
- Nadia de Santiago as Mafalda
- Maria Torres as Rocky (seasons 1–2)
- Maria Palacios as Laura
- David Becerra as Piñata
- Juan Lippi as Nico (seasons 1–2)
- Sandra Blázquez as Luna
- Eduardo Espinilla as Espi (seasons 1–2)
- Ismael García as Nacho (season 2–present)
