= Disney Channel Games =

Games competition among Disney Channel stars

- Logo between 2007 and 2008
- Genre: Sports
- Created by: Art Spigel
- Developed by: Disney–ABC Domestic Television
- Presented by: Phill Lewis; Brian Stepanek
- Opening theme: "Let's Go!" (2008)
- Country of origin: United States
- Original language: English
- No. of seasons: 3
- No. of episodes: 24

Production
- Executive producers: Danny Kallis; Kevin Lima
- Production locations: Disney's Wide World of Sports Complex; Orlando, Florida
- Camera setup: Multi-camera

Original release
- Network: Disney Channel
- Release: June 10, 2006 – August 30, 2008

Disney Channel Games are a Battle of the Network Stars-based annual television series that aired on the Disney Channel during the summer from 2006 to 2008. Phill Lewis was the co-host of the 2006 and 2007 editions and Brian Stepanek hosted all three of them. The show had various stars from Disney Channel and its international iterations competing for charity as team-based contestants. The Games were filmed at Disney's Wide World of Sports in Orlando.

Disney Channel Games were not aired after 2008, but a similar series called Disney's Friends for Change Games aired in 2011.

== Series overview ==
Season	Episodes	Originally released	
Season	Episodes	First released	Last released
1	9	June 10, 2006	August 19, 2006
2	10	June 15, 2007	August 25, 2007
3	5	July 27, 2008	August 30, 2008

The Disney Channel Games began as a series of shorts that aired during summer 2006. A second edition followed in summer 2007, with the final edition of the series airing in summer 2008.

A Disney spokesperson confirmed in February 2009 that the Disney Channel Games would not be held that year due to actor availability and Disney's "focusing on the launch of a new pro-social initiative with Disney Channel and Disney XD stars". The result was Disney's Friends for Change initiative. The series also did not air in 2010.

== Competitors ==
=== Disney Channel Games 2006 ===
Hosts	The Red Team	The Blue Team	The Green Team
Kim Possible and Dr. Drakken; Jake Long and Fu Dog; Kuzco and Kronk	Zac Efron (captain); Kay Panabaker; Dylan Sprouse; Anneliese van der Pol; Moises Arias; Shin Koyamada	Brenda Song (captain); Vanessa Hudgens; Cole Sprouse; Corbin Bleu; Monique Coleman; Jason Earles	Ashley Tisdale (captain); Lucas Grabeel; Kyle Massey; Miley Cyrus; Emily Osment; Mitchel Musso

=== Disney Channel Games 2007 ===
Hosts	The Red Team	The Blue Team	The Green Team	The Yellow Team
Phill Lewis Brian Stepanek	Brenda Song (captain); Ashley Tisdale; Adrienne Bailon; Mitchel Musso; Jason Earles; Moises Arias; Sydney White; Francois Civil; Sergio Martin	Corbin Bleu (captain); Cole Sprouse; Kiely Williams; Maiara Walsh; Jake T. Austin; Isabella Soric; Giulio Rubinelli; Roger Gonzalez	Dylan Sprouse (captain); Monique Coleman; Lucas Grabeel; Miley Cyrus; Brandon Baker; Giulia Boverio; Pax Baldwin; Kouki Okada; Bela Klentze	Kyle Massey (Captain); Jason Dolley; Emily Osment; Sabrina Bryan; Shin Koyamada; Andrea Guasch; Robson Nunes; Come Levin

=== Disney Channel Games 2008 ===
Host	The Red Team	The Blue Team	The Green Team	The Yellow Team
Brian Stepanek	Brenda Song (captain); Adrienne Bailon; Mitchel Musso; Jason Earles; Jake T. Austin; Nick Jonas; Jasmine Richards; Anna Maria Perez de Tagle; Deniz Akdeniz; Rafa Baronesi	Kiely Williams (captain); Cole Sprouse; Shin Koyamada; Demi Lovato; Alyson Stoner; Roshon Fegan; Isabella Soric; Farez bin Juraimi; Roger Gonzalez	David Henrie (captain); Jennifer Stone; Dylan Sprouse; Jason Dolley; Chelsea Staub; Joe Jonas; Ambra Lo Faro; Brad Kavanaugh; Clara Alonso	Kevin Jonas (captain); Kyle Massey; Sabrina Bryan; Moises Arias; Selena Gomez; Kunal Sharma; Andrea Guasch; Yi Chun; Martin Barlan

== Disney's Friends for Change Games ==
Disney's Friends for Change Games logo

Disney's Friends for Change Games aired on the Disney Channel as part of Disney's Friends for Change initiative. It replaced the Disney Channel Games. The series was hosted by Jason Earles and Tiffany Thornton, and again featured various Disney Channel stars as team-based contestants competing for their chosen charity. Disney's Friends for Change Games premiered on June 24, 2011, and aired five episodes through July 31, 2011, plus a recap special.

The first event was viewed by between 3.4 million and 4.9 million viewers. The finale special was viewed by 3.6 million viewers, with Kids 6–11 (1.9 million/7.7 rating) and Tweens 9–14 (1.6 million/6.4 rating) making up a sizable portion of the total. The entire series was viewed by over 37 million unique viewers.
