= Trop la Classe! =

- Country of origin: France
- No. of seasons: 5
- No. of episodes: 175

Production
- Running time: 5-7 minutes

Original release
- Network: Disney Channel France
- Release: April 10, 2006 – November 19, 2010

Trop la Classe! is a French television show adapted from As the Bell Rings. It is on Disney Channel France and airs on every Sunday cable broadcast. It is a French adaption of the Disney Channel Italy Original Series Quelli dell'intervallo.

The show's fifth season (Trop la Classe Verte!) begun airing from February 24, 2010, to November 19 of the same year.

== Characters ==
- Prem: Guilhem Simon

Prem is a whiz kid who is rather kind and helps his needy classmates.

- Dunk: Manon Azem

She is depicted as the athletic and tomboyish girl. Her best friend is Nico.

- Charlotte: Nina Melo

Charlotte is viewed as an annoyance as she cannot stay quiet.

- Valentine: Marieke Bouillette

Valentine is the most popular girl of the college. She is very concerned about appearances and finds it a priority that hers is perfect. All boys fall for her but the girls don't appreciate her massive ego and the curt reply. Her superiority complex creates great tension with Juliette and she is not very intelligent.

- Nico: Côme Levin

Nico is often seen as the class clown and is known for mischief. He often tells jokes which he finds funny but are not appreciated by his friends. His best friend is Dunk.

- Cleo: Garance Mazureck
- Theo: Gregory Gempp
- Arthur: Arthur Ligerot
- Juliette: Juliette Lopes Benites (Season 2)
- Spy: Paul Alexander Bardel
- Thomas: Gauthier Battouen (Season 2)
- Romain: (Season 3)
- Jeanne: Sophie Chen (Part of season 1)
- Dread: François Civil (Season 1)
- Nina: Cerise Bouvet
- Alice:
- Marine: (Season 3)
- Hugo:
- Vincent: Manu Garijo
