= Disney Channel (Turkey) =

Defunct Turkish children's TV channel

- Final logo used from 2017 to 31 March 2022
- Country: Turkey
- Broadcast area: Turkey; Northern Cyprus
- Headquarters: London, United Kingdom (formerly); Etiler, Istanbul, Turkey (current)

Programming
- Languages: Turkish (dubbing); English
- Picture format: SDTV 576i, 16:9

Ownership
- Owner: Disney Televizyon Yayıncılık A.Ş.
- Parent: The Walt Disney Company Limited (Disney International Operations)
- Sister channels: List: BabyTV; Disney Junior; Disney XD; Fox; National Geographic; National Geographic Wild

History
- Launched: 29 April 2007; 19 years ago (as part of Disney Channel EMEA); 12 January 2012; 14 years ago (independent)
- Closed: 31 March 2022; 4 years ago

Disney Channel was a Turkish free-to-air television network owned and operated by Disney Televizyon Yayıncılık A.Ş. (transl.: Disney Television Broadcasting Inc.); part of The Walt Disney Company Turkey. Broadcasting for children and youth-oriented shows in Turkish, targeted for ages 7 to 14 years old. There was also a Disney Junior block from 6am to 11am Monday through Thursday. In this way, it also appealed to smaller audiences. It is based on original United States channel of the same name.

== History ==
It launched on 29 April 2007 on Digiturk. All the programming were dubbed in Turkish, while the network was headquartered in Etiler, Istanbul. On 1 May 2011, Disney Channel updated the logo by putting the Mickey Mouse silhouette in a smartphone application icon. The same thing happened in other countries from Europe and CEE.

On 21 December 2011, Disney started the test transmission for the Turkish Disney Channel and started broadcasting mainly promotional ads; no advertising or programs included. It later became a free-to-air channel on 12 January 2012, with an episode of Phineas and Ferb as its first program.

On 28 October 2013, Disney Channel launched its VOD service in Turkey.

The channel was closed on 31 March 2022 (with "Ludo, Where Art Thou?" episode of Star vs. the Forces of Evil as its last program), and removed from the channel list 3 days later, on 2 April 2022, and its programming became part of Disney+ when it launched on 14 June 2022.

== Sister channels ==
=== Disney Jr. ===
Disney Jr.
- Logo used since 1 June 2024
- Type: Satellite network, available on Digiturk, Tivibu and D-Smart
- Country: United Kingdom
- Broadcast area: Turkey; Northern Cyprus
- Headquarters: 3 Queen Caroline Street, Hammersmith, London W6 9PE, United Kingdom

Programming
- Picture format: HDTV 1080i

Ownership
- Owner: The Walt Disney Company Limited

History
- Launched: October 2003; 23 years ago (as Fox Kids Play); 2004; 22 years ago (as Jetix Play); 1 September 2010; 16 years ago (as Playhouse Disney); 1 June 2011; 15 years ago (as Disney Junior)
- Former names: Fox Kids Play (2003–2004); Jetix Play (2004–2010); Playhouse Disney (2010–2011); Disney Junior (2011–2024)

Disney Jr. is a British-managed pre-school channel, under The Walt Disney Company Limited. It began as Disney Channel's morning block, known as Playhouse Disney on 29 April 2007. It launched as a television channel on 1 September 2010, and rebranded as Disney Junior on 1 June 2011.

As of 31 March 2022, Disney Jr. is currently the only Disney-branded channel in Turkey since the closure of Disney Channel.

=== Disney XD (closed) ===
Disney XD
- Final logo used from 1 September 2015 to 31 January 2021
- Type: Satellite network, exclusive to Digiturk
- Country: United Kingdom
- Broadcast area: Turkey; Northern Cyprus

Programming
- Language: Turkish

Ownership
- Owner: The Walt Disney Company Limited

History
- Launched: November 2000; 26 years ago (as Fox Kids); January 2005; 21 years ago (as Jetix); 3 October 2009; 17 years ago (as Disney XD)
- Closed: 31 January 2021; 5 years ago
- Former names: Fox Kids (2000–2005); Jetix (2005–2009)

Disney XD launched on 3 October 2009, becoming a 24-hour channel on 3 October 2018, and was exclusive to Digiturk.

On 31 January 2021, Disney XD was closed simultaneously with the discontinuation of the Japanese and Greece versions of the channel during the last three minutes of an episode of Dude, That's My Ghost!. However, Disney Channel continued to operate until 31 March 2022, with programming moving to Disney+ when it launched on 14 June 2022.

== Logos ==
=== Disney Channel ===
2007–2011

2011–2014

2014–2017

2017–2022

=== Disney Jr. ===
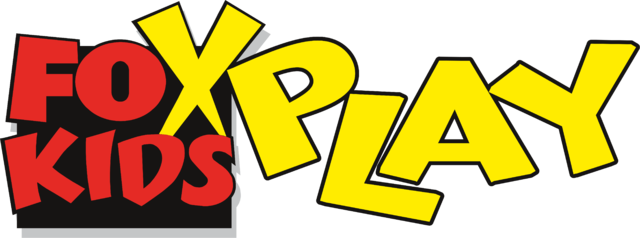
2003–2004

2010–2011

2019–2024

2024–present

=== Disney XD ===
2000–2005

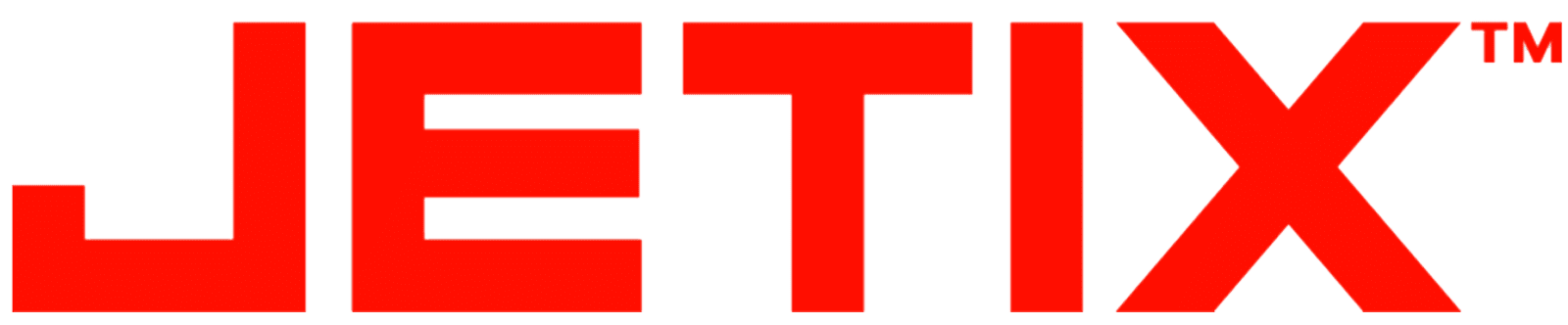
2005–2009

2009–2015

2015–2021
