= Kurze Pause =

- Also known as: Disney's Kurze Pause
- Country of origin: Germany
- No. of seasons: 5
- No. of episodes: 244

Production
- Running time: 5–8 minutes

Original release
- Network: Disney Channel Germany; Kabel eins
- Release: September 18, 2006 – September 8, 2009

Disney's Kurze Pause (Disney's Short Break) is a German sitcom series broadcast on Disney Channel Germany from 2006 to 2009, with no firm scheduling except for its Sunday broadcast. It consists of vignettes approximately five to eight minutes long.

It is a German adaptation of Disney Channel Italy's Quelli dell'intervallo, which has also been adapted for other international markets with the title As the Bell Rings

== Characters ==
- Moritz (Mo) – played by Bela Klentze
- Philip (Flip) – played by Benjamin Trinks
- Julia – played by Isabella Soric
- Katarina (Kata) – played by Sophie Belcredi
- Eberhard (Streberhard) – played by Lukas Nathrath
- Nico – played by Constantin
- Anton (Tonne) – played by Roland Schreglmann
- DJ – played by Lea Kalbhenn
- Rocky – played by Laelia Platzer
- Spy – played by Tobias Core
- Lilli – played by Julia Eggert
- Luca – played by Sabin Tambrea (Seasons 2–5)
- Stella – played by Amy Mußul (Seasons 3–5)
