= Miraculous: Tales of Ladybug & Cat Noir season 5 =

Miraculous: Tales of Ladybug & Cat Noir
- Season 5
- Promotional poster
- No. of episodes: 27

Release
- Original release: October 17, 2022 – November 1, 2023

Season chronology
- ← Previous; Season 4 Next → Season 6

The fifth season of Miraculous: Tales of Ladybug & Cat Noir which aired in France from 17 October 2022 to 1 November 2023, totaling 27 episodes.

This season follows Marinette Dupain-Cheng and Adrien Agreste as Ladybug and Cat Noir respectively, as they fight akumatized villains created by Monarch, who now possesses nearly all Miraculous.

== Episodes ==
No. overall	No. in season	English title French title	Directed by	Written by	Original air date (France)	U.S. air date	Prod. code	U.S. viewers (millions)
105	1	"Evolution" "Évolution"	Thomas Astruc; Wilfried Pain; Jun Violet; Cyril Adam; Nicolas Hess	Thomas Astruc; Mélanie Duval; Fred Lenoir; Sébastien Thibaudeau	17 October 2022	8 October 2022	501	0.21
Gabriel, now "Monarch", uses the Rabbit Miraculous to defeat Ladybug and Cat Noir in the past. Bunnyx brings the heroes to her Burrow, but she is paralyzed by Monarch. Cat Noir takes her Miraculous and fuses with it to become "Rabbit Noir", then follows Monarch through time. The latter collapses due to using too many Miraculouses, so Ladybug takes the Rabbit Miraculous, but he retrieves it. The heroes go to the past Master Fu to get the Dog Miraculous for the present Alix, who transforms into "Canigirl". Under orders from Nathalie, Monarch tries to prevent Emilie from using the damaged Peacock Miraculous but instead falls for a trap set by Ladybug. Alix retrieves the Rabbit Miraculous and is allowed to keep it; she travels through time to keep it safe. As a result, Nathalie chooses to no longer help Gabriel.: This episode premiered in Brazil on Gloob on 13 June 2022.; This episode aired in France on TFOU on 24 October 2022.
106	2	"Multiplication"	Thomas Astruc; Wilfried Pain; Jun Violet; Cyril Adam; Nicolas Hess	Thomas Astruc; Mélanie Duval; Fred Lenoir; Sébastien Thibaudeau	25 October 2022	15 October 2022	502	0.26
Ladybug and Cat Noir are scolded by Su-Han for not protecting the Miracle Box, but he apologizes for his harshness and goes to get reinforcements. Realizing Félix is behind everything, the heroes try to confront him in London, but they do not find him. In order not to distract themselves from fighting Monarch, Marinette tries to stop loving Adrien, while Adrien gives up his modeling and also starts developing feelings for Marinette. Weeks pass before Monarch makes another akumatization; he re-akumatizes Tomoe into Ikari Gozen with the Mouse Miraculous' power of Jubilation, with the Miraculous itself mysteriously out of sight. After her defeat, Tomoe and Gabriel launch their new brand of smart rings called "Alliance," displaying digital copies of Adrien and Lila. Meanwhile, Félix – who was secretly hiding in London the whole time – activates the Peacock Miraculous and meets Duusu, its kwami, for the first time.: This episode premiered in Brazil on Gloob on 20 June 2022.
107	3	"Destruction"	Thomas Astruc; Wilfried Pain; Jun Violet; Cyril Adam; Nicolas Hess	Thomas Astruc; Mélanie Duval; Fred Lenoir; Sébastien Thibaudeau	26 October 2022	22 October 2022	503	0.26
Gabriel tries to get the kwamis to reveal Ladybug's identity, but they only cryptically lead him to Marinette's room. This sets Monarch off on a scavenger hunt set up by Marinette, which culminates in him being cornered at the Musée Grévin by Ladybug and Cat Noir. They successfully tie him up, but he refuses to surrender and gets Cat Noir to accidentally Cataclysm him. He escapes with Ladybug's Lucky Charm, leaving himself with a serious scar on his arm that Ladybug cannot revert as a result. In the weeks that pass, Gabriel uses Tomoe's technology to trap the kwamis in cages and reform the Miraculouses into special Alliance rings that allow him to transfer Miraculous powers to his villains.: This episode premiered in Brazil on Gloob on 17 October 2022.
108	4	"Jubilation"	Thomas Astruc; Wilfried Pain; Jun Violet; Cyril Adam; Nicolas Hess	Thomas Astruc; Mélanie Duval; Fred Lenoir; Sébastien Thibaudeau	27 October 2022	29 October 2022	504	0.23
Mr. Damocles continues to try (and fail) to be The Owl, but Marinette's former classmate, Socqueline, comes to his rescue, dressed as Ladybug. Before Marinette can tell Socqueline how dangerous it is to impersonate Ladybug, she leaves for a mission wearing Socqueline's borrowed Alliance ring; Monarch tracks its movement and assumes Socqueline is Ladybug. He akumatizes Mr. Damocles into an upgraded version of Dark Owl called "Darker Owl" with the Pig Miraculous' power of Jubilation. After discovering that Socqueline is not Ladybug, he hypnotizes both Ladybug and Cat Noir with a vision of them defeating Monarch, marrying, and starting a family, but they break out of it and defeat him, much to their sadness. Later, Sabine gifts Marinette an Alliance ring, but she refuses.: This episode premiered in Brazil on Gloob on 24 October 2022.
109	5	"Determination" "Détermination"	Thomas Astruc; Wilfried Pain; Jun Violet; Cyril Adam; Nicolas Hess	Thomas Astruc; Mélanie Duval; Fred Lenoir; Sébastien Thibaudeau	28 October 2022	12 November 2022	506	0.28
Luka and Kagami notice that Adrien and Marinette are still uncertain about their feelings, so they arrange a date at the Musée Grévin. Adrien and Marinette both act awkwardly toward each other, so Kagami and Luka decide to lock them in a room to sort things out. Meanwhile, the museum's director Véronique attempts to unveil the statues of the temporary heroes, but Mayor Bourgeois objects to it, threatening to close the museum. Véronique is akumatized into "Manipula" who can bring the statues to life and is immune to Miraculous powers, thanks to the Ox Miraculous' power of Determination. During the fight, Ladybug starts falling in love with Cat Noir. However, after Manipula's defeat, Cat Noir does not notice her feelings and reaffirms his feelings for Marinette.
110	6	"Passion"	Thomas Astruc; Wilfried Pain; Jun Violet; Cyril Adam; Nicolas Hess	Thomas Astruc; Mélanie Duval; Fred Lenoir; Sébastien Thibaudeau	31 October 2022	19 November 2022	507	0.31
Adrien decides to get closer to Marinette while Marinette gloats about how amazing Cat Noir is. Meanwhile, Gabriel shoddily reveals his injury to Nathalie, who becomes heartbroken for Emilie. Seeing Gabriel's descent into madness, She asks to be akumatized into "Safari", a huntress who can never fail to catch her target, to claim the Ladybug and Cat Miraculouses for herself to protect Adrien. Using the Goat Miraculous' power of Passion, she draws herself weapons, including a crossbow that can shoot Miraculous powers. During the fight, Ladybug gets distracted by her feelings for Cat Noir and gets hit by Venom. After avoiding any other shots, the two swap their Miraculouses and become Lady Noire and Mister Bug to throw off Safari's trackers and defeat her.
111	7	"Reunion" "Réunion"	Thomas Astruc; Wilfried Pain; Jun Violet; Cyril Adam; Nicolas Hess	Thomas Astruc; Mélanie Duval; Fred Lenoir; Sébastien Thibaudeau	1 November 2022	26 November 2022	508	0.23
Marinette learns that the kwagatama can be used to summon the memories of previous Miraculous holders. She decides to contact Joan of Arc, who in her era was the superhero "Scarlet Fate", in order to ask about her romance with "Dark Grimalkin"— the then-Cat Miraculous holder from England—which upset their respective rulers. Meanwhile, Jalil is upset over the absence of his sister, believing social media's claims that Ladybug is evil for hiding her. He asks Monarch to akumatize him back into the Pharaoh to find out the truth himself, this time with the Turtle Miraculous' power of Protection and the ability to create walls with Maat's Book of Truth which can only be opened by answering trivia questions, trapping those who answer incorrectly. Ladybug convinces the Pharaoh to confirm her true intentions with the book, which leads the latter to willingly de-akumatize himself upon realizing that Monarch lied to him. Later, Gabriel apologizes to Nathalie, while Plagg gives Adrien his own kwagatama.
112	8	"Illusion"	Thomas Astruc; Wilfried Pain; Jun Violet; Cyril Adam; Nicolas Hess	Thomas Astruc; Mélanie Duval; Fred Lenoir; Sébastien Thibaudeau	2 November 2022	5 November 2022	505	0.27
To help Ladybug and Cat Noir find out how Monarch gives his villains Miraculous powers, Nino and his friends form a "resistance network" and intend to orchestrate an akumatization on Gabriel during a parent-teacher conference. However, Lila eavesdrops on their conversation and warns Gabriel beforehand, who then shows no emotion during their attempt. Knowing that he is being followed, he fakes his akumatization into the Collector with a detailed Mirage. Adrien successfully films the illusion, unaware that it does not portray the true process of applying the Miraculous powers. After his defeat, Nino accepts Gabriel and Lila as honorary members of their network, not knowing their true intentions.
113	9	"Elation" "Exaltation"	Thomas Astruc; Wilfried Pain; Jun Violet; Cyril Adam; Nicolas Hess	Thomas Astruc; Mélanie Duval; Fred Lenoir; Sébastien Thibaudeau	3 November 2022	3 December 2022	509	0.30
Alya chastises Marinette for pursuing Cat Noir while still secretly loving Adrien. The latter tries to speak to Marinette, but is forced to transform into Cat Noir and then runs into Marinette soon after. He takes her to André the ice cream maker, but he states his belief that Marinette should love Adrien and Cat Noir should love Ladybug, in which Cat Noir discovers Marinette's crush on Adrien. They try to ignore him and eventually kiss, but Cat Noir backs out after realizing he is taking advantage of Marinette, making her frustrated. She is nearly akumatized into "Unmasker", but she rejects the akuma which instead re-akumatizes André into Glaciator with the Tiger Miraculous' power of Elation. After his defeat, Cat Noir apologizes to Marinette and is reassured by Plagg that he can still be with her as Adrien.
114	10	"Transmission (The Kwamis' Choice – Part 1)" "Transmission (Le Choix des Kwamis – Partie 1)"	Thomas Astruc; Wilfried Pain; Jun Violet; Cyril Adam; Nicolas Hess	Thomas Astruc; Mélanie Duval; Fred Lenoir; Sébastien Thibaudeau	2 April 2023	22 April 2023	510	0.19
Despite their friends' coaching, Marinette still refuses to bond with Adrien and continues to blame herself for her emotions, breaking his heart. Seeing this, Tikki and Plagg decide to absolve them of their duties as heroes, replacing them with Alya as Scarabella and Zoé as "Kitty Noire". When Monarch senses Adrien's struggles, he tries to akumatize Adrien; this fails, and he redirects the akuma to Kouki, a kickboxer insulted by Nora. He is turned into "Kikou", a giant with the powers of the Turtle, Tiger, Ox, Horse, and Mouse Miraculouses. The new heroes defeat him while Marinette and Adrien slowly warm up to each other.: This episode premiered in Brazil on Gloob on 12 December 2022.; The French version of this episode was first shown in Switzerland on 11 February 2023.; The English version of this episode was first shown via Disney Channel EMEA on 27 January 2023.
115	11	"Deflagration (The Kwamis' Choice – Part 2)" "Déflagration (Le Choix des Kwamis – Partie 2)"	Thomas Astruc; Wilfried Pain; Jun Violet; Cyril Adam; Nicolas Hess	Thomas Astruc; Mélanie Duval; Fred Lenoir; Sébastien Thibaudeau	2 April 2023	22 April 2023	511	0.17
Using data from the Alliance rings, Monarch discovers the identities of Scarabella and Kitty Noire. He gives himself the powers of the Bee, Mouse, Rooster, Ox, and Horse Miraculouses, allowing him to split into invisible clones to spy on them. After akumatizing Chloé into "Sole Destroyer", a variant of Sole Crusher who can turn people into living shoes, Monarch paralyzes Alya and Zoé before they can transform and seizes their Miraculouses. He forces Tikki and Plagg to unify with him, but before they can do so, the former sends a Lucky Charm to Marinette while the latter destroys his Miraculous, causing a cycle of creation and destruction that threatens to erase the world. Monarch uses the Ladybug Miraculous to become "Monarchbug" and attempts to restore the Cat Miraculous, but Marinette tricks him into using a fake Lucky Charm, then retrieves her Miraculous. She reverts the damage and finds out about the reconfigured Miraculouses. Later, Tikki and Plagg return to their original owners, deeming it more important than their love story.: The French version of this episode was first shown in Switzerland on 18 February 2023.; The English version was first shown in Spain on Disney Channel on 25 March 2023.; This episode premiered in Brazil via Globoplay on 10 February 2023.
116	12	"Perfection"	Thomas Astruc; Wilfried Pain; Jun Violet; Cyril Adam; Nicolas Hess	Thomas Astruc; Mélanie Duval; Fred Lenoir; Sébastien Thibaudeau	9 April 2023	29 April 2023	512	0.17
Marinette continues to resist declaring her love for Adrien, coming to the point that when Adrien and Kitty Section perform a love song for her, she still cannot express herself. Alya and Kagami try to comfort her, but she rejects their advice, transforming into Ladybug to avoid them. Based on a charged checklist from Lila, Kagami is convinced that Marinette does not want to be her friend, allowing her to be akumatized into "Ryukomori", an intangible cloud giant with the Dragon Miraculous' power of Perfection and cannot see or hear. Ladybug and Cat Noir realize she just does not see herself as perfect enough to be friends with anyone, so they use a giant mosaic to show her that she is loved, leading her to de-akumatize herself. Realizing the parallels with her situation, Marinette decides to start listening to her friends. Tomoe later attacks Gabriel for endangering Kagami and reminds him that he owes her a very big price.: This episode premiered in Brazil on Gloob on 21 November 2022.; The French version of this episode was first shown in Switzerland on 18 February 2023.; The English version of this episode was first shown in Australia on ABC Me on 23 December 2022.
117	13	"Migration"	Thomas Astruc; Wilfried Pain; Jun Violet; Cyril Adam; Nicolas Hess	Thomas Astruc; Mélanie Duval; Fred Lenoir; Sébastien Thibaudeau	16 April 2023	6 May 2023	513	0.13
Luka acts as a therapist to help his friends with their secrets. After checking up on Jagged and Penny, who have started dating, he is visited by Bob Roth. He tricks Kitty Section into signing an extremely predatory contract; they realize this when he doubles down and fires everyone except Luka. Angered, Luka is almost re-akumatized into Silencer, but when Monarch finds out that he knows Ladybug and Cat Noir's secret identities, Luka forcibly breaks free from the akuma, which instead goes to Bob, transforming him into "Gold Record", who can use his vinyl record to turn people and things into records that play their innermost thoughts, as well as teleport with the Horse Miraculous' power of Migration. After the villain's defeat, Luka confesses his knowledge, then leaves Paris to travel the world with Jagged and Penny for his protection.: This episode premiered in Brazil on Gloob on 13 April 2023.
118	14	"Derision" "Dérision"	Thomas Astruc; Wilfried Pain; Jun Violet; Cyril Adam; Nicolas Hess	Thomas Astruc; Mélanie Duval; Fred Lenoir; Sébastien Thibaudeau	16 April 2023	13 May 2023	514	0.20
Marinette and Adrien go on a date at the pool, but the former suffers repeated panic attacks that nearly get her akumatized into "Panic". She breaks free after realizing her panic stems from a memory from when she had a crush on Kim in eighth grade, only to be traumatized when he pulled a sadistic prank disguised as a declaration of love. This redirects the akuma to Kim, who feels rebuffed by Ondine. He turns into "Dark Humor", a variant of Dark Cupid who makes people do dangerous pranks and has the Monkey Miraculous' power of Derision. After his defeat, Kim apologizes to Marinette. Later, Adrien confronts an unrepentant Chloé over her talking Kim into pranking Marinette and ends their friendship permanently.: This episode premiered in Brazil on Gloob on 14 April 2023.
119	15	"Intuition"	Thomas Astruc; Wilfried Pain; Jun Violet; Cyril Adam; Nicolas Hess	Thomas Astruc; Mélanie Duval; Fred Lenoir; Sébastien Thibaudeau	23 April 2023	17 June 2023	515	0.11
Monarch uses the Snake Miraculous' power of Intuition to get the best chance at winning, but Ladybug keeps defeating him; this worsens his scar, which begins to affect his organs. Going against Nathalie's wishes, he hacks an experimental spaceplane, tricking its AI Ada into believing her pilot, Claudie, died during a test flight. He then uses the Goat Miraculous to create an asteroid headed for Earth. Ladybug goes after the spaceship and gets captured by the akumatized version of the AI, "Bugfighter", while Cat Noir goes after the asteroid, only to be caught and paralyzed in a Shell-ter. Monarch then resets time; without Cat Noir, Ladybug tells Claudie to break out of the ship and disable Ada. The damage makes Ada realize her pilot is still alive, making her de-akumatize herself. No matter how many attempts Monarch makes, Ada always realizes the truth. With all the memories of his previous tries intact, Monarch eventually gives up. Later, Ladybug and Cat Noir reassure themselves that Monarch does not use the Snake Miraculous, unaware that Cat Noir found out in an erased timeline.: The English version of this episode was first shown via Disney Channel Europe on 30 May 2023.
120	16	"Protection"	Thomas Astruc; Wilfried Pain; Jun Violet; Cyril Adam; Nicolas Hess	Thomas Astruc; Mélanie Duval; Fred Lenoir; Sébastien Thibaudeau	30 April 2023	24 June 2023	516	0.16
Marinette's friends continue to try to get her and Adrien to confess, despite her clumsiness. On the other hand, Adrien and Kagami's parents try to force their children together. Adrien rejects both and decides to let his love for Marinette blossom naturally. They wind up having a date at the former's mansion, but Lila, knowing Gabriel's secret identity and motivations, orchestrates Kagami's akumatization into an upgraded version of Riposte called "Riposte Prime" who, in addition to her old powers, can apply shields with the Turtle Miraculous' power of Protection. After her defeat, Marinette and Adrien reaffirm their love for each other and inform Kagami of Lila's true intentions, causing her to warn Lila never to speak ill of Marinette again.: This episode premiered in Brazil on Gloob on 28 November 2022.; The French version of this episode was first shown in Quebec, Canada on 29 January 2023.; The English version of this episode was first shown in Australia on ABC Me on 24 December 2022.
121	17	"Adoration"	Thomas Astruc; Wilfried Pain; Jun Violet; Cyril Adam; Nicolas Hess	Thomas Astruc; Mélanie Duval; Fred Lenoir; Sébastien Thibaudeau	7 May 2023	1 July 2023	517	0.10
Two weeks before the end of the school year, Marinette and Zoé are tasked with organizing the school's end-of-year party. Zoé — now able to stand up for herself — allows Marinette to stay in her hotel room, earning Chloé's ire. She and Lila work together to get Sabrina akumatized back into Vanisher with the Dog Miraculous' power of Adoration, then use her to frame Marinette of theft, but Ladybug and Cat Noir de-akumatize Vanisher and clear things up. Later, Zoé admits she has feelings for Marinette, inspiring the latter to finally declare her love to Adrien. However, before they kiss, Gabriel mysteriously interrupts them.: This episode premiered in Brazil via Globoplay on 28 March 2023.; The English version of this episode was first shown via Disney Channel Europe on 1 June 2023.
122	18	"Emotion" "Émotion"	Thomas Astruc; Wilfried Pain; Jun Violet; Cyril Adam; Nicolas Hess	Thomas Astruc; Mélanie Duval; Fred Lenoir; Sébastien Thibaudeau	14 May 2023	8 July 2023	518	0.15
Adrien and Kagami are invited to the "Diamond Dance", a party for VIPs and their children, to be the king and queen of the event at the request of their parents. Marinette decides to join him, taking the place of Zoé, who ditched the event. There, she finds out "Adrien" is actually Félix in disguise. Using the Peacock Miraculous, he transforms into "Argos" and uses a sentimonster called "Red Moon" to erase people from existence, intending to create a world where he and his closest friends are free from other people's control. When Ladybug's Lucky Charm fails, she allows him to erase her away as part of her solution. When Adrien finds out about what Argos has done, the latter fails to bring Marinette back, forcing him to undo his actions. Realizing the error of his ways, Argos remorsefully releases Red Moon from its existence. Later, Kagami decides to stand up to her mother, but Adrien remains submissive.: This episode premiered in Brazil on Gloob on 21 November 2022.; The French version of this episode was first shown in Quebec, Canada on 4 February 2023.; The English version of this episode was first shown in Australia on ABC Me on 25 December 2022.
123	19	"Action"	Thomas Astruc; Wilfried Pain; Jun Violet; Cyril Adam; Nicolas Hess	Thomas Astruc; Mélanie Duval; Fred Lenoir; Sébastien Thibaudeau	10 September 2023	17 September 2023 (YouTube) 12 March 2024 (Netflix) 6 April 2024 (Disney+ & Disney Channel)	527	0.11
Noticing a lot of plastic pollution in the Seine, Marinette, Adrien, and their friends decide to campaign against it. The source of their problem is the plastic tycoon Bertrand King who had introduced plastic hand fans across the world with the help of Gabriel and Mayor Bourgeois. After the latter two are convinced to reverse their stance, Bertrand is akumatized into the "King of Plastic", who has the Bee Miraculous' power of Action and can turn anything he touches into plastic. After his defeat, Marinette's anti-plastic movement grows worldwide with Bertrand admitting that he was wrong about how harmful plastic pollution is.: This episode aired in France on TFOU on 17 September 2023.; The English version of this episode was first shown in Southeast Asia via Disney+ on 13 September 2023.
124	20	"Pretension" "Prétention"	Thomas Astruc; Wilfried Pain; Jun Violet; Cyril Adam; Nicolas Hess	Thomas Astruc; Mélanie Duval; Fred Lenoir; Sébastien Thibaudeau	23 October 2023	15 July 2023	519	0.15
Marinette stands up to Gabriel, but he cruelly refuses her demands for her and Adrien to be together. Félix, having recently become infatuated with Kagami, wants her to be free from an overbearing Tomoe, so he kidnaps her as Argos. Tomoe immediately requests to be akumatized into "Matagi Gozen", a mounted archer with the powers of the Bee, Horse, Mouse, and Rooster Miraculouses; the latter's power of Pretension allows her to choose any power she wants, which she uses to give her steed the ability to track scents. Ladybug and Cat Noir allow Argos to escape so they can protect Kagami, before de-akumatizing Matagi Gozen. Gabriel later reveals his intention to send Adrien to London, while Félix returns Kagami's ancient ring that her mother confiscated from her.: This episode premiered in Brazil on Gloob on 30 December 2022.; The French version of this episode was first shown in Switzerland on RTS Un on 20 May 2023.
125	21	"Revelation" "Révélation"	Thomas Astruc; Wilfried Pain; Jun Violet; Cyril Adam; Nicolas Hess	Thomas Astruc; Mélanie Duval; Fred Lenoir; Sébastien Thibaudeau	24 October 2023	19 July 2023 (Disney+) 22 July 2023 (Disney Channel)	520	0.13
Lila continues to con several people into getting her way, including three women who all believe she is their daughter. However, Gabriel fires her from his modeling outfit, replacing her with Kagami, due to her failure to separate Adrien and Marinette. Lila and Chloé successfully run against Marinette for class representative, with most of the students still believing Lila's lies. She then asks Monarch to akumatize her into "Hoaxer", a variant of Volpina whose Fox Miraculous powers now allow her to brainwash people through their Alliance rings, regardless of how absurd her lies may be. Marinette recruits Scarabella to accompany Cat Noir while she talks down Hoaxer, who de-akumatizes herself while pretending to make peace with Marinette. Having secretly gained information about Gabriel's past using her powers, Lila swears revenge against him.: This episode premiered in Brazil on Gloob on 30 December 2022.; The French version of this episode was first shown in Switzerland on RTS Un on 20 May 2023.
126	22	"Confrontation"	Thomas Astruc; Wilfried Pain; Jun Violet; Cyril Adam; Nicolas Hess	Thomas Astruc; Mélanie Duval; Fred Lenoir; Sébastien Thibaudeau	25 October 2023	29 July 2023	521	0.16
Marinette's class is tasked to submit forms indicating their chosen career path and where they want to attend lycée. Marinette collects the forms for Chloé and Lila, who falsify them in an attempt to frame Marinette to further alienate her. Juleka gets distraught over learning her doctored form claims she wants to repeat the school year, getting her re-akumatized into Reflekta with the Tiger Miraculous' power and the new ability to create clones that perfectly mirror her actions and movements. After Juleka gets de-akumatized, Marinette and a remorseful Sabrina expose the plot, making the school realize Lila's true nature. Mr. Damocles tries to expel the two girls, but Chloé uses her father's influence to prevent it. Ashamed of his actions, he is almost akumatized, but his optimism and Magical Charm purify the akuma; he then allows the students to resubmit their forms against the mayor's orders before voluntarily resigning. Later, Lila takes on the identity "Cerise Bianca" and reunites with people that she knows at another school.: This episode premiered in Switzerland on RTS Un on 27 May 2023.
127	23	"Collusion"	Thomas Astruc; Wilfried Pain; Jun Violet; Cyril Adam; Nicolas Hess	Thomas Astruc; Mélanie Duval; Fred Lenoir; Sébastien Thibaudeau	26 October 2023	5 August 2023	522	0.17
Lila manipulates Chloé into getting Marinette expelled and Miss Bustier fired by Ms. Mendeleiev, who became acting principal. Mayor André refuses Gabriel's offer for him and Tomoe to replace the Parisian police force with robots, unaware that Gabriel recorded the mayor reflecting on abusing his authority at his family's whim. Gabriel then doctors the footage to make André look abusive, provoking Miss Bustier into being akumatized into "Miss Sans-Culotte", giving her the Pig Miraculous' power in her quest to overthrow the mayor. André musters the courage to abdicate so Miss Bustier can de-akumatize herself. At Lila's advice, Chloé helps Gabriel and Tomoe stage a coup d'état and uses her power as acting mayor to brand Monarch, Ladybug, and Cat Noir as outlaws.: This episode premiered in Switzerland on RTS Un on 27 May 2023.
128	24	"Revolution" "Révolution"	Thomas Astruc; Wilfried Pain; Jun Violet; Cyril Adam; Nicolas Hess	Thomas Astruc; Mélanie Duval; Fred Lenoir; Sébastien Thibaudeau	27 October 2023	12 August 2023	523	0.15
On the last day of school, Lila influences Chloé into accepting Monarch's deal to be akumatized into "Queen Mayor", giving her police robots the powers of the Bee, Ox, Horse, Turtle, and Rooster Miraculouses. Chloé begins abusing her political power, unaware that Gabriel and Tomoe are using her to capture Ladybug and Cat Noir. The heroes try to stop her, only to be captured along with several "dissidents". At their urging, the Parisians fight back and help them escape and de-akumatize Queen Mayor; Ladybug and Cat Noir also upgrade their powers at the last minute, meaning they no longer have to detransform after using their powers. André exiles Audrey and Chloé from Paris before Adrien and Kagami are both sent to London by Gabriel. Abandoned by even Lila, Chloé attempts to torture Marinette once again over this, but it backfires, leaving her devastated and heartbroken over having lost everything that's ever mattered to her. Meanwhile, Lila acquires Tomoe's laptop and plots to use its data for her own agenda.: This episode premiered in Switzerland on RTS Un on 17 June 2023.
129	25	"Representation" "Représentation"	Thomas Astruc; Wilfried Pain; Jun Violet; Cyril Adam; Nicolas Hess	Thomas Astruc; Mélanie Duval; Fred Lenoir; Sébastien Thibaudeau	31 October 2023	19 August 2023	524	0.16
Distraught over arriving in London, Adrien transforms into Astrocat and plans to reveal his identity to Marinette. At the same time, Marinette leaves the end-of-year party and follows Félix (disguised as Adrien), who is accompanied by Kagami – who are both dating and now know Ladybug's identity – to the school. There, Félix uses a sentimonster named "Once Upon A Time" to put on a play that reveals himself to be a sentimonster and asks for Ladybug's help. Meanwhile, Gabriel akumatizes himself into "Nightormentor", who can induce nightmares and utilize the Horse Miraculous' power, to pursue Adrien. Cat Noir defeats him without Ladybug but is inflicted with a nightmare of being akumatized, forcing him back to London. Félix later returns Kagami to London before Gabriel and Tomoe confine her and Adrien. They commence "Operation Perfect Alliance", planning to end Ladybug and Cat Noir for good.: This episode premiered in Quebec, Canada on Télé-Québec on 10 June 2023.
130	26	"Conformation (The Final Day – Part 1)" "Conformation (Le Dernier Jour – Partie 1)"	Thomas Astruc; Wilfried Pain; Jun Violet; Cyril Adam; Nicolas Hess	Thomas Astruc; Mélanie Duval; Fred Lenoir; Sébastien Thibaudeau	1 November 2023	26 August 2023	525	0.16
To initiate Operation Perfect Alliance, Gabriel re-akumatizes himself into Nightormentor and spreads nightmares all over the world. He and Tomoe then release an Alliance app that shows people's desires in order to pacify them. Adrien reluctantly downloads the app but, fearing for his privacy, sends Plagg to give his Miraculous to Ladybug. The latter sneaks into Gabriel's house and finds out that he is Monarch. Nathalie also confesses to her that she was Mayura before finally passing out. Tomoe then interrupts everyone's Alliance feeds with a fake video of Ladybug and Cat Noir capturing Adrien and Kagami. This makes everyone vulnerable enough to be "Miraculized", turned into faceless robots that can channel any Miraculous power at will. They track down Ladybug, leading Monarch to his house. Just as he finds Marinette, Plagg joins her in time for her to unify the Ladybug and Cat Miraculouses into "Bug Noire".: The episode premiered in Switzerland on RTS Un on 1 July 2023.
131	27	"Re-creation (The Final Day – Part 2)" "Re-création (Le Dernier Jour – Partie 2)"	Thomas Astruc; Wilfried Pain; Jun Violet; Cyril Adam; Nicolas Hess	Thomas Astruc; Mélanie Duval; Fred Lenoir; Sébastien Thibaudeau	1 November 2023	2 September 2023	526	0.19
All around the world, citizens and superheroes help fight against the Miraculized. As this happens, Bug Noire fights Monarch in the Agreste mansion, eventually regaining most of the reconfigured Miraculouses and making him surrender. Realizing that he ruined Adrien's life, Gabriel paralyzes Marinette to steal the Ladybug and Cat Miraculouses. He fuses Tikki and Plagg into "Gimmi", the kwami of Reality, who grants his wish of saving Nathalie's life at the cost of his own after he tells Marinette to keep his identity a secret. The whole universe is recreated as a result. Paris is now an environmentalist city headed by Miss Bustier, Adrien has returned to Paris, and all of Ladybug's allies, including Argos, are on the same side and keep their Miraculouses permanently. Now operating under a new identity, Lila finds the Butterfly Miraculous.: The episode premiered in Switzerland on RTS Un on 1 July 2023.; The English version of this episode was first shown in Canada on Family Channel on 1 September 2023.
