= Miraculous: Tales of Ladybug & Cat Noir season 3 =

Miraculous: Tales of Ladybug & Cat Noir
- Season 3
- Promotional poster
- No. of episodes: 26

Release
- Original release: April 14 – December 8, 2019

Season chronology
- ← Previous; Season 2 Next → Season 4

The third season of Miraculous: Tales of Ladybug & Cat Noir which aired in France from 14 April 2019 to 8 December 2019, totaling 26 episodes.

This season follows Marinette Dupain-Cheng and Adrien Agreste as Ladybug and Cat Noir, respectively, as they protect Paris from akumatized villains created by Hawk Moth and sentimonsters created by Mayura.

== Episodes ==
No. overall	No. in season	English title French title	Directed by	Written by	Original air date (France)	U.S. release date	Prod. code
53	1	"Backwarder" "Rebrousse-Temps"	Thomas Astruc; Jun Violet; Benoît Boucher	Thomas Astruc; Fred Lenoir; Sébastien Thibaudeau	14 April 2019	1 August 2019	304
Master Fu falls ill and asks Marinette to deliver a prescription to the pharmacy and a love letter to his old love Marianne. Inspired, Marinette also writes a love letter to Adrien. However, she mixes up the letters, making Marianne believe Fu stopped caring for her. She is akumatized into "Backwarder", who can turn back her victims' personal timestreams. During the battle, Hawk Moth learns she knows the Guardian of the Miraculous. After her defeat, Fu and Marianne reunite, but cannot remain together until Hawk Moth is defeated.: This episode first premiered in Canada on Family Channel on 12 February 2019.; The French version was first shown in Switzerland on RTS Un on 24 February 2019.
54	2	"Weredad" "Papa Garou"	Thomas Astruc; Jun Violet; Lucie Gardes	Thomas Astruc; Mélanie Duval; Fred Lenoir; Sébastien Thibaudeau	21 April 2019	1 August 2019	306
After defeating Gigantitan again, Cat Noir nearly sees Ladybug detransform. To keep her identity secret, Marinette claims she is in love with Cat Noir, which her father, Tom, hears. The next day, Tom invites Cat Noir for lunch, but he turns Marinette down. Saddened over the rejection, Tom is akumatized into "Weredad", a werewolf-like bodyguard. After his defeat, Cat Noir reveals he thought Marinette was just a fan.: This episode first premiered in Switzerland on RTS Kids on 30 December 2018.; The English version was first shown in Canada on Family Channel on 6 February 2019.
55	3	"Chameleon" "Caméléon"	Thomas Astruc; Wilfried Pain; Jun Violet	Thomas Astruc; Mélanie Duval; Fred Lenoir; Sébastien Thibaudeau	28 April 2019	1 August 2019	301
Lila returns to class and continues to charm and manipulate her classmates through lies. Marinette tries to expose her, but Lila threatens to ruin her life for her attempting. Marinette is almost akumatized, but Lila willingly takes the akuma and becomes "Chameleon", who can mimic anyone by kissing them. Ladybug defeats Chameleon and suggests a truce, but Lila feigns agreement, intending to get revenge on both Ladybug and Marinette.: This episode first premiered in Spain on Disney Channel on 1 December 2018, with an English version made available on secondary audio. It also premiered in Portugal.; The French version was first shown in Switzerland on RTS Kids on 22 December 2018.
56	4	"Animaestro"	Thomas Astruc; Jun Violet	Thomas Astruc; Mélanie Duval; Sébastien Thibaudeau	5 May 2019	1 August 2019	302
At the premiere of an animated film about Ladybug and Cat Noir, Marinette attempts to give Adrien a macaron she made for him, but Kagami shows up. Marinette and Chloé (who also dislikes Kagami) work together to keep Kagami away from Adrien. When they fail, Chloé learns about Marinette's crush. Meanwhile, the film's director Thomas Astruc becomes despondent when no one appreciates his work as a director. He is akumatized into "Animaestro", who can transform into various 2D characters.: Guest star: Thomas Astruc as himself / Animaestro in the French version.; This episode first premiered in the UK and Ireland on Disney Channel on 12 March 2019.; The French version was first shown in Switzerland on RTS Un on 24 March 2019.
57	5	"Bakerix" "Boulangerix"	Thomas Astruc; Jun Violet	Thomas Astruc; Fred Lenoir; Sébastien Thibaudeau	12 May 2019	1 August 2019	303
It is Tom's 40th birthday, and Marinette decides to convince her paternal grandfather Rolland to celebrate. However, she discovers he has an extreme disdain for anything he considers non-traditional, and once had a falling out with Tom. The encounter agitates Rolland enough for him to transform into "Bakerix", a bread-themed Gaul who can grow larger by drinking yeast. Once defeated, Rolland reconciles with his son, to everyone's delight.: This episode first premiered in Switzerland on RTS Un on 4 May 2019.; The English version was first shown in Spain on Disney Channel on 11 May 2019.
58	6	"Silencer" "Silence"	Thomas Astruc; Jun Violet	Thomas Astruc; Mélanie Duval; Fred Lenoir; Sébastien Thibaudeau	19 May 2019	1 August 2019	307
Bob Roth hosts a fake music video contest for young artists. Luka, Juleka, Rose, and Ivan's band, Kitty Section, enter, but are plaigiarized by XY, Roth's son. Marinette and Luka confront Roth, but are dismissed. The unhappy Luka is akumatized into "Silencer", who can steal voices and imitate them with his hands. After his defeat, Roth unknowingly confesses to the scheme on live television, and gives Kitty Section a record deal to save his reputation. Luka then confesses his love for Marinette.: This episode first premiered in Switzerland on RTS Un on 7 April 2019.; The English version was first shown in Spain on Disney Channel on 13 May 2019.
59	7	"Oblivio"	Thomas Astruc; Wilfried Pain; Nicolas Hess	Thomas Astruc; Mélanie Duval; Jean-Rémi Perrin; Sébastien Thibaudeau	26 May 2019	1 August 2019	310
Ladybug and Cat Noir wake up in an elevator, unable to remember anything. As their civilian forms, they quickly deduce they are superheroes that are deeply in love, their memories erased by the supervillain "Oblivio". They manage to defeat it, revealed to be Alya and Nino merged into one. Ladybug and Cat Noir kiss, then the former uses her Lucky Charm to activate her world-restoring Miraculous Ladybug ability, restoring their original memories but erasing those created when they fought Oblivio.: This episode first premiered in the UK and Ireland on Disney Channel on 18 March 2019.; The French version was first shown in Switzerland on RTS Un on 31 March 2019.
60	8	"Stormy Weather 2" "Climatika 2"	Thomas Astruc; Wilfried Pain	Thomas Astruc; Mélanie Duval; Fred Lenoir; Sébastien Thibaudeau	2 June 2019	1 February 2020	317
Chloé picks on Aurore, now an actual weather girl, due to her low grades. She is transformed back into Stormy Weather, now able to control all forces of nature. She creates an enormous volcano to plunge the Earth into a perpetual winter and knock the planet off its orbit. Throughout the episode, everyone reminisces about their past up to this point.: This episode first premiered in Canada on Family Channel on 14 February 2019.; The French version was first shown in Switzerland on RTS Un on 17 March 2019.
61	9	"Reflekdoll" "Poupéflekta"	Thomas Astruc; Jun Violet; Joanna Celse	Thomas Astruc; Mélanie Duval; Fred Lenoir; Sébastien Thibaudeau	21 October 2019	1 February 2020	305
Luka convinces Juleka to be a model for Marinette's fashion blog. Alya invites Adrien to help out, so he can bond with Marinette. Juleka grows severely anxious, so Marinette takes her place. She and Adrien take off their Miraculouses for the photoshoot, leaving Juleka alone. She is turned back into Reflekta, and is given a sentimonster named "Reflekdoll ("Poupéflekta" in the French version), who can shoot lasers that turn people into Reflekta copies. Plagg and Tikki recover their Miraculouses and give them to each other's holders, turning Marinette into "Lady Noire" and Adrien into "Mister Bug". After returning their jewels, Marinette and Adrien let Juleka model as she originally wished.: This episode first premiered in the UK and Ireland on Disney Channel on 3 September 2019. It also premiered in Canada on Family Channel.; The French version was first shown in Switzerland on RTS Un on 14 September 2019.
62	10	"Oni-Chan"	Thomas Astruc; Jun Violet	Thomas Astruc; Mélanie Duval; Fred Lenoir; Sébastien Thibaudeau	21 October 2019	1 August 2019	308
Lila dupes Adrien into spending time with her. To get Gabriel's attention and to spite Marinette as she threatened before, Lila sends a picture of her kissing Adrien to all his classmates. When Kagami receives the picture, she flies into a jealous rage. She is akumatized into "Oni-Chan", an oni who curses Lila with a horn on her forehead that allows her to be constantly pursued. During the battle, Lila secretly helps Oni-Chan defeat the heroes, impressing Hawk Moth. After Oni-Chan's defeat, Adrien warns Lila not to hurt his loved ones. Later, Gabriel and Lila strike up an alliance.: This episode first premiered in Switzerland on RTS Un on 4 May 2019.; The English version was first shown in Spain on Disney Channel on 13 May 2019.
63	11	"Miraculer" "Miraculeur"	Thomas Astruc; Jun Violet; Christophe Yoshida	Thomas Astruc; Matthieu Choquet; Mélanie Duval; Sébastien Thibaudeau	22 October 2019	1 August 2019	309
Hawk Moth plots to wither Chloé's trust in Ladybug. He has Mayura create a sentimonster, and Lila teaches Chloé a phony dance that she claims will make Ladybug summon her. When it fails, Chloé is attracted to an akuma, but she resists, and it instead goes to Sabrina, who becomes "Miraculer", able to steal the heroes' powers. Ladybug calls upon all her allies, including Chloé, to fight her. After the battle, Ladybug tells Chloé that she cannot be Queen Bee, since everyone, including Hawk Moth, knows her identity.: This episode first premiered in Spain on Disney Channel on 15 May 2019, with an English version made available on secondary audio.; The French version was first shown in Switzerland on RTS Un on 18 May 2019.
64	12	"The Puppeteer 2" "La Marionnettiste 2"	Thomas Astruc; Jun Violet	Thomas Astruc; Mélanie Duval; Fred Lenoir; Sébastien Thibaudeau	23 October 2019	1 August 2019	321
Adrien has a wax statue of him made at the Musée Grévin, and Nino, Alya, Marinette, and Manon accompany him. At the museum, Alya and Nino leave Marinette and Adrien alone to try and hook them up. Manon, left alone, is akumatized back into the Puppeteer, this time able to bring wax statues of previous villains to life, regaining all their powers. After the Puppeteer's defeat, Marinette learns that Adrien likes another girl.: This episode first premiered in Switzerland on RTS Un on 13 July 2019.
65	13	"Desperada"	Thomas Astruc; Wilfried Pain	Thomas Astruc; Mélanie Duval; Wilfried Pain; Sébastien Thibaudeau	24 October 2019	1 February 2020	311
Jagged Stone approaches the Couffaine residence, looking for a guitarist to replace Vivica, the one he fired. However, Vivica attacks, transformed into "Desperada", whose instrument-themed weapons can turn anyone into stickers. Ladybug gives the Snake Miraculouses and its kwami Sass to Adrien, who, in a bid to woo Ladybug directly, uses it to transform into "Aspik". However, despite the retries provided by his "Second Chance" power, he fails to defeat Desperada. Ladybug instead gives the Snake Miraculous to Luka, who transforms into "Viperion" and successfully defeats the villain.: In this episode, a character appears based on a real person named Vivica, who won a contest at the Miraculous panel at L.A. Comic Con 2016. She was supposed to be a veterinarian, but it was changed.; This episode first premiered in the UK and Ireland on Disney Channel on 5 September 2019.; The French version was first shown in Switzerland on RTS Un on 5 October 2019.
66	14	"Startrain"	Thomas Astruc; Wilfried Pain; Christophe Yoshida	Thomas Astruc; Mélanie Duval; Fred Lenoir; Sébastien Thibaudeau	25 October 2019	1 February 2020	313
Marinette's class has a field trip to London, so Master Fu gives her the Horse Miraculous, whose Voyage ability can be used to teleport, in case she needs to return to Paris. They take a Startrain driven by Claudie, Max's mother who has taken an exam to be an astronaut. A rogue akuma accidentally gets on board, and infects Claudie when she grows anxious over whether she passed. She becomes "Startrain", who controls the now space-faring train. Ladybug gives Max the Horse Miraculous; with its kwami, Kaalki, he turns into "Pegasus". With his aid, the heroes teleport back to Earth and defeat Startrain.: This episode first premiered in Canada on Family Channel on 16 September 2019.; The French version was first shown in Switzerland on RTS Un on 12 October 2019.
67	15	"Kwamibuster" "Chasseuse de Kwamis"	Thomas Astruc; Wilfried Pain; Charles Schnek	Thomas Astruc; Mélanie Duval; Fred Lenoir; Sébastien Thibaudeau	27 October 2019	1 February 2020	314
Science teacher Ms. Mendeleiev nearly catches Tikki and Plagg. She attempts to prove their existence on a TV show, but is dismissed by their "experts". She is akumatized into "Kwamibuster", with a vacuum that can capture kwamis. Both heroes lose their kwamis, so Marinette has Mullo of the Mouse Miraculous transform her into "Multimouse", with the power of Multitude that splits herself into tiny clones. Some of her clones "unify" with other kwamis, allowing them to use other powers. Ladybug and Cat Noir make sure they do not discover each other's identities, then defeat Kwamibuster.: This episode first premiered in Switzerland on RTS Un on 12 October 2019.; The English version was first shown in Spain on Disney Channel on 12 October 2019.
68	16	"Feast" "Festin"	Thomas Astruc; Wilfried Pain	Thomas Astruc; Fred Lenoir; Sébastien Thibaudeau	28 October 2019	1 February 2020	315
Alya uncovers the existence of an Order of Guardians, noticing a symbol – the same one on the Miracle Box – on several exhibits at the Louvre. Master Fu notices one of them is a sentimonster he created in his youth, whose desire for the Miraculouses destroyed the Order, with the Butterfly and Peacock Miraculouses lost in the chaos. Mayura brings the monster to life in order for it to be akumatized into "Feast", giving it the ability to track down the Miraculouses. During the battle, Hawk Moth and Mayura learn who the Guardian is, so Fu decides to train Marinette as his successor.: This episode first premiered in Canada on Family Channel on 17 September 2019.; The French version was first shown in Switzerland on RTS Un on 19 October 2019.
69	17	"Ikari Gozen"	Thomas Astruc; Jun Violet; Cyril Adam	Thomas Astruc; Mélanie Duval; Fred Lenoir; Sébastien Thibaudeau	29 October 2019	1 February 2020	318
Marinette and Kagami participate in a friend-making game to find a hidden celebrity – this year, Adrien. Marinette, originally opposed to the pairing, discovers Kagami is actually lonely and wants to make a friend. Her mother, Tomoe, displeased that Kagami took part in the game without her permission, is akumatized into "Ikari Gozen", a centaur with a bokken. Kagami receives the Dragon Miraculous, giving her the ability to transform into wind, water, or lightning, and meets its kwami, Longg. She transforms into "Ryuko" and helps the heroes defeat Ikari Gozen, but she inadvertently reveals her identity to Hawk Moth. Later, Marinette and Kagami become friends.: This episode was exclusively previewed on 19 July 2019 at SDCC 2019.; The official TV premiere of this episode was in Canada on Family Channel on 18 September 2019.; The French version was first shown in Switzerland on RTS Un on 26 October 2019.
70	18	"Timetagger"	Thomas Astruc; Jun Violet; Cyril Adam	Thomas Astruc; Mélanie Duval; Fred Lenoir; Sébastien Thibaudeau	30 October 2019	1 February 2020	319
After defeating Mr. Pigeon for the 24th time, Ladybug and Cat Noir are attacked by "Timetagger", a creation of the future Hawk Moth (who is not Gabriel) able to send people through time, who has come from the future to seize their Miraculouses before they become adults. The two are forced to retreat into the Louvre, where they meet Alix, whose watch has delivered a message asking them to destroy a certain statue. Inside is "Bunnyx", a future version of Alix who wields the Rabbit Miraculous. With help from her and their future selves, the heroes defeat Timetagger, who happens to be a future version of Chris, Nino's brother.: This episode first premiered in Switzerland on RTS Un on 18 May 2019.; The English version was first shown in Spain on Disney Channel on 25 May 2019.
71	19	"Party Crasher" "Trouble Fête"	Thomas Astruc; Wilfried Pain; Nicolas Hess	Thomas Astruc; Mélanie Duval; Fred Lenoir; Sébastien Thibaudeau	31 October 2019	1 August 2019	320
Nino, Kim, Ivan, and Max throw a secret party for Adrien, which every boy in Paris plus Marinette in disguise attends. When Wayhem is unable to get in, he becomes despondent and is akumatized into "Party Crasher", who can predict his foes' movements and capture them in his disco balls. He captures Ladybug, forcing Master Fu to recruit Carapace, Viperion, and Pegasus, but they are caught as well. Desperate, Fu gives the Monkey Miraculous and its kwami Xuppu to Kim, turning him into "King Monkey". With his "Uproar" ability, he disrupts Party Crasher's powers, freeing the heroes and allowing them to defeat him.: Cameo: Thomas Astruc as himself.; This episode first premiered in Switzerland on RTS Un on 6 July 2019.
72	20	"Gamer 2.0"	Thomas Astruc; Wilfried Pain; Manon Serda	Thomas Astruc; Mélanie Duval; Sébastien Thibaudeau; Fred Lenoir	3 November 2019	1 August 2019	316
Max wants to find someone to test a tournament game he created, but everyone, including Marinette, is busy. Depressed, he is akumatized into "Gamer 2.0", who forces Ladybug and Cat Noir into a real-life version of his game, with past akumatized victims as the playable characters.: This episode first premiered in Switzerland on RTS Kids on 15 June 2019.; The English version was first shown in Australia on ABC Me on 11 July 2019.
73	21	"Cat Blanc" "Chat Blanc"	Thomas Astruc	Thomas Astruc; Mélanie Duval; Fred Lenoir; Sébastien Thibaudeau	10 November 2019	1 February 2020	322
Encouraged by her friends, Marinette leaves a signed gift for Adrien. However, she transforms into Ladybug to do it, so when Adrien sees her leaving, he deduces her identity. Bunnyx brings her to the future, where Paris has been destroyed by an evil version of Cat Noir called "Cat Blanc". From her time portal, the Burrow, Bunnyx observes Marinette and Adrien start a relationship but Gabriel manipulates them to break up so he can akumatize Marinette, only for Cat Noir to transform to protect her. Witnessing this, Hawk Moth reveals his plan to revive his wife, breaking Cat Noir down in order for him to be akumatized with the power of ultimate destruction. The present Ladybug de-akumatizes Cat Blanc, and prevents the temporal catastrophe, wiping Cat Blanc from existence.: This episode first premiered in Switzerland on RTS Un on 9 November 2019.; The English version was first shown in the UK and Ireland on Disney Channel on 12 November 2019.
74	22	"Félix"	Thomas Astruc	Thomas Astruc; Mélanie Duval; Fred Lenoir; Sébastien Thibaudeau	17 November 2019	1 February 2020	323
On the first anniversary of Emilie's disappearance, all of Adrien's friends send him video messages wishing him well. Adrien's aunt, Amelie Graham de Vanily, and his cousin, Félix Fathom, visit from London. Amelie demands that Gabriel return his and Emilie's wedding rings, which are family heirlooms, but he refuses. Angry at the Agrestes for not attending his father's funeral, Félix disguises himself as Adrien and spitefully replies to the messages. His hostility shocks Alya, Juleka, and Rose, who transform back into Lady Wifi, Reflekta, and Princess Fragrance, forming the "Punishers Trio". During the fight, Félix offers to help Hawk Moth if he gives him the rings. Afterwards, Félix apologizes to Adrien, then secretly steals Gabriel's ring, which he returns to his mother.: This episode first premiered in the UK and Ireland on Disney Channel on 13 November 2019.; The French version was first shown in Switzerland on RTS Un on 16 November 2019.
75	23	"Ladybug"	Thomas Astruc; Wilfried Pain; Isabelle Lemaux	Thomas Astruc; Mélanie Duval; Fred Lenoir; Sébastien Thibaudeau	24 November 2019	1 February 2020	324
Lila frames Marinette for several crimes to turn her friends against her. Mr. Damocles falls for it and expels Marinette. Hawk Moth turns Nathalie back into Catalyst so he can become Scarlet Moth and re-akumatize everybody. However, Catalyst becomes sick, which cancels the procedure. Gabriel forbids Nathalie from using the Peacock Miraculous to protect her health. However, she goes behind his back and forges a sentimonster in Ladybug's image. Ladybug and Cat Noir redeem the false Ladybug and almost unmask Mayura, but she escapes. Later, Marinette is allowed to go back to school, while Gabriel rewards Lila with being a model.: This episode first premiered in Canada on Family Channel on 10 September 2019.; The French version was first shown in Switzerland on RTS Un on 16 November 2019.
76	24	"Christmaster" (Note: This episode was presented as Chris Master. But according to Thomas Astruc, the correct English name is Christmaster.) "Maître Noël"	Thomas Astruc; Jun Violet; Joanna Celse	Thomas Astruc; Mélanie Duval; Fred Lenoir; Sébastien Thibaudeau	1 December 2019	1 August 2019	312
Marinette babysits Chris while Nino and Alya see a movie. When Chris finds a chest containing gifts for Adrien, Marinette claims that she is one of Santa's helpers and that the gifts are Christmas gifts. Wanting Christmas to come early, Chris becomes "Christmaster", who controls an army of toys that seek Santa Claus.: Guest star: Philippe Candeloro as Philippe in the French version.; This episode first premiered in Canada on Family Channel on 8 February 2019.; The French version was first shown in Switzerland on RTS Un on 10 March 2019.
77	25	"Heart Hunter (The Battle of the Miraculous – Part 1)" "Mangeamour (La Bataille des Miraculous – Partie 1)"	Thomas Astruc; Wilfried Pain; Nicolas Hess	Thomas Astruc; Matthieu Choquet; Mélanie Duval; Fred Lenoir; Sébastien Thibaudeau	8 December 2019	1 February 2020	325
Marinette, Adrien, and Kagami leave the Bourgeois couple's twentieth anniversary, which their parents all brought them to, in order to have fun by themselves. Marinette leaves Adrien and Kagami alone together, seeing how happy they are. The Bourgeoises, having gotten into an argument, are fused into "Heart Hunter", a two-faced floating head that consumes love. Ladybug decides to recruit Ryuko, but Hawk Moth follows her to Master Fu, allowing him to claim the Miracle Box, which contains all the Miraculouses. Chloé, feeling snubbed, is influenced by Hawk Moth into turning against Ladybug, giving her the Bee Miraculous and de-akumatizing her parents. She is then turned into "Miracle Queen". When Marinette discovers Master Fu's absence, she has a breakdown in Luka's arms.: Cameo: Josiane Balasko as Sarah.; This episode first premiered in Ukraine on PLUSPLUS on 13 October 2019.; The English version was first shown in the UK and Ireland on Disney Channel on 23 November 2019.; The French version was first shown in Switzerland on RTS Un on 23 November 2019.
78	26	"Miracle Queen (The Battle of the Miraculous – Part 2)" "Miracle Queen (La Bataille des Miraculous – Partie 2)"	Thomas Astruc; Wilfried Pain; Jun Violet	Thomas Astruc; Matthieu Choquet; Mélanie Duval; Fred Lenoir; Sébastien Thibaudeau	8 December 2019	1 February 2020	326
Miracle Queen sends out a swarm of bees whose stings brainwash their victims. She summons all the temporary Miraculous holders, revealing their identities. Ladybug uses the Dragon Miraculous to unify into "Dragon Bug", and recovers the Snake Miraculous for Cat Noir to unify into "Snake Noir". Together, they battle their brainwashed allies and defeat Miracle Queen. Master Fu, as a turtle hero named "Jade Turtle" and being at Hawk Moth and Mayura's mercy, sacrifices his memories, formally transferring the title of Guardian of the Miraculous to Ladybug, who recovers the Miracle Box. Chloé is expelled from the superhero team, and she refuses to forgive Ladybug. In the aftermath, Fu reunites with Marianne, and the two leave Paris. Marinette and Adrien start dating Luka and Kagami respectively, while Nathalie recovers Fu's tablet, which contains the decrypted spellbook.: This episode first premiered in Ukraine on PLUSPLUS on 15 October 2019.; The English version was first shown in Spain on Disney Channel on 23 November 2019.; The French version was first shown in Switzerland on RTS Un on 23 November 2019.
