= Miraculous: Tales of Ladybug & Cat Noir season 4 =

Miraculous: Tales of Ladybug & Cat Noir
- Season 4
- Promotional poster
- No. of episodes: 26

Release
- Original release: April 11, 2021 – March 13, 2022

Season chronology
- ← Previous; Season 3 Next → Season 5

The fourth season of Miraculous: Tales of Ladybug & Cat Noir which aired in France from 11 April 2021 to 13 March 2022, totaling 26 episodes.

This season follows Marinette Dupain-Cheng and Adrien Agreste as Ladybug and Cat Noir respectively, alongside their superhero team, fighting akumatized villains and sentimonsters created by Shadow Moth.

== Episodes ==
No. overall	No. in season	English title French title	Directed by	Written by	Original air date (France)	U.S. air date	Prod. code	U.S. viewers (millions)
79	1	"Truth" "Vérité"	Thomas Astruc; Wilfried Pain; Jun Violet; Cyril Adam; Nicolas Hess	Thomas Astruc; Mélanie Duval; Fred Lenoir; Sébastien Thibaudeau	11 April 2021	21 June 2021	401	0.45
Gabriel unifies the repaired Peacock Miraculous with his Butterfly Miraculous to become "Shadow Moth". Meanwhile, Marinette's relationship with Luka fractures when she is forced to ditch several of their dates to protect Paris as Ladybug. When Marinette is unable to tell him the truth behind her disappearances, he is akumatized into "Truth", who, with his sentimonster, "Light Eye", can force people to tell the truth. He finds out Jagged Stone is his and Juleka's father, but not Marinette's secret. After his defeat, Marinette decides to break up with Luka.: This episode premiered in Switzerland on RTS Un on 3 April 2021.; The English version of this episode was first shown in Portugal on Disney Channel on 15 May 2021.
80	2	"Lies" "Mensonge"	Thomas Astruc; Wilfried Pain; Jun Violet; Cyril Adam; Nicolas Hess	Thomas Astruc; Mélanie Duval; Fred Lenoir; Sébastien Thibaudeau	18 April 2021	22 June 2021	402	0.40
Adrien's relationship with Kagami fractures when he is forced to ditch several of their dates to protect Paris as Cat Noir. Having caught him lying to cover up his disappearances, Kagami becomes heartbroken and breaks up with Adrien, being akumatized into "Lies", who can paralyze anyone who has ever lied.: Guest star: Josiane Balasko as herself in the French version.; This episode premiered in Switzerland on RTS Un on 10 April 2021.; The English version of this episode was first shown in Spain on Vodafone TV on 19 May 2021.
81	3	"Gang of Secrets" "Le Gang des Secrets"	Thomas Astruc; Wilfried Pain; Jun Violet; Cyril Adam; Nicolas Hess	Thomas Astruc; Mélanie Duval; Fred Lenoir; Sébastien Thibaudeau	25 April 2021	23 June 2021	403	0.49
Worried about Marinette constantly keeping secrets, Alya, Juleka, Rose, Alix, and Mylène come to her house to talk. They almost discover the Miracle Box, forcing Marinette to lash out at them to make them leave. Devastated, Marinette's friends are akumatized back into Lady Wifi, Reflekta, Princess Fragrance, Timebreaker, and Horrificator as the "Gang of Secrets". Ladybug successfully helps Alya de-akumatize herself then recruits her as Rena Rouge to help defeat the others. After the victory, Marinette tells Alya that she is Ladybug.: This episode premiered in Switzerland on RTS Un on 17 April 2021.; The English version of this episode was first shown in Spain on Vodafone TV on 19 May 2021.
82	4	"Mr. Pigeon 72" "M. Pigeon 72"	Thomas Astruc; Wilfried Pain; Jun Violet; Cyril Adam; Nicolas Hess	Thomas Astruc; Mélanie Duval; Fred Lenoir; Sébastien Thibaudeau	23 May 2021	24 June 2021	404	0.52
Now aware of Marinette's secret, Alya helps her with Ladybug's duties. Later, Marinette brings Kagami to the shooting of a commercial with Adrien, in an attempt to console her. They accidentally crash it, making Mr. Ramier, who provided pigeons for special effects, turn into Mr. Pigeon for the 72nd time, with the power to turn people into pigeons. With Adrien transformed into a bird, Ladybug enlists the help of Plagg and Rena Rouge to defeat Mr. Pigeon. After his defeat, Ladybug gives Mr. Ramier a "Magical Charm" to protect him from future akumatizations.
83	5	"Furious Fu" "Fu Furieux"	Thomas Astruc; Wilfried Pain; Jun Violet; Cyril Adam; Nicolas Hess	Thomas Astruc; Mélanie Duval; Fred Lenoir; Sébastien Thibaudeau	30 May 2021	25 June 2021	406	0.48
After meeting with Master Fu, Marinette is confronted by Su-Han, a "Celestial Guardian" of the Miraculouses who does not believe she can be a Guardian or protect Paris. When Cat Noir refuses to relinquish his Miraculous on Su-Han's orders, the heroes attack Su-Han and retrieve the Miracle Box back from him. Su-Han steals Master Fu's cane in order to pursue the heroes, and the confrontation agitates Fu enough to become "Furious Fu", who can bring Chinese characters to life. Ladybug and Cat Noir defeat Furious Fu, impressing Su-Han enough for him to allow Marinette to continue being Ladybug.: This episode premiered in Brazil on Gloob on 23 March 2021.; The English version of this episode was first shown in Spain on Disney Channel on 29 May 2021.
84	6	"Sole Crusher" "Pirkell"	Thomas Astruc; Wilfried Pain; Jun Violet; Cyril Adam; Nicolas Hess	Thomas Astruc; Mélanie Duval; Fred Lenoir; Sébastien Thibaudeau	6 June 2021	26 June 2021	407	0.38
Chloé's half-sister, Zoé Lee, comes to Paris from New York to visit her family. She quickly makes friends with Marinette, but forgoes her usual kind nature to fit in with her mean-spirited family. Disappointed that she cannot show her true self, she is akumatized into "Sole Crusher", who can grow bigger by stepping on people, who are absorbed into her shoes. During her rampage, Marinette tries to reason with the akumatized Zoé, and tells her that she will always be there for her no matter what. After her defeat, Zoé chooses to be herself.: This episode premiered in Brazil on Gloob on 25 May 2021.
85	7	"Queen Banana"	Thomas Astruc; Wilfried Pain; Jun Violet; Cyril Adam; Nicolas Hess	Thomas Astruc; Mélanie Duval; Fred Lenoir; Sébastien Thibaudeau	13 June 2021	3 July 2021	408	0.27
Marinette's class films a superhero movie, with Zoé in the leading role. Chloé, jealous of her half-sister's casting, forces herself into Zoé's role, demanding numerous rewrites to make the film her personal fantasy. When the class refuses to comply, she is akumatized into "Queen Banana", with a car and a gorilla sentimonster named "Banana Boom-Boom", all of which can turn people into bananas. To help defeat her, Ladybug gives Zoé the Bee Miraculous, turning her into "Vesperia". After Queen Banana's defeat, Shadow Moth tries to akumatize Chloé again, but the Magical Charm counteracts the akuma.: Guest star: Thomas Astruc as himself in the French version.; This episode premiered in Germany on Disney Channel on 28 May 2021.; The English version of this episode was first aired in Spain on Disney Channel on 30 May 2021.
86	8	"Guiltrip" "Culpabysse"	Thomas Astruc; Wilfried Pain; Jun Violet; Cyril Adam; Nicolas Hess	Thomas Astruc; Mélanie Duval; Fred Lenoir; Sébastien Thibaudeau	20 June 2021	10 July 2021	411	0.39
Rose disappears in the middle of class, making a disheartened Juleka reveal she is suffering from a secret chronic illness. When Rose returns, everyone gives her special treatment, despite wanting to be treated normally. Feeling guilty, Juleka is turned back into Reflekta, with a sentimonster, "Guiltrip", who can force people to wallow in guilt and become copies of Reflekta. To defeat her, Ladybug gives Rose the Pig Miraculous, transforming her into "Pigella", whose Gift can show a target their heart's greatest desire.: This episode premiered in Brazil on Gloob on 4 May 2021.; The English version of this episode was first shown in Spain on Disney Channel on 5 June 2021.
87	9	"Crocoduel"	Thomas Astruc; Wilfried Pain; Jun Violet; Cyril Adam; Nicolas Hess	Thomas Astruc; Mélanie Duval; Fred Lenoir; Sébastien Thibaudeau	29 August 2021	30 October 2021	412	0.33
Marinette continues to ignore Luka after their breakup, prompting their friends to bring them together at his and Juleka's birthday party. There, Luka and Juleka become targets for an akuma, until their friends comfort them. A visiting Jagged Stone gets into an argument with Anarka, making the akuma transform them back into Guitar Villain and Captain Hardrock as "Crocoduel". They continue their fight in the sky; to defeat them, Ladybug recruits Juleka with the Tiger Miraculous, transforming her into "Purple Tigress", whose power is a powerful "Clout". Once the villains are defeated, Marinette and Luka reconcile as friends.: This episode premiered in Brazil on Gloob on 3 August 2021.; The English version of this episode was first shown on Disney Channel Southeast Asia on 17 September 2021.
88	10	"Optigami"	Thomas Astruc; Wilfried Pain; Jun Violet; Cyril Adam; Nicolas Hess	Thomas Astruc; Mélanie Duval; Fred Lenoir; Sébastien Thibaudeau	5 September 2021	17 July 2021	413	0.38
To lure out the temporary Miraculous holders, Gabriel invites them to a staged award ceremony, where he turns Audrey back into Style Queen and has her eliminate most of them. Marinette and Adrien end up stuck in an elevator, unable to transform. The former calls Kaalki to bring Alya to Marinette's house, where she transforms into Rena Rouge. She brings the Turtle Miraculous to Nino (who has secretly been replaced by a sentimonster copy) and the Bee Miraculous to Marinette, who turns into "Ladybee". With help from Rena Rouge and the sentimonster Carapace, she defeats Style Queen. Realizing the deception, Ladybug has Cat Noir expose "Optigami", the sentimonster which Gabriel and Nathalie used to spy on the heroes. Later, Marinette permanently entrusts Alya with the Fox Miraculous.: This episode premiered in Germany on Disney Channel on 30 May 2021.
89	11	"Sentibubbler" "Sentibulleur"	Thomas Astruc; Wilfried Pain; Jun Violet; Cyril Adam; Nicolas Hess	Thomas Astruc; Mélanie Duval; Fred Lenoir; Sébastien Thibaudeau	12 September 2021	24 July 2021	414	0.37
Marinette has a nightmare where Shadow Moth claims the Miracle Box through Alya. To prevent this, she tells Alya how dangerous it is to have one's secret identity known. During the talk, Shadow Moth captures Alya's loved ones using "Sentibubbler", a sentimonster copy of the Bubbler. He demands that Alya betray Ladybug and give him the Fox Miraculous, or the hostages will be sent to space. Instead, Alya secretly transforms into Rena Rouge and uses several illusions to fool him, also allowing Marinette to use the Horse Miraculous to become "Pegabug". She briefly takes control of Sentibubbler and frees his prisoners, before he is dispelled. Shadow Moth now believes that Rena Rouge will never be active again, reassuring Marinette that the nightmare will never happen.: This episode premiered in Brazil on Gloob on 6 July 2021.
90	12	"Rocketear" "Larme Ultime"	Thomas Astruc; Wilfried Pain; Jun Violet; Cyril Adam; Nicolas Hess	Thomas Astruc; Mélanie Duval; Fred Lenoir; Sébastien Thibaudeau	19 September 2021	31 July 2021	417	0.34
Alya becomes a hidden protector hero named "Rena Furtive" whose existence she, under orders from Ladybug, cannot disclose to anyone, even Nino. This, along with a series of coincidences, makes him believe Alya is leaving him for Cat Noir. His suspicions are seemingly confirmed when he records Alya and Cat Noir together. He tells this to Adrien, revealing his and Alya's secret identities in the process. He becomes emotional and turns into "Rocketear", who can throw exploding tears from his eyes. With help from Rena Furtive, Ladybug reveals the truth – Cat Noir was actually making sure Alya is not in love with him. Nino rejects his akumatization, and later, Alya tells him about being Rena Furtive.: This episode premiered in Brazil on Gloob on 13 July 2021.; The French version of this episode was first shown in the United States on Disney+ on 15 September 2021.
91	13	"Mega Leech" "Sangsure"	Thomas Astruc; Wilfried Pain; Jun Violet; Cyril Adam; Nicolas Hess	Thomas Astruc; Mélanie Duval; Fred Lenoir; Sébastien Thibaudeau	26 September 2021	14 August 2021	410	0.39
Mayor Bourgeois unveils a project that claims to improve air quality but will actually cut down multiple trees. Led by Mylène and Ivan, the Parisians protest against this. Humiliated, the Mayor is akumatized back into Malediktator, and his sentimonster "Mega Leech" splits him into thousands of tiny clones that enter people's brains and control them. To defeat them all, Ladybug recruits Vesperia, Carapace, Ryuko, and Pegasus, and gives Mylène the Mouse Miraculous, transforming her into "Polymouse". At the end, Gabriel seems to mysteriously controlling Adrien into obeying him by twisting Emilie's ring.: This episode premiered in Brazil on Gloob on 20 July 2021.; The French version of this episode was first shown in the United States on Disney+ on 15 September 2021.
92	14	"Wishmaker" "Exauceur"	Thomas Astruc; Wilfried Pain; Jun Violet; Cyril Adam; Nicolas Hess	Thomas Astruc; Mélanie Duval; Fred Lenoir; Sébastien Thibaudeau	3 October 2021	7 August 2021	418	0.32
Marinette and Adrien visit a career expo, unsure of what they'll do in the future. While hosting a show mocking people's careers, Alec Cataldi realizes he has wasted his life and dreams. He is akumatized into "Wishmaker", who turns people into living versions of their childhood dreams. Ladybug recruits Viperion for the battle, where Ladybug and Cat Noir's identities are exposed. Viperion erases these moments and keeps the knowledge of the identities to himself. Later, Alec becomes more expressive, dressing in drag and now inspiring others.: The French version of this episode was first shown in the United States on Disney+ on 15 September 2021.
93	15	"Hack-San"	Thomas Astruc; Wilfried Pain; Jun Violet; Cyril Adam; Nicolas Hess	Thomas Astruc; Mélanie Duval; Fred Lenoir; Sébastien Thibaudeau	10 October 2021	13 November 2021	416	0.32
Marinette and her parents leave for London to visit her aunt Shu Yin. To ensure Paris is protected, she gives Alya her Miraculous. Shadow Moth creates a sentimonster, "Hack-San", to give Markov a computer virus and allowing him to be re-akumatized into Robostus, now with the ability to brainwash people into giving up their most prized possession. Alya transforms into "Scarabella" and defeats Robostus with the help of Cat Noir and Marinette. Later, Ladybug returns; Cat Noir confesses that he feared he will never see Ladybug again, but she assures him otherwise.: Cameo: Josiane Balasko as Sarah and Philippe Candeloro as Philippe.; This episode premiered in Brazil on Gloob on 14 September 2021.; The French version of this episode was first shown in Switzerland on RTS Un on 9 October 2021.
94	16	"Simpleman" "Simplificator"	Thomas Astruc; Wilfried Pain; Jun Violet; Cyril Adam; Nicolas Hess	Thomas Astruc; Mélanie Duval; Fred Lenoir; Sébastien Thibaudeau	17 October 2021	16 October 2021	419	0.38
Marinette has to babysit Manon, Ella, Etta, and Chris, but they keep causing mischief. Adrien asks her for help with a photoshoot, so she brings the kids to Rolland's house. However, he is overwhelmed by the kids' modern ways, causing him to be akumatized into "Simpleman", who can make people think and act like children. The kids, unaffected by his power, help the heroes defeat him.: This episode premiered in Brazil on Gloob on 28 September 2021.; The French version of this episode was first shown in Switzerland on RTS Un on 16 October 2021.
95	17	"Glaciator 2"	Thomas Astruc; Wilfried Pain; Jun Violet; Cyril Adam; Nicolas Hess	Thomas Astruc; Mélanie Duval; Fred Lenoir; Sébastien Thibaudeau	24 October 2021	6 November 2021	415	0.40
Ladybug and Cat Noir fight Glaciator, learning they have been voted "Couple of the Year". This bothers Ladybug, so Cat Noir tones down his usual flirtiness, but quickly becomes depressed. Marinette decides to practice confessing to Cat Noir, and the two bond over their inability to be straightforward. Believing that Cat Noir is meant to be with Ladybug, André is turned back into Glaciator. Ladybug and Cat Noir defeat him together, and after that, Marinette confesses her true thoughts.
96	18	"Dearest Family" "Chère Famille"	Thomas Astruc; Wilfried Pain; Jun Violet; Cyril Adam; Nicolas Hess	Thomas Astruc; Mélanie Duval; Fred Lenoir; Sébastien Thibaudeau	31 October 2021	23 October 2021	421	0.35
It is Three Kings Day and Tikki finds herself addicted to the galettes des rois Tom, Rolland, and Marinette's mother, Sabine, bake. Gina visits, and the family quickly falls into an argument. Shadow Moth creates a "megakuma" that breaks through Magical Charms and uses it to turn Tom, Gina, and Rolland into Weredad, Befana, and Bakerix, with Sabine becoming "Qilin", joining forces as "Dearest Family". Ladybug tries to fight them, but Tikki's hunger forces her to detransform. Tikki eats every galette she sees, then creates a giant floating one, which Cat Noir destroys. Marinette helps Tikki control herself, then defeats Dearest Family with Cat Noir's help. Later, Gabriel reveals he will use the Miraculouses to create a world where he and Emilie are together.: This episode premiered in Brazil on Gloob on 19 October 2021.
97	19	"Ephemeral" "Éphémère"	Thomas Astruc; Wilfried Pain; Jun Violet; Cyril Adam; Nicolas Hess	Thomas Astruc; Mélanie Duval; Fred Lenoir; Sébastien Thibaudeau	7 November 2021	27 November 2021	422	0.39
Due to Cat Noir missing, Ladybug calls upon multiple allies to defeat a villain. Noticing this, Su-Han asks her to find out his identity. Ladybug has Cat Noir reveal himself, then plans to have Viperion erase that moment. However, Ladybug falters when Cat Noir reveals himself as Adrien, causing them to run out of time. The two enter a relationship and soon Marinette reveals herself as well. Gabriel deduces Adrien's identity, revealing himself and taking his Miraculous before turning his son into "Ephemeral", with the power to speed up time. Shadow Moth, as "Shadow Noir", soon claims the Ladybug Miraculous, but Luka has Sass revert time, preventing everything that happened after the identity reveal. However, it also creates several temporal anomalies, which Ladybug and Cat Noir fix by using their space powerups to recalibrate a timing satellite. Later, Ladybug makes peace with Su-Han.
98	20	"Gabriel Agreste"	Thomas Astruc; Wilfried Pain; Jun Violet; Cyril Adam; Nicolas Hess	Thomas Astruc; Mélanie Duval; Fred Lenoir; Sébastien Thibaudeau	14 November 2021	20 November 2021	409	0.26
To help Marinette get into a party hosted by Gabriel, her friends have her enter in disguise. Amelie and Félix arrive, and both Félix and Gabriel plot to steal back the other party's ring. Félix gives Gabriel a fake ring, keeping the real one, and learns Shadow Moth's identity. Angered, he creates a sentimonster copy of Gabriel in order to akumatize Félix, but soon akumatizes his sentimonster into a copy of the Collector upon Félix's rejection of the akuma. After destroying the sentimonster, receiving a Magic Charm, Gabriel plants fake Miraculouses should Félix make a return visit.
99	21	"Psycomedian" "Psycomédien"	Thomas Astruc; Wilfried Pain; Jun Violet; Cyril Adam; Nicolas Hess	Thomas Astruc; Mélanie Duval; Fred Lenoir; Sébastien Thibaudeau	13 February 2022	5 February 2022	405	0.25
Marinette asks Harry Clown, a famous comedian, to help her talk to Adrien, but Harry's plan fails. At the same time, Bob Roth rejects one of Harry's scripts. Disappointed, he is akumatized into "Psycomedian", who can force people to feel particular emotions. His power effects Ladybug and Cat Noir is forced to take the lead.: Guest star: Franck Dubosc as Harry Clown / Psycomedian in the French version. The character is based on himself.; This episode premiered in Switzerland on RTS Un on 29 January 2022.
100	22	"Kuro Neko"	Thomas Astruc; Wilfried Pain; Jun Violet; Cyril Adam; Nicolas Hess	Thomas Astruc; Mélanie Duval; Fred Lenoir; Sébastien Thibaudeau	20 February 2022	19 February 2022	423	0.31
Ladybug continues to prioritize temporary heroes over Cat Noir, which breaks his heart. When Ladybug claims he's wasting her time, he renounces his Miraculous. Plagg tricks Marinette into letting him choose a new Cat Noir; he instead returns to Adrien. Believing that being Cat Noir will make Ladybug reject him, he assumes a second secret identity called "Cat Walker". After exchanging introductions, Ladybug and Cat Walker try to defeat a cat sentimonster called "Kuro Neko", while Ladybug must fight her guilt of causing Cat Noir to leave and her rising affections for Cat Walker. Later, Adrien becomes Cat Noir again and Ladybug reaffirms he's irreplaceable.: In this episode, a character appears based on a real person named Rythm, who was invited by ZAG in June 2019 as part of a collaboration with the Make-A-Wish Foundation to make her wish.; This episode premiered in Brazil on Gloob on 24 January 2022.
101	23	"Penalteam"	Thomas Astruc; Wilfried Pain; Jun Violet; Cyril Adam; Nicolas Hess	Thomas Astruc; Mélanie Duval; Fred Lenoir; Sébastien Thibaudeau	27 February 2022	26 February 2022	424	0.30
Marinette's class plays a soccer game, but Chloé is not interested. When she is not allowed to leave, Chloé allows herself to be akumatized into "Penalty". With her clones, the "Penalteam", she forces the class into a city-wide soccer game they can control. Ladybug recruits all the other heroes, as well as Sabrina, Marc, Nathaniel, and Ivan with the Dog, Rooster, Goat, and Ox Miraculouses, as "Miss Hound", "Rooster Bold", "Caprikid", and "Minotaurox". After failing the first round, the heroes work as a team for the next two rounds, humiliating Chloé enough for her to de-akumatize herself. Later, Chloé is allowed to leave the game, and forms an alliance with Lila.: Guest star: Didier Roustan as himself in the French version.; This episode premiered in Brazil on Gloob on 14 February 2022.
102	24	"Qilin"	Thomas Astruc; Wilfried Pain; Jun Violet; Cyril Adam; Nicolas Hess	Thomas Astruc; Mélanie Duval; Fred Lenoir; Sébastien Thibaudeau	6 March 2022	12 February 2022	420	0.30
As a late Mother's Day gift, Marinette decides to buy her mother flowers. When the two are on the bus, Marinette takes her mother's wallet, as she does not have money on her. Without a ticket, Sabine is fined by a racist ticket inspector, and is soon arrested. She is akumatized into Qilin, using her telekinensis and aerokinensis blows away several police officers as they keep returning in larger numbers. Ladybug convinces her mother to de-akumatize herself, then as Marinette offers to pay for the fine herself.
103	25	"Risk (Shadow Moth's Final Attack – Part 1)" "Risque (La Dernière Attaque de Papillombre – Partie 1)"	Thomas Astruc; Wilfried Pain; Jun Violet; Cyril Adam; Nicolas Hess	Thomas Astruc; Mélanie Duval; Fred Lenoir; Sébastien Thibaudeau	13 March 2022	5 March 2022	425	0.26
Realizing that Ladybug never risks making a mistake, Gabriel akumatizes Froggy, a young kid, into "Risk", who makes all those who hear his song more reckless. Influenced by his power, Adrien and Marinette try to prevent the former from going on a world tour with Lila. Félix offers to stand in for Adrien, secretly discovering Gabriel's fake Miraculouses and Emilie's coffin. Adrien realizes he should break free from his father's control, but he and Ladybug are too late. Despite their efforts, the disguised Félix leaves with Lila. Shadow Moth then creates a sentimonster, "Strikeback", to put his plan into motion.
104	26	"Strikeback (Shadow Moth's Final Attack – Part 2)" "Réplique (La Dernière Attaque de Papillombre – Partie 2)"	Thomas Astruc; Wilfried Pain; Jun Violet; Cyril Adam; Nicolas Hess	Thomas Astruc; Mélanie Duval; Fred Lenoir; Sébastien Thibaudeau	13 March 2022	12 March 2022	426	0.24
While battling Strikeback, Ladybug and Cat Noir get into an argument, with Cat Noir believing he is not important to her. Ladybug ignores his complaints and recruits a number of heroes to fight Strikeback, but it copies their powers. Upon discovering Risk's effects, Ladybug uses the Horse and Rabbit Miraculouses to become "Pennybug". She teleports to Félix, believing him to be Adrien, and gives him the Dog Miraculous to become "Flairmidable". Together, they go back in time to see how Risk was akumatized so they can de-akumatize him in the present. After he and Strikeback are defeated, Alya returns the Fox Miraculous, as she was accidentally exposed as Rena Furtive. Flairmidable approaches Gabriel and ropes him into a blackmail-type deal where he uses his "Fetch" power to retrieve Ladybug's yoyo, trading all the Miraculouses inside as well as the ring he stole for the Peacock Miraculous. Gabriel announces his victory, which leaves Ladybug in tears. Cat Noir forgives and comforts her, along with the rest of Paris.: This episode premiered in Brazil on Gloob on 10 March 2022.
