= Miraculous: Tales of Ladybug & Cat Noir season 6 =

French animated television series

Miraculous: Tales of Ladybug & Cat Noir
- Season 6
- Promotional poster
- No. of episodes: 26

Release
- Original release: March 23, 2025 – October 11, 2026

Season chronology
- ← Previous; Season 5 Next → Season 7

The sixth season of the French animated television series Miraculous: Tales of Ladybug & Cat Noir premiered on TFOU on 23 March 2025. It consists of 26 episodes.

After the death of Monarch, a new villain known as Chrysalis has taken the Butterfly Miraculous. Marinette Dupain-Cheng and Adrien Agreste, as Ladybug and Cat Noir, fight against the akumatized villains created by Chrysalis alongside their superhero team, the Miraculers.

== Episodes ==
No. overall	No. in season	English title French title	Directed by	Written by	Original air date (France)	U.S. air date	Prod. code	U.S. viewers (millions)
132	1	"The Illustrhater" "Dessinatriste"	Thomas Astruc; Wilfried Pain	Thomas Astruc; Sébastien Thibaudeau; Caroline Torelli	23 March 2025	25 January 2025	602	0.21
Marinette and Adrien plan their first official date, which Alya and Nino briefly join in. She tries going to the movies and a café, but since she is new to dating, she does not know how to act with or around Adrien, instead trying to mimic what the other couples around her are doing. She gets so anxious that she transforms into Ladybug to help the other heroes, who have started going on patrol without her leadership, even if said heroes do not need assistance. The date is postponed when Maya, a young artistic girl, is akumatized into "The Illustrhater," being able to draw any object into existence. Ladybug, Cat Noir, Rena Rouge, and Carapace all work together to take down the villain, after which Marinette finally expresses her fears to Adrien. As a precaution, Marinette gives a Ladybug kwagatama to Alya, so that she can access Ladybug's memories should anything happen to her.: This episode premiered on Gloob on 24 January 2025.
133	2	"Sublimation"	Thomas Astruc; Wilfried Pain	Thomas Astruc; Jean-Rémi Perrin; Sébastien Thibaudeau	23 March 2025	1 February 2025	603	0.17
Marinette notices Adrien has a new friend, Sublime Varlette, who is a talented musician and para-athlete. Marinette wants to catch Sublime's attention and make friends with her, but she does so in over-the-top ways that culminate in her breaking Sublime's prosthetic leg on the day of a race tryout. This causes Sublime's mother, Caroline, to be akumatized into "Sublimation", who can make anyone into the best version of themselves. After a short battle, the Lucky Charm causes Ladybug to realize that she caused everything, so she apologizes to Sublime both as Ladybug and Marinette while advising them not to take Bob Roth as a sponsor. Later, Marinette becomes true friends with Sublime. In the final scene, Sublime's family go to Tomoe Tsurugi to sponsor her. She accepts the sponsorship while secretly having a plan of her own.: This episode premiered on Gloob on 31 January 2025.
134	3	"Werepapas" "Papys Garous"	Thomas Astruc; Wilfried Pain	Thomas Astruc; Sébastien Thibaudeau	26 March 2025	15 February 2025	605	0.15
Adrien meets with his grandparents – Emilie's parents Lord Emil and Lady Milly Graham de Vanily of Westchestermunster, and Gabriel's parents, the hippies Johnny and Gabrielle Grasette. As he is understandably nervous, Marinette joins their meeting as a maid. She witnesses how Emilie's parents want Adrien to go to England and live a noble life, while Gabriel's parents prefer a more relaxed life. Due to shenanigans involving Marinette and Plagg, the meeting escalates rapidly, culminating in Lady Milly being akumatized into "Ringmaster", who turns Emil and Johnny into the boxing werewolf duo called the "Werepapas" and forces them to fight for Adrien's custody, Adrien being held captive in a lifesized trophy. He cannot transform into Cat Noir (as doing so would risk his identity), so Ladybug has to single-handedly defeat them. When everything is cleared and back to normal, Marinette suggests that Adrien should live his own life in Paris with Nathalie, whom he already treats as his mother.: This episode premiered on Gloob on 7 February 2025.; This episode aired in France on TFOU on 30 March 2025.
135	4	"Daddycop"	Thomas Astruc; Wilfried Pain	Thomas Astruc; Pierre Doublier; Sébastien Thibaudeau	2 April 2025	8 February 2025	604	0.19
Marinette plans an extravagant celebration for her one hundredth kiss with Adrien, forgetting that it falls on the same day as a movie night with her friends. Things get more complicated when Zoé invites Sabrina, who is having self-esteem issues, to the movie night, with Marinette agreeing to it thinking she was agreeing to inviting Adrien. When Sabrina shows up, Marinette gets disappointed, making Sabrina almost akumatized. The akuma is instead redirected to Roger Raincomprix, who becomes "Daddycop", a variant of Rogercop who can force people to love Sabrina. Ladybug assures Sabrina that she is a good person after the latter tries to relinquish her Miraculous. As a result, she gains a new Miss Hound suit when she transforms and joins the fight. Together with Pegasus, the heroes take down Daddycop. Marinette later formally invites Sabrina to the group, learning that in the midst of her blossoming relationship with Adrien, she has to allow herself to spend time with her own friends outside of their relationship. In the final scene, Zoé is confronted by a boy named Ray, an old acquaintance from school and bully of hers who threatens to expose her secret of how she really was in New York to everyone.: This episode aired in France on TFOU on 6 April 2025.
136	5	"Revelator"	Thomas Astruc; Wilfried Pain	Thomas Astruc; Sébastien Thibaudeau; Caroline Torelli	9 April 2025	19 April 2025	611	0.16
The superheroes, now nicknamed as the "Miraculers", train themselves to never lose their powers. Marinette and Adrien find out that their relationship is being publicly tarnished by Vincent Aza who is now a social media influencer under the name "Vincent Secret". Marinette and Adrien appear on his podcast to clarify things, only for him to edit the video to make them look horrible. Rena Rouge confronts him disguised as a fan, and he reveals that he is not telling the whole truth and deliberately exaggerating stories to get more views. Alya exposes him, making him akumatized into "Revelator", a variant of Pixelator that can reveal people's secrets to anyone. During the battle, Rena Rouge finds out that Marinette did not tell Adrien that his father's secret identity was really Monarch, making her angry at Marinette. While the Miraculous Ladybug does not erase her memory of it, Cat Noir upgrades his power into a "Miraculous Cat Noir" that can destroy memories. In the final scene, Alya wonders why she was angry at Marinette and knows she's carrying a heavy burden resolving to help her any way she can.: This episode premiered on Gloob on 21 March 2025.; This episode aired in France on TFOU on 13 April 2025.
137	6	"Climatiqueen"	Thomas Astruc; Wilfried Pain	Thomas Astruc; Sébastien Thibaudeau	16 April 2025	26 April 2025	601	0.18
Adrien has no idea what to do with his life after his father's death. To remedy this, Marinette tries helping him find his passion, but none of her suggestions stick with him. Meanwhile, Aurora Beauréal joins an online contest on Zoo, a social media app with sub-communities themed after various animals, to win a book on meteorology, but she loses despite her genuine passion and deliberate inauthentic attempts at securing the top spot. She is akumatized into "Climatiqueen", an upgraded version of Stormy Weather who now can brainwash people with lightning. After her defeat with the help of Pegasus, Aurore and Adrien realize the true meaning of passion with Aurore joining a more supportive Zoo community and Adrien giving himself time to decide.: Note: This episode chronologically takes place before the events of "Sublimation."; This episode aired in France on TFOU on 20 April 2025.
138	7	"El Toro de Piedra"	Thomas Astruc; Wilfried Pain	Thomas Astruc; Sébastien Thibaudeau; Caroline Torelli	23 April 2025	7 June 2025	607	0.14
Marinette and her class plan a concert to thank Mayor Bustier. While rehearsing, Marinette and Adrien go through the latter's old things where Marinette finds a letter from Gabriel explaining his true identity. She shows it to Nathalie, but she does not tell Adrien. Meanwhile, Ivan feels distant from his father Raúl "El Toro" Bruel, who is a notorious criminal despite undergoing rehab. When Ivan refuses to participate in a heist, Raúl is akumatized into the bull-themed "El Toro de Piedra" (which is Spanish for "The Stone Bull"), whose whip has the power to turn people into stone bulls. Ladybug and Cat Noir enlist Ivan as Minotaurox to help defeat El Toro de Piedra, who promises to reform. The concert is successfully saved by Juleka (who performs solo due to several mishaps). In the final scene, Nathalie reports to "The Kingdom", a secret society that also includes her father Mr. Sancoeur, who wish to claim Ladybug and Cat Noir's Miraculouses to complete the Perfect World Project. An operative known as "The Machine" takes Nathalie in as her "Shadow" and plans to finish the job that Gabriel started.: This episode aired in France on TFOU on 27 April 2025.
139	8	"The Ruler" "La Redresseuse"	Thomas Astruc; Wilfried Pain	Thomas Astruc; Pierre Doublier; Sébastien Thibaudeau	30 April 2025	14 June 2025	615	0.17
Nathaniel illustrates a romance fantasy comic written by Marc, but he doubts it will catch on, especially since his architect mother Shirel wants him to take up more "serious" arts like architecture. Despite encouragement from Marc, Marinette (who is sick with the common cold) and her friends, Shirel finds out about his comic and forces him to quit and pulls him out of school. Shirel is akumatized into "The Ruler", a Templar Knight-themed villain whose scale ruler can brand people and force its holder to do exactly as they say. With help from Caprikid, Ladybug and Cat Noir (who get brainwashed) defeat the villain. Ladybug helps Shirel see the error of her ways. In the final scene, Nathaniel and Marc reveal themselves as Caprikid and Rooster Bold to each other.: This episode aired in France on TFOU on 4 May 2025.
140	9	"Mister Agreste" "Monsieur Agreste"	Thomas Astruc; Wilfried Pain	Thomas Astruc; Pierre Doublier; Sébastien Thibaudeau	24 September 2025	27 September 2025	609	0.19
Marinette continues to regret lying to Adrien and the world about Gabriel's secret identity as Monarch following her latest nightmare, but Nathalie forces her to stick to their agreement to portray Gabriel as a hero. A flashback scene reveals that Luka still has feelings for Marinette and went to Brazil partly to avoid his jealousy over her relationship with Adrien; to hide his feelings, he has a Brazilian girl named Irupé pose as his girlfriend. When Marinette cannot take the secrecy about Gabriel anymore, she goes to Brazil, borrows the Snake Miraculous from Luka, confesses her lie to him, and then uses the Miraculous to undo the confession to prevent things from getting worse. Meanwhile, Théo Barbot proposes to build a statue of Gabriel in Paris, but Adrien rejects it; he cannot reconcile Gabriel's reputation as a hero with his abusive treatment of his son. Théo is akumatized into "Mister Agreste," a giant clay version of his statue; he is defeated by Adrien telling him the truth of what Gabriel was like as a father. After his defeat, Marinette decides it is probably best if she keeps up her lie. In the final scene, Irupé is revealed to be the owner of a kwami-like creature named Maino'li.: This episode premiered in Brazil on Gloob in English on 23 September 2025.
141	10	"Sleeping Syren" "Princesse Syren"	Thomas Astruc; Wilfried Pain	Camélia Acef; Thomas Astruc; Sébastien Thibaudeau	1 October 2025	4 October 2025	606	0.17
Marinette and her friends try to cheer up Ondine, who has not had a kiss with Kim yet despite having feelings for him. They try setting up some Marinette-style shenanigans to get them together, but they are constantly thwarted by Kim, who acts rudely due to the influence of Ray and his fellow bullies Loïc and Nelson. This culminates in Ondine being akumatized into "Sleeping Syren", a sleeping variant of Syren who has aquatic knights that can turn people into toads. Ladybug calls on all of her teammates to help with the exception of King Monkey. Ladybug tries to revoke his Miraculous, but decides against it when she learns Kim was genuinely deceived and not truly malicious. After Kim is told by Ladybug not to give into gullibility upon learning about what Nelson told him, King Monkey helps to defeat the villain. Later, Kim and Ondine share mundane but heartfelt kisses. In the final scene, Ray, Loïc, and Nelson are confronted by a shadowy figure who is not happy with what they did.
142	11	"Wreckless Driver" "Psyconductrice"	Thomas Astruc; Wilfried Pain	Camélia Acef; Thomas Astruc; Sébastien Thibaudeau	8 October 2025	15 November 2025	612	0.16
Marinette and her friends help their classmate Aglaé get over her debilitating phobia of insects by taking her to Dr. Psiquat, a psychotherapist who had previously helped Mylène with her fears and Max with his autism spectrum disorder. Aglaé confesses that she has been scared of akumatization and butterflies in general since she was hit by Timebreaker long in the past, and later akumatized into "Lady Butterfly" when Ray and his friends locked her in in a butterfly sanctuary. But when Aglaé realizes therapy takes time, she gets frustrated and storms out. Dr. Psiquat's ensuing self-doubt gets her akumatized into "Wreckless Driver" who drives a car with equipment that can remove people's fears instantly, making them careless. With help from Pegasus, Polymouse, and Purple Tigress Ladybug and Cat Noir defeat the villain, though Adrien is almost forced to reveal his secret identity. In the final scene, Aglaé takes the first step against her fears and Adrien starts seeing Dr. Psiquat to process his relationship with his father.
143	12	"The Dark Castle" "Le Château Noir"	Thomas Astruc; Wilfried Pain	Thomas Astruc; Manuel Meyre; Sébastien Thibaudeau	15 October 2025	11 October 2025	610	0.18
It is almost Alix's birthday, so Marinette decides to temporarily relieve Alix from her duty as Bunnyx to allow her to have a birthday party in the present. Marinette holds the Rabbit Miraculous, fusing with it to be "Bunnybug", and watches the party from the Burrow. Marinette uses the Rabbit's time travel powers to subtly prevent several mishaps during the party, but when one of her interventions accidentally results in the destruction of the world, she reverses it and stops meddling. Meanwhile, Armand d'Argencourt has been campaigning to demolish the Louvre Pyramid and convert the museum back into a castle in a bid to restore the French monarchy. He is akumatized into "The Dark Castle", turning the building itself into a gigantic anthropomorphic castle surrounded by knights. Marinette lends the Rabbit Miraculous to her future self to monitor the Burrow while she defeats the villain as Ladybug, aided only by Cat Noir in order to allow the rest of her friends to enjoy Alix's party. Later, Marinette offers to keep the Rabbit Miraculous in order to allow Alix to live a normal life, but Alix insists on remaining Bunnyx. In the final scene, the present Ladybug is enlisted by her past counterpart and returns after the mission is done.: This episode premiered on Gloob on 10 October 2025.
144	13	"Yaksi Gozen"	Thomas Astruc; Wilfried Pain	Thomas Astruc; Wilfried Pain; Sébastien Thibaudeau	22 October 2025	22 November 2025	613	0.21
Adrien wants to match Marinette's skill at over-the-top declarations of love, but he could not seem to get it right. Meanwhile, Kagami wants to break free from Tomoe after the latter continued to control her despite promising to reform to Ladybug. A flashback reveals that Tomoe created Kagami as a sentimonster with the intention of giving her a perfect boyfriend due to Tomoe's distrust of men at the cost of her eyes, which were replaced by bionics. Lila visits Tomoe in person to akumatize her into "Yaksi Gozen", a variant of Ikari Gozen who can paralyze people, planning to trap Félix to keep Kagami in order. However, before they can start, Kagami and Félix surrender their amoks to Ladybug, disrupting the plan. Tomoe feigns forgiveness and deakumatizes herself, while Kagami and Félix decide to keep their amoks instead. In the final scene, Tomoe connects with the same secretive organization Nathalie and Gabriel are a part of, as a new person fills Gabriel's position as "The Diamond".
145	14	"Noe" "Noé"	Thomas Astruc; Wilfried Pain	Thomas Astruc; Sébastien Thibaudeau; Caroline Torelli	29 October 2025	28 February 2026	616	N/A
The secret society watches Mylène's post and plans to take action. Just when everything seems to start going right for Marinette and her friends, a wealthy business executive named Noé Luxus appears and starts planting his influence. He attempts to buy Gabriel's brand from Adrien and tricks Fred Haprèle into starring in a movie that villainizes Ladybug and Cat Noir. Nathalie rejects his buyout while Mylène and Fred attempt to expose the film's script on Nadja's news show, but Nadja is fired when Noé becomes a shareholder at the TV station. Due to anger over contractual obligations preventing him from backing out of the film, Fred is reakumatized into the Mime. He attempts to go after Noé, but Ladybug, Cat Noir, Polymouse, and Minotaurox apprehend him and convince him to deakumatize and talk sense into Noé. Noé agrees to rewrite the film. A stinger scene reveals that he is Audrey Bourgeois' son as he tells her that now all of Paris knows who he is.
146	15	"Grendiaper" "Couchorak"	Thomas Astruc; Wilfried Pain	Thomas Astruc; Chloé Paye; Sébastien Thibaudeau	12 November 2025	7 March 2026	614	N/A
Zoé returns to school, having lived with André for the past year. However, the people around her, including Ray, Loïc, and Nelson, continue to act disrespectfully to others, which she does not like. That is why at night, she uses the Bee Miraculous to become Fury, a shadowy vigilante who delivers justice (the same one seen at the end of "Sleeping Syren"). However, things get worse when her actions get people in trouble, including getting a boy named Sam humiliated for being rude to his younger sister Sarah, with him getting akumatized into a villain named "Grendiaper" who pilots a baby-themed mech. Zoé ends up joining Ladybug, Cat Noir, and others as Vesperia to help defeat the villain. Cat Noir then reprimands Sam for his actions and advises him to start making amends. Later, Ladybug reminds Vesperia not to be too harsh on others. In the final scene, Zoé sees other people taking a non-harsh stand against arrogant people.
147	16	"Vampigami"	Thomas Astruc; Wilfried Pain	Thomas Astruc; Pierre Doublier; Sébastien Thibaudeau	19 November 2025	14 March 2026	608	N/A
Johnny and Gabrielle Grasette invite Marinette and Adrien to a vampire movie; Marinette agrees to go despite not liking horror films. Meanwhile, Rose's friend Prem wants to see the same movie. Ray, Loïc, and Nelson give Prem tickets for him and Rose in order to make Juleka jealous. Just before the movie begins, Luka phones Rose to tell her that Juleka is upset. This makes Prem feel guilty, which gets him akumatized into "Count Vampigami," who can create vampire minions that can turn others into vampires. Ladybug defeats him with the help of Cat Noir, Purple Tigress, and Pigella. Later, Marinette gives up her ticket so that Prem, Rose, and Juleka can watch the movie together and then quickly leaves. A stinger scene reveals that Lila is working with Tomoe, suspecting that Marinette really is Ladybug, and orchestrating the akumatization to try to prove it.
148	17	"A Fairy Good Night" "La Fée de Beaux Rêves"	Thomas Astruc; Wilfried Pain	Thomas Astruc; Manuel Meyre; Sébastien Thibaudeau	25 March 2026	21 March 2026	617	N/A
Claudie is going on a mission to the International Space Station which would place Max under the custody of the European Space Agency. Because Max's autism makes him stick to strict routines, he cannot easily adapt to the loneliness. Upon advice from Dr. Psiquat, he decides to stay over at Marinette's house for a night. At first, she tries to recreate Max's home life exactly, but she later loosens up, doubting whether her original overaccommodation would work. That night, her fears come to life, which is the result of "A Fairy Good Night", a villain made from an unnamed young girl that brings people's wishes to life in destructive ways. Ladybug, Cat Noir, and Pegasus travel to the moon to fight and defeat the villain, helping Max realize that adapting to change is possible and good. In the stinger scene, Chrysalis sends a letter to Max.: Notes: This episode first premiered in Switzerland on RTS 1 on 15 March 2026.
149	18	"Heartfixer" "Renverse-cœurs"	Thomas Astruc; Wilfried Pain	Thomas Astruc; Pierre Doublier; Sébastien Thibaudeau	1 April 2026	25 April 2026	620	N/A
In an attempt to break up Marinette and Adrien, Ray, Loïc, and Nelson channel an akumatization to become the "Couplewreckers" who can transform into anyone. They use their various disguises to trick Marinette, Adrien, Alya and Nino into breaking up. However, Adrien soon realizes the truth and transforms into Cat Noir just as Marinette is akumatized into "Heartfixer", who wants to repair her relationship. Despite Chrysalis prodding her about being Ladybug and Cat Noir detransforming in front of her, Marinette manages to break free of the akumatization due to her true love for Adrien. Afterwards, Marinette considers passing her role as guardian to Alya, but she and Tikki assure her that what happened wasn't her fault and that she is still worthy of her role. In a stinger scene, Marinette decides to hide the letter to Adrien in her yo-yo.
150	19	"Lady Chaos"	Thomas Astruc; Wilfried Pain	Thomas Astruc; Chloé Paye; Sébastien Thibaudeau	8 April 2026	28 March 2026	622	N/A
Adrien makes a documentary about Gabriel in the hopes on understanding him better. However, Marinette coaches the interviewees (Nathalie, Tomoe, and Amélie Graham de Vanily) to keep up her lie of a heroic Gabriel to Adrien. Later Amélie, who knows the true Gabriel and got lied to by a man, gets akumatized into "Lady Chaos", whose expanding dome around her makes people act chaotically. Ladybug, Cat Noir, Rena Rouge and Carapace defeat Lady Chaos. In a stinger scene, Amélie and Félix move to Paris, knowing that Adrien will need a lot of support when the truth about his father comes out.: Notes: This episode premiered on Gloob on 27 March 2026.
151	20	"Sadnansi" "Tristanansi"	Thomas Astruc; Wilfried Pain	Thomas Astruc; Sébastien Thibaudeau; Caroline Torelli	15 April 2026	18 April 2026	623	N/A
Marinette plans to tell Adrien about what really happened with Gabriel and that Ladybug will have to deal with the fallout. Some hours earlier, Marinette notices Nora Césaire, now a chef at the school, getting a little too close with fellow chef Twig. Despite Nora claiming she is not in love with him, Marinette sets up a game to help them confess. During the game, Twig admits that he has feelings for Nora, while she admits that she is in fact Alya's half-sister. Alya later confesses that she was hurt by her family hiding it from her, which inspires Marinette to finally help Adrien move on by creating a portrait of Gabriel. However, her attempts are interrupted when Nora is akumatized into "Sadnansi", a variant of Anansi who can stop people from loving and pass the lovelessness to others. Ladybug, Cat Noir, Rena Rouge, and Carapace defeat her by proving her love for Twig. Back in the present, Marinette almost tells Adrien about his father but instead breaks down. In a stinger scene, Rena Rouge is using her power of Mirage to re-create the final battle between Bug Noire and Monarch and try and figure out what Marinette is hiding.: Notes: This episode premiered in Switzerland on Play RTS on 12 April 2026.
152	21	"Riginarazione"	Thomas Astruc; Wilfried Pain	Thomas Astruc; Chloé Paye; Sébastien Thibaudeau	22 April 2026	25 April 2026	619	N/A
On his and Gina's 75th birthday, Roland struggles to tell Marinette that he sold his house in the wake of his weak heart. When he finally tells her, Marinette panics. The Dupain family celebrates their birthdays that same night, but Gina becomes heartbroken as Roland has a health scare during the celebration. She gets akumatized into "Riginarazione", a variant of Befana that can control people's ages; she de-ages Roland, ages Ladybug, and de-ages Cat Noir. Ladybug and Cat Noir defeat her despite being affected by her powers, and Roland assures Gina that he has no regrets about his life. Sometime later, Roland has died, his house is cleaned out, his pet mice are in Gina's custody, and the rest of his belongings are divided among Marinette's family and Adrien.
153	22	"The Chained Titans" "Les Titans Chaînés"	Thomas Astruc; Wilfried Pain	Thomas Astruc; Manuel Meyre; Sébastien Thibaudeau	29 April 2026	18 July 2026	621	N/A
Nino's parents Nordine and Vita will not stop fighting about their vacation plans, which leaves Nino stressed and worried. Later in the school cafeteria, Marinette and Adrien are discussing what to name to their hamster. Nino misinterprets their disagreement as a serious argument and fears they might end up breaking up like his parents. Worried about his friends and wanting them to understand the pressure he feels, Nino convinces Alya that Marinette and Adrien should temporarily become superheroes. They give their Miraculouses to Marinette and Adrien, who use the Fox and Turtle Miraculouses to become "Renardette" and "Trionyx", allowing them to share the secret and support Nino. Meanwhile, Nino's parents are akumatized into "The Chained Titans", giant Greek statues who are bound together by their unresolved conflict. Ladybug, Cat Noir, and Carapace force them into untying their chains, leading them to reconcile and eventually divorce. Afterward, Ladybug suggests Cat Noir get an understudy in the event he may not be available; he does not lean towards it.
154	23	"The Dirtifiers" "Les Crassetastrophes"	Thomas Astruc; Wilfried Pain	Camélia Acef; Thomas Astruc; Chloé Paye; Caroline Torelli; Sébastien Thibaudeau	27 September 2026	11 July 2026	618	N/A
On a sleepover, Kagami sees Marinette's parents being so caring and gets upset cause she doesn't have that kind of relationship with Tomoe. Tired of her mother's standards, she transforms into Ryuko and hides away in the clouds. Meanwhile, Ella and Etta learn their mother is pregnant with another child; their attempt to help decorate their room gets them akumatized into the "Dirtifers", who can teleport through puddles of ink they create. Ladybug, Cat Noir, and the other Miraculers defeat them, partly thanks to a calmed-down Ryuko. Later, Kagami joins her friends more often.: Notes: This episode premiered in Switzerland on RTS 1 on 24 May 2026.
155	24	"Queen of the Dreadzone" "La Reine de Frayeurville"	Thomas Astruc; Wilfried Pain	Thomas Astruc; Pierre Doublier; Sébastien Thibaudeau	27 September 2026	25 July 2026	624	N/A
When Chloé returns to Paris to film a movie, Sabrina, Marinette, and Zoé go to see her after Sabrina receives a supposed apology letter secretly written by Cerise to lure them in. Audrey was revealed to have lived up to her vows to have Chloé's life controlled by having Noé do it for her. Chloé plans to make fun of them, but her plan collapses. After being humiliated by Marinette, she becomes akumatized into "Dread Queen" with a power to create an indestructible "Dreadzone" that traps people and forces them to experience uncontrollable fear whenever she gets close. Ladybug and Cat Noir struggle against her powers, so Ladybug summons Vesperia and Miss Hound for backup. Vesperia is cornered, leading Dread Queen to almost get the Bee Miraculous, but the heroes eventually defeat her. As a result, Chloé is thrown out of Paris once again by Mayor Bustier, while Noé analyzes the charm that Chloé had been secretly given. In a stinger scene, Cerise travels to Shanghai to see Marinette's uncle and encounters Fei Wu.: Notes: This episode premiered in Switzerland on RTS 1 on 24 May 2026.
156	25	"Secret Protocol" "Protocole Secret"	Thomas Astruc; Wilfried Pain	Thomas Astruc; Pierre Doublier; Manuel Meyre; Sébastien Thibaudeau	4 October 2026	1 August 2026	625	N/A
In the midst of preparing multiple birthday surprises for Sabine, Marinette gets a surprise visit from her Uncle Wang. He gives her golden ladybug earrings as a gift, but Marinette quickly suspects that he is the holder of the Butterfly Miraculous, having also written several safety protocols to protect her identity. She temporarily lends her Miraculous to Alya, who unifies it with the Fox Miraculous to become "Renabug". Then, she sets off a trap for Uncle Wang that reakumatizes him into Kung Food, leading Renabug to call Cat Noir, Carapace, Polymouse, and Minotaurox for help. Once the heroes lead Kung Food to deakumatize himself, Renabug gives Marinette her Miraculous back, only for her, Sabine, and Tom to find out that Uncle Wang was never actually in Paris. Shocked at the revelation, Marinette reveals that she is Ladybug to her parents.
157	26	"Nemesis"	Thomas Astruc; Wilfried Pain	Camélia Acef; Thomas Astruc; Chloé Paye; Caroline Torelli; Sébastien Thibaudeau	11 October 2026	8 August 2026	626	N/A
After Alya suspects that Gabriel Agreste was Monarch, she confronts Marinette about the truth. Instead of answering directly, Marinette sets up a plan with the Miraculers to catch Chrysalis. With the help of Rooster Bold, Rena Rouge creates an invincible illusion of Marinette to be purposefully akumatized into "Nemesis", who can freeze humans with her lasers. The Miraculers raid Chrysalis lair but fail to catch her; they later learn that she can shapeshift into any person, which explains how Wang never came to Paris in the first place. Marinette confirms Monarch's identity to Alya, who warns her that she cannot assist her in hiding the truth. With no other option coming to mind, Marinette decides she will need to break up with Adrien.

== Production ==
This season is the first animated with Unreal Engine. It replaces Autodesk Maya, used in seasons 1 through 5.
