= Fly Music =

Defunct Spanish TV channel

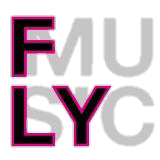
- Country: Spain

Ownership
- Owner: Vocento

History
- Launched: 30 November 2005; 19 years ago
- Closed: 30 June 2008; 17 years ago
- Replaced by: Disney Channel (on TDT)

Links
- Website: http://www.flymusic.tv/

Fly Music was a Spanish television channel broadcast in Spain by NET TV as a Spanish version of MTV. The channel broadcast a range of music videos and profiles of alternative artists (such as Goldfrapp, Björk, Massive Attack, Hercules & Love Affair, Antony & the Johnsons, MGMT, etc.), throughout the day during named strands. Examples of these strands included Fly Box, Fly Top and D-Club. Many of these programmes featured in-vision presenters. The channel was available through digital terrestrial television and other services.

Due to the channel's low audience numbers, Fly Music was replaced by Disney Channel on 30 June 2008.
