= Miraculous: Tales of Ladybug & Cat Noir season 7 =

Miraculous: Tales of Ladybug & Cat Noir
- Season 7
- Promotional poster
- No. of episodes: 6

Release
- Original release: November 1, 2026 – present

Season chronology
- ← Previous; Season 6

The seventh season of the French animated television series Miraculous: Tales of Ladybug & Cat Noir premiered in France on 1 November 2026, and it consists of 26 episodes.

This season follows Marinette Dupain-Cheng and Adrien Agreste as Ladybug and Cat Noir, respectively, as they protect Paris alongside the Miraculers from akumatized villains created by Chrysalis, who possesses the ability to impersonate others.

== Episodes ==
| No. overall | No. in season | English title French title | Directed by | Written by | Original air date (France) | English air date | Prod. code | U.S. viewers (millions) |
|---|---|---|---|---|---|---|---|---|
| 158 | 1 | "Replay Value (The Right Time - Part 1)" "Rediffuzion (Le Bon Moment 1ère partie)" | Thomas Astruc; Wilfried Pain | Thomas Astruc; Sébastien Thibaudeau; Manuel Meyre; Pierre Doublier | 1 November 2026 | 14 November 2026 | 701 | TBD |
In a flashback to "Nemesis", Chrysalis burns her lair to evade the Miraculers. Still suspecting that Marinette is Ladybug, she transforms into Aglaé - revealing that the two of them are the same person - and akumatizes Dr. Psiquat into "Replay Value," who can revisit past memories of whomever she touches. Using her help, Chrysalis revisits her entire journey of inheriting the Butterfly Miraculous to connect all the clues she witnessed. Meanwhile, Marinette seeks to find Aglaé to save her from akumatization while also struggling to break up with Adrien. She finds her address and attempts to get in her apartment, just as Chrysalis expands on her plan.: This episode premiered on Globoplay on 30 October 2026.
| 159 | 2 | "Chrysalis (The Right Time - Part 2)" "Chrysalis (Le Bon Moment 2ème partie)" | Thomas Astruc; Wilfried Pain | Thomas Astruc; Sébastien Thibaudeau; Manuel Meyre; Pierre Doublier | 1 November 2026 | 14 November 2026 | 702 | TBD |
Continuing to use the powers of Replay Value, Chrysalis retraces every character she morphed into with the intention of spying on Marinette. Replay Value suggests she drops the issue of Ladybug's identity and reflect on her childhood to truly solve her issues, but this sends her into a descent of insanity, leading her to decipher Cat Noir's identity instead. She ditches Replay Value and deakumatizes her, but not before Ladybug briefly talks to her; the hero realizes Chrysalis' name and the truth behind Aglaé. Chrysalis then confronts Cat Noir directly and tells him that Gabriel Agreste was Monarch, but Cat Noir doesn't believe her. She escapes both of them just as her apartment explodes. Afterward, Marinette finally breaks up with Adrien, much to both of their heartbreak.: This episode premiered on Gloob on 30 October 2026.
| 160 | 3 | "Dislove" "Désamour" | Thomas Astruc; Wilfried Pain | Thomas Astruc; Sébastien Thibaudeau; Caroline Torelli; Manuel Meyre | 8 November 2026 | 16 November 2026 | 703 | TBD |
It is André Bourgeois' first wedding anniversary since Audrey divorced him and he struggles to move on. Meanwhile, Marinette and Adrien have both holed up in their rooms, also unable to move on from their breakup. Adrien's heartbreak leads Cerise - who can somehow contact all of her disguises - to akumatize him into "Extinguisher", but he rejects the akuma just before Cerise can pry his identity from him. Marinette tells Alya and her parents the truth of Gabriel's identity as Monarch and Adrien's nature as a sentimonster. As a result, Alya finally changes her mind and becomes more supportive of Marinette's decision to hide the truth. However, Marinette is too tired to leap into action when André gets akumatized into "Dislove", who can suck the love from people, so Rena Rouge fills in for her. She falls victim to Dislove, so Ladybug and Cat Noir finish the battle. They help André move on before coming to peace with their own breakup.: This episode premiered on Globoplay on 6 November 2026.
| 161 | 4 | "Manageman" | Thomas Astruc; Wilfried Pain | Thomas Astruc; Sébastien Thibaudeau; Nolwenn Pierre | 15 November 2026 | 20 November 2026 | 704 | TBD |
Marinette is still depressed over breaking up with Adrien and being unable to reveal the entire truth, so Alya suggests that she gives up the role of guardian to her to improve her mental state. Marinette agrees and, in the process, loses all of her memories from her stint as the guardian up until that point, but not before leaving a message for her future self. Alya temporarily swaps Miraculous with Marinette while she helps Marinette adjust to her new state, then leaves to fight salesman Yvan Durev, who was akumatized into "Manageman", with the ability to make civilians act as project managers. However, Scarabella is affected by his powers, so Renardette and Cat Noir, unaware of his effects, defeat the villain themselves. Immediately after, the Miraculers discover that Chrysalis stole King Monkey's Miraculous and had been posing as him the entire time, but she escapes before they can catch her. After the revelation, Marinette reassumes the position of guardian and regains all of her memories, and all of the Miraculers share their identities - except for Ladybug and Cat Noir - to prevent another infiltration. Afterward, Marinette reconciles with Adrien as friends, while Cerise plans on getting closer with Adrien to figure out whether or not he's Cat Noir.: This episode premiered on Globoplay on 13 November 2026.
| 162 | 5 | "Marinette Dupain-Cheng" | Thomas Astruc; Wilfried Pain | Thomas Astruc; Sébastien Thibaudeau; Chloé Paye; Pierre Doublier | 22 November 2026 | 20 November 2026 | 705 | TBD |
Ladybug warns Paris that Chrysalis can take the form of anyone. The next day, a figure resembling Marinette goes to school wearing a mask and sunglasses, which leads Adrien and the Miraculers to suspect that she might be Chrysalis. While Alya convinces the Miraculers to give her space, Adrien confronts her as Cat Noir with the hope that Chrysalis orchestrated their breakup, only to discover that the masked person is indeed Marinette, who wore accessories because she was ashamed of being unable to have a relationship with Adrien. Cat Noir reassures her that her friends will always be there for her, and learns to accept the breakup for what it is. Later, it is revealed that Cerise is working with the Supreme and has taken the form of Lord Emil in an attempt to get closer to Adrien.
| 163 | 6 | "Glaciator Extreme" "Glaciator Extrême" | Thomas Astruc; Wilfried Pain | Thomas Astruc; Sébastien Thibaudeau; Chloé Paye; Caroline Torelli | 29 November 2026 | 20 November 2026 | 706 | TBD |
A flashback shows Tomoe giving Cerise a piece of technology that creates "antikumas" which can negate Miraculous powers. Meanwhile, Marinette, Adrien, and their friends visit André the ice cream man, who still believes they are in love. When they tell him the truth, André believes he has lost his talent, akumatizing him into "Glaciator Extreme", a variant of Glaciator with upgraded powers. During the battle, Chrysalis nullifies Carapace and almost steals the Turtle Miraculous, but Ladybug and Rena Rouge manage to recover it. With the akuma melted in the ice cream thrown into the Seine, Ladybug and Cat Noir convince Glaciator Extreme to deakumatize himself. As Marinette and Adrien, they later learn to remain friends without tempering their feelings. Later, a defeated Cerise complains to Tomoe about the antikumas, unaware that Tomoe used it to create a copy of the Miraculouses.
| 164 | 7 | "Camilo" | Thomas Astruc; Wilfried Pain | TBA | 6 December 2026 | TBA | 707 | TBD |
| 165 | 8 | TBA | Thomas Astruc; Wilfried Pain | TBA | TBA | TBA | TBA | TBD |
| 166 | 9 | TBA | Thomas Astruc; Wilfried Pain | TBA | TBA | TBA | TBA | TBD |
| 167 | 10 | TBA | Thomas Astruc; Wilfried Pain | TBA | TBA | TBA | TBA | TBD |
| 168 | 11 | TBA | Thomas Astruc; Wilfried Pain | TBA | TBA | TBA | TBA | TBD |
| 169 | 12 | TBA | Thomas Astruc; Wilfried Pain | TBA | TBA | TBA | TBA | TBD |
| 170 | 13 | TBA | Thomas Astruc; Wilfried Pain | TBA | TBA | TBA | TBA | TBD |
| 171 | 14 | TBA | Thomas Astruc; Wilfried Pain | TBA | TBA | TBA | TBA | TBD |
| 172 | 15 | TBA | Thomas Astruc; Wilfried Pain | TBA | TBA | TBA | TBA | TBD |
| 173 | 16 | TBA | Thomas Astruc; Wilfried Pain | TBA | TBA | TBA | TBA | TBD |
| 174 | 17 | TBA | Thomas Astruc; Wilfried Pain | TBA | TBA | TBA | TBA | TBD |
| 175 | 18 | TBA | Thomas Astruc; Wilfried Pain | TBA | TBA | TBA | TBA | TBD |
| 176 | 19 | TBA | Thomas Astruc; Wilfried Pain | TBA | TBA | TBA | TBA | TBD |
| 177 | 20 | TBA | Thomas Astruc; Wilfried Pain | TBA | TBA | TBA | TBA | TBD |
| 178 | 21 | TBA | Thomas Astruc; Wilfried Pain | TBA | TBA | TBA | TBA | TBD |
| 179 | 22 | TBA | Thomas Astruc; Wilfried Pain | TBA | TBA | TBA | TBA | TBD |
| 180 | 23 | TBA | Thomas Astruc; Wilfried Pain | TBA | TBA | TBA | TBA | TBD |
| 181 | 24 | TBA | Thomas Astruc; Wilfried Pain | TBA | TBA | TBA | TBA | TBD |
| 182 | 25 | TBA | Thomas Astruc; Wilfried Pain | TBA | TBA | TBA | TBA | TBD |
| 183 | 26 | TBA | Thomas Astruc; Wilfried Pain | TBA | TBA | TBA | TBA | TBD |
