= Sociedad Gestora de Televisión Net TV =

Spanish digital terrestrial TV licensee

Sociedad Gestora de Televisión Net TV, S.A. (Net TV Management Company) is a Spanish digital terrestrial television channel operator. The multiplex currently hosts Squirrel and Squirrel2.

== History ==
Sociedad Gestora de Televisión Net TV was formed in 2000 as a consortium between Vocento, Viaplus, Globomedia, Telson, and a series of additional minority stakeholders including Radio Intereconomía, Europroducciones and TF1 of France. It and Veo Televisión won concessions from the government of Spain in 2000, with Net TV receiving two DTT slots, expanding to four in 2005. The main network, general entertainment Net TV, began broadcasting in 2001; in 2005, it was joined by a second new network, music video channel Fly Music.

Vocento acquired a 48.5 percent stake in Pantalla Digital, which owned 26.24 percent of Net TV, from Avánzit in October 2003.

=== 2008: Enter Disney and Intereconomía ===
Net TV closed March 3, 2008, at which time it was ranked 26th among all TDT channels; Vocento's local TV channels continued to air some of its programs. It was replaced by Intereconomía TV after Intereconomía bought a 25 percent stake; the change marked the channel's return to the digital lineup.

Another major change in investors occurred that year when Dinamia sold its 20 percent share in Net TV to The Walt Disney Company. Fly Music—which was dead last in audience share, ranking 70th—remained on the air temporarily until Disney Channel debuted on July 1, 2008.

=== Expansion and contractions ===
After the Spanish government granted Net TV and other multiplex holders a full four channels in 2010, two new channels launched in the span of a week on the Net TV licenses in September 2010: MTV and La 10, which had previously launched earlier that year as a brand for Vocento-owned local stations and moved entirely to its national slot. One year after launching La 10 nationally, on September 20, 2011, Vocento announced the channel would close due to poor viewership; it then reached a deal in January 2012 for Viacom to take over the slot, marking its second channel on Net TV. Viacom took over in April 2012, launching Paramount Channel, a movie-oriented service making its worldwide debut in Spain.

The Supreme Court of Spain ruled in December 2012 to void the government action that expanded Net TV's offerings from two to four channels, stating that the move was illegal as it did not award the channels by way of a public bidding process.

In early 2014, in part as a result of this ruling, two Net TV channels ceased DTT broadcasts. On February 7, 2014, MTV left broadcast TV and became a pay channel on Canal+. Six days later, Intereconomía—suffering from financial difficulties and the departure of several key presenters—announced that its channel would cease airing nationally, with broadcasts continuing in Madrid and Valencia, where it held its own concessions. Vocento continued to be owed money from Intereconomía, which was placed into bankruptcy reorganization in 2015.

The two services were replaced with a home shopping channel, which ceased broadcasting on May 6, the day the court ruling was implemented and nine digital television channels closed.

Paramount Channel became Paramount Network in 2018, making Spain the first country to use the new brand beyond the United States.

=== Attempted partial sale to Viacom ===
After Intereconomía's bankruptcy liquidation, Vocento reached a deal to sell the company's former 25 percent stake to Viacom, which had also arranged to buy the share from Intereconomía directly prior to its bankruptcy. However, in 2017, the Spanish government denied the proposed transaction for reciprocity reasons, since it determined that a Spanish company could not own 25 percent of a media outlet in the United States, where Viacom is based. The move was read as a message from the government to keep television licenses in the hands of Spanish companies. It also came as a surprise to many in the industry, particularly given then-recent actions in the United States to selectively allow increased foreign ownership in the broadcasting sector.
