= Squirrel (TV channel) =

Spanish free-to-air TV channel

- Country: Spain
- Broadcast area: Spain, reaching bordering regions via overspill of the Spanish terrestrial network
- Headquarters: Madrid, Spain

Programming
- Language: Spanish
- Picture format: 1080i HDTV

Ownership
- Owner: Squirrel Media
- Sister channels: Squirrel Dos

History
- Launched: 7 January 2025; 22 months ago
- Replaced: Disney Channel (on DTT)

Links
- Website: squirreltv.es

Availability

Terrestrial
- Digital terrestrial television: Channel 23 (Madrid, HD)

Squirrel is a Spanish free-to-air movie network owned by Squirrel Media. The channel was launched on 7 January 2025, replacing Disney Channel in Spain on DTT.
