= Disney Channel (Spain) =

Spanish pay television channel

- Logo used since 1 July 2022
- Country: Spain
- Broadcast area: Spain; Andorra
- Headquarters: Calle de José Bardasano Baos, Madrid, Spain

Programming
- Languages: European Spanish (dubbing/subtitles); English
- Picture format: 1080i HDTV

Ownership
- Owner: The Walt Disney Company Spain
- Parent: The Walt Disney Company Iberia S.L
- Sister channels: Star Channel; National Geographic

History
- Launched: 17 April 1998; 28 years ago (pay television); 1 July 2008; 18 years ago (terrestrial television); 1 April 2026; 7 months ago (relaunch)
- Replaced: Fly Music (on DTT); Disney Jr. (relaunch)
- Closed: 7 January 2025; 21 months ago (original signal of DTT)
- Replaced by: Squirrel (on DTT)

Links
- Website: tv.disney.es

Disney Channel is a Spanish children's pay television channel operated by The Walt Disney Company Spain, a part of The Walt Disney Company Iberia and the Spanish variant of the American television channel of the same name. From 2008, it was available on Spanish terrestrial television in association with Net TV, until its departure from Spanish DTT on 7 January 2025. The channel relaunched on pay television 1 April 2026, replacing Disney Jr., whose programming moved to a morning programming block called "Disney Jr. en Disney Channel".

Originally launched as a pay television channel, a timeshift feed of the channel, Disney Channel +1, was launched in 2001, broadcasting the main feed but in a one-hour-delay.

A HD feed of Disney Channel was launched in December 2011, but it was restricted to subscription television providers until launching on DTT in 2024, after the Spanish government ordered television broadcasters to remove their SD feeds on the platform and exclusively broadcast in HD.

== History ==
Disney Channel Spain was launched in 1998, when The Walt Disney Company and Sogecable (now Prisa TV) made an agreement to distribute a Spanish version of the Disney Channel on the satellite platform Canal Satélite Digital. The channel began broadcasting on 17 April 1998. The channel carried locally-produced shows and Disney's animation library, as well as acquired content. In September, El rincón mágico, a preschool program, premiered on the channel. In November, it premiered La Liga Disney Channel, a football-themed game show. A Spanish version of the British show Art Attack, hosted by Jordi Cruz, was also produced and broadcast.

In February 1999, the channel had 100,000 subscribers. On 16 November 2001, Disney launched three more channels: a timeshift channel called Disney Channel +1, as well as two sister channels called Toon Disney and Playhouse Disney. Toon Disney's schedule exclusively aired Disney animation, while Playhouse Disney was a channel for preschool audiences. El rincón mágico was replaced by Playhouse Disney in 2001; filming for specialised segments started in June 2001, from the Madrid complex, which was shared between the five European versions available at the time. By 2002, the channel had 1,130,000 subscribers and a market share of 34% among the 4–14 demographic. Its local production increased in September 2002, with Zona Disney, replacing Zona 7 and merging with Telecinco's Club Disney block (with the "a" in Zona rendered with an at sign), the fifth season of La Liga Disney and the local version of Art Attack, as well as the acquired series Howdy Gaudi, created for the hundredth anniversary of the birth of Antoni Gaudí in 1952. Programming from the United States also premiered on the network including Kim Possible, The Proud Family and acquired series Jackie Chan Adventures.

In 2003, the channel premiered a television adaptation of Zipi y Zape produced by BRB Internacional, as part of Disney Channel's plan to support local animation. In September 2003, La Primera ported Zona Disney to compete with Telecinco's Max Clan. The TVE version included a segment called Retro-Zapping, with footage from TVE's own children's productions from its archives, as well as the FTA premiere of Kim Possible. In October, a new game show from the Madrid studios premiered on the channel, Enigma animal, with Jordi Cruz presenting short reports on a given species. The format tested viewers' knowledge about Spanish fauna, and gave the viewers the chance to search on the internet. For Christmas 2003, a contract was signed with the National Reading Plan giving viewers further incentives to read books, in the commercial breaks of Disney's channels.

American Dragon: Jake Long premiered in early 2005, as part of the main Zona Disney block. In December 2005, the channel started airing tips on healthy eating, after a protocol signed with the Ministry of Health. The success of High School Musical prompted Cuatro to buy the FTA rights for the flim, airing in November 2006, two months after its premiere on Disney Channel Spain.

In February 2008, The Walt Disney Company Iberia (TWDCI) announced its intent to acquire a 20% stake in digital terrestrial television multiplex operator Net TV. After the acquisition, Net TV was owned by Vocento (55%), Intereconomía Group (25%) and TWDCI (20%). In May 2008, TWDCI announced the launch of Disney Channel's terrestrial television service, replacing Net TV's Fly Music as a digital over-the-air channel on 1 July 2008. Similarly, on the same day, Toon Disney became Disney Cinemagic, a channel that was also used in other European markets.

On 1 May 2010, Disney Channel Spain started broadcasting in 16:9 widescreen. Disney Channel updated its logo in Spain on 20 June 2011, the website was also rebranded. In 2012, a service called Disney Replay was introduced, it aired full episodes of older series. In November 2013, the website was changed again along with the other European Disney Channels.

Disney Channel +1 was gradually discontinued over the course of the 2010s, being mostly replaced with Disney Channel HD. The channel was fully discontinued on 9 March 2017, after being removed from Vodafone TV, in favour of seven days of rewind features built into the television boxes.

In December 2012, Disney Channel attracted a 31.5% share in the 4–12 demographic. The series finale of Wizards of Waverly Place attracted a 34.7% share in the above demographic in March 2012, at least 1.8 million viewers of all demographics contacted with the episode for at least one second.

By the end of 2014, Disney Cinemagic had closed in Spain. Eventually, a spiritual successor would be launched in the form of Movistar Disney, a channel exclusive to the pay television operator Movistar Plus. The channel was launched on 22 December 2017, and closed by the end of March 2020, due to the launch of Disney+ in Spain, alongside Disney XD.

On 23 December 2021, it was announced that Disney had sold its 20% on Net TV to Squirrel Media, who acquired Vocento's 55% several weeks prior. This led to speculation about Disney Channel in Spain potentially closing, or at least leaving terrestrial television in Spain, similar to other versions of the channel worldwide since the launch of Disney+, despite the channel continuing to broadcast on Spanish DTT until its closure in 2025.

On 19 January 2024, it was announced that the DTT signal of Disney Channel Spain would upgrade from its 576i resolution to 1080i on 14 February 2024, due to the shutdown of SD signals on terrestrial television in Spain on that same day.

=== Original channel closure ===
On 27 November 2024, it was announced that Disney Channel Spain would close on 7 January 2025, as Disney Iberia was unable to renew agreements with Net TV to continue operating the channel in the respective country. Its content continued to be available in the country through Disney+ and its official YouTube channel. Its sister channel Disney Jr. was not affected by the shutdown and continued broadcasting on pay television. The channel's final day on air was marked by a nine-hour marathon featuring several landmark episodes and series finales, concluding with the Hannah Montana finale episode "Wherever I Go", before the channel's closure at midnight on 7 January 2025. On DTT, it was replaced by Squirrel. After its closure on Spanish DTT, its YouTube channel remained active with a live stream (limited to Spain) which showed selected programs.

=== Relaunch ===
On 5 March 2026, The Walt Disney Company Iberia announced the relaunch of Disney Channel in Spain, which occurred on 1 April 2026. It returned to the country as a pay television channel, which replaced the Spanish signal of Disney Jr., whose brand became a morning programming block in Spain.

== Logos ==
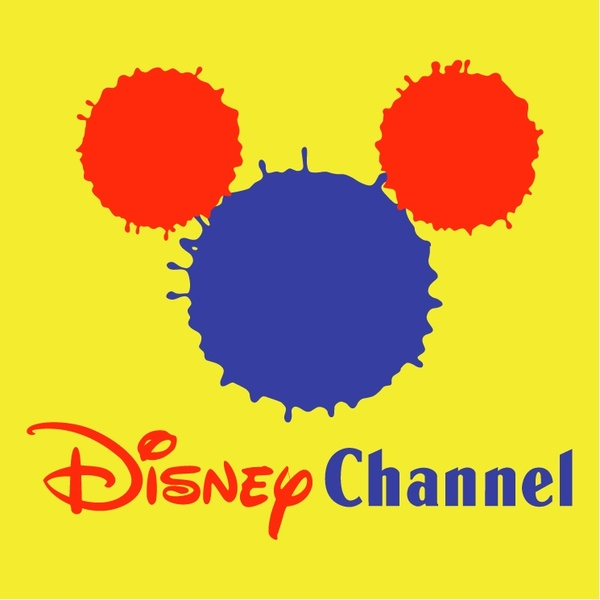
1998–2003

2003–2011

2011–2014

2014–2017

2017–2022

2022–2025; 2026–present

== See also ==
- Disney Channel (Portugal)
- Star Channel (Spain)
- The Walt Disney Company Iberia
