= TFOU =

French children's television programming block

Tfou
- Logo of Tfou
- Network: TF1
- Launched: January 1, 2007; 19 years ago
- Country of origin: France
- Owner: TF1 with “Protécréa” (Proté-création Production)
- Headquarters: Boulogne-Billancourt
- Formerly known as: TF! (1997–2006)
- Sister network: TFX
- Format: 4:3 then 16:9
- Running time: Weekdays 6 a.m. to 6.55 a.m. (TF1) and 6.55 a.m. to 8:30 a.m. (TFX); Wednesdays: 6.55 a.m. to 9.30 a.m. (TFX); Saturday morning: 6 a.m to 11 a.m. (TF1); Sunday morning: 6 a.m. to 10 a.m. (TF1)
- Original language: French
- Official website: www.tf1.fr/tf1/tfou-lemission

TFOU (French pronunciation: [tefu]) is a French children's morning programming block on TF1 and TFX. It was launched on 1 January 2007, replacing TF! Jeunesse.

TFOU is TF1's children brand, also operating as the SVOD service TFOU MAX. Originally, the brand started as TF1's children website in 2000, and as a TV channel in 2003 (which run until 2008). It became TF1's children programming block in 2007. Since 2024, from Monday to Friday, the block airs in two parts on TF1 and TFX. On Saturday and Sunday, the full block airs on TF1.

== History ==
=== TF! Jeunesse ===
TF! Jeunesse first appeared on Monday, September 1, 1997 on TF1, replacing Club Dorothée after 10 years, with the first episode of Beetleborgs. TF! Jeunesse was created by Dominique Poussier, the director of children's television for TF1. It was wanted that this new show would distance itself from its predecessor, whose shows had often been accused by parents and the Conseil supérieur de l'audiovisuel of being too violent, thus animes disappeared, replaced by a majority of French productions. Poussier had previously created the morning program Salut les Toons, which was presented by two CGI-generated mice, in 1996, and aired until 2000. It was given the difficult task of revitalizing children's programming on TF1, whose ratings had been in decline thanks to the popularity of Les Minikeums on France 3.

At the time of La Planète de Donkey Kong on France 2, Poussier suggested a program without animation and presenters using the same model in the UK from ITV's CITV. Childish voices chant the show's title: “T. F. Ouais !”, and an adult voice was the voice-over of the show (Bruno Choël, the French dub voice for Johnny Depp in Pirates of the Caribbean and Ewan McGregor in Star Wars). Unlike its predecessor, TF! and TFOU are produced internally under its Protécréa unit.

=== The Pokémon Phenomenon ===
In addition to new European programs, TF1 can rely on agreements with Nickelodeon (broadcasting Hey Arnold!) or the new Power Rangers series, known in France since 1993. But it is with the arrival of Pokémon in 2000, that the channel could find audiences equal to those of Club Dorothée. Surfing on this wave, Digimon quickly appears.

Suppose several series follow one another without making an impression. In that case, a few programs with audiences also appear (Franklin, Jimmy Neutron, Totally Spies!, Sonic Underground) and allow the channel to bounce back and resist Yu-Gi-Oh! and Sakura which aired on M6.

While Pokémon was acquired by Gulli in 2006, TF1 stayed a DVD distributor of the series. Pokémon had rebroadcasts on TF1 from 2009 to 2011, and nowadays, TFOU MAX has seasons of the series.

=== TFOU: Expansion on the Internet and as a TV channel ===
After creating tfou.fr, TF1's first children's website, in 2000, a TFOU TV channel was launched to strengthen the youth offering of TPS satellite package, of which Groupe TF1 was the main shareholder. TFOU targeted a more aged audience. TFOU was launched on 23 April 2003 without a license from the CSA, so it stopped broadcasting before resuming on May 28, 2003 after being approved.

The TF! programming block was rebranded as TFOU on 1 January 2007. On 28 August 2007, TFOU got a rebrand with a new logo, and the channel got renamed TFOU TV. TFOU TV was shut down on 28 February 2008, while a web TV was launched at the time. Its spot was replaced by Foot School TV.

=== Changes in scheduling and channels in 2024 ===
From January 8, 2024, TFOU was cut from TF1 on weekdays to be replaced by the new morning show Bonjour ! hosted by Bruce Toussaint. During the week, TFOU is broadcast on TF1 from 6 a.m. to 7 a.m. then switch to TFX from 7 a.m. to 8:30 a.m, and Wednesdays until 9:30 a.m., the move allowing to give TFOU longer broadcasts, like in some public holidays until noon. On the weekend, TF1 still air cartoons in the same schedule on Saturday from 6 a.m. to 11 a.m. and Sunday from 6 a.m. to 10 a.m.

Since 12 March 2025, Tfou on TFX has been extended until 12 a.m. on Wednesday mornings and during school holidays.

Since October 6, 2025, Tfou on TF1 starts at hour 5h50 from Monday to Sunday.

Since January 3, 2026, Tfou on TF1 has been extended until hour 11h45 on Saturday mornings following the discontinuation of Téléshopping.

== Visual identity ==
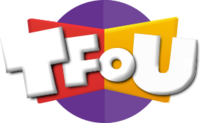
Tfou logo from January 1 to August 27, 2007 (normally without the purple circle behind)

Tfou logo since August 28, 2007.

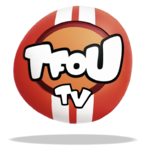
TFOU TV logo used from August 2007 until February 28, 2008
