= François Civil =

French actor (born 1990)

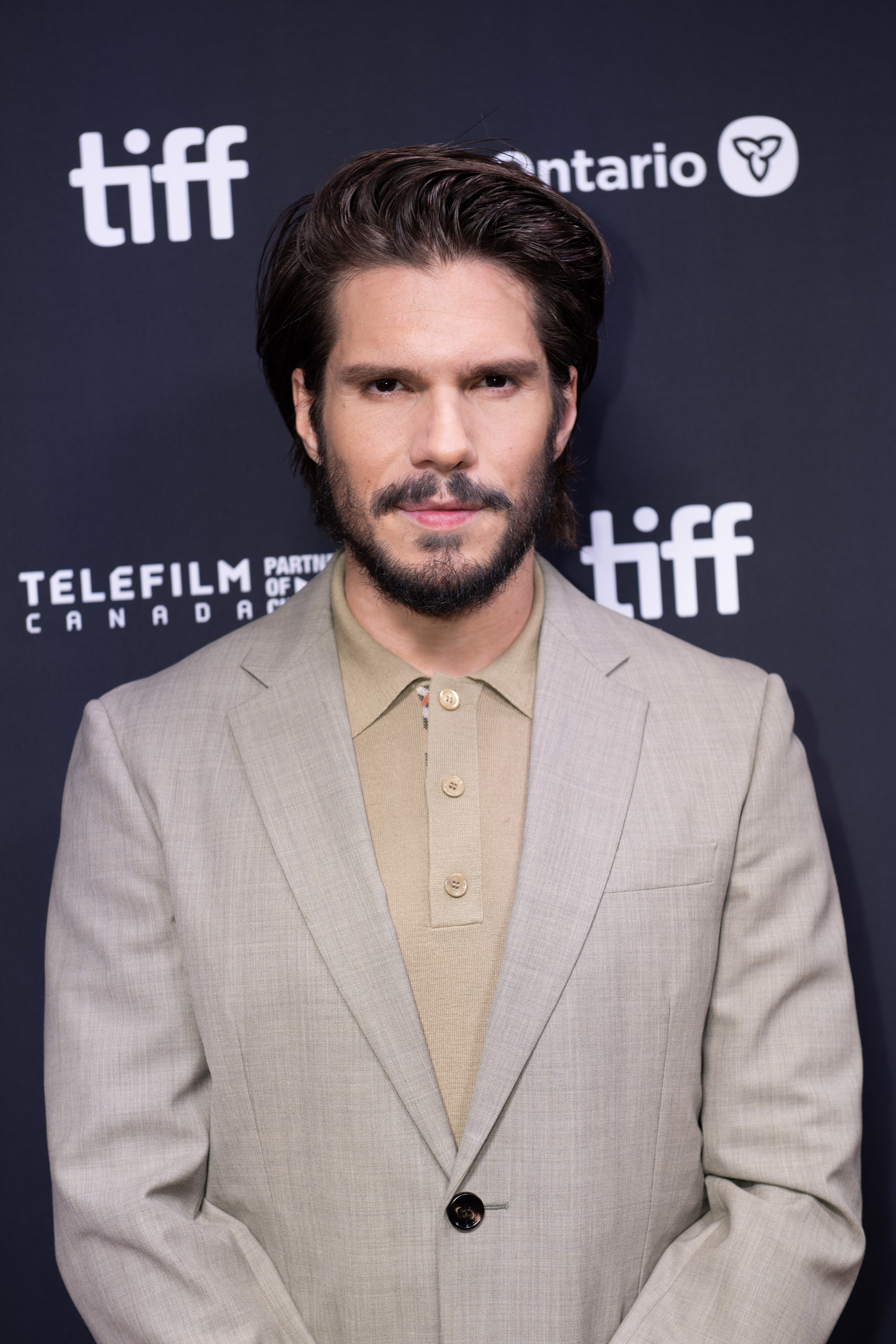
- Civil in 2025
- Born: 29 January 1990 (age 36); Paris, France
- Occupation: Actor
- Years active: 2005–present

François Civil (French pronunciation: [fʁɑ̃swa sivil]; born 29 January 1990) is a French actor. He has appeared in both French and English-language productions and is known for his roles in films such as Frank (2014), As Above, So Below (2014), Five (2016), Burn Out (2017), Love at Second Sight (2019), The Wolf's Call (2019), Who You Think I Am (2019), Someone, Somewhere (2019), BAC Nord (2021), for voicing Buzz Lightyear in the French version of the animated film Lightyear (2022), and for playing D'Artagnan in The Three Musketeers: D'Artagnan (2023) and The Three Musketeers: Milady (2023). On television, he has starred in the Disney Channel teen sitcom series Trop la Classe! (2006), in the France 2 comedy-drama series Call My Agent! (2015–17), and in the Netflix comedy miniseries Fiasco (2024).

Civil won a Chopard Trophy for Male Revelation at the 2019 Cannes Film Festival, and has earned two nominations for the César Award for Best Supporting Actor; for BAC Nord in 2022 and for Rise in 2023. He was named Actor of the Year by GQ France's Men of the Year Awards in 2023.

== Early life ==
Civil was born in the 12th arrondissement of Paris on 29 January 1990, to a French mother from Avignon and a Tahitian father. His parents are both university professors of Spanish. His paternal grandmother is Tahitian and his paternal grandfather is Catalan. He has an older sister.

In addition to his native French, Civil also speaks English, Spanish, and a bit of Italian.

Civil has a depigmentation of the skin of his arms and a lock of white hair since he was fifteen. He told French magazine Paris Match in 2019 that no doctor could tell him why, but he believes this happened due to stress.

Civil started acting at the age of fourteen. He signed up for an acting class because he wanted to get closer to a girl who was taking acting lessons. The feeling was not mutual, but he ended up falling in love with theater. After spotting him at a school play, the mother of one of the students who was also a casting director encouraged him to continue on this path and insisted that he should go to auditions. Thanks to her, he passed a test and landed a role in his first film, Le Cactus. Civil was also inspired to become an actor after watching the performance of Chinese actress Zhang Ziyi in Crouching Tiger, Hidden Dragon (2000). In 2006, he made a brief stint at the French drama school Cours Florent, which he did not like.

Civil was an hyperactive child and had trouble concentrating at school. Theatre, music and sports such as basketball helped him channel his energy and express himself.

== Career ==
=== Early work (2005–2015) ===
In 2005, while studying theater at the studio Le Magasin, Civil made his feature film debut with a small role in the comedy Le Cactus, directed by Michel Munz and Gérard Bitton. His second acting gig was an episode of the TV series Louis la Brocante.

In 2006, he played the high school student Dread in the Disney Channel France teen sitcom series Trop la Classe!, that led him to participate in the 2007 Disney Channel Games representing France.

Civil left Trop la Classe! when director Laurence Ferreira Barbosa offered him the leading role in her independent drama film Dying or Feeling Better (Soit je meurs, soit je vais mieux) released in 2008, in which he played a young schoolboy who falls in love with twin sisters. His performance, at the age of 18, earned him a nomination for the Lumière Award for Most Promising Actor, and a pre-nomination for the César Award for Most Promising Actor in 2009. That same year, he appeared in the web-series Twenty Show released on Myspace, which later became a TV film broadcast by Arte in May 2009.

He then continued his theater studies while filming for cinema and television, in particular with the main role in the short film In Our Blood (Dans nos veines), directed by Guillaume Senez, for which he won the Best Actor award at the Brussels Short Film Festival and the double award for interpretation (Jury Award and Audience Award) at the 15th Jean Carmet Festival in Moulins.

In 2010, he was a part of the young cast of the film Bus Palladium, directed by Christopher Thompson. That same year, he did not go to class for all of his senior year because he knew he wanted to pursue acting. He finally presented himself to the Bac exams and obtained it by chance. He stayed in high school for a total of five years after repeating his sophomore year three times.

In 2011, he starred in the World War II drama 15 Lads (Nos résistances) directed by Romain Cogitore, in which he portrayed a member of the French Resistance and received a second pre-nomination for the César Award for Most Promising Actor. He also reprised his role as Dread in the TV series Trop la Classe Café!, and appeared in the erotic drama film Elles directed by Małgorzata Szumowska, in which he played the teenage son of the protagonist portrayed by Juliette Binoche.

In 2013, he won the Premier Rendez-vous prize at the Cabourg Film Festival for his performance in the comedy film Macadam Baby, written and directed by Patrick Bossard. Between 2013 and 2015, he starred on Canal+'s Casting(s), a short comedy series about the world of cinema created by Pierre Niney and Ali Marhyar.

In 2014, he ventured into English-language productions, such as the independent British-Irish black comedy film Frank, directed by Lenny Abrahamson, in which he played Baraque, the bassist of the band Soronprfbs, led by the title character played by Michael Fassbender. Civil and the other actors of Frank performed the songs live in the film and in the album with the soundtrack. The band performed at concerts in real life to promote the film, such as the talk show The Colbert Report on 6 August 2014. Civil also played the urban explorer Papillon in the American horror film As Above, So Below, directed by John Erick Dowdle, and had a supporting role in the American mini-series Rosemary's Baby, directed by Agnieszka Holland.

In 2015, he filmed a pilot for a TV series created by Alan Ball and produced by Elton John for HBO called Virtuoso, which would be set in the 18th century and feature young musical prodigies from all over Europe who studied at the prestigious Academy of Musical Excellence in Vienna, where he would play the young Spanish guitarist and flautist Isidoro, but the channel did not pick it up as a series.

After several appearances in French TV series, in 2015 Civil landed a recurring supporting role as aspiring actor Hippolyte Rivière in the popular comedy series Call My Agent! (Dix pour cent), created by Fanny Herrero. He also had a supporting role in the thriller Made in France, directed by Nicolas Boukhrief.

=== Breakthrough (2016–present) ===
In 2016, he became known to the general public when he co-starred alongside Pierre Niney in the comedy film Five directed by Igor Gotesman, based on a 2011 short film of the same name that Civil and Gotesman had starred in. That same year, Civil and his co-stars from Five appeared in the music video for the song "Reuf" by French rapper Nekfeu, which was featured in the film's soundtrack.

In 2017, he starred in the French action film Burn Out directed by Yann Gozlan. He also played the youngest sibling of Ana Girardot and Pio Marmaï in the drama Back to Burgundy (Ce qui nous lie), directed by Cédric Klapisch.

He was a member of the jury of the "33 short films" section of the 2018 Cabourg Film Festival, and was also a member of the Revelation jury at the 2018 Deauville American Film Festival presided by Cédric Kahn.

The year 2019 allowed him to lead several projects: first the geopolitical thriller The Wolf's Call (Le Chant du loup) by Antonin Baudry; then in Safy Nebbou's psychological thriller Who You Think I Am (Celle que vous croyez) alongside Juliette Binoche; then he co-starred with Joséphine Japy in the romantic comedy Love at Second Sight (Mon Inconnue) directed by Hugo Gélin, which earned him the Best Actor award at the L'Alpe d'Huez Film Festival, and he also reunited with Cédric Klapisch and Ana Girardot in the romantic comedy Someone, Somewhere (Deux moi), for which he earned a nomination for the Globe de Cristal Award for Best Actor.

Civil won a Chopard Trophy for Male Revelation at the 2019 Cannes Film Festival. That same year, he was a member of the jury for the 9th Nikon Film Festival presided by Marjane Satrapi, and was also a member of the feature film jury at the 11th Beaune International Thriller Film Festival presided by Benoît Jacquot.

In 2020, he appeared in one episode of the Canal+ comedy series La Flamme, a spoof of reality dating competition shows.

In 2021, he starred the film BAC Nord directed by Cédric Jimenez, in which he played a police officer from the Anti-Crime Squad (BAC) of Marseille opposite Gilles Lellouche and Karim Leklou, which earned Civil a nomination for the César Award for Best Supporting Actor for his performance. He also had a supporting role as a motel manager whose right forearm had a prosthesis with a baseball glove replacing his hand in the comedy TV film La Vengeance au Triple Galop, a parody of the 1983 Australian TV series Return to Eden, directed by Alex Lutz and Arthur Sanigou and broadcast by Canal+ on 4 October 2021.

In 2022, he played the physiotherapist Yann in the comedy drama Rise (En corps) by Cédric Klapisch, for which he received his second César nomination for Best Supporting Actor. He also lent his voice to the character Buzz Lightyear in the French version of the animated film Lightyear, and he voiced the character Phillip Graves in the French version of the video game Call of Duty: Modern Warfare II.

In 2023, he portrayed D'Artagnan in two new French film adaptations of Alexandre Dumas' 1844 novel The Three Musketeers directed by Martin Bourboulon; The Three Musketeers: D'Artagnan and The Three Musketeers: Milady. D'Artagnan became his biggest commercial success, with over 3 million tickets sold in France. The same year, he played an undercover police officer who infiltrates a group of environmental activists in Romain Cogitore's romantic thriller A Place to Fight For (Une zone à défendre), the first French original film from Disney+.

In November 2023, Civil was named Actor of the Year by GQ France's Men of the Year Awards.

In 2024, Civil starred in the drama The Good Teacher (Pas de vagues), directed by Teddy Lussi-Modeste, in Beating Hearts directed by Gilles Lellouche, and in Fiasco, a comedy miniseries co-created by Pierre Niney and Igor Gotesman for Netflix.

In 2025, Civil starred in Arnaud Desplechin's drama Two Pianos, in which he portrays a pianist who lives an impossible love story.

In September 2025, Civil was cast as Charles Darnay in the upcoming BBC One British miniseries A Tale of Two Cities, adapted from the novel of the same name by Charles Dickens.

== Personal life ==
He has been in a relationship with actress Adèle Exarchopoulos since 2023. They worked together on BAC Nord and Beating Hearts.

== Other ventures ==
=== Photography ===
Civil is an amateur photographer. A series of photos taken by him entitled "Cambodia" were exhibited at the Atelier Couronnes in Paris between October and November 2017 during the Rencontres Photographiques du 10ème.

In an interview for Madame Figaro in April 2019, Civil announced that he was working on a photographic project around his anxiety about the passing of time and aging, and that this project would see the light of day "in perhaps twenty years".

=== Music ===
Civil is also a musician. He plays bass, guitar and piano. From 2009 to 2018, he was a member of an electro-folk/alternative-rock group called Collective Kingdom, for which he was the singer, the guitarist and the composer.

In March 2014, he composed the score for the short film La Nuit de Pierre Niney, directed by his long-time friend Pierre Niney for the promotion of the perfume La nuit de l'homme by Yves Saint Laurent.

In December 2022, he composed along with Ferdinand Cros the music for the short film Here & Now starring his longtime friend Pierre Niney for the Dior perfume Bois d'Argent.

=== Sports ===
He has been playing basketball since he was a teenager, and rock climbing since 2016.

=== Advertising campaigns ===
In May 2021, Civil became the new ambassador of the Italian high jewelry brand Bulgari.

=== Political views ===
In September 2018, following the resignation of the French Minister of Ecology Nicolas Hulot, Civil co-signed the column "The greatest challenge in the history of humanity", calling on the government to take "firm and immediate" action in the face of the danger of global warming.

In June 2023, Civil expressed his support to the French environmental activists known as "Zadists". He told Le Parisien in July 2023 that starring in the film A Place to Fight For (2023) was an engagement, even if it was anecdotal compared to that of the Zadists; and that he was very proud to star in this film because it sheds light on the ZAD and pays tribute to "these people who sacrifice a lot of their lives for the planet".

In March 2024, Civil expressed his support to the #MeToo movement in French cinema and to actresses Judith Godrèche and Anouk Grinberg, for the liberation of women's voices and against sexist and sexual violence in French cinema.

On 4 June 2024, he signed a petition addressed to French President Emmanuel Macron demanding France to officially recognize the State of Palestine.

On 28 June 2024, Civil shared two Instagram Stories encouraging his followers to vote against the French far-right party National Rally and against their candidate for French prime minister, Jordan Bardella, for the then-upcoming French parliamentary elections whose first round took place on 30 June 2024. On 6 July 2024, a day before the second round of the elections, he shared a post against the National Rally candidates.

== Filmography ==
Key
†	Denotes films that have not yet been released

=== Feature films ===
Year	Title	Role	Director	Notes
2005	Le cactus	Young Patrick	Gérard Bitton; Michel Munz	
2007	Molière	Louis Béjart	Laurent Tirard	
2008	Daddy Cool (15 ans et demi)	Festival goer	François Desagnat; Thomas Sorriaux	
2008	Dying or Feeling Better (Soit je meurs, soit je vais mieux)	Martial	Laurence Ferreira Barbosa	
2008	Sur ta joue ennemie	Milan	Jean-Xavier de Lestrade	
2008	Flirts	Xavier	Lionel Dos Santos	Short
2009	In Our Blood (Dans nos veines)	Lionel	Guillaume Senez	Short
2009	Omar	Arthur	Sébastien Gabriel	Short
2010	Bus Palladium	Mario	Christopher Thompson	
2011	15 Lads (Nos résistances)	François/Racine	Romain Cogitore	
2011	Une pure affaire	Tom	Alexandre Coffre	
2011	Five	Timothée	Igor Gotesman	Short
2011	Elles	Florent	Małgorzata Szumowska	
2012	Vacances	Romain	Frédéric Doll	Short
2013	The Stroller Strategy (La stratégie de la poussette)	François	Clément Michel	
2013	Fonzy	Hugo	Isabelle Doval	
2013	It Boy (20 ans d'écart)	Student	David Moreau	
2013	Pour le rôle	François	Pierre Niney	Short
2014	Frank	Baraque	Lenny Abrahamson	
2014	As Above, So Below	Papillon	John Erick Dowdle	
2014	Macadam Baby	Thomas	Patrick Bossard	
2014	Les Baumettes	Jean-Louis Raphel	Hugo Gélin	Short
2016	Made in France	Christophe	Nicolas Boukhrief	
2016	Five	Timothée	Igor Gotesman	
2017	Back to Burgundy (Ce qui nous lie)	Jérémie	Cédric Klapisch	
2017	Burn Out	Tony	Yann Gozlan	
2019	Love at Second Sight (Mon Inconnue)	Raphaël Ramisse/ Zoltan	Hugo Gélin	
2019	Who You Think I Am (Celle que vous croyez)	Alex Chelly	Safy Nebbou	
2019	The Wolf's Call (Le Chant du loup)	Chanteraide	Antonin Baudry	
2019	Someone, Somewhere (Deux moi)	Rémy Pelletier	Cédric Klapisch	
2021	BAC Nord	Antoine	Cédric Jimenez	
2022	Rise (En corps)	Yann	Cédric Klapisch	
2022	Lightyear	Buzz Lightyear	Angus MacLane	Voice; French version
2023	The Three Musketeers: D'Artagnan	D'Artagnan	Martin Bourboulon	
2023	A Place to Fight For (Une zone à défendre)	Greg	Romain Cogitore	Disney+ film
2023	The Three Musketeers: Milady	D'Artagnan	Martin Bourboulon	
2024	The Good Teacher (Pas de vagues)	Julien	Teddy Lussi-Modeste	
2024	Beating Hearts (L'Amour ouf)	Clotaire	Gilles Lellouche	
2025	Two Pianos	Mathias Vogler	Arnaud Desplechin	

=== Television ===
Year	Title	Role	Notes
2006	Louis la brocante	Arthur	TV series; 1 episode
2006	Trop la Classe!	Dread	TV series; 1 season
2007	Disney Channel Games	Himself	TV series; 9 episodes
2007	Autopsy	Paco Mercadier	TV movie
2008	P.J.	Axel Avranche	TV series; 1 episode
2008	Twenty Show	Victor	Web-series; 1 season
2009	Sweet Dream		TV series; 1 season
2009	Twenty Show: The Film	Victor	TV movie
2009	Enquêtes réservées	Antoine Morrand	TV series; 1 episode
2011	Simple	Enzo	TV movie
2011	Hard	Tony	TV series; 2 episodes
2011	Trop la Classe Café!	Dread	TV series; 1 season
2011	Emma	Jérôme	TV movie
2011	Tiger Lily, quatre femmes dans la vie	Ziggy	Miniseries; 6 episodes
2013	Le clan des Lanzac	Julien Verneuil	TV movie
2013	Alias Caracalla, au coeur de la Résistance	Maurice de Chaveigné	Miniseries; 2 episodes
2013–15	Casting(s)	François	TV series; 22 episodes
2014	Rosemary's Baby	Jacques	Miniseries; 2 episodes
2015	L'héritière	Guillaume	TV movie
2015–17	Call My Agent ! (Dix pour cent)	Hippolyte Rivière	TV series; 10 episodes
2017	Calls	Tom	TV series; 1 episode
2020	La Flamme	Luc	TV series; 1 episode
2021	La Vengeance au Triple Galop	Rodney Stingwing	TV movie
2024	Fiasco	Tom / Bartabé	Miniseries; 7 episodes
2026	A Tale of Two Cities †	Charles Darnay	Miniseries; main role

=== Video games ===
Year	Title	Role	Notes	Ref.
2022	Call of Duty: Modern Warfare II	Philip Graves	Voice role; French version	

== Theatre ==
Year	Title	Author	Director	Notes	Ref.
2010–11	Le Carton	Clément Michel	Arthur Jugnot	Palais des Glaces	

== Awards and nominations ==
Year	Award	Category	Work	Result	Ref.
2009	Lumière Awards	Most Promising Actor	Dying or Feeling Better	Nominated	
2009	Festival Jean-Carmet	Jury Award - Best Actor	In Our Blood	Won	
2009	Festival Jean-Carmet	Audience Award - Best Actor	In Our Blood	Won	
2010	Brussels Short Film Festival	Best Actor	In Our Blood	Won	
2013	Cabourg Film Festival	Premier Rendez-Vous	Macadam Baby	Won	
2019	L'Alpe d'Huez Film Festival	Best Actor	Love at Second Sight	Won	
2019	Cannes Film Festival	Chopard Trophy for Male Revelation	—N/a	Won	
2020	Globes de Cristal Award	Best Actor	Someone, Somewhere	Nominated	
2022	César Awards	Best Supporting Actor	BAC Nord	Nominated	
2023	César Awards	Best Supporting Actor	Rise	Nominated	
2023	GQ France Men of the Year Awards	Actor of the Year	—N/a	Won	
2024	French Association of Series Critics Awards	Best Supporting Actor	Fiasco	Nominated	
