= On verra =

On verra (French for 'We will see') may refer to:

- On verra, a 1998 album by Jocelyne Labylle
- "On verra", a 1977 song by Michaël Raitner
- "On verra ça", a 2003 song by Orchestra Baobab
- "On verra" (Nekfeu song), a 2015 song by Nekfeu
