= Fiasco (TV series) =

2024 French comedy television miniseries

- Promotional poster
- Genre: Comedy
- Created by: Igor Gotesman; Pierre Niney
- Written by: Igor Gotesman; Pierre Niney; Nicolas Slomka; Tania Gotesman
- Directed by: Igor Gotesman
- Starring: Pierre Niney; François Civil; Géraldine Nakache; Pascal Demolon; Leslie Medina; Louise Coldefy; Juliette Gasquet; Djimo; Marie-Christine Barrault; Vincent Cassel; Igor Gotesman
- Music by: Paul-Marie Barbier; Julien Grunberg
- Country of origin: France
- Original language: French
- No. of seasons: 1
- No. of episodes: 7

Production
- Producers: Igor Gotesman; Pierre Niney; Jérôme Cendron
- Cinematography: Julien Roux
- Editor: Stéphan Couturier
- Running time: 35 minutes
- Production companies: Five Dogs; Ninety Films

Original release
- Network: Netflix
- Release: 30 April 2024

Fiasco is a 2024 French comedy miniseries created, written and directed by Igor Gotesman, co-created and co-written by Pierre Niney for Netflix. It stars Niney, François Civil, Gotesman, Géraldine Nakache, Louise Coldefy, Leslie Medina, Pascal Demolon, Juliette Gasquet, Djimo, Marie-Christine Barrault, and Vincent Cassel. The series had its world premiere at the Canneseries Festival on 8 April 2024, and was released on Netflix on 30 April 2024. It received four nominations at the 2024 French Association of Series Critics Awards.

== Plot ==
Raphaël Valande is shooting his directorial debut film to pay tribute to his grandmother, who was a member of the French Resistance. Things starts to go wrong on the set and the shooting becomes a nightmare when a member of the team tries to sabotage the film, while everything is captured by a behind-the-scenes film crew.

== Cast ==
- Pierre Niney as Raphaël Valande
- François Civil as Tom / Bartabé
- Géraldine Nakache as Magali Verès
- Pascal Demolon as Jean-Marc Torrosian
- Leslie Medina as Ingrid Flamenbaum
- Marie-Christine Barrault as Huguette Valande
- Louise Coldefy as Ludivine
- Juliette Gasquet as Gabrielle
- Djimo as Karim
- Vincent Cassel as Robin Jacomet
- Igor Gotesman as Slice
- Claire Chazal as herself

== Production ==
=== Development ===
The series was created, written and directed by Igor Gotesman, co-created and co-written by Pierre Niney, and co-written by Nicolas Slomka and Tania Gotesman. It was co-produced by Five Dogs and Ninety Films. The score was composed by Paul-Marie Barbier and Julien Grunberg.

On 27 October 2022, Pierre Niney announced in his Instagram account that he was writing and was also going to co-produce and star in a new comedy series directed by his friend Igor Gotesman. "I could say that this is the big sister of the series Casting(s) and the film Five. You will find people that you may have liked," Niney said.

Niney said that Fiasco was mostly inspired by the chaotic filming of Mathieu Kassovitz's Babylon A.D. (2008) and its making-of documentary, Fucking Kassovitz (2011).

On 24 February 2023, Netflix France announced that the series Fiasco was being filmed and that it will have 7 episodes of 35 minutes. Netflix also shared a behind-the-scenes video showing the cast (Niney, François Civil, Gotesman, Géraldine Nakache, Louise Coldefy, Leslie Medina, Pascal Demolon, Juliette Gasquet, Djimo and Marie-Christine Barrault). Gotesman, Niney and Civil had previously worked together on the television series Casting(s) (2013–2015) and on the comedy film Five (2016). Niney said that they dreamed of making this project since Casting(s) and Five.

On 11 March 2024, Niney announced in his Twitter account that Vincent Cassel was also in the cast and that the release date of Fiasco would be announced the next day.

Gotesman said Fiasco will not have a season 2 because he conceived it as a miniseries. "I'm not closing the door in case I change my mind but, theoretically, there will never be a season 2 of Fiasco", Gotesman told French magazine Télé-Loisirs on 2 May 2024.

=== Filming ===
Principal photography began on 17 January 2023 under the title Making Of, and wrapped on 19 April 2023. Filming took place in Paris, Seine-et-Marne in Nandy, Saint-Chéron, and in Bruyères-le-Châtel, Essonne.

== Release ==
Fiasco made its world premiere at the Canneseries Festival out of competition on 8 April 2024, where the first three episodes were screened, before being released on Netflix on 30 April 2024.

== Episodes ==
No.	Title	Directed by	Written by	Original release date
1	"You're The Boss"	Igor Gotesman	Igor Gotesman, Pierre Niney, Nicolas Slomka, Tania Gotesman	30 April 2024
2	"Bad Bad Buzz"	Igor Gotesman	Igor Gotesman, Pierre Niney, Nicolas Slomka, Tania Gotesman	30 April 2024
3	"The After Buzz"	Igor Gotesman	Igor Gotesman, Pierre Niney, Nicolas Slomka, Tania Gotesman	30 April 2024
4	"Time's Up"	Igor Gotesman	Igor Gotesman, Pierre Niney, Nicolas Slomka, Tania Gotesman	30 April 2024
5	"In the Red"	Igor Gotesman	Igor Gotesman, Pierre Niney, Nicolas Slomka, Tania Gotesman	30 April 2024
6	"Truth or Dare"	Igor Gotesman	Igor Gotesman, Pierre Niney, Nicolas Slomka, Tania Gotesman	30 April 2024
7	"Dotting the I's"	Igor Gotesman	Igor Gotesman, Pierre Niney, Nicolas Slomka, Tania Gotesman	30 April 2024

== Reception ==
=== Critical response ===
Review aggregator Rotten Tomatoes gives the series a score of 83% based on 6 reviews, with a weighted average of 7.0/10.

=== Audience viewership ===
Fiasco debuted at number one on Netflix France 24 hours after its release, and was also in the top 10 in other six countries: Belgium, Guadeloupe, Luxembourg, Switzerland, Réunion and New Caledonia, and at number seven on Netflix's Global Top 10 TV Non-English titles for the tracking week of 29 April–5 May 2024, with 6 million hours viewed. It remained at number one on Netflix France for the tracking week of 6–12 May 2024, and was also in the top 10 in other five countries: Belgium, Luxembourg, Switzerland, Réunion and New Caledonia. It dropped to number three in France for the tracking week of 13–19 May 2024, and was ranked at number six for the tracking week of 20–26 May 2024, remaining in the top 10 for four weeks.

According to the streaming aggregator JustWatch, Fiasco was the most streamed TV show across all platforms in France in its first week of release. It was ranked at number 3 on its second week, number 7 on its third week, and at number 10 on its fourth week, making it the fifth most streamed TV show across all platforms in France in May 2024.

== Accolades ==
Year	Award	Category	Recipient(s)	Result	Ref.
2024	French Association of Series Critics Awards	Best Series 26′	Fiasco	Nominated	
2024	French Association of Series Critics Awards	Best Performance 26′	Pierre Niney	Nominated	
2024	French Association of Series Critics Awards	Best Supporting Actor 26′	François Civil	Nominated	
2024	French Association of Series Critics Awards	Best Supporting Actor 26′	Pascal Demolon	Won	
