= Mon âme =

Mon âme (French 'my soul') may refer to:

== Poetry ==
- "Mon âme", poem by Raymond Roussel
- "Mon âme", poem by Émile Nelligan
- "Mon âme", poem by Pierre-Jean de Béranger

== Music ==
- "Mon âme" (Nekfeu song), a 1995 song by French hip hop artist Nekfeu
