= Someone, Somewhere =

2019 film

- Theatrical release poster
- French: Deux moi
- Directed by: Cédric Klapisch
- Written by: Cédric Klapisch; Santiago Amigorena
- Produced by: Cédric Klapisch; Bruno Levy
- Starring: François Civil; Ana Girardot
- Cinematography: Élodie Tahtane
- Edited by: Valentin Féron
- Music by: Loïc Dury; Christophe Minck
- Production companies: Ce Qui Me Meut; France 2 Cinéma; StudioCanal
- Distributed by: StudioCanal
- Release dates: 21 August 2019 (FFA); 11 September 2019 (France)
- Running time: 110 minutes
- Country: France
- Language: French
- Budget: $7 million
- Box office: $5.5 million

Someone, Somewhere (French: Deux moi, lit. 'Two me') is a 2019 French comedy film directed by Cédric Klapisch, starring François Civil and Ana Girardot. The film premiered at the 2019 Festival du film francophone d'Angoulême (FFA).

== Synopsis ==
Rémy, who has an unskilled job, and Mélanie, who works in scientific research, are two thirty-year-old Parisians at the mercy of a depressive mood. Victims of the loneliness of the metropolis, they try in vain to meet someone somewhere, especially on social media, even if they live right on the same floor of two terraced houses. Both undergo psychotherapy and thus embark on a path that will lead them in the same direction.

== Cast ==
- François Civil as Rémy Pelletier
- Ana Girardot as Mélanie Brunet
- Camille Cottin as Mélanie's psychologist
- François Berléand as J.B. Meyer (Rémy's psychologist)
- Simon Abkarian as Mansour
- Eye Haïdara as Djena
- Rebecca Marder as Capucine Brunet
- Pierre Niney as Mathieu Bernard
- Virginie Hocq & Zinedine Soualem as The pharmacists
- Paul Hamy as Steevy
- Marie Bunel as Madame Pelletier
- Patrick d'Assumçao as Monsieur Pelletier

== Production ==
Both leads were already present in the director's previous film, Back to Burgundy (2017).

== Release ==
The film had its world premiere at the Festival du film francophone d'Angoulême on 21 August 2019. It was released in theaters starting in France on 11 September 2019, and on VOD by Distrib Films on 6 October 2020.

== Reception ==
=== Box office ===
Someone, Somewhere grossed an unknown amount in North America and $5.5 million worldwide.

=== Critical response ===
As of January 2021, all of the eight critical reviews compiled on Rotten Tomatoes are positive, with an average rating of 7.9/10.
