= Emma Becker =

French writer (born 1988)

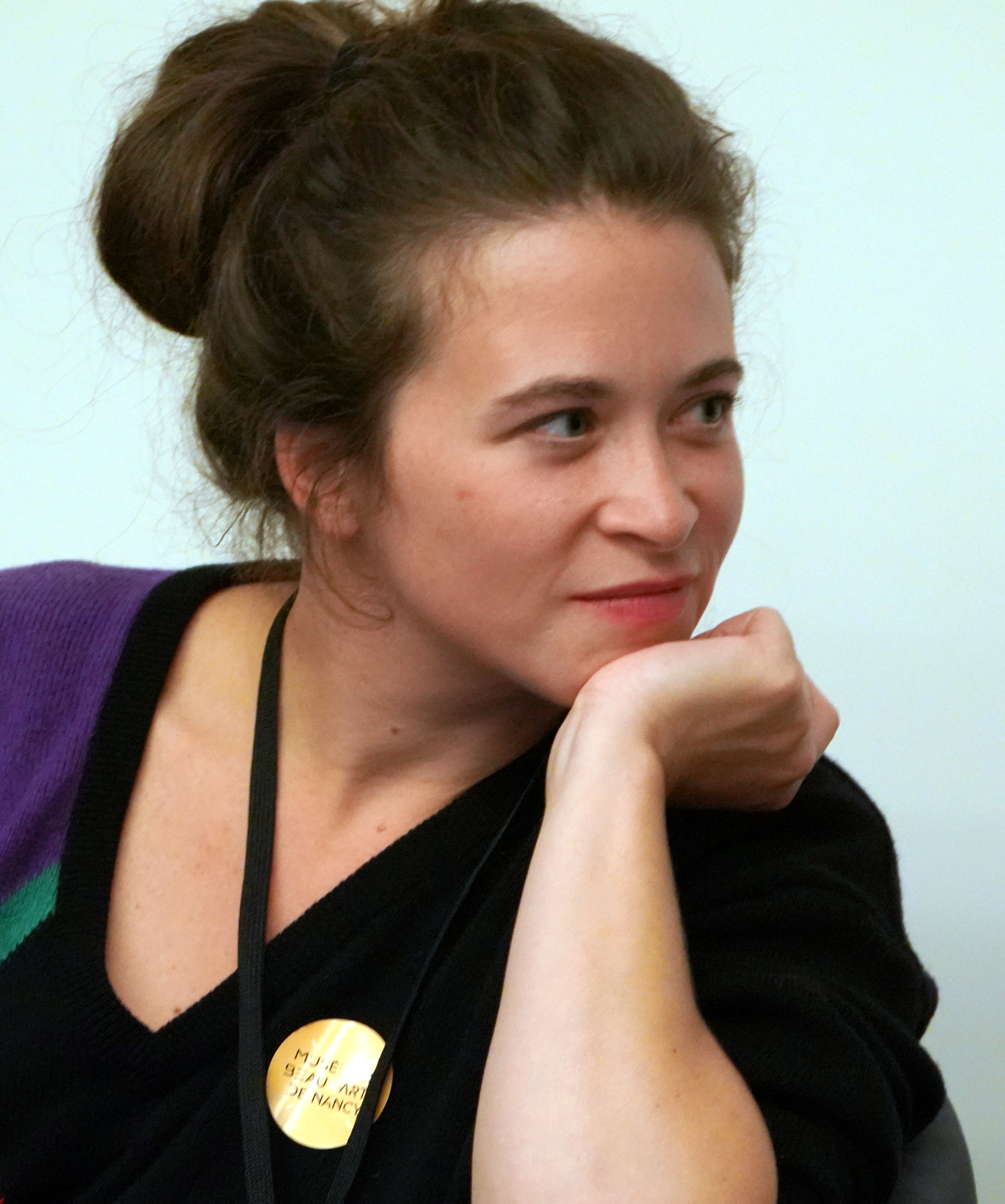
- Emma Becker in 2024
- Born: Emma Durand; 14 December 1988 (age 37)

Emma Becker (born 14 December 1988 in Île-de-France as Emma Durand) is a French writer living in Paris. Her pen name Becker is derived from Pannebecker, the family name of her German grandmother.

== Biography ==
Becker grew up in a middle-class family in Île-de-France (greater Paris region). Her father was an entrepreneur and her mother a psychologist. She attended a Catholic high school (lycée Montalembert), which she completed with the Baccalauréat (high school diploma) in 2006. Afterwards she studied literature at the Sorbonne Nouvelle University. In 2011 she published her first book, an erotic novel with the title Mr. It describes the relationship of young female student and an older married man based on her own experiences. After a failed relationship Becker left Paris to move to Berlin, where one of her aunts lived. There she worked on her second book and gave birth to a son. After the publication of her second book, she became interested in writing about prostitution and in an effort to immerse herself into that world she worked for two years as a prostitute in two local brothels. She described her experiences later in the autofiction novel La Maison, which was published in 2019. The novel received nominations for the Prix Renaudot and the Prix de Flore and won the Prix du Roman des étudiants France Culture–Télérama. In 2022 it was adapted into the movie House of Lust with Ana Girardot playing the main character.

Becker relocated to the south of France in 2021, got married and gave birth to a second son.

== Books ==
- Mr. Éditions Denoël, 2011, ISBN 978-2-207-10950-2
  English edition: Monsieur. Arcade Publishing, 2012, translated by Maxim Jakubowski
- Alice. Éditions Denoël, 2015, ISBN 978-2-207-12380-5
- La Maison. Éditions Flammarion, 2019, ISBN 978-2-08-147040-8
- L’inconduite. Éditions Albin Michel, 2022, ISBN 978-2-22-647560-2
- Odile l'été. Julliard editions, 2023 ISBN 9782260055112
- Le Mal joli. Éditions Albin Michel, 2024
