= Inhuman Resources =

French television mini-series

- Genre: Drama; Thriller
- Starring: Eric Cantona; Suzanne Clément; Alex Lutz
- Music by: Eric Neveux
- Country of origin: France
- Original language: French
- No. of seasons: 1
- No. of episodes: 6

Production
- Running time: 52 min.
- Production companies: Mandarin Television; ARTE; Centre National du Cinéma et de l'Image Animée

Original release
- Network: Arte
- Release: 16 April 2020

Inhuman Resources (French: Dérapages) is a 2020 French-language television miniseries based on the book Cadres Noirs by Pierre Lemaitre, starring Eric Cantona, Suzanne Clément and Alex Lutz.

== Plot ==
Alain Delambre (Eric Cantona) has been out of work for six years after his company downsized by firing all older employees. He finally receives an interview for the company Exxya. As part of the interview process, he is asked to ask questions as a hostage taker in a role playing game where the executives for Exxya will be held hostage. Alain does not know that the president of the company is using the exercise to figure out which of the executives will be best to handle a volatile situation after Exxya fires at least 2,500 employees at a factory. The executives think that the hostage situation is real. Alain steals money from his pregnant daughter and repeatedly lies to his family to train for the hostage scenario. Just before it is to begin, he is told that the position was already filled and he is only being included to demonstrate a diverse pool of candidates. In anger, Alain decides to make the scenario a real hostage taking.

== Cast ==
- Eric Cantona as Alain Delambre
- Suzanne Clément as Nicole Delambre
- Alex Lutz as Alexandre Dorfmann
- Gustave Kervern as Charles Bresson
- Alice de Lencquesaing as Lucie Delambre
- Louise Coldefy as Mathilde Delambre
- Adama Niane as David Fontana
- Aton as Antoine
- Soraya Garlenq as Yasmine
- Carlos Chahine as Paul Cousin
- Eurydice El-Etr as Clémentine Haddad
- Cyril Couton as Jean-Marie Guéneau
- Nicolas Martinez as Grégory Ziegler
- Xavier Robic as Bertrand Lacoste
- Clémence Bretécher as Stéphanie Gilson
- Aleksandra Yermak as Florence Ancelin
- Émilie Gavois-Kahn as the judge

== Release ==
Inhuman Resources was released on April 26, 2020 on Arte.
