= Martin Eden (Nekfeu song) =

Song by Nekfeu

from the album Feu
- Released: 8 June 2015
- Genre: French hip hop
- Length: 4:55
- Label: Seine Zoo; Polydor; Universal
- Songwriter(s): Ken Samaras; Hugz Hefner
- Producer(s): Nekfeu; DJ Elite

Audio sample
- "Martin Eden": file; help

"Martin Eden" is a song by French hip hop artist Nekfeu, produced by himself and DJ Elite. The first track from Nekfeu's debut studio album Feu, the song entered the French Singles Chart at number 129 on 20 June 2015, where it has since peaked, despite not being officially released as a single.

== Track listing ==
- Digital download
1. "Martin Eden" – 4:55

== Chart performance ==
Chart (2015)	Peak position
France (SNEP)	129
