= Love at First Child =

2015 film by Anne Giafferi

- Theatrical release poster
- Ange et Gabrielle
- Directed by: Anne Giafferi
- Screenplay by: Anne Giafferi; Anne Le Ny
- Based on: the play L'Éveil du Chameau by Murielle Magellan
- Produced by: Marc Olla; Benoît Jaubert
- Starring: Isabelle Carré; Patrick Bruel
- Cinematography: Stéphane Cami
- Edited by: Christine Lucas-Navarro
- Music by: Jean-Michel Bernard
- Production companies: Palazzo Films; Benji Films
- Distributed by: UGC Distribution
- Release date: 11 November 2015
- Running time: 91 minutes
- Country: France
- Language: French
- Budget: €6.9 million
- Box office: $3.8 million

Love at First Child (original title: Ange et Gabrielle) is a 2015 French romantic comedy film directed by Anne Giafferi and starring Isabelle Carré and Patrick Bruel. The screenplay by Anne Giafferi and Anne Le Ny is based on a play by Murielle Magellan.

== Cast ==
- Isabelle Carré as Gabrielle
- Patrick Bruel as Ange
- Alice de Lencquesaing as Claire
- Thomas Solivéres as Simon
- Carole Franck as Caroline
- Laurent Stocker as Guillaume
- Louise Coldefy as Élodie
