= Nique les clones, Pt. II =

Single by Nekfeu

from the album Feu
- Released: 25 May 2015
- Recorded: 2015
- Genre: French hip hop; conscious hip hop
- Length: 3:44
- Label: Seine Zoo; Polydor; Universal
- Songwriters: Ken Samaras; Enzo Serra
- Producers: Nekfeu; DJ Elite

Nekfeu singles chronology
"On verra" (2015)	"Nique les clones, Pt. II" (2015)	"Tempête" (2015)

Audio sample
- "Nique les clones, Pt. II": file; help

Music video
- "Nique les clones, Pt. II" on YouTube

"Nique les clones, Pt. II" (Note: Nique les clones (French for '"Fuck clones"').) is a song by French hip hop artist Nekfeu, produced by himself and DJ Elite. It was released on May 25, 2015 as the third single from his debut studio album Feu.

The song entered the French Singles Chart at number 62 on May 30, 2015, and peaked at number 57.

== Music video ==
A lyric video for the song was published on YouTube on May 28, 2015.

== Track listing ==
- Digital download
1. "Nique les clones, Pt. II" – 3:44

== Chart performance ==
Chart (2015)	Peak position
France (SNEP)	57
