= Égérie (song) =

Single by Nekfeu

from the album Feu
- Released: 3 April 2015
- Recorded: 2015
- Genre: French hip hop; psychedelic hip hop; trip hop
- Length: 3:29; 3:30 (album version)
- Label: Seine Zoo; Polydor; Universal
- Songwriters: Ken Samaras; Hugz Hefner
- Producers: Nekfeu; DJ Elite

Nekfeu singles chronology
"Time B.O.M.B." (2014)	"Égérie" (2015)	"On verra" (2015)

Audio sample
- "Égérie": file; help

Music video
- "Égérie" on YouTube

"Égérie" (French for 'Muse') is a song by French hip hop artist Nekfeu, produced by himself and DJ Elite. It was released on April 3, 2015 as the lead single from his debut studio album Feu. It entered the French Singles Chart at number 49 on 11 April 2015, where it has since peaked.

== Music video ==
The music video for the song was released on YouTube as part of the single's release on 3 April 2015. It is 4 minutes and 3 seconds long.

Directed by Dawid Krepski, the video begins with a woman opening the trunk of a fifth-generation Chevrolet Camaro and stabbing at something inside before closing the trunk and entering the car, with Nekfeu waiting inside. The two share a kiss before the woman drives off as Nekfeu raps the lyrics to the song. The video is filled with a variety of psychedelic images and ends with a shot of the car being driven away into the horizon on a lonely desert road.

== Track listing ==
- Digital download
1. "Égérie" – 3:29

== Chart performance ==
Chart (2015)	Peak position
France (SNEP)	49
