= Time B.O.M.B. =

Single by Nekfeu
- Released: 19 December 2014
- Genre: French hip hop; boom bap
- Length: 4:38
- Label: Seine Zoo; Polydor; Universal
- Songwriter: Ken Samaras
- Producer: 90' Box

Nekfeu singles chronology
"La danse de l'homme saoul" (2013)	"Time B.O.M.B." (2014)	"Égérie" (2015)

Audio sample
- "Time B.O.M.B.": file; help

Music video
- "Time B.O.M.B." on YouTube

"Time B.O.M.B." (stylised "TIME B.O.M.B.") is a song by French hip hop artist Nekfeu and produced by 90' Box. It was released on December 19, 2014, as a single, and entered the French Singles Chart at number 86 on 27 December 2014, where it has since peaked.

== Music video ==
A music video for the song was released on YouTube on 3 July 2015. Like the song itself, the video is 4 minutes and 38 seconds long and was directed by GVRCH and Clifto Cream.

== Track listing ==
- Digital download
1. "Time B.O.M.B." – 4:38

== Chart performance ==
Chart (2014)	Peak position
France (SNEP)	86
