= Final Set =

- International release poster
- French: Cinquième set
- Directed by: Quentin Reynaud
- Written by: Quentin Reynaud
- Starring: Alex Lutz; Ana Girardot; Kristin Scott Thomas
- Cinematography: Vincent Mathias
- Edited by: Jean-Baptiste Beaudoin
- Music by: Delphine Malaussena
- Production company: 22h22
- Distributed by: Apollo Films; StudioCanal
- Release dates: 30 August 2020 (Angoulême); 16 June 2021 (France)
- Running time: 105 minutes
- Country: France
- Language: French

Final Set (French: Cinquième set) is a 2020 French sports drama film written and directed by Quentin Reynaud. It stars Alex Lutz as an aging tennis player who competes in the qualifying rounds of the French Open for one last attempt at glory. The film premiered at the 2020 Angoulême Francophone Film Festival. It was later released in France on 16 June 2021.

== Premise ==
Thomas Edison was once renowned as a young tennis prodigy, but never had the career he hoped for. At 37, despite his declining physical fitness and shattered knee he decides to compete in the intense qualifying rounds of the French Open at Roland-Garros for one last attempt at glory. Although his wife Eve and mother Judith advise him to give up, Thomas obsessively pushes forward. He will have to fight his own demons and will ultimately face a determined young player who reminds him of his younger self.

== Cast ==
- Alex Lutz as Thomas Edison
- Ana Girardot as Eve, Thomas's wife
- Kristin Scott Thomas as Judith Edison, Thomas's mother
- Jürgen Briand as Damien Thosso
- Tariq Bettahar as Marc
- Quentin Reynaud as JB
- Paul-Henri Mathieu as himself
- Lionel Chamoulaud as himself (commentator)
- Arnaud Boetsch as himself (commentator)

== Production ==
Final Set was writer-director Quentin Reynaud's second film following Paris-Willouby, released in 2015. Reynaud, himself a former tennis player, sought to create a tennis film with tennis at the forefront of the story. To this end, he became the first French director to be authorized to film on the Roland-Garros grounds, specifically Court 14. Alex Lutz had to undergo training to be able to achieve the realistic "posture" of a tennis player and worked extensively with Reynaud to achieve that. Prior to filming, Lutz claimed that he had the tennis skill of a "beach badminton" player, so he worked to create specific mannerisms on the court.

Jürgen Briand, who portrayed the young prodigy Damien Thosso, is himself a current French tennis player achieving a career high ATP ranking of 403.

== Reception ==
=== Box office ===
In France, the film earned $418,659, where it premiered for five weeks.

=== Critical response ===
On the review aggregator website Rotten Tomatoes, 88% of eight critics' reviews are positive.
