= Jules Houplain =

French actor

Jules Houplain (born 4 February 1998) is a French actor known for his film roles as Louis in Hidden Kisses (2016) and Luis in On voulait tout casser, as Juliette Binoche's character's son, Max in Who You Think I Am (2019), as well for portraying Yann Desgrange on the French television series Les Innocents (2018).
