= Who You Think I Am =

2019 film by Safy Nebbou

- Theatrical release poster
- French: Celle que vous croyez
- Directed by: Safy Nebbou
- Screenplay by: Safy Nebbou; Julie Peyr
- Based on: Celle que vous croyez by Camille Laurens
- Produced by: Michel Saint-Jean
- Starring: Juliette Binoche; François Civil; Nicole Garcia
- Cinematography: Gilles Porte
- Edited by: Stéphane Pereira
- Music by: Ibrahim Maalouf
- Production companies: Diaphana Films; France 3 Cinéma; Scope Pictures
- Distributed by: Diaphana Distribution (France); Cinéart (Belgium)
- Release dates: 10 February 2019 (Berlinale); 27 February 2019 (France); 6 March 2019 (Belgium)
- Running time: 101 minutes
- Countries: France; Belgium
- Language: French
- Budget: €5.6 million
- Box office: $3.3 million

Who You Think I Am (French: Celle que vous croyez) is a 2019 drama film directed by Safy Nebbou and starring Juliette Binoche, François Civil and Nicole Garcia. It is based on the 2016 novel Celle que vous croyez by Camille Laurens.

== Plot ==
Claire, a middle-aged professor of French literature, shares custody of her two sons with her ex-husband Gilles. She carries on an affair with the younger Ludovic, who obviously sees it as more casual than Claire. He soon distances himself from her, and when she calls, his roommate Alex answers the phone and pretends Ludo is out.

Claire creates a fake persona, "Clara Antunès", on Facebook, to connect with Alex, gradually developing an emotional and cybersexual affair with him. When Alex grows insistent upon meeting in person, Claire, as Clara, says she's getting married and moving to Brazil, calling off the affair rather than risk a meeting. Alex deletes his profile, leading Claire to approach Ludovic to find out about him. He tells her that Alex, broken-hearted over a "psychopath" on Facebook, has killed himself.

These narrative details are revealed through a series of psychotherapy sessions between Claire and Dr Bormans. Bormans asks Claire to be honest about a detail in her story that does not add up, leading Claire to disclose that the photos and videos of "Clara" used during her communications with Alex actually belong to her estranged niece, Katia, whom she brought up.

Bormans receives a dossier from Claire containing a story in which she makes Alex's acquaintance alter the end of the "Clara" persona. In the story, Alex and Claire become live-in lovers, but a nagging doubt over whether "Clara" retains a place in his heart leads Claire to revive the persona and ask Alex for a meeting. Alex, trying to ring "Clara", finds the hidden phone Claire had used for "Clara"; returning to confront Claire, he unnerves her to the point where she walks backwards into traffic and is presumably killed. Bormans concludes from the story that Claire is unwilling to allow herself any happiness, even in a work of fiction. It is revealed that Claire is a patient in a clinic for treatment of a mental disorder.

Later, Bormans seeks out Ludovic, who reveals that, having heard "Clara's" voice in one of her calls to Alex, he had seen through her and later invented the story of Alex's death. Dr. Bormans brings this information to Claire, who confesses that it was for her niece Katia that Gilles had left her. Claire now appears ready to leave the institution.

In the last scene, Claire dials Alex's number from "Clara's" phone.

== Cast ==
- Juliette Binoche as Claire Millaud
- François Civil as Alex Chelly
- Nicole Garcia as Dr. Catherine Bormans
- Marie-Ange Casta as Katia
- Guillaume Gouix as Ludovic Dalaux
- Charles Berling as Gilles
- Jules Houplain as Max
- Jules Gauzelin as Tristan
- Francis Leplay as Serge
- Pierre Giraud as Paul
- Claude Perron as Solange
Actors in the leading roles

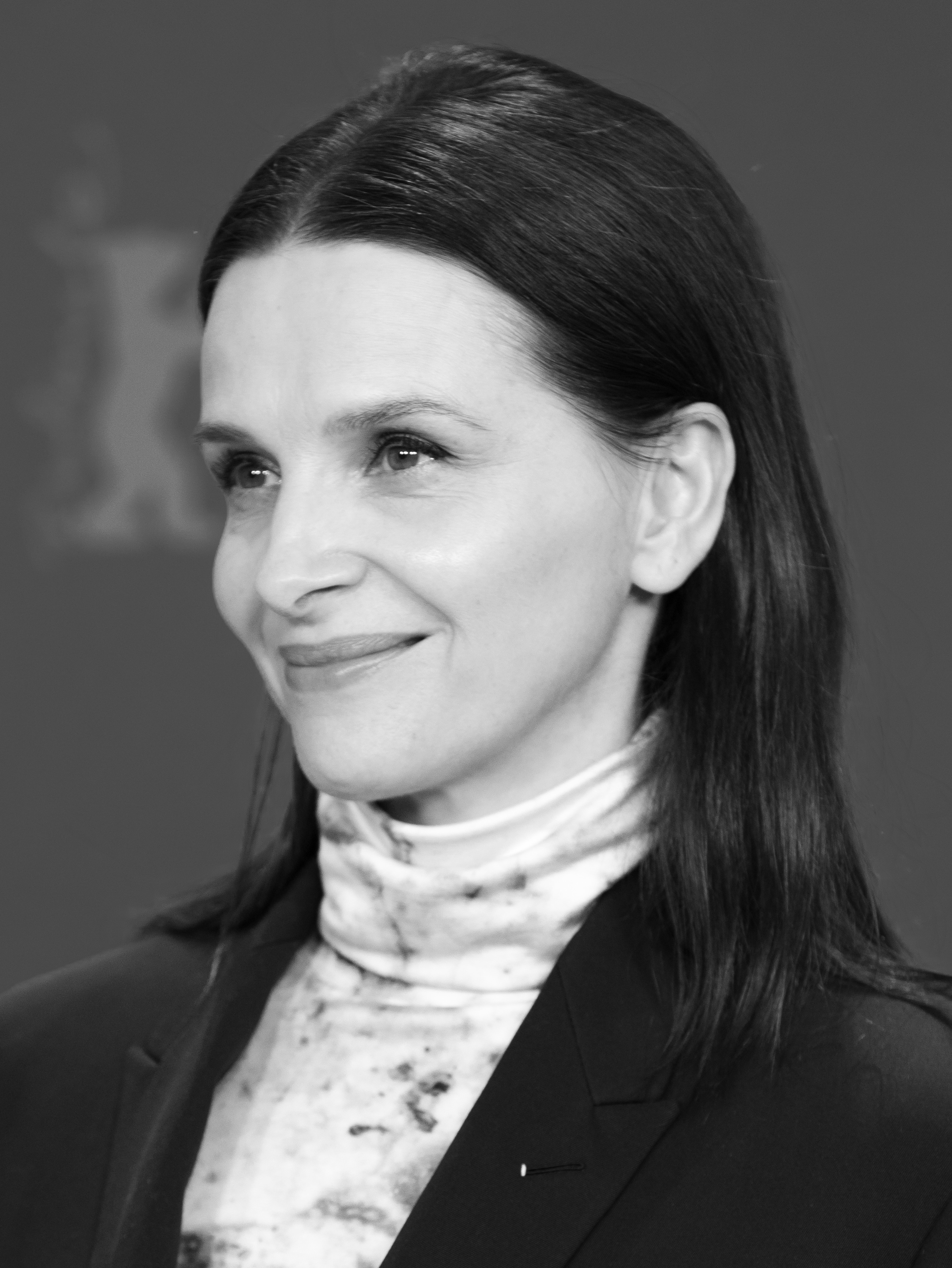
Juliette Binoche

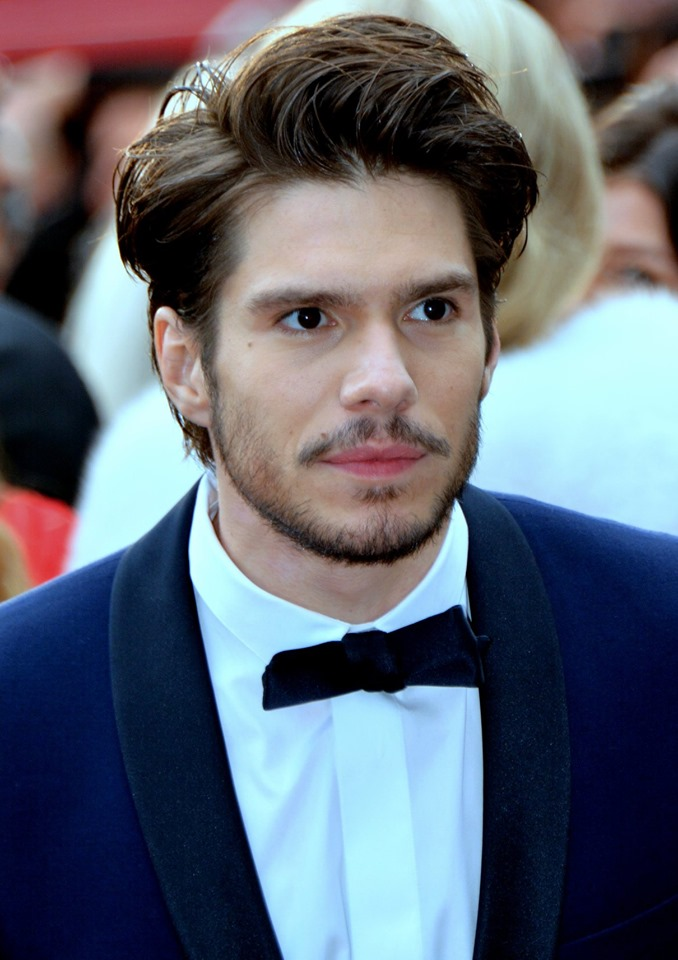
François Civil

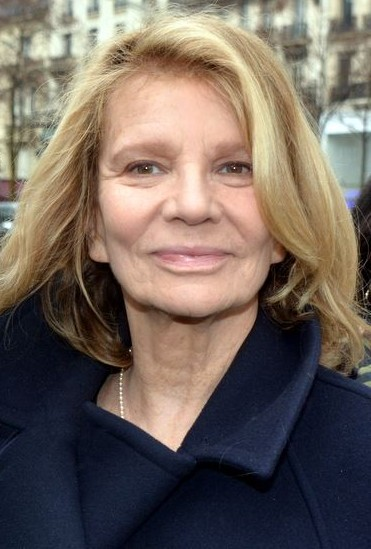
Nicole Garcia

== Release ==
Who You Think I Am had its world premiere at the 69th Berlin International Film Festival on 10 February 2019. The film was released theatrically in France on 27 February 2019 by Diaphana Distribution and in Belgium on 6 March 2019 by Cinéart.

== Reception ==
On the review aggregator website Rotten Tomatoes, the film holds an approval rating of 86% based on 65 critics, with an average rating of 7/10. The website's critics consensus reads, "Who You Think I Am bites off more plot than some viewers will be able to chew, but its narrative entanglements are more than offset by Juliette Binoche's central performance."

Pat Padua of The Washington Post called the film "thoroughly entertaining", while Claudia Puig from KPCC's FilmWeek called it "thought-provoking".

Manohla Dargis of The New York Times praised the role of Claire Millaud by Juliette Binoche, writing that "[She]... fluidly navigates all the narrative switchbacks and emotional storms, enough that you may not mind the pileup of strained developments and coincidences".

Writing for the Los Angeles Times, Roxana Hadadi suggested that the film "Vacillates between high-minded and tawdry", "result[ing] in an engaging mashup of psychological drama and social media thriller".

Guy Lodge of Variety wrote that "Safy Nebbou tucks bittersweet human observations between unabashedly outlandish twists".

Reviewing the film at the 69th Berlin International Film Festival, Neil Young of The Hollywood Reporter called the film a "Catfish a la Francaise: Conventional-looking dish yields surprisingly sharp flavors".

In the United Kingdom, the film was praised by The Times, whose Kevin Maher said "I've seen it twice and it's even better the second time". The Daily Telegraph, called Who You Think I Am "a kind of illicit thrill". Peter Bradshaw of The Guardian, "Binoche's performance and the movie are elegant, ingenious and sexy".

The criticism of the film internationally was also positive. Sandra Hall of The Sydney Morning Herald called the film "flawed", but "has an elegant morality tale about the dangers and temptations of the virtual life".
