= Under a Dark Sun =

2025 French mystery TV series

- Soleil noir (French)
- Genre: Mystery; Thriller
- Created by: Nils-Antoine Sambuc
- Directed by: Marie Jardillier; Edouard Salier
- Starring: Isabelle Adjani; Ava Baya; Guillaume Gouix; Thibault de Montalembert
- Country of origin: France
- Original language: French
- No. of episodes: 6

Production
- Running time: 45–52 minutes
- Production companies: Itinéraire Productions; Plaza Mayor Company; UGC Fiction

Original release
- Network: Netflix
- Release: July 9, 2025

Under a Dark Sun (Soleil noir) is a French mystery thriller television miniseries created by Nils-Antoine Sambuc. The series stars Isabelle Adjani and Ava Baya. All six episodes were released globally on Netflix on July 9, 2025. Set in Provence, the plot follows a seasonal worker who becomes the prime suspect in the murder of a wealthy estate owner.

== Plot ==
Alba is a young mother who flees her past to take a seasonal job at the Lasserre family's prestigious flower farm in Provence. Shortly after her arrival, the family patriarch, Arnaud Lasserre, is found murdered. Alba becomes the primary suspect in the investigation.

As the police probe more deeply, it is revealed that Arnaud had recently altered his will to leave his entire estate to Alba. The discovery that Alba is Arnaud's illegitimate daughter fuels the hostility of the Lasserre matriarch, Béatrice. Alba must prove her innocence while navigating the dangerous secrets of the Lasserre dynasty.

== Cast and characters ==
- Isabelle Adjani as Béatrice Lasserre
- Ava Baya as Alba Mazier
- Guillaume Gouix as Mathieu Lasserre
- Thibault de Montalembert as Arnaud Lasserre
- Louise Coldefy as Lucie
- Claire Romain as Manon
- Simon Ehrlacher as Valentin
- Max Harter as Léo

== Production ==
The series was produced by Itinéraire Productions in association with Plaza Mayor Company and UGC Fiction. Nils-Antoine Sambuc served as the lead writer. Direction for the first four episodes was handled by Marie Jardillier, while Edouard Salier directed the final two episodes. Filming took place on location in the Provence-Alpes-Côte d'Azur region of France.

== Release ==
The series premiered on Netflix on July 9, 2025. Upon release, it reached the top 10 most-watched programs on the platform in over 40 countries.

== Reception ==
The series received mixed reviews from critics. Reviewers from Decider gave the show a "Stream It" recommendation, noting that while the mystery was "pedestrian," the show had "just enough thrills" and "fun-to-watch performances by Baya and Adjani" to make it worth a viewer's time. Conversely, a review for Mid-Day was more critical, describing it as a "frenzied drama" where "hollow thrills alone are not enough" and noting that the "numerous twists and turns" eventually became "tedious and irritating."
