= Hidden Kisses =

- Directed by: Didier Bivel
- Starring: Bérenger Anceaux; Jules Houplain
- Country of origin: France
- Original language: French

Production
- Running time: 87 minutes

Original release
- Release: 4 February 2016

Hidden Kisses (French: Baisers cachés) is a 2016 French television film directed by Didier Bivel about the coming out process of two gay teenagers.

== Plot ==
Teenager Nathan and his single father Stéphane drive cross-town to their new apartment, due to Nathan's transferral to another school mid-term. Nathan's dad is a policeman and does not want a gay son. Their once close relationship grows cold and distant after Stéphane learns Nathan is gay. However, Stéphane later finds a beaten Nathan in his room, crying. Stéphane realizes he was wrong and begins to support his son, and comforts him by repeating, “I’m here.” Nathan is insecure and expresses concern about his openness with his homosexuality. His father encourages him to be himself and not care what people say.

At a school party, Nathan kisses a boy, Louis, after meeting up in secret, but someone manages to take a picture of them and shares it. The news spreads quickly among the other students and soon the entire school is aware and bullies Nathan. None of the students realize the other boy is Louis in the photo because of the angle the photo was taken and it being dark. Tristan, an English teacher at the school, notices Nathan being bullied and pleads with his Math teacher who is a closeted lesbian, Catherine, to offer him advice, but she refuses. Nathan then meets up once again with Louis. Although Nathan wants them to be together, Louis rejects him and expresses regret. Louis claims he's not gay. He angrily leaves and heads home, where he spends time tanning in the pool with his girlfriend, Laura.

In P.E. class, Nathan gets beaten up in front of Louis. Rather than helping Nathan, Louis attacks him as well. Louis and Laura later discuss Nathan while laying together, only for Laura to reveal that she was the one who took the picture, wanting to invoke a reaction in her boyfriend. Louis denies being gay and accuses Nathan of pushing him into doing this. During a Math lesson, Catherine notices Nathan's wounds and demands to learn what happened. She then tells a story about a girl who preferred other girls and was bullied for it. At the end of the school day, Catherine is picked up by her girlfriend and the two kiss in front of the students. This inspires Nathan to stand up to his bullies and kiss Louis in front of everyone as well, but gets bitterly rejected once again.

Louis' mother, Corinne, uses her son's laptop after having hardware issues but discovers he watches gay pornography. She and her husband Bruno punish Louis when he comes back by taking away his phone and computer and refuse to let him go to school for the next few days. Meanwhile, Catherine and Tristan plead with the principal to protect Nathan and every LGBT student at the school, but to no avail. A few days later, Louis apologizes to his parents and promises that he isn't gay. When they decide to give his phone back, they discover he is once again lying to them and decide to ignore him from now on.

Louis runs away and meets up with Laura, who learns why he hasn't been responding to her texts. She runs away heartbroken after Louis only asks her for money, wanting to leave his house and parents forever. However, Laura tells Nathan and he along with his father go on a search for Louis, who is now contemplating suicide on a rooftop. They find and rescue him and the two reunited teenagers embrace. At Stéphane's apartment, Louis stays up late at night but falls asleep when Nathan invites him to lay together.

The next day Stéphane calls Louis' parents and his father comes to pick him up. Stéphane tries to talk with Louis' father about what happened, but he becomes agitated and demands for Louis to come to him immediately. Louis and his father leave after Louis reassures Nathan that he will be alright.

When Louis arrives home his father locks him in his room. He tells his wife she has to trust him; however she seems unsure about the way they are treating Louis. After discovering a set of photos of Louis and his little brother she decides to break open Louis' door. She apologizes for locking him up and leaves with Louis and her youngest son.

Louis' mother enters his father's clinic and waits to see him. When he exits his office she tells him they need to speak immediately. She tells him he can't keep punishing Louis because of who he is; however, his father gets angry and says he was only protecting Louis, because he cares for him. He says Louis tried to commit suicide because he is gay. She corrects him by saying he did it because they didn't accept Louis and thought he was abnormal. She continues by saying they are the ones that need to change, not Louis. She tells him she doesn't know who her husband is anymore and is leaving him.

Louis, his brother and mother move into a new house. However, he has to transfer schools to be closer to home. Louis remains in contact with Laura and reassures her they will see each other at his next boxing match. Soon after, Nathan and Laura go to the train station together to pick Louis up for his upcoming boxing match. Nathan apologizes to Laura for the kiss. She reassures him she is not angry with him. Louis arrives and shares a kiss with Nathan. A passerby comments on their kiss but Laura tells them how beautiful the boys are together.

Everyone is present at Louis' boxing match, except for his father. Louis decides at the last moment he doesn't want to participate. Stéphane talks to him, asking him if he only likes boxing because of his father or because he actually likes it himself. Whatever the answer, if he quits it must be with no regrets. Louis decides he will box. The first round goes poorly with Louis' opponent winning. His father then shows up. Seeing him gives Louis the encouragement to beat his opponent; however, Louis' father leaves before the match is over.

After the match Louis sprints to his father's car. He tells him his progress is because of his father. And asks him to stay and celebrate with the rest of his friends. He asks him if he is proud. His father remains silent the whole time. He drives off before saying anything, leaving an upset Louis behind. Stéphane finds Louis and comforts him saying his father needs some more time. He tells him everyone is waiting for him to celebrate.

== Cast ==
- Bérenger Anceaux as Nathan
- Jules Houplain as Louis
- Patrick Timsit as Stéphane
- Barbara Schulz as Corinne
- Bruno Putzulu as Bruno
- Catherine Jacob as Catherine
- Lisa Kramarz as Laura

== Awards ==
- Prix de la critique Isabelle Nataf : Baisers cachés de Didier Bivel (France 2)
