= Louise Coldefy =

French actress (born 1987)

- Coldefy in 2026
- Born: 16 May 1987 (age 39); Paris, France
- Education: Cours Florent; Conservatoire national
- Occupation: Actress
- Known for: Yes vous aime; Family Business

Louise Coldefy (born 16 May 1987 in Paris) is a French actress.

== Biography ==
Coldefy attended primary school in Suresnes, a suburb of Paris. She was enthusiastic about acting from a young age and took part in minor theater performances, among other activities. She studied drama at the Conservatoire national from 1996 until 2003 and subsequently the private drama school Cours Florent. After meeting French talent agent Jean-Baptiste L'Herron, she began doing castings for films and television. Her first small role was in the drama Superstar, directed by Xavier Giannoli. She was a member of the comedy troupe Yes vous aime between 2012 and 2016.

Coldefy landed her first major role in 2015 in Arnaud Viard's production Arnaud fait son deuxième film.

The actress gained some international prominence in the 2019 comedy series Family Business, where she plays the eccentric girlfriend of Olivier.

== Filmography ==
=== Film ===
List of film appearances, with year, title, and role shown
Year	Title	Role	Notes
2012	Superstar	Journalist	
2012	La Vie domestique	Mia	
2014	Paris Follies	Restaurant server	
2015	Arnaud fait son deuxième film	Gabrielle Ducorail	
2015	Love at First Child	Élodie	
2016	Five	Emilie	
2016	Trainee Day	Airport restaurant server	
2017	Loue-moi!	Audrey	
2017	Sales Gosses	Yasmine	
2018	Le Gendre de ma vie	Gabrielle	
2020	Les Apparences	Journalist	
2026	Redemptions		

=== Television ===
List of television appearances, with year, title, and role shown
Year	Title	Role	Notes
2011	Kaboul Kitchen	Constance	
2012	Détectives	Émilie	1 episode
2016	Il revient quand Bertrand?	Magalie	web series
2018	Call My Agent!	Louise Galois	1 episode
2019–2020	Family Business	Clémentine Cendron	12 episodes
2020	Inhuman Resources	Mathilde Delambre	6 episodes
2024	Fiasco		TV series
2025	Under a Dark Sun	Lucie	TV series
