= Trainee Day =

2016 film by Marc Fitoussi

- Film poster
- Maman a tort
- Directed by: Marc Fitoussi
- Written by: Marc Fitoussi
- Produced by: Caroline Bonmarchand; Jacques-Henri Bronckart; Olivier Bronckart
- Starring: Émilie Dequenne; Jeanne Jestin
- Cinematography: Laurent Brunet
- Edited by: Damien Keyeux
- Production company: Avenue B Productions
- Distributed by: SND Films (France); O'Brother Distribution (Belgium)
- Release dates: 24 August 2016 (Angoulême); 9 November 2016 (France); 23 November 2016 (Belgium)
- Running time: 110 minutes
- Countries: France; Belgium
- Language: French
- Budget: $4.4 million
- Box office: $232.000

Trainee Day (original title: Maman a tort) is a 2016 French-Belgian comedy-drama film written and directed by Marc Fitoussi. It stars Émilie Dequenne and Jeanne Jestin.

== Plot ==
A 14-year-old discovers a different side of her mother and the workings of the corporate world when she interns at her mother's insurance workplace.

== Cast ==
- Jeanne Jestin as Anouk
- Émilie Dequenne as Cyrielle
- Nelly Antignac as Bénédicte
- Camille Chamoux as Mathilde
- Annie Grégorio as Simone
- Sabrina Ouazani as Nadia Choukri
- Jean-François Cayrey as Blanchard
- Grégoire Ludig as The father
- Joshua Mazé as Émile
- Stéphane Bissot as Perrine
- Laetitia Spigarelli as Constance
- Lucie Fagedet as Clarisse
- Louise Coldefy as airport restaurant server
