= House of Lust =

- Directed by: Anissa Bonnefont
- Screenplay by: Anissa Bonnefont; Diastème
- Produced by: Clément Miserez; Matthieu Warter; David Giordano
- Starring: Ana Girardot
- Cinematography: Yann Maritaud
- Edited by: Maxime Pozzi-Garcia
- Music by: Herman Dune
- Release date: 2022
- Language: French

House of Lust (French: La Maison), also known as The House, is a 2022 erotic drama film co-written and directed by Anissa Bonnefont and starring Ana Girardot.

== Plot ==
Emma, a young writer seeking inspiration, decides to work in a Berlin brothel to gather material for a novel about the relationships between sex workers and their clients.

== Cast ==
- Ana Girardot as Emma
- Aure Atika as Delilah
- Rossy de Palma as Brigida
- Gina Jimenez as Madeleine
- Yannick Renier as Stéphane
- Lucas Englander as Ian
- Nikita Bellucci as Hildie
- Philippe Rebbot as the Frenchman
- Loriane Klupsch as Lorna
- Irma as Margaret
- John Robinson as Mark
- Carole Weyers as Dorothée
- Ruth Becquart as la dame
- Wim Willaert as the doctor
- Alexis Van Stratum as Boris

== Production ==
The film is based on the autobiographical novel La Maison by Emma Becker. It was produced by Radar Films, in association with Umedia and Rezo Films.

== Release ==
The film premiered at the Saint-Jean-de-Luz International Film Festival. It was released in French cinemas on 16 October 2022.
