= In a Rush =

- Film poster
- French: Au galop
- Directed by: Louis-Do de Lencquesaing
- Written by: Louis-Do de Lencquesaing
- Produced by: Gaelle Bayssiere; Didier Creste
- Starring: Louis-Do de Lencquesaing; Alice de Lencquesaing; Valentina Cervi; Marthe Keller; Xavier Beauvois
- Cinematography: Jean-René Duveau
- Edited by: Marion Monnier
- Music by: Emmanuel Deruty
- Distributed by: Pyramide Distribution
- Release dates: 19 May 2012 (Cannes); 17 October 2012 (France)
- Running time: 93 minutes
- Country: France
- Language: French
- Budget: $2.2 million
- Box office: $251,755

In a Rush (French: Au galop) is a 2012 French comedy-drama film written, directed by and starring Louis-Do de Lencquesaing. It was screened in the Critics' Week section at the 2012 Cannes Film Festival.

== Plot ==
Ada is in a relationship, with a child, about to get married, when she meets Paul, a single man with a daughter and an overbearing mother. His father dies.

== Cast ==
- Louis-Do de Lencquesaing as Paul Bastherlain
- Marthe Keller as Mina
- Valentina Cervi as Ada
- Alice de Lencquesaing as Camille
- Bernard Verley as BonP
- Xavier Beauvois as François
- Laurent Capelluto as Christian
- Ralph Amoussou as Louis
- Emola Romo-Renoir as Zoé
- Denis Podalydès as The editor
- André Marcon as The financial advisor
- George Aguilar as The taxi driver

== Critical response ==
Variety compared it to "a sad soap, only with literary ambitions and more nudity". The Hollywood Reporter suggested that first-time director Louis-Do de Lencquesaing should stick to being an actor: "one gets the impression here that his talent is best expressed on the other side of the lens."
