= Feu (album) =

2015 studio album by Nekfeu

Studio album by Nekfeu
- Released: 8 June 2015
- Genre: French hip hop
- Length: 79:18; 142:34 (re-release)
- Language: French
- Label: Seine Zoo; Polydor; Universal
- Producer: BLV; DJ Elite; Nekfeu; The ThundaCatz

Nekfeu chronology
Paris Sud Minute (2013)	Feu (2015)	Destins liés (2016)

Singles from Feu
- 1. "Égérie" Released: 3 April 2015; 2. "On verra" Released: 1 May 2015; 3. "Nique les clones, Pt. II" Released: 25 May 2015; 4. "Tempête" Released: 1 June 2015

Feu (Réédition)
- Re-release cover

Feu (French for 'Fire') is the debut studio album by French hip hop artist Nekfeu. It was released on 8 June 2015 by Seine Zoo, Polydor Records and Universal Music Group in France. A re-release of the album, entitled Feu (Réédition), was released on 4 December 2015.

Entering (and peaking) the French Albums Chart at number 3 in its first week, the album was certified gold in its third week with over 47,000 copies sold. The album was later certified platinum in November 2015 and diamond in October 2017.

== Release ==
Feu has produced 4 singles:

- "Égérie" was released as the album's lead single on 3 April 2015. It peaked at number 49 on the French Singles Chart.
- "On verra" was released as the album's second single on 1 May 2015. It peaked at number 13 on the French Singles Chart, and at number 12 on the Belgian Ultratop 50 chart in Wallonia.
- "Nique les clones, Pt. II" was released as the album's third single on 25 May 2015. It peaked at number 57 on the French Singles Chart.
- "Tempête" was released as the album's fourth single on 1 June 2015. It peaked at number 21 on the French Singles Chart.

The song "Ma dope" entered the French Singles Chart at number 125 on 20 June 2015, peaking at number 74. A music video for the song was released on YouTube on 8 September 2015.

The song "Princesse" (French for 'Princess') broke into the French Singles Chart at number 172 on 20 June 2015, peaking at that same position.

== Reception ==
=== Critical reception and accolades ===
Professional ratings
Review scores
Source	Rating
Goûte mes disques	6/10
Music Story	3.5/5 stars
Sens Critique	5.6/10
The Web Tape	3.5/5 stars
2K Music	7/10 stars

Feu received generally positive reviews from music critics. Grégory Curot of Ça Parle Hip-Hop wrote that the album had "a certain beauty, alive and sincere, without faff." Clément B. of Melty was pleased with the musical composition of the album, saying, "Out with the mechanical flows on the old boom-bap instrumentals. Even if he [Nekfeu] maintains this science of rhyme which fits perfectly, it is still in total harmony with the instrumental. The result? Unique tracks." Romuald Ollivier of Music Story commented that Nekfeu "carves rich texts, plays with language, words, works the form to serve the content." Julie Green and Eymeric Macouillard of SURL also gave a positive review, calling the album "friendly, incisive at times although a bit too controlled and punctuated by some sweet follies, Feu is indeed the album of a generation." Franckie Small of Baskets Blanches had a lot of positive comments on the album: "Before the release of the singles "Égérie", "Nique les clones, Pt. II" and "Tempête", I clearly neglected the arrival of Feu. Quickly though, I understood that the title of the album wasn't really chosen at random. ... Nekfeu shows the extent of his talent on this album."

I like it! I like the feel of it! If I could understand it, that would be even more [of a] plus, but the feel is there and the flow is there, the cadence is there, that's a trip ... I don't know the language but I can still feel it. That's a trip.

—American rapper Kendrick Lamar in an interview with Skyrock on 8 June 2015, after listening to a part of "On verra".

Costa of Le Bon Son gave a mixed to positive review of the album, writing, "We then note that one of the album's recurring themes is one on which it is extremely difficult not be simple: love. How can one talk about romantic relationships without repeating what has been said by hundreds of other artists of all the different genres?" However, he continued to write that "fortunately, love as it is treated in this album is not limited to romantic relationships, but goes into friendships and family relationships. ... We'll conclude after listening that although he's made it, Nekfeu remains genuine."

Goûte mes disques gave the album a largely negative review: "The first thing you notice in this record is its length: nearly an hour and a half. Consistency is appropriate and catchy headlines aren't lacking ... However, it remains an unpleasant impression, already present when listening to the albums of his [Nekfeu's] different groups: this consistency is accompanied by a form of monotony." They concluded by writing, "Feu isn't awful. But why doesn't the rapper aspire to excellence? Overthought and overworked, this album lacks spontaneity, vigour, the very ones that so pleased in the beginnings of the rapper, who had shown some talent."

On 12 February 2016, Feu won the Victoire de la Musique award for Urban Music Album of the Year.

=== Commercial performance ===
"Ma dope"

"Princesse"

Feu entered the French iTunes Chart at number one on 11 May 2015, 28 days before its release, and remained at number one until 17 May before returning to the top of the chart on 6 June, 2 days before its release, and remaining there for 3 weeks, its longest period at number one to date. As of 29 August 2015, the album has spent 51 days at number one on the chart in total.

Selling 18,844 copies in its first week, Feu had the highest number of first-week digital sales in history for a French debut studio album. The album ended up with a total of 35,944 copies sold in its first week. The album was certified gold by the SNEP in its third week with over 47,065 copies sold. On 21 November 2015, Nekfeu announced on Instagram that Feu was certified platinum; news he was apparently given about 2 months prior to the announcement. On 31 March 2016, it was announced that Feu was certified gold in Belgium, selling over 15,000 copies.

On 4 October 2017 Feu was certified diamond in France with over 500,000 copies sold, making Nekfeu the fourth French hip hop act to receive the certification after IAM, Sexion d'Assaut and one of its members, Maître Gims.

== Track listing ==
No.	Title	Writer(s)	Producer(s)	Length
1.	"Martin Eden"	Ken Samaras; Hugz Hefner	Nekfeu; DJ Elite	4:55
2.	"Mon âme" (featuring Sneazzy)	Samaras; Ludovic Reclus; Mohamed Amine	Nekfeu; DJ Elite	4:26
3.	"Le horla"	Samaras; Matthieu Lalia	Nekfeu; DJ Elite	3:40
4.	"Nique les clones, Pt. II"	Samaras; Enzo Serra	Nekfeu; DJ Elite	3:44
5.	"Rêve d'avoir des rêves"	Samaras; Clement Loubens	Nekfeu; DJ Elite	4:57
6.	"Tempête"	Samaras; Hugz Hefner	Nekfeu; DJ Elite	3:18
7.	"Égérie"	Samaras; Hugz Hefner	Nekfeu; DJ Elite	3:30
8.	"Reuf" (featuring Ed Sheeran)	Samaras; Pierrick Devin; Gabriel Legeleux; Ed Sheeran	Nekfeu; DJ Elite	5:27
9.	"La moue des morts" (featuring S-Crew)	Samaras; Louis Courtine; Framal; Théo Lellouche; Mekra	Nekfeu; DJ Elite	4:32
10.	"Laisse aller"	Samaras; Richie Beats	Nekfeu; DJ Elite	4:34
11.	"On verra"	Samaras; Benjamin Seletti	BLV	3:31
12.	"Ma dope" (featuring S.Pri Noir)	Samaras; Romain Chaillol; Kohôme Kordiko; Xavier Mendes	Nekfeu; DJ Elite	3:47
13.	"Jeux d'ombres" (featuring Doum's and Amber-Simone)	Samaras; Mamadou Coulibali; Amber Simone McNeil; Steven Vidal	Nekfeu; DJ Elite	3:49
14.	"Elle en avait envie"	Samaras; Vidal	Nekfeu; DJ Elite	3:27
15.	"Princesse" (featuring Nemir)	Samaras; Nemir Mohamed; Serra	Nekfeu; DJ Elite	4:26
16.	"Risibles amours"	Samaras; Courtine; Loubens	Nekfeu; DJ Elite	8:46
17.	"Point d'interrogation" (featuring Alpha Wann)	Samaras; Courtine; Alpha Wann	Nekfeu; DJ Elite	3:39
18.	"Être humain" (featuring Amber-Simone)	Samaras; Marwan El-Bergamy; McNeil; M.Moore	The ThundaCatz	4:50
Total length:				79:18

iTunes bonus track
No.	Title	Producer(s)	Length
19.	"Nek le fenek"	Nekfeu; DJ Elite	3:08

Fnac bonus track
No.	Title	Producer(s)	Length
19.	"Au cœur du G"	Nekfeu; DJ Elite	4:10

Feu (Réédition) – CD 2
No.	Title	Producer(s)	Length
1.	"7:77 AM" (featuring 86 Joon)		3:53
2.	"Plume"		3:53
3.	"La ballade du Fremont" (featuring Doum's)		3:54
4.	"Question d'honneur" (featuring S-Crew)		3:22
5.	"Deux-trois" (featuring 1995)		4:12
6.	"Les bruits de ma ville" (featuring Phénomène Bizness)		4:28
7.	"Pars avec moi" (featuring 1995)		3:42
8.	"Mal aimé"		3:51
9.	"Le horla" (instrumental)	Nekfeu; DJ Elite	3:37
10.	"Martin Eden" (instrumental)	Nekfeu; DJ Elite	4:08
11.	"Nique les clones, Pt. II" (instrumental)	Nekfeu; DJ Elite	3:42
12.	"Égérie" (instrumental)	Nekfeu; DJ Elite	3:31
13.	"Reuf" (instrumental)	Nekfeu; DJ Elite	3:53
14.	"On verra" (instrumental)	Nekfeu; DJ Elite	5:24
15.	"Ma dope" (instrumental)	Nekfeu; DJ Elite	3:53
16.	"7:77 AM" (instrumental)		3:53
Total length:			63:16

Notes

- "Risibles amours" contains a hidden track entitled "Des astres", produced by Hologram Lo'.

== Charts ==
=== Weekly charts ===
Chart (2015)	Peak position
Belgian Albums (Ultratop Flanders)	65
Belgian Albums (Ultratop Wallonia)	2
French Albums (SNEP)	3
Swiss Albums (Schweizer Hitparade)	5

=== Year-end charts ===
Chart (2015)	Position
Belgian Albums (Ultratop Wallonia)	28
French Albums (SNEP)	21
Chart (2016)	Position
Belgian Albums (Ultratop Wallonia)	69
French Albums (SNEP)	29
Chart (2019)	Position
Belgian Albums (Ultratop Wallonia)	115
Chart (2020)	Position
Belgian Albums (Ultratop Wallonia)	71
Chart (2021)	Position
Belgian Albums (Ultratop Wallonia)	56

== Singles charts ==
"Ma dope"
Chart (2015)	Peak position
France (SNEP)	74

"Princesse"
Chart (2015)	Peak position
France (SNEP)	172

== Certifications ==
Region	Certification	Certified units/sales
France (SNEP)	Diamond	500,000^{‡}
^{‡} Sales+streaming figures based on certification alone.

== Release history ==
Country	Date	Format	Label
France	June 8, 2015	CD; LP; digital download	Seine Zoo; Polydor; Universal
United States	June 16, 2015	CD; digital download	Seine Zoo; Polydor; Universal
