= Alice de Lencquesaing =

French actress (born 1991)

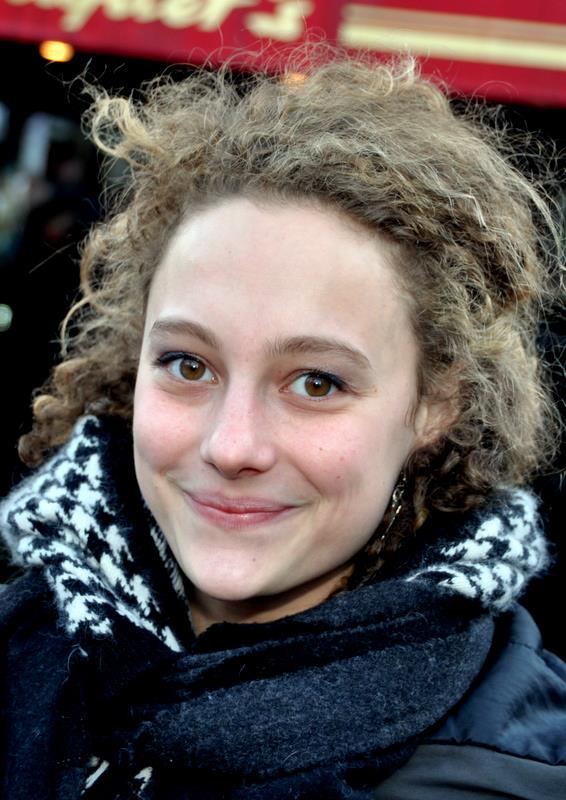
- Lencquesaing in 2013
- Born: 11 August 1991 (age 35); Paris, France
- Occupation: Actress
- Years active: 2003–present
- Parents: Louis-Do de Lencquesaing (father); Caroline Champetier (mother)

Alice de Lencquesaing (French: [alis də lɑ̃kzɛ̃]; born 11 August 1991) is a French actress.

== Personal life ==
Lencquesaing is the daughter of cinematographer Caroline Champetier and actor Louis-Do de Lencquesaing.

== Career ==
She made her film debut with a small role in Céline Sciamma's film Water Lilies (2007), before appearing in Olivier Assayas' Summer Hours (2008) and Mia Hansen-Løve's Father of My Children (2009). Lencquesaing received a nomination for the César Award for Most Promising Actress for In a Rush (2012) and a nomination for the Lumière Award for Best Female Revelation for Headfirst (also 2012).

== Filmography ==
Year	Title	Role	Notes
2003	Petites coupures		
2006	La Dérive des continents	Lola	TV film
2007	Water Lilies	Girl in locker room	
2008	Summer Hours	Sylvie	
2009	Father of My Children	Clémence Canvel	Cabourg Film Festival - Prix Premiers Rendez-vous
2009	Même pas en rêve	The girl	Short film
2011	Polisse	Sandra	
2011	Voir la Picardie et mourir		Short film
2011	Libre Jeu	Alice	Short film
2012	In a Rush	Camille Bastherlain	Nominated — César Award for Most Promising Actress
2012	Headfirst	Zoé	Nominated — Lumière Award for Best Female Revelation
2012	Novembre	Camille	Short film
2012	Disparition		Short film
2012	Les Éphémères	Amandine	Short film
2013	The Nun	Sister Ursule	
2013	Zoo	Émilie Teziev	Short film
2014	Bodybuilder	Lucie	
2014	Tokyo Fiancée	Yasmine	
2014	Next Time I'll Aim for the Heart	Melissa	
2014	L'orée		Short film
2014	Subordonnés		Short film
2014	Le Cœur net	Claire	Short film
2014	Le Zoo de Monsieur Vanel	Marthe	Short film
2014	Ceux qui dansent sur la tête	Emilie	TV movie
2015	The Crew	Audrey	
2015	The Art Dealer	Jeanne	
2015	Marguerite & Julien	Nicole	
2015	Love at First Child	Claire	
2015	Marion	The girl	Short film
2015	La Course	Martine	Short film
2015	Kiss Me Not	The coach	Short film
2015	Lieu trouble	Sam	Short film
2015	26 amis en commun	Amandine	Short film
2015	Résurgence commode	Virginie	Short film
2015	Marjorie	Virginie	TV series (1 episode)
2016	Frantz	Fanny	
2016	Chocolat	Camille	
2016	A Wedding	Aurore	
2016	Heal the Living	Alice Harfang	
2016	Humaine		Short film
2016	L'Anémone et l’Ancolie	The girl	Short film
2017	Corporate	Sophie	
2017	Thirst Street	Sophie	
2017	Drôle de père	Alice	
2017	Just to Be Sure	Juliette Gourmelon	
2017	Endangered Species	Mélanie Lamblin	
2017	Nos enfants	The baby-sitter	Short film
2018	Edmond	Rosemonde Gérard	
2018	Looking for Rohmner (寻找罗麦, Xun zhao Luo Mai)		
2018	Les grands squelettes		
2018	Libre	Claire	Short film
2018	Lâchez les chiens	Annouck	Short film
2018	L'émeute qui vient	Alice	Short film
2018	Le grand orchestre	The young girl	Short film
2019	Courir toute nue dans l'univers		Short film
2020	Chacun chez soi	Anna	
2020	Jesus 2020	Claire	Short film
2020	Inhuman Resources	Lucie Delambre	TV Mini-Series
2021	Années 20	Julie	
2021	Happening	Laëtitia	
2021	César Wagner	Sybille Wagner	Episode: "Un Doigt de Mystère"
2021	Capitaine Marleau	Lucie	Episode: "La Der des Der"
2025	It Takes Two to Tango	Constance, Victoire's daughter	Jean-Pierre Améris
2026	De Gaulle	Suzanne Torrès	

== Theatre ==
Year	Title	Role	Director	Location
2011	Harper Regan	Sarah Regan	Lukas Hemleb	Maison de la Culture d'Amiens; Théâtre du Rond-Point
2013	Saraband	Karin	Jean-Claude Amyl	Lucernaire
