= Made in France (film) =

- Film poster
- Directed by: Nicolas Boukhrief
- Written by: Éric Besnard; Nicolas Boukhrief
- Produced by: Clément Miserez; Matthieu Warter
- Starring: Malik Zidi; Dimitri Storoge; François Civil; Nassim Si Ahmed; Ahmed Dramé
- Cinematography: Patrick Ghiringhelli
- Edited by: Lydia Decobert
- Music by: Robin Coudert
- Production companies: Radar Films; Pretty Pictures
- Distributed by: Pretty Pictures
- Release dates: 4 October 2015 (Busan); 27 October 2015 (France)
- Running time: 89 minutes
- Country: France
- Language: French

Made in France (working title: L'Enquête) is a 2015 French thriller crime drama film directed by Nicolas Boukhrief and co-written by Boukhrief with Éric Besnard. Filming began on 25 August 2014 in Paris, and wrapped on 3 October 2014. The film had its premiere at the 20th Busan International Film Festival in October 2015.

== Plot ==
Sam, a freelance journalist, decides to investigate the growing phenomenon of disaffected youth joining extremist groups. He infiltrates a group of four young people who have been tasked with the creation of a jihadist cell and whose mission is to destabilise the city centre of Paris.

== Cast ==
- Malik Zidi as Sam
- Dimitri Storoge as Hassan
- François Civil as Christophe
- Nassim Si Ahmed as Driss
- Ahmed Dramé as Sidi
- Franck Gastambide as Dubreuil
- Judith Davis as Laure
- Nailia Harzoune as Zora
- Nicolas Grandhomme as Herbelin
- Assaad Bouab as the imam
- Malek Oudjail as Ahmed
- Laurent Alexandre as the tattooed man

== Release ==
The film was initially set for release in early 2015. However, the original distributor SND Films exited the project after the January 2015 Île-de-France attacks, apparently due to the sensitivity of the subject matter. The rights to the film were then acquired by Pretty Pictures.

The release was delayed to 18 November 2015; however following the Paris attacks on 13 November 2015, Pretty Pictures withdrew the promotional campaign and delayed release again. The film was released on video-on-demand on TF1 on 29 January 2016.

The postponement made international news. It was reported in the United States SA (e.p. Los Angeles Times, Time, Daily News, The Washington Examiner), Australia (e.p. SBS, News.com.au), Great Britain (e.p.The Guardian, The Daily Telegraph), Germany (e.p.Stern, Handelsblatt, Focus, Der Tagesspiegel), Italy (e.p. The Huffington Post and Il Foglio) and other countries all over the world.
