= Tempête (song) =

Single by Nekfeu

from the album Feu
- Released: 1 June 2015
- Recorded: 2015
- Genre: French hip hop
- Length: 3:17
- Label: Seine Zoo; Polydor; Universal
- Songwriters: Ken Samaras; Hugz Hefner
- Producers: Nekfeu; DJ Elite

Nekfeu singles chronology
"Nique les clones, Pt. II" (2015)	"Tempête" (2015)	"7:77 AM" (2015)

Audio sample
- "Tempête": file; help

Music video
- "Tempête" on YouTube

"Tempête" (French for 'Storm') is a song by French hip hop artist Nekfeu, produced by himself and DJ Elite. It was released on June 1, 2015 as the fourth single from his debut studio album Feu.

The song entered the French Singles Chart at number 21 on June 13, 2015, where it since peaked.

== Music video ==
A music video for the song was published on YouTube on June 1, 2015. It was directed by Felix Perreault, Xavier Menard Carrignant, Philémon Crête and Léa Dumoulin.

== Track listing ==
- Digital download
1. "Tempête" – 3:17

== Chart performance ==
Chart (2015)	Peak position
France (SNEP)	21
