= Reuf (song) =

- Front cover for the Five version

Song by Nekfeu featuring Ed Sheeran

from the album Feu
- Released: 8 June 2015
- Length: 5:27
- Label: Seine Zoo; Polydor; Universal
- Songwriters: Ken Samaras; Pierrick Devin; Gabriel Legeleux; Ed Sheeran
- Producers: Nekfeu; DJ Elite

Audio sample
- "Reuf": file; help

"Reuf" is a song by French hip hop artist Nekfeu featuring English musician Ed Sheeran. The eighth track from Nekfeu's debut studio album Feu, it was produced by Nekfeu himself and DJ Elite.

Although it was not officially released as a single, the song entered the French Singles Chart at number 72 on 20 June 2015, where it peaked. A music video was announced as under development in December 2015, but was cancelled in March 2016 for "technical reasons".

Interviewed on 10 April 2017 on France Inter, Ed Sheeran expressed his pleasure about the collaboration, and said that he "loves Nekfeu, he's a very smart guy. He's so nice too. Although he's a rapper, he doesn't have an arrogant attitude." On 6 June 2020, an audio engineer who worked on Nekfeu's third album, Les étoiles vagabondes, leaked that Nekfeu and Sheeran had collaborated once more on an unreleased version of "Elle pleut".

A new version of the song, produced by Hugz Hefneer, was featured in the French comedy film Five, dropping Sheeran's part in the chorus. This new version came out with a new video made up of excerpts from the film and behind-the-scenes footage.

== Track listing ==
- Digital download
1. "Reuf (featuring Ed Sheeran)" – 5:27

== Charts ==
=== Weekly charts ===
Chart (2015)	Peak position
Belgium (Ultratip Bubbling Under Wallonia)	19
France (SNEP)	72

=== Year-end charts ===
Chart (2015)	Position
France (SNEP)	175
