= Rêve d'avoir des rêves =

Song by Nekfeu

from the album Feu
- Released: 8 June 2015
- Genre: French hip hop; soft rock
- Length: 4:57
- Label: Seine Zoo; Polydor; Universal
- Songwriter(s): Ken Samaras; Clement Loubens
- Producer(s): Nekfeu; DJ Elite

"Rêve d'avoir des rêves" (French for 'Dream of having dreams') is a song by French hip hop artist Nekfeu, produced by himself and DJ Elite. It is the fifth track from his debut studio album Feu.

Although the song was not officially released as a single, the song managed to enter the French Singles Chart at number 111 on 20 June 2015, where it has since peaked.

== Track listing ==
- Digital download
1. "Rêve d'avoir des rêves" – 4:57

== Chart performance ==
| Chart (2015) | Peak position |
|---|---|
| France (SNEP) | 111 |
