= Back to Burgundy =

- Theatrical release poster
- French: Ce qui nous lie
- Directed by: Cédric Klapisch
- Written by: Cédric Klapisch; Santiago Amigorena; Jean-Marc Roulot (collaboration)
- Produced by: Bruno Levy
- Starring: Pio Marmaï; Ana Girardot; François Civil
- Cinematography: Alexis Kavyrchine
- Edited by: Anne-Sophie Bion
- Music by: Loïc Dury; Christophe Minck
- Production companies: Ce Qui Me Meut; France 2 Cinéma
- Distributed by: StudioCanal
- Release date: 14 June 2017
- Running time: 113 minutes
- Country: France
- Language: French
- Budget: $9 million
- Box office: $11.6 million

Back to Burgundy (French: Ce qui nous lie [What binds us]; working title: Le Vin et le vent [The Wine and the wind]) is a 2017 French drama film directed by Cédric Klapisch, starring Pio Marmaï, Ana Girardot and François Civil.

== Plot ==
Three siblings from Burgundy have to find a way to reconnect with one another when their father falls ill. Jean, Juliette and Jérémie were all trained in the art of winegrowing and production by a father made out to be dominant and controlling. Jérémie (who married locally) and Juliette stayed close to the vineyards in adult life, but Jean left, backpacking around the world and working in the wine industry in Chile, where he met his girlfriend Alicia, and finally buying a vineyard with her in Australia. He missed the death of his mother in France, in part because his son was being born on the same day in Australia. He returns to France 10 years after his departure, as his father is ailing (he dies soon after), with mixed feelings. The plot revolves around his coming to terms with the past, his father, and his relationship with Alicia.

The past and present are interconnected in several scenes of childhood and adulthood in and around the vineyards and the family house. Several plot lines intertwine: 1) on the death of their father, the siblings inherit the property jointly, meaning they have to agree on its future, and they owe a large inheritance tax which they cannot afford to pay. Jean initially wants to sell the entire estate so that they can pay the tax and he can clear outstanding debts in Australia. Then Jérémie's unpleasant father in law tries to buy some of the best land. And finally a complex leasing arrangement is reached that satisfies all three siblings. 2) Jean believes his father hated him, but he finds out after his death via an unopened letter that this was not the case. 3) Jean's relationship with Alicia in Australia is fragile. Juliette believes he still loves Alicia despite their decision to separate, and so she phones Alicia. Alicia travels to France with their son late in the movie, and they are reconciled. They decide to live together in Australia. 4) Jérémie is looked down on by his in-laws and lives in one of their cottages with his wife Océane and their son. They eventually move to their own house and refuse offers of jobs and support.

There are sub-plots referring to Juliette's romantic life, the annual cycle of grape and wine production including the crucial date of harvest, and who has the best winegrowing skills (revealed to be Juliette and Jean, not the older generation).

== Cast ==
- Pio Marmaï as Jean
- Ana Girardot as Juliette
- François Civil as Jérémie
- Jean-Marc Roulot as Marcel
- María Valverde as Alicia, Jean's girlfriend
- Yamée Couture as Océane, Jérémie's wife
- Karidja Touré as Lina
- Florence Pernel as Chantal
- Jean-Marie Winling as Anselme
- Éric Caravaca as the father young
- Sarah Grappin as the mother young
- Tewfik Jallab as Marouan
- Cédric Klapisch as a grape picker

== Reception ==
On review aggregator website Rotten Tomatoes, the film holds an approval rating of 70% based on 37 reviews, and an average rating of 6.3/10. The website's critical consensus reads, "Back to Burgundy finds its own subtle terroir in the well-trod ground of family drama—and should prove particularly intoxicating viewing for oenophiles." On Metacritic, the film has a weighted average score of 58 out of 100, based on 13 critics, indicating "mixed or average reviews". Rosi Hanson of Decanter gave the film qualified approval, writing, "I loved this film, but then I love Burgundy. If you do, too, you will forgive the slightly clunky plot and some sentimentality. It's very French in style, and it gets under the skin of Burgundy."
