= On verra (Nekfeu song) =

Single by Nekfeu

from the album Feu
- Released: 1 May 2015
- Recorded: 2015
- Genre: French hip hop; electro hop; pop-rap
- Length: 3:31
- Label: Seine Zoo; Polydor; Universal
- Songwriters: Ken Samaras; Benjamin Seletti
- Producer: BLV

Nekfeu singles chronology
"Égérie" (2015)	"On verra" (2015)	"Nique les clones, Pt. II" (2015)

Audio sample
- "On verra": file; help

Music video
- "On verra" on YouTube

"On verra" (French for 'We'll see') is a song by French hip hop artist Nekfeu and produced by BLV. It was released on May 1, 2015, as the second single from his debut studio album Feu. It entered the French Singles Chart at number 36 on May 9, 2015, and peaked at number 13.

== Music video ==
A music video for the song was released on YouTube on 12 May 2015. It is 3 minutes and 25 seconds long.

Directed by Teva Vasseur, the video shows Nekfeu having fun with friends and rapping to the song in several locations across Paris, including a bridge with love locks, a party and a recording studio. It also features a number of his S-Crew cohorts, as well as French YouTube personality Mister V, and at certain points in the video Nekfeu and his friends are seen sporting merchandise of French football club Paris Saint-Germain.

== Track listing ==
- Digital download
1. "On verra" – 3:31

== Chart performance ==
Chart (2015)	Peak position
Belgium (Ultratop 50 Wallonia)	12
Belgium (Ultratip Bubbling Under Wallonia)	7
France (SNEP)	13

== Certifications ==
Region	Certification	Certified units/sales
France (SNEP)	Diamond	333,333^{‡}
^{‡} Sales+streaming figures based on certification alone.
