= Nekfeu =

French rapper, actor, and producer (born 1990)

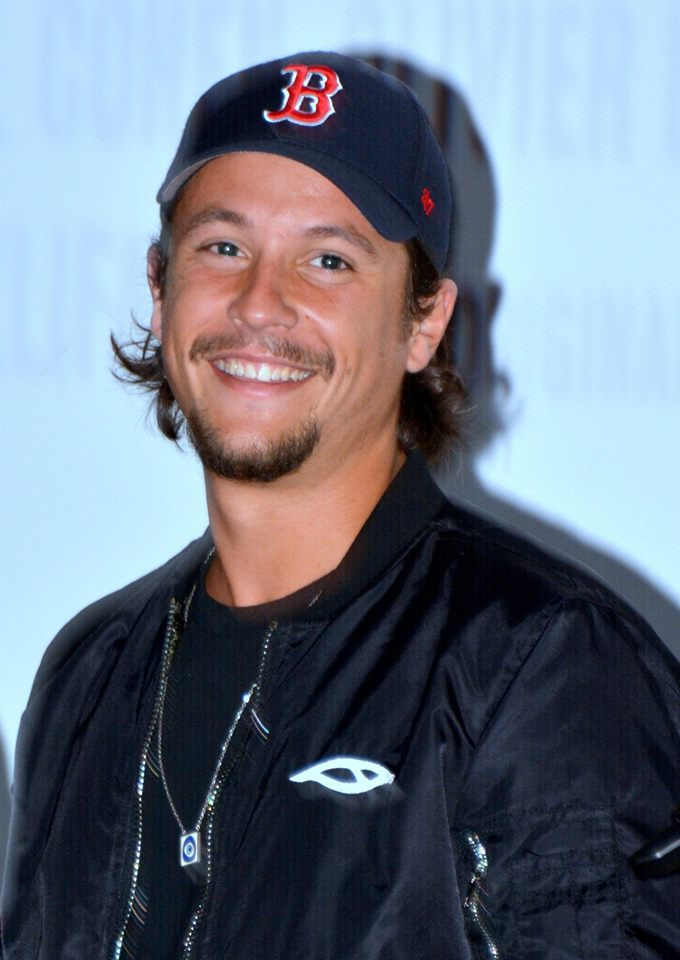
- Nekfeu in 2017

Background information
- Also known as: Nekfeu; Nek le fenek
- Born: Ken Samaras; 3 April 1990 (age 36); La Trinité, France
- Genres: French hip hop
- Occupations: Rapper; record producer; songwriter; actor
- Instrument: Vocals
- Years active: 2001–present
- Labels: Seine Zoo; Universal

Ken Samaras (Greek: Κεν Σαμαράς, Ken Samarás; born 3 April 1990), better known by his stage name Nekfeu (French pronunciation: [nɛk.fø]), is a French rapper, actor and record producer.

He is also a member of the crew L'entourage and the bands $-Crew and 1995. He started his career as a member of $-Crew, with childhood friends Framal, Mekra, 2zer Washington and DJ Elite. He joined 1995 in 2007, participating in open mic duels around Paris.

Released in 2015, his first solo album, Feu, received extensive media coverage; for this, he won best urban music album at the 2016 Victoires de la Musique. His second album, Cyborg, was released in 2016, and his third, Les Étoiles vagabondes, in 2019.

Over the course of his career, he has sold over 2 million albums, and holds two diamond discs and a double diamond disc.

== Early life and career ==
Samaras was born in La Trinité, a commune within the Nice metropolitan area, to a father of Greek descent and a mother of Scottish descent. At the age of 11, he and his family moved to the 15th arrondissement of Paris.

After two extended plays with 1995 (La Source in 2011 and La Suite in 2012), as well as the studio album Paris Sud Minute in 2013, Nekfeu released his debut studio album Feu on 8 June 2015, for which he won Best Urban Music Album at the Victoires de la musique in February 2016, as well as Destins Liés with $-Crew in June 2016. In 2015, he also wrote and performed a song for the French version of the film Creed. In 2016, he released his second album entitled Cyborg.

In 2017, he made his acting debut in the film Tout nous sépare, opposite Catherine Deneuve.

In 2019, he released his third album Les étoiles vagabondes. The album premiered in cinemas, as a movie accompanied the album. The movie premiered two hours before the album was made available on streaming platforms. The album was extremely well received. It included a song featuring Belgian rapper Damso (Tricheur), and many other songs entered the top 20 in the French charts.

== Personal life ==
Nekfeu is a fan of Paris Saint-Germain, based in the city where he grew up, and his hometown club OGC Nice.

== Discography ==
=== Albums, mixtapes and EPs ===
As part of 1995

- 2011: La Source (EP)
- 2012: La Suite (EP)
- 2013: Paris Sud Minute (Album)

With Alpha Wann (member of 1995 & L'Entourage)

- 2011: En Sous-Marin (EP)

As part of $-Crew

- 2010: Même Signature (Mixtape)
- 2012: Métamorphose (Mixtape)
- 2013: Seine Zoo 仙豆 (Album)
- 2016: Destins Liés (Album)
- 2022: SZR2001 (Album)

As part of L'Entourage

- 2014: Jeunes Entrepreneurs (Album)

As part of 5 Majeur

- 2011: 5 Majeur (EP)
- 2013: Variations (Album)

Solo

Year	Album	Peak positions				Units	Certification
Year	Album	FRA	BEL (Fl)	BEL (Wa)	SWI	Units	Certification
2015	Feu: Release date: 8 June 2015; Record label: Seine Zoo / Polydor	3	65	3	5	FRA: 500.000	SNEP: Diamond; BEA: Gold
2016	Cyborg: Release date: 2 December 2016; Record label: Seine Zoo	4	—	3	10	FRA: 500.000	SNEP: Diamond
2019	Les étoiles vagabondes: Release date: 7 June 2019; Record label: Seine Zoo	1	12	1	1	FRA: 1.000.000	SNEP: 2× Diamond
2019	Expansion: Release date: 21 June 2019; Record label: Seine Zoo	1	—	10	—	FRA: 1.000.000	SNEP: 2× Diamond

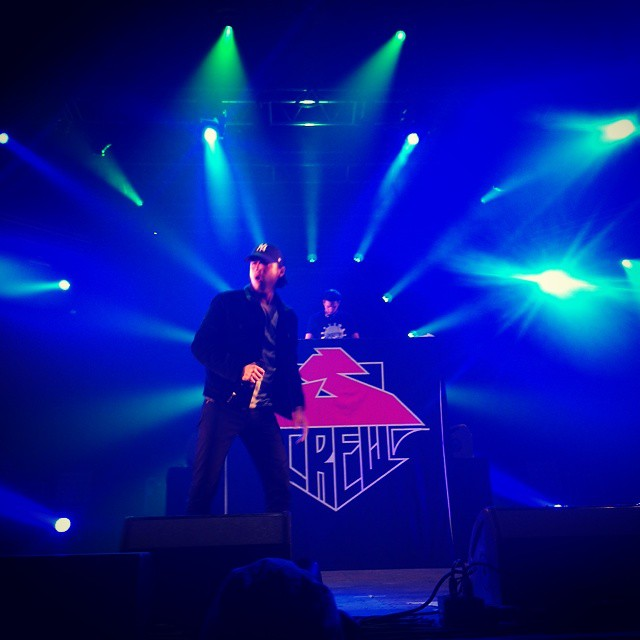
Nekfeu in 2014, performing at a festival in Grenoble

=== Singles ===
Year	Single	Peak positions			Album
Year	Single	FRA	BEL (Wa)	SWI	Album
2014	"Time B.O.M.B."	86	—	—	—
2015	"Égérie"	49	—	—	Feu
2015	"On verra"	14	37	—	Feu
2015	"Nique les clones, Pt. II"	57	—	—	Feu
2015	"Tempête"	21	—	—	Feu
2015	"7:77 AM" (featuring 86 Joon)	26	—	—	Feu (Réédition)
2016	"Jusqu'au bout" ($-Crew)	75	—	—	Destins liés
2019	"Tricheur" (featuring Damso)	1	1	12	Les étoiles vagabondes

=== Featured in ===
Year	Single	Peak positions			Album
Year	Single	FRA	BEL (Wa)	SWI	Album
2014	"Voilà" (Sneazzy featuring Nekfeu)	145	—	—	
2016	"Paris la nuit" (Rim'k featuring Nekfeu)	161	—	—	
2016	"À deux pas " (Alpha Wann featuring Nekfeu)	172	—	—	Alpha Wann album Alph Lauren 2
2016	"Les princes" (MZ featuring Nekfeu)	18	—	—	MZ album La dictature
2017	"Skurt Cobain" (Sneazzy featuring Nekfeu)	165	—	—	
2017	"Tu rêves" (Dean Burbigo featuring Nekfeu)	95	—	—	
2017	"De l'autre côté" (Ninho featuring Nekfeu)	2	—	71	Ninho album Comme prévu
2017	"Zone" (Orelsan featuring Nekfeu with Dizzee Rascal)	12	—	—	Orelsan album La fête est finie
2018	"Juste pour voir" (S.Pri Noir featuring Nekfeu)	70	—	—	Non-album release
2018	"Éternité " (Jazzy Bazz featuring Nekfeu)	46	—	—	Jazzy bazz album Nuit
2018	"Waow" (PLK featuring Nekfeu)	32	—	—	PLK album Polak
2019	"Paire d'As" (Dadju featuring Nekfeu)	10	—	—	Dadju album Poison
2019	"Ce soir" (Doums feat. Nekfeu & Naë)	27	—	—	Non-album release
2020	"Zéro détail" (Sneazzy feat. Nekfeu)	42	—	—	Sneazzy album Nouvo mode
2020	"Étincelles" (Sneazzy feat. Alpha Wann, Nekfeu & S.Pri Noir)	48	—	—	Sneazzy album Nouvo mode
2020	"Turn Up" (Kalash Criminel feat. Nekfeu)	22	—	—	Kalash Criminel album Sélection naturelle
2020	"Moins un" (Dinos feat. Nekfeu)	1	27	49	Dinos album Stamina,
2020	"Ce soir" (Doums feat. Nekfeu & Naë)	27	—	—	Non-album release
2020	"san andreas" (Nekfeu, Lesram)	35	—	—	Alpha Wann album don dada: mixtape, vol 1.
2020	"aaa" (Alpha Wann feat. Nekfeu)	18	—	—	Alpha Wann album don dada: mixtape, vol 1.
2020	"malevil" (Nekfeu)	34	—	—	Alpha Wann album don dada: mixtape, vol 1.
2020	"3095 pt2" (Alpha Wann feat. Nekfeu, 3010)	69	—	—	Alpha Wann album don dada: mixtape, vol 1.
2021	"C'est quoi l'del" (Gims feat. Nekfeu)	—	—	—	Gims album Le Fléau
2021	"Agent orage" (Dean Burbigo feat. Nekfeu)	103	—	—	
2021	"Special" (Laylow feat. Nekfeu & Foushée)	7	45	91	Laylow album L'étrange histoire de Mr. Anderson
2021	"Jeune d'en bas" (Da Uzi feat. Nekfeu)	21	—	—	Da Uzi album Vrai 2 vrai

=== Other charted songs ===
Year	Single	Peak positions			Album
Year	Single	FRA	BEL (Wa)	SWI	Album
2015	"Reuf" (featuring Ed Sheeran)	72	—	—	Feu
2015	"Rêve d'avoir des rêves"	111	—	—	Feu
2015	"Ma dope" (featuring S.Pri Noir)	125	—	—	Feu
2015	"Martin Eden"	129	—	—	Feu
2015	"Mon âme" (featuring Sneazzy)	152	—	—	Feu
2015	"Princesse" (featuring Nemir)	172	—	—	Feu
2015	"Plume"	13	—	—	Feu (Réédition)
2015	"Mal aimé"	51	—	—	Feu (Réédition)
2015	"Question d'honneur" (featuring S-Crew)	78	—	—	Feu (Réédition)
2015	"Deux-trois" (featuring 1995)	56	—	—	Feu (Réédition)
2015	"Pars avec moi" (featuring 1995)	46	—	—	Feu (Réédition)
2015	"Les Bruits de ma Ville" (featuring Phénomène Bizness)	44	—	—	Feu (Réédition)
2015	"La Ballade du Frémont" (featuring Doums)	52	—	—	Feu (Réédition)
2016	"Mauvaise graine"	7	18	72	Cyborg
2016	"Squa"	15	—	67	Cyborg
2016	"Humanoïde"	19	—	69	Cyborg
2016	"Galatée"	21	—	—	Cyborg
2016	"Saturne" (featuring Sneazzy and S.Pri Noir)	25	—	76	Cyborg
2016	"Avant tu riais" (featuring Clara Luciani)	56	—	—	Cyborg
2016	"Réalité augmentée"	67	—	—	Cyborg
2016	"Esquimaux" (featuring Népal)	71	—	—	Cyborg
2016	"Nekketsu" (featuring Crystal Kay)	75	—	—	Cyborg
2016	"Besoin de sens" (featuring Framal and Jazzy Bazz)	106	—	—	Cyborg
2016	"Le regard des gens" (featuring Némir, 2zer, Mekra and Doum's)	113	—	—	Cyborg
2016	"Vinyle" (featuring Alpha Wann)	142	—	—	Cyborg
2016	"O.D" (featuring Murkage Dave)	152	—	—	Cyborg
2016	"Programmé"	197	—	—	Cyborg
2019	"Dans l'univers" (featuring Vanessa Paradis)	2	50	29	Les étoiles vagabondes
2019	"Elle pleut" (featuring Nemir)	3	—	32	Les étoiles vagabondes
2019	"Cheum"	4	—	—	Les étoiles vagabondes
2019	"Les étoiles vagabondes"	5	—	—	Les étoiles vagabondes
2019	"Alunissons"	7	—	—	Les étoiles vagabondes
2019	"Voyage léger"	8	—	—	Les étoiles vagabondes
2019	"Takotsubo"	9	—	—	Les étoiles vagabondes
2019	"Menteur menteur"	11	—	—	Les étoiles vagabondes
2019	"Le bruit qui court"	13	—	—	Les étoiles vagabondes
2019	"Premier pas"	14	—	—	Les étoiles vagabondes
2019	"Ciel noir"	15	—	—	Les étoiles vagabondes
2019	"De mon mieux"	16	—	—	Les étoiles vagabondes
2019	"Compte les hommes" (featuring Alpha Wann)	17	—	—	Les étoiles vagabondes
2019	"Óλά Καλά"	18	—	—	Les étoiles vagabondes
2019	"Koala mouille"	19	—	—	Les étoiles vagabondes
2019	"Pixels" (featuring Crystal Kay)	21	—	—	Les étoiles vagabondes
2019	"1er rôle"	23	—	—	Les étoiles vagabondes
2019	"Ken Kaneki"	18	—	—	Expansion
2019	"Écrire"	21	—	—	Expansion
2019	"Sous les nuages"	23	—	—	Expansion
2019	"CDGLAXJFKHNDATH" (featuring 2Zer and Mekra)	33	—	—	Expansion
2019	"Energie sombre"	38	—	—	Expansion
2019	"Natsukashii"	47	—	—	Expansion
2019	"L'air du temps" (featuring Framal and Doums)	51	—	—	Expansion
2019	"Oui et non"	56	—	—	Expansion
2019	"Rouge à lèvres" (featuring BJ the Chicago Kid)	58	—	—	Expansion
2019	"Chanson d'amour"	59	—	—	Expansion
2019	"De mes cendres"	64	—	—	Expansion
2019	"Jeux vidéo et débats"	66	—	—	Expansion
2019	"Dernier soupir"	74	—	—	Expansion
2019	"Nouvel homme"	76	—	—	Expansion
2019	"Interlude Fifty"	80	—	—	Expansion
2019	"A la base"	83	—	—	Expansion

== Filmography ==
=== Film ===
- 2017 : Tout nous sépare, directed by Thierry Klifa
- 2019 : L'Échappée, directed by Mathias Pardo

=== Television ===
- 2015 : Casting(s) (Television series, one episode : guest appearance as himself)
- 2019 : My Hero Academia (Dubbing the character All for One in the French version)
