= Michaël Raitner =

French singer

Michaël Raitner is a French singer. He is best known for "On doit savoir partir" and "La grange au loup", both 1977.

== Discography ==
- 1975 : "Viens, il va falloir aller plus loin..." / Que s'est-il passé avant nous (under the name Michaël Raytner)
- 1976 : "On doit savoir partir" / C'était la grange aux loups
- 1977 : "Je n'ai plus rien" / On verra
- 1977 : "On se souvient pour oublier" / La nostalgie nous va bien
- 1980 : "Vivre libre sans amour" / Le droit de t'aimer
- 1985 : "Sa voix qui me rappelle" / Quand on dit je t'aime à une fille
- 1986 : "Ultra sensible" / Esclave
- 1996 : "Femmes orientales"
