= Mon âme (Nekfeu song) =

Song by Nekfeu featuring Sneazzy

from the album Feu
- Released: 8 June 2015
- Genre: French hip hop; psychedelic hip hop
- Length: 4:26
- Label: Seine Zoo; Polydor; Universal
- Songwriter(s): Ken Samaras; Ludovic Reclus; Mohamed Amine
- Producer(s): Nekfeu; DJ Elite

Audio sample
- "Mon âme": file; help

"Mon âme" (French for 'My soul') is a song by French hip hop artist Nekfeu featuring his 1995 colleague Sneazzy. It is the second track from Nekfeu's debut studio album Feu and is produced by himself and DJ Elite.

The song entered the French Singles Chart at number 152 on 20 June 2015, where it has since peaked, despite not being officially released as a single.

== Track listing ==
- Digital download
1. "Mon âme (featuring Sneazzy)" – 4:26

== Chart performance ==
Chart (2015)	Peak position
France (SNEP)	152
