= Five (2016 film) =

2016 film by Igor Gotesman

- Theatrical release poster
- Directed by: Igor Gotesman
- Written by: Igor Gotesman
- Produced by: François Kraus, Denis Pineau-Valencienne
- Starring: Pierre Niney; François Civil; Igor Gotesman; Margot Bancilhon; Idrissa Hanrot
- Cinematography: Julien Roux
- Edited by: Stephan Couturier
- Music by: Gush
- Production companies: Les Films du Kiosque; Cinefrance 1888; France 2 Cinéma
- Distributed by: StudioCanal
- Release date: 30 March 2016 (France)
- Running time: 102 minutes
- Country: France
- Language: French
- Budget: $6.6 million
- Box office: $5.5 million

Five is a 2016 French comedy film, written and directed by Igor Gotesman and starring Pierre Niney.

== Plot ==
The film is about a group of five childhood friends who take up the opportunity to live together in an expensive Paris apartment. In order to fund the group's lifestyle, Pierre Niney's character, Samuel, becomes a drug dealer.

== Cast ==
- Pierre Niney as Samuel
- François Civil as Timothée
- Igor Gotesman as Vadim
- Margot Bancilhon as Julia
- Idrissa Hanrot as Nestor
- Pascal Demolon as Barnabé
- Michèle Moretti as Madame Simone
- Bruno Lochet as Gérard
- Lucie Boujenah as Maïa
- Lise Lamétrie as Chantale
- Fanny Ardant as Herself
- Louise Coldefy as Emilie
- Ali Marhyar as Willy

== Reception ==
The Hollywood Reporter compared the film's humour to that of recent American comedies, calling the film "a lively and often rather funny affair, dishing out oodles of sex, drugs and hip-hop, with plenty of below-the-belt humor a l’americaine. Indeed, Five simply wouldn’t exist without The Hangover, Neighbors and Superbad," and adding, "Five never manages to convince in the plot department, though it moves so fast we barely have any time to think about it."

The film has received mixed reviews in the French-language press. L'Obs criticised the film's casting and its crass humour, while Les Inrocks criticised the film for its attitude towards the characters' lifestyle and for its consumerism. Télérama, by contrast, described the film as well written, singling out the performances of Pierre Niney and François Civil for particular praise; L'Express likewise praised these two actors, stating that Civil was the revelation of the film.
