= Ana Girardot =

French actress (born 1988)

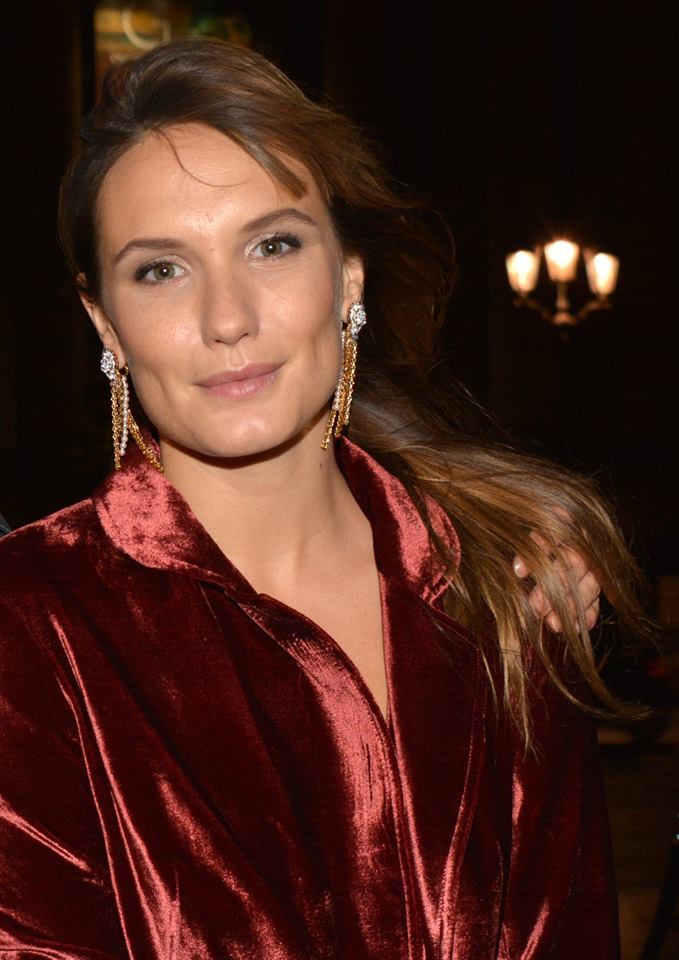
- Girardot at the Dinner of Revelations of César du Cinéma (January 2018)
- Born: Ana Girardot; 1 August 1988 (age 38); Clamart, France
- Occupation: Actress
- Years active: 1992–present
- Children: 2

Ana Girardot (French: [ana ʒiʁaʁdo]; born 1 August 1988) is a French actress. She is known for Escobar: Paradise Lost (2014); her role of Lucy in the television series Les Revenants (The Returned); and Someone, Somewhere (2019).

== Life and career ==
Ana Girardot was born on August 1, 1988, in Paris. Girardot is the daughter of French actor Hippolyte Girardot and actress Isabel Otero, and the granddaughter of painters Antonio Otero and Clotilde Vautier. She chose to become an actress despite her father's disapproval, and later went to New York City for two years to study theater. After performing secondary roles in television and cinema, Girardot scored a leading role in the film Lights Out, which was presented at the 2010 Cannes Film Festival.

== Filmography ==
=== Feature films ===
Year	Title	Role	Notes
1992	Love After Love	Juliette	
2010	Lights Out	Alice Cartier	
2012	My Way	Isabelle Forêt	
2012	Radiostars	Sabrina	
2013	Amitiés sincères	Clémence	
2014	Le Beau Monde	Alice	Nominated—Lumière Award for Best Female Revelation
2014	La Prochaine fois je viserai le cœur	Sophie	Nominated—Lumière Award for Best Female Revelation
2014	Escobar: Paradise Lost	Anne	
2015	A Perfect Man	Alice Fursac	
2015	Foujita	Youki	
2016	Saint-Amour	The twin	
2016	Next Time I’ll Aim for the Heart	Sophie	
2017	Back to Burgundy	Juliette	
2017	Knock	Adèle	
2019	Someone, Somewhere	Mélanie Brunet	
2019	Entangled	Anna	
2020	Final Set	Eve	
2020	Fires in the Dark		
2021	Ogre	Chloé	
2022	House of Lust	Emma	
2024	The Wages of Fear	Clara	
2025	Furcy ? (working title)	Virginie	
2027	Fantômas: The New World	Hélène Gurn	Filming

=== Short films ===
Year	Title	Role
2009	Spiritual America	Tara
2012	216 Mois	Lisa
2012	Les Chancelants	Juliette
2013	Aurore boréale	
2014	Le Refuge	Fontanne
2015	Par consentement mutuel	Astrid's sister
2019	Resonance	Resonance
2021	Dans les parages	Elisa Tannero

=== Television ===
Year	Title	Role	Notes
2010	"Yvette" in Chez Maupassant	Yvette	
2010	Diane, femme flic	Lola	
2012–2015	The Returned	Lucy Clarsen	
2020	La Flamme	Anne	Main cast; 9 episodes
2021	Totems	Anne Mareuil	Main cast; 8 episodes
2024	The Count of Monte Cristo	Mercedes	

=== Music videos ===
- 2010 : It's Working by MGMT

== Theater ==
- 2014 : Romeo and Juliet, Théâtre de la Porte-Saint-Martin
