= Doums =

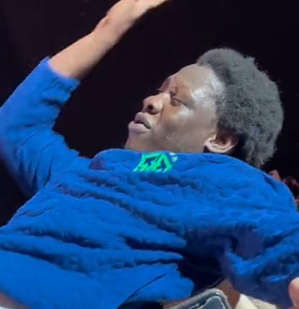
- Doums crowd surfing at the "Zénith de Dijon" in Dijon, France

Background information
- Born: Mamadou Coulibaly; 3 March 1992 (age 34); Bamako, Mali
- Genre: French hip hop
- Occupation: Rapper
- Years active: 2008–present
- Labels: Frémont & Co
- Member of: L'Entourage; 2Fingz(2011-2019)

Mamadou Coulibaly (born 3 March 1992), commonly known by his stage name "Doums", is a French rapper, born in Bamako, Mali. He was part of a duo called "2Fingz" from 2011 with the late rapper Népal, which was active until Népal's death in 2019, and is a member of the collective L'Entourage (lit. 'The entourage').

He is pillar member of the group and is especially close to Nekfeu, who he often appears with. After numerous appearances and a project with L'Entourage, he released three successive EPs: Pilote (2017), Pilote & Co (2019) and Pilot3 (2021).

== Biography ==
Born in Bamako, Mali, Doums grew up in the 9th arrondissement of Paris. In 2008, he co-founded the L'Entourage collective, while he gradually made his mark on the Paris rap scene. With rapper Népal, they formed the duo 2Fingz, and together they released their first homonymous project 2Fingz in 2011, followed by a second,La Folie des Glandeurs (lit. 'Delusions of Grandeur') in 2013.

Jeunes entrepreneurs (lit. 'Young entrepreneurs'), the collective's first project, was released in 2014. The collective toured in support of the album with a concert at the Olympia music hall in Paris on 14 June 2014.

In 2017, after numerous freestyles, live and accompanying appearances on albums including "Feu", "Cyborg" and "Flip", Doums released his debut EP "Pilote" featuring 2zer, Zuukou Mayzie and Alpha Wann.

On 21 September 2018, Alpha Wann's album "Une main lave l'autre (lit. 'One hand washes the other')" (UMLA) was released where Doums appeared on the track "La Lumière dans le noir.(lit. 'Light in the darkness.')"

In June 2019, Doums appeared on the track "L'air du temps(lit. 'The zeitgeist')" with Nekfeu and Framal on the album "Les Étoiles vagabondes(lit. 'Wandering Stars')". He also appears in the film of the same name accompanying the album.

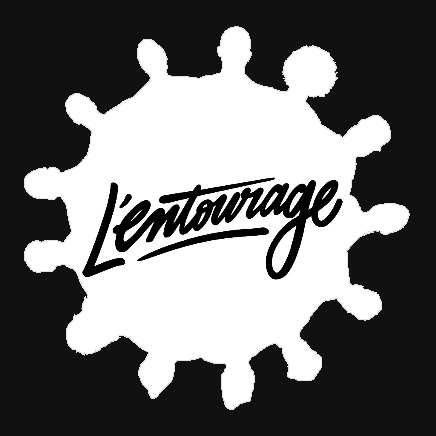
Logo of the L'entourage collective co-founded by Doums

Then on 13 December that year, Doums unveiled an 8-track EP entitled "Pilote & Co". The track "Ce soir (lit. 'Tonight') (feat. Nekfeu)" was accompanied by a video directed by Jules Renault of 360 Creative and produced by Frémont & Co. The clip tells the story of a love affair played out by actors, with Doums and Nekfeu appearing as narrators high above the landscape.

On 24 June 2021, Doums unveiled his third EP, "Pilot3", featuring S.Pri Noir, Blondinet, Framal and Nekfeu.

After releasing his first single, "Movie", at the end of June 2022, followed by a second, "Stars", featuring Laylow, on 26 August 2022, Doums released his first studio album, "Pull à capuche et billets mauves(lit. 'Hoodie and mauve banknotes')". The album featured 16 tracks, including collaborations with rappers PLK, Freeze Corleone, MHD and British rapper Headie One.

== Private life ==
He is Mourtada Alladji Coulibaly's ("Dr. Beriz") younger brother.

He was in a relationship with actress Adèle Exarchopoulos, with whom he has a son. They separated in 2021.

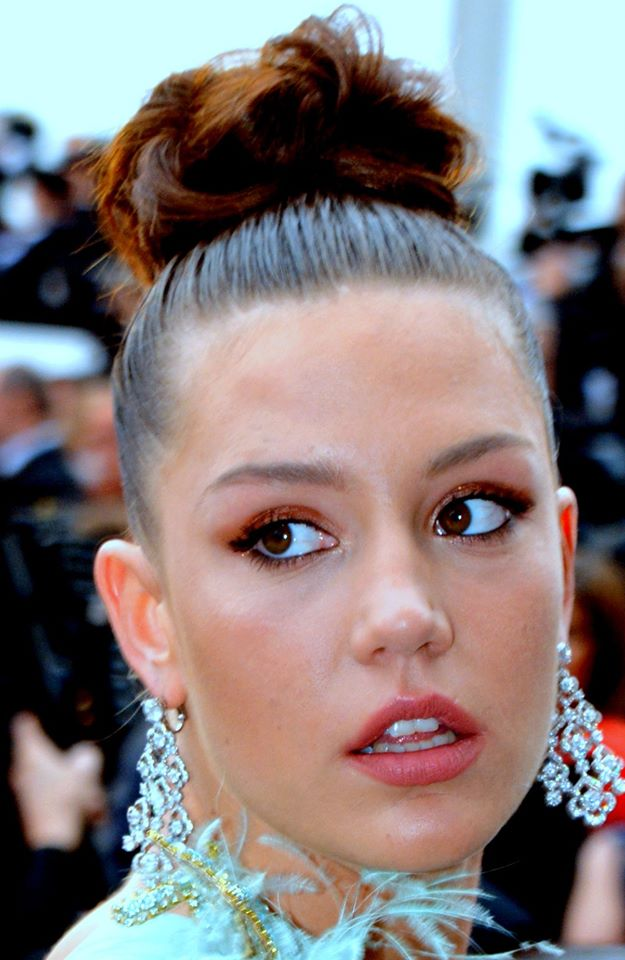
Exarchopoulos at the 2019 Cannes Film Festival

== Discography ==
=== Solo ===
==== Studio albums ====
"Pull à capuche et billets mauves" (2022)

No.	Title	Duration
1	Intro	1:53
2	Movie	3:15
3	90 (feat. Freeze Corleone)	2:54
4	Thalasso (feat.Headie One)	2:30
5	Banlieu	1:57
6	Entre 5 et 7 (Freestyle)	2:23
7	On s'ame (Remix)	3:08
8	Roméo doit mourir	3:37
9	South London (feat. Nekfeu)	3:32
10	Mondéo(feat. PLK)	2:58
11	Usher (Slkrack feat. Chizii)	3:09
12	Stars (feat. Laylow)	3:09
13	Fresh	3:19
14	Électron Libre (feat. 2zer, Deen Burbigo, Eff Gee, Jazzy Bazz)	3:59
15	Un deux marqué le pas (feat. MHD)	2:17
16	Roller Champagne	3:18

==== EP’s ====
"Pilote" (2017)

No.	Title	Duration
1	Intro	3:00
2	Q.D.C.	3:50
3	Zénith	3:41
4	Chronos	3:43
5	Dans le sang	2:53
6	Oulala (feat. 2zer)	3:18
7	Pharaons noirs (feat. Zuukou Mayzie 667)	3:39
8	Juenes retraités (feat. Alpha Wann)	4:44

"Piolte & Co" (2019)

No.	Title	Duration
1	Millions	3:13
2	Noor (feat. 2zer)	2:28
3	S'il suffisait	2:58
4	Besoin de personne (feat. Abou Tall)	3:24
5	Ok (feat. Gros Mo)	3:16
6	Onda (feat. S.Pri Noir)	4:01
7	Ce soir (feat. Naë,Nekfeu)	2:47
8	Le Fer (feat.Népal)	1:41

"Pilot3" (2021)

No.	Title	Duration
1	En effet	3:26
2	Capital (feat. Blondinet, S.Pri Noir)	3:27
3	Si tu pars (feat. Framal)	3:32
4	Don Quichotte	2:48
5	On y est (feat. Nekfeu)	2:57

=== Group ===
==== EP ====
- 2011: "2Fingz" (with 2Fingz)

==== Mixtape ====
- 2013: "La Folie des Glandeurs" (with 2Fingz)

==== Studio albums ====
- 2014: "Jeunes entrepreneurs" (with L'Entourage)

=== Appearances ===
- 2011: Guizmo - Solitaire (feat. Eff Gee, Jazzy Bazz et Doums) (On the album "Normal")
- 2012: $-Crew - Métamorphose feat. Doums, Sango (On the mixtape "Métamorphose")
- 2012: $-Crew - Au coin de ma rue (feat. Doums)(On the mixtape "Métamorphose")
- 2012: $-Crew - J’ai le seum (feat. Doums) (On the mixtape "Métamorphose")
- 2012: Eff Gee - Bouteille de Hennessy feat. Doums, Jazzy Bazz (On the album "Keskon Eff?")
- 2013: Walter et Lomepal - 7 jours (feat. Fixpen Sill, Nino Ice, Hugo Délire, Doums)
- 2013: Caballero - Médaille d’or (feat. Lomepal, Doums) (On the mixtape "Laisse Nous Faire Vol.1")
- 2013: $-Crew - Personne feat. Doums (On the album "Seine Zoo")
- 2013: $-Crew - Barman feat. Doums (On the album "Seine Zoo")
- 2014: Lomepal - Enter The Void feat. Doums (On the EP "Seigneur")
- 2015: Nekfeu - Jeux d’ombres feat. Doums, Amber-Simone (On the album "Feu")
- 2015: Nekfeu - La ballade du Frémont feat. Doums (On the reissue of the album "Feu")
- 2016: $-Crew - L’art et la manière feat. Doums (On the album Destin Liés)
- 2016: Népal - Suga suga feat. Doums (On the mixtape "444 Nuits")
- 2016: Nekfeu - Le regard des gens feat. Doums, Mekra, 2zer, Nemir (On the album "Cyborg")
- 2017: Lomepal - Lucy (feat. 2Fingz (Népal and Doums)) (On the album "Flip")
- 2017: Népal - Deadpornstars feat. Doums (On the mixtape "445e Nuit")
- 2017: Doums - Règlement Freestyle #5
- 2017: Sneazzy - Parle pas trop feat. Alpha Wann, Caballero, Doums (On the EP "Dieu bénisse Supersound Vol. 3")
- 2018: Alpha Wann - Kim K feat. Doums (On the EP "Alph Lauren 3")
- 2018: Alpha Wann - La lumière dans noir feat. Doums (On the album "Une main lave l'autre")
- 2019: DJ Elite - Notting Hill feat. Doums (Sur l’album Blackbird)
- 2019: Waxx - Reason (feat. Doums) ("On the album Fantôme")
- 2019: Nekfeu - L’air du temps feat. Doums, Framal (On the album "Les étoiles vagabondes")
- 2020: Népal - Millionaire feat. Doums (On the album "Adios Bahamas")
- 2020: Zuukou Mayzie 667 - Youssouf et Mamadou (feat. Doums) (On the album "Primera Temporada")
- 2021: Slkrack - Location feat. Doums, Georgio (On the EP "SL500")
- 2021: Hache-P - Livraison feat. Doums, Eff Gee (On the mixtape "Le Big")
- 2021: Georgio - Unique feat. Doums (On the album "Ciel Enflammé - Sacré")
- 2022: $-Crew - Mauvais dans le fond feat. PLK, Doums (On the album "SZR 2001")
- 2022: Nekfeu, Eff Gee, Doums - Quotidien (On the "Saboteur Mixtape, Vol. 1")
