= Vladimir Cauchemar =

French DJ and record producer (born 1978)

- Vladimir Cauchemar at Beauregard Festival 2026

Background information
- Born: Guillaume Brière; 17 December 1978 (age 47); Reims, France
- Genres: Trap; hip-hop; french house
- Years active: 2001–present
- Labels: Lokomotiv Sound (Virgin Records); Ed Banger
- Website: vladimircauchemar.store

Vladimir Cauchemar (born Guillaume Brière; 17 December 1978) is a French DJ, composer, and record producer. A member of the bands The Film and The Shoes, he debuted as a solo artist with his single "Aulos", released by Ed Banger Records, a label founded and run by Busy P. He performs gigs publicly wearing a skull mask.

== Biography ==
Formerly signed to Ed Banger Records, Vladimir Cauchemar produces music under his label, Lokomotiv Sound, licensed by Virgin Music France. Ed Banger Records describes him as "a musician who lost a contest to the god Apollo and is seeking revenge 2,500 years later."

In 2017, he produced several tracks on Lomepal's second album Jeannine. That same year, he released his first solo single, "Aulos", which was a hit. In 2018, he released a new version of the song, titled "Aulos Reloaded", featuring American rapper 6ix9ine. In 2019, he produced several tracks on Roméo Elvis' debut album Chocolat. That same year, he released two songs, "(G)rave" and "Shining", the latter being a collaboration with musical artist Lazy Flow. "Shining" became popular thanks to an advertising campaign on Instagram.

For Halloween of that year, he released "La Famille Adam" featuring Belgian rappers Caballero and JeanJass. In 2021, he released "Élévation", a collaboration with French rapper Vald.

== Discography ==
=== EPs ===
- Brrr (2021)

=== Singles ===
==== Certified singles ====
Title	Year	Peak chart positions	Certifications	Album
Title	Year	FRA	Certifications	Album
Aulos	2017	141	SNEP: Gold	Non-album single
Elévation (featuring Vald)	2019	64	SNEP: Gold	Brrr

==== Non-certified singles ====
- 2018: "Aulos Reloaded" (featuring 6ix9ine)
- 2019: "(G)rave"
- 2019: "Shining" (with Lazy Flow featuring Owen River)
- 2019: "La Famille Adam" (featuring Caballero and JeanJass)
- 2020: "Elévation (Basstrick Remix)" (featuring Vald and Basstrick)
- 2020: "Born Winner" (featuring JP the Wavy)
- 2020: "Regarde" (featuring Hiyadam)
- 2020: "Dancer" (featuring Alyona Alyona)
- 2021: "Les professeurs" (featuring Seth Gueko and Freeze Corleone)
- 2021: "Brrr" (with ASDEK featuring Laylow and Rim'K)
- 2021: "Blizzard" (featuring Benjamin Epps)
- 2022: "Baby Flute"
- 2022: "Anthropology"
- 2023: "Snow is Falling" (featuring Clare Maguire)
- 2023: "GOD" (with Shlømo featuring Lex)
- 2023: "Extendo" (with SCH and Unknown T)
- 2023: "Anthropology 2, the final"
- 2024: "Zoo (Rave Edit)" (with Kaaris and Airod)
- 2024: "Hunter" (with Ganja White Night and Todiefor)

=== Collaborations ===
- 2019: "Impec" (Lorenzo feat. Vladimir Cauchemar & Tommy Cash) (from the album Sex in the City)
- 2019: "La chanson de Delphine" (The Song of Delphine) (Clara Luciani feat. Vladimir Cauchemar) (from the album Sainte-Victoire (Super Edition))
- 2019: "Je mets le way"(Jul feat. Vladimir Cauchemar) (from the album C’est pas des LOL)
- 2020: "Ta vie" (Michel feat. Vladimir Cauchemar) (from the mixtape Le vrai Michel 2)
- 2020: "Dracula" (Lacrim feat. Sfera Ebbasta & Vladimir Cauchemar) (from the mixtape R.I.P.R.O Volume IV)
- 2022: "RIP" (Apashe X Vladimir Cauchemar) (Single)
- 2022: "L'hymne du pogo" (The Pogo Anthem) (Soso Maness feat. Vladimir Cauchemar) (Single)
- 2023: "Water" (Asdek feat. Vladimir Cauchemar) (Single)

=== Remixes ===
- 2018: The Magician - "Las Vegas" (Vladimir Cauchemar Remix)
- 2018: Orelsan vs. Cardi B - "Basik Yellow" (Vladimir Cauchemar Remix)
- 2018: Andy C - "Valley of the Shadows" (Vladimir Cauchemar Edit)
- 2018: Kanye West and Lil Pump - "I Love It" (Vladimir Cauchemar Remix)
- 2018: Mura Musa and Octavian - "Move Me" (Vladimir Cauchemar Edit)
- 2019: Lil Pump and Lil Wayne - "Be Like Me" (Vladimir Cauchemar Remix)
- 2022: Kungs - "Clap Your Hands" (Vladimir Cauchemar Remix)
- 2022: Tony Romera ft. Max Wassen - “Party On My Own” (Vladimir Cauchemar Remix)
- 2023: Jengi - "Bel Mercy" (Vladimir Cauchemar Remix)
- 2023: Klaus Nomi - "The Cold Song" (Vladimir Cauchemar Remix)

=== Production credits ===
- 2017: Lomepal - "70" (from the album Flip)
- 2017: Orelsan - "Paradis" and "Quand est-ce que ça s'arrête ?" (from the album La fête est finie)
- 2018: Georgio - "Ca bouge pas" and "Haute couture" (from the album XX5)
- 2018: Lomepal - "Plus de larmes", "1000°C" feat. Roméo Elvis and "Trop beau" (from the album Jeannine)
- 2019: Roméo Elvis - "Cœur des hommes", "La Belgique Afrique", "Malade", "Soleil", "T'es bonne", "Perdu" feat. Damon Albarn, and "Parano" feat. -M- (from the album Chocolat)
- 2019: Lomepal - "Yusuf" (from the reissue of the album Jeannine, Amina)
- 2020: Gambi - "Macintosh" (from the album La vie est belle)
- 2020: Roshi - "Champions" (from the album Attaque II)
- 2021: Eddy de Pretto - "Val de Larmes" (from the album [À tous les bâtards)
- 2022: Chilla - "Cauchemars" (from the album Ego)
- 2022: Lorenzo feat Jean Dujardin - "Le Daron" (from the album Légende Vivante)
