= Georgio (rapper) =

French rapper and singer

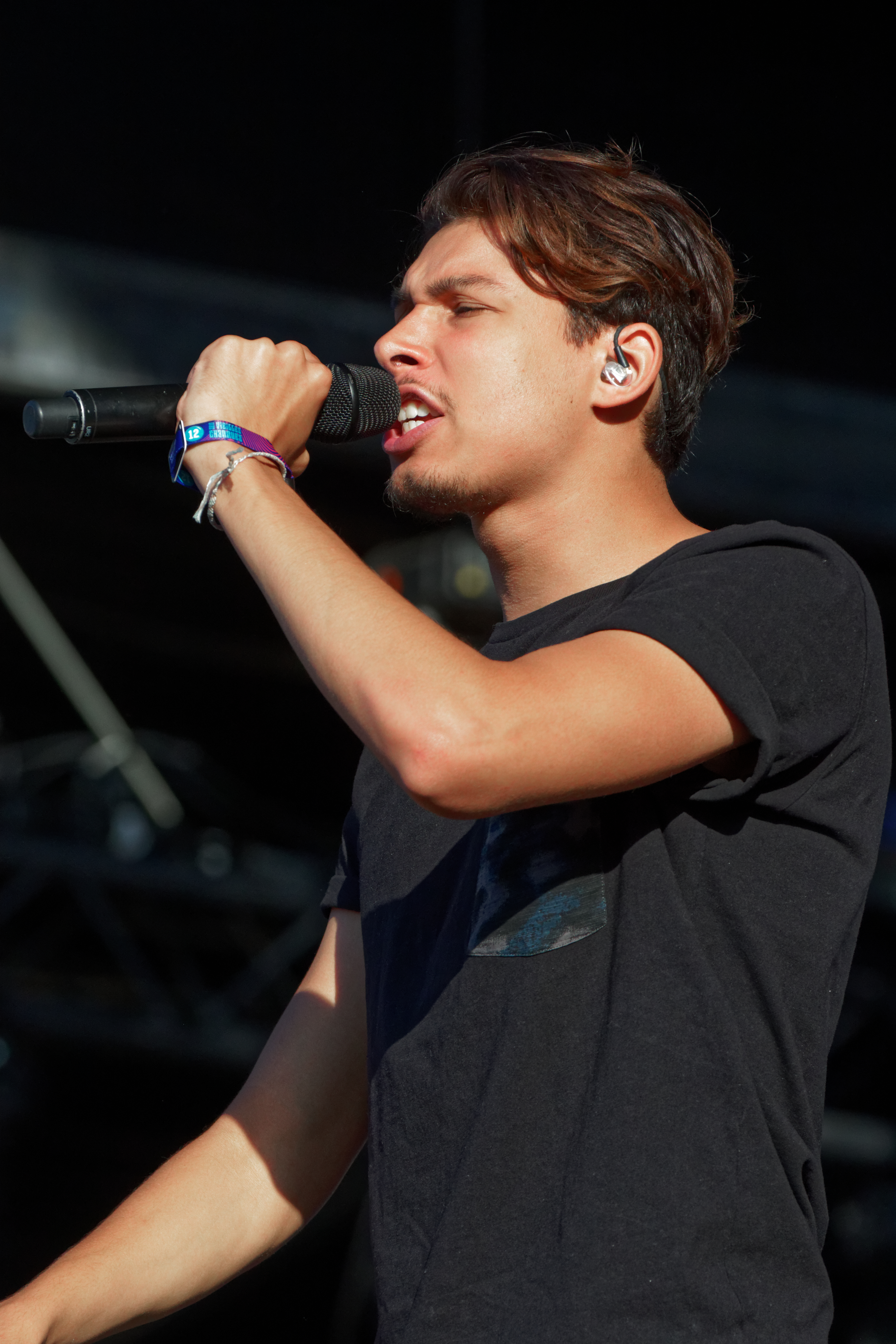
- Georgio performing at the Vieilles Charrues in 2017

Background information
- Born: Georges Édouard Nicolo; 21 January 1993 (age 33)
- Origin: Lilas, Seine-Saint-Denis, France
- Genres: French rap
- Years active: 2007-present

Georges Édouard Nicolo better known by the stage name Georgio (born in Lilas, Seine-Saint-Denis, France on 21 January 1993) is a French rapper and singer of Guadeloupean descent and originating from 18e arrondissement of Paris. He has released four studio albums, Bleu noir (2015), Héra (2016), XX5 (2018) and Sacré (2021) and most recently Années Sauvages (2022). He also released 5 EPs and a number of singles.

== Beginnings ==
Of Guadeloupean descent, Georgio came from a broken home with divorced parents. He has a brother, Anatole, who is passionate about football. In his middle school years, he lived in Angers, before moving to the 18e arrondissement. He developed an interest in music and basketball from a very young age. Georgio left school early for a street life which made him have a number of run-ins with the law and concentrating on his rap, his passion, working small jobs to make some living. By 14, he was writing his first rap pieces. Having many rapper friends, he started with the group 93 millimètres. At 16 he lived for a while with his grandmother in La Celle Saint Cloud in the commune of Yvelines. In a difficult period, he discovered love of reading and music was a common trait with his grandmother and that inspired the song "La Celle Saint Cloud" in his album Bleu Noir.

== Career ==
His first project was a net tape Une Nuit Blanche, des Idées Noires which was a collection of various pieces from 2009 à 2011. His first real project was in 2012 titled Mon Prisme available for free download with 11 songs including two instrumental pieces and a remix. Invitees included 2zer Washington of S-Crew and L'Entourage, also Acide Verbal and Jane. His first EP Soleil d'Hiver was released on 6 May 2013. that included 9 songs produced by the beatmaker Hologram Lo' from 1995. Collaborations included Vald, Lomepal, Alpha Wann, Koma and C-Sen. He followed that up with a freely available mixtape Nouveau Souffle On 19 May 2014, he released the EP À l'Abri, with 8 titles and a bonus title.

A break came with being in the rap collective 75ème Session with names like rappers Népal, Sanka, Sheldon, Limsa, Sopico, Hash24, in addition to graphic artists video makers and benefitted from recording possibilities in a recording studio. In October 2014, he said he was parting way with 75ème Session. He continued working with his childhood friend Sanka/ He also collaborated with beatmakers Diabi and A Little Rooster.

In his lyrics and in interviews, Georgio said he was inspired by his family, friends and surroundings and areas around Métro Marx Dormoy in the 18th arrondissement. In his debut album Bleu Noir, he talked about his suffering from depression. later he was effected by his first love Salomé, a recurring theme in his songs, and later in his second album titled Héra, an ode for love and referring to the goddess of marriage. Georgio was also very much into reading sharing literary passages with friends and through social media including references in his song lyrics, also citing his preferred poet Robert Desnos, in his concert of rap and literature titled Proses during the 19ème Printemps des Poètes, also citing Céline, Vladimir Maïakovski, Henri Michaux, Marc Aurèle, Romain Gary. In a cultural event organized by the radio station France Culture, Georgio used a text by Frida Kahlo, in a music version.

== Discography ==
=== Albums ===
Year	Album	Peak positions			Certification
Year	Album	FR	BEL (Wa)	SWI	Certification
2015	Bleu noir	13	32	—	
2016	Héra	15	36	53	
2018	XX5	26	52	91	
2021	Sacré	3	42	23	
2023	Années sauvages	2	11	57	
2025	Gloria	—	57	63	

=== EPs ===
Year	Title	Peak positions	Certification
Year	Title	FR	Certification
2011	Une nuit blanche, des idées noires	—	
2012	Mon prisme	—	
2013	Soleil d'hiver (joint album with Hologram Lo')	—	
2014	Nouveau souffle	—	
2014	À l'abri	49	

=== Singles ===
Year	Title	Peak positions	Album
Year	Title	FR	Album
2014	"À l'abri"	155	À l'abri
2014	"Le poing levé, les yeux bandés"	199	
2016	"Héra"	181	Héra
2016	"La terre, je la dévore"	182	Héra
2018	"Mirroir"	153	XX5
2021	"Full Moon" (feat. S.Pri Noir)	63	Sacre

=== Featured in ===
Year	Title	Peak positions	Album
Year	Title	FR	Album
2014	"VOYOU" (Fauve feat. Georgio)	138	Vieux frères – Partie 1

=== Appearances and collaborations ===
- 2011: "Elyxir" - Vald feat. Georgio
- 2012: "La Ive" - Vald feat. Georgio
- 2012: "Épices Loufoques" - Vald feat. Georgio
- 2012: "Good Time" - Mothas la Mascarade feat. Tonio Mc, Lomepal & Georgio
- 2012: "Freestyle Séquestration" - Vald feat. Georgio
- 2012: "Anonymous" - 2 zer Washington feat. Georgio
- 2013: "1er Round" - Limsa feat. Georgio & Salim
- 2013: "Trop d'Amérique" - Sanka feat. Georgio
- 2014: "Missak" - Demi Portion, Lucio Bukowski, Liqid, Ethor Skull, Nekfeu, Dico, Doc Brown, Georgio & Vald
- 2014: "On oublie pas" - Aladin 135 feat. Georgio
- 2014: "Voyous" - Fauve feat. Georgio
- 2014: "Freestyle Daymolition" - Vald feat. Georgio
- 2020: "Besoin de personne" - Tsew The Kid feat. Georgio
- 2020: "Pas comme nous" - Matou feat. Jok'Air & Georgio
