= Hiro (singer) =

French singer

- Also known as: Hiro Le Coq; Mr Propre; Hiro le jeune premier
- Born: Dimitri Nganda; 14 July 1991 (age 34); Melun in Seine-et-Marne, France
- Genres: Contemporary R&B, rap, hip-hop
- Occupations: Singer; Composer
- Instrument: Vocals
- Years active: 2007–present
- Labels: Bomayé Musik; Mukongo Business (2013–2018); Millésime Musik; Urban Pias (Since 2018)

Dimitri Nganda (born 14 July 1991), known professionally as Hiro (aka Hiro Le Coq, Mr Propre), is a French singer and composer from Melun.

== Biography ==
=== Early life ===
Dimitri Nganda was born in Melun, France on 14 July 1991. He is of Congolese descent. Hiro's parents encouraged him to pursue music during his childhood. He began writing lyrics and singing during his teens with a passion for rap and singing. Major inspirations are Papa Wemba and Koffi Olomide.

In 2007, he founded the music group Bana C4 with friends. They became popular in the local scene and released their first single ‘Charabia’ in 2011.

== Career ==
Nicknamed phénomène africain (African phenomenon), he released his first hit single, which was then certified Gold Single. Then he collaborated with artists such as Youssoupha, Keblack, Sidiki Diabaté, Koffi Olomidé and Naza. He released his very first album, then sang Johnny Hallyday. Finally at the beginning of 2018, he decided to leave Bomayé. He found his own label “Millésime Musik”.

=== De la haine à l'amour (2016–2018) ===
On 18 May 2016, Hiro released the first single Aveuglé without making an announcement for the album. On April 28, 2017, Hiro released the second single Touché coulé with Youssoupha and announced the release of his first studio album De la haine à l'amour, without giving a date. On 23 August 2017, he released Molo (a non-album track), and announced the album date for 23 October 2017, except that he postponed the album's release to December 1, 2017. On 3 November 2017, he released Désolé with Sidiki Diabaté, this clip was released the same day that De la haine à l'amour could be pre-ordered8. On 30 October 2017, he released a freestyle En attendant #DelahainealAmour. He then released Tourné le dos with KeBlack on 24 November 2017.

After his first album was released in 2018, Hiro announced his first concert in Abidjan, a city in Ivory Coast.

=== Erratum (2019–2020) ===
On June 28, 2019, he released his second studio album Erratum: a 19-track project and collaborated with Bolémvn, Daphne, Kalash Criminel, Naza, Ninho, Singuila, Still Fresh and Toofan. In June 2020, he reissued his album which added 8 tracks and collaborated with Davido and Gabriel Do Borel.

== Discography ==
=== Studio albums ===
- 2017: De la haine à l'Amour (Bomayé Musik, Mukongo Business)
- 2019: Erratum (Millésime Musik, Urban Pias)
- 2020: Erratum (Deluxe Edition) (Millésime Musik, Urban Pias)
- 2021: Afro Romance (Millésime Musik, Urban Pias)

=== Mixtape / Collaborative albums ===
- 2011: Therapy, vol. 1
- 2013: Jeunes premiers
- 2013: Therapy, vol. 2 (En attendant "Arrêt de jeu")
- 2014: Arrêt de jeu
- 2015: Pona yo

=== Singles ===
- 2016: Laissez-les (feat. Naza)
- 2016: Aveuglé
- 2016: Ton pied, mon pied (feat. Chidinma)
- 2016: Passement de jambes (feat. DJ Louda)
- 2016: Monica
- 2016: Mayday
- 2017: Aveuglé (Mowlo Remix) (feat. Youssoupha)
- 2017: Touché coulé (feat. Youssoupha)
- 2017: Billet (feat. S.Pri Noir)
- 2017: Molo
- 2017: Désolé (feat. Sidiki Diabaté)
- 2017: Tourné le dos (feat. KeBlack)
- 2018: Tuer
- 2018: Comme personne
- 2018: Tu es à moi
- 2019: Doucement
- 2019: A découvert (feat. Ninho)
- 2021: Quatre secondes (feat. Koba LaD)
- 2021: Anéanti

== Personal life ==
He is an activist for children's education and to reduce poverty in Africa.
