= Népal (rapper) =

French rapper (1990–2019)

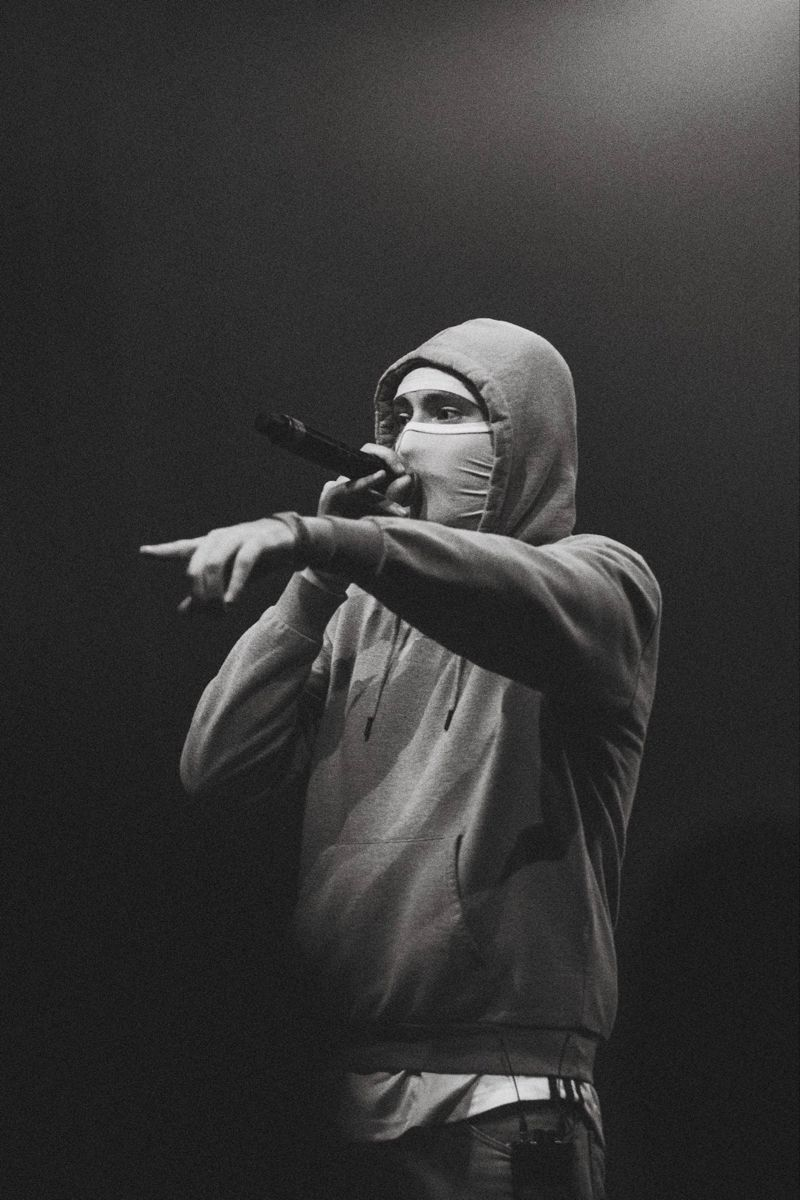
- Népal in concert on April 7, 2019.

Background information
- Also known as: KLM, Grandmaster Splinter
- Born: Clément Enzo Florian di Fiore; 12 October 1990; Paris, France
- Origin: 14th arrondissement of Paris
- Died: 9 November 2019 (aged 29) Clichy-la-Garenne, Île-de-France, France
- Genres: French hip hop
- Occupations: Record producer; rapper; graphic designer; videographer
- Years active: 2010-2019
- Labels: 75e Session, Triple 4 Gear

2FingZ
- Origin: Paris, France
- Genres: French rap
- Years active: 2011-2018
- Past members: Doums; Népal

Clément Enzo Florian di Fiore (French pronunciation: [klemɑ̃ ɛnzo flɔʁjɑ̃ di fjɔʁe]; 12 October 1990 – 9 November 2019), better known by his stage name Népal (pronounced [nepal]), was a French record producer and rapper. He was also known as KLM and GrandMaster Splinter. A co-founding member of the collective 75e Session, he produced their EP 16par16 in 2014. He also formed with Doums the duo 2Fingz. He was also close to the collective L'Entourage, to the band 1995 and the project Les Gars Laxistes. Népal attached great importance to remain anonymous, covering his face with a hood, a mask, or even with makeup.

Népal died on 9 November 2019. He was 29. The announcement came after 11 days on social networks on 20 November 2019 including the posthumous release of his album Adios Bahamas that he had just completed recording.

Posthumously, on 5 September 2020, the video "Sundance' was released, featuring rapper Nekfeu portraying a version of himself that would have missed out on success, directed by Syrine Boulanouar and produced by 75e Session, based on an idea expressed by Népal just prior to his demise.

== Discography ==
=== Solo albums ===
(as Népal)

Title	Year	Peak positions		
Title	Year	FRA	BEL (Wa)	SWI
2016 - 2018	2018	70	52	–
Adios Bahamas	2020	8	5	18

=== 2FingZ albums ===
(duo with Doum's)

- 2011: 2FingZ
- 2013: La folie des glandeurs grande dique

=== EPs and Remixes ===
as Grandmaster Splinter

- 2012: Medley Vol. 1
- 2012: Medley Vol. 2
- 2013: Medley Vol. 3

as Népal

- 2014: 16par16
- 2014: 16par16 Remix
- 2016: 444 Nuits
- 2016: 445e Nuit
- 2018: KKSHISENSE8 (2018)

as KLM

- 2015: Enter The Dojo Vol. 1 (produced for 75e Session)
- 2017: Slow Mix 06/08/17 (remixes for 75e Session)
- 2018: Slow Mix 07/02/18 (remixes for 75e Session)

=== Singles featured in ===
Title	Year	Peak positions	Album
Title	Year	FRA	Album
"Esquimaux" (Nekfeu feat. Népal)	2016	72	Nekfeu album Cyborg

=== Other charting songs ===
Title	Year	Peak positions		Album
Title	Year	FRA	BEL (Wa)	Album
"Rien d'spécial"	2019	136	Tip*	
"En face" (feat. Nekfeu)	2020	56	–	Adios Bahamas
"Sundance"	2020	74	Tip*	Adios Bahamas
"Trajectoire"	2020	81	–	Adios Bahamas
"Daruma"	2020	130	Tip*	Adios Bahamas
"Vibe" (feat. Sheldon)	2020	165	–	Adios Bahamas
"Lemonade"	2020	167	–	Adios Bahamas
"Là-bas"	2020	172	–	Adios Bahamas
"Ennemis, Pt. 2" (feat. Di-Meh)	2020	175	–	Adios Bahamas
"Millionaire" (feat. Doums)	2020	188	–	Adios Bahamas

*Did not appear in the official Belgian Ultratop 50 charts, but rather in the bubbling under Tipparade charts.

Others

- "James Worthy"
- "Fugu"
- "66 Mesures"
- "Abra"

Posthumously

(all in 2020)

- "Dans le fond"
- "Cheddar"
- "Coach K
- "Même vie"
- "Benji"

=== Collaborations ===
- 2010: Hippocampe Fou feat. Népal (KLM) - "Clash"
- 2011: John Doe ∅ 1 (Freestyle Anonyme)
- 2012: Reeko feat. Nekfeu, Alpha Wann, KLM - "Coup de crayon"
- 2013: Sanka feat. Népal - "Un monde imaginaire" on EP Nomade Shaolin
- 2014: 75e Session feat. 13 Sarkastick, Panama Bende - "La Diff" on EP Paris - Genève
- 2014: Di-Meh feat. Népal, Limsa - "Le taff est fait" on EP Reste calme
- 2014: Grünt #18 feat. 75e Session
- 2014: Di-Meh feat. Népal - "Paris-Genève 2" on EP Dimeh Hendrix
- 2014: Sheldon feat. Népal, Walter - "Le Grand Bond en avant"
- 2015: Di-Meh feat. Nepal - "Fu Gee La" on EP Entre le rap et la vraie vie
- 2015: Fonky Drü feat. 75e Session - "Azur" on EP Delta 64236
- 2015: FA2L feat. Népal, Losti - "Petit frère" on EP Fameux
- 2015: FA2L feat. Népal - "La Cigarette" on EP Fameux
- 2016: Nekfeu feat. Népal - "Esquimaux" on the album Cyborg
- 2016: Népal & Diabi - "Benjamin Franklin" on EP The Lost Draft
- 2016: Les Chics Types feat. Népal - "Cafard Boulevard" on EP Tout Baigne
- 2017: Lomepal feat. 2Fingz - "Lucy" on album Flip
- 2017: Di-Meh feat. Népal - "Ennemis" on EP Focus
- 2017: L'affreux Jojo feat. Népal - "A l'aise" on EP Portraits gachés
- 2018: Sopico feat. Népal - "Domo" on album YË
- 2018: Grünt Hors-Série feat. Doums, Nekfeu, Alpha Wann, 2zer, Framal, Mekra
- 2018: Bohemian Club feat. Népal - "Toxic" on EP Substance M
- 2018: Troisième Freestyle de la série "Règlement Space" de la chaine du Règlement
- 2019: M le Maudit feat. Népal - "ÉVEIL" on EP I HATE LOVE
- 2019: WondaGurl feat. Népal - "City Lights, Pt.2" on EP Toronto - Paris
- 2019: Fixpen Sill feat. Népal - "Touareg" on album FLAG
- 2019: Doum's feat. Népal - "Le fer" on album Pilote & Co
