= Cyborg (Nekfeu album) =

Studio album by Nekfeu
- Released: 2 December 2016
- Genre: French hip hop
- Length: 60:30
- Language: French
- Label: Seine Zoo; Polydor
- Producer: Diabi; En'Zoo; Hologram Lo'; Hugz Hefner; KLM; Loubensky; Nepal; VM the Don

Nekfeu chronology
Destins liés (2016)	Cyborg (2016)	Les étoiles vagabondes (2019)

Cyborg is the second studio album by French hip-hop artist Nekfeu. Released on 2 December 2016 by Seine Zoo, the album peaked at number 4 on the French Albums Chart.

Cyborg was released without any prior promotion or singles, with Les Inrocks branding it a "surprise album". On its first day of release on Spotify, the album broke the French record for most album streams within 24 hours; within its first two weeks of release (on all platforms), the album was certified platinum in France with over 100,000 sales.

== Background ==
"Squa"
After the album's announcement at the AccorHotels Arena in Bercy, Nekfeu performed "Squa", the third song from the album, live in concert.

After releasing his debut studio album Feu in June 2015, Nekfeu embarked on the Feu Tour towards the end of the year to further promote his album. In June 2016, one of his groups, S-Crew, released a studio album entitled Destins liés.

On 1 December 2016, during the final concert of the Feu Tour at the AccorHotels Arena in Bercy, Nekfeu announced the release of Cyborg as a "surprise album", having had no promotion or singles released prior to release.

== Reception ==
=== Critical reception ===
Cyborg was received with widespread acclaim from music critics. Music Feelings called the album "quite genuine," adding that it is "tied together, coherent and above all quite well produced." Hip-Hop Infos France gave the album a score of 15 out of 20, commenting that Cyborg "brings a breath of fresh air to French rap, which has been going round in circles for too many months."

"Vinyle"
"Vinyle", the eighth track from the album featuring Nekfeu's fellow 1995 member Alpha Wann, was described by Raplume as the "craziest sound of the album, in terms of flow."

Raplume gave the album a rave review, stating: "After the huge success and the quality of Feu, Nek's first album, he had to set the bar very high for himself and that is clearly what he did with Cyborg." A reviewer from Culturovore, known simply as "Vincent", also liked the album, saying: "Since [the release of Feu] it has to be said, Nekfeu wasn't for me an honest rapper whose full potential I had yet to determine […] I decided to let myself try [listening to Cyborg] and 60 minutes later, my image of Ken Samaras' work changed a lot." They also commented that "the instrumentals fall in quality on the last three songs but voilà, we definitely have the French rap album of the year."

Rémi Tschanz of Aficia commented that Nekfeu "balances his technique, his multi-syllabic creativity, his figures of speech. We are far from the atmosphere of his first album." VraiRapFrançais heaped further praise on the album, saying: "Technically, it is still as impressive [as Feu], even more so because the context of the lyrics make the alliterations even more beautiful. Lyrically, Nekfeu proves that he is one of the best lyricists at the moment and that is set to last." L'info tout court remarked that the album "stands out for its lack of melodies (except for the Clara Luciani feature on the melancholy "Avant tu riais"), and its cold and metallic atmosphere."

=== Commercial performance ===
In its first week, Cyborg was only made available online, selling 18,000 copies via digital download as well as a further 24,000 copies via streaming, coming to a total of 42,000 copies sold in the first week.

Two weeks after release, Cyborg was certified platinum with 106,000 copies sold, including 38,000 physical sales, 22,000 digital sales and 44,000 streams. The album remained top of the iTunes Top Albums chart in France for three consecutive weeks after release.

== Track listing ==
No.	Title	Producer(s)	Length
1.	"Humanoïde"	Diabi; KLM; Loubensky	6:26
2.	"Mauvaise graine"	Hugz Hefner	4:00
3.	"Squa"	Hugz Hefner	4:02
4.	"Réalité augmentée"	Hugz Hefner; Diabi	4:10
5.	"Avant tu riais" (featuring Clara Luciani)	Loubensky	5:06
6.	"Esquimaux" (featuring Népal)	Diabi	3:24
7.	"O.D" (featuring Murkage Dave)	Hologram Lo'; Diabi; Loubensky	4:02
8.	"Vinyle" (featuring Alpha Wann)	Hologram Lo'	4:52
9.	"Saturne" (featuring Sneazzy and S.Pri Noir)	Hugz Hefner	6:03
10.	"Galatée"	Loubensky	3:54
11.	"Le regard des gens" (featuring Némir, 2zer, Mekra and Doum's)	En'Zoo	3:30
12.	"Programmé"	Hugz Hefner	3:39
13.	"Besoin de sens" (featuring Framal and Jazzy Bazz)	Hugz Hefner	3:50
14.	"Nekketsu" (featuring Crystal Kay)	Hologram Lo'; VM the Don; Loubensky	3:32
Total length:			60:30

== Charts ==
=== Weekly charts ===
Chart (2016)	Peak position
Belgian Albums (Ultratop Wallonia)	3
French Albums (SNEP)	4
Swiss Albums (Schweizer Hitparade)	10

=== Year-end charts ===
Chart (2016)	Position
Belgian Albums (Ultratop Wallonia)	76
French Albums (SNEP)	28
Chart (2017)	Position
Belgian Albums (Ultratop Wallonia)	57
French Albums (SNEP)	20
Chart (2019)	Position
Belgian Albums (Ultratop Wallonia)	110
Chart (2020)	Position
Belgian Albums (Ultratop Wallonia)	94
Chart (2021)	Position
Belgian Albums (Ultratop Wallonia)	69

== Certifications ==
Region	Certification	Certified units/sales
France (SNEP)	Diamond	500,000^{‡}
^{‡} Sales+streaming figures based on certification alone.

== Release history ==
Country	Date	Format	Label
France	December 2, 2016	Digital download; streaming	Seine Zoo; Polydor
France	December 9, 2016	CD	Seine Zoo; Polydor
