= Fauve (collective) =

French arts collective of music and videography

FAUVE ≠

Background information
- Origin: Paris, France
- Genres: Spoken word
- Years active: 2010–2015
- Labels: FAUVE CORP
- Members: Quentin Postel; Pierre Cabanettes; Simon Martellozo; Stephane Muraire; Nicolas Dardillac
- Website: fauvecorp.com

Fauve collective, sometimes stylized as FAUVE, is a French arts collective of music and videography established in 2010 in Paris. The band also uses the not equal to sign ≠. The act depends mostly on story telling through acting, through spoken word and musical accompaniment. The collective has its own record label called FAUVE CORP.

FAUVE presents itself as an open collective, containing at times more than twenty members (musicians, but also actors, theatre technicians, visual artists). On stage, the collective is represented by five musicians (vocals, guitar, bass, drums and keyboards) and a video artist. During their media appearances, they aim to remain anonymous and of mysterious origins. The name of the band is inspired by Les Nuits fauves (English title Savage Nights), a 1992 French drama film directed and written by Cyril Collard.

The collective became known through its online postings and found almost immediate success. On 20 May 2013, the band released its debut EP BLIZZARD containing the best of their productions thus far. It made the French Top 20 in its first week of release and two of the tracks appeared in the French Singles Chart. During the Bourges Spring Festival, it won the iNOUïS award as the discovery act of the festival called Découvertes du Printemps.

The collective's first album is called VIEUX FRÈRES - Partie 1. The album was released in two parts: VIEUX FRÈRES - Partie 1 was released on 2 February 2014 reaching number 2 in the SNEP French charts. The second part VIEUX FRÈRES - Partie 2 was released on 16 February 2015.

== Discography ==
=== Studio albums ===
Year	Album	Peak positions				Track listings
Year	Album	FRA	BEL (Fl)	BEL (Wa)	SWI	Track listings
2014	VIEUX FRÈRES – Partie 1: Date of release: 3 February 2014; Record label: FAUVE CORP; Formats: CD, Digital downloads	2	96	4	11	1. "Voyous" (feat. Georgio) (6:16); 2. "Requin-tigre" (4:27); 3. "Jeunesse Talking Blues" (3:01); 4. "Rag #3" (1:35); 5. "Infirmière" (4:42); 6. "De ceux" (3:29); 7. "Rag #4" (1:31); 8. "Tunnel" (4:08); 9. "Vieux frères" (4:07); 10. "Lettre à Zoë" (3:54); 11. "Loterie" (3:41)
2014	VIEUX FRÈRES – Partie 2: Date of release: 3 February 2014; Record label: FAUVE CORP; Formats: CD, Digital downloads	1	87	4	5	1. "Juillet (1998)" (5:10); 2. "Paraffine" (4:20); 3. "Rag #5" (1:32); 4. 'Tallulah' (3:42); 5. "Bermudes" (2:30); 6. "Azulejos" (2:55); 7. "Sous les arcades" (4:32); 8. "T.R.W." (3:25); 9. "Rag #6" (2:05); 10. "Révérence" (3:47); 11. "Les hautes lumières" (5:09)

=== Live albums ===
Year	Album	Peak positions				Notes
Year	Album	FRA	BEL (Fl)	BEL (Wa)	SWI	Notes
2016	150.900: Date of release: 1 April 2016; Record label: Fauve Corp; Formats: CD, digital download	5		11	22	

=== EPs ===
Year	Album	Peak positions	Track listing
Year	Album	FR	Track listing
2013	BLIZZARD: Date of release: 20 May 2013; Record label: FAUVE CORP; Formats: CD, Digital downloads, vinyl LP	13	1. "Blizzard" (4:52); 2. "Cock Music Smart music / Rag #1" (5:00); 3. "Nuits fauves" (4:31); 4. "Haut les cœurs / Rag #2" (5:37); 5. "Kané" (3:59); 6. "Rub a Dub" (5:51)

=== Singles ===
Year	Single	Peak positions		Album
Year	Single	FR	BEL (Wa)	Album
2013	"BLIZZARD"	75	–	Blizzard EP
2013	"NUITS FAUVES"	131	–	Blizzard EP
2013	"SAINTE ANNE"	136	–	Non-album release
2013	"VOYOU"	30	–	Non-album release
2013	"DE CEUX"	43	4* (Ultratip)	Vieux frères – Partie 1
2014	"INFIRMIÈRE"	45	–	Vieux frères – Partie 1
2014	"LETTRE À ZOÉ"	81	–	Vieux frères – Partie 1
2014	"LOTERIE"	111	–	Vieux frères – Partie 1
2014	"VIEUX FRÈRES"	134	–	Vieux frères – Partie 1
2014	"VOYOU" (feat. Georgio)	138	–	Vieux frères – Partie 1
2014	"JEUNESSE TALKING BLUES"	182	–	Vieux frères – Partie 1
2014	"BERMUDES"	117	–	
2015	"LES HAUTES LUMIÈRES"	43	26* (Ultratip)	Vieux frères – Partie 2

*Did not appear in the official Belgian Ultratop 50 charts, but rather in the bubbling under Ultratip charts.
