= Blizzard (EP) =

EP by Fauve
- Released: 20 May 2013
- Length: 29:43
- Label: Fauve Corp

Fauve chronology
Blizzard (2013)	Vieux frères - Partie 1 (2014)

Singles from Blizzard
- 1. "Blizzard" Released: May 2013; 2. "Nuits fauves" Released: May 2013

Blizzard is the first EP of the French collective Fauve on their own Fauve Corp label.

It was released on May 20, 2013. The songs were known since 2011 on the web. Besides the CD and digital downloads, Vinyl LP was also released. The vinyl included a coupon to allow free digital downloads for purchasers of the vinyl version.

== Track listing ==
No.	Title	Length
1.	"Blizzard"	4:48
2.	"Cock music smart music / Rag #1"	5:00
3.	"Nuits fauves"	4:32
4.	"Haut les cœurs / Rag #2"	5:37
5.	"Kané"	3:58
6.	"Rub a dub"	5:48
Total length:		29:43

== Charts ==
Chart (2013)	Peak position
French Albums Chart	13
