= Vieux frères =

Vieux frères is the debut album of the French collective Fauve. The title of the album was announced online on 17 November 2013. The same announcement revealed that it would be in two parts, Partie 1 scheduled in February 2014, and Partie 2 scheduled in winter of 2014, without mentioning a specific date.

== Vieux frères - Partie 1 ==
Vieux frères - Partie 1

Studio album by Fauve
- Released: 3 February 2014
- Recorded: 2013–2014
- Label: Warner Music France

Fauve chronology
Blizzard (2013)	Vieux frères - Partie 1 (2014)	Vieux frères - Partie 2 (2014)

Singles from Le droit de rêver
- 1. "De ceux" Released: 16 December 2013

The album was released in two parts. The first called Partie 1 was released on 3 February 2014 on Warner Music label. "De ceux" was pre-released as a single in preparation for the album.

With the release of the album six different tracks from the album appeared simultaneously on the SNEP French Singles Chart the highest ranking being the track "Infirmière". The album itself entered the official French Albums Chart at number 2.

=== Track listing ===
1. "Voyous" (featuring Georgio) (6:16)
2. "Requin-tigre" (4:27)
3. "Jeunesse Talking Blues" (3:01)
4. "Rag #3" (1:35)
5. "Infirmière" (4:42)
6. "De ceux" (3:29)
7. "Rag #4" (1:31)
8. "Tunnel" (4:08)
9. "Vieux frères" (4:07)
10. "Lettre à Zoé" (3:54)
11. "Loterie" (3:41)

== Charts ==
Chart (2014)	Peak position
Belgian Albums Chart (Flanders)	96
Belgian Albums Chart (Wallonia)	4
French Albums Chart	2

== Vieux frères - Partie 2 ==
The follow-up album, a completion of the Vieux frères series, was released on 16 February 2015.
