= L'entourage =

French hip hop rap collective

L'entourage (French pronunciation: [lɑ̃tuʁaʒ]) is a French hip hop crew composed of several bands and solo artists founded in 2008. The members emanated from the battle-rap contest Rap Contenders as well as support of many artists and bands. The collective's first studio album Jeunes Entrepreneurs was launched by Believe Recordings on 26 May 2014 with a premier concert at the Paris Olympia on 14 June 2014 with all members of the collective on stage.

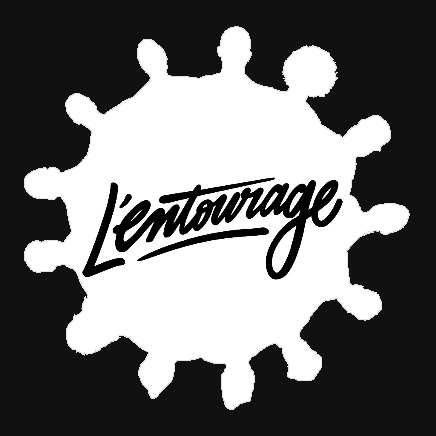
Logo

== Members ==
Nekfeu is a main contributor. The collective also includes three of his S-Crew: 2zer, Framal, and Mekra.

Nekfeu, Alpha Wann, and Fonky Flav' are also from the earlier rap formation 1995.

Members in alphabetical order are:

- 2zer Washington
- Abou
- Alpha Wann
- Candy Cotton
- Deen Burbigo
- Doums
- Eff Gee
- Fonky Flav'
- Framal
- Jazzy Bazz
- Mekra
- Nekfeu

== Discography ==
=== Albums ===
Year	Album	Peak positions			Certification
Year	Album	FR	BEL (Wa)	SWI	Certification
2014	Jeunes entrepreneurs	10	17	37	

=== Singles ===
Year	Title	Peak positions		Album
Year	Title	FR	BEL (Wa)	Album
2014	"Jim Morrison"	58	–	Jeunes entrepreneurs
2014	"Toujours là"	44	–	Jeunes entrepreneurs
2014	"Bal masqué"	19	49	Jeunes entrepreneurs
2014	"Mourir demain"	20	–	Jeunes entrepreneurs
2014	"Fous la merde"	22	–	Jeunes entrepreneurs
2014	"Soixante-Quinze"	161	–	Jeunes entrepreneurs

== Videography ==
List of music videos:

- 2014: "Les Rois"
- 2014: "Soixante Quinze"
- 2014: "Bal Masqué"
- 2014: "Toujours là"
- 2014: "Jim Morrison"
- 2014: "Caramello"
- 2012: "Les choses se passent" with Casse Croute
- 2012: "Introduction"
- 2011: "Plus à gagner qu'à perdre"
