= Sneazzy =

French rapper

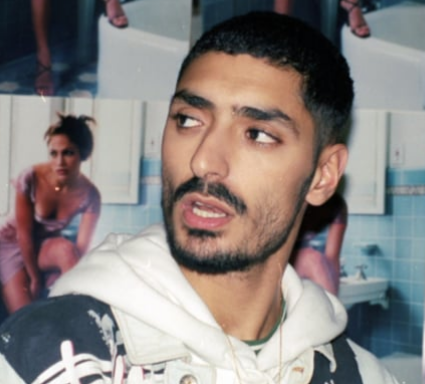

Background information
- Also known as: Sneazzy West, Sneaz'
- Born: Mohamed Amine Khemisa; 12 January 1992 (age 34); Paris, France
- Genres: French rap, hip hop
- Occupations: Rapper, songwriter, actor
- Years active: 2008-present
- Formerly of: 1995

Mohamed Amine Khemisa (born 12 January 1992) better known as Sneazzy or Sneazzy West or Sneaz, is a French rapper and actor. Besides his own solo output, he is also a member of the French rap collective 1995.

== Life and career ==
Sneazzy was born in a mixed Moroccan and Tunisian family and grew up with his mother in the 15th arrondissement of Paris. In 2008, he co-founded the hip hop collective 1995 alongside Nekfeu and a number of other artists like Alpha Wann, Darryl Zeuja, Areno Jaz, Fonky Flav' and DJ Lo'. Their collective EP La Sourcein 2011 was followed by the EP La suite in 2012 and the album Paris Sud Minute beginning of 2013.

In 2015, Sneazzy released his debut solo album Super with limited success. In 2016 and 2017, he released Dieu bénisse Supersound in three separate volumes as a trilogy. In 2019, he took an acting role in the film Source (English title Wipe Out) released on 27 July 2019. His second album Nouvo Mode was released on 6 March 2020.

The track "Zéro Détail" featuring Nekfeu created huge controversy with lyrics targeting journalist and presenter of CNews Pascal Praud of being an amateur and for discrediting Islam. Praud, in return, accused Sneazzy of uttering menacing lyrics compromising his safety. Sneazzy claimed he had been misunderstood and absolved Nekfeu of any personal responsibility in the affair saying he himself was the "sole author" explaining that expressions like "balle dans le cervelet [la tête]" and "canon dans la bouche" were metaphors and commonly used and were not meant literally. Praud eventually withdrew his plans of suing Sneazzy over the affair.

== Discography ==
=== Albums ===
Title	Year	Peak positions		
Title	Year	FRA	BEL (Wa)	SWI
Super	2015	74	88	–
Dieu bénisse Supersound (Saison 1, 2 & 3) *Vol. 1 (2016) *Vol. 2 (2017) *Vol. 3 (2017)	2016-2017	26	–	–
Nouvo mode	2020	8	10	28

=== Singles ===
Title	Year	Peak positions	Album
Title	Year	FRA	Album
"Voilà" (feat. Nekfeu)	2014	145	

==== Featured in ====
Title	Year	Peak positions			Album
Title	Year	FRA	BEL (Wa)	SWI	Album
"Mon âme" (Nekfeu feat. Sneazzy)	2015	152	—	—	Nekfeu album Feu
"Saturne" (Nekfeu feat. Sneazzy & S.Pri Noir)	2016	25	Tip	—	Nekfeu album Cyborg

=== Other songs ===
Title	Year	Peak positions		Album
Title	Year	FRA	BEL (Wa)	Album
"Sérieux" (feat. Hankock)	2017	156	Tip	Dieu bénisse Supersound Saison 3
"Skurt Cobain" (feat. Nekfeu)	2017	165	44* (Ultratip)	Dieu bénisse Supersound Saison 1
"Évite la" (feat. S.Pri Noir)	2017	185	—	Dieu bénisse Supersound Saison 2
"Jenny From Da Blocka" (feat. Laylow & Jok'Air)	2017	197	—	Dieu bénisse Supersound Saison 3
"J'encaisse"	2019	194	—	
"Zéro détail" (feat. Nekfeu)	2020	42	41* (Ultratip)	Nouvo mode
"Étincelles" (feat. Alpha Wann, Nekfeu & S.Pri Noir)	2020	48	—	Nouvo mode
"T'as capté" (with S.Pri Noir & Alpha Wann)	2020	79	—	Nouvo mode
"Cigarettes" (feat. Arma Jackson)	2020	140	—	Nouvo mode
"Sang froid" (feat. Laylow)	2020	153	—	Nouvo mode
"À quoi tu joues"	2020	154	—	Nouvo mode
"Non Stop"	2020	175	—	Nouvo mode
"Règles"	2020	191	—	Nouvo mode

*Did not appear in the official Belgian Ultratop 50 charts, but rather in the bubbling under Ultratip charts.

== Filmography ==
- 2019: La Source (English title Wipe Out) as Samir Benhima
