= 1995 (band) =

French rap group

- Origin: France known as P.O.S
- Genres: French hip hop
- Years active: 2008-2019
- Members: Alpha Wann; Areno Jaz; Fonky Flav'; Nekfeu; Sneazzy West; Hologram Lo'

1995 was a French rap band founded in 2008 in the southern part of Paris as P.O.S. The name was changed to "1995" in 2010 in reference to the year 1995, considered a "golden year" for French rap. The six-member group is composed of 5 rappers and one producer all coming from the 14th and 15th arrondissements in Paris. 1995 are influenced by the spontaneous and positive vibes from the 1990 French rap.

The band name is pronounced in various formats like "Mille neuf cent quatre vingt quinze" or "Dix neuf quatre vingt quinze" or "un, neuf, neuf, cinq" ([ɛ̃ nœf nœf sɛ̃k]) or "un, double neuf, cinq" ([ɛ̃ dublə nœf sɛ̃k]). Despite offers for signing, the band has remained strongly independent through their own "Undoubleneufcinq" label (meaning onedoubleninefive).

== Members ==
The 6 members of the group are:

- Alpha Wann - aka Phaal or Philly Phaal
- Areno Jaz - aka Jupiter Jaz or Darryl Zeuja
- Fonky Flav' - aka Fonk'
- Nekfeu - aka Nek le Fennek or Nekflamme
- Sneazzy West - aka Sneaz' or Sneazzy
- DJ Lo' - aka Lo' or Hologramme Lo'

The first five are rappers, whereas Lo' is a beatmaker and DJ. The rap group was established by Alpha Wann and Areno Jaz. Later on, it was expanded to include Nekfeu and Sneazzy (who went to the same school as Alpha Wann). Fonky Flav' was met through some Myspace postings and became the producer of 1995's materials.

== Career ==
After starting at rap competitions and open mic events in their various Paris and provincial venues, they realized the impact of the rap scene. They followed the establishment of various other rap collectives, founders Alpha Wann and Areno Jaz decided to expand P.O.S (literally Porteur Officiel de Sac-à-dos / or Petite Organisation Scred) into a bigger formation paying tribute to the 1990s.

The band released "Dans ta réssoi" that garnered quickly more than 5 million views on YouTube followed by "Hi Haters". They became a constant presence in different battles including the famous Rap Contenders.

Their first EP containing 8 self-produced titles entitled La Source was released in France in June 2011. It reached #23 in the SNEP French official charts., and #7 in downloads in its first week of release. Their Facebook attracted 130,000 followers. and their YouTube accumulated 12 million views.

Various members also release their own materials and projects like En Sous Marin EP by members Nekfeu and Alpha Wann, a net-EP by Sneazzy, or a mini-LP solo by Areno Jaz titled Alias Darryl Zeuja.

In March 2012, their second EP was released under the title La suite distributed by Universal Music Group in agreement with the band's label. The band embarked on a tour and series of appearances in music festivals to promote the album.

Paris Sud Minute the first album of the collective was released beginning of 2013. It was chosen as "Best Urban Music Album" during the Victoires de la musique the same year.

== Discography ==
=== Albums ===
Year	Album	Charts			Label	Certification
Year	Album	FR	BEL (Wa)	SWI	Label	Certification
2013	Paris Sud Minute	4	21	32	Undoubleneufcinq label / Polydor	

=== EPs ===
Year	Album	Charts	Label	Certification
Year	Album	FR	Label	Certification
2011	La Source (EP)	23	Undoubleneufcinq label	
2012	La Suite (EP)	8	Undoubleneufcinq label / Polydor	

=== Singles ===
Year	Single	Charts	Certification	Album
Year	Single	FR	Certification	Album
2012	"La Suite"	42		La Suite
2012	"Réel"	63		Paris Sud Minute

== Solo projects of members ==
(name of member in parentheses) (for details and positions, see discographies of Alpha Wann, Nekfeu (including S-Crew), Sneazzy

- 2009 : Lowfficieux (Beatmaker : Hologram Lo', rappers : 1995 and other)
- 2010 : Même Signature (Nekfeu with his other band, S-Crew)
- 2011 : 5 Majeur (Nekfeu with his other band, 5 Majeur)
- 2011 : 925 (Beatmaker : DJ Lo' and other, with 3 songs which contains rap )
- 2011 : #Nothing (Sneazzy)
- 2011 : En sous-marin (Alpha Wann & Nekfeu)
- 2012 : Êtes vous prêts? (Sneazzy)
- 2012 : Alias Darryl Zeuja (Areno Jaz)
- 2012 : Métamorphose (Nekfeu with his other band, S-Crew)
- 2012 : Le singe fume sa cigarette (Beatmaker : Hologram Lo', rappers : Lomepal et Caballero)
- 2013 : Soleil d'hiver (Beatmaker : Hologram Lo', rapper : Georgio)
- 2013 : Seine Zoo (Nekfeu with his other band, S-Crew)
- 2013 : Variations (Nekfeu with his other band, 5 Majeur)
- 2013 : Rue Du Bon Son (Areno Jaz with his other band, X.L.R)
- 2014 : Alph Lauren (Alpha Wann)
- 2014 : Jeunes entrepreneurs (Nekfeu, Alpha Wann, Fonky Flav' with L'Entourage)
- 2014 : Deeplodocus (Hologram Lo')
- 2014 : InnerCity (Hologram Lo' et Darryl Zeuja)
- 2015 : Super (Sneazzy West)
- 2015 : Feu (Nekfeu)
- 2015 : Lexus (Hologram Lo')
- 2016 : Alph Lauren II (Alpha Wann & Hologram Lo')
- 2016 : Destin Liés (Nekfeu with S-Crew)
- 2016 : Jeep (Hologram Lo')
- 2016 : Dieu Benisse Supersound (Sneazzy)
- 2016 : Cyborg (Nekfeu)
- 2017 : Dieu Benisse Supersound II (Sneazzy)
- 2017 : Dieu Bénisse Supersound III (Sneazzy)
- 2018 : Alph Lauren III (Alpha Wann)
- 2018 : UMLA (Alpha Wann)
- 2019 : Les Étoiles vagabondes (Nekfeu)
- 2020 : Nouvo Mode (Sneazzy)
- 2020 : Chilladelphia (Darryl Zeuja)
- 2020 : Don Dada Mixtape Vol 1 (Alpha Wann)

== Songs / Videos ==
- 2011 : "Flava In Ya Ear" (dir: Le Garage)
- 2011 : "La Source" (dir: Le Garage)
- 2011 : "La Flemme" (dir: Le Garage)
- 2012 : "The Motto Remix" (dir: Le Garage)
- 2012 : "La Suite" (dir: Le Garage / Syrine Boulanouar)
- 2012 : "Renégats" (dir: Le Garage / Syrine Boulanouar & Rodolphe Lauga)
- 2012 : "Bienvenüe" (dir: Kourtrajmé)
- 2012 : "Flingue Dessus" (dir: Le Garage / Syrine Boulanouar)
- 2012 : "Freestyle PSM" (dir: Le Garage)
- 2012 : "Réel" (dir: Le Garage / Syrine Boulanouar)
- 2012 : "Pétasse Blanche" (dir: Le Garage / Syrine Boulanouar)
- 2012 : "Bla Bla Bla" (dir: Nicolas Davenel)

Nekfeu

- 2014 : "Time B.O.M.B" - Nekfeu (dir: GVRCH et Clifto Cream)
- 2014 : "Egérie" (dir: Dawid Krepski)
