= Laylow =

French rapper

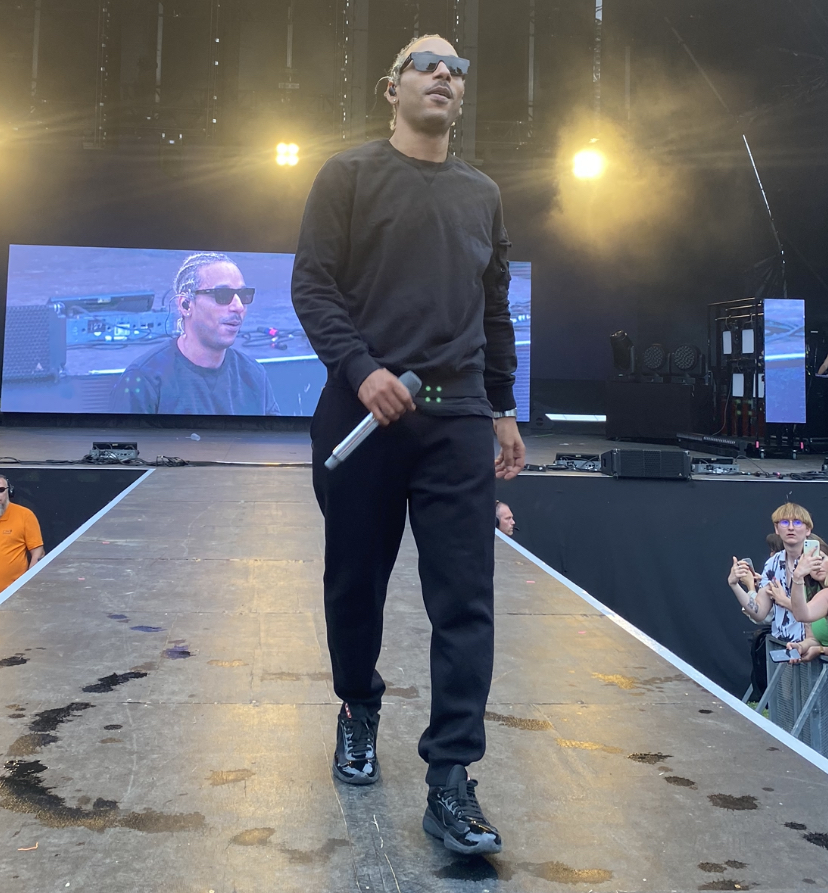

Background information
- Born: Jeremy Larroux; Toulouse, France
- Genres: French rap, hip hop
- Occupation: Rapper
- Instrument: Vocals
- Years active: 2012–present
- Label: Digital Mundo
- Website: https://laylow.netlify.app/

Jeremy Larroux (born 1993), better known as Laylow is a French rapper from Toulouse. In 2018, Laylow released the EPs .RAW and RAW-Z. His first album, Trinity, featured collaborations with Lomepal, S.Pri Noir, Jok'Air, Wit., Alpha Wann, and was released on 28 February 2020. The album reached number 3 in the French Albums Charts. The follow-up L'étrange histoire de Mr. Anderson peaked at number 1 with collaborations with Damso, Nekfeu, Hamza, Alpha Wann and Slowthai.

== Early life ==
Laylow was born in 1993 in Toulouse, a city in southern France, where he lived until the age of nine, when he left for Tunisia with his father briefly, before joining his mother in Abidjan, Ivory Coast. He then spent some time in the city of Mirande in the Gers at a boarding school, where he met his future manager, and ended up settling in Toulouse. It was at this age that he began to rap after his older brother introduced him to the art. He was influenced by American artists such as Ja Rule or G-Unit, the bling-bling side of rappers impressing him from his childhood, with French rap coming to him a little later.

== Career ==
=== Beginnings ===
He began his career with Toulouse artist Sir'Klo to form the duo Laylow x Sir'Klo. After a first song called "Attrape nous si tu peux" featuring Wit. Published in 2011, they released their first joint project two years later, "Roulette Russe", as a presentation. Influenced by American rap and especially West Coast rap, this project allowed them to be known little by little in French rap. Signed with Barclay, the Toulouse residents released the same year a new free project. It was also in 2011 that he made a stint in the Rap Contenders Sud.

Laylow joined Montpellier's Wit. for a joint EP, Digital Night, released in November 2015. An 8 track EP accompanied with eight clips with TBMA, the beginning of long collaborations, both with the rapper and the production team.

=== First solo EPs ===
After several titles and clips published in 2016, he launched his solo career more concretely with Mercy, an EP of ten titles released in December 2016 where he invited various artists featuring including Wit again on two tracks, and armed himself again with the TBMA team, becoming the manufacturing brand of his so-called "futuristic" clips.

His second project released on 5 July 2017, Digitalova, again contained ten titles and new artist collaborations, with Jok'Air and his sidekick Sir'Klo always accompanied by TBMA for the visuals.

His third solo project of ten titles, .RAW was released on 19 June 2018 and hosted a unique featuring with Wit. The fourth project soon followed on 7 December of the same year: a ten-track EP entitled .RAW -Z and announced only three days before its release, which proved most successful, sincere of his projects followed with a tour in 2019.

=== Debut album: Trinity ===
After releasing four EPs, Laylow moved away from the format and issued his first studio album, Trinity, on 28 February 2020. Three tracks—Megatron, TrinityVille, and Poizon—were released in advance of the album. Comprising 22 tracks, the album presents a narrative centered on the artist’s interaction with an emotional stimulation software named Trinity. The release received positive critical reception and achieved commercial success, contributing to Laylow’s increased recognition within French rap.

== Discography ==
=== Albums ===
Title	Year	Peak positions			
Title	Year	FRA	BEL (Fl)	BEL (Wa)	SWI
Trinity	2020	4	172	7	19
L'étrange histoire de Mr. Anderson	2021	1	20	1	4

=== Maxis ===
Title	Year	Peak positions
Title	Year	FRA
Digital Night	2015	—
Mercy	2016	—
Digitalova	2017	—
.RAW	2018	—
.RAW-Z	2019	175

=== Singles ===
Title	Year	Peak positions		Album / Maxi
Title	Year	FRA	BEL (Wa)	Album / Maxi
"Digitalova"	2017	—	—	Digitalova
"Gogo" (feat. Jok'air)	2017	—	—	Digitalova
"Brrr" (with Vladimir Cauchemar & Asdek featuring Rim'K)	2021	77	—	Non-album singles
"Une histoire étrange"	2024	—	20	Non-album singles

=== Featured in ===
Title	Year	Peak positions	Album
Title	Year	FRA	Album
"Money Call" (Shayfeen feat. Laylow & MADD)	2018	—	Album Shayfeen; Safar
"Sang froid" (Sneazzy feat. Laylow)	2020	154	Sneazzy album Nouvo Mode
"Démons" (Joanna feat. Laylow)	2020	—	Joanna album Sérotonine
"Ciel pleure" (Dinos feat. Laylow)	2020	24	Dinos album Stamina,

=== Other songs ===
Title	Year	Peak positions			Album
Title	Year	FRA	BEL (Wa)	SWI	Album
"Burning Man" (feat. Lomepal)	2020	62			Trinity
"Dehors dans la night"	2020	74			Trinity
"Plug" (feat. Jok'Air)	2020	85			Trinity
"Vamonos" (feat. Alpha Wann)	2020	109			Trinity
"Trinityville"	2020	126			Trinity
"Megatron"	2020	131			Trinity
"Poizon"	2020	133			Trinity
"Hillz" (feat. S.Pri Noir)	2020	138			Trinity
"Longue vie..."	2020	144			Trinity
"Piranha Baby"	2020	155			Trinity
"Logiciel triste"	2020	162			Trinity
"Nakré"	2020	181			Trinity
"Million Flowerz"	2020	187			Trinity
"...de bâtard" (feat. Wit.)	2020	189			Trinity
"Akanizer"	2020	194			Trinity
"Batards" (feat. Koba LaD)	2021	99			Koba LaD album Cartel vol. 1
"R9R-Line" (feat. Damso)	2021	4	25	55	L'étrange histoire de Mr. Anderson
"Special" (feat. Nekfeu & Foushée)	2021	7	45	91	L'étrange histoire de Mr. Anderson
"Iverson"	2021	14			L'étrange histoire de Mr. Anderson
"Window Shopper Part. 2" (feat. Hamza)	2021	17			L'étrange histoire de Mr. Anderson
"Un rêve étrange"	2021	25			L'étrange histoire de Mr. Anderson
"Stuntmen" (feat. Alpha Wann & Wit.)	2021	26			L'étrange histoire de Mr. Anderson
"Voir le monde brûler"	2021	27			L'étrange histoire de Mr. Anderson
"Une histoire étrange"	2021	31			L'étrange histoire de Mr. Anderson
"Lost Forest"	2021	35			L'étrange histoire de Mr. Anderson
"Ça va pas etre possible..."	2021	43			L'étrange histoire de Mr. Anderson
"Que la pluie"	2021	46			L'étrange histoire de Mr. Anderson
"Help"	2021	50			L'étrange histoire de Mr. Anderson
"Bonsoir mon vieil ami"	2021	51			L'étrange histoire de Mr. Anderson
"Tu veux déjà me dire aurevoir?"	2021	52			L'étrange histoire de Mr. Anderson
"Fallen Angels" (feat. Slowthai)	2021	55			L'étrange histoire de Mr. Anderson
"NightShop BlaBla"	2021	66			L'étrange histoire de Mr. Anderson
"+ de pluie..."	2021	79			L'étrange histoire de Mr. Anderson
"C'est eux contre nous"	2021	86			L'étrange histoire de Mr. Anderson
"Tu comprends maintenant"	2021	90			L'étrange histoire de Mr. Anderson
