= Still Fresh =

French rapper

Still Fresh (born in 1994) is a French rapper from the 20th arrondissement of Paris. He has been signed with Sony Music since 2010.

== Biography ==
He started early, encouraged by music managers and producers Xavier and Moblack. He was featured in a number of tracks on the compilation hip hop album À la Fuck You including a collaboration with Mister You in "Sur le terrain" featuring Bilel, DI & Still Fresh. He released his first album in 2011 titled Mes rêves followed by Marche ou rêve in 2013. In 2012, he released a mixtape N.E in collaboration with S.Pri Noir.

== Discography ==
Year	Album	Peak positions	Details
Year	Album	FRA	Details
2011	Mes rêves	–	Track listing: 1. "C'est que le début" (3:14); 2. J' perds le contrôle" (3:36); 3. "Vie de voyou" (feat. Mister You) (4:08); 4. "Ma génération" (3:36); 5. "Mes rêves" (3:38); 6. "J'fais ce que je veux" (feat. Spri Noir) (3:38); 7. "Passe la fresh" (3:40); 8. "Quand je serai grand" (feat. Brasco) (3:40); 9. "Je sais d'où je viens" (feat. Taïro) (3:33); 10. "C'est pas la même" (feat. La Fouine) (3:55); 11. "Massacre" (3:51); 12. "Mise en garde" (feat. Dosseh) (3:07); 13. "Le poids des maux" (3:10)
2013	Marche ou rêve	107	Track listing: 1. "C'est ça ou pas" (3:33); 2. "Observe" (3:58); 3. "D'homme à femmes (pardonne-moi)" (3:27); 4. "Vendeur de rêve" (feat. Nej) (4:03); 5. "Freshbook" (3:25); 6. "Apache" (3:50); 7. "J'regarde le ciel" (3:56); 8. "Amour et haine" (3:30); 9. "Esclave du système" (feat. S.Pri Noir & Fababy) (4:11); 10. "Ne me juge pas" (4:14); 11. "En attendant l'été" (3:39); 12. "Je pense" (3:35); 13. "S'tirer vers le haut" (3:50); 14. "Biff dans l'crâne" (feat. Quincy) (2:57); 15. "Aigle du désert" (3:33)
2017	Coeur noir	33	
2019	Trapop 2	120	

== Mixtapes ==
- Fresh Tape (Mixtape)
- N.E (crediting S.Pri Noir & Still Fresh) (2012)
