= Jok'Air =

- Born: Melvin Félix Aka; 23 September 1991 (age 34); Paris, France
- Genres: Hip hop, Emo rap, Dirty rap, Contemporary R&B
- Occupation: Rapper
- Years active: 2006–present
- Labels: Play Two, Low Wood, La Dictature

Jok'Air, pseudonym of Melvin Félix Aka (born 23 September 1991 in Paris), is a French rapper of Ivorian descent. He was part of the hip hop collective MZ until 2016, before starting a solo career.

== Biography ==
Melvin Félix Aka was born in the 19th arrondissement of Paris and grew up in the 13th arrondissement, precisely in Chevaleret.

== Career ==
=== MZ ===
He became passionate about hip hop at the age of 15, so much so that his brother Davidson decided to pay him for hours in a recording studio, together with his friends Hache-P, Dehmo and Loka. The four friends founded the MZ group, i.e. Mafia Zeutrei.

Between 2006 and 2016, MZ released two studio albums and six mixtapes, before disbanding the due to an argument Jok'Air and Davidson had with Hache-P and Dehmo. Feeling betrayed, Jok'Air decided to start a solo career.

=== Solo career ===
He began his solo career with his title C'est la guerre, which preceded his EP Big Daddy Jok, released on February 24, 2017. He also released two mixtapes during the same year he, titled Je suis Big Daddy and Jok'Pololo. At the beginning of 2018, he signed a deal with Play Two label, with which he released his first album, Jok'Rambo, on May 25 of the same year.

His second album, Jok'Travolta, was made available on March 29, 2019, and was subsequently certified gold. Jok'Chirak, his third album, was released on March 20, 2020.

During this period, he regularly participated in Radio Sexe, a web radio broadcast on Twitch on the topic of sexuality. He also launched, on the BET channel, his own reality show, called Jok'Air in LA.

He released his fourth album, VI République, on December 11, 2020. The album cover depicted activist Assa Traoré under the French tricolour, in the role of President of the Republic. On November 19, 2021, it was the turn of his mixtape New Jok City, which also included gospel sounds.

His fifth album, Melvin de Paris, was released on May 12, 2023, and featured Laylow, Dann, Linema, Damso, So La Lune, Kady and Soprano as guest artists.

== Discography ==
=== Studio albums ===
- Jok'Rambo (2018)
- Jok'Travolta (2019)
- Jok'Chirak (2020)
- VI République (2020)
- Melvin de Paris (2023)

=== Mixtapes ===
- Je suis Big Daddy (2017)
- Jok'Pololo (2017)
- New Jok City (2021)

=== EPs ===
- Big Daddy Jok (2017)

=== As a member of MZ ===
- Affaire de famille (2015)
- La dictature (2016)
