= Alpha Wann =

French rapper

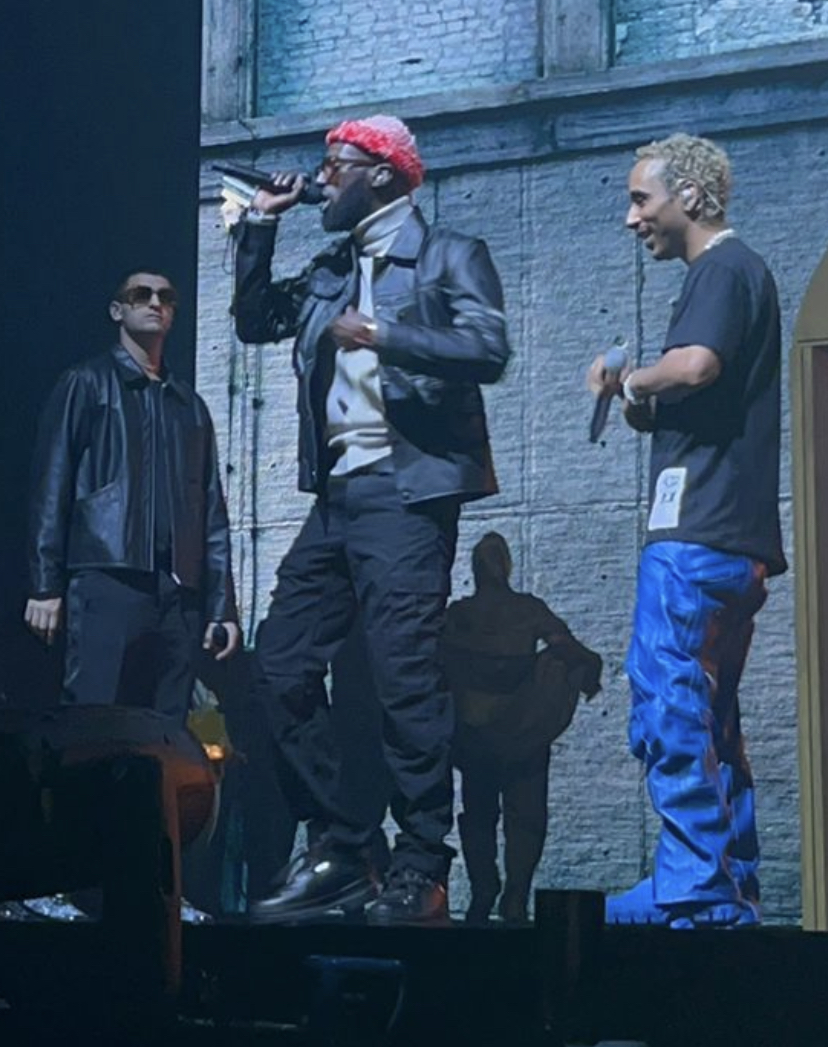
- Alpha Wann at Laylow’s bercy, 2022

Background information
- Born: 2 July 1989 (age 36)
- Origin: France
- Genres: Rap

Alpha Oumar Wann (French pronunciation: [alfa omaʁ wan]; Alpha Wann, also known as Phaal or Philly Phaal; born 2 July 1989) is a French rapper and songwriter. He is the main member and co-founder of the group 1995 with Nekfeu, Areno Jaz, Fonky Flav', Sneazzy, and DJ Lo' (aka Hologramme Lo'). He was also a member of the band L'entourage, and is the founder of Don Dada Records. Alpha Wann is signed to Universal Music.

A founding member of 1995, Alpha Wann also launched a solo career releasing three consecutive EPs as a trilogy known as Alph Lauren. On 21 September 2018, he released his debut album, Une main lave l'autre, also known as UMLA, which was certified gold a year later. At the end of 2020, he released a successful mixtape.

== Discography ==
=== Albums ===
Title	Year	Peak positions		
Title	Year	FRA	BEL (Wa)	SWI
Une main lave l'autre (UMLA)	2018	10	17	33

=== EPs ===
Title	Year	Peak positions	
Title	Year	FRA	BEL (Wa)
Alph Lauren	2014	48	60
Alph Lauren 2	2016	20	21
Alph Lauren 3	2018	56	57

=== Mixtapes ===
Title	Year	Peak positions		
Title	Year	FRA	BEL (Wa)	SWI
Don Dada Mixtape Vol. 1	2021	6	11	29

=== Singles ===
Title	Year	Peak positions			Album / EP / Mixtape
Title	Year	FRA	BEL (Wa)	SWI	Album / EP / Mixtape
"Ça va ensemble"	2016	189	—	—	Une main lave l'autre
"Pistolet rose 2"	2019	93	Tip	—	Pistolet rose 2 [PPP EP]

=== Songs featured in ===
Title	Year	Peak positions			Album
Title	Year	FRA	BEL (Wa)	SWI	Album
"Vinyle" (Nekfeu feat. Alpha Wann)	2016	145	—	—	Nekfeu album Cyborg
"Compte les hommes" (Nekfeu feat. Alpha Wann)	2019	17	—	—	Nekfeu album Les étoiles vagabondes
"Vamotos" (Laylow feat. Alpha Wann)	2020	109	—	—	Laylow album Trinity
"Étincelles" (Sneazzy feat. Alpha Wann, Nekfeu & S.Pri Noir)	2020	48	—	—	Sneazzy album NOUVO MODE
"T'as capté" (S.Pri Noir, Alpha Wann & Sneazzy)	2020	79	—	—	S.Pri album État d'esprit
"Rap catéchisme" (Freeze Corleone feat. Alpha Wann)	2020	6	—	48	Freeze Corleone album LMF
"Stuntmen" (Laylow feat. Alpha Wann & Wit.)	2021	26	—	—	Laylow album L'étrange histoire de Mr. Anderson

=== Other charted songs ===
Title	Year	Peak positions			Album / EP / Mixtape
Title	Year	FRA	BEL (Wa)	SWI	Album / EP / Mixtape
"À deux pas" (feat. Nekfeu)	2016	172	—	—	Alph Lauren 2
"Le piège"	2018	188	—	—	Une main lave l'autre
"Aaa" (feat. Nekfeu)	2020	18	—	—	Don Dada Mixtape Vol. 1
"NY à fond" (with Freeze Corleone)	2020	25	12* (Ultratip)	—	Don Dada Mixtape Vol. 1
"Philly Flingo"	2020	30	—	—	Don Dada Mixtape Vol. 1
"Soldat tue soldat" (feat. Infinit' & Kaaris)	2020	38	—	—	Don Dada Mixtape Vol. 1
"Mitsubishi"	2020	59	—	—	Don Dada Mixtape Vol. 1
"3095 pt2" (feat. 3010 & Nekfeu)	2020	69	—	—	Don Dada Mixtape Vol. 1
"Trapchat" (feat. Veust)	2020	70	—	—	Don Dada Mixtape Vol. 1
"APDL"	2020	75	Tip	—	Don Dada Mixtape Vol. 1
"Pistons vs Pacers" (feat. Kalash Criminel)	2020	89	—	—	Don Dada Mixtape Vol. 1
"Fahrenheit 451"	2020	104	—	—	Don Dada Mixtape Vol. 1
"Carrelage italien"	2020	105	—	—	Don Dada Mixtape Vol. 1
"Dirty Dancing" (feat. Dean Burbigo & Infinit')	2020	107	—	—	Don Dada Mixtape Vol. 1
"La lune attire la mer"	2020	131	—	—	Don Dada Mixtape Vol. 1

*Did not appear in the official Belgian Ultratop 50 charts, but rather in the bubbling under Ultratip charts.
