= S.Pri Noir =

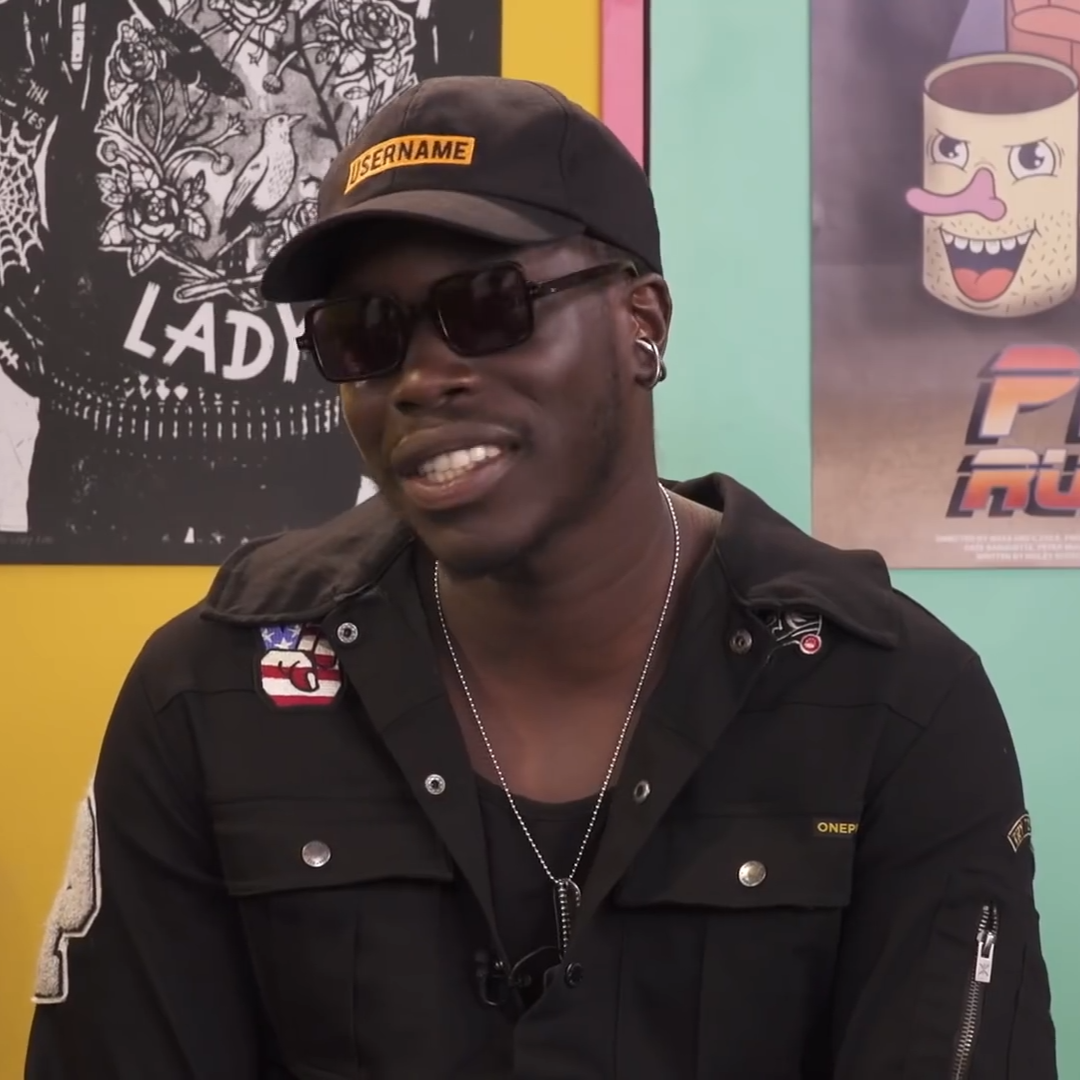

Background information
- Also known as: S.Pri Noir
- Born: Malick Mendosa
- Genres: French hip hop
- Occupations: Rapper
- Instruments: Voice
- Labels: Nouvelle École, Believe, Sony

Malick Mendosa, better known by his stage name S.Pri Noir, is a French rapper of Senegalese origin.

== Biography ==
Born to a mother from Senegal, a nursery school teacher, and a father from Guinea-Bissau, he grew up in the 18th arrondissement of Paris until the age of 12, then spent his teenage years in the Fougères district, in the 20th arrondissement of Paris.

During his teenage years, S.Pri Noir played American football in the Flash de la Courneuve club, twice winning the French championship with his team. Mendosa chose S.Pri Noir to use as a screen name on MSN Messenger, and later decided to adopt it for the stage.

He studied for a BTS Technico-commercial, a French sales and marketing qualification, while writing his first lyrics. He set up his own label, Nouvelle École, and signed to Sony together with three other rappers: Still Fresh, Moblack and Cerebro.

Between 2008 and 2009, he joined the collective L'Institut du 75 (which later became "L'Institut") made up of numerous rappers including Jarod, Dr Beriz (Toxmo at the time), Abou Debeing and 1solent. He also performed on the first two volumes of À la Fuck you.

In 2013, he collaborated on the track Marche with 12 other rappers such as: Nekfeu, Disiz, Soprano, Sadek, Kool Shen, Akhenaton and many other artists.

In 2015, S.Pri Noir took part in the second annual AbbéRoad, a charity concert organised by the Abbé Pierre Foundation.

He joined S&S Tour with Sneazzy from March 2018, following a concert at La Cigale in October 2017.

He released his debut album Masque Blanc on 11 May 2018, which sold 6,000 copies in its first week and reached number 18 on the Top Albums chart in France, featuring collaborations with artists Nekfeu, Nemir and Still Fresh. The album went gold in France in March 2019.

His second solo album, État d'esprit, was released on 17 April 2020 and featured contributions from Leto, Alpha Wann, Sneazzy, 4Keus, Alonzo, Lefa, Laylow, Lyna Mahyem and Dadju.

== Discography ==
=== Albums ===
Year	Title	Chart			Certification
Year	Title	FRA	BEL (WA)	SWI	Certification
2018	Masque blanc	3	39	—	SNEP: Gold
2024	État d'esprit	2	9	25	SNEP: Gold
2024	La cour des miracles	4	45	47	

=== Mixtapes and EPs ===
Year	Title	Chart position
Year	Title	FRA
2012	En attendant État d'esprit	—
2014	0.0.S : Licence to Kill	107
2015	Le monde ne suffit pas	91

=== Collaborative album ===
- 2012 : N.E (with Still Fresh)

=== Singles ===
- 2018 : Skywalker
- 2018 : Highlander
- 2018 : Baby Gyal
- 2018 : Middle FInger
- 2018 : Fusée Arianne
- 2018 : Finesse (feat. Haute)
- 2018 : Juste pour voir (feat. Nekfeu)
- 2018 : Narco Poète
- 2018 : Chico
- 2018 : Papillon
- 2019 : Mon Crew (feat. Nemir)
- 2020 : Dystopia
- 2020 : 4 litres 2
- 2020 : T'as capté (feat. Alpha Wann et Sneazzy)
- 2020 : Maman dort (feat. Alonzo)
- 2020 : Rio Paris - Vol 447
- 2020 : 911 (feat. Dadju)
- 2021 : AR (feat. Gazo)
- 2021 : En vrai (feat. Da Uzi)
- 2021 : 7 vies (feat. RK)
- 2021 : Juicy (feat. Sean)
- 2021 : Hacienda
- 2021 : Assermenté (feat. Mister You)
- 2021 : Savage (feat. Goya)
- 2021 : Sarah Connor
- 2021 : Si tu savais (feat. Tayc)
- 2021 : Bombay (feat. Still Fresh)

=== Collaborations ===
- 2015 : Abou Debeing feat. S.Pri Noir et Dadju - Bye Bye
- 2015 : Nekfeu feat. S.Pri Noir - Ma dope (from the album Feu)
- 2016 : The Shin Sekaï feat. Franglish, S.Pri Noir et Abou Debeing - Pablo Picasso (from the album Les Chroniques du Wati-Boss, Volume 3)
- 2016 : The Shin Sekaï feat. Black M, S.Pri Noir et Abou Debeing - Bounce (from the album Indéfini)
- 2016 : Hayce Lemsi et Volts Face feat. Abou Tall et S.Pri Noir - Célébrer (from the album À des années lumières)
- 2016 : Nekfeu feat. Sneazzy et S.Pri Noir - Saturne (from the album Cyborg)
- 2017 : Sianna feat. S.Pri Noir - Charbonner (from the album Diamant noir)
- 2017 : Rim'K feat. S.Pri Noir - No Future (from the album Fantôme)
- 2017 : Lefa feat. S.Pri Noir - Rouler (from the album Visionnaire)
- 2017 : Still Fresh feat. S.Pri Noir - Demande-moi (from the album Cœur noir)
- 2017 : Dadju feat. S.Pri Noir - Jenny (from the album Gentleman 2.0)
- 2017 : Black M feat. S.Pri Noir - N.C.M (on the reissue of the album Éternel Insatisfait)
- 2017 : Awa Imani feat. S.Pri Noir - Aime-moi
- 2018 : Lefa feat. Dadju et S.Pri Noir - J'me téléporte (from the album 3 du mat)
- 2018 : Dadju feat. S.Pri Noir - Jenny (on the reissue of the album Gentleman 2.0)
- 2018 : 4Keus feat S.Pri Noir - Toute la night (from the album À cœur ouvert)
- 2019 : Abou Debeing feat. Dadju, Franglish et S.Pri Noir - Calme (from the album Street Love)
- 2019 : Abou Tall feat. S.Pri Noir - Eau de Cologne (from the album Ghetto Chic)
- 2020 : Sneazzy feat. S.Pri Noir - Mon père c'est ma mère (from the album Nouvo Mode)
- 2020 : Sneazzy feat. Alpha Wann, Nekfeu et S.Pri Noir - Étincelles (from the album Nouvo Mode)
- 2020 : Nemir feat S.Pri Noir - Rock N' Roll (from the album Nemir)
- 2020 : Lyna Mahyem feat S.Pri Noir - Code Pin 778 (from the album Femme forte)
- 2020 : D.Ace feat S.Pri Noir - Charmant (from the album Vox cordis)
- 2021 : Mister You feat. S.Pri Noir - La fragrance (from the album HLM 2)
- 2021 : Lujipeka feat. S.Pri Noir - Putain d'époque
- 2021 : Ya Levis x Leto x S.Pri Noir - YSL (sur l'EP LCLM : Prélude)

== Nominations ==
- 2020 BET Award for Best International Act
