= Freeze Corleone =

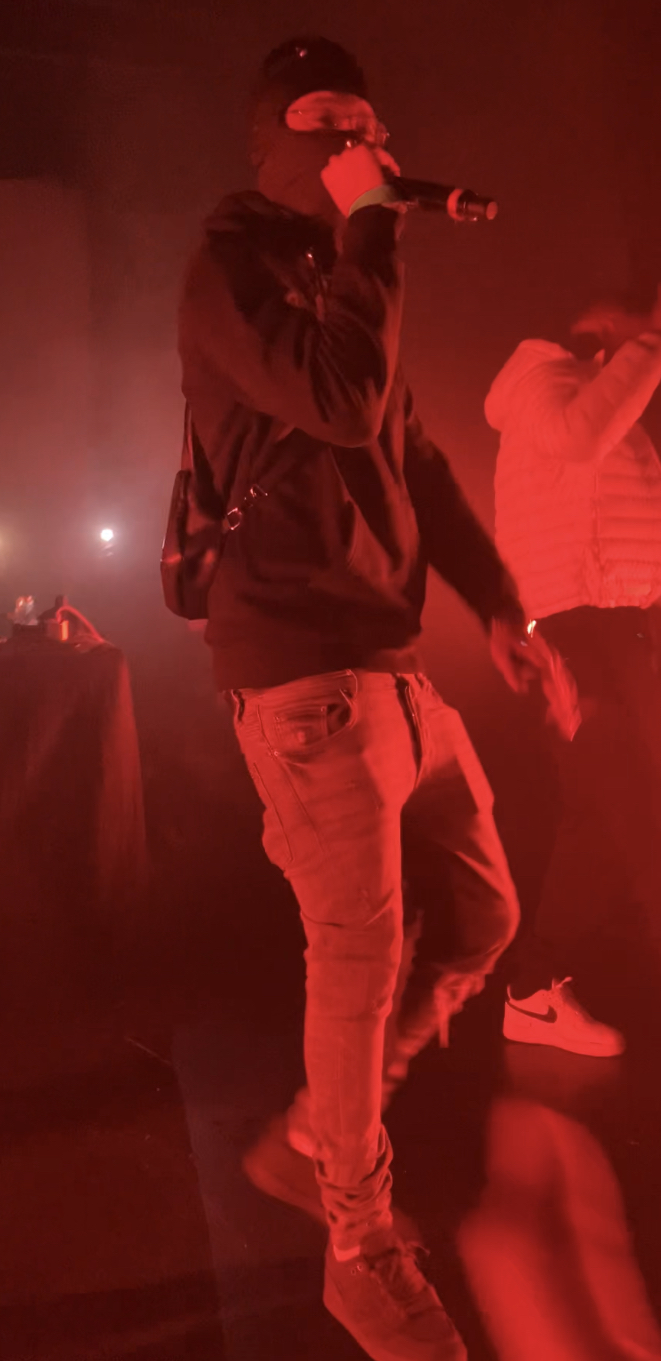

Background information
- Born: Issa Lorenzo Diakhaté; 6 June 1992 (age 33); Les Lilas, Seine-Saint-Denis, France
- Genres: French hip hop; drill; trap; cloud rap
- Instrument: Rapping
- Years active: 2009-present
- Labels: M.M.S Records (independent)
- Member of: 667 (group), CFR

Issa Lorenzo Diakhaté (born 6 June 1992 in Les Lilas, Seine-Saint-Denis), better known as Freeze Corleone, is a French rapper, singer-songwriter and record producer. He is also the founder of the collective 667, and CFR (with Norsacce and Osirus Jack). He lives in Dakar, Senegal.

== Early life ==
Corleone was born in Les Lilas in Seine-Saint-Denis to a Senegalese father and an Italian mother. In an interview with Les Inrocks, he claims to have spent his early years in Pantin, before attending high school in Dakar, Senegal.

== Career ==
=== LMF: Debut studio album and controversies ===
On 11 September 2020 Freeze Corleone released his first studio album, LMF (La Menace Fantôme). The album reached #2 on the French charts and was certified gold three weeks after its release.

Following the release of this album, the International League Against Racism and Anti-Semitism pointed to numerous remarks deemed antisemitic in his lyrics and to Corleone's "obsession with Jews". On 17 September 2020, following a report by Frédéric Potier, the inter-ministerial delegate for the fight against racism, antisemitism and anti-LGBT hatred, the Paris public prosecutor's office announced that it was opening "an investigation into various video clips and songs by Freeze Corleone on charges of provocation to racial hatred and racist insult". On 18 September 2020 Universal Music announced it was ending its collaboration with the rapper.

In May 2021, LMF was certified platinum. In March 2022, it was certified double platinum.

A concert scheduled for December 2022 in Montreal was cancelled in November 2022, "presumably following pressure from the B'nai Brith organization", which deemed his lyrics antisemitic, according to the Canadian newspaper La Presse. Corleone reacted to the cancellation by posting three dragon emojis on Twitter. According to L'Abcdr du son, this was "a cryptic way of blaming Jews for the cancellation, via a roundabout reference to the manga One Piece, where 'celestial dragons' are superior beings".

In February 2023, The New York Times published an investigation into the secret signing of Freeze Corleone under BMG Rights Management despite the controversy caused by the release of LMF. The agreement involved Freeze Corleone being signed to the label without any explicit mention of it on his records. BMG intended to release Freeze Corleone's album Riyad Sadio before ultimately deciding to backpedal on the contract and cancel it.

On 28 February 2023, a concert scheduled to take place in Rennes was banned by municipal decree, citing his lyrics as "veritable provocations and incitements to hatred and even violence". Corleone responded by sharing a speech by Louis Farrakhan, in which the leader of the Nation of Islam denied being antisemitic. On 11 March 2023, Freeze Corleone obtained the suspension of the municipal decree. Municipal authorities announced that they would lodge an appeal with the Conseil d'Etat.

== Discography ==
=== Albums ===
Year	Title	Certifications
2020	LMF	SNEP: Platinum
2023	ADC	SNEP: Platinum

=== Mixtapes ===
Year	Title
2011	À la recherche de la daillance
2012	Vieilles Merdes
2016	Vieilles Merdes ll
2016	F.D.T
2017	THC
2018	Projet Blue Beam

=== In group ===
Year	Title	With
2014	667 Radio Noël Special Edition	667 (Ligue des Ombres)
2015	F.F.O	CFR
2016	67ème Degré	667 (Ligue des Ombres)
2022	Riyad Sadio	Ashe 22

=== Notable collaborations ===
Year	Title	With	Album/Mixtape/EP	Certifications
2018	"Sacrifice de Masse"	Osirus Jack	Projet Blue Beam	
2018	"KKK"	VEERUS	Marché Noir	
2018	"Cyanure"	Django		
2019	"Crystal Lake"	Luv Resval		
2019	"Purification"	Alkpote		
2020	"Braquage à l'africaine pt.5"	Sazamyzy, Kalash Criminel		
2020	"Drill FR 4"	Gazo		
2020	"Anarchie"	Zesau, Stavo	Carré dans l'angle	
2020	"Scellé pt.2"	Ashe 22	LMF	SNEP : Gold
2020	"Rap catéchisme"	Alpha Wann	LMF	SNEP : Gold
2020	"PDM"	Alpha 5.20, Shone	LMF	
2020	"7 sur 7"	Koba LaD	Détail	SNEP : Platinium
2020	"IRM"	Kaaris	2.7.0	
2020	"TPM"	Guy2Bezbar		
2020	"ny à fond"	Alpha Wann	don dada mixtape vol.1	SNEP : Gold
2021	"Les Professeurs"	Vladimir Cauchemar, Seth Gueko, Phazz	BRRR	
2021	"Mannschaft"	SCH	JVLIVS 2	
2021	"Polémique"	Central Cee		
2021	"Pépé Anglais"	Zuukou Mayzie	Segunda Temporada	
2021	"27"	DA Uzi	Vrai 2 Vrai	
2021	"Grammy"	Mac Tyer	Noir 3	
2022	"Apocalypse"	Kaaris, Kalash Criminel	SVR	SNEP : Gold
2022	"Eurovision"	Central Cee, Rondodasosa, Baby Gang, A2anti, Morad, Beny Jr, Ashe 22	23	
2022	"90'"	Doums	Pull à capuche et billets mauves	
2022	"Balotelli"	Prince Waly	Moussa	
2022	"Maybach Phantom"	Kpri	Kpri Tape, Vol.3	
2026	"DICTIONNAIRES"	Ninho	M.I.L.S 4	
