= Lomepal =

French rapper and singer (born 1991)

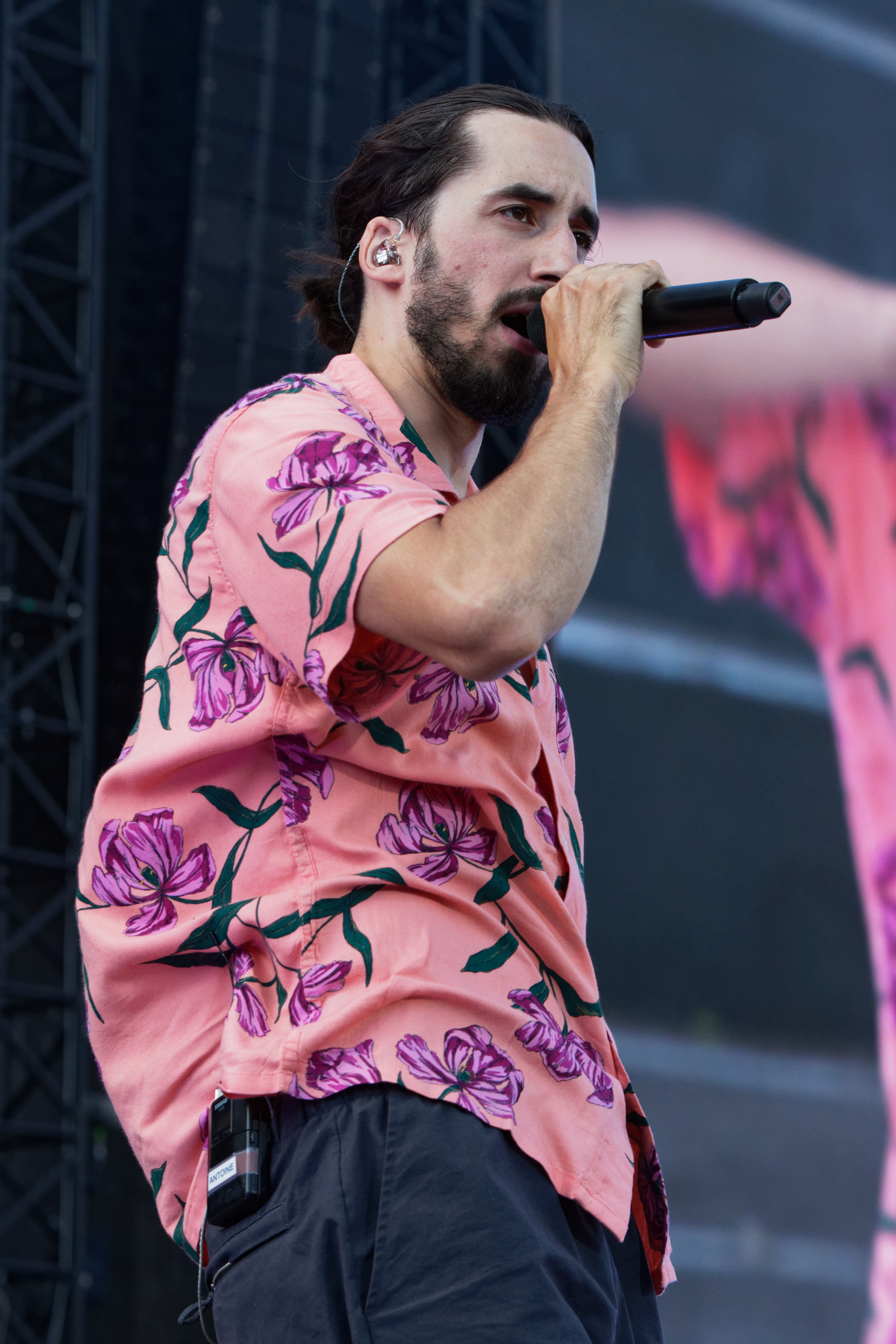
- Lomepal in 2019

Background information
- Born: Antoine Valentinelli; 4 December 1991 (age 34); Givenchy en Gohelle, France
- Genres: French hip hop, alternative hip hop
- Occupations: Rapper, singer
- Instrument: Vocals
- Years active: 2011–2019, 2022-present
- Labels: PIAS, Pineale Prod, Grand Musique Management
- Website: lomepal.com

Antoine Valentinelli (born 4 December 1991 in Paris), better known by his stage name Lomepal, is a French rapper and singer from the 13th arrondissement of Paris. He has released five EPs, and three studio albums: Flip, released in June 2017, Jeannine, released in December 2018, both certified double platinum by the SNEP, and Mauvais Ordre, released in September 2022.

== Career ==
In 2017, Lomepal performed more than a hundred live shows and received over 100 million views on his YouTube channel.

On 8 December 2018, Lomepal released his second studio album Jeannine, titled after his grandmother who suffered from schizophrenia, from which he drew inspiration, exploring themes that use the illness as a power rather than a burden.

On 25 October 2019, Lomepal released the album Amina. The album is essentially a deluxe version of his album Jeannine including all of its songs, with some having been remixed, replaced with a live/acoustic version or somehow modified.

Lomepal's album Mauvais ordre was released in September 2022.

His stage name comes from the fact that his friends always thought he was sick because of his pale complexion, hence Lomepal (for "the pale man"). His first stage name was Jo Pump. He is friends with the Belgian rapper Roméo Elvis, with whom he collaborated on the song "1000°C" for Lomepal's album Jeannine.

== Sexual assault allegations ==
In July 2023, an Instagram post alleged that Lomepal was among several other performers well known in the industry for making repeated and unwanted sexual advances. Also in 2023, an investigation was opened into a complaint of rape filed against him in 2020 over an incident from 2017. The Cabaret Vert festival canceled the concert at which Lomepal was scheduled to perform on August 17, 2023 due to the complaint.

Mediapart revealed on May 21, 2024 that a third woman filed a complaint of rape against Lomepal also over an incident from 2017.

The Paris prosecutor's office closed the preliminary investigation against Lomepal, ruling on January 24, 2025, it did not find sufficient evidence to support the allegations of rape made by three women.

The prosecutor's decision indicated the alleged incidents could not be "clearly established" during the investigations, marking a significant moment for Lomepal, who has consistently denied the accusations. He took to Instagram to state, "I am innocent. I resume my life."

== Discography ==
=== Albums ===
Title	Details	Peak positions			Units	Certifications
Title	Details	FRA	BEL (Wa)	SWI	Units	Certifications
Flip	Released: 30 June 2017; Label: Pineale Prod, Grand Musique Management; Formats: CD, vinyl, digital download, streaming	24	13	58		SNEP: 3× Platinum
Jeannine	Released: 7 December 2018; Label: Pineale Prod, Grand Musique Management; Formats: CD, vinyl, digital download, streaming	1	2	5	FRA: 337,017	SNEP: 3× Platinum; BEA: Gold
3 jours à Motorbass	Released: 19 October 2019; Label: Pineale Prod, Grand Musique Management; Formats: Streaming	18	—	—		
Amina	Released: 25 October 2019; Label: Pineale Prod, Grand Musique Management; Formats: Streaming	3	—	14		SNEP: Diamond
Mauvais ordre	Released: 16 September 2022; Label: Pineale Prod, Grand Musique Management; Formats: Streaming	1	1	2		SNEP: 3× Platinum

=== Extended plays ===
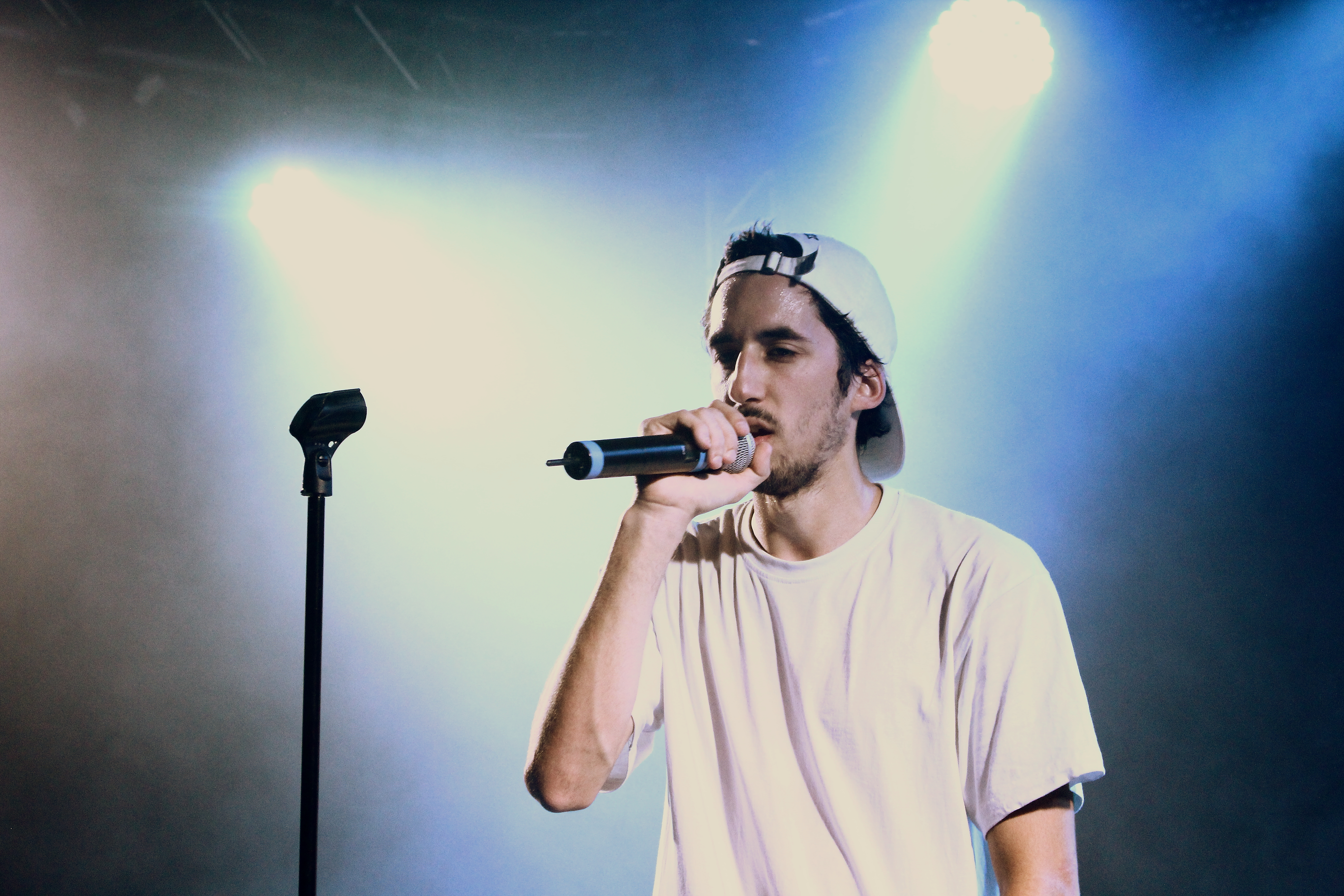
Lomepal performing at L'Astrolabe in 2015

Title	Details	Peak positions
Title	Details	FRA
20 mesures	Released: 2011	—
Cette foutue perle	Released: 2013	64
Seigneur	Released: 2014	72
Majesté	Released: 2015	107
ODSL (with Stwo)	Released: 2016	—

=== Singles ===
Title	Year	Peak positions			Certifications	Album
Title	Year	FRA	BEL (Wa)	SWI	Certifications	Album
"Pommade"	2017	—	—	—		Flip
"Ray Liotta"	2017	—	—	—		Flip
"Yeux disent"	2017	81	43	—	SNEP: Platinum	Flip
"Palpal"	2017	—	—	—		Flip
"Club"	2017	118	—	—	SNEP: Gold	Flip
"Tout lâcher"	2018	174	—	—		Non-album singles
"Deux"	2018	94	—	—		Non-album singles
"1000°C"	2018	3	82	SNEP: Gold	Jeannine	
"Tee"	2022	9	24	—		Mauvais ordre
"Mauvais ordre"	2022	2	19	29		Mauvais ordre

=== Other charted songs ===
Title	Year	Peak positions			Album
Title	Year	FRA	BEL (Wa)	SWI	Album
"Ne me ramène pas"	2018	7	—	—	Jeannine
"Mômes"	2018	8	—	—	Jeannine
"X-Men" (featuring JeanJass)	2018	4	—	—	Jeannine
"Plus de larmes"	2018	12	—	—	Jeannine
"Le vrai moi"	2018	18	—	—	Jeannine
"Skit Roman"	2018	35	—	—	Jeannine
"La vérité" (featuring Orelsan)	2018	5	—	—	Jeannine
"Trop beau"	2018	1	14	—	Jeannine
"Le lendemain de l'orage"	2018	21	—	—	Jeannine
"Skit Mamaz"	2018	45	—	—	Jeannine
"Beau la folie"	2018	16	—	—	Jeannine
"Évidemment"	2018	15	—	—	Jeannine
"Dave Grohl"	2018	24	—	—	Jeannine
"Ma cousin"	2018	28	—	—	Jeannine
"Cinq doigts" (featuring Katerine)	2018	40	—	—	Jeannine
"Dans le livret"	2018	71	—	—	Jeannine
"Flash"	2019	9	—	70	Amina
"Montfermeil" (featuring Caballero and JeanJass)	2019	21	—	81	Amina
"Regarde-moi"	2019	16	—	73	Amina
"200"	2019	68	—	—	Amina
"Yusuf"	2019	60	—	—	Amina
"À peu près"	2022	3	22	35	Mauvais ordre
"Hasarder"	2022	6	26	42	Mauvais ordre
"Etna"	2022	11	—	—	Mauvais ordre
"50°"	2022	12	—	—	Mauvais ordre
"Decrescendo"	2022	13	40	—	Mauvais ordre
"Maladie moderne"	2022	14	—	—	Mauvais ordre
"Le miel et le vinaigre"	2022	18	—	—	Mauvais ordre
"Crystal"	2022	20	—	—	Mauvais ordre
"Prends ce que tu veux chez moi"	2022	21	—	—	Mauvais ordre
"Pour de faux"	2022	26	—	—	Mauvais ordre
"Skit Il"	2022	34	—	—	Mauvais ordre
"Skit Lost Memo"	2022	40	—	—	Mauvais ordre
